= 2024 Super Formula Championship =

Japanese open-wheel motor racing event

The 2024 Japanese Super Formula Championship was the fifty-second season of premier Japanese open-wheel motor racing, and the twelfth under the moniker of Super Formula. It started in March at Suzuka Circuit and ended in November at the same venue, after nine rounds across seven race weekends.

Sho Tsuboi, driving for Vantelin Team TOM’S, won his first Super Formula Drivers' Championship at the final race, ahead of two-time champion Tomoki Nojiri. Docomo Team Dandelion Racing won the Teams' Championship.

This was the final Super Formula season for three-time champion Naoki Yamamoto and one-time champion Yuji Kunimoto. Yamamoto announced his retirement on 5 November prior to the season-ending JAF Suzuka Grand Prix, and Kunimoto announced his after the season ended.

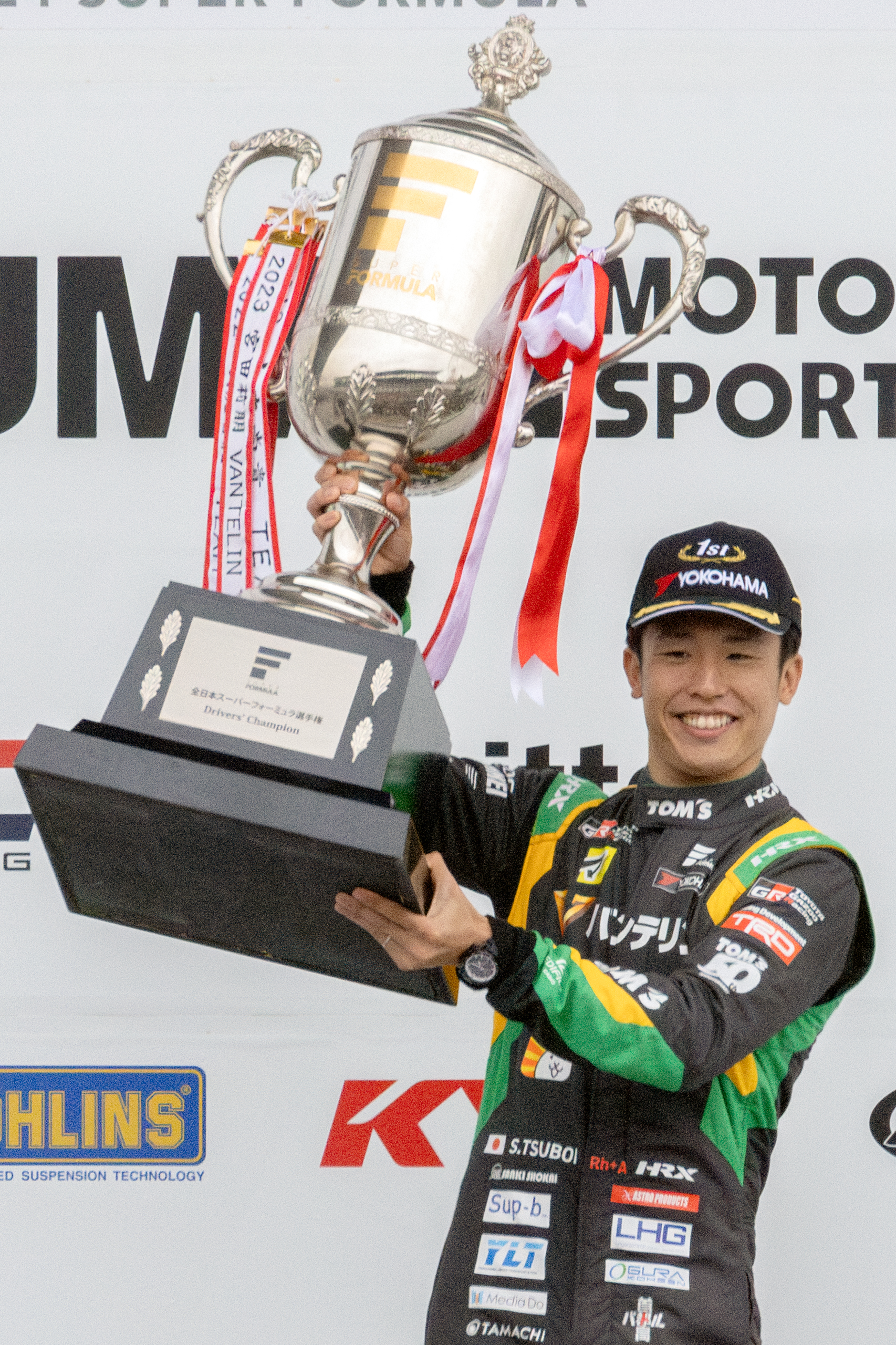
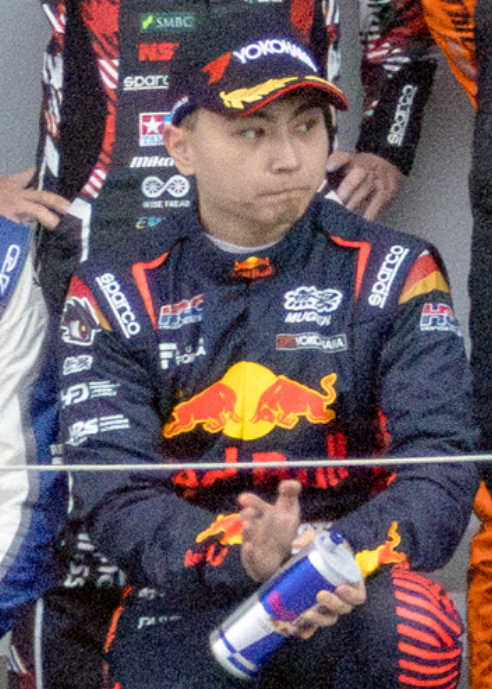
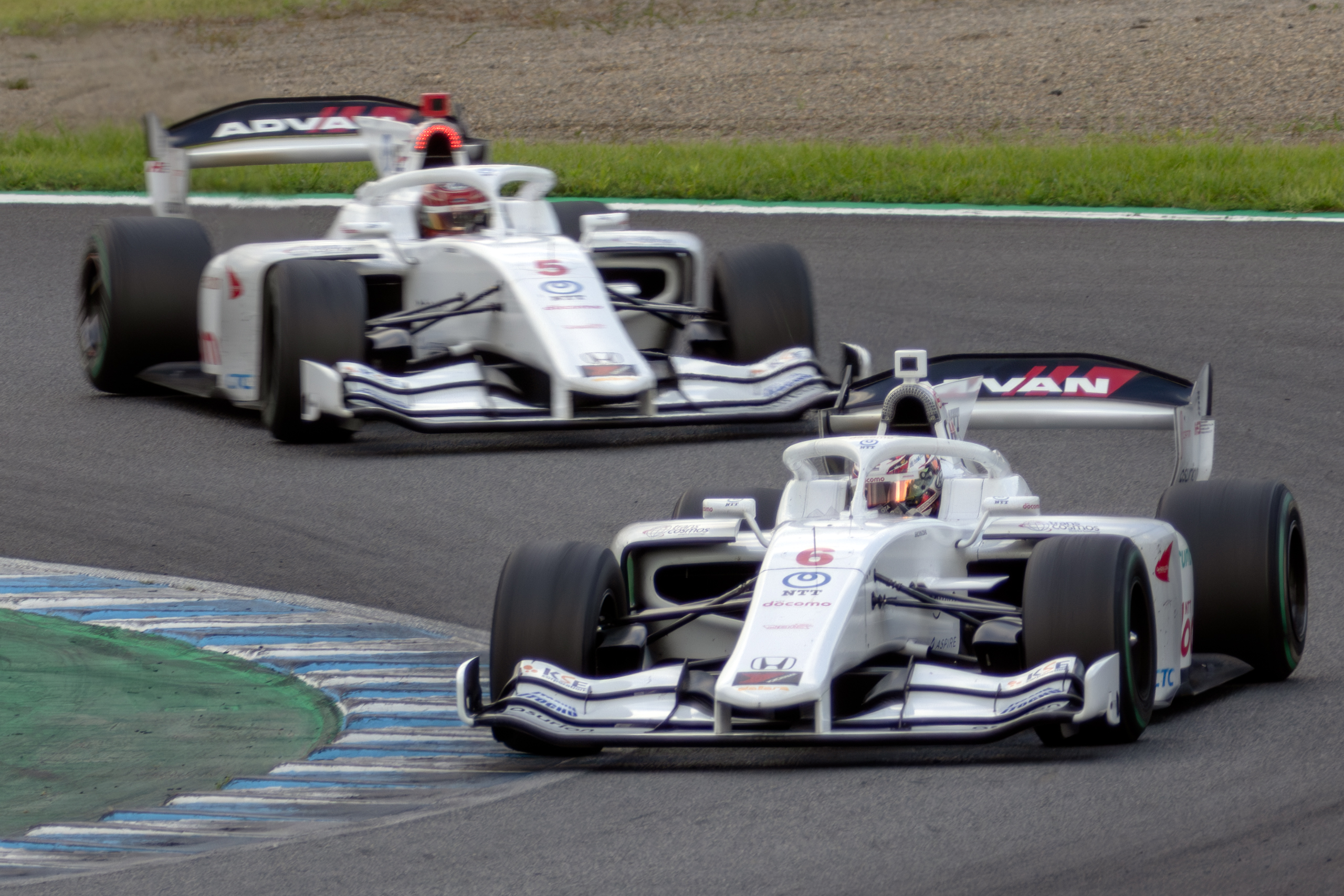
Sho Tsuboi (TOM'S, top) won his first Super Formula Drivers' Championship. Ayumu Iwasa (Team Mugen, middle) was Rookie of the Year, while Dandelion Racing (bottom) won the Teams' Championship.
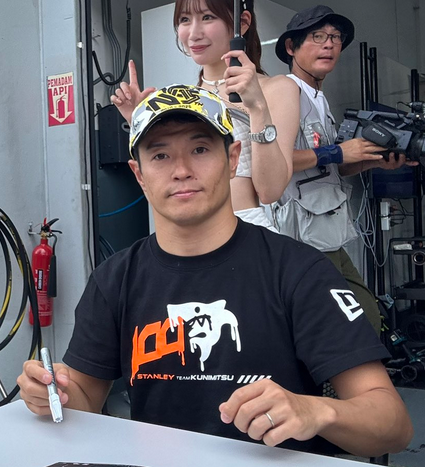
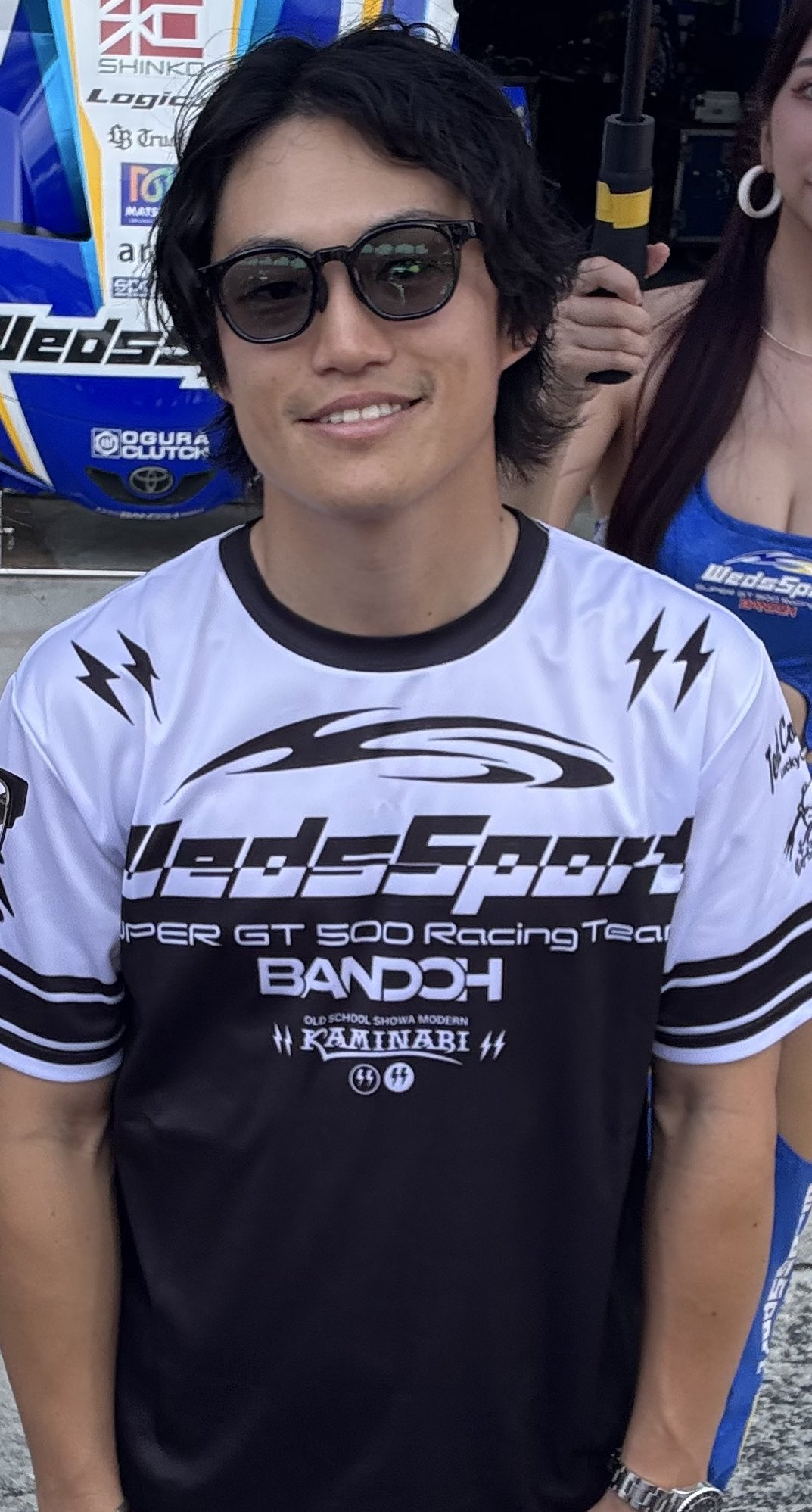
The 2024 Super Formula Championship was the last season for three-time champion Naoki Yamamoto (pictured in 2025), and 2016 champion Yuji Kunimoto (pictured in 2025). Both ended their careers after 15 and 14 seasons, respectively.

== Teams and drivers ==
All teams used identical Dallara-built SF23 chassis with either Honda or Toyota engines. Every Honda-powered car used a Honda HR-417E engine and every Toyota-powered car used a Toyota TRD-01F engine.

Entrant	Engine	No.	Driver name	Rounds
(Japan) Kondo Racing	Toyota	3	(Japan) Kenta Yamashita	All
(Japan) Kondo Racing	Toyota	4	(Japan) Kazuto Kotaka	All
(Japan) Docomo Team Dandelion Racing	Honda	5	(Japan) Tadasuke Makino	All
(Japan) Docomo Team Dandelion Racing	Honda	6	(Japan) Kakunoshin Ohta	All
(Hong Kong) Kids com Team KCMG	Toyota	7	(Japan) Kamui Kobayashi	All
(Hong Kong) Kids com Team KCMG	Toyota	8	(Japan) Nirei Fukuzumi	All
(Japan) ThreeBond Racing	Honda	12	(Japan) Atsushi Miyake	All
(Japan) docomo business ROOKIE	Toyota	14	(Japan) Kazuya Oshima	All
(Japan) Team Mugen	Honda	15	(Japan) Ayumu Iwasa	All
(Japan) Team Mugen	Honda	16	(Japan) Tomoki Nojiri	All
(Japan) Itochu Enex Team Impul	Toyota	19	(France) Théo Pourchaire	1
(Japan) Itochu Enex Team Impul	Toyota	19	(United Kingdom) Ben Barnicoat	2
(Japan) Itochu Enex Team Impul	Toyota	19	(Japan) Hibiki Taira	3–4, 8–9
(Japan) Itochu Enex Team Impul	Toyota	19	(Netherlands) Nyck de Vries	5–7
(Japan) Itochu Enex Team Impul	Toyota	20	(Japan) Yuji Kunimoto	All
(Japan) Vantelin Team TOM’S	Toyota	36	(Japan) Sho Tsuboi	All
(Japan) Vantelin Team TOM’S	Toyota	37	(Japan) Ukyo Sasahara	All
(Japan) Vertex Partners Cerumo・INGING	Toyota	38	(Japan) Sena Sakaguchi	All
(Japan) Vertex Partners Cerumo・INGING	Toyota	39	(Japan) Toshiki Oyu	All
(Japan) San-Ei Gen with B-Max	Honda	50	(Japan) Iori Kimura	All
(Japan) TGM Grand Prix	Honda	53	(Japan) "Juju"	All
(Japan) TGM Grand Prix	Honda	55	(Japan) Nobuharu Matsushita	1–3
(Japan) TGM Grand Prix	Honda	55	(Japan) Hiroki Otsu	4–9
(Japan) PONOS Nakajima Racing	Honda	64	(Japan) Naoki Yamamoto	All
(Japan) PONOS Nakajima Racing	Honda	65	(Japan) Ren Sato	All

=== Team changes ===
- B-Max Racing Team downsized from running two cars in 2023 to a single-car entry in 2024. The team also gained a new title sponsor in food ingredient manufacturer San-Ei Gen, with the team now known as San-Ei Gen with B-Max.
- Cerumo-INGING acquired a new title sponsor in finance advisory firm Vertex Partners, with the team now known as Vertex Partners Cerumo-INGING.
- Nakajima Racing acquired a new title sponsor in video game developer PONOS to replace Tata Consultancy Services (TCS), with the team now known as PONOS Nakajima Racing.

=== Driver changes ===
- Reigning Drivers' Champion Ritomo Miyata left the series and moved to Formula 2 and the European Le Mans Series in preparation to step up to the FIA World Endurance Championship with Toyota Gazoo Racing. Miyata's replacement at TOM'S was Sho Tsuboi, who spent the last five seasons at Cerumo-INGING, and was Miyata's co-driver in their 2023 Super GT GT500 class championship campaign. Ukyo Sasahara, who raced with TOM'S for the last three rounds of the 2023 season, returned on a full-time contract for 2024. Both drivers swapped numbers from the end of last season with Tsuboi driving the No. 36 car and Sasahara the No. 37 car.
- 2023 Championship runner-up Liam Lawson also left the series to focus on his dual reserve driver role at Red Bull Racing and RB Formula One Team in Formula One. He was replaced at Team Mugen by fellow Red Bull Junior Team member Ayumu Iwasa, who returned to Japan to make his series debut.
- Cerumo-INGING signed former Honda and TGM Grand Prix driver Toshiki Oyu to replace Sho Tsuboi. Sena Sakaguchi took over Tsuboi's old number 38, and Oyu was given the number 39.
- Team Impul recruited an all-new lineup of 2023 FIA Formula 2 Champion Théo Pourchaire, who made his series debut as the only non-Japanese driver on the grid, and 2016 Super Formula champion Yuji Kunimoto, who had spent the last four seasons with KCMG. Impul's former drivers left the series, with Ryō Hirakawa electing to focus on his new role as the reserve driver for McLaren in Formula One and Yuhi Sekiguchi joining KCMG as a reserve driver and team coordinator.
- KCMG signed former Honda and ThreeBond Racing driver Nirei Fukuzumi to replace Yuji Kunimoto in the renumbered No. 8 entry, alongside team-mate Kamui Kobayashi.
- B-Max Racing Team recruited reigning Super Formula Lights champion Iori Kimura to drive the team's single No. 50 car. Nobuharu Matsushita left B-Max after four seasons, and Raoul Hyman left after just one season in the No. 51 car.

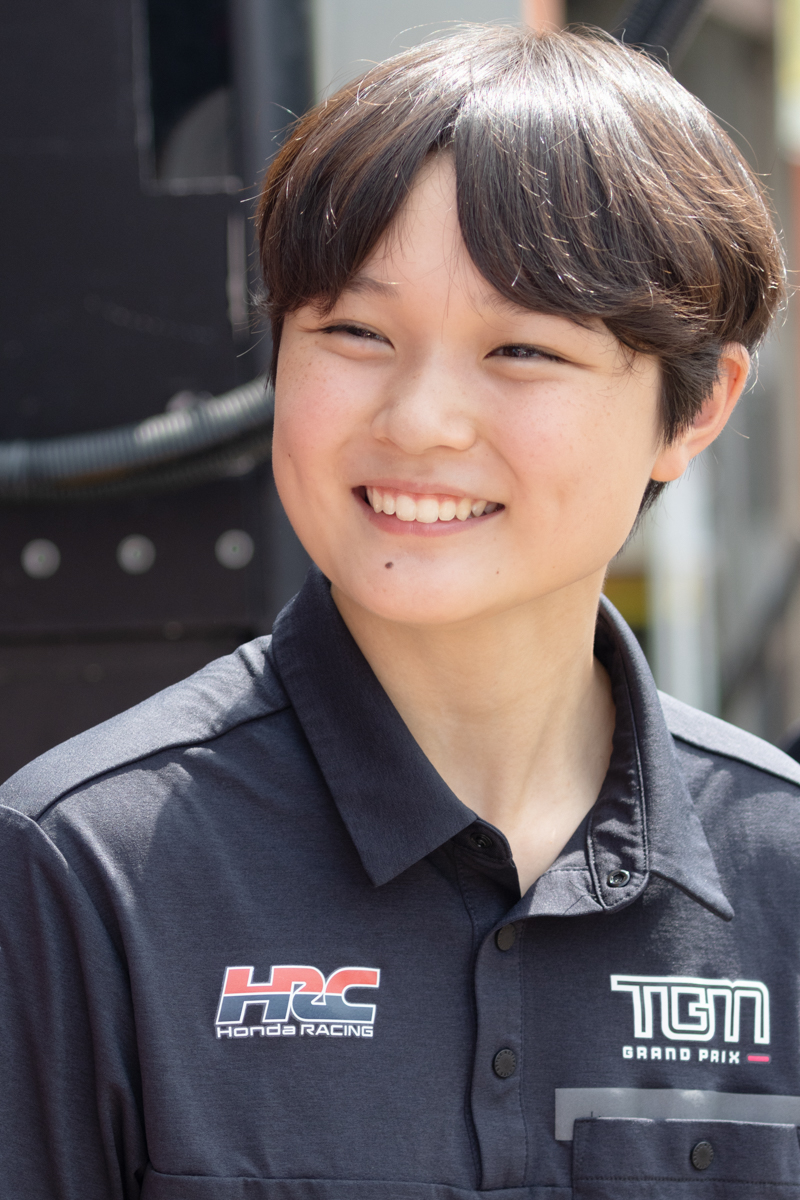
Juju Noda (competing under the mononym "Juju") became the first woman to race in Super Formula since Tatiana Calderón.

- TGM Grand Prix signed Juju Noda to drive its No. 53 car, replacing Toshiki Oyu. Noda became the first Japanese woman and youngest driver to race in the history of the series, after spending 2023 in Euroformula Open, the Drexler-Automotive Formula Cup, and BOSS GP. Before the opening round of the season, TGM signed former B-Max Racing driver Nobuharu Matsushita to drive the No. 55 car. Matsushita replaced Cem Bölükbaşı, who left the series after one year and went on to race in the European Le Mans Series for DKR Engineering.
- Atsushi Miyake rejoined Super Formula after a one-year absence, signing with ThreeBond Racing to replace Nirei Fukuzumi.

==== Mid-season ====
- Théo Pourchaire signed a contract to join Arrow McLaren for the remainder of the 2024 IndyCar Series, and left Team Impul and Super Formula after just one race. Pourchaire would be released from Arrow McLaren after just five races in IndyCar, but would return to the team as an injury replacement for one more race before departing. 2023 IMSA GTD Pro Champion Ben Barnicoat made his series debut at Autopolis, replacing Pourchaire in the No. 19 car.
- 2023 Super Formula Lights and Super GT GT300 runner-up Hibiki Taira debuted at the following round in Sugo to replace Barnicoat, and returned for his second race at Fuji in July.
- Nobuharu Matsushita departed TGM Grand Prix after three races. Hiroki Otsu, who drove for the team as an injury substitute the previous year, returned to replace Matsushita for the remainder of the season.
- 2020–21 Formula E World Champion and Toyota Gazoo Racing WEC driver Nyck de Vries joined team Impul at Mobility Resort Motegi and the October double-header at Fuji Speedway, becoming the fourth different driver in the Impul No. 19 car. Taira would return to finish out the season in the JAF Suzuka Grand Prix double-header.

== Race calendar ==
The provisional calendar was announced on 3 August 2023, with the final two rounds confirmed to be double-headers later on. Fuji Speedway's double-header weekend was later moved from the start of the season to 12–13 October, serving as the sixth and seventh rounds of the championship, which meant Suzuka hosted the opening round of the championship on 10 March. On 25 December 2023, the calendar was slightly amended, with the season finale moved forward by two weeks.

Round	Circuit	Location	Date	Support bill	Map of circuit locations
1	Suzuka International Racing Course	Suzuka, Mie	10 March	All Japan Road Race Championship; Formula Regional Japanese Championship	2024 Super Formula Championship is located in Japan
2	Autopolis	Hita, Oita	19 May	Super Formula Lights; Honda N-One Owner's Cup	2024 Super Formula Championship is located in Japan
3	Sportsland SUGO	Shibata, Miyagi	23 June	Super Formula Lights; Honda N-One Owner's Cup	2024 Super Formula Championship is located in Japan
4	Fuji Speedway	Oyama, Shizuoka	21 July	Super Formula Lights; Porsche Carrera Cup Japan; Kyojo Cup	2024 Super Formula Championship is located in Japan
5	Mobility Resort Motegi	Motegi, Tochigi	25 August	Formula Regional Japanese Championship; All Japan Road Race Championship	2024 Super Formula Championship is located in Japan
6	Fuji Speedway	Oyama, Shizuoka	12 October	Formula Regional Japanese Championship; Honda N-One Owner's Cup	2024 Super Formula Championship is located in Japan
7	Fuji Speedway	Oyama, Shizuoka	13 October	Formula Regional Japanese Championship; Honda N-One Owner's Cup	2024 Super Formula Championship is located in Japan
8	Suzuka International Racing Course	Suzuka, Mie	8–10 November	Super Formula Lights	2024 Super Formula Championship is located in Japan
9	Suzuka International Racing Course	Suzuka, Mie	8–10 November	Super Formula Lights	2024 Super Formula Championship is located in Japan

== Race results ==
Round	Circuit	Pole position	Fastest lap	Winning driver	Winning team
1	Suzuka International Racing Course	(Japan) Sena Sakaguchi	(Japan) Naoki Yamamoto	(Japan) Tomoki Nojiri	(Japan) Team Mugen
2	Autopolis	(Japan) Ayumu Iwasa	(United Kingdom) Ben Barnicoat	(Japan) Tadasuke Makino	(Japan) Docomo Team Dandelion Racing
3	Sportsland SUGO	(Japan) Tomoki Nojiri	(Japan) Tomoki Nojiri	(Japan) Tomoki Nojiri	(Japan) Team Mugen
4	Fuji Speedway	(Japan) Nirei Fukuzumi	(Japan) Tomoki Nojiri	(Japan) Sho Tsuboi	(Japan) Vantelin Team TOM’S
5	Mobility Resort Motegi	(Japan) Kenta Yamashita	(Japan) Naoki Yamamoto	(Japan) Tadasuke Makino	(Japan) Docomo Team Dandelion Racing
6	Fuji Speedway	(Japan) Nirei Fukuzumi	(Japan) Sho Tsuboi	(Japan) Sho Tsuboi	(Japan) Vantelin Team TOM’S
7	Fuji Speedway	(Japan) Sho Tsuboi	(Japan) Sho Tsuboi	(Japan) Sho Tsuboi	(Japan) Vantelin Team TOM’S
8	Suzuka International Racing Course	(Japan) Kakunoshin Ohta	(Japan) Kakunoshin Ohta	(Japan) Kakunoshin Ohta	(Japan) Docomo Team Dandelion Racing
9	Suzuka International Racing Course	(Japan) Tomoki Nojiri	(Japan) Iori Kimura	(Japan) Kakunoshin Ohta	(Japan) Docomo Team Dandelion Racing

== Season report ==
=== First half ===
The 2024 Super Formula Championship began at Suzuka, where Sena Sakaguchi of INGING secured pole position during qualifying. Sakaguchi was overtaken at the start of the race by Tomoki Nojiri from Team Mugen and Ren Sato from Nakajima Racing. The race faced disruption following a collision between Yuji Kunimoto of Team Impul and Kazuto Kotaka of Kondo Racing at the Esses, which resulted in both drivers retiring. After the race resumed, Nojiri maintained his lead and made his pitstop on lap 13. Sato pitted two laps later, only to rejoin the track behind four drivers who had overcut him. This sequence left Nojiri in the lead, ultimately securing his twelfth career victory, ahead of Kenta Yamashita of Kondo Racing and Naoki Yamamoto of Nakajima Racing. Sakaguchi, who delayed his pitstop until lap 19 in hopes of a safety car that did not occur, finished in seventh place.

In the second round of the championship at Autopolis, Iwasa secured pole position, but his start resembled Sakaguchi’s in the first round as he was overtaken by Dandelion Racing’s Tadasuke Makino and Yamamoto. As Yamamoto's defense slowed Iwasa, Makino held a lead of three seconds by the time both drivers made their pit stops on lap 24. This interval allowed Yamamoto and Makino’s teammate, Kakunoshin Ohta, to move ahead of Iwasa. The rookie managed to overtake both competitors over the following ten laps, but Makino had already established a 13-second advantage, securing his first race victory. Sho Tsuboi of Team TOM’S claimed third place, following Iwasa past Yamamoto and Ohta. After an off-track incident, Nojiri finished ninth, resulting in him and Makino sharing the championship lead at 23 points, with Iwasa and Yamamoto trailing with 20 points each.

Sportsland SUGO hosted the third round of the series, marked by persistent wet weather throughout the weekend. Nojiri secured pole position during qualifying. Pre-race drama unfolded as Yamamoto crashed during the warm-up laps, leading to a one-hour delay for barrier repairs. The race commenced under safety car conditions, transitioning to green flag racing after five laps. However, the safety car returned promptly when Kazuya Oshima of ROOKIE Racing crashed, resulting in six additional laps under caution. The subsequent restart was also short-lived, as Sakaguchi fell victim to the challenging conditions at the same corner, prompting a red flag. The race was not restarted and Nojiri was declared the winner, followed by Iwasa and Tsuboi, with only half points awarded. This result placed Nojiri in the championship lead, 6.5 points ahead of Iwasa in second place.

In the fourth round of the championship at Fuji Speedway, Nirei Fukuzumi of KCMG secured pole position. Ayumu Iwasa started alongside him but dropped to 13th after a poor start, allowing Toshiki Oyu of INGING to move into second. Oyu stayed close to Fukuzumi until he pitted on lap 13. Fukuzumi followed but encountered a slow pit stop, which caused him to lose positions. Sho Tsuboi, starting from fourth, delayed his pit stop until lap 28 and rejoined the track behind Oyu, Nojiri and Makino. With fresher tires, Tsuboi quickly overtook the two cars ahead of him within two laps and set out to catch Oyu, gaining over a second per lap. He ultimately passed Oyu to claim his first victory since 2020 and his first win for TOM'S. With Iwasa finishing in 11th place and out of the points, Tsuboi rose to second in the championship standings, 9.5 points behind Nojiri.

Round five of the season was held at Mobility Resort Motegi, where Yamashita took pole position. Ohta started alongside him and opted for an early pit stop as soon as the pit window opened on lap ten. This promoted Makino to second place, who delayed his stop until lap 22, one lap before Yamashita. After the pit stop cycle was complete, Ohta emerged with an eleven-second lead. Makino, however, had moved into second during his pit stop and began his pursuit of Ohta. With two laps remaining, Makino caught Ohta, and the teammates battled for the lead. Ohta appeared poised to secure victory but suffered a throttle issue that caused him to spin out, handing the win to Makino. Yamashita and Nojiri completed the podium. Pre-event championship leader Tsuboi finished fifth, dropping to third in the standings, with Makino now leading Nojiri by five points.

=== Second half ===
The championship returned to Fuji Speedway for a double-header event, where Fukuzumi secured pole position for the first race. He fell to fifth after a slow start, allowing Nojiri to take the lead. Tsuboi, starting seventh, quickly advanced to second in the early laps and maintained close proximity to Nojiri until the pit stops began. Tsuboi's strategic decision to pit two laps later than Nojiri proved pivotal, enabling him to emerge ahead of KCMG’s Kamui Kobayashi, while Nojiri rejoined behind. Early stoppers Iwasa and Ohta briefly led the race, but Tsuboi, on fresher tires, caught and overtook them, claiming the lead on lap 32. He secured his second victory of the season, finishing ahead of Iwasa, with Kobayashi taking third—his first podium since 2019—by overtaking Ohta. Nojiri crossed the line in sixth, with his championship lead over Tsuboi reduced to just half a point.

Tsuboi took pole position for the second race of the weekend. He retained his lead over Fukuzumi, who had quickly passed Nojiri, throughout an early safety car period. Fukuzumi made his pit stop shortly before another safety car was deployed. Tsuboi pitted and preserved his race lead, while Sato moved ahead of Makino in the pits to take third. For 16 laps, Tsuboi defended against Fukuzumi before another safety car was triggered by a significant collision between Sakaguchi and Yamamoto. With only three laps remaining after the restart, Tsuboi maintained his lead to secure his second victory of the weekend. Makino reclaimed third place, leaving him 14.5 points behind new championship leader Tsuboi. Nojiri, who finished seventh after benefiting from post-race penalties imposed on other drivers, dropped to third in the standings, two points further back.

The 2024 season concluded with a double-header event at Suzuka, where Ohta secured pole position for the first race. Iwasa stalled at the start from second on the grid, falling to the back and enabling Ohta to establish a comfortable lead. During the pit stop phase, Sato lost a wheel while exiting the pits and retired, allowing Tsuboi to move into third. He then overcut his closest rival Makino by pitting one lap later to advance to second place. Hibiki Taira’s B-Max car also lost a wheel, triggering a safety car. Despite the interruptions, the top three positions remained unchanged as Ohta maintained his lead in a race characterized by high attrition. Only 14 cars finished, with Ohta holding off the competition after a late restart to claim victory. Tsuboi entered the final race with an 18.5-point buffer over Makino, with 23 points still on offer.

Nojiri secured pole position for the season finale, but Ohta quickly overtook him at the start, reclaiming the lead he had maintained throughout the weekend. Ohta established a five-second advantage over the field before pitting for tires on lap ten. Tsuboi, starting from third, had moved into second and made his pit stop on the following lap. During his outlap, Tsuboi closed the gap to Ohta and applied pressure but was unable to execute an overtake. Ohta then extended his lead once more to claim his second consecutive race victory. Makino, hindered by a poor qualifying session that saw him start tenth, finished eighth, allowing Tsuboi’s second-place finish to secure his first Super Formula Drivers' Championship. Fukuzumi completed the podium, while Nojiri finished fourth, narrowly retaining the championship runner-up spot by a single point over Makino.

Tsuboi secured three race victories, all at Fuji Speedway, along with four additional podium finishes, enabling him to surpass Nojiri, who struggled with pace during the final two double-header rounds, and Makino, who lacked Tsuboi's season-long consistency. Nevertheless, Makino, in partnership with Ohta, led Team Dandelion to its first Teams’ Championship since 2019. This achievement was bolstered by Ohta’s double victory in the season finale and further aided by Tsuboi's teammate, Ukyo Sasahara, failing to score any points. Meanwhile, Iwasa earned the Rookie of the Year title but fell short of matching his Red Bull stablemate Liam Lawson's impressive rookie campaign, finishing the season in fifth place without securing a race win.

== Championship standings ==
Race points

Position	**1st**	**2nd**	**3rd**	**4th**	**5th**	**6th**	**7th**	**8th**	**9th**	**10th**
Points	20	15	11	8	6	5	4	3	2	1

Qualifying points

Position	**1st**	**2nd**	**3rd**
Points	3	2	1

=== Drivers' championship ===
Pos	Driver	SUZ1	AUT	SUG (Note: The race was stopped due to bad weather conditions after less than 75% of laps were completed. Therefore, half points were awarded.)	FUJ1	MOT	FUJ2		SUZ2		Points
1	(Japan) Sho Tsuboi	11	3	3^{3}	1	5	1	**1**^{1}	2	2^{3}	117.5
2	(Japan) Tomoki Nojiri	1^{3}	9	**1**^{1}	3	3	6^{3}	7^{2}	5	**4**^{1}	87
3	(Japan) Tadasuke Makino	10	1^{2}	4	5	1	4	3	3	8	86
4	(Japan) Kakunoshin Ohta	4^{2}	5	14	DNS	19†^{2}	9^{2}	4	**1**^{1}	1^{2}	75
5	(Japan) Ayumu Iwasa	9	**2**^{1}	2^{2}	11^{2}	7	2	6	9^{2}	7	63.5
6	(Japan) Nirei Fukuzumi	6	8	13	**4**^{1}	9	**5**^{1}	2^{3}	6	3	62
7	(Japan) Kenta Yamashita	2	7	6	13	**2**^{1}	10	8	8	9	48.5
8	(Japan) Naoki Yamamoto	3	4^{3}	DNS	10	4	8	Ret	7	6	41
9	(Japan) Toshiki Oyu	16	15	5	2^{3}	6^{3}	Ret	10	10	16	27
10	(Japan) Kamui Kobayashi	19†	10	10	8	12	3	5	14	10	22.5
11	(Japan) Ren Sato	5	Ret	11	7	10	7	DSQ	Ret^{3}	5	22
12	(Japan) Sena Sakaguchi	**7**^{1}	6	12	Ret	Ret	18	Ret	4	13	20
13	(Japan) Yuji Kunimoto	Ret	19†	7	6	11	13	15	13	12	7
14	(Japan) Kazuto Kotaka	Ret	18	8	17	8	16	12	Ret	19	4.5
15	(Japan) Nobuharu Matsushita	8	16	19							3
16	(Japan) Iori Kimura	12	14	9	15	17	Ret	9	11	11	3
17	(Japan) Hibiki Taira			17	9				Ret	17	2
18	(Netherlands) Nyck de Vries					13	11	11			0
19	(Japan) Kazuya Oshima	13	11	Ret	16	14	15	Ret	Ret	15	0
20	(Japan) Ukyo Sasahara	15	12	16	12	16	12	14	15†	14	0
21	(Japan) "Juju"	17	20	18	19	18	17	16	12	20	0
22	(Japan) Hiroki Otsu				14	15	19	13	Ret	Ret	0
23	(United Kingdom) Ben Barnicoat		13								0
24	(Japan) Atsushi Miyake	14	17	15	18	20	14	Ret	Ret	18	0
25	(France) Théo Pourchaire	18									0
Pos	Driver	SUZ1	AUT	SUG	FUJ1	MOT	FUJ2		SUZ2		Points

Key
Colour	Result
Gold	Winner
Silver	Second place
Bronze	Third place
Green	Other points position
Blue	Other classified position
Blue	Not classified, finished (NC)
Purple	Not classified, retired (Ret)
Red	Did not qualify (DNQ)
Red	Did not pre-qualify (DNPQ)
Black	Disqualified (DSQ)
White	Did not start (DNS)
White	Race cancelled (C)
Blank	Did not practice (DNP)
Blank	Excluded (EX)
Blank	Did not arrive (DNA)
Blank	Withdrawn (WD)
Blank	Did not enter (cell empty)
Text formatting	Meaning
**Bold**	Pole position
Italics	Fastest lap

=== Teams' championship ===
Pos	Team	SUZ1	AUT	SUG	FUJ1	MOT	FUJ2		SUZ2		Points
1	(Japan) Docomo Team Dandelion Racing	4	1	4	5	1	4	3	1	1	148
1	(Japan) Docomo Team Dandelion Racing	10	5	14	DNS	19†	9	4	3	8	148
2	(Japan) Team Mugen	1	2	1	3	3	2	6	5	4	131.5
2	(Japan) Team Mugen	9	9	2	11	7	6	7	9	7	131.5
3	(Japan) Vantelin Team TOM’S	11	3	3	1	5	1	1	2	2	112.5
3	(Japan) Vantelin Team TOM’S	15	12	16	12	16	12	14	15†	14	112.5
4	(Hong Kong) Kids com Team KCMG	6	8	10	4	9	3	2	6	3	77.5
4	(Hong Kong) Kids com Team KCMG	19†	10	13	8	12	5	5	14	10	77.5
5	(Japan) PONOS Nakajima Racing	3	4	11	7	4	7	15	7	5	61
5	(Japan) PONOS Nakajima Racing	5	Ret	DNS	10	10	8	DSQ	Ret	6	61
6	(Japan) Kondo Racing	2	7	6	13	2	10	8	8	9	50
6	(Japan) Kondo Racing	Ret	18	8	17	8	16	12	Ret	19	50
7	(Japan) Vertex Partners Cerumo・INGING	7	6	5	2	6	18	10	4	13	42
7	(Japan) Vertex Partners Cerumo・INGING	16	15	12	Ret	Ret	Ret	Ret	10	16	42
8	(Japan) Itochu Enex Team Impul	18	13	7	6	11	11	11	13	12	9
8	(Japan) Itochu Enex Team Impul	Ret	19†	17	9	13	13	15	Ret	17	9
9	(Japan) TGM Grand Prix	8	16	18	14	15	17	13	12	20	3
9	(Japan) TGM Grand Prix	17	20	19	19	18	19	16	Ret	Ret	3
10	(Japan) San-Ei Gen with B-Max	12	14	9	15	17	Ret	9	11	11	3
11	(Japan) docomo business ROOKIE	13	11	Ret	16	14	15	Ret	Ret	15	0
12	(Japan) ThreeBond Racing	14	17	15	18	20	14	Ret	Ret	18	0
Pos	Team	SUZ1	AUT	SUG	FUJ1	MOT	FUJ2		SUZ2		Points
