= Dandelion Racing =

Japanese car racing team

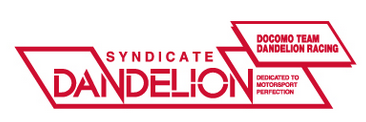
- Founded: 1993
- Base: Kameoka, Kyoto Prefecture
- Team principal(s): Kiyoshi Muraoka
- Current series: Super Formula
- Former series: JTCC; Japanese Formula 3 Championship
- Current drivers: (Japan) Tadasuke Makino; (Japan) Kakunoshin Ohta
- Teams' Championships: Super Formula: 2012, 2019, 2024, 2025, 2026
- Drivers' Championships: Super Formula: 2004: Richard Lyons; 2020: Naoki Yamamoto; 2026: Kakunoshin Ohta

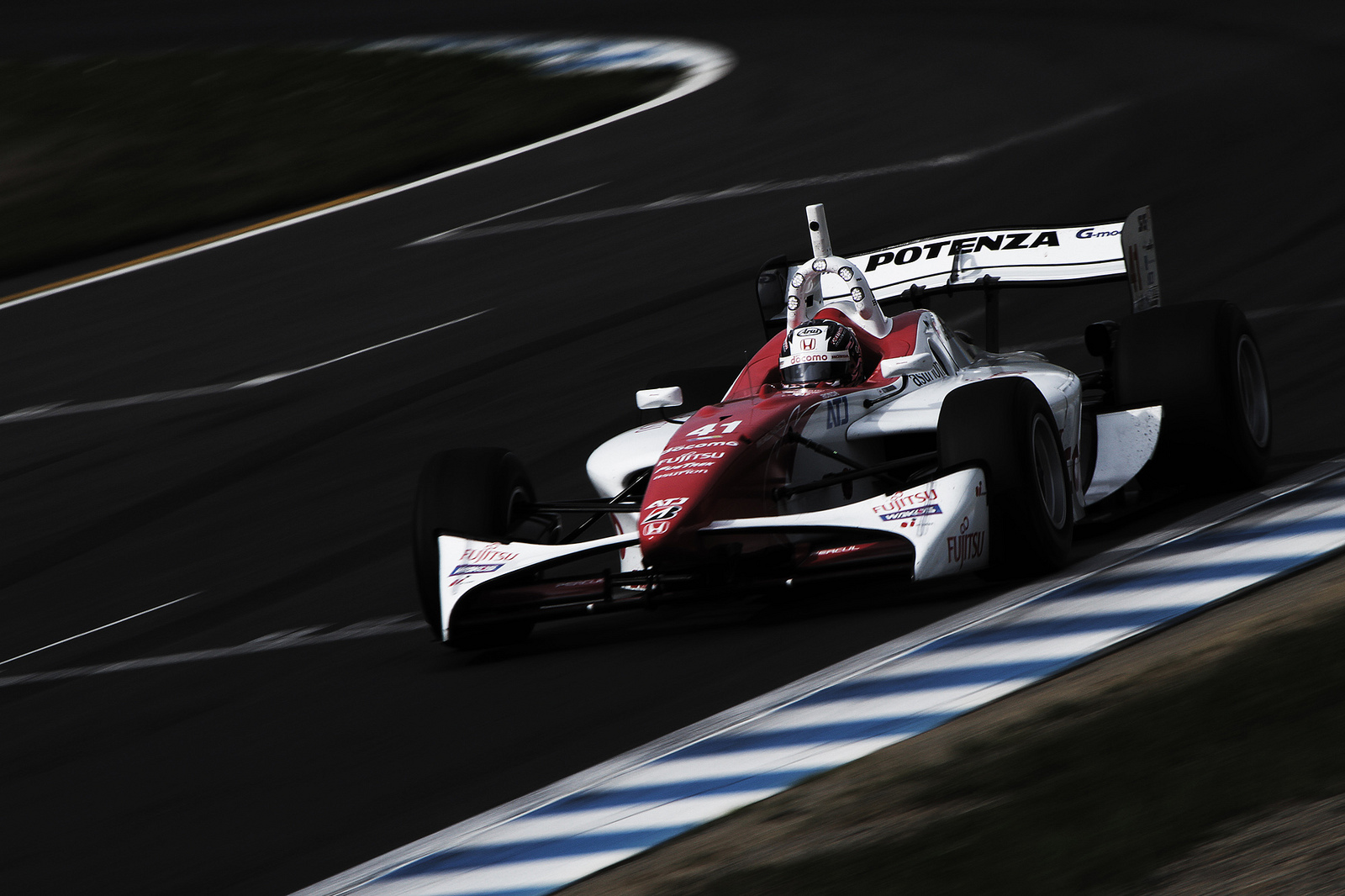
Koudai Tsukakoshi driving the Honda-powered Swift 017.n for Dandelion Racing in 2012

Dandelion Racing is a Japanese racing team, mainly running in Super Formula. The team was founded by Kiyoshi Muraoka in 1989 as "Dandelion Racing Project".

== Early years (1993–1998) ==
The team made a small sponsor contract with NTT Docomo in 1993. It made a way to enter the Japanese local racing series. The team ran in the All-Japan Formula Three Championship (1993 and 1994 seasons) and Japanese Touring Car Championship (1995, 1996, 1997, and 1998), and suffered from poor results through the 1990s.

The relationship with NTT Docomo will continue to date, though there is no capital ties.

== Formula Nippon/Super Formula (1999–) ==
In 1999, the team switched from the defunct JTCC to Formula Nippon as a Honda engine user. Though the team continuously suffered from poor result at first, the fortune was changed in the 2002 season when Richard Lyons scored team's first point-finish in the series with finishing 2nd at the SUGO round.

In the 2003 season, Lyons won the Suzuka round in July. It was also the first race win for the team. In the 2004 season, Lyons became the drivers' champion of the series and the team finished as 3rd in the teams' championship. During the following years, the team came to leave steady results. In 2012, the last season of Formula Nippon, the team became the teams' champion of the series with beating TOM'S at the final round of the season.

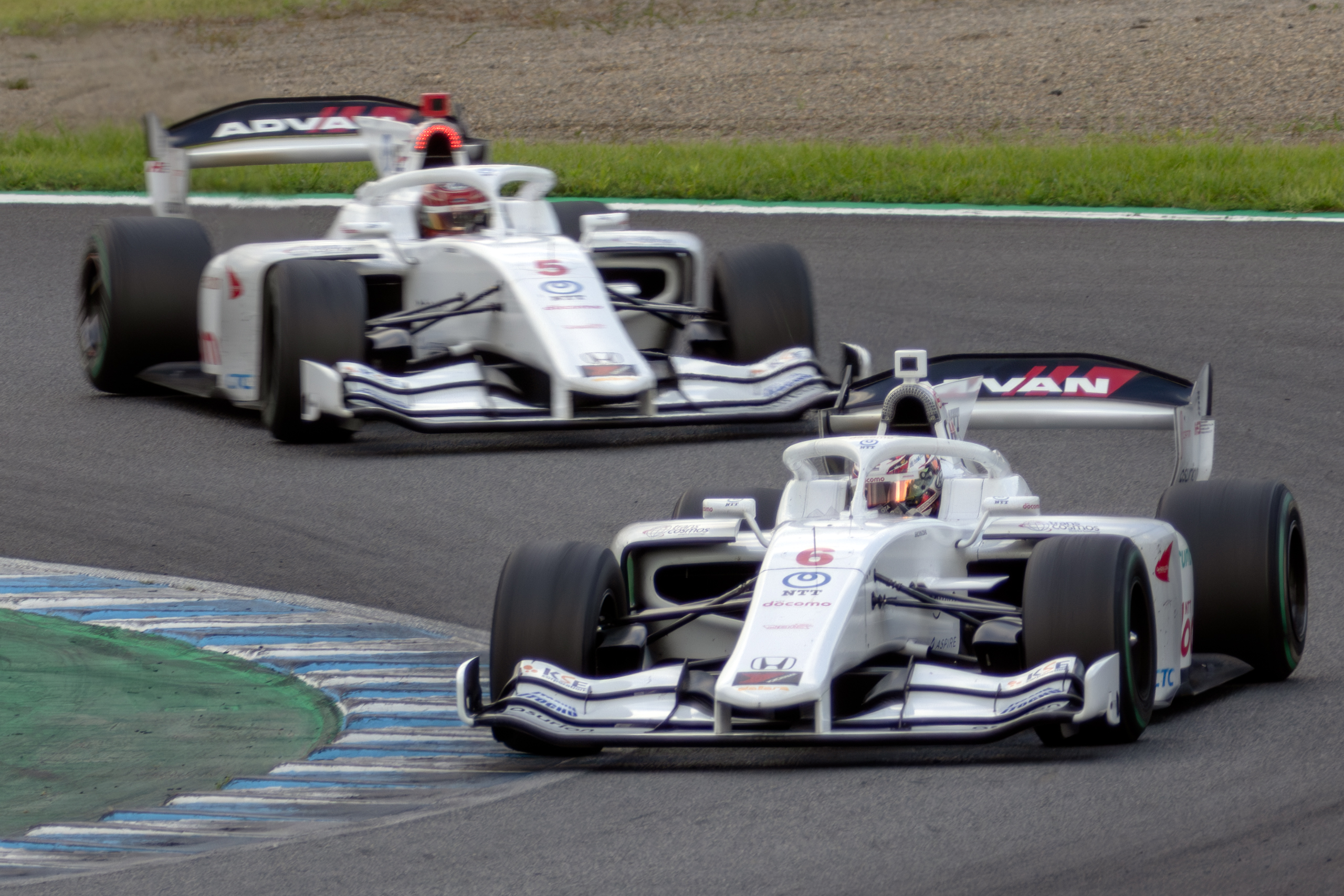
Kakunoshin Ohta and Tadasuke Makino driving for Dandelion Racing in 2024.

Nobuharu Matsushita returned to Japan after two seasons in the GP2 Series and one season in the FIA Formula 2 Championship, joining the team. He takes the seat of Takuya Izawa, who moved to Nakajima Racing. 2018 champion Naoki Yamamoto moves to the team in 2019 after eight seasons driving for Team Mugen. He is joined by Nirei Fukuzumi, who completed a partial season with Mugen in 2018 alongside FIA Formula 2. Nobuharu Matsushita leaves Team Dandelion after a single season, returning to Formula 2 with Carlin. Yamamoto won his title in 2020, and the teams title in 2019. Yamamoto only stayed with the team for 2 seasons, and he replaced by Tadasuke Makino. Fukuzumi clinched runners up in 2021, then he replaced by Rookie champion Hiroki Otsu for 2022. Otsu then replaced by Kakunoshin Ohta.

== Formula Nippon/Super Formula results ==
(key) (Races in bold indicate pole position) (Races in italics indicate fastest lap)

| Year | Chassis | Engine | No. | Drivers | 1 | 2 | 3 | 4 | 5 | 6 | 7 | 8 | 9 | 10 | 11 | 12 | D.C. | Pts | T.C. | Pts |
Formula Nippon
| 1999 | Reynard 99L | Mugen | 68 | (Argentina) Rubén Derfler | SUZ; Ret | MOT; 11 | MIN; 9 | FUJ; 17 | SUZ; 12 | SUG; 14 | FUJ; Ret | MIN; Ret | MOT; Ret | SUZ; 15 | | | 22nd | 0 | 12th | 0 |
| 2000 | Reynard 2KL | Mugen | 68 | (Japan) Ryo Michigami | SUZ; Ret | MOT; 13 | MIN; Ret | FUJ; Ret | SUZ; 10 | SUG; Ret | MOT; 8 | FUJ; 7 | MIN; 9 | SUZ; Ret | | | 16th | 0 | 11th | 0 |
| 2001 | Reynard 2KL | Mugen | 68 | (Japan) Hideki Noda | SUZ; Ret | MOT; Ret | MIN; Ret | FUJ; 13 | SUZ; 12 | SUG; Ret | FUJ; 13 | MIN; Ret | MOT; Ret | SUZ; 11 | | | 21st | 0 | 11th | 0 |
| 2001 | Reynard 99L | Mugen | 69 | (Poland) Jaroslaw Wierczuk | SUZ; 14 | MOT; Ret | MIN; 13 | FUJ; DNS | | | | | | | | | 22nd | 0 | 11th | 0 |
| 2001 | Reynard 99L | Mugen | 69 | (Japan) Hidetoshi Mitsusada | | | | | SUZ; 13 | SUG | FUJ | MIN | MOT | SUZ | | | 23rd | 0 | 11th | 0 |
| 2002 | Reynard 2KL | Mugen | 68 | (France) Jonathan Cochet | SUZ; 13 | FUJ; 8 | | | | | | | | | | | 19th | 0 | 6th | 6 |
| 2002 | Reynard 2KL | Mugen | 68 | (United Kingdom) Richard Lyons | | | MIN; 7 | SUZ; 8 | MOT; 11 | SUG; 2 | FUJ; 7 | MIN; Ret | MOT; 7 | SUZ; Ret | | | 10th | 6 | 6th | 6 |
| 2003 | Lola B3/51 | Mugen | 40 | (United Kingdom) Richard Lyons | SUZ; 9 | FUJ; Ret | MIN; Ret | MOT; 3 | SUZ; 1 | SUG; 5 | FUJ; Ret | MIN; Ret | MOT; 3 | SUZ; 9 | | | 6th | 20 | 6th | 23 |
| 2003 | Lola B3/51 | Mugen | 41 | (Japan) Naoki Hattori | SUZ; 8 | FUJ; Ret | MIN; Ret | MOT; 11 | SUZ; 8 | SUG; 9 | FUJ; 9 | MIN; 4 | MOT; 7 | SUZ; 11 | | | 13th | 3 | 6th | 23 |
| 2004 | Lola B3/51 | Mugen | 40 | (United Kingdom) Richard Lyons | SUZ; 8 | **SUG**; 1 | **MOT**; 8 | **SUZ**; 1 | **SUG**; 4 | MIN; 8 | SEP; 9 | MOT; 2 | **SUZ**; 3 | | | | **1st** | **33** | 3rd | 40 |
| 2004 | Lola B3/51 | Mugen | 41 | (Japan) Naoki Hattori | SUZ; 7 | SUG; 7 | MOT; Ret | SUZ; 10 | SUG; 6 | MIN; 10 | SEP; 2 | MOT; Ret | SUZ; 10 | | | | 9th | 7 | 3rd | 40 |
| 2005 | Lola B3/51 | Mugen | 1 | (United Kingdom) Richard Lyons | MOT; 1 | SUZ; 5 | SUG; 2 | **FUJ**; 4 | SUZ; 3 | MIN; Ret | **FUJ**; 4 | MOT; 13 | SUZ; 5 | | | | **3rd** | **30** | 2nd | 37 |
| 2005 | Lola B3/51 | Mugen | 2 | (Japan) Naoki Hattori | MOT; 3 | SUZ; 6 | SUG; 6 | FUJ; 10 | SUZ; 7 | MIN; 6 | FUJ; 7 | MOT; 7 | SUZ; 14 | | | | 12th | 7 | 2nd | 37 |
| 2006 | Lola FN06 | Honda | 40 | (Sweden) Björn Wirdheim | FUJ; 4 | SUZ; 2 | MOT; 4 | SUZ; Ret | AUT; 6 | FUJ; 6 | SUG; 6 | MOT; 11 | SUZ; 9 | | | | 6th | 13.5 | 5th | 13.5 |
| 2006 | Lola FN06 | Honda | 41 | (Japan) Katsuyuki Hiranaka | FUJ; 17 | SUZ; 11 | MOT; Ret | | | | | | | | | | 22nd | 0 | 5th | 13.5 |
| 2006 | Lola FN06 | Honda | 41 | (Japan) Yuji Ide | | | | SUZ; 12 | AUT; 12 | FUJ; 11 | SUG; Ret | MOT; Ret | SUZ; 10 | | | | 21st | 0 | 5th | 13.5 |
| 2007 | Lola FN06 | Honda | 40 | (Sweden) Björn Wirdheim | FUJ; 4 | SUZ; 13 | MOT; 11 | OKA; 11 | SUZ; 2 | FUJ; 8 | SUG; Ret | MOT; 7 | SUZ; 8 | | | | 9th | 17 | 6th | 20 |
| 2007 | Lola FN06 | Honda | 41 | (Brazil) Fabio Carbone | FUJ; 15 | SUZ; 15 | MOT; Ret | OKA; 13 | SUZ; 6 | FUJ; 15 | SUG; 9 | MOT; 18 | SUZ; Ret | | | | 15th | 3 | 6th | 20 |
| 2008 | Lola FN06 | Honda | 40 | (Japan) Kosuke Matsuura | FUJ; 12 | SUZ; 16 | MOT; 12 | OKA; 13 | SUZ; 9 | SUZ; Ret | MOT; 10 | MOT; 6 | FUJ; 8 | **FUJ**; 1 | SUG; 13 | | 18th | 3.5 | 11th | 7.5 |
| 2008 | Lola FN06 | Honda | 41 | (Japan) Takeshi Tsuchiya | FUJ; 8 | SUZ; 14 | MOT; 14 | OKA; 12 | SUZ; 16 | SUZ; Ret | MOT; 8 | **MOT**; 14 | FUJ; 11 | FUJ; 11 | SUG; 14 | | 17th | 4 | 11th | 7.5 |
| 2009 | Swift 017.n | Honda | 40 | (United Kingdom) Richard Lyons | FUJ; Ret | SUZ; 6 | MOT; 7 | FUJ; 3 | SUZ; 13 | MOT; Ret | AUT; 10 | SUG; 13 | | | | | 10th | 11 | 6th | 25 |
| 2009 | Swift 017.n | Honda | 41 | (Japan) Takuya Izawa | FUJ; 2 | SUZ; 7 | MOT; DNS | FUJ; Ret | SUZ; 8 | MOT; 9 | AUT; 6 | SUG; 11 | | | | | 8th | 14 | 6th | 25 |
| 2010 | Swift 017.n | Honda | 1 | (France) Loïc Duval | SUZ; 6 | MOT; 4 | **FUJ**; 14 | MOT; 1 | **SUG**; 2 | AUT; DNS | **SUZ**; 1 | SUZ; 4 | | | | | **3rd** | **39.5** | 4th | 40.5 |
| 2010 | Swift 017.n | Honda | 2 | (Japan) Takuya Izawa | SUZ; 5 | MOT; 11 | FUJ; 9 | MOT; 11 | SUG; 6 | AUT; DNS | SUZ; 11 | SUZ; 11 | | | | | 11th | 7 | 4th | 40.5 |
| 2011 | Swift 017.n | Honda | 40 | (Japan) Takuya Izawa | SUZ; 4 | AUT; 6 | FUJ; 10 | MOT; 6 | SUZ; C | SUG; DSQ | MOT; Ret | MOT; 10 | | | | | 9th | 11 | 3rd | 36.5 |
| 2011 | Swift 017.n | Honda | 41 | (Japan) Koudai Tsukakoshi | SUZ; 7 | **AUT**; 3 | FUJ; 5 | MOT; 4 | SUZ; C | SUG; 4 | MOT1; 3 | MOT2; 8 | | | | | 4th | 26.5 | 3rd | 36.5 |
| 2012 | Swift 017.n | Honda | 40 | (Japan) Takuya Izawa | **SUZ**; 6 | MOT; 4 | AUT; 2 | FUJ; 13 | MOT; 5 | **SUG**; 1 | SUZ; 1 | SUZ; 6 | | | | | 3rd | 41.5 | 1st | 78.5 |
| 2012 | Swift 017.n | Honda | 41 | (Japan) Koudai Tsukakoshi | SUZ; 2 | MOT; 5 | **AUT**; 1 | FUJ; 9 | MOT; 3 | SUG; 2 | SUZ1; 3 | SUZ2; 3 | | | | | 2nd | 43 | 1st | 78.5 |
Super Formula
| 2013 | Swift SF13 | Honda | 40 | (Japan) Takuya Izawa | **SUZ**; 1 | AUT; Ret | FUJ; 5 | MOT; Ret | SUG; Ret | SUZ; 10 | SUZ; 9 | | | | | | 7th | 15 | 7th | 15 |
| 2013 | Swift SF13 | Honda | 41 | (Japan) Hideki Mutoh | SUZ; 13 | AUT; Ret | FUJ; 13 | MOT; 12 | SUG; 10 | SUZ1; 12 | SUZ2; 10 | | | | | | NC | 0 | 7th | 15 |
| 2014 | Dallara SF14 | Honda | 40 | (Japan) Tomoki Nojiri | SUZ; 9 | FUJ; Ret | FUJ; 15 | FUJ; 12 | MOT; 9 | AUT; 9 | SUG; 1 | SUZ; 12 | SUZ; 9 | | | | 10th | 10 | 6th | 14 |
| 2014 | Dallara SF14 | Honda | 41 | (Japan) Hideki Mutoh | SUZ; 10 | FUJ; 10 | FUJ; 12 | FUJ; 11 | MOT; 5 | AUT; 10 | SUG; 12 | SUZ; 13 | SUZ; 12 | | | | 15th | 4 | 6th | 14 |
| 2015 | Dallara SF14 | Honda | 40 | (Japan) Tomoki Nojiri | SUZ; 8 | OKA; 3 | FUJ; 8 | MOT; 6 | AUT; 10 | SUG; 3 | SUZ; 5 | SUZ; Ret | | | | | 7th | 19 | 5th | 25 |
| 2015 | Dallara SF14 | Honda | 41 | (India) Narain Karthikeyan | SUZ; 3 | OKA; 10 | FUJ; Ret | MOT; 9 | AUT; 14 | SUG; 13 | SUZ; 12 | SUZ; 14 | | | | | 11th | 6 | 5th | 25 |
| 2016 | Dallara SF14 | Honda | 40 | (Japan) Tomoki Nojiri | SUZ; 9 | OKA; 4 | FUJ; 13 | MOT; Ret | OKA; 4 | **OKA**; 16 | SUG; 3 | SUZ; 4 | SUZ; Ret | | | | 9th | 14.5 | 4th | 36.5 |
| 2016 | Dallara SF14 | Honda | 41 | (Belgium) Stoffel Vandoorne | SUZ; 3 | OKA; 12 | **FUJ**; Ret | MOT; 6 | OKA; 1 | OKA; 7 | SUG; 6 | SUZ; 17 | SUZ; 1 | | | | 4th | 27 | 4th | 36.5 |
| 2017 | Dallara SF14 | Honda | 40 | (Japan) Tomoki Nojiri | SUZ; 16 | OKA; 13 | OKA; 10 | FUJ; 10 | MOT; 8 | **AUT**; 14 | SUG; 12 | SUZ; C | SUZ; C | | | | 17th | 2 | 8th | 6 |
| 2017 | Dallara SF14 | Honda | 41 | (Japan) Takuya Izawa | SUZ; 8 | OKA; 14 | OKA; Ret | FUJ; 6 | MOT; Ret | AUT; 15 | SUG; 8 | SUZ; C | SUZ; C | | | | 13th | 5 | 8th | 6 |
| 2018 | Dallara SF14 | Honda | 5 | (Japan) Tomoki Nojiri | SUZ; 3 | AUT; C | **SUG**; 7 | FUJ; 14 | MOT; 8 | OKA; 4 | SUZ; 9 | | | | | | 7th | 12.5 | 5th | 18.5 |
| 2018 | Dallara SF14 | Honda | 6 | (Japan) Nobuharu Matsushita | SUZ; 12 | AUT; C | SUG; 10 | FUJ; 9 | MOT; 4 | OKA; 9 | SUZ; 7 | | | | | | 11th | 7 | 5th | 18.5 |
| 2019 | Dallara SF19 | Honda | 1 | (Japan) Naoki Yamamoto | SUZ; 2 | AUT; 2 | **SUG**; 1 | FUJ; 11 | MOT; 9 | OKA; 7 | SUZ; 5 | | | | | | 2nd | 33 | 1st | 50 |
| 2019 | Dallara SF19 | Honda | 5 | (Japan) Nirei Fukuzumi | SUZ; 11 | AUT; 5 | SUG; 5 | FUJ; 9 | MOT; 5 | OKA; Ret | SUZ; 3 | | | | | | 7th | 18 | 1st | 50 |
| 2020 | Dallara SF19 | Honda | 5 | (Japan) Naoki Yamamoto | MOT; 13 | OKA; 6 | SUG; 3 | AUT; 2 | **SUZ**; 1 | SUZ; Ret | FUJ; 5 | | | | | | 1st | 62 | 3rd | 72 |
| 2020 | Dallara SF19 | Honda | 6 | (Japan) Nirei Fukuzumi | MOT; 5 | OKA; 8 | SUG; 10 | AUT; 9 | SUZ; Ret | SUZ; 2 | FUJ; 16 | | | | | | 8th | 29 | 3rd | 72 |
| 2021 | Dallara SF19 | Honda | 5 | (Japan) Nirei Fukuzumi | FUJ; 3 | **SUZ**; Ret | AUT; 13 | SUG; 1 | MOT; Ret | MOT2; 12 | SUZ2; 1 | | | | | | 2nd | 55 | 2nd | 86 |
| 2021 | Dallara SF19 | Honda | 6 | (Japan) Ukyo Sasahara | MOT; 5 | SUZ; 3 | | | | | | | | | | | 12th | 18 | 2nd | 86 |
| 2021 | Dallara SF19 | Honda | 6 | (Japan) Tadasuke Makino | | | AUT; 14 | SUG; 5 | MOT; 7 | MOT2; 3 | SUZ2; 10 | | | | | | 9th | 24 | 2nd | 86 |
| 2022 | Dallara SF19 | Honda | 5 | (Japan) Tadasuke Makino | FUJ; 6 | FUJ; Ret | SUZ; 3 | AUT; 6 | SUG; 4 | FUJ; 5 | MOT; 4 | MOT; 3 | SUZ; 7 | SUZ; 9 | | | 5th | 61 | 4th | 91 |
| 2022 | Dallara SF19 | Honda | 6 | (Japan) Hiroki Otsu | FUJ; 16 | FUJ; 7 | SUZ; 8 | AUT; 9 | SUG; 5 | FUJ; 15 | MOT; 10 | MOT; 13 | SUZ; 13 | SUZ; 2 | | | 9th | 33 | 4th | 91 |
| 2023 | Dallara SF23 | Honda | 5 | (Japan) Tadasuke Makino | FUJ; 14 | FUJ; 8 | SUZ; 15 | AUT; 6 | SUG; 3 | **FUJ**; 2 | MOT; Ret | SUZ; 4‡ | SUZ; 10 | | | | 6th | 43 | 3rd | 69.5 |
| 2023 | Dallara SF23 | Honda | 6 | (Japan) Kakunoshin Ohta | FUJ; 15 | FUJ; 19 | SUZ; 17 | AUT; 16 | SUG; 15 | FUJ; 6 | MOT; Ret | SUZ; 3 | SUZ; 1 | | | | 7th | 35.5 | 3rd | 69.5 |
| 2024 | Dallara SF23 | Honda | 5 | (Japan) Tadasuke Makino | SUZ; 10 | AUT; 1 | SUG; 4‡ | FUJ; 5 | MOT; 1 | FUJ; 4 | FUJ; 3 | SUZ; 3 | SUZ; 8 | | | | 3rd | 86 | 1st | 148 |
| 2024 | Dallara SF23 | Honda | 6 | (Japan) Kakunoshin Ohta | SUZ; 4 | AUT; 5 | SUG; 14 | FUJ; DNS | MOT; 19† | FUJ; 9 | FUJ; 4 | SUZ; 1 | SUZ; 1 | | | | 4th | 75 | 1st | 148 |
| 2025 | Dallara SF23 | Honda | 5 | (Japan) Tadasuke Makino | SUZ; 10 | SUZ; 1 | MOT; 1 | MOT; 2 | AUT; 6 | FUJ; 5 | FUJ; 9 | SUG; 10 | FUJ; 4 | SUZ; 3 | SUZ; 2 | SUZ; 5 | 4th | 113 | 1st | 148 |
| 2025 | Dallara SF23 | Honda | 6 | (Japan) Kakunoshin Ohta | SUZ; 1 | SUZ; 12 | MOT; 2 | MOT; 1 | AUT; 13 | FUJ; 10 | FUJ; 1 | SUG; 8 | FUJ; 7 | SUZ; 5 | SUZ; 3 | SUZ; 3 | 3rd | 118 | 1st | 148 |

== Notable and veteran drivers ==
=== Formula Nippon/Super Formula ===
- (United Kingdom) Richard Lyons (2002–2005, 2009)
- (Japan) Naoki Hattori (2003–2005)
- (Japan) Takuya Izawa (2009–2013, 2017)
- (Japan) Tomoki Nojiri (2014–2018)
- (Belgium) Stoffel Vandoorne (2016)
