= 2017 Super Formula Championship =

Formula racing championship

The 2017 Japanese Super Formula Championship was the forty-fifth season of premier Japanese open-wheel motor racing, and the fifth under the moniker of Super Formula. Yuji Kunimoto was the defending series champion.

Hiroaki Ishiura won his second Driver's Championship in three years, finishing only half a point ahead of Pierre Gasly after the final round was cancelled due to Typhoon Lan. The Cerumo INGING team won their second successive Team Championship.

== Teams and drivers ==
Every Honda-powered car used a Honda HR-414E engine and every Toyota-powered car used a Toyota RI4A engine.

Manufacturer	Engine	No.	Driver	Rounds
(Japan) P.mu/cerumo・INGING	Toyota	1	(Japan) Yuji Kunimoto	All
(Japan) P.mu/cerumo・INGING	Toyota	2	(Japan) Hiroaki Ishiura	All
(Japan) Kondō Racing	Toyota	3	(New Zealand) Nick Cassidy	All
(Japan) Kondō Racing	Toyota	4	(Japan) Kenta Yamashita	All
(Japan) SUNOCO Team LeMans	Toyota	7	(Sweden) Felix Rosenqvist	All
(Japan) SUNOCO Team LeMans	Toyota	8	(Japan) Kazuya Oshima	All
(Japan) Real Racing	Honda	10	(Japan) Koudai Tsukakoshi	All
(Japan) Team Mugen	Honda	15	(France) Pierre Gasly	All
(Japan) Team Mugen	Honda	16	(Japan) Naoki Yamamoto	All
(Hong Kong) KCMG	Toyota	18	(Japan) Kamui Kobayashi	All
(Japan) Itochu Enex Team Impul	Toyota	19	(Japan) Yuhi Sekiguchi	All
(Japan) Itochu Enex Team Impul	Toyota	20	(United Kingdom) Jann Mardenborough	All
(Japan) Vantelin Team Tom's	Toyota	36	(Germany) André Lotterer	All
(Japan) Vantelin Team Tom's	Toyota	37	(Japan) Kazuki Nakajima	All
(Japan) Docomo Team Dandelion Racing	Honda	40	(Japan) Tomoki Nojiri	All
(Japan) Docomo Team Dandelion Racing	Honda	41	(Japan) Takuya Izawa	All
(Japan) B-MAX Racing Team	Honda	50	(Japan) Takashi Kogure	All
(Japan) TCS Nakajima Racing	Honda	64	(Japan) Daisuke Nakajima	All
(Japan) TCS Nakajima Racing	Honda	65	(India) Narain Karthikeyan	All

=== Driver changes ===
Leaving Super Formula

- Stoffel Vandoorne will leave the series to compete in Formula One with McLaren.
- Bertrand Baguette will leave the series to compete in Super GT Series.
- Yuichi Nakayama is replaced at the single car KCMG team by Kamui Kobayashi.
- Joao Paulo de Oliveira, 2010 Formula Nippon champion, leaves after seven seasons with Team Impul and ten in the series.

Entering Super Formula

- 2016 GP2 Series champion, Red Bull Racing and Scuderia Toro Rosso reserve driver Pierre Gasly moved to Super Formula with Team Mugen. He replaced Daniil Kvyat at Scuderia Toro Rosso from the 2017 Malaysian Grand Prix, but skipped the 2017 United States Grand Prix to finish the Super Formula season.
- Nick Cassidy and Kenta Yamashita, the 2015 and 2016 Japanese Formula 3 champions, join the series with Kondo Racing, replacing James Rossiter and William Buller.
- GT Academy winner Jann Mardenborough makes his series debut with Team Impul.
- 2015 European F3 champion Felix Rosenqvist joins the series. He is joined at Team LeMans by Kazuya Oshima, making his full-time return to Super Formula for the first time since 2012.

== Race calendar ==
Round		Circuit	Date	Pole position	Fastest lap	Winning driver	Winning team
1		Suzuka Circuit	23 April	(Japan) Kazuki Nakajima	(Japan) Koudai Tsukakoshi	(Japan) Kazuki Nakajima	Vantelin Team Tom's
2	R1	Okayama International Circuit	27 May	(Japan) Yuhi Sekiguchi	(Sweden) Felix Rosenqvist	(Germany) André Lotterer	Vantelin Team Tom's
2	R2	Okayama International Circuit	28 May	(Japan) Hiroaki Ishiura	(Japan) Kamui Kobayashi	(Japan) Yuhi Sekiguchi	Itochu Enex Team Impul
3		Fuji Speedway	9 July	(Japan) Yuji Kunimoto	(Sweden) Felix Rosenqvist	(Japan) Hiroaki Ishiura	P.mu/cerumo・INGING
4		Twin Ring Motegi	20 August	(Japan) Kenta Yamashita	(Japan) Koudai Tsukakoshi	(France) Pierre Gasly	Team Mugen
5		Autopolis	10 September	(Japan) Tomoki Nojiri	(United Kingdom) Jann Mardenborough	(France) Pierre Gasly	Team Mugen
6		Sportsland SUGO	24 September	(New Zealand) Nick Cassidy	(Japan) Hiroaki Ishiura	(Japan) Yuhi Sekiguchi	Itochu Enex Team Impul
7	R1	Suzuka Circuit	22 October	(Germany) André Lotterer	Races cancelled due to Typhoon Lan		
7	R2	Suzuka Circuit	22 October	(United Kingdom) Jann Mardenborough	Races cancelled due to Typhoon Lan		

== Championship standings ==
=== Drivers' Championship ===
Scoring system

	1	2	3	4	5	6	7	8	**Pole**
Rounds 1, 3–6	10	8	6	5	4	3	2	1	1
Round 2	5	4	3	2.5	2	1.5	1	0.5	1
Round 7	8	4	3	2.5	2	1.5	1	0.5	1

Driver standings

Pos	Driver	SUZ	OKA		FUJ	MOT	AUT	SUG	SUZ		Points
1	(Japan) Hiroaki Ishiura	4	8	**2**	1	4	4	6	C	C	33.5
2	(France) Pierre Gasly	10	19	7	5	1	1	2	C	C	33
3	(Sweden) Felix Rosenqvist	11	12	4	2	3	2	5	C	C	28.5
4	(Japan) Yuhi Sekiguchi	12	**2**	1	4	16	10	1	C	C	25
5	(Japan) Kazuki Nakajima	**1**	9	18	7	11	6	3	C	C	22
6	(Germany) André Lotterer	5	1	3	3	7	Ret	10	**C**	C	21
7	(Japan) Kamui Kobayashi	9	4	5	15	2	7	7	C	C	16.5
8	(Japan) Yuji Kunimoto	3	10	9	**Ret**	15	5	4	C	C	16
9	(Japan) Naoki Yamamoto	2	5	8	Ret	13	16	18	C	C	10.5
10	(New Zealand) Nick Cassidy	17	3	11	Ret	5	Ret	**19**	C	C	8
11	(Japan) Kenta Yamashita	14	7	6	Ret	**6**	13	11	C	C	6.5
12	(Japan) Kazuya Oshima	Ret	15	12	12	10	3	15	C	C	6
13	(Japan) Takuya Izawa	8	14	Ret	6	Ret	15	8	C	C	5
14	(United Kingdom) Jann Mardenborough	18	6	17	8	14	8	9	C	**C**	4.5
15	(Japan) Koudai Tsukakoshi	6	11	16	9	9	9	16	C	C	3
16	(Japan) Daisuke Nakajima	7	16	14	11	12	11	17	C	C	2
17	(Japan) Tomoki Nojiri	16	13	10	10	8	**14**	12	C	C	2
18	(Japan) Takashi Kogure	15	18	15	13	17	12	14	C	C	0
19	(India) Narain Karthikeyan	13	17	13	14	Ret	Ret	13	C	C	0
Pos	Driver	SUZ	OKA		FUJ	MOT	AUT	SUG	SUZ		Points

Colour	Result
Gold	Winner
Silver	Second place
Bronze	Third place
Green	Points classification
Blue	Non-points classification
Blue	Non-classified finish (NC)
Purple	Retired, not classified (Ret)
Red	Did not qualify (DNQ)
Red	Did not pre-qualify (DNPQ)
Black	Disqualified (DSQ)
White	Did not start (DNS)
White	Withdrew (WD)
White	Race cancelled (C)
Blank	Did not practice (DNP)
Blank	Did not arrive (DNA)
Blank	Excluded (EX)

**Bold** – Pole
Italics – Fastest Lap

=== Teams' Championship ===
Pos	Team	No.	SUZ	OKA		FUJ	MOT	AUT	SUG	SUZ		Points
1	P.mu/cerumo・INGING	1	3	10	9	**Ret**	15	5	4	C	C	47.5
1	P.mu/cerumo・INGING	2	4	8	**2**	1	4	4	6	C	C	47.5
2	Team Mugen	15	10	19	7	5	1	1	2	C	C	43.5
2	Team Mugen	16	2	5	8	Ret	13	Ret	18	C	C	43.5
3	Vantelin Team TOM's	36	5	1	3	3	7	Ret	10	C	C	41
3	Vantelin Team TOM's	37	**1**	9	18	7	11	6	3	C	C	41
4	SUNOCO Team LeMans	7	11	12	4	2	3	2	5	C	C	34.5
4	SUNOCO Team LeMans	8	Ret	15	12	12	10	3	15	C	C	34.5
5	ITOCHU ENEX Team Impul	19	12	**2**	1	4	16	10	1	C	C	27.5
5	ITOCHU ENEX Team Impul	20	18	6	17	8	14	8	17	C	C	27.5
6	KCMG	18	9	4	5	15	2	7	7	C	C	16.5
7	Kondo Racing	3	17	3	11	Ret	5	Ret	**19**	C	C	12.5
7	Kondo Racing	4	14	7	6	Ret	**6**	13	11	C	C	12.5
8	DOCOMO Team Dandelion Racing	40	16	13	10	10	8	**14**	12	C	C	6
8	DOCOMO Team Dandelion Racing	41	8	14	Ret	6	Ret	15	8	C	C	6
9	Real Racing	10	6	11	16	9	9	9	16	C	C	3
10	TCS Nakajima Racing	64	7	16	14	11	12	11	17	C	C	2
10	TCS Nakajima Racing	65	13	17	13	14	Ret	Ret	13	C	C	2
11	B-MAX Racing Team	50	15	18	15	13	17	12	14	C	C	0
Pos	Team	No.	SUZ	OKA		FUJ	MOT	AUT	SUG	SUZ		Points
