= 2027 Super Formula Championship =

Japanese open-wheel motor racing event

The 2027 Japanese Super Formula Championship will be the fifty-fifth season of premier Japanese single-seater motor racing, and the fifteenth under the moniker of Super Formula.

== Teams and drivers ==
All teams will use identical Dallara-built SF23 chassis with either Honda or Toyota engines. Every Honda-powered car will use a Honda HR-417E engine and every Toyota-powered car will use a Toyota TRD-01F engine. All teams will compete with tyres supplied by Yokohama.

Entrant	Engine	No.	Driver name	Rounds	Ref.
(Japan) Triple Tree Racing	Honda	10	(Japan) "Juju"	TBC	

=== Driver changes ===
- Zak O'Sullivan will leave the series after two years to compete for Envision Racing in Formula E.

== Race calendar ==
The provisional calendar was announced on 31 July 2026 by the Japan Automobile Federation. Like in 2026, it will consist of twelve races across five Japanese venues.

Round	Circuit	Location	Date	Support bill	Map of circuit locations
1	Suzuka International Racing Course	Suzuka, Mie	13–14 March	TBA	2027 Super Formula Championship is located in Japan
2	Suzuka International Racing Course	Suzuka, Mie	13–14 March	TBA	2027 Super Formula Championship is located in Japan
3	Mobility Resort Motegi	Motegi, Tochigi	17–18 April	TBA	2027 Super Formula Championship is located in Japan
4	Mobility Resort Motegi	Motegi, Tochigi	17–18 April	TBA	2027 Super Formula Championship is located in Japan
5	Autopolis	Hita, Oita	15–16 May	TBA	2027 Super Formula Championship is located in Japan
6	Sportsland SUGO	Shibata, Miyagi	26–27 June	TBA	2027 Super Formula Championship is located in Japan
7	Fuji Speedway	Oyama, Shizuoka	17–18 July	TBA	2027 Super Formula Championship is located in Japan
8	Fuji Speedway	Oyama, Shizuoka	17–18 July	TBA	2027 Super Formula Championship is located in Japan
9	Fuji Speedway	Oyama, Shizuoka	9–10 October	TBA	2027 Super Formula Championship is located in Japan
10	Fuji Speedway	Oyama, Shizuoka	9–10 October	TBA	2027 Super Formula Championship is located in Japan
11	Suzuka International Racing Course	Suzuka, Mie	27–28 November	TBA	2027 Super Formula Championship is located in Japan
12	Suzuka International Racing Course	Suzuka, Mie	27–28 November	TBA	2027 Super Formula Championship is located in Japan

=== Calendar changes ===
- Suzuka will return to hosting the season opener, with Motegi running rounds two and three in April.
- The round at Sportsland SUGO will move from August to June, resulting in two successive rounds at Fuji Speedway with a 3-month gap in between.
