= 2019 Super Formula Championship =

Japanese motorsports event

The 2019 Japanese Super Formula Championship was the forty-seventh season of premier Japanese open-wheel motor racing, and the seventh under the moniker of Super Formula. The season began on 21 April at Suzuka Circuit and ended on 27 October at the same location.

2019 marked the first season of the Dallara SF19 chassis package, while continuing the engine configuration of the preceding chassis.

Nick Cassidy clinched his first Driver's Championship title, after finishing ahead of reigning champion Naoki Yamamoto at the season finale at Suzuka. Docomo Team Dandelion Racing won their first Teams' Championship title since 2012, with Naoki Yamamoto and Nirei Fukuzumi driving for them.

== Teams and drivers ==
Every Honda-powered car used a Honda HR-414E engine and every Toyota-powered car used a Toyota RI4A engine.

Team	Engine	No.	Driver	Rounds
(Japan) Docomo Team Dandelion Racing	Honda	1	(Japan) Naoki Yamamoto	All
(Japan) Docomo Team Dandelion Racing	Honda	5	(Japan) Nirei Fukuzumi	All
(Japan) Kondo Racing	Toyota	3	(Japan) Kenta Yamashita	All
(Japan) Kondo Racing	Toyota	4	(Japan) Yuji Kunimoto	All
(Japan) UOMO Sunoco Team LeMans	Toyota	7	(Russia) Artem Markelov	1–5
(Japan) UOMO Sunoco Team LeMans	Toyota	7	(Japan) Yuichi Nakayama	6–7
(Japan) UOMO Sunoco Team LeMans	Toyota	8	(Japan) Kazuya Oshima	All
(Japan) Team Mugen	Honda	15	(United Kingdom) Dan Ticktum	1–3
(Japan) Team Mugen	Honda	15	(Mexico) Patricio O'Ward	4–6
(Japan) Team Mugen	Honda	15	(Estonia) Jüri Vips	7
(Japan) Team Mugen	Honda	16	(Japan) Tomoki Nojiri	All
(Japan) Real Racing	Honda	17	(France) Tristan Charpentier	1
(Japan) Real Racing	Honda	17	(Japan) Koudai Tsukakoshi	2–7
(Hong Kong) carrozzeria Team KCMG	Toyota	18	(Japan) Kamui Kobayashi	All
(Japan) Itochu Enex Team Impul	Toyota	19	(Japan) Yuhi Sekiguchi	All
(Japan) Itochu Enex Team Impul	Toyota	20	(Japan) Ryo Hirakawa	All
(Japan) Vantelin Team TOM'S	Toyota	36	(Japan) Kazuki Nakajima	All
(Japan) Vantelin Team TOM'S	Toyota	37	(New Zealand) Nick Cassidy	All
(Japan) JMS P.mu/cerumo・INGING	Toyota	38	(Japan) Hiroaki Ishiura	All
(Japan) JMS P.mu/cerumo・INGING	Toyota	39	(Japan) Sho Tsuboi	All
(Japan) B-Max Racing with Motopark	Honda	50	(Austria) Lucas Auer	All
(Japan) B-Max Racing with Motopark	Honda	51	(United Kingdom) Harrison Newey	All
(Japan) TCS Nakajima Racing	Honda	64	(Spain) Álex Palou	All
(Japan) TCS Nakajima Racing	Honda	65	(Japan) Tadasuke Makino	All

=== Team changes ===
- German team Motopark will enter the championship in collaboration with the B-MAX Racing Team.

=== Driver changes ===
- Lucas Auer announce to joining Super Formula with B-MAX Motopark after Mercedes AMG shut down their DTM project. Former FIA European Formula Three Championship driver Harrison Newey was later confirmed in a second B-MAX car.
- 2018 champion Naoki Yamamoto moves to Team Dandelion Racing after eight seasons driving for Team Mugen. He is joined by Nirei Fukuzumi, who completed a partial season with Mugen in 2018 alongside FIA Formula 2. Nobuharu Matsushita leaves Team Dandelion after a single season, returning to Formula 2 with Carlin.
- Tomoki Nojiri moves from Team Dandelion to Team Mugen. He will be partnered by 2018 FIA Formula 3 European Championship runner-up and two-time Macau Grand Prix winner Daniel Ticktum, who competed in two rounds for the team in 2018.
- Koudai Tsukakoshi leaves Real Racing's Super Formula team after six seasons. He is replaced by Tristan Charpentier, who raced in the BRDC British Formula 3 Championship in 2018.
- Narain Karthikeyan and Takuya Izawa are replaced at Nakajima Racing by Formula 2 race winner Tadasuke Makino and former European and Japanese Formula Three driver Álex Palou. Karthikeyan will remain with the team in Super GT.
- 2018 series runner-up Nick Cassidy will move from Kondō Racing to Team TOM'S, replacing James Rossiter.
- 2016 champion Yuji Kunimoto will take Cassidy's place at Kondo Racing, after Toyota promoted 2018 Japanese F3 champion Sho Tsuboi to his former seat at Cerumo・INGING.
- Artem Markelov, a five-season veteran of the GP2 Series and FIA Formula 2 with Russian Time, joins Super Formula in the #7 Team LeMans, which in 2018 was driven by both Pietro Fittipaldi and Tom Dillmann.

==== Mid-season changes ====
- Tristan Charpentier left Real Racing after the first round. He had qualified two seconds off the pace in the first round and crashed heavily in the race. He was replaced by veteran racer Koudai Tsukakoshi for the rest of the season.
- Dan Ticktum left Team Mugen after the third round. He was dropped by the Red Bull Junior programme and subsequently lost his Super Formula drive. He was replaced by new Red Bull Junior, Patricio O'Ward for the remainder of the season. However, O'Ward was dropped prior to the final round from the Red Bull Junior Team and thus for the final round, the seat was filled by Estonian Jüri Vips.
- Yuichi Nakayama replaced Artem Markelov at the sixth round due to Markelov being called up to race for BWT Arden in the FIA Formula 2 Championship

== Race calendar and results ==
The calendar with seven rounds was announced in August 2018.

Round	Circuit	Date	Pole position	Fastest lap	Winning driver	Winning team
1	Suzuka Circuit	21 April	(Japan) Tadasuke Makino	(Spain) Álex Palou	(New Zealand) Nick Cassidy	Vantelin Team TOM'S
2	Autopolis	19 May	(Japan) Yuji Kunimoto	(Japan) Yuhi Sekiguchi	(Japan) Yuhi Sekiguchi	Itochu Enex Team Impul
3	Sportsland Sugo	23 June	(Japan) Naoki Yamamoto	(Austria) Lucas Auer	(Japan) Naoki Yamamoto	Docomo Team Dandelion Racing
4	Fuji Speedway	14 July	(Spain) Álex Palou	(Spain) Álex Palou	(Spain) Álex Palou	TCS Nakajima Racing
5	Twin Ring Motegi	18 August	(Spain) Álex Palou	(Russia) Artem Markelov	(Japan) Ryo Hirakawa	Itochu Enex Team Impul
6	Okayama International Circuit	29 September	(Japan) Ryo Hirakawa	(Japan) Kamui Kobayashi	(Japan) Kenta Yamashita	Kondo Racing
7	Suzuka Circuit	27 October	(Spain) Álex Palou	(New Zealand) Nick Cassidy	(Japan) Tomoki Nojiri	Team Mugen

== Championship standings ==
=== Drivers' Championship ===
Scoring system

Position	1	2	3	4	5	6	7	8	**Pole**
Rounds 1-6	10	8	6	5	4	3	2	1	1
Round 7	13	8	6	5	4	3	2	1	1

Driver standings

Pos	Driver	SUZ	AUT	SUG	FUJ	MOT	OKA	SUZ	Points
1	(New Zealand) Nick Cassidy	1	8	4	3	3	10	2	36
2	(Japan) Naoki Yamamoto	2	2	**1**	11	9	7	5	33
3	(Spain) Álex Palou	Ret	6	13	**1**	**4**	4	**19**	26
4	(Japan) Tomoki Nojiri	4	18	Ret	4	8	9	1	24
5	(Japan) Kenta Yamashita	3	7	6	17	13	1	9	21
6	(Japan) Kamui Kobayashi	9	10	2	6	2	18	12	19
7	(Japan) Nirei Fukuzumi	11	5	5	9	5	Ret	3	18
8	(Japan) Yuhi Sekiguchi	Ret	1	10	8	15	13	4	16
9	(Austria) Lucas Auer	7	11	3	Ret	7	5	11	14
10	(Japan) Ryo Hirakawa	Ret	14	11	12	1	**12**	8	12
11	(Japan) Sho Tsuboi	5	12	Ret	2	17	11	10	12
12	(Japan) Kazuki Nakajima	Ret	13	12	5	16	2	14	12
13	(Japan) Hiroaki Ishiura	Ret	9	7	7	6	Ret	6	10
14	(Japan) Kazuya Oshima	12	3	17	13	11	8	17	7
15	(United Kingdom) Harrison Newey	Ret	17	Ret	16	19	3	20	6
16	(Japan) Tadasuke Makino	**Ret**	4	14	10	Ret	17	13	6
17	(Japan) Yuji Kunimoto	6	**16**	8	15	10	16	15	5
18	(Mexico) Patricio O'Ward				14	14	6		3
19	(Japan) Koudai Tsukakoshi		15	9	18	18	14	7	2
20	(United Kingdom) Dan Ticktum	8	Ret	15					1
21	(Russia) Artem Markelov	10	Ret	16	19	12			0
22	(Japan) Yuichi Nakayama						15	16	0
23	(Estonia) Jüri Vips							18	0
24	(France) Tristan Charpentier	Ret							0
Pos	Driver	SUZ	AUT	SUG	FUJ	MOT	OKA	SUZ	Points

Colour	Result
Gold	Winner
Silver	Second place
Bronze	Third place
Green	Points classification
Blue	Non-points classification
Blue	Non-classified finish (NC)
Purple	Retired, not classified (Ret)
Red	Did not qualify (DNQ)
Red	Did not pre-qualify (DNPQ)
Black	Disqualified (DSQ)
White	Did not start (DNS)
White	Withdrew (WD)
White	Race cancelled (C)
Blank	Did not practice (DNP)
Blank	Did not arrive (DNA)
Blank	Excluded (EX)

**Bold** – Pole
Italics – Fastest Lap

=== Teams' Championship ===
Pos	Team	No.	SUZ	AUT	SUG	FUJ	MOT	OKA	SUZ	Points
1	Docomo Team Dandelion Racing	1	2	2	**1**	11	9	5	5	50
1	Docomo Team Dandelion Racing	5	11	5	5	9	5	Ret	3	50
2	Vantelin Team TOM'S	36	Ret	13	12	5	16	2	14	48
2	Vantelin Team TOM'S	37	1	8	4	3	3	10	2	48
3	TCS Nakajima Racing	64	Ret	6	13	**1**	**4**	4	**19**	28
3	TCS Nakajima Racing	65	**Ret**	4	14	10	Ret	17	13	28
4	Itochu Enex Team Impul	19	Ret	1	10	8	15	13	4	27
4	Itochu Enex Team Impul	20	Ret	14	11	12	1	**12**	8	27
5	Team Mugen	15	8	Ret	15	14	14	6	18	25
5	Team Mugen	16	4	18	Ret	4	8	9	1	25
6	Kondo Racing	3	3	7	6	17	13	1	9	25
6	Kondo Racing	4	6	**16**	8	15	10	16	15	25
7	JMS P.mu/Cerumo・INGING	38	Ret	9	7	7	6	Ret	6	22
7	JMS P.mu/Cerumo・INGING	39	5	12	Ret	2	17	11	10	22
8	B-MAX Racing with Motopark	50	7	11	3	Ret	7	5	11	20
8	B-MAX Racing with Motopark	51	Ret	17	Ret	16	19	3	20	20
9	carrozzeria Team KCMG	18	9	10	2	6	2	18	12	19
10	UOMO Sunoco Team LeMans	7	10	Ret	16	19	12	15	16	7
10	UOMO Sunoco Team LeMans	8	12	3	17	13	11	8	17	7
11	Real Racing	17	Ret	15	9	18	18	14	7	2
Pos	Team	No.	SUZ	AUT	SUG	FUJ	MOT	OKA	SUZ	Points
