= 2018 Super Formula Championship =

Formula racing championship

The 2018 Japanese Super Formula Championship was the forty-sixth season of premier Japanese open-wheel motor racing, and the sixth under the moniker of Super Formula. The season began on 22 April and is scheduled to end on 28 October at the same place after seven rounds.

2018 was the final season that the Dallara SF14 chassis package—which débuted in the 2014 Super Formula Championship—was used in competition; as a brand new chassis package will be introduced for the 2019 season but the engine configuration will remain the same.

== Teams and drivers ==
Every Honda-powered car used a Honda HR-414E engine and every Toyota-powered car used a Toyota RI4A engine.

Team	Engine	No.	Driver	Rounds
(Japan) JMS P.mu/cerumo・INGING	Toyota	1	(Japan) Hiroaki Ishiura	All
(Japan) JMS P.mu/cerumo・INGING	Toyota	2	(Japan) Yuji Kunimoto	All
(Japan) Kondo Racing	Toyota	3	(New Zealand) Nick Cassidy	All
(Japan) Kondo Racing	Toyota	4	(Japan) Kenta Yamashita	All
(Japan) Docomo Team Dandelion Racing	Honda	5	(Japan) Tomoki Nojiri	All
(Japan) Docomo Team Dandelion Racing	Honda	6	(Japan) Nobuharu Matsushita	All
(Japan) UOMO Sunoco Team LeMans	Toyota	7	(Brazil) Pietro Fittipaldi	1
(Japan) UOMO Sunoco Team LeMans	Toyota	7	(France) Tom Dillmann	2–7
(Japan) UOMO Sunoco Team LeMans	Toyota	8	(Japan) Kazuya Oshima	All
(Japan) Team Mugen	Honda	15	(Japan) Nirei Fukuzumi	1, 5–7
(Japan) Team Mugen	Honda	15	(Japan) Sena Sakaguchi	2
(Japan) Team Mugen	Honda	15	(United Kingdom) Dan Ticktum	3–4
(Japan) Team Mugen	Honda	16	(Japan) Naoki Yamamoto	All
(Japan) REAL Racing	Honda	17	(Japan) Koudai Tsukakoshi	All
(Hong Kong) carrozzeria Team KCMG	Toyota	18	(Japan) Kamui Kobayashi	1–4, 6–7
(Hong Kong) carrozzeria Team KCMG	Toyota	18	(Japan) Yuichi Nakayama	5
(Japan) Itochu Enex Team Impul	Toyota	19	(Japan) Yuhi Sekiguchi	All
(Japan) Itochu Enex Team Impul	Toyota	20	(Japan) Ryo Hirakawa	All
(Japan) Vantelin Team Tom's	Toyota	36	(Japan) Kazuki Nakajima	1–4, 6–7
(Japan) Vantelin Team Tom's	Toyota	36	(Brazil) João Paulo de Oliveira	5
(Japan) Vantelin Team Tom's	Toyota	37	(United Kingdom) James Rossiter	All
(Japan) B-MAX Racing Team	Honda	50	(Japan) Katsumasa Chiyo	All
(Japan) TCS Nakajima Racing	Honda	64	(India) Narain Karthikeyan	All
(Japan) TCS Nakajima Racing	Honda	65	(Japan) Takuya Izawa	All

=== Driver changes ===
- Nissan Super GT driver Katsumasa Chiyo replaced Takashi Kogure in the B-MAX Racing Team.
- 2017 World Series Formula V8 3.5 champion Pietro Fittipaldi replaced Felix Rosenqvist in the Team LeMans. Tom Dillmann is scheduled to substitute Fittipaldi at the Autopolis and Sugo rounds, who will be busy due to his 2018 IndyCar Series commitments. After Fittipaldi was injured at the 6 Hours of Spa-Francorchamps, Dillman replaced Fittipaldi for more rounds.
- Pierre Gasly left the series to compete in Formula One with Scuderia Toro Rosso. His place at Team Mugen was taken by Nirei Fukuzumi, who finished third in the 2017 GP3 Series. Fukuzumi will also compete in the FIA Formula 2 Championship, and is set to prioritise F2 rounds over Super Formula where any dates clash.
- André Lotterer left the TOM'S team and the championship after fifteen consecutive seasons since 2003. His seat was taken by James Rossiter, formerly of Kondo Racing who returns after a season out.
- Nobuharu Matsushita returned to Japan after two seasons in the GP2 Series and one season in the FIA Formula 2 Championship, joining Docomo Team Dandelion Racing. He takes the seat of Takuya Izawa, who moved to Nakajima Racing.
- Ryo Hirakawa returned to Super Formula for the first time since 2015 with Team Impul, replacing Jann Mardenborough.

== Race calendar and results ==
Due to scheduling restrictions imposed by the concurrent Japan WTCR round, the final round of the calendar at Suzuka Circuit will now feature a single race instead of the originally planned double-header.

Round	Circuit	Date	Pole position	Fastest lap	Winning driver	Winning team
1	Suzuka Circuit	22 April	(Japan) Naoki Yamamoto	(United Kingdom) James Rossiter	(Japan) Naoki Yamamoto	Team Mugen
2	Autopolis	13 May	(Japan) Ryo Hirakawa	Race cancelled due to weather conditions		
3	Sportsland SUGO	27 May	(Japan) Tomoki Nojiri	(Japan) Yuhi Sekiguchi	(Japan) Naoki Yamamoto	Team Mugen
4	Fuji Speedway	8 July	(New Zealand) Nick Cassidy	(New Zealand) Nick Cassidy	(New Zealand) Nick Cassidy	Kondo Racing
5	Twin Ring Motegi	19 August	(Japan) Hiroaki Ishiura	(Japan) Nirei Fukuzumi	(Japan) Hiroaki Ishiura	JMS P.mu/Cerumo・INGING
6	Okayama International Circuit	9 September	(Japan) Yuhi Sekiguchi	(Japan) Kamui Kobayashi	(Japan) Yuhi Sekiguchi	Itochu Enex Team Impul
7	Suzuka Circuit	27 October	(Japan) Naoki Yamamoto	(Japan) Yuhi Sekiguchi	(Japan) Naoki Yamamoto	Team Mugen

== Championship standings ==
=== Drivers' Championship ===
Scoring system

Position	1	2	3	4	5	6	7	8	Pole
Rounds 1-6	10	8	6	5	4	3	2	1	1
Round 7 (Note: Three extra points awarded to the winner of the season finale at Suzuka.)	13	8	6	5	4	3	2	1	1

Driver standings

Pos	Driver	SUZ	AUT	SUG	FUJ	MOT	OKA (Note: The race was red flagged after completing 34 laps. Due to less than 75% of the scheduled distance being completed, half points were awarded to the classified finishers.)	SUZ	Points
1	(Japan) Naoki Yamamoto	1	C	1	8	7	10	1	38
2	(New Zealand) Nick Cassidy	7	C	2	1	3	5	2	37
3	(Japan) Hiroaki Ishiura	4	C	11	2	1	7	11	25
4	(Japan) Yuhi Sekiguchi	2	C	13	6	16	1	8	18
5	(Japan) Ryo Hirakawa	Ret	C	9	4	2	3	Ret	17
6	(Japan) Kazuki Nakajima	8	C	3	5		17	5	15
7	(Japan) Tomoki Nojiri	3	C	7	14	8	4	9	12.5
8	(Japan) Yuji Kunimoto	13	C	Ret	3	15	8	4	11.5
9	(Japan) Kenta Yamashita	9	C	8	18	6	6	3	11.5
10	(Japan) Kamui Kobayashi	10	C	6	12		2	13	7
11	(Japan) Nobuharu Matsushita	12	C	10	9	4	9	7	7
12	(Japan) Kazuya Oshima	15	C	15	7	5	16	14	6
13	(Japan) Koudai Tsukakoshi	6	C	12	13	10	12	6	6
14	(France) Tom Dillmann		C	4	10	12	Ret	15	5
15	(India) Narain Karthikeyan	17	C	5	16	11	13	17	4
16	(Japan) Takuya Izawa	5	C	14	15	14	14	16	4
17	(United Kingdom) James Rossiter	11	C	Ret	19	9	11	Ret	0
18	(Japan) Katsumasa Chiyo	14	C	Ret	17	19	15	10	0
19	(United Kingdom) Dan Ticktum			Ret	11				0
20	(Japan) Nirei Fukuzumi	Ret				17	18	12	0
21	(Japan) Yuichi Nakayama					13			0
22	(Brazil) Pietro Fittipaldi	16							0
23	(Brazil) João Paulo de Oliveira					18			0
—	(Japan) Sena Sakaguchi		C						—
Pos	Driver	SUZ	AUT	SUG	FUJ	MOT	OKA	SUZ	Points

=== Teams' Championship ===
Pos	Team	No.	SUZ	AUT	SUG	FUJ	MOT	OKA	SUZ	Points
1	Kondo Racing	3	7	C	2	1	3	5	2	47.5
1	Kondo Racing	4	9	C	8	18	6	6	3	47.5
2	Team Mugen	15	Ret	C	Ret	11	17	18	12	36
2	Team Mugen	16	1	C	1	8	7	10	1	36
3	P.mu/Cerumo・INGING	1	4	C	11	2	1	7	11	35.5
3	P.mu/Cerumo・INGING	2	13	C	Ret	3	15	8	4	35.5
4	Itochu Enex Team Impul	19	2	C	13	6	16	1	8	33
4	Itochu Enex Team Impul	20	Ret	C	9	4	2	3	Ret	33
5	Docomo Team Dandelion Racing	5	3	C	7	14	8	4	9	18.5
5	Docomo Team Dandelion Racing	6	12	C	10	9	4	9	7	18.5
6	Vantelin Team Tom's	36	8	C	3	5	18	17	5	15
6	Vantelin Team Tom's	37	11	C	Ret	19	9	11	Ret	15
7	UOMO Sunoco Team LeMans	7	16	C	4	10	12	Ret	15	11
7	UOMO Sunoco Team LeMans	8	15	C	15	7	5	16	14	11
8	TCS Nakajima Racing	64	17	C	5	16	11	13	17	8
8	TCS Nakajima Racing	65	5	C	14	15	14	14	16	8
9	carrozzeria Team KCMG	18	10	C	6	12	13	2	13	7
10	REAL Racing	17	6	C	12	13	10	12	6	6
11	B-MAX Racing Team	50	14	C	Ret	17	19	15	10	0
Pos	Team	No.	SUZ	AUT	SUG	FUJ	MOT	OKA	SUZ	Points
