= Tadasuke Makino =

Japanese racing driver (born 1997)

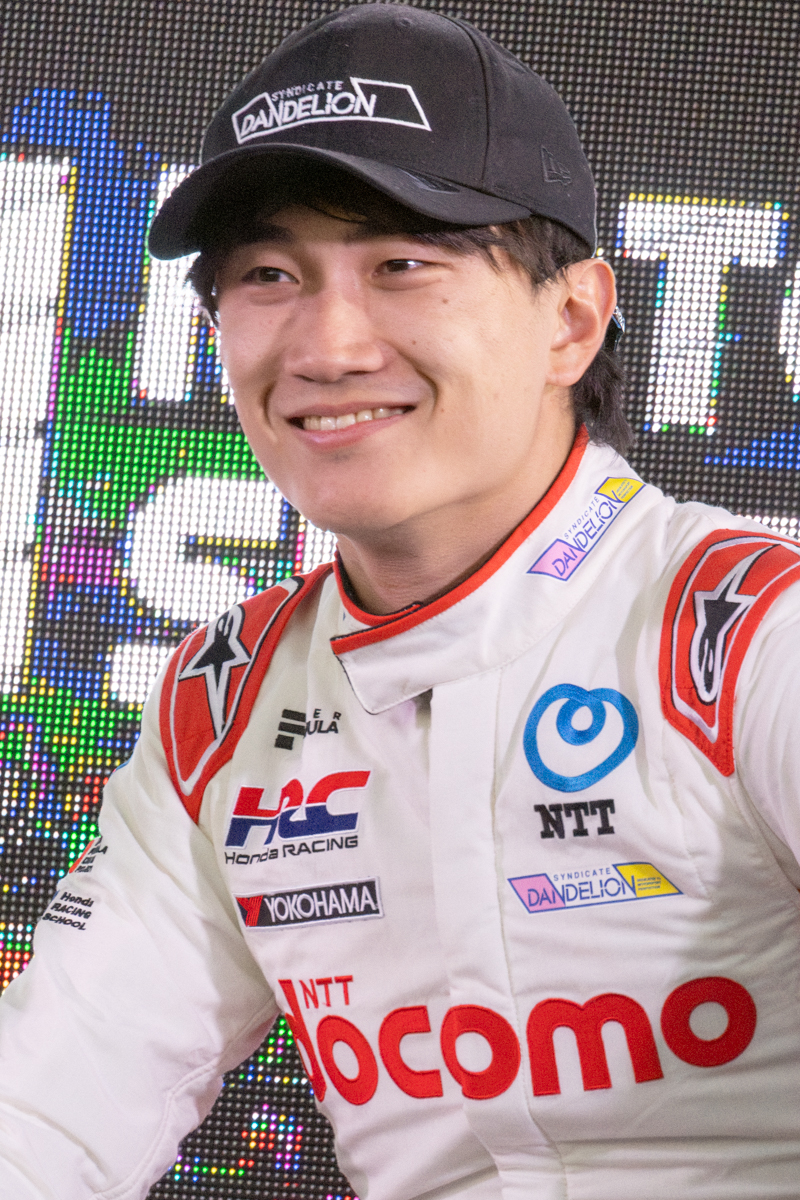
- Makino in 2024
- Nationality: (Japan) Japanese
- Born: 28 June 1997 (age 29) Osaka, Japan

Super GT - GT500 career
- Debut season: 2016
- Current team: Team Kunimitsu
- Categorisation: FIA Gold
- Car number: 100
- Former teams: Drago Corse, Nakajima Racing
- Starts: 66
- Wins: 7
- Podiums: 20
- Poles: 4
- Fastest laps: 2
- Best finish: 1st in 2020, 2026

Super Formula career
- Debut season: 2019
- Current team: Docomo Team Dandelion Racing
- Car number: 5
- Former teams: Nakajima Racing
- Starts: 67
- Wins: 4
- Podiums: 19
- Poles: 4
- Fastest laps: 1
- Best finish: 3rd in 2024

Previous series
- 2018 2017 2016 2015: FIA Formula 2 Championship; FIA European F3; All-Japan F3 Championship; F4 Japanese Championship

Championship titles
- 2020, 2026: Super GT

Tadasuke Makino (牧野任祐, Makino Tadasuke; born 28 June 1997) is a Japanese racing driver for Honda Motor Company who currently competes in Super GT for Team Kunimitsu and in the Super Formula Championship for Dandelion Racing. A feature race winner in the FIA Formula 2 Championship during his time abroad in junior categories, Makino has competed in the top level of Japan's domestic racing scene since 2019. Alongside teammate Naoki Yamamoto, he won the GT500 class championship in Super GT in 2020 and 2026.

== Career ==
=== Early career ===
Makino started karting in 2004 at the Kansai Kartland circuit in Sakai and made his race debut the following year. He remained in karting until 2013, winning the All-Japan Karting Championship's FS-125 class in 2011 and making his international karting debut during the same year.

In 2014, Makino stepped up to formula racing, entering the Okayama series of the entry-level Super FJ category as well as select races in JAF Formula 4. He would go on to dominate Super FJ and JAF F4 for the next two years, winning all but one race he competed in against the likes of Yūki Nemoto and Shunsuke Kohno.

=== Formula 4 ===
In 2015, Makino made the move to Japan's new official Formula 4 Championship, and raced for the Rn-sports team. He won four of the championship's first five races at the Okayama International Circuit and Fuji Speedway (both two wins) straight away, but then had to wait until the final race weekend at Twin Ring Motegi to add two more wins to his name. At the end of the season, he finished second with 192 points, just three points fewer than eventual champion Sho Tsuboi.

=== Formula 3 ===
In 2016, Makino made his Formula 3 debut in the Japanese Formula 3 Championship as a driver from Honda's training program. In this he raced for the TODA Racing team. He took four podiums and was fifth in the championship with 41 points. At the end of the season, he competed in three races of the Super GT for Drago Modulo Honda Racing GT500, taking one podium finish alongside Hideki Mutoh at the Chang International Circuit. He also drove for Toda Racing in the Grand Prix of Macau, in which he finished fourteenth.

In 2017 Makino continued to drive in Formula 3, but made the switch to the European Formula 3 Championship as a driver for Hitech GP. He had a difficult start to the season, scoring only twice in the first half of the year before breaking his wrist and finger in an accident with Harrison Newey at the Norisring. Despite his injury, he only missed the race weekend at Spa-Francorchamps. After his return, he regularly finished in the top-ten with a podium finish at the Red Bull Ring as the highlight. In the end, he finished fifteenth in the final standings with 57 points.`

=== Formula 2 ===
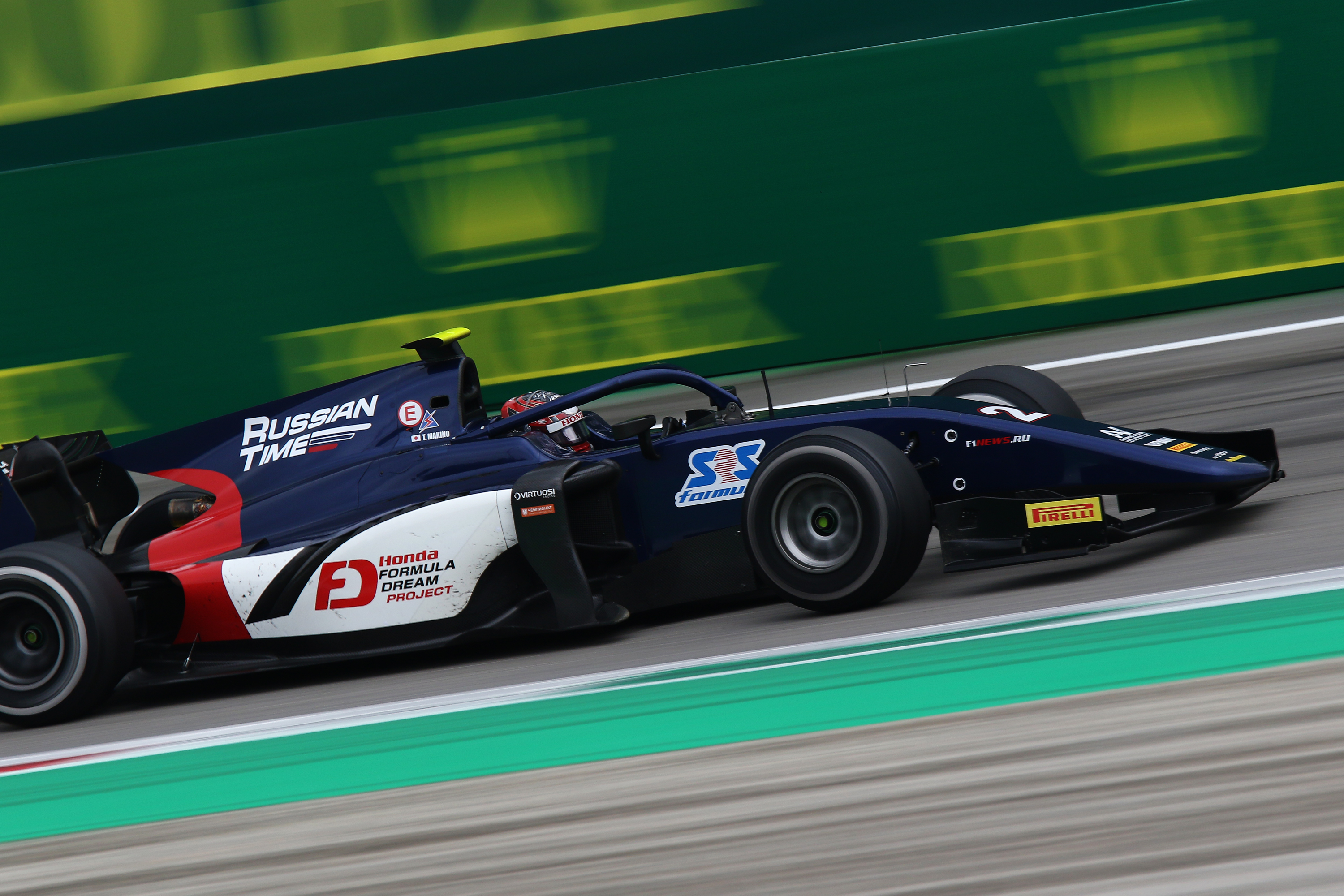
Makino at the 2018 Monza Formula 2 round

In 2018, Makino made his Formula 2 debut with the Russian Time team. He scored points regularly until he surprisingly won the feature race at the Monza in the second half of the season thanks to good strategy. He finished thirteenth in the standings with 48 points.

=== Super Formula ===
In 2019, Makino returned to Japan to participate in the Super Formula for the team Nakajima Racing. In the end of 2020, Makino suffered from meningitis and thus skipped the Super Formula finale, where he was replaced by Hiroki Otsu. For the 2021 season, Makino moved from Nakajima Racing to Dandelion Racing. But he did not enter the first two rounds, due to still being in healing phase, which meant Ukyo Sasahara covered for him in those races. Makino returned at the third round in Autopolis. Makino then stayed with the same team till now and he grabbed couple of podiums every year.

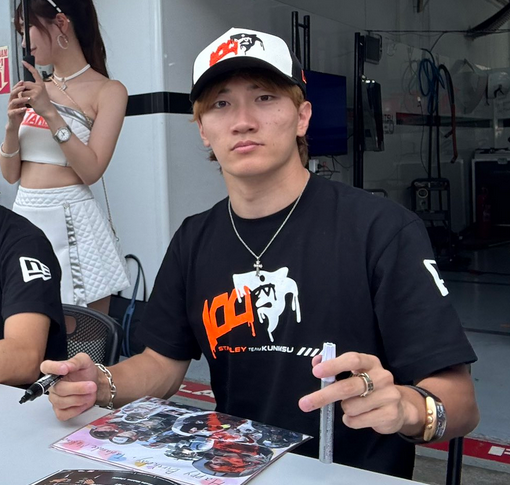
Makino at the 2025 Super GT Malaysia Festival

=== Super GT ===
In 2019, Makino stepped up to Super GT GT500 along with his Super Formula program. He competed with Nakajima Racing alongside Narain Karthikeyan. The next season he replaced Jenson Button as he competed with Team Kunimitsu alongside former GT500 title winner Naoki Yamamoto. Both Yamamoto and Makino won the Super GT title, beating Ryo Hirakawa in the last race. Makino continued racing with the team for the next couple of seasons, but had to skip one round due to illness in 2021 and was covered by Hideki Mutoh.

== Karting record ==
=== Karting career summary ===
Season	Series	Team	Position
2006	SL Osaka Series - Comer		2nd
2006	M4 All-Japan Championship - Cadets		1st
2007	SL Biwako Series - Yamaha Junior		1st
2007	SL Osaka Series - Yamaha Junior		1st
2007	M4 WEST Series - Cadets		1st
2008	SL All-Japan Kart Meeting - TIA Junior		1st
2010	JAF Junior Karting Championship - FP-Jr	Akiland R	5th
2011	All-Japan Karting Championship - FS-125	Akiland Racing	1st
2011	Rotax Max Euro Challenge — Junior	Intrepid Force Rotax	31st
2011	Rotax Max Challenge Grand Finals — Junior	EIKO Japan	29th
2011	WSK Final Cup — KF3	Tony Kart Racing Team	14th
2012	All-Japan Karting Championship - KF1	TOYOTA/YAMAHA RT	4th
2012	Rotax International Open — Senior		33rd
2012	IAME International Final — X30 Senior		18th
2012	Rotax Max Euro Challenge — Senior		19th
2012	CIK-FIA Asia Pacific Championship — KF2		25th
2013	All-Japan Karting Championship - KF1	TOYOTA/YAMAHA RT	6th
2013	Florida Winter Tour — Rotax Senior		5th
2013	CIK-FIA Asia Pacific Championship — KF	TAKAGI PLANNING	19th
2014	All-Japan Karting Championship - KF	ADVAN HIROTEX RACING	26th

== Racing record ==
=== Racing career summary ===
Season	Series	Team	Races	Wins	Poles	FLaps	Podiums	Points	Position
2014	Super FJ Okayama Series	Rn-sports	5	5	5	5	5	100	**1st**
2014	Super FJ - All-Japan Masters Race	Rn-sports	1	1	1	1	1	N/A	**1st**
2014	JAF Formula 4 - West Series	Marusan MYST/Rn-sports	2	1	2	2	1	22	9th
2015	F4 Japanese Championship	Rn-sports	14	6	4	3	11	192	**2nd**
2015	JAF Formula 4 - East Series	Rn-sports/MYST	4	4	4	3	4	80	**1st**
2015	JAF Formula 4 - West Series	Rn-sports/MYST	5	5	5	5	5	100	**1st**
2015	JAF F4 - All-Japan Final	Rn-sports/MYST	1	1	1	1	1	N/A	**1st**
2016	Japanese Formula 3 Championship	Toda Racing	17	0	1	0	4	41	5th
2016	Macau Grand Prix	Toda Racing	1	0	0	0	0	N/A	14th
2016	Super GT - GT500	Drago Modulo Honda Racing	3	0	0	0	1	15	16th
2016	Super GT - GT300	Cars Tokai Dream28	1	0	0	0	0	0	NC
2017	FIA Formula 3 European Championship	Hitech GP	27	0	0	0	1	57	15th
2017	Macau Grand Prix	Motopark	1	0	0	0	0	N/A	9th
2018	FIA Formula 2 Championship	Russian Time	24	1	0	0	1	48	13th
2019	Super GT - GT500	Modulo Nakajima Racing	8	0	0	0	1	23.5	12th
2019	Super Formula	TCS Nakajima Racing	7	0	1	0	0	6	16th
2019	Intercontinental GT Challenge	Honda Team Motul	1	0	0	0	0	0	NC
2020	Super GT - GT500	Team Kunimitsu	8	1	0	0	3	69	**1st**
2020	Super Formula	TCS Nakajima Racing	6	0	0	0	1	20	12th
2021	Super GT - GT500	Team Kunimitsu	7	1	1	0	2	57	4th
2021	Super Formula	Docomo Team Dandelion Racing	5	0	0	0	1	24	9th
2022	Super GT - GT500	Team Kunimitsu	8	1	1	1	3	62	**3rd**
2022	Super Formula	Docomo Team Dandelion Racing	10	0	0	0	2	61	5th
2023	Super GT - GT500	Team Kunimitsu	8	0	1	1	1	34	10th
2023	Super Formula	Docomo Team Dandelion Racing	9	0	1	0	2	43	6th
2023	Super Taikyu - ST-Z	Techno First	2	0	0	0	0	99‡	**3rd‡**
2024	Super GT - GT500	Stanley Team Kunimitsu	8	0	0	0	2	64	**2nd**
2024	Super Formula	Docomo Team Dandelion Racing	9	2	0	0	4	86	**3rd**
2025	Super GT - GT500	Stanley Team Kunimitsu	8	1	0	0	3	63	**2nd**
2025	Super Formula	Docomo Team Dandelion Racing	12	2	2	0	5	113	4th
2026	Super GT - GT500	Stanley Team Kunimitsu	8	3	1	0	4	85	**1st**
2026	Super Formula	Docomo Team Dandelion Racing	12	0	0	1	2	60	6th
2026	Super Taikyu - ST-Z	Techno First							
2026-27	Asian Le Mans Series - GT3	Ponos Racing	2	0	0	0	0	0	26th*

^{*} Season still in progress.

‡ Team standings

=== Complete F4 Japanese Championship results ===
(key) (Races in bold indicate pole position) (Races in italics indicate fastest lap)

Year	Team	1	2	3	4	5	6	7	8	9	10	11	12	13	14	DC	Points
2015	Honda Formula Dream Project	OKA; 1; 1	OKA; 2; 1	**FUJ**; **1**; 2	**FUJ**; **2**; 1	FUJ; 1; 1	FUJ; 2; 26	SUZ; 1; 2	**SUZ**; **2**; 2	SUG; 1; 2	SUG; 2; 3	AUT; 1; 9	AUT; 2; 5	MOT; 1; 1	**MOT**; **2**; 1	2nd	192

=== Complete Japanese Formula 3 Championship results ===
(key) (Races in bold indicate pole position) (Races in italics indicate fastest lap)

Year	Entrant	1	2	3	4	5	6	7	8	9	10	11	12	13	14	15	16	17	Pos	Points
2016	Toda Racing	SUZ; 1; 8	SUZ; 2; 6	FUJ; 1; 6	FUJ; 2; 6	OKA; 1 Ret	OKA; 1; 2	SUZ; 1; 4	SUZ; 2; 6	FUJ; 1; 3	FUJ; 2; 5	**MOT**; **1**; 2	MOT; 2; 5	OKA; 1; 5	OKA; 2; 3	SUG; 1; 4	SUG; 2; 9	SUG; 3; 7	5th	41

=== Complete Super GT results ===
(key) (Races in bold indicate pole position) (Races in italics indicate fastest lap)

Year	Team	Car	Class	1	2	3	4	5	6	7	8	9	DC	Points
2016	Cars Tokai Dream28	Lotus Evora MC	GT300	OKA	FUJ	SUG	FUJ	SUZ; Ret					NC	0
2016	Drago Modulo Honda Racing	Honda NSX Concept-GT	GT500						CHA; 2	MOT; 12	MOT; 15		16th	15
2019	Modulo Nakajima Racing	Honda NSX-GT	GT500	OKA; 10	FUJ; 10	SUZ; 11	CHA; 10	FUJ; 10	AUT; 7	SUG; 2	MOT; 12		12th	23.5
2020	Team Kunimitsu	Honda NSX-GT	GT500	FUJ; 6	FUJ; 5	SUZ; 2	MOT; 5	FUJ; 5	SUZ; Ret	MOT; 3	FUJ; 1		1st	69
2021	Team Kunimitsu	Honda NSX-GT	GT500	OKA	FUJ; 4	**MOT**; 1	SUZ; 4	SUG; 2	AUT; 6	MOT; 12	FUJ; 14		4th	57
2022	Team Kunimitsu	Honda NSX-GT	GT500	OKA; 2	FUJ; 5‡	SUZ; 9	FUJ; 8	SUZ; 11	SUG; 8	AUT; 2	**MOT**; 1		3rd	62
2023	Team Kunimitsu	Honda NSX-GT	GT500	OKA; 12	**FUJ**; 2	SUZ; 5	FUJ; 6	SUZ; 7	SUG; Ret	AUT; 9	MOT; 10		10th	34
2024	Stanley Team Kunimitsu	Honda Civic Type R-GT GT500	GT500	OKA; 3	FUJ; 7	SUZ; 7	FUJ; 2	SUG; 5	AUT; 4	MOT; 6	SUZ; 4		2nd	64
2025	Stanley Team Kunimitsu	Honda Civic Type R-GT GT500	GT500	OKA; 4	FUJ; 3	SEP; 6	FS1; 7	FS2 (12)	SUZ; 10	SUG; 6	AUT; 1	MOT; 3	2nd	63
2026	Stanley Team Kunimitsu	Honda Prelude-GT	GT500	OKA; 7	FUJ; 8	FUJ; 1	SUZ; 11	SUG; 3	AUT; 1	MOT; 5	**MOT**; 1		1st	85

^{‡} Half points awarded as less than 75% of race distance was completed.
^{(Number)} Driver did not take part in this sprint race, points are still awarded for the teammate's result.

=== Complete Macau Grand Prix results ===
Year	Team	Car	Qualifying	Quali Race	Main race
2016	(Japan) Toda Racing	Dallara F312	22nd	19th	14th
2017	(Germany) Motopark	Dallara F317	12th	17th	9th

=== Complete FIA Formula 3 European Championship results ===
(key) (Races in bold indicate pole position) (Races in italics indicate fastest lap)

Year	Entrant	Engine	1	2	3	4	5	6	7	8	9	10	11	12	13	14	15	16	17	18	19	20	21	22	23	24	25	26	27	28	29	30	DC	Points
2017	Hitech GP	Mercedes	SIL; 1; 11	SIL; 2; 19	SIL; 3; 15	MNZ; 1; 12	MNZ; 2; 14	MNZ; 3; 13	PAU; 1; 13	PAU; 2; 12	PAU; 3; 7	HUN; 1; 13	HUN; 2; 17	HUN; 3; 17	NOR; 1; 8	NOR; 2; 14	NOR; 3 Ret	SPA; 1	SPA; 2	SPA; 3	ZAN; 1 Ret	ZAN; 2; 15	ZAN; 3; 16	NÜR; 1; 7	NÜR; 2; 4	NÜR; 3; 19	RBR; 1; 5	RBR; 2; 17	RBR; 3; 3	HOC; 1; 9	HOC; 2; 9	HOC; 3; 11	15th	57

=== Complete FIA Formula 2 Championship results ===
(key) (Races in bold indicate pole position) (Races in italics indicate points for the fastest lap of top ten finishers)

Year	Entrant	1	2	3	4	5	6	7	8	9	10	11	12	13	14	15	16	17	18	19	20	21	22	23	24	DC	Points
2018	Russian Time	BHR; FEA; 19	BHR; SPR; 17	BAK; FEA; 9	BAK; SPR; 9	CAT; FEA; 9	CAT; SPR; Ret	MON; FEA; 14†	MON; SPR; Ret	LEC; FEA; 8	LEC; SPR; Ret	RBR; FEA; 7	RBR; SPR; 6	SIL; FEA; 12	SIL; SPR; 11	HUN; FEA; 9	HUN; SPR; 12	SPA; FEA; 12	SPA; SPR; 11	MNZ; FEA; 1	MNZ; SPR; 14	SOC; FEA; 10	SOC; SPR; 11	YMC; FEA; 9	YMC; SPR; Ret	13th	48

^{†} Driver did not finish the race, but was classified as he completed over 90% of the race distance.

=== Complete Super Formula results ===
(key) (Races in bold indicate pole position) (Races in italics indicate fastest lap)

Year	Team	Engine	1	2	3	4	5	6	7	8	9	10	11	12	DC	Points
2019	TCS Nakajima Racing	Honda	**SUZ**; Ret	AUT; 4	SUG; 14	FUJ; 10	MOT; Ret	OKA; 17	SUZ; 13						16th	6
2020	TCS Nakajima Racing	Honda	MOT; 9	OKA; Ret	SUG; 7	AUT; 3	SUZ; Ret	SUZ; 8	FUJ						12th	20
2021	docomo Team Dandelion Racing	Honda	FUJ	SUZ	AUT; 14	SUG; 5^{2}	MOT; 7	MOT; 3	SUZ; 10						9th	24
2022	docomo Team Dandelion Racing	Honda	FUJ; 6	FUJ; Ret	SUZ; 3	AUT; 6^{3}	SUG; 4	FUJ; 5	MOT; 4	MOT; 3	SUZ; 7	SUZ; 9			5th	61
2023	docomo Team Dandelion Racing	Honda	FUJ; 14	FUJ; 8	SUZ; 15	AUT; 6	SUG; 3	**FUJ**; 2^{1}	MOT; Ret	SUZ; 4^{3}‡	SUZ; 10				6th	43
2024	docomo Team Dandelion Racing	Honda	SUZ; 10	AUT; 1^{2}	SUG; 4‡	FUJ; 5	MOT; 1	FUJ; 4	FUJ; 3	SUZ; 3	SUZ; 8				3rd	86
2025	docomo Team Dandelion Racing	Honda	SUZ; 10	SUZ; 1	**MOT**; 1^{1}	MOT; 2^{3}	AUT; 6	FUJ; 5	FUJ; 9	SUG; 10	FUJ; 4‡	SUZ; 3	**SUZ**; 2^{1}	SUZ; 5	4th	113
2026	docomo Team Dandelion Racing	Honda	MOT; 11	MOT; 13	SUZ; 11	SUZ; 6^{3}	FUJ; 3	FUJ; 4	FUJ; 3^{2}	SUG; 6	FUJ; 11	FUJ; 6	SUZ; 4	SUZ; 5	6th	60

^{‡} Half points awarded as less than 75% of race distance was completed.
^{*} Season still in progress.

Sporting positions
Preceded by Kazuya Oshima; Kenta Yamashita	Super GT; GT500 Champion; 2020; With: Naoki Yamamoto	Succeeded by Sho Tsuboi; Yuhi Sekiguchi
Preceded by Sho Tsuboi; Kenta Yamashita	Super GT; GT500 Champion; 2026; With: Naoki Yamamoto	Succeeded by Incumbent
