= Dallara SF19 =

Open-wheel racing car built by Dallara

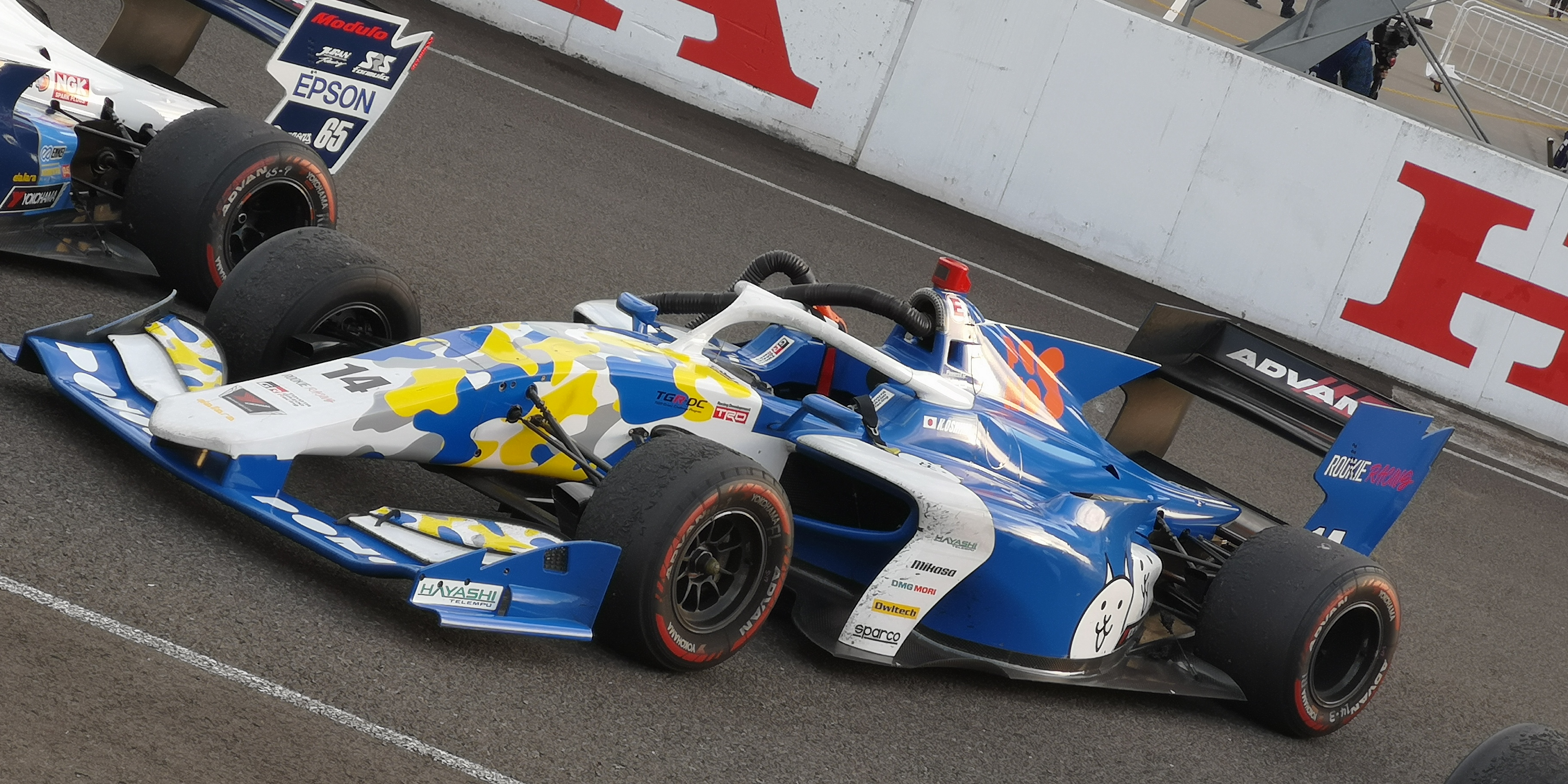
- Toyota-powered SF19 of Rookie Racing in 2020
- Category: Super Formula
- Constructor: Dallara
- Predecessor: Dallara SF14
- Successor: Dallara SF23

Technical specifications
- Chassis: Sandwich Carbon/aluminium honeycomb structure designed by Dallara
- Suspension (front): Pushrod with torsion bar
- Suspension (rear): Pushrod
- Length: 5,233 mm (206 in)
- Width: 1,910 mm (75 in)
- Height: 960 mm (38 in)
- Wheelbase: 3,115 mm (123 in)
- Engine: Honda HR-417E or Toyota RI4A, 2,000 cubic centimetres (2 litres; 122 cubic inches), I4, Turbocharged (supplied by Garrett), mid-mounted
- Transmission: Ricardo 6 forward + 1 reverse semi-automatic paddle-shift
- Power: 550 brake horsepower (560 PS; 410 kW); 500 newton-metres (370 lbf⋅ft)
- Weight: 670 kg (1,477.1 lb) (including driver)
- Fuel: super-unleaded 100 RON
- Brakes: Calipers: Brembo (carbon); Discs: Brembo (carbon)
- Tyres: Yokohama Advan (front: 270/620-R13, rear: 360/620-R13)

Competition history
- Notable entrants: All Super Formula entrants
- Notable drivers: All Super Formula entrants
- Debut: 2019 Super Formula Suzuka round

The Dallara SF19 is an open-wheel single-seater chassis produced by Dallara for use in the Japanese Super Formula championship. It debuted in 2019, replacing the Dallara SF14 chassis. Throughout its production, it was the sole chassis used in Super Formula, however an engine development war between Honda and Toyota can lead to significant performance differences between the Honda and Toyota powered models.

== History ==
The single-seater was introduced in October 2017, on the Suzuka Circuit, and is the only one admitted to the Super Formula championship, the most important open-wheel racing car championship in Japan, starting from the 2019 season.

The first run of the car took place in June 2018, at the Autodromo Riccardo Paletti in Varano de' Melegari, with the Japanese driver Tomoki Nojiri at its head. The driver completed 71 laps and also achieved a track record of 57 seconds, two seconds faster than the previous limit set by a LMP1 car. The first two cars produced were then shipped to Japan, for tests on Fuji Speedway. Nojiri, tests in at home, completed 129 laps, in two days, even if only on the second day he was able to fit dry tires after the rain of the first day. The time obtained, 1'26"173, is two seconds lower than the pole position of 2017, obtained from the SF14. During the tests carried out in August, Nojiri also tried a new display model, placed on the helmet visor.

== Technical specifications ==
The car, compared to the SF14, is based on greater use downforce generated by the underfloor, shifting the balance from the wings to ground effect, in order to increase the chances of overtaking. The appearance is more similar to that of an F1 car, with a fin on the hood, and of the more pronounced sidepods. The Halo is not foreseen in the original project, but Dallara has studied the possibility of its presence.

The Honda and Toyota engines are derived from the ones used in the Super GT series, and are 2.0-litres in displacement, with fuel limiter and push to pass system.
