= Dallara SF14 =

Open-wheel formula racing car built by Dallara

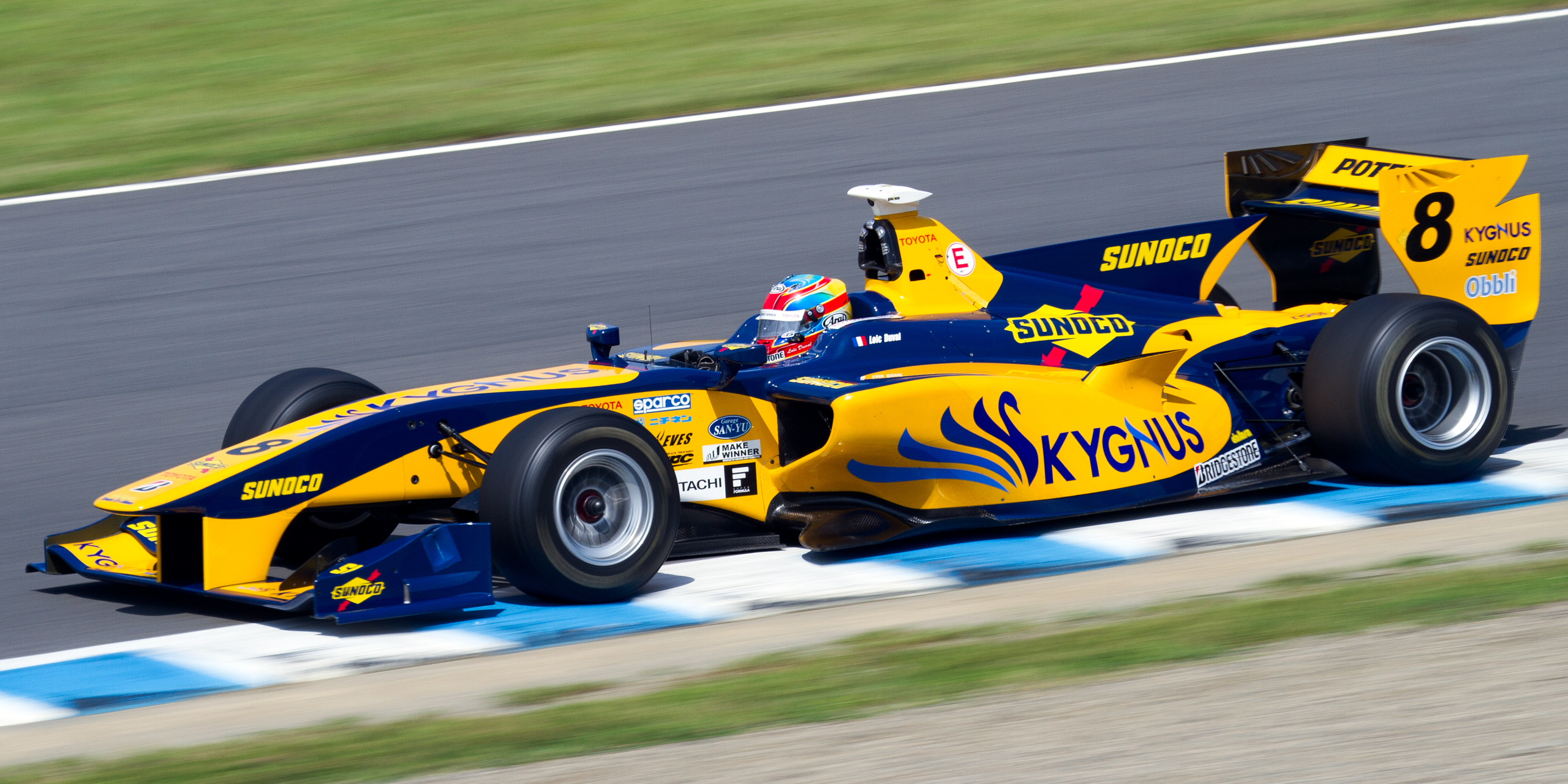
- Toyota-powered SF14 of Team LeMans, driven by Loïc Duval
- Category: Super Formula
- Constructor: Dallara
- Designer: Walter Biasatti
- Predecessor: Swift FN09
- Successor: Dallara SF19

Technical specifications
- Chassis: Sandwich Carbon/aluminium honeycomb structure designed by Dallara
- Suspension (front): Pushrod with torsion bar
- Suspension (rear): Pushrod
- Length: 5,268 mm (207 in)
- Width: 1,900 mm (75 in)
- Height: 960 mm (38 in)
- Wheelbase: 3,165 mm (125 in)
- Engine: Honda HR-414E or Toyota RI4A, 2,000 cubic centimetres (122 cubic inches; 2 litres), I4, Turbocharged (supplied by Garrett), mid-mounted
- Transmission: Ricardo 6 forward + 1 reverse semi-automatic paddle-shift
- Power: 550 brake horsepower (560 PS; 410 kW); 500 newton-metres (370 lbf⋅ft)
- Weight: 660 kg (1,455.1 lb) (including driver)
- Fuel: 100 RON
- Brakes: Calipers: Brembo (carbon); Discs: Brembo (carbon)
- Tyres: 2014–2015 Bridgestone Potenza; 2016– Yokohama Advan (front: 250/620R13, rear: 360/620R13)

Competition history
- Debut: 2014

The Dallara SF14 is a single-seater open-wheel racing car chassis designed and built by the Italian company Dallara. It was the exclusive chassis for the Japanese Super Formula series from the 2014 season through the 2018 season, after which it was replaced by the Dallara SF19.

== History ==
In September 2012, Dallara were announced as the exclusive chassis provider for the next generation Super Formula car. Their first, the SF14 was officially unveiled in March 2013 in Tokyo as the replacement for the Swift FN09. Its design was a collaborative effort, with input from drivers and a focus on safety. The chassis was a sandwich carbon fiber/aluminium build, designed to mirror the 2010 Formula One safety regulations to enhance driver protection. The car's aerodynamic features included a Drag Reduction System (DRS), similar to that used in Formula One, to assist with overtaking. A series of LED lights on the rollhoop of the car light up to demonstrate when a driver is utilising OTC.

The first shakedown was scheduled for July 2013. Kazuki Nakajima (Toyota) and Takuya Izawa (Honda) drove the new SF14 at Fuji Speedway over two days in July, lowering the existing series lap record by three seconds. Further tests were scheduled for Motegi, Sugo and Suzuka.

=== Manufacturing controversy ===
The fact that the series' chassis was made by a non-Japanese company was a source of some controversy. While the chassis was designed and manufactured by Dallara, an Italian company, approximately 30% of the parts were sourced from Japan. The vehicle supply was handled by Le Mans Co, LTD, based in Tokyo.

== Specification ==
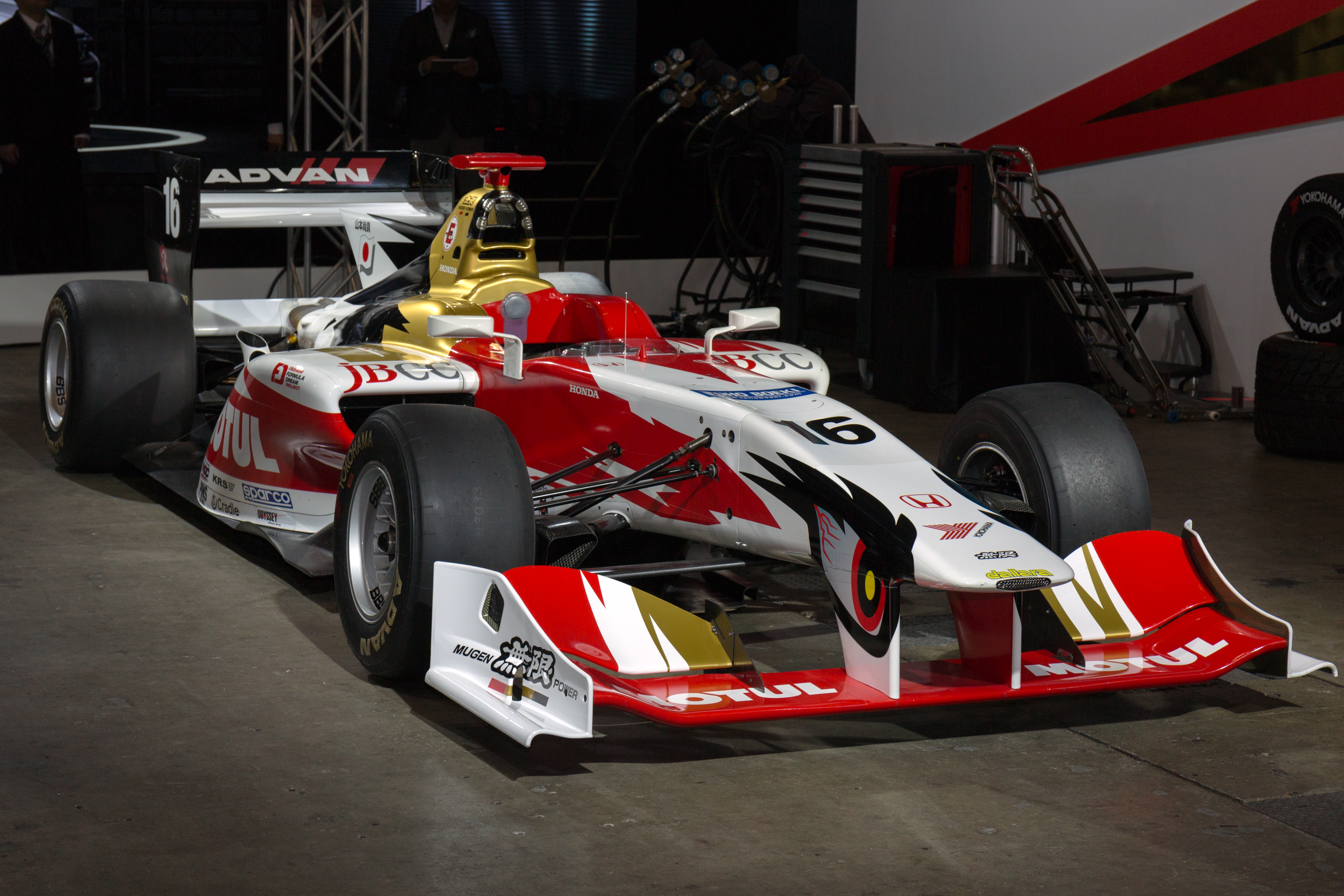
Team Mugen SF14 at the 2017 Tokyo Auto Salon

=== Performance ===
The SF14 was powered by a 2.0-liter turbocharged four-cylinder engine, with manufacturers Honda and Toyota confirmed as the sole suppliers. The engines produced around 550 horsepower. The car's low weight, combined with its powerful engine, allowed it to exceed speeds of 320 km/h (200 mph).

Honda utilised their HR series engines, whilst Toyota used RI power units manufactured by Gazoo Racing.

=== Tyres ===
The SF14 debuted with Bridgestone Potenza tyres, but in 2016 was replaced by Yokohama as the exclusive control tyre supplier to the series.

== Statistics ==
Records
Record	Holder	Achieved
Most race wins	(Germany) Andre Lotterer	6
Most championships	(Japan) Hiroaki Ishiura	2
Most starts	(Japan) Hiroaki Ishiura (Japan) Yuji Kunimoto (Japan) Naoki Yamamoto (Japan) Tomoki Nojiri (India) Narain Karthikeyan	39
Fastest lap	(Japan) Kazuki Nakajima	00.44.008; Tsukuba Circuit
