= Honda HR-414E/HR-417E/HR-420E engine =

Honda HR-414E/HR-417E/HR-420E

Overview
- Manufacturer: Honda
- Production: 2013-present

Layout
- Configuration: Inline-4
- Displacement: 2.0 L (122 cu in)
- Cylinder bore: 86–90 mm (3.39–3.54 in)
- Piston stroke: Free but typically approximately between 86–90 mm (3.39–3.54 in)
- Cylinder block material: Die cast steel or aluminium alloy. Machining process from a solid is not permitted
- Cylinder head material: Die cast steel or aluminium alloy
- Valvetrain: DOHC 16-valve (four-valves per cylinder)
- Compression ratio: 15:1

Combustion
- Turbocharger: Single-turbocharged by Garrett Advancing Motion with 3.5 bar (51 psi) of turbo boost pressure
- Fuel system: Bosch HDEV6 350 bar (5,076 psi) central high-pressure gasoline direct fuel injection. One direct injector per cylinder fed by an engine-driven high-pressure fuel pump
- Management: Bosch Motronic MS 7.4
- Fuel type: Various (102 RON unleaded racing gasoline)
- Oil system: Dry sump
- Cooling system: Single mechanical water pump feeding a single-sided cooling system

Output
- Power output: 550 PS (542 hp; 405 kW)
- Torque output: > 490 N⋅m (360 lbf⋅ft)

Dimensions
- Length: 600 mm (23.62 in)
- Width: 697 mm (27.44 in)
- Height: 693 mm (27.28 in)
- Dry weight: 187 lb (85 kg) including turbocharger

The Honda HR-414E, HR-417E and Honda HR-420E are a series of prototype, four-stroke 2.0-litre single-turbocharged inline-4 racing engines, developed and produced by Honda for the Super GT series and Super Formula under the Nippon Race Engine framework. The HR-420E engine is fully custom-built.

== Versions ==
- HR-414E (2013–2016)
- HR-417E (2017–present)
- HR-420E (2020–present)

== Applications ==
- Dallara SF14
- Dallara SF19
- Dallara SF23
- Honda NSX Concept-GT
- Honda NSX-GT
- Honda NSX-GT "Type S"
- Honda Civic Type R-GT
- Honda HRC Prelude-GT

== See also ==
- Toyota RI engine, similar engine also developed under the Nippon Race Engine framework
- Nissan NR engine, similar engine also developed under the Nippon Race Engine framework
