= Toyota RI engine =

Toyota RI

Overview
- Manufacturer: Toyota Gazoo Racing
- Production: 2013–present

Layout
- Configuration: Inline-4
- Displacement: 2.0 L (122 cu in)
- Cylinder bore: 86–90 mm (3.39–3.54 in)
- Piston stroke: Free but typically approximately between 86–90 mm (3.39–3.54 in)
- Cylinder block material: Die cast steel or aluminium alloy. Machining process from a solid is not permitted
- Cylinder head material: Die cast steel or aluminium alloy
- Valvetrain: DOHC 16-valve (four-valves per cylinder)
- Compression ratio: 15:1

Combustion
- Turbocharger: Single-turbocharged by Garrett Advancing Motion with 3.5 bar (51 psi) of turbo boost pressure
- Fuel system: Bosch HDEV6 350 bar (5,076 psi) central high-pressure gasoline direct fuel injection. One direct injector per cylinder fed by an engine-driven high-pressure fuel pump
- Management: Bosch Motronic MS 7.4
- Fuel type: Various (102 RON unleaded racing gasoline)
- Oil system: Dry sump
- Cooling system: Single mechanical water pump feeding a single-sided cooling system

Output
- Power output: 550–679.8 PS (542–671 hp; 405–500 kW)
- Torque output: 500–700 N⋅m (370–520 lbf⋅ft)

Dimensions
- Length: 600 mm (23.62 in)
- Width: 697 mm (27.44 in)
- Height: 693 mm (27.28 in)
- Dry weight: 187 lb (85 kg) including turbocharger

The Toyota RI is a family of prototype four-stroke 2.0-litre single-turbocharged inline-4 racing engines, developed and produced by Toyota, for the Super GT series and Super Formula under the Nippon Race Engine framework. The RI engine is fully custom-built.

== Versions ==
The RI engine comes in two different versions for different applications; the RI4A for use in Super Formula and the RI4AG for use in Super GT.

- RI4A (2013–present, also known as TRD-01F)
- RI4AG (2013–2023)
- RI4BG (2024–present)

== Applications ==
- Dallara SF14
- Dallara SF19
- Dallara SF23
- Lexus RC F GT500
- Lexus LC 500 GT500
- Toyota GR Supra GT500

== See also ==
- Honda HR-414E/HR-417E/HR-420E engine, similar engines also developed under the Nippon Race Engine framework
- Nissan NR engine, similar engine also developed under the Nippon Race Engine framework
