= 2022 Super Formula Championship =

Japanese open wheel motor racing

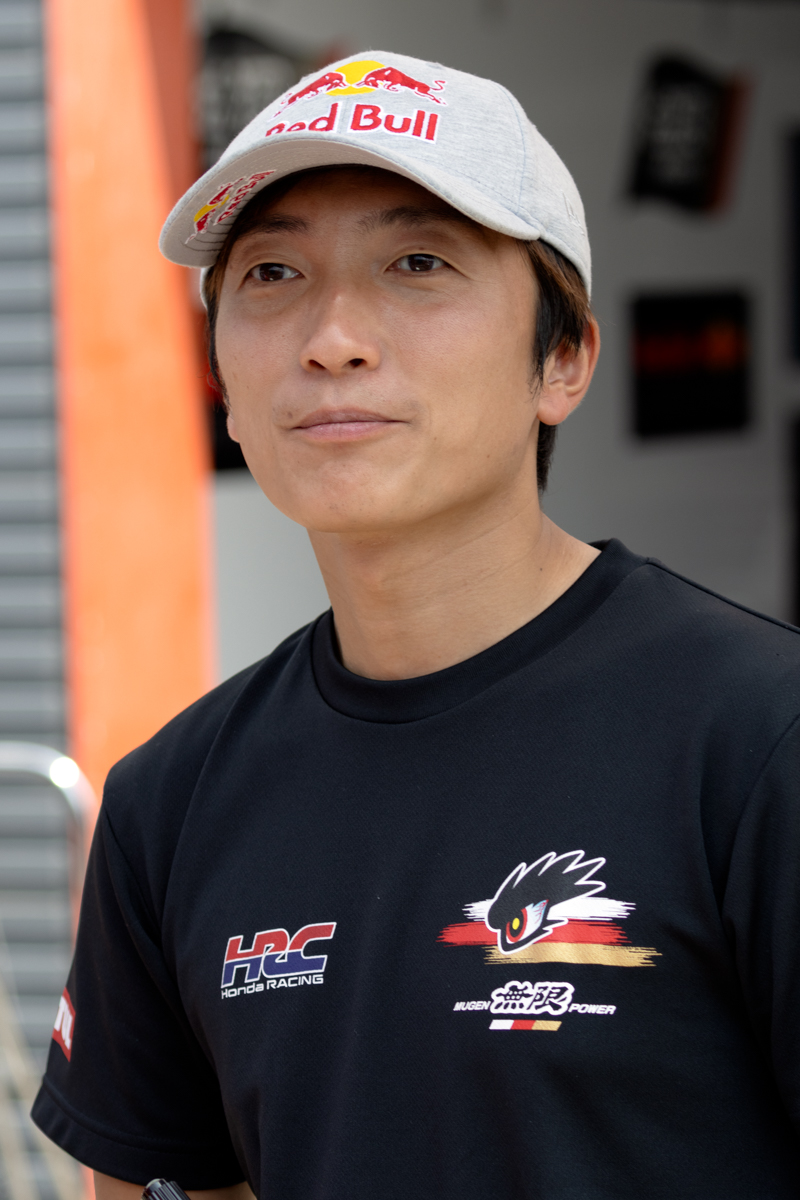
Tomoki Nojiri won his second Super Formula Championship title.

The 2022 Japanese Super Formula Championship was the fiftieth season of premier Japanese open-wheel motor racing, and the tenth under the moniker of Super Formula. It started in April 2022 and was contested over ten rounds across seven race meetings.

Tomoki Nojiri defended his championship title at the penultimate race, the first back-to-back series champion since Tsugio Matsuda in 2007 and 2008. His team, Team Mugen, was also crowned teams' champion after the same race, for the first time in its competition history.

== Teams and drivers ==
Every Honda-powered car used a Honda HR-414E engine and every Toyota-powered car used a Toyota RI4A engine.

Team	Engine	No.	Driver name	Rounds
(Japan) Team Mugen	Honda	1	(Japan) Tomoki Nojiri	All
(Japan) Team Mugen	Honda	15	(Japan) Ukyo Sasahara	All
(Japan) Kondo Racing	Toyota	3	(Japan) Kenta Yamashita	All
(Japan) Kondo Racing	Toyota	4	(France) Sacha Fenestraz	All
(Japan) Docomo Team Dandelion Racing	Honda	5	(Japan) Tadasuke Makino	All
(Japan) Docomo Team Dandelion Racing	Honda	6	(Japan) Hiroki Otsu	All
(Hong Kong) KCMG	Toyota	7	(Japan) Kamui Kobayashi	All
(Hong Kong) KCMG	Toyota	18	(Japan) Yuji Kunimoto	All
(Japan) ThreeBond Drago Corse	Honda	12	(Japan) Nirei Fukuzumi	All
(Japan) docomo business ROOKIE	Toyota	14	(Japan) Kazuya Oshima	All
(Japan) Carenex Team Impul	Toyota	19	(Japan) Yuhi Sekiguchi	All
(Japan) Carenex Team Impul	Toyota	20	(Japan) Ryo Hirakawa	All
(Japan) Kuo Vantelin Team TOM’S	Toyota	36	(France) Giuliano Alesi	All
(Japan) Kuo Vantelin Team TOM’S	Toyota	37	(Japan) Ritomo Miyata	All
(Japan) P.mu/Cerumo・INGING	Toyota	38	(Japan) Sho Tsuboi	All
(Japan) P.mu/Cerumo・INGING	Toyota	39	(Japan) Sena Sakaguchi	All
(Japan) B-Max Racing	Honda	50	(Japan) Nobuharu Matsushita	All
(Japan) Team Goh	Honda	53	(Japan) Ren Sato	All
(Japan) Team Goh	Honda	55	(Japan) Atsushi Miyake	All
(Japan) TCS Nakajima Racing	Honda	64	(Japan) Naoki Yamamoto	All
(Japan) TCS Nakajima Racing	Honda	65	(Japan) Toshiki Oyu	All

=== Team changes ===
- Rookie Racing has new sponsor from docomo business, the team be named as docomo business ROOKIE.
- KCMG ended their title sponsorship with car audio brand carrozzeria after four season.
- Team Goh, who partnered with Mugen to run the number 15 Red Bull sponsored car in 2021, now operated as an independent two-car team with Honda engines. The team was operated by Servus Japan, a racing engineering outfit best known for operating Autobacs Racing Team Aguri (ARTA) in Super GT.
- B-Max Racing planned to enter two cars, after running just one car for Nobuharu Matsushita in 2021. They confirmed on 4 March that they would continue to run one car, after a failed attempt to enter a non-Japanese driver in their second car, as 2021 Formula Regional Americas Championship champion Kyffin Simpson declined the opportunity offered by Honda Performance Development (Honda's United States motorsport operation, which supplies engines to the Formula 4 United States and Formula Regional Americas championships) to the series champion because of pandemic-related restrictions.
- With the initial plan to enter one car for the season, Team Mugen reverted to run two cars this season, with the second car leased from B-Max Racing who originally planned to enter two cars.

=== Driver changes ===
- Giuliano Alesi competed full time with Kuo Vantelin Team TOM’S, replacing the retired two-time series champion Kazuki Nakajima who retired from motorsport to take the role of vice-chairman at Toyota Gazoo Racing Europe. Alesi had replaced Nakajima for five rounds in 2021, and finished runner-up in the Super Formula Lights Championship.
- 2021 Super Formula Championship runner-up Nirei Fukuzumi moved to ThreeBond Drago Corse, replacing Tatiana Calderon, who departed the series after making nine starts in the last two seasons.
- Hiroki Otsu, 2021 Rookie of the Year recipient and race winner with Red Bull Mugen Team Goh, filled the Dandelion Racing seat vacated by Fukuzumi.
- Ren Sato, who finished third in Super Formula Lights, was promoted to Super Formula as one of Team Goh's two drivers for 2022 after also being recruited as a Red Bull Junior Team driver. Atsushi Miyake, who finished fourth in Super Formula Lights, was later confirmed for the second Team Goh entry.
- Ukyo Sasahara, who substituted for Tadasuke Makino in two rounds last season, joined Team Mugen full-time with sponsorship from Bingo (BH Auction).

== Race calendar ==
The provisional calendar was announced on 6 August 2021. On 31 January, it was announced that three of the race meetings would be double-header rounds, consisting of two races per weekend: The opening weekend at Fuji Speedway in April, the mid-August weekend at Mobility Resort Motegi, and the season-ending JAF Grand Prix at Suzuka.

Round	Circuit	Location	Date
1	Fuji Speedway	Oyama, Shizuoka	9 April
2	Fuji Speedway	Oyama, Shizuoka	10 April
3	Suzuka International Racing Course	Suzuka, Mie	24 April
4	Autopolis	Hita, Oita	22 May
5	Sportsland SUGO	Shibata, Miyagi	19 June
6	Fuji Speedway	Oyama, Shizuoka	17 July
7	Mobility Resort Motegi	Motegi, Tochigi	20 August
8	Mobility Resort Motegi	Motegi, Tochigi	21 August
9	Suzuka International Racing Course	Suzuka, Mie	29 October
10	Suzuka International Racing Course	Suzuka, Mie	30 October

== Regulation changes ==
As a measure to help reduce the amount of tyre usage, qualifying now consisted of two phases of knockout qualifying, Q1 and Q2, instead of three phases. The field was split into two groups for Q1, and the fastest six drivers from each Q1 group advanced to Q2.

For single race meetings, there was a 90-minute free practice session held on Saturday prior to qualifying, and then a 30-minute free practice session before the race. For double-header weekends, there was a single 90 minute free practice session on Friday, and two separate qualifying sessions in the morning to set the grid for each afternoon's race.

Points scored in all races now counted towards the final championship standings. In 2020 and 2021, only the top five out of seven scores were counted towards the championship.

== Results ==
Round	Circuit	Pole Position	Fastest Lap	Winning driver	Winning team
1	Fuji Speedway	(Japan) Ukyo Sasahara	(Japan) Ryo Hirakawa	(Japan) Ryo Hirakawa	(Japan) Carenex Team Impul
2	Fuji Speedway	(Japan) Tomoki Nojiri	(Japan) Yuhi Sekiguchi	(Japan) Tomoki Nojiri	(Japan) Team Mugen
3	Suzuka International Racing Course	(Japan) Tomoki Nojiri	(Japan) Tomoki Nojiri	(Japan) Nobuharu Matsushita	(Japan) B-Max Racing
4	Autopolis	(Japan) Tomoki Nojiri	(Japan) Atsushi Miyake	(Japan) Ryo Hirakawa	(Japan) Carenex Team Impul
5	Sportsland SUGO	(Japan) Tomoki Nojiri	(Japan) Yuhi Sekiguchi	(France) Sacha Fenestraz	(Japan) Kondo Racing
6	Fuji Speedway	(Japan) Yuhi Sekiguchi	(Japan) Toshiki Oyu	(Japan) Ukyo Sasahara	(Japan) Team Mugen
7	Mobility Resort Motegi	(Japan) Naoki Yamamoto	(Japan) Naoki Yamamoto	(Japan) Naoki Yamamoto	(Japan) TCS Nakajima Racing
8	Mobility Resort Motegi	(Japan) Toshiki Oyu	(Japan) Kazuya Oshima	(Japan) Yuhi Sekiguchi	(Japan) Carenex Team Impul
9	Suzuka International Racing Course	(Japan) Tomoki Nojiri	(Japan) Ritomo Miyata	(Japan) Ukyo Sasahara	(Japan) Team Mugen
10	Suzuka International Racing Course	(Japan) Tomoki Nojiri	(Japan) Ren Sato	(Japan) Tomoki Nojiri	(Japan) Team Mugen

== Season summary ==
=== First half ===
The opening round at Fuji Speedway in early April began with Ukyo Sasahara taking a surprise maiden pole in qualifying, ahead of Ren Sato. Both front row starters had bad luck, though, with Sasahara stalling and Sato getting spun around by Hiroki Otsu. This handed Ryo Hirakawa the lead, ahead of Sacha Fenestraz, and the pair soon started fighting, with both leading the race at times. Hirakawa was in the lead by the time he pitted on lap 25 and came out in second behind Tomoki Nojiri, who had pitted earlier. He used his fresher tires to close up to the leader, and was able to get by Nojiri around the outside of turn 13 on lap 30. Hirakawa then went on to win the race. Fenestraz was unable to follow Hirakawa through, so he had to be content with third place.

The second race of the Fuji double-header saw Nojiri claim his eighth career pole in qualifying. He led Ritomo Miyata at the start, while Sasahara in third stalled again. The safety car was called on lap one when Nobuharu Matsushita spun Tadasuke Makino around and ended his race. Fenestraz was eliminated from contention when he spun around after the restart. Stopping later was once again the better strategy: Hirakawa ran in fifth before stopping, and was able to undercut four cars by virtue of stopping later than them, on lap 24. Nojiri pitted another lap later, and was able to defend his lead on fresher tires. He led Hirakawa home, with the gap between the top two remaining fairly static in the final stages of the race. Miyata came home third to round out the podium. Nojiri left Fuji leading the championship, two points ahead of Hirakawa.

Suzuka hosted round three of the season, and Nojiri continued his qualifying form, grabbing pole again. He kept Kenta Yamashita behind at the start, who was unable to keep up the pace and got passed by Makino and Matshushita. In wet conditions, a pitstop was no longer mandatory, and most drivers elected to run the race on a single set of wet tires. Nojiri dominated most of the race, with Makino and Matsushita only closing up slowly. Four laps from the end, Matsushita made a decisive move on Makino and got second place. He had managed to keep his tires from overheating better than everyone around him, so he rapidly closed up to leader Nojiri, overtook him two laps later and claimed his maiden Super Formula win. Nojiri's second place still grew his championship lead to 16 points, as Hirakawa had a bad weekend and earned just four points.

Nojiri kept his one-lap pace at Autopolis, scoring his third pole in a row. Next to him, Miyata had a poor start, first getting passed by Makino and then accidentally sending Sasahara off track when defending. Hirakawa used this to his advantage, starting from eighth and climbing up to third by the time the safety car was deployed for a crashed Toshiki Oyu. Shortly after the restart, Hirakawa was able to move past Makino into second place, before another interruption, this time because of Kamui Kobayashi retiring with damage. When Nojiri then pitted on lap 16, Hirakawa elected to stay out, comfortably overcutting his rival. Nojiri was struggling with pace in his second stint, dropping back to fourth, behind Fenestraz and Atsushi Miyake. This saw his championship lead over Hirakawa cut down to seven points.

When the first half of the season came to a close at Sugo, Nojiri extended his pole position streak to four, with Hirakawa struggling again in qualifying. Fenestraz started second and moved past Nojiri at the start, before two early safety car periods for Yamashita and Matsushita caused differing strategies across the field. Most drivers took their mandatory pitstop early on during the second safety car, the leaders among them. Seven cars remained out to stop later, so the frontrunners risked getting held up by the slower of those cars, allowing those in front to build a gap and overcut them. The off-strategy group led by Miyata failed to build up a big enough gap, so Miyata ended up fifth after his stop, allowing Fenestraz to claim his maiden win ahead of Oyu and Nojiri. Hirakawa was only able to finish seventh, so Nojiri's lead now stood at 17 points.

=== Second half ===
When the championship returned to Fuji in July, Yuhi Sekiguchi ended Nojiri's qualifying streak in a disrupted wet session. An eventful race saw Hirakawa and Miyake retiring after a battle with Oyu in the first turn, before Fenestraz suffered a heavy crash on lap two that triggered a safety car. Many drivers elected to stop early, Nojiri in second among them on lap ten. When race leader Sekiguchi came into the pits on lap 25, his left rear wheel was not fitted properly and it came off when he returned to the track. This prompted another safety car, advantaging those yet to stop. Sasahara stopped on lap 27 and came out in the lead, ahead of Sho Tsuboi, who was just able to hold off Nojiri. Sasahara claimed his maiden win from 13th on the grid. As Hirakawa and Fenestraz both retired, Nojiri was able to extend his championship lead to 29 points.

The double-header at Motegi began with three-time series champion Naoki Yamamoto claiming pole for race one, his first since 2020. Rain shortly before the race caused a safety car start that saw the polesitter lead away comfortably ahead of Fenestraz and Oyu. This order remained until Oyu suffered from gearbox issues on lap 14 that saw him drop back and pit. On lap 27, the safety car was deployed again when Hirakawa beached his car in the gravel. With Fenestraz unable to pass Yamamoto and wet conditions again eliminating the mandatory pitstop, Yamamoto was able to lead Fenestraz home to win his first race in two years. Nojiri had a rather uneventful race on his way to complete the podium. Hirakawas non-score and Fenestraz's second place saw Fenestraz overhaul Hirakawa in the standings, now 30 points behind Nojiri.

A day later, it was the other TCS Nakajima Racing driver, Oyu, on pole ahead of Fenestraz. The latter was jumped by Nojiri at the start, and the order settled, with Yamashita the first of the frontrunners to pit, albeit because of a technical issue. Several drivers running further behind also pitted early to maximize the running in clean air, with Sekiguchi benefitting the most of that strategy. He pitted from sixth and undercut the lead group to come out second, with only Hirakawa in front of him who was yet to pit. He did so on lap 30, coming out in fourth, but with the freshest tires. He quickly dispatched Nojiri and Makino to close up to his teammate, but a thrilling battle for the lead ultimately saw him concede victory to Sekiguchi, following him home to secure Team Impul's first one-two since 2008. Nojiri slightly grew his lead over Fenestraz to 32 points.

The final weekend of the season saw the championship return to Suzuka, where Nojiri cemented his title ambitions with pole for race one, especially with Fenestraz starting 17th and Hirakawa eleventh. Front-row starter Miyata slipped back at the start, while Nojiri's teammate Sasahara climbed to second and immediately pressured Nojiri. Sasahara then pitted a lap earlier than Nojiri and used his warmed-up tires to pass his teammate for the net race lead. Miyata was the last of the frontrunners to pit and looked set to round out the podium, before a slow stop put him out of contention and promoted Sato to third. With his rivals in 16th and ninth place, Nojiri only had to follow his teammate home to secure his second championship in a row, as well as Team Mugen's first teams' title. Fenestraz and Hirakawa stood level on points ahead of the season finale.

Wrapping up the title the day before did not slow Nojiri down one bit, as he was back on pole for the last race of the season. At the start, Otsu and Sasahara got by Miyata for second and third, before Nirei Fukuzumi crashed into the barriers at turn one and prompted a safety car. Sasahara dropped back at the restart, and Otsu was the first of the new lead trio to pit. Giuliano Alesi then collided with Matsushita at Casio Triangle, sending him into the barriers and causing another safety car, so the other leaders were granted a cheaper pitstop. The top three of Nojiri, Otsu and Miyata then remained the same for the rest of the race, with Fenestraz in fourth claiming second place in the standings ahead of Hirakawa, who came fifth. Sato was 19th, but still able to earn the Rookie of the Year title ahead of Miyake.

While Nojiri had only two wins, he only finished outside the top three on two times and never came lower than fourth place. His resounding qualifying form granted him six pole positions and 20 bonus points from qualifying alone. This consistency and one-lap pace meant he shook off Hirakawa's championship chase early on, and never looked seriously threatened by him or Fenestraz later on. After two seasons of restricted borders, customs troubles and uncertainty about government restrictions, the championship enjoyed a relatively stable season without any mid-season driver changes. 21 cars entered every round, a high-point for the series.

== Championship standings ==
Race points

Position	**1st**	**2nd**	**3rd**	**4th**	**5th**	**6th**	**7th**	**8th**	**9th**	**10th**
Points	20	15	11	8	6	5	4	3	2	1

Qualifying points

Position	**1st**	**2nd**	**3rd**
Points	3	2	1

=== Drivers' championship ===
Pos	Driver	FUJ1		SUZ1	AUT	SUG	FUJ2	MOT		SUZ2		Points
1	(Japan) Tomoki Nojiri	2	**1**^{1}	**2**^{1}	**4**^{1}	**3**^{1}	3^{3}	3	4^{3}	**2**^{1}	**1**^{1}	154
2	(France) Sacha Fenestraz	3	20	4^{3}	2	1^{2}	Ret	2^{2}	6^{2}	16	4	89
3	(Japan) Ryo Hirakawa	1^{3}	2	7	1	7	Ret	Ret	2	9	5	87
4	(Japan) Ritomo Miyata	5	3^{2}	18	5^{2}	6	4	8	14	5^{2}	3^{2}	64
5	(Japan) Tadasuke Makino	6	Ret	3	6^{3}	4	5	4	3	7	9	61
6	(Japan) Ukyo Sasahara	**19**^{1}	10^{3}	14	7	10	1	7	8	1	17	57
7	(Japan) Yuhi Sekiguchi	4	6	11	16	15	**Ret**^{1}	9	1	6	11	43
8	(Japan) Toshiki Oyu	7	11	13	Ret	2	10	Ret^{3}	**5**^{1}	4^{3}	7	43
9	(Japan) Hiroki Otsu	16	7	8	9	5^{3}	15	10	13	13	2^{3}	33
10	(Japan) Naoki Yamamoto	14	14	9	14	12	9	**1**^{1}	16	11	6	32
11	(Japan) Sho Tsuboi	8	12	20	13	11	2^{2}	5	10	8	12	30
12	(Japan) Ren Sato	9^{2}	13	10	17	16	6	12	7	3	19	25
13	(Japan) Nobuharu Matsushita	Ret	19	1	10	Ret	Ret	11	11	17	Ret	21
14	(Japan) Atsushi Miyake	10	5	Ret	3	18	Ret	Ret	15	12	8	21
15	(Japan) Kenta Yamashita	11	4	16^{2}	12	Ret	7	6	Ret	14	13	19
16	(Japan) Yuji Kunimoto	13	15	6	11	9	8	15	12	20	18	10
17	(Japan) Kamui Kobayashi	18	9	5	Ret	17	14	14	17	18	10	9
18	(Japan) Sena Sakaguchi	12	17	12	8	19	12	16	9	10	14	6
19	(Japan) Nirei Fukuzumi	Ret	16	17	DSQ	8	11	Ret	Ret	15	Ret	3
20	(France) Giuliano Alesi	17	8	15	Ret	13	Ret	13	Ret	21	16	3
21	(Japan) Kazuya Oshima	15	18	19	15	14	13	17	18	19	15	0
Pos	Driver	FUJ1		SUZ1	AUT	SUG	FUJ2	MOT		SUZ2		Points

Key
Colour	Result
Gold	Winner
Silver	Second place
Bronze	Third place
Green	Other points position
Blue	Other classified position
Blue	Not classified, finished (NC)
Purple	Not classified, retired (Ret)
Red	Did not qualify (DNQ)
Red	Did not pre-qualify (DNPQ)
Black	Disqualified (DSQ)
White	Did not start (DNS)
White	Race cancelled (C)
Blank	Did not practice (DNP)
Blank	Excluded (EX)
Blank	Did not arrive (DNA)
Blank	Withdrawn (WD)
Blank	Did not enter (cell empty)
Text formatting	Meaning
**Bold**	Pole position
Italics	Fastest lap

=== Teams' championship ===
Pos	Team	FUJ1		SUZ1	AUT	SUG	FUJ2	MOT		SUZ2		Points
1	(Japan) Team Mugen	2	1	2	4	3	1	3	4	1	1	187
1	(Japan) Team Mugen	19	10	14	7	10	3	7	8	2	17	187
2	(Japan) Carenex Team Impul	1	2	7	1	7	Ret	9	1	6	5	126
2	(Japan) Carenex Team Impul	4	6	11	16	15	Ret	Ret	2	9	11	126
3	(Japan) Kondo Racing	3	4	4	2	1	7	2	6	14	4	99
3	(Japan) Kondo Racing	11	20	20	12	Ret	Ret	6	Ret	16	13	99
4	(Japan) Docomo Team Dandelion Racing	6	7	3	6	4	5	4	3	7	2	91
4	(Japan) Docomo Team Dandelion Racing	16	Ret	8	9	5	15	10	13	13	9	91
5	(Japan) TCS Nakajima Racing	7	11	9	14	2	9	1	5	4	6	67
5	(Japan) TCS Nakajima Racing	14	14	13	Ret	12	10	Ret	16	11	7	67
6	(Japan) Kuo Vantelin Team TOM’S	5	3	15	5	6	4	8	14	5	3	59
6	(Japan) Kuo Vantelin Team TOM’S	17	8	18	Ret	13	Ret	13	Ret	21	16	59
7	(Japan) Team Goh	9	5	10	3	16	6	12	7	3	8	44
7	(Japan) Team Goh	10	13	Ret	17	18	Ret	Ret	15	12	19	44
8	(Japan) P.mu/Cerumo・INGING	8	12	12	8	11	2	5	9	8	12	34
8	(Japan) P.mu/Cerumo・INGING	12	17	20	13	19	12	16	10	10	14	34
9	(Japan) B-Max Racing	Ret	19	1	10	Ret	Ret	11	11	17	Ret	21
10	(Hong Kong) KCMG	13	9	5	11	9	8	14	12	18	10	19
10	(Hong Kong) KCMG	18	15	6	Ret	17	14	15	17	20	18	19
11	(Japan) ThreeBond Drago Corse	Ret	16	17	DSQ	8	11	Ret	Ret	15	Ret	3
12	(Japan) docomo business ROOKIE	15	18	19	15	14	13	17	18	19	15	0
Pos	Team	FUJ1		SUZ1	AUT	SUG	FUJ2	MOT		SUZ2		Points
