= Hiroki Otsu =

Japanese racing driver (born 1994)

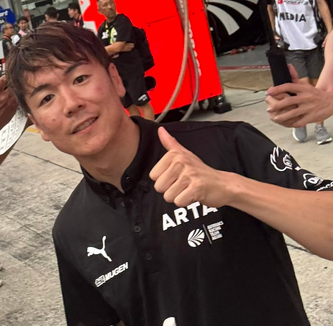
- Otsu at the 2025 Super GT Malaysia Festival
- Nationality: (Japan) Japanese
- Born: 25 May 1994 (age 32) Kasukabe, Saitama, Japan

Super GT career
- Debut season: 2020
- Current team: ARTA
- Categorisation: FIA Gold
- Car number: 8
- Former teams: Nakajima Racing
- Starts: 42
- Wins: 1
- Podiums: 3
- Poles: 2
- Fastest laps: 3
- Best finish: 4th in 2023

Previous series
- 2020-24 2018-19 2016-17,19 2015: Super Formula; Super GT GT300; Japanese Formula 3 Championship; F4 Japanese Championship

Hiroki Otsu (大津弘樹, Ōtsu Hiroki; born 25 May 1994) is a Japanese racing driver who is currently competing in Super GT with ARTA, and in Super Formula for TCS Nakajima Racing as a substitute driver for Naoki Yamamoto.

== Career ==
=== Early career ===
Otsu started his motorsport career in karting in 2007, in which he remained active until 2010. In 2013, he switched to formula racing to participate in the Suzuka Circuit Racing School Formula, which is only intended to train drivers. In 2014, he competed in the JAP Japanese Formula 4 Championship and finished fifth in the FC class. In 2015, he made the move to the new Japanese Formula 4 Championship, where he raced as a Honda protégé for the Honda Formula Dream Project team. He took five podiums and finished third in the final standings with 108 points, behind Sho Tsuboi and Tadasuke Makino.

=== Japanese Formula 3 ===
In 2016, Otsu made the move to the Japanese Formula 3 Championship, racing for the HFDP Racing team. He achieved five points finishes, with fifth place on the Okayama International Circuit as the best result. As a result, he finished tenth in the final standings with six points. In 2017, he made the move to the TODA Racing team within the class. During the season, he was on the podium six times before winning the season finale at the Sportsland SUGO. With 79 points, he finished fifth in the final standings behind Mitsunori Takaboshi, Sho Tsuboi, Álex Palou and Ritomo Miyata.

In 2019, Otsu returned to the series race with the ThreeBond Racing team. He took three podium finishes at Autopolis, Fuji Speedway and Twin Ring Motegi, finishing sixth in the standings with 36 points.

=== Super GT ===
==== GT300 ====
In 2018, Otsu made his Super GT debut, sharing a Honda NSX GT3 with Ryo Michigami in the GT300 class for the Modulo Drago Corse team that Michigami owned. They achieved a podium finish at Autopolis and were fourteenth in the championship with 24 points. In 2019, he took a podium place at Fuji with Michigami and finished seventeenth in the championship with 19 points.

==== GT500 ====
In 2020, Otsu made the move to the GT500 class in Super GT, sharing a Honda NSX-GT GT500 with Takuya Izawa for the Modulo Nakajima Racing team. They achieved two pole positions at the Suzuka International Racing Course and Motegi, but were only on the podium at Motegi. With 31 points, the duo finished twelfth in the final standings.

For 2023, Otsu joined ARTA after the team expanded to two cars, he paired with Nirei Fukuzumi. Both pairs won a race and three podiums as they ended up fourth place. In 2024, Otsu stayed with the team, but was paired with Ren Sato.

=== Super Formula ===
At the end of 2020, Otsu made his debut in the Super Formula season finale with the TCS Nakajima Racing team at Fuji, replacing Tadasuke Makino, who suffered from meningitis and needed rest. He finished thirteenth in the race.

In 2021, Otsu made his full-time debut in Super Formula with Team Mugen together with Team Goh under the Red Bull colours. He went on to get his first pole position in the series and win the race in the sixth round of the season at Motegi.

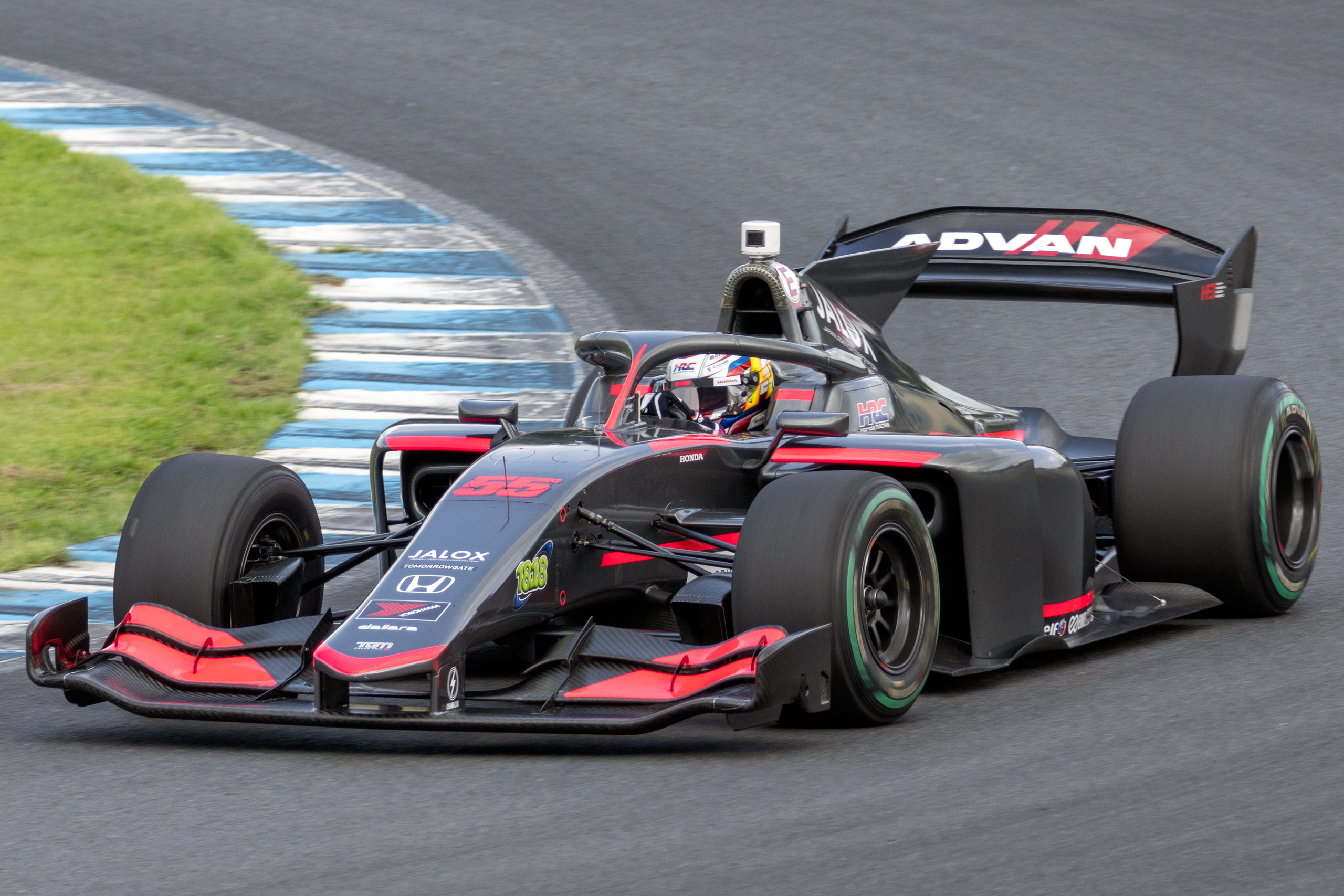
Otsu at Mobility Resort Motegi in 2024

For 2022, Otsu moved to Dandelion Racing, but was underwhelming from his previous season. He ended up in ninth place with one podium. Otsu did not have a full time seat for 2023, but served as a replacement for drivers that were not available due to illness and injuries. He replaced Tomoki Nojiri, Toshiki Oyu, and Naoki Yamamoto at Mugen, TGM Grand Prix, and Nakajima Racing respectively. Otsu would race for six rounds in 2024 with TGM Grand Prix, as he replaced Nobuharu Matsushita.

== Racing record ==
=== Career summary ===
Season	Series	Team	Races	Wins	Poles	F/Laps	Podiums	Points	Position
2015	F4 Japanese Championship	Honda Formula Dream Project	14	0	1	0	5	108	**3rd**
2016	Japanese Formula 3 Championship	Honda Formula Dream Project	17	0	0	0	0	16	10th
2017	Japanese Formula 3 Championship	TODA Racing	20	1	2	0	7	64	5th
2018	Super GT - GT300	Drago Corse	8	0	0	0	1	24	14th
2018	Super Taikyu - ST-TCR	Modulo Racing with Dome	6	3	0	0	6	156‡	**1st‡**
2019	Japanese Formula 3 Championship	ThreeBond Racing	20	0	0	0	3	36	6th
2019	Super GT - GT300	Drago Corse	8	0	0	0	1	19	17th
2019	Intercontinental GT Challenge	Modulo Drago Corse	1	0	0	0	0	0	NC
2019	Super Taikyu - ST-TCR	Modulo Racing with Dome	6	2	1	2	2	88‡	**2nd‡**
2020	Super GT - GT500	Modulo Nakajima Racing	8	0	2	0	1	31	12th
2020	Super Formula	TCS Nakajima Racing	1	0	0	0	0	0	25th
2020	Super Taikyu - ST-TCR	Racer Dome Racing	2	0	0	0	1	77.5‡	4th‡
2021	Super Formula	Red Bull Mugen Team Goh	7	1	1	1	1	38.5	6th
2021	Super GT - GT500	Modulo Nakajima Racing	8	0	1	0	0	5	18th
2022	Super Formula	Docomo Team Dandelion Racing	10	0	0	0	1	33	9th
2022	Super GT - GT500	Modulo Nakajima Racing	8	0	0	0	0	4	15th
2023	Super GT - GT500	ARTA	8	1	1	0	3	53	4th
2023	Super Formula	Team Mugen	1	0	0	0	0	0	24th
2023	Super Formula	TGM Grand Prix	1	0	0	0	0	0	24th
2023	Super Formula	TCS Nakajima Racing	1	0	0	0	0	0	24th
2023	Super Taikyu - ST-Q	Team HRC	6	2	1	1	4	N/A	NC‡
2024	Super GT - GT500	ARTA	8	0	0	0	1	35	12th
2024	Super Formula	TGM Grand Prix	6	0	0	0	0	0	22nd
2024	Super Taikyu - ST-Q	Team HRC	6	0	0	0	3	0	NC
2025	Super GT - GT500	ARTA	8	0	2	1	1	32	8th
2025	Super Taikyu - ST-2	Nihon Automobile College							
2025	Super Taikyu - ST-Q	Team HRC							
2026	Super GT - GT500	Team HRC ARTA Mugen	8	0	1	0	3	49	6th
2026	Super Taikyu - ST-Q	Team HRC							
2026	Super Taikyu - ST-2	Nihon Automobile College							

^{‡} Team standings.
^{*} Season still in progress.

=== Complete F4 Japanese Championship results ===
(key) (Races in bold indicate pole position) (Races in italics indicate fastest lap)

Year	Team	1	2	3	4	5	6	7	8	9	10	11	12	13	14	DC	Pts
2015	Honda Formula Dream Project	OKA; 1; 9	OKA; 2; 3	FUJ1; 1; 4	FUJ1; 2; 11	FUJ2; 1; 2	FUJ2; 2; 4	SUZ; 1; 4	SUZ; 2; 17	SUG; 1; 5	SUG; 2; 7	**AUT**; **1**; 2	AUT; 2; 2	MOT; 1; 3	MOT; 2; 24	3rd	108

=== Complete Japanese Formula 3 Championship results ===
(key) (Races in bold indicate pole position; races in italics indicate fastest lap)

Year	Team	Engine	1	2	3	4	5	6	7	8	9	10	11	12	13	14	15	16	17	18	19	20	DC	Pts
2016	Honda Formula Dream Project	Mugen Honda	SUZ; 1	SUZ; 2	FUJ; 1	FUJ; 2	OKA; 1	OKA; 2	SUZ; 1	SUZ; 2	FUJ; 1	FUJ; 2	MOT; 1	MOT; 2	OKA; 1	OKA; 2	SUG; 1	SUG; 2	SUG; 3				10th	6
2017	Toda Racing	Toda	OKA; 1	OKA; 2	OKA; 3	SUZ; 1	SUZ; 2	FUJ; 1	FUJ; 2	OKA; 1	OKA; 2	SUZ; 1	SUZ; 2	FUJ; 1	FUJ; 2	MOT; 1	MOT; 2	MOT; 3	AUT; 1	AUT; 2	SUG; 1	SUG; 2	5th	64
2019	ThreeBond Racing	Tomei	SUZ; 1; 6	SUZ; 2; 7	AUT; 1; 5	AUT; 2; 5	AUT; 3; 3	OKA; 1; 9	OKA; 2 Ret	OKA; 3; 9	SUG; 1; 4	SUG; 2; 6	FUJ; 1; 2	FUJ; 2; 4	SUG; 1; 9	SUG; 2; 10	SUG; 3; 8	MOT; 1; 4	MOT; 2; 8	MOT; 3; 3	OKA; 1; 4	OKA; 2; 6	6th	36

=== Complete Super GT results ===
Year	Team	Car	Class	1	2	3	4	5	6	7	8	9	DC	Points
2018	Modulo Drago Corse	Honda NSX GT3	GT300	OKA; Ret	FUJ; 8	SUZ; 26	CHA; 9	FUJ; DNS	SUG; 4	AUT; 3	MOT; 14		14th	24
2019	Modulo Drago Corse	Honda NSX GT3 Evo	GT300	OKA; 9†	FUJ; 26	SUZ; 7	CHA; 10	FUJ; 3	AUT; 11	SUG; 13	MOT; 29		17th	19
2020	Modulo Nakajima Racing	Honda NSX-GT	GT500	FUJ; 13	FUJ; 13	**SUZ**; 4	MOT; 10	FUJ; 13	SUZ; 6	**MOT**; 2	FUJ; 11		12th	31
2021	Modulo Nakajima Racing	Honda NSX-GT	GT500	OKA; 13	FUJ; 10	MOT; Ret	**SUZ**; Ret	SUG; 8	AUT; 12	MOT; 13	FUJ; 12		18th	5
2022	Modulo Nakajima Racing	Honda NSX-GT	GT500	OKA; 15	FUJ; 11	SUZ; 11	FUJ; 11	SUZ; 12	SUG; 7	AUT; 13	MOT; 12		15th	4
2023	ARTA	Honda NSX-GT	GT500	OKA; 11	FUJ; 10	SUZ; 7	FUJ; 3	**SUZ**; 1	SUG; 12	**AUT**; 2	MOT; 12		4th	53
2024	ARTA	Honda Civic Type R-GT	GT500	OKA; 9	FUJ; 15	SUZ; 3^{2}	FUJ; 11	SUZ; 10	SUG; 6	AUT; 4	MOT; 5		12th	35
2025	ARTA	Honda Civic Type R-GT	GT500	OKA; Ret	FUJ; 11	SEP; 12	FS1; 13	FS2 (14)	**SUZ**; 4	**SUG**; 4	AUT; 3	MOT; 8	8th	32
2026	Team HRC ARTA Mugen	Honda Prelude-GT	GT500	OKA; 11	FUJ; 11	**FUJ**; 2	SUZ; 3	SUG; 9	AUT; 6	MOT; 3	MOT; 7		6th	49

^{‡} Half points awarded as less than 75% of race distance was completed.
^{(Number)} Driver did not take part in this sprint race, points are still awarded for the teammate's result.
^{*} Season still in progress.

=== Complete Super Formula results ===
(key) (Races in bold indicate pole position) (Races in italics indicate fastest lap)

Year	Team	Engine	1	2	3	4	5	6	7	8	9	10	DC	Points
2020	TCS Nakajima Racing	Honda	MOT	OKA	SUG	AUT	SUZ	SUZ	FUJ; 13				25th	0
2021	Red Bull Mugen Team Goh	Honda	FUJ; 16	SUZ; 5	AUT; 6	SUG; 10	MOT; 10	**MOT**; 1^{1}	SUZ; 5				6th	38.5
2022	Docomo Team Dandelion Racing	Honda	FUJ; 16	FUJ; 7	SUZ; 8	AUT; 9	SUG; 5^{3}	FUJ; 15	MOT; 10	MOT; 13	SUZ; 13	SUZ; 2^{3}	9th	33
2023	Team Mugen	Honda	FUJ	FUJ	SUZ	AUT; 14	SUG						24th	0
2023	TGM Grand Prix	Honda						FUJ; 21†	MOT				24th	0
2023	TCS Nakajima Racing	Honda								SUZ; 17	SUZ; WD		24th	0
2024	TGM Grand Prix	Honda	SUZ	AUT	SUG	FUJ; 14	MOT; 15	FUJ; 19	FUJ; 13	SUZ; Ret	SUZ; Ret		22nd	0

^{*} Season still in progress.

Sporting positions
Preceded by Toshiki Oyu	Super Formula; Rookie Champion; 2021	Succeeded by Ren Sato
