= 2023 Super Formula Championship =

Japanese open wheel motor racing

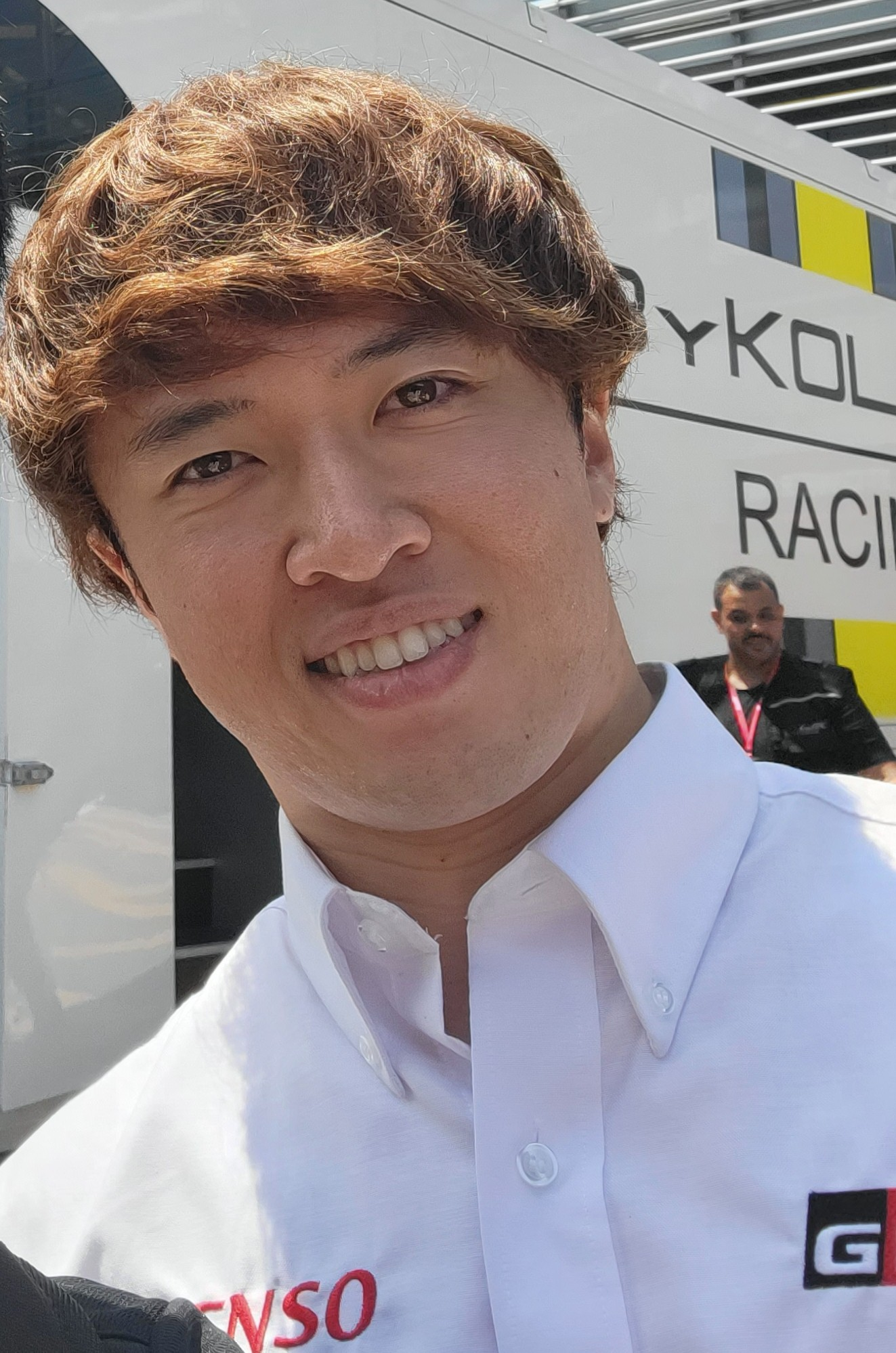
Ritomo Miyata, driving for Vantelin Team TOM'S, won his first Super Formula Championship title.

The 2023 Japanese Super Formula Championship was the fifty-first season of premier Japanese open-wheel motor racing, and the eleventh under the moniker of Super Formula. It started in April 2023 and was contested over seven weekends, comprising nine races. Tomoki Nojiri entered the season as the two-time and defending series champion.

TOM'S driver Ritomo Miyata won the Drivers' Championship at the final race, ahead of Liam Lawson, who became Rookie of the Year while his Mugen Team won the Teams' Championship.

== Teams and drivers ==
All teams used identical Dallara-built SF23 chassis. 2023 was the first season for this new chassis. The SF23 was constructed from Bcomp bio-composite material aimed at reducing carbon dioxide emissions by approximately 75 percent, and featured updated aerodynamic features aimed at reducing turbulent air and promoting more wheel-to-wheel racing. Series tyre supplier Yokohama Rubber debuted a new "carbon neutral racing tyre" made from 33 percent recycled and renewable raw materials. Every Honda-powered car used a Honda HR-417E engine and every Toyota-powered car used a Toyota TRD-01F engine.

Team	Engine	No.	Driver name	Rounds
(Japan) Team Mugen	Honda	1	(Japan) Tomoki Nojiri	1–3, 5–9
(Japan) Team Mugen	Honda	1	(Japan) Hiroki Otsu	4
(Japan) Team Mugen	Honda	15	(New Zealand) Liam Lawson	All
(Japan) Kondo Racing	Toyota	3	(Japan) Kenta Yamashita	All
(Japan) Kondo Racing	Toyota	4	(Japan) Kazuto Kotaka	All
(Japan) Docomo Team Dandelion Racing	Honda	5	(Japan) Tadasuke Makino	All
(Japan) Docomo Team Dandelion Racing	Honda	6	(Japan) Kakunoshin Ohta	All
(Hong Kong) Kids com Team KCMG	Toyota	7	(Japan) Kamui Kobayashi	All
(Hong Kong) Kids com Team KCMG	Toyota	18	(Japan) Yuji Kunimoto	All
(Japan) ThreeBond Racing	Honda	12	(Japan) Nirei Fukuzumi	All
(Japan) docomo business ROOKIE	Toyota	14	(Japan) Kazuya Oshima	All
(Japan) Itochu Enex Team Impul	Toyota	19	(Japan) Yuhi Sekiguchi	All
(Japan) Itochu Enex Team Impul	Toyota	20	(Japan) Ryō Hirakawa	All
(Japan) Vantelin Team TOM’S	Toyota	36	(France) Giuliano Alesi	1–5
(Japan) Vantelin Team TOM’S	Toyota	36	(Japan) Ukyo Sasahara	6–9
(Japan) Vantelin Team TOM’S	Toyota	37	(Japan) Ritomo Miyata	All
(Japan) P.mu/Cerumo・INGING	Toyota	38	(Japan) Sho Tsuboi	All
(Japan) P.mu/Cerumo・INGING	Toyota	39	(Japan) Sena Sakaguchi	All
(Japan) B-Max Racing	Honda	50	(Japan) Nobuharu Matsushita	All
(Japan) B-Max Racing	Honda	51	(United Kingdom) Raoul Hyman (Note: Hyman is a South African driver competing under a British licence.)	All
(Japan) TGM Grand Prix	Honda	53	(Japan) Toshiki Oyu	1–5, 7
(Japan) TGM Grand Prix	Honda	53	(Japan) Hiroki Otsu	6
(Japan) TGM Grand Prix	Honda	53	(Japan) Riki Okusa	8–9
(Japan) TGM Grand Prix	Honda	55	(Turkey) Cem Bölükbaşı	All
(Japan) TCS Nakajima Racing	Honda	64	(Japan) Naoki Yamamoto	1–7
(Japan) TCS Nakajima Racing	Honda	64	(Japan) Hiroki Otsu	8–9
(Japan) TCS Nakajima Racing	Honda	65	(Japan) Ren Sato	All

=== Team changes ===
- KCMG have a new title sponsor with Daycare Kids Com which has been the major sponsor for the team, the team would run under Kids Com Team KCMG.
- Red Bull left Team Goh and moved its sponsorship efforts to Lawson's Team Mugen entry. The loss of this sponsorship left Team Goh in doubts whether they would be able to continue their participation in the championship for 2023. Servus Japan, the organization behind the team, later announced that the team would relaunch as TGM Grand Prix and confirmed that they would run two cars in 2023.
- After two seasons running one car, B-Max Racing expanded to two cars for this season.
- ThreeBond, who have been main sponsors for the Drago Corse team, acquired the team's entry and rebranded as ThreeBond Racing.

=== Driver changes ===
- 2022 Super Formula Lights champion Kazuto Kotaka was promoted to Super Formula as one of Kondō Racing's two drivers. Kotaka, who drove most of the 2021 season for KCMG, replaced Sacha Fenestraz, who left the series to drive for Nissan in Formula E.
- Raoul Hyman was awarded a Honda Super Formula scholarship for winning the 2022 Formula Regional Americas Championship title, and drove for B-Max Racing.
- FIA Formula 2 driver and Red Bull junior Liam Lawson made his Super Formula debut, replacing Ukyo Sasahara at Team Mugen. Sasahara later agreed to become the development driver for Super Formula's Toyota-powered research and development vehicle.
- 2022 Super Formula Lights runner-up Kakunoshin Ohta was promoted to Super Formula and made his debut with Dandelion Racing, replacing Hiroki Otsu, who did not return to the series.
- 2022 Rookie of the Year winner Ren Sato moved to Nakajima Racing to replace Toshiki Oyu. His Team Goh teammate Atsushi Miyake left the series.
- The newly rebranded team TGM Grand Prix signed Toshiki Oyu and rookie Cem Bölükbaşı, who competed in Formula 2 in 2022. Bölükbaşı was the first Turkish driver to race in the series.

=== Mid-season ===
- Tomoki Nojiri was absent from the fourth round at Autopolis after being diagnosed with a pneumothorax. He was replaced by Hiroki Otsu, who came 9th in the standings with Team Dandelion in 2022. Nojiri returned to competition from round five onwards.
- After disappointing results in his second full-time season, Team TOM'S decided to replace Giuliano Alesi after round 5. His seat was filled by Ukyo Sasahara, who came sixth in 2022 driving for Team Mugen.
- Toshiki Oyu suffered from a broken collarbone during training ahead of round 6. Hiroki Otsu once again stepped in as a replacement driver.
- After suffering a heavy crash in the Super GT race at Sportsland SUGO, Naoki Yamamoto was diagnosed with a damaged vertebrae and spinal cord. He missed the Suzuka double-header during his recovery. Hiroki Otsu was the replacement driver for the third time this season.
- Ahead of the final Suzuka weekend, TGM Grand Prix announced that Toshiki Oyu would not be competing in the double-header, with Riki Okusa as the replacement driver making his Super Formula debut.

== Race calendar ==
The provisional calendar was announced on 8 August 2022. After three weekends were made to double-header events in 2022, the season opener and finale were both announced to have two races again.

Round	Circuit	Location	Date	Support bill	Map
1	Fuji Speedway	Oyama, Shizuoka	8 April	Ferrari Challenge Japan; Honda N-One Owner's Cup	2023 Super Formula Championship is located in Japan
2	Fuji Speedway	Oyama, Shizuoka	9 April	Ferrari Challenge Japan; Honda N-One Owner's Cup	2023 Super Formula Championship is located in Japan
3	Suzuka International Racing Course	Suzuka, Mie	23 April	All-Japan Road Racing Championship JSB1000	2023 Super Formula Championship is located in Japan
4	Autopolis	Hita, Oita	21 May	Super Formula Lights; Honda N-One Owner's Cup	2023 Super Formula Championship is located in Japan
5	Sportsland SUGO	Shibata, Miyagi	18 June	Super Formula Lights; Legend Cars Japan	2023 Super Formula Championship is located in Japan
6	Fuji Speedway	Oyama, Shizuoka	16 July	Lamborghini Super Trofeo Asia	2023 Super Formula Championship is located in Japan
7	Mobility Resort Motegi	Motegi, Tochigi	20 August	TCR Japan Touring Car Series	2023 Super Formula Championship is located in Japan
8	Suzuka International Racing Course	Suzuka, Mie	28 October	Honda N-One Owner's Cup; Toyota 86 Racing Series	2023 Super Formula Championship is located in Japan
9	Suzuka International Racing Course	Suzuka, Mie	29 October	Honda N-One Owner's Cup; Toyota 86 Racing Series	2023 Super Formula Championship is located in Japan

== Race results ==
Round	Circuit	Pole position	Fastest lap	Winning driver	Winning team
1	Fuji Speedway	(Japan) Tomoki Nojiri	(New Zealand) Liam Lawson	(New Zealand) Liam Lawson	(Japan) Team Mugen
2	Fuji Speedway	(Japan) Tomoki Nojiri	(Japan) Toshiki Oyu	(Japan) Tomoki Nojiri	(Japan) Team Mugen
3	Suzuka International Racing Course	(Japan) Toshiki Oyu	(Japan) Ritomo Miyata	(Japan) Ritomo Miyata	(Japan) Vantelin Team TOM’S
4	Autopolis	(Japan) Sho Tsuboi	(Japan) Sho Tsuboi	(New Zealand) Liam Lawson	(Japan) Team Mugen
5	Sportsland SUGO	(Japan) Toshiki Oyu	(New Zealand) Liam Lawson	(Japan) Ritomo Miyata	(Japan) Vantelin Team TOM’S
6	Fuji Speedway	(Japan) Tadasuke Makino	(Japan) Ryō Hirakawa	(New Zealand) Liam Lawson	(Japan) Team Mugen
7	Mobility Resort Motegi	(Japan) Tomoki Nojiri	(Japan) Ryō Hirakawa	(Japan) Tomoki Nojiri	(Japan) Team Mugen
8	Suzuka International Racing Course	(Japan) Tomoki Nojiri	(Japan) Ritomo Miyata	(Japan) Tomoki Nojiri	(Japan) Team Mugen
9	Suzuka International Racing Course	(New Zealand) Liam Lawson	(Japan) Yuhi Sekiguchi	(Japan) Kakunoshin Ohta	(Japan) Docomo Team Dandelion Racing

== Season report ==
=== First half ===
The 2023 Super Formula Championship began with a double-header at Fuji Speedway. Mugen's defending champion Tomoki Nojiri took pole position for the first race. His debuting teammate Liam Lawson started third, with the TGM of Toshiki Oyu between them until Lawson moved up into second. He then pitted on lap 21, with Nojiri following one lap later. A slightly quicker stop for Lawson together with his tyres already being up to temperature meant he took the lead. Lawson then built a gap and became the first driver to win on debut in Super Formula history. The podium was completed by Impul's Ryō Hirakawa, who had started seventh and pitted late in the race to climb up the order, but a late safety car meant the race finished under caution, so he was unable to make full use of his new tyres.

Nojiri also took pole position for the second race of the weekend, but a great start by Oyu saw him take the lead into turn three. Most cars pitted shortly after a safety car on lap ten, where Nojiri profited of his pit box position as Oyu had to let him by before being allowed back into the fast lane. Oyu tried once to retake the lead, but then struggled for pace, allowing INGING's Sho Tsuboi to take second place, before dropping further down and finishing last. Lawson initially finished third, but was hit with a five-second time penalty for holding up other cars when he tried building a gap to Nojiri at the pit entry when Mugen double-stacked their cars. This promoted Kondō's Kenta Yamashita onto his first podium in three years. Nojiri left Fuji as the championship leader, 14 points ahead of his teammate Lawson.

Next came the season's first visit to Suzuka, where Oyu claimed pole position. He held on to his lead as Lawson moved from eighth on the grid into fourth, and then past Nojiri into third. Most of the leaders then pitted, but Oyu waited until lap 19, resulting in him coming out directly in front of Nojiri. The pair fought through the opening corners, before Nojiri rear-ended Oyu, forcing both cars into retirement. TOM'S driver Ritomo Miyata and Hirakawa stopped under the ensuing safety car, thereby coming out third and fourth. Their fresher tyres allowed them to take the fight to the leaders, with Miyata eventually ending up in the lead and winning the race ahead of Tsuboi, and Hirakawa passing Lawson for third. Nojiri still maintained his championship lead, but now Miyata was second, four points behind.

The fourth round at Autopolis began with Tsuboi on pole position. Lawson in second initially lost position to INGING's Sena Sakaguchi, but stopped earlier than the other frontrunners, which allowed him to get past both INGING cars. Miyata was the only other frontrunner yet to pit and did so as Oyu and Sakaguchi crashed to bring out a timely safety car. Lawson and Tsuboi were both still able to stay in front of Miyata, but Lawson had by far the oldest tyres. A perfect restart allowed him to build a gap as Miyata tried to get past Tsuboi. He did so with three laps to go, but by then Lawson was far enough ahead to secure the win. Nojiri had to miss the weekend due to a pneumothorax, allowing Lawson to take the standings lead, four points from Miyata, with Tsuboi a further seven points behind.

Oyu took another pole position a month later at Sportsland Sugo. He led Miyata at the start as Tsuboi and Lawson slotted in behind them. Oyu then started struggling for pace, allowing Miyata to take the lead on lap twelve. Tsuboi followed through as Oyu lost control of his car and crashed. Split strategies meant some drivers stopped early and other stayed out, with the former strategy clearly materializing to be the better one: Dandelion's Tadasuke Makino was the first driver to pit, which saw him take third place. Miyata and Nojiri also stopped early and ended the race first and second, while Tsuboi and Lawson were among the last cars to stop, having stayed out hoping for another safety car. Both unable to make the podium, while Miyata's win saw him take a twelve-point championship lead over Lawson.

=== Second half ===
The championship returned to Fuji Speedway to kick off the second half of the season. Makino beat Lawson to pole position and kept his lead at the start. Lawson pressured Makino, but was unable to pass him on the road. He then pitted a lap earlier than the leader and once again used his warmed up tyres to take first place, just as he did against Nojiri in the first race of the season. As the race stayed green until the end, the drivers who delayed their stop, led by KCMG's Naoki Yamamoto, were also no problem for him. In the end, he had built a four-second gap and won comfortably. Miyata had started fifth and passed Nakajima Racing's Ren Sato for third on lap 31 to hold on to his championship lead by a single point. Nojiri only came eighth, and Tsuboi failed to finish inside the points.

Mobility Resort Motegi played host for round seven, and Nojiri was back on pole position. Dandelion's Kakunoshin Ohta qualified second, but stalled at the start. This saw Lawson aggressively challenge Nojiri for the lead into turn two, with the New Zealander running wide over the kerbs, spinning across the track, hitting Makino and Impul's Yuhi Sekiguchi and sending both cars airborne. A red flag interruption followed, with Makino being airlifted to hospital. He was able to avoid major injuries. After the restart, the race remained relatively uneventful, with Nojiri leading the pack home after a slow pitstop cost his nearest challenger Hirakawa any chance of victory. Oyu came third, while Miyata in fourth retook the championship lead. Lawson's car was repaired during the stoppage, but he could only manage 13th place and now trailed Miyata by eight points.

The final double header at Suzuka began with Nojiri taking a crucial pole position to earn three more points and move past Lawson, who could only qualify seventh. The race began with Ohta moving past Makino for third, before being stopped for a massive crash between Sasahara and Nakajima Racing's Hiroki Otsu into 130R. Otsu was trying to move down the inside of Sasahara, which resulted in both cars hitting the barrier at high speed. Sasahara's car was flung into the catch fence, which tore the car in half. The chassis landed on the other side of the track near Degner 1. Both drivers miraculously avoided grave injuries, although Sasahara suffered a concussion. The damage to the barriers was to severe to restart the race and half points were awarded. This saw Lawson drop further back in the title fight, while Nojiri closed up to 6.5 points behind Miyata.

Lawson took pole position for the final race of the season to minimize his gap to Miyata to twelve points. The odds still remained stacked against him, even more so after he lost the lead to Ohta at the start. Miyata moved into third, capitalizing on Nojiri losing momentum after also trying to move past Lawson. Miyata put pressure on Lawson, but knew he would not have to force the move to take the title. Ohta pitted later than his rivals, came out in front and spent the rest of the race fending off Lawson before eventually taking his maiden win. Miyata came home three seconds behind Lawson, his third place more than enough to secure his first Super Formula title. Nojiri could only manage fourth after a longer first stint waiting for a safety car and therefore lost second in the standings to Lawson by half a point.

Miyata drew focus from the Nojiri-Lawson rivalry, and earned strong points with which the TOM'S driver took the title. Still, Lawson had a strong rookie campaign, tackling most obstacles with relative ease—were it not for the overambitious move on Nojiri in Motegi that would prove critical in his title campaign. Notably, Nojiri had to fight not only on-track, but also off-track, as he had to recover from the pneumothorax that cost him the chance to compete at Autopolis. Considering his physical condition, Nojiri had a remarkable season and came close to a third successive title.

== Championship standings ==
Race points

Position	**1st**	**2nd**	**3rd**	**4th**	**5th**	**6th**	**7th**	**8th**	**9th**	**10th**
Points	20	15	11	8	6	5	4	3	2	1

Qualifying points

Position	**1st**	**2nd**	**3rd**
Points	3	2	1

=== Drivers' championship ===
Pos	Driver	FUJ1		SUZ1	AUT	SUG	FUJ2	MOT	SUZ2 (Note: The First race for round 8 was stopped due to a huge crash and wasn't resumed. Due to less than 75% of laps being completed, half points were awarded.)		Points
1	(Japan) Ritomo Miyata	5^{2}	4^{2}	1	2	1^{2}	3	4	2^{2}	3	114.5
2	(New Zealand) Liam Lawson	1^{3}	5	4	1^{2}	5	1^{2}	13^{3}	6	**2**^{1}	106.5
3	(Japan) Tomoki Nojiri	**2**^{1}	**1**^{1}	Ret^{3}		2^{3}	8	**1**^{1}	**1**^{1}	4^{3}	106
4	(Japan) Sho Tsuboi	Ret	2	2^{2}	**3**^{1}	7	11	Ret	5	5	59
5	(Japan) Ryō Hirakawa	3	21†	3	5	11	4	2	7	6	58
6	(Japan) Tadasuke Makino	14	8	15	6	3	**2**^{1}	Ret	4^{3}	10	43
7	(Japan) Kakunoshin Ohta	15	19	17	16	15	6^{3}	Ret^{2}	3	1^{2}	35.5
8	(Japan) Kenta Yamashita	Ret	3	5	4	8	17	9	11	9	32
9	(Japan) Toshiki Oyu	7	20^{3}	**Ret**^{1}	Ret	**Ret**^{1}		3			22
10	(Japan) Ren Sato	6	9	DNS	7	12	5	16	10	Ret	17.5
11	(Japan) Kamui Kobayashi	Ret	6	14	11	6	9	7	8	17	17.5
12	(Japan) Sena Sakaguchi	17	10	6	Ret^{3}	10	10	5	14	11	15
13	(Japan) Naoki Yamamoto	4	15	11	9	13	7	Ret			14
14	(Japan) Kazuya Oshima	9	11	13	12	4	12	8	19	14	13
15	(Japan) Kazuto Kotaka	10	14	7	19	14	14	6	15	12	10
16	(Japan) Nirei Fukuzumi	Ret	7	10	8	16	16	14	9	Ret	9
17	(Japan) Yuji Kunimoto	12	16	16	10	9	15	10	16	8	7
18	(Turkey) Cem Bölükbaşı	8	17	9	15	17	18	11	20	15	5
19	(Japan) Nobuharu Matsushita	13	12	12	Ret	Ret	13	Ret	13	7	4
20	(France) Giuliano Alesi	Ret	Ret	8	13	Ret					3
21	(Japan) Yuhi Sekiguchi	11	13	19	18	Ret	20	Ret	12	16	0
22	(Japan) Ukyo Sasahara						19	12	22	WD	0
23	(Japan) Riki Okusa								18	13	0
24	(Japan) Hiroki Otsu				14		21†		17	WD	0
25	(United Kingdom) Raoul Hyman	16	18	18	17	18	Ret	15	21	18	0
Pos	Driver	FUJ1		SUZ1	AUT	SUG	FUJ2	MOT	SUZ2		Points

Key
Colour	Result
Gold	Winner
Silver	Second place
Bronze	Third place
Green	Other points position
Blue	Other classified position
Blue	Not classified, finished (NC)
Purple	Not classified, retired (Ret)
Red	Did not qualify (DNQ)
Red	Did not pre-qualify (DNPQ)
Black	Disqualified (DSQ)
White	Did not start (DNS)
White	Race cancelled (C)
Blank	Did not practice (DNP)
Blank	Excluded (EX)
Blank	Did not arrive (DNA)
Blank	Withdrawn (WD)
Blank	Did not enter (cell empty)
Text formatting	Meaning
**Bold**	Pole position
Italics	Fastest lap

=== Teams' championship ===
Pos	Team	FUJ1		SUZ1	AUT	SUG	FUJ2	MOT	SUZ2		Points
1	(Japan) Team Mugen	1	1	4	1	2	1	1	1	2	188.5
1	(Japan) Team Mugen	2	5	Ret	14	5	8	13	6	4	188.5
2	(Japan) Vantelin Team TOM’S	5	4	1	2	1	3	4	2	3	109.5
2	(Japan) Vantelin Team TOM’S	Ret	Ret	8	13	Ret	19	12	22	WD	109.5
3	(Japan) Docomo Team Dandelion Racing	14	8	15	6	3	2	Ret	3	1	69.5
3	(Japan) Docomo Team Dandelion Racing	15	19	17	16	15	6	Ret	4	10	69.5
4	(Japan) P.mu/Cerumo・INGING	Ret	2	2	3	7	10	5	5	5	68
4	(Japan) P.mu/Cerumo・INGING	Ret	10	6	Ret	10	11	Ret	14	11	68
5	(Japan) Itochu Enex Team Impul	3	13	3	5	11	4	2	7	6	58
5	(Japan) Itochu Enex Team Impul	11	21†	19	18	Ret	20	Ret	12	16	58
6	(Japan) Kondo Racing	10	3	5	4	8	14	6	11	9	42
6	(Japan) Kondo Racing	Ret	14	7	19	14	17	9	15	12	42
7	(Japan) TCS Nakajima Racing	4	9	11	7	12	5	16	10	Ret	31.5
7	(Japan) TCS Nakajima Racing	6	15	DNS	9	13	7	Ret	17	WD	31.5
8	(Hong Kong) Kids com Team KCMG	12	6	14	10	6	10	7	8	8	24.5
8	(Hong Kong) Kids com Team KCMG	Ret	16	16	11	9	15	10	16	17	24.5
9	(Japan) TGM Grand Prix	7	17	9	15	17	18	3	18	13	20
9	(Japan) TGM Grand Prix	8	20	Ret	Ret	Ret	21†	11	20	15	20
10	(Japan) docomo business ROOKIE	9	11	13	12	4	12	8	19	14	13
11	(Japan) ThreeBond Racing	Ret	7	10	8	16	16	14	9	Ret	9
12	(Japan) B-Max Racing	13	12	12	17	18	13	15	13	7	4
12	(Japan) B-Max Racing	16	18	18	Ret	Ret	Ret	Ret	21	18	4
Pos	Team	FUJ1		SUZ1	AUT	SUG	FUJ2	MOT	SUZ2		Points
