= Rookie Racing =

Japanese racing team

(Japan) Rookie Racing
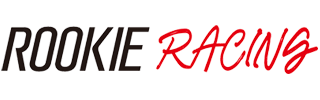
- Founded: 2017
- Base: Oyama, Shizuoka Prefecture
- Team principal(s): Akio Toyoda
- Current series: Super GT; Super Formula; Super Taikyu; Kyojo Cup
- Current drivers: Super GT - GT500: Kazuya Oshima; Nirei Fukuzumi; Super GT - GT300: Hiroaki Ishiura; Tokiya Suzuki; Super Formula: Nirei Fukuzumi; Super Taikyu ST-Q: "Morizo" (Akio Toyoda); Daisuke Toyoda; Hiroaki Ishiura; Kazuya Oshima
- Teams' Championships: Super Taikyu ST-1: 2020 Super Taikyu Series; Super Taikyu ST-X: 2023 Super Taikyu Series; 2024 Super Taikyu Series
- Drivers' Championships: Super Taikyu ST-1: 2020 Super Taikyu Series; Super Taikyu ST-X: 2023 Super Taikyu Series; 2024 Super Taikyu Series
- Website: www.rookie-racing.co.jp

Rookie Racing Co., Ltd. (stylized as ROOKIE Racing) is a Japanese racing team that competes in Super Formula, Super GT, and Super Taikyu. Rookie Racing is a sister team of Toyota Gazoo Racing and based close to Fuji Speedway.

== History ==
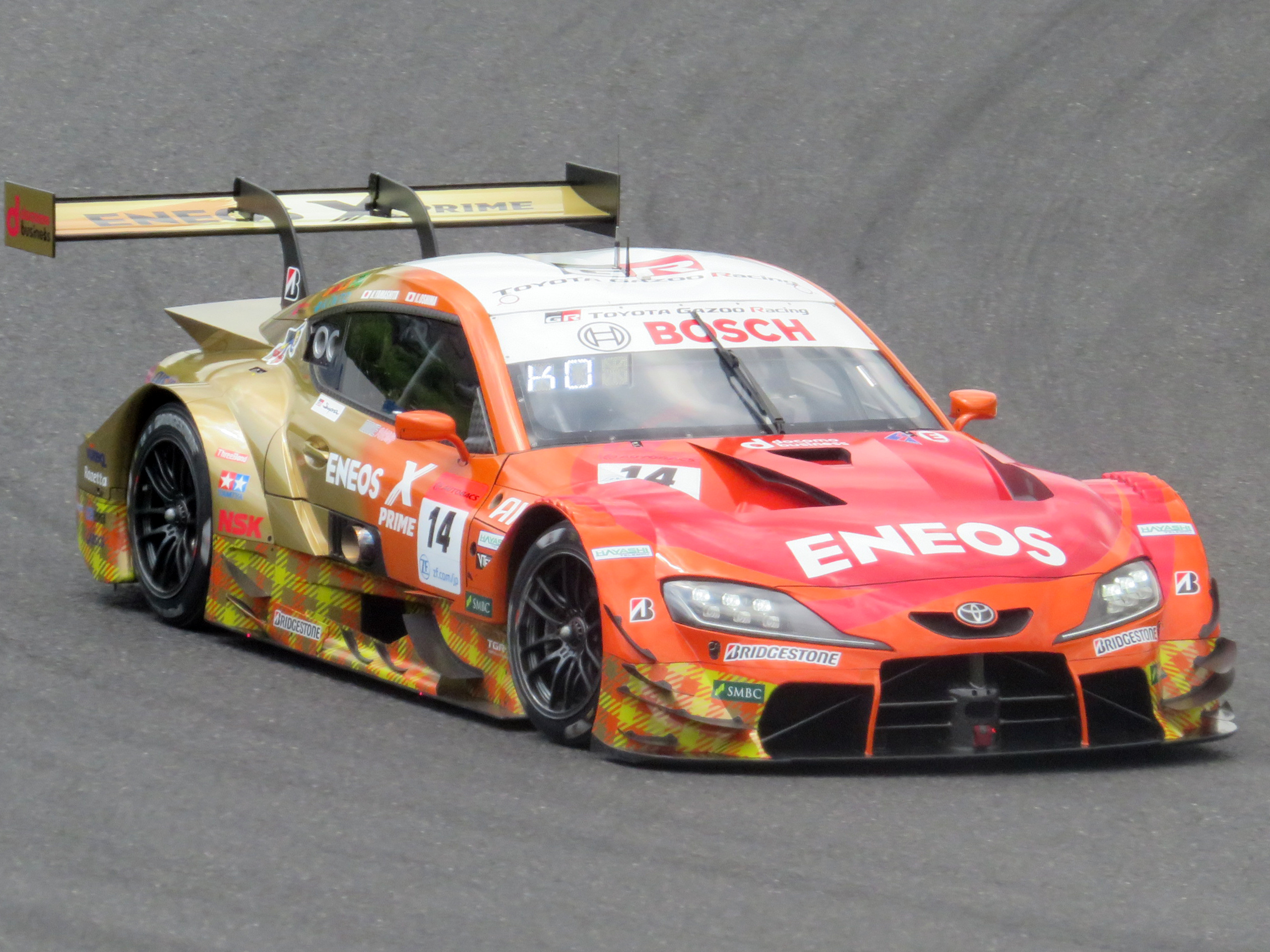
ENEOS X PRIME GR Supra at 2022 Takanoko no Hotel Suzuka GT 300km

In 2017, Tatsuya Kataoka launched a private team "T's Concept" for the purpose of training young and gentleman drivers. T's Concept participated in the Super Taikyu ST-4 class with two Toyota 86's sponsored by Ogura Clutch. Drivers such as Ogura Clutch's President Yasuhiro Ogura and Miki Koyama competed with T's Concept on the team's inaugural season on Super Taikyu. T's Concept continued to field two cars for the 2018 season and signed Masahiro Sasaki to compete alongside Ogura in the #29 team while Tohjiro Azuma and Daisuke Matsunaga competed in the #28 team. One of the T's Concept cars was later rebranded into "ROOKIE Racing" in 2019 with Daisuke Toyoda, son of Toyota president Akio, and former GT500 champion Akira Iida joining the team as Rookie's lead drivers in the 2019 Super Taikyu season.

In 2020, Akio Toyoda purchased the team in its entirety and entered both Super Formula and Super GT after Team LeMans left from both series at the end of the 2019 season. While the team had previously entered rookie drivers that was part of the Toyota Young Driver Programme, Rookie's name was taken from Akio's pet dog "Rookie". In the team's first year on Super GT, Rookie's entry was run as part of Team Cerumo. Kazuya Oshima drove in both the Super Formula and Super GT championship with Sho Tsuboi acting as Oshima's teammate in Super GT. In 2021, Rookie took full charge of the team from Cerumo. Oshima stayed with the team, competing in both series and was paired up with Kenta Yamashita for 2021 Super GT season. For 2022, the team set up a new factory base close to Fuji Speedway.

In the 2026 Super GT Series, Rookie Racing expanded into the GT300 class by entering a Mercedes-AMG GT3 Evo with drivers Hiroaki Ishiura and Tokiya Suzuki. Suzuki, however, missed the second round after his car license was suspended, with two time FIA WEC champion Kamui Kobayashi replacing him for that race.

Rookie is set to be one of the first four factory-backed teams to run the Toyota GR GT3 in 2027, both in Super GT GT300 and at the Nürburgring 24 Hours as part of a two-pronged approach alongside KCMG.

== Race results ==
=== Complete Super GT results ===
(key) (Races in bold indicate pole position) (Races in italics indicate fastest lap)

Year	Car	Tyres	Class	No.	Drivers	1	2	3	4	5	6	7	8	9	Pos	Points
2020	Toyota GR Supra GT500	B	GT500	14	(Japan) Kazuya Oshima (Japan) Sho Tsuboi	FUJ; 3	FUJ; 3	SUZ; 9	MOT; 4	FUJ; 2	SUZ; 12	MOT; 12	FUJ; Ret		7th	47
2021	Toyota GR Supra GT500	B	GT500	14	(Japan) Kazuya Oshima (Japan) Kenta Yamashita	**OKA**; 1	FUJ; 2	MOT; 13	SUZ; 12	SUG; 12†	AUT; 11	MOT; 6	**FUJ**; 3		5th	52
2022	Toyota GR Supra GT500	B	GT500	14	(Japan) Kazuya Oshima (Japan) Kenta Yamashita	**OKA**; 1	FUJ; 7‡	SUZ; 8	FUJ; 7	SUZ; 14	SUG; 11	AUT; 4	MOT; 3		5th	49
2023	Toyota GR Supra GT500	B	GT500	14	(Japan) Kazuya Oshima (Japan) Kenta Yamashita	OKA; 4	FUJ; 4	SUZ; 6	FUJ; 11	SUZ; 3	SUG; 6	AUT; 8	MOT; 6		7th	45
2024	Toyota GR Supra GT500	B	GT500	14	(Japan) Kazuya Oshima (Japan) Nirei Fukuzumi	OKA; NC	FUJ; 8	SUZ; 2	FUJ; 4	SUZ; 9^{2}	SUG; 9^{3}	AUT; 13†	MOT; 6^{3}		11th	38
2025	Toyota GR Supra GT500	B	GT500	14	(Japan) Kazuya Oshima (Japan) Nirei Fukuzumi	OKA; 2	FUJ; 6	SEP; 9	FUJ; Ret	**FUJ**; 1	SUZ; 2	SUG; 7	AUT; 9	MOT; 14	4th	54.5
2026	Toyota GR Supra GT500	B	GT500	14	(Japan) Kazuya Oshima (Japan) Nirei Fukuzumi	OKA; 4	FUJ; 2	FUJ; 7	SUZ; 8	SUG	AUT	MOT			TBD	—
2026	Mercedes-AMG GT3 Evo	B	GT300	32	(Japan) Hiroaki Ishiura (Japan) Tokiya Suzuki (Japan) Kamui Kobayashi	OKA; 16	FUJ; 6	FUJ; 2	SUZ; 10	SUG	AUT	MOT			TBD	—

^{‡} Half points awarded as less than 75% of race distance was completed.
^{*} Season still in progress.

=== Complete Super Formula results ===
Year	Driver	1	2	3	4	5	6	7	8	9	10	11	12 (Note: Postponed second race of the penultimate race weekend of the season.)	13	DC	Pts
2020	(Japan) Kazuya Oshima	MOT; 10	OKA; 16	SUG; 9	AUT; 17	SUZ; 12	SUZ; 9	FUJ; 14							19th	5
2021	(Japan) Kazuya Oshima	FUJ; 10	SUZ1; 15	AUT; 8	SUG; 18	MOT1; Ret	MOT2; 11	SUZ2; 17							19th	2.5
2022	(Japan) Kazuya Oshima	FUJ; 15	FUJ; 18	SUZ; 19	AUT; 15	SUG; 14	FUJ; 13	MOT; 17	MOT; 18	SUZ; 19	SUZ; 15				21st	0
2023	(Japan) Kazuya Oshima	FUJ; 9	FUJ; 11	SUZ; 13	AUT; 12	SUG; 4	FUJ; 12	MOT; 8	SUZ; 19	SUZ; 14					14th	13
2024	(Japan) Kazuya Oshima	SUZ; 13	AUT; 11	SUG; Ret	FUJ; 16	MOT; 14	FUJ; 15	FUJ; Ret	SUZ; Ret	SUZ; 15					19th	0
2025	(Japan) Kazuya Oshima	SUZ; 13	SUZ; 10	MOT; 10	MOT; 6	AUT; 15	FUJ; 6	FUJ; 10	SUG; 18	FUJ; 16	FUJ; C	SUZ; 6	SUZ; 10	SUZ; 18	14th	19
2026	(Japan) Nirei Fukuzumi	MOT	MOT	AUT	SUZ	SUZ	FUJ	FUJ	SUG	FUJ	FUJ	SUZ	SUZ		TBD	—

^{*} Season still in progress.
