= 2020 Super Formula Championship =

Motorsport championship

The 2020 Japanese Super Formula Championship was the forty-eighth season of premier Japanese open-wheel motor racing, and the eighth under the moniker of Super Formula.

== Teams and drivers ==
Every Honda-powered car used a Honda HR-414E engine and every Toyota-powered car used a Toyota RI4A engine.

Team	Engine	No.	Driver	Rounds
(Japan) Vantelin Team TOM’S	Toyota	1	(New Zealand) Nick Cassidy	All
(Japan) Vantelin Team TOM’S	Toyota	36	(Japan) Kazuki Nakajima	1, 3, 5–7
(Japan) Vantelin Team TOM’S	Toyota	36	(Japan) Ritomo Miyata	2, 4
(Japan) Kondo Racing	Toyota	3	(Japan) Kenta Yamashita	1, 3–7
(Japan) Kondo Racing	Toyota	3	(Japan) Sena Sakaguchi	2
(Japan) Kondo Racing	Toyota	4	(France) Sacha Fenestraz	All
(Japan) Docomo Team Dandelion Racing	Honda	5	(Japan) Naoki Yamamoto	All
(Japan) Docomo Team Dandelion Racing	Honda	6	(Japan) Nirei Fukuzumi	All
(Hong Kong) carrozzeria Team KCMG	Toyota	7	(Japan) Kamui Kobayashi	1, 3, 5–7
(Hong Kong) carrozzeria Team KCMG	Toyota	7	(Japan) Yuichi Nakayama	2, 4
(Hong Kong) carrozzeria Team KCMG	Toyota	18	(Japan) Yuji Kunimoto	All
(Japan) Drago Corse with ThreeBond	Honda	12	(Colombia) Tatiana Calderón	1, 4–7
(Japan) Drago Corse with ThreeBond	Honda	12	(Japan) Koudai Tsukakoshi	2–3
(Japan) ROOKIE Racing	Toyota	14	(Japan) Kazuya Oshima	All
(Japan) JMS P.mu/Cerumo・INGING	Toyota	38	(Japan) Hiroaki Ishiura	All
(Japan) JMS P.mu/Cerumo・INGING	Toyota	39	(Japan) Sho Tsuboi	All
(Japan) Team Mugen	Honda	15	(Japan) Ukyo Sasahara	All
(Japan) Team Mugen	Honda	16	(Japan) Tomoki Nojiri	All
(Japan) Itochu Enex Team Impul	Toyota	19	(Japan) Yuhi Sekiguchi	All
(Japan) Itochu Enex Team Impul	Toyota	20	(Japan) Ryō Hirakawa	All
(Japan) Buzz Racing with B-MAX	Honda	50	(Japan) Teppei Natori	1
(Japan) Buzz Racing with B-MAX	Honda	50	(Japan) Mitsunori Takaboshi	2
(Japan) Buzz Racing with B-MAX	Honda	50	(Brazil) Sérgio Sette Câmara	3
(Japan) Buzz Racing with B-MAX	Honda	50	(Japan) Nobuharu Matsushita	4–7
(Japan) Buzz Racing with B-MAX	Honda	51	(France) Charles Milesi	4–7
(Japan) TCS Nakajima Racing	Honda	64	(Japan) Tadasuke Makino	1–6
(Japan) TCS Nakajima Racing	Honda	64	(Japan) Hiroki Otsu	7
(Japan) TCS Nakajima Racing	Honda	65	(Japan) Toshiki Oyu	All

=== Team changes ===
- Ryo Michigami's Drago Corse returns to the championship in partnership with ThreeBond. This marks the team's first appearance in the championship since 2016.
- Team LeMans left the championship at the end of 2019. This means that 2020 was the first season since 1988 where Team LeMans was not represented. Their place was filled by KCMG and Cerumo Motorsport which both added one car each. Cerumo's third car was entered as ROOKIE Racing.
- Real Racing announced it has withdrawn from the 2020 season.

=== Driver changes ===
- Tatiana Calderón moves to the revived Drago Corse team from the FIA Formula 2 Championship, becoming the first female driver in the current Super Formula era and the first in top level Japanese open-wheel racing since Ireland's Sarah Kavanagh entered two races in the 1997 Formula Nippon Championship.
- Jüri Vips was scheduled to contest the full season with Team Mugen, having joined the team at the final round of the 2019 Championship as a replacement for Patricio O'Ward. Vips missed the opening rounds at Motegi and Okayama due to his participation in the FIA Formula 2 Championship, and was replaced by Ukyo Sasahara on both occasions. Pandemic-related travel issues further prevented Vips from arriving in Japan, so Sasahara again filled in at Sportsland Sugo. Ahead of the fourth round at Autopolis, it was announced that Sasahara would keep the seat for the remainder of the season.
- Pietro Fittipaldi was initially confirmed in the #50 B-MAX entry. Fittipaldi had previously competed in the first round of the 2018 Championship before an injury prevented his return. However, on the eve of a pre-season test at Fuji Speedway, it was announced that Sérgio Sette Câmara would instead occupy the seat, in what was described as a "late reshuffle of race seats due to conflicting sponsors' interests". Sette Câmara will be joined by Charles Milesi, who moves up from the Japanese Formula 3 Championship. B-Max's 2019 drivers Lucas Auer and Harrison Newey left the series, both moving to the DTM with BMW and Audi respectively. Neither driver raced at Motegi with Teppei Natori driving the sole B-Max Dallara.
- Alex Palou left Nakajima Racing to move to IndyCar with Dale Coyne Racing. He was replaced by Japanese F3 and Euroformula Open race winner Toshiki Oyu.
- 2019 Japanese Formula 3 Champion Sacha Fenestraz replaces Yuji Kunimoto at Kondo Racing. Kunimoto will drive the newly acquired second car at Team KCMG.
- Following the departure of Team LeMans, Kazuya Oshima moved to the new ROOKIE Racing entry.

==== Mid-season changes ====
- Sergio Sette Câmara, and Charles Milesi unable to travel to Japan for the season opener due to Japan's COVID-19 travel restrictions. B-Max have to run one car for the opening season with Teppei Natori as the driver choice for the number 50 car, and recruited Mitsunori Takaboshi for the second round.
- Tatiana Calderón, Kamui Kobayashi, Kazuki Nakajima, Kenta Yamashita, unable to compete for the second round of the season due to quarantine time after they participated in the 2020 24 Hours of Le Mans. Koudai Tsukakoshi, Yuichi Nakayama, Ritomo Miyata, Sena Sakaguchi covers for them respectively.
- Miyata, and Nakayama returns to compete in the fourth round as Kobayashi, and Nakajima unavailable due to FIA World Endurance Championship commitment.
- Charles Milesi able to compete in the series from the fourth round onwards, and Nobuharu Matsushita takes over Sette Câmara's seat for the remainder of the season.
- Tadasuke Makino have to miss the last round of the season after suffered meningitis. Hiroki Otsu replaces Makino.

== Race calendar ==
The provisional calendar with seven rounds was announced in July 2019. However, in September 2019 the calendar was updated to have the Suzuka Circuit as the first round rather than the Fuji Speedway. The final round at Suzuka Circuit was pushed back 2 weeks to avoid a schedule conflict with the FIA World Endurance Championship, which competes at Fuji Speedway on 1 November. After multiple postponements due to the COVID-19 pandemic, a revised calendar was announced on 9 June 2020 that now sees the season starting in August and running until December.

Round	Circuit	Date
1	Twin Ring Motegi	30 August
2	Okayama International Circuit	27 September
3	Sportsland SUGO	18 October
4	Autopolis	15 November
5	Suzuka Circuit	5 December
6	Suzuka Circuit	6 December
7	Fuji Speedway	20 December

- On 2 March 2020, the season opener at Suzuka Circuit was postponed due to the coronavirus pandemic. On 7 April 2020, it was announced that the season finale would become a double-header, effectively reestablishing the second round at Suzuka.
- The rounds at Fuji Speedway and Autopolis were postponed on 18 March 2020 and 31 March 2020 respectively, both also because of the virus.
- On 24 April 2020, the former fourth round at Sportsland SUGO was also postponed to a so far unannounced date because of the ongoing pandemic.

== Results ==
=== Season summary ===
Round	Circuit	Pole position	Fastest lap	Winning driver	Winning team
1	Twin Ring Motegi	(Japan) Ryō Hirakawa	(Japan) Kamui Kobayashi	(Japan) Ryō Hirakawa	Itochu Enex Team Impul
2	Okayama International Circuit	(Japan) Ryō Hirakawa	(New Zealand) Nick Cassidy	(Japan) Sho Tsuboi	JMS P.mu/Cerumo・INGING
3	Sportsland SUGO	(Brazil) Sérgio Sette Câmara	(New Zealand) Nick Cassidy	(New Zealand) Nick Cassidy	Vantelin Team TOM’S
4	Autopolis	(Japan) Tomoki Nojiri	(Japan) Naoki Yamamoto	(Japan) Tomoki Nojiri	Team Mugen
5	Suzuka Circuit I	(Japan) Naoki Yamamoto	(Japan) Naoki Yamamoto	(Japan) Naoki Yamamoto	Docomo Team Dandelion Racing
6	Suzuka Circuit II	(New Zealand) Nick Cassidy	(Japan) Nirei Fukuzumi	(Japan) Toshiki Oyu	TCS Nakajima Racing
7	Fuji Speedway	(Japan) Tomoki Nojiri	(Japan) Nirei Fukuzumi	(Japan) Sho Tsuboi	JMS P.mu/Cerumo・INGING

== Championship standings ==
=== Scoring system ===
For the 2020 season, the points system has been overhauled to be more in-line with Super GT. The final points standings only include the five best results. Additionally, bonus points are no longer available for the final race of the season. Points are also given to the top three drivers of qualifying as opposed to just points for pole position. Note that these qualifying points do not count towards the teams' championship.

Race points

Position	**1st**	**2nd**	**3rd**	**4th**	**5th**	**6th**	**7th**	**8th**	**9th**	**10th**
Points	20	15	11	8	6	5	4	3	2	1

Qualifying points

Position	**1st**	**2nd**	**3rd**
Points	3	2	1

=== Drivers' Championship ===
Pos.	Driver	MOT	OKA	SUG	AUT	SUZ1	SUZ2	FUJ	Points
1	(Japan) Naoki Yamamoto	13	6	3	2^{3}	**1**^{1}	Ret	5^{3}	62
2	(Japan) Ryō Hirakawa	**1**^{1}	**4**^{1}	2^{2}	12	Ret	7	6	60
3	(Japan) Sho Tsuboi	Ret	1	13	Ret	Ret	4	1^{2}	50
4	(New Zealand) Nick Cassidy	6	3	1	7	5	**Ret**^{1}	4	50
5	(Japan) Tomoki Nojiri	7	10	4	**1**^{1}	7^{2}	5	**Ret**^{1}	47
6	(Japan) Toshiki Oyu	15	15	12	10	8	1^{2}	2	41
7	(Japan) Kenta Yamashita	2^{3}		6	5	9	6	10	34
8	(Japan) Nirei Fukuzumi	5	8	10	9^{2}	Ret^{3}	2	16	29
9	(Japan) Yuji Kunimoto	Ret	7	5	4	3	Ret	15	29
10	(Japan) Hiroaki Ishiura	8	2	8	13	6	10	12	27
11	(Japan) Kazuki Nakajima	4		15		2	16	9	25
12	(Japan) Tadasuke Makino	9	Ret	7	3	Ret	8		20
13	(France) Sacha Fenestraz	3^{2}	Ret^{3}	Ret^{3}	Ret	10	Ret	8	19
14	(Japan) Yuhi Sekiguchi	Ret	5	11	11	DNS	3	DNS	17
15	(Japan) Nobuharu Matsushita				6	Ret	14	3	16
16	(Japan) Kamui Kobayashi	14		14		4	15	11	8
17	(Japan) Ritomo Miyata		9^{2}		8				7
18	(Japan) Ukyo Sasahara	11	13	Ret	14	Ret	11^{3}	7	5
19	(Japan) Kazuya Oshima	10	16	9	17	12	9	14	5
20	(Brazil) Sérgio Sette Câmara			**Ret**^{1}					3
21	(France) Charles Milesi				15	11	13	DNS	0
22	(Japan) Yuichi Nakayama		11		18				0
23	(Colombia) Tatiana Calderón	12			16	13	12	17	0
24	(Japan) Koudai Tsukakoshi		12	NC					0
25	(Japan) Hiroki Otsu							13	0
26	(Japan) Mitsunori Takaboshi		14						0
—	(Japan) Teppei Natori	DNS							0
—	(Japan) Sena Sakaguchi		DNS						0
Pos.	Driver	MOT	OKA	SUG	AUT	SUZ1	SUZ2	FUJ	Points

Colour	Result
Gold	Winner
Silver	Second place
Bronze	Third place
Green	Points classification
Blue	Non-points classification
Blue	Non-classified finish (NC)
Purple	Retired, not classified (Ret)
Red	Did not qualify (DNQ)
Red	Did not pre-qualify (DNPQ)
Black	Disqualified (DSQ)
White	Did not start (DNS)
White	Withdrew (WD)
White	Race cancelled (C)
Blank	Did not practice (DNP)
Blank	Did not arrive (DNA)
Blank	Excluded (EX)

**Bold** – Pole
Italics – Fastest Lap
^{1} – 3 Points for Pole
^{2} – 2 Points for P2
^{3} – 1 Points for P3

=== Teams' Championship ===
Pos.	Team	No.	MOT	OKA	SUG	AUT	SUZ1	SUZ2	FUJ	Points
1	Vantelin Team TOM’S	1	6	3	1	7	5	**Ret**^{1}	4	77
1	Vantelin Team TOM’S	36	4	9^{2}	15	8	2	16	9	77
2	JMS P.mu/Cerumo・INGING	38	8	2	8	13	6	10	12	72
2	JMS P.mu/Cerumo・INGING	39	Ret	1	13	Ret	Ret	4	1^{2}	72
3	Docomo Team Dandelion Racing	5	13	6	3	2^{3}	**1**^{1}	Ret	5^{3}	72
3	Docomo Team Dandelion Racing	6	5	8	10	9^{2}	Ret^{3}	2	16	72
4	Itochu Enex Team Impul	19	Ret	5	11	11	DNS	3	DNS	69
4	Itochu Enex Team Impul	20	**1**^{1}	**4**^{1}	2^{2}	12	Ret	7	6	69
5	TCS Nakajima Racing	64	9	Ret	7	3	Ret	8	13	57
5	TCS Nakajima Racing	65	15	15	12	10	8	1^{2}	2	57
6	Kondo Racing	3	2^{3}	DNS	6	5	9	6	10	46
6	Kondo Racing	4	3^{2}	Ret^{3}	Ret^{3}	Ret	10	Ret	8	46
7	Team Mugen	15	11	13	Ret	14	Ret	11^{3}	7	42
7	Team Mugen	16	7	10	4	**1**^{1}	7^{2}	5	**Ret**^{1}	42
8	carrozzeria Team KCMG	7	14	11	14	18	4	15	11	37
8	carrozzeria Team KCMG	18	Ret	7	5	4	3	Ret	15	37
9	Buzz Racing with B-MAX	50	DNS	14	**Ret**^{1}	6	Ret	14	3	16
9	Buzz Racing with B-MAX	51				15	11	13	DNS	16
10	ROOKIE Racing	14	10	16	9	17	12	9	14	5
11	Drago Corse with ThreeBond	12	12	12	NC	16	13	12	17	0
Pos.	Team	No.	MOT	OKA	SUG	AUT	SUZ1	SUZ2	FUJ	Points
