= 2009 Formula Challenge Japan =

Japanese formula racing season

The 2009 Formula Challenge Japan was a multi-event motor racing championship for open-wheel formula racing cars, and the fourth season of the Formula Challenge Japan racing series, a young driver development series jointly supported by Honda, Toyota, and Nissan. The championship featured a mix of manufacturer-affiliated drivers and independent entries, and commenced on 4 April and ended on 27 September. All championship rounds were run in support of the Formula Nippon Championship.

Honda Formula Dream Project driver Kazuki Miura won the championship in his second year in the series, taking four consecutive race victories to claim the title over Nissan-supported Daiki Sasaki. All race winners - Miura, Sasaki, third-placed finisher Naoya Gamou, and his Honda stablemates Makoto Kanai and Tsubasa Mekaru - won both races of their winning race weekends, with the first round at Fuji Speedway being the only round to have two different race winners.

== Teams and drivers ==
All drivers competed in identical Tatuus FC106 chassis powered by Nismo-maintained Renault F4R engines. The entry list originally consisted of 27 entries, but would drop to 18 entries, largely due to the repercussions of the 2008 financial crisis in Japan.

| Team | No. | Driver | Rounds |
|---|---|---|---|
| FTRS RAJAS FCJ; Takagi Planning FTRS; FTRS Team NATS; FTRS Scholarship | 1 | (Japan) Yūichi Nakayama | All |
| FTRS RAJAS FCJ; Takagi Planning FTRS; FTRS Team NATS; FTRS Scholarship | 2 | (Japan) Kazuya Ishii | All |
| FTRS RAJAS FCJ; Takagi Planning FTRS; FTRS Team NATS; FTRS Scholarship | 3 | (Japan) Makoto Kanai | All |
| FTRS RAJAS FCJ; Takagi Planning FTRS; FTRS Team NATS; FTRS Scholarship | 5 | (Japan) Tsubasa Mekaru | 1–12 |
| FTRS RAJAS FCJ; Takagi Planning FTRS; FTRS Team NATS; FTRS Scholarship | 6 | (Japan) Tobio Ohtani | All |
| FTRS RAJAS FCJ; Takagi Planning FTRS; FTRS Team NATS; FTRS Scholarship | 16 | (Japan) Naoya Gamou | All |
| FTRS RAJAS FCJ; Takagi Planning FTRS; FTRS Team NATS; FTRS Scholarship | 18 | (Japan) Ryō Ohtani | All |
| NDDP Autobacs FCJ; NDDP Provile FCJ; NDDP Azillion FCJ; NDDP FCJ | 4 | (Japan) Daiki Sasaki | All |
| NDDP Autobacs FCJ; NDDP Provile FCJ; NDDP Azillion FCJ; NDDP FCJ | 12 | (Japan) Takeshi Matsumoto | All |
| NDDP Autobacs FCJ; NDDP Provile FCJ; NDDP Azillion FCJ; NDDP FCJ | 14 | (Japan) Shōgo Suzuki | All |
| NDDP Autobacs FCJ; NDDP Provile FCJ; NDDP Azillion FCJ; NDDP FCJ | 15 | (Japan) Tatsuya Hattori | All |
| Avanzza × BOMEX | 6 | (Ukraine) Igor Sushko | All |
| Nichiryo | 7 | (Japan) Kazusa Ōuchi | All |
| HFDP/SRS-F/ARTA; HFDP/SRS-F Scholarship | 8 | (Japan) Tomoki Nojiri | All |
| HFDP/SRS-F/ARTA; HFDP/SRS-F Scholarship | 11 | (Japan) Ryōji Motojima | All |
| HFDP/SRS-F/ARTA; HFDP/SRS-F Scholarship | 18 | (Japan) Kazuki Miura | All |
| Dragon Knight | 10 | (China) Zhu Daiwei | All |
| Project KK | 13 | (Japan) Kazuki Kawamura | All |

== Race calendar and results ==
All races were held in Japan in support of Formula Nippon.

| Round | Circuit | Date | Pole position | Fastest lap | Winning driver |
|---|---|---|---|---|---|
| 1 | Fuji Speedway, Oyama | 4 April | (Japan) Naoya Gamou | (Japan) Daiki Sasaki | (Japan) Daiki Sasaki |
| 2 | Fuji Speedway, Oyama | 5 April | (Japan) Daiki Sasaki | (Japan) Tsubasa Mekaru | (Japan) Naoya Gamou |
| 3 | Suzuka Circuit, Suzuka | 16 May | (Japan) Tomoki Nojiri | (Japan) Tomoki Nojiri | (Japan) Makoto Kanai |
| 4 | Suzuka Circuit, Suzuka | 17 May | (Japan) Takeshi Matsumoto | (Japan) Tomoki Nojiri | (Japan) Makoto Kanai |
| 5 | Twin Ring Motegi, Motegi | 30 May | (Japan) Daiki Sasaki | (Japan) Daiki Sasaki | (Japan) Daiki Sasaki |
| 6 | Twin Ring Motegi, Motegi | 31 May | (Japan) Daiki Sasaki | (Japan) Tomoki Nojiri | (Japan) Daiki Sasaki |
| 7 | Fuji Speedway, Oyama | 27 June | (Japan) Tsubasa Mekaru | (Japan) Tsubasa Mekaru | (Japan) Kazuki Miura |
| 8 | Fuji Speedway, Oyama | 28 June | (Japan) Tsubasa Mekaru | (Japan) Kazuya Ishii | (Japan) Kazuki Miura |
| 9 | Suzuka Circuit, Suzuka | 11 July | (Japan) Kazuki Miura | (Japan) Kazuki Miura | (Japan) Kazuki Miura |
| 10 | Suzuka Circuit, Suzuka | 12 July | (Japan) Kazuki Miura | (Japan) Kazuki Miura | (Japan) Kazuki Miura |
| 11 | Twin Ring Motegi, Motegi | 8 August | (Japan) Kazuki Miura | (Japan) Kazuya Ishii | (Japan) Tsubasa Mekaru |
| 12 | Twin Ring Motegi, Motegi | 9 August | (Japan) Kazuki Miura | (Japan) Daiki Sasaki | (Japan) Tsubasa Mekaru |
| 13 | Sportsland SUGO, Murata | 26 September | (Japan) Naoya Gamou | (Japan) Yūichi Nakayama | (Japan) Naoya Gamou |
| 14 | Sportsland SUGO, Murata | 27 September | (Japan) Naoya Gamou | (Japan) Yūichi Nakayama | (Japan) Naoya Gamou |

== Championship standings ==
=== Drivers' Championship ===
Points were awarded to the top six classified finishers, with one point awarded for pole position and fastest lap respectively.

| 1 | 2 | 3 | 4 | 5 | 6 | PP | FL |
|---|---|---|---|---|---|---|---|
| 10 | 7 | 5 | 3 | 2 | 1 | **1** | 1 |

| Pos. | Driver | FUJ | | SUZ | | MOT | | FUJ | | SUZ | | MOT | | SUG | | Points |
|---|---|---|---|---|---|---|---|---|---|---|---|---|---|---|---|---|
| 1 | (Japan) Kazuki Miura | 9 | 5 | 5 | 9 | 2 | 3 | 1 | 1 | **1** | **1** | **2** | **3** | 6 | 6 | 76 |
| 2 | (Japan) Daiki Sasaki | 1 | **4** | 6 | 4 | **1** | **1** | 2 | 6 | 3 | 4 | 6 | 4 | 5 | 3 | 70 |
| 3 | (Japan) Naoya Gamou | **2** | 1 | 2 | 12 | 3 | 10 | 8 | 4 | 4 | 3 | 5 | 7 | **1** | **1** | 65 |
| 4 | (Japan) Yūichi Nakayama | 3 | 3 | 14 | Ret | 6 | 7 | 3 | 2 | 11 | 5 | 18 | 8 | 2 | 2 | 41 |
| 5 | (Japan) Tomoki Nojiri | 12 | 18 | **3** | 3 | 7 | Ret | 7 | 11 | 2 | 2 | 4 | 10 | 3 | 4 | 39 |
| 6 | (Japan) Makoto Kanai | 8 | 6 | 1 | 1 | 9 | 2 | 12 | 5 | 5 | 6 | 8 | 5 | 7 | 7 | 35 |
| 7 | (Japan) Tsubasa Mekaru | Ret | 17 | 17 | 10 | 5 | 5 | **11** | **15** | 6 | 16 | 1 | 1 | | | 29 |
| 8 | (Japan) Kazuya Ishii | Ret | 2 | 7 | Ret | 11 | 11 | 10 | 13 | 7 | 8 | 3 | 2 | 13 | Ret | 21 |
| 9 | (Japan) Takeshi Matsumoto | 6 | 8 | 4 | **2** | 10 | 4 | 4 | 7 | 15 | 17 | 9 | 17 | 4 | 13 | 21 |
| 10 | (Japan) Ryō Ohtani | 5 | 9 | 11 | 5 | 13 | 9 | 5 | 3 | 13 | 9 | 7 | 6 | 8 | 5 | 14 |
| 11 | (Japan) Tobio Ohtani | 13 | 12 | 8 | 7 | 4 | 6 | 6 | 8 | 8 | 7 | 13 | 9 | 11 | 9 | 5 |
| 12 | (Japan) Kazuki Kawamura | 4 | 7 | 18 | Ret | 17 | Ret | 15 | 16 | Ret | 10 | 11 | 14 | 10 | 12 | 3 |
| 13 | (China) Zhu Daiwei | 7 | 10 | 15 | 6 | 8 | 8 | Ret | 12 | 17 | 11 | 15 | 12 | 12 | 14 | 1 |
| - | (Japan) Shōgo Suzuki | 16 | 11 | 10 | 8 | Ret | 15 | 13 | 14 | 14 | 12 | 10 | 11 | 15 | 8 | 0 |
| - | (Japan) Tatsuya Hattori | 10 | 16 | 12 | Ret | 16 | 16 | 9 | 9 | 10 | 18 | 16 | 13 | 9 | 10 | 0 |
| - | (Japan) Ryōji Motojima | 11 | 13 | 9 | 13 | 12 | 13 | Ret | 10 | 9 | 15 | 12 | Ret | Ret | 15 | 0 |
| - | (Japan) Kazusa Ōuchi | 14 | 15 | 16 | 11 | 15 | 14 | 16 | 17 | 16 | 13 | 17 | 16 | 14 | 11 | 0 |
| - | (Ukraine) Igor Sushko | 15 | 14 | 13 | Ret | 14 | 12 | 14 | 18 | 12 | 14 | 14 | 15 | Ret | 16 | 0 |
| Pos. | Driver | FUJ | | SUZ | | MOT | | FUJ | | SUZ | | MOT | | SUG | | Points |

Key
| Colour | Result |
|---|---|
| Gold | Race winner |
| Silver | 2nd place |
| Bronze | 3rd place |
| Green | Points finish |
| Blue | Non-points finish |
| Blue | Non-classified finish (NC) |
| Purple | Did not finish (Ret) |
| Black | Disqualified (DSQ) |
| Black | Excluded (EX) |
| White | Did not start (DNS) |
| White | Race cancelled (C) |
| White | Withdrew (WD) |
| Blank | Did not participate |

**Bold** – Pole
Italics – Fastest Lap
