= Tomoki Nojiri =

Japanese racing driver (born 1989)

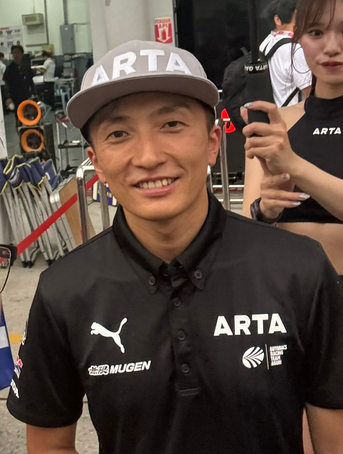
- Nojiri at the 2025 Super GT Malaysia Festival
- Nationality: (Japan) Japanese
- Born: 15 September 1989 (age 37) Sekijō (now Chikusei), Ibaraki, Japan

Super Formula career
- Debut season: 2014
- Current team: Team Mugen
- Car number: 16
- Former teams: Dandelion Racing
- Starts: 99
- Wins: 14
- Podiums: 32
- Poles: 22
- Fastest laps: 8
- Best finish: 1st in 2021, 2022

Super GT - GT500 career
- Debut season: 2015
- Current team: ARTA
- Car number: 16
- Former teams: Team Mugen
- Starts: 87
- Wins: 9
- Podiums: 14
- Poles: 12
- Fastest laps: 8
- Best finish: 2nd in 2021

Previous series
- 2013–14 2011–13 2009–10: Super GT - GT300; All-Japan Formula Three Championship; Formula Challenge Japan

Championship titles
- 2021-22: Super Formula

Tomoki Nojiri (野尻智紀, Nojiri Tomoki; born 15 September 1989) is a Japanese racing driver who currently competes as a Honda factory driver in Super GT for ARTA and in Super Formula for Team Mugen, where he won the championship title in 2021 and 2022.

== Racing career ==
=== Early career ===
Nojiri began his karting career in the All-Japan Karting Championship in 2003, and in 2006, he became the FA class champion. Nojiri moved to Europe to race in the European championship, the Italian Masters, and World Cup KF1 in 2007. In 2008, Nojiri was the top graduate from the Suzuka Circuit Racing School Formula, earning him a scholarship to compete in Formula Challenge Japan (FCJ) for 2009. He finished fifth in the FCJ standings in 2009, and again in 2010, while also finishing fifth in the JAF Formula 4 West Series in 2009.

In 2011, Nojiri graduated to the All-Japan Formula 3 Championship National Class with HFDP Racing. He won three times, including in his first start at Suzuka Circuit, and finished second in the championship to Katsumasa Chiyo. In 2021, Nojiri stepped up to the main level championship in Japanese F3; he finished fifth in the standings, and won the tenth round at Okayama International Circuit. Nojiri moved to Toda Racing in 2013, where he finished fourth in the championship.

=== Super Formula ===
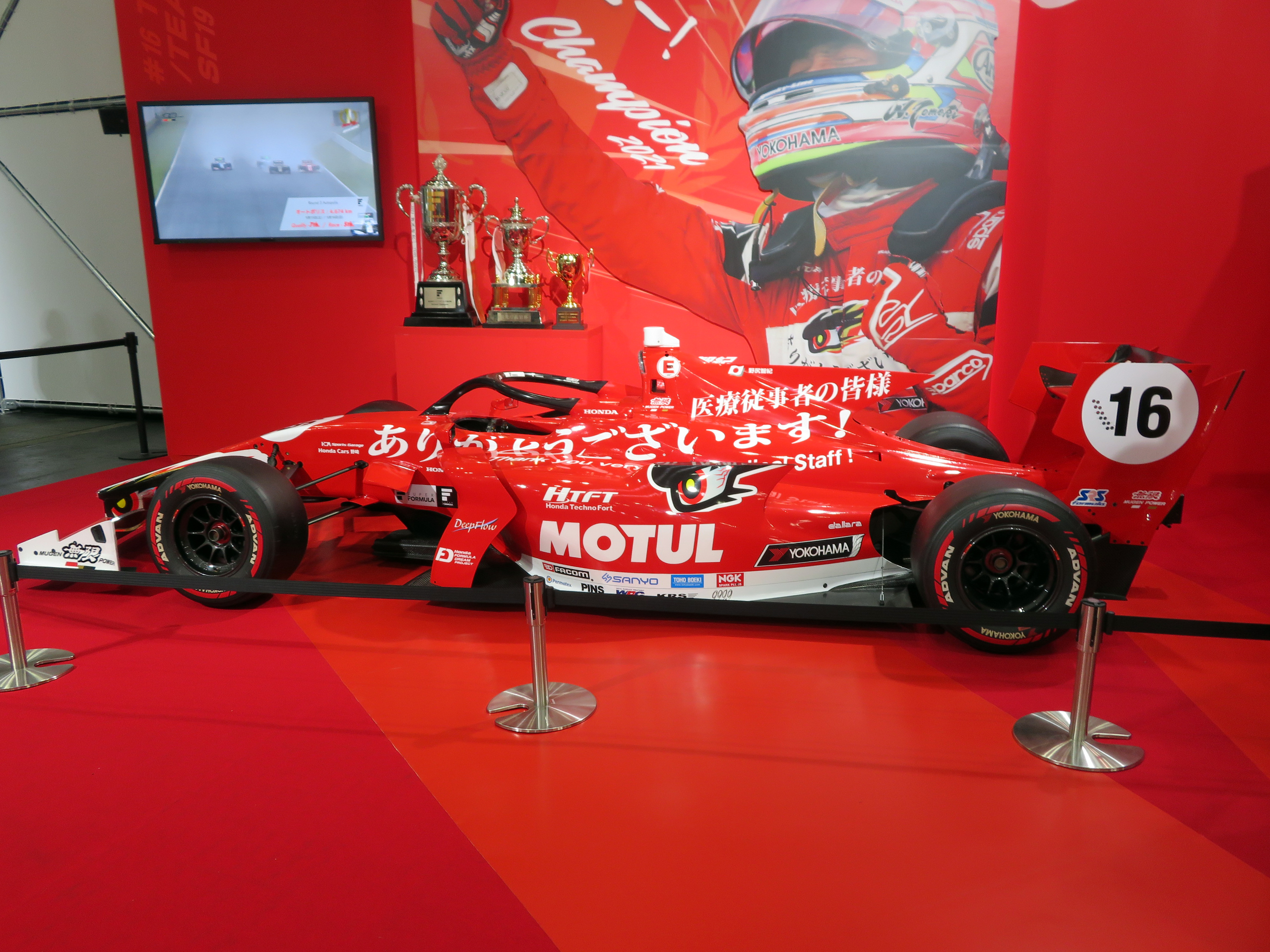
Nojiri's championship-winning 2021 car on display

==== Dandelion Racing ====
In 2014, Nojiri joined docomo Team Dandelion Racing in the Super Formula Championship. In the sixth and penultimate round of the championship at Sportsland Sugo, Nojiri scored his first career victory in just his seventh race. He finished the year tenth in the championship, and won Rookie of the Year honours ahead of Formula One veteran Vitantonio Liuzzi, and reigning Japanese F3 champion Yuichi Nakayama. Nojiri remained with Dandelion Racing from 2015 to 2018. He finished seventh in the championship in 2015, ninth in 2016, and seventh in 2018. Over these four seasons, Nojiri won three pole positions, recorded four podiums, and two fastest laps.

==== Team Mugen ====
For the 2019 season, Nojiri transferred to Team Mugen, in a swap for reigning champion Naoki Yamamoto (who took Nojiri's place at Dandelion Racing). The move to Mugen, along with the introduction of the new Dallara SF19 chassis, paid dividends for Nojiri. He finished a career-best fourth in the championship, while also ending a five-year winless drought at the season-ending JAF Grand Prix in Suzuka. He finished fifth in the championship in 2020, winning the fourth round at Autopolis from pole position.

Nojiri won back-to-back races at Fuji Speedway and Suzuka to open the 2021 season. He then went on to win the fifth round at Mobility Resort Motegi from pole position. In the next race at Motegi, Nojiri finished fifth to clinch his first Super Formula drivers' championship, becoming the first driver since Loïc Duval in 2009 to clinch the Japanese top formula championship before the final round of the season.

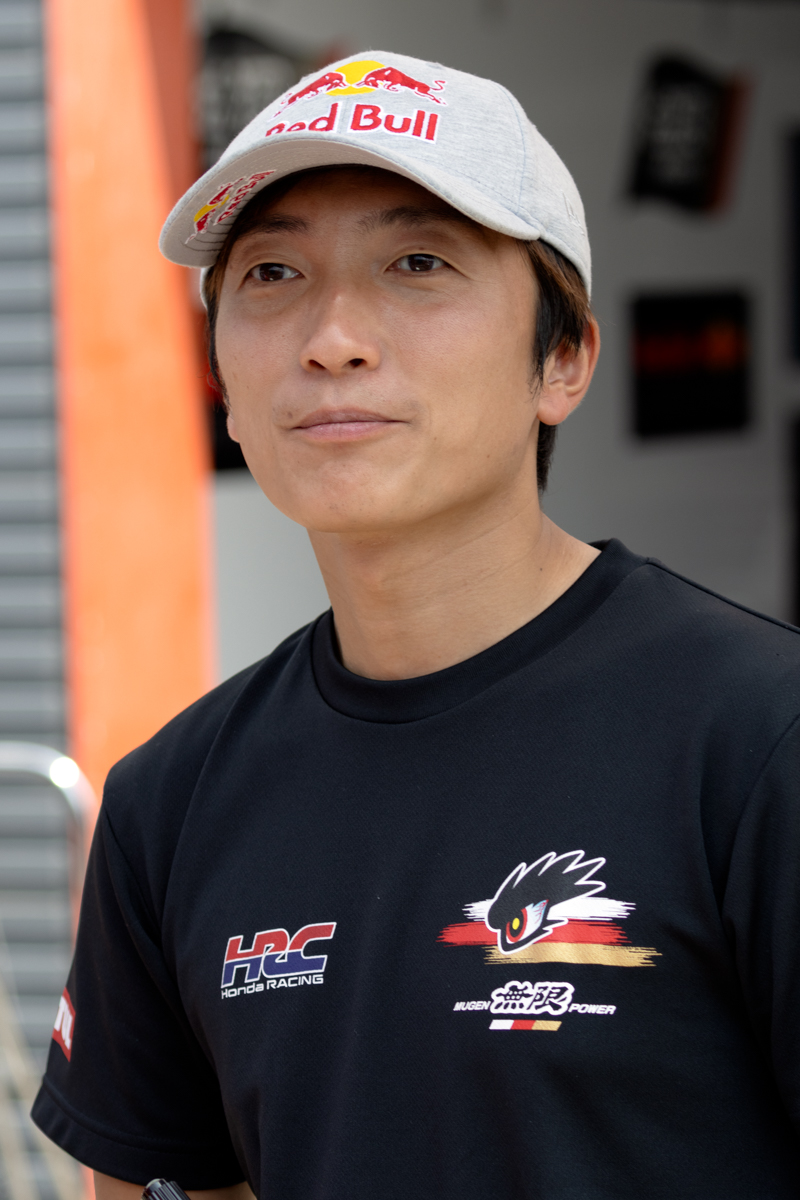
Nojiri at the 2024 Super Formula Motegi round

Nojiri's form carried into 2022; he opened the season with a win and second place finish at the doubleheader weekend at Fuji, along with a pole position in round two. He strung together four consecutive pole positions, six podiums and never finished lower than fourth in the first eight races of the season. At the JAF Grand Prix Suzuka, Nojiri won the pole for the first race, and clinched his second consecutive championship with a second place finish. He completed the season with a pole-to-win victory, his second of the season. Nojiri became the first driver since Tsugio Matsuda to win consecutive championships in Japanese top formula racing.

=== Super GT ===
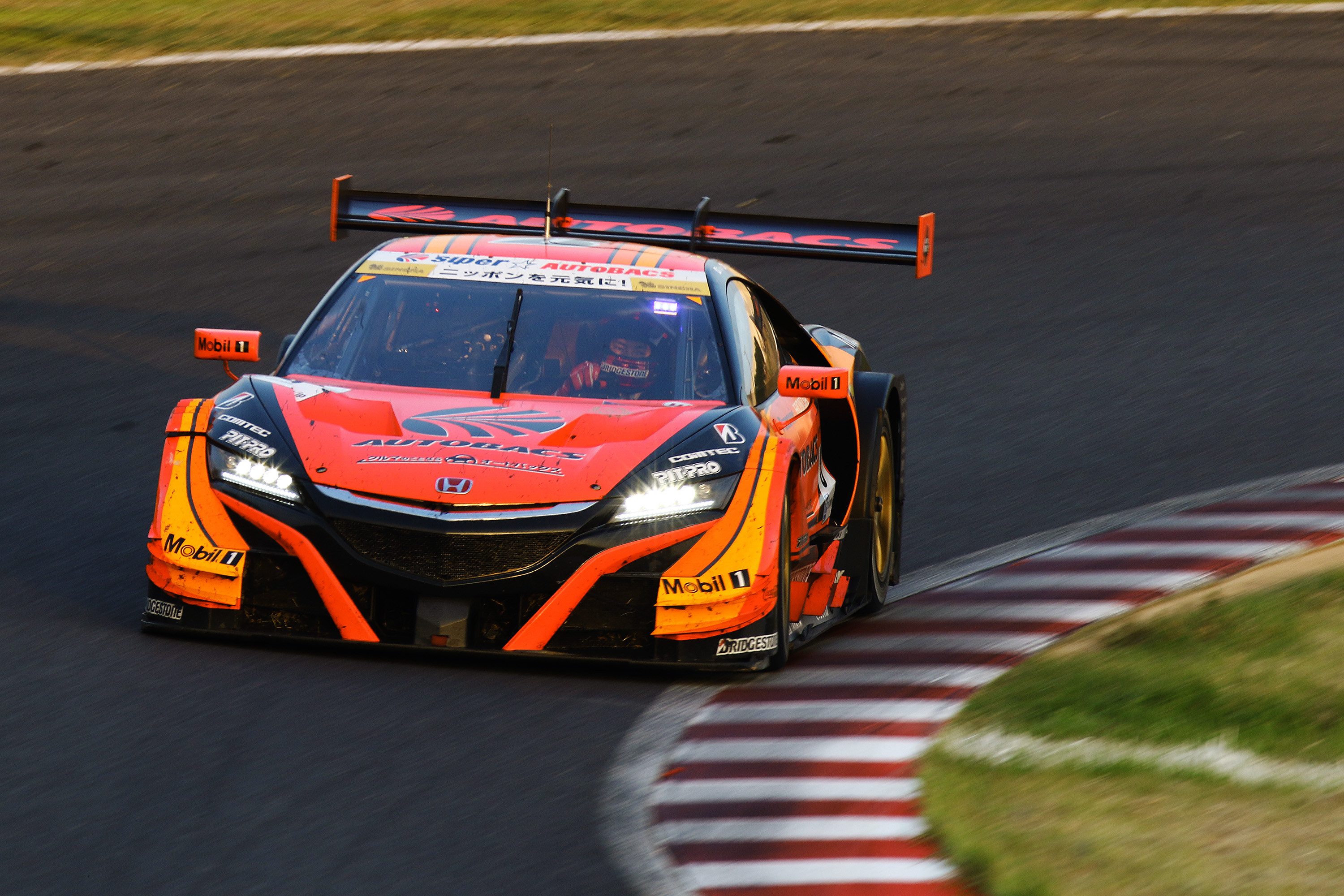
The Honda NSX-GT with which Nojiri took his first Super GT win in 2017

==== GT300 ====
Nojiri's first Super GT start came in the GT300 class, driving Autobacs Racing Team Aguri (ARTA)'s Honda CR-Z GT300 at the 2013 Suzuka 1000km. He stepped up to full-time Super GT competition in 2014 with Team Mugen, taking over for reigning GT300 champion Hideki Mutoh. Nojiri and co-driver Yuhki Nakayama finished tenth in the GT300 championship, with a third place finish at the Fuji 500 km.

==== GT500 ====
In 2015, Nojiri moved up to the GT500 class with ARTA, driving a Honda NSX-GT. He finished fourth in his top class debut, at Okayama. Two years later, Nojiri won his first GT500 pole in the fourth round at Sugo, and then won the fifth round at Fuji Speedway (with co-driver Takashi Kobayashi) to take his first career GT500 victory. Takuya Izawa transferred to ARTA as Nojiri's new co-driver in 2018. Nojiri and Izawa won the third round at Suzuka, and the eighth and final round at Motegi, en route to a third place finish in the GT500 championship. They won the rain-shortened opening round at Okayama in 2019, but fell to tenth in the standings at the end of the season.

For 2020, Nirei Fukuzumi joined ARTA as Nojiri's co-driver. After a difficult start to the season, Nojiri and Fukuzumi strung together four top five finishes to finish the year fifth in the championship; this included a win at the seventh round at Motegi. Nojiri and Fukuzumi returned to ARTA for the 2021 season. One week after clinching the Super Formula championship, Nojiri won the sixth round of the Super GT series at Autopolis alongside Fukuzumi, then won the following round at Motegi. They finished the year second in the drivers' championship.

In 2022, Nojiri and Fukuzumi won a shortened Golden Week race at Fuji Speedway.

Nojiri was joined by Toshiki Oyu for the 2023 season after Fukuzumi was moved to ARTA's new sister entry to partner Hiroki Otsu. Nojiri and Oyu would go on to finish eighth in the championship after inconsistent qualifying form throughout the season, taking a dominant victory at Sportsland Sugo. For the 2024 season, he would race alongside Nobuharu Matsushita, who would move over from Real Racing after Oyu's departure from the Honda factory stable for rivals Toyota Gazoo Racing.

== Racing record ==
=== Career summary ===
Season	Series	Team	Races	Wins	Poles	F/Laps	Podiums	Points	Position
2009	Formula Challenge Japan	HDFP/SRS-F ARTA	8	0	1	3	5	39	5th
2009	JAF Formula 4 - West Series	Autobacs SUCCEED	6	0	0	0	1	33	5th
2009	Formula BMW Pacific	TopSpeed Racing Shanghai	1	0	0	0	0	0	NC†
2010	Formula Challenge Japan	HDFP/SRS-F ARTA	8	0	0	0	3	27	5th
2010	Formula BMW Pacific	EuroInternational	1	0	0	0	1	0	NC†
2011	Japanese Formula 3 Championship - National	Honda Formula Dream Project	14	3	5	2	10	89	**2nd**
2012	Japanese Formula 3 Championship	Honda Formula Dream Project	15	1	2	1	6	49	5th
2013	Japanese Formula 3 Championship	Toda Racing	15	0	0	0	7	50	4th
2013	Super GT - GT300	Autobacs Racing Team Aguri	2	0	0	0	0	0	NC
2013	Asian Le Mans Series - SGT	Autobacs Racing Team Aguri	1	0	0	0	0	0	NC
2014	Super Formula	docomo Team Dandelion Racing	9	1	0	0	1	10	10th
2014	Super GT - GT300	Team Mugen	8	0	0	0	1	26	11th
2015	Super GT - GT500	Autobacs Racing Team Aguri	8	0	0	0	0	10	14th
2015	Super Formula	docomo Team Dandelion Racing	8	0	0	2	2	19	7th
2016	Super GT - GT500	Autobacs Racing Team Aguri	8	0	0	0	0	16	15th
2016	Super Formula	docomo Team Dandelion Racing	8	0	1	0	1	14.5	9th
2017	Super GT - GT500	Autobacs Racing Team Aguri	8	1	3	2	1	37	9th
2017	Super Formula	docomo Team Dandelion Racing	8	0	1	0	0	2	17th
2017	Super Taikyu - ST-X	K's Frontier	3	0	0	0	0	36‡	7th‡
2018	Super GT - GT500	Autobacs Racing Team Aguri	8	2	3	2	3	71	**3rd**
2018	Super Formula	docomo Team Dandelion Racing	7	0	1	0	1	12.5	7th
2019	Super GT - GT500	ARTA	8	1	0	0	0	31	10th
2019	Super Formula	Team Mugen	7	1	0	0	1	24	4th
2019	Super Taikyu - ST-TCR	Modulo Racing with Dome	1	0	1	0	0	88‡	**2nd‡**
2020	Super GT - GT500	ARTA	8	1	0	0	3	54	5th
2020	Super Formula	Team Mugen	7	1	2	0	1	47	5th
2020	Super Taikyu - ST-TCR	Floral Racing with Uematsu	1	0	0	0	1	194‡	**1st‡**
2021	Super GT - GT500	ARTA	8	2	1	0	2	60	**2nd**
2021	Super Formula	Team Mugen	7	3	2	2	4	86	**1st**
2022	Super GT - GT500	ARTA	8	1	0	0	1	24	12th
2022	Super Formula	Team Mugen	10	2	6	1	8	154	**1st**
2022	N-ONE Owner's Cup	Tomoki Nojiri	1	0	0	0	1	45	47th
2023	Super GT - GT500	ARTA	7	1	1	0	2	35	8th
2023	Super Formula	Team Mugen	8	3	4	0	5	106	**3rd**
2024	Super GT - GT500	ARTA	6	1	1	0	1	26*	10th*
2024	Super Formula	Team Mugen	9	2	2	2	4	87	**2nd**
2024	Super Taikyu - ST-Q	Team HRC							
2024	Super Taikyu - ST-2	Honda R&D Challenge							
2025	Super Formula	Team Mugen	12	1	4	0	4	94.5	5th
2025	Super GT - GT500	ARTA	8	0	0	0	1	30.5	9th
2025	Super Taikyu - ST-2	Honda R&D Challenge							
2026	Super Formula	Team Mugen							
2026	Super GT - GT500	ARTA Mugen	8	1	0	1	1	45	7th
2026	Super Taikyu - ST-TCR	M&K Racing							

^{†} As Nojiri was a guest driver, he was ineligible to score points.
^{‡} Team standings.
^{*} Season still in progress.

=== Complete Japanese Formula 3 results ===
(key) (Races in bold indicate pole position) (Races in italics indicate fastest lap)

Year	Team	Engine	Class	1	2	3	4	5	6	7	8	9	10	11	12	13	14	15	16	DC	Pts
2011	HFDP Racing	Toyota	N	SUZ; 1; 4	**SUZ**; **2**; 7	FUJ; 1; 6	FUJ; 2; 8	FUJ; 3; 5	FUJ; 1; 8	**FUJ**; **2**; 8	MOT; 1; 8	MOT; 2; 11	**OKA**; **1**; 3	**OKA**; **2**; 10	SUZ; 1 C	SUZ; 2 C	SUG; 1; 7	**SUG**; **2**; 8	SUG; 3; 10	2nd	89
2012	HFDP Racing	Toda Racing		SUZ; 1; 3	SUZ; 2; 3	MOT; 1; 5	MOT; 2; 3	FUJ; 1; 8	FUJ; 2 Ret	MOT; 1; 5	MOT; 2; 2	OKA; 1; 2	OKA; 2; 1	SUG; 1; 9	SUG; 2; 5	SUG; 3; 6	FUJ; 1; 8	FUJ; 2 Ret		5th	49
2013	Toda Racing	Toda Racing		SUZ; 1; 6	SUZ; 2; 6	MOT; 1; 3	MOT; 2; 4	MOT; 3; 6	OKA; 1; 2	OKA; 2; 3	FUJ; 1; 3	FUJ; 2; 6	MOT; 1; 3	MOT; 2; 3	SUG; 1 Ret	SUG; 2; 2	FUJ; 1; 6	FUJ; 2; 4		4th	50

=== Complete Super GT results ===
(key) (Races in bold indicate pole position) (Races in italics indicate fastest lap)

Year	Team	Car	Class	1	2	3	4	5	6	7	8	9	DC	Points
2013	Autobacs Racing Team Aguri	Honda CR-Z	GT300	OKA	FUJ	SEP	SUG	SUZ; Ret	FUJ	FUJ; Ret	AUT	MOT	NC	0
2014	Team Mugen	Honda CR-Z	GT300	OKA; 9	FUJ; 3	AUT; 5	SUG; 11	FUJ; 18	SUZ; 8	BUR; 9	MOT; 13		10th	26
2015	Autobacs Racing Team Aguri	Honda NSX Concept-GT	GT500	OKA; 4	FUJ; 13	CHA; Ret	FUJ; Ret	SUZ; 10	SUG; 12	AUT; 14	MOT; 11		14th	10
2016	Autobacs Racing Team Aguri	Honda NSX Concept-GT	GT500	OKA; Ret	FUJ; 6	SUG; 14	FUJ; 6	SUZ; 9	CHA; 8	MOT; 11	MOT; 13		15th	16
2017	Autobacs Racing Team Aguri	Honda NSX-GT	GT500	**OKA**; DNS	FUJ; 9	AUT; Ret	**SUG**; 5	**FUJ**; 1	SUZ; 8	CHA; 11	MOT; 9		9th	37
2018	Autobacs Racing Team Aguri	Honda NSX-GT	GT500	OKA; 11	FUJ; 8	**SUZ**; 1	CHA; Ret	FUJ; 4	SUG; 2	**AUT**; 12	**MOT**; 1		3rd	71
2019	ARTA	Honda NSX-GT	GT500	OKA; 1‡	FUJ; 9	SUZ; 4	CHA; Ret	FUJ; 7	AUT; 5	SUG; 12	MOT; 13		10th	31
2020	ARTA	Honda NSX-GT	GT500	FUJ; 8	**FUJ**; 14	SUZ; 13	MOT; Ret	**FUJ**; 3	**SUZ**; 3	MOT; 1	FUJ; 5		5th	54
2021	ARTA	Honda NSX-GT	GT500	OKA; 7	FUJ; 8	MOT; 5	SUZ; 11	**SUG**; 10	AUT; 1	MOT; 1	FUJ; 6		2nd	60
2022	ARTA	Honda NSX-GT	GT500	OKA; 10	FUJ1; 1	SUZ1; 7	FUJ2; 5	SUZ2; 13	SUG; 13	AUT; 11	MOT; 8		12th	24
2023	ARTA	Honda NSX-GT	GT500	OKA; 3	FUJ1; 11	SUZ1; 12	FUJ2; 14	SUZ2; 14	**SUG**; 1	MOT; Ret	MOT; 5		8th	35
2024	ARTA	Honda Civic Type R-GT	GT500	OKA; 8	FUJ; 14	SUZ; Ret	**FUJ**; 1^{1}	SUZ; 15	SUG; 11	AUT; 2^{2}	MOT; 12		9th	43
2025	ARTA	Honda Civic Type R-GT	GT500	OKA; 7	FUJ; 9	SEP; 2	FS1; 10	FS2 (11)	SUZ; 11	SUG; 8	AUT; 10	MOT; 6	9th	30.5
2026	ARTA Mugen	Honda Prelude-GT	GT500	OKA; 6	FUJ; 5	FUJ; 9	SUZ; 1	SUG; Ret	AUT; 9	MOT; 6	MOT; 6		7th	45

^{‡} Half points awarded as less than 75% of race distance was completed.
^{(Number)} Driver did not take part in this sprint race, points are still awarded for the teammate's result.
^{*} Season still in progress.

=== Complete Super Formula results ===
(key) (Races in bold indicate pole position) (Races in italics indicate fastest lap)

Year	Team	Engine	1	2	3	4	5	6	7	8	9	10	11	12	DC	Points
2014	docomo Team Dandelion Racing	Honda	SUZ; 9	FUJ; Ret	FUJ; 15	FUJ; 12	MOT; 9	AUT; 9	SUG; 1	SUZ; 12	SUZ; 9				10th	10
2015	docomo Team Dandelion Racing	Honda	SUZ; 8	OKA; 3	FUJ; 8	MOT; 6	AUT; 10	SUG; 3	SUZ; 5	SUZ; Ret					7th	19
2016	docomo Team Dandelion Racing	Honda	SUZ; 9	OKA; 4	FUJ; 13	MOT; Ret	OKA; 4	**OKA**; 16	SUG; 3	SUZ; 4	SUZ; Ret				9th	14.5
2017	docomo Team Dandelion Racing	Honda	SUZ; 16	OKA; 13	OKA; 10	FUJ; 10	MOT; 8	**AUT**; 14	SUG; 12	SUZ; C	SUZ; C				17th	2
2018	docomo Team Dandelion Racing	Honda	SUZ; 3	AUT; C	**SUG**; 7	FUJ; 14	MOT; 8	OKA; 4	SUZ; 9						7th	12.5
2019	Team Mugen	Honda	SUZ; 4	AUT; 18	SUG; Ret	FUJ; 4	MOT; 8	OKA; 9	SUZ; 1						4th	24
2020	Team Mugen	Honda	MOT; 7	OKA; 10	SUG; 4	**AUT**; 1^{1}	SUZ; 7^{2}	SUZ; 5	**FUJ**; Ret^{1}						5th	47
2021	Team Mugen	Honda	**FUJ**; 1^{1}	SUZ; 1^{2}	AUT; 5	SUG; 6	**MOT**; 1^{1}	MOT; 5^{3}	SUZ; 3						1st	86
2022	Team Mugen	Honda	FUJ; 2	**FUJ**; 1^{1}	**SUZ**; 2^{1}	**AUT**; 4^{1}	**SUG**; 3^{1}	FUJ; 3^{3}	MOT; 3	MOT; 4^{3}	**SUZ**; 2^{1}	**SUZ**; 1^{1}			1st	154
2023	Team Mugen	Honda	**FUJ**; 2^{1}	**FUJ**; 1^{1}	SUZ; Ret^{3}	AUT	SUG; 2^{3}	FUJ; 8	**MOT**; 1^{1}	**SUZ**; 1^{1}	SUZ; 4^{3}				3rd	106
2024	Team Mugen	Honda	SUZ; 1^{3}	AUT; 9	**SUG**; 1	FUJ; 3	MOT; 3	FUJ; 6^{3}	FUJ; 7^{2}	SUZ; 5	**SUZ**; 4^{1}				2nd	87
2025	Team Mugen	Honda	**SUZ**; 7^{1}	**SUZ**; 4^{1}	MOT; 9	MOT; 10	**AUT**; 2^{1}	**FUJ**; 2^{1}	FUJ; 12	SUG; 15	FUJ; 3^{3}	SUZ; 1^{2}	SUZ; 5	SUZ; 10	5th	94.5
2026	Team Mugen	Honda	MOT	MOT	AUT	SUZ	SUZ	FUJ	FUJ	SUG	FUJ	FUJ	SUZ	SUZ		

^{‡} Half points awarded as less than 75% of race distance was completed.
^{*} Season still in progress.

Sporting positions
Preceded by Naoki Yamamoto	Super Formula; Champion; 2021–2022	Succeeded by Ritomo Miyata
