= 2021 Super Formula Championship =

Japanese motor racing camptionship

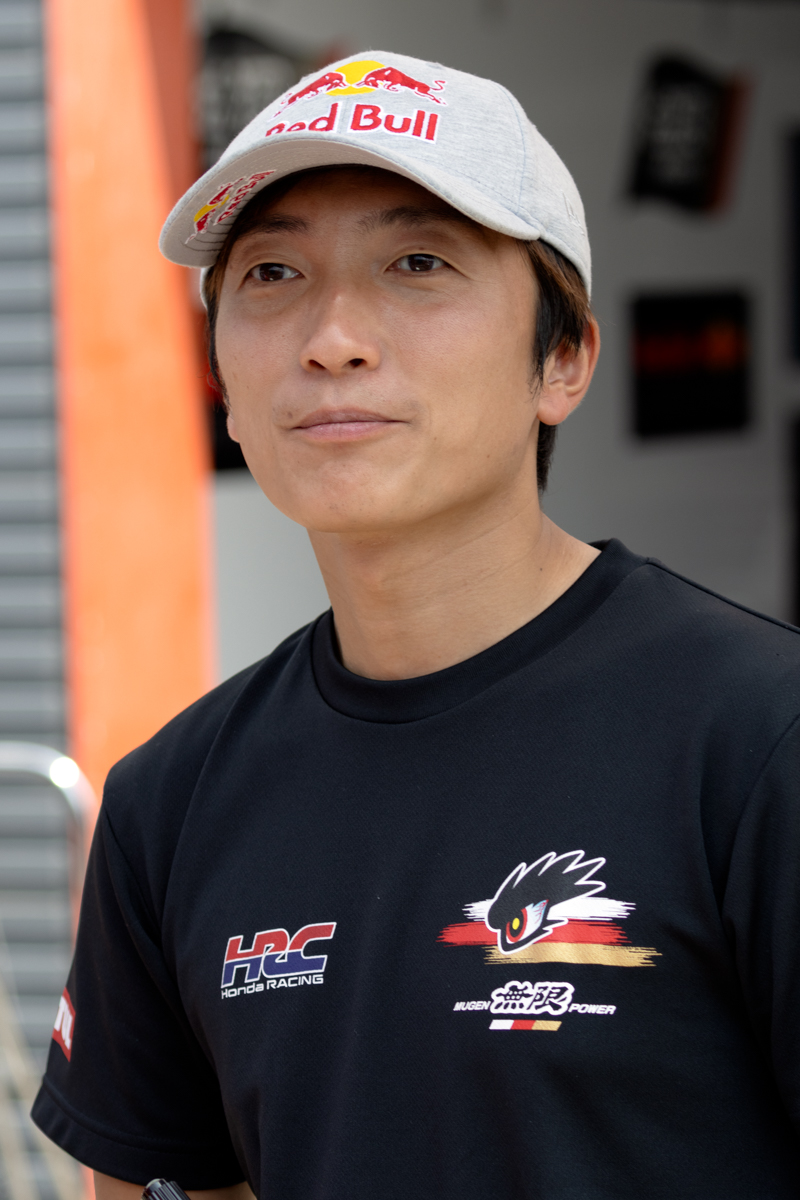
Tomoki Nojiri won his first Super Formula Championship title.

The 2021 Japanese Super Formula Championship was the forty-ninth season of premier Japanese open-wheel motor racing, and the ninth under the moniker of Super Formula. Naoki Yamamoto entered the 2021 season as the defending drivers' champion.

Tomoki Nojiri took his first drivers' championship at the penultimate round at Motegi, while Team Impul took their first teams' championship since 2010 at the season finale.

== Teams and drivers ==
Every Honda-powered car used a Honda HR-414E engine and every Toyota-powered car used a Toyota RI4A engine.

Team	Engine	No.	Driver	Rounds
(Japan) TCS Nakajima Racing	Honda	1	(Japan) Naoki Yamamoto	All
(Japan) TCS Nakajima Racing	Honda	64	(Japan) Toshiki Oyu	All
(Japan) Kondo Racing	Toyota	3	(Japan) Kenta Yamashita	All
(Japan) Kondo Racing	Toyota	4	(Japan) Yuichi Nakayama	1–5
(Japan) Kondo Racing	Toyota	4	(France) Sacha Fenestraz	6–7
(Japan) Docomo Team Dandelion Racing	Honda	5	(Japan) Nirei Fukuzumi	All
(Japan) Docomo Team Dandelion Racing	Honda	6	(Japan) Ukyo Sasahara	1–2
(Japan) Docomo Team Dandelion Racing	Honda	6	(Japan) Tadasuke Makino	3–7
(Hong Kong) carrozzeria Team KCMG	Toyota	7	(Japan) Kazuto Kotaka	1–5, 7
(Hong Kong) carrozzeria Team KCMG	Toyota	7	(Japan) Kamui Kobayashi	6
(Hong Kong) carrozzeria Team KCMG	Toyota	18	(Japan) Yuji Kunimoto	All
(Japan) Drago Corse with ThreeBond	Honda	12	(Colombia) Tatiana Calderón	1–2, 6–7
(Japan) Drago Corse with ThreeBond	Honda	12	(Japan) Koudai Tsukakoshi	3–5
(Japan) NTT Communications ROOKIE	Toyota	14	(Japan) Kazuya Oshima	All
(Japan) Red Bull Mugen Team Goh	Honda	15	(Japan) Hiroki Otsu	All
(Japan) Team Mugen	Honda	16	(Japan) Tomoki Nojiri	All
(Japan) carenex Team Impul	Toyota	19	(Japan) Yuhi Sekiguchi	All
(Japan) carenex Team Impul	Toyota	20	(Japan) Ryō Hirakawa	1–3, 5–7
(Japan) carenex Team Impul	Toyota	20	(Japan) Mitsunori Takaboshi	4
(Japan) Kuo Vantelin Team TOM’S	Toyota	36	(Japan) Kazuki Nakajima	1, 6
(Japan) Kuo Vantelin Team TOM’S	Toyota	36	(France) Giuliano Alesi	2–5, 7
(Japan) Kuo Vantelin Team TOM’S	Toyota	37	(Japan) Ritomo Miyata	All
(Japan) P.mu/Cerumo・INGING	Toyota	38	(Japan) Sho Tsuboi	All
(Japan) P.mu/Cerumo・INGING	Toyota	39	(Japan) Sena Sakaguchi	All
(Japan) B-Max Racing	Honda	51	(Japan) Nobuharu Matsushita	2–7

=== Team changes ===
- Team Mugen run one car, as the other car run together with Servus Japan under Team Goh. The team named Red Bull Mugen Team Goh.
- Rookie Racing who previously operated by Cerumo, would run independently by themselves. The team get new title partner from NTT Communications, the team named NTT Communications ROOKIE.
- Team Impul runs new sponsorship from Itochu as they will run under black gold colour. The team rebranded as carenex Team Impul.

=== Driver changes ===
- Three-time and defending series champion Naoki Yamamoto moved to TCS Nakajima Racing after spending two seasons with Dandelion Racing. This was Yamamoto's first time driving for Nakajima Racing since his rookie season in 2010. While Tadasuke Makino moved to Docomo Team Dandelion Racing after two seasons with Nakajima Racing.
- Hiroki Otsu gets a full time seat after an appearance in the last round in 2020, as he raced with Red Bull Mugen Team Goh.
- 2019 series champion Nick Cassidy has exited the series, following his move to the FIA Formula E World Championship with Envision Virgin Racing. Cassidy's replacement is Super Formula Lights champion Ritomo Miyata, who race for two races in 2020 in relief of Kazuki Nakajima.
- Two-time series champion Hiroaki Ishiura has retired from the series. With reigning Formula Regional Japanese Champion Sena Sakaguchi picked as Ishiura's replacementfor P.mu/Cerumo・INGING.
- Yves Baltas was scheduled to compete for B-Max Racing, but did not enter any rounds.

=== Mid-season changes ===
- Kamui Kobayashi: missed all but the sixth round at Motegi due to commitments in the WEC and IMSA. Kazuto Kotaka was his replacement.
- Sacha Fenestraz missed the first five rounds because of visa issues. Yuichi Nakayama was his replacement.
- Tadasuke Makino missed the first two rounds of the season due to a his recovery from meningitis. Ukyo Sasahara was his replacement.
- Nobuharu Matsushita: joined B-Max Racing from the second round at Suzuka. He was initially denied an engine lease from Honda, after signing a factory racing contract with Nissan in the Super GT Series. This prevented him from racing in the opening round at Fuji. Honda would reverse their decision after Masaya Nagai replaced Hiroshi Shimizu as the Director of Motorsport at Honda.
- Kazuki Nakajima missed both Suzuka rounds, Autopolis, SUGO, and the fifth round at Motegi. Giuliano Alesi was his replacement.
- Tatiana Calderon missed Autopolis, Sugo, and the fifth round at Motegi (was able to participate in the April Suzuka round because of local regulations with her licence, which is from the ACC, the Colombian ASN of the FIA, unlike the Japanese drivers, who have JAF licences). Koudai Tsukakoshi was her replacement for the third to the fifth round.
- Ryo Hirakawa missed the SUGO round because he was tested TGR WEC car and not make in time for quarantine. Mitsunori Takaboshi covers for him.

== Race calendar ==
The provisional calendar was announced on 6 August 2020. After heavy disruptions to the 2020 season due to the COVID-19 pandemic, the series returned to a more traditional schedule, with Suzuka Circuit hosting the season finale as it was usual. On 12 April 2021, the organisation announced the cancellation of the Okayama round, which was due to be held in the first week of October. Instead, a second round at Motegi was confirmed.

Round	Circuit	Date
1	Fuji Speedway	4 April
2	Suzuka International Racing Course	25 April
3	Autopolis	16 May
4	Sportsland SUGO	20 June
5	Twin Ring Motegi	29 August
6	Twin Ring Motegi	17 October
7	Suzuka International Racing Course	31 October

== Results ==
=== Season summary ===
Round	Circuit	Pole Position	Fastest Lap	Winning driver	Winning team
1	Fuji Speedway	(Japan) Tomoki Nojiri	(Japan) Toshiki Oyu	(Japan) Tomoki Nojiri	(Japan) Team Mugen
2	Suzuka International Racing Course	(Japan) Nirei Fukuzumi	(Japan) Hiroki Otsu	(Japan) Tomoki Nojiri	(Japan) Team Mugen
3	Autopolis	(France) Giuliano Alesi	(Japan) Tomoki Nojiri	(France) Giuliano Alesi	(Japan) Kuo Vantelin Team TOM’S
4	Sportsland SUGO	(Japan) Yuhi Sekiguchi	(Japan) Tomoki Nojiri	(Japan) Nirei Fukuzumi	(Japan) Docomo Team Dandelion Racing
5	Twin Ring Motegi	(Japan) Tomoki Nojiri	(Japan) Yuhi Sekiguchi	(Japan) Tomoki Nojiri	(Japan) Team Mugen
6	Twin Ring Motegi	(Japan) Hiroki Otsu	(Japan) Toshiki Oyu	(Japan) Hiroki Otsu	(Japan) Red Bull Mugen Team Goh
7	Suzuka International Racing Course	(Japan) Nobuharu Matsushita	(Japan) Tomoki Nojiri	(Japan) Nirei Fukuzumi	(Japan) Docomo Team Dandelion Racing

== Championship standings ==
Race points

Position	1st	2nd	3rd	4th	5th	6th	7th	8th	9th	10th
Points	20	15	11	8	6	5	4	3	2	1

Qualifying points

Position	1st	2nd	3rd
Points	3	2	1

=== Drivers' Championship ===
==== Overall ====
Pos	Driver	FUJ	SUZ1	AUT (Note: The race was stopped due to bad weather conditions after less than 75% of laps were completed. Therefore, half points were awarded.)	SUG	MOT	MOT2	SUZ2	Points
1	(Japan) Tomoki Nojiri	1^{1}	1^{2}	5	6	1^{1}	5^{3}	3	86
2	(Japan) Nirei Fukuzumi	3	Ret^{1}	13	1	Ret	12	1^{3}	55
3	(Japan) Yuhi Sekiguchi	17†	4	10	3^{1}	2^{2}	4	4	55
4	(Japan) Ryō Hirakawa	4	2	Ret		4	Ret	2	46
5	(Japan) Toshiki Oyu	2^{2}	10^{3}	7	2	6	14	11^{2}	41
6	(Japan) Hiroki Otsu	16	5	6	10	10	1^{1}	5	38.5
7	(Japan) Sena Sakaguchi	9	11	2^{3}	8^{3}	5	2	13	35.5
8	(Japan) Nobuharu Matsushita		13	3	4	3^{3}	6	12^{1}	33.5
9	(Japan) Tadasuke Makino			14	5^{2}	7	3	10	24
10	(Japan) Ritomo Miyata	7	6	4^{2}	7	8	9	14	22
11	(France) Giuliano Alesi		9	1^{1}	9	16		8	20
12	(Japan) Ukyo Sasahara	5^{3}	3						18
13	(Japan) Naoki Yamamoto	6	8	9	12	12	Ret^{2}	9	13
14	(Japan) Kenta Yamashita	12	12	11	14	15	8	6	8
15	(Japan) Sho Tsuboi	Ret	7	Ret	15	9	Ret	16	6
16	(Japan) Kazuki Nakajima	11					7		4
17	(France) Sacha Fenestraz						13	7	4
18	(Japan) Yuji Kunimoto	8	Ret	Ret	13	11	Ret	15	3
19	(Japan) Kazuya Oshima	10	15	8	18	Ret	11	17	2.5
20	(Japan) Kamui Kobayashi						10		1
21	(Japan) Mitsunori Takaboshi				11				0
22	(Japan) Koudai Tsukakoshi			12	16	Ret			0
23	(Japan) Yuichi Nakayama	14	14	15	Ret	13			0
24	(Colombia) Tatiana Calderón	13	17				Ret	19	0
25	(Japan) Kazuto Kotaka	15	16	16†	17	14		18	0
Pos	Driver	FUJ	SUZ1	AUT	SUG	MOT	MOT2	SUZ2	Points

=== Teams' championship ===
Pos	Team	No.	FUJ	SUZ1	AUT	SUG	MOT	MOT2	SUZ2	Points
1	carenex Team Impul	19	17†	4	10	3	2	4	4	88
1	carenex Team Impul	20	4	2	Ret	11	4	Ret	2	88
2	Docomo Team Dandelion Racing	5	3	Ret	13	1	Ret	12	1	86
2	Docomo Team Dandelion Racing	6	5	3	14	5	7	3	10	86
3	Team Mugen	16	1	1	5	6	1	5	3	77
4	TCS Nakajima Racing	1	6	8	9	12	12	Ret	9	47
4	TCS Nakajima Racing	64	2	10	7	2	6	14	11	47
5	P.mu/Cerumo・INGING	38	Ret	7	Ret	15	9	Ret	16	37.5
5	P.mu/Cerumo・INGING	39	9	11	2	8	5	2	13	37.5
6	Kuo Vantelin Team TOM’S	36	11	9	1	9	16	7	8	37
6	Kuo Vantelin Team TOM’S	37	7	6	4	7	8	9	14	37
7	Red Bull Mugen Team Goh	15	16	5	6	10	10	1	5	35.5
8	B-Max Racing	51		13	3	4	3	6	12	29.5
9	Kondo Racing	3	12	12	11	14	15	8	6	12
9	Kondo Racing	4	14	14	15	Ret	13	13	7	12
10	carrozzeria Team KCMG	7	15	16	16†	17	14	10	18	4
10	carrozzeria Team KCMG	18	8	Ret	Ret	13	11	Ret	15	4
11	NTT Communications ROOKIE	14	10	15	8	18	Ret	11	17	2.5
12	Drago Corse with ThreeBond	12	13	17	12	16	Ret	Ret	19	0
Pos	Driver		FUJ	SUZ1	AUT	SUG	MOT	MOT2	SUZ2	Points
