= 2019 Super Taikyu Series =

Car racing series

The 2019 Super Taikyu Series is the 28th season of the Super Taikyu Series. The season will start on 23 March at Suzuka Circuit and end on 10 November at Okayama International Circuit.

Regining Champion No.1 GTNET Motorsport Nissan GTR GT3 becomes the 2019 Super Taikyu Series Champion and the 2019 Fuji 24 Hours Winner

== Class Champions ==
Bold drivers indicate a driver that was entered in every race for their respective team. Drivers listed in italics competed in a select number of rounds for their respective team.

Class	Team	Vehicle	Drivers
ST-X (FIA GT3)	(Japan) GTNET Motor Sports (Rd. 1-4, 6)	Nissan GT-R NISMO GT3	(Japan) Teruhiko Hamano (Japan) Kazuki Hoshino (Japan) Kiyoto Fujinami (Japan) Kazuki Hiramine (Rd. 3)
ST-Z (FIA GT4)	(Japan) Endless Sports	Mercedes-AMG GT4	(Japan) Yudai Uchida (Japan) Hideki Yamauchi (Japan) Tsubasa Takahashi (Japan) Shinnosuke Yamada (Rd. 3)
ST-TCR	(Japan) Floral Racing with Uematsu	Audi RS 3 LMS TCR	(Japan) Takeshi Matsumoto (Japan) Takuro Shinohara (Japan) "Hirobon" (Rd.1) (Japan) Yuya Ohta (Rd. 2-6) (Japan) Kouichi Okumura (Rd. 3)

== Teams and drivers ==
Entrant	Vehicle	No	Drivers	Rounds
ST–X
(Japan) GTNET Motor Sports	Nissan GT-R Nismo GT3	1	(Japan) Kiyoto Fujinami	1–4, 6
(Japan) GTNET Motor Sports	Nissan GT-R Nismo GT3	1	(Japan) Teruhiko Hamano	1–4, 6
(Japan) GTNET Motor Sports	Nissan GT-R Nismo GT3	1	(Japan) Kazuki Hoshino	1–4, 6
(Japan) GTNET Motor Sports	Nissan GT-R Nismo GT3	1	(Japan) Kazuki Hiramine	3
(Japan) MP Racing	Nissan GT-R Nismo GT3	9	(Japan) Keiichi Inoue	5–6
(Japan) MP Racing	Nissan GT-R Nismo GT3	9	(Japan) Masami Kageyama	All
(Japan) MP Racing	Nissan GT-R Nismo GT3	9	(Japan) Yusaku Shibata	All
(Japan) MP Racing	Nissan GT-R Nismo GT3	9	(Japan) Joe Shindo	All
(Japan) MP Racing	Nissan GT-R Nismo GT3	9	(Japan) Takumi Takata	3
(Japan) MP Racing	Nissan GT-R Nismo GT3	9	(Japan) Ryuichiro Tomita	1, 3
(Hong Kong) X Works	Audi R8 LMS	83	(Hong Kong) Marchy Lee	3
(Hong Kong) X Works	Audi R8 LMS	83	(Japan) Sean Shinya Michimi	1-4
(Hong Kong) X Works	Audi R8 LMS	83	(Hong Kong) Philip Tang	1–5
(Hong Kong) X Works	Audi R8 LMS	83	(Hong Kong) Smart Tse Ka Hing	1–5
(Hong Kong) X Works	Audi R8 LMS	83	(Hong Kong) Shaun Thong	3, 5
(Japan) Sato-SS Sports	Mercedes-AMG GT3	112	(Japan) Yūya Motojima	1, 4, 6
(Japan) Sato-SS Sports	Mercedes-AMG GT3	112	(Japan) Atsushi Sato	1, 4, 6
(Japan) Sato-SS Sports	Mercedes-AMG GT3	112	(Japan) Ryosei Yamashita	1, 4, 6
(Japan) MAX Racing	Lexus RC F GT3	244	(Japan) Kimiya Sato	1-2, 4-6
(Japan) MAX Racing	Lexus RC F GT3	244	(Japan) Tetsuya Tanaka	1-2, 4-6
(Japan) MAX Racing	Lexus RC F GT3	244	(Japan) Toru Tanaka	1-2, 4-6
(Japan) Tairoku Racing	Nissan GT-R Nismo GT3	300	(Brazil) Nicolas Costa	1–3
(Japan) Tairoku Racing	Nissan GT-R Nismo GT3	300	(United Kingdom) Harrison Newey	1–3
(Japan) Tairoku Racing	Nissan GT-R Nismo GT3	300	(Japan) Shinichi Takagi	1–3
(Japan) Tairoku Racing	Nissan GT-R Nismo GT3	300	(Japan) Tairoku Yamaguchi	1–3
(Japan) Tairoku Racing	Nissan GT-R Nismo GT3	300	(Japan) Satoshi Motoyama	3
(Japan) D'station Racing	Aston Martin Vantage AMR GT3	777	(Japan) Tomonobu Fujii	4–6
(Japan) D'station Racing	Aston Martin Vantage AMR GT3	777	(Japan) Satoshi Hoshino	1–2, 4-6
(Japan) D'station Racing	Aston Martin Vantage AMR GT3	777	(Japan) Tsubasa Kondo	1–2, 4-6
(Japan) D'station Racing	Aston Martin Vantage AMR GT3	777	(United Kingdom) Darren Turner	1–2
ST–Z
KTM Cars Japan	KTM X-Bow GT4	2	(Japan) Taiyo Ida	All
KTM Cars Japan	KTM X-Bow GT4	2	(Japan) Hiroki Katoh	All
KTM Cars Japan	KTM X-Bow GT4	2	(Japan) Kazuho Takahashi	All
KTM Cars Japan	KTM X-Bow GT4	2	(Japan) Takashi Kobayashi	3
KTM Cars Japan	KTM X-Bow GT4	2	(Japan) Hiroshi Hamaguchi	3
(Japan) Endless Sports	Mercedes-AMG GT4	3	(Japan) Tsubasa Takahashi	All
(Japan) Endless Sports	Mercedes-AMG GT4	3	(Japan) Yudai Uchida	All
(Japan) Endless Sports	Mercedes-AMG GT4	3	(Japan) Hideki Yamauchi	All
(Japan) Endless Sports	Mercedes-AMG GT4	3	(Japan) Shinnosuke Yamada	3
(Japan) Techno First	Ginetta G55 GT4	35	(Japan) Keishi Ishikawa	1–2
(Japan) Techno First	Ginetta G55 GT4	35	(Japan) Satoshi Motoyama	1–2
(Japan) Techno First	Ginetta G55 GT4	35	(Japan) Masaki Kano	4
(Japan) Techno First	Ginetta G55 GT4	35	(Japan) Shintaro Kawabata	6
(Japan) Techno First	Ginetta G55 GT4	35	(Japan) Keisuke Kinoshita	4, 6
(Japan) Techno First	Ginetta G55 GT4	35	(Japan) Hironobu Yasuda	4, 6
(Japan) Techno First	Ginetta G55 GT4	35	(Japan) Masaki Tanaka	1–2, 4, 6
(Japan) BEND	Porsche Cayman GT4 Clubsport MR	51	(Japan) Kouhei Fukuda	3
(Japan) BEND	Porsche Cayman GT4 Clubsport MR	51	(Japan) Daisuke Ikeda	3
(Japan) BEND	Porsche Cayman GT4 Clubsport MR	51	(Japan) Masamitsu Ishihara	3
(Japan) BEND	Porsche Cayman GT4 Clubsport MR	51	(Japan) Yuya Sakamoto	3
(Japan) BEND	Porsche Cayman GT4 Clubsport MR	51	(Japan) Atsusi Yogo	3
(Japan) Birth Racing Project	Mercedes-AMG GT4	190	(Japan) Hisamori Hayashi	1
(Japan) Birth Racing Project	Mercedes-AMG GT4	190	(Japan) Akira Mizutani	1–2, 4–6
(Japan) Birth Racing Project	Mercedes-AMG GT4	190	(Japan) Koichi Okumura	1–2, 4–6
(Japan) Birth Racing Project	Mercedes-AMG GT4	190	(Japan) Daisuke Yamawaki	1–2, 4–6
(Japan) Team 5ZIGEN	Mercedes-AMG GT4	500	(Japan) Takayuki Aoki	6
(Japan) Team 5ZIGEN	Mercedes-AMG GT4	500	(Japan) Takashi Oi	6
(Japan) Team 5ZIGEN	Mercedes-AMG GT4	500	(Japan) Yuya Sakamoto	6
ST–TCR
(Japan) Adenau	Volkswagen Golf GTI TCR	10	(France) Philippe Devesa	All
(Japan) Adenau	Volkswagen Golf GTI TCR	10	(Japan) Shogo Mitsuyama	All
(Japan) Adenau	Volkswagen Golf GTI TCR	10	(Australia) Jake Parsons	1, 3–6
(Japan) Adenau	Volkswagen Golf GTI TCR	10	(Japan) Juichi Wakisaka	3
(Japan) Birth Racing Project	Audi RS 3 LMS TCR	19	(Japan) “Hirobon”	1, 3
(Japan) Birth Racing Project	Audi RS 3 LMS TCR	19	(Japan) Takeshi Matsumoto	All
(Japan) Birth Racing Project	Audi RS 3 LMS TCR	19	(Japan) Takuro Shinohara	All
(Japan) Birth Racing Project	Audi RS 3 LMS TCR	19	(Japan) Yuya Oota	2–6
(Japan) Birth Racing Project	Audi RS 3 LMS TCR	19	(Japan) Kouichi Okumura	3
(Japan) Waimarama Kizuna Racing Team	Audi RS 3 LMS TCR	22	(Japan) Katsumasa Chiyo	2–6
(Japan) Waimarama Kizuna Racing Team	Audi RS 3 LMS TCR	22	(Japan) Kazutomo Robert Hori	2–6
(Japan) Waimarama Kizuna Racing Team	Audi RS 3 LMS TCR	22	(Japan) "Kizuna"	2–6
(Japan) Waimarama Kizuna Racing Team	Audi RS 3 LMS TCR	22	(South Korea) Lee Jung-woo	3, 5–6
(Japan) Waimarama Kizuna Racing Team	Audi RS 3 LMS TCR	22	(Japan) Naoya Yamano	3
(Japan) Waimarama Kizuna Racing Team	Audi RS 3 LMS TCR	22	(Japan) Hironobu Yasuda	3
Audi driving experience Japan	Audi RS 3 LMS TCR	33	(Japan) Masaki Ano	5
Audi driving experience Japan	Audi RS 3 LMS TCR	33	(Japan) Ryuichiro Tomita	5
Audi driving experience Japan	Audi RS 3 LMS TCR	33	(Japan) Masataka Yanagida	5
(Japan) Team DreamDrive	Audi RS 3 LMS TCR	45	(Japan) Yoshiyuki Okumura	3
(Japan) Team DreamDrive	Audi RS 3 LMS TCR	45	(Japan) Takuya Shirasaka	All
(Japan) Team DreamDrive	Audi RS 3 LMS TCR	45	(Japan) Shozo Tagahara	All
(Japan) Team DreamDrive	Audi RS 3 LMS TCR	45	(Japan) Naoto Takeda	All
(Japan) Audi Team Mars	Audi RS 3 LMS TCR	65	(Japan) Daisuke Imamura	All
(Japan) Audi Team Mars	Audi RS 3 LMS TCR	65	(Japan) Masanobu Kato	All
(Japan) Audi Team Mars	Audi RS 3 LMS TCR	65	(Japan) Masato Shimoyama	All
(Japan) Audi Team Mars	Audi RS 3 LMS TCR	65	(Japan) Taketoshi Matsui	3–5
(Japan) Audi Team Mars	Audi RS 3 LMS TCR	65	(Japan) Hideaki Okajima	1–3, 6
(Japan) Team Noah	Honda Civic Type R TCR (FK8)	75	(Japan) Kuniyuki Haga	1, 3
(Japan) Team Noah	Honda Civic Type R TCR (FK8)	75	(Japan) Yuji Kiyotaki	1, 3–6
(Japan) Team Noah	Honda Civic Type R TCR (FK8)	75	(Japan) Kazuyuki Matsumoto	3, 5
(Japan) Team Noah	Honda Civic Type R TCR (FK8)	75	(Japan) Genki Nishimura	3
(Japan) Team Noah	Honda Civic Type R TCR (FK8)	75	(Japan) Tatsuya Okahara	2
(Japan) Team Noah	Honda Civic Type R TCR (FK8)	75	(Japan) Yoshikazu Sobu	All
(Japan) Team Noah	Honda Civic Type R TCR (FK8)	75	(Japan) Toshiro Tsukada	All
(Japan) Team Noah	Honda Civic Type R TCR (FK8)	75	(Japan) Shingo Wada	6
(Japan) Modulo Racing with Dome	Honda Civic Type R TCR (FK8)	97	(Japan) Mitsuhiro Endō	All
(Japan) Modulo Racing with Dome	Honda Civic Type R TCR (FK8)	97	(Japan) Shinji Nakano	All
(Japan) Modulo Racing with Dome	Honda Civic Type R TCR (FK8)	97	(Japan) Hiroki Otsu	All
(Japan) Modulo Racing with Dome	Honda Civic Type R TCR (FK8)	97	(Japan) Tadao Uematsu	All
(Japan) Modulo Racing with Dome	Honda Civic Type R TCR (FK8)	97	(Japan) Tomoki Nojiri	3
(Japan) RFC Racing	Honda Civic Type R TCR (FK8)	108	(Japan) Jun Fujii	All
(Japan) RFC Racing	Honda Civic Type R TCR (FK8)	108	(Japan) Takahisa Oono	All
(Japan) RFC Racing	Honda Civic Type R TCR (FK8)	108	(Japan) Seiji Ara	3
(Japan) RFC Racing	Honda Civic Type R TCR (FK8)	108	(Japan) Toshio Suzuki	3
(Hong Kong) KCMG	Honda Civic Type R TCR (FK8)	501	(Australia) Josh Burdon	3, 5
(Hong Kong) KCMG	Honda Civic Type R TCR (FK8)	501	(United Kingdom) Matt Howson	1–4, 6
(Hong Kong) KCMG	Honda Civic Type R TCR (FK8)	501	(Hong Kong) Jim Ka To	1–4, 6
(Hong Kong) KCMG	Honda Civic Type R TCR (FK8)	501	(Hong Kong) Paul Ip	All
(Hong Kong) KCMG	Honda Civic Type R TCR (FK8)	501	(Hong Kong) Henry Lee Junior	5
(Hong Kong) KCMG	Honda Civic Type R TCR (FK8)	501	(Hungary) Attila Tassi	3
ST–1
(Japan) D'station Racing	Porsche 911 GT3 Cup	47	(Japan) Kenji Hama	All
(Japan) D'station Racing	Porsche 911 GT3 Cup	47	(Japan) Tatsuya Hoshino	All
(Japan) D'station Racing	Porsche 911 GT3 Cup	47	(Japan) Manabu Orido	All
(Japan) D'station Racing	Porsche 911 GT3 Cup	47	(Japan) Kenji Kobayashi	3
(Japan) D'station Racing	Porsche 911 GT3 Cup	47	(Japan) Tsubasa Kondo	3
(Japan) Tracy Sports	Audi R8 LMS Cup	998	(China) Simon Chen	1, 4–6
(Japan) Tracy Sports	Audi R8 LMS Cup	998	(China) Jason Zhang	1, 4–6
(Japan) Tracy Sports	Audi R8 LMS Cup	998	(China) Hans Wang	2–3
(Japan) Tracy Sports	Audi R8 LMS Cup	998	(Hong Kong) Jeffrey Zee	All
(Japan) Tracy Sports	Audi R8 LMS Cup	998	(China) Leo Ye	All
ST–2
(Japan) Shinryo Racing Team	Mitsubishi Lancer Evolution X	6	(Japan) Yoshiki Fujii	3
(Japan) Shinryo Racing Team	Mitsubishi Lancer Evolution X	6	(Japan) Wataru Yamaki	3
(Japan) Shinryo Racing Team	Mitsubishi Lancer Evolution X	6	(Japan) Yasushi Kikuchi	All
(Japan) Shinryo Racing Team	Mitsubishi Lancer Evolution X	6	(Japan) Masazumi Ohashi	All
(Japan) Shinryo Racing Team	Mitsubishi Lancer Evolution X	6	(Japan) Tomohiro Tomimasu	All
(Japan) Shinryo Racing Team	Mitsubishi Lancer Evolution X	7	(Japan) Keisuke Anzai	3, 5
(Japan) Shinryo Racing Team	Mitsubishi Lancer Evolution X	7	(Japan) Koji Endo	2, 4–6
(Japan) Shinryo Racing Team	Mitsubishi Lancer Evolution X	7	(Japan) Shingo Imai	3
(Japan) Shinryo Racing Team	Mitsubishi Lancer Evolution X	7	(Japan) Ichi Omeno	3
(Japan) Shinryo Racing Team	Mitsubishi Lancer Evolution X	7	(Japan) Masato Narisawa	All
(Japan) Shinryo Racing Team	Mitsubishi Lancer Evolution X	7	(Japan) Zene Okazaki	2–6
(Japan) Shinryo Racing Team	Mitsubishi Lancer Evolution X	7	(Japan) Asahi Turbo	4, 6
(Japan) Shinryo Racing Team	Mitsubishi Lancer Evolution X	7	(Japan) Wataru Yamaki	1–2
(Japan) Team Nopro	Mazda Axela Skyactiv-D	17	(Japan) Tatsuya Nogami	All
(Japan) Team Nopro	Mazda Axela Skyactiv-D	17	(Japan) Toshihiko Nogami	All
(Japan) Team Nopro	Mazda Axela Skyactiv-D	17	(Japan) Tobio Ohtani	All
(Japan) Team Nopro	Mazda Axela Skyactiv-D	17	(Japan) Tatsuya Tanigawa	All
(Japan) Team Nopro	Mazda Axela Skyactiv-D	17	(Japan) Keita Sawa	3
(Japan) TOWAINTEC Racing	Subaru Impreza WRX STI	59	(Japan) Hitoshi Goto	All
(Japan) TOWAINTEC Racing	Subaru Impreza WRX STI	59	(Japan) Takuto Iguchi	All
(Japan) TOWAINTEC Racing	Subaru Impreza WRX STI	59	(Japan) Mizuki Ishizaka	All
(Japan) TOWAINTEC Racing	Subaru Impreza WRX STI	59	(Japan) Manabu Osawa	All
(Japan) ATJ Racing-ST	Honda Civic (FK7)	63	(Japan) Takuya Fujisawa	6
(Japan) ATJ Racing-ST	Honda Civic (FK7)	63	(Japan) Itoda Tagawa Kazuaki	6
(Japan) ATJ Racing-ST	Honda Civic (FK7)	63	(Japan) Yū Kikuchi	6
(Japan) ATJ Racing-ST	Honda Civic (FK7)	63	(Japan) Kaoru Inoshita	6
(Japan) Honda R&D Challenge	Honda Civic Type-R (FK8)	743	(Japan) Hideki Kakinuma	5–6
(Japan) Honda R&D Challenge	Honda Civic Type-R (FK8)	743	(Japan) Junichi Kidate	5–6
(Japan) Honda R&D Challenge	Honda Civic Type-R (FK8)	743	(Japan) Tetsuaki Mochisuki	5–6
(Japan) Honda R&D Challenge	Honda Civic Type-R (FK8)	743	(Japan) Hitoshi Sesai	5
ST–3
(Japan) Okabe Jidosha Motorsport	Nissan Fairlady Z (Z34)	14	(Japan) Isao Ihashi	All
(Japan) Okabe Jidosha Motorsport	Nissan Fairlady Z (Z34)	14	(Japan) Ataka Mitsunori	All
(Japan) Okabe Jidosha Motorsport	Nissan Fairlady Z (Z34)	14	(Japan) Manabu Yamazaki	All
(Japan) Okabe Jidosha Motorsport	Nissan Fairlady Z (Z34)	14	(Japan) Yuuga Katsumata	3
(Japan) Okabe Jidosha Motorsport	Nissan Fairlady Z (Z34)	14	(Japan) Toshiaki Koshimizu	3
(Japan) Okabe Jidosha Motorsport	Nissan Fairlady Z (Z34)	14	(Japan) Isamu Tabata	3
(Japan) Okabe Jidosha Motorsport	Nissan Fairlady Z (Z34)	15	(Japan) Naohiro Furuya	All
(Japan) Okabe Jidosha Motorsport	Nissan Fairlady Z (Z34)	15	(Japan) Kazuomi Komatsu	All
(Japan) Okabe Jidosha Motorsport	Nissan Fairlady Z (Z34)	15	(Japan) Masaaki Nagashima	All
(Japan) Okabe Jidosha Motorsport	Nissan Fairlady Z (Z34)	15	(Japan) Tomoaki Ichimori	1, 4
(Japan) Okabe Jidosha Motorsport	Nissan Fairlady Z (Z34)	15	(Japan) Masaya Kouno	3, 5–6
(Japan) Okabe Jidosha Motorsport	Nissan Fairlady Z (Z34)	15	(Japan) Jun Tashiro	2–3
(Japan) Techno First	Lexus RC350	34	(Japan) Shuji Maejima	All
(Japan) Techno First	Lexus RC350	34	(Japan) Riki Okusa	All
(Japan) Techno First	Lexus RC350	34	(Japan) Yuya Tezuka	All
(Japan) Techno First	Lexus RC350	34	(Japan) Takao Onishi	3
(Japan) Tracy Sports	Lexus RC350	38	(Japan) Makoto Hotta	All
(Japan) Tracy Sports	Lexus RC350	38	(Japan) Ryohei Sakaguchi	All
(Japan) Tracy Sports	Lexus RC350	38	(Japan) Yuui Tsutsumi	All
(Japan) Tracy Sports	Lexus RC350	38	(Japan) Morio Nitta	3
(Japan) Tracy Sports	Lexus RC350	39	(Japan) Sesshu Kondo	All
(Japan) Tracy Sports	Lexus RC350	39	(Japan) Kazuya Shimogaki	All
(Japan) Tracy Sports	Lexus RC350	39	(Japan) Syuma Hiroshima	3
(Japan) Tracy Sports	Lexus RC350	39	(Japan) Hirohito Ito	3
(Japan) Tracy Sports	Lexus RC350	39	(Japan) Takayuki Ōi	1
(Japan) Tracy Sports	Lexus RC350	39	(Japan) Takuya Otaki	1
(Japan) Tracy Sports	Lexus RC350	39	(Japan) Kazuya Oshima	2–6
(Japan) Tracy Sports	Lexus IS350	41	(Japan) Shinichi Hyodo	4
(Japan) Tracy Sports	Lexus IS350	41	(Japan) Masafumi Inada	4
(Japan) Tracy Sports	Lexus IS350	41	(Japan) Hironao Ishii	4
(Japan) Tracy Sports	Lexus IS350	41	(Japan) Kazuhiro Ito	4
(Japan) Le Beausset Motorsports	Lexus RC350	62	(Japan) Ryō Hirakawa	4, 6
(Japan) Le Beausset Motorsports	Lexus RC350	62	(Japan) Ryo Ogawa	All
(Japan) Le Beausset Motorsports	Lexus RC350	62	(Japan) Koki Saga	All
(Japan) Le Beausset Motorsports	Lexus RC350	62	(Japan) Kenta Yamashita	1–3, 5
(Japan) Saitama Toyopet GreenBrave	Toyota Mark X	68	(Japan) Taku Bamba	3
(Japan) Saitama Toyopet GreenBrave	Toyota Mark X	68	(Japan) Takayuki Hiranuma	3
(Japan) Saitama Toyopet GreenBrave	Toyota Mark X	68	(Japan) Naoki Hattori	All
(Japan) Saitama Toyopet GreenBrave	Toyota Mark X	68	(Japan) Shigekazu Wakisaka	All
(Japan) Saitama Toyopet GreenBrave	Toyota Mark X	68	(Japan) Hiroki Yoshida	All
ST–4
(Spain) Tracy Sports SPV Racing	Toyota 86	5	(Japan) Takayuki Aoki	5
(Spain) Tracy Sports SPV Racing	Toyota 86	5	(Japan) Masahiro Aoi	6
(Spain) Tracy Sports SPV Racing	Toyota 86	5	(Japan) Ayumu Iwasa	6
(Spain) Tracy Sports SPV Racing	Toyota 86	5	(Japan) Takeshi Ito	1
(Spain) Tracy Sports SPV Racing	Toyota 86	5	(Japan) Jun Tashiro	1
(Spain) Tracy Sports SPV Racing	Toyota 86	5	(Malaysia) Kenny Lee Wan Yuen	3
(Spain) Tracy Sports SPV Racing	Toyota 86	5	(Singapore) Roy Tang Tien Foo	3
(Spain) Tracy Sports SPV Racing	Toyota 86	5	(Japan) Ryo Yamada	3
(Spain) Tracy Sports SPV Racing	Toyota 86	5	(Japan) Yuki Mishima	All
(Spain) Tracy Sports SPV Racing	Toyota 86	5	(Japan) Ryuta Ukai	1–5
(Spain) Tracy Sports SPV Racing	Toyota 86	5	(Japan) Kengo Yamamoto	2–5
(Japan) APROS Racing	Toyota GRMN Vitz Turbo	8	(Japan) Takashi Azuma	1, 3–6
(Japan) APROS Racing	Toyota GRMN Vitz Turbo	8	(Japan) Mitsuaki Matsuo	All
(Japan) APROS Racing	Toyota GRMN Vitz Turbo	8	(Japan) Kazunari Yoshioka	All
(Japan) APROS Racing	Toyota GRMN Vitz Turbo	8	(Japan) Hideyoshi Nishizawa	3
(Japan) APROS Racing	Toyota GRMN Vitz Turbo	8	(Japan) Jyunichi Uematsu	3–5
(Japan) APROS Racing	Toyota GRMN Vitz Turbo	8	(Japan) Ryuta Ukai	2
(Japan) APROS Racing	Toyota GRMN Vitz Turbo	8	(Japan) Yuichi Yokoo	1, 3
(Japan) Endless Sports	Toyota 86	13	(Japan) Naoya Gamou	3–6
(Japan) Endless Sports	Toyota 86	13	(Japan) Ritomo Miyata	2–6
(Japan) Endless Sports	Toyota 86	13	(Japan) Yuki Nakayama	2–6
(Japan) Endless Sports	Toyota 86	13	(Japan) Togo Suganami	3
(Japan) Asano Racing Service	Toyota 86	18	(Japan) Takeo Asano	All
(Japan) Asano Racing Service	Toyota 86	18	(Japan) Daiki Fujiwara	All
(Japan) Asano Racing Service	Toyota 86	18	(Japan) Masataka Inoue	All
(Japan) Asano Racing Service	Toyota 86	18	(Japan) Masayuki Mori	1
(Japan) Asano Racing Service	Toyota 86	18	(Japan) Kazunori Nishimura	3
(Japan) Asano Racing Service	Toyota 86	18	(Japan) Harutomo Okano	2
(Japan) Asano Racing Service	Toyota 86	18	(Japan) Tomomitsu Seno	5
(Japan) Asano Racing Service	Toyota 86	18	(Japan) Toshikazu Shiba	4, 6
(Japan) T’s Concept	Toyota 86	28	(Japan) Tohjiro Azuma	All
(Japan) T’s Concept	Toyota 86	28	(Japan) “Daisuke”	All
(Japan) T’s Concept	Toyota 86	28	(Japan) Takaki Hamada	1, 3–5
(Japan) T’s Concept	Toyota 86	28	(Japan) Kazuto Kotaka	2–5
(Japan) T’s Concept	Toyota 86	28	(Japan) Shunsuke Kohno	3
(Japan) T’s Concept	Toyota 86	28	(Japan) Tetsuya Moriyama	3, 6
(Japan) TC Corse	Mazda Roadster (ND)	54	(Japan) "Atrian"	6
(Japan) TC Corse	Mazda Roadster (ND)	54	(Japan) Koichi Ishii	4–6
(Japan) TC Corse	Mazda Roadster (ND)	54	(Japan) Teruaki Kato	1–2, 4–6
(Japan) TC Corse	Mazda Roadster (ND)	54	(Japan) Kenichi Ohara	4–5
(Japan) TOM'S Spirit	Toyota 86	86	(Japan) Takamitsu Matsui	All
(Japan) TOM'S Spirit	Toyota 86	86	(Japan) Sho Tsuboi	All
(Japan) TOM'S Spirit	Toyota 86	86	(Japan) Yuichi Nakayama	1, 3–6
(Japan) TOM'S Spirit	Toyota 86	86	(Japan) Kazuya Oshima	2
(Japan) TOM'S Spirit	Toyota 86	86	(Japan) Kimiya Sato	3
(Japan) Rookie Racing	Toyota 86	104	(Japan) Akira Iida	1–2
(Japan) Rookie Racing	Toyota 86	104	(Japan) Yasuhiro Ogura	All
(Japan) Rookie Racing	Toyota 86	104	(Japan) Daisuke Toyoda	All
(Japan) Rookie Racing	Toyota 86	104	(Japan) Hiroaki Ishiura	3
(Japan) Rookie Racing	Toyota 86	104	(Japan) Kazuya Oshima	3
(Japan) Rookie Racing	Toyota 86	104	(Japan) Masahiro Sasaki	3–6
(Japan) Kyaputen Harokku Racing Team	Honda S2000	116	(Japan) Youtarou Akaboshi	1–3, 5–6
(Japan) Kyaputen Harokku Racing Team	Honda S2000	116	(Japan) Nobuyuki Yoshida	1–3, 5–6
(Japan) Kyaputen Harokku Racing Team	Honda S2000	116	(Japan) Yasuhiro Ogusi	3–4
(Japan) Kyaputen Harokku Racing Team	Honda S2000	116	(Japan) Tetsuya Syutou	3–4
(Japan) Kyaputen Harokku Racing Team	Honda S2000	116	(Japan) Ryuuichirou Ootsuka	All
(Japan) Kyaputen Harokku Racing Team	Honda S2000	116	(Japan) Oji Semba	All
(Japan) C.S.I Racing	Toyota 86	310	(Japan) Shinya Hosokawa	All
(Japan) C.S.I Racing	Toyota 86	310	(Japan) Rintaro Kubo	All
(Japan) C.S.I Racing	Toyota 86	310	(Japan) Yuki Nemoto	3
(Japan) C.S.I Racing	Toyota 86	310	(Japan) Hirokazu Suzuki	3, 5–6
(Japan) C.S.I Racing	Toyota 86	310	(Japan) Rei Yamaguchi	1–4
(Japan) Glory Racing with A-One	Honda Civic Type-R (FN2)	333	(Japan) Tsukihiro Hirota	6
(Japan) Glory Racing with A-One	Honda Civic Type-R (FN2)	333	(Japan) Kazutoshi Narita	6
(Japan) Glory Racing with A-One	Honda Civic Type-R (FN2)	333	(Japan) Yusuke Tomibayashi	6
(Japan) Hayashi Terenpu SHADE Racing	Toyota 86	884	(Japan) Hiro Hayashi	All
(Japan) Hayashi Terenpu SHADE Racing	Toyota 86	884	(Japan) Katsuyuki Hiranaka	All
(Japan) Hayashi Terenpu SHADE Racing	Toyota 86	884	(Japan) Yuji Kunimoto	All
(Japan) Hayashi Terenpu SHADE Racing	Toyota 86	884	(Japan) Keishi Ishikawa	3–6
ST–5
(Japan) Team Bride	Honda Fit 3	4	(Japan) Seijiro Aihara	6
(Japan) Team Bride	Honda Fit 3	4	(Japan) Karuros Honda	3–4, 6
(Japan) Team Bride	Honda Fit 3	4	(Japan) Hiroshi Ito	3
(Japan) Team Bride	Honda Fit 3	4	(Japan) Rina Ito	3
(Japan) Team Bride	Honda Fit 3	4	(Japan) Souichi Kurosu	3
(Japan) Team Bride	Honda Fit 3	4	(Japan) Hidefumi Minami	All
(Japan) Team Bride	Honda Fit 3	4	(Japan) Shunsuke Sato	All
(Japan) Team Bride	Honda Fit 3	4	(Japan) Hideo Morio	1
(Japan) Team Bride	Honda Fit 3	4	(Japan) Tetsuya Moriyama	1–2
(Japan) Team Bride	Honda Fit 3	4	(Japan) Tomomitsu Senoo	4, 6
(Japan) Blood Sports	Toyota Vitz	11	(Japan) Takahiro Miki	6
(Japan) Blood Sports	Toyota Vitz	11	(Japan) Takao Oo	6
(Japan) Blood Sports	Toyota Vitz	11	(Japan) Masashi Tojo	6
(Japan) Blood Sports	Toyota Vitz	103	(Japan) Tomiichi Hayashi	6
(Japan) Blood Sports	Toyota Vitz	103	(Japan) Masahiro Iwase	6
(Japan) Blood Sports	Toyota Vitz	103	(Japan) Yoichi Nishino	6
(Japan) Team Nopro	Mazda Demio Skyactiv-D	37	(Japan) Yoshinari Fujiwara	2–4, 6
(Japan) Team Nopro	Mazda Demio Skyactiv-D	37	(Japan) Kaoru Ijiri	All
(Japan) Team Nopro	Mazda Demio Skyactiv-D	37	(Japan) Yoshihiro Kato	3
(Japan) Team Nopro	Mazda Demio Skyactiv-D	37	(Japan) Yutaka Seki	1, 3
(Japan) Team Nopro	Mazda Demio Skyactiv-D	37	(Japan) Kazundo Tsuji	1–4, 6
(Japan) Team Nopro	Mazda Demio Skyactiv-D	37	(Japan) Horoo Yamamoto	3, 5
(Japan) Love Drive Racing	Mazda Roadster (ND)	50	(Japan) Marie Iwaoka	All
(Japan) Love Drive Racing	Mazda Roadster (ND)	50	(Japan) Sayaka Kato	1–4
(Japan) Love Drive Racing	Mazda Roadster (ND)	50	(Japan) Hiroko Komatsu	1–4
(Japan) Love Drive Racing	Mazda Roadster (ND)	50	(Japan) Aika Kumashita	3
(Japan) Love Drive Racing	Mazda Roadster (ND)	50	(Japan) Rika Nakamura	1–3
(Japan) Love Drive Racing	Mazda Roadster (ND)	50	(Japan) Jyunko Fujii	3–4
(Japan) Love Drive Racing	Mazda Roadster (ND)	78	(Japan) Jyunko Fujii	1
(Japan) Love Drive Racing	Mazda Roadster (ND)	78	(Japan) Tomoya Kato	3
(Japan) Love Drive Racing	Mazda Roadster (ND)	78	(Japan) Takahiro Kimura	3
(Japan) Love Drive Racing	Mazda Roadster (ND)	78	(Japan) Hideshi Matsuda	3
(Japan) Love Drive Racing	Mazda Roadster (ND)	78	(Japan) Rika Nakamura	4
(Japan) Love Drive Racing	Mazda Roadster (ND)	78	(Japan) Yugo Ohsaki	All
(Japan) Love Drive Racing	Mazda Roadster (ND)	78	(Japan) Ryohei Tanaka	1–4
(Japan) Love Drive Racing	Mazda Roadster (ND)	78	(Japan) Koji Yamanishi	2–6
(Japan) Over Drive	Mazda Roadster (ND)	66	(Japan) Riku Hashimoto	All
(Japan) Over Drive	Mazda Roadster (ND)	66	(Japan) Takayuki Takechi	All
(Japan) Over Drive	Mazda Roadster (ND)	66	(Japan) Katsuhiko Tsutsui	1–5
(Japan) Over Drive	Mazda Roadster (ND)	66	(Japan) Yasushi Ide	3
(Japan) Over Drive	Mazda Roadster (ND)	66	(Japan) Shigeyasu Kanamori	3
(Japan) Over Drive	Mazda Roadster (ND)	66	(Japan) Takashi Nishiyama	3
(Japan) Over Drive	Mazda Roadster (ND)	66	(Japan) Takafumi Katsuki	5
(Japan) Over Drive	Mazda Roadster (ND)	66	(Japan) Shohei Oda	6
(Japan) Over Drive	Mazda Roadster (ND)	311	(Japan) Takashi Iseya	2
(Japan) Over Drive	Mazda Roadster (ND)	311	(Japan) Sachiko Suzuki	2
(Japan) Over Drive	Mazda Roadster (ND)	311	(Japan) Koji Takeda	2, 6
(Japan) Over Drive	Mazda Roadster (ND)	311	(Japan) Ryuichiro Oyagi	6
(Japan) Over Drive	Mazda Roadster (ND)	311	(Japan) Masayoshi Oyama	6
(Japan) J’s Racing	Honda Fit 3	69	(Japan) Toshihiro Kubota	All
(Japan) J’s Racing	Honda Fit 3	69	(Japan) Shinsuke Umeda	All
(Japan) J’s Racing	Honda Fit 3	69	(Japan) Junichi Umemoto	All
(Japan) J’s Racing	Honda Fit 3	69	(Malaysia) Najiy Ayyad	3
(Japan) J’s Racing	Honda Fit 3	69	(Japan) Satoshi Naruo	3
(Japan) J’s Racing	Honda Fit 3	69	(Malaysia) Ifwat Razak	3
(Japan) J’s Racing	Honda Fit 3	70	(Japan) "MC Hirata"	2
(Japan) J’s Racing	Honda Fit 3	70	(Japan) Masaharu Imuta	1–3, 5–6
(Japan) J’s Racing	Honda Fit 3	70	(Japan) Hideo Kubota	All
(Japan) J’s Racing	Honda Fit 3	70	(Japan) Masayuki Ueda	All
(Japan) J’s Racing	Honda Fit 3	70	(Japan) Hirokazu Takahashi	2, 4
(Japan) Murakami Motors	Mazda Roadster (ND)	88	(Japan) Keiji Amamiya	2–4
(Japan) Murakami Motors	Mazda Roadster (ND)	88	(Japan) Taro Kajitani	2, 4–5
(Japan) Murakami Motors	Mazda Roadster (ND)	88	(Japan) Yoshitugu Kondo	3
(Japan) Murakami Motors	Mazda Roadster (ND)	88	(Japan) Hiroyuki Murakami	All
(Japan) Murakami Motors	Mazda Roadster (ND)	88	(Japan) Yasunori Nakajima	2–3, 5–6
(Japan) Murakami Motors	Mazda Roadster (ND)	88	(Japan) Naoki Yamaya	3–6
(Japan) Murakami Motors	Mazda Roadster (ND)	89	(Japan) Ikuo Maeda	6
(Japan) Murakami Motors	Mazda Roadster (ND)	89	(Japan) Taro Kajitani	6
(Japan) Murakami Motors	Mazda Roadster (ND)	89	(Japan) Haruhiko Sugino	6
(Japan) HM Racers	Mazda Demio	101	(Japan) Yasutaka Hinoi	3
(Japan) HM Racers	Mazda Demio	101	(Japan) Yoshinobu Koyama	3
(Japan) HM Racers	Mazda Demio	101	(Japan) "Wappaya"	3
(Japan) HM Racers	Mazda Demio	101	(Japan) "Kenbow"	1, 3–6
(Japan) HM Racers	Mazda Demio	101	(Japan) Kota Sasaki	All
(Japan) HM Racers	Mazda Demio	101	(Japan) Souichiro Yoshida	All
(Japan) RFC Racing	Honda Fit 3	168	(Japan) Shuuma Hiroshima	1–2
(Japan) RFC Racing	Honda Fit 3	168	(Japan) Kyosuke Inomata	3–5
(Japan) RFC Racing	Honda Fit 3	168	(Japan) Ryo Kobayashi	6
(Japan) RFC Racing	Honda Fit 3	168	(Japan) Tatsuya Osaki	3, 5
(Japan) RFC Racing	Honda Fit 3	168	(Japan) Shigetomo Shimono	All
(Japan) RFC Racing	Honda Fit 3	168	(Japan) Riki Tanioka	All
(Japan) Select Hotels Group Versus Racing Team	Honda Fit 3	888	(Japan) Shinichi Ebisawa	1
(Japan) Select Hotels Group Versus Racing Team	Honda Fit 3	888	(Japan) Hiroaki Nagasawa	1
(Japan) Select Hotels Group Versus Racing Team	Honda Fit 3	888	(Japan) Hiroshi Nakamura	1

== Calendar and results ==
Rnd.	Class	Circuit	Date	Pole Position	Fastest Lap	Winners
1	ST–X	Suzuka Circuit, Suzuka City	23–24 March	(Japan) #1 GTNET Motor Sports	(Japan) #1 GTNET Motor Sports	(Japan) #777 D'station Racing
1	ST–X	Suzuka Circuit, Suzuka City	23–24 March	(Japan) Teruhiko Hamano (Japan) Kazuki Hoshino (Japan) Kiyoto Fujinami	(Japan) Teruhiko Hamano (Japan) Kazuki Hoshino (Japan) Kiyoto Fujinami	(Japan) Satoshi Hoshino (Japan) Tsubasa Kondo (United Kingdom) Darren Turner
1	ST–Z	Suzuka Circuit, Suzuka City	23–24 March	#2 KTM Cars Japan	(Japan) #3 Endless Sports	(Japan) #3 Endless Sports
1	ST–Z	Suzuka Circuit, Suzuka City	23–24 March	(Japan) Taiyou Iida (Japan) Hiroki Katoh (Japan) Kazuho Takahashi	(Japan) Tsubasa Takahashi (Japan) Yudai Uchida (Japan) Hideki Yamauchi	(Japan) Tsubasa Takahashi (Japan) Yudai Uchida (Japan) Hideki Yamauchi
1	ST–TCR	Suzuka Circuit, Suzuka City	23–24 March	(Japan) #19 Birth Racing Project	(Japan) #97 Modulo Racing with Dome	(Japan) #65 Audi Team Mars
1	ST–TCR	Suzuka Circuit, Suzuka City	23–24 March		(Japan) Mitsuhiro Endō (Japan) Shinji Nakano (Japan) Hiroki Otsu (Japan) Tadao Uematsu	(Japan) Daisuke Imamura (Japan) Masanobu Kato (Japan) Hideaki Okajima (Japan) Masato Shimoyama
1	ST–1	Suzuka Circuit, Suzuka City	23–24 March	(Japan) #47 D'station Racing	(Japan) #998 Tracy Sports	(Japan) #998 Tracy Sports
1	ST–1	Suzuka Circuit, Suzuka City	23–24 March	(Japan) Kenji Hama (Japan) Tatsuya Hoshino (Japan) Manabu Orido	(China) Simon Chen (Hong Kong) Jeffrey Zee (China) Jason Zhang (China) Leo Ye	(China) Simon Chen (Hong Kong) Jeffrey Zee (China) Jason Zhang (China) Leo Ye
1	ST–2	Suzuka Circuit, Suzuka City	23–24 March	(Japan) #6 Shinryo Racing Team	(Japan) #6 Shinryo Racing Team	(Japan) #59 TOWAINTEC Racing
1	ST–2	Suzuka Circuit, Suzuka City	23–24 March	(Japan) Yasushi Kikuchi (Japan) Masazumi Ohashi (Japan) Tomohiro Tomimasu	(Japan) Yasushi Kikuchi (Japan) Masazumi Ohashi (Japan) Tomohiro Tomimasu	(Japan) Manabu Osawa (Japan) Hitoshi Goto (Japan) Takuto Iguchi (Japan) Mizuki Ishizaka
1	ST–3	Suzuka Circuit, Suzuka City	23–24 March	(Japan) #62 Le Beausset Motorsports	(Japan) #62 Le Beausset Motorsports	(Japan) #62 Le Beausset Motorsports
1	ST–3	Suzuka Circuit, Suzuka City	23–24 March	(Japan) Ryo Ogawa (Japan) Koki Saga (Japan) Kenta Yamashita	(Japan) Ryo Ogawa (Japan) Koki Saga (Japan) Kenta Yamashita	(Japan) Ryo Ogawa (Japan) Koki Saga (Japan) Kenta Yamashita
1	ST–4	Suzuka Circuit, Suzuka City	23–24 March	(Japan) #86 TOM's Spirit	(Japan) #310 C.S.I Racing	(Japan) #884 Hayashi Terenpu Shade Racing
1	ST–4	Suzuka Circuit, Suzuka City	23–24 March	(Japan) Takamitsu Matsui (Japan) Sho Tsuboi (Japan) Yuichi Nakayama	(Japan) Shinya Hosokawa (Japan) Rintaro Kubo (Japan) Rei Yamaguchi	(Japan) Hiro Hayashi (Japan) Katsuyuki Hiranaka (Japan) Yuji Kunimoto
1	ST–5	Suzuka Circuit, Suzuka City	23–24 March	(Japan) #66 Over Drive	(Japan) #69 J’s Racing	(Japan) #37 Team Nopro
1	ST–5	Suzuka Circuit, Suzuka City	23–24 March	(Japan) Riku Hashimoto (Japan) Takayuki Takechi (Japan) Katsuhiko Tsutsui	(Japan) Toshihiro Kubota (Japan) Shinsuke Umeda (Japan) Junichi Umemoto	(Japan) Kaoru Ijiri (Japan) Kazundo Tsuji (Japan) Yutaka Seki
2	ST–X	Sportsland SUGO, Murata	27–28 April	(Japan) #1 GTNET Motor Sports	(Japan) #300 Tairoku Racing	(Japan) #1 GTNET Motor Sports
2	ST–X	Sportsland SUGO, Murata	27–28 April	(Japan) Teruhiko Hamano (Japan) Kazuki Hoshino (Japan) Kiyoto Fujinami	(Brazil) Nicolas Costa (United Kingdom) Harrison Newey (Japan) Shinichi Takagi (Japan) Tairoku Yamaguchi	(Japan) Teruhiko Hamano (Japan) Kazuki Hoshino (Japan) Kiyoto Fujinami
2	ST–Z	Sportsland SUGO, Murata	27–28 April	(Japan) #3 Endless Sports	#2 KTM Cars Japan	(Japan) #3 Endless Sports
2	ST–Z	Sportsland SUGO, Murata	27–28 April	(Japan) Tsubasa Takahashi (Japan) Yudai Uchida (Japan) Hideki Yamauchi	(Japan) Taiyou Iida (Japan) Hiroki Katoh (Japan) Kazuho Takahashi	(Japan) Tsubasa Takahashi (Japan) Yudai Uchida (Japan) Hideki Yamauchi
2	ST–TCR	Sportsland SUGO, Murata	27–28 April	(Japan) #19 Birth Racing Project	(Japan) #22 Waimarama Kizuna Racing Team	(Japan) #19 Birth Racing Project
2	ST–TCR	Sportsland SUGO, Murata	27–28 April	(Japan) Takeshi Matsumoto (Japan) Yuya Oota (Japan) Takuro Shinohara	(Japan) Katsumasa Chiyo (Japan) Kazutomo Robert Hori (Japan) "Kizuna"	(Japan) Takeshi Matsumoto (Japan) Yuya Oota (Japan) Takuro Shinohara
2	ST–1	Sportsland SUGO, Murata	27–28 April	(Japan) #47 D'station Racing	(Japan) #47 D'station Racing	(Japan) #47 D'station Racing
2	ST–1	Sportsland SUGO, Murata	27–28 April	(Japan) Kenji Hama (Japan) Tatsuya Hoshino (Japan) Manabu Orido	(Japan) Kenji Hama (Japan) Tatsuya Hoshino (Japan) Manabu Orido	(Japan) Kenji Hama (Japan) Tatsuya Hoshino (Japan) Manabu Orido
2	ST–2	Sportsland SUGO, Murata	27–28 April	(Japan) #6 Shinryo Racing Team	(Japan) #59 TOWAINTEC Racing	(Japan) #6 Shinryo Racing Team
2	ST–2	Sportsland SUGO, Murata	27–28 April	(Japan) Yasushi Kikuchi (Japan) Masazumi Ohashi (Japan) Tomohiro Tomimasu	(Japan) Manabu Osawa (Japan) Hitoshi Goto (Japan) Takuto Iguchi (Japan) Mizuki Ishizaka	(Japan) Yasushi Kikuchi (Japan) Masazumi Ohashi (Japan) Tomohiro Tomimasu
2	ST–3	Sportsland SUGO, Murata	27–28 April	(Japan) #62 Le Beausset Motorsports	(Japan) #15 Okabe Jidosha Motorsport	(Japan) #38 Tracy Sports
2	ST–3	Sportsland SUGO, Murata	27–28 April	(Japan) Ryo Ogawa (Japan) Koki Saga (Japan) Kenta Yamashita	(Japan) Naohiro Furuya (Japan) Kazuomi Komatsu (Japan) Masaaki Nagashima (Japan) Jun Tashiro	(Japan) Makoto Hotta (Japan) Ryohei Sakaguchi (Japan) Yuui Tsutsumi
2	ST–4	Sportsland SUGO, Murata	27–28 April	(Japan) #86 TOM's Spirit	(Japan) #884 Hayashi Terenpu SHADE Racing	(Japan) #884 Hayashi Terenpu SHADE Racing
2	ST–4	Sportsland SUGO, Murata	27–28 April	(Japan) Takamitsu Matsui (Japan) Sho Tsuboi (Japan) Kazuya Oshima	(Japan) Hiro Hayashi (Japan) Katsuyuki Hiranaka (Japan) Yuji Kunimoto	(Japan) Hiro Hayashi (Japan) Katsuyuki Hiranaka (Japan) Yuji Kunimoto
2	ST–5	Sportsland SUGO, Murata	27–28 April	(Japan) #101 HM Racers	(Japan) #66 Over Drive	(Japan) #70 J’s Racing
2	ST–5	Sportsland SUGO, Murata	27–28 April	(Japan) Kota Sasaki (Japan) Souichiro Yoshida	(Japan) Riku Hashimoto (Japan) Takayuki Takechi (Japan) Katsuhiko Tsutsui	(Japan) Masaharu Imuta (Japan) Hideo Kubota (Japan) Masayuki Ueda
3	ST–X	Fuji Speedway, Oyama	31 May–2 June	(Japan) #300 Tairoku Racing	(Japan) #1 GTNET Motor Sports	(Japan) #1 GTNET Motor Sports
3	ST–X	Fuji Speedway, Oyama	31 May–2 June	(Brazil) Nicolas Costa (United Kingdom) Harrison Newey (Japan) Shinichi Takagi (Japan) Tairoku Yamaguchi (Japan) Satoshi Motoyama	(Japan) Teruhiko Hamano (Japan) Kazuki Hoshino (Japan) Kiyoto Fujinami (Japan) Kazuki Hiramine	(Japan) Teruhiko Hamano (Japan) Kazuki Hoshino (Japan) Kiyoto Fujinami (Japan) Kazuki Hiramine
3	ST–Z	Fuji Speedway, Oyama	31 May–2 June	#2 KTM Cars Japan	(Japan) #3 Endless Sports	(Japan) #3 Endless Sports
3	ST–Z	Fuji Speedway, Oyama	31 May–2 June	(Japan) Taiyou Iida (Japan) Hiroki Katoh (Japan) Kazuho Takahashi (Japan) Takashi Kobayashi (Japan) Hiroshi Hamaguchi	(Japan) Tsubasa Takahashi (Japan) Yudai Uchida (Japan) Hideki Yamauchi (Japan) Shinnosuke Yamada	(Japan) Tsubasa Takahashi (Japan) Yudai Uchida (Japan) Hideki Yamauchi (Japan) Shinnosuke Yamada
3	ST–TCR	Fuji Speedway, Oyama	31 May–2 June	(Japan) #97 Modulo Racing with Dome	(Japan) #45 Team DreamDrive	(Japan) #97 Modulo Racing with Dome
3	ST–TCR	Fuji Speedway, Oyama	31 May–2 June	(Japan) Mitsuhiro Endō (Japan) Shinji Nakano (Japan) Hiroki Otsu (Japan) Tadao Uematsu (Japan) Tomoki Nojiri	(Japan) Naoto Takeda (Japan) Takuya Shirasaka (Japan) Shozo Tagahara (Japan) Yoshiyuki Okumura	(Japan) Mitsuhiro Endō (Japan) Shinji Nakano (Japan) Hiroki Otsu (Japan) Tadao Uematsu (Japan) Tomoki Nojiri
3	ST–1	Fuji Speedway, Oyama	31 May–2 June	(Japan) #47 D'station Racing	(Japan) #47 D'station Racing	(Japan) #47 D'station Racing
3	ST–1	Fuji Speedway, Oyama	31 May–2 June	(Japan) Kenji Hama (Japan) Tatsuya Hoshino (Japan) Manabu Orido (Japan) Kenji Kobayashi (Japan) Tsubasa Kondo	(Japan) Kenji Hama (Japan) Tatsuya Hoshino (Japan) Manabu Orido (Japan) Kenji Kobayashi (Japan) Tsubasa Kondo	(Japan) Kenji Hama (Japan) Tatsuya Hoshino (Japan) Manabu Orido (Japan) Kenji Kobayashi (Japan) Tsubasa Kondo
3	ST–2	Fuji Speedway, Oyama	31 May–2 June	(Japan) #59 TOWAINTEC Racing	(Japan) #59 TOWAINTEC Racing	(Japan) #59 TOWAINTEC Racing
3	ST–2	Fuji Speedway, Oyama	31 May–2 June	(Japan) Manabu Osawa (Japan) Hitoshi Goto (Japan) Takuto Iguchi (Japan) Mizuki Ishizaka	(Japan) Manabu Osawa (Japan) Hitoshi Goto (Japan) Takuto Iguchi (Japan) Mizuki Ishizaka	(Japan) Manabu Osawa (Japan) Hitoshi Goto (Japan) Takuto Iguchi (Japan) Mizuki Ishizaka
3	ST–3	Fuji Speedway, Oyama	31 May–2 June	(Japan) #68 Saitama Toyopet GreenBrave	(Japan) #14 Okabe Jidosha Motorsport	(Japan) #34 Techno First
3	ST–3	Fuji Speedway, Oyama	31 May–2 June	(Japan) Taku Bamba (Japan) Takayuki Hiranuma (Japan) Naoki Hattori (Japan) Shigekazu Wakisaka (Japan) Hiroki Yoshida	(Japan) Isao Ihashi (Japan) Ataka Mitsunori (Japan) Manabu Yamazaki (Japan) Yuuga Katsumata (Japan) Toshiaki Koshimizu (Japan) Isamu Tabata	(Japan) Shuji Maejima (Japan) Riki Okusa (Japan) Yuya Tezuka (Japan) Takao Onishi
3	ST–4	Fuji Speedway, Oyama	31 May–2 June	(Japan) #86 TOM's Spirit	(Japan) #13 Endless Sports	(Japan) #86 TOM's Spirit
3	ST–4	Fuji Speedway, Oyama	31 May–2 June	(Japan) Takamitsu Matsui (Japan) Sho Tsuboi (Japan) Yuichi Nakayama (Japan) Kimiya Sato	(Japan) Naoya Gamou (Japan) Ritomo Miyata (Japan) Yuki Nakayama (Japan) Togo Suganami	(Japan) Takamitsu Matsui (Japan) Sho Tsuboi (Japan) Yuichi Nakayama (Japan) Kimiya Sato
3	ST–5	Fuji Speedway, Oyama	31 May–2 June	(Japan) #101 HM Racers	(Japan) #70 J’s Racing	(Japan) #88 Murakami Motors
3	ST–5	Fuji Speedway, Oyama	31 May–2 June	(Japan) Yasutaka Hinoi (Japan) Yoshinobu Koyama (Japan) "Wappaya" (Japan) "Kenbow" (Japan) Kota Sasaki (Japan) Souichiro Yoshida	(Japan) Masaharu Imuta (Japan) Hideo Kubota (Japan) Masayuki Ueda	(Japan) Keiji Amamiya (Japan) Yoshitugu Kondo (Japan) Hiroyuki Murakami (Japan) Yasunori Nakajima (Japan) Naoki Yamaya
4	ST–X	Autopolis, Kamitsue	20–21 July	(Japan) #244 MAX Racing	(Japan) #777 D'station Racing	(Japan) #1 GTNET Motor Sports
4	ST–X	Autopolis, Kamitsue	20–21 July	(Japan) Kimiya Sato (Japan) Tetsuya Tanaka (Japan) Toru Tanaka	(Japan) Tomonobu Fujii (Japan) Satoshi Hoshino (Japan) Tsubasa Kondo	(Japan) Teruhiko Hamano (Japan) Kazuki Hoshino (Japan) Kiyoto Fujinami
4	ST–Z	Autopolis, Kamitsue	20–21 July	(Japan) #3 Endless Sports	(Japan) #3 Endless Sports	(Japan) #190 Birth Racing Project
4	ST–Z	Autopolis, Kamitsue	20–21 July	(Japan) Tsubasa Takahashi (Japan) Yudai Uchida (Japan) Hideki Yamauchi	(Japan) Tsubasa Takahashi (Japan) Yudai Uchida (Japan) Hideki Yamauchi	(Japan) Akira Mizutani (Japan) Koichi Okumura (Japan) Daisuke Yamawaki
4	ST–TCR	Autopolis, Kamitsue	20–21 July	(Japan) #75 Team Noah	(Japan) #10 Adenau	(Japan) #97 Modulo Racing with Dome
4	ST–TCR	Autopolis, Kamitsue	20–21 July	(Japan) Yuji Kiyotaki (Japan) Yoshikazu Sobu (Japan) Toshiro Tsukada	(France) Philippe Devesa (Japan) Shogo Mitsuyama (Australia) Jake Parsons	(Japan) Mitsuhiro Endō (Japan) Shinji Nakano (Japan) Hiroki Otsu (Japan) Tadao Uematsu
4	ST–1	Autopolis, Kamitsue	20–21 July	(Japan) #47 D'station Racing	(Japan) #998 Tracy Sports	(Japan) #998 Tracy Sports
4	ST–1	Autopolis, Kamitsue	20–21 July	(Japan) Kenji Hama (Japan) Tatsuya Hoshino (Japan) Manabu Orido	(China) Simon Chen (Hong Kong) Jeffrey Zee (China) Jason Zhang (China) Leo Ye	(China) Simon Chen (Hong Kong) Jeffrey Zee (China) Jason Zhang (China) Leo Ye
4	ST–2	Autopolis, Kamitsue	20–21 July	(Japan) #59 TOWAINTEC Racing	(Japan) #59 TOWAINTEC Racing	(Japan) #7 Shinryo Racing Team
4	ST–2	Autopolis, Kamitsue	20–21 July	(Japan) Manabu Osawa (Japan) Hitoshi Goto (Japan) Takuto Iguchi (Japan) Mizuki Ishizaka	(Japan) Manabu Osawa (Japan) Hitoshi Goto (Japan) Takuto Iguchi (Japan) Mizuki Ishizaka	(Japan) Koji Endo (Japan) Masato Narisawa (Japan) Zene Okazaki (Japan) Asahi Turbo
4	ST–3	Autopolis, Kamitsue	20–21 July	(Japan) #14 Okabe Jidosha Motorsport	(Japan) #14 Okabe Jidosha Motorsport	(Japan) #34 Techno First
4	ST–3	Autopolis, Kamitsue	20–21 July	(Japan) Isao Ihashi (Japan) Ataka Mitsunori (Japan) Manabu Yamazaki	(Japan) Isao Ihashi (Japan) Ataka Mitsunori (Japan) Manabu Yamazaki	(Japan) Shuji Maejima (Japan) Riki Okusa (Japan) Yuya Tezuka
4	ST–4	Autopolis, Kamitsue	20–21 July	(Japan) #86 TOM's Spirit	(Japan) #86 TOM's Spirit	(Japan) #86 TOM's Spirit
4	ST–4	Autopolis, Kamitsue	20–21 July	(Japan) Takamitsu Matsui (Japan) Sho Tsuboi (Japan) Yuichi Nakayama	(Japan) Takamitsu Matsui (Japan) Sho Tsuboi (Japan) Yuichi Nakayama	(Japan) Takamitsu Matsui (Japan) Sho Tsuboi (Japan) Yuichi Nakayama
4	ST–5	Autopolis, Kamitsue	20–21 July	(Japan) #88 Murakami Motors	(Japan) #4 Team Bride	(Japan) #101 HM Racers
4	ST–5	Autopolis, Kamitsue	20–21 July	(Japan) Keiji Amamiya (Japan) Taro Kajitani (Japan) Hiroyuki Murakami (Japan) Naoki Yamaya	(Japan) Karuros Honda (Japan) Hidefumi Minami (Japan) Shunsuke Sato (Japan) Tomomitsu Senoo	(Japan) "Kenbow" (Japan) Kota Sasaki (Japan) Souichiro Yoshida
5	ST–X	Twin Ring Motegi, Motegi	14–15 September	(Japan) #777 D'station Racing	(Japan) #777 D'station Racing	(Hong Kong) #83 X Works
5	ST–X	Twin Ring Motegi, Motegi	14–15 September	(Japan) Tomonobu Fujii (Japan) Satoshi Hoshino (Japan) Tsubasa Kondo	(Japan) Tomonobu Fujii (Japan) Satoshi Hoshino (Japan) Tsubasa Kondo	(Hong Kong) Philip Tang (Hong Kong) Shaun Thong (Hong Kong) Smart Tse Ka Hing
5	ST–Z	Twin Ring Motegi, Motegi	14–15 September	#2 KTM Cars Japan	#2 KTM Cars Japan	#2 KTM Cars Japan
5	ST–Z	Twin Ring Motegi, Motegi	14–15 September	(Japan) Taiyo Ida (Japan) Hiroki Katoh (Japan) Kazuho Takahashi	(Japan) Taiyo Ida (Japan) Hiroki Katoh (Japan) Kazuho Takahashi	(Japan) Taiyo Ida (Japan) Hiroki Katoh (Japan) Kazuho Takahashi
5	ST–TCR	Twin Ring Motegi, Motegi	14–15 September	(Japan) #65 Audi Team Mars	(Japan) #65 Audi Team Mars	(Japan) #97 Modulo Racing with Dome
5	ST–TCR	Twin Ring Motegi, Motegi	14–15 September	(Japan) Daisuke Imamura (Japan) Masanobu Kato (Japan) Masato Shimoyama (Japan) Taketoshi Matsui	(Japan) Daisuke Imamura (Japan) Masanobu Kato (Japan) Masato Shimoyama (Japan) Taketoshi Matsui	(Japan) Mitsuhiro Endō (Japan) Shinji Nakano (Japan) Hiroki Otsu (Japan) Tadao Uematsu
5	ST–1	Twin Ring Motegi, Motegi	14–15 September	(Japan) #47 D'station Racing	(Japan) #998 Tracy Sports	(Japan) #47 D'station Racing
5	ST–1	Twin Ring Motegi, Motegi	14–15 September	(Japan) Kenji Hama (Japan) Tatsuya Hoshino (Japan) Manabu Orido	(China) Simon Chen (Hong Kong) Jeffrey Zee (China) Jason Zhang (China) Leo Ye	(Japan) Kenji Hama (Japan) Tatsuya Hoshino (Japan) Manabu Orido
5	ST–2	Twin Ring Motegi, Motegi	14–15 September	(Japan) #59 TOWAINTEC Racing	(Japan) #6 Shinryo Racing Team	(Japan) #6 Shinryo Racing Team
5	ST–2	Twin Ring Motegi, Motegi	14–15 September	(Japan) Manabu Osawa (Japan) Hitoshi Goto (Japan) Takuto Iguchi (Japan) Mizuki Ishizaka	(Japan) Yasushi Kikuchi (Japan) Masazumi Ohashi (Japan) Tomohiro Tomimasu	(Japan) Yasushi Kikuchi (Japan) Masazumi Ohashi (Japan) Tomohiro Tomimasu
5	ST–3	Twin Ring Motegi, Motegi	14–15 September	(Japan) #68 Saitama Toyopet GreenBrave	(Japan) #68 Saitama Toyopet GreenBrave	(Japan) #62 Le Beausset Motorsports
5	ST–3	Twin Ring Motegi, Motegi	14–15 September	(Japan) Naoki Hattori (Japan) Shigekazu Wakisaka (Japan) Hiroki Yoshida	(Japan) Naoki Hattori (Japan) Shigekazu Wakisaka (Japan) Hiroki Yoshida	(Japan) Ryo Ogawa (Japan) Koki Saga (Japan) Kenta Yamashita
5	ST–4	Twin Ring Motegi, Motegi	14–15 September	(Japan) #310 C.S.I Racing	(Japan) #104 Rookie Racing	(Japan) #86 TOM's Spirit
5	ST–4	Twin Ring Motegi, Motegi	14–15 September	(Japan) Shinya Hosokawa (Japan) Rintaro Kubo (Japan) Hirokazu Suzuki	(Japan) Yasuhiro Ogura (Japan) Daisuke Toyoda (Japan) Masahiro Sasaki	(Japan) Takamitsu Matsui (Japan) Sho Tsuboi (Japan) Yuichi Nakayama
5	ST–5	Twin Ring Motegi, Motegi	14–15 September	(Japan) #4 Team Bride	(Japan) #4 Team Bride	(Japan) #4 Team Bride
5	ST–5	Twin Ring Motegi, Motegi	14–15 September	(Japan) Hidefumi Minami (Japan) Shunsuke Sato	(Japan) Hidefumi Minami (Japan) Shunsuke Sato	(Japan) Hidefumi Minami (Japan) Shunsuke Sato
6	ST–X	Okayama International Circuit, Mimasaka	9–10 November	(Japan) #777 D'station Racing	(Japan) #777 D'station Racing	(Japan) #777 D'station Racing
6	ST–X	Okayama International Circuit, Mimasaka	9–10 November	(Japan) Tomonobu Fujii (Japan) Satoshi Hoshino (Japan) Tsubasa Kondo	(Japan) Tomonobu Fujii (Japan) Satoshi Hoshino (Japan) Tsubasa Kondo	(Japan) Tomonobu Fujii (Japan) Satoshi Hoshino (Japan) Tsubasa Kondo
6	ST–Z	Okayama International Circuit, Mimasaka	9–10 November	#2 KTM Cars Japan	(Japan) #3 Endless Sports	#2 KTM Cars Japan
6	ST–Z	Okayama International Circuit, Mimasaka	9–10 November	(Japan) Taiyou Iida (Japan) Hiroki Katoh (Japan) Kazuho Takahashi	(Japan) Tsubasa Takahashi (Japan) Yudai Uchida (Japan) Hideki Yamauchi	(Japan) Taiyou Iida (Japan) Hiroki Katoh (Japan) Kazuho Takahashi
6	ST–TCR	Okayama International Circuit, Mimasaka	9–10 November	(Japan) #19 Birth Racing Project	(Japan) #97 Modulo Racing with Dome	(Japan) #19 Birth Racing Project
6	ST–TCR	Okayama International Circuit, Mimasaka	9–10 November	(Japan) Takeshi Matsumoto (Japan) Yuya Oota (Japan) Takuro Shinohara	(Japan) Mitsuhiro Endō (Japan) Shinji Nakano (Japan) Hiroki Otsu (Japan) Tadao Uematsu	(Japan) Takeshi Matsumoto (Japan) Yuya Oota (Japan) Takuro Shinohara
6	ST–1	Okayama International Circuit, Mimasaka	9–10 November	(Japan) #47 D'station Racing	(Japan) #47 D'station Racing	(Japan) #47 D'station Racing
6	ST–1	Okayama International Circuit, Mimasaka	9–10 November	(Japan) Kenji Hama (Japan) Tatsuya Hoshino (Japan) Manabu Orido	(Japan) Kenji Hama (Japan) Tatsuya Hoshino (Japan) Manabu Orido	(Japan) Kenji Hama (Japan) Tatsuya Hoshino (Japan) Manabu Orido
6	ST–2	Okayama International Circuit, Mimasaka	9–10 November	(Japan) #59 TOWAINTEC Racing	(Japan) #59 TOWAINTEC Racing	(Japan) #7 Shinryo Racing Team
6	ST–2	Okayama International Circuit, Mimasaka	9–10 November	(Japan) Manabu Osawa (Japan) Hitoshi Goto (Japan) Takuto Iguchi (Japan) Mizuki Ishizaka	(Japan) Manabu Osawa (Japan) Hitoshi Goto (Japan) Takuto Iguchi (Japan) Mizuki Ishizaka	(Japan) Koji Endo (Japan) Masato Narisawa (Japan) Zene Okazaki (Japan) Asahi Turbo
6	ST–3	Okayama International Circuit, Mimasaka	9–10 November	(Japan) #68 Saitama Toyopet GreenBrave	(Japan) #15 Okabe Jidosha Motorsport	(Japan) #38 Tracy Sports
6	ST–3	Okayama International Circuit, Mimasaka	9–10 November	(Japan) Naoki Hattori (Japan) Shigekazu Wakisaka (Japan) Hiroki Yoshida	(Japan) Naohiro Furuya (Japan) Kazuomi Komatsu (Japan) Masaaki Nagashima (Japan) Masaya Kouno	(Japan) Makoto Hotta (Japan) Ryohei Sakaguchi (Japan) Yuui Tsutsumi
6	ST–4	Okayama International Circuit, Mimasaka	9–10 November	(Japan) #884 Hayashi Terenpu SHADE Racing	(Japan) #13 Endless Sports	(Japan) #86 TOM's Spirit
6	ST–4	Okayama International Circuit, Mimasaka	9–10 November	(Japan) Hiro Hayashi (Japan) Katsuyuki Hiranaka (Japan) Yuji Kunimoto (Japan) Keishi Ishikawa	(Japan) Naoya Gamou (Japan) Ritomo Miyata (Japan) Yuki Nakayama	(Japan) Takamitsu Matsui (Japan) Sho Tsuboi (Japan) Yuichi Nakayama
6	ST–5	Okayama International Circuit, Mimasaka	9–10 November	(Japan) #66 Over Drive	(Japan) #66 Over Drive	(Japan) #66 Over Drive
6	ST–5	Okayama International Circuit, Mimasaka	9–10 November	(Japan) Riku Hashimoto (Japan) Takayuki Takechi (Japan) Shohei Oda	(Japan) Riku Hashimoto (Japan) Takayuki Takechi (Japan) Shohei Oda	(Japan) Riku Hashimoto (Japan) Takayuki Takechi (Japan) Shohei Oda

== Championship standings ==
Pos.	Driver	SUZ	SUG	FUJ	AUT	MOT	OKA	Pts.
ST–X
1	(Japan) No. 1 GTNET Motor Sports	**6**	**1**	1	1		3	130
2	(Japan) No. 777 D'station Racing	1	3		2	**3**	**1**	109.5
3	(Japan) No. 9 MP Racing	3	Ret	2	6	2	5	101
4	(Japan) No. 244 MAX Racing	2	2		**4**	Ret	4	67.5
5	(Japan) No. 112 Sato-SS Sports	5			3		2	65
6	(Hong Kong) No. 83 X Works	4	Ret	Ret	5	1		60
7	(Japan) No. 300 Tairoku Racing	Ret	4	**3**				40
ST–Z
1	(Japan) No. 3 Endless Sports	1	**1**	1	**2**	2	3	160
2	No. 2 KTM Cars Japan	**2**	2	**Ret**	WD	**1**	**1**	95.5
3	(Japan) No. 190 Birth Racing Project	3	Ret		1	3	5	78
4	(Japan) No. 51 BEND			2				36
5	(Japan) No. 35 Techno First	WD	WD		DNS		2	16
6	(Japan) No. 500 Team 5ZIGEN						4	11
ST–TCR
1	(Japan) No. 19 Birth Racing Project	**2**	**1**	6	Ret	4	**1**	98.5
2	(Japan) No. 97 Modulo Racing with Dome	4	Ret	**Ret**	1	1	5	88
3	(Japan) No. 45 Team DreamDrive	5	2	1	DSQ	9	6	86
4	(Japan) No. 10 Adenau	10	Ret	2	2	5	7	84.5
5	(Japan) No. 22 Waimarama Kizuna Racing Team		6	5	4	2	3	78.5
6	(Japan) No. 65 Audi Team Mars	1	5	4	Ret	**8**	Ret	70.5
7	(Japan) No. 75 Team Noah	6	3	8	**5**	7	4	63
8	(Japan) No. 108 RFC Racing	Ret	4	3	3	Ret	Ret	58
9	(Hong Kong) No. 501 KCMG	3	Ret	7	DNS	6	2	55
10	No. 33 Audi driving experience Japan					3		19
ST–1
1	(Japan) No. 47 D'station Racing	**2**	**1**	**1**	**2**	1	**1**	172
2	(Japan) No. 998 Tracy Sports	1	DNS	WD	1	**2**	2	101.5
ST–2
1	(Japan) No. 59 TOWAINTEC Racing	**1**	**Ret**	**1**	**2**	**2**	**2**	144
2	(Japan) No. 6 Shinryo Racing Team	2	1	3	Ret	1	4	116.5
3	(Japan) No. 17 Team Nopro	3	2	4	3	3	5	106
4	(Japan) No. 7 Shinryo Racing Team	4	Ret	2	1	Ret	1	104
5	(Japan) No. 743 Honda R&D Challenge					4	WD	16
6	(Japan) No. 63 ATJ Racing-ST						3	13
ST–3
1	(Japan) No. 34 Techno First	7	4	1	1	4	4	122
2	(Japan) No. 68 Saitama Toyopet GreenBrave	3	2	**4**	2	**2**	**3**	122
3	(Japan) No. 38 Tracy Sports	2	1	3		3	1	112.5
4	(Japan) No. 62 Le Beausset Motorsports	**1**	6	Ret	3	1	Ret	92
5	(Japan) No. 39 Tracy Sports	5	5	2	4	6	5	91
6	(Japan) No. 14 Okabe Jidosha Motorsport	4	3	6	**5**	7	Ret	64
7	(Japan) No. 15 Okabe Jidosha Motorsport	6	**7**	5	Ret	5	2	63
8	(Japan) No. 41 Tracy Sports				6			10
ST–4
1	(Japan) No. 884 Hayashi Terenpu SHADE Racing	1	1	3	2	3	**2**	139.5
2	(Japan) No. 86 TOM's Spirit	**Ret**	**7**	**1**	**1**	**2**	3	123.5
3	(Japan) No. 310 C.S.I Racing	2	2	8	11	1	4	90.5
4	(Japan) No. 13 Endless Sports		3	2	3	Ret	1	89
5	(Spain) No. 5 Tracy Sports SPV Racing	Ret	4	4	5	6	6	65
6	(Japan) No. 104 Rookie Racing	Ret	9	5	6	4	Ret	48
7	(Japan) No. 116 Kyaputen Harokku Racing Team	3	5	6	8	Ret	Ret	47.5
8	(Japan) No. 28 T's Concept	4	DNS	7	10	5	7	46.5
9	(Japan) No. 8 APROS Racing	5	6	10	7	8	Ret	38
10	(Japan) No. 18 Asano Racing Service	Ret	8	9	4	8	Ret	31.5
11	(Japan) No. 333 Glory Racing with A-One						5	9
12	(Japan) No. 54 TC Corse	DNS	Ret		9	9	Ret	8
ST–5
1	(Japan) No. 4 Team Bride	5	4	4	3	**1**	4	110
2	(Japan) No. 88 Murakami Motors	Ret	Ret	1	**5**	4	2	93
3	(Japan) No. 168 RFC Racing	7	5	3	6	5	3	80
4	(Japan) No. 66 Over Drive	**4**	6	Ret	2	7	**1**	76.5
5	(Japan) No. 69 J's Racing	3	3	2	Ret	8	9	76.5
6	(Japan) No. 101 HM Racers	6	**2**	**Ret**	1	6	7	73
7	(Japan) No. 70 J's Racing	2	1	5	8	10	Ret	71.5
8	(Japan) No. 37 Team Nopro	1	WD	7	WD	2	8	68.5
9	(Japan) No. 78 Love Drive Racing	Ret	7	Ret	4	3	5	49
10	(Japan) No. 50 Love Drive Racing	Ret	8	6	7	9	13	30
11	(Japan) No. 11 Blood Sports						6	7
12	(Japan) No. 311 Over Drive		9				10	5
13	(Japan) No. 89 Murakami Motors						11	1
14	(Japan) No. 103 Blood Sports						12	1
15	(Japan) No. 888 Select Hotels Group Versus Racing Team	Ret						0
Pos.	Driver	SUZ	SUG	FUJ	AUT	MOT	OKA	Pts.

Colour	Result
Gold	Winner
Silver	Second place
Bronze	Third place
Green	Points classification
Blue	Non-points classification
Blue	Non-classified finish (NC)
Purple	Retired, not classified (Ret)
Red	Did not qualify (DNQ)
Red	Did not pre-qualify (DNPQ)
Black	Disqualified (DSQ)
White	Did not start (DNS)
White	Withdrew (WD)
White	Race cancelled (C)
Blank	Did not practice (DNP)
Blank	Did not arrive (DNA)
Blank	Excluded (EX)

**Bold** – Pole
Italics – Fastest Lap

Notes:

- † – Drivers did not finish the race, but were classified as they completed over 75% of the race distance.
