= Shinya Michimi =

Japanese racing driver (born 1993)

- 道見ショーン真也
- Born: Shinya Sean Michimi; 29 June 1993 (age 33); Cincinnati, Ohio, U.S.
- Nationality: (Japan) Japanese
- Categorisation: FIA Silver

Championship titles
- 2016: Lamborghini Super Trofeo North America – Pro

Shinya Sean Michimi (道見ショーン真也, Michimi Shōn Shinya; born 29 June 1993) is an American-born Japanese former racing driver who last competed in the GTD class of the IMSA SportsCar Championship for Meyer Shank Racing with Curb-Agajanian.

== Career ==
Born in Cincinnati to a Japanese father and American mother, Michimi lived in the US throughout his karting career, before moving to Japan to make his single-seater debut in 2012 in Formula Challenge Japan. In his first season in the series as a Toyota development driver, Michimi scored his only points of the season at Suzuka by finishing fourth and taking three points.

Returning to Formula Challenge Japan under Toyota's support for 2013, Michimi took his maiden series podium at Motegi by finishing second from pole. Michimi then scored two more podiums in the subsequent two rounds at Fuji, which helped him end the year seventh in points. At the end of the year, Michimi competed in the MRF Racing-centrally run 2013–14 MRF Challenge Formula 2000 Championship. Racing in the first three rounds of the season, Michimi took his only podium of the season on his final series appearance, finishing second to Rupert Svendsen-Cook in race four at Bahrain.

After testing Auto GP machinery in late 2013 for Euronova Racing, Michimi joined the team for the fourth round of the 2014 season at Monza to make his series debut. Running as high as fourth on debut, Michimi retired due to a mechanical failure in race one, before finishing sixth in race two. After another one-off appearance at the Red Bull Ring in which he finished fourth in race two, Michimi returned to the team for the season-finale at Estoril, taking his maiden win in cars in race two.

Michimi remained with Vincenzo Sospiri Racing as he switched to Lamborghini Super Trofeo Europe for 2015. Racing alongside Kei Cozzolino, the pair won in the Pro-Am class at Monza, before moving up to the Pro class and taking a best result of second at Spa. Remaining in Super Trofeo competition for 2016, Michimi joined Prestige Performance to race in its North American counterpart in the Pro class as a Lamborghini junior. Taking his maiden series win at Laguna Seca, before winning both races at Watkins Glen and VIR, and then taking winning Road America, helping him to secure the Super Trofeo North America title at season's end. After taking a one-year hiatus, Michimi returned to Super Trofeo North America for 2018, joining Precision Performance Motorsports in the Pro class alongside Brandon Gdovic. In his return to racing, Michimi took a lone win at Road America en route to a fourth-place points finish in class.

In 2019, Michimi joined X Works to race with them in Super Taikyu and part-time in the GT300 class of the Super GT Series, in which he scored a best result of sixth at Sugo. During 2019, Michimi missed the second-to-last round of the Super Taikyu series as he made a one-off comeback to Lamborghini Super Trofeo North America at VIR, in which he won race two. Towards the end of the year, Michimi competed in the Petit Le Mans for Precision Performance Motorsports in the GTD class, in which he qualified third in class and set the fastest lap in GTD.

The following year, Michimi joined Honda-affiliated Meyer Shank Racing to contest the endurance rounds of the IMSA SportsCar Championship. In the four races he contested, Michimi won at Road Atlanta, finished third at Sebring and scored the GTD pole for the Petit Le Mans. After sitting most of 2021 on the sidelines, Michimi made a one-off appearance in the ST-X class of the Super Taikyu Series as he raced in the Fuji 24 Hours for CarGuy Racing.

== Karting record ==
=== Karting career summary ===
| Season | Series | Team | Position |
|---|---|---|---|
| 2005 | WKA Manufacturer's Cup – HPV Junior Sportsman | | 22nd |
| 2005 | WKA Manufacturer's Cup – Yamaha Junior | | 30th |
| 2006 | WKA Manufacturer's Cup – Yamaha Junior | | 10th |
| 2007 | WKA Manufacturer's Cup – HPV Junior Heavy | | 7th |
| 2007 | 200 Miles of Newcastle | L&T Racing | 62nd |
| 2008 | Manufacturer's Cup Series – Yamaha Jr SuperCan Heavy | | 2nd |
| 2008 | Manufacturer's Cup Series – Yamaha Jr SuperCan Lite | Merlin Woltjer USA | 13th |
| 2008 | Rotax Max Challenge USA – Junior Max | Merlin MRP USA | 25th |
| 2008 | 200 Miles of Newcastle | Team KartLift | 35th |
| 2009 | WKA Manufacturer's Cup – HPV Junior Lite | | 5th |
| 2010 | 200 Miles of Newcastle | RaceToADomain.com | 34th |
| 2011 | WKA Manufacturer's Cup – Komet Lite | | 2nd |
| 2012 | 200 Miles of Newcastle | Three Samurais | 41st |

== Racing record ==
=== Racing career summary ===
| Season | Series | Team | Races | Wins | Poles | F/Laps | Podiums | Points | Position |
|---|---|---|---|---|---|---|---|---|---|
| 2012 | Formula Challenge Japan | FTRS Scholarship | 12 | 0 | 0 | 0 | 0 | 3 | 10th |
| 2012–13 | MRF Challenge Formula 2000 Championship | MRF Racing | 4 | 0 | 0 | 0 | 0 | 24 | 12th |
| 2013 | Formula Challenge Japan | FTRS Scholarship SMR | 12 | 0 | 2 | 0 | 3 | 26 | 7th |
| 2013–14 | MRF Challenge Formula 2000 Championship | MRF Racing | 8 | 0 | 0 | 0 | 1 | 62 | 6th |
| 2014 | Auto GP Series | Euronova Racing | 6 | 1 | 0 | 3 | 1 | 55 | 8th |
| 2015 | Lamborghini Super Trofeo Europe – Pro-Am | Vincenzo Sospiri Racing | 4 | 1 | 0 | 1 | 1 | 0 | NC |
| 2015 | Lamborghini Super Trofeo Europe – Pro | Vincenzo Sospiri Racing | 10 | 0 | 0 | 0 | 2 | 81 | 5th |
| 2016 | Lamborghini Super Trofeo North America – Pro | Prestige Performance | 12 | 6 | 6 | 8 | 12 | 110 | **1st** |
| 2016 | Lamborghini Super Trofeo World Final – Pro | Prestige Performance | 2 | 0 | 0 | 0 | 0 | 9 | 7th |
| 2016 | Lamborghini Super Trofeo Europe – Pro-Am | Vincenzo Sospiri Racing | 2 | 0 | 0 | 0 | 0 | 2 | 20th |
| 2018 | Lamborghini Super Trofeo North America – Pro | Precision Performance Motorsports | 10 | 1 | 3 | 0 | 8 | 110 | 4th |
| 2018 | California 8 Hours – GT3 Pro-Am | Precision Performance Motorsports | 1 | 0 | 0 | 0 | 1 | —N/a | **2nd** |
| 2019 | Super GT – GT300 | X Works | 5 | 0 | 0 | 0 | 0 | 12 | 23rd |
| 2019 | Super Taikyu – ST-X | X Works | 4 | 0 | 0 | 0 | 0 | 60‡ | 6th‡ |
| 2019 | Lamborghini Super Trofeo North America – Pro | Precision Performance Motorsports | 2 | 1 | 1 | 0 | 2 | 26 | 7th |
| 2019 | IMSA SportsCar Championship – GTD | Precision Performance Motorsports | 1 | 0 | 0 | 1 | 0 | 21 | 55th |
| 2020 | IMSA SportsCar Championship – GTD | Meyer Shank Racing with Curb-Agajanian | 4 | 1 | 1 | 0 | 2 | 107 | 26th |
| 2021 | Super Taikyu – ST-X | CarGuy Racing | 1 | 0 | 0 | 0 | 0 | 23‡ | 7th‡ |

^{‡} Team standings

=== Complete Formula Challenge Japan results ===
(key) (Races in bold indicate pole position) (Races in italics indicate fastest lap)

| Year | Team | 1 | 2 | 3 | 4 | 5 | 6 | 7 | 8 | 9 | 10 | 11 | 12 | DC | Pts |
|---|---|---|---|---|---|---|---|---|---|---|---|---|---|---|---|
| 2012 | FTRS Scholarship | FUJ1; 1; 12 | FUJ1; 2; 9 | MOT; 1; 10 | MOT; 2 Ret | FUJ2; 1; 9 | FUJ2; 2; 9 | FUJ2; 3; 11 | SUZ1; 1; 8 | SUZ1; 2; 4 | SUZ2; 1; 9 | SUZ2; 2; 8 | SUZ2; 3; 9 | 10th | 3 |
| 2013 | FTRS Scholarship SMR | FUJ1; 1; 9 | FUJ1; 2; 5 | MOT; 1; 4 | **MOT**; **2**; 2 | FUJ2; 1; 3 | FUJ2; 2; 13 | FUJ2; 3; 11 | FUJ3; 1; 2 | **FUJ3**; **2**; 13 | SUZ; 1; 9 | SUZ; 2; 7 | SUZ; 3; 12 | 7th | 26 |

=== Complete Auto GP results ===
(key) (Races in bold indicate pole position) (Races in italics indicate fastest lap)

| Year | Entrant | 1 | 2 | 3 | 4 | 5 | 6 | 7 | 8 | 9 | 10 | 11 | 12 | 13 | 14 | 15 | 16 | Pos | Points |
|---|---|---|---|---|---|---|---|---|---|---|---|---|---|---|---|---|---|---|---|
| 2014 | Euronova Racing | MAR; 1 | MAR; 2 | LEC; 1 | LEC; 2 | HUN; 1 | HUN; 2 | MNZ; 1; 11† | MNZ; 2; 6 | IMO; 1 | IMO; 2 | RBR; 1; 6 | RBR; 2; 4 | NÜR; 1 | NÜR; 2 | EST; 1; 6 | EST; 2; 1 | 8th | 55 |

=== Complete Super GT Series results ===
| Year | Team | Car | Class | 1 | 2 | 3 | 4 | 5 | 6 | 7 | 8 | Rank | Points |
|---|---|---|---|---|---|---|---|---|---|---|---|---|---|
| 2019 | X Works | Nismo GT-R GT3 | GT300 | OKA | FUJ; 7 | SUZ | CHA | FUJ; 16 | AUT; 19 | SUG; 6 | MOT; 8 | 23rd | 12 |

=== Complete IMSA WeatherTech Sportscar Championship results ===
| Year | Team | Class | Make | Engine | 1 | 2 | 3 | 4 | 5 | 6 | 7 | 8 | 9 | 10 | 11 | Rank | Points | Ref |
|---|---|---|---|---|---|---|---|---|---|---|---|---|---|---|---|---|---|---|
| 2019 | Precision Performance Motorsports | GTD | Lamborghini Huracán GT3 Evo | Lamborghini 5.2 L V10 | DAY | SEB | MDO | DET | WGL | MOS | LIM | ELK | VIR | LAG | PET; 10 | 55th | 21 | |
| 2020 | Michael Shank Racing with Curb-Agajanian | GTD | Acura NSX GT3 Evo | Acura 3.5 L Turbo V6 | DAY; 10 | DAY | SEB | ELK | VIR | ATL; 1 | MOH | CLT | **PET**; 10 | LGA | SEB; 3 | 26th | 107 | |
