= 2013 Formula Challenge Japan =

Japanese formula racing season

The 2013 Formula Challenge Japan was a multi-event motor racing championship for open-wheel formula racing cars, and the eighth and final season of the Formula Challenge Japan racing series, a young driver development series jointly supported by Honda, Toyota, and Nissan. The championship featured a mix of manufacturer-affiliated drivers and independent entries, and commenced on 30 March and ended on 10 November.

The championship was won by Toyota-backed rookie Kenta Yamashita after a season-long battle where the championship lead changed hands numerous times. Yamashita claimed the title after a hat-trick of wins at the final round in Fuji, more than doubling his points tally to emerge victorious in front of Honda-supported Tsubasa Takahashi and fellow Toyota junior Keishi Ishikawa. Hiroki Shinotani, who had led the championship going into the final round, slipped to fourth in the standings. The season saw five winners, with Yamashita claiming four, Takahashi winning thrice, Shinotani and Shō Tsuboi claiming two each, and Shōta Kiyohara dominating a single round.

This was the final season of Formula Challenge Japan before it was replaced by Japan Formula 4 in 2014, and by the FIA F4 Japanese Championship in 2015.

== Teams and drivers ==
Team	No.	Driver	Rounds
FTRS FCJ; Tokyo Toyopet FTRS; FTRS Scholarship FCJ; Ishiyaki Ramen Volcano FTRS FCJ; FTRS PTT; FTRS Scholarship SMR; FTRS TMC FCJ; Binchou & Dohtonbori FTRS; Autobacs FTRS FCJ	1	(Japan) Kenta Yamashita	All
FTRS FCJ; Tokyo Toyopet FTRS; FTRS Scholarship FCJ; Ishiyaki Ramen Volcano FTRS FCJ; FTRS PTT; FTRS Scholarship SMR; FTRS TMC FCJ; Binchou & Dohtonbori FTRS; Autobacs FTRS FCJ	2	(Japan) Yūki Nemoto	All
FTRS FCJ; Tokyo Toyopet FTRS; FTRS Scholarship FCJ; Ishiyaki Ramen Volcano FTRS FCJ; FTRS PTT; FTRS Scholarship SMR; FTRS TMC FCJ; Binchou & Dohtonbori FTRS; Autobacs FTRS FCJ	3	(Japan) Hiroki Shinotani	All
FTRS FCJ; Tokyo Toyopet FTRS; FTRS Scholarship FCJ; Ishiyaki Ramen Volcano FTRS FCJ; FTRS PTT; FTRS Scholarship SMR; FTRS TMC FCJ; Binchou & Dohtonbori FTRS; Autobacs FTRS FCJ	6	(Japan) Yuichi Mikasa	All
FTRS FCJ; Tokyo Toyopet FTRS; FTRS Scholarship FCJ; Ishiyaki Ramen Volcano FTRS FCJ; FTRS PTT; FTRS Scholarship SMR; FTRS TMC FCJ; Binchou & Dohtonbori FTRS; Autobacs FTRS FCJ	7	(Thailand) Nanin Indra-Payoong	1–9
FTRS FCJ; Tokyo Toyopet FTRS; FTRS Scholarship FCJ; Ishiyaki Ramen Volcano FTRS FCJ; FTRS PTT; FTRS Scholarship SMR; FTRS TMC FCJ; Binchou & Dohtonbori FTRS; Autobacs FTRS FCJ	9	(Japan) Shinya Sean Michimi	All
FTRS FCJ; Tokyo Toyopet FTRS; FTRS Scholarship FCJ; Ishiyaki Ramen Volcano FTRS FCJ; FTRS PTT; FTRS Scholarship SMR; FTRS TMC FCJ; Binchou & Dohtonbori FTRS; Autobacs FTRS FCJ	11	(Japan) Shō Tsuboi	All
FTRS FCJ; Tokyo Toyopet FTRS; FTRS Scholarship FCJ; Ishiyaki Ramen Volcano FTRS FCJ; FTRS PTT; FTRS Scholarship SMR; FTRS TMC FCJ; Binchou & Dohtonbori FTRS; Autobacs FTRS FCJ	12	(Japan) Takuma Imai	All
FTRS FCJ; Tokyo Toyopet FTRS; FTRS Scholarship FCJ; Ishiyaki Ramen Volcano FTRS FCJ; FTRS PTT; FTRS Scholarship SMR; FTRS TMC FCJ; Binchou & Dohtonbori FTRS; Autobacs FTRS FCJ	13	(Japan) Shūhei Hayashi	All
FTRS FCJ; Tokyo Toyopet FTRS; FTRS Scholarship FCJ; Ishiyaki Ramen Volcano FTRS FCJ; FTRS PTT; FTRS Scholarship SMR; FTRS TMC FCJ; Binchou & Dohtonbori FTRS; Autobacs FTRS FCJ	15	(Japan) Ren Nagabuchi	8–9
HFDP Scholarship/SRS-F/Kotira R HFDP ARTA	4	(Japan) Tsubasa Takahashi	All
HFDP Scholarship/SRS-F/Kotira R HFDP ARTA	5	(Japan) Keishi Ishikawa	All
HFDP Scholarship/SRS-F/Kotira R HFDP ARTA	8	(Japan) Shōta Kiyohara	1–9
Exedy Racing Team	10	(Japan) Ai Miura	All
NDDP FCJ	14	(Japan) Kiyoto Fujinami	All
Honda Cars Mie Team SBT	16	(Japan) Ryūnosuke Shibata	10–12
Le Beausset Racing Academy	17	(Japan) Rintaro Kubo	10–12
B-MAX	18	(Japan) Yūki Asahara	10–12

== Race calendar and results ==
Round	Circuit	Date	Pole position	Fastest lap	Winning driver
1	Fuji Speedway, Oyama	30 March	(Japan) Kiyoto Fujinami	(Japan) Keishi Ishikawa	(Japan) Shō Tsuboi
2	Fuji Speedway, Oyama	31 March	(Japan) Kiyoto Fujinami	(Japan) Shō Tsuboi	(Japan) Tsubasa Takahashi
3	Twin Ring Motegi, Motegi	11 May	(Thailand) Nanin Indra-Payoong	(Japan) Kenta Yamashita	(Japan) Kenta Yamashita
4	Twin Ring Motegi, Motegi	12 May	(Japan) Shinya Sean Michimi	(Japan) Hiroki Shinotani	(Japan) Tsubasa Takahashi
5	Fuji Speedway, Oyama	22 June	(Japan) Kiyoto Fujinami	(Japan) Hiroki Shinotani	(Japan) Hiroki Shinotani
6	Fuji Speedway, Oyama	22 June	(Japan) Kiyoto Fujinami	(Japan) Kiyoto Fujinami	(Japan) Hiroki Shinotani
7	Fuji Speedway, Oyama	23 June	(Japan) Kiyoto Fujinami	(Japan) Hiroki Shinotani	(Japan) Tsubasa Takahashi
8	Fuji Speedway, Oyama	24 August	(Japan) Shōta Kiyohara	(Japan) Shōta Kiyohara	(Japan) Shōta Kiyohara
9	Fuji Speedway, Oyama	25 August	(Japan) Shinya Sean Michimi	(Japan) Keishi Ishikawa	(Japan) Shō Tsuboi
10	Suzuka Circuit, Suzuka	9 November	(Japan) Kenta Yamashita	(Japan) Kenta Yamashita	(Japan) Kenta Yamashita
11	Suzuka Circuit, Suzuka	9 November	(Japan) Kenta Yamashita	(Japan) Kenta Yamashita	(Japan) Kenta Yamashita
12	Suzuka Circuit, Suzuka	10 November	(Japan) Kenta Yamashita	(Japan) Tsubasa Takahashi	(Japan) Kenta Yamashita

== Championship standings ==
=== Drivers' Championship ===
Points were awarded to the top six classified finishers, with one point awarded for pole position and fastest lap respectively.

1	2	3	4	5	6	PP	FL
10	7	5	3	2	1	**1**	1

Pos.	Driver	FUJ		MOT		FUJ			FUJ		SUZ			Points
1	(Japan) Kenta Yamashita	5	3	1	6	10	3	7	7	2	**1**	**1**	1	65
2	(Japan) Tsubasa Takahashi	12	1	8	1	4	6	1	10	9	2	2	3	54
3	(Japan) Keishi Ishikawa	2	2	3	8	5	2	13	8	6	3	3	2	48
4	(Japan) Hiroki Shinotani	6	6	9	4	1	1	2	5	3	6	4	8	46
5	(Japan) Shō Tsuboi	1	7	6	7	6	7	5	3	1	4	6	5	36
6	(Japan) Kiyoto Fujinami	**4**	**Ret**	5	3	**2**	4	3	15†	14	10	8	7	29
7	(Japan) Shinya Sean Michimi	9	5	4	**2**	3	13	11	2	**13**	9	7	12	26
8	(Japan) Shōta Kiyohara	3	11	WD	WD	8	8	8	**1**	5				19
9	(Japan) Yuichi Mikasa	7	4	Ret	9	7	5	4	4	12	5	5	6	16
10	(Thailand) Nanin Indra-Payoong	Ret	8	**2**	5	13	12	12	14	7				10
11	(Japan) Yūki Nemoto	10	12	7	10	12	11	10	6	4	12	15	4	7
12	(Japan) Shūhei Hayashi	8	10	10	11	DSQ	9	6	13	8	8	10	Ret	1
-	(Japan) Takuma Imai	11	13	11	13	11	14	Ret	11	11	7	11	13	0
-	(Japan) Ai Miura	13	9	Ret	12	9	10	9	9	15	13	12	11	0
-	(Japan) Ryūnosuke Shibata										11	9	9	0
-	(Japan) Ren Nagabuchi								12	10				0
-	(Japan) Rintaro Kubo										Ret	13	10	0
-	(Japan) Yūki Asahara										14	14	14	0
Pos.	Driver	FUJ		MOT		FUJ			FUJ		SUZ			Points

Key
Colour	Result
Gold	Race winner
Silver	2nd place
Bronze	3rd place
Green	Points finish
Blue	Non-points finish
Blue	Non-classified finish (NC)
Purple	Did not finish (Ret)
Black	Disqualified (DSQ)
Black	Excluded (EX)
White	Did not start (DNS)
White	Race cancelled (C)
White	Withdrew (WD)
Blank	Did not participate

**Bold** – Pole
Italics – Fastest Lap
