= 2012 Formula Challenge Japan =

Japanese formula racing season

The 2012 Formula Challenge Japan was a multi-event motor racing championship for open-wheel formula racing cars, and the seventh running of the Formula Challenge Japan series, a young driver development series jointly supported by Honda, Toyota, and Nissan. The championship featured a mix of manufacturer-affiliated drivers and independent entries, and commenced on 7 April and ended on 4 November.

The championship featured a close battle between Honda-backed Nobuharu Matsushita and Toyota-supported Ryō Hirakawa; both drivers scored five wins over the course of the 12-race season, with Nissan-supported Mitsunori Takaboshi taking the remaining two victories. Matsushita would ultimately claim the championship title by countback over Hirakawa, with Takaboshi finishing third in the points standings.

== Teams and drivers ==
Team	No.	Driver	Rounds
FTRS Scholarship; FTRS; FTRS Clarion Hiroshima Toyopet; FTRS PTT; FTRS TMC; FTRS Ishiyaki Ramen Volcano	1	(Japan) Shintarō Kawabata	All
FTRS Scholarship; FTRS; FTRS Clarion Hiroshima Toyopet; FTRS PTT; FTRS TMC; FTRS Ishiyaki Ramen Volcano	3	(Japan) Hiroki Shinotani	All
FTRS Scholarship; FTRS; FTRS Clarion Hiroshima Toyopet; FTRS PTT; FTRS TMC; FTRS Ishiyaki Ramen Volcano	4	(Japan) Ryō Hirakawa	All
FTRS Scholarship; FTRS; FTRS Clarion Hiroshima Toyopet; FTRS PTT; FTRS TMC; FTRS Ishiyaki Ramen Volcano	6	(Thailand) Nanin Indra-Payoong	All
FTRS Scholarship; FTRS; FTRS Clarion Hiroshima Toyopet; FTRS PTT; FTRS TMC; FTRS Ishiyaki Ramen Volcano	9	(Japan) Shinya Michimi	All
FTRS Scholarship; FTRS; FTRS Clarion Hiroshima Toyopet; FTRS PTT; FTRS TMC; FTRS Ishiyaki Ramen Volcano	11	(Japan) Shō Tsuboi	All
FTRS Scholarship; FTRS; FTRS Clarion Hiroshima Toyopet; FTRS PTT; FTRS TMC; FTRS Ishiyaki Ramen Volcano	14	(Japan) Yuichi Mikasa	All
HFDP Scholarship/SRS-F/Kotira; HFDP ARTA	2	(Japan) Shun Kurosaki	All
HFDP Scholarship/SRS-F/Kotira; HFDP ARTA	8	(Japan) Shōta Kiyohara	All
HFDP Scholarship/SRS-F/Kotira; HFDP ARTA	10	(Japan) Nobuharu Matsushita	All
HFDP Scholarship/SRS-F/Kotira; HFDP ARTA	15	(Japan) Tsubasa Takahashi	8–9
HFDP Scholarship/SRS-F/Kotira; HFDP ARTA	20	(Japan) Keishi Ishikawa	5–7, 10–12
Team SPV	5	(Japan) Kōhei Sutō	All
Houka Racing with Dunlop	7	(Japan) Ryō Ogawa	All
NDDP Daishin; NDDP	12	(Japan) Mitsunori Takaboshi	All
NDDP Daishin; NDDP	13	(Japan) Kiyoto Fujinami	All
Exedy Racing Team	16	(Japan) Ai Miura	All
Tokyo Motor Sports College	17	(Japan) Yūdai Jinkawa	All
Honda Cars Mie-kita SBT	18	(Japan) Ryūnosuke Shibata	1–2, 8–12
Kim's Racing	19	(South Korea) Im Che-won	8–12
GRID	21	(Japan) Takahiro Matsuda	10–12

== Race calendar and results ==
Round	Circuit	Date	Pole position	Fastest lap	Winning driver
1	Fuji Speedway, Oyama	7 April	(Japan) Ryō Hirakawa	(Japan) Ryō Hirakawa	(Japan) Ryō Hirakawa
2	Fuji Speedway, Oyama	8 April	(Japan) Ryō Hirakawa	(Japan) Ryō Hirakawa	(Japan) Ryō Hirakawa
3	Twin Ring Motegi, Motegi	12 May	(Japan) Mitsunori Takaboshi	(Japan) Mitsunori Takaboshi	(Japan) Ryō Hirakawa
4	Twin Ring Motegi, Motegi	13 May	(Japan) Mitsunori Takaboshi	(Japan) Mitsunori Takaboshi	(Japan) Mitsunori Takaboshi
5	Fuji Speedway, Oyama	1 September	(Japan) Nobuharu Matsushita	(Japan) Nobuharu Matsushita	(Japan) Nobuharu Matsushita
6	Fuji Speedway, Oyama	1 September	(Japan) Nobuharu Matsushita	(Japan) Nobuharu Matsushita	(Japan) Nobuharu Matsushita
7	Fuji Speedway, Oyama	2 September	(Japan) Nobuharu Matsushita	(Japan) Nobuharu Matsushita	(Japan) Nobuharu Matsushita
8	Suzuka Circuit, Suzuka	6 October	(Japan) Ryō Hirakawa	(Japan) Nobuharu Matsushita	(Japan) Nobuharu Matsushita
9	Suzuka Circuit, Suzuka	7 October	(Japan) Ryō Hirakawa	(Japan) Nobuharu Matsushita	(Japan) Ryō Hirakawa
10	Suzuka Circuit, Suzuka	3 November	(Japan) Ryō Hirakawa	(Japan) Ryō Hirakawa	(Japan) Ryō Hirakawa
11	Suzuka Circuit, Suzuka	3 November	(Japan) Ryō Hirakawa	(Japan) Mitsunori Takaboshi	(Japan) Nobuharu Matsushita
12	Suzuka Circuit, Suzuka	4 November	(Japan) Ryō Hirakawa	(Japan) Ryō Hirakawa	(Japan) Mitsunori Takaboshi

== Championship standings ==
=== Drivers' Championship ===
Points were awarded to the top six classified finishers, with one point awarded for pole position and fastest lap respectively.

1	2	3	4	5	6	PP	FL
10	7	5	3	2	1	**1**	1

Pos.	Driver	FUJ		MOT		FUJ			SUZ		SUZ			Points
1	(Japan) Nobuharu Matsushita	2	2	3	5	**1**	1	1	1	15	2	1	2	91
2	(Japan) Ryō Hirakawa	**1**	**1**	1	3	2	2	3	**2**	1	**1**	Ret	5	91
3	(Japan) Mitsunori Takaboshi	4	15	**2**	**1**	5	3	4	4	2	4	2	1	65
4	(Japan) Shōta Kiyohara	3	3	4	4	4	4	2	3	14	6	7	6	36
5	(Japan) Hiroki Shinotani	5	14	5	2	3	12	5	12	3	3	18	8	28
6	(Japan) Shintarō Kawabata	Ret	6	Ret	6	7	17	6	5	16	7	3	3	15
7	(Japan) Shō Tsuboi	11	7	12	12	13	5	10	13	Ret	5	4	18	7
8	(Japan) Ryō Ogawa	6	4	6	7	12	11	14	10	6	12	6	7	7
9	(Japan) Keishi Ishikawa					15	8	Ret			11	5	4	5
10	(Japan) Shinya Michimi	12	9	10	Ret	9	9	11	8	4	9	8	9	3
11	(Japan) Ryūnosuke Shibata	10	8						9	5	15	12	12	2
12	(Japan) Yuichi Mikasa	16	5	11	10	14	10	15	18	10	10	10	Ret	2
13	(Japan) Kiyoto Fujinami	9	10	9	11	8	6	7	6	9	8	17	Ret	2
14	(Japan) Kōhei Sutō	8	12	7	8	6	16	8	7	7	Ret	11	11	1
-	(Japan) Shun Kurosaki	7	Ret	8	14	10	7	9	19	Ret	14	16	15	0
-	(Japan) Tsubasa Takahashi								16	8				0
-	(Thailand) Nanin Indra-Payoong	14	13	13	DSQ	11	14	13	14	12	13	9	10	0
-	(Japan) Yūdai Jinkawa	15	Ret	14	9	16	13	16	17	Ret	17	14	13	0
-	(South Korea) Im Che-won								11	11	18	Ret	14	0
-	(Japan) Ai Miura	13	11	15	13	DSQ	15	12	15	13	19	15	16	0
-	(Japan) Takahiro Matsuda										16	13	17	0
Pos.	Driver	FUJ		MOT		FUJ			SUZ		SUZ			Points

Key
Colour	Result
Gold	Race winner
Silver	2nd place
Bronze	3rd place
Green	Points finish
Blue	Non-points finish
Blue	Non-classified finish (NC)
Purple	Did not finish (Ret)
Black	Disqualified (DSQ)
Black	Excluded (EX)
White	Did not start (DNS)
White	Race cancelled (C)
White	Withdrew (WD)
Blank	Did not participate

**Bold** – Pole
Italics – Fastest Lap
