= Kiyoto Fujinami =

Japanese racing driver

Kiyoto Fujinami 藤波清斗
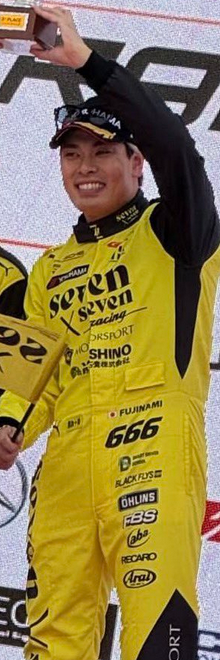
- Kiyoto Fujinami in 2025
- Nationality: (Japan) Japanese
- Born: 13 April 1995 (age 31) Tokyo, Japan

Super GT - GT300 career
- Debut season: 2017
- Current team: Seven x Seven Racing
- Categorisation: FIA Silver
- Car number: 666
- Engine: Porsche
- Former teams: JLOC, Kondo Racing, Team Mach
- Starts: 36
- Wins: 5
- Podiums: 8
- Best finish: 1st in 2020 and 2022

Previous series
- 2022, 2024 2020 2019 2018 2012–13: GT World Challenge Asia; Super Formula Lights; F3 Asian Championship; Japanese Formula Three Championship; Formula Challenge Japan

Championship titles
- 2020, 2022: Super GT - GT300

Kiyoto Fujinami (藤波清斗, Fujinami Kiyoto; born 13 April 1995) is a Japanese professional racing driver who currently competes in Super GT for Team Mach. He is a two-time champion in the series, having won the GT300 class title with Kondō Racing in 2020 and 2022.

== Career ==
Following success in karting, headlined by the 2010 CIK-FIA Asia Pacific KF2 Championship, Fujinami entered the Formula Challenge Japan in 2012 as a member of the Nissan Driver Development Programme (NDDP). He scored two points in his first season on the way to 13th in the championship. Returning for 2013, he scored five pole positions and three podiums over the 12 races, ending with 29 points and sixth in the championship.

Fujinami transitioned to sports car racing in 2014, racing in the ST-3 class of the Super Taikyu Series with Techno First Racing Team. He scored his first class win at Autopolis aboard the No. 34 Nissan Fairlady Z34. In 2015, Fujinami moved up to the ST-X (GT3) class with Team Mach, and won at Okayama in the No. 5 Nissan GT-R NISMO GT3. The entry was acquired by GTNET Motor Sports in 2016 where Fujinami continued to race in the ST-X class.

Fujinami helped lead GTNET Motor Sports to consecutive ST-X championships in 2018 and 2019, with overall victories in the Fuji Super TEC 24 Hours in each of these seasons. Fujinami added a third Fuji 24 Hours win in 2021.

For 2018, Fujinami returned to single-seaters with B-Max Racing in the Japanese Formula 3 Championship, but over seven races scored no points finishes. He fared better in the 2019 F3 Asian Championship, with 14 points in three races for the team.

=== Super GT (2017-2022, 2024) ===
Fujinami made his Super GT debut in 2017 with Team Mach, driving the No. 5 Toyota 86 MC (MC86). That season, he earned three points in seven races, and finished 22nd in the standings with a best finish of eighth at Autopolis. He did not receive a full season contract for 2018, but returned to Team Mach as a third driver at the Fuji GT 500 Mile Race.

Fujinami earned another part-time contract in 2019, this time driving for JLOC in their #87 Lamborghini Huracan GT3. At the Fuji GT 500 Mile Race, Fujinami, Andre Couto, and Tsubasa Takahashi took the GT300 class win, ending a five-year winless drought for JLOC.

In 2020, Fujinami signed a full-time contract and won the Super GT GT300 class championship alongside Joao Paulo de Oliveira in their #56 Nissan GT-R. Fujinami and Oliveira won two races at Twin Ring Motegi and Fuji Speedway, securing a further podium and finishing with 71 points. In 2021, Fujinami and Oliveira fell short of a repeat championship, despite winning at Okayama and two further podiums at Sugo and Motegi. They finished second in the standings to the Subaru R&D Sport team of Takuto Iguchi and Hideki Yamauchi.

Fujinami continued racing with Oliveira and Kondo Racing in 2022. For the second straight season, the pair won the opening round at Okayama and led the championship at the half way point of the season. In the final round at Motegi, Fujinami and Oliveira won their second title in three years, despite Oliveira losing a wheel late in the race. They won the championship after championship rival Riki Okusa's teammate Ryuichiro Tomita conceded fifth place on the last lap.

After missing the 2023 season entirely, Fujinami returned to Super GT in 2024 with Team Mach alongside new co-driver Yusuke Shiotsu.

==== 2022-23 off-season controversy ====
After two championships in three seasons, Fujinami tested a Nissan Z GT500 at Fuji Speedway in December 2022. Fujinami then joined Kondo Racing for a private manufacturers test in their GT500 car on 24 January at Suzuka Circuit, with the expectation that he would be named as a GT500 driver for the upcoming season. But when Nissan announced its 2023 driver line-ups, Fujinami was omitted from the list of drivers.

It later emerged that Fujinami, who also owns a privateer team, KF Motorsport that competes in the FCR-Vita Series, had physically attacked a member of his team. On 17 February, the same day that Nissan confirmed Teppei Natori as his replacement at the Kondo Racing GT300 team, Fujinami apologised for the incident through his social media accounts. Fujinami signed a GT500 reserve driver contract with Nissan for the 2023 season, and was retained at GTNET Motor Sports in the Super Taikyu Series. He left Nissan after the 2023 season, ending a 12-year affiliation with the manufacturer.

== Racing record ==
=== Career summary ===
Season	Series	Team	Races	Wins	Poles	F/Laps	Podiums	Points	Position
2012	Formula Challenge Japan	NDDP	12	0	0	0	0	2	13th
2013	Formula Challenge Japan	NDDP FCJ	12	0	5	1	3	2	13th
2017	Super Taikyū - ST-X	GTNET Motor Sports	6	1	0	0	2	68.5‡	5th‡
2017	Super GT - GT300	Team Mach	6	0	0	0	0	3	22nd
2018	Japanese Formula 3 Championship	B-Max Racing	7	0	0	0	0	0	NC
2018	Super GT - GT300	Team Mach	1	0	0	0	0	0	NC
2019	F3 Asian Championship	B-Max Racing	3	0	0	0	0	14	16th
2019	Super GT - GT300	JLOC	2	1	0	0	1	25	13th
2020	Super Formula Lights	B-Max Racing	3	0	0	0	0	2	13th
2020	Super GT - GT300	Kondō Racing	8	2	0	0	3	71	**1st**
2021	Super GT - GT300	Kondō Racing	8	1	0	0	3	55	**2nd**
2021	Super Taikyu - ST-X	GTNET Motor Sports	6	1	0	3	2	82‡	4th‡
2022	Super GT - GT300	Kondō Racing	8	1	0	0	2	52	**1st**
2022	GT World Challenge Asia - GT3	Yogibo Racing	8	2	2	0	3	88	4th
2022	Super Taikyū - ST-X	GTNET Motor Sports	7	1	0	5	3	97.5‡	4th‡
2023	Super Taikyū - ST-X	GTNET Motor Sports	6	0	0	2	2	95‡	5th‡
2023	Super GT - GT500	Nismo	Reserve Driver						
2024	Super GT - GT300	Team Mach	8	0	0	0	0	0	NC
2024	Super Taikyū - ST-X	GTNET MotorSports	6	1	2	3	2	107.5‡	5th‡
2024	Porsche Carrera Cup Japan	Bingo Racing	1	0	0	0	1	17	17th
2024	GT World Challenge Asia	Porsche Centre Okazaki	2	0	0	?	0	0	NC
2024	SRO Japan Cup - GT3	Seven x Seven With KFM	2	1	1	?	1	0	NC†
2025	SRO Japan Cup - GT3	Seven x Seven Racing	2	0	0	0	0	24	13th
2025	Super GT - GT300	Seven x Seven Racing	4	1	0	0	2	49	14th
2025	Super Taikyū - ST-X	Seven x Seven Racing	5	4	2	N/A	5	129‡	**1st‡**
2025	Middle East Trophy - 992	Seven x Seven Racing							
2025	992 Endurance Cup	Team Parker Racing							
2025–26	Asian Le Mans Series - GT	Proton Competition							
2026	Super GT - GT300	Seven x Seven Racing	3	0	0	0	0	27	25th
2026	Super Taikyu - ST-X	Bankcy x Racing							
2026	Super Taikyu - ST-X	GTNET MotorSports							

‡ Teams' standings.

=== Complete Super GT results ===
(key) (Races in bold indicate pole position) (Races in italics indicate fastest lap)

Year	Team	Car	Class	1	2	3	4	5	6	7	8	9	DC	Pts
2017	Team Mach	Toyota 86 MC	GT300	OKA; 17	FSW; 19	AUT; 8	SUG; 12	FSW; 28	SUZ; 22	CHA	TRM; 15		22nd	3
2018	Team Mach	Toyota 86 MC	GT300	OKA	FSW	SUZ	CHA	FSW; 19	SUG	AUT	TRM		NC	0
2019	JLOC	Lamborghini Huracán GT3	GT300	OKA	FSW; 11	SUZ	CHA	FSW; 1	AUT	SUG	TRM		13th	25
2020	Kondo Racing	Nissan GT-R NISMO GT3	GT300	FSW; 4	FSW; 5	SUZ; 9	TRM; 20	FSW; 1	SUZ; 16	TRM; 1	FSW; 2		**1st**	**74**
2021	Kondo Racing	Nissan GT-R NISMO GT3	GT300	OKA; 1	FUJ; 7	SUZ; 26	MOT; 8	SUG; 3	AUT; 11	MOT; 3	FUJ; 5		2nd	55
2022	Kondo Racing	Nissan GT-R NISMO GT3	GT300	OKA; 1	FUJ; 7‡	SUZ; 3	FUJ; 6	SUZ; 13	SUG; 4	AUT; 5	MOT; 19		1st	52
2024	Team Mach	Toyota 86 MC	GT300	OKA; 22	FUJ; 18	SUZ; 25	FUJ; 15	SUG; 17	AUT; Ret	MOT; 22†	SUZ; 12		NC	0
2025	Seven x Seven Racing	Porsche 911 GT3 R (992)	GT300	OKA; 8	FUJ; 24	SEP	FS1	FS2	SUZ	SUG	AUT; 1	MOT; 3	14th	49
2026	Seven x Seven Racing	Porsche 911 GT3 R (992)	GT300	OKA; 12	FUJ; 4	FUJ; 6	SUZ; WD	SUG	AUT	MOT	MOT		25th	27

^{‡} Half points awarded as less than 75% of race distance was completed.

=== Complete Japanese Formula 3 Championship results ===
(key) (Races in bold indicate pole position) (Races in italics indicate fastest lap)

Year	Team	Engine	1	2	3	4	5	6	7	8	9	10	11	12	13	14	15	16	17	18	19	20	21	Pos	Points
2018	B-Max Racing Team	Volkswagen	SUZ; 1	SUZ; 2	SUG1; 1	SUG1; 2	FUJ1; 1	FUJ1; 2	OKA1; 1	OKA1; 2	OKA1; 3	MOT; 1; 9	MOT; 2; 8	MOT; 3; 10	OKA2; 1	OKA2; 2	OKA2; 3	SUG2; 1; 9	SUG2; 2; 14	SUG2; 3; 7	SUG2; 4; 7	FUJ2; 1	FUJ2; 2	14th	0

=== Complete F3 Asian Championship results ===
(key) (Races in bold indicate pole position; races in italics indicate fastest lap)

Year	Entrant	1	2	3	4	5	6	7	8	9	10	11	12	13	14	15	DC	Points
2019	B-Max Racing Team	SEP; 1	SEP; 2	SEP; 3	CHA; 1	CHA; 2	CHA; 3	SUZ; 1; 8	SUZ; 2; 5	SUZ; 3 Ret	SIC1; 1	SIC1; 2	SIC1; 3	SIC2; 1	SIC2; 2	SIC2; 3	16th	14

=== Complete Super Formula Lights Championship results ===
(key) (Races in bold indicate pole position) (Races in italics indicate fastest lap)

Year	Team	1	2	3	4	5	6	7	8	9	10	11	12	13	14	15	16	17	Points	Rank
2020	B-Max Racing Team	MOT; 1; 6	MOT; 2; 6	MOT; 3; 8	OKA; 1	OKA; 2	SUG; 1	SUG; 2	SUG; 3	AUT; 1	AUT; 2	AUT; 3	SUZ; 1	SUZ; 2	SUZ; 3	FSW; 1	FSW; 2	FSW; 3	13th	2

Sporting positions
Preceded by Nirei Fukuzumi; Shinichi Takagi	Super GT; GT300 Champion; 2020; With: João Paulo de Oliveira	Succeeded by Takuto Iguchi; Hideki Yamauchi
Preceded by Takuto Iguchi; Hideki Yamauchi	Super GT; GT300 Champion; 2022; With: João Paulo de Oliveira	Succeeded by Incumbent
