= Kenta Yamashita =

Japanese racing driver

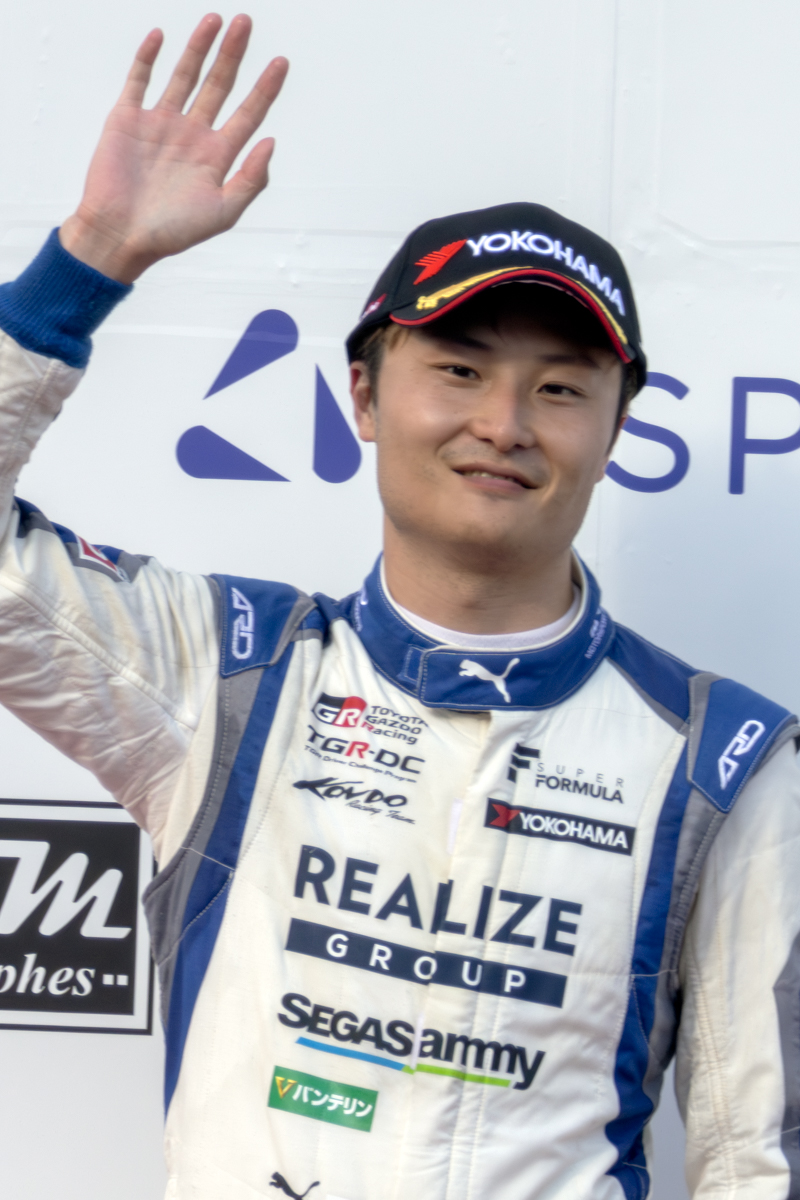
- Yamashita at the podium of the 2024 Super Formula Motegi round
- Nationality: (Japan) Japanese
- Born: 3 August 1995 (age 31) Chiba, Japan

Super GT - GT500 career
- Debut season: 2017
- Current team: TGR Team au TOM'S
- Categorisation: FIA Platinum
- Car number: 1
- Former teams: Racing Project Bandoh, Team LeMans, SARD, Rookie Racing
- Starts: 68
- Wins: 11
- Podiums: 22
- Poles: 6
- Fastest laps: 3
- Best finish: 1st in 2019, 2024, 2025

Super Formula career
- Debut season: 2017
- Current team: KCMG
- Car number: 8
- Former teams: Kondo Racing
- Starts: 83
- Wins: 1
- Podiums: 8
- Poles: 3
- Fastest laps: 0
- Best finish: 5th in 2019

Previous series
- 2019-20 2015-17 2014–16 2013 2012: FIA WEC - LMP2; Super GT - GT300; Japanese Formula 3 Championship; Formula Challenge Japan; Motegi Championship Formula Super FJ

Championship titles
- 2019, 2024-25 2016 2013 2012: Super GT; Japanese Formula 3 Championship; Formula Challenge Japan; Motegi Championship Formula Super FJ

Kenta Yamashita (山下 健太, Yamashita Kenta; born 3 August 1995) is a Japanese racing driver for Toyota Gazoo Racing, currently competing in Super GT for TOM'S and in Super Formula for KCMG. He won the GT500-class Super GT championship title in 2019, 2024 and 2025. He previously won the 2016 All-Japan Formula 3 Championship and the 2013 Formula Challenge Japan titles.

== Career ==
=== Karting ===
Yamashita competed in karts before graduating to single-seater cars in 2012.

=== Formula Super FJ and Formula Challenge Japan ===
Yamashita began his racing car career in the 2012 Motegi Championship Formula Super FJ, which he won in his first season. In all four starts, he took the pole, fastest lap, and race win. In 2013, he progressed to the Formula Challenge Japan series, which was a racing category intended for drivers between entry level and Formula 3. He scored seven podiums and in 12 races, including four wins, and took the championship title.

=== All-Japan Formula Three ===
In 2014, Yamashita graduated to the All-Japan Formula Three Championship with the Petronas Team TOM'S. He finished runner-up in the championship to the more experienced Nobuharu Matsushita.

In 2015, Yamashita continued to race in the All-Japan Formula Three Championship with TOM'S, he managed to clinch runners up, just lose out to Nick Cassidy the eventual champion. 2016, Yamashita won the title in the final round, pips out Jann Mardenborough to the title.

=== Super GT ===
In 2015, Yamashita made his debut in GT300 class with Porsche Team KTR alongside Alexandre Imperatori. He then made one off appearance the next season with Tsuchiya Engineering. He stayed with the team full time afterwards. That season, he won his first race alongside Takamitsu Matsui.

Yamashita made a one off appearance with Racing Project Bandoh in Fuji Speedway. Then for 2018, he stepped up to GT500 with Bandoh, as he replaced Yuhi Sekiguchi. Yamashita then transferred to Lexus Team Wako's LeMans, replacing Felix Rosenqvist, who left Super GT to compete in the IndyCar Series. He then with Kazuya Oshima won the title at the final race of the season. That would be Team LeMans final title as the team discontinued their campaign in GT500. For 2020, Yamashita initially did not listed to compete in Super GT as he was focused to do WEC. But because of the pandemic, he only ran a couple of races in that year. He covered up for Heikki Kovalainen at Team SARD for Round 1 because Kovalalinen unable to enter Japan. Then Yamashita would race in two rounds as he replaced Nick Cassidy, as Cassidy began preparations for his debut in the 2021 FIA Formula E World Championship.

In 2021, Yamashita returned to the series full time in 2021, this time with new Rookie Racing with his former champion pair Oshima. During his time with the team, he won two races, and couple of podiums. For 2024, he moved to 2023 champion team Team au TOM'S to pair with Sho Tsuboi as he replaced Ritomo Miyata.

=== Super Formula ===
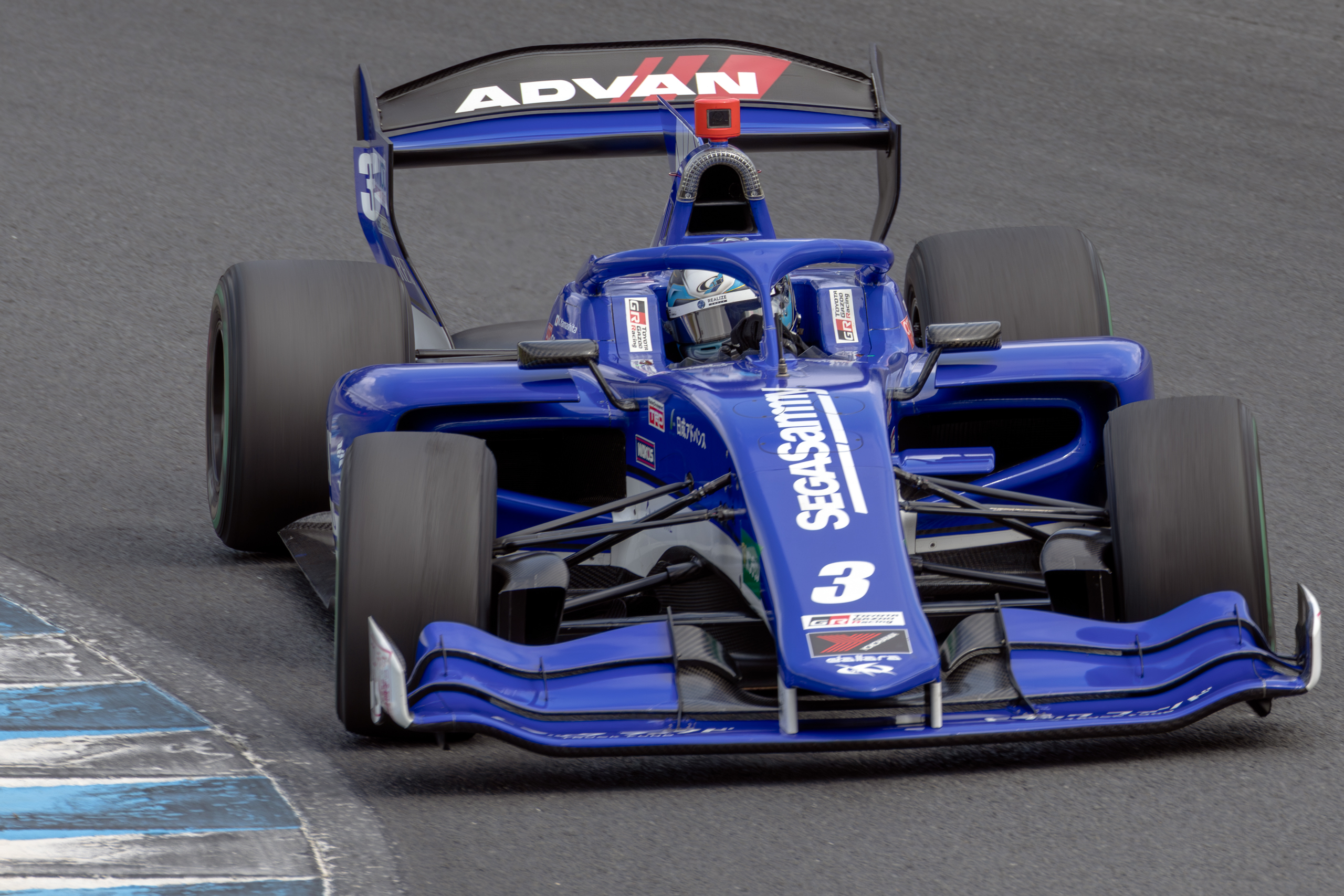
Yamashita during the 2024 Motegi round

Yamashita made his Super Formula debut in 2017 with Kondo Racing alongside his 2015 title rival Cassidy. Yamashita stayed with the same team for over nine years, and he managed only to win once.

In 2026, Yamashita moved to KCMG with Kalle Rovanperä.

=== FIA World Endurance Championship ===
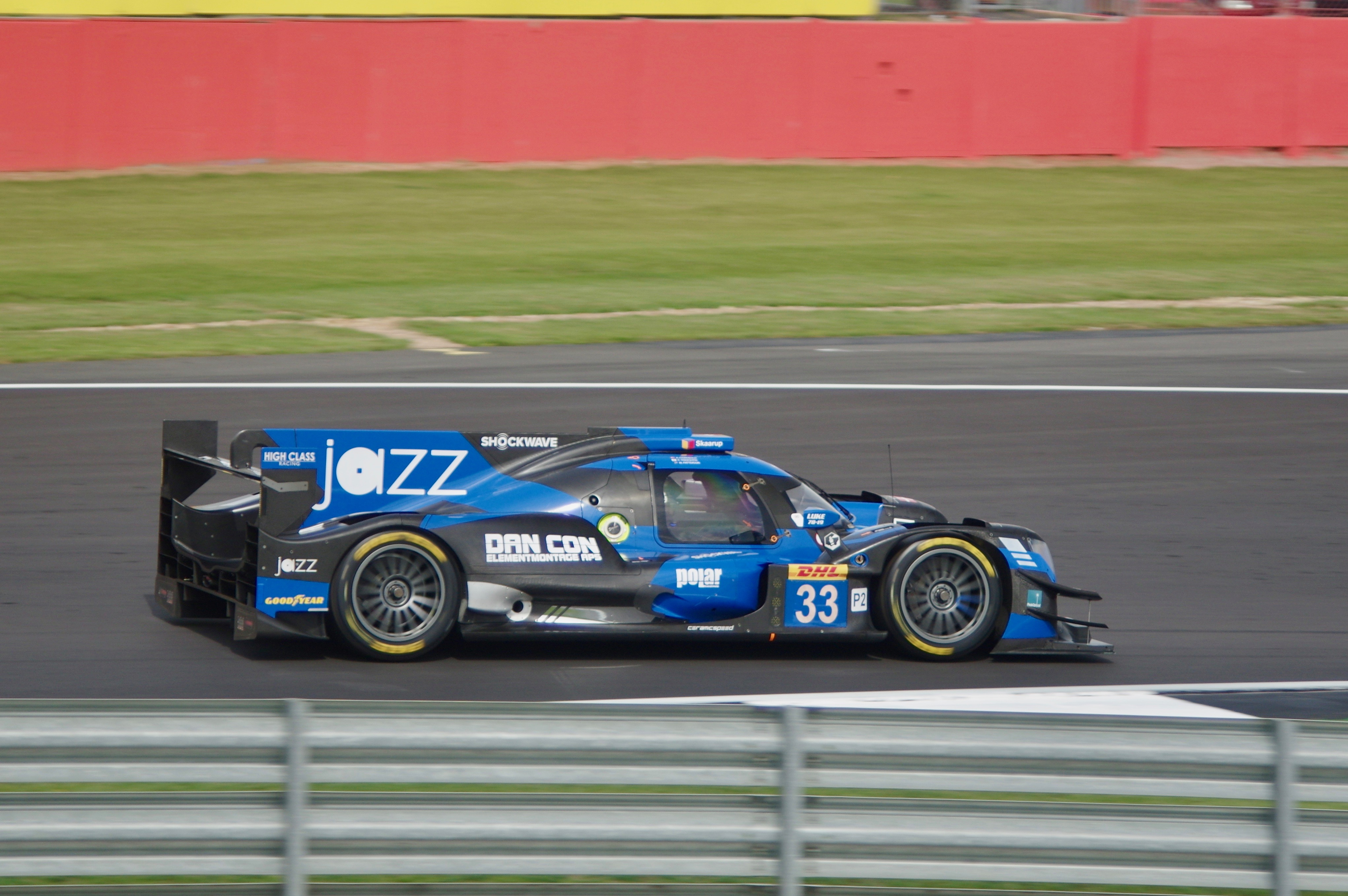
Yamashita at the 2019 4 Hours of Silverstone

Yamashita made his international racing debut in the 2019-20 FIA World Endurance Championship, driving in the LMP2 class for Danish team High Class Racing alongside Anders Fjordbach and amateur driver Mark Patterson. Yamashita would impress in qualifying sessions throughout the season, outmatching more experienced opponents on a regular basis, but the team would ultimately achieve little success in races and ended the season as the last-placed LMP2 team. Yamashita reached the Hyperpole session in qualifying for the 2020 24 Hours of Le Mans before the team was forced to retire with a gearbox problem.

== Racing record ==
=== Career summary ===
Season	Series	Team	Races	Wins	Poles	FLaps	Podiums	Points	Position
2012	Motegi Championship Formula Super FJ		4	4	4	4	4	64	**1st**
2013	Formula Challenge Japan	FTRS FCJ	12	4	2	3	7	65	**1st**
2014	Japanese Formula 3 Championship	Petronas Team TOM's	15	2	1	1	12	90	**2nd**
2014	Macau Grand Prix	Petronas Team TOM's	1	0	0	0	0	0	9th
2015	Japanese Formula 3 Championship	Petronas Team TOM's	17	5	5	5	13	113	**2nd**
2015	Macau Grand Prix	Petronas Team TOM's	1	0	0	0	0	N/A	15th
2015	Super GT - GT300	Porsche Team KTR	8	0	0	0	0	6	20th
2016	Japanese Formula 3 Championship	Team TOM's	17	7	7	4	10	113	**1st**
2016	Super GT - GT300	VivaC Team Tsuchiya	1	0	0	0	0	0	NC
2016	Macau Grand Prix	ThreeBond with T-Sport	1	0	0	0	0	N/A	4th
2017	Super GT - GT300	VivaC Team Tsuchiya	7	1	3	1	2	48	5th
2017	Super GT - GT500	Lexus Team WedsSport Bandoh	1	0	0	0	0	1	20th
2017	Super Formula	Kondō Racing	7	0	1	0	0	6.5	11th
2017	Super Taikyu - ST-3	Le Beausset Motorsports	4	2	2	1	4	95‡	**2nd‡**
2017	Macau Grand Prix	B-Max Racing Team	1	0	0	0	0	N/A	DNF
2018	Super GT - GT500	Lexus Team WedsSport Bandoh	8	0	0	0	2	32	11th
2018	Super Formula	Kondō Racing	6	0	0	0	1	11.5	9th
2018	Super Taikyu - ST-3	Le Beausset Motorsports	6	1	1	0	5	129‡	**2nd‡**
2019	Super GT - GT500	Lexus Team LeMans Wako's	8	2	1	0	4	85	**1st**
2019	Super Formula	Kondō Racing	7	1	0	0	2	21	5th
2019	Super Taikyu - ST-3	Le Beausset Motorsports	4	2	1	1	2	92‡	4th‡
2019–20	FIA World Endurance Championship - LMP2	High Class Racing	7	0	0	0	0	47	13th
2020	Super Formula	Kondo Racing	6	0	0	0	1	34	7th
2020	Super GT - GT500	TGR Team SARD	1	0	0	0	0	27	14th
2020	Super GT - GT500	TGR Team KeePer Tom's	2	0	1	1	1	27	14th
2020	24 Hours of Le Mans	High Class Racing	1	0	0	0	0	N/A	DNF
2021	Super GT - GT500	TGR ENEOS ROOKIE	8	1	1	1	3	52	5th
2021	Super Formula	Kondō Racing	7	0	0	0	0	8	14th
2021	Super Taikyu - ST-Q	ROOKIE Racing							
2022	Super GT - GT500	TGR ENEOS ROOKIE	8	1	1	0	2	49	5th
2022	Super Formula	Kondō Racing	10	0	0	0	0	19	15th
2022	Super Taikyu - ST-4	TOM'S Spirit	6	5	5	3	6	177.5‡	**1st‡**
2023	Super GT - GT500	TGR ENEOS ROOKIE	8	0	0	0	1	45	7th
2023	Super Formula	Kondō Racing	9	0	0	0	1	32	8th
2023	Super Taikyu - ST-Q	ORC ROOKIE Racing							
2024	Super GT - GT500	TGR Team au TOM'S	8	3	2	0	3	97	**1st**
2024	Super Formula	Kondō Racing	9	0	1	0	2	48.5	7th
2024	Super Taikyu - ST-Q	GR Team Spirit	6	6	6	6	6	0‡	NC‡
2025	Super GT - GT500	TGR Team au TOM'S	8	2	0	1	4	80.5	**1st**
2025	Super Formula	Kondo Racing	12	0	1	0	1	27.5	11th
2025	Super Taikyu - ST-Q	GR Team Spirit	6	1	1	1	1	0‡	NC‡
2026	Super GT - GT500	TGR Team au TOM'S	8	2	0	0	2	62	**3rd**
2026	Super Formula	KCMG	10	0	0	0	0	5	19th*
2026	Super Taikyu - ST-Q	GR Team Spirit						0‡	NC‡
2026	SRO Japan Cup - GT3	Miracolo Tokyo	8	1	0	0	6	116	**3rd**

^{*} Season still in progress.

‡ Team standings.

=== Complete Formula Challenge Japan results ===
(key) (Races in bold indicate pole position) (Races in italics indicate fastest lap)

Year	Team	1	2	3	4	5	6	7	8	9	10	11	12	DC	Pts
2013	FTRS FCJ	FUJ; 1; 5	FUJ; 2; 3	MOT; 1; 1	MOT; 2; 6	FUJ; 1; 10	FUJ; 2; 3	FUJ; 3; 7	FUJ; 1; 7	FUJ; 2; 2	**SUZ**; **1**; 1	**SUZ**; **2**; 1	SUZ; 3; 1	1st	65

=== Complete Japanese Formula 3 Championship results ===
(key) (Races in bold indicate pole position) (Races in italics indicate fastest lap)

Year	Team	Engine	1	2	3	4	5	6	7	8	9	10	11	12	13	14	15	16	17	DC	Pts
2014	Petronas Team TOM'S	Toyota	SUZ; 1; 1	**SUZ**; **2**; 3	MOT; 1; 2	MOT; 2; 2	MOT; 3; 2	OKA; 1; 5	OKA; 2; 1	FUJ; 1; 2	FUJ; 2; 2	MOT; 1; 3	MOT; 2; 6	SUG; 1; 6	SUG; 2; 2	FUJ; 1; 3	FUJ; 2; 2			2nd	90
2015	Petronas Team TOM'S	Toyota	SUZ; 1 Ret	SUZ; 2; 3	**MOT**; **1**; 2	**MOT**; **2**; 1	MOT; 3; 1	OKA; 1; 8	**OKA**; **2**; 1	FUJ; 1; 1	FUJ; 2; 3	**OKA**; **1**; 2	**OKA**; **2**; 2	FUJ; 1; 5	FUJ; 2; 1	MOT; 1; 3	MOT; 2; 2	SUG; 1; 4	SUG; 2; 3	2nd	113
2016	Zent Team TOM'S	Toyota	**SUZ**; **1**; 1	**SUZ**; **2**; 1	FUJ; 1; 5	FUJ; 2; 2	OKA; 1; 1	OKA; 2; 6	**SUZ**; **1** Ret	**SUZ**; **2**; 2	FUJ; 1; 6	FUJ; 2; 4	MOT; 1; 5	MOT; 2; 2	**OKA**; **1**; 1	OKA; 2; 5	**SUG**; **1**; 1	**SUG**; **2**; 1	SUG; 3; 1	1st	113

=== Complete Super GT results ===
(key) (Races in bold indicate pole position) (Races in italics indicate fastest lap)

Year	Team	Car	Class	1	2	3	4	5	6	7	8	9	DC	Points
2015	Porsche Team KTR	Porsche 911 GT3	GT300	OKA; 14	FUJ; 12	CHA; 8	FUJ; Ret	SUZ; 18	SUG; 17	AUT; 8	MOT; 14		20th	6
2016	VivaC Team Tsuchiya	Toyota 86 MC	GT300	OKA	FUJ	SUG	FUJ	SUZ; 22	CHA	MOT	MOT		NC	0
2017	VivaC Team Tsuchiya	Toyota 86 MC	GT300	OKA; 4		**AUT**; 1	**SUG**; 3	FUJ; 29	**SUZ**; 18	CHA; 15	MOT; 5		5th	48
2017	Lexus Team WedsSport Bandoh	Lexus LC 500	GT500		FUJ; 10								20th	1
2018	Lexus Team WedsSport Bandoh	Lexus LC 500	GT500	OKA; 9	FUJ; 12	SUZ; 13	CHA; 3	FUJ; 10	SUG; Ret	AUT; 3	MOT; 5		11th	32
2019	Lexus Team LeMans Wako's	Lexus LC 500	GT500	OKA; 13	FUJ; 8	SUZ; 3	**CHA**; 1	FUJ; 1	AUT; 6	SUG; 6	MOT; 2		1st	85
2020	TGR Team SARD	Toyota GR Supra GT500	GT500	FUJ; 5	FUJ	SUZ	MOT	FUJ	SUZ				14th	27
2020	TGR Team KeePer Tom's	Toyota GR Supra GT500	GT500							MOT; 6	**FUJ**; 2		14th	27
2021	TGR Team ENEOS ROOKIE Racing	Toyota GR Supra GT500	GT500	OKA; 1	FUJ; 2	MOT; 13	SUZ; 12	SUG; 12†	AUT; 11	MOT; 6	**FUJ**; 3		5th	52
2022	TGR Team ENEOS ROOKIE Racing	Toyota GR Supra GT500	GT500	**OKA**; 1	FUJ; 7‡	SUZ; 8	FUJ; 7	SUZ; 14	SUG; 11	AUT; 4	MOT; 3		5th	49
2023	TGR Team ENEOS ROOKIE Racing	Toyota GR Supra GT500	GT500	OKA; 4	FUJ; 4	SUZ; 6	FUJ; 11	SUZ; 3	SUG; 6	AUT; 8	MOT; 6		7th	45
2024	TGR Team au TOM'S	Toyota GR Supra GT500	GT500	**OKA**; 1	FUJ; 4	SUZ; 5	FUJ; 7	SUG; 4	AUT; 7	MOT; 1	**SUZ**; 1		1st	97
2025	TGR Team au TOM'S	Toyota GR Supra GT500	GT500	OKA; 1	FUJ; 2	SEP; 7	FS1 (1)	FS2; 2	SUZ; 9	SUG; 9	AUT; 13†	MOT; 1	1st	80.5
2026	TGR Team au TOM'S	Toyota GR Supra GT500	GT500	OKA; 1	FUJ; 1	FUJ; 4	SUZ; 9	SUG; 4	AUT; 8	MOT; 10	MOT; 13		3rd	62

^{†} Driver did not finish the race, but was classified as he completed over 90% of the race distance.
^{‡} Half points awarded as less than 75% of race distance was completed.
^{(Number)} Driver did not take part in this sprint race, points are still awarded for the teammate's result.

=== Complete Super Formula results ===
(key) (Races in bold indicate pole position) (Races in italics indicate fastest lap)

Year	Team	Engine	1	2	3	4	5	6	7	8	9	10	11	12	DC	Points
2017	Kondo Racing	Toyota	SUZ; 14	OKA; 7	OKA; 6	FUJ; Ret	**MOT**; 6	AUT; 13	SUG; 11	SUZ; C	SUZ; C				11th	6.5
2018	Kondo Racing	Toyota	SUZ; 9	AUT; C	SUG; 8	FUJ; 18	MOT; 6	OKA; 6‡	SUZ; 3						9th	11.5
2019	Kondo Racing	Toyota	SUZ; 3	AUT; 7	SUG; 6	FUJ; 17	MOT; 13	OKA; 1	SUZ; 9						5th	21
2020	Kondo Racing	Toyota	MOT; 2^{3}	OKA	SUG; 6	AUT; 5	SUZ; 9	SUZ; 6	FUJ; 10						7th	34
2021	Kondo Racing	Toyota	FUJ; 12	SUZ; 12	AUT; 11	SUG; 14	MOT; 15	MOT; 8	SUZ; 6						14th	8
2022	Kondo Racing	Toyota	FUJ; 11	FUJ; 4	SUZ; 16^{2}	AUT; 12	SUG; Ret	FUJ; 7	MOT; 6	MOT; Ret	SUZ; 14	SUZ; 13			15th	19
2023	Kondo Racing	Toyota	FUJ; Ret	FUJ; 3	SUZ; 5	AUT; 4	SUG; 8	FUJ; 17	MOT; 9	SUZ; 11	SUZ; 9				8th	32
2024	Kondo Racing	Toyota	SUZ; 2	AUT; 7	SUG; 6‡	FUJ; 13	**MOT**; 2^{1}	FUJ; 10	FUJ; 8	SUZ; 8	SUZ; 9				7th	48.5
2025	Kondo Racing	Toyota	SUZ; 9	SUZ; 11	MOT; 7	**MOT**; 13^{1}	AUT; 3	FUJ; 12	FUJ; 8	SUG; 9	FUJ; 10	SUZ; 11	SUZ; 14	SUZ; 14	11th	27.5
2026	KCMG	Toyota	MOT; 13	MOT; 7	SUZ; Ret	SUZ; 16	FUJ; 14	FUJ; 13	FUJ; 10	SUG; 14	FUJ; 12	FUJ; Ret	SUZ	SUZ	19th*	5*

^{‡} Half points awarded as less than 75% of race distance was completed.
^{*} Season still in progress.

=== Complete FIA World Endurance Championship results ===
Year	Entrant	Class	Car	Engine	1	2	3	4	5	6	7	8	Rank	Points
2019–20	High Class Racing	LMP2	Oreca 07	Gibson GK428 4.2 L V8	SIL; 7	FUJ; 4	SHA; 6	BHR; 7	COA; 7	SPA; 7	LMS; Ret	BHR	13th	47

=== Complete 24 Hours of Le Mans results ===
Year	Team	Co-Drivers	Car	Class	Laps	Pos.	Class Pos.
2020	(Denmark) High Class Racing	(Denmark) Anders Fjordbach (United States) Mark Patterson	Oreca 07	LMP2	88	DNF	DNF

Sporting positions
Preceded by Nobuharu Matsushita	Formula Challenge Japan; Champion; 2013	Succeeded by None (Series ended)
Preceded by Nick Cassidy	Japanese Formula 3 Championship; Champion; 2016	Succeeded by Mitsunori Takaboshi
Preceded by Jenson Button; Naoki Yamamoto	Super GT; GT500 Champion; 2019; With: Kazuya Oshima	Succeeded by Naoki Yamamoto; Tadasuke Makino
Preceded by Sho Tsuboi; Ritomo Miyata	Super GT; GT500 Champion; 2024-2025; With: Sho Tsuboi	Succeeded by Naoki Yamamoto; Tadasuke Makino
