= Formula Challenge Japan =

Japanese racing series

- Category: Single seaters
- Country: Japan
- Inaugural season: 2006
- Folded: 2013
- Drivers: 18 (2013)
- Constructors: Tatuus
- Engine suppliers: Nismo (Renault)
- Tyre suppliers: Dunlop
- Last Drivers' champion: (Japan) Kenta Yamashita
- Official website: f-nippon.co.jp/fcj

Formula Challenge Japan was an open wheel racing series based in Japan. The first season was in 2006 and carried on from the defunct Formula Dream series. It is promoted as a young driver development project jointly by Honda, Toyota and Nissan and is positioned as an intermediate level of the domestic motorsport in Japan, lower than the All-Japan Formula Three Championship, but above F4.

Formula Challenge Japan ended after the 2013 season, and was replaced by Japan Formula 4 and later F4 Japanese Championship.

== Overview ==
Being backed by the three major automobile manufacturers in Japan, the driver of the series generally consists of the drivers graduating from the racing schools managed by those three, plus a number of privateers meeting the prerequisites.

To participate in the FCJ series, a driver needs to be younger than 26 years old and possess a National A racing license, but not having raced in Formula Three or above to participate, with a year's subscription fee of around 7.5 million yen. Despite being a series primarily catering the upcoming Japanese drivers, as of 2009 there were foreign drivers competing in the series.

The cars are open wheelers, running on a Tatuus chassis and is mated to a 2.0 L 200 hp engine and a six-speed sequential gearbox, similar to a Formula Renault 2.0 car. The engine is a Renault F4R unit badged as FCJ and maintained by Nismo. The tires are manufactured by Dunlop. To ensure parity of the cars, the engine and gearbox are both sealed prior to being delivered to the competitors so that no private tuning could be carried out in between. Moreover, the cars are centrally maintained by the organizers for this purpose.

As of 2009 the series is run on the same weekends as the Formula Nippon race weekend, and visits the major circuits in Japan like Fuji Speedway, Suzuka Circuit, Twin Ring Motegi and Sportsland Sugo.

== Scoring system ==
- Points were awarded to the top 10 race finishers with a bonus point for pole position and the fastest race lap.

Position	1st	2nd	3rd	4th	5th	6th	Pole	Fastest Lap
Points	10	7	6	3	2	1	1	1

== Champions ==
Season	Champion
2006	(Japan) Yuhi Sekiguchi
2007	(Japan) Keisuke Kunimoto
2008	(Japan) Yuji Kunimoto
2009	(Japan) Kazuki Miura
2010	(Japan) Yuichi Nakayama
2011	(Japan) Takamoto Katsuta
2012	(Japan) Nobuharu Matsushita
2013	(Japan) Kenta Yamashita

== Circuits ==
- (Japan) Suzuka Circuit (2006–2013)
- (Japan) Fuji Speedway (2006–2013)
- (Japan) Twin Ring Motegi (2006–2013)
- (Japan) Sportsland Sugo (2007–2009)

== See also ==
- Formula Nippon
- Formula Dream
