= Super Formula Championship =

Motorsport championship held in Japan

- Category: Open-wheel racing
- Country: Japan
- Inaugural season: 1973
- Drivers: 21
- Teams: 12
- Chassis suppliers: Dallara
- Engine manufacturers: Honda; Toyota
- Tire suppliers: Yokohama
- Drivers' champion: (Japan) Ayumu Iwasa
- Teams' champion: Docomo Team Dandelion Racing
- Official website: superformula.net

The Japanese Super Formula Championship (全日本スーパーフォーミュラ選手権) is a formula racing series held primarily in Japan. It is considered to be the pinnacle of single-seater racing in Japan or Asia as a whole, making it one of the top motorsport series in the region. The series is sanctioned by the Japan Automobile Federation (JAF) and managed by Japan Race Promotion (JRP). As of 2025, Super Formula is one of the fastest racing series in the world.

The first Japanese top formula championship was held in 1973 as the All-Japan Formula 2000 Championship. In 1978, the series transformed into the All-Japan Formula Two Championship, and again in 1987, into the All-Japan Formula 3000 Championship. For the most part, these Japanese racing series closely followed their European counterparts in terms of technical regulations. JRP was established in 1995, and began managing the series in 1996, under its new name, the Formula Nippon Championship. This began what is commonly known as the modern era of the series, which has seen it become more independent with regard to technical regulations. The series' name was changed again in 2013, to Super Formula (officially Japanese Championship Super Formula until 2016).

== History ==
=== Background ===
In Japan, touring and sports car racing was very popular throughout the 1960s. The Japanese Grand Prix was originally held as an event for touring and sports cars, and was immediately established as the largest motor racing event in the country during its original run between 1963 and 1969. On the other hand, formula car racing had a more difficult time being established in the nation's motorsport landscape. The inaugural JAF Grand Prix at Fuji Speedway in 1969 was Japan's first major single-seater race. And in 1971, the Japanese Grand Prix was reformatted into an event centered around formula car racing. Neither event managed to be as popular with spectators as the Japanese Grand Prix was during its time as a sports car race.

=== All-Japan Formula 2000 (1973–1977) ===
In 1973, the Japan Automobile Federation established the All-Japan Formula 2000 Championship as the first top-level formula racing series in Japan, to promote the sport of formula car racing in the country. The series was based on the European Formula Two Championship. But unlike European F2, which only allowed the use of racing engines based on mass production models, the JAF approved the use of purpose-built racing engines from manufacturers such as Mitsubishi Motors and BMW. Initially, cars built by British March Engineering dominated the series, but their local partners Nova Engineering developed their own car, inspired by the March. The Nova 02 was succeeded by the 512 and the 522. In 1977, Kojima Engineering entered the fray with their F1-based 008 design. Nonetheless the March racers remained competitive and filled most of the starting fields, with other teams also depending on cars from Surtees and Chevron.

Two lower-tier feeder series served to give young talent a start and to provide a broader base for formula racing in the country: FL500 (also known as FJ360) used kei car engines, while the larger FJ1300 class was close to European Formula Three racing.

=== All-Japan Formula Two (1978–1986) ===
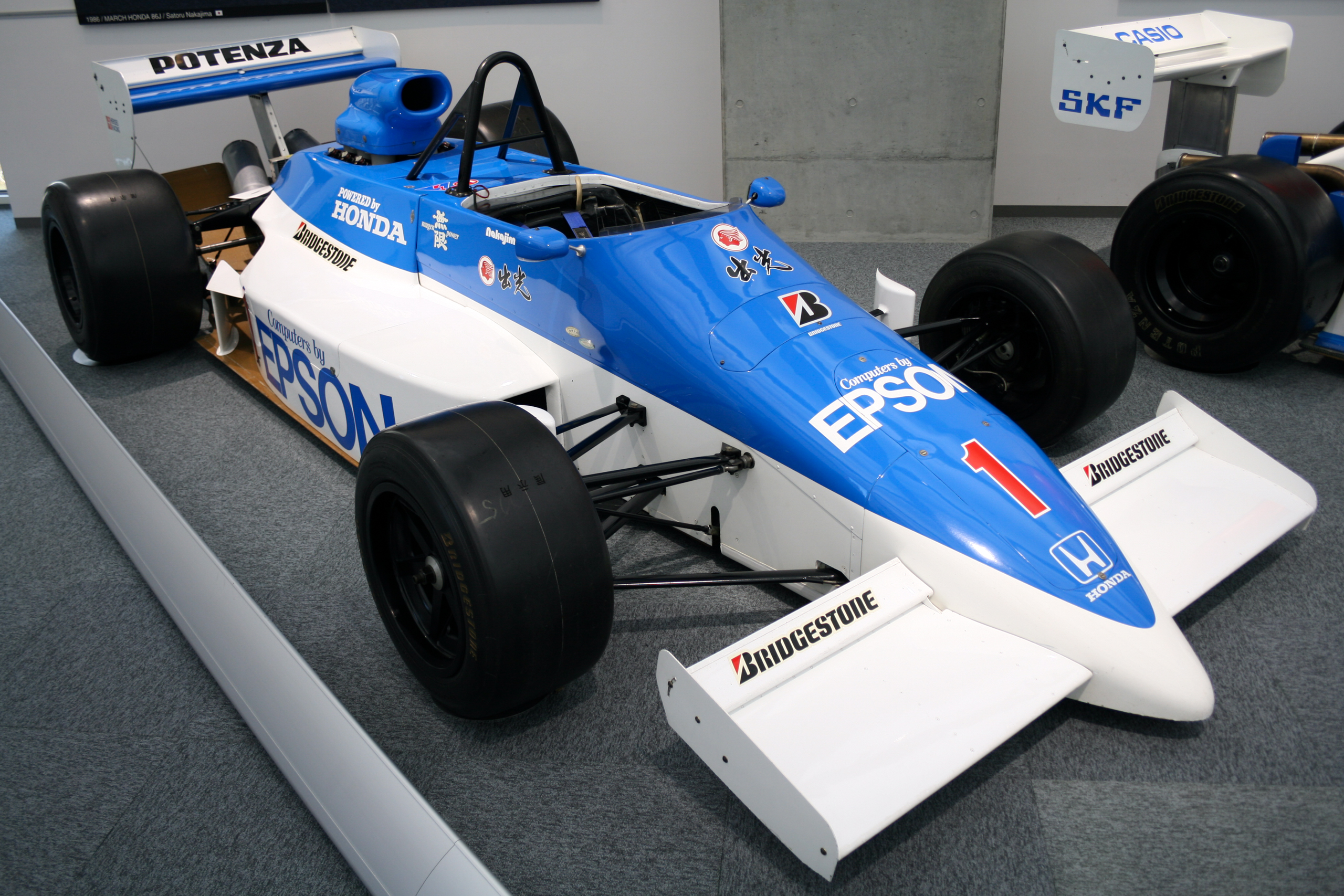
March 86J-Honda of Satoru Nakajima, the 1986 championship winner

In 1976, the FIA modified the Formula Two regulations to allow the use of purpose-built racing engines. With this change, the reasoning behind the name "Formula 2000" had disappeared, which led to the series being renamed the All-Japan Formula Two Championship from 1978.

These early years of formula racing in Japan were led by drivers such as Kunimitsu Takahashi, Kazuyoshi Hoshino, Masahiro Hasemi, Keiji Matsumoto, and Satoru Nakajima, who would go on to become the first Japanese driver to compete full-time in the Formula One World Championship. During the transition from Formula 2000 to Formula 2, a number of foreign drivers from the European F2 circuit began competing in and winning races in the Japanese series. 1981 European F2 champion Geoff Lees became the series' first non-Japanese champion when he won the All-Japan F2 title in 1983.

The Suzuka Formula Two Championship (established in 1977 as the Suzuka Formula 2000 Championship) was held concurrently at all events staged at Suzuka Circuit, to compete against the Fuji Grand Champion Series. During its existence from 1977 to 1986, it was considered to be of equal prestige to the All-Japan Formula 2 Championship.

==== 1987 championship ====
When European Formula Two ended in 1984, its Japanese counterpart did not follow suit immediately. The JAF considered starting a new Formula Two series from 1988. However, all entrants ran Formula 3000 cars in 1987. So, the 1987 Formula Two Championship was cancelled due to no entry of any cars for that format.

=== All-Japan Formula 3000 (1987–1995) ===
Switching to the open Formula 3000 standard in 1987, the All-Japan Formula 3000 Championship officially started in 1988.

During the late 1980s, a number of factors contributed to a surge in popularity for Japanese Top Formula racing. Honda-powered Formula One teams began winning multiple championships. The Japanese Grand Prix was reintroduced to the Formula One calendar in 1987, and that same year, Satoru Nakajima began competing full-time in F1. Fans began following the series through Fuji Television's broadcasts of Formula One, resulting in an increased interest in all forms of formula racing. Combined with the asset-driven bubble economy of the 1980s, the All-Japan Formula 3000 Championship attracted several entrants and investors.

Veteran drivers such as Hoshino, Hasemi, Takahashi, and Matsumoto were succeeded by a new generation of Japanese talents, led by 1988 champion Aguri Suzuki, and 1991 champion Ukyo Katayama – who would each go on to enjoy significant tenures in Formula One. The prosperous conditions within All-Japan F3000 also attracted many promising young drivers outside of Japan to compete in the series. Among those drivers included future Formula One Grand Prix winners Jean Alesi, Johnny Herbert, Eddie Irvine, and Heinz-Harald Frentzen. The most notable of these young drivers from outside Japan, however, was future seven-time Formula One World Champion Michael Schumacher, who made a one-off appearance at Sportsland Sugo in 1991.

The eventual burst of the bubble economy led to a decline in the series' popularity during the early to mid 1990s. Japanese and European regulations paralleled one another until 1996, when the International Formula 3000 series became a one-make format to lower costs.

=== Formula Nippon (1996–2012) ===
The previous Formula Nippon logo

In 1995, Japan Race Promotion (JRP) was established by Fuji Television, and became the new promoter and organising body of Japanese top formula racing, recognised by the JAF. As F3000 went down the path of a spec formula series abroad, the JRP opted to continue with the previous F3000 regulations which allowed for open chassis and engine competition. For 1996, the first full season under the management of JRP, the series changed its name to Formula Nippon.

Many of the top drivers in Formula Nippon continued to race in sports cars and touring cars as their predecessors had done in years past. Pedro de la Rosa became the first "double champion" of Japan in 1997 when he won both the Formula Nippon and All-Japan GT Championship GT500 titles in the same calendar year. Satoshi Motoyama and Richard Lyons would later accomplish the same feat in 2003 and 2004, respectively.

Drivers continued to use Formula Nippon as a stepping stone into Formula One including the aforementioned de la Rosa, Ralf Schumacher, Shinji Nakano, Toranosuke Takagi, and Ralph Firman. But by the late 2000s, Formula Nippon's status as a pathway into Formula One had diminished, and the series was greatly affected by the bankruptcy of Lehman Brothers (the term used in Japan to describe the 2008 financial crisis) - going from 20 cars in 2008 to 13 in 2009.

=== Super Formula (2013–present) ===
On 5 August 2012, the JRP announced that the series would change its name from Formula Nippon to Super Formula in 2013, stating a "desire to establish the series on an equal footing with the FIA Formula One World Championship and the IndyCar Series as the undisputed, standard-bearer top formula racing in Asia."

The series experienced renewed international interest when 2015 GP2 Series champion, Stoffel Vandoorne, entered full-time in 2016 with Docomo Team Dandelion Racing. Vandoorne would finish his season with two race victories before making the step up to F1 with McLaren in 2017. A year later, 2016 GP2 Series champion Pierre Gasly entered the series, bringing Red Bull sponsorship with him to Team Mugen. Gasly finished 2017 as the Rookie of the Year, with two wins, and finished runner-up in the standings by half a point.

Felix Rosenqvist, Álex Palou, and Patricio O'Ward later became IndyCar Series race winners after racing in Super Formula. Palou, who was the 2019 Rookie of the Year, went on to win the IndyCar Series championship in 2021, 2023, 2024, 2025, and 2026. Liam Lawson, the 2023 Super Formula series runner-up, drove in Formula One for AlphaTauri/RB Formula One Team for parts of the 2023 and 2024 seasons, and drove two races in 2025 for Red Bull Racing before moving back to Racing Bulls.

In 2023, Masahiko Kondo became the new Chairman of JRP, succeeding Satoru Nakajima. During Kondo's first season as chairman, Super Formula experienced a 64 percent increase in annual attendance from the previous season. Princess Yōko of Mikasa was named as the special honorary president of JRP in 2025, and the Princess Yōko Cup was given to the series champion.

== Scoring system ==
In 2020, Super Formula adopted a new top-ten scoring system similar to the one used in Super GT, awarding 20 points to the race winner. Bonus points were given to the top three qualifiers in every round; three points for pole position, two for second place, and one for third place.

A top-six points system was used in All-Japan F3000 and Formula Nippon from 1988 to 2006, inspired by the contemporary Formula One points system. Beginning in 2007, the series followed Formula One once again and paid out points to the top eight finishers. A bonus point was awarded to the polesitter starting in 2008, during which the regular points system was changed again to award the top ten finishers and give 15 points to the race winner in standard events. The points system reverted back to a top-eight format from 2009–2019, though some rounds would have special points payouts.

Race points (2020–present)

Position	1st	2nd	3rd	4th	5th	6th	7th	8th	9th	10th
Points	20	15	11	8	6	5	4	3	2	1

Qualifying points (2020–present)

Position	1st	2nd	3rd
Points	3	2	1

== Car specifications ==
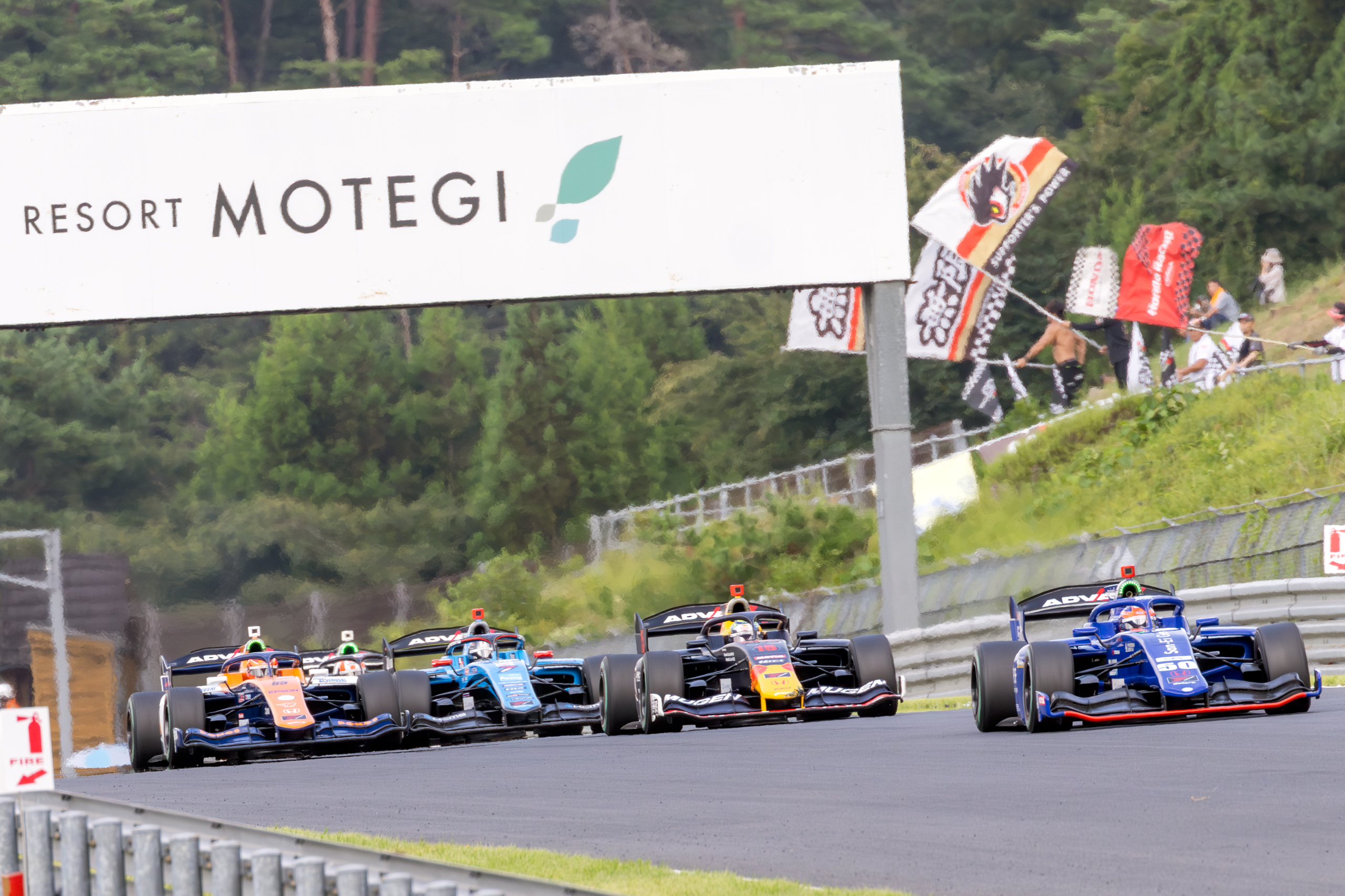
Start of a Super Formula race at the 2024 Motegi round.

=== Cars ===
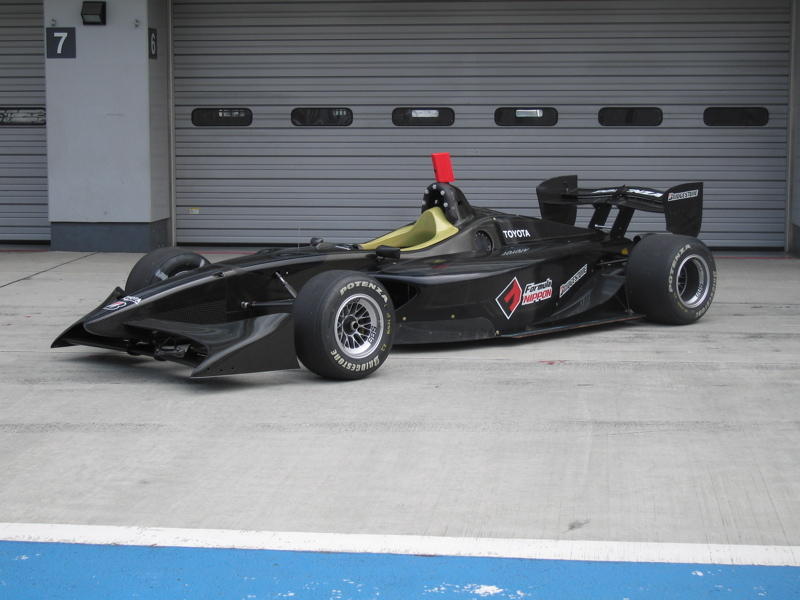
The Swift FN09 (also known as the Swift 017.n), was introduced in the 2009 season and raced until the end of the 2013 season.

Until 2002, Formula Nippon was an open formula category, where a variety of chassis builders, engine manufacturers, and tyre manufacturers could compete. Chassis were supplied by Lola, Reynard, and G-Force. Mugen-Honda supplied the vast majority of the engines along with Cosworth and Judd. Bridgestone, Yokohama, and Dunlop supplied teams with tyres. However, the series began adopting more spec components. Bridgestone became the series' sole tyre supplier beginning in 1997, and in 1998, Mugen-Honda became the sole engine supplier (though open tuning was still allowed). Chassis remained an open formula until 2003, after Reynard declared bankruptcy and G-Force withdrew from the series. The Lola B03/51 became the series' spec chassis thereafter.

In 2006, Formula Nippon underwent a drastic revision of its technical regulations. The new Lola FN06 chassis was introduced, while new 3.0-litre V8 engines by Toyota and Honda were introduced, based on the same engine blocks that the manufacturers used in the 2005 IndyCar Series. American racecar manufacturer Swift Engineering produced the Swift FN09 chassis that was introduced in 2009, and used until 2013. Also, in 2009, a new 3.4-litre V8 engine formula was introduced, a common engine that would be used in Formula Nippon and the GT500 class of Super GT, as well as a "push-to-pass" overtake system that is still used today.

The Dallara SF14 was used between the 2014 to 2018 season. It featured new 2.0-litre single turbocharged engines built by Honda and Toyota under the Nippon Race Engine (NRE) formula and featured at least 30% components manufactured in Japan.

Regulation changes in 2014, both in Super Formula and Formula 1, resulted in the closest gap ever between lap times: In the first round of the 2014 season at Suzuka Circuit, André Lotterer set a lap time of 1:36.996 in Q2, which was 4.49 seconds slower than Nico Rosberg's pole time of 1:32.506 for the 2014 Japanese Grand Prix; Lotterer's time was not only inside the 107% rule, but would have put him 21st on the F1 grid in front of the Caterham of Kamui Kobayashi (1:37.015) and the Marussia of Max Chilton (1:37.481).

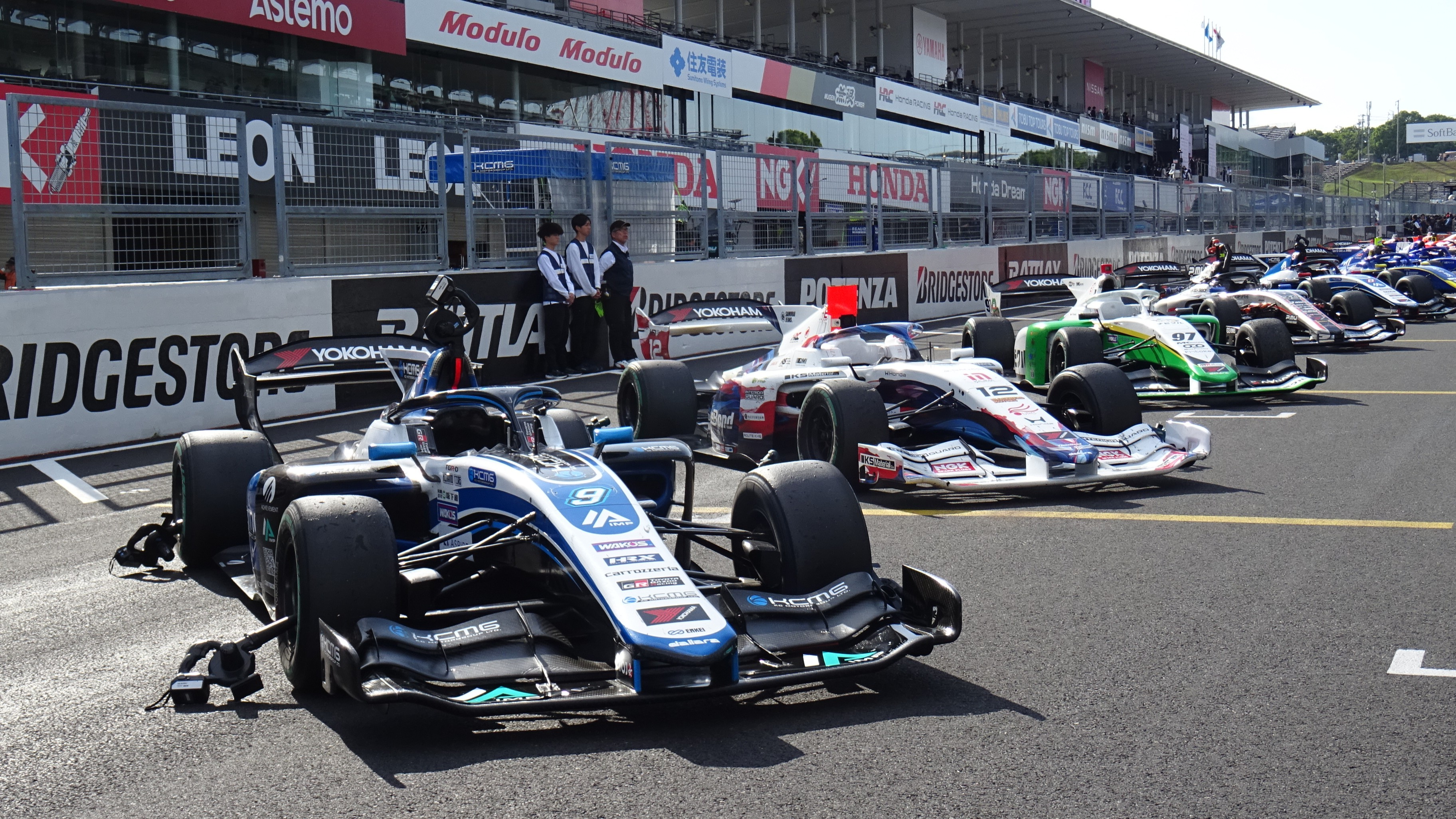
Dallara SF23 cars together at Suzuka in 2026

In 2016, Yokohama Rubber replaced Bridgestone as the series' sole tyre supplier.

The Dallara SF19, which was used from the 2019 to 2022 season, was unveiled at Suzuka Circuit in October 2017. It weighed 670 kilograms (including the driver) and featured a halo crash protection system. The Dallara SF23, a slightly modified version of the SF19, was unveiled on December 13, 2022, and has been used since the 2023 season. It has upgraded aerodynamics to improve overtaking and wheel-to-wheel racing.

The engines used in Super Formula have been detuned compared to their counterparts used in Super GT's GT500 class, but continue to allow for the use of the "push-to-pass" style Overtaking System (OTS) that allows for an additional five kilogrammes per hour (5 kg/h) of fuel burn for up to 200 seconds during a race.

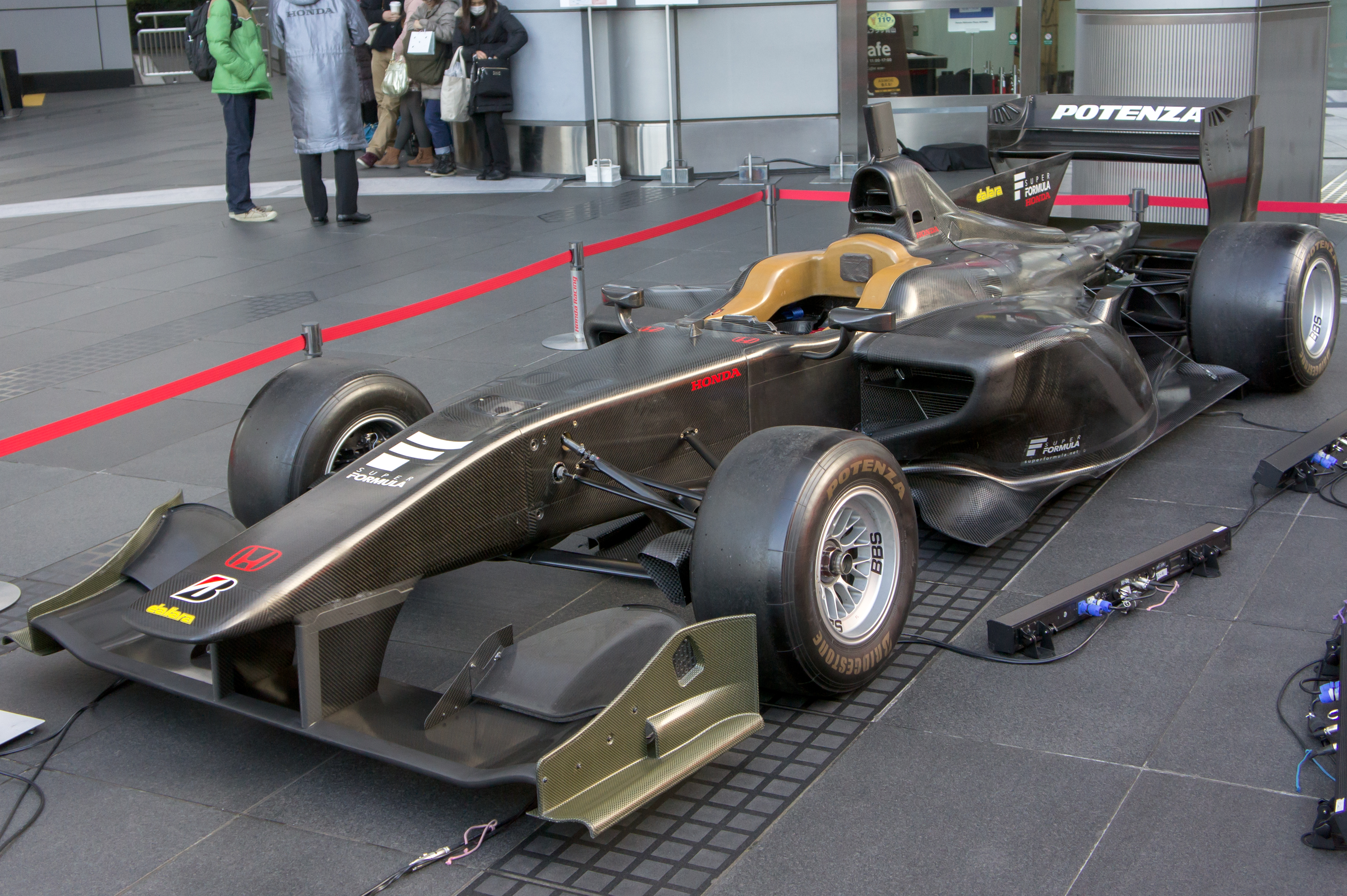
The Dallara SF14, which raced from 2014 to 2018.

==== Dallara SF14 Specifications (2014–2018) ====
- Engine displacement: 2.0 L (122 cu in) DOHC inline-4
- Gearbox: 6-speed paddle shift gearbox
- Weight: 660 kg (1,455 lb)
- Power output: 543 hp (405 kW)
- Fuel: 102 RON unleaded gasoline
- Fuel delivery: Direct fuel injection
- Aspiration: Single-turbocharged
- Length: 5,268 mm (207 in)
- Width: 1,900 mm (75 in)
- Wheelbase: 3,165 mm (125 in)
- Steering: Electric power-assisted rack and pinion
- Tires: Bridgestone Potenza (2014–2015) or Yokohama ADVAN (2016–2018) radial dry slicks and treaded rain tyres

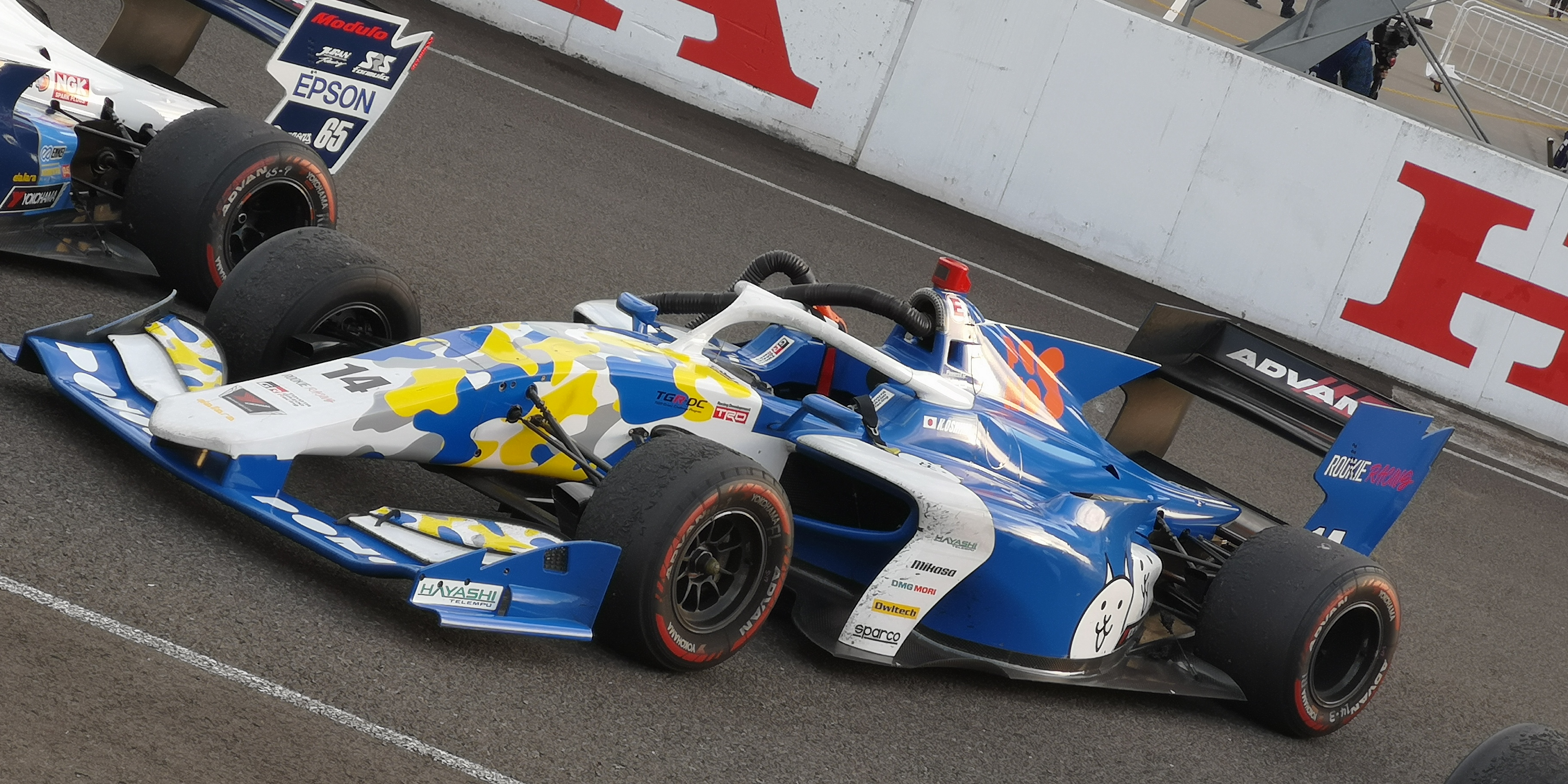
The Dallara SF19, which raced from 2019 to 2022.

==== Dallara SF19 Specifications (2019–2022) ====
- Engine displacement: 2.0 L (122 cu in) DOHC inline-4
- Gearbox: 6-speed paddle shift gearbox
- Weight: 670 kg (1,477 lb)
- Power output: 543 hp (405 kW)
- Fuel: 102 RON unleaded gasoline
- Fuel delivery: Direct fuel injection
- Aspiration: Single-turbocharged
- Length: 5,233 mm (206 in)
- Width: 1,910 mm (75 in)
- Wheelbase: 3,115 mm (123 in)
- Steering: Electric power-assisted rack and pinion
- Tires: Yokohama ADVAN radial dry slicks and treaded rain tires

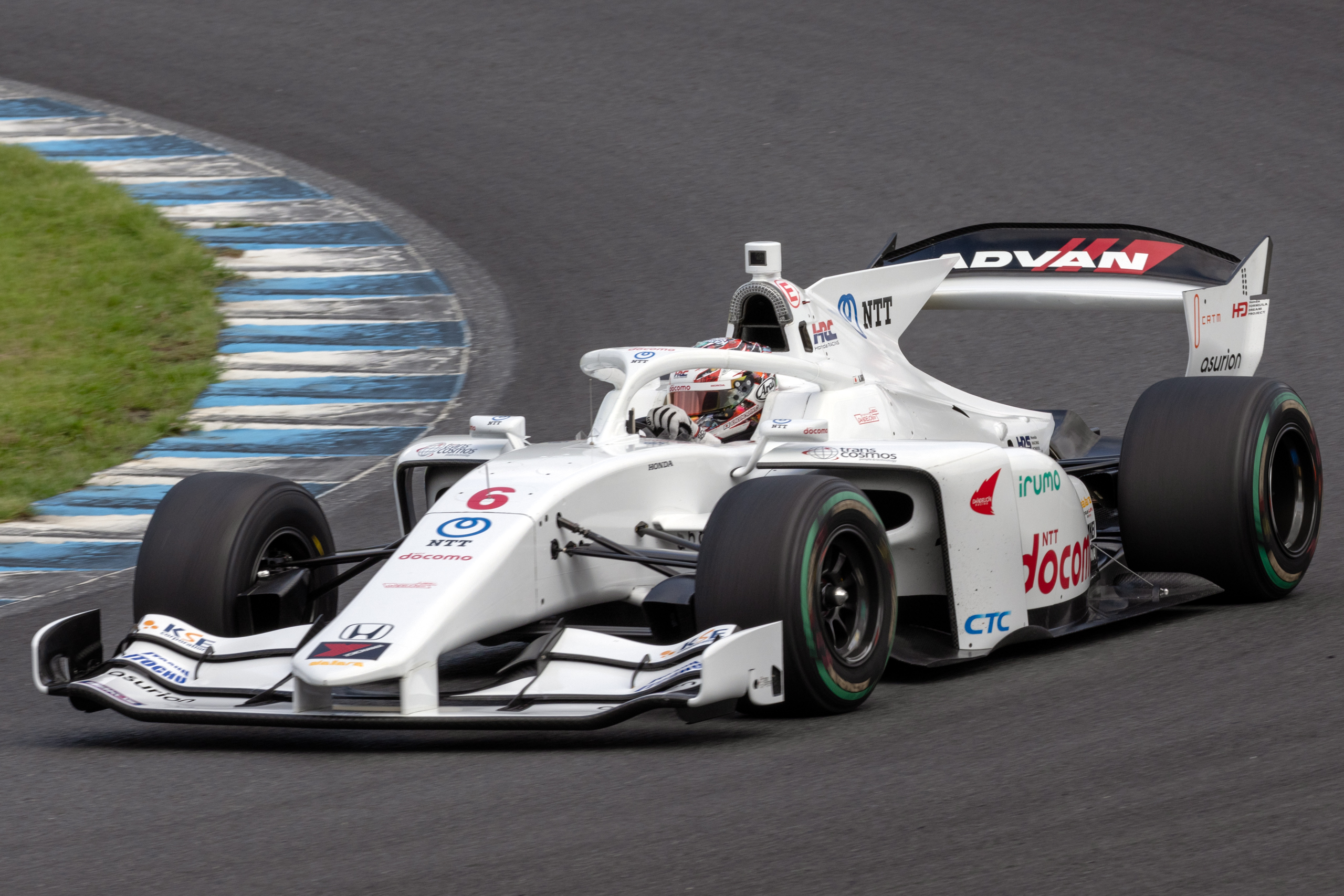
The current Dallara SF23 chassis, introduced in 2023.

==== Dallara SF23 Specifications (2023–present) ====
- Engine displacement: 2.0 L (122 cu in) DOHC inline-4
- Gearbox: 6-speed paddle shift gearbox
- Weight: 677 kg (1,493 lb)
- Power output: 550 hp (410 kW)
- Fuel: 102 RON unleaded gasoline
- Fuel delivery: Direct fuel injection
- Aspiration: Single-turbocharged
- Length: 5,235 mm (206 in)
- Width: 1,910 mm (75 in)
- Steering: Electric power-assisted rack and pinion
- Tires: Yokohama ADVAN radial dry slicks and treaded rain tires

== Drivers ==
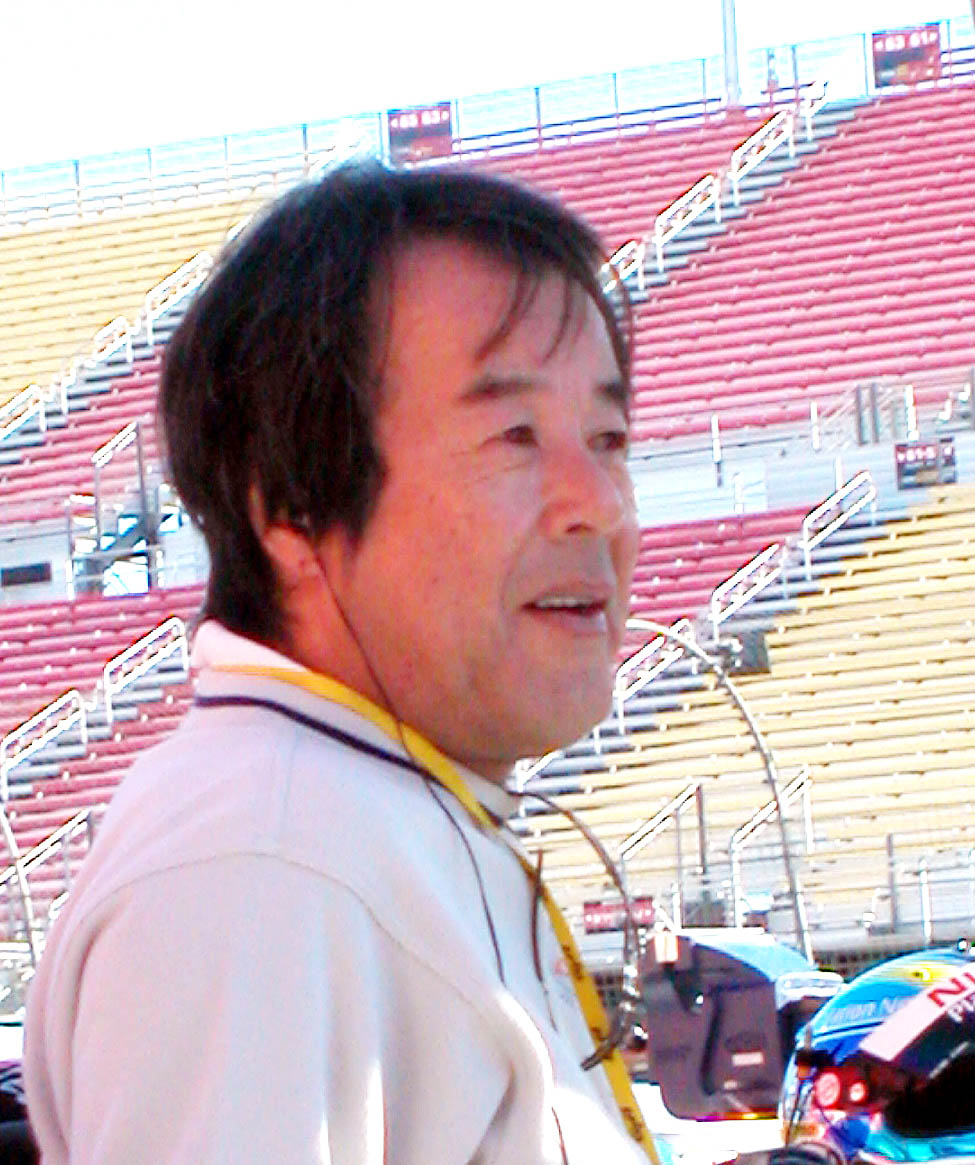
Kazuyoshi Hoshino won six Japanese top formula championships in F2000, F2, and F3000.

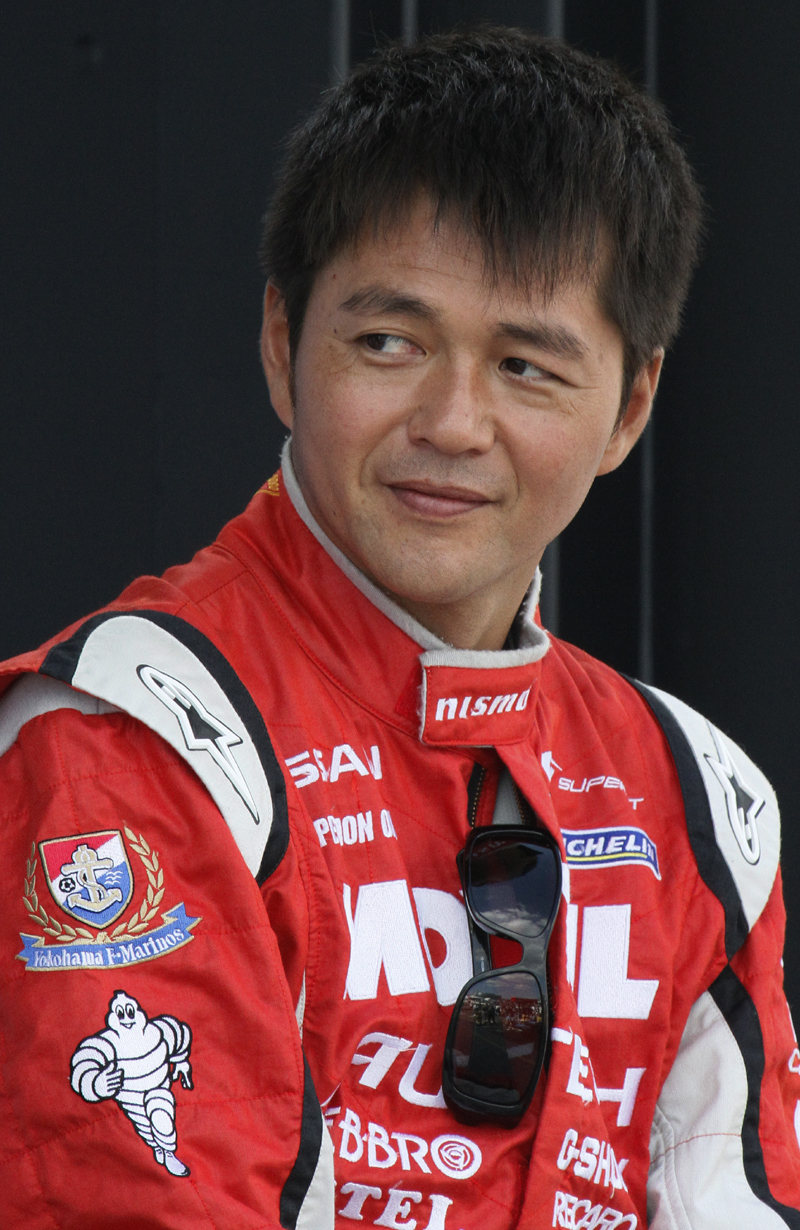
Satoshi Motoyama won four Formula Nippon championships, the most since the establishment of the JRP in 1996.

In terms of drivers, Super Formula is a high-level series where the field is composed mainly of professional factory drivers who are paid to race. It is unanimously regarded as the highest level of formula racing in Japan and Asia, and although opinions on its exact global position vary, it is generally considered to be a higher level series than Formula 2, but slightly below IndyCar and to a larger extent Formula One.

Super Formula is a top-level national series and not a feeder or junior category, as there is no series directly above it and many professional drivers compete in it until they retire. Some drivers, mostly foreign, have used it as a platform to prove their ability in an attempt to move to Formula One or elsewhere.

The bulk of the grid consists of Japanese drivers, most of whom have the goal of forging successful long-term careers in the series. Foreign drivers have always been regular participants in the series, and there have been several drivers to come from a Japanese Top Formula drive to a prominent Formula One role; the best-known of these include Michael Schumacher, Eddie Irvine, Ralf Schumacher, Pedro de la Rosa, Stoffel Vandoorne, Pierre Gasly, and Liam Lawson.

Conversely, several foreign drivers have built long careers in Japan; examples of such drivers include André Lotterer, Benoît Tréluyer, Loïc Duval, and João Paulo de Oliveira. Most drivers in the series are contracted to either Honda or Toyota – the series' two engine manufacturers since 2006 – for whom they also typically compete in the Super GT sports car series, Japan's other top motorsport category.

=== Feeder series ===
The primary feeder series for Super Formula is Super Formula Lights, which was known as the Japanese Formula 3 Championship prior to 2020. The Formula Regional Japanese Championship and F4 Japanese Championship sit below Super Formula Lights in the Japanese single-seater pyramid.

Honda Performance Development (now Honda Racing Corporation US) offered a US$600,000 annual scholarship to the winner of the Formula Regional Americas Championship towards a Honda-powered seat in Super Formula beginning in 2021. 2022 series champion Raoul Hyman was the only driver to accept the scholarship before it was discontinued when Ligier replaced Honda as the engine supplier of F4 and FR in the United States.

== Circuits ==
Super Formula races are traditionally held at the six major national racing circuits in Japan. Suzuka Circuit, the traditional home of the Formula One Japanese Grand Prix, has staged more rounds than any other venue and has been on the calendar every year since the formation of the series in 1973. Suzuka typically hosts two rounds per season: The JAF Suzuka Grand Prix, Japan's oldest national formula racing event, is typically held at the end of the season in the autumn. Until 2025, the Suzuka 2&4 Race, a joint event staged with the All-Japan Road Race Championship, was typically held in the spring.

Fuji Speedway did not host any racing in 2004 while the circuit underwent a wholesale renovation, but otherwise, it has been part of the calendar in almost every Super Formula season, including the very first season of the All-Japan F2000 Championship in 1973. Mobility Resort Motegi (known as Twin Ring Motegi until 2022) opened in 1997 and has been part of the calendar every year since. Likewise, Sportsland Sugo has been on the calendar every year since its current configuration was opened in 1987.

Miné Circuit (formerly Nishinihon Circuit) was a regular fixture of the calendar until it closed for spectator events after the 2005 season. Autopolis, in Kyushu, and Okayama International Circuit, in the Chūgoku region, have since replaced Miné as the westernmost venues that Super Formula visits, though as of 2021 the series no longer races at Okayama. Tokachi International Speedway in Hokkaido briefly hosted the series from 1995 to 1996.

Sepang International Circuit in Malaysia hosted the first and only championship round outside of Japan when it was part of the 2004 calendar. The series planned to race at Inje Speedium in South Korea during the 2013 season and again in 2025, but both events were cancelled.

=== Circuits used ===
- **Bold** denotes a circuit used in the 2025 Super Formula season.
- Italic denotes a formerly used circuit.

Number	Circuit	Years	Total Races
1	**Suzuka Circuit**	Grand Prix Circuit: 1973–present East Circuit: 1999; East Special Circuit: 2000–2002 (Note: A modified version of the East Circuit which turns right at the end of Dunlop Corner and exits halfway between 130R and the Chicane.)	182
2	**Fuji Speedway**	1973, 1975–1979, 1982–2003, 2005–present	99
3	**Mobility Resort Motegi**	1997–present	48
4	**Sportsland Sugo**	1987–present	40
5	Miné Circuit	1977–1980, 1982–2005	35
6	**Autopolis**	1991–1992, 2006, 2009–2015, 2017–present	18
7	Okayama International Circuit	2007–2008, 2015–2020	11
8	Tokachi International Speedway	1995–1996	2
9	Sepang Circuit	2004	1

== Champions ==
Season	Drivers' Champion					Team Champion	Rookie of the Year
Season	Driver	Team	Chassis*	Engine*	Tyre*	Team Champion	Rookie of the Year
All-Japan Formula 2000 Championship (1973–1977)
1973	(Japan) Motoharu Kurosawa	Heros Racing	March 722	BMW M12/6	B	Not awarded	Not awarded
1974	(Japan) Noritake Takahara	Takahara Racing	March 742	BMW M12/6	B	Not awarded	Not awarded
1975	(Japan) Kazuyoshi Hoshino	Victory Circle Club	March 742	BMW M12/6	B	Not awarded	Not awarded
1976	(Japan) Noritake Takahara	Stanley Takahara	Nova 512	BMW M12/7	B	Not awarded	Not awarded
1977	(Japan) Kazuyoshi Hoshino	Heros Racing	Nova 512B; Nova 532P	BMW M12/7	B	Not awarded	Not awarded
All-Japan Formula Two Championship (1978–1986)
1978	(Japan) Kazuyoshi Hoshino	Heros Racing	Nova 532P; Nova 522	BMW M12/7	B	Not awarded	Not awarded
1979	(Japan) Keiji Matsumoto	Diatone Racing	March 782; March 792	BMW M12/7	D	Not awarded	Not awarded
1980	(Japan) Masahiro Hasemi	Tomica Racing Team	March 802	BMW M12/7	B	Not awarded	Not awarded
1981	(Japan) Satoru Nakajima	i&i Racing	Ralt RH6/80; March 812	Honda RA261E	B	Not awarded	Not awarded
1982	(Japan) Satoru Nakajima	John Player Special Team Ikuzawa	March 812; March 822	Honda RA262E	B	Not awarded	Not awarded
1983	(United Kingdom) Geoff Lees	John Player Special Team Ikuzawa	Spirit 201; March 832	Honda RA263E	D	Not awarded	Not awarded
1984	(Japan) Satoru Nakajima	Heros Racing	March 842	Honda RA264E	B	Not awarded	Not awarded
1985	(Japan) Satoru Nakajima	Heros Racing with Nakajima	March 85J	Honda RA264E; Honda RA265E	B	Not awarded	Not awarded
1986	(Japan) Satoru Nakajima	Heros Racing with Nakajima	March 86J	Honda RA266E	B	Not awarded	Not awarded
All-Japan Formula 3000 Championship (1987–1995)
1987	(Japan) Kazuyoshi Hoshino	Hoshino Racing	March 87B; Lola T87/50	Honda RA387E	B	Not awarded	Not awarded
1988	(Japan) Aguri Suzuki	Footwork Sports Racing Team	March 87B; Reynard 88D	Yamaha OX77	B	Not awarded	Not awarded
1989	(Japan) Hitoshi Ogawa	Auto Beaurex Motor Sport	Lola T88/50; Lola T89/50	Mugen MF308	D	Not awarded	Not awarded
1990	(Japan) Kazuyoshi Hoshino	Cabin Racing Team with Impul	Lola T90/50	Mugen MF308	B	Not awarded	Not awarded
1991	(Japan) Ukyo Katayama	Cabin Racing Team with Heros	Lola T90/50; Lola T91/50	Cosworth DFV	B	Not awarded	Not awarded
1992	(Italy) Mauro Martini	Acom Evolution Team Nova	Lola T91/50; Lola T92/50	Mugen MF308	B	Not awarded	Not awarded
1993	(Japan) Kazuyoshi Hoshino	Nisseki Impul Racing Team	Lola T92/50	Cosworth DFV	B	Not awarded	Not awarded
1994	(Italy) Marco Apicella	Dome	Dome F104	Mugen MF308	D	Not awarded	Not awarded
1995	(Japan) Toshio Suzuki	Hoshino Racing	Lola T94/50	Mugen MF308	B	Not awarded	Not awarded
Japanese Championship Formula Nippon (1996–2012)
1996	(Germany) Ralf Schumacher	X Japan Racing Team LeMans	Reynard 96D	Mugen MF308	B	X Japan Racing Team LeMans	Not awarded
1997	(Spain) Pedro de la Rosa	Shionogi Team Nova	Lola T97/51	Mugen MF308	(B)	Shionogi Team Nova	Not awarded
1998	(Japan) Satoshi Motoyama	LEMONed Racing Team LeMans	Reynard 97D	(Mugen MF308)	(B)	LEMONed Racing Team LeMans	Not awarded
1999	(Netherlands) Tom Coronel	PIAA Nakajima Racing	Reynard 99L	(Mugen MF308)	(B)	PIAA Nakajima Racing	Not awarded
2000	(Japan) Toranosuke Takagi	PIAA Nakajima Racing	Reynard 2KL	(Mugen MF308)	(B)	PIAA Nakajima Racing	Not awarded
2001	(Japan) Satoshi Motoyama	Team Impul	Reynard 99L	(Mugen MF308)	(B)	Team 5ZIGEN	Not awarded
2002	(Republic of Ireland) Ralph Firman	PIAA Nakajima Racing	Reynard 01L	(Mugen MF308)	(B)	PIAA Nakajima Racing	Not awarded
2003	(Japan) Satoshi Motoyama	Team Impul	(Lola B03/51)	(Mugen MF308)	(B)	Team Impul	Not awarded
2004	(United Kingdom) Richard Lyons	DoCoMo Team Dandelion Racing	(Lola B03/51)	(Mugen MF308)	(B)	Team Impul	Not awarded
2005	(Japan) Satoshi Motoyama	Mobilecast Team Impul arting Racing Team with Impul	(Lola B03/51)	(Mugen MF308)	(B)	Mobilecast Team Impul arting Racing Team with Impul	Not awarded
2006	(France) Benoît Tréluyer	Mobilecast Team Impul	(Lola B06/51 (FN06))	Toyota RV8J	(B)	Mobilecast Team Impul	Not awarded
2007	(Japan) Tsugio Matsuda	Mobilecast Team Impul	(Lola B06/51 (FN06))	Toyota RV8J	(B)	Mobilecast Team Impul	Not awarded
2008	(Japan) Tsugio Matsuda	Lawson Team Impul	(Lola B06/51 (FN06))	Toyota RV8J	(B)	Lawson Team Impul	(Japan) Kohei Hirate
2009	(France) Loïc Duval	Nakajima Racing	(Swift 017.n (FN09))	Honda HR09E	(B)	Nakajima Racing	(Japan) Koudai Tsukakoshi
2010	(Brazil) João Paulo de Oliveira	Mobil 1 Team Impul	(Swift 017.n (FN09))	Toyota RV8K	(B)	Mobil 1 Team Impul	(Japan) Naoki Yamamoto
2011	(Germany) André Lotterer	Petronas Team TOM'S	(Swift 017.n (FN09))	Toyota RV8K	(B)	Petronas Team TOM'S	(Japan) Kazuki Nakajima
2012	(Japan) Kazuki Nakajima	Petronas Team TOM'S	(Swift 017.n (FN09))	Toyota RV8K	(B)	Docomo Team Dandelion Racing	Not awarded
Japanese Super Formula Championship (2013–present)
2013	(Japan) Naoki Yamamoto	Team Mugen	(Swift 017.n (SF13))	Honda HR12E	(B)	Petronas Team TOM'S	Not awarded
2014	(Japan) Kazuki Nakajima	Petronas Team TOM'S	(Dallara SF14)	Toyota RI4A	(B)	Petronas Team TOM'S	(Japan) Tomoki Nojiri
2015	(Japan) Hiroaki Ishiura	P.mu/Cerumo・INGING	(Dallara SF14)	Toyota RI4A	(B)	Petronas Team TOM'S	(Japan) Kamui Kobayashi
2016	(Japan) Yuji Kunimoto	P.mu/Cerumo・INGING	(Dallara SF14)	Toyota RI4A	(Y)	P.mu/Cerumo・INGING	Not awarded
2017	(Japan) Hiroaki Ishiura	P.mu/Cerumo・INGING	(Dallara SF14)	Toyota RI4A	(Y)	P.mu/Cerumo・INGING	(France) Pierre Gasly
2018	(Japan) Naoki Yamamoto	Team Mugen	(Dallara SF14)	Honda HR-417E	(Y)	Kondo Racing	(Japan) Nobuharu Matsushita
2019	(New Zealand) Nick Cassidy	Vantelin Team TOM'S	(Dallara SF19)	Toyota Biz-01F	(Y)	Docomo Team Dandelion Racing	(Spain) Álex Palou
2020	(Japan) Naoki Yamamoto	Docomo Team Dandelion Racing	(Dallara SF19)	Honda HR-417E	(Y)	Vantelin Team TOM'S	(Japan) Toshiki Oyu
2021	(Japan) Tomoki Nojiri	Team Mugen	(Dallara SF19)	Honda HR-417E	(Y)	carenex Team Impul	(Japan) Hiroki Otsu
2022	(Japan) Tomoki Nojiri	Team Mugen	(Dallara SF19)	Honda HR-417E	(Y)	Team Mugen	(Japan) Ren Sato
2023	(Japan) Ritomo Miyata	Vantelin Team TOM'S	(Dallara SF23)	Toyota TRD-01F	(Y)	Team Mugen	(New Zealand) Liam Lawson
2024	(Japan) Sho Tsuboi	Vantelin Team TOM'S	(Dallara SF23)	Toyota TRD-01F	(Y)	Docomo Team Dandelion Racing	(Japan) Ayumu Iwasa
2025	(Japan) Ayumu Iwasa	Team Mugen	(Dallara SF23)	Honda HR-417E	(Y)	Docomo Team Dandelion Racing	(Brazil) Igor Omura Fraga

* The ( ) indicates the tyre (since 1997), chassis (since 2003), or engine (1998–2005) was a spec part that all competitors used for that season.

== Statistics ==
Indicates active driver, team, and manufacturer.

=== Championships ===
==== By driver ====
Driver	Total	Seasons
(Japan) Kazuyoshi Hoshino	6	1975, 1977, 1978, 1987, 1990, 1993
(Japan) Satoru Nakajima	5	1981, 1982, 1984, 1985, 1986
(Japan) Satoshi Motoyama	4	1998, 2001, 2003, 2005
(Japan) Naoki Yamamoto	3	2013, 2018, 2020
(Japan) Noritake Takahara	2	1974, 1976
(Japan) Tsugio Matsuda	2	2007, 2008
(Japan) Kazuki Nakajima	2	2012, 2014
(Japan) Hiroaki Ishiura	2	2015, 2017
(Japan) Tomoki Nojiri	2	2021, 2022
(Japan) Motoharu Kurosawa	1	1973
(Japan) Keiji Matsumoto	1	1979
(Japan) Masahiro Hasemi	1	1980
(United Kingdom) Geoff Lees	1	1983
(Japan) Aguri Suzuki	1	1988
(Japan) Hitoshi Ogawa	1	1989
(Japan) Ukyo Katayama	1	1991
(Italy) Mauro Martini	1	1992
(Italy) Marco Apicella	1	1994
(Japan) Toshio Suzuki	1	1995
(Germany) Ralf Schumacher	1	1996
(Spain) Pedro de la Rosa	1	1997
(Netherlands) Tom Coronel	1	1999
(Japan) Toranosuke Takagi	1	2000
(Republic of Ireland) Ralph Firman	1	2002
(United Kingdom) Richard Lyons	1	2004
(France) Benoît Tréluyer	1	2006
(France) Loïc Duval	1	2009
(Brazil) João Paulo de Oliveira	1	2010
(Germany) André Lotterer	1	2011
(Japan) Yuji Kunimoto	1	2016
(New Zealand) Nick Cassidy	1	2019
(Japan) Ritomo Miyata	1	2023
(Japan) Sho Tsuboi	1	2024
(Japan) Ayumu Iwasa	1	2025

==== By team ====
Team	Total	Drivers' titles	Teams' titles
(Japan) Team Impul	19	11 (1987, 1990, 1993, 1995, 2001, 2003, 2005, 2006, 2007, 2008, 2010)	8 (2003, 2004, 2005, 2006, 2007, 2008, 2010, 2021)
(Japan) Team TOM'S	11	6 (2011, 2012, 2014, 2019, 2023, 2024)	5 (2011, 2013, 2014, 2015, 2020)
(Japan) Nakajima Racing	8	4 (1999, 2000, 2002, 2009)	4 (1999, 2000, 2002, 2009)
(Japan) Team Mugen	7	5 (2013, 2018, 2021, 2022, 2025)	2 (2022, 2023)
(Japan) Dandelion Racing	6	2 (2004, 2020)	4 (2012, 2019, 2024, 2025)
(Japan) Team LeMans	5	3 (1979, 1996, 1998)	2 (1996, 1998)
(Japan) Cerumo・Inging	5	3 (2015, 2016, 2017)	2 (2016, 2017)
(Japan) Heroes Racing	4	4 (1973, 1977, 1978, 1991)	0
(Japan) Team Ikuzawa	3	3 (1981, 1982, 1983)	0
(Japan) Heroes Racing with Nakajima	3	3 (1984, 1985, 1986)	0
(Japan) Nova Engineering	3	2 (1992, 1997)	1 (1997)
(Japan) Takahara Racing	2	2 (1974, 1976)	0
(Japan) Victory Circle Club	1	1 (1975)	0
(Japan) Tomica Racing Team	1	1 (1980)	0
(Japan) Mooncraft	1	1 (1988)	0
(Japan) Stellar International	1	1 (1989)	0
(Japan) Dome	1	1 (1994)	0
(Japan) Team 5ZIGEN	1	0	1 (2001)
(Japan) Kondo Racing	1	0	1 (2018)

=== Wins ===
After the twelfth round of the 2026 season.

==== By driver ====
Rank	Driver	Total wins	All Japan F2000	All Japan F2	All Japan F3000	Formula Nippon	Super Formula
1	(Japan) Kazuyoshi Hoshino	39	7	12	19	1	0
2	(Japan) Satoshi Motoyama	27	0	0	0	27	0
3	(Germany) André Lotterer	24	0	0	0	16	8
4	(Japan) Satoru Nakajima	21	0	21	0	0	0
5	(Japan) Toranosuke Takagi	14	0	0	3	11	0
5	(Japan) Tomoki Nojiri	14	0	0	0	0	14
7	(France) Loïc Duval	12	0	0	0	10	2
8	(Japan) Keiji Matsumoto	11	0	9	2	0	0
8	(France) Benoît Tréluyer	11	0	0	0	11	0
10	(United States) Ross Cheever	10	0	0	10	0	0
10	(Brazil) João Paulo de Oliveira	10	0	0	0	5	5
10	(Japan) Kakunoshin Ohta	10	0	0	0	0	10
13	(Japan) Masahiro Hasemi	9	4	4	1	0	0
13	(Japan) Kazuki Nakajima	9	0	0	0	3	6
13	(Japan) Naoki Yamamoto	9	0	0	0	0	9
16	(Japan) Naoki Hattori	8	0	0	3	5	0
17	(Japan) Noritake Takahara	7	7	0	0	0	0
17	(United Kingdom) Geoff Lees	7	0	5	2	0	0
17	(Republic of Ireland) Ralph Firman	7	0	0	0	7	0
17	(Japan) Tsugio Matsuda	7	0	0	0	7	0
17	(Japan) Takashi Kogure	7	0	0	0	7	0
17	(Japan) Yuhi Sekiguchi	7	0	0	0	0	7
17	(Japan) Sho Tsuboi	7	0	0	0	0	7
24	(Japan) Toshio Suzuki	6	0	0	6	0	0
24	(Spain) Pedro de la Rosa	6	0	0	0	6	0
26	(Japan) Aguri Suzuki	5	0	0	5	0	0
26	(Italy) Marco Apicella	5	0	0	5	0	0
26	(Japan) Juichi Wakisaka	5	0	0	0	5	0
26	(Japan) Hiroaki Ishiura	5	0	0	0	0	5
30	(Japan) Kunimitsu Takahashi	4	3	1	0	0	0
30	(Germany) Volker Weidler	4	0	0	4	0	0
30	(United Kingdom) Andrew Gilbert-Scott	4	0	0	4	0	0
30	(United Kingdom) Richard Lyons	4	0	0	0	4	0
30	(Japan) Ryō Hirakawa	4	0	0	0	0	4
30	(Japan) Tadasuke Makino	4	0	0	0	0	4
30	(Japan) Nirei Fukuzumi	4	0	0	0	0	4
37	(Japan) Motoharu Kurosawa	3	3	0	0	0	0
37	(Japan) Kenji Takahashi	3	0	3	0	0	0
37	(Sweden) Stefan Johansson	3	0	3	0	0	0
37	(Italy) Mauro Martini	3	0	0	3	0	0
37	(United Kingdom) Eddie Irvine	3	0	0	3	0	0
37	(Germany) Ralf Schumacher	3	0	0	0	3	0
37	(Argentina) Norberto Fontana	3	0	0	0	3	0
37	(Japan) Masami Kageyama	3	0	0	0	3	0
37	(Netherlands) Tom Coronel	3	0	0	0	3	0
37	(Japan) Yuji Ide	3	0	0	0	3	0
37	(Japan) Takuya Izawa	3	0	0	0	2	1
37	(New Zealand) Nick Cassidy	3	0	0	0	0	3
37	(New Zealand) Liam Lawson	3	0	0	0	0	3
37	(Argentina) Sacha Fenestraz	3	0	0	0	0	3
51	(Japan) Takao Wada	2	0	0	2	0	0
51	(Japan) Ukyo Katayama	2	0	0	2	0	0
51	(Japan) Takuya Kurosawa	2	0	0	1	1	0
51	(Japan) Katsutomo Kaneishi	2	0	0	0	2	0
51	(Japan) Masahiko Kageyama	2	0	0	0	2	0
51	(Japan) Hidetoshi Mitsusada	2	0	0	0	2	0
51	(Japan) Kohei Hirate	2	0	0	0	2	0
51	(Belgium) Stoffel Vandoorne	2	0	0	0	0	2
51	(Japan) Yuji Kunimoto	2	0	0	0	0	2
51	(France) Pierre Gasly	2	0	0	0	0	2
51	(Japan) Ukyo Sasahara	2	0	0	0	0	2
51	(Japan) Ritomo Miyata	2	0	0	0	0	2
51	(Japan) Ayumu Iwasa	2	0	0	0	0	2
51	(Brazil) Igor Omura Fraga	2	0	0	0	0	2
65	(France) Jacques Laffite	1	1	0	0	0	0
65	(Italy) Riccardo Patrese	1	1	0	0	0	0
65	(Switzerland) Marc Surer	1	0	1	0	0	0
65	(Italy) Beppe Gabbiani	1	0	1	0	0	0
65	(Japan) Naohiro Fujita	1	0	1	0	0	0
65	(United Kingdom) Kenny Acheson	1	0	1	0	0	0
65	(New Zealand) Mike Thackwell	1	0	1	0	0	0
65	(Netherlands) Jan Lammers	1	0	0	1	0	0
65	(Italy) Emanuele Pirro	1	0	0	1	0	0
65	(Japan) Hitoshi Ogawa	1	0	0	1	0	0
65	(Japan) Akihiko Nakaya	1	0	0	1	0	0
65	(Brazil) Paulo Carcasci	1	0	0	1	0	0
65	(Austria) Roland Ratzenberger	1	0	0	1	0	0
65	(Sweden) Thomas Danielsson	1	0	0	1	0	0
65	(Denmark) Tom Kristensen	1	0	0	1	0	0
65	(Japan) Toshihiro Kaneishi	1	0	0	0	1	0
65	(Italy) Ronnie Quintarelli	1	0	0	0	1	0
65	(Japan) Seiji Ara	1	0	0	0	1	0
65	(Japan) Kosuke Matsuura	1	0	0	0	1	0
65	(Japan) Kazuya Oshima	1	0	0	0	1	0
65	(Japan) Koudai Tsukakoshi	1	0	0	0	1	0
65	(Spain) Álex Palou	1	0	0	0	0	1
65	(Japan) Kenta Yamashita	1	0	0	0	0	1
65	(Japan) Toshiki Oyu	1	0	0	0	0	1
65	(France) Giuliano Alesi	1	0	0	0	0	1
65	(Japan) Hiroki Otsu	1	0	0	0	0	1
65	(Japan) Nobuharu Matsushita	1	0	0	0	0	1

==== By team ====
Rank	Team	Wins
1	(Japan) Team Impul	92
2	(Japan) Nakajima Racing	51
3	(Japan) Team TOM'S	43
4	(Japan) Team LeMans	37
5	(Japan) Dandelion Racing	32
6	(Japan) Team Mugen	28
7	(Japan) Team Nova	21
8	(Japan) Heroes Racing	17
9	(Japan) Team Ikuzawa	12
10	(Japan) Heroes Racing with Nakajima	11
11	(Japan) Dome	10
12	(Japan) Cerumo・Inging	9
13	(Japan) Takahara Racing	7
14	(Japan) Mooncraft	6
14	(Japan) Speed Star Wheel Racing Team	6
14	(Japan) Stellar International	6
17	(Japan) Victory Circle Club	5
17	(Japan) Team Cerumo	5
17	(Japan) Autobacs Racing Team Aguri	5
20	(Japan) Tomica Racing Team	4
20	(Japan) Team 5ZIGEN	4
20	(Japan) Kondo Racing	4
23	(Japan) Kojima Engineering	3
23	(Japan) Tomei Jidousha	3
23	(Japan) Universal Racing	3
26	(Japan) Harada Racing Company	2
26	(Japan) Pal Sports	2
26	(Japan) Le Garage Cox Racing Team + Mooncraft	2
26	(Japan) Team Take One	2
26	(Japan) Team 22	2
26	(Japan) Rookie Racing	2
32	(Japan) Kurosawa Enterprise	1
32	(Japan) Sakai Racing Team	1
32	(Japan) Suntec Racing Team	1
32	(Japan) Navi Connection Racing	1
32	(Japan) ARTA Team LeMans	1
32	(Japan) Inging Motorsport	1
32	(Japan) Mugen Team Goh	1
32	(Japan) B-Max Racing Team	1

==== By chassis constructor ====
Rank	Chassis constructor	Wins
1	(United Kingdom) Lola	124
2	(Italy) Dallara	108
3	(United Kingdom) March	75
4	(United Kingdom) Reynard	72
5	(United States) Swift	38
6	(Japan) Nova	11
7	(Japan) Dome	5
8	(United Kingdom) Chevron	3
9	(United Kingdom) Brabham	2
9	(Japan) Kojima	2
9	(United Kingdom) Spirit	2
12	(United Kingdom) Surtees	1
12	(United States) G-Force	1

==== By engine manufacturer ====
Rank	Engine manufacturer	Wins
1	(Japan) Mugen	160
2	(Japan) Honda	118
3	(Japan) Toyota	98
4	(Germany) BMW	52
5	(United Kingdom) Cosworth	8
6	(United Kingdom) Cosworth/ (Japan) Yamaha	6
7	(United States) Ford	3
7	(Japan) Yamaha	3

==== By tire supplier ====
Rank	Tire Supplier	Wins
1	B Bridgestone	311
2	Y Yokohama	100
3	D Dunlop	33

=== Pole positions ===
==== By driver ====
Rank	Driver	Total poles	All Japan F2000	All Japan F2	All Japan F3000	Formula Nippon	Super Formula
1	(Japan) Kazuyoshi Hoshino	42	14	18	9	1	0
2	(Japan) Tomoki Nojiri	25	0	0	0	0	25
3	(Japan) Satoru Nakajima	23	0	23	0	0	0
4	(Japan) Satoshi Motoyama	20	0	0	0	20	0
5	(Japan) Toranosuke Takagi	16	0	0	2	14	0
6	(Japan) Takashi Kogure	15	0	0	0	15	0
7	(United States) Ross Cheever	13	0	0	13	0	0
7	(Japan) Tsugio Matsuda	13	0	0	0	13	0
7	(Japan) Naoki Yamamoto	13	0	0	0	1	12
10	(Germany) André Lotterer	12	0	0	0	5	7
11	(United Kingdom) Geoff Lees	11	0	3	8	0	0
12	(Japan) Keiji Matsumoto	9	0	8	1	0	0
12	(Japan) Juichi Wakisaka	9	0	0	0	9	0
12	(Brazil) João Paulo de Oliveira	9	0	0	0	7	2
15	(United Kingdom) Richard Lyons	8	0	0	0	8	0
15	(France) Benoît Tréluyer	8	0	0	0	8	0
15	(France) Loïc Duval	8	0	0	0	6	2
15	(Japan) Hiroaki Ishiura	8	0	0	0	0	8
19	(Japan) Masahiro Hasemi	7	2	4	1	0	0
19	(United Kingdom) Eddie Irvine	7	0	0	7	0	0
19	(Japan) Ayumu Iwasa	7	0	0	0	0	7
22	(Japan) Hitoshi Ogawa	6	0	0	6	0	0
22	(Italy) Mauro Martini	6	0	0	6	0	0
22	(Republic of Ireland) Ralph Firman	6	0	0	0	6	0
22	(Japan) Yuhi Sekiguchi	6	0	0	0	0	6
26	(United Kingdom) Andrew Gilbert-Scott	5	0	0	5	0	0
26	(Japan) Naoki Hattori	5	0	0	3	2	0
26	(Japan) Kazuki Nakajima	5	0	0	0	1	4
29	(Japan) Aguri Suzuki	4	0	0	4	0	0
29	(Japan) Takuya Kurosawa	4	0	0	2	2	0
29	(Spain) Pedro de la Rosa	4	0	0	0	4	0
29	(Netherlands) Tom Coronel	4	0	0	0	4	0
29	(Japan) Takeshi Tsuchiya	4	0	0	0	4	0
29	(Japan) Ryo Hirakawa	4	0	0	0	0	4
29	(Japan) Tadasuke Makino	4	0	0	0	0	4
29	(Japan) Nirei Fukuzumi	4	0	0	0	0	4
37	(Japan) Noritake Takahara	3	3	0	0	0	0
37	(Japan) Akihiko Nakaya	3	0	0	3	0	0
37	(Japan) Ukyo Katayama	3	0	0	3	0	0
37	(Italy) Marco Apicella	3	0	0	3	0	0
37	(Japan) Takuya Izawa	3	0	0	0	2	1
37	(New Zealand) Nick Cassidy	3	0	0	0	0	3
37	(Spain) Álex Palou	3	0	0	0	0	3
37	(Japan) Toshiki Oyu	3	0	0	0	0	3
37	(Japan) Kenta Yamashita	3	0	0	0	0	3
37	(Japan) Sho Tsuboi	3	0	0	0	0	3
47	(Japan) Hiromu Tanaka	2	2	0	0	0	0
47	(Japan) Naohiiro Fujita	2	1	1	0	0	0
47	(Sweden) Stefan Johansson	2	0	2	0	0	0
47	(Japan) Masanori Sekiya	2	0	0	2	0	0
47	(Austria) Roland Ratzenberger	2	0	0	2	0	0
47	(Japan) Toshio Suzuki	2	0	0	1	1	0
47	(Germany) Michael Krumm	2	0	0	0	2	0
47	(Germany) Ralf Schumacher	2	0	0	0	2	0
47	(Japan) Masahiko Kageyama	2	0	0	1	1	0
47	(Japan) Masami Kageyama	2	0	0	0	2	0
47	(Japan) Ryo Michigami	2	0	0	0	2	0
47	(Japan) Yuji Ide	2	0	0	0	2	0
47	(Japan) Kazuya Oshima	2	0	0	0	2	0
47	(Japan) Koudai Tsukakoshi	2	0	0	0	2	0
47	(Italy) Andrea Caldarelli	2	0	0	0	0	2
47	(Japan) Yuji Kunimoto	2	0	0	0	0	2
47	(Japan) Kakunoshin Ohta	2	0	0	0	0	2
64	(Australia) Vern Schuppan	1	1	0	0	0	0
64	(Japan) Motoharu Kurosawa	1	1	0	0	0	0
64	(Japan) Moto Kitano	1	1	0	0	0	0
64	(Japan) Kunimitsu Takahashi	1	1	0	0	0	0
64	(Italy) Bruno Giacomelli	1	0	1	0	0	0
64	(Sweden) Eje Elgh	1	0	1	0	0	0
64	(Japan) Toru Takahashi	1	0	1	0	0	0
64	(Brazil) Roberto Moreno	1	0	1	0	0	0
64	(Japan) Takao Wada	1	0	0	1	0	0
64	(Germany) Volker Weidler	1	0	0	1	0	0
64	(Germany) Heinz-Harald Frentzen	1	0	0	1	0	0
64	(Denmark) Tom Kristensen	1	0	0	1	0	0
64	(Japan) Katsutomo Kaneishi	1	0	0	0	1	0
64	(Argentina) Norberto Fontana	1	0	0	0	1	0
64	(Japan) Hideki Noda	1	0	0	0	1	0
64	(Japan) Hidetoshi Mitsusada	1	0	0	0	1	0
64	(United Kingdom) Peter Dumbreck	1	0	0	0	1	0
64	(Japan) Toshihiro Kaneishi	1	0	0	0	1	0
64	(Japan) Kohei Hirate	1	0	0	0	1	0
64	(Belgium) Stoffel Vandoorne	1	0	0	0	0	1
64	(United Kingdom) Jann Mardenborough	1	0	0	0	0	1
64	(Brazil) Sérgio Sette Câmara	1	0	0	0	0	1
64	(France) Giuliano Alesi	1	0	0	0	0	1
64	(Japan) Hiroki Otsu	1	0	0	0	0	1
64	(Japan) Nobuharu Matsushita	1	0	0	0	0	1
64	(Japan) Ukyo Sasahara	1	0	0	0	0	1
64	(New Zealand) Liam Lawson	1	0	0	0	0	1
64	(Japan) Sena Sakaguchi	1	0	0	0	0	1
64	(Argentina) Sacha Fenestraz	1	0	0	0	0	1
64	(United Kingdom) Zak O'Sullivan	1	0	0	0	0	1

==== By team ====
Rank	Team	Poles
1	(Japan) Team Impul	77
2	(Japan) Nakajima Racing	47
3	(Japan) Team LeMans	45
4	(Japan) Team Mugen	41
5	(Japan) Heroes Racing	32
6	(Japan) Dandelion Racing	28
7	(Japan) Team Nova	21
8	(Japan) Team TOM'S	21
9	(Japan) Heroes Racing with Nakajima	17
10	(Japan) Stellar International	14
11	(Japan) Autobacs Racing Team Aguri	13
12	(Japan) Cerumo・Inging	11
13	(Japan) Team Cerumo	9
14	(Japan) Mooncraft	7
14	(Japan) Kondo Racing	7
16	(Japan) Dome	5
17	(Japan) Victory Circle Club	4
17	(Japan) Tomica Racing Team	4
17	(Japan) Team Ikuzawa	4
17	(Japan) Suntec Racing Team	4
17	(Japan) Team 5ZIGEN	4
22	(Japan) Takahara Racing	3
23	(Japan) Speed Star Wheel Racing Team	2
23	(Japan) Harada Racing Company	2
23	(Japan) Leyton House Racing Team	2
23	(Japan) Le Garage Cox Racing Team + Mooncraft	2
23	(Japan) TGM Grand Prix	2
23	(Hong Kong) KCMG	2
29	(N/A) Singapore Airlines	1
29	(N/A) Niscait Racing	1
29	(Japan) Kojima Engineering	1
29	(Japan) Sakai Racing Team	1
29	(N/A) Team Phoenix	1
29	(N/A) March Racing Limited	1
29	(United Kingdom) Spirit Racing	1
29	(United Kingdom) Ralt	1
29	(Japan) Pal Sports	1
29	(Japan) Team Take One	1
29	(Japan) Navi Connection Racing	1
29	(Japan) Team LeyJun	1
29	(Japan) Team 22	1
29	(Japan) ARTA Team LeMans	1
29	(Japan) Buzz Racing with B-Max	1
29	(Japan) Mugen Team Goh	1
29	(Japan) B-Max Racing Team	1
29	(Japan) Rookie Racing	1

==== By chassis constructor ====
Rank	Chassis constructor	Poles
1	(United Kingdom) Lola	128
2	(Italy) Dallara	111
3	(United Kingdom) Reynard	75
4	(United Kingdom) March	70
5	(United States) Swift	38
6	(Japan) Nova	16
7	(Japan) Dome	3
8	(United Kingdom) Chevron	2
8	(United States) G-Force	2
10	(Germany) Maurer	1
10	(United Kingdom) Spirit	1
10	(United Kingdom) Ralt	1

==== By engine manufacturer ====
Rank	Engine manufacturer	Poles
1	(Japan) Mugen	167
2	(Japan) Honda	121
3	(Japan) Toyota	87
4	(Germany) BMW	60
5	(United Kingdom) Cosworth/ (Japan) Yamaha	5
6	(United Kingdom) Cosworth	4
7	(Japan) Yamaha	3
8	(United States) Ford	1

==== By tire supplier ====
Rank	Tire Supplier	Poles
1	B Bridgestone	320
2	Y Yokohama	96
3	D Dunlop	31
4	F Firestone	1

=== Fastest Laps ===
==== By driver ====
Rank	Driver	Total FLs	All Japan F2000	All Japan F2	All Japan F3000	Formula Nippon	Super Formula
1	(Japan) Kazuyoshi Hoshino	28	1	12	15	0	0
2	(Japan) Satoshi Motoyama	20	0	0	0	20	0
3	(Brazil) João Paulo de Oliveira	15	0	0	0	7	8
4	(Japan) Satoru Nakajima	11	0	11	0	0	0
5	(Japan) Juichi Wakisaka	10	0	0	0	10	0
5	(Japan) Takashi Kogure	10	0	0	0	8	2
5	(Germany) André Lotterer	10	0	0	0	5	5
8	(France) Loïc Duval	9	0	0	0	8	1
8	(Japan) Yuhi Sekiguchi	9	0	0	0	0	9
10	(Japan) Tomoki Nojiri	8	0	0	0	0	8
10	(Japan) Kamui Kobayashi	8	0	0	0	0	8
12	(Japan) Takao Wada	7	0	0	7	0	0
12	(Italy) Marco Apicella	7	0	0	7	0	0
12	(Japan) Sho Tsuboi	7	0	0	0	0	7
15	(Japan) Naoki Hattori	6	0	0	2	4	0
15	(Japan) Hideki Noda	6	0	0	0	6	0
15	(Japan) Tsugio Matsuda	6	0	0	0	6	0
15	(Japan) Naoki Yamamoto	6	0	0	0	1	5
19	(United States) Ross Cheever	5	0	0	5	0	0
19	(Japan) Masahiko Kageyama	5	0	0	3	2	0
19	(Germany) Michael Krumm	5	0	0	1	4	0
19	(Japan) Toranosuke Takagi	5	0	0	1	4	0
19	(United Kingdom) Richard Lyons	5	0	0	0	5	0
19	(France) Benoît Tréluyer	5	0	0	0	5	0
19	(Japan) Kazuki Nakajima	5	0	0	0	1	4
19	(Japan) Hiroaki Ishiura	5	0	0	0	2	3
19	(Japan) Ryo Hirakawa	5	0	0	0	0	5
28	(United Kingdom) Geoff Lees	4	0	4	0	0	0
28	(Japan) Hitoshi Ogawa	4	0	0	4	0	0
28	(Japan) Keiji Matsumoto	4	0	3	1	0	0
28	(Italy) Mauro Martini	4	0	0	4	0	0
28	(Japan) Toshio Suzuki	4	0	0	4	0	0
28	(Japan) Takuya Kurosawa	4	0	0	3	1	0
28	(Argentina) Norberto Fontana	4	0	0	0	4	0
28	(Japan) Katsutomo Kaneishi	4	0	0	1	3	0
28	(Republic of Ireland) Ralph Firman	4	0	0	0	4	0
28	(Japan) Yuji Tachikawa	4	0	0	0	4	0
28	(Japan) Kohei Hirate	4	0	0	0	4	0
28	(New Zealand) Nick Cassidy	4	0	0	0	0	4
28	(Japan) Toshiki Oyu	4	0	0	0	0	4
28	(Brazil) Igor Omura Fraga	4	0	0	0	0	4
42	(Japan) Naohiiro Fujita	3	0	3	0	0	0
42	(Japan) Kenji Takahashi	3	0	3	0	0	0
42	(Japan) Aguri Suzuki	3	0	0	3	0	0
42	(Japan) Ukyo Katayama	3	0	0	3	0	0
42	(United Kingdom) Andrew Gilbert-Scott	3	0	0	3	0	0
42	(Japan) Shinji Nakano	3	0	0	0	3	0
42	(Spain) Pedro de la Rosa	3	0	0	0	3	0
42	(Japan) Masami Kageyama	3	0	0	0	3	0
42	(Japan) Ryo Michigami	3	0	0	0	3	0
42	(Japan) Yuji Ide	3	0	0	0	3	0
42	(Japan) Takeshi Tsuchiya	3	0	0	0	3	0
42	(Japan) Koudai Tsukakoshi	3	0	0	0	1	2
42	(Japan) Nirei Fukuzumi	3	0	0	0	0	3
42	(Japan) Ayumu Iwasa	3	0	0	0	0	3
42	(Japan) Kakunoshin Ohta	3	0	0	0	0	3
57	(Germany) Volker Weidler	2	0	0	2	0	0
57	(United Kingdom) Eddie Irvine	2	0	0	2	0	0
57	(Germany) Heinz-Harald Frentzen	2	0	0	2	0	0
57	(United States) Jeff Krosnoff	2	0	0	2	0	0
57	(Netherlands) Tom Coronel	2	0	0	0	2	0
57	(Japan) Hidetoshi Mitsusada	2	0	0	0	2	0
57	(Brazil) Roberto Streit	2	0	0	0	2	0
57	(Japan) Hironobu Yasuda	2	0	0	0	2	0
57	(India) Narain Karthikeyan	2	0	0	0	0	2
57	(Sweden) Felix Rosenqvist	2	0	0	0	0	2
57	(Spain) Álex Palou	2	0	0	0	0	2
57	(Japan) Atsushi Miyake	2	0	0	0	0	2
57	(New Zealand) Liam Lawson	3	0	0	0	0	3
57	(Japan) Ritomo Miyata	2	0	0	0	0	2
57	(Japan) Ren Sato	2	0	0	0	0	2
57	(Japan) Tadasuke Makino	2	0	0	0	0	2
73	(Japan) Kuniomi Nagamatsu	1	1	0	0	0	0
73	(Switzerland) Marc Surer	1	0	1	0	0	0
73	(Italy) Bruno Giacomelli	1	0	1	0	0	0
73	(Italy) Beppe Gabbiani	1	0	1	0	0	0
73	(Japan) Masahiro Hasemi	1	0	1	0	0	0
73	(Italy) Teo Fabi	1	0	1	0	0	0
73	(Belgium) Thierry Boutsen	1	0	1	0	0	
73	(Japan) Osamu Nakako	1	0	1	0	0	0
73	(Sweden) Stefan Johansson	1	0	1	0	0	0
73	(Sweden) Eje Elgh	1	0	1	0	0	0
73	(Japan) Kunimitsu Takahashi	1	0	0	1	0	0
73	(Japan) Akihiko Nakaya	1	0	0	1	0	0
73	(Japan) Masanori Sekiya	1	0	0	1	0	0
73	(Japan) Katsumi Yamamoto	1	0	0	0	1	0
73	(Japan) Koji Yamanishi	1	0	0	0	1	0
73	(Japan) Katsuyuki Hiranaka	1	0	0	0	1	0
73	(Japan) Sakon Yamamoto	1	0	0	0	1	0
73	(Japan) Masataka Yanagida	1	0	0	0	1	0
73	(Japan) Hideki Mutoh	1	0	0	0	1	0
73	(Japan) Hiroki Yoshimoto	1	0	0	0	1	0
73	(Japan) Naoki Yokomizo	1	0	0	0	1	0
73	(Japan) Toshihiro Kaneishi	1	0	0	0	1	0
73	(Japan) Keisuke Kunimoto	1	0	0	0	1	0
73	(Italy) Kei Cozzolino	1	0	0	0	1	0
73	(Japan) Takuya Izawa	1	0	0	0	1	0
73	(Japan) Yuichi Nakayama	1	0	0	0	0	1
73	(United Kingdom) Jann Mardenborough	1	0	0	0	0	1
73	(United Kingdom) James Rossiter	1	0	0	0	0	1
73	(Austria) Lucas Auer	1	0	0	0	0	1
73	(Russia) Artem Markelov	1	0	0	0	0	1
73	(Japan) Hiroki Otsu	1	0	0	0	0	1
73	(Japan) Kazuya Oshima	1	0	0	0	0	1
73	(United Kingdom) Ben Barnicoat	1	0	0	0	0	1
73	(Japan) Iori Kimura	1	0	0	0	0	1
73	(Japan) Seita Nonaka	1	0	0	0	0	1
73	(Japan) Sena Sakaguchi	1	0	0	0	0	1

== See also ==
- JAF Grand Prix
