= Lola B03/51 =

Open-wheel formula racing car

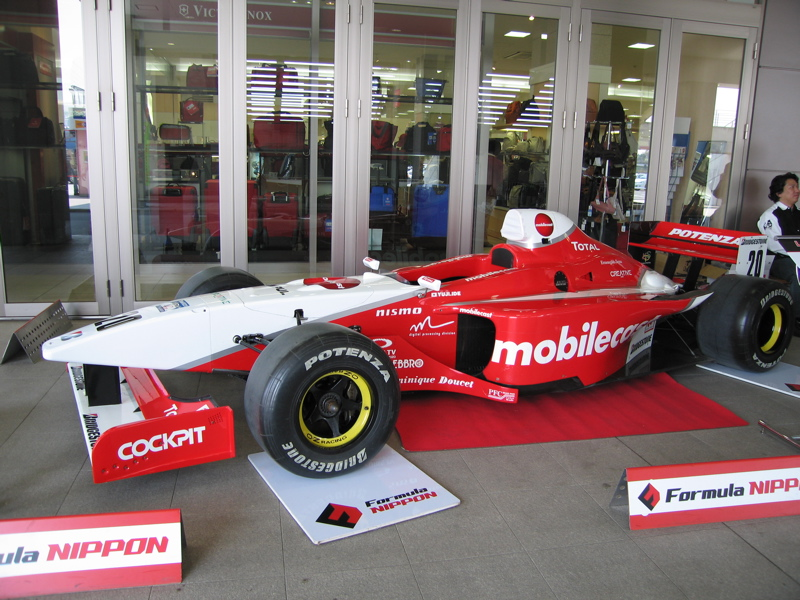
- Category: Formula Nippon
- Constructor: Lola Cars
- Successor: Lola B06/51

Technical specifications
- Chassis: Carbon fiber Honeycomb composite
- Length: 4,667.5 mm (183.76 in)
- Width: 1,790 mm (70 in)
- Axle track: 1,503 mm (59.2 in) (front); 1,389 mm (54.7 in) (rear)
- Wheelbase: 3,000 mm (120 in)
- Engine: Mid-engine, longitudinally mounted, 3.0 L (183.1 cu in), Mugen MF308, 90° V8, NA
- Transmission: Lola LT2A 6-speed sequential manual
- Power: 500–550 hp (373–410 kW)
- Weight: 590 kg (1,300 lb)
- Tyres: Bridgestone POTENZA

Competition history
- Debut: 2003
Wins
28

The Lola B03/51 is an open-wheel formula racing car, designed, developed and built by Lola for the Japanese Formula Nippon championship series, in 2003. It was powered by a naturally aspirated 3,000 cc (180 cu in) Mugen MF308 engine that produced around 550 hp (410 kW) @ 13,500 rpm.
