= Lola B06/51 =

Open-wheel formula racing car

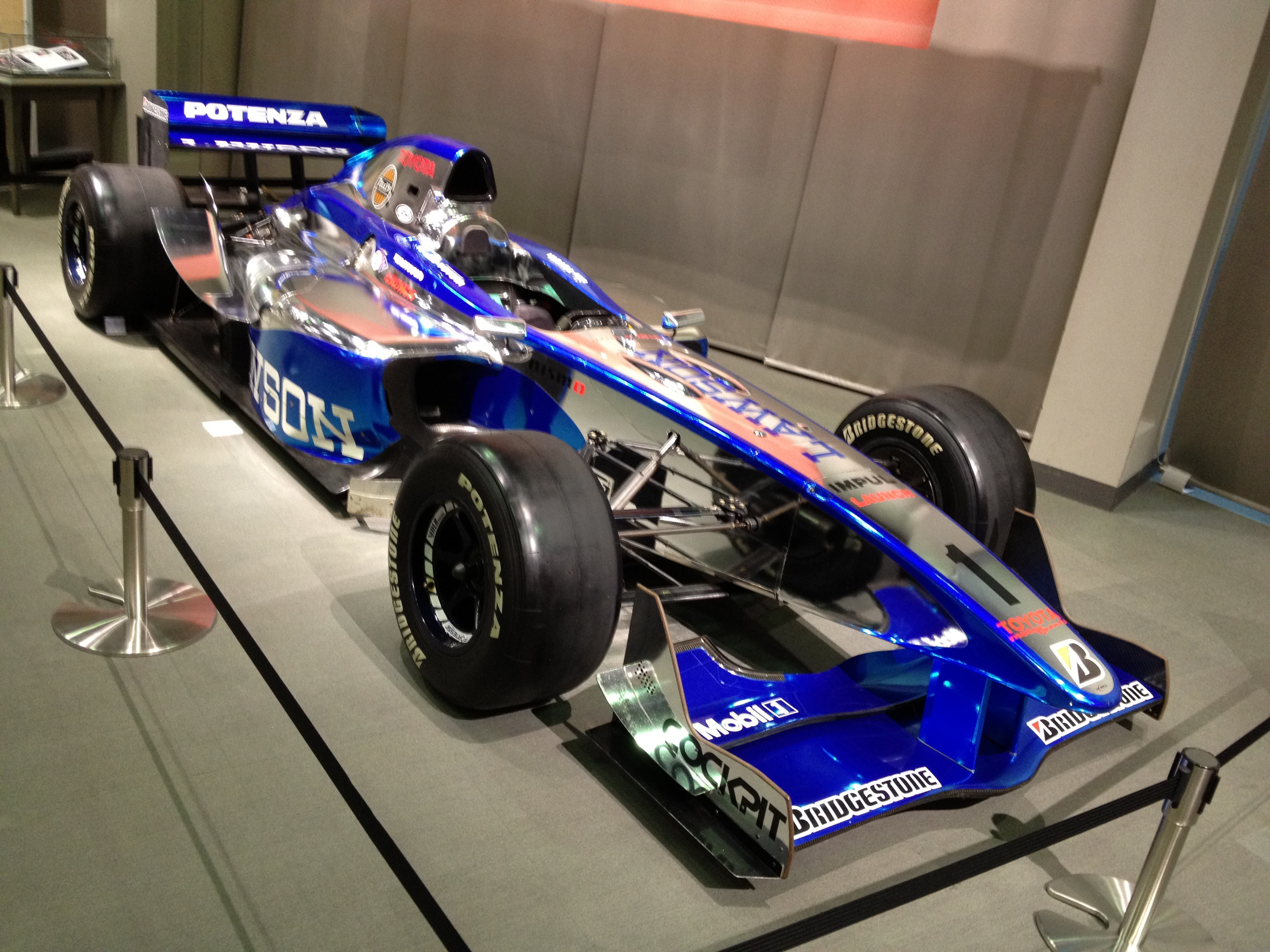
- Category: Formula Nippon
- Constructor: Lola Cars
- Predecessor: Lola B03/51
- Successor: Swift FN09

Technical specifications
- Chassis: Carbon fiber Honeycomb composite
- Length: 4,667.5 mm (183.76 in)
- Width: 1,790 mm (70 in)
- Axle track: Front: 1,503 mm (59.2 in); Rear: 1,389 mm (54.7 in)
- Wheelbase: 3,000 mm (120 in)
- Engine: Mid-engine, longitudinally mounted, 3.0 L (183.1 cu in), Toyota RV8, 90° V8, NA; Mid-engine, longitudinally mounted, 3.0 L (183.1 cu in), Mugen MF308, 90° V8, NA
- Transmission: Lola LT2A 6-speed sequential paddle-shift
- Power: 500–550 hp (373–410 kW)
- Weight: 666 kg (1,468 lb)
- Tyres: Bridgestone POTENZA

Competition history
- Debut: 2006

The Lola B06/51, also known as the Lola FN06, is an open-wheel formula racing car, designed, developed and built by Lola for the Japanese Formula Nippon championship series, in 2006.

== History ==
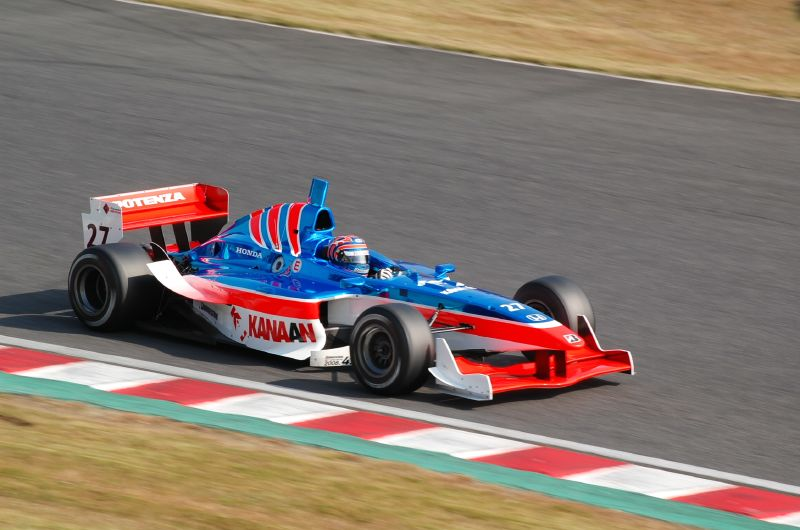
Tony Kanaan driving a Lola during the final race in the 2007 Formula Nippon season at Suzuka

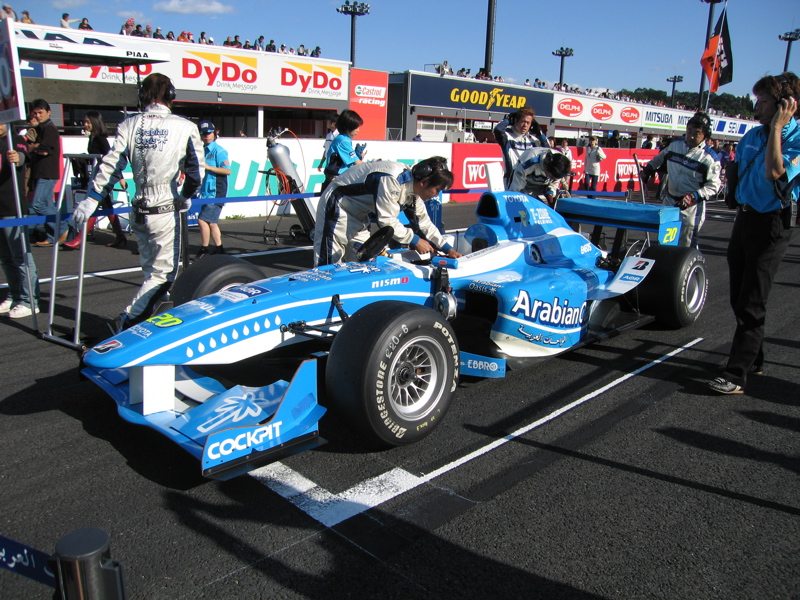
Lola B06/51 in 2007

The car, manufactured by the British manufacturer Lola Racing Cars, was the only single-seater allowed in the Formula Nippon championship between 2006 and 2008. It replaced the previous Lola B03/51 chassis, which had been used between 2003 and 2005.

Its introduction also corresponded with the opening to the use of engines supplied by Honda and Toyota, replacing the monopoly of Mugen Motorsports. In 2009 the Lola FN06 was replaced in the Formula Nippon by the Swift FN09.

== Technical specifications ==
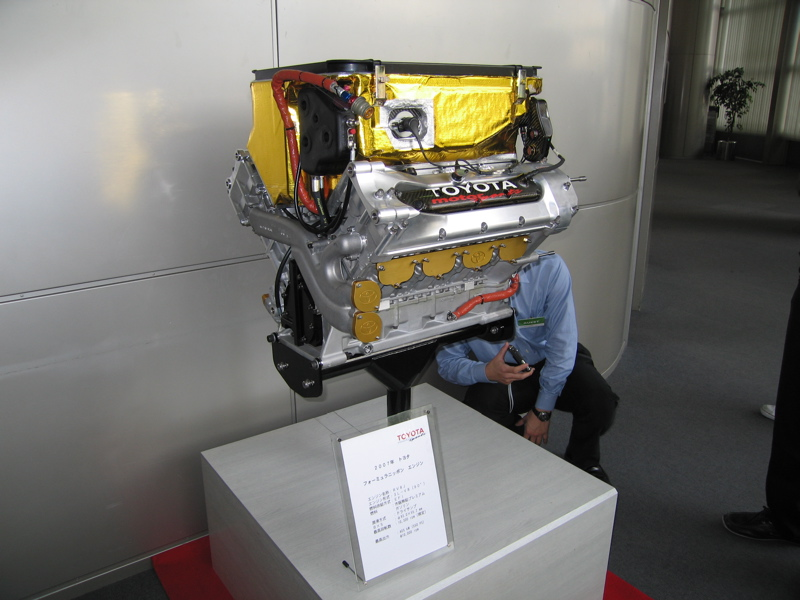
TOYOTA RV8J engine

It was powered by a naturally aspirated 3,000 cc (180 cu in) Toyota RV8 or Mugen MF308 engine that produced around 550 hp (410 kW) @ 13,500 rpm. This places the FN06 on a level compared to that of the cars used in championships in Europe, between the car of the GP2 Series and that of the Formula Renault 3.5 in the World Series by Renault.
