= Swift FN09 =

Racing car for the Super Formula between the 2009 and 2013 seasons

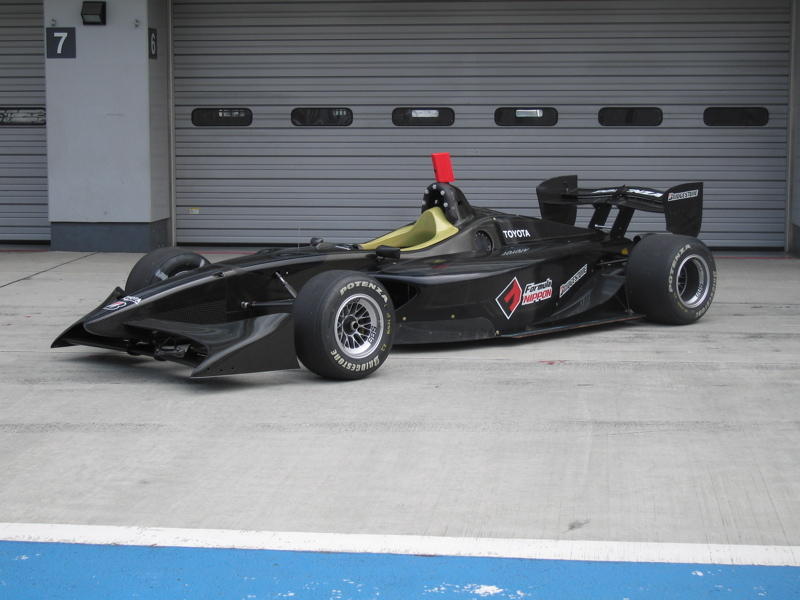
- Category: Super Formula
- Constructor: Swift Engineering
- Predecessor: Lola B06/51
- Successor: Dallara SF14

Technical specifications
- Length: 4,775 mm (188.0 in)
- Width: 2,000 mm (78.7 in)
- Height: 960 mm (37.8 in)
- Wheelbase: 3,000 mm (118.1 in)
- Engine: Honda HR-09E/HR-10E or Toyota RV8K, 3.4 L (207 cu in), V8, MR
- Transmission: Ricardo 6-speed sequential
- Weight: 670 kg (1,477.1 lb) (including driver)
- Brakes: Carbon
- Tyres: Bridgestone

Competition history
- Debut: 2009 Formula Nippon season
- Last event: 2013 JAF Grand Prix

The Swift FN09 was the sole racing car for the Super Formula (formerly: Formula Nippon) between 2009 and 2013. The initial FN09 version was upgraded for the 2013 season dubbed SF13.

== History ==
After many years of Lola Cars competition in Formula Nippon a new chassis was needed for the 2009 season. As early as 2007 American company Swift Engineering, headed by former Japanese racing driver Hiro Matsushita, was selected to provide the new racing car to all teams. The Swift FN09 was designed by Swift Engineering chief designer Chris Norris. Dutch engineer Casper van der Schoot was the program director. The car was initially intended to compete from 2009 to 2011, however the run of the race car was extended through 2013.

The racecar was characterized by the distinctive exterior appearance. The dual wing design of the front wing and rear wing provided the car with 750 kg of downforce (in combination with the diffuser). The car made its race debut at Fuji Speedway on 5 April 2009. Kohei Hirate scored the pole position as Benoît Tréluyer won the race.

== FT5000 ==
In April 2016 it was revealed that the Swift FN09 chassis was chosen as the base chassis for a new race series, Formula Thunder 5000. The series is intended to race in New Zealand and Australia, resembling the former Tasman Series. New-Zealander Chris Lambden purchased one chassis from Swift Engineering as a prototype for the series. The rolling chassis was fitted with a 5.0 L Ford Coyote V8 engine. Michael Borland, of Borland Racing Developments, purchased the molds and drawings to build additional chassis fitted to the FT5000 specifications. The modifications included a modified front wing and heightened air box to more resemble the former Formula 5000. In the end, thanks to governing body Motorsport Australia's frustrating, constantly changing requirements for the manufacture/use of the Swift tub and accessories, the project switched to a brand new Ligier F3 tub (complete with 'halo'), adapted to take the 560hp V8, and the series, renamed the S5000 Australian Drivers' Championship, was launched late in 2019.

== Statistics ==
A total of 24 Swift FN09 chassis were built. In Formula Nippon 39 races were run with the American built chassis.

=== Best laps ===
Circuit	Best lap	
Circuit	Honda engine	Toyota engine
Suzuka Circuit	1:37.774 (Naoki Yamamoto), Round 7, 2013)	1:38.067 (João Paulo de Oliveira, Round 7, 2013)
Twin Ring Motegi	1:33.239 (Koudai Tsukakoshi, Round 7, 2011)	1:32.700 (Loïc Duval, Round 4, 2013)
Fuji International Speedway	1:23.035 (Takashi Kogure, 2013 JAF Grand Prix)	1:22.718 (Yuji Kunimoto, 2013 JAF Grand Prix)
Sports Land SUGO	1:05.843 (Loïc Duval, Round 5, 2010)	1:05.889 (Loïc Duval, Round 6, 2013)
Autopolis	1:28.523 (Koudai Tsukakoshi, Round 3, 2012)	1:29.017 (Tsugio Matsuda, Round 3, 2012)

== Gallery ==
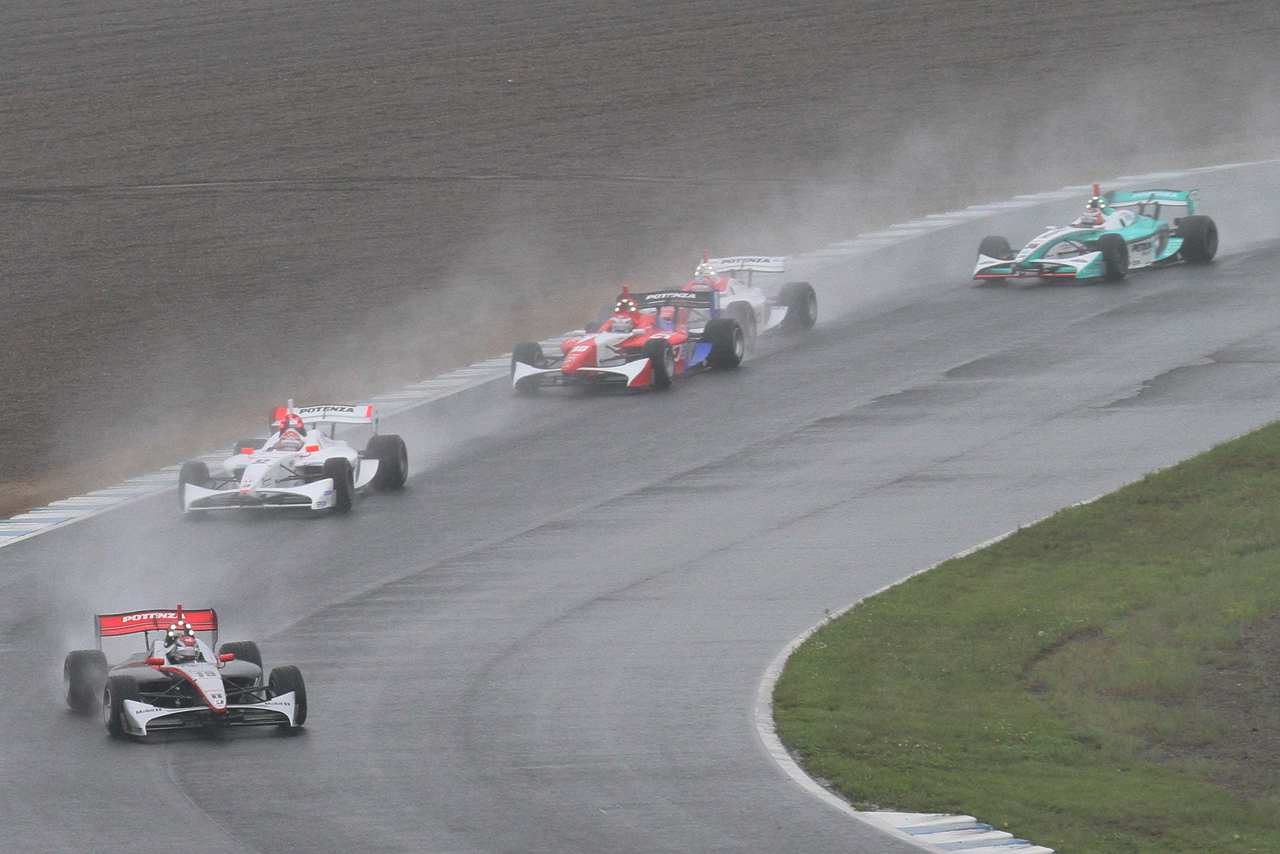
Formula Nippon at Motegi in 2010

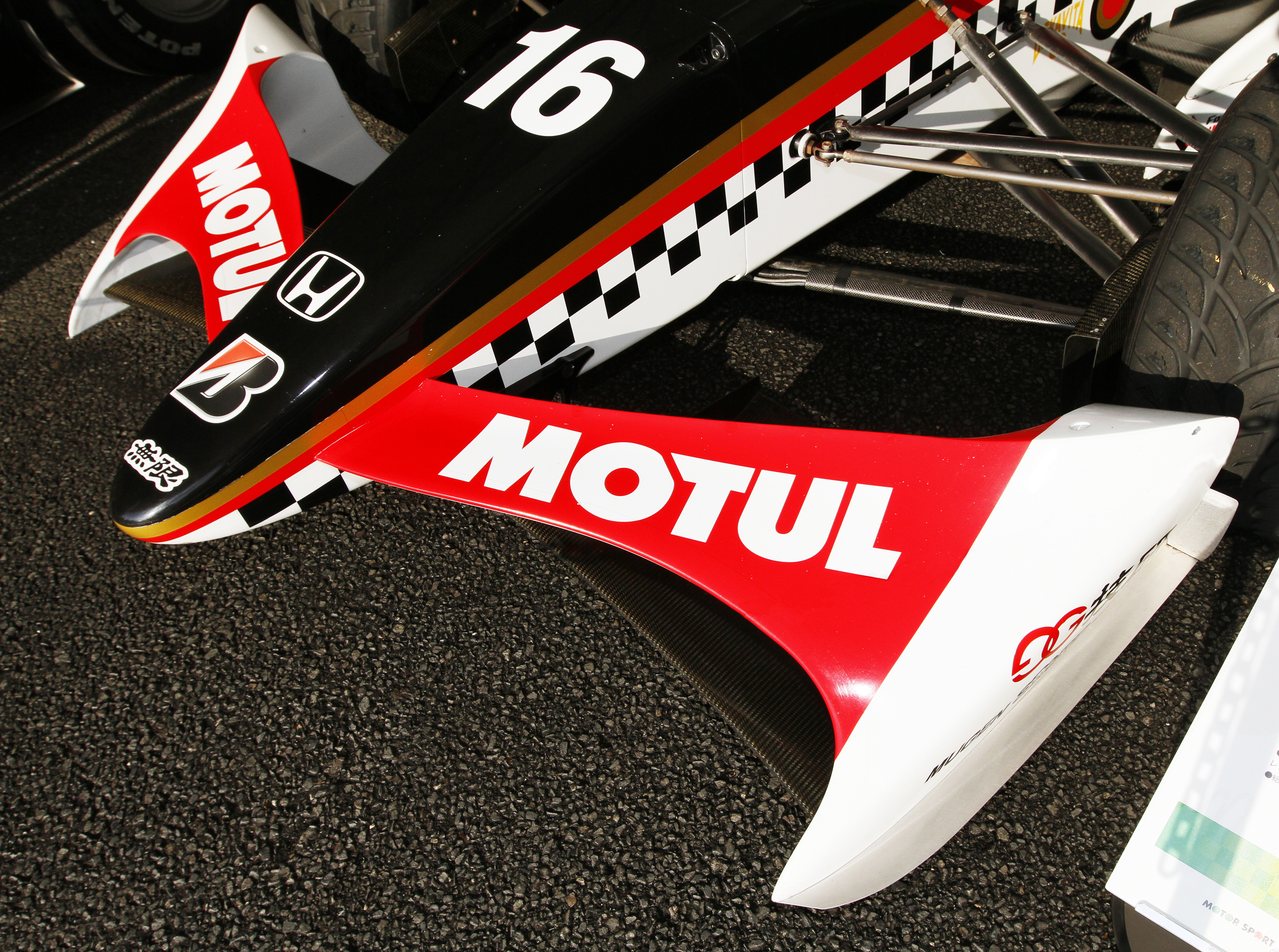
A detail picture of the front wing

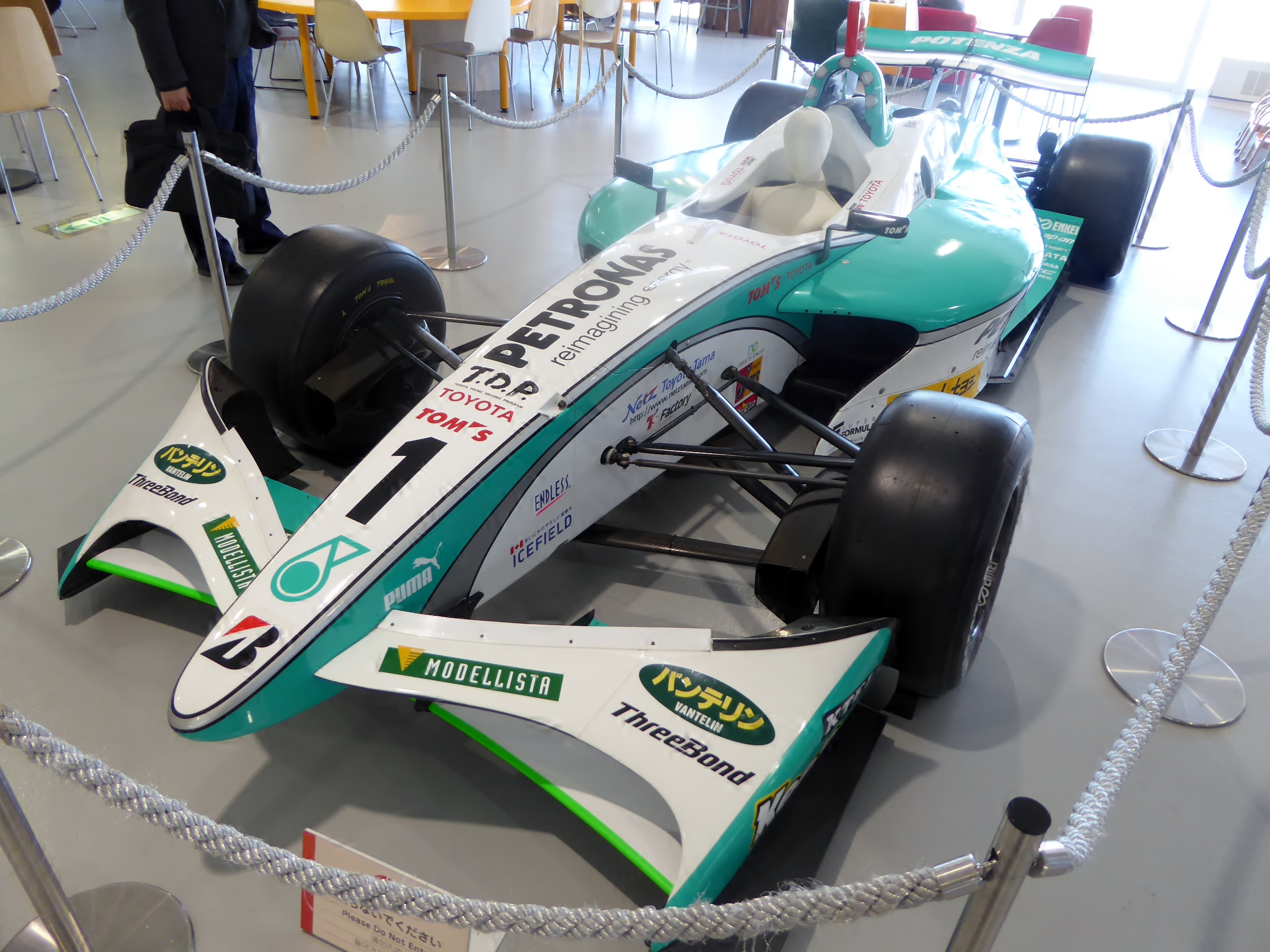
Front view of the Swift FN09 entered by Petronas Team TOM's

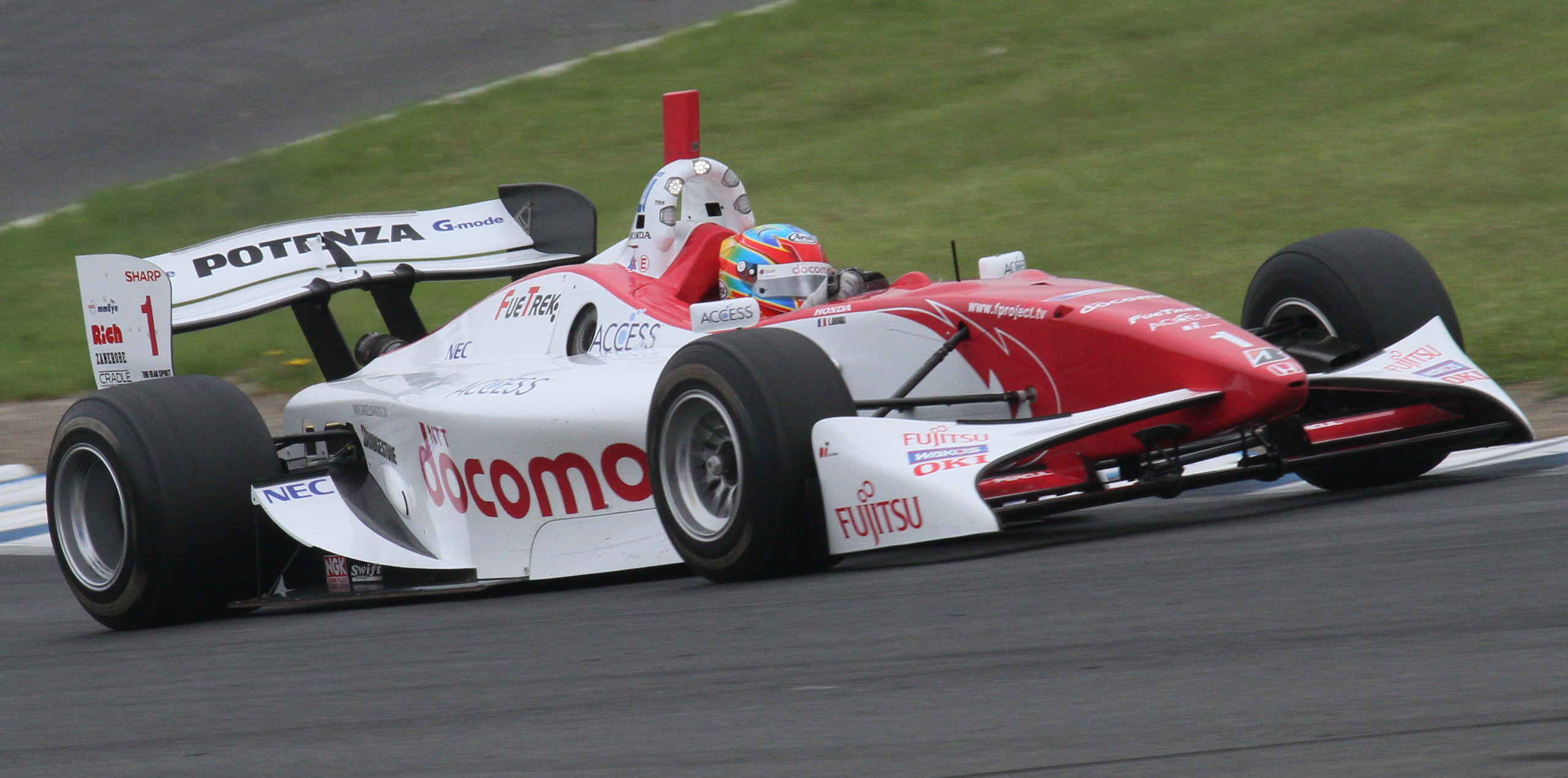
Loïc Duval at Motegi in 2010

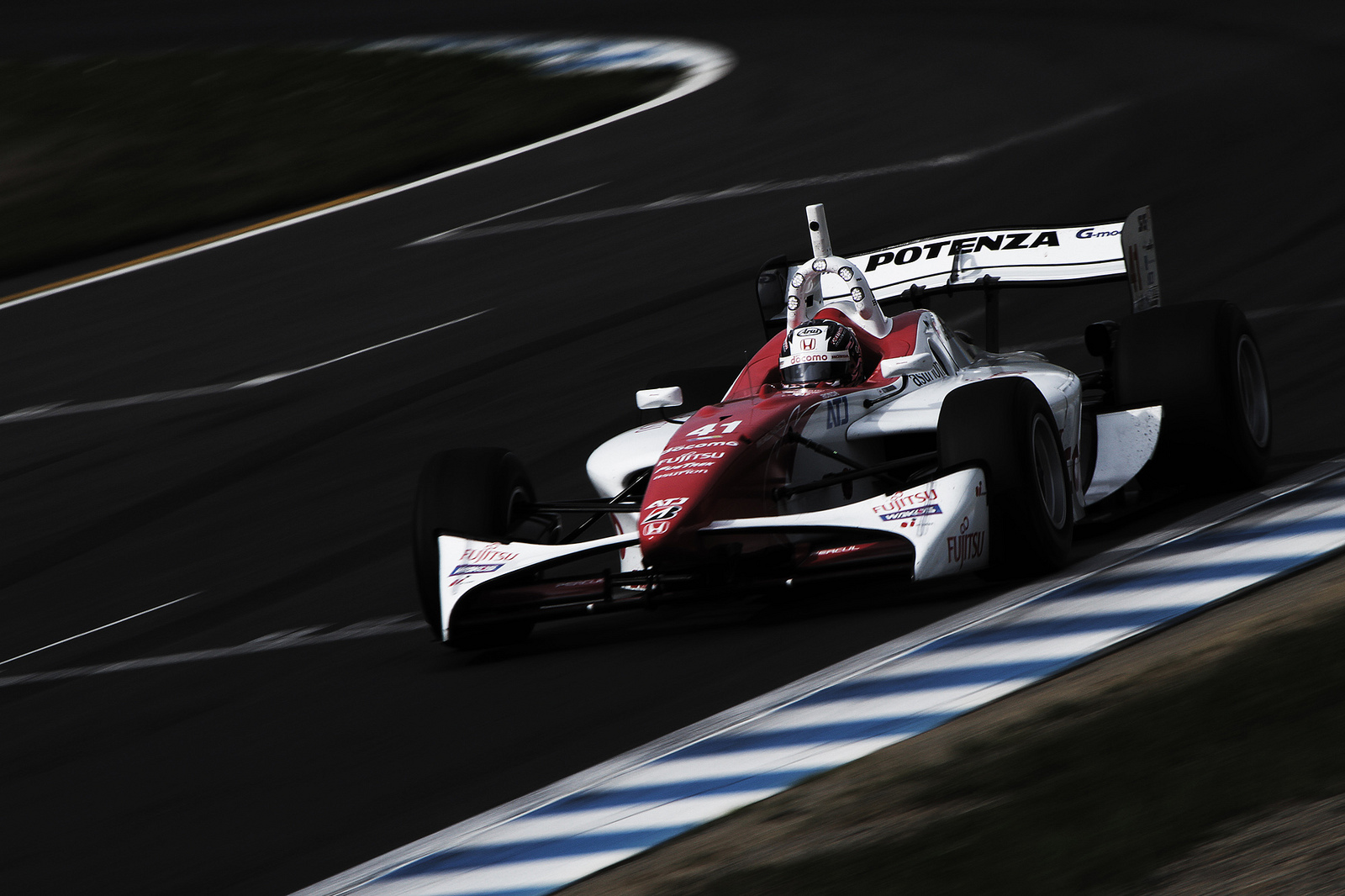
Koudai Tsukakoshi at Twin Ring Motegi in 2012
