= Honda RA260E engine =

The Honda RA260E is a four-stroke, naturally-aspirated, 2.0-liter, V6 racing engine, designed for Formula 2, which was built and developed by Honda Motor Co., Ltd, for Formula 2 racing, in 1980.

== History ==
Developed in 1980 for Formula Two racing. The designer was Nobuhiko Kawamoto. The goal was to surpass BMW's in-line 4-cylinder engine, the M12/7, which was a regular win in the same category at the time. The cylinder block is an 80 degrees V6 made of cast iron.

Based on this engine, the turbocharged Formula 1 engine, dubbed the RA163E, was developed with the stroke reduced from 52.3mm to 39.2mm.

The RA260E of the F2 engine is a number of minor changes such as 2 of F2 and 6 of V6, and the single-digit value of the 1980s is reflected in the engine model name. As an example, in 1981, the fuel injection manufacturer was changed to RA261E.

== Specs ==
- Engine type: Water-cooled V-type 6-cylinder DOHC 24-valve naturally-aspirated
- Bank angle: 80°
- Total displacement: 1,996.3 cc (121.82 cu in)
- Bore x Stroke: 90 mm (3.5 in) x 52.3 mm (2.06 in)
- Compression ratio: Not disclosed
- Maximum output: > 310 hp @ 10,500 rpm
- Weight: 125 kg (276 lb)

== Development history ==
Kawamoto personally started drawing racing engines for F2 in 1977 in order to inherit the engine technology that Honda had cultivated since the first F1 entry. At the end of the year, when Honda got OK, he started designing with a few young people.

At that time, the in-line 4-cylinder BMW M12 / 7 was overwhelmingly strong in F2, so the goal was to overcome this, and unlike the conventional Honda engine for F1, which had been difficult, the number of revolutions was increased. The design was made with the goal of producing horsepower. The conventional Honda engine has the concept of squeezing horsepower at high rpm, and since it was at a high limit, it is severe in all aspects such as price, work accuracy, materials, and sacrifices serviceability and usability. rice field. Therefore, it was intended to have a margin for the number of revolutions (maximum number of revolutions was suppressed to 12000 rpm) so that the conventional drawbacks would not occur, maintenance was easy, and it was easy for each team of the supply destination to handle.

While BMW prioritized medium to high-speed torque with a long stroke of in-line 4-cylinder, Honda repeatedly examined the number of cylinders with 4, 6, and 8 cylinders, but 6 cylinders because 8 cylinders are too many. If there are 6 cylinders in series, the total length of the engine will be long, so I chose a V-type 6-cylinder engine that arranges 3 cylinders in a V-type.

It is said that the pent-roof combustion chamber was developed by Keith Duckworth of Cosworth with the FVA of the 1600cc F2 engine, but before the FVA, Honda had already adopted it in its racing engine and raced. He participated in the race and achieved good results. However, this engine was not commercially available as a Honda-only engine, so even if it achieved good results in the race, its contents were not disclosed to the outside of Honda.

On the other hand, since FVA was marketed to participants in F2 races, it was possible to obtain FVA and copy its combustion chamber shape, gear train, etc. and reflect it in its own racing engine. In particular, FVA uses the cylinder block of mass-produced cars, so it is highly versatile in design and easy to copy and use, and became the basis of the basic design of racing engines after FVA.

FVA's pent-roof combustion chamber uses a gear train with four intake and exhaust valves installed to make the valve pinch angle narrower than 40 degrees, and a large number of small-diameter gears when using a gear drive to drive the valves. The pattern was the basis of the racing engine at the time.

Kawamoto avoids the shackles of mass production, determines the bore x stroke and combustion chamber shape, outputs even in the low rotation range, and as an engine that can increase the rotation to 12000 rpm with a margin, the valve pinch angle is better than Duckworth. The combustion efficiency has been improved by setting the angle between the valves.

For the valve drive, a rocker arm was placed to secure a lift larger than the cam lift. Furthermore, the valve was driven by a gear drive, but the combination of three gears suppressed the occurrence of timing deviation.

Since 1979, F2 has introduced the wing car that was already popular in F1. Kawamoto chose Ralt, which had been associated with Honda in the past, as the chassis to be mounted on Honda, consulted with the designer Ron Toorak in 1979, and considered installing the Honda V6 engine on the Ralt RT2 chassis that was competing in the same year. As a wing car compatible, we received orders from Ralt to "mount the engine with a rigid mount " and "mount the exhaust pipe as high as possible and cut down the engine width as much as possible".

In particular, Honda changed the bank angle of the V6 engine to 80 degrees and at the same time changed the design of the mount part for rigid mounting in order to narrow the engine width, which was an essential condition for mounting on a wing car.

For fuel supply, Lucas ' mechanical fuel injection was adopted.

In 1980, the Honda engine was installed in the Ralt RH6 and started participating in the European F2 Championship in the middle of the season. Geoff Lees and Nigel Mansell were appointed as drivers.

== Series development ==
Honda entered the F2 series by improving the engine every season until the final year of F2 and supplying it to a small number of teams instead of supplying it to many teams like BMW. The development goal was to commercialize the engine to teams that wanted it, but it could not be commercialized because the Fédération Internationale de l'Automobile (FIA) did not tell F2 that the series would continue to be held in the future.

=== RA261E ===
Engine for the 1981 season.

For the engine of the previous year, "change the shape of the head cover", "change the fuel injection from Lucas to Bosch ", and "change the shape of the combustion chamber" were implemented.

In Europe, Geoff Lees and Mike Thackwell participated in the Ralt RH6. In Japan (All-Japan F2 Championship), Satoru Nakajima from Tetsu Ikuzawa's I&I Racing participated in Ralt RH6 and March 812.

=== RA262E ===
Engine for the 1982 season.

The head, fail cam, and ignition system was improved to improve the torque in the middle-speed range and to improve the corner rise acceleration.

Honda had begun full-scale development of the V6 turbo engine for F1 toward the next year, so the F2 engine began to be developed and manufactured with the cooperation of MUGEN (currently M-TEC ).

In Europe, a new Spirit Racing was established with Honda's investment, and its leaders were composed of Kawamoto scouting from March Engineering. Stefan Johansson and Thierry Boutsen are new Honda users at Spirit 201. This spirit project served as a stepping stone to Honda Engine's second F1 entry. Boutsen ranked 3rd in the series ranking and Honda's top.

On the other hand, Kenny Acheson and Jonathan Palmer, the F3 champion of the previous year, participated in the Ralt RH6-82 from Ralt, which is the third year of participation with Honda. Since the Honda-equipped team is no longer limited to Ralt, we prepared 10 engines for Europe and performed maintenance with the cooperation of Judd. Judd will develop and manufacture a V8 engine based on the RA262E of this V6 with permission from Honda. Later, Honda will develop an engine for F3000 (later Mugen, MF308 ) based on this V8 engine developed by Judd.

In Japan, Nakajima participated in March 822 from I&I Racing. Nakajima and I&I also made an expedition to Europe and took second place on the podium at the opening Silverstone Circuit.

=== RA263E ===
Engine for the 1983 series.

Since a new chicane was installed at the final corner of the Suzuka Circuit from this year, we aimed to increase the torque in the mid-low range and improved the growth at high speeds and the pickup at the start of the corner.

In Europe, Jonathan Palmer and Mike Thackwell from Ralt will be competing. Palmer won the championship, and Thackwell continued in second place in the series to dominate the season. Since Spirit has started to participate in F1, there are only two Honda users in European F2, Ralt.

In Japan, Geoff Lees, who participated from Team Ikuzawa, won the series championship. In addition, Nakajima left Ikusawa and transferred to Harada Racing, so it was supplied not only to Team Ikuzawa but also to Harada Racing.

=== RA264E ===
Engine for the 1984 series.

In Europe, Mike Thackwell and Roberto Moreno from Ralt will participate. Thackwell won the series championship, and Moreno also took second place in the ranking. The final year of European F2 was overwhelming.

In Japan, Nakajima transferred to Heros Racing, so two teams, Dave Scott and Heroes of Team Ikuzawa, were supplied. Nakajima won the series championship.

=== RA265E ===
Engine for the 1985 series.

From this year, the European F2 Championship has shifted to the F3000 Championship, so F2 will be the only All Japan Championship, and All Japan will continue with F2 regulation for the next two years. Since it was a championship only in Japan, some of the machine regulations and engine regulations were changed. Flat bottom regulations and noise regulations unique to Japan have been applied. The exhaust volume regulation measures the volume at 75% of the maximum engine speed, and it was stipulated that it should be 120 dB or less in 1985 and 115 dB or less in 1986.

The RA264E recorded 128 dB as measured by the Japan Automobile Federation (JAF), so it was decided to wear a JAF-certified muffler to participate in the race. This muffler was attached to the end of the two exhaust pipes. The basic structure is to make a large number of holes with a diameter of about 5 mm from the tip of the conventional exhaust pipe to the entire circumference of 30 cm in length, wrap the circumference with asbestos, and wrap the asbestos in a pipe with a large diameter. There is. At this part, the pipe diameter is increased to reduce the exhaust pressure, and asbestos is used to absorb it. With this shape, it is possible to maintain the same dimensions as the inner diameter of the conventional pipe, and it became a silencer that can reduce the volume while avoiding the increase in size.

Since BMW reduced the engine supply with the developmental end of European F2, in Japan, besides Ikusawa and Nakajima, Hoshino Racing, who was a BMW user until then, also overthrew and hoped for the same Honda engine aiming for Nakajima, Honda from this year Became a user. Nakajima won the championship for the second consecutive year. And on the engine side, F2, which was a confrontation composition between Honda and BMW, will be fighting with the newly entered Yamaha OX66.

=== RA266E ===
Engine for the 1986 series. With this engine, the development of Honda's F2 engine will end. The shape and contents of the muffler have been changed to comply with the stricter exhaust volume regulations than in 1985.

In the race, although he allowed the OX66 to win the opening three consecutive wins, he introduced electronic control from the middle of the season and regained his advantage. Nakajima won the championship for the third consecutive year.

From the following year, the Japanese F2 Championship will be changed to the All-Japan F3000 Championship.
