= Ralt RH6 =

Open-wheel formula racing car chassis

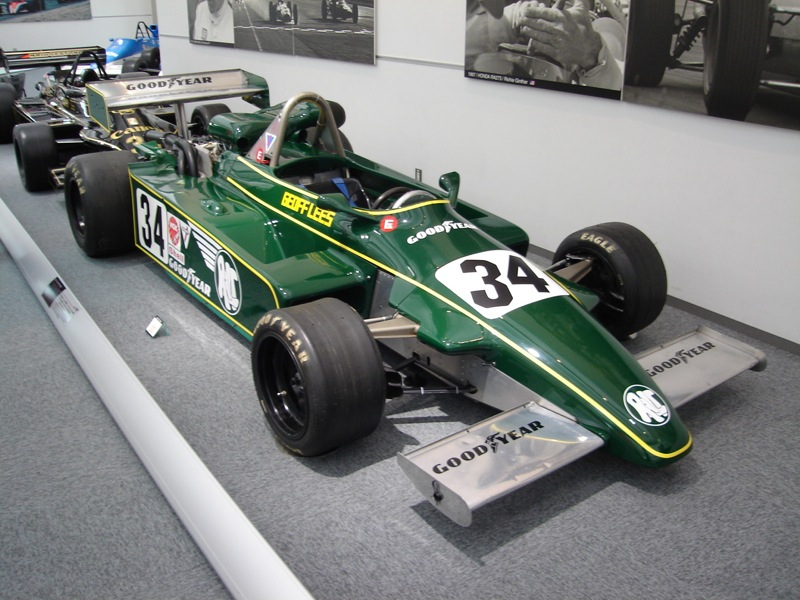
- Category: Formula 2
- Constructor: Ralt
- Designer(s): Ron Tauranac

Technical specifications
- Chassis: Aluminum stressed monocoque
- Suspension (front): Rocker arm and triangulated bottom wishbone
- Suspension (rear): Wishbones (top and bottom), KONI shock absorbers, anti-roll bar
- Axle track: 1,456 mm (57.3 in) (front); 1,374 mm (54.1 in) (rear)
- Wheelbase: 2,482–2,540 mm (97.7–100.0 in)
- Engine: Mid-engine, longitudinally mounted, Honda RA260E, 2.0 L (122.0 cu in), 80° V6, NA
- Transmission: Hewland FT-200 5-speed manual
- Power: ~ 310 hp (231 kW)
- Weight: 515 kg (1,135 lb)
- Tyres: Goodyear

Competition history
- Debut: 1980

The Ralt RH6 is an open-wheel formula racing car chassis, designed, developed and built by Australian constructor and manufacturer Ralt, for Formula Two racing categories, in 1980. It saw continued use in motor racing through 1984.

== History ==
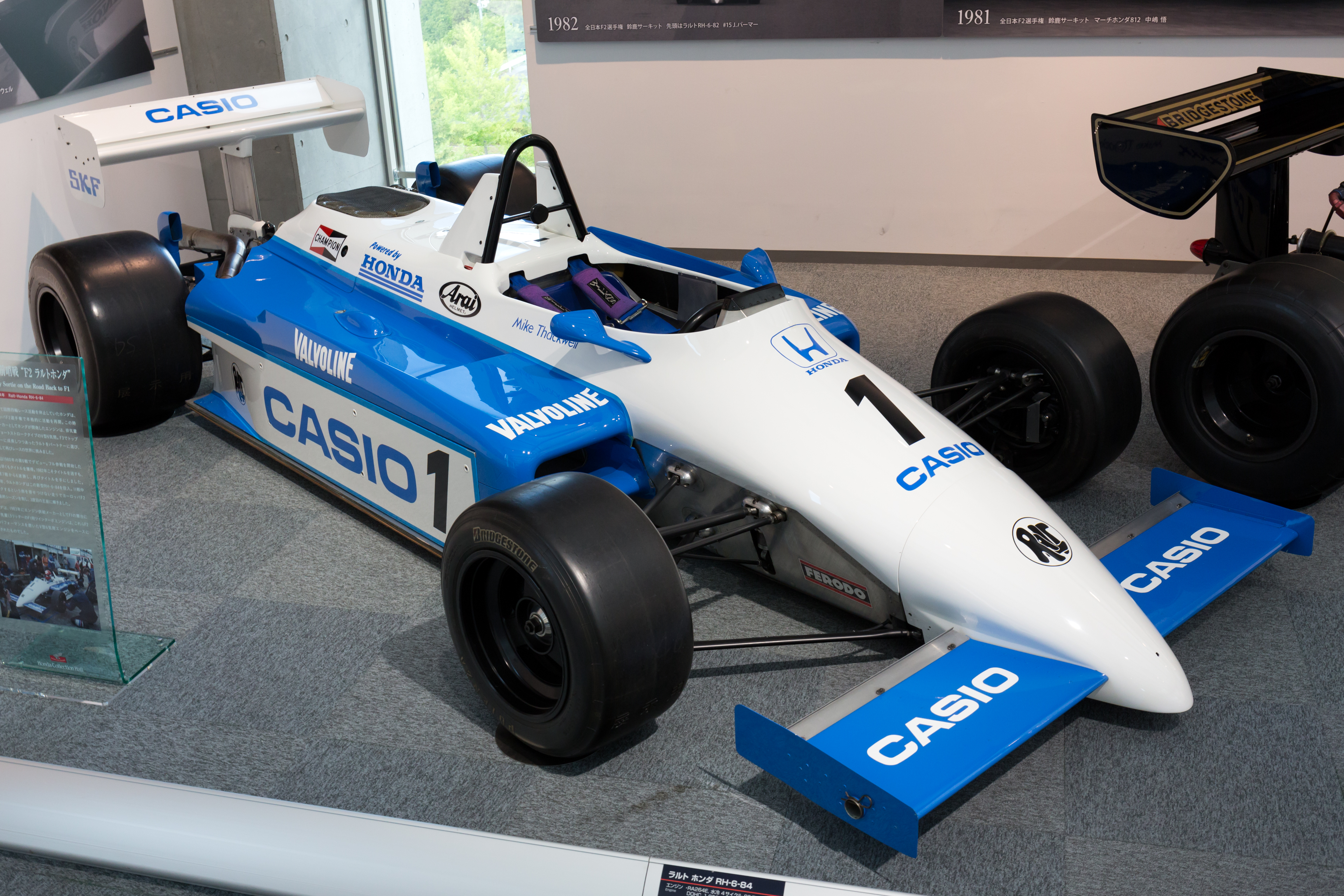
1984 Ralt RH6/84 Formula 2 car

In 1980, Honda asked John Judd's Engine Developments to develop an engine for Formula Two, which would be used by the works Ralt team. Tauranac had previously been associated with Honda through Brabham's introduction of the Japanese marque to F2 in the 1960s, while Jack Brabham had co-founded Engine Developments with Judd. Between 1980 and 1984, Ralt's works F2 cars carried the RH6 designation: the RH6/80 and RH6/81 were developments of the RT2 theme, while the RH6/82, RH6/83 and RH6/84 were further developed around a new honeycomb tub. The cars proved very successful, winning 20 championship races and the 1981, 1983 and 1984 championships with Geoff Lees, Jonathan Palmer and Mike Thackwell respectively.
