= 2012 SUGO GT 300km =

Race held in 2012

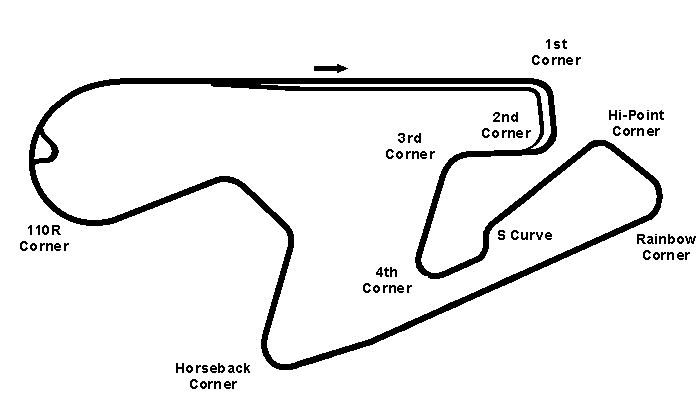
Layout of the Sugo

The 2012 SUGO GT 300km was the fourth round of the 2012 Super GT season. It took place on July 29, 2012.

== Race results ==
Pos	No	Team	Drivers	Chassis	Tyre	Time/Difference	Laps
GT500
1	6	Lexus Team ENEOS LeMans	(Japan) Daisuke Ito (Japan) Kazuya Oshima	Lexus SC430	B	1:48:37.179	81
2	36	Lexus Team Petronas TOM'S	(Japan) Kazuki Nakajima (France) Loïc Duval	Lexus SC430	B	+0.626	81
3	1	S-Road REITO MOLA	(Japan) Masataka Yanagida (Italy) Ronnie Quintarelli	Nissan GT-R	MI	+13.051	81
4	39	Lexus Team DENSO SARD	(Japan) Hiroaki Ishiura (Japan) Juichi Wakisaka	Lexus SC430	MI	+21.059	81
5	38	Lexus Team ZENT Cerumo	(Japan) Yuji Tachikawa (Japan) Kohei Hirate	Lexus SC430	B	+23.456	81
6	35	Lexus Team KeePer Kraft	(Japan) Yuji Kunimoto (Italy) Andrea Caldarelli	Lexus SC430	B	+54.682	81
7	18	Weider Honda Racing	(Japan) Takashi Kogure (Netherlands) Carlo van Dam	Honda HSV-010 GT	B	+55.620	81
8	100	Raybrig Team Kunimitsu	(Japan) Takuya Izawa (Japan) Naoki Yamamoto	Honda HSV-010 GT	B	+1:00.053	81
9	17	Keihin Real Racing	(Japan) Toshihiro Kaneishi (Japan) Koudai Tsukakoshi	Honda HSV-010 GT	B	+1:06.380	81
10	24	D'Station ADVAN Kondo Racing	(Japan) Hironobu Yasuda (Sweden) Björn Wirdheim	Nissan GT-R	Y	+1 Lap	80
11	32	EPSON Nakajima Racing	(Japan) Ryo Michigami (Japan) Yuhki Nakayama	Honda HSV-010 GT	D	+1 Lap	80
12	19	Lexus Team WedsSport Bandoh	(Japan) Seiji Ara (Portugal) Andre Couto	Lexus SC430	Y	+6 Laps	75
DNF	8	Autobacs Racing Team Aguri	(Japan) Takashi Kobayashi (Republic of Ireland) Ralph Firman	Honda HSV-010 GT	B	+48 Laps	33
DNF	12	Calsonic Team Impul	(Japan) Tsugio Matsuda (Brazil) João Paulo de Oliveira	Nissan GT-R	B	+81 Laps	0
DNF	23	Motul Autech NISMO	(Japan) Satoshi Motoyama (Germany) Michael Krumm	Nissan GT-R	B	+81 Laps	0
GT300
1	3	S-Road NDDP	(Japan) Katsumasa Chiyo (Japan) Yuhi Sekiguchi	Nissan GT-R GT3	Y	1:49:04.082	75
2	52	Green Tec & Leon with Shift	(Japan) Haruki Kurosawa (Japan) Hironori Takeuchi	Mercedes-Benz SLS AMG GT3	Y	+31.087	75
3	88	MonePa JLOC	(Japan) Manabu Orido (Japan) Takayuki Aoki	Lamborghini Gallardo GT3	Y	+38.962	75
4	33	Hankook KTR	(Japan) Masami Kageyama (Japan) Tomonobu Fujii	Porsche 911 GT3-R	HK	+39.788	75
5	911	Team Taisan ENDLESS	(Japan) Kyosuke Mineo (Japan) Naoki Yokomizo	Porsche 911 GT3-R	Y	+50.966	75
6	11	Gainer	(Japan) Tetsuya Tanaka (Japan) Katsuyuki Hiranaka	Audi R8 LMS ultra	D	+57.998	75
7	0	GSR Hatsune Miku	(Japan) Nobuteru Taniguchi (Japan) Tatsuya Kataoka	BMW Z4 GT3	Y	+58.346	75
8	31	Hasepro apr	(Japan) Koki Saga (Japan) Morio Nitta	Toyota Prius	Y	+1 Lap	74
9	43	Autobacs Racing Team Aguri	(Japan) Kosuke Matsuura (Japan) Shinichi Takagi	ASL Garaiya	B	+1 Lap	74
10	61	R&D Sport	(Japan) Tetsuya Yamano (Japan) Kota Sasaki	Subaru BRZ	Y	+1 Lap	74
11	4	GSR Project Mirai	(Japan) Taku Bamba (Japan) Masahiro Sasaki	BMW Z4 GT3	Y	+1 Lap	74
12	5	Team Mach	(Japan) Masayuki Ueda (Japan) Tetsuji Tamanaka	Ferrari 458 Italia GT3	Y	+1 Lap	74
13	14	Team SGC	(Japan) Ryo Orime (Switzerland) Alexandre Imperatori	Lexus IS350	Y	+2 Laps	73
14	30	Iwasaki Moda apr	(Japan) Yuki Iwasaki (Japan) Yuya Sakamoto	Audi R8 LMS ultra	Y	+2 Laps	73
15	86	Verity BOMEX JLOC	(Japan) Hideshi Matsuda (Japan) Junichiro Yamashita	Lamborghini Gallardo RG-3	Y	+3 Laps	72
16	16	Team Mugen	(Japan) Hideki Mutoh (Japan) Daisuke Nakajima	Honda CR-Z	B	+3 Laps	72
17	360	RunUp Tomei Sports	(Japan) Atsushi Tanaka (Japan) Takuya Shirasaka	Callaway Corvette Z06.R GT3	Y	+7 Laps	68
18	27	NAC Ika Musume LMP Motorsport	(Japan) Takuto Iguchi (Japan) Yutaka Yamagishi	Ferrari F430 GTC	Y	+7 Laps	68
19	87	JLOC	(Japan) Hideki Yamauchi (Japan) Koji Yamanishi	Lamborghini Gallardo GT3	Y	+15 Laps	60
20	48	NEON Dijon Racing	(Japan) Shogo Mitsuyama (Japan) Hiroshi Takamori	Callaway Corvette Z06.R GT3	Y	+19 Laps	56
DNF	21	ZENT Hitotsuyama Racing	(Japan) Akihiro Tsuzuki (Switzerland) Cyndie Allemann	Audi R8 LMS	Y	+46 Laps	29
DNF	2	Evangelion-01 Cars Tokai Dream28	(Japan) Kazuho Takahashi (Japan) Hiroki Kato	Mooncraft Shiden	Y	+59 Laps	16
DNF	66	A speed	(Japan) Hiroki Yoshimoto (Japan) Kazuki Hoshino	Aston Martin V12 Vantage GT3	Y	+73 Laps	2
DNQ	22	R'Qs Motorsports	(Japan) Masaki Jyonai (Japan) Hisashi Wada	Vemac RD350R	Y		
DNQ	99	Racerbook Hitotsuyama Racing	(Japan) Hideto Yasuoka (United States) Michael Kim	Audi R8 LMS	Y		
