= 2012 Autopolis GT 300km =

7th round of the 2012 Super GT season

Layout of the Autopolis

The 2012 Autopolis GT 300km was the seventh round of the 2012 Super GT season. It took place on September 30, 2012.

== Race results ==
Pos	No	Team	Drivers	Chassis	Tyre	Time/Difference	Laps
GT500
1	1	S-Road REITO MOLA	(Japan) Masataka Yanagida (Italy) Ronnie Quintarelli	Nissan GT-R	MI	2:09:45.269	65
2	32	EPSON Nakajima Racing	(Japan) Ryo Michigami (Japan) Yuhki Nakayama	Honda HSV-010 GT	D	+7.581	65
3	19	Lexus Team WedsSport Bandoh	(Japan) Seiji Ara (Portugal) Andre Couto	Lexus SC430	Y	+31.747	65
4	24	D'Station ADVAN Kondo Racing	(Japan) Hironobu Yasuda (Sweden) Björn Wirdheim	Nissan GT-R	Y	+35.489	65
5	39	Lexus Team DENSO SARD	(Japan) Hiroaki Ishiura (Japan) Juichi Wakisaka	Lexus SC430	MI	+1:45.603	65
6	23	Motul Autech NISMO	(Japan) Satoshi Motoyama (Germany) Michael Krumm	Nissan GT-R	B	+1:47.611	65
7	38	Lexus Team ZENT Cerumo	(Japan) Yuji Tachikawa (Japan) Kohei Hirate	Lexus SC430	B	+1:49.213	65
8	100	Raybrig Team Kunimitsu	(Japan) Takuya Izawa (Japan) Naoki Yamamoto	Honda HSV-010 GT	B	+1 Lap	64
9	18	Weider Honda Racing	(Japan) Takashi Kogure (Netherlands) Carlo van Dam	Honda HSV-010 GT	B	+1 Lap	64
10	12	Calsonic Team Impul	(Japan) Tsugio Matsuda (Brazil) João Paulo de Oliveira	Nissan GT-R	B	+1 Lap	64
11	8	Autobacs Racing Team Aguri	(Japan) Takashi Kobayashi (Republic of Ireland) Ralph Firman	Honda HSV-010 GT	B	+1 Lap	64
12	6	Lexus Team ENEOS LeMans	(Japan) Daisuke Ito (Japan) Kazuya Oshima	Lexus SC430	B	+1 Lap	64
13	35	Lexus Team KeePer Kraft	(Japan) Yuji Kunimoto (Italy) Andrea Caldarelli	Lexus SC430	B	+1 Lap	64
14	17	Keihin Real Racing	(Japan) Toshihiro Kaneishi (Japan) Koudai Tsukakoshi	Honda HSV-010 GT	B	+2 Laps	63
15	36	Lexus Team Petronas TOM'S	(Japan) Kazuki Nakajima (France) Loïc Duval	Lexus SC430	B	+2 Laps	63
GT300
1	66	A speed	(Japan) Hiroki Yoshimoto (Japan) Kazuki Hoshino	Aston Martin V12 Vantage GT3	Y	2:11:03.136	62
2	911	Team Taisan ENDLESS	(Japan) Kyosuke Mineo (Japan) Naoki Yokomizo	Porsche 911 GT3-R	Y	+13.550	62
3	33	Hankook KTR	(Japan) Masami Kageyama (Japan) Tomonobu Fujii	Porsche 911 GT3-R	HK	+36.494	62
4	61	R&D Sport	(Japan) Tetsuya Yamano (Japan) Kota Sasaki	Subaru BRZ	Y	+39.654	62
5	0	GSR Hatsune Miku	(Japan) Nobuteru Taniguchi (Japan) Tatsuya Kataoka	BMW Z4 GT3	Y	+1 Lap	61
6	21	ZENT Hitotsuyama Racing	(Japan) Akihiro Tsuzuki (United Kingdom) Richard Lyons	Audi R8 LMS	Y	+1 Lap	61
7	88	MonePa JLOC	(Japan) Manabu Orido (Japan) Takayuki Aoki	Lamborghini Gallardo GT3	Y	+1 Lap	61
8	31	Hasepro apr	(Japan) Koki Saga (Japan) Morio Nitta	Toyota Prius	Y	+1 Lap	61
9	27	NAC Ika Musume LMP Motorsport	(Japan) Takuto Iguchi (Japan) Yutaka Yamagishi	Ferrari F430 GTC	Y	+1 Lap	61
10	16	Team Mugen	(Japan) Hideki Mutoh (Japan) Daisuke Nakajima	Honda CR-Z	B	+1 Lap	61
11	5	Team Mach	(Japan) Masayuki Ueda (Japan) Tetsuji Tamanaka	Ferrari 458 Italia GT3	Y	+1 Lap	61
12	4	GSR Project Mirai	(Japan) Taku Bamba (Japan) Masahiro Sasaki	BMW Z4 GT3	Y	+1 Lap	61
13	14	Team SGC	(Japan) Ryo Orime (Japan) Naoya Yamano	Lexus IS350	Y	+1 Lap	61
14	30	Iwasaki Moda apr	(Japan) Yuki Iwasaki (Japan) Yuya Sakamoto	Audi R8 LMS ultra	Y	+2 Laps	60
15	85	JLOC	(Japan) Yuya Sakamoto (Japan) Hideshi Matsuda	Lamborghini Gallardo RG-3	Y	+2 Laps	60
16	11	Gainer	(Japan) Tetsuya Tanaka (Japan) Katsuyuki Hiranaka	Audi R8 LMS ultra	D	+2 Laps	60
17	43	Autobacs Racing Team Aguri	(Japan) Kosuke Matsuura (Japan) Shinichi Takagi	ASL Garaiya	B	+3 Laps	59
18	22	R'Qs Motorsports	(Japan) Masaki Jyonai (Japan) Hisashi Wada	Vemac RD350R	Y	+4 Laps	58
19	3	S-Road NDDP	(Japan) Katsumasa Chiyo (Japan) Yuhi Sekiguchi	Nissan GT-R GT3	Y	+8 Laps	54
20	360	RunUp Tomei Sports	(Japan) Atsushi Tanaka (Japan) Takuya Shirasaka	Callaway Corvette Z06.R GT3	Y	+9 Laps	53
DNF	99	Racerbook Hitotsuyama Racing	(Japan) Hideto Yasuoka (Hong Kong) Frank Yu	Audi R8 LMS	Y	+20 Laps	42
DNF	87	JLOC	(Japan) Hideki Yamauchi (Japan) Koji Yamanishi	Lamborghini Gallardo GT3	Y	+36 Laps	26
DNF	52	Green Tec & Leon with Shift	(Japan) Haruki Kurosawa (Japan) Hironori Takeuchi	Mercedes-Benz SLS AMG GT3	Y	+52 Laps	10
DNQ	2	Evangelion-01 Cars Tokai Dream28	(Japan) Kazuho Takahashi (Japan) Hiroki Kato	Mooncraft Shiden	Y		
