= 2012 Fuji GT 500km =

Track map of the Fuji Speedway

The 2012 Fuji GT 500km was the second round of the 2012 Super GT season. It took place on May 4, 2012.

== Race results ==
Pos	No	Team	Drivers	Chassis	Tyre	Time/Difference	Laps
GT500
1	39	Lexus Team DENSO SARD	(Japan) Hiroaki Ishiura (Japan) Juichi Wakisaka	Lexus SC430	MI	3:21:14.137	110
2	100	Raybrig Team Kunimitsu	(Japan) Takuya Izawa (Japan) Naoki Yamamoto	Honda HSV-010 GT	B	+12.055	110
3	23	Motul Autech NISMO	(Japan) Satoshi Motoyama (Germany) Michael Krumm	Nissan GT-R	B	+32.107	110
4	36	Lexus Team Petronas TOM'S	(Japan) Kazuki Nakajima (United Kingdom) Richard Lyons	Lexus SC430	B	+35.301	110
5	12	Calsonic Team Impul	(Japan) Tsugio Matsuda (Brazil) João Paulo de Oliveira	Nissan GT-R	B	+49.111	110
6	17	Keihin Real Racing	(Japan) Toshihiro Kaneishi (Japan) Koudai Tsukakoshi	Honda HSV-010 GT	B	+1:00.738	110
7	1	S-Road REITO MOLA	(Japan) Masataka Yanagida (Italy) Ronnie Quintarelli	Nissan GT-R	MI	+1:24.046	110
8	38	Lexus Team ZENT Cerumo	(Japan) Yuji Tachikawa (Japan) Kohei Hirate	Lexus SC430	B	+1 Lap	109
9	18	Weider Honda Racing	(Japan) Takashi Kogure (Netherlands) Carlo van Dam	Honda HSV-010 GT	B	+1 Lap	109
10	6	Lexus Team ENEOS LeMans	(Japan) Daisuke Ito (Japan) Kazuya Oshima	Lexus SC430	B	+1 Lap	109
11	32	EPSON Nakajima Racing	(Japan) Ryo Michigami (Japan) Yuhki Nakayama	Honda HSV-010 GT	D	+1 Lap	109
12	35	Lexus Team KeePer Kraft	(Japan) Yuji Kunimoto (Italy) Andrea Caldarelli	Lexus SC430	B	+2 Laps	108
13	19	Lexus Team WedsSport Bandoh	(Japan) Seiji Ara (Portugal) Andre Couto	Lexus SC430	Y	+3 Laps	107
14	24	D'Station ADVAN Kondo Racing	(Japan) Hironobu Yasuda (Sweden) Björn Wirdheim	Nissan GT-R	Y	+12 Laps	98
DNF	8	Autobacs Racing Team Aguri	(Japan) Takashi Kobayashi (Republic of Ireland) Ralph Firman	Honda HSV-010 GT	B	+105 Laps	5
GT300
1	0	GSR Hatsune Miku	(Japan) Nobuteru Taniguchi (Japan) Tatsuya Kataoka	BMW Z4 GT3	Y	3:21:52.575	104
2	2	Evangelion-01 Cars Tokai Dream28	(Japan) Kazuho Takahashi (Japan) Hiroki Kato	Mooncraft Shiden	Y	+15.761	104
3	66	A speed	(Japan) Hiroki Yoshimoto (Japan) Kazuki Hoshino	Aston Martin V12 Vantage GT3	Y	+17.259	104
4	43	Autobacs Racing Team Aguri	(Japan) Kosuke Matsuura (Japan) Shinichi Takagi	ASL Garaiya	B	+39.251	104
5	11	Gainer	(Japan) Tetsuya Tanaka (Japan) Katsuyuki Hiranaka	Audi R8 LMS ultra	D	+1 Lap	103
6	31	Hasepro apr	(Japan) Koki Saga (Japan) Morio Nitta	Toyota Prius	Y	+1 Lap	103
7	87	JLOC	(Japan) Hideki Yamauchi (Japan) Koji Yamanishi	Lamborghini Gallardo GT3	Y	+1 Lap	103
8	911	Team Taisan ENDLESS	(Japan) Kyosuke Mineo (Japan) Naoki Yokomizo	Porsche 911 GT3-R	Y	+1 Lap	103
9	61	R&D Sport	(Japan) Tetsuya Yamano (Japan) Kota Sasaki	Subaru BRZ	Y	+2 Laps	102
10	52	Green Tec & Leon with Shift	(Japan) Haruki Kurosawa (Japan) Hironori Takeuchi	Mercedes-Benz SLS AMG GT3	Y	+2 Laps	102
11	4	GSR Project Mirai	(Japan) Taku Bamba (Japan) Masahiro Sasaki	BMW Z4 GT3	Y	+2 Laps	102
12	22	R'Qs Motorsports	(Japan) Masaki Jyonai (Japan) Hisashi Wada	Vemac RD350R	Y	+3 Laps	101
13	30	Iwasaki Moda apr	(Japan) Yuki Iwasaki (Japan) Yuya Sakamoto	Audi R8 LMS ultra	Y	+4 Laps	100
14	86	Verity BOMEX JLOC	(Japan) Hideshi Matsuda (Japan) Junichiro Yamashita	Lamborghini Gallardo RG-3	Y	+4 Laps	100
15	21	ZENT Hitotsuyama Racing	(Japan) Akihiro Tsuzuki (Switzerland) Cyndie Allemann (Japan) Yukinori Taniguchi	Audi R8 LMS	Y	+4 Laps	100
16	20	Racerbook Hitotsuyama Racing	(Japan) Hideki Noda (Hong Kong) Frank Yu (Japan) Kenji Kobayashi	Audi R8 LMS	Y	+5 Laps	99
17	27	NAC Ika Musume LMP Motorsport	(Japan) Takuto Iguchi (Japan) Yutaka Yamagishi	Ferrari F430 GTC	Y	+6 Laps	98
18	3	S-Road NDDP	(Japan) Katsumasa Chiyo (Japan) Yuhi Sekiguchi	Nissan GT-R GT3	Y	+18 Laps	86
DNF	88	MonePa JLOC	(Japan) Manabu Orido (Japan) Takayuki Aoki	Lamborghini Gallardo GT3	Y	+43 Laps	61
DNF	15	Team Art Taste	(Japan) Takeshi Tsuchiya (Germany) Tim Bergmeister (Germany) Jörg Bergmeister	Porsche 911 GT3-R	Y	+46 Laps	58
DNF	85	JLOC	(Japan) Yuya Sakamoto (Japan) Masaki Kano (Japan) Ryohei Sakaguchi	Lamborghini Gallardo RG-3	Y	+52 Laps	52
DNF	33	Hankook KTR	(Japan) Masami Kageyama (Japan) Tomonobu Fujii	Porsche 911 GT3-R	HK	+74 Laps	30
DNF	360	RunUp Tomei Sports	(Japan) Atsushi Tanaka (Japan) Takuya Shirasaka	Callaway Corvette Z06.R GT3	Y	+88 Laps	16
DNF	48	NEON Dijon Racing	(Japan) Shogo Mitsuyama (Japan) Hiroshi Takamori (Japan) Keiichi Inoue	Callaway Corvette Z06.R GT3	Y	+101 Laps	2
DNQ	5	Team Mach	(Japan) Masayuki Ueda (Japan) Tetsuji Tamanaka (Japan) Masataka Kawaguchi	Ferrari 458 Italia GT3	Y		0
