= 2012 Fuji GT 300km =

Track map of the Fuji Speedway

The 2012 Fuji GT 300km was the sixth round of the 2012 Super GT season. It took place on September 9, 2012.

== Race results ==
Pos	No	Team	Drivers	Chassis	Tyre	Time/Difference	Laps
GT500
1	12	Calsonic Team Impul	(Japan) Tsugio Matsuda (Brazil) João Paulo de Oliveira	Nissan GT-R	B	1:47:22.021	66
2	1	S-Road REITO MOLA	(Japan) Masataka Yanagida (Italy) Ronnie Quintarelli	Nissan GT-R	MI	+21.025	66
3	19	Lexus Team WedsSport Bandoh	(Japan) Seiji Ara (Portugal) Andre Couto	Lexus SC430	Y	+23.959	66
4	36	Lexus Team Petronas TOM'S	(Japan) Kazuki Nakajima (France) Loïc Duval	Lexus SC430	B	+24.511	66
5	17	Keihin Real Racing	(Japan) Toshihiro Kaneishi (Japan) Koudai Tsukakoshi	Honda HSV-010 GT	B	+40.800	66
6	39	Lexus Team DENSO SARD	(Japan) Hiroaki Ishiura (Japan) Juichi Wakisaka	Lexus SC430	MI	+51.956	66
7	35	Lexus Team KeePer Kraft	(Japan) Yuji Kunimoto (Italy) Andrea Caldarelli	Lexus SC430	B	+52.884	66
8	38	Lexus Team ZENT Cerumo	(Japan) Yuji Tachikawa (Japan) Kohei Hirate	Lexus SC430	B	+58.590	66
9	8	Autobacs Racing Team Aguri	(Japan) Takashi Kobayashi (Republic of Ireland) Ralph Firman	Honda HSV-010 GT	B	+1:18.369	66
10	6	Lexus Team ENEOS LeMans	(Japan) Daisuke Ito (Japan) Kazuya Oshima	Lexus SC430	B	+1:28.084	66
11	23	Motul Autech NISMO	(Japan) Satoshi Motoyama (Germany) Michael Krumm	Nissan GT-R	B	+1:34.338	66
12	100	Raybrig Team Kunimitsu	(Japan) Takuya Izawa (Japan) Naoki Yamamoto	Honda HSV-010 GT	B	+1:37.543	66
13	24	D'Station ADVAN Kondo Racing	(Japan) Hironobu Yasuda (Sweden) Björn Wirdheim	Nissan GT-R	Y	+1 Lap	65
14	32	EPSON Nakajima Racing	(Japan) Ryo Michigami (Japan) Yuhki Nakayama	Honda HSV-010 GT	D	+2 Laps	64
DNF	18	Weider Honda Racing	(Japan) Takashi Kogure (Netherlands) Carlo van Dam	Honda HSV-010 GT	B	+40 Laps	26
GT300
1	33	Hankook KTR	(Japan) Masami Kageyama (Japan) Tomonobu Fujii	Porsche 911 GT3-R	HK	1:49:04.228	62
2	31	Hasepro apr	(Japan) Koki Saga (Japan) Morio Nitta	Toyota Prius	Y	+1 Lap	61
3	16	Team Mugen	(Japan) Hideki Mutoh (Japan) Daisuke Nakajima	Honda CR-Z	B	+1 Lap	61
4	911	Team Taisan ENDLESS	(Japan) Kyosuke Mineo (Japan) Naoki Yokomizo	Porsche 911 GT3-R	Y	+1 Lap	61
5	43	Autobacs Racing Team Aguri	(Japan) Kosuke Matsuura (Japan) Shinichi Takagi	ASL Garaiya	B	+1 Lap	61
6	61	R&D Sport	(Japan) Tetsuya Yamano (Japan) Kota Sasaki	Subaru BRZ	Y	+1 Lap	61
7	11	Gainer	(Japan) Tetsuya Tanaka (Japan) Katsuyuki Hiranaka	Audi R8 LMS ultra	D	+1 Lap	61
8	0	GSR Hatsune Miku	(Japan) Nobuteru Taniguchi (Japan) Tatsuya Kataoka	BMW Z4 GT3	Y	+1 Lap	61
9	3	S-Road NDDP	(Japan) Katsumasa Chiyo (Japan) Yuhi Sekiguchi	Nissan GT-R GT3	Y	+1 Lap	61
10	30	Iwasaki Moda apr	(Japan) Yuki Iwasaki (Japan) Yuya Sakamoto	Audi R8 LMS ultra	Y	+1 Lap	61
11	4	GSR Project Mirai	(Japan) Taku Bamba (Japan) Masahiro Sasaki	BMW Z4 GT3	Y	+1 Lap	61
12	14	Team SGC	(Japan) Ryo Orime (Switzerland) Alexandre Imperatori	Lexus IS350	Y	+2 Laps	60
13	2	Evangelion-01 Cars Tokai Dream28	(Japan) Kazuho Takahashi (Japan) Hiroki Kato	Mooncraft Shiden	Y	+2 Laps	60
14	27	NAC Ika Musume LMP Motorsport	(Japan) Takuto Iguchi (Japan) Yutaka Yamagishi	Ferrari F430 GTC	Y	+2 Laps	60
15	48	NEON Dijon Racing	(Japan) Shogo Mitsuyama (Japan) Hiroshi Takamori	Callaway Corvette Z06.R GT3	Y	+2 Laps	60
16	22	R'Qs Motorsports	(Japan) Masaki Jyonai (Japan) Hisashi Wada	Vemac RD350R	Y	+2 Laps	60
17	5	Team Mach	(Japan) Masayuki Ueda (Japan) Tetsuji Tamanaka	Ferrari 458 Italia GT3	Y	+3 Laps	59
18	85	JLOC	(Japan) Yuya Sakamoto (Japan) Masaki Kano	Lamborghini Gallardo RG-3	Y	+4 Laps	58
DNF	66	A speed	(Japan) Hiroki Yoshimoto (Japan) Kazuki Hoshino	Aston Martin V12 Vantage GT3	Y	+20 Laps	42
DNF	21	ZENT Hitotsuyama Racing	(Japan) Akihiro Tsuzuki (United Kingdom) Richard Lyons	Audi R8 LMS	Y	+33 Laps	29
DNF	360	RunUp Tomei Sports	(Japan) Atsushi Tanaka (Japan) Takuya Shirasaka	Callaway Corvette Z06.R GT3	Y	+37 Laps	25
DNF	88	MonePa JLOC	(Japan) Manabu Orido (Japan) Takayuki Aoki	Lamborghini Gallardo GT3	Y	+53 Laps	9
DNF	87	JLOC	(Japan) Hideki Yamauchi (Japan) Koji Yamanishi	Lamborghini Gallardo GT3	Y	+57 Laps	5
DNS	52	Green Tec & Leon with Shift	(Japan) Takeshi Tsuchiya (Japan) Hironori Takeuchi	Mercedes-Benz SLS AMG GT3	Y		
