= 2012 Motegi GT 250km =

Points scoring round in Japanese motorcar championship season

Layout of the Twin Ring Motegi

The 2012 Motegi GT 250km was the eighth and final points scoring round of the 2012 Super GT season. It took place on October 28, 2012.

== Race results ==
Pos	No	Team	Drivers	Chassis	Tyre	Time/Difference	Laps
GT500
1	38	Lexus Team ZENT Cerumo	(Japan) Yuji Tachikawa (Japan) Kohei Hirate	Lexus SC430	B	1:44:17.503	53
2	1	S-Road REITO MOLA	(Japan) Masataka Yanagida (Italy) Ronnie Quintarelli	Nissan GT-R	MI	+0.138	53
3	32	EPSON Nakajima Racing	(Japan) Ryo Michigami (Japan) Yuhki Nakayama	Honda HSV-010 GT	D	+10.450	53
4	39	Lexus Team DENSO SARD	(Japan) Hiroaki Ishiura (Japan) Juichi Wakisaka	Lexus SC430	MI	+24.682	53
5	19	Lexus Team WedsSport Bandoh	(Japan) Seiji Ara (Portugal) Andre Couto	Lexus SC430	Y	+29.570	53
6	23	Motul Autech NISMO	(Japan) Satoshi Motoyama (Germany) Michael Krumm	Nissan GT-R	B	+1:02.600	53
7	18	Weider Honda Racing	(Japan) Takashi Kogure (Netherlands) Carlo van Dam	Honda HSV-010 GT	B	+1:03.547	53
8	36	Lexus Team Petronas TOM'S	(Japan) Kazuki Nakajima (France) Loïc Duval	Lexus SC430	B	+1:10.912	53
9	100	Raybrig Team Kunimitsu	(Japan) Takuya Izawa (Japan) Naoki Yamamoto	Honda HSV-010 GT	B	+1:13.025	53
10	12	Calsonic Team Impul	(Japan) Tsugio Matsuda (Brazil) João Paulo de Oliveira	Nissan GT-R	B	+1:20.210	53
11	24	D'Station ADVAN Kondo Racing	(Japan) Hironobu Yasuda (Sweden) Björn Wirdheim	Nissan GT-R	Y	+1:32.666	53
12	6	Lexus Team ENEOS LeMans	(Japan) Daisuke Ito (Japan) Kazuya Oshima	Lexus SC430	B	+1:33.320	53
13	8	Autobacs Racing Team Aguri	(Japan) Takashi Kobayashi (Republic of Ireland) Ralph Firman	Honda HSV-010 GT	B	+1 Lap	52
DNF	35	Lexus Team KeePer Kraft	(Japan) Yuji Kunimoto (Italy) Andrea Caldarelli	Lexus SC430	B	+28 Laps	25
DNF	17	Keihin Real Racing	(Japan) Toshihiro Kaneishi (Japan) Koudai Tsukakoshi	Honda HSV-010 GT	B	+32 Laps	21
GT300
1	911	Team Taisan ENDLESS	(Japan) Kyosuke Mineo (Japan) Naoki Yokomizo	Porsche 911 GT3-R	Y	1:45:11.563	51
2	87	JLOC	(Japan) Hideki Yamauchi (Japan) Koji Yamanishi	Lamborghini Gallardo GT3	Y	+0.735	51
3	88	MonePa JLOC	(Japan) Manabu Orido (Japan) Takayuki Aoki	Lamborghini Gallardo GT3	Y	+18.549	51
4	0	GSR Hatsune Miku	(Japan) Nobuteru Taniguchi (Japan) Tatsuya Kataoka	BMW Z4 GT3	Y	+21.858	51
5	66	A speed	(Japan) Hiroki Yoshimoto (Japan) Kazuki Hoshino	Aston Martin V12 Vantage GT3	Y	+50.523	51
6	3	S-Road NDDP	(Japan) Katsumasa Chiyo (Japan) Yuhi Sekiguchi	Nissan GT-R GT3	Y	+55.643	51
7	33	Hankook KTR	(Japan) Masami Kageyama (Japan) Tomonobu Fujii	Porsche 911 GT3-R	HK	+1 Lap	50
8	52	Green Tec & Leon with Shift	(Japan) Haruki Kurosawa (Japan) Hironori Takeuchi	Mercedes-Benz SLS AMG GT3	Y	+1 Lap	50
9	21	ZENT Hitotsuyama Racing	(Japan) Akihiro Tsuzuki (United Kingdom) Richard Lyons	Audi R8 LMS	Y	+1 Lap	50
10	30	Iwasaki Moda apr	(Japan) Yuki Iwasaki (Japan) Yuya Sakamoto	Audi R8 LMS ultra	Y	+1 Lap	50
11	16	Team Mugen	(Japan) Hideki Mutoh (Japan) Daisuke Nakajima	Honda CR-Z	B	+1 Lap	50
12	5	Team Mach	(Japan) Masayuki Ueda (Japan) Tetsuji Tamanaka	Ferrari 458 Italia GT3	Y	+1 Lap	50
13	11	Gainer	(Japan) Tetsuya Tanaka (Japan) Katsuyuki Hiranaka	Audi R8 LMS ultra	D	+2 Laps	49
14	27	NAC Ika Musume LMP Motorsport	(Japan) Takuto Iguchi (Japan) Yutaka Yamagishi	Ferrari F430 GTC	Y	+2 Laps	49
15	61	R&D Sport	(Japan) Tetsuya Yamano (Japan) Kota Sasaki	Subaru BRZ	Y	+2 Laps	49
16	2	Evangelion-01 Cars Tokai Dream28	(Japan) Kazuho Takahashi (Japan) Hiroki Kato	Mooncraft Shiden	Y	+3 Laps	48
17	4	GSR Project Mirai	(Japan) Taku Bamba (Japan) Masahiro Sasaki	BMW Z4 GT3	Y	+3 Laps	48
18	77	investors Hitotsuyama Racing	(Ukraine) Igor Sushko (Japan) Kenji Kobayashi	Audi R8 LMS	Y	+5 Laps	46
19	48	NEON Dijon Racing	(Japan) Shogo Mitsuyama (Japan) Hiroshi Takamori	Callaway Corvette Z06.R GT3	Y	+9 Laps	42
20	360	RunUp Tomei Sports	(Japan) Atsushi Tanaka (Japan) Takuya Shirasaka	Callaway Corvette Z06.R GT3	Y	+9 Laps	42
21	43	Autobacs Racing Team Aguri	(Japan) Kosuke Matsuura (Japan) Shinichi Takagi	ASL Garaiya	B	+14 Laps	37
DNF	14	Team SGC	(Japan) Ryo Orime (Japan) Naoya Yamano	Lexus IS350	Y	+34 Laps	17
DNF	31	Hasepro apr	(Japan) Koki Saga (Japan) Morio Nitta	Toyota Prius	Y	+43 Laps	8
