= 2012 Okayama GT 300km =

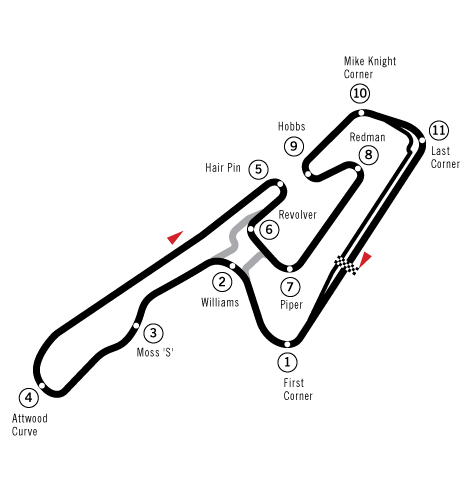
Layout of the Okayama International Circuit

The 2012 Okayama GT 300km was the first round of the 2012 Super GT season. It took place on April 1, 2012.

== Race results ==
Pos	No	Team	Drivers	Chassis	Tyre	Time/Difference	Laps
GT500
1	38	Lexus Team ZENT Cerumo	(Japan) Yuji Tachikawa (Japan) Kohei Hirate	Lexus SC430	B	2:01:21.776	82
2	100	Raybrig Team Kunimitsu	(Japan) Takuya Izawa (Japan) Naoki Yamamoto	Honda HSV-010 GT	B	+0.588	82
3	17	Keihin Real Racing	(Japan) Toshihiro Kaneishi (Japan) Koudai Tsukakoshi	Honda HSV-010 GT	B	+14.826	82
4	23	Motul Autech NISMO	(Japan) Satoshi Motoyama (Germany) Michael Krumm	Nissan GT-R	B	+17.566	82
5	36	Lexus Team Petronas TOM'S	(Japan) Kazuki Nakajima (France) Loïc Duval	Lexus SC430	B	+29.504	82
6	8	Autobacs Racing Team Aguri	(Japan) Takashi Kobayashi (Republic of Ireland) Ralph Firman	Honda HSV-010 GT	B	+32.165	82
7	18	Weider Honda Racing	(Japan) Takashi Kogure (Netherlands) Carlo van Dam	Honda HSV-010 GT	B	+35.062	82
8	1	S-Road REITO MOLA	(Japan) Masataka Yanagida (Italy) Ronnie Quintarelli	Nissan GT-R	M	+36.517	82
9	39	Lexus Team DENSO SARD	(Japan) Hiroaki Ishiura (Japan) Juichi Wakisaka	Lexus SC430	M	+48.736	82
10	12	Calsonic Team Impul	(Japan) Tsugio Matsuda (Brazil) João Paulo de Oliveira	Nissan GT-R	B	+53.262	82
11	24	D'Station ADVAN Kondo Racing	(Japan) Hironobu Yasuda (Sweden) Björn Wirdheim	Nissan GT-R	Y	+1 Lap	81
12	19	Lexus Team WedsSport Bandoh	(Japan) Seiji Ara (Portugal) Andre Couto	Lexus SC430	Y	+1 Lap	81
13	6	Lexus Team ENEOS LeMans	(Japan) Daisuke Ito (Japan) Kazuya Oshima	Lexus SC430	B	+5 Laps	77
DNF	32	EPSON Nakajima Racing	(Japan) Ryo Michigami (Japan) Yuhki Nakayama	Honda HSV-010 GT	D	+41 Laps	41
DNF	35	Lexus Team KeePer Kraft	(Japan) Yuji Kunimoto (Italy) Andrea Caldarelli	Lexus SC430	B	+43 Laps	39
GT300
1	11	Gainer	(Japan) Tetsuya Tanaka (Japan) Katsuyuki Hiranaka	Audi R8 LMS ultra	D	2:02:20.303	78
2	911	Team Taisan ENDLESS	(Japan) Kyosuke Mineo (Japan) Naoki Yokomizo	Porsche 911 GT3-R	Y	+3.766	78
3	0	GSR Hatsune Miku	(Japan) Nobuteru Taniguchi (Japan) Tatsuya Kataoka	BMW Z4 GT3	Y	+1 Lap	77
4	15	Team Art Taste	(Japan) Takeshi Tsuchiya (Germany) Tim Bergmeister	Porsche 911 GT3-R	Y	+1 Lap	77
5	33	Hankook KTR	(Japan) Masami Kageyama (Japan) Tomonobu Fujii	Porsche 911 GT3-R	H	+1 Lap	77
6	43	Autobacs Racing Team Aguri	(Japan) Kosuke Matsuura (Japan) Shinichi Takagi	ASL Garaiya	B	+1 Laps	77
7	2	Evangelion-01 Cars Tokai Dream28	(Japan) Kazuho Takahashi (Japan) Hiroki Kato	Mooncraft Shiden	Y	+2 Laps	76
8	30	Iwasaki Moda apr	(Japan) Yuki Iwasaki (Japan) Yuya Sakamoto	Audi R8 LMS ultra	Y	+2 Laps	76
9	21	ZENT Hitotsuyama Racing	(Japan) Akihiro Tsuzuki (Switzerland) Cyndie Allemann	Audi R8 LMS	Y	+2 Laps	76
10	27	NAC Ika Musume LMP Motorsport	(Japan) Takuto Iguchi (Japan) Yutaka Yamagishi	Ferrari F430 GTC	Y	+2 Laps	76
11	66	A speed	(Japan) Hiroki Yoshimoto (Japan) Kazuki Hoshino	Aston Martin V8 Vantage GT2	Y	+2 Laps	76
12	52	Green Tec & Leon with Shift	(Japan) Haruki Kurosawa (Japan) Hironori Takeuchi	Mercedes-Benz SLS AMG GT3	Y	+3 Laps	75
13	360	RunUp Tomei Sports	(Japan) Atsushi Tanaka (Japan) Yasushi Kikuchi	Callaway Corvette Z06.R GT3	Y	+3 Laps	75
14	85	JLOC	(Japan) Yuya Sakamoto (Japan) Masaki Kano	Lamborghini Gallardo RG-3	Y	+3 Laps	75
15	4	GSR Project Mirai	(Japan) Taku Bamba (Japan) Masahiro Sasaki	BMW Z4 GT3	Y	+4 Laps	74
16	22	R'Qs Motorsports	(Japan) Masaki Jyonai (Japan) Hisashi Wada	Vemac RD350R	Y	+4 Laps	74
17	88	MonePa JLOC	(Japan) Manabu Orido (Japan) Takayuki Aoki	Lamborghini Gallardo GT3	Y	+4 Laps	74
18	20	Racerbook Hitotsuyama Racing	(Japan) Hideki Noda (United States) Michael Kim	Audi R8 LMS	Y	+5 Laps	73
19	3	S-Road NDDP	(Japan) Katsumasa Chiyo (Japan) Yuhi Sekiguchi	Nissan GT-R GT3	Y	+5 Laps	73
20	5	Team Mach	(Japan) Masayuki Ueda (Japan) Tetsuji Tamanaka	Ferrari 458 Italia GT3	Y	+9 Laps	69
21	87	JLOC	(Japan) Hideki Yamauchi (Japan) Koji Yamanishi	Lamborghini Gallardo GT3	Y	+16 Laps	62
DNF	61	R&D Sport	(Japan) Tetsuya Yamano (Japan) Kota Sasaki	Subaru BRZ	Y	+33 Laps	45
DNF	48	NEON Dijon Racing	(Japan) Shogo Mitsuyama (Japan) Hiroshi Takamori	Callaway Corvette Z06.R GT3	Y	+48 Laps	30
DNF	31	Hasepro apr	(Japan) Koki Saga (Japan) Morio Nitta	Toyota Prius	Y	+55 Laps	23
DNF	86	Verity BOMEX JLOC	(Japan) Hideshi Matsuda (Japan) Junichiro Yamashita	Lamborghini Gallardo RG-3	Y	+56 Laps	22
