= 2012 Super GT Series =

Motorsport season

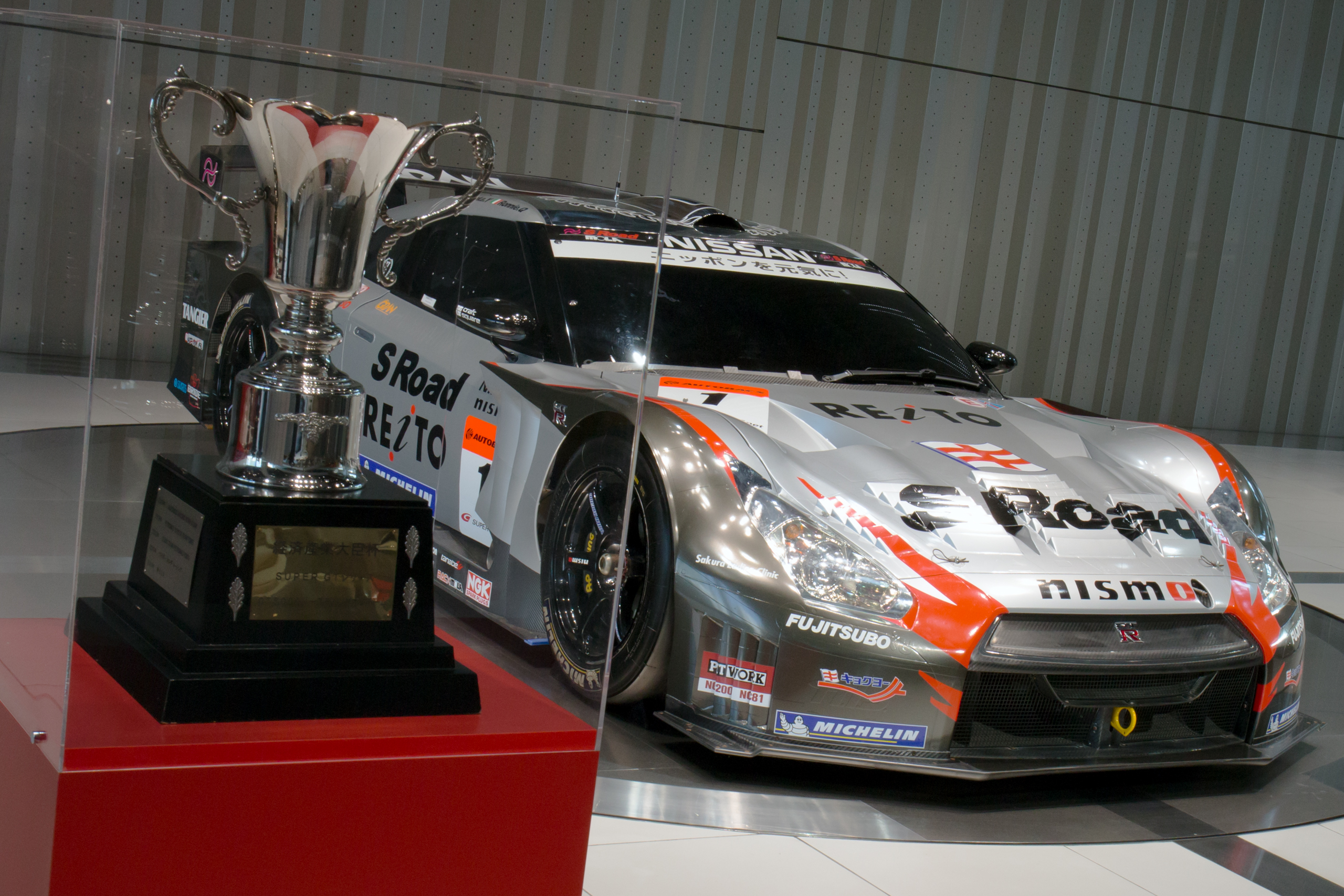
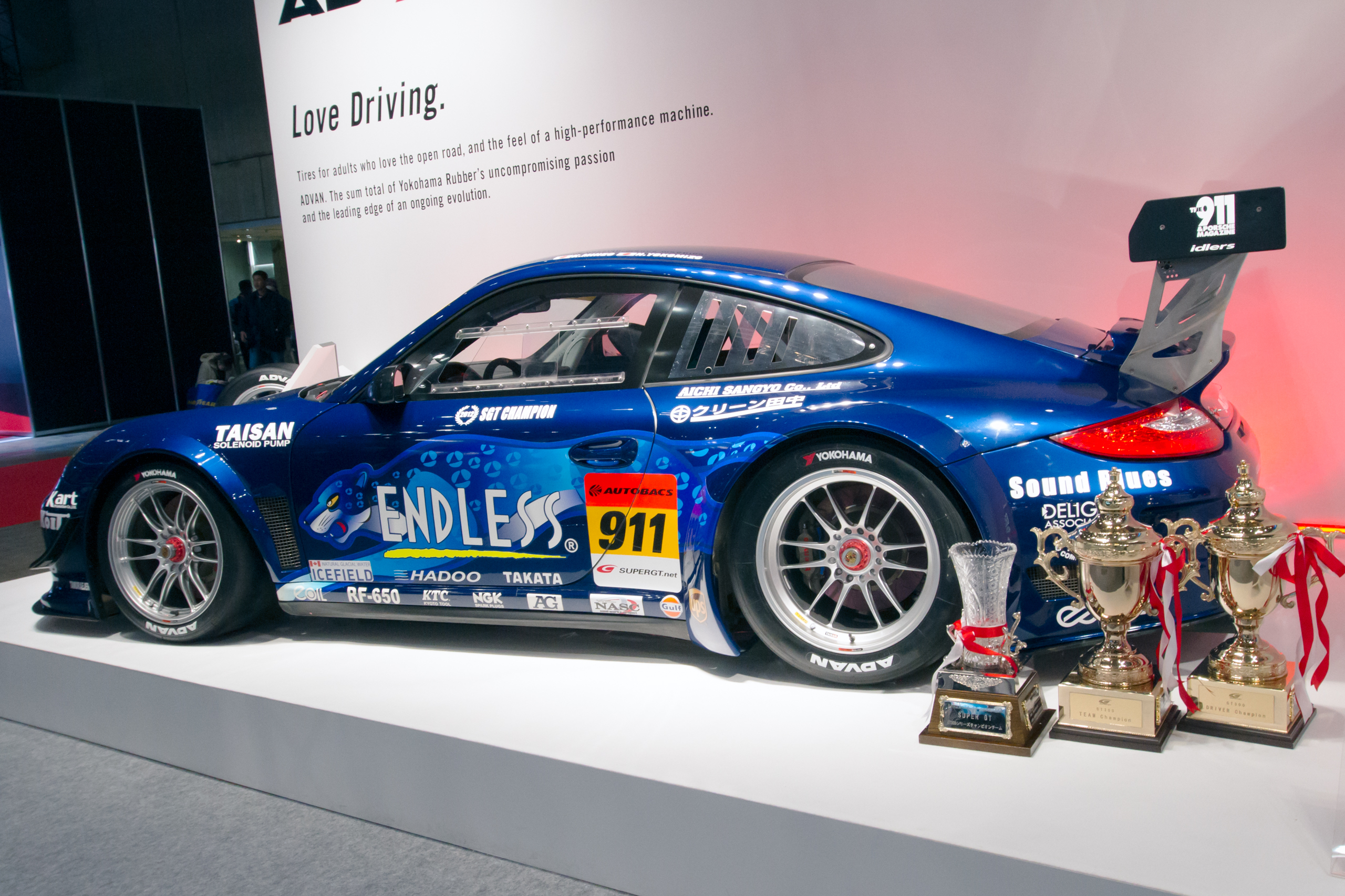
MOLA won the GT500 Drivers' and Teams' championship titles (pictured with the trophy in 2013). Team Taisan won the GT300 Drivers' and Teams' championship titles (pictured with the trophies in 2013).

The 2012 Autobacs Super GT Series was the twentieth season of the Japan Automobile Federation Super GT Championship including the All Japan Grand Touring Car Championship (JGTC) era and the eighth season as the Super GT series. It also marked the thirtieth season of a JAF-sanctioned sports car racing championship dating back to the All Japan Sports Prototype Championship. The season began on April 1 and ended on November 18, 2012, after eight championship races and a non-championship race.

Masataka Yanagida and Ronnie Quintarelli of Nissan works team MOLA won their second consecutive GT500 Drivers' and Teams' Championships, and became only the second team and driver combination to win the GT500 championship before the final round of the season. Team Taisan Endless and drivers Kyosuke Mineo and Naoki Yokomizo won the GT300 championships in their new Porsche 911 GT3-R, giving Team Taisan their final Super GT championship.

== Schedule ==
2012 venues

Round	Race	Circuit	Date
1	Okayama GT; 300 km	(Japan) Okayama International Circuit	April 1
2	Fuji GT 1; 500 km	(Japan) Fuji Speedway	May 4
3	Super GT International Series Malaysia; 300 km	(Malaysia) Sepang International Circuit	June 10
4	Sugo GT; 300 km	(Japan) Sportsland SUGO	July 29
5	41st International Pokka 1000km 1000 km	(Japan) Suzuka Circuit	August 19
6	Fuji GT 2; 300 km	(Japan) Fuji Speedway	September 9
7	Autopolis GT; 300 km	(Japan) Autopolis	September 30
8	Motegi GT; 250 km	(Japan) Twin Ring Motegi	October 28
NC	Fuji Sprint Cup	(Japan) Fuji Speedway	November 17
NC	Fuji Sprint Cup	(Japan) Fuji Speedway	November 18

== Regulation changes ==
From this season, the GT300 class fully incorporated the Group GT3 ruleset and Balance of Performance parameters used by the SRO Motorsports Group. Sixteen GT300 entries that competed in all or most domestic rounds were GT3 vehicles. GT3 vehicles won every championship round, plus both races of the non-championship Fuji Sprint Cup, along with the series championship.

2012 saw the introduction of hybrid powertrain vehicles to the GT300 category. Constructor apr introduced a Toyota Prius JAF-GT300 vehicle powered by a battery-driven hybrid system, and Mugen (M-TEC) followed shortly after by introducing the Honda CR-Z GT300 with a racing hybrid system developed by Zytek. Vehicles from the JAF-GT Category C (vehicles based on modified sports cars with minimal production requirements) and Category D (prototype cars not belonging to other JAF-GT categories) were phased out beginning in 2012. These outgoing vehicles included the Mooncraft Shiden, ASL Garaiya, and Vemac RD320R, which had been mainstays of the series for much of the past decade. On the other hand, JAF-GT Category A and B cars, based on mass production models, were allowed to use traction control beginning in 2012, and were also given concessions such as 14-inch width tyres, paddle sequential shifters, and larger diameter air restrictors.

== Drivers and teams ==
=== GT500 ===
Team	Make	Car	Engine	No.	Drivers	Tyre	Round
(Japan) MOLA	Nissan	Nissan GT-R GT500	Nissan VRH34B 3.4 L V8	1	(Japan) Masataka Yanagida	MI	All
(Japan) MOLA	Nissan	Nissan GT-R GT500	Nissan VRH34B 3.4 L V8	1	(Italy) Ronnie Quintarelli	MI	All
(Japan) Lexus Team LeMans ENEOS	Lexus	Lexus SC430 GT500	Lexus RV8KG 3.4 L V8	6	(Japan) Daisuke Itō	B	All
(Japan) Lexus Team LeMans ENEOS	Lexus	Lexus SC430 GT500	Lexus RV8KG 3.4 L V8	6	(Japan) Kazuya Oshima	B	All
(Japan) Autobacs Racing Team Aguri	Honda	Honda HSV-010 GT	Honda HR10EG 3.4 L V8	8	(Republic of Ireland) Ralph Firman	B	All
(Japan) Autobacs Racing Team Aguri	Honda	Honda HSV-010 GT	Honda HR10EG 3.4 L V8	8	(Japan) Takashi Kobayashi	B	All
(Japan) Team Impul	Nissan	Nissan GT-R GT500	Nissan VRH34B 3.4 L V8	12	(Japan) Tsugio Matsuda	B	All
(Japan) Team Impul	Nissan	Nissan GT-R GT500	Nissan VRH34B 3.4 L V8	12	(Brazil) João Paulo de Oliveira	B	All
(Japan) Keihin Real Racing	Honda	Honda HSV-010 GT	Honda HR10EG 3.4 L V8	17	(Japan) Toshihiro Kaneishi	B	All
(Japan) Keihin Real Racing	Honda	Honda HSV-010 GT	Honda HR10EG 3.4 L V8	17	(Japan) Koudai Tsukakoshi	B	All
(Japan) Weider Honda Racing	Honda	Honda HSV-010 GT	Honda HR10EG 3.4 L V8	18	(Japan) Takashi Kogure	B	All
(Japan) Weider Honda Racing	Honda	Honda HSV-010 GT	Honda HR10EG 3.4 L V8	18	(Netherlands) Carlo van Dam	B	All
(Japan) Lexus Team WedsSport BANDOH	Lexus	Lexus SC430 GT500	Lexus RV8KG 3.4 L V8	19	(Japan) Seiji Ara	Y	All
(Japan) Lexus Team WedsSport BANDOH	Lexus	Lexus SC430 GT500	Lexus RV8KG 3.4 L V8	19	(Portugal) André Couto	Y	1–8
(Japan) Lexus Team WedsSport BANDOH	Lexus	Lexus SC430 GT500	Lexus RV8KG 3.4 L V8	19	(United Kingdom) Marino Franchitti	Y	NC
(Japan) Nismo	Nissan	Nissan GT-R GT500	Nissan VRH34B 3.4 L V8	23	(Japan) Satoshi Motoyama	B	All
(Japan) Nismo	Nissan	Nissan GT-R GT500	Nissan VRH34B 3.4 L V8	23	(Germany) Michael Krumm	B	All
(Japan) Kondo Racing	Nissan	Nissan GT-R GT500	Nissan VRH34B 3.4 L V8	24	(Japan) Hironobu Yasuda	Y	All
(Japan) Kondo Racing	Nissan	Nissan GT-R GT500	Nissan VRH34B 3.4 L V8	24	(Sweden) Björn Wirdheim	Y	All
(Japan) Epson Nakajima Racing	Honda	Honda HSV-010 GT	Honda HR10EG 3.4 L V8	32	(Japan) Ryō Michigami	D	All
(Japan) Epson Nakajima Racing	Honda	Honda HSV-010 GT	Honda HR10EG 3.4 L V8	32	(Japan) Yuhki Nakayama	D	All
(Japan) Lexus Team KeePer Kraft	Lexus	Lexus SC430 GT500	Lexus RV8KG 3.4 L V8	35	(Japan) Yuji Kunimoto	B	All
(Japan) Lexus Team KeePer Kraft	Lexus	Lexus SC430 GT500	Lexus RV8KG 3.4 L V8	35	(Italy) Andrea Caldarelli	B	All
(Japan) Lexus Team Petronas TOM'S	Lexus	Lexus SC430 GT500	Lexus RV8KG 3.4 L V8	36	(Japan) Kazuki Nakajima	B	All
(Japan) Lexus Team Petronas TOM'S	Lexus	Lexus SC430 GT500	Lexus RV8KG 3.4 L V8	36	(France) Loïc Duval	B	1, 3–8, NC
(Japan) Lexus Team Petronas TOM'S	Lexus	Lexus SC430 GT500	Lexus RV8KG 3.4 L V8	36	(United Kingdom) Richard Lyons	B	2
(Japan) Lexus Team ZENT Cerumo	Lexus	Lexus SC430 GT500	Lexus RV8KG 3.4 L V8	38	(Japan) Yuji Tachikawa	B	All
(Japan) Lexus Team ZENT Cerumo	Lexus	Lexus SC430 GT500	Lexus RV8KG 3.4 L V8	38	(Japan) Kohei Hirate	B	All
(Japan) Lexus Team SARD	Lexus	Lexus SC430 GT500	Lexus RV8KG 3.4 L V8	39	(Japan) Juichi Wakisaka	MI	All
(Japan) Lexus Team SARD	Lexus	Lexus SC430 GT500	Lexus RV8KG 3.4 L V8	39	(Japan) Hiroaki Ishiura	MI	All
(Japan) Team Kunimitsu	Honda	Honda HSV-010 GT	Honda HR10EG 3.4 L V8	100	(Japan) Takuya Izawa	B	All
(Japan) Team Kunimitsu	Honda	Honda HSV-010 GT	Honda HR10EG 3.4 L V8	100	(Japan) Naoki Yamamoto	B	All

=== GT300 ===
Team	Make	Car	Engine	No.	Drivers	Tyre	Round
(Japan) GSR & Studie with Team Ukyo	BMW	BMW Z4 GT3	BMW P65B44 4.4 L V8	0	(Japan) Nobuteru Taniguchi	Y	All
(Japan) GSR & Studie with Team Ukyo	BMW	BMW Z4 GT3	BMW P65B44 4.4 L V8	0	(Japan) Tatsuya Kataoka	Y	All
(Japan) GSR & Studie with Team Ukyo	BMW	BMW Z4 GT3	BMW P65B44 4.4 L V8	4	(Japan) Taku Bamba	Y	All
(Japan) GSR & Studie with Team Ukyo	BMW	BMW Z4 GT3	BMW P65B44 4.4 L V8	4	(Japan) Masahiro Sasaki	Y	All
(Japan) Cars Tokai Dream28	Mooncraft	Mooncraft Shiden	Toyota 1UZ-FE 4.0 L V8	2	(Japan) Kazuho Takahashi	Y	All
(Japan) Cars Tokai Dream28	Mooncraft	Mooncraft Shiden	Toyota 1UZ-FE 4.0 L V8	2	(Japan) Hiroki Katoh	Y	All
(Japan) Cars Tokai Dream28	Mooncraft	Mooncraft Shiden	Toyota 1UZ-FE 4.0 L V8	2	(Japan) Hiroshi Hamaguchi	Y	5
(Japan) NDDP Racing	Nissan	Nissan GT-R GT3	Nissan VR38DETT 3.8 L Twin Turbo V6	3	(Japan) Yuhi Sekiguchi	Y	1–5, 7–8, NC
(Japan) NDDP Racing	Nissan	Nissan GT-R GT3	Nissan VR38DETT 3.8 L Twin Turbo V6	3	(Japan) Katsumasa Chiyo	Y	All
(Japan) NDDP Racing	Nissan	Nissan GT-R GT3	Nissan VR38DETT 3.8 L Twin Turbo V6	3	(Japan) Daiki Sasaki	Y	5–6
(Japan) Team Mach	Ferrari	Ferrari 458 Italia GT3	Ferrari F136F 4.5 L V8	5	(Japan) Tetsuji Tamanaka	Y	1–2, 4–8, NC
(Japan) Team Mach	Ferrari	Ferrari 458 Italia GT3	Ferrari F136F 4.5 L V8	5	(Japan) Masayuki Ueda	Y	1–2, 4–8, NC
(Japan) Team Mach	Ferrari	Ferrari 458 Italia GT3	Ferrari F136F 4.5 L V8	5	(Japan) Masataka Kawaguchi	Y	2
(Japan) Gainer	Audi	Audi R8 LMS ultra	Audi CJJ 5.2 L V10	11	(Japan) Tetsuya Tanaka	D	All
(Japan) Gainer	Audi	Audi R8 LMS ultra	Audi CJJ 5.2 L V10	11	(Japan) Katsuyuki Hiranaka	D	All
(Japan) Gainer	Audi	Audi R8 LMS ultra	Audi CJJ 5.2 L V10	11	(Japan) Atsushi Yogo	D	5
(Singapore) Team SGC	Lexus	Lexus IS350 GT300	Lexus RV8J 3.4 L V8	14	(Japan) Ryo Orime	Y	4–8, NC
(Singapore) Team SGC	Lexus	Lexus IS350 GT300	Lexus RV8J 3.4 L V8	14	(Switzerland) Alexandre Imperatori	Y	4–6
(Singapore) Team SGC	Lexus	Lexus IS350 GT300	Lexus RV8J 3.4 L V8	14	(Japan) Naoya Yamano	Y	7–8, NC
(Japan) Team Art Taste	Porsche	Porsche 911 GT3-R	Porsche M97/79 4.0 L F6	15	(Germany) Tim Bergmeister	Y	1–2
(Japan) Team Art Taste	Porsche	Porsche 911 GT3-R	Porsche M97/79 4.0 L F6	15	(Japan) Takeshi Tsuchiya	Y	1–2
(Japan) Team Art Taste	Porsche	Porsche 911 GT3-R	Porsche M97/79 4.0 L F6	15	(Germany) Jörg Bergmeister	Y	2
(Japan) Team Mugen	Honda	Honda CR-Z GT	Honda HR28TT 2.8 L Twin Turbo Hybrid V6	16	(Japan) Hideki Mutoh	B	4–8, NC
(Japan) Team Mugen	Honda	Honda CR-Z GT	Honda HR28TT 2.8 L Twin Turbo Hybrid V6	16	(Japan) Daisuke Nakajima	B	4–8, NC
(Japan) Hitotsuyama Racing	Audi	Audi R8 LMS	Audi CJJ 5.2 L V10	20	(Japan) Hideki Noda	Y	1–2
(Japan) Hitotsuyama Racing	Audi	Audi R8 LMS	Audi CJJ 5.2 L V10	20	(United States) Michael Kim	Y	1
(Japan) Hitotsuyama Racing	Audi	Audi R8 LMS	Audi CJJ 5.2 L V10	20	(Japan) Kenji Kobayashi	Y	2
(Japan) Hitotsuyama Racing	Audi	Audi R8 LMS	Audi CJJ 5.2 L V10	20	(Hong Kong) Frank Yu	Y	2
(Japan) Hitotsuyama Racing	Audi	Audi R8 LMS	Audi CJJ 5.2 L V10	21	(Japan) Akihiro Tsuzuki	Y	All
(Japan) Hitotsuyama Racing	Audi	Audi R8 LMS	Audi CJJ 5.2 L V10	21	(Switzerland) Cyndie Allemann	Y	1–5
(Japan) Hitotsuyama Racing	Audi	Audi R8 LMS	Audi CJJ 5.2 L V10	21	(United Kingdom) Richard Lyons	Y	5–8, NC
(Japan) Hitotsuyama Racing	Audi	Audi R8 LMS	Audi CJJ 5.2 L V10	21	(Japan) Yukinori Taniguchi	Y	2
(Japan) Hitotsuyama Racing	Audi	Audi R8 LMS	Audi CJJ 5.2 L V10	77	(Ukraine) Igor Sushko	Y	8, NC
(Japan) Hitotsuyama Racing	Audi	Audi R8 LMS	Audi CJJ 5.2 L V10	77	(Japan) Kenji Kobayashi	Y	8, NC
(Japan) Hitotsuyama Racing	Audi	Audi R8 LMS	Audi CJJ 5.2 L V10	99	(Hong Kong) Frank Yu	Y	3, 7
(Japan) Hitotsuyama Racing	Audi	Audi R8 LMS	Audi CJJ 5.2 L V10	99	(Japan) Hideto Yasuoka	Y	3–5, 7
(Japan) Hitotsuyama Racing	Audi	Audi R8 LMS	Audi CJJ 5.2 L V10	99	(United States) Michael Kim	Y	4–5
(Japan) Hitotsuyama Racing	Audi	Audi R8 LMS	Audi CJJ 5.2 L V10	99	(Japan) Yoshio Tsuzuki	Y	5
(Japan) R'Qs Motorsports	Vemac	Vemac RD350R	Zytek ZV348 4.0 L V8	22	(Japan) Hisashi Wada	Y	All
(Japan) R'Qs Motorsports	Vemac	Vemac RD350R	Zytek ZV348 4.0 L V8	22	(Japan) Masaki Jyonai	Y	All
(France) LMP Motorsport	Ferrari	Ferrari F430 GTC	Ferrari F136GT 4.3 L V8	27	(Japan) Yutaka Yamagishi	Y	1–8
(France) LMP Motorsport	Ferrari	Ferrari F430 GTC	Ferrari F136GT 4.3 L V8	27	(Japan) Takuto Iguchi	Y	1–8
(Japan) apr	Audi	Audi R8 LMS ultra	Audi CJJ 5.2 L V10	30	(Japan) Yuki Iwasaki	Y	All
(Japan) apr	Audi	Audi R8 LMS ultra	Audi CJJ 5.2 L V10	30	(Japan) Yuya Sakamoto	Y	All
(Japan) apr	Audi	Audi R8 LMS ultra	Audi CJJ 5.2 L V10	30	(Japan) Kenji Kobayashi	Y	5
(Japan) apr	Toyota	Toyota Prius apr GT	Toyota RV8KLM 3.4 L Hybrid V8	31	(Japan) Morio Nitta	Y	All
(Japan) apr	Toyota	Toyota Prius apr GT	Toyota RV8KLM 3.4 L Hybrid V8	31	(Japan) Koki Saga	Y	All
(Japan) apr	Toyota	Toyota Prius apr GT	Toyota RV8KLM 3.4 L Hybrid V8	31	(Japan) Yuichi Nakayama	Y	5
(Japan) Hankook KTR	Porsche	Porsche 911 GT3-R	Porsche M97/79 4.0 L F6	33	(Japan) Masami Kageyama	HK	All
(Japan) Hankook KTR	Porsche	Porsche 911 GT3-R	Porsche M97/79 4.0 L F6	33	(Japan) Tomonobu Fujii	HK	All
(Japan) Autobacs Racing Team Aguri	ASL	ASL ARTA Garaiya	Nissan VQ35DE 3.5 L V6	43	(Japan) Shinichi Takagi	B	All
(Japan) Autobacs Racing Team Aguri	ASL	ASL ARTA Garaiya	Nissan VQ35DE 3.5 L V6	43	(Japan) Kosuke Matsuura	B	All
(Japan) Dijon Racing	Callaway	Callaway Corvette Z06.R GT3	Callaway LS7.R 7.0 L V8	48	(Japan) Hiroshi Takamori	Y	1–2, 4–6, 8, NC
(Japan) Dijon Racing	Callaway	Callaway Corvette Z06.R GT3	Callaway LS7.R 7.0 L V8	48	(Japan) Shogo Mitsuyama	Y	1–2, 4–6, 8, NC
(Japan) Dijon Racing	Callaway	Callaway Corvette Z06.R GT3	Callaway LS7.R 7.0 L V8	48	(Japan) Keiichi Inoue	Y	2, 5
(Japan) Green Tec & Leon with Shift	Mercedes-Benz	Mercedes-Benz SLS AMG GT3	Mercedes-Benz M159 6.2 L V8	52	(Japan) Hironori Takeuchi	Y	All
(Japan) Green Tec & Leon with Shift	Mercedes-Benz	Mercedes-Benz SLS AMG GT3	Mercedes-Benz M159 6.2 L V8	52	(Japan) Haruki Kurosawa	Y	1–5, 7–8, NC
(Japan) Green Tec & Leon with Shift	Mercedes-Benz	Mercedes-Benz SLS AMG GT3	Mercedes-Benz M159 6.2 L V8	52	(Japan) Akihiko Nakaya	Y	5
(Japan) Green Tec & Leon with Shift	Mercedes-Benz	Mercedes-Benz SLS AMG GT3	Mercedes-Benz M159 6.2 L V8	52	(Japan) Takeshi Tsuchiya	Y	6
(Japan) R&D Sport	Subaru	Subaru BRZ GT300	Subaru EJ20 2.0 L Turbo F4	61	(Japan) Tetsuya Yamano	Y	All
(Japan) R&D Sport	Subaru	Subaru BRZ GT300	Subaru EJ20 2.0 L Turbo F4	61	(Japan) Kota Sasaki	Y	All
(Japan) A speed	Aston Martin	Aston Martin Vantage GT2	Aston Martin AJ37 4.7 L V8	66	(Japan) Hiroki Yoshimoto	Y	1
(Japan) A speed	Aston Martin	Aston Martin Vantage GT2	Aston Martin AJ37 4.7 L V8	66	(Japan) Kazuki Hoshino	Y	1
(Japan) A speed	Aston Martin	Aston Martin V12 Vantage GT3	Aston Martin AM11 5.9 L V12	66	(Japan) Hiroki Yoshimoto	Y	2–8, NC
(Japan) A speed	Aston Martin	Aston Martin V12 Vantage GT3	Aston Martin AM11 5.9 L V12	66	(Japan) Kazuki Hoshino	Y	2–8, NC
(Japan) A speed	Aston Martin	Aston Martin V12 Vantage GT3	Aston Martin AM11 5.9 L V12	66	(Japan) Hiroki Yoshida	Y	5
(Singapore) ThunderAsia Racing	Mosler	Mosler MT900M	Judd XV675 3.5 L V8	69	(Malaysia) Fairuz Fauzy	Y	3
(Singapore) ThunderAsia Racing	Mosler	Mosler MT900M	Judd XV675 3.5 L V8	69	(Japan) Hiroki Yoshida	Y	3
(Japan) JLOC	Lamborghini	Lamborghini Gallardo RG-3	Lamborghini 07L1 5.2 L V10	85	(Japan) Yuya Sakamoto	Y	1–2, 5–7
(Japan) JLOC	Lamborghini	Lamborghini Gallardo RG-3	Lamborghini 07L1 5.2 L V10	85	(Japan) Masaki Kano	Y	1–2, 6
(Japan) JLOC	Lamborghini	Lamborghini Gallardo RG-3	Lamborghini 07L1 5.2 L V10	85	(Japan) Ryohei Sakaguchi	Y	2, 5
(Japan) JLOC	Lamborghini	Lamborghini Gallardo RG-3	Lamborghini 07L1 5.2 L V10	85	(Japan) Hideshi Matsuda	Y	7
(Japan) JLOC	Lamborghini	Lamborghini Gallardo RG-3	Lamborghini 07L1 5.2 L V10	86	(Japan) Hideshi Matsuda	Y	1–5, NC
(Japan) JLOC	Lamborghini	Lamborghini Gallardo RG-3	Lamborghini 07L1 5.2 L V10	86	(Japan) Junichiro Yamashita	Y	1–5, NC
(Japan) JLOC	Lamborghini	Lamborghini Gallardo GT3	Lamborghini CEH 5.2 L V10	87	(Japan) Koji Yamanishi	Y	All
(Japan) JLOC	Lamborghini	Lamborghini Gallardo GT3	Lamborghini CEH 5.2 L V10	87	(Japan) Hideki Yamauchi	Y	1–8
(Japan) JLOC	Lamborghini	Lamborghini Gallardo GT3	Lamborghini CEH 5.2 L V10	87	(Japan) Yuya Sakamoto	Y	NC
(Japan) JLOC	Lamborghini	Lamborghini Gallardo GT3	Lamborghini CEH 5.2 L V10	88	(Japan) Manabu Orido	Y	All
(Japan) JLOC	Lamborghini	Lamborghini Gallardo GT3	Lamborghini CEH 5.2 L V10	88	(Japan) Takayuki Aoki	Y	All
(Japan) JLOC	Lamborghini	Lamborghini Gallardo GT3	Lamborghini CEH 5.2 L V10	88	(Japan) Keita Sawa	Y	5
(Japan) Tomei Sports	Callaway	Callaway Corvette Z06.R GT3	Callaway LS7.R 7.0 L V8	360	(Japan) Atsushi Tanaka	Y	1–4, 6–8, NC
(Japan) Tomei Sports	Callaway	Callaway Corvette Z06.R GT3	Callaway LS7.R 7.0 L V8	360	(Japan) Yasushi Kikuchi	Y	1
(Japan) Tomei Sports	Callaway	Callaway Corvette Z06.R GT3	Callaway LS7.R 7.0 L V8	360	(Japan) Takuya Shirasaka	Y	2–4, 6–8, NC
(Japan) Team Taisan ENDLESS	Porsche	Porsche 911 GT3-R	Porsche M97/79 4.0 L F6	911	(Japan) Kyosuke Mineo	Y	All
(Japan) Team Taisan ENDLESS	Porsche	Porsche 911 GT3-R	Porsche M97/79 4.0 L F6	911	(Japan) Naoki Yokomizo	Y	All

=== Entrant Changes ===
==== GT500 Class ====
- Nissan: Two-time GT500 champion Michael Krumm replaced 2008 champion Benoît Tréluyer at NISMO. Tréluyer left the Japanese circuit in order to drive full-time for Audi in the new FIA World Endurance Championship, while Krumm had returned after competing in the FIA GT1 World Championship.
- Lexus: 2010 champion Loïc Duval transferred out of Honda to join Lexus at Team Petronas TOM's, replacing André Lotterer, who left the series in order to drive full-time for Audi in the FIA World Endurance Championship. Within the Lexus camp, three-time series champion Juichi Wakisaka transferred to Lexus Team SARD, and André Couto transferred to Lexus Team WedsSport Bandoh. Yuji Kunimoto and Andrea Caldarelli each made their GT500 debuts, forming an all-rookie lineup at Lexus Team KeePer Kraft.
- Honda: 2008 All-Japan Formula 3 champion Carlo Van Dam made his full-time GT500 debut, replacing Duval at Weider Honda Racing. Ralph Firman returned to ARTA after a year away from racing in Japan.

==== GT300 Class ====
- Reigning champions Goodsmile Racing & Studie with Team UKYO expanded to a two-car operation with the BMW Z4 GT3. Last year's championship-winning entry changed its number to 0, and championship winning driver Nobuteru Taniguchi was joined by former Lexus GT500 driver Tatsuya Kataoka. Co-champion Taku Bamba moved to the new number 4 car, joined by Masahiro Sasaki, who drove for GSR in 2010.
- NDDP (Nissan Driver Development Program) Racing entered the series with the all-new Nissan GT-R NISMO GT3. The team was managed by Masahiro Hasemi, and carried the number 3 which was associated with Hasemi Motor Sports, who competed in the series until 2010. Reigning All-Japan Formula 3 champion Yuhi Sekiguchi, and All-Japan F3 National Class champion Katsumasa Chiyo, were the team's drivers.
- SHIFT, the team managed by former GT500 champion Hironori Takeuchi, re-entered the series with the all-new Mercedes-Benz SLS AMG GT3. The team competed under the banner of Green Tec & LEON with Shift, with Takeuchi and former Team Mach driver Haruki Kurosawa as their drivers.
- Subaru and Subaru Tecnica International (STI) launched the BRZ GT300. The BRZ GT300 was entered by R&D Sport, who raced with the Legacy B4 between 2009 and 2011.
- apr introduced the hybrid-powered Toyota Prius GT to replace their previous Corolla Axio GT model. The number 31 Prius was driven by Morio Nitta and Koki Saga. apr also fielded a second entry with an Audi R8 LMS Ultra, driven by Yuki Iwasaki and Yuya Sakamoto (of Tokyo).
- M-TEC (as Team Mugen) would return to the series as an independent team, and introduced the hybrid-powered Honda CR-Z GT300, beginning from the fourth round at Sportsland Sugo. GT500 race winner Hideki Mutoh, and second-generation rookie driver Daisuke Nakajima were announced as Mugen's drivers.
- Gainer changed vehicles from the Ferrari 458 GTC to the new Audi R8 LMS Ultra, and consolidated their programme into a single-car entry.
- Hankook KTR, who entered a second car in select races in 2011, consolidated their programme into a single-car entry, their number 33 Porsche 911 GT3-R (Type 997) driven by Masami Kageyama and Tomonobu Fujii.
- Hitotsuyama Racing returned to the series for the first time since 2009, fielding two Audi R8 LMS. Their primary entry, number 21, was prepared by Nova Engineering, and driven by Akihiro Tsuzuki (who transferred from Samurai Team Tsuchiya) and rookie Cyndie Allemann, who became the first woman to race in the series since Keiko Ihara in 2003. Their second entry was prepared by Mooncraft Engineering, and began the season as car number 20 with Hideki Noda as their ace driver alongside Michael Kim.
- JLOC entered two new Lamborghini Gallardo GT3s, the number 88 driven by Manabu Orido and Takayuki Aoki, and the number 87 driven by Koji Yamanishi (who rejoined JLOC after a year's absence) and Hideki Yamauchi (who transferred from LMP Motorsport). They also fielded two of their existing Gallardo RG-3 models in multiple races, giving them as many as four entries.
- Former Lexus GT500 driver Takuto Iguchi joined LMP Motorsport after being displaced from Lexus Team SARD.
- Team Taisan consolidated to a single-car effort and changed vehicles to the new Porsche 911 GT3-R (Type 997), in a collaboration with Endless Sports. Kyosuke Mineo was joined by former GT500 class race winner Naoki Yokomizo.
- Team Mach changed vehicles to the latest Ferrari 458 GT3, and gentleman driver Masayuki Ueda joined the team from Gainer.
- Team Art Taste, who debuted in the fifth round of the 2011 season, planned to enter the full 2012 season with a Porsche 911 GT3-R prepared by Cox, and a driver lineup featuring Tim Bergmeister and Takeshi Tsuchiya.
- Dijon Racing entered the series for the first time, fielding the Callaway Corvette Z06.R GT3 for drivers Hiroshi Takamori (who transferred from Hankook KTR) and Shogo Mitsuyama (who transferred from Team Taisan).
- Team SG Changi reincorporated as Team SGC, and eventually returned to the series beginning at the fourth round at Sportsland Sugo, where returning drivers Ryo Orime and Alexandre Imperatori won in 2011 with their Lexus IS 350 GT300.
- ThunderAsia Racing went from a full-season entry, to a one-off entrant in the third round at Sepang Circuit with drivers Fairuz Fauzy and Hiroki Yoshida.

=== Mid-season Changes ===
==== GT500 Class ====
- 2004 GT500 champion Richard Lyons joined Lexus Team Petronas TOM's for the Fuji GT 500 km Race. Loïc Duval was unavailable, as he was competing in the 6 Hours of Spa-Francorchamps with Audi Sport Team Joest.
- Marino Franchitti replaced André Couto at Lexus Team WedsSport Bandoh for the non-championship Fuji Sprint Cup. Couto was unavailable, as he was competing in the Macau Grand Prix Guia Race.

==== GT300 Class ====
- Team a Speed changed vehicles from the Aston Martin V8 Vantage GT2 to the V12 Vantage GT3 from the second round at Fuji Speedway. The V12 Vantage would go on to win two races in its first season in Japan.
- Tim Bergmeister was seriously injured in a crash during the Fuji 500 km, and Team Art Taste withdrew from all remaining rounds after their car was totalled in the accident. Takeshi Tsuchiya would go on to replace Haruki Kurosawa at Green Tec & LEON with Shift for the sixth round at Fuji Speedway, after Kurosawa was injured in a crash at the Suzuka 1000 km.
- NDDP prospect Daiki Sasaki replaced Yuhi Sekiguchi in the sixth round at Fuji Speedway. Sekiguchi was suspended for one race due to penalty points accrued under Super GT's Driving Moral Hazard System.
- Tomei Sports began the season with drivers Atsushi Tanaka and Yasushi Kikuchi, but Kikuchi was replaced from round two by rookie Takuya Shirasaka.
- Naoya Yamano replaced Alexandre Imperatori at Team SGC for the final two championship races and the Fuji Sprint Cup.
- JLOC's two Gallardo RG-3s changed drivers throughout the season. The number 86 car ran the first five rounds with Hideshi Matsuda and Junichiro Yamashita. Matsuda was then moved to the number 85 car in the seventh round at Autopolis, partnering Yuya Sakamoto (of Iwate Prefecture). Sakamoto had previously shared driving duties with Masaki Kano and Ryohei Sakaguchi in five of the previous six rounds. Neither of these cars entered the eighth round at Motegi, but the 86 car returned for the Fuji Sprint Cup with Matsuda and Yamashita as its drivers, and Sakamoto replaced Hideki Yamauchi in the number 87 Gallardo GT3 for the Fuji Sprint Cup.
- Hitotsuyama Racing's number 21 car brought on Richard Lyons as a third driver for the Suzuka 1000 km, and Lyons would replace Cyndie Allemann on a permanent basis for the rest of the season. Meanwhile, their second entry prepared by Mooncraft underwent numerous changes during the season: Hideki Noda left the team after two races, and was replaced with reigning Porsche Carrera Cup Japan champion Hideto Yasuoka. Frank Yu replaced Michael Kim for rounds two and three, before Kim returned for rounds four and five - by which point, the car changed its number to 99. After a one-race absence, the car returned as number 77, driven by Yu and Yasuoka in round seven, then by Ukrainian-American driver Igor Sushko and Kenji Kobayashi in round eight and the Fuji Sprint Cup.
- Third drivers entered for the Fuji 500 km included Jörg Bergmeister (Team Art Taste), Yukinori Taniguchi (Hitotsuyama Racing #21), Keiichi Inoue (Dijon Racing), and Masataka Kawaguchi (Team Mach). Third drivers entered for the Suzuka 1000 km included Inoue, Lyons, Daiki Sasaki, Yuichi Nakayama (apr #31), Akihiko Nakaya (Green Tec & LEON with Shift), Atsushi Yogo (Gainer), Keita Sawa (JLOC #88), Hiroshi Hamaguchi (Cars Tokai Dream28), Yoshio Tsuzuki (Hitotsuyama Racing #21), Kenji Kobayashi (apr #30), and Hiroki Yoshida, who was part of the class-winning Team a Speed, but did not drive during the race itself and received no championship points.

== Calendar ==
Round	Circuit	Date	Pole position	Race winner
1	(Japan) Okayama International Circuit; Report	1 April	#38 Lexus Team ZENT Cerumo	#38 Lexus Team ZENT Cerumo
1	(Japan) Okayama International Circuit; Report	1 April	(Japan) Yuji Tachikawa (Japan) Kohei Hirate	(Japan) Yuji Tachikawa (Japan) Kohei Hirate
1	(Japan) Okayama International Circuit; Report	1 April	#911 Team Taisan ENDLESS	#11 Gainer
1	(Japan) Okayama International Circuit; Report	1 April	(Japan) Kyosuke Mineo (Japan) Naoki Yokomizo	(Japan) Tetsuya Tanaka (Japan) Katsuyuki Hiranaka
2	(Japan) Fuji Speedway; Report	4 May	#32 Nakajima Racing	#39 Lexus Team SARD
2	(Japan) Fuji Speedway; Report	4 May	(Japan) Ryō Michigami (Japan) Yuhki Nakayama	(Japan) Hiroaki Ishiura (Japan) Juichi Wakisaka
2	(Japan) Fuji Speedway; Report	4 May	#11 Gainer	#0 GSR & Studie with Team UKYO
2	(Japan) Fuji Speedway; Report	4 May	(Japan) Tetsuya Tanaka (Japan) Katsuyuki Hiranaka	(Japan) Nobuteru Taniguchi (Japan) Tatsuya Kataoka
3	(Malaysia) Sepang International Circuit; Report	10 June	#18 Weider Honda Racing	#18 Weider Honda Racing
3	(Malaysia) Sepang International Circuit; Report	10 June	(Japan) Takashi Kogure (Netherlands) Carlo van Dam	(Japan) Takashi Kogure (Netherlands) Carlo van Dam
3	(Malaysia) Sepang International Circuit; Report	10 June	#33 Hankook KTR	#33 Hankook KTR
3	(Malaysia) Sepang International Circuit; Report	10 June	(Japan) Tomonobu Fujii (Japan) Masami Kageyama	(Japan) Tomonobu Fujii (Japan) Masami Kageyama
4	(Japan) Sportsland SUGO; Report	29 July	#6 Lexus Team LeMans ENEOS	#6 Lexus Team LeMans ENEOS
4	(Japan) Sportsland SUGO; Report	29 July	(Japan) Daisuke Ito (Japan) Kazuya Oshima	(Japan) Daisuke Ito (Japan) Kazuya Oshima
4	(Japan) Sportsland SUGO; Report	29 July	#33 Hankook KTR	#3 NDDP Racing
4	(Japan) Sportsland SUGO; Report	29 July	(Japan) Tomonobu Fujii (Japan) Masami Kageyama	(Japan) Yuhi Sekiguchi (Japan) Katsumasa Chiyo
5	(Japan) Suzuka Circuit; Report	19 August	#1 MOLA	#1 MOLA
5	(Japan) Suzuka Circuit; Report	19 August	(Japan) Masataka Yanagida (Italy) Ronnie Quintarelli	(Japan) Masataka Yanagida (Italy) Ronnie Quintarelli
5	(Japan) Suzuka Circuit; Report	19 August	#16 Team Mugen	#66 A speed
5	(Japan) Suzuka Circuit; Report	19 August	(Japan) Hideki Mutoh (Japan) Daisuke Nakajima	(Japan) Hiroki Yoshimoto (Japan) Kazuki Hoshino (Japan) Hiroki Yoshida
6	(Japan) Fuji Speedway; Report	9 September	#12 Team Impul	#12 Team Impul
6	(Japan) Fuji Speedway; Report	9 September	(Japan) Tsugio Matsuda (Brazil) João Paulo de Oliveira	(Japan) Tsugio Matsuda (Brazil) João Paulo de Oliveira
6	(Japan) Fuji Speedway; Report	9 September	#31 apr	#33 Hankook KTR
6	(Japan) Fuji Speedway; Report	9 September	(Japan) Morio Nitta (Japan) Koki Saga	(Japan) Tomonobu Fujii (Japan) Masami Kageyama
7	(Japan) Autopolis; Report	30 September	#19 Lexus Team WedsSport BANDOH	#1 MOLA
7	(Japan) Autopolis; Report	30 September	(Japan) Seiji Ara (Portugal) André Couto	(Japan) Masataka Yanagida (Italy) Ronnie Quintarelli
7	(Japan) Autopolis; Report	30 September	#3 NDDP Racing	#66 A speed
7	(Japan) Autopolis; Report	30 September	(Japan) Yuhi Sekiguchi (Japan) Katsumasa Chiyo	(Japan) Hiroki Yoshimoto (Japan) Kazuki Hoshino
8	(Japan) Twin Ring Motegi; Report	28 October	#38 Lexus Team ZENT Cerumo	#38 Lexus Team ZENT Cerumo
8	(Japan) Twin Ring Motegi; Report	28 October	(Japan) Yuji Tachikawa (Japan) Kohei Hirate	(Japan) Yuji Tachikawa (Japan) Kohei Hirate
8	(Japan) Twin Ring Motegi; Report	28 October	#33 Hankook KTR	#911 Team Taisan ENDLESS
8	(Japan) Twin Ring Motegi; Report	28 October	(Japan) Tomonobu Fujii (Japan) Masami Kageyama	(Japan) Kyosuke Mineo (Japan) Naoki Yokomizo
NC	(Japan) Fuji Speedway; Report	17 November	#6 Lexus Team LeMans ENEOS	#1 MOLA
NC	(Japan) Fuji Speedway; Report	17 November	(Japan) Kazuya Oshima	(Italy) Ronnie Quintarelli
NC	(Japan) Fuji Speedway; Report	17 November	#33 Hankook KTR	#33 Hankook KTR
NC	(Japan) Fuji Speedway; Report	17 November	(Japan) Tomonobu Fujii	(Japan) Tomonobu Fujii
NC	(Japan) Fuji Speedway; Report	18 November	#36 Lexus Team Petronas TOM'S	#38 Lexus Team ZENT Cerumo
NC	(Japan) Fuji Speedway; Report	18 November	(Japan) Kazuki Nakajima	(Japan) Yuji Tachikawa
NC	(Japan) Fuji Speedway; Report	18 November	#33 Hankook KTR	#66 A speed
NC	(Japan) Fuji Speedway; Report	18 November	(Japan) Masami Kageyama	(Japan) Hiroki Yoshimoto

== Standings ==
=== GT500 Drivers ===
Scoring system

Position	1st	2nd	3rd	4th	5th	6th	7th	8th	9th	10th
Points	20	15	11	8	6	5	4	3	2	1
Suzuka	25	18	13	10	8	6	5	4	3	2

Rank	Driver	No.	OKA (Japan)	FUJ (Japan)	SEP (Malaysia)	SUG (Japan)	SUZ (Japan)	FUJ (Japan)	AUT (Japan)	MOT (Japan)	Pts.
1	(Japan) Masataka Yanagida (Italy) Ronnie Quintarelli	1	7	7	14	3	1	2	1	2	93
2	(Japan) Yuji Tachikawa (Japan) Kohei Hirate	38	1	8	2	5	9	8	7	1	74
3	(Japan) Juichi Wakisaka (Japan) Hiroaki Ishiura	39	9	1	4	4	Ret	6	5	5	57
4	(Japan) Tsugio Matsuda (Brazil) João Paulo de Oliveira	12	10	5	5	Ret	4	1	10	10	45
5	(Japan) Takuya Izawa (Japan) Naoki Yamamoto	100	2	2	6	8	11	12	8	9	43
6	(Japan) Takashi Kogure (Netherlands) Carlo van Dam	18	7	9	1	7	8	Ret	9	7	40
7	(Japan) Kazuki Nakajima	36	5	4	13	2	Ret	4	15	8	40
8	(Japan) Satoshi Motoyama (Germany) Michael Krumm	23	4	3	8	Ret	5	11	6	6	40
9	(Japan) Seiji Ara (Portugal) André Couto	19	12	13	9	12	6	3	3	5	36
10	(Japan) Daisuke Ito (Japan) Kazuya Oshima	6	13	10	3	1	Ret	10	12	12	33
11	(France) Loïc Duval	36	5		13	2	Ret	4	15	8	32
12	(Japan) Toshihiro Kaneishi (Japan) Koudai Tsukakoshi	17	3	6	7	9	10	5	14	Ret	30
13	(Japan) Yuji Kunimoto (Italy) Andrea Caldarelli	35	Ret	12	10	6	2	7	13	Ret	28
14	(Japan) Ryō Michigami (Japan) Yuhki Nakayama	32	Ret	11	11	11	Ret	14	2	3	26
15	(Japan) Hironobu Yasuda (Sweden) Björn Wirdheim	24	11	14	Ret	10	3	13	4	11	22
16	(Republic of Ireland) Ralph Firman (Japan) Takashi Kobayashi	8	6	Ret	12	Ret	7	9	11	13	12
17	(United Kingdom) Richard Lyons	36		4							8
Rank	Driver	No.	OKA (Japan)	FUJ (Japan)	SEP (Malaysia)	SUG (Japan)	SUZ (Japan)	FUJ (Japan)	AUT (Japan)	MOT (Japan)	Pts.

Colour	Result
Gold	Winner
Silver	Second place
Bronze	Third place
Green	Points classification
Blue	Non-points classification
Blue	Non-classified finish (NC)
Purple	Retired, not classified (Ret)
Red	Did not qualify (DNQ)
Red	Did not pre-qualify (DNPQ)
Black	Disqualified (DSQ)
White	Did not start (DNS)
White	Withdrew (WD)
White	Race cancelled (C)
Blank	Did not practice (DNP)
Blank	Did not arrive (DNA)
Blank	Excluded (EX)

==== GT500 Teams' standings ====
Rank	Team	No.	OKA (Japan)	FUJ (Japan)	SEP (Malaysia)	SUG (Japan)	SUZ (Japan)	FUJ (Japan)	AUT (Japan)	MOT (Japan)	FUJ (Japan)	FUJ (Japan)	Pts.
1	MOLA	1	7	7	14	3	1	2	1	2	1	14	115
2	Lexus Team ZENT Cerumo	38	1	8	2	5	9	8	7	1	13	1	95
3	Lexus Team SARD	39	9	1	4	4	Ret	6	5	5	11	8	78
4	Team Impul	12	10	5	5	Ret	4	1	10	10	6	11	65
5	Team Kunimitsu	100	2	2	6	8	11	12	8	9	5	3	64
6	Nismo	23	4	3	8	Ret	5	11	6	6	4	4	61
7	Weider Honda Racing	18	7	9	1	7	8	Ret	9	7	7	7	58
8	Lexus Team Petronas TOM'S	36	5	4	13	2	Ret	4	15	8	15	2	57
9	Lexus Team WedsSport Bandoh	19	12	13	9	12	6	3	3	5	14	13	55
10	Lexus Team LeMans ENEOS	6	13	10	3	1	Ret	10	12	12	3	6	50
11	Keihin Real Racing	17	3	6	7	9	10	5	14	Ret	2	15	47
12	Lexus Team KeePer Kraft	35	Ret	12	10	6	2	7	13	Ret	12	10	43
13	Nakajima Racing	32	Ret	11	11	11	Ret	14	2	3	10	12	38
14	Kondo Racing	24	11	14	Ret	10	3	13	4	11	9	5	38
15	Autobacs Racing Team Aguri	8	6	Ret	12	Ret	7	9	11	13	8	9	25
Rank	Team	No.	OKA (Japan)	FUJ (Japan)	SEP (Malaysia)	SUG (Japan)	SUZ (Japan)	FUJ (Japan)	AUT (Japan)	MOT (Japan)	FUJ (Japan)	FUJ (Japan)	Pts.

=== GT300 Drivers ===
Scoring system

Position	1st	2nd	3rd	4th	5th	6th	7th	8th	9th	10th
Points	20	15	11	8	6	5	4	3	2	1
Suzuka	25	18	13	10	8	6	5	4	3	2

Rank	Driver	No.	OKA (Japan)	FUJ (Japan)	SEP (Malaysia)	SUG (Japan)	SUZ (Japan)	FUJ (Japan)	AUT (Japan)	MOT (Japan)	Pts.
1	(Japan) Kyosuke Mineo (Japan) Naoki Yokomizo	911	2	8	2	5	Ret	4	2	1	82
2	(Japan) Hiroki Yoshimoto (Japan) Kazuki Hoshino	66	11	3	3	Ret	1	Ret	1	5	73
3	(Japan) Masami Kageyama (Japan) Tomonobu Fujii	33	5	Ret	1	4	6	1	3	7	75
4	(Japan) Katsumasa Chiyo	3	19	18	4	1	2	9	19	6	53
5	(Japan) Nobuteru Taniguchi (Japan) Tatsuya Kataoka	0	3	1	12	7	Ret	8	5	4	52
6	(Japan) Yuhi Sekiguchi	3	19	18	4	1	2		19	6	51
7	(Japan) Tetsuya Tanaka (Japan) Katsuyuki Hiranaka	11	1	5	7	6	5	7	16	13	47
8	(Japan) Manabu Orido (Japan) Takayuki Aoki	88	17	Ret	Ret	3	3	Ret	7	3	39
9	(Japan) Shinichi Takagi (Japan) Kosuke Matsuura	43	6	4	9	9	4	5	17	21	33
10	(Japan) Morio Nitta (Japan) Koki Saga	31	Ret	6	Ret	8	Ret	2	8	Ret	26
11	(Japan) Kazuho Takahashi (Japan) Hiroki Katoh	2	7	2	5	Ret	15	13	DNQ	16	25
12	(Japan) Hironori Takeuchi	52	12	10	6	2	Ret	DNS	Ret	8	24
12	(Japan) Haruki Kurosawa	52	12	10	6	2	Ret		Ret	8	24
13	(Japan) Hideki Yamauchi (Japan) Koji Yamanishi	87	21	7	16	19	Ret	Ret	Ret	2	19
14	(Japan) Tetsuya Yamano (Japan) Kota Sasaki	61	Ret	9	8	10	Ret	6	4	15	19
15	(Japan) Hideki Mutoh (Japan) Daisuke Nakajima	16				16	11	3	10	11	12
16	(Japan) Akihiro Tsuzuki	21	9	15	14	Ret	14	Ret	6	9	9
17	(Japan) Takeshi Tsuchiya	15/52	4	Ret				DNS			8
18	(Germany) Tim Bergmeister	15	4	Ret							8
19	(Japan) Yuki Iwasaki (Japan) Yuya Sakamoto	30	8	13	11	14	9	10	14	10	8
20	(United Kingdom) Richard Lyons	21					14	Ret	6	9	7
21	(Japan) Yutaka Yamagishi (Japan) Takuto Iguchi	27	10	17	13	18	8	14	9	14	7
22	(Japan) Taku Bamba (Japan) Masahiro Sasaki	4	15	11	10	11	7	11	12	17	6
23	(Switzerland) Cyndie Allemann	21	9	15	14	Ret	14				2
24	(Japan) Daiki Sasaki	3					2	9			2
25	(Japan) Yuya Sakamoto	85	14	Ret			10	18	15		2
26	(Japan) Ryohei Sakaguchi	85		Ret			10				2
-	(Japan) Hiroki Yoshida	69/66			Ret		1				0
-	(Japan) Keita Sawa	88					3				0
-	(Japan) Atsushi Yogo	11					5				0
-	(Japan) Kenji Kobayashi	20/30/77		16			9			18	0
-	(Japan) Tetsuji Tamanaka (Japan) Masayuki Ueda	5	20			12	Ret	17	11	12	0
-	(Japan) Hisashi Wada (Japan) Masaki Jyonai	22	16	12	18		12	16	18		0
-	(Japan) Ryo Orime	14				13	13	12	13	Ret	0
-	(Switzerland) Alexandre Imperatori	14				13	13	12			0
-	(Japan) Atsushi Tanaka	360	13	Ret	17	17		Ret	20	20	0
-	(Japan) Yasushi Kikuchi	360	13								0
-	(Japan) Naoya Yamano	14							13	Ret	0
-	(Japan) Masaki Kano	85	14	Ret							0
-	(Japan) Hideshi Matsuda	86/85	Ret	14	DNS	15	Ret	Ret	15		0
-	(Japan) Junichiro Yamashita	86	Ret	14	DNS	15	Ret				0
-	(Japan) Yukinori Taniguchi	21		15							0
-	(Hong Kong) Frank Yu	20/99		16	15				Ret		0
-	(Japan) Hideto Yasuoka	99			15		Ret		Ret		0
-	(Japan) Hiroshi Hamaguchi	2					15				0
-	(Japan) Hiroshi Takamori (Japan) Shogo Mitsuyama	48	Ret	Ret		20	16	15		19	0
-	(Japan) Hideki Noda	20	18	16							0
-	(Japan) Keiichi Inoue	48		Ret			16				0
-	(Japan) Takuya Shirasaka	360		Ret	17	17		Ret	20	20	0
-	(United States) Michael Kim	20/99	18				Ret				0
-	(Ukraine) Igor Sushko	77								18	0
-	(Germany) Jörg Bergmeister	15		Ret							0
-	(Malaysia) Fairuz Fauzy	69			Ret						0
-	(Japan) Akihiko Nakaya	52					Ret				0
-	(Japan) Yuichi Nakayama	31					Ret				0
-	(Japan) Yoshio Tsuzuki	99					Ret				0
Rank	Driver	No.	OKA (Japan)	FUJ (Japan)	SEP (Malaysia)	SUG (Japan)	SUZ (Japan)	FUJ (Japan)	AUT (Japan)	MOT (Japan)	Pts.

Colour	Result
Gold	Winner
Silver	Second place
Bronze	Third place
Green	Points classification
Blue	Non-points classification
Blue	Non-classified finish (NC)
Purple	Retired, not classified (Ret)
Red	Did not qualify (DNQ)
Red	Did not pre-qualify (DNPQ)
Black	Disqualified (DSQ)
White	Did not start (DNS)
White	Withdrew (WD)
White	Race cancelled (C)
Blank	Did not practice (DNP)
Blank	Did not arrive (DNA)
Blank	Excluded (EX)

==== GT300 Teams' standings ====
Rank	Team	No.	OKA (Japan)	FUJ (Japan)	SEP (Malaysia)	SUG (Japan)	SUZ (Japan)	FUJ (Japan)	AUT (Japan)	MOT (Japan)	FUJ (Japan)	FUJ (Japan)	Pts.
1	Team Taisan ENDLESS	911	2	8	2	5	Ret	4	2	1	8	18	103
2	Hankook KTR	33	5	Ret	1	4	6	1	3	7	1	14	94
3	A speed	66	11	3	3	Ret	1	Ret	1	5	14	1	89
4	GSR & Studie with Team Ukyo	0	3	1	12	7	Ret	8	5	4	5	20	73
5	NDDP Racing	3	19	18	4	1	2	9	19	6	4	19	71
6	Gainer	11	1	5	7	6	5	7	16	13	7	6	65
7	JLOC	88	17	Ret	Ret	3	3	Ret	7	3	12	3	52
8	Autobacs Racing Team Aguri	43	6	4	9	9	4	5	17	21	3	9	51
9	apr	31	Ret	6	Ret	8	Ret	2	8	Ret	11	5	38
10	Cars Tokai Dream28	2	7	2	5	Ret	15	13	DNQ	16	18	2	35
11	Green Tec & Leon with Shift	52	12	10	6	2	Ret	DNS	Ret	8	6	4	35
12	R&D Sport	61	Ret	9	8	10	Ret	6	4	15	19	16	33
13	JLOC	87	21	7	16	19	Ret	Ret	Ret	2	15	8	28
14	Team Mugen	16				16	11	3	10	11	2	7	23
15	GSR & Studie with Team Ukyo	4	15	11	10	11	7	11	12	17	17	12	22
16	apr	30	8	13	11	14	9	10	14	10	23	10	22
17	Hitotsuyama Racing	21	9	15	14	Ret	14	Ret	6	9	Ret	11	21
18	LMP Motorsport	27	10	17	13	18	8	14	9	14			19
19	Team Art Taste	15	4	Ret									11
20	Team Mach	5	20			12	Ret	17	11	12	21	Ret	11
21	JLOC	85	14	Ret			10	18	15				6
22	R'QS Motorsports	22	16	12	18		12	16	18		22	13	6
23	Team SGC	14				13	13	12	13	Ret	13	Ret	6
24	Tomei Sports	360	13	Ret	17	17		Ret	20	20	10	Ret	5
25	Dijon Racing	48	Ret	Ret		20	16	15		19	20	15	4
26	Hitotsuyama Racing	99			15		Ret		Ret				3
27	JLOC	86	Ret	14	DNS	15	Ret				16	17	2
28	Hitotsuyama Racing	20	18	16									2
29	Hitotsuyama Racing	77								18	9	Ret	1
-	Thunder Asia Racing	69			Ret								0
Rank	Team	No.	OKA (Japan)	FUJ (Japan)	SEP (Malaysia)	SUG (Japan)	SUZ (Japan)	FUJ (Japan)	AUT (Japan)	MOT (Japan)	FUJ (Japan)	FUJ (Japan)	Pts.

== JAF Grand Prix ==
=== GT500 Drivers ===
Rank	No.	Team	Race 1 Driver	Race 2 Driver	Race 1	Race 2	PTS
1	38	Lexus Team ZENT Cerumo	(Japan) Kohei Hirate	(Japan) Yuji Tachikawa	12	1	20
2	36	Lexus Team Petronas TOM'S	(France) Loïc Duval	(Japan) Kazuki Nakajima	15	2	15
3	100	Raybrig Team Kunimitsu	(Japan) Naoki Yamamoto	(Japan) Takuya Izawa	5	3	14
4	23	Motul Autech NISMO	(Germany) Michael Krumm	(Japan) Satoshi Motoyama	4	4	12
5	6	Lexus Team ENEOS LeMans	(Japan) Kazuya Oshima	(Japan) Daisuke Ito	3	6	10.5
6	1	S-Road REITO MOLA	(Italy) Ronnie Quintarelli	(Japan) Masataka Yanagida	1	14	10
7	17	Keihin Real Racing	(Japan) Koudai Tsukakoshi	(Japan) Toshihiro Kaneishi	2	15	7.5
8	24	D'Station ADVAN Kondo Racing	(Japan) Hironobu Yasuda	(Sweden) Björn Wirdheim	9	5	7
9	18	Weider Honda Racing	(Netherlands) Carlo van Dam	(Japan) Takashi Kogure	7	7	6
10	8	Autobacs Racing Team Aguri	(Japan) Takashi Kobayashi	(Republic of Ireland) Ralph Firman	8	9	3.5
11	39	Lexus Team DENSO SARD	(Japan) Hiroaki Ishiura	(Japan) Juichi Wakisaka	11	8	3
12	12	Calsonic Team Impul	(Brazil) João Paulo de Oliveira	(Japan) Tsugio Matsuda	6	11	2.5
13	35	Lexus Team KeePer Kraft	(Japan) Yuji Kunimoto	(Italy) Andrea Caldarelli	12	10	1
14	32	EPSON Nakajima Racing	(Japan) Yuhki Nakayama	(Japan) Ryō Michigami	10	12	0.5
15	19	Lexus Team WedsSport Bandoh	(Japan) Seiji Ara	(United Kingdom) Marino Franchitti	14	13	0
Rank	No.	Team	Race 1 Driver	Race 2 Driver	Race 1	Race 2	PTS

=== GT300 Drivers ===
Rank	No.	Team	Race 1 Driver	Race 2 Driver	Race 1	Race 2	PTS
1	33	Hankook KTR	(Japan) Tomonobu Fujii	(Japan) Masami Kageyama	1	14	20
2	66	A speed	(Japan) Kazuki Hoshino	(Japan) Hiroki Yoshimoto	14	1	20
3	16	Team Mugen	(Japan) Daisuke Nakajima	(Japan) Hideki Mutoh	2	7	19
4	2	Evangelion-01 Cars Tokai Dream28	(Japan) Kazuho Takahashi	(Japan) Hiroki Kato	18	2	15
5	43	Autobacs Racing Team Aguri	(Japan) Kosuke Matsuura	(Japan) Shinichi Takagi	3	9	13
6	52	Green Tec & Leon with Shift	(Japan) Haruki Kurosawa	(Japan) Hironori Takeuchi	6	4	13
7	88	MonePa JLOC	(Japan) Takayuki Aoki	(Japan) Manabu Orido	12	3	11
8	11	Gainer	(Japan) Katsuyuki Hiranaka	(Japan) Tetsuya Tanaka	7	6	9
9	3	S-Road NDDP	(Japan) Katsumasa Chiyo	(Japan) Yuhi Sekiguchi	4	19	8
10	0	GSR Hatsune Miku	(Japan) Tatsuya Kataoka	(Japan) Nobuteru Taniguchi	5	20	6
11	31	Hasepro apr	(Japan) Koki Saga	(Japan) Morio Nitta	11	5	6
12	911	Team Taisan ENDLESS	(Japan) Kyosuke Mineo	(Japan) Naoki Yokomizo	8	18	3
13	87	JLOC	(Japan) Koji Yamanishi	(Japan) Yuya Sakamoto	15	8	3
14	77	investors Hitotsuyama Racing	(Ukraine) Igor Sushko	(Japan) Kenji Kobayashi	9	Ret	2
15	360	RunUp Tomei Sports	(Japan) Takuya Shirasaka	(Japan) Atsushi Tanaka	10	Ret	1
16	30	Iwasaki Moda apr	(Japan) Yuya Sakamoto	(Japan) Yuki Iwasaki	23	10	1
17	4	GSR Project Mirai	(Japan) Masahiro Sasaki	(Japan) Taku Bamba	17	12	0
18	5	Team Mach	(Japan) Masayuki Ueda	(Japan) Tetsuji Tamanaka	21	Ret	0
19	14	Team SGC	(Japan) Ryo Orime	(Japan) Naoya Yamano	13	Ret	0
20	21	ZENT Hitotsuyama Racing	(United Kingdom) Richard Lyons	(Japan) Akihiro Tsuzuki	DNS	11	0
21	22	R'Qs Motorsports	(Japan) Masaki Jyonai	(Japan) Hisashi Wada	22	13	0
22	48	NEON Dijon Racing	(Japan) Shogo Mitsuyama	(Japan) Hiroshi Takamori	20	15	0
23	61	R&D Sport	(Japan) Kota Sasaki	(Japan) Tetsuya Yamano	19	16	0
24	86	Verity BOMEX JLOC	(Japan) Junichiro Yamashita	(Japan) Hideshi Matsuda	16	17	0
Rank	No.	Team	Race 1 Driver	Race 2 Driver	Race 1	Race 2	PTS
