= Takashi Kobayashi (racing driver) =

Japanese racing driver

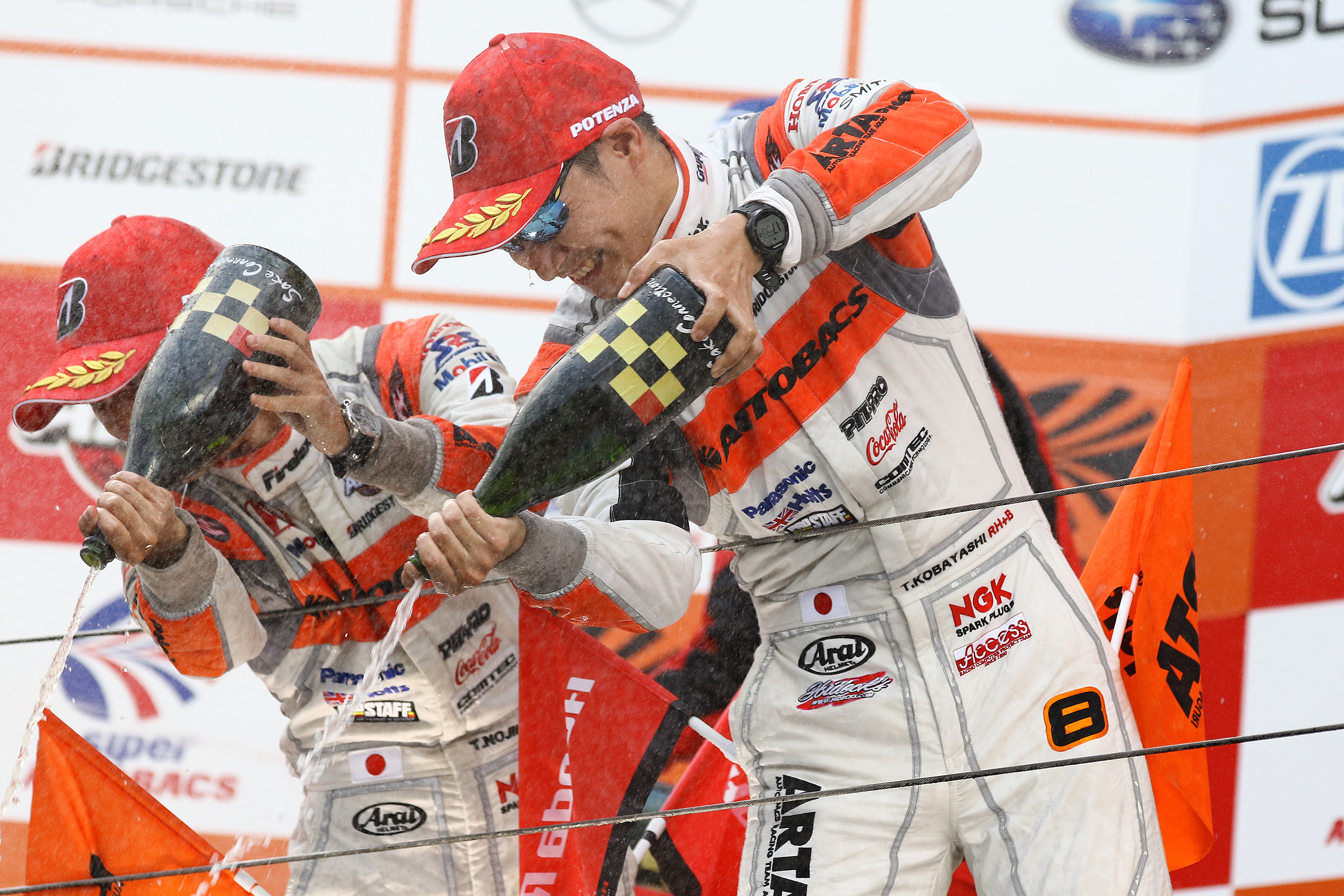
- Kobayashi (right) at Fuji Speedway for Super GT Rd.5 in 2017
- Nationality: Japanese
- Born: November 8, 1987 (age 39) Hiroshima

Super GT Formula Nippon career
- Debut season: 2010 (GT500)
- Current team: Autobacs Racing Team Aguri
- Categorisation: FIA Gold
- Car number: 8
- Starts: 1
- Wins: 1

Previous series
- 2009–2010: All-Japan Formula Three

Takashi Kobayashi (小林 崇志, Kobayashi Takashi; born November 8, 1987 in Hiroshima) is a Japanese racing driver. He currently drives in the Formula Nippon, and the Super GT series in the GT500 category. He is not related to fellow Japanese driver Kamui Kobayashi.

In 2010, Kobayashi won the All-Japan Formula Three championship, National Class.

In 2010, Kobayashi made his debut in the Super GT series (GT500) at the Pokka GT Summer Special (Suzuka Circuit) as the third driver of the ARTA. Despite the team mistakenly declaring him to qualify instead of Ralph Firman in the final session, he claimed the pole position, being the first to do so on a debut. the ARTA team won the race the following day.

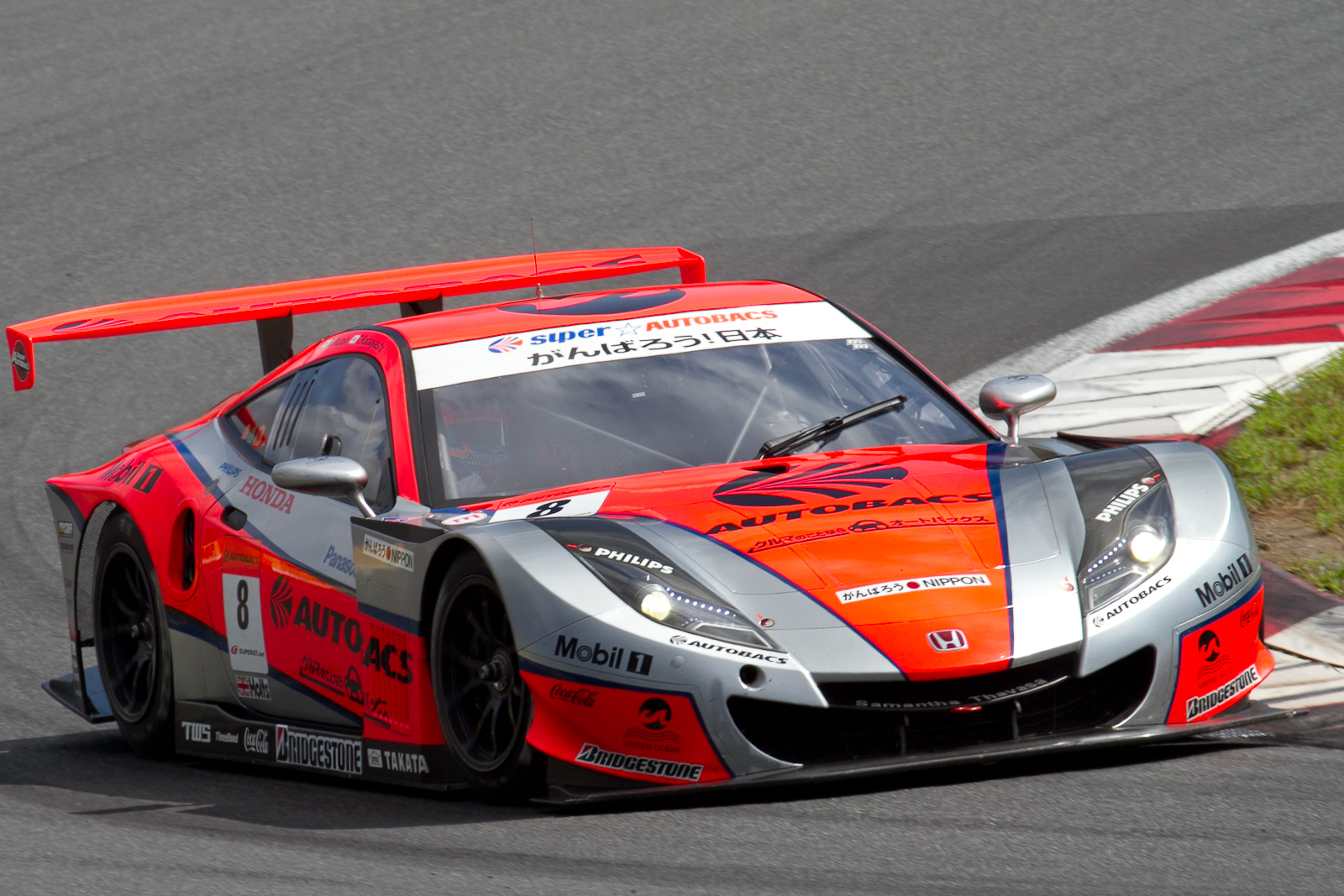
Kobayashi driving the Honda HSV-010 GT for ARTA in 2011

Kobayashi's performance led to him becoming part of the new lineup of ARTA in the 2011 Super GT season, partnered with former IndyCar Series driver Hideki Mutoh.

== Racing record ==
=== Complete Japanese Formula 3 results ===
(key) (Races in bold indicate pole position) (Races in italics indicate fastest lap)

Year	Team	Engine	Class	1	2	3	4	5	6	7	8	9	10	11	12	13	14	15	16	DC	Pts
2009	HFDP Racing	Toyota	N	FUJ; 1; 9	FUJ; 2; 11	OKA; 1; 6	OKA; 2; 7	SUZ; 1; 11	SUZ; 2; 10	FUJ; 1; 9	FUJ; 2; 9	SUZ; 1; 9	SUZ; 2; 9	MOT; 1; 13	MOT; 2; 14	AUT; 1; 11	AUT; 2; 10	SUG; 1; 13	SUG; 2; 7	4th	62
2010	HFDP Racing	Toyota	N	**SUZ**; **1**; 7	**SUZ**; **2**; 6	MOT; 1; 8	**MOT**; **2**; 5	**FUJ**; **1**; 6	FUJ; 2; 6	FUJ; 1; 8	FUJ; 2; 7	MOT; 1; 8	**MOT**; **2**; 11	**OKA**; **1**; 7	OKA; 2; 8	**SUG**; **1**; 7	SUG; 2; 10	AUT; 1; 6	AUT; 2 Ret	1st	124

=== Complete Super GT results ===
Year	Team	Car	Class	1	2	3	4	5	6	7	8	9	DC	Pts
2010	Autobacs Racing Team Aguri	Honda HSV-010 GT	GT500	SUZ	OKA	FUJ	SEP	SUG	SUZ; 1	FUJ	MOT		NC	0
2011	Autobacs Racing Team Aguri	Honda HSV-010 GT	GT500	OKA; 12	FUJ; 9	SEP; 9	SUG; 10	SUZ; 9	FUJ; 14	AUT; 12	MOT; 13		15th	7
2012	Autobacs Racing Team Aguri	Honda HSV-010 GT	GT500	OKA; 6	FUJ; Ret	SEP; 12	SUG; Ret	SUZ; 7	FUJ; 9	AUT; 11	MOT; 13		16th	12
2013	Autobacs Racing Team Aguri	Honda CR-Z	GT300	OKA; 12	FUJ; 19	SEP; 1	SUG; 1	SUZ; Ret	FUJ; 16	FUJ; Ret	AUT; 16	MOT; 15	7th	40
2014	Autobacs Racing Team Aguri	Honda CR-Z	GT300	OKA; 6	FUJ; 18	AUT; 1	SUG; 16	FUJ; 22	**SUZ**; 16	BUR; 13	MOT; 12		11th	25
2015	Autobacs Racing Team Aguri	Honda CR-Z	GT300	OKA; 2	FUJ; 17	CHA; 10	**FUJ**; 1	SUZ; 12	SUG; 12	AUT; 6	MOT; 4		6th	49
2016	Autobacs Racing Team Aguri	BMW M6 GT3	GT300	OKA; 11	FUJ; 2	SUG ret	**FUJ**; 1	SUZ; 14	CHA; 3	MOT ret	MOT; DNS		5th	48
2017	Autobacs Racing Team Aguri	Honda NSX-GT	GT500	OKA; **DNS**	FUJ; 9	AUT ret	**FUJ**; 5	SUZ; 1	SUG; 8	CHA; 11	MOT; 9		9th	37
2018	Team UpGarage	Toyota 86 MC	GT300	OKA; 1	FUJ; 13	SUZ; 6	CHA; 18	**FUJ**; 9	SUG; 11	AUT; 27	MOT ret		12th	28
2019	Team UpGarage	Honda NSX GT3	GT300	OKA; 11	FUJ; 12	SUZ; 15	CHA; 24	**FUJ**; 4	SUG; 9	AUT; 10	MOT; 19		22nd	13
2020	Team UpGarage	Honda NSX GT3 Evo	GT300	FUJ; 22	FUJ; 18	SUZ; 2	MOT; 14	FUJ; 18	SUZ; Ret	MOT; 16	FUJ; 25		15th	15
2021	Team UpGarage	Honda NSX GT3 Evo	GT300	OKA; 11	FUJ; 9	SUZ; 10	MOT; **DNS**	SUG; 12	AUT; 16	MOT; Ret	FUJ; Ret		25th	4
2022	Team UpGarage	Honda NSX GT3 Evo	GT300	OKA; 2	FUJ; 13	SUZ; Ret	FUJ; 3	SUZ; 14	SUG; 11	AUT; 19	MOT; 4		8th	34
2023	Team UpGarage	Honda NSX GT3 Evo	GT300	OKA; 1	FUJ; Ret	SUZ; Ret	FUJ; 17	SUZ; 1	SUG; DSQ	AUT; 17	MOT; 8		5th	43
2024	Team UpGarage	Honda NSX GT3 Evo	GT300	OKA; 16	FUJ; 7	SUZ; 13	FUJ; 16	SUG; 16	AUT; 15	MOT; 3^{3}	SUZ; 24		14th	16
2025	Team UpGarage	Mercedes-AMG GT3 Evo	GT300	OKA; 21	FUJ; 23	**SEP**; 1	FS1; 10	FS2 (7)	SUZ; 11	SUG; 7	AUT; 8	MOT; 10	11th	61.5
2026	Team UpGarage	Mercedes-AMG GT3 Evo	GT300	OKA; 18	FUJ; 27†	FUJ; 12	SUZ; 3	SUG; 5	AUT; 5	MOT; 23†	MOT; 11		13th	47

^{‡} Half points awarded as less than 75% of race distance was completed.
^{(Number)} Driver did not take part in this sprint race, points are still awarded for the teammate's result.
^{*} Season still in progress.
