= Autobacs Seven =

Japanese automotive retailer

Autobacs Seven Co., Ltd.
- Native name: 株式会社オートバックスセブン
- Romanized name: Kabushiki-gaisha Ōtobakkusu Sebun
- Formerly: Suehiro Shokai (1947–1980)
- Company type: Public KK
- Traded as: TYO: 9832
- Industry: Retail
- Founded: February 1947 (incorporated on August 12, 1948)
- Founder: Toshio Sumino
- Headquarters: Toyosu, Koto, Tokyo, Japan
- Key people: Yoshio Kobayashi (President, CEO & General Manager)
- Products: Automobiles; Automotive parts
- Brands: Autobacs; Super Autobacs
- Website: www.autobacs.co.jp

Autobacs Seven Co., Ltd. (株式会社オートバックスセブン, Kabushiki-gaisha Ōtobakkusu Sebun) (TYO: 9832) is a retailer of automotive parts and accessories based in Japan, with branches primarily in Asia and stores also located in France.

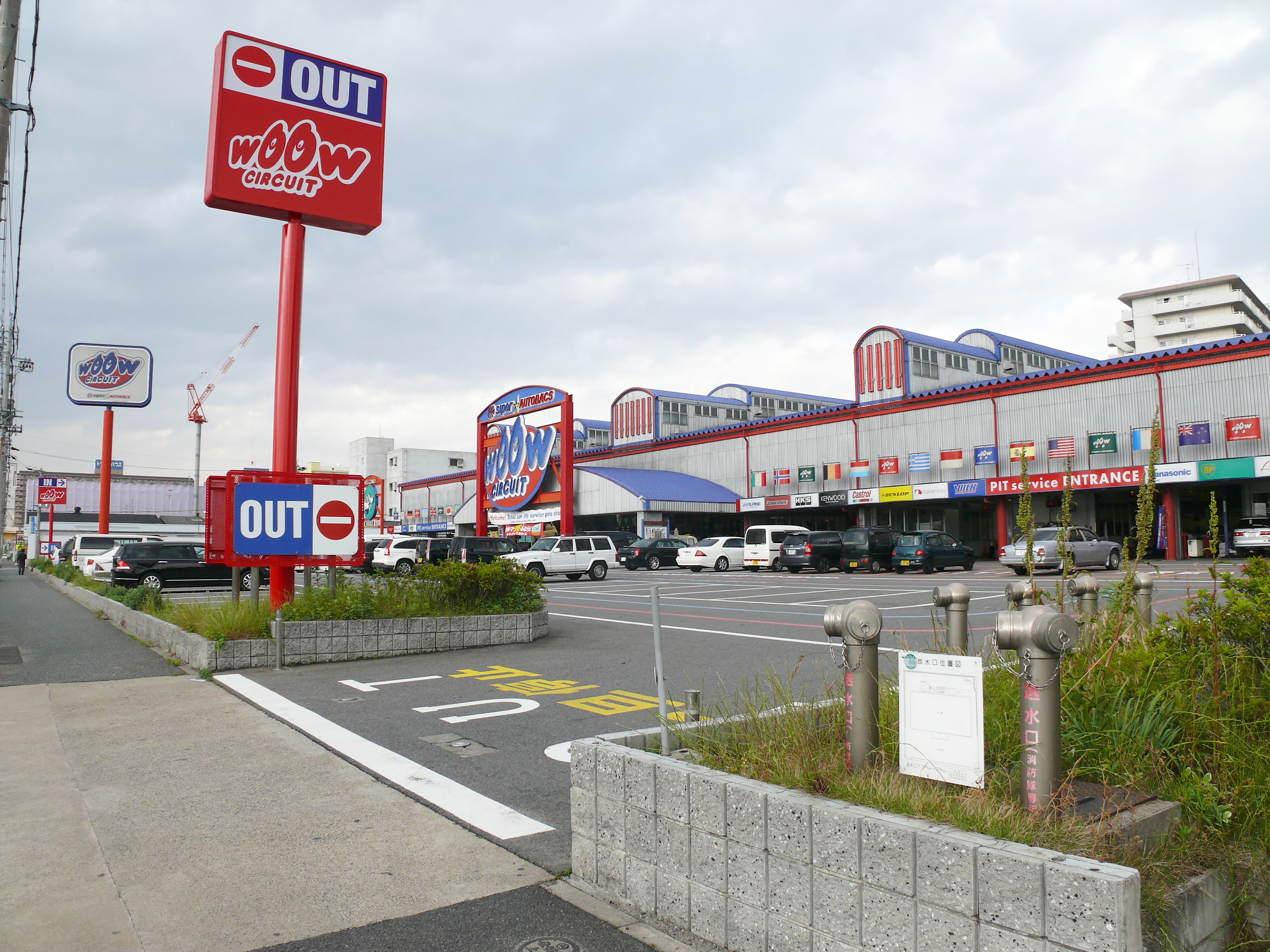
Super Autobacs in Nagoya

== Etymology ==
Autobacs was given a backronym as follows, which reflects the products the company provided prior to its renaming to Autobacs in 1980:

- AUTO: Appeal, Unique, Tire, Oil
- BACS: Battery, Accessory, Car electronics, Service

"Seven" in the company name is said to reflect Autobacs's philosophy of searching for seventh products for customers.

== History ==
Autobacs was founded by Toshio Sumino in 1947 in Fukushima-ku, Osaka as Suehiro Shokai Co., Ltd., which was reorganized into Fuji Shokai Co., Ltd. a year later.

In 1960, Sumino opened the Fuji Drive Shop, Japan's first large-scale automotive goods store, and in 1969 he became involved in motorsport sponsorship by sponsoring a car in the Japanese Grand Prix.

In 1974, the first of the Autobacs stores, the "Autobacs Higashi Osaka Store", was opened in Daitō, Osaka. The following year, Autobacs would run its first franchisee store, the "Autobacs Hakodate Nakamichi Store" in Hakodate, Hokkaidō. In 1977, Autobacs would start to develop and sell its own motor oil and tires to be sold in its own stores. At the end of the decade, Autobacs opened its 100th store, and in 1984 opened its 200th store. The company's name was officially changed from Fuji Shokai to Autobacs in March of 1980.

On 11 July 2005, Autobacs entered a collaboration agreement with UK retailer Halfords. On 13 December 2005, Autobacs acquired 5% of the company (11,400,000 shares) at approximately ¥7.5 billion.

=== ASL ===
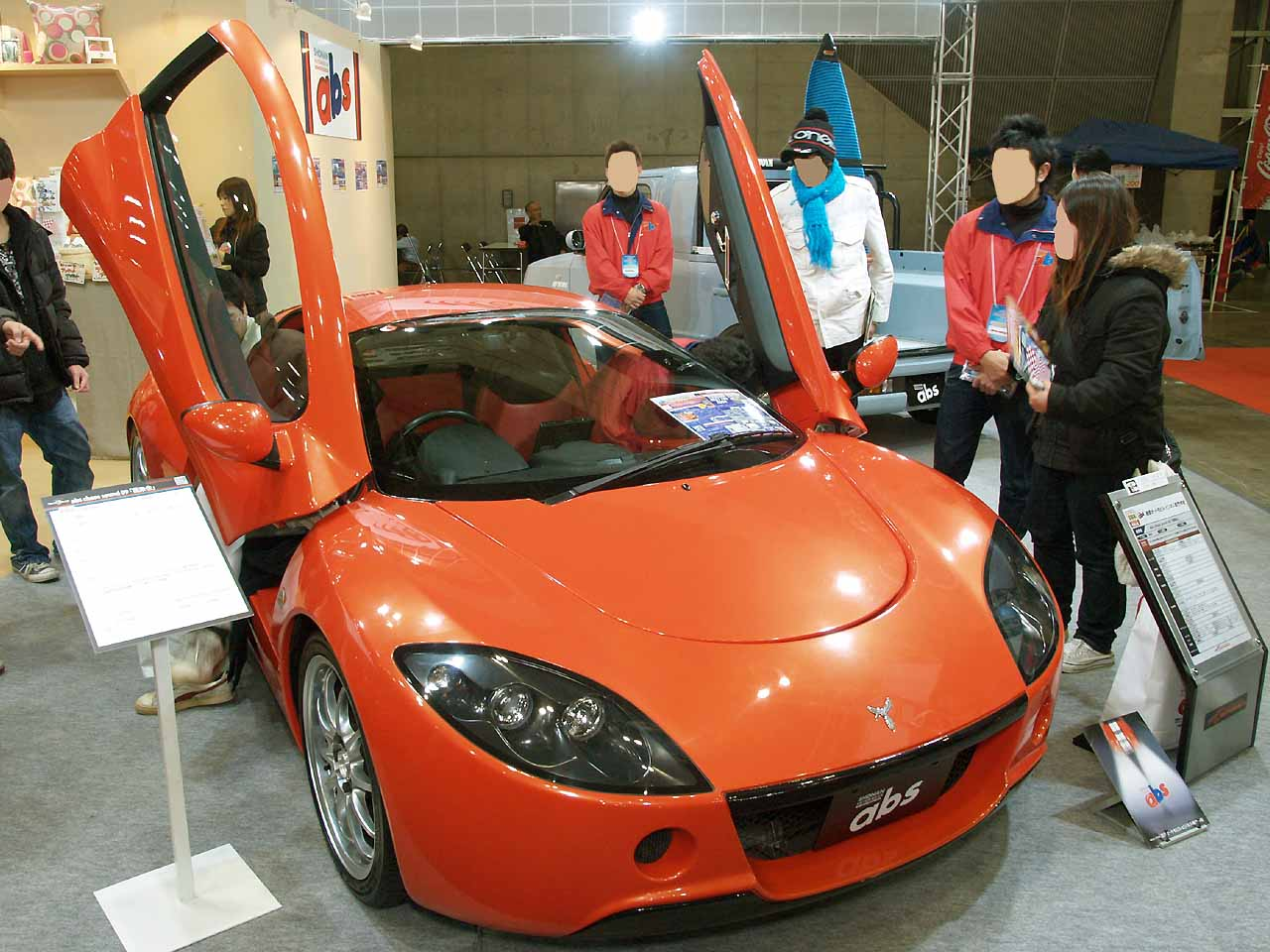
ASL Garaiya front, with doors open

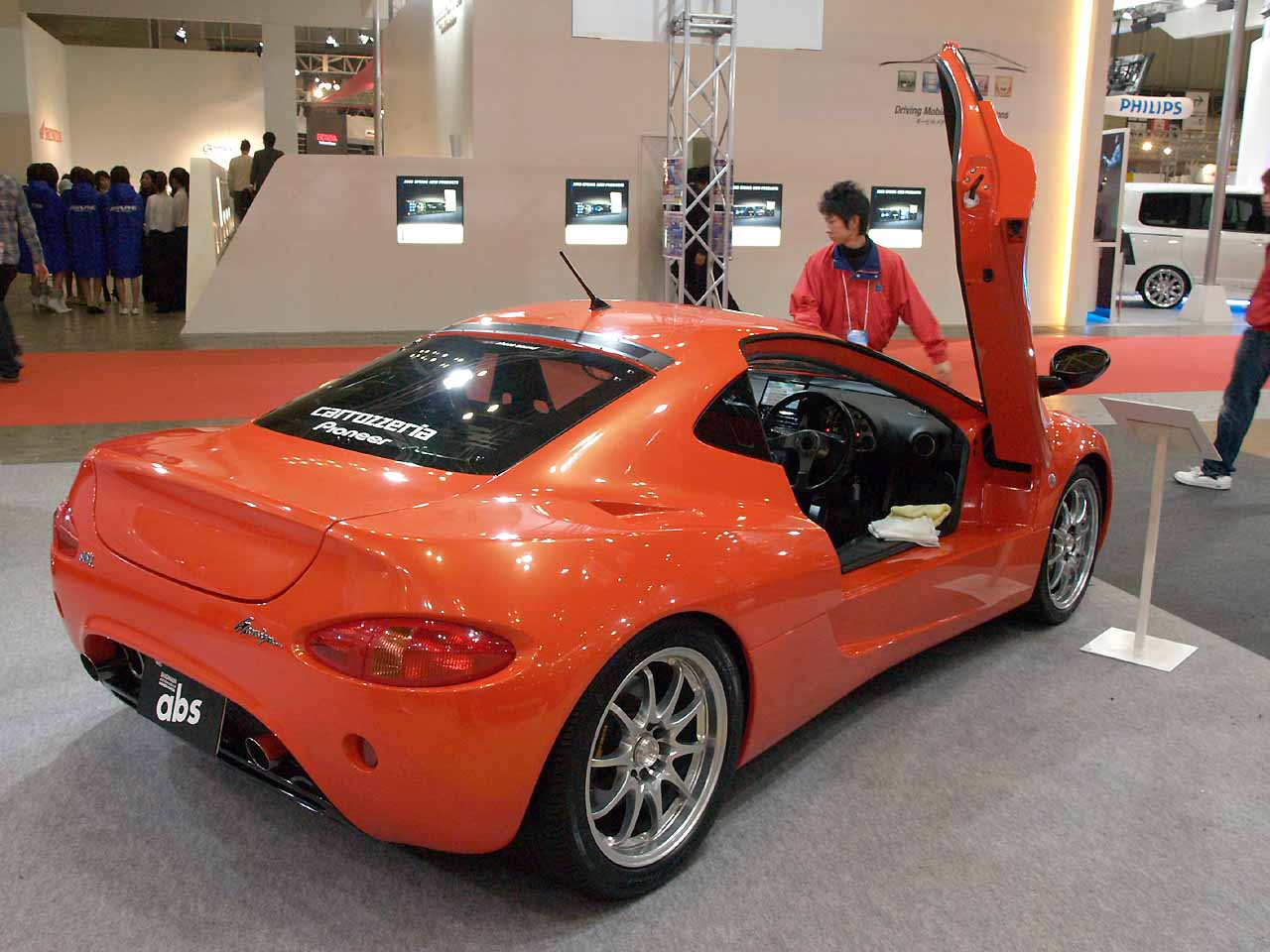
ASL Garaiya rear

In the late 1990s, specialty car manufacturer Tommykaira ran into financial difficulties as a result of the Lost Decade. In 2001, it was acquired by Autobacs, which renamed its car manufacturing arm ASL (Autobacs Sportscar Laboratory), thus allowing the aftermarket parts manufacturer to continue trading with its usual name.

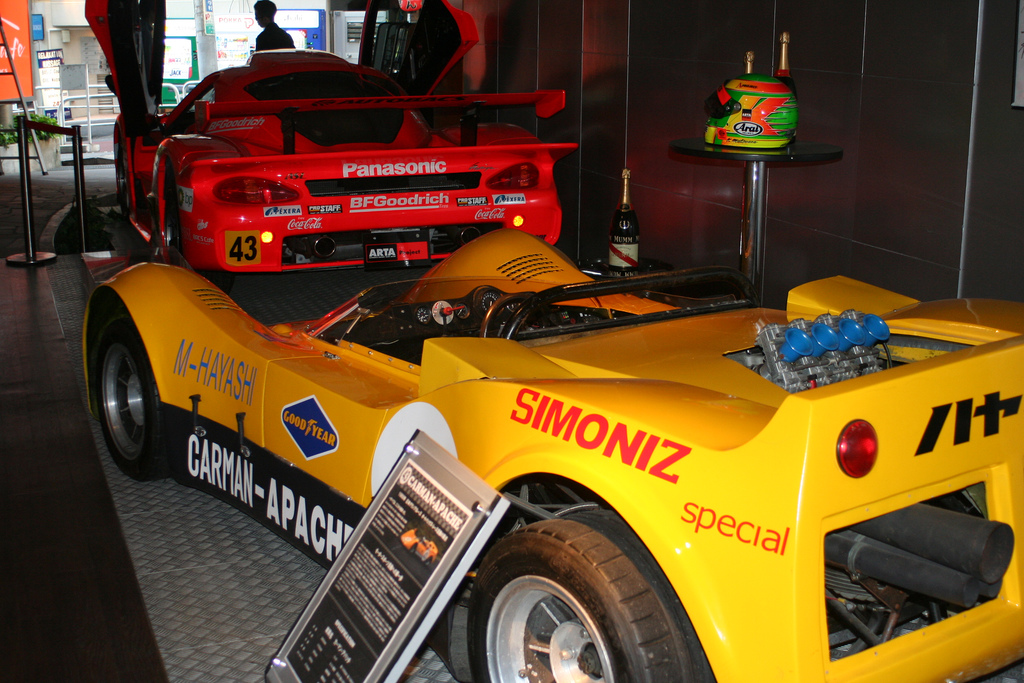
Autobacs Bar lobby (Roppongi, Tokyo) featuring an Autobacs Garaiya GT300 and the 1969 Carman-Apache

The first car planned to be produced by ASL was the Garaiya. As none were sold, there is not much known about ASL nor the Garaiya, only that it is a small sports car based on the Tommykaira ZZ, with an output of around 180 hp (130 kW) from a Nissan SR20VE engine and a weight of approximately 900 kg (2,000 lb). Customers would take part in the final development of their car's suspension to tailor it to their preferences or driving style.

A modified Garaiya was fielded in the GT300 class of Super GT from 2003 through 2012 by Autobacs Racing Team Aguri, a team formed by Autobacs and Japanese former F1 driver Aguri Suzuki. After the Super GT rule changes in 2012 that prohibited low-volume production cars from entering races, the Garaiya is no longer able to race in the series.

Similarly, the Garaiya RS01 (also known as simply the RS01) was a second attempt at the ZZII, which was to be a larger and faster accompaniment to the ZZ with a variety of engines ranging from 2.0 to 3.5 litres to fit various racing regulations, as it was designed to be an FIA-spec racing car with a road version and a target weight of 1,000 kg (2,200 lb). The prototype was fitted with a modified RB26DETT engine producing 542 hp (404 kW) and also featured the R34 Skyline GT-R's ATTESA E-TS Pro all-wheel drive system.
