= Kota Sasaki =

Japanese racing driver

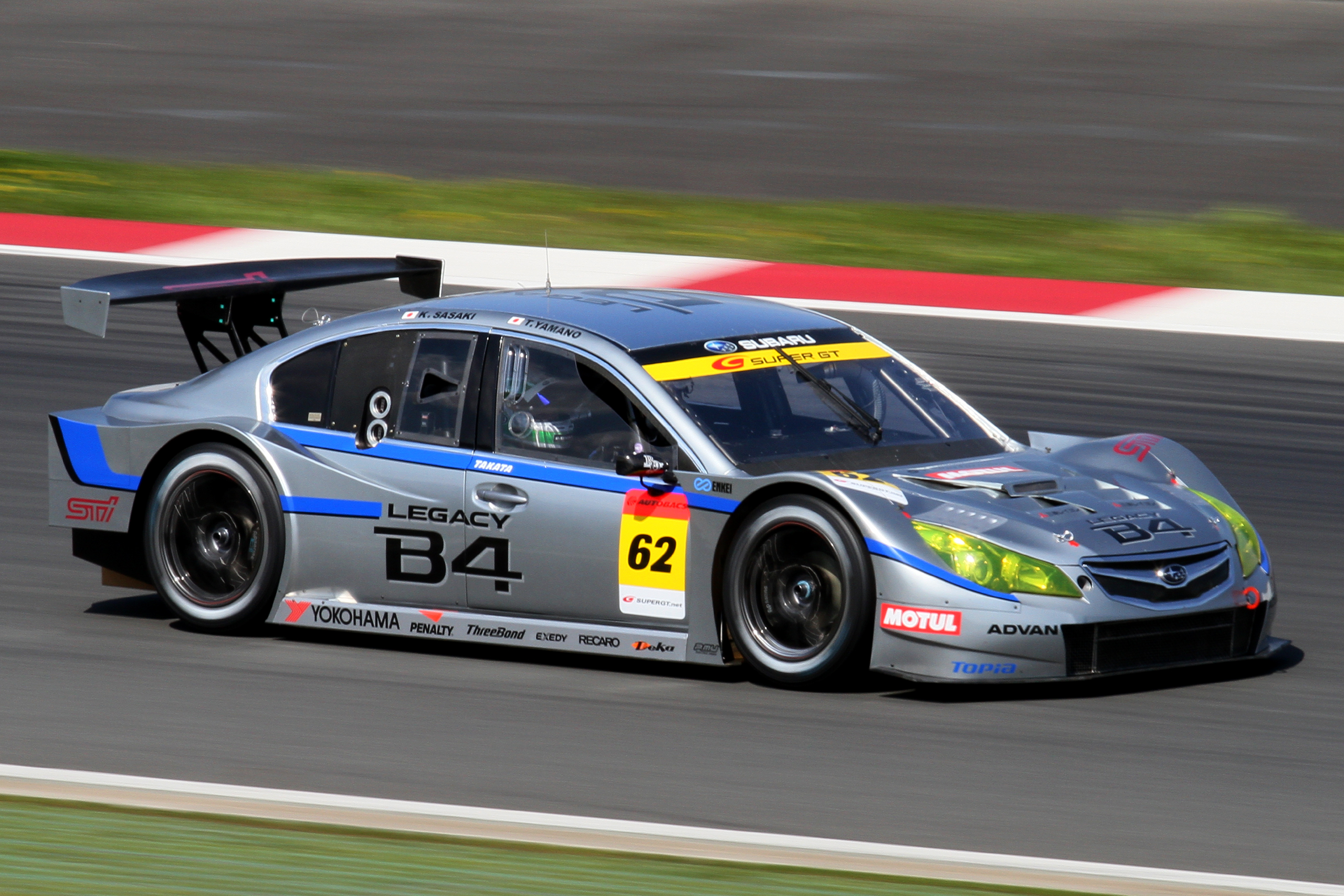
- Kota Sasaki (R&D Sport) driving the R&D Sport Legacy B4 (2WD/FR) during qualify session.
- Born: January 26, 1973 (age 53); Japan
- Occupation: Racing driver

Kota Sasaki (佐々木 孝太, Sasaki Kōta; born January 26, 1973 in Mie) is a Japanese racing driver who was the 2005 Super GT champion for the GT300 category. He raced a Toyota MR-S with Tetsuya Yamano to win the 2005 title. He also won the 1998 and 2023 Japan Formula 4 title.

== 2008 Aston Martin Asia Cup season ==
On 13–14 December, Sasaki took the 2008 Aston Martin Asia Cup title with a double win in the final rounds held at the Zhuhai International Circuit, China. In taking the AMAC title, Sasaki was rewarded with a fully sponsored season in a Vantage N24 in the 2009 FIA GT4 Championship.
