= 2012 JAF Grand Prix =

Track map of the Fuji Speedway

The 2012 JAF Grand Prix Fuji Sprint Cup was the final racing event for both the 2012 Super GT season and the 2012 Formula Nippon season. It took place over November 17 and November 18, 2012.

== Background ==
Due to commitments in the 2012 Guia Race of Macau, André Couto was replaced in the #19 Lexus Team WedsSport Bandoh by Marino Franchitti. In GT300, due to Hideki Yamauchi racing in the 2012 Macau Grand Prix Formula Three, his seat in the #87 JLOC Lamborghini Gallardo was replaced by Yuya Sakamoto, who had competed in five races in the #85 JLOC entry in 2012. The #27 LMP Motorsport Ferrari F430 GTC was the only team that competed at Motegi that did not enter at Fuji, while the #86 JLOC entry returned after last racing in the 2012 41st International Pokka 1000km.

There were no driver changes in Formula Nippon. It was also the last event that the series name Formula Nippon would be used, as for 2013 it will be renamed to the Japanese Championship Super Formula.

Unlike the eight points-scoring races in Super GT, the Fuji Sprint Cup was run under slightly different rules.

- The GT500 and GT300 classes were split into their own set of two races.
- Each driver in GT500 and GT300 would have their own 22 lap sprint race without any mandatory pitstop.
- Standing starts were also implemented for each of the four races instead of the rolling start normally seen.

=== East versus West ===
There was one final intranational competition. All Japanese drivers, including those in support races, were divided into East and West teams according to the prefectures of their birth; visiting international drivers were randomly assigned to one team by the organizers. The race results of 8 races (4 in Super GT, 1 each in other events), plus bonus points added from sales events outside the circuit would determine the winning team. An extra bonus would be issued to all drivers and supporters on that team.

== GT300 Race 1 results ==
The first GT300 race was held on Saturday November 17.

Pos	No	Team	Driver	Chassis	Tyre	Time/Difference	Laps
1	33	Hankook KTR	(Japan) Tomonobu Fujii	Porsche 911 GT3-R	HK	42:04.613	22
2	16	Team Mugen	(Japan) Daisuke Nakajima	Honda CR-Z	B	+9.022	22
3	43	Autobacs Racing Team Aguri	(Japan) Kosuke Matsuura	ASL Garaiya	B	+12.701	22
4	3	S-Road NDDP	(Japan) Katsumasa Chiyo	Nissan GT-R GT3	Y	+13.048	22
5	0	GSR Hatsune Miku	(Japan) Tatsuya Kataoka	BMW Z4 GT3	Y	+44.177	22
6	52	Green Tec & Leon with Shift	(Japan) Haruki Kurosawa	Mercedes-Benz SLS AMG GT3	Y	+44.531	22
7	11	Gainer	(Japan) Katsuyuki Hiranaka	Audi R8 LMS ultra	D	+49.044	22
8	911	Team Taisan ENDLESS	(Japan) Kyosuke Mineo	Porsche 911 GT3-R	Y	+1:17.826	22
9	77	investors Hitotsuyama Racing	(Ukraine) Igor Sushko	Audi R8 LMS	Y	+1:36.647	22
10	360	RunUp Tomei Sports	(Japan) Takuya Shirasaka	Callaway Corvette Z06.R GT3	Y	+2:27.106	22
11	31	Hasepro apr	(Japan) Koki Saga	Toyota Prius	Y	+1 Lap	21
12	88	MonePa JLOC	(Japan) Takayuki Aoki	Lamborghini Gallardo GT3	Y	+1 Lap	21
13	14	Team SGC	(Japan) Ryo Orime	Lexus IS350	Y	+1 Lap	21
14	66	A speed	(Japan) Kazuki Hoshino	Aston Martin V12 Vantage GT3	Y	+1 Lap	21
15	87	JLOC	(Japan) Koji Yamanishi	Lamborghini Gallardo GT3	Y	+1 Lap	21
16	86	Verity BOMEX JLOC	(Japan) Junichiro Yamashita	Lamborghini Gallardo RG-3	Y	+1 Lap	21
17	4	GSR Project Mirai	(Japan) Masahiro Sasaki	BMW Z4 GT3	Y	+1 Lap	21
18	2	Evangelion-01 Cars Tokai Dream28	(Japan) Kazuho Takahashi	Mooncraft Shiden	Y	+2 Laps	20
19	61	R&D Sport	(Japan) Kota Sasaki	Subaru BRZ	Y	+2 Laps	20
20	48	NEON Dijon Racing	(Japan) Shogo Mitsuyama	Callaway Corvette Z06.R GT3	Y	+2 Laps	20
21	5	Team Mach	(Japan) Masayuki Ueda	Ferrari 458 Italia GT3	Y	+3 Laps	19
22	22	R'Qs Motorsports	(Japan) Masaki Jyonai	Vemac RD350R	Y	+3 Laps	19
23	30	Iwasaki Moda apr	(Japan) Yuya Sakamoto	Audi R8 LMS ultra	Y	+4 Laps	18
DNS	21	ZENT Hitotsuyama Racing	(United Kingdom) Richard Lyons	Audi R8 LMS	Y		

== GT500 Race 1 results ==
The first GT500 race was held on Saturday November 17. Due to heavy rain, the race was halted after 11 of the scheduled 22 laps.

Pos	No	Team	Driver	Chassis	Tyre	Time/Difference	Laps
1	1	S-Road REITO MOLA	(Italy) Ronnie Quintarelli	Nissan GT-R	MI	21:01.979	10
2	17	Keihin Real Racing	(Japan) Koudai Tsukakoshi	Honda HSV-010 GT	B	+0.764	10
3	6	Lexus Team ENEOS LeMans	(Japan) Kazuya Oshima	Lexus SC430	B	+2.726	10
4	23	Motul Autech NISMO	(Germany) Michael Krumm	Nissan GT-R	B	+4.821	10
5	100	Raybrig Team Kunimitsu	(Japan) Naoki Yamamoto	Honda HSV-010 GT	B	+6.046	10
6	12	Calsonic Team Impul	(Brazil) João Paulo de Oliveira	Nissan GT-R	B	+7.672	10
7	18	Weider Honda Racing	(Netherlands) Carlo van Dam	Honda HSV-010 GT	B	+9.649	10
8	8	Autobacs Racing Team Aguri	(Japan) Takashi Kobayashi	Honda HSV-010 GT	B	+11.013	10
9	24	D'Station ADVAN Kondo Racing	(Japan) Hironobu Yasuda	Nissan GT-R	Y	+12.391	10
10	32	EPSON Nakajima Racing	(Japan) Yuhki Nakayama	Honda HSV-010 GT	D	+15.380	10
11	39	Lexus Team DENSO SARD	(Japan) Hiroaki Ishiura	Lexus SC430	MI	+41.838	10
12	35	Lexus Team KeePer Kraft	(Japan) Yuji Kunimoto	Lexus SC430	B	+43.592	10
13	38	Lexus Team ZENT Cerumo	(Japan) Kohei Hirate	Lexus SC430	B	+44.966	10
14	19	Lexus Team WedsSport Bandoh	(Japan) Seiji Ara	Lexus SC430	Y	+45.323	10
15	36	Lexus Team Petronas TOM'S	(France) Loïc Duval	Lexus SC430	B	+3 Laps	7

== Formula Nippon results ==
The Formula Nippon race was held on Sunday November 18.

Pos	No	Team	Driver	Engine	Time/Difference	Laps
1	40	Docomo Team Dandelion Racing	(Japan) Takuya Izawa	Honda HR12E	32:10.212	22
2	19	Team Impul	(Brazil) João Paulo de Oliveira	Toyota RV8K	+0.315	22
3	8	Team Kygnus Sunoco	(France) Loïc Duval	Toyota RV8K	+1.346	22
4	39	Project μ Team Cerumo	(Japan) Yuji Kunimoto	Toyota RV8K	+4.593	22
5	20	Team Impul	(Japan) Tsugio Matsuda	Toyota RV8K	+5.420	22
6	38	Project μ Team Cerumo	(Japan) Kohei Hirate	Toyota RV8K	+7.336	22
7	2	Petronas Team TOM'S	(Japan) Kazuki Nakajima	Toyota RV8K	+8.044	22
8	16	Team Mugen	(Japan) Naoki Yamamoto	Honda HR12E	+21.036	22
9	31	Nakajima Racing	(Japan) Daisuke Nakajima	Honda HR12E	+24.146	22
10	7	Team LeMans	(Japan) Kazuya Oshima	Toyota RV8K	+26.583	22
11	32	Nakajima Racing	(Japan) Takashi Kogure	Honda HR12E	+26.647	22
12	10	HP Real Racing	(Japan) Toshihiro Kaneishi	Honda HR12E	+32.861	22
13	15	Team Mugen	(Japan) Takuma Sato	Honda HR12E	+33.723	22
14	62	Tochigi Le Beausset Motorsports	(Japan) Koki Saga	Toyota RV8K	+38.424	22
15	18	SGC by KCMG	(Japan) Ryo Orime	Toyota RV8K	+54.551	22
16	3	Kondo Racing	(Japan) Hironobu Yasuda	Toyota RV8K	+1 Lap	21
DNF	41	Docomo Team Dandelion Racing	(Japan) Koudai Tsukakoshi	Honda HR12E	+6 Laps	16
DSQ^{1}	1	Petronas Team TOM'S	(Germany) André Lotterer	Toyota RV8K	+0.000	22

- ^1 – André Lotterer was disqualified post-race due to irregularities with the skid block on his car.

== GT300 Race 2 results ==
The second GT300 race was held on Sunday November 18.

Pos	No	Team	Driver	Chassis	Tyre	Time/Difference	Laps
1	66	A speed	(Japan) Hiroki Yoshimoto	Aston Martin V12 Vantage GT3	Y	37:17.346	22
2	2	Evangelion-01 Cars Tokai Dream28	(Japan) Hiroki Kato	Mooncraft Shiden	Y	+1.273	22
3	88	MonePa JLOC	(Japan) Manabu Orido	Lamborghini Gallardo GT3	Y	+17.060	22
4	52	Green Tec & Leon with Shift	(Japan) Hironori Takeuchi	Mercedes-Benz SLS AMG GT3	Y	+21.594	22
5	31	Hasepro apr	(Japan) Morio Nitta	Toyota Prius	Y	+22.368	22
6	11	Gainer	(Japan) Tetsuya Tanaka	Audi R8 LMS ultra	D	+23.225	22
7	16	Team Mugen	(Japan) Hideki Mutoh	Honda CR-Z	B	+23.377	22
8	87	JLOC	(Japan) Yuya Sakamoto	Lamborghini Gallardo GT3	Y	+25.746	22
9	43	Autobacs Racing Team Aguri	(Japan) Shinichi Takagi	ASL Garaiya	B	+32.731	22
10	30	Iwasaki Moda apr	(Japan) Yuki Iwasaki	Audi R8 LMS ultra	Y	+39.167	22
11	21	ZENT Hitotsuyama Racing	(Japan) Akihiro Tsuzuki	Audi R8 LMS	Y	+42.593	22
12	4	GSR Project Mirai	(Japan) Taku Bamba	BMW Z4 GT3	Y	+51.816	22
13	22	R'Qs Motorsports	(Japan) Hisashi Wada	Vemac RD350R	Y	+1:22.068	22
14	33	Hankook KTR	(Japan) Masami Kageyama	Porsche 911 GT3-R	HK	+1:22.701	22
15	48	NEON Dijon Racing	(Japan) Hiroshi Takamori	Callaway Corvette Z06.R GT3	Y	+1:38.601	22
16	61	R&D Sport	(Japan) Tetsuya Yamano	Subaru BRZ	Y	+1:40.844	22
17	86	Verity BOMEX JLOC	(Japan) Hideshi Matsuda	Lamborghini Gallardo RG-3	Y	+1 Lap	21
18	911	Team Taisan ENDLESS	(Japan) Kyosuke Mineo	Porsche 911 GT3-R	Y	+2 Laps	20
19	3	S-Road NDDP	(Japan) Yuhi Sekiguchi	Nissan GT-R GT3	Y	+2 Laps	20
20	0	GSR Hatsune Miku	(Japan) Nobuteru Taniguchi	BMW Z4 GT3	Y	+4 Laps	18
DNF	360	RunUp Tomei Sports	(Japan) Atsushi Tanaka	Callaway Corvette Z06.R GT3	Y	+15 Laps	7
DNF	14	Team SGC	(Japan) Naoya Yamano	Lexus IS350	Y	+15 Laps	7
DNF	77	investors Hitotsuyama Racing	(Japan) Kenji Kobayashi	Audi R8 LMS	Y	+21 Laps	1
DNF	5	Team Mach	(Japan) Tetsuji Tamanaka	Ferrari 458 Italia GT3	Y	+22 Laps	0

== GT500 Race 2 results ==
The second GT500 race was held on Sunday November 18.

Pos	No	Team	Driver	Chassis	Tyre	Time/Difference	Laps
1	38	Lexus Team ZENT Cerumo	(Japan) Yuji Tachikawa	Lexus SC430	B	34:51.361	22
2	36	Lexus Team Petronas TOM'S	(Japan) Kazuki Nakajima	Lexus SC430	B	+2.632	22
3	100	Raybrig Team Kunimitsu	(Japan) Takuya Izawa	Honda HSV-010 GT	B	+3.319	22
4	23	Motul Autech NISMO	(Japan) Satoshi Motoyama	Nissan GT-R	B	+12.563	22
5	24	D'Station ADVAN Kondo Racing	(Sweden) Björn Wirdheim	Nissan GT-R	Y	+17.439	22
6	6	Lexus Team ENEOS LeMans	(Japan) Daisuke Ito	Lexus SC430	B	+20.093	22
7	18	Weider Honda Racing	(Japan) Takashi Kogure	Honda HSV-010 GT	B	+22.192	22
8	39	Lexus Team DENSO SARD	(Japan) Juichi Wakisaka	Lexus SC430	MI	+26.676	22
9	8	Autobacs Racing Team Aguri	(Republic of Ireland) Ralph Firman	Honda HSV-010 GT	B	+29.299	22
10	35	Lexus Team KeePer Kraft	(Italy) Andrea Caldarelli	Lexus SC430	B	+30.723	22
11	12	Calsonic Team Impul	(Japan) Tsugio Matsuda	Nissan GT-R	B	+33.505	22
12	32	EPSON Nakajima Racing	(Japan) Ryo Michigami	Honda HSV-010 GT	D	+43.229	22
13	19	Lexus Team WedsSport Bandoh	(United Kingdom) Marino Franchitti	Lexus SC430	Y	+52.224	22
14	1	S-Road REITO MOLA	(Japan) Masataka Yanagida	Nissan GT-R	MI	+55.484	22
15	17	Keihin Real Racing	(Japan) Toshihiro Kaneishi	Honda HSV-010 GT	B	+1 Lap	21
