= 2013 42nd International Pokka Sapporo 1000km =

Sports car endurance race

2013 1000 km Suzuka

Seasons
- ← 2012 2014 →

Layout of the Suzuka International Racing Course

The 2013 42nd International Pokka Sapporo 1000 km was the fifth round of the 2013 Super GT season and the 42nd running of the 1000 km Suzuka event. It took place on August 18, 2013, at the Suzuka Circuit in Suzuka City, Japan.

== Background ==
Team Kunimitsu drivers Takuya Izawa and Takashi Kogure led the GT500 championship standings by one point over Lexus Team DENSO SARD's Juichi Wakisaka and Hiroaki Ishiura, while Team Mugen led the GT300 championship over Autobacs Racing Team Aguri in the second Honda CR-Z.

Following the SUGO race, the Japan Automobile Federation adjusted the Balance of Performance for Suzuka. The fuel tanks on the FIA GT3 cars were increased in capacity from a maximum of 100L to 110L. The minimum ground clearance for the JAF-GT cars was increased from 45mm to 53mm and a fuel flow restrictor was added to the fuel rigs for JAF-GT teams.

Team Mach returned to the championship at Suzuka, however they had swapped their Ferrari 458 Italia GT3 they started the season with, replacing it with a Nissan GT-R GT3. Tomei Sports Nissan GT-R GT3 was not entered for the race, nor was the Dijon Racing Callaway Corvette Z06.R GT3 which had competed in two of the four rounds in the season.

With Suzuka being the longest race on the championship calendar, bonus points would be awarded for all 10 points scoring positions. Instead of 20 points being awarded for the win, 25 points were awarded to the winner of the race. With the race also being the longest on the calendar, 15 of the 23 GT300 teams elected to run a third driver in their car. Gran Turismo Academy winner Lucas Ordóñez was entered in the race with NDDP Racing while former World Touring Car Championship and American Le Mans Series driver Jörg Müller was entered as a third driver for the GSR Hatsune Miku team. As in the 2012 race, 2013 All-Japan Formula Three champion Yuichi Nakayama was the third driver for apr, while Carlo van Dam returned to Super GT with the Cars Tokai Dream28 McLaren.

== Report ==
=== Qualifying ===
Qualifying was held on August 17, 2013, with the first of the sessions for the GT300 cars. Tetsuya Yamano was the fastest GT300 driver in the first session, breaking the track record with a 2:01.481, a record set by Yamano's teammate Kota Sasaki in the practice session earlier that day. The teams ranked 1st, 3rd, 5th and 6th in the GT300 championship prior to Suzuka weren't fast enough to qualify for the second session. The #87 JLOC Lamborghini Gallardo GT3 with Hiroki Yoshimoto driving had technical trouble and only ran one lap and was off the pace. In the first GT500 class session Frédéric Makowiecki set the fastest laptime in the first session, who set the fastest time on his last lap of the session, beating the #6 Lexus Team LeMans ENEOS being driven by Yuji Kunimoto.

In the second GT300 qualifying session for the thirteen fastest cars in the first qualifying session, Kota Sasaki wasn't able to beat his teammate's Q1 time but was still able to get their fourth pole position of the 2013 season with a 2:01.693, 0.782 seconds faster than Daiki Sasaki in the #3 NDDP Racing Nissan GT-R GT3. The #50 Arnage Racing Aston Martin V12 Vantage GT3 that won the 2012 race and finished second in the GT300 championship qualified third fastest with Hideto Yasuoka driving. In the final session, for the eight fastest GT500 cars, Ronnie Quintarelli in the #23 NISMO Nissan GT-R did a 1:52.157 early on in the session, which was fast enough for pole position. The #18 Weider Dome Racing Honda HSV-010 GT that was fastest in Q1 with Makowiecki driving was second fastest in Q2 with Naoki Yamamoto driving.

=== Race ===
The race was held on August 18, 2013. The race started at 12:35pm and all cars racing made clean starts, with Quintarelli and Sasaki leading the race from their respective pole positions. Kazuki Nakajima managed to overtake Yamamoto for 2nd place on the opening lap, but as the leaders caught up to the slower GT300 cars Yamamoto re-passed Nakajima for 2nd. On lap 20 after GT300 cars slowed Quintarelli and Yamamoto managed to overtake him for the overall race lead. The #61 Subaru BRZ led from pole position and was able to consistently lap faster than the field, after one-third race distance Sasaki and Takuto Iguchi who drove the 2nd stint in the car was 90 seconds ahead of the #4 GSR Hatsune Miku BMW. However, as the overall leaders were on their 66th lap, the #86 JLOC Lamborghini Gallardo GT3 with Shinya Hosokawa driving blew a tyre and from the resulting damage there was a small fire on the Lamborghini. The safety car was deployed and many teams elected to make their second of four compulsory pitstops.

The #1 MOLA GT-R, #24 Kondo Racing GT-R and the #38 Cerumo SC430 along with many GT300 competitors (the #2 McLaren, the #3 GT-R, the #5 GT-R, the #9 Porsche, and the #87 Lamborghini) were all judged to be in violation of the safety car regulations and all were given 90 second stop-go penalties. Following the #1 car serving its penalty and due to the timing of the safety car Ronnie Quintarelli in the #23 NISMO Nissan GT-R was back into the lead of the GT500 class while the #61 R&D Sport Subaru BRZ was still leading GT300, now with Tetsuya Yamano driving. Masataka Yanagida had a close call after colliding with a slower GT300 car on his outlap in the #23 GT-R, but the incident allowed Frédéric Makowiecki to close in. Makowiecki ended up passing Yanagida for the lead on lap 116. Further behind in the GT500 class Seiji Ara had brought the #19 SC430 from 12th on the grid to 4th place and in a battle with Tsugio Matsuda for 3rd place. However Ara ran wide after trying to pass a GT300 car and dropped to 6th place, behind both the TOM's cars.

The #61 R&D Sport Subaru BRZ was again leading GT300 by a large margin but with around 30 laps left in the race the rear diffuser on the car was damaged from an earlier incident and had now caused aerodynamic issues as well as damage to the right-rear tyre from bodywork rubbing on it. Sasaki slowed his pace down and Nobuteru Taniguchi in 2nd and Naoya Gamou in 3rd both improved their laptimes to try to catch Sasaki before the end of the race. Sasaki ended up pitting the car and the team worked on the car fast enough for Sasaki to rejoin just behind Taniguchi who inherited the lead. With fresher rear tyres and more fuel on board Sasaki was able to push again and with 14 laps left overtook Taniguchi for the race lead, and held him off to win the GT300 class, the first win for the Subaru BRZ in Super GT.

In the GT500 class, both the leading #18 HSV-010 and the #23 GT-R made their last pitstop at the end of lap 139. Yamamoto took over the wheel of the #18 and managed to stay in front of Quintarelli in the pitstops, and over the course of the final stint was able to hold him off for the GT500 race win, and the first time both Yamamoto and Makowiecki won in Super GT. the #36 Lexus Team Petronas TOM'S entry of Kazuki Nakajima and James Rossiter finished in 3rd place after João Paulo de Oliveira ran off course with 3 laps to go and dropped the #12 Calsonic Team Impul Nissan GT-R to 4th.

The #4 GSR Hatsune Miku BMW that finished 2nd in the GT300 class was later disqualified after it failed post-race inspections. The #52 OKINAWA-IMP RACING with SHIFT Mercedes-Benz SLS AMG GT3 inherited 2nd place and the #62 Leon Racing Mercedes-Benz SLS AMG GT3 was given 3rd place. 32 of the 38 starters managed to complete enough laps to be classified in the final race result.

== Results ==
=== Qualifying ===
Pos	No	Team	Drivers	Qualifying 1	Qualifying 2	Tyre
GT500
1	23	Motul Autech NISMO	(Italy) Ronnie Quintarelli		1:52.157	M
1	23	Motul Autech NISMO	(Japan) Masataka Yanagida	1:53.101		M
2	18	Weider Dome Racing	(France) Frédéric Makowiecki	1:52.694		M
2	18	Weider Dome Racing	(Japan) Naoki Yamamoto		1:52.359	M
3	36	Lexus Team Petronas TOM'S	(Japan) Kazuki Nakajima		1:52.440	B
3	36	Lexus Team Petronas TOM'S	(United Kingdom) James Rossiter	1:53.231		B
4	38	Lexus Team Zent Cerumo	(Japan) Kohei Hirate	1:53.058		B
4	38	Lexus Team Zent Cerumo	(Japan) Yuji Tachikawa		1:52.559	B
5	6	Lexus Team LeMans ENEOS	(Japan) Yuji Kunimoto	1:53.040		B
5	6	Lexus Team LeMans ENEOS	(Japan) Kazuya Oshima		1:52.601	B
6	17	Keihin Real Racing	(Japan) Toshihiro Kaneishi	1:53.566		B
6	17	Keihin Real Racing	(Japan) Koudai Tsukakoshi		1:52.993	B
7	37	Lexus Team KeePer TOM'S	(Italy) Andrea Caldarelli		1:53.216	B
7	37	Lexus Team KeePer TOM'S	(Japan) Daisuke Ito	1:53.399		B
8	100	Raybrig Team Kunimitsu	(Japan) Takuya Izawa		1:53.253	B
8	100	Raybrig Team Kunimitsu	(Japan) Takashi Kogure	1:53.402		B
9	1	S-Road REITO MOLA	(Japan) Satoshi Motoyama			M
9	1	S-Road REITO MOLA	(Japan) Yuhi Sekiguchi	1:53.721		M
10	39	Lexus Team DENSO SARD	(Japan) Hiroaki Ishiura			B
10	39	Lexus Team DENSO SARD	(Japan) Juichi Wakisaka	1:53.786		B
11	12	Calsonic Team Impul	(Brazil) João Paulo de Oliveira	1:54.105		B
11	12	Calsonic Team Impul	(Japan) Tsugio Matsuda			B
12	19	Lexus Team WedsSport Bandoh	(Japan) Seiji Ara			Y
12	19	Lexus Team WedsSport Bandoh	(Portugal) Andre Couto	1:54.250		Y
13	24	D'Station ADVAN Kondo Racing	(Germany) Michael Krumm			Y
13	24	D'Station ADVAN Kondo Racing	(Japan) Hironobu Yasuda	1:54.298		Y
14	32	Epson Nakajima Racing	(Japan) Ryo Michigami			D
14	32	Epson Nakajima Racing	(Japan) Daisuke Nakajima	1:54.553		D
15	8	Autobacs Racing Team Aguri	(Republic of Ireland) Ralph Firman	1:55.369		B
15	8	Autobacs Racing Team Aguri	(Japan) Kosuke Matsuura			B
GT300
1	61	R&D Sport	(Japan) Kota Sasaki		2'01.693	M
1	61	R&D Sport	(Japan) Tetsuya Yamano	2'01.481		M
1	61	R&D Sport	(Japan) Takuto Iguchi			M
2	3	NDDP Racing	(Japan) Kazuki Hoshino	2'02.871		Y
2	3	NDDP Racing	(Japan) Daiki Sasaki		2'02.475	Y
2	3	NDDP Racing	(Spain) Lucas Ordóñez			Y
3	50	Arnage Racing	(Japan) Masaki Kano			Y
3	50	Arnage Racing	(Japan) Hideto Yasuoka		2'02.680	Y
3	50	Arnage Racing	(Japan) Ryohei Sakaguchi	2'03.332		Y
4	33	Hankook KTR	(Japan) Tomonobu Fujii		2'03.109	H
4	33	Hankook KTR	(Japan) Masami Kageyama	2'03.483		H
5	62	Leon Racing	(Japan) Haruki Kurosawa		2'03.267	Y
5	62	Leon Racing	(Japan) Tsubasa Kurosawa	2'03.890		Y
5	62	Leon Racing	(Japan) Akihiko Nakaya			Y
6	22	R'Qs MotorSports	(Japan) Masaki Jyonai		2'03.495	Y
6	22	R'Qs MotorSports	(Japan) Hisashi Wada	2'03.911		Y
7	52	OKINAWA-IMP RACING with SHIFT	(Japan) Hironori Takeuchi		2'03.569	Y
7	52	OKINAWA-IMP RACING with SHIFT	(Japan) Takeshi Tsuchiya	2'03.121		Y
7	52	OKINAWA-IMP RACING with SHIFT	(Japan) Naoya Gamou			Y
8	55	Autobacs Racing Team Aguri	(Japan) Takashi Kobayashi	2'03.229		B
8	55	Autobacs Racing Team Aguri	(Japan) Shinichi Takagi		2'03.573	B
8	55	Autobacs Racing Team Aguri	(Japan) Tomoki Nojiri			B
9	86	JLOC	(Japan) Shinya Hosokawa		2'03.920	Y
9	86	JLOC	(Japan) Koji Yamanishi	2'03.630		Y
9	86	JLOC	(Japan) Yuya Sakamoto			Y
10	9	Pacific Direction Racing	(Japan) Shogo Mitsuyama	2'03.913		Y
10	9	Pacific Direction Racing	(Japan) You Yokomaku			Y
10	9	Pacific Direction Racing	(Japan) Yuya Sakamoto		2'04.013	Y
11	0	Team Taisan Ken Endless	(Japan) Kyosuke Mineo		2'04.071	Y
11	0	Team Taisan Ken Endless	(Japan) Naoki Yokomizo	2'03.605		Y
12	21	ZENT Audi R8 LMS ultra	(United Kingdom) Richard Lyons	2'03.797		H
12	21	ZENT Audi R8 LMS ultra	(Japan) Akihiro Tsuzuki		2'04.978	H
13	48	Dijon Racing	(Japan) Katsumasa Chiyo	2'03.807		Y
13	48	Dijon Racing	(Japan) Hiroshi Takamori		2'06.783	Y
13	48	Dijon Racing	(Japan) Masaki Tanaka			Y
14	16	Team Mugen	(Japan) Hideki Mutoh			B
14	16	Team Mugen	(Japan) Yuhki Nakayama	2'03.975		B
15	10	Gainer	(Japan) Tetsuya Tanaka	2'04.171		D
15	10	Gainer	(Japan) Masayuki Ueda			D
15	10	Gainer	(Japan) Masataka Kawaguchi			D
16	11	Gainer	(Japan) Katsuyuki Hiranaka			D
16	11	Gainer	(Sweden) Björn Wirdheim	2'04.173		D
17	4	GSR Hatsune Miku	(Japan) Tatsuya Kataoka			Y
17	4	GSR Hatsune Miku	(Japan) Nobuteru Taniguchi	2'04.193		Y
17	4	GSR Hatsune Miku	(Japan) Jörg Müller			Y
18	30	apr	(Japan) Yuki Iwasaki	2'04.216		Y
18	30	apr	(United States) Igor Sushko			Y
18	30	apr	(Japan) Kenji Kobayashi			Y
19	31	apr	(Japan) Morio Nitta	2'04.268		Y
19	31	apr	(Japan) Koki Saga			Y
19	31	apr	(Japan) Yuichi Nakayama			Y
20	2	Cars Tokai Dream28	(Japan) Hiroki Katoh	2'04.626		Y
20	2	Cars Tokai Dream28	(Japan) Kazuho Takahashi			Y
20	2	Cars Tokai Dream28	(Netherlands) Carlo Van Dam			Y
21	88	JLOC	(Japan) Takayuki Aoki	2'05.448		Y
21	88	JLOC	(Japan) Manabu Orido			Y
22	5	Team Mach	(Japan) Tetsuji Tamanaka	2'06.623		Y
22	5	Team Mach	(Japan) Junichiro Yamashita			Y
22	5	Team Mach	(Japan) Naofumi Omoto			Y
23	87	JLOC	(Japan) Hideki Yamauchi			Y
23	87	JLOC	(Japan) Hiroki Yoshimoto	2'22.033		Y

=== Race ===
Race result is as follows.

Pos	No	Team	Drivers	Chassis	Tyre	Time/Difference	Laps
GT500
1	18	Weider Dome Racing	(France) Frédéric Makowiecki (Japan) Naoki Yamamoto	Honda HSV-010 GT	M	5:55:04.565	173
2	23	Motul Autech NISMO	(Italy) Ronnie Quintarelli (Japan) Masataka Yanagida	Nissan GT-R	M	+14.801	173
3	36	Lexus Team Petronas TOM'S	(Japan) Kazuki Nakajima (United Kingdom) James Rossiter	Lexus SC430	B	+51.556	173
4	12	Calsonic Team Impul	(Brazil) João Paulo de Oliveira (Japan) Tsugio Matsuda	Nissan GT-R	B	+55.064	173
5	37	Lexus Team KeePer TOM'S	(Italy) Andrea Caldarelli (Japan) Daisuke Ito	Lexus SC430	B	+59.906	173
6	19	Lexus Team WedsSport Bandoh	(Japan) Seiji Ara (Portugal) Andre Couto	Lexus SC430	Y	+1:21.913	173
7	17	Keihin Real Racing	(Japan) Toshihiro Kaneishi (Japan) Koudai Tsukakoshi	Honda HSV-010 GT	B	+1:38.252	173
8	1	S-Road REITO MOLA	(Japan) Satoshi Motoyama (Japan) Yuhi Sekiguchi	Nissan GT-R	M	+1:54.429	173
9	39	Lexus Team DENSO SARD	(Japan) Hiroaki Ishiura (Japan) Juichi Wakisaka	Lexus SC430	B	+1 Lap	172
10	100	Raybrig Team Kunimitsu	(Japan) Takuya Izawa (Japan) Takashi Kogure	Honda HSV-010 GT	B	+1 Lap	172
11	38	Lexus Team Zent Cerumo	(Japan) Kohei Hirate (Japan) Yuji Tachikawa	Lexus SC430	B	+2 Laps	171
12	8	Autobacs Racing Team Aguri	(Republic of Ireland) Ralph Firman (Japan) Kosuke Matsuura	Honda HSV-010 GT	B	+2 Laps	171
13	32	Epson Nakajima Racing	(Japan) Ryo Michigami (Japan) Daisuke Nakajima	Honda HSV-010 GT	D	+3 Laps	170
Ret	24	D'Station ADVAN Kondo Racing	(Germany) Michael Krumm (Japan) Hironobu Yasuda	Nissan GT-R	Y	+67 Laps	106
Ret	6	Lexus Team LeMans ENEOS	(Japan) Yuji Kunimoto (Japan) Kazuya Oshima	Lexus SC430	B	+69 Laps	104
GT300
1	61	R&D Sport	(Japan) Kota Sasaki (Japan) Tetsuya Yamano (Japan) Takuto Iguchi	Subaru BRZ	M	5:56:53.547	161
2	52	OKINAWA-IMP RACING with SHIFT	(Japan) Hironori Takeuchi (Japan) Takeshi Tsuchiya (Japan) Naoya Gamou	Mercedes-Benz SLS AMG GT3	Y	+1 Lap	160
3	62	Leon Racing	(Japan) Haruki Kurosawa (Japan) Tsubasa Kurosawa (Japan) Akihiko Nakaya	Mercedes-Benz SLS AMG GT3	Y	+1 Lap	160
4	88	JLOC	(Japan) Takayuki Aoki (Japan) Manabu Orido	Lamborghini Gallardo GT3	Y	+1 Lap	160
5	16	Team Mugen	(Japan) Hideki Mutoh (Japan) Yuhki Nakayama	Honda CR-Z	B	+1 Lap	160
6	11	Gainer	(Japan) Katsuyuki Hiranaka (Sweden) Björn Wirdheim	Mercedes-Benz SLS AMG GT3	D	+2 Laps	159
7	0	Team Taisan Ken Endless	(Japan) Kyosuke Mineo (Japan) Naoki Yokomizo	Porsche 997 GT3	Y	+2 Laps	159
8	50	Arnage Racing	(Japan) Masaki Kano (Japan) Hideto Yasuoka (Japan) Ryohei Sakaguchi	Aston Martin V12 Vantage GT3	Y	+3 Laps	158
9	3	NDDP Racing	(Japan) Kazuki Hoshino (Japan) Daiki Sasaki (Spain) Lucas Ordóñez	Nissan GT-R GT3	Y	+3 Laps	158
10	33	Hankook KTR	(Japan) Tomonobu Fujii (Japan) Masami Kageyama	Porsche 911 GT3-R	H	+4 Laps	157
11	21	Hitotsuyama Racing	(United Kingdom) Richard Lyons (Japan) Akihiro Tsuzuki	Audi R8 LMS ultra	H	+4 Laps	157
12	22	R'Qs MotorSports	(Japan) Masaki Jyonai (Japan) Hisashi Wada	Mercedes-Benz SLS AMG GT3	Y	+4 Laps	157
13	10	Gainer	(Japan) Tetsuya Tanaka (Japan) Masayuki Ueda (Japan) Masataka Kawaguchi	Mercedes-Benz SLS AMG GT3	D	+5 Laps	156
14	9	Pacific Direction Racing	(Japan) Shogo Mitsuyama (Japan) You Yokomaku (Japan) Yuya Sakamoto	Porsche 911 GT3-R	Y	+10 Laps	151
15	31	apr	(Japan) Morio Nitta (Japan) Koki Saga (Japan) Yuichi Nakayama	Toyota Prius	Y	+20 Laps	141
16	48	Dijon Racing	(Japan) Katsumasa Chiyo (Japan) Hiroshi Takamori (Japan) Masaki Tanaka	Nissan GT-R GT3	Y	+27 Laps	134
17	30	apr	(Japan) Yuki Iwasaki (United States) Igor Sushko (Japan) Kenji Kobayashi	Nissan GT-R GT3	Y	+35 Laps	126
18	2	Cars Tokai Dream28	(Japan) Hiroki Katoh (Japan) Kazuho Takahashi (Netherlands) Carlo van Dam	McLaren MP4-12C GT3	Y	+38 Laps	123
19	5	Team Mach	(Japan) Naofumi Omoto (Japan) Tetsuji Tamanaka (Japan) Junichiro Yamashita	Nissan GT-R GT3	Y	+47 Laps	114
Ret	87	JLOC	(Japan) Hideki Yamauchi (Japan) Hiroki Yoshimoto	Lamborghini Gallardo GT3	Y	+56 Laps	105
Ret	86	JLOC	(Japan) Shinya Hosokawa (Japan) Koji Yamanishi (Japan) Yuya Sakamoto	Lamborghini Gallardo GT3	Y	+104 Laps	57
Ret	55	Autobacs Racing Team Aguri	(Japan) Takashi Kobayashi (Japan) Shinichi Takagi (Japan) Tomoki Nojiri	Honda CR-Z	B	+132 Laps	29
DSQ	4	GSR Hatsune Miku	(Japan) Tatsuya Kataoka (Japan) Nobuteru Taniguchi (Germany) Jörg Müller	BMW Z4 GT3	Y	+14.665	161

- GT500 Fastest Lap – Frédéric Makowiecki, #18 Weider Dome Racing Honda HSV-010 GT – 1:54.886
- GT300 Fastest Lap – Kota Sasaki, #61 R&D Sport Subaru BRZ – 2:02.606

== Point rankings after the event ==
GT500 Driver Point rankings

Rank	Driver	Points
1	(Italy) Ronnie Quintarelli (Japan) Masataka Yanagida	42
2	(Brazil) João Paulo de Oliveira (Japan) Tsugio Matsuda	41
3	(France) Frédéric Makowiecki (Japan) Naoki Yamamoto	40
4	(Japan) Takuya Izawa (Japan) Takashi Kogure	37
5	(Japan) Hiroaki Ishiura (Japan) Juichi Wakisaka	37

GT300 Driver Point rankings

Rank	Driver	Points
1	(Japan) Hideki Mutoh (Japan) Yuhki Nakayama	57
2	(Japan) Kota Sasaki (Japan) Tetsuya Yamano	44
3	(Japan) Katsuyuki Hiranaka (Sweden) Björn Wirdheim	42
4	(Japan) Hironori Takeuchi (Japan) Takeshi Tsuchiya	42
5	(Japan) Takashi Kobayashi (Japan) Shinichi Takagi	40

- Note: Only the top five positions are included for both GT500 and GT300 classes.

Super GT
Previous race: SUGO GT 300km	2013 season	Next race: Fuji GT 300km
