= 2014 Super Formula Championship =

Seasons
- ← 2013 2015 →

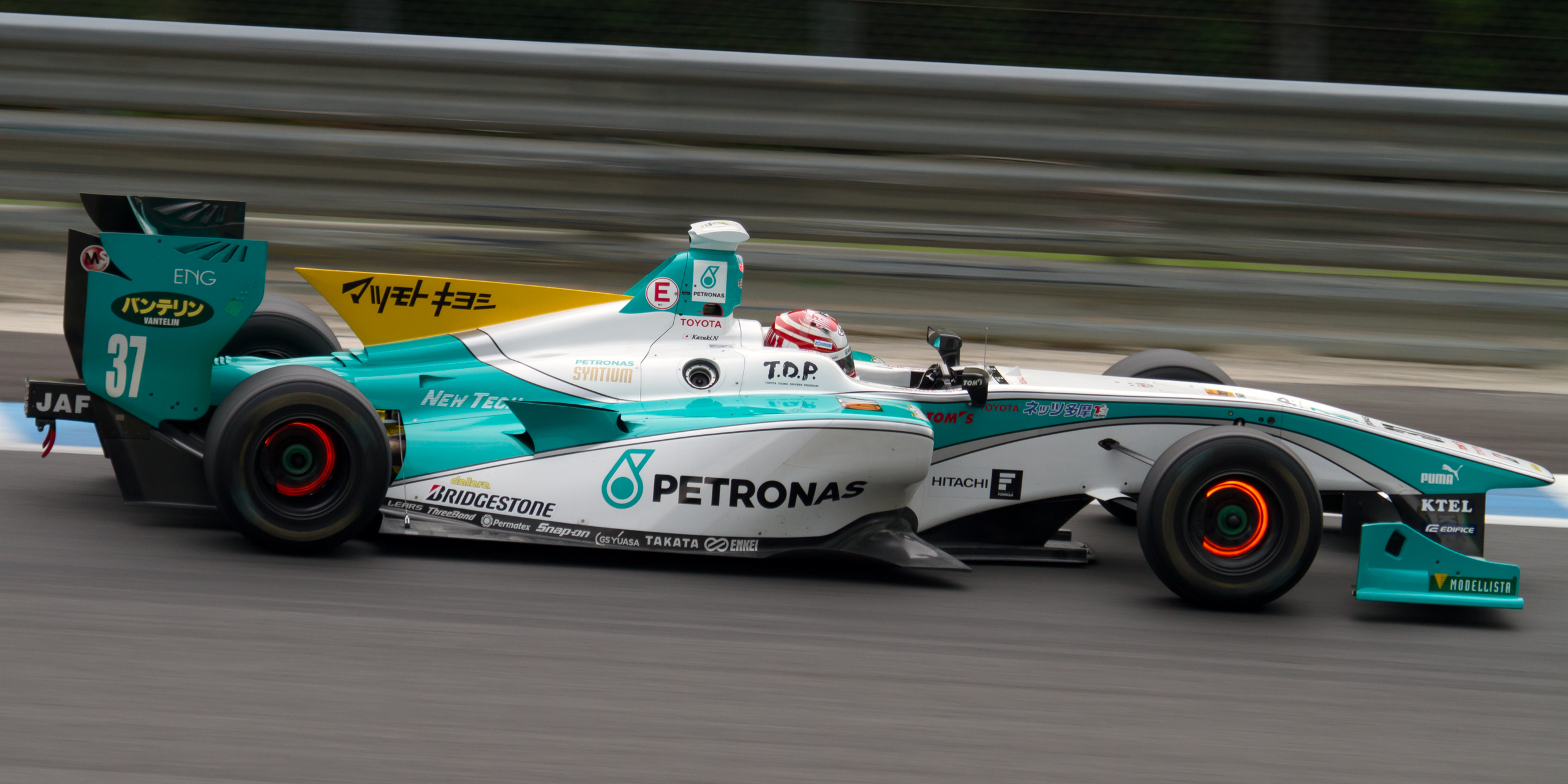
2014 champion, Kazuki Nakajima

The 2014 Japanese Championship Super Formula season was the forty-second season of the premier series in Japanese open-wheel motor racing, and the second under the name of Super Formula. 2014 was also the first season using the new chassis, the Dallara SF14, which replaced the Swift SF09 used in previous seasons. The season began on 13 April and ended on 9 November after seven rounds.

2012 champion Kazuki Nakajima claimed his second title in three seasons, after a consistent campaign, in which he scored points in each of the nine races to be held. Nakajima won races at Fuji and Suzuka as the TOM'S driver won the championship by 6.5 points, ahead of Impul's João Paulo de Oliveira. De Oliveira was the season's most frequent winner, with three victories, winning at Fuji, Suzuka and Motegi. Third place in the championship went to Nakajima's team-mate, André Lotterer. Lotterer won races at Fuji and Autopolis, but missed out on a chance to compete for the championship, after missing the Motegi round to make his Formula One début with Caterham at the Belgian Grand Prix.

The only other drivers to win races during the season were Team LeMans' Loïc Duval, who won the season-opening round at Suzuka. Like Lotterer, he missed a race – at Fuji – as he was still recovering from his accident suffered during practice for the 24 Hours of Le Mans. Tomoki Nojiri was the season's other winner, winning at Sportsland SUGO for Team Dandelion Racing. The performances of Nakajima, Lotterer and Andrea Caldarelli (replacing Lotterer at Motegi) were enough for TOM'S to win the teams' championship, finishing 33.5 points clear of the next best team, Team LeMans.

== Teams and drivers ==
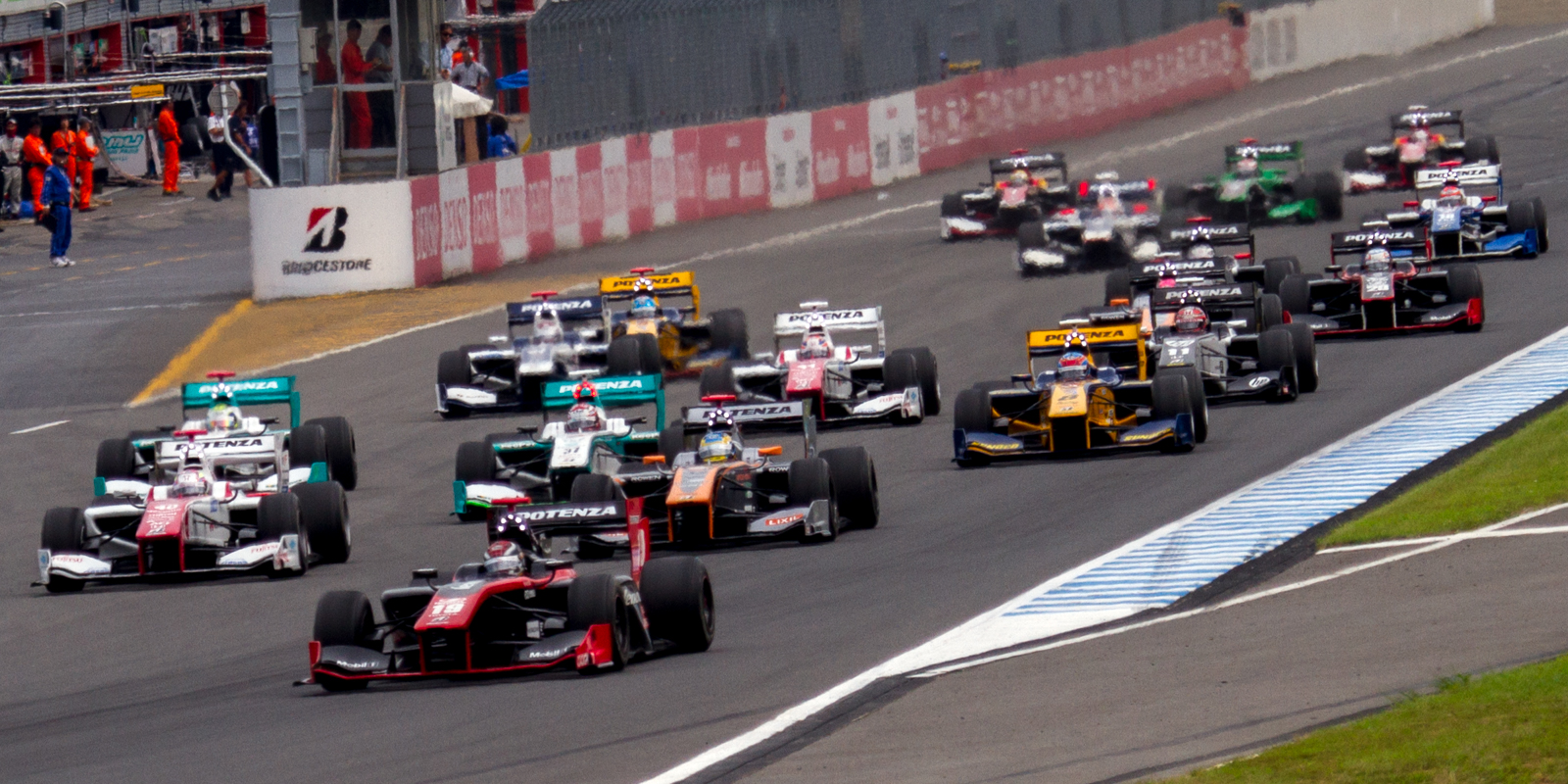
Race start at Twin Ring Motegi

Team	No.	Driver	Engine	Rounds
(Japan) Team Mugen	1	(Japan) Naoki Yamamoto	Honda HR-414E	All
(Japan) Team Mugen	2	(Japan) Yuhki Nakayama	Honda HR-414E	All
(Japan) Kondō Racing	3	(United Kingdom) James Rossiter	Toyota RI4A	All
(Japan) Kygnus Sunoco Team LeMans	7	(Japan) Ryō Hirakawa	Toyota RI4A	All
(Japan) Kygnus Sunoco Team LeMans	8	(France) Loïc Duval	Toyota RI4A	1–2, 4–7
(Japan) Kygnus Sunoco Team LeMans	8	(Italy) Andrea Caldarelli	Toyota RI4A	3
(Japan) HP Real Racing	10	(Japan) Koudai Tsukakoshi	Honda HR-414E	All
(Japan) HP Real Racing	11	(Italy) Vitantonio Liuzzi	Honda HR-414E	All
(Hong Kong) KCMG	18	(Japan) Yuichi Nakayama	Toyota RI4A	All
(Japan) Lenovo Team Impul	19	(Brazil) João Paulo de Oliveira	Toyota RI4A	All
(Japan) Lenovo Team Impul	20	(India) Narain Karthikeyan	Toyota RI4A	All
(Japan) Nakajima Racing	31	(Japan) Daisuke Nakajima	Honda HR-414E	All
(Japan) Nakajima Racing	32	(Japan) Takashi Kogure	Honda HR-414E	All
(Japan) Drago Corse	34	(Japan) Takuya Izawa	Honda HR-414E	6–7
(Japan) Petronas Team TOM'S	36	(Germany) André Lotterer	Toyota RI4A	1–3, 5–7
(Japan) Petronas Team TOM'S	36	(Italy) Andrea Caldarelli	Toyota RI4A	4
(Japan) Petronas Team TOM'S	37	(Japan) Kazuki Nakajima	Toyota RI4A	All
(Japan) P.mu/cerumo・INGING	38	(Japan) Hiroaki Ishiura	Toyota RI4A	All
(Japan) P.mu/cerumo・INGING	39	(Japan) Yuji Kunimoto	Toyota RI4A	All
(Japan) Docomo Team Dandelion Racing	40	(Japan) Tomoki Nojiri	Honda HR-414E	All
(Japan) Docomo Team Dandelion Racing	41	(Japan) Hideki Mutoh	Honda HR-414E	All
(Japan) Tochigi Le Beausset Motorsports	62	(Japan) Koki Saga	Toyota RI4A	All

== Race calendar and results ==
A provisional calendar for the 2014 season was released on 8 November 2013. All races were held in Japan.

Round		Circuit	Date	Pole position	Fastest lap	Winning driver	Winning team
1		Suzuka Circuit	13 April	(Germany) André Lotterer	(Brazil) João Paulo de Oliveira	(France) Loïc Duval	Kygnus Sunoco Team LeMans
2	R1	Fuji Speedway	18 May	(Brazil) João Paulo de Oliveira	(Brazil) João Paulo de Oliveira	(Brazil) João Paulo de Oliveira	Lenovo Team Impul
2	R2	Fuji Speedway	18 May	(Germany) André Lotterer	(Brazil) João Paulo de Oliveira	(Germany) André Lotterer	Petronas Team TOM'S
3		Fuji Speedway	13 July	(Italy) Andrea Caldarelli	(Brazil) João Paulo de Oliveira	(Japan) Kazuki Nakajima	Petronas Team TOM'S
4		Twin Ring Motegi	24 August	(Brazil) João Paulo de Oliveira	(Brazil) João Paulo de Oliveira	(Brazil) João Paulo de Oliveira	Lenovo Team Impul
5		Autopolis	14 September	(Japan) Naoki Yamamoto	(Germany) André Lotterer	(Germany) André Lotterer	Petronas Team TOM'S
6		Sportsland SUGO	28 September	(Japan) Naoki Yamamoto	(Japan) Yuichi Nakayama	(Japan) Tomoki Nojiri	Docomo Team Dandelion Racing
7	R1	Suzuka Circuit	9 November	(Germany) André Lotterer	(Brazil) João Paulo de Oliveira	(Brazil) João Paulo de Oliveira	Lenovo Team Impul
7	R2	Suzuka Circuit	9 November	(Japan) Kazuki Nakajima	(France) Loïc Duval	(Japan) Kazuki Nakajima	Petronas Team TOM'S

== Championship standings ==
=== Drivers' Championship ===
Scoring system

Round	1st	2nd	3rd	4th	5th	6th	7th	8th	Pole
1, 3–6	10	8	6	5	4	3	2	1	1
2	5	4	3	2.5	2	1.5	1	0.5	1
7	8	4	3	2.5	2	1.5	1	0.5	1

Pos	Driver	SUZ	FUJ		FUJ	MOT	AUT	SUG	SUZ		Points
1	(Japan) Kazuki Nakajima	6	2	3	1	7	6	2	2	**1**	46
2	(Brazil) João Paulo de Oliveira	7	**1**	2	Ret	**1**	3	Ret	1	4	39.5
3	(Germany) André Lotterer	**5**	4	**1**	6		1	Ret	**3**	2	34.5
4	(France) Loïc Duval	1	3	4		4	15	3	11	3	29.5
5	(Japan) Hiroaki Ishiura	3	Ret	11	4	2	8	6	5	7	26
6	(United Kingdom) James Rossiter	2	6	17	8	8	5	4	6	10	22
7	(Japan) Yuji Kunimoto	13	5	7	3	13	2	9	4	Ret	19.5
8	(Japan) Ryō Hirakawa	4	Ret	8	2	10	13	8	16	5	16.5
9	(Japan) Naoki Yamamoto	11	Ret	5	5	15	**7**	**7**	7	6	14.5
10	(Japan) Tomoki Nojiri	9	Ret	15	12	9	9	1	12	9	10
11	(Japan) Koudai Tsukakoshi	14	DNS	9	Ret	6	4	Ret	8	13	8.5
12	(Italy) Andrea Caldarelli				**Ret**	3					7
13	(India) Narain Karthikeyan	Ret	7	6	7	Ret	17	11	10	8	5
14	(Japan) Daisuke Nakajima	Ret	9	14	9	16	12	5	9	15	4
15	(Japan) Hideki Mutoh	10	10	12	11	5	10	12	13	12	4
16	(Italy) Vitantonio Liuzzi	8	8	10	Ret	14	Ret	Ret	15	11	1.5
17	(Japan) Takashi Kogure	Ret	Ret	DNS	Ret	11	Ret	10	Ret	16	0
18	(Japan) Yuichi Nakayama	Ret	13	16	10	Ret	16	13	Ret	18	0
19	(Japan) Koki Saga	Ret	11	13	Ret	17	11	Ret	Ret	19	0
20	(Japan) Yuhki Nakayama	12	12	18	13	12	14	14	Ret	17	0
21	(Japan) Takuya Izawa							Ret	14	14	0
Pos	Driver	SUZ	FUJ		FUJ	MOT	AUT	SUG	SUZ		Points

Colour	Result
Gold	Winner
Silver	Second place
Bronze	Third place
Green	Points classification
Blue	Non-points classification
Blue	Non-classified finish (NC)
Purple	Retired, not classified (Ret)
Red	Did not qualify (DNQ)
Red	Did not pre-qualify (DNPQ)
Black	Disqualified (DSQ)
White	Did not start (DNS)
White	Withdrew (WD)
White	Race cancelled (C)
Blank	Did not practice (DNP)
Blank	Did not arrive (DNA)
Blank	Excluded (EX)

**Bold** – Pole
Italics – Fastest Lap

=== Teams' Championship ===
Pos	Team	No.	SUZ	FUJ		FUJ	MOT	AUT	SUG	SUZ		Points
1	Petronas Team TOM'S	36	**5**	4	**1**	6	3	1	Ret	**3**	2	79.5
1	Petronas Team TOM'S	37	6	2	3	1	7	6	2	2	**1**	79.5
2	Kygnus Sunoco Team LeMans	7	4	Ret	8	2	10	13	8	16	5	46
2	Kygnus Sunoco Team LeMans	8	1	3	4	**Ret**	4	15	3	11	3	46
3	P.mu/cerumo・INGING	38	3	Ret	11	4	2	8	6	5	7	45.5
3	P.mu/cerumo・INGING	39	13	5	7	3	13	2	9	4	Ret	45.5
4	Lenovo Team Impul	19	7	**1**	2	Ret	**1**	3	Ret	1	4	39.5
4	Lenovo Team Impul	20	Ret	7	6	7	Ret	17	11	10	8	39.5
5	Kondo Racing	3	2	6	17	8	8	5	4	6	10	22
6	Docomo Team Dandelion Racing	40	9	Ret	15	12	9	9	1	12	9	14
6	Docomo Team Dandelion Racing	41	10	10	12	11	5	10	12	13	12	14
7	Team Mugen	1	11	Ret	5	5	15	**7**	**7**	7	6	12.5
7	Team Mugen	2	12	12	18	13	12	14	14	Ret	17	12.5
8	HP Real Racing	10	14	DNS	9	Ret	6	4	Ret	8	13	10
8	HP Real Racing	11	8	8	10	Ret	14	Ret	Ret	15	11	10
9	Nakajima Racing	31	Ret	9	14	9	16	12	5	9	15	4
9	Nakajima Racing	32	Ret	Ret	DNS	Ret	11	Ret	10	Ret	16	4
	KCMG	18	Ret	13	16	10	Ret	16	13	Ret	18	0
	Tochigi Le Beausset Motorsports	62	Ret	11	13	Ret	17	11	Ret	Ret	19	0
	Drago Corse	34							Ret	14	14	0
Pos	Team	No.	SUZ	FUJ		FUJ	MOT	AUT	SUG	SUZ		Points

Colour	Result
Gold	Winner
Silver	Second place
Bronze	Third place
Green	Points classification
Blue	Non-points classification
Blue	Non-classified finish (NC)
Purple	Retired, not classified (Ret)
Red	Did not qualify (DNQ)
Red	Did not pre-qualify (DNPQ)
Black	Disqualified (DSQ)
White	Did not start (DNS)
White	Withdrew (WD)
White	Race cancelled (C)
Blank	Did not practice (DNP)
Blank	Did not arrive (DNA)
Blank	Excluded (EX)

**Bold** – Pole
Italics – Fastest Lap
