= 2013 Super Formula Championship =

Seasons
- ← 2012 2014 →

The 2013 Japanese Championship Super Formula season was the forty-first season of premier Japanese open-wheel motor racing, and the first under the new name of Super Formula. The series was contested over six rounds and a non-championship final round at Fuji Speedway as part of the JAF Grand Prix. 2013 was also the last season using the original chassis (SF13, known as FN09 in previous seasons) by Swift Engineering as for 2014 Dallara would supply a new chassis, the SF14, to the series.

Naoki Yamamoto won his first drivers' championship with Team Mugen, while Petronas Team TOM's won the teams' championship. Yamamoto and André Lotterer finished the year with the same number of points. At the time, Super Formula had an unconventional championship tiebreaker method where the driver that scored the most points in the final round of the season would be declared the champion. Lotterer had more wins, but had to miss the final round due to his commitments in the FIA World Endurance Championship, while Yamamoto finished first and third in the double-header finale at Suzuka to equal Lotterer's point total and win the championship.

In the same season, Loïc Duval won the Sportsland Sugo round, defeating Lotterer by 0.041 seconds. It was the closest margin of victory in series history.

== Teams and drivers ==
Team	No.	Driver	Engine	Rounds
(Japan) Petronas Team TOM'S	1	(Japan) Kazuki Nakajima	Toyota RV8K	All
(Japan) Petronas Team TOM'S	2	(United Kingdom) James Rossiter	Toyota RV8K	1, 6
(Japan) Petronas Team TOM'S	2	(Germany) André Lotterer	Toyota RV8K	2–5, NC
(Japan) Kondō Racing	3	(Japan) Hironobu Yasuda	Toyota RV8K	All
(Japan) Kygnus Sunoco Team LeMans	7	(Japan) Ryō Hirakawa	Toyota RV8K	All
(Japan) Kygnus Sunoco Team LeMans	8	(Italy) Andrea Caldarelli	Toyota RV8K	1, 6
(Japan) Kygnus Sunoco Team LeMans	8	(France) Loïc Duval	Toyota RV8K	2–5, NC
(Japan) HP Real Racing	10	(Japan) Koudai Tsukakoshi	Honda HR12E	All
(Japan) HP Real Racing	11	(Japan) Yuhki Nakayama	Honda HR12E	All
(Japan) Team Mugen	15	(Japan) Takuma Sato	Honda HR12E	1, 5–6, NC
(Japan) Team Mugen	15	(Japan) Takashi Kobayashi	Honda HR12E	2–4
(Japan) Team Mugen	16	(Japan) Naoki Yamamoto	Honda HR12E	All
(Hong Kong) KCMG	18	(United Kingdom) Richard Bradley	Toyota RV8K	All
(Japan) Lenovo Team Impul	19	(Brazil) João Paulo de Oliveira	Toyota RV8K	All
(Japan) Lenovo Team Impul	20	(Japan) Tsugio Matsuda	Toyota RV8K	All
(Japan) Nakajima Racing	31	(Japan) Daisuke Nakajima	Honda HR12E	All
(Japan) Nakajima Racing	32	(Japan) Takashi Kogure	Honda HR12E	All
(Japan) P.mu/cerumo・INGING	38	(Japan) Kohei Hirate	Toyota RV8K	All
(Japan) P.mu/cerumo・INGING	39	(Japan) Yuji Kunimoto	Toyota RV8K	All
(Japan) Docomo Team Dandelion Racing	40	(Japan) Takuya Izawa	Honda HR12E	All
(Japan) Docomo Team Dandelion Racing	41	(Japan) Hideki Mutoh	Honda HR12E	All
(Japan) Tochigi Le Beausset Motorsports	62	(Japan) Koki Saga	Toyota RV8K	All

== Race calendar and results ==
A provisional calendar for the 2013 season was released on 10 August 2012. All races were held in Japan.

Round	Circuit	Date	Pole position	Fastest lap	Winning driver	Winning team
1	Suzuka Circuit	14 April	(Japan) Takuya Izawa	(Japan) Takashi Kogure	(Japan) Takuya Izawa	Docomo Team Dandelion Racing
2	Autopolis	2 June	(Germany) André Lotterer	(Japan) Kazuki Nakajima	(Germany) André Lotterer	Petronas Team TOM'S
3	Fuji Speedway	14 July	(France) Loïc Duval	(Germany) André Lotterer	(Germany) André Lotterer	Petronas Team TOM'S
4	Twin Ring Motegi	4 August	(Japan) Kazuki Nakajima	(Germany) André Lotterer	(Japan) Kazuki Nakajima	Petronas Team TOM'S
5	Sportsland SUGO	29 September	(France) Loïc Duval	(Japan) Takashi Kogure	(France) Loïc Duval	Kygnus Sunoco Team LeMans
6	Suzuka Circuit	10 November	(Japan) Naoki Yamamoto	(Japan) Ryō Hirakawa	(Japan) Naoki Yamamoto	Team Mugen
6	Suzuka Circuit	10 November	(Japan) Naoki Yamamoto	(Japan) Ryō Hirakawa	(Japan) Kazuki Nakajima	Petronas Team TOM'S
NC	Fuji Speedway; Report	24 November	(Japan) Yuji Kunimoto	(Japan) Takuya Izawa	(Japan) Yuji Kunimoto	P.mu/cerumo・INGING

=== Calendar changes ===
- On 1 November the first Motegi round, scheduled for 12 May, was taken off the calendar for 2013.
- The race at Inje Speedium, scheduled for 25 August, was cancelled during the 2013 season.
- The non-championship JAF Grand Prix was originally scheduled for 17 November but was rescheduled to 24 November.

== Championship standings ==
=== Drivers' Championship ===
Scoring system

Round	1st	2nd	3rd	4th	5th	6th	7th	8th	Pole
1–5	10	8	6	5	4	3	2	1	1
6	8	4	3	2.5	2	1.5	1	0.5	1

Pos	Driver	SUZ	AUT	FUJ	MOT	SUG	SUZ		FUJ	Points
1	(Japan) Naoki Yamamoto	4	3	3	8	3	**1**	**3**	5	37
2	(Germany) André Lotterer		**1**	1	2	2			7	37
3	(France) Loïc Duval		2	**4**	3	**1**			2	31
4	(Japan) Kazuki Nakajima	5	12	8	**1**	Ret	Ret	1	4	24
5	(Brazil) João Paulo de Oliveira	6	4	6	4	Ret	3	17	6	19
6	(Japan) Tsugio Matsuda	2	5	16	13	5	4	16	3	18.5
7	(Japan) Takuya Izawa	**1**	Ret	5	Ret	Ret	10	9	15	15
8	(Japan) Takashi Kogure	3	Ret	14	5	8	15	2	18	15
9	(Japan) Kohei Hirate	12	Ret	2	15	Ret	5	7	9	11
10	(Japan) Yuji Kunimoto	10	10	7	6	4	Ret	15	**1**	10
11	(Japan) Ryō Hirakawa	8	7	11	7	Ret	6	4	8	9
12	(Japan) Daisuke Nakajima	16	Ret	11	10	7	2	11	Ret	6
13	(Italy) Andrea Caldarelli	7					Ret	5		4
14	(Japan) Hironobu Yasuda	14	9	12	Ret	6	8	13	11	3.5
15	(Japan) Koudai Tsukakoshi	9	6	9	9	Ret	Ret	Ret	10	3
16	(United Kingdom) James Rossiter	11					7	6		2.5
17	(Japan) Yuhki Nakayama	18	8	Ret	11	Ret	11	12	13	1
18	(Japan) Takuma Sato	15				11	9	8	14	0.5
19	(Japan) Koki Saga	17	11	Ret	16	9	14	14	16	0
20	(Japan) Hideki Mutoh	13	Ret	13	12	10	12	10	12	0
21	(United Kingdom) Richard Bradley	19	Ret	Ret	14	Ret	13	18	17	0
22	(Japan) Takashi Kobayashi		Ret	15	17					0
Pos	Driver	SUZ	AUT	FUJ	MOT	SUG	SUZ		FUJ	Points

Colour	Result
Gold	Winner
Silver	Second place
Bronze	Third place
Green	Points classification
Blue	Non-points classification
Blue	Non-classified finish (NC)
Purple	Retired, not classified (Ret)
Red	Did not qualify (DNQ)
Red	Did not pre-qualify (DNPQ)
Black	Disqualified (DSQ)
White	Did not start (DNS)
White	Withdrew (WD)
White	Race cancelled (C)
Blank	Did not practice (DNP)
Blank	Did not arrive (DNA)
Blank	Excluded (EX)

**Bold** – Pole
Italics – Fastest Lap

=== Teams' Championship ===
Pos	Team	No.	SUZ	AUT	FUJ	MOT	SUG	SUZ		FUJ	Points
1	Petronas Team TOM'S	1	5	12	8	**1**	2	Ret	1	4	58.5
1	Petronas Team TOM'S	2	11	**1**	1	2	Ret	7	6	7	58.5
2	Kygnus Sunoco Team LeMans	7	8	7	11	7	Ret	6	4	8	42
2	Kygnus Sunoco Team LeMans	8	7	2	**4**	3	**1**	Ret	5	2	42
3	Team Impul	19	6	4	6	4	Ret	3	17	6	37.5
3	Team Impul	20	2	5	16	13	5	4	16	3	37.5
4	Team Mugen	15	15	Ret	15	17	11	9	8	14	32.5
4	Team Mugen	16	4	3	3	8	3	**1**	**3**	5	32.5
5	P.mu/cerumo・INGING	38	12	Ret	2	15	Ret	5	7	9	21
5	P.mu/cerumo・INGING	39	10	10	7	6	4	Ret	15	**1**	21
6	Nakajima Racing	31	16	Ret	11	10	7	2	11	Ret	21
6	Nakajima Racing	32	3	Ret	14	5	8	Ret	2	18	21
7	Docomo Team Dandelion Racing	40	**1**	Ret	5	Ret	Ret	10	9	15	13
7	Docomo Team Dandelion Racing	41	13	Ret	13	12	10	12	10	12	13
8	HP Real Racing	10	9	6	9	9	Ret	Ret	Ret	10	4
8	HP Real Racing	11	18	8	Ret	11	Ret	11	12	13	4
9	Kondō Racing	3	14	9	12	Ret	6	8	13	11	3.5
	Tochigi Le Beausset Motorsports	62	17	11	Ret	16	9	14	14	16	0
	KCMG	18	19	Ret	Ret	14	Ret	13	18	17	0
Pos	Team	No.	SUZ	AUT	FUJ	MOT	SUG	SUZ		FUJ	Points

Colour	Result
Gold	Winner
Silver	Second place
Bronze	Third place
Green	Points classification
Blue	Non-points classification
Blue	Non-classified finish (NC)
Purple	Retired, not classified (Ret)
Red	Did not qualify (DNQ)
Red	Did not pre-qualify (DNPQ)
Black	Disqualified (DSQ)
White	Did not start (DNS)
White	Withdrew (WD)
White	Race cancelled (C)
Blank	Did not practice (DNP)
Blank	Did not arrive (DNA)
Blank	Excluded (EX)

**Bold** – Pole
Italics – Fastest Lap
