= 2012 Formula Nippon Championship =

Seasons
- ← 2011 2013 →

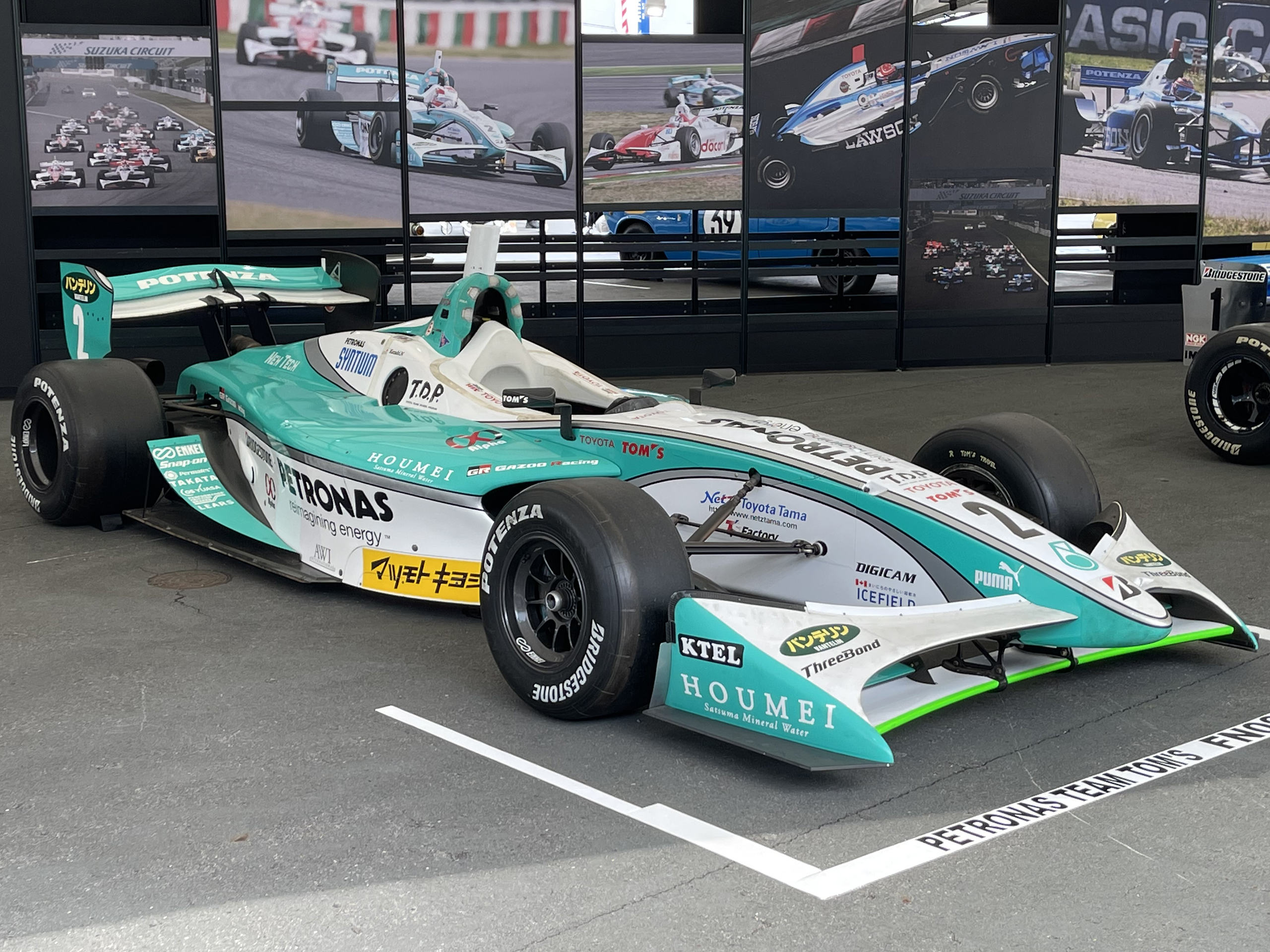
Car of 2012 champion Kazuki Nakajima, pictured in 2022

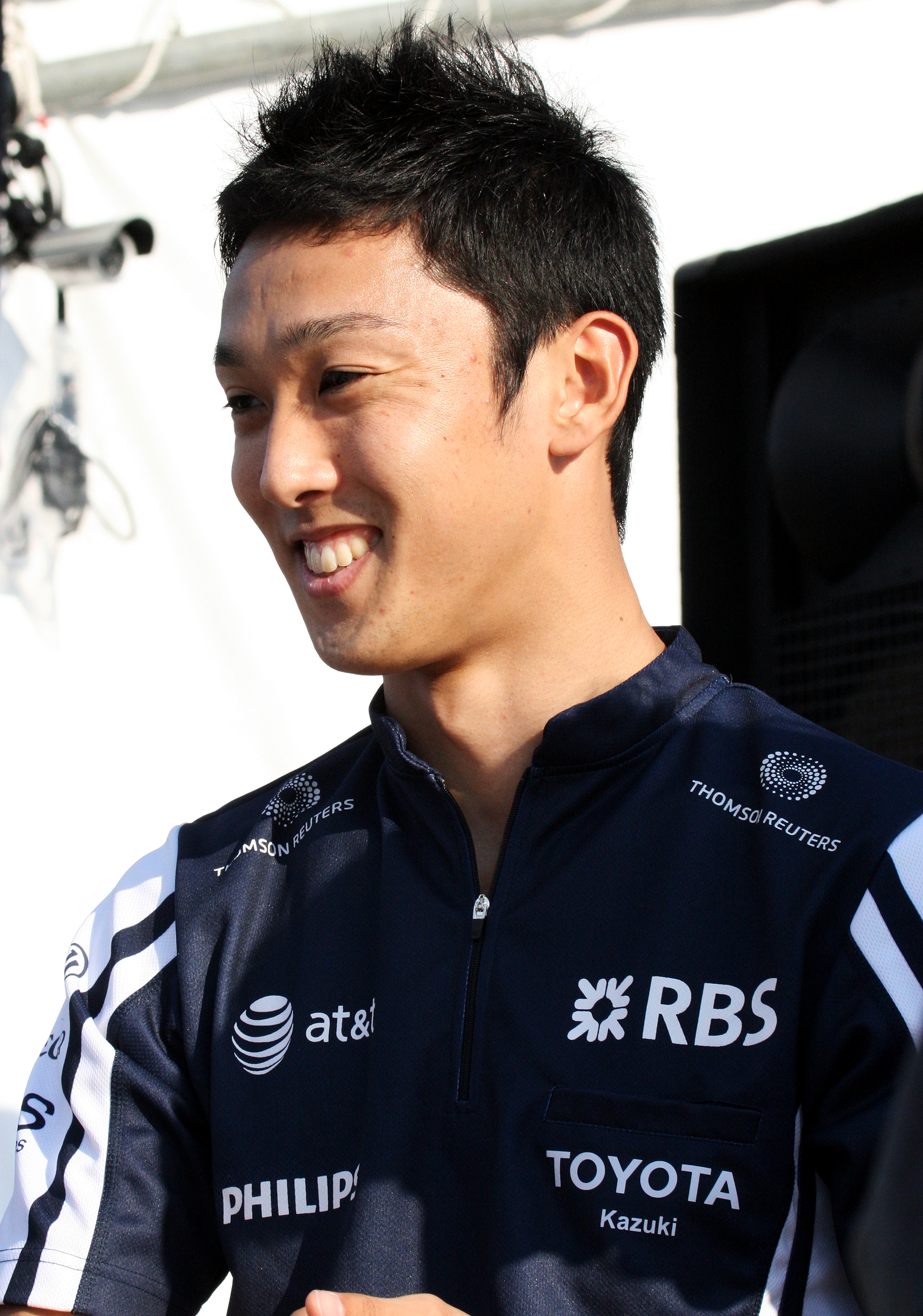
Kazuki Nakajima, the 2012 Formula Nippon champion.

The 2012 Formula Nippon Championship was the fortieth season of the premier Japanese open-wheel motor racing series. The series for Formula Nippon racing cars was contested over seven rounds with a non-championship final round at Fuji Speedway as part of the JAF Grand Prix. The two-time Le Mans winner André Lotterer was the defending champion.

This was also the final season run under the name Formula Nippon, the series would be renamed into Japanese Championship Super Formula, a name selected by public, in 2013.

== Teams and drivers ==
Team	No.	Driver	Engine	Rounds
(Japan) Petronas Team TOM'S	1	(Germany) André Lotterer	Toyota RV8K	All
(Japan) Petronas Team TOM'S	2	(Japan) Kazuki Nakajima	Toyota RV8K	All
(Japan) Kondō Racing	3	(Japan) Hironobu Yasuda	Toyota RV8K	All
(Japan) Team LeMans	7	(Japan) Kazuya Oshima	Toyota RV8K	All
(Japan) Team Kygnus Sunoco	8	(France) Loïc Duval	Toyota RV8K	All
(Japan) HP Real Racing	10	(Japan) Toshihiro Kaneishi	Honda HR12E	All
(Japan) HP Real Racing	11	(Japan) Yuhki Nakayama	Honda HR12E	4–5
(Japan) Team Mugen	15	(Japan) Takuma Sato	Honda HR12E	6–7
(Japan) Team Mugen	16	(Japan) Naoki Yamamoto	Honda HR12E	All
(Japan) SGC by KCMG	18	(Japan) Ryo Orime	Toyota RV8K	All
(Japan) Team Impul	19	(Brazil) João Paulo de Oliveira	Toyota RV8K	All
(Japan) Team Impul	20	(Japan) Tsugio Matsuda	Toyota RV8K	All
(Japan) Nakajima Racing	31	(Japan) Daisuke Nakajima	Honda HR12E	All
(Japan) Nakajima Racing	32	(Japan) Takashi Kogure	Honda HR12E	All
(Japan) Project μ/cerumo・INGING	38	(Japan) Kohei Hirate	Toyota RV8K	All
(Japan) Project μ/cerumo・INGING	39	(Japan) Yuji Kunimoto	Toyota RV8K	All
(Japan) Docomo Team Dandelion Racing	40	(Japan) Takuya Izawa	Honda HR12E	All
(Japan) Docomo Team Dandelion Racing	41	(Japan) Koudai Tsukakoshi	Honda HR12E	All
(Japan) Le Beausset Motorsports	62	(Japan) Koki Saga	Toyota RV8K	All

Note:All drivers (except Yuhki Nakayama) also participated the non-Championship JAF Grand Prix.

== Race calendar and results ==
2012 venues
- All races will be held in Japan. A non-championship round, entitled JAF Grand Prix Super GT and Formula Nippon Sprint Cup 2012, will be held at the conclusion of the season.

Round	Circuit	Date	Pole position	Fastest lap	Winning driver	Winning team
1	Suzuka Circuit	15 April	(Japan) Takuya Izawa	(Brazil) João Paulo de Oliveira	(Japan) Kazuki Nakajima	Petronas Team TOM'S
2	Twin Ring Motegi	13 May	(Germany) André Lotterer	(Brazil) João Paulo de Oliveira	(Germany) André Lotterer	Petronas Team TOM'S
3	Autopolis	27 May	(Japan) Koudai Tsukakoshi	(Japan) Hironobu Yasuda	(Japan) Koudai Tsukakoshi	Docomo Team Dandelion Racing
4	Fuji Speedway	15 July	(Japan) Kazuki Nakajima	(Brazil) João Paulo de Oliveira	(Germany) André Lotterer	Petronas Team TOM'S
5	Twin Ring Motegi	5 August	(Brazil) João Paulo de Oliveira	(Japan) Hironobu Yasuda	(Brazil) João Paulo de Oliveira	Team Impul
6	Sportsland SUGO	23 September	(Japan) Takuya Izawa	(France) Loïc Duval	(Japan) Takuya Izawa	Docomo Team Dandelion Racing
7	Suzuka Circuit	4 November	(Japan) Tsugio Matsuda	(Japan) Takuya Izawa	(Japan) Takuya Izawa	Docomo Team Dandelion Racing
7	Suzuka Circuit	4 November	(Brazil) João Paulo de Oliveira	(Japan) Kohei Hirate	(Japan) Kazuki Nakajima	Petronas Team TOM'S
NC	Fuji Speedway	18 November	(Japan) Koudai Tsukakoshi	(Brazil) João Paulo de Oliveira	(Japan) Takuya Izawa	Docomo Team Dandelion Racing

== Championship standings ==
=== Drivers' Championship ===
Scoring system

Round	Position	1st	2nd	3rd	4th	5th	6th	7th	8th	Pole
1–6	Points	10	8	6	5	4	3	2	1	1
7	Points	8	4	3	2.5	2	1.5	1	0.5	1

Pos	Driver	SUZ	MOT	AUT	FUJ	MOT	SUG	SUZ		FUJ	Points
1	(Japan) Kazuki Nakajima	1	3	5	**2**	4	5	12	1	7	46
2	(Japan) Koudai Tsukakoshi	2	5	**1**	9	3	2	3	3	**Ret**	43
3	(Japan) Takuya Izawa	**6**	4	2	13	5	**1**	1	6	1	41.5
4	(Germany) André Lotterer	5	**1**	Ret	1	2	10	5	8	DSQ	35.5
5	(Brazil) João Paulo de Oliveira	3	2	Ret	6	**1**	6	4	**Ret**	2	34.5
6	(France) Loïc Duval	9	11	3	4	6	3	7	2	3	25
7	(Japan) Kazuya Oshima	4	8	6	3	Ret	4	8	7	10	21.5
8	(Japan) Tsugio Matsuda	8	6	4	5	7	Ret	**2**	Ret	5	20
9	(Japan) Kohei Hirate	10	NC	7	7	8	8	9	5	6	8
10	(Japan) Takashi Kogure	15	Ret	10	10	13	Ret	6	4	11	4
11	(Japan) Naoki Yamamoto	7	7	9	12	Ret	14	15	Ret	8	4
12	(Japan) Toshihiro Kaneishi	12	13	12	Ret	11	7	14	14	12	2
13	(Japan) Yuji Kunimoto	14	9	8	8	10	13	11	12	4	2
14	(Japan) Hironobu Yasuda	11	12	13	16	9	11	13	9	16	0
15	(Japan) Takuma Sato						9	17	10	13	0
16	(Japan) Daisuke Nakajima	16	10	11	11	12	12	10	11	9	0
17	(Japan) Koki Saga	13	14	Ret	14	Ret	15	16	13	14	0
18	(Japan) Yuhki Nakayama				15	14					0
19	(Japan) Ryo Orime	17	15	Ret	Ret	Ret	Ret	18	15	15	0
Pos	Driver	SUZ	MOT	AUT	FUJ	MOT	SUG	SUZ		FUJ	Points

Colour	Result
Gold	Winner
Silver	Second place
Bronze	Third place
Green	Points classification
Blue	Non-points classification
Blue	Non-classified finish (NC)
Purple	Retired, not classified (Ret)
Red	Did not qualify (DNQ)
Red	Did not pre-qualify (DNPQ)
Black	Disqualified (DSQ)
White	Did not start (DNS)
White	Withdrew (WD)
White	Race cancelled (C)
Blank	Did not practice (DNP)
Blank	Did not arrive (DNA)
Blank	Excluded (EX)

**Bold** – Pole
Italics – Fastest Lap

=== Teams' Championship ===
Pos	Team	No.	SUZ	MOT	AUT	FUJ	MOT	SUG	SUZ		FUJ	Points
1	Docomo Team Dandelion Racing	40	**6**	4	2	13	5	**1**	1	6	1	78.5
1	Docomo Team Dandelion Racing	41	2	5	**1**	9	3	2	3	3	**Ret**	78.5
2	Petronas Team TOM'S	1	5	**1**	Ret	1	2	10	5	8	DSQ	76.5
2	Petronas Team TOM'S	2	1	3	5	**2**	4	5	12	1	7	76.5
3	Team Impul	19	3	2	Ret	6	**1**	6	4	**Ret**	2	51.5
3	Team Impul	20	8	6	4	5	7	Ret	**2**	Ret	5	51.5
4	Team Kygnus Sunoco	8	9	11	3	4	6	3	7	2	3	25
5	Team LeMans	7	4	8	6	3	Ret	4	8	7	10	21.5
6	Project μ/cerumo・INGING	38	10	NC	7	7	8	8	9	5	6	10
6	Project μ/cerumo・INGING	39	14	9	8	8	10	13	11	12	4	10
7	Nakajima Racing	31	16	10	11	11	12	12	10	11	9	4
7	Nakajima Racing	32	15	Ret	10	10	13	Ret	6	4	11	4
8	Mugen	15						9	17	10	13	4
8	Mugen	16	7	7	9	12	Ret	14	15	Ret	8	4
9	HP Real Racing	10	12	13	12	Ret	11	7	14	14	12	2
9	HP Real Racing	11				15	14					2
10	Kondō Racing	3	11	12	13	16	9	11	13	9	16	0
11	Le Beausset Motorsports	62	13	14	Ret	14		15	16	13	14	0
12	SGC by KCMG	18	17	15	Ret	Ret	Ret	Ret	18	15	15	0
Pos	Team	No.	SUZ	MOT	AUT	FUJ	MOT	SUG	SUZ		FUJ	Points

Colour	Result
Gold	Winner
Silver	Second place
Bronze	Third place
Green	Points classification
Blue	Non-points classification
Blue	Non-classified finish (NC)
Purple	Retired, not classified (Ret)
Red	Did not qualify (DNQ)
Red	Did not pre-qualify (DNPQ)
Black	Disqualified (DSQ)
White	Did not start (DNS)
White	Withdrew (WD)
White	Race cancelled (C)
Blank	Did not practice (DNP)
Blank	Did not arrive (DNA)
Blank	Excluded (EX)

**Bold** – Pole
Italics – Fastest Lap
