= 2011 Formula Nippon Championship =

The 2011 Formula Nippon Championship was the thirty-ninth season of the premier Japanese open-wheel motor racing series. The series for Formula Nippon racing cars was contested over seven rounds.

== Teams and drivers ==
Team	No.	Driver	Engine	Rounds
(Japan) Team Impul	1	(Brazil) João Paulo de Oliveira	Toyota RV8K	All *
(Japan) Team Impul	2	(Japan) Kohei Hirate	Toyota RV8K	All *
(Japan) Kondō Racing	3	(Italy) Andrea Caldarelli	Toyota RV8K	All *
(Japan) Team LeMans	7	(Japan) Kazuya Oshima	Toyota RV8K	All *
(Japan) Team Kygnus Sunoco	8	(Japan) Hiroaki Ishiura	Toyota RV8K	All *
(Japan) Real Racing	10	(Japan) Takashi Kobayashi	Honda HR10E	All *
(Japan) Real Racing	11	(Japan) Hideki Mutoh	Honda HR10E	4, 7
(Japan) Team Mugen	16	(Japan) Naoki Yamamoto	Honda HR10E	All *
(Hong Kong) SGC by KCMG	18	(Switzerland) Alexandre Imperatori	Toyota RV8K	All
(Hong Kong) SGC by KCMG	18	(Japan) Tsugio Matsuda	Toyota RV8K	*
(Japan) Nakajima Racing	31	(Japan) Daisuke Nakajima	Honda HR10E	All *
(Japan) Nakajima Racing	32	(Japan) Takashi Kogure	Honda HR10E	All *
(Japan) Project μ/cerumo・INGING	33	(Japan) Yuji Kunimoto	Toyota RV8K	All *
(Japan) Petronas Team TOM'S	36	(Germany) André Lotterer	Toyota RV8K	1, 3–7 *
(Japan) Petronas Team TOM'S	36	(Japan) Takuto Iguchi	Toyota RV8K	2
(Japan) Petronas Team TOM'S	37	(Japan) Kazuki Nakajima	Toyota RV8K	All *
(Japan) Docomo Team Dandelion Racing	40	(Japan) Takuya Izawa	Honda HR10E	All *
(Japan) Docomo Team Dandelion Racing	41	(Japan) Koudai Tsukakoshi	Honda HR10E	All *
(Japan) Le Beausset Motorsports	62	(Japan) Koki Saga	Toyota RV8K	All *

* Drivers who participated in the non-championship round at Fuji Speedway.

== Race calendar and results ==
2011 venues
- All races will be held in Japan. A non-championship round, entitled Super GT and Formula Nippon Sprint Cup 2011, will be held at the conclusion of the season. The opening round at Suzuka was rescheduled from 16–17 April to 14–15 May due to the Tōhoku earthquake and tsunami that hit Japan in March. As a result, the first Twin Ring Motegi round scheduled for that weekend was rescheduled to 6 November with the originally scheduled Suzuka race moved forward to September.

Round	Circuit	Date	Pole position	Fastest lap	Winning driver	Winning team
1	Suzuka Circuit	15 May	(Japan) Naoki Yamamoto	(Japan) Naoki Yamamoto	(Germany) André Lotterer	Petronas Team TOM'S
2	Autopolis	5 June	(Japan) Koudai Tsukakoshi	(Japan) Kohei Hirate	(Japan) Kazuki Nakajima	Petronas Team TOM'S
3	Fuji Speedway	17 July	(Brazil) João Paulo de Oliveira	(Brazil) João Paulo de Oliveira	(Germany) André Lotterer	Petronas Team TOM'S
4	Twin Ring Motegi	7 August	(Brazil) João Paulo de Oliveira	(Brazil) João Paulo de Oliveira	(Brazil) João Paulo de Oliveira	Team Impul
5	Suzuka Circuit	4 September	Race cancelled due to Typhoon Talas			
6	Sportsland SUGO	25 September	(Japan) Kazuya Oshima	(Japan) Hiroaki Ishiura	(Germany) André Lotterer	Petronas Team TOM'S
7	Twin Ring Motegi	6 November	(Germany) André Lotterer	(Japan) Kazuki Nakajima	(Germany) André Lotterer	Petronas Team TOM'S
7	Twin Ring Motegi	6 November	(Germany) André Lotterer	(Germany) André Lotterer	(Germany) André Lotterer	Petronas Team TOM'S
NC	Fuji Speedway	13 November	(Brazil) João Paulo de Oliveira	(Brazil) João Paulo de Oliveira	(Brazil) João Paulo de Oliveira	Team Impul

== Championship standings ==
=== Drivers' Championship ===
Scoring system

Round	Position	1st	2nd	3rd	4th	5th	6th	7th	8th	Pole
1–6	Points	10	8	6	5	4	3	2	1	1
7	Points	8	4	3	2.5	2	1.5	1	0.5	1

Pos	Driver	SUZ	AUT	FUJ	MOT	SUZ	SUG	MOT		FUJ	Points
1	(Germany) André Lotterer	1		1	2	C	1	**1**	**1**	5	56
2	(Japan) Kazuki Nakajima	3	1	3	3	C	3	2	2	3	42
3	(Brazil) João Paulo de Oliveira	6	4	**4**	**1**	C	DSQ	9	3	**1**	28
4	(Japan) Koudai Tsukakoshi	7	**3**	5	4	C	4	3	8	7	26.5
5	(Japan) Kazuya Oshima	5	2	12	8	C	**6**	Ret	5	4	19
6	(Japan) Hiroaki Ishiura	8	10	6	7	C	2	6	6	2	17
7	(Japan) Takashi Kogure	2	Ret	7	Ret	C	7	5	4	12	16.5
8	(Japan) Kohei Hirate	9	8	2	5	C	8	7	Ret	10	15
9	(Japan) Takuya Izawa	4	6	10	6	C	DSQ	Ret	10	6	11
10	(Japan) Yuji Kunimoto	13	11	15	12	C	5	4	Ret	Ret	6.5
11	(Japan) Naoki Yamamoto	**Ret**	5	9	14	C	11	12	NC	8	5
12	(Switzerland) Alexandre Imperatori	10	7	Ret	11	C	12	8	12		2.5
13	(Japan) Daisuke Nakajima	11	Ret	8	9	C	10	11	7	Ret	2
14	(Japan) Takashi Kobayashi	Ret	9	11	15	C	Ret	10	11	11	0
15	(Japan) Hideki Mutoh				10			Ret	9		0
16	(Italy) Andrea Caldarelli	Ret	Ret	13	13	C	9	Ret	Ret	9	0
17	(Japan) Koki Saga	12	Ret	14	16	C	13	13	Ret	13	0
18	(Japan) Takuto Iguchi		12								0
	(Japan) Tsugio Matsuda									14	0
Pos	Driver	SUZ	AUT	FUJ	MOT	SUZ	SUG	MOT		FUJ	Points

Colour	Result
Gold	Winner
Silver	Second place
Bronze	Third place
Green	Points classification
Blue	Non-points classification
Blue	Non-classified finish (NC)
Purple	Retired, not classified (Ret)
Red	Did not qualify (DNQ)
Red	Did not pre-qualify (DNPQ)
Black	Disqualified (DSQ)
White	Did not start (DNS)
White	Withdrew (WD)
White	Race cancelled (C)
Blank	Did not practice (DNP)
Blank	Did not arrive (DNA)
Blank	Excluded (EX)

**Bold** – Pole
Italics – Fastest Lap

=== Teams' Championship ===
Pos	Team	SUZ	AUT	FUJ	MOT	SUZ	SUG	MOT		Points
1	Petronas Team TOM'S	1	1	1	2	C	1	1	1	96
1	Petronas Team TOM'S	3	12	3	3	C	3	2	2	96
2	Team Impul	6	4	2	1	C	8	7	3	41
2	Team Impul	9	8	4	5	C	DSQ	9	Ret	41
3	Docomo Team Dandelion Racing	4	3	5	4	C	4	3	8	36.5
3	Docomo Team Dandelion Racing	7	6	10	6	C	DSQ	Ret	10	36.5
4	Team LeMans; Team Kygnus Sunoco	5	2	6	7	C	2	Ret	5	32
4	Team LeMans; Team Kygnus Sunoco	8	10	12	8	C	6			32
5	Nakajima Racing	2	Ret	7	9	C	7	5	4	18.5
5	Nakajima Racing	11	Ret	8	Ret	C	10	11	7	18.5
6	Project μ/cerumo・INGING	13	11	15	12	C	5	4	Ret	6.5
7	Team Mugen	Ret	5	9	14	C	11	12	NC	4
8	Team Kygnus Sunoco							6	6	3
9	SGC by KCMG	10	7	Ret	11	C	12	8	12	2.5
10	HP Real Racing	Ret	9	11	10	C	Ret	10	9	0
10	HP Real Racing				15			Ret	11	0
11	Kondō Racing	Ret	Ret	13	13	C	9	Ret	Ret	0
12	Le Beausset Motorsports	12	Ret	14	16	C	13	13	Ret	0
Pos	Team	SUZ	AUT	FUJ	MOT	SUZ	SUG	MOT		Points

Colour	Result
Gold	Winner
Silver	Second place
Bronze	Third place
Green	Points classification
Blue	Non-points classification
Blue	Non-classified finish (NC)
Purple	Retired, not classified (Ret)
Red	Did not qualify (DNQ)
Red	Did not pre-qualify (DNPQ)
Black	Disqualified (DSQ)
White	Did not start (DNS)
White	Withdrew (WD)
White	Race cancelled (C)
Blank	Did not practice (DNP)
Blank	Did not arrive (DNA)
Blank	Excluded (EX)
