= Hironobu Yasuda =

Japanese racing driver

- Nationality: Japanese
- Born: November 11, 1983 (age 43) Shiga

Super GT career
- Debut season: 2006
- Current team: Anest Iwata Racing
- Car number: 26
- Former teams: MOLA, Nismo, Hasemi, Kondo Racing, Impul, Gainer
- Starts: 60
- Wins: 3
- Best finish: 1st in 2008

Previous series
- 2012-2013 2007-2009: Super Formula; All-Japan Formula Three

Championship titles
- 2008: Super GT GT300

Hironobu Yasuda (安田裕信, Yasuda Hironobu; born November 11, 1983 in Shiga) is a Japanese racing driver. He currently drives in the Super GT series in the GT300 category for Anest Iwata Racing.

In 2008, Yasuda won the GT300 class in the Super GT championship, co-driving with Kazuki Hoshino. In 2009, he made his full season debut in the GT500 class in the Super GT series.

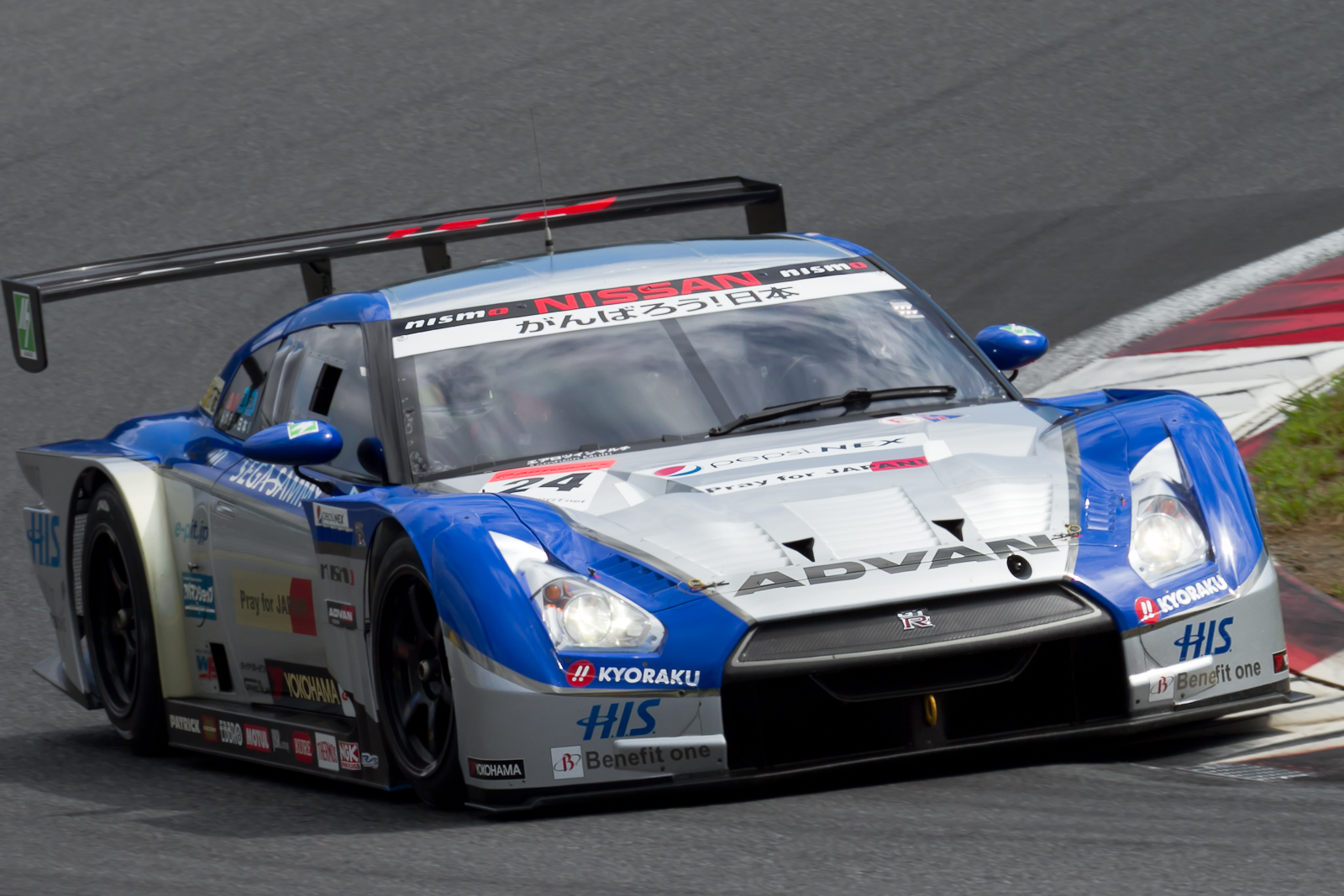
Yasuda driving the Nissan GT-R GT500 for Kondo Racing in 2011.

== Racing record ==
=== Complete Japanese Formula 3 results ===
(key) (Races in bold indicate pole position) (Races in italics indicate fastest lap)

Year	Team	Engine	1	2	3	4	5	6	7	8	9	10	11	12	13	14	15	16	17	18	19	20	DC	Pts
2007	ThreeBond Racing	Nissan	FUJ; 1; 8	FUJ; 2; 7	SUZ; 1 Ret	SUZ; 2; 9	MOT; 1; 9	MOT; 2; 8	OKA; 1; 8	OKA; 2; 10	SUZ; 1; 5	SUZ; 2; 7	AUT; 1; 8	AUT; 2; 7	AUT; 3; 10	FUJ; 1; 7	FUJ; 2; 7	SEN; 1; 4	SEN; 2; 10	SEN; 3; 6	MOT; 1; 6	MOT; 2; 4	8th	79
2008	ThreeBond Racing	Nissan	FUJ; 1 DNS	FUJ; 2; 4	AUT; 1; 6	AUT; 2; 6	**SUZ**; **1**; 1	**SUZ**; **2**; 2	MOT; 1; 3	MOT; 2; 1	OKA; 1; 4	OKA; 2; 8	SUZ; 1; 6	SUZ; 2; 5	MOT; 1 Ret	MOT; 2; 8	FUJ; 1; 8	FUJ; 2; 5	SUG; 1; 4	SUG; 2; 5			4th	152
2009	ThreeBond Racing	Nissan	FUJ; 1; 7	FUJ; 2; 16	**OKA**; **1**; 5	OKA; 2; 1	SUZ; 1; 4	SUZ; 2; 4	FUJ; 1 Ret	FUJ; 2; 4	SUZ; 1; 3	SUZ; 2 Ret	MOT; 1; 4	MOT; 2; 3	AUT; 1; 6	AUT; 2; 2	SUG; 1; 5	SUG; 2; 2					5th	53
2011	ThreeBond Racing	Nissan	**SUZ**; **1**; 8	SUZ; 2; 1	**FUJ**; **1**; 2	**FUJ**; **2**; 1	FUJ; 3; 2	FUJ; 1; 2	FUJ; 2; 1	MOT; 1; 3	MOT; 2; 2	OKA; 1; 1	OKA; 2; 2	SUZ; 1 C	SUZ; 2 C	SUG; 1; 2	SUG; 2; 7	SUG; 3; 4					**2nd**	**99**

=== Complete Super GT results ===
(key) (Races in bold indicate pole position) (Races in italics indicate fastest lap)

Year	Team	Car	Class	1	2	3	4	5	6	7	8	9	DC	Pts
2006	MOLA	Nissan Fairlady Z	GT300	SUZ; 10	OKA; 18	FUJ; 14	SEP; 10	SUG; 8	SUZ; 6	MOT; 8	AUT; 10	FUJ; 19	20th	20
2007	NISMO	Nissan Fairlady Z	GT500	SUZ	OKA	FUJ	SEP	SUG	SUZ; 3	MOT	AUT	FUJ	20th	12
2008	MOLA	Nissan Fairlady Z	GT300	SUZ; Ret	OKA; 4	FUJ; 2	SEP; 2	SUG; 5	SUZ; 1	MOT; 7	AUT; 4	FUJ; 6	1st	78
2009	Hasemi Motorsport	Nissan GT-R	GT500	OKA; 12	SUZ; 13	FUJ; 7	SEP; 1	**SUG**; 9	SUZ; 2	FUJ; 6	AUT; 8	MOT; 12	7th	49
2010	Kondo Racing	Nissan GT-R	GT500	SUZ; 1	OKA; 12	FUJ; 8	SEP; 9	SUG; 5	SUZ; Ret	FUJ; C	MOT; 10		10th	32
2011	Kondo Racing	Nissan GT-R	GT500	OKA; 9	FUJ; 7	SEP; 4	SUG; 4	SUZ; 10	FUJ; 11	AUT; 5	MOT; 12		10th	29
2012	Kondo Racing	Nissan GT-R	GT500	OKA; 11	FUJ; 14	SEP; Ret	SUG; 10	SUZ; 3	FUJ; 13	AUT; 4	MOT; 11		15th	22
2013	Kondo Racing	Nissan GT-R	GT500	OKA; 13	FUJ; 12	SEP; 13	SUG; 5	SUZ; Ret	FUJ; 10	AUT; 6	MOT; 9		13th	14
2014	Impul	Nissan GT-R	GT500	OKA; 3	**FUJ**; 1	AUT; 3	SUG; 9	FUJ; 8	SUZ; 10	BUR; 3	MOT; 13		6th	60
2015	Calsonic Team Impul	Nissan GT-R	GT500	OKA; 7	FUJ; 2	CHA; 4	FUJ; 3	SUZ; 3	SUG; 11	**AUT**; 2	MOT; 4		2nd	74
2016	Team Impul	Nissan GT-R	GT500	OKA; 5	FUJ; 11	SUG; Ret	FUJ; 1	SUZ; Ret	CHA; 4	MOT; 7	MOT; 8		8th	43
2017	Team Impul	Nissan GT-R	GT500	OKA; 8	**FUJ**; 14	AUT; 7	SUG; 11	FUJ; 5	SUZ; 11	BUR; 14	MOT; 7		15th	17
2018	GAINER	Nissan GT-R	GT300	OKA; 5	**FUJ**; 3	SUZ; 16	BUR; 1	FUJ; 22	SUG; 19	AUT; 6	MOT; 5		5th	48
2019	GAINER	Nissan GT-R	GT300	OKA; 21	**FUJ**; 1	SUZ; 9	BUR; 8	FUJ; 9	SUG; 15	AUT; 22	MOT; 1		3rd	48
2020	GAINER	Nissan GT-R	GT300	FUJ; 2	FUJ; 21	SUZ; 1	MOT; 6	FUJ; 10	SUZ; 15	MOT; 9	FUJ; 18		6th	43
2021	GAINER	Nissan GT-R	GT300	OKA; 4	FUJ; 16	MOT; 2	SUZ; 26	SUG; 10	AUT; 5	MOT; 8	FUJ; 8		7th	38
2022	GAINER	Nissan GT-R	GT300	OKA; 10	FUJ; 4	SUZ; Ret	FUJ; 2	SUZ; 16	SUG; 2	AUT; 14	MOT; 14		7th	35
2023	GAINER	Nissan GT-R	GT300	OKA; 11	FUJ; 5	SUZ; 8	FUJ; 7	SUZ; 13	SUG; 9	AUT; 10	MOT; 16		17th	16
2025	Anest Iwata Racing	Lexus RC F GT3	GT300	OKA; 2	FUJ; 11	SEP	FS1 (14)	FS2; 18	SUG; Ret	AUT; Ret	MOT; 11	SUZ; 20	18th	31
2026	Anest Iwata Racing	Nissan Fairlady Z GT300 (RZ34)	GT300	OKA; 21	FUJ; 26	FUJ; 29	SUZ; 23	SUG; 22	AUT; 9	MOT; DSQ	MOT; 12		34th	11

=== Complete Formula Nippon/Super Formula results ===
(key) (Races in bold indicate pole position) (Races in italics indicate fastest lap)

Year	Entrant	1	2	3	4	5	6	7	8	DC	Points
2012	Kondo Racing	SUZ; 11	MOT; 12	AUT; 13	FUJ; 16	MOT; 9	SUG; 11	SUZ1; 13	SUZ2; 9	NC	0
2013	Kondo Racing	SUZ; 14	AUT; 9	FUJ; 12	MOT; Ret	SUG; 6	SUZ1; 8	SUZ2; 13		14th	3.5
