= Daisuke Nakajima =

Japanese airline pilot and retired racing driver (b. 1989)

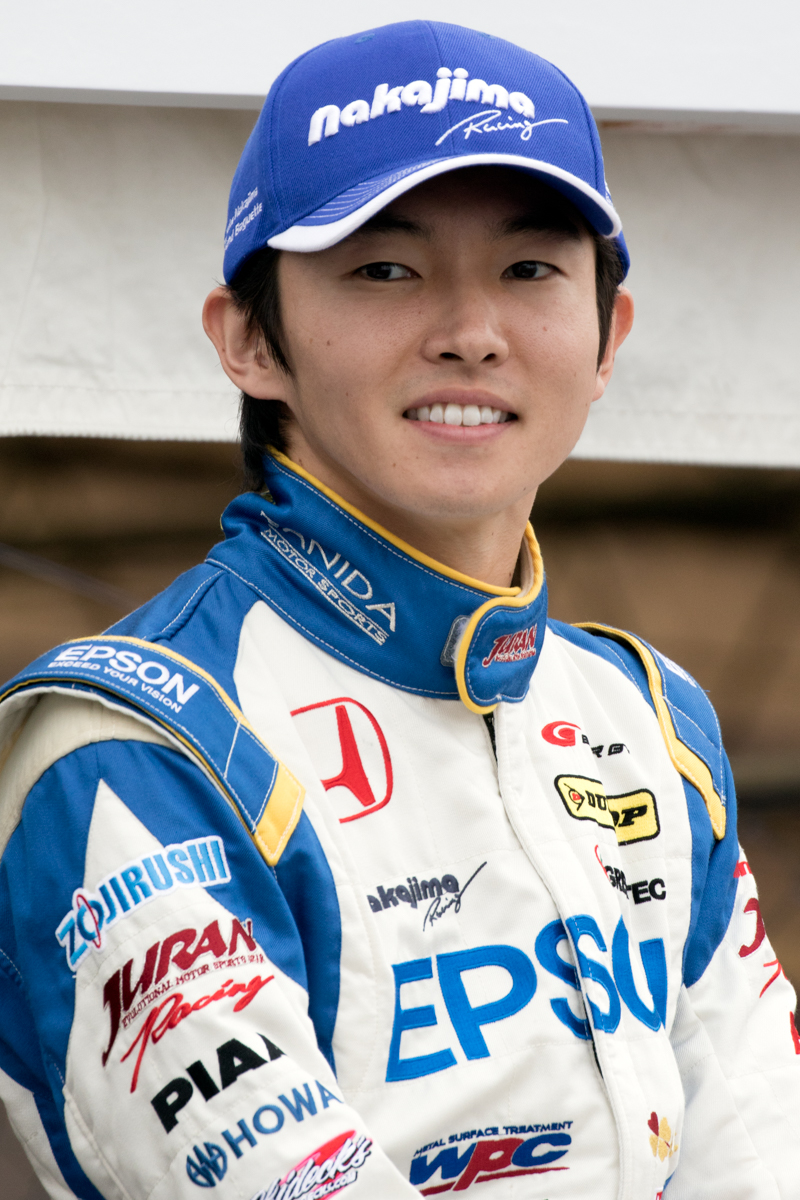
- Nakajima in 2015
- Nationality: (Japan) Japanese
- Born: January 29, 1989 (age 37) Okazaki, Japan
- Relatives: Kazuki Nakajima (brother); Satoru Nakajima (father)

Super Formula career
- Debut season: 2011
- Current team: Nakajima Racing
- Categorisation: FIA Gold
- Car number: 31
- Starts: 54
- Wins: 0
- Poles: 0
- Fastest laps: 0
- Best finish: 10th in 2015

Previous series
- 2012-2015 2009-2010 2008 2007: Super GT; British Formula 3 All-Japan Formula Three; Formula Challenge

Daisuke Nakajima (中嶋 大祐, Nakajima Daisuke; born January 29, 1989) is a Japanese airline pilot and retired racing driver. He is the son of Satoru Nakajima and the younger brother of Kazuki Nakajima, both of whom have driven in Formula One.

== Career ==
Having started his career in go-karts on the Japanese circuit, Nakajima moved into single-seaters in 2007, competing in the Japanese Formula Challenge series. He finished fifth overall in the championship with four wins, which was won by 2008 Macau Grand Prix winner Keisuke Kunimoto. He graduated into All-Japan Formula Three in 2008, with Toda Racing, finishing ninth overall. Having tested with Räikkönen Robertson Racing over the 2008 offseason, Nakajima joined them for a 2009 campaign in the British Formula 3 Championship. Nakajima finished seventh in the championship standings, with his best result of second coming at Silverstone in August, having started from pole position. He remained with the team for the 2010 season, but failed to improve on his rookie form and returned to Japan for 2011, competing in Formula Nippon with his father's team.

Nakajima retired from racing at the end of the 2019 Super GT Series; following his retirement from racing he became a commercial airline pilot for Peach Aviation in 2021.

== Racing record ==
=== Career summary ===
Season	Series	Team name	Races	Wins	Poles	F/Laps	Podiums	Points	Position
2007	Formula Challenge Japan		18	4	4	2	5	121	5th
2008	Japanese Formula 3 Championship	Toda Racing	18	0	0	0	0	54	9th
2009	British Formula 3 Championship	Räikkönen Robertson Racing	20	0	1	0	2	95	7th
2009	Masters of Formula 3	Räikkönen Robertson Racing	1	0	0	0	0	N/A	19th
2010	British Formula 3 Championship	Räikkönen Robertson Racing	30	0	1	0	4	97	11th
2011	Formula Nippon	Nakajima Racing	7	0	0	0	0	2	13th
2012	Super GT - GT300	Mugen	5	0	0	0	1	12	15th
2012	Formula Nippon	Nakajima Racing	8	0	0	0	0	0	16th
2013	Super GT - GT500	Nakajima Racing	8	0	0	0	0	4	15th
2013	Super Formula	Nakajima Racing	7	0	0	0	1	6	12th
2014	Super GT - GT500	Nakajima Racing	8	0	0	0	1	12	17th
2014	Super Formula	Nakajima Racing	9	0	0	0	0	4	14th
2015	Super GT - GT500	Nakajima Racing	8	0	0	0	0	4	15th
2015	Super Formula	Nakajima Racing	8	0	0	0	0	7	10th
2016	Super GT - GT500	Nakajima Racing	8	0	0	0	0	7	18th
2016	Super Formula	Nakajima Racing	8	0	0	0	1	10.5	12th
2017	Super GT - GT500	Team Mugen	8	0	0	0	0	7	18th
2017	Super Formula	TCS Nakajima Racing	7	0	0	0	0	2	16th
2018	Super GT - GT500	Team Mugen	8	0	1	1	0	16	15th
2019	Super GT - GT500	Team Mugen	8	0	0	0	0	12	15th
2019	Intercontinental GT Challenge	Modulo Drago Corse	1	0	0	0	0	0	NC

=== Complete Formula Nippon/Super Formula results ===
(key)

Year	Team	Engine	1	2	3	4	5	6	7	8	9	DC	Points
2011	Nakajima Racing	Honda	SUZ; 11	AUT; Ret	FUJ; 8	MOT; 9	SUZ; C	SUG; 10	MOT; 11	MOT; 7		13th	2
2012	Nakajima Racing	Honda	SUZ; 16	MOT; 10	AUT; 11	FUJ; 11	MOT; 12	SUG; 12	SUZ; 10	SUZ; 11		16th	0
2013	Nakajima Racing	Honda	SUZ; 16	AUT; Ret	FUJ; 11	MOT; 10	SUG; 7	SUZ; 2	SUZ; 11			12th	6
2014	Nakajima Racing	Honda	SUZ; Ret	FUJ; 9	FUJ; 14	FUJ; 9	MOT; 16	AUT; 12	SUG; 5	SUZ; 9	SUZ; 15	14th	4
2015	Nakajima Racing	Honda	SUZ; 6	OKA; 12	FUJ; Ret	MOT; 5	AUT; 9	SUG; 12	SUZ; Ret	SUZ; 10		10th	7
2016	Nakajima Racing	Honda	SUZ; Ret	OKA; 7	FUJ; DNS	MOT; 10	OKA; 6	OKA; 12	SUG; 2	SUZ; 10	SUZ; 10	12th	10.5
2017	TCS Nakajima Racing	Honda	SUZ; 7	OKA; 16	OKA; 14	FUJ; 11	MOT; 12	AUT; 11	SUG; 17	SUZ; C	SUZ; C	16th	2

=== Complete Super GT results ===
Year	Team	Car	Class	1	2	3	4	5	6	7	8	DC	Points
2012	Team Mugen	Honda CR-Z	GT300	OKA	FUJ	SEP	SUG; 16	SUZ; 11	FUJ; 3	AUT; 10	MOT; 11	15th	12
2013	Epson Nakajima Racing	Honda HSV-010 GT	GT500	OKA; 11	FUJ; 13	SEP; 12	SUG; 8	SUZ; 13	FUJ; Ret	AUT; 10	MOT; 11	15th	4
2014	Epson Nakajima Racing	Honda NSX-GT	GT500	OKA; 15	FUJ; Ret	AUT; 10	SUG; 13	FUJ; 3	SUZ; 12	BUR; Ret	MOT; 14	17th	12
2015	Epson Nakajima Racing	Honda NSX-GT	GT500	OKA; Ret	FUJ; 12	CHA; 11	FUJ; 11	SUZ; 9	SUG; Ret	AUT; 10	MOT; 13	15th	4
2016	Epson Nakajima Racing	Honda NSX-GT	GT500	OKA; 14	FUJ; 10	SUG; 12	FUJ; 11	SUZ; 11	CHA; 5	MOT; 13	MOT; 14	18th	7
2017	Team Mugen	Honda NSX-GT	GT500	OKA; 9	FUJ; 15	AUT; 11	SUG; 6	FUJ; Ret	SUZ; 12	CHA; 13	MOT; 11	18th	7
2018	Team Mugen	Honda NSX-GT	GT500	OKA; 10	FUJ; 14	SUZ; Ret	CHA; 5	FUJ; 14	SUG; 4	AUT; 14	MOT; 14	15th	16
2019	Team Mugen	Honda NSX-GT	GT500	OKA; 7‡	FUJ; 11	SUZ; 12	CHA; Ret	FUJ; 6	AUT; 14	SUG; 9	MOT; 9	15th	12

^{‡} Half points awarded as less than 75% of race distance was completed.
