= Koki Saga =

Japanese racing driver (born 1983)

- Nationality: (Japan) Japanese
- Born: 25 April 1983 (age 43) Toyota, Aichi, Japan

Super GT career
- Debut season: 2006
- Current team: apr
- Categorisation: FIA Silver
- Car number: 31
- Former teams: Toyota Team Cerumo, Toyota Team SARD
- Starts: 116
- Wins: 6
- Podiums: 18
- Poles: 6
- Fastest laps: 3
- Best finish: 2nd in 2016

Previous series
- 2005–2010 2011–2014: Japanese Formula 3 Championship; Super Formula Championship

Koki Saga (嵯峨 宏紀, Saga Kōki; born 25 April 1983) is a Japanese racing driver who currently competes in Super Taikyu for apr. Saga previously competed in Super GT between 2006 and 2023.

== Racing career ==
The son of Koei Saga, a senior official at Toyota Gazoo Racing, Saga began kart racing in 1999. In his early career, Saga raced single seaters, such as Formula Toyota and the Japanese Formula 3 Championship. He competed in the Macau Grand Prix in 2008 and 2009 and has competed in Super Taikyu. He competed in Super Formula for four years with no success.

Saga began competing in Super GT in 2006; due to his ties to Toyota, he has only driven Toyota or Lexus vehicles in his Super GT career. Saga first competed with Toyota Team Cerumo, contributing to the team's first pole position and victory; he was then called up as a third driver for Lexus Team SARD for the Suzuka 1000 km. Saga has been with apr since 2010.

Since the 2018 Super GT Series, Saga has been noted for his antics in pre-race driver introduction segments, consisting of elaborate comedic skits involving costumes, the team's race queens and sometimes other drivers, often performed in a deadpan style.

== Racing record ==
=== Complete Japanese Formula 3 results ===
(key) (Races in bold indicate pole position) (Races in italics indicate fastest lap)

Year	Team	Chassis	Engine	1	2	3	4	5	6	7	8	9	10	11	12	13	14	15	16	17	18	19	20	DC	Points
2005	Le Beausset Motorsports	Dallara F305	Toyota 3S-GE 2.0 I4	MOT1; 11	MOT2; 10	SUZ1; 12	SUZ2; 10	SUG1; Ret	SUG2; 11	FUJ1; 11	FUJ2; 13	OKA1; 14	OKA2; 12	SUZ1; 9	SUZ2; 8	MIN1; 10	MIN2; 6	FUJ1; 10	FUJ2; 9	MIN1; Ret	MIN2; 13	MOT1; 15	MOT2; 8	13th	20
2006	Autosport with Le Beausset	Dallara F306	Toyota 3S-GE 2.0 I4	FUJ1; 9	FUJ2; Ret	SUZ1; 14	SUZ2; Ret	MOT1; 9	MOT2; 10	OKA1; 9	OKA2; 10	SUZ1; 11	SUZ2; 9	AUT1; 11	AUT2; 9	FUJ1; 8	FUJ2; 10	SUG1; 10	SUG2; 8	MOT1; 7	MOT2; 2			11th	39
2007	DENSO Team Le Beausset	Dallara F306	Toyota 3S-GE 2.0 I4	FUJ1; 9	FUJ2; 10	SUZ1; 8	SUZ2; 10	MOT1; 11	MOT2; 10	OKA1; 9	OKA2; 9	SUZ1; 12	SUZ2; 10	AUT1; 10	AUT2; 10	AUT3; 8	FUJ1; 10	FUJ2; 10	SEN1; 7	SEN2; 9	SEN3; 8	MOT1; 8	MOT2; Ret	11th	32
2008	DENSO Team Le Beausset	Dallara F308	Toyota 1AZ-FE 2.0 I4	FUJ1; 6	FUJ2; 6	AUT1; 4	AUT2; 7	SUZ1; 4	SUZ2; 5	MOT1; 9	MOT2; 3	OKA1; 5	OKA2; 6	SUZ1; 8	SUZ2; Ret	MOT1; 7	MOT2; 9	FUJ1; 11	FUJ2; 9	SUG1; 9	SUG2; 4			7th	99
2009	DENSO Team Le Beausset	Dallara F308	Toyota 1AZ-FE 2.0 I4	FUJ1; 5	FUJ2; 5	OKA1; 11	OKA2; 14	SUZ1; Ret	SUZ2; 6	FUJ1; 4	FUJ2; 5	SUZ1; 4	SUZ2; 3	MOT1; 6	MOT2; 6	AUT1; 3	AUT2; 4	SUG1; 6	SUG2; 12					6th	30
2010	DENSO Team Le Beausset	Dallara F308	Toyota 1AZ-FE 2.0 I4	SUZ1; 2	**SUZ2**; 2	MOT1; 4	MOT2; 7	FUJ1; 5	FUJ2; 5	FUJ1; 5	FUJ2; 5	MOT1; 4	MOT2; 6	OKA1; 4	OKA2; 5	SUG1; 15	SUG2; 2	AUT1; 1	AUT2; 1					4th	68

=== Complete Super Formula results ===
Year	Team	1	2		3	4	5	6	7		DC	Points
2011	Tochigi Le Beausset Motorsports	SUZ; 12	AUT; Ret		FUJ; 14	MOT; 16	SUZ; C	SUG; 13	MOT1; 13	MOT2; Ret	NC	0
2012	Tochigi Le Beausset Motorsports	SUZ; 13	MOT; 14		AUT; Ret	FUJ; 14	MOT; Ret	SUG; 15	SUZ1; 16	SUZ2; 13	NC	0
2013	Tochigi Le Beausset Motorsports	SUZ; 17	AUT; 11		FUJ; Ret	MOT; 16	INJ; C	SUG; 9	SUZ1; 14	SUZ2; 14	NC	0
2014	Tochigi Le Beausset Motorsports	SUZ; Ret	FUJ1; 11	FUJ2; 13	FUJ; Ret	MOT; 17	AUT; 11	SUG; Ret	SUZ1; Ret	SUZ2; 19	NC	0

=== Complete Macau Grand Prix results ===
Year	Team	Car	Qualifying	Quali Race	Main race
2008	(Japan) Le Beausset Motorsports	Dallara F308	DNQ	13th	Ret
2009	(Japan) Le Beausset Motorsports	Dallara F309	24th	18th	14th

=== Complete Super GT results ===
(key) (Races in bold indicate pole position) (Races in italics indicate fastest lap)

Year	Team	Car	Class	1	2	3	4	5	6	7	8	9	DC	Points
2006	Toyota Team Cerumo	Toyota Celica	GT300	SUZ; 11	OKA; 12	FUJ; 12	SEP	SUG; 11	SUZ; 1	MOT; Ret	AUT; 13	FUJ; 21	13th	31
2008	Toyota Team SARD	Lexus SC 430 GT500	GT500	SUZ	OKA	FUJ	SEP	SUG	SUZ; 15	MOT	AUT	FUJ	NC	0
2010	apr	Toyota Corolla Axio apr GT	GT300	SUZ; Ret	OKA; 5	FUJ; 9	SEP; 8	SUG; 3	SUZ; Ret	FUJ; C	MOT; 19		10th	22
2011	apr	Toyota Corolla Axio apr GT	GT300	OKA; 12	FUJ; 4	SEP; 11	SUG; Ret	SUZ; 13	FUJ; 13	AUT; 7	MOT; 11		16th	12
2012	apr	Toyota Prius apr GT	GT300	OKA; Ret	FUJ; 6	SEP; Ret	SUG; 8	SUZ; Ret	**FUJ**; 2	AUT; 8	MOT; Ret		10th	26
2013	apr	Toyota Prius apr GT	GT300	OKA; Ret	FUJ; 1	SEP; Ret	SUG; 22	SUZ; 15	FUJ; 2	FUJ	AUT; 15	MOT; 20	8th	35
2014	apr	Toyota Prius apr GT	GT300	**OKA**; Ret	FUJ; 6	AUT; Ret	SUG; Ret	FUJ; 6	SUZ; 2	CHA; 17	MOT; 2		8th	43
2015	apr	Toyota Prius apr GT	GT300	OKA; 1	**FUJ**; 4	CHA; 9	FUJ; 9	SUZ; 10	SUG; 2	AUT; 13	MOT; 1		**3rd**	**69**
2016	apr	Toyota Prius apr GT	GT300	OKA; 12	FUJ; 20	SUG; 1	FUJ; 25	SUZ; 2	CHA; 5	MOT; 24	**MOT**; 2		**2nd**	**60**
2017	apr	Toyota Prius apr GT	GT300	OKA; 10	FUJ; 12	AUT; Ret	SUG; 6	FUJ; 3	SUZ; Ret	CHA; 11	MOT; 12		15th	17
2018	apr	Toyota Prius apr GT	GT300	OKA; Ret	FUJ; 2	SUZ; 9	CHA; 2	FUJ; 3	SUG; 25	AUT; 10	MOT; 2		**3rd**	**61**
2019	apr	Toyota GR Sport Prius PHV apr GT	GT300	OKA; 12	FUJ; 19	SUZ; 11	CHA; 18	FUJ; 18	AUT; 14	SUG; 23	MOT; 20		NC	0
2020	apr	Toyota GR Sport Prius PHV apr GT	GT300	FUJ; 27	FUJ; 14	**SUZ**; 7	MOT; 15	FUJ; 5	SUZ; 18	MOT; 27	FUJ; 10		18th	12
2021	apr	Toyota GR Sport Prius PHV apr GT	GT300	OKA; 19	FUJ; 28	SUZ; 24	MOT; 18	SUG; 13	**AUT**; 1	MOT; 22	FUJ; 14		13th	21
2022	apr	Toyota GR Sport Prius PHV apr GT	GT300	OKA; 22	FUJ; 22	SUZ; 23	FUJ; 11	SUZ; 26	SUG; 17	AUT; 15	MOT; Ret		NC	0
2023	apr	Lexus LC 500h GT	GT300	OKA; 16	FUJ; 8	SUZ; 13	FUJ; 5	SUZ; 6	SUG; 11	AUT; 3	MOT		13th	25

* Season still in progress.
