= Koudai Tsukakoshi =

Japanese racing driver

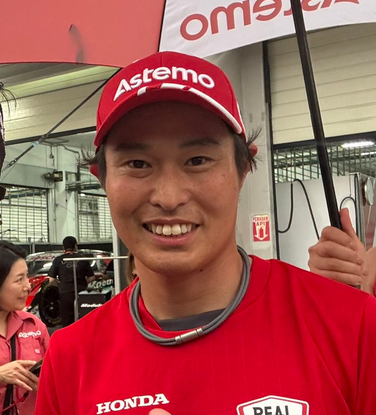
- Tsukakoshi at the 2025 Super GT Malaysia Festival
- Nationality: (Japan) Japanese
- Born: 20 November 1986 (age 39) Imaichi (now Nikkō), Tochigi, Japan

Super GT career
- Debut season: 2008
- Current team: Real Racing
- Car number: 17
- Starts: 145
- Wins: 7
- Podiums: 36
- Poles: 8
- Fastest laps: 7
- Best finish: 2nd in 2013, 2026

Previous series
- 2013–21 2009–2012 2008 2005–07 2004: Super Formula; Formula Nippon; Formula 3 Euro Series; All-Japan Formula Three; Formula Dream

Championship titles
- 2004: JAF Formula 4 West Series

Koudai Tsukakoshi (塚越広大, Tsukakoshi Kōdai; born 20 November 1986) is a Japanese racing driver for Honda Racing Corporation who competes in Super GT for Astemo Real Racing, and has competed in the series since 2008.

== Career ==
=== Formula Three ===
After competing in Formula Dream in 2004 and 2005, winning the championship in his second year, Tsukakoshi moved into the All-Japan Formula Three Championship for the final three rounds of the 2005 season, finishing fourteenth in the standings competing for M-TEC. He remained with the team for the 2006 season, finishing fifth in the standings, taking a victory at Suzuka. Another fifth place championship finish followed in 2007, as Tsukakoshi took two wins for Honda Team Real at Okayama and Suzuka. He also finished in second place at the prestigious Macau Grand Prix for Manor Motorsport, finishing behind Oliver Jarvis. Tsukakoshi moved to Manor Motorsport and the Formula Three Euroseries for the 2008 season. He finished seventh in the championship standings, with a best result of second place on four occasions.

=== Super Formula ===
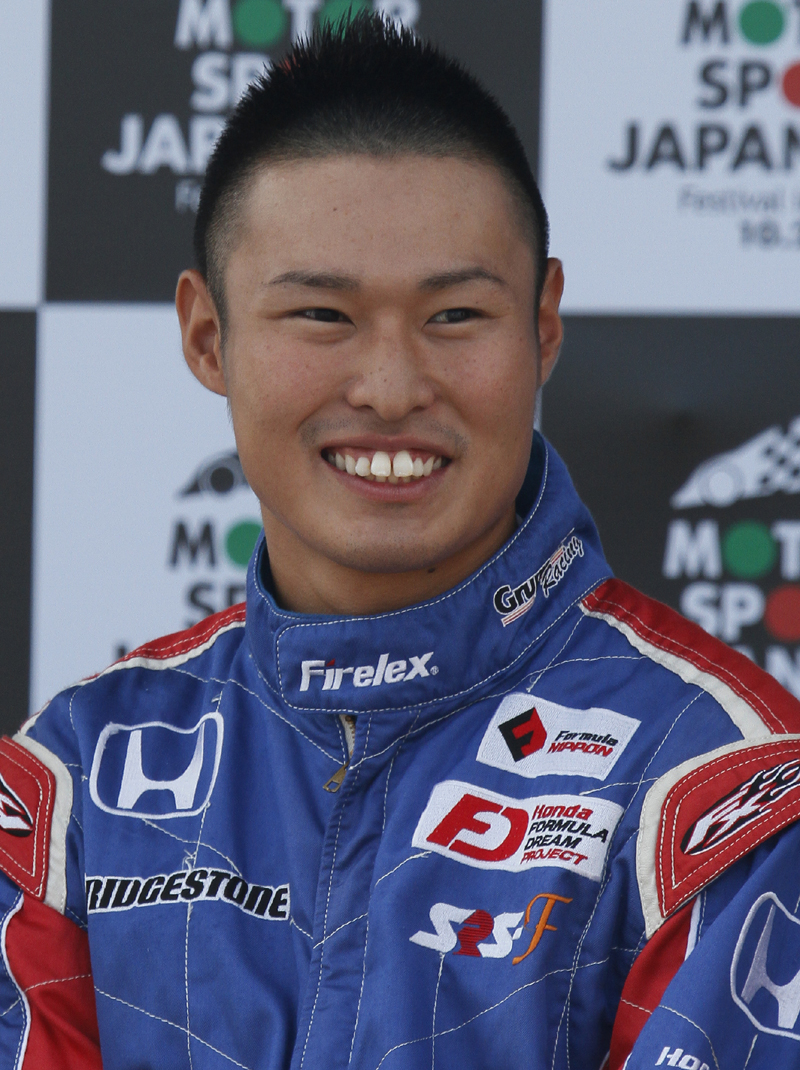
Tsukakoshi in 2010

After a season in Europe, Tsukakoshi made his debut in Formula Nippon in 2009 with HFDP Racing, which was run by Real Racing. He raced with them before moving to Dandelion Racing in 2011. In 2012, he came close to winning the title, losing out to Kazuki Nakajima by three points. In 2013, he returned to Real Racing, and he raced with them for six seasons. Tsukakoshi initially was not scheduled to compete in the 2019 season, but he replaced Tristan Charpentier from the second round of the season onwards. Real Racing announced it had withdrawn from the 2020 season, thus leaving Tsukakoshi without a seat. That season, he was hired by Drago Corse to replace Tatiana Calderon, who was unable to race due to COVID-19 travel restrictions, for the Okayama and Sugo rounds that year. He made a further three starts for the team in 2021, again replacing Calderon, which were his final outings as a driver.

Tsukakoshi was later recruited by the series to develop the new Dallara SF23 chassis as the test driver of Honda's development car. He also became part of a new ThreeBond Racing (formerly Drago Corse) structure as an advisor, and later took on the role of team director.

=== Super GT ===
Tsukakoshi made his debut with Honda GT500 team Real Racing in the 2008 Suzuka 1000km. He has driven for the team full-time since 2009, and finished runner-up in the 2013 standings alongside Toshihiro Kaneishi. Tsukakoshi just completed the 2026 season with Team Astemo Real, winning round 6 at Sugo and finished the season in second place overall for the series championship in the GT500 class.

== Racing record ==
=== Career summary ===
Season	Series	Team	Races	Wins	Poles	F/Laps	Podiums	Points	Position
2005	Japanese Formula 3 Championship	Honda Team M-TEC	5	0	0	0	0	19	14th
2006	Japanese Formula 3 Championship	Honda Team M-TEC	18	1	5	2	6	153	5th
2007	Japanese Formula 3 Championship	Honda Team Real	20	2	2	1	7	182	5th
2008	Formula 3 Euro Series	Manor Motorsport	20	0	0	0	4	36	7th
2008	Super GT - GT500	Real Racing	1	0	0	0	0	0	NC
2009	Super GT - GT500	Real Racing	9	0	0	0	2	51	5th
2009	Formula Nippon	HFDP Racing	8	0	0	1	0	20	7th
2010	Super GT - GT500	Real Racing	8	1	1	1	2	53	**3rd**
2010	Formula Nippon	HFDP Racing	8	0	0	0	1	9	9th
2011	Super GT - GT500	Real Racing	8	0	1	1	3	50	4th
2011	Formula Nippon	Docomo Team Dandelion Racing	7	0	1	0	2	26.5	4th
2012	Super GT - GT500	Real Racing	8	0	0	1	1	30	12th
2012	Formula Nippon	Docomo Team Dandelion Racing	8	1	1	0	6	43	**2nd**
2013	Super GT - GT500	Real Racing	8	0	0	0	4	64	**2nd**
2013	Super Formula	HP Real Racing	7	0	0	0	0	3	15th
2014	Super GT - GT500	Real Racing	8	0	1	0	1	24	12th
2014	Super Formula	HP Real Racing	9	0	0	0	0	8.5	11th
2015	Super GT - GT500	Real Racing	8	0	0	0	2	30	8th
2015	Super Formula	Real Racing	8	0	0	0	0	0	17th
2016	Super GT - GT500	Keihin Real Racing	8	0	0	1	1	27	11th
2016	Super Formula	Real Racing	9	0	0	0	0	11	11th
2017	Super GT - GT500	Keihin Real Racing	8	0	0	0	2	37	10th
2017	Super Formula	Real Racing	7	0	0	0	0	3	15th
2018	Super GT - GT500	Keihin Real Racing	8	1	1	1	2	45	7th
2018	Super Formula	Real Racing	7	0	0	0	0	6	13th
2019	Super GT - GT500	Keihin Real Racing	8	0	2	2	1	39	6th
2019	Super Formula	Real Racing	6	0	0	0	0	2	19th
2020	Super GT - GT500	Keihin Real Racing	8	2	0	0	2	59	**3rd**
2020	Super Formula	Drago Corse with ThreeBond	2	0	0	0	0	0	24th
2021	Super GT - GT500	Astemo Real Racing	8	1	0	0	2	52	6th
2021	Super Formula	Drago Corse with ThreeBond	3	0	0	0	0	0	22nd
2022	Super GT - GT500	Astemo Real Racing	8	1	0	0	3	60	4th
2023	Super GT - GT500	Astemo Real Racing	8	0	0	0	1	45	6th
2024	Super GT - GT500	Astemo Real Racing	8	0	1	0	2	43	10th
2025	Super GT - GT500	Astemo Real Racing	8	0	0	0	1	26	11th
2026	Super GT - GT500	Astemo Real Racing	8	1	1	0	2	65	**2nd**

=== Complete Japanese Formula 3 results ===
(key) (Races in bold indicate pole position) (Races in italics indicate fastest lap)

Year	Team	Engine	1	2	3	4	5	6	7	8	9	10	11	12	13	14	15	16	17	18	19	20	DC	Pts
2005	Honda Team M-TEC	Mugen	MOT; 1	MOT; 2	SUZ; 1	SUZ; 2	SUG; 1	SUG; 2	FUJ; 1	FUJ; 2	OKA; 1	OKA; 2	SUZ; 1	SUZ; 2	MIN; 1	MIN; 2	FUJ; 1; 11	FUJ; 2; 7	MIN; 1; 7	MIN; 2; 8	MOT; 1; 12	MOT; 2; 5	14th	19
2006	Honda Team M-TEC	Mugen	FUJ; 1; 2	FUJ; 2; 5	SUZ; 1; 12	SUZ; 2; 9	**MOT**; **1**; 7	MOT; 2; 3	**OKA**; **1**; 2	OKA; 2; 4	**SUZ**; **1**; 1	**SUZ**; **2**; 2	AUT; 1; 7	AUT; 2; 4	**FUJ**; **1**; 13	FUJ; 2; 11	SUG; 1; 5	SUG; 2; 5	MOT; 1; 2	MOT; 2; 11			5th	153
2007	Honda Team Real	Mugen	FUJ; 1; 7	FUJ; 2; 5	SUZ; 1; 5	SUZ; 2; 6	**MOT**; **1**; 3	MOT; 2; 4	OKA; 1; 3	OKA; 2; 1	SUZ; 1; 3	**SUZ**; **2**; 1	AUT; 1; 5	AUT; 2; 5	AUT; 3 Ret	FUJ; 1; 2	FUJ; 2; 2	SEN; 1; 6	SEN; 2; 8	SEN; 3; 4	MOT; 1; 5	MOT; 2; 8	5th	182

=== Complete Super GT results ===
(key) (Races in bold indicate pole position) (Races in italics indicate fastest lap)

Year	Team	Car	Class	1	2	3	4	5	6	7	8	9	DC	Points
2008	Real Racing	Honda NSX	GT500	SUZ	OKA	FUJ	SEP	SUG	SUZ; Ret	MOT	AUT	FUJ	25th	1
2009	Real Racing	Honda NSX	GT500	OKA; 5	SUZ; 6	FUJ; 12	SEP; 2	SUG; 6	SUZ; 10	FUJ; 4	AUT; Ret	MOT; 3	5th	51
2010	Real Racing	Honda HSV-010 GT	GT500	SUZ; 7	OKA; 7	FUJ; 5	SEP; 12	**SUG**; 1	SUZ; 4	FUJ; C	MOT; 3		3rd	53
2011	Real Racing	Honda HSV-010 GT	GT500	**OKA**; 3	FUJ; 8	SEP; 3	SUG; 6	SUZ; 12	FUJ; 3	AUT; 6	MOT; 7		4th	50
2012	Real Racing	Honda HSV-010 GT	GT500	OKA; 3	FUJ; 6	SEP; 7	SUG; 9	SUZ; 10	FUJ; 5	AUT; 14	MOT; Ret		12th	30
2013	Real Racing	Honda HSV-010 GT	GT500	OKA; 2	FUJ; Ret	SEP; 5	SUG; Ret	SUZ; 7	FUJ; 2	AUT; 3	MOT; 2		2nd	67
2014	Real Racing	Honda NSX Concept-GT	GT500	OKA; 6	FUJ; Ret	AUT; Ret	SUG; 3	**FUJ**; 4	SUZ; Ret	BUR; 12	MOT; 15		12th	24
2015	Real Racing	Honda NSX Concept-GT	GT500	OKA; 12	FUJ; 4	CHA; 3	FUJ; 8	SUZ; Ret	SUG; 8	AUT; 3	MOT; 8		8th	39
2016	Keihin Real Racing	Honda NSX Concept-GT	GT500	OKA; 11	FUJ; 12	SUG; 6	FUJ; 2	SUZ; 10	CHA; 6	MOT; Ret	MOT; 11		11th	27
2017	Keihin Real Racing	Honda NSX Concept-GT	GT500	OKA; 11	FUJ; 8	AUT; 2	SUG; Ret	FUJ; Ret	SUZ; 15	CHA; 3	MOT; 4		10th	37
2018	Keihin Real Racing	Honda NSX-GT	GT500	**OKA**; 1	FUJ; 11	SUZ; 11	CHA; 7	FUJ; 3	SUG; 9	AUT; 6	MOT; 15		7th	45
2019	Keihin Real Racing	Honda NSX-GT	GT500	OKA; 14	FUJ; 5	SUZ; Ret	CHA; 13	FUJ; 8	**AUT**; 2	**SUG**; 5	MOT; 5		6th	39
2020	Keihin Real Racing	Honda NSX-GT	GT500	FUJ; Ret	FUJ; 1	SUZ; 8	MOT; 1	FUJ; 10	SUZ; 10	MOT; 5	FUJ; 4		3rd	59
2021	Astemo Real Racing	Honda NSX-GT	GT500	OKA; 5	FUJ; 1	SUZ; 14	MOT; 7	SUG; 3	AUT; 8	MOT; 4	FUJ; Ret		6th	52
2022	Astemo Real Racing	Honda NSX-GT	GT500	OKA; 9	FUJ; 9	SUZ; 2	FUJ; 10	SUZ; 2	SUG; 12	AUT; 1	MOT; 5		4th	60
2023	Astemo Real Racing	Honda NSX-GT	GT500	OKA; 7	FUJ; 3	SUZ; 9	FUJ; 7	SUZ; 4	SUG; DSQ	AUT; 6	MOT; 3		6th	45
2024	Astemo Real Racing	Honda Civic Type R-GT	GT500	OKA; Ret	**FUJ**; 3^{1}	SUZ; 6	FUJ; 8	SUZ; 7	SUG; Ret	AUT; 14†	MOT; 2^{2}		10th	43
2025	Astemo Real Racing	Honda Civic Type R-GT	GT500	OKA; 8	FUJ; 12	SEP; 4	FS1 (9)	FS2; 13	SUZ; Ret	SUG; 3	AUT; 8	MOT; 13	11th	26
2026	Astemo Real Racing	Honda Prelude-GT	GT500	OKA; 10	FUJ; 9	FUJ; 5	**SUZ**; 2	SUG; 1	AUT; 14	MOT; 6	MOT; 2		2nd	65

^{‡} Half points awarded as less than 75% of race distance was completed.
^{(Number)} Driver did not take part in this sprint race, points are still awarded for the teammate's result.
^{*} Season still in progress.

=== Complete Formula Nippon/Super Formula results ===
(key) (Races in bold indicate pole position) (Races in italics indicate fastest lap)

Year	Honda	Engine	1	2	3	4	5	6	7	8	9	DC	Points
2009	HFDP Racing	Honda	FUJ; 6	SUZ; 5	MOT; 4	FUJ; 6	SUZ; 9	MOT; 10	AUT; Ret	SUG; 4		7th	20
2010	HFDP Racing	Honda	SUZ; 8	MOT; 2	FUJ; 11	MOT; 10	SUG; Ret	AUT; Ret	SUZ; 10	SUZ; 12		9th	9
2011	Docomo Team Dandelion Racing	Honda	SUZ; 7	**AUT**; 3	FUJ; 5	MOT; 4	SUZ; C	SUG; 4	MOT; 3	MOT; 8		4th	26.5
2012	Docomo Team Dandelion Racing	Honda	SUZ; 2	MOT; 5	**AUT**; 1	FUJ; 9	MOT; 3	SUG; 2	SUZ; 3	SUZ; 3		2nd	43
2013	HP Real Racing	Honda	SUZ; 9	AUT; 6	FUJ; 9	MOT; 9	SUG; Ret	SUZ; Ret	SUZ; Ret			15th	3
2014	HP Real Racing	Honda	SUZ; 14	FUJ; DNS	FUJ; 9	FUJ; Ret	MOT; 6	AUT; 4	SUG; Ret	SUZ; 8	SUZ; 13	11th	8.5
2015	Real Racing	Honda	SUZ; DNS	OKA; 14	FUJ; 13	MOT; Ret	AUT; 17	SUG; 9	SUZ; 9	SUZ; 11		17th	0
2016	Real Racing	Honda	SUZ; 5	OKA; 2	FUJ; 8	MOT; 12	OKA; 5	OKA; 11	SUG; 11	SUZ; 11	SUZ; 12	11th	11
2017	Real Racing	Honda	SUZ; 6	OKA; 11	OKA; 16	FUJ; 9	MOT; 9	AUT; 9	SUG; 16	SUZ; C	SUZ; C	15th	3
2018	Real Racing	Honda	SUZ; 6	AUT; C	SUG; 12	FUJ; 13	MOT; 10	OKA; 12	SUZ; 6			13th	6
2019	Real Racing	Honda	SUZ	AUT; 15	SUG; 9	FUJ; 18	MOT; 18	OKA; 14	SUZ; 7			19th	2
2020	Drago Corse with ThreeBond	Honda	MOT	OKA; 12	SUG; Ret	AUT	SUZ	SUZ	FUJ			24th	0
2021	Drago Corse with ThreeBond	Honda	FUJ	SUZ	AUT; 13	SUG; 16	MOT; Ret	MOT	SUZ			22nd	0
