= Yuhki Nakayama =

Japanese racing driver

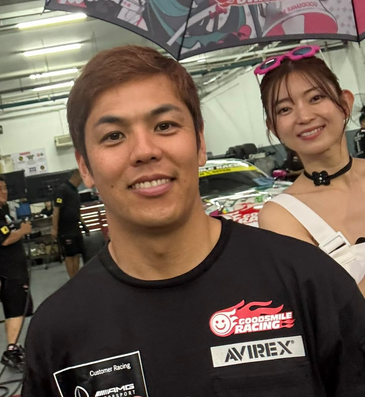
- Nakayama at the 2025 Super GT Malaysia Festival
- Nationality: Japanese
- Born: July 29, 1987 (age 39) Kanazawa, Ishikawa

Super GT GT300 career
- Debut season: 2013
- Categorisation: FIA Gold
- Car number: 31
- Former teams: Team Mugen, Team Up Garage with Bandoh, apr
- Starts: 39
- Wins: 3
- Poles: 2
- Fastest laps: 2
- Best finish: 1st in 2013

Previous series
- 2007-2008: All-Japan Formula Three

Yuhki Nakayama (中山友貴, Nakayama Yūki; born July 29, 1987 in Kanazawa) is a Japanese racing driver. As of 2025, he drives in the Super GT series in the GT300 category for Good Smile Racing. He was the Super GT champion in the GT300 in 2013.

== Racing record ==
=== Complete Super GT results ===
Year	Team	Car	Class	1	2	3	4	5	6	7	8	9	DC	Pts
2009	Nakajima Racing	Honda NSX	GT500	OKA; 7	SUZ; 9	FUJ; 8	SEP; 11	SUG; 11	SUZ; Ret	FUJ; 9	AUT; 9	MOT; 6	16th	18
2010	Nakajima Racing	Honda HSV-010 GT	GT500	SUZ; 10	OKA; 11	FUJ; 9	SEP; Ret	SUG; 11	SUZ; 7	FUJ; C	MOT; 9		14th	9
2011	Nakajima Racing	Honda HSV-010 GT	GT500	OKA; 10	FUJ; 15	SEP; 12	SUG; 3	SUZ; 13	FUJ; 12	AUT; 8	MOT; 5		12th	21
2012	Nakajima Racing	Honda HSV-010 GT	GT500	OKA; Ret	FUJ; 11	SEP; 11	SUG; 11	SUZ; Ret	FUJ; 14	AUT; 2	MOT; 3		14th	26
2013	Team Mugen	Honda CR-Z	GT300	OKA; 7	FUJ; 2	SEP; 2	SUG; 2	SUZ; 5	FUJ; 8	FUJ; 1	AUT; 9	MOT; 2	1st	85
2014	Team Mugen	Honda CR-Z	GT300	OKA; 9	FUJ; 3	AUT; 5	SUG; 11	FUJ; 18	SUZ; 8	BUR; 9	MOT; 13		10th	26
2015	Team Up Garage with Bandoh	Toyota 86	GT300	OKA; 19	FUJ; Ret	CHA; Ret	FUJ; Ret	SUZ; 21	SUG; 15	AUT; 9	MOT; Ret		25th	2
2016	Team Up Garage with Bandoh	Toyota 86	GT300	OKA; 15	FUJ; 4	SUG; 8	FUJ; 10	SUZ; 4	CHA; 22	MOT; 12	MOT; 9		14th	25
2017	Team Up Garage with Bandoh	Toyota 86	GT300	OKA; 12	FUJ; 9	AUT; Ret	SUG; 17	FUJ; 11	SUZ; 15	CHA; 7	MOT; 16		20th	6
2018	Team Up Garage with Bandoh	Toyota 86	GT300	OKA; 1	FUJ; 13	SUZ; 6	CHA; 18	FUJ; 9	SUG; 11	AUT; 27	MOT; Ret		19th	6
2019	apr	Toyota GR Sport Prius PHV apr GT	GT300	OKA; 12	FUJ; 19	SUZ; 11	CHA; 18	FUJ; 18	AUT; 14	SUG; 23	MOT; 20		NC	0
2020	apr	Toyota GR Sport Prius PHV apr GT	GT300	FUJ; 27	FUJ; 14	**SUZ**; 7	MOT; 15	FUJ; 5	SUZ; 18	MOT; 27	FUJ; 10		18th	12
2021	apr	Toyota GR Sport Prius PHV apr GT	GT300	OKA; 19	FUJ; 28	SUZ; 24	MOT; 18	SUG; 13	**AUT**; 1	MOT; 22	FUJ; 14		13th	21
2022	apr	Toyota GR Sport Prius PHV apr GT	GT300	OKA; 22	FUJ; 22	SUZ; 23	FUJ; 11	SUZ; 26	SUG; 17	AUT; 15	MOT; Ret		NC	0
2025	Goodsmile Racing & TeamUKYO	Mercedes-AMG GT3 Evo	GT300	OKA	FUJ	SEP; 3	FS1	FS2	SUZ	SUG	AUT	MOT	18th	16

* Season still in progress.

=== Complete Formula Nippon/Super Formula results ===
(key) (Races in bold indicate pole position) (Races in italics indicate fastest lap)

Year	Entrant	1	2	3	4	5	6	7	8	9	DC	Pts
2012	Real Racing	SUZ	MOT	AUT	FUJ; 14	MOT; 15	SUG	SUZ1	SUZ2		NC	0
2013	Real Racing	SUZ; 18	AUT; 8	FUJ; Ret	MOT; 11	SUG; Ret	SUZ1; 11	SUZ2; 12			17th	1
2014	Team Mugen	SUZ; 12	FUJ1; 12	FUJ2; 18	FUJ; 13	MOT; 12	AUT; 14	SUG; 14	SUZ1; Ret	SUZ2; 17	20th	0

* Season still in progress.
