= 2015 Super Formula Championship =

Seasons
- ← 2014 2016 →

The 2015 Japanese Championship Super Formula season was the forty-third season of premier Japanese open-wheel motor racing and the third under the name of Super Formula. The season began on 19 April and will end on 8 November after seven rounds.

The 2015 season was also the last season that Bridgestone, who had been the series' only tyre supplier since 1997, supplied tyres to all teams, as Yokohama took over the tyre contract for 2016.

== Teams and drivers ==
| Team | No. | Driver | Engine | Rounds |
|---|---|---|---|---|
| (Japan) Petronas Team TOM'S | 1 | (Japan) Kazuki Nakajima | Toyota RI4A | 1, 3–7 |
| (Japan) Petronas Team TOM'S | 1 | (Japan) Kazuya Oshima | Toyota RI4A | 2 |
| (Japan) Petronas Team TOM'S | 2 | (Germany) André Lotterer | Toyota RI4A | All |
| (Japan) Kondō Racing | 3 | (United Kingdom) James Rossiter | Toyota RI4A | All |
| (Japan) Kondō Racing | 4 | (United Kingdom) William Buller | Toyota RI4A | All |
| (Japan) Kygnus Sunoco Team LeMans | 7 | (Japan) Ryō Hirakawa | Toyota RI4A | All |
| (Japan) Kygnus Sunoco Team LeMans | 8 | (Japan) Kamui Kobayashi | Toyota RI4A | All |
| (Japan) Real Racing | 10 | (Japan) Koudai Tsukakoshi | Honda HR-414E | All |
| (Japan) Real Racing | 11 | (Japan) Takuya Izawa | Honda HR-414E | All |
| (Japan) Team Mugen | 16 | (Japan) Naoki Yamamoto | Honda HR-414E | All |
| (Hong Kong) KCMG | 18 | (Japan) Yuichi Nakayama | Toyota RI4A | All |
| (Japan) Lenovo Team Impul | 19 | (Brazil) João Paulo de Oliveira | Toyota RI4A | All |
| (Japan) Lenovo Team Impul | 20 | (Italy) Andrea Caldarelli | Toyota RI4A | All |
| (Japan) Drago Corse | 34 | (Japan) Takashi Kogure | Honda HR-414E | All |
| (Japan) P.mu/cerumo・INGING | 38 | (Japan) Hiroaki Ishiura | Toyota RI4A | All |
| (Japan) P.mu/cerumo・INGING | 39 | (Japan) Yuji Kunimoto | Toyota RI4A | All |
| (Japan) Docomo Team Dandelion Racing | 40 | (Japan) Tomoki Nojiri | Honda HR-414E | All |
| (Japan) Docomo Team Dandelion Racing | 41 | (India) Narain Karthikeyan | Honda HR-414E | All |
| (Japan) Nakajima Racing | 64 | (Japan) Daisuke Nakajima | Honda HR-414E | All |
| (Japan) Nakajima Racing | 65 | (Belgium) Bertrand Baguette | Honda HR-414E | All |

Team Mugen were scheduled to compete with two cars, and had announced the appointment of 2013 GP2 Champion Fabio Leimer for car number 15, but terminated the contract on 6 March prior to the season opener. No replacement driver was appointed, and the team competed with a single car.

== Race calendar and results ==
A provisional calendar for the 2015 season was released on 8 August 2014. All races are scheduled to be held in Japan. To avoid a clash with the 2015 FIA World Endurance Championship season, the date for the first round in Suzuka was rescheduled for 19 April, and to avoid a clash with the 2015 Formula One season, the SUGO race was also rescheduled to 18 October.

| Round | | Circuit | Date | Pole position | Fastest lap | Winning driver | Winning team |
|---|---|---|---|---|---|---|---|
| 1 | | Suzuka Circuit | 19 April | (Japan) Naoki Yamamoto | (Japan) Tomoki Nojiri | (Germany) André Lotterer | Petronas Team TOM'S |
| 2 | | Okayama International Circuit | 24 May | (Japan) Hiroaki Ishiura | (Japan) Hiroaki Ishiura | (Japan) Hiroaki Ishiura | P.mu/cerumo・INGING |
| 3 | | Fuji Speedway | 19 July | (Italy) Andrea Caldarelli | (Brazil) João Paulo de Oliveira | (Brazil) João Paulo de Oliveira | Lenovo Team Impul |
| 4 | | Twin Ring Motegi | 23 August | (Japan) Hiroaki Ishiura | (Japan) Kazuki Nakajima | (Japan) Hiroaki Ishiura | P.mu/cerumo・INGING |
| 5 | | Autopolis | 13 September | (Japan) Hiroaki Ishiura | (Brazil) João Paulo de Oliveira | (Japan) Kazuki Nakajima | Petronas Team TOM'S |
| 6 | | Sportsland SUGO | 18 October | (Germany) André Lotterer | (Japan) Tomoki Nojiri | (Germany) André Lotterer | Petronas Team TOM'S |
| 7 | R1 | Suzuka Circuit | 8 November | (Germany) André Lotterer | (Germany) André Lotterer | (Germany) André Lotterer | Petronas Team TOM'S |
| 7 | R2 | Suzuka Circuit | 8 November | (Japan) Naoki Yamamoto | (India) Narain Karthikeyan | (Japan) Naoki Yamamoto | Team Mugen |

== Championship standings ==
=== Drivers' Championship ===
Scoring system

| Round | 1st | 2nd | 3rd | 4th | 5th | 6th | 7th | 8th | Pole |
| 1–6 | 10 | 8 | 6 | 5 | 4 | 3 | 2 | 1 | 1 |
| 7 | 8 | 4 | 3 | 2.5 | 2 | 1.5 | 1 | 0.5 | 1 |

| Pos | Driver | SUZ | OKA | FUJ | MOT | AUT | SUG | SUZ | | Points |
|---|---|---|---|---|---|---|---|---|---|---|
| 1 | (Japan) Hiroaki Ishiura | 5 | **1** | 3 | **1** | **2** | 5 | 2 | 4 | 51.5 |
| 2 | (Japan) Kazuki Nakajima | 2 | | 2 | 2 | 1 | 4 | 4 | 2 | 45.5 |
| 3 | (Germany) André Lotterer | 1 | 8 | 5 | 4 | 11 | **1** | **1** | Ret | 40 |
| 4 | (Brazil) João Paulo de Oliveira | 4 | 5 | 1 | 3 | 5 | 7 | Ret | 3 | 34 |
| 5 | (Japan) Naoki Yamamoto | **15** | 4 | 12 | 8 | 7 | 2 | 14 | **1** | 26 |
| 6 | (Japan) Kamui Kobayashi | 9 | 2 | 10 | 17 | 3 | 6 | 3 | 9 | 20 |
| 7 | (Japan) Tomoki Nojiri | 8 | 3 | 8 | 6 | 10 | 3 | 5 | Ret | 19 |
| 8 | (Japan) Ryō Hirakawa | 12 | 9 | 6 | 7 | 4 | 8 | 10 | 5 | 13 |
| 9 | (Japan) Yuji Kunimoto | 17 | Ret | 4 | 18 | 8 | 17 | 7 | 8 | 7.5 |
| 10 | (Japan) Daisuke Nakajima | 6 | 12 | Ret | 5 | 9 | 12 | Ret | 10 | 7 |
| 11 | (India) Narain Karthikeyan | 3 | 10 | Ret | 9 | 14 | 13 | 12 | 14 | 6 |
| 12 | (United Kingdom) James Rossiter | 16 | Ret | 7 | 12 | 6 | 14 | Ret | Ret | 5 |
| 13 | (Japan) Takuya Izawa | 7 | 7 | 11 | 10 | 12 | Ret | 8 | 15 | 4.5 |
| 14 | (Italy) Andrea Caldarelli | 11 | 6 | **9** | 11 | 15 | 16 | Ret | 12 | 4 |
| 15 | (Japan) Takashi Kogure | Ret | Ret | 16 | 14 | 13 | 11 | 6 | 7 | 2.5 |
| 16 | (Japan) Yuichi Nakayama | 13 | Ret | 15 | 16 | 19 | 10 | Ret | 6 | 1.5 |
| 17 | (Japan) Koudai Tsukakoshi | DNS | 14 | 13 | Ret | 17 | 9 | 9 | 11 | 0 |
| 18 | (Belgium) Bertrand Baguette | 10 | 11 | Ret | 15 | 16 | 18 | 11 | Ret | 0 |
| 19 | (United Kingdom) William Buller | 14 | 13 | 14 | 13 | 18 | 15 | 13 | 13 | 0 |
| 20 | (Japan) Kazuya Oshima | | 15 | | | | | | | 0 |
| Pos | Driver | SUZ | OKA | FUJ | MOT | AUT | SUG | SUZ | | Points |

| Colour | Result |
|---|---|
| Gold | Winner |
| Silver | Second place |
| Bronze | Third place |
| Green | Points classification |
| Blue | Non-points classification |
| Blue | Non-classified finish (NC) |
| Purple | Retired, not classified (Ret) |
| Red | Did not qualify (DNQ) |
| Red | Did not pre-qualify (DNPQ) |
| Black | Disqualified (DSQ) |
| White | Did not start (DNS) |
| White | Withdrew (WD) |
| White | Race cancelled (C) |
| Blank | Did not practice (DNP) |
| Blank | Did not arrive (DNA) |
| Blank | Excluded (EX) |

**Bold** – Pole
Italics – Fastest Lap

=== Teams' Championship ===
| Pos | Team | No. | SUZ | OKA | FUJ | MOT | AUT | SUG | SUZ | | Points |
|---|---|---|---|---|---|---|---|---|---|---|---|
| 1 | Petronas Team TOM'S | 1 | 2 | 15 | 2 | 2 | 1 | 4 | 4 | 2 | 80.5 |
| 1 | Petronas Team TOM'S | 2 | 1 | 8 | 5 | 4 | 11 | **1** | **1** | Ret | 80.5 |
| 2 | P.mu/cerumo・INGING | 38 | 5 | **1** | 3 | **1** | **2** | 5 | 2 | 4 | 56 |
| 2 | P.mu/cerumo・INGING | 39 | 17 | Ret | 4 | 18 | 8 | 17 | 7 | 8 | 56 |
| 3 | Lenovo Team Impul | 19 | 4 | 5 | 1 | 3 | 5 | 7 | Ret | 3 | 37 |
| 3 | Lenovo Team Impul | 20 | 11 | 6 | **9** | 11 | 15 | 16 | Ret | 12 | 37 |
| 4 | Kygnus Sunoco Team LeMans | 7 | 12 | 9 | 6 | 7 | 4 | 8 | 10 | 5 | 33 |
| 4 | Kygnus Sunoco Team LeMans | 8 | 9 | 2 | 10 | 17 | 3 | 6 | 3 | 9 | 33 |
| 5 | Docomo Team Dandelion Racing | 40 | 8 | 3 | 8 | 6 | 10 | 3 | 5 | Ret | 25 |
| 5 | Docomo Team Dandelion Racing | 41 | 3 | 10 | Ret | 9 | 14 | 13 | 12 | 14 | 25 |
| 6 | Team Mugen | 16 | **15** | 4 | 12 | 8 | 7 | 2 | 14 | **1** | 21 |
| 7 | Nakajima Racing | 64 | 6 | 12 | Ret | 5 | 9 | 12 | Ret | 10 | 7 |
| 7 | Nakajima Racing | 65 | 10 | 11 | Ret | 15 | 16 | 18 | 11 | Ret | 7 |
| 8 | Kondō Racing | 3 | 16 | Ret | 7 | 12 | 6 | 14 | Ret | Ret | 5 |
| 8 | Kondō Racing | 4 | 14 | 13 | 14 | 13 | 18 | 15 | 13 | 13 | 5 |
| 9 | HP Real Racing | 10 | DNS | 14 | 13 | Ret | 17 | 9 | 9 | 11 | 4.5 |
| 9 | HP Real Racing | 11 | 7 | 7 | 11 | 10 | 12 | Ret | 8 | 15 | 4.5 |
| 10 | Drago Corse | 34 | Ret | Ret | 16 | 14 | 13 | 11 | 6 | 7 | 2.5 |
| 11 | KCMG | 18 | 13 | Ret | 15 | 16 | 19 | 10 | Ret | 6 | 1.5 |
| Pos | Team | No. | SUZ | OKA | FUJ | MOT | AUT | SUG | SUZ | | Points |

| Colour | Result |
|---|---|
| Gold | Winner |
| Silver | Second place |
| Bronze | Third place |
| Green | Points classification |
| Blue | Non-points classification |
| Blue | Non-classified finish (NC) |
| Purple | Retired, not classified (Ret) |
| Red | Did not qualify (DNQ) |
| Red | Did not pre-qualify (DNPQ) |
| Black | Disqualified (DSQ) |
| White | Did not start (DNS) |
| White | Withdrew (WD) |
| White | Race cancelled (C) |
| Blank | Did not practice (DNP) |
| Blank | Did not arrive (DNA) |
| Blank | Excluded (EX) |

**Bold** – Pole
Italics – Fastest Lap
