= 2015 Super GT Series =

Motorsport season

The 2015 Autobacs Super GT Series was the twenty-third season of the Japan Automobile Federation Super GT Championship including the All Japan Grand Touring Car Championship (JGTC) era, and the eleventh season under the name Super GT. It marked the thirty-third season overall of a Japanese professional sportscar championship dating back to the All Japan Sports Prototype Championship. The season began on April 5 and ended on November 15, after 8 races.

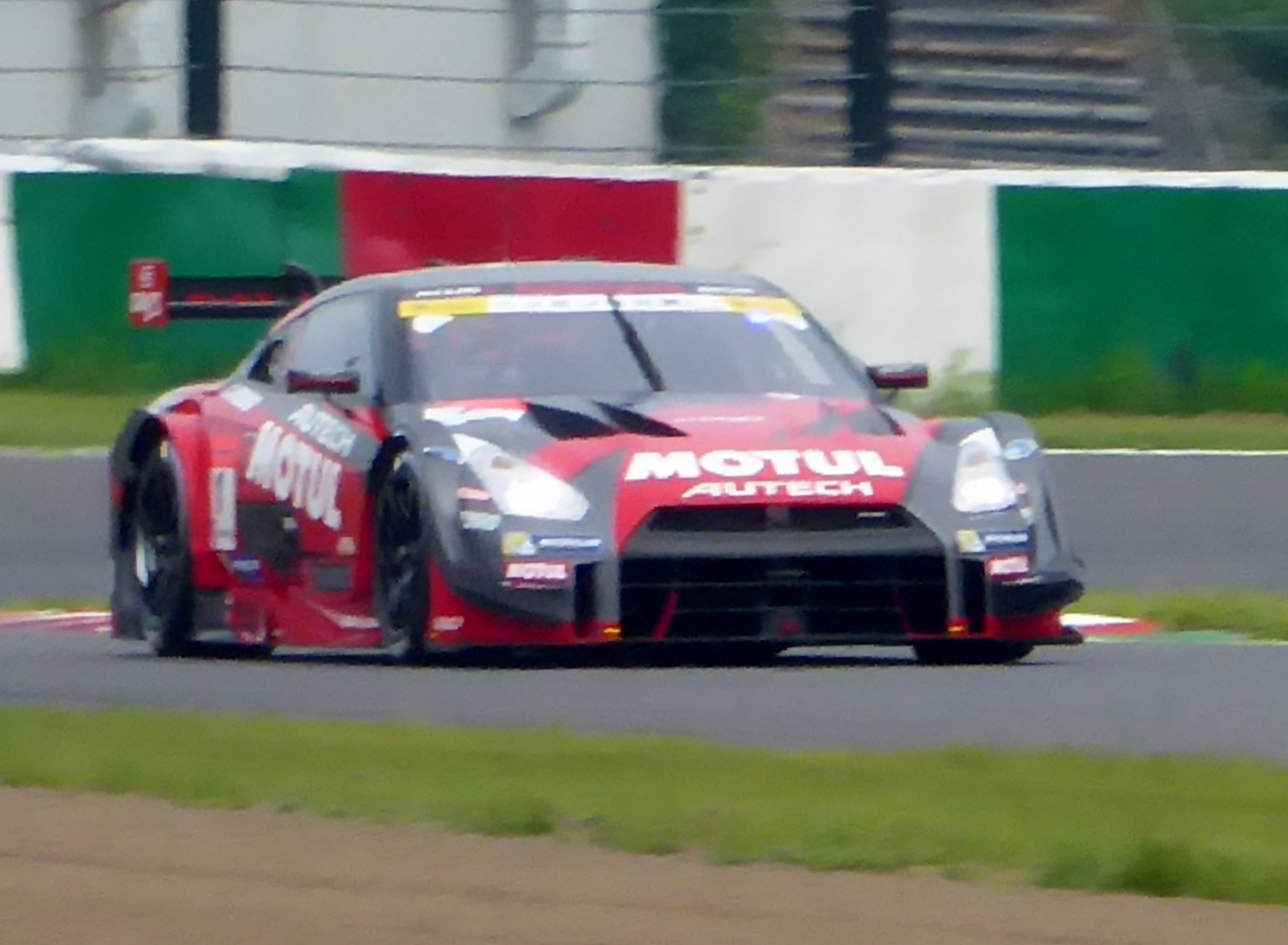
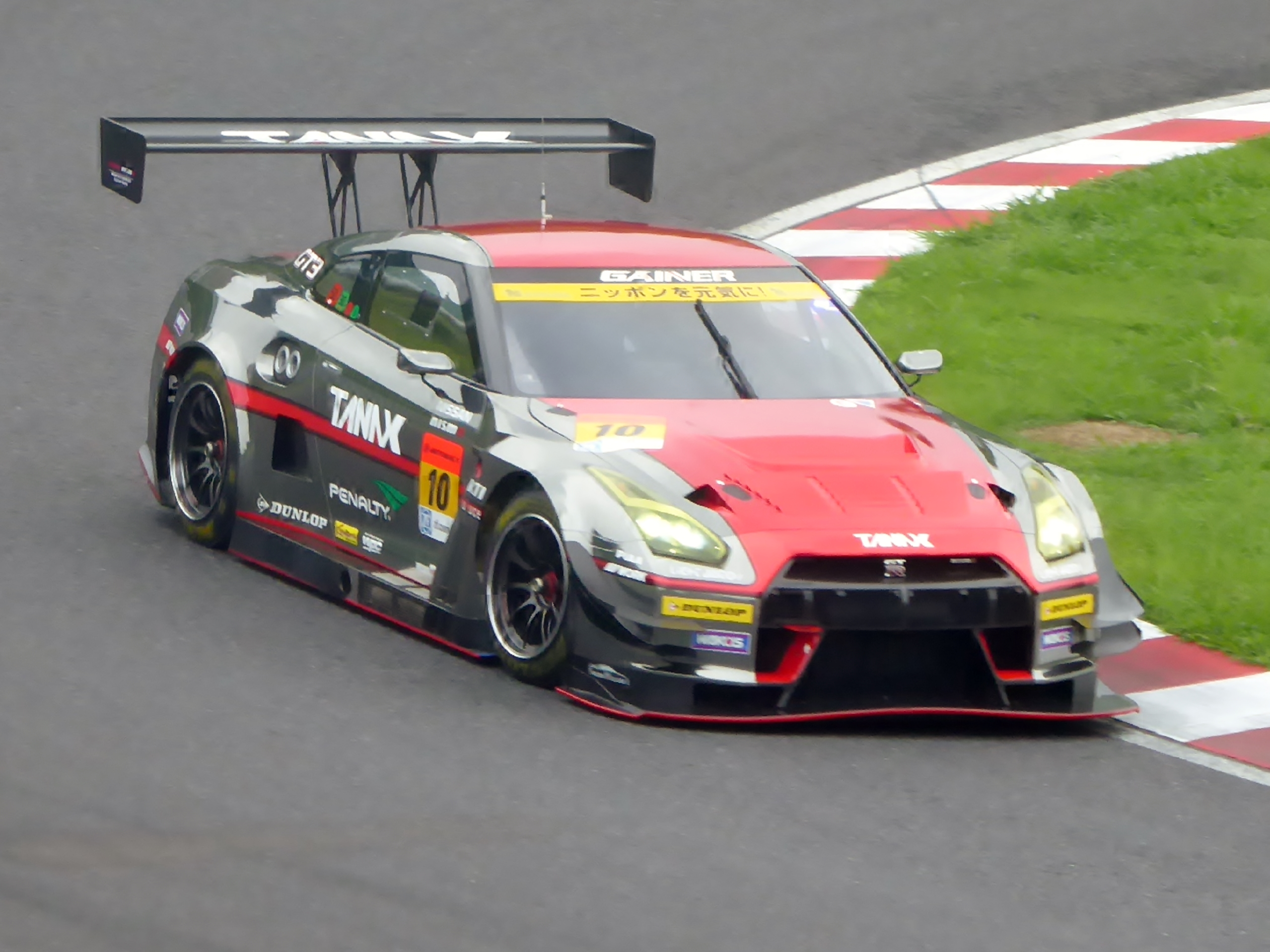
The No. 1 Nismo car won the GT500 Drivers' and Teams' Championship title. The No. 10 Gainer car won the GT300 Teams' championship title with its driver André Couto winning the GT300 Drivers' championship title.

== Schedule ==
A provisional calendar was released on August 8, 2014. An updated calendar was released on January 19, 2015, which saw the Autopolis race move from May to November, the Chang race move from October to June and SUGO from July to September.

Round	Race	Circuit	Date
1	Okayama GT; 300 km	(Japan) Okayama International Circuit	April 5
2	Fuji GT; 500 km	(Japan) Fuji Speedway	May 3
3	Buriram United Super GT Race; 300 km	(Thailand) Chang International Circuit	June 21
4	Fuji GT; 300 km	(Japan) Fuji Speedway	August 9
5	44th International Suzuka 1000km 1000 km	(Japan) Suzuka Circuit	August 30
6	Sugo GT; 300 km	(Japan) Sportsland SUGO	September 20
7	Autopolis GT; 300 km	(Japan) Autopolis	November 1
8	Motegi GT; 250 km	(Japan) Twin Ring Motegi	November 15

2015 Japanese venues	2015 International venue

== Drivers and teams ==
=== GT500 ===
Team	Make	Car	Engine	No.	Drivers	Tyre	Rounds
(Japan) Nismo	Nissan	Nissan GT-R NISMO GT500	Nissan NR20A 2.0 L Turbo I4	1	(Japan) Tsugio Matsuda	M	All
(Japan) Nismo	Nissan	Nissan GT-R NISMO GT500	Nissan NR20A 2.0 L Turbo I4	1	(Italy) Ronnie Quintarelli	M	All
(Japan) Lexus Team LeMans ENEOS	Lexus	Lexus RC F GT500	Lexus RI4AG 2.0 L Turbo I4	6	(Japan) Yuji Kunimoto	B	All
(Japan) Lexus Team LeMans ENEOS	Lexus	Lexus RC F GT500	Lexus RI4AG 2.0 L Turbo I4	6	(Japan) Kazuya Oshima	B	All
(Japan) Autobacs Racing Team Aguri	Honda	Honda NSX Concept-GT	Honda HR-414E 2.0 L Turbo I4	8	(Japan) Kosuke Matsuura	B	All
(Japan) Autobacs Racing Team Aguri	Honda	Honda NSX Concept-GT	Honda HR-414E 2.0 L Turbo I4	8	(Japan) Tomoki Nojiri	B	All
(Japan) Team Impul	Nissan	Nissan GT-R NISMO GT500	Nissan NR20A 2.0 L Turbo I4	12	(Brazil) João Paulo de Oliveira	B	All
(Japan) Team Impul	Nissan	Nissan GT-R NISMO GT500	Nissan NR20A 2.0 L Turbo I4	12	(Japan) Hironobu Yasuda	B	All
(Japan) Drago Modulo Honda Racing	Honda	Honda NSX Concept-GT	Honda HR-414E 2.0 L Turbo I4	15	(Japan) Takashi Kogure	B	All
(Japan) Drago Modulo Honda Racing	Honda	Honda NSX Concept-GT	Honda HR-414E 2.0 L Turbo I4	15	(United Kingdom) Oliver Turvey	B	All
(Japan) Keihin REAL Racing	Honda	Honda NSX Concept-GT	Honda HR-414E 2.0 L Turbo I4	17	(Japan) Hideki Mutoh	B	All
(Japan) Keihin REAL Racing	Honda	Honda NSX Concept-GT	Honda HR-414E 2.0 L Turbo I4	17	(Japan) Koudai Tsukakoshi	B	All
(Japan) Lexus Team WedsSport BANDOH	Lexus	Lexus RC F GT500	Lexus RI4AG 2.0 L Turbo I4	19	(Japan) Yuhi Sekiguchi	Y	All
(Japan) Lexus Team WedsSport BANDOH	Lexus	Lexus RC F GT500	Lexus RI4AG 2.0 L Turbo I4	19	(Japan) Juichi Wakisaka	Y	All
(Japan) Kondō Racing	Nissan	Nissan GT-R NISMO GT500	Nissan NR20A 2.0 L Turbo I4	24	(Japan) Daiki Sasaki	Y	All
(Japan) Kondō Racing	Nissan	Nissan GT-R NISMO GT500	Nissan NR20A 2.0 L Turbo I4	24	(Spain) Lucas Ordóñez	Y	1–3
(Japan) Kondō Racing	Nissan	Nissan GT-R NISMO GT500	Nissan NR20A 2.0 L Turbo I4	24	(Germany) Michael Krumm	Y	4–8
(Japan) Lexus Team Petronas TOM'S	Lexus	Lexus RC F GT500	Lexus RI4AG 2.0 L Turbo I4	36	(Japan) Daisuke Ito	B	All
(Japan) Lexus Team Petronas TOM'S	Lexus	Lexus RC F GT500	Lexus RI4AG 2.0 L Turbo I4	36	(United Kingdom) James Rossiter	B	All
(Japan) Lexus Team KeePer TOM'S	Lexus	Lexus RC F GT500	Lexus RI4AG 2.0 L Turbo I4	37	(Italy) Andrea Caldarelli	B	All
(Japan) Lexus Team KeePer TOM'S	Lexus	Lexus RC F GT500	Lexus RI4AG 2.0 L Turbo I4	37	(Japan) Ryo Hirakawa	B	All
(Japan) Lexus Team ZENT Cerumo	Lexus	Lexus RC F GT500	Lexus RI4AG 2.0 L Turbo I4	38	(Japan) Hiroaki Ishiura	B	All
(Japan) Lexus Team ZENT Cerumo	Lexus	Lexus RC F GT500	Lexus RI4AG 2.0 L Turbo I4	38	(Japan) Yuji Tachikawa	B	All
(Japan) Lexus Team SARD	Lexus	Lexus RC F GT500	Lexus RI4AG 2.0 L Turbo I4	39	(Japan) Kohei Hirate	B	All
(Japan) Lexus Team SARD	Lexus	Lexus RC F GT500	Lexus RI4AG 2.0 L Turbo I4	39	(Finland) Heikki Kovalainen	B	All
(Japan) Lexus Team SARD	Lexus	Lexus RC F GT500	Lexus RI4AG 2.0 L Turbo I4	39	(Austria) Christian Klien	B	5
(Japan) MOLA	Nissan	Nissan GT-R NISMO GT500	Nissan NR20A 2.0 L Turbo I4	46	(Japan) Satoshi Motoyama	M	All
(Japan) MOLA	Nissan	Nissan GT-R NISMO GT500	Nissan NR20A 2.0 L Turbo I4	46	(Japan) Masataka Yanagida	M	All
(Japan) Nakajima Racing	Honda	Honda NSX Concept-GT	Honda HR-414E 2.0 L Turbo I4	64	(Belgium) Bertrand Baguette	D	All
(Japan) Nakajima Racing	Honda	Honda NSX Concept-GT	Honda HR-414E 2.0 L Turbo I4	64	(Japan) Daisuke Nakajima	D	All
(Japan) Team Kunimitsu	Honda	Honda NSX Concept-GT	Honda HR-414E 2.0 L Turbo I4	100	(Japan) Takuya Izawa	B	All
(Japan) Team Kunimitsu	Honda	Honda NSX Concept-GT	Honda HR-414E 2.0 L Turbo I4	100	(Japan) Naoki Yamamoto	B	All

=== GT300 ===
Team	Make	Car	Engine	No.	Drivers	Tyre	Rounds
(Japan) Goodsmile Racing & Team Ukyo	Mercedes-Benz	Mercedes-Benz SLS AMG GT3	Mercedes-Benz M159 6.2 L V8	0	(Japan) Tatsuya Kataoka	Y	All
(Japan) Goodsmile Racing & Team Ukyo	Mercedes-Benz	Mercedes-Benz SLS AMG GT3	Mercedes-Benz M159 6.2 L V8	0	(Japan) Nobuteru Taniguchi	Y	All
(Japan) Cars Tokai Dream28	Lotus	Lotus Evora MC GT300	GTA V8 4.5 L V8	2	(Japan) Hiroki Katoh	Y	All
(Japan) Cars Tokai Dream28	Lotus	Lotus Evora MC GT300	GTA V8 4.5 L V8	2	(Japan) Kazuho Takahashi	Y	All
(Japan) Cars Tokai Dream28	Lotus	Lotus Evora MC GT300	GTA V8 4.5 L V8	2	(Japan) Hiroshi Hamaguchi	Y	5
(Japan) NDDP Racing	Nissan	Nissan GT-R GT3	Nissan VR38DETT 3.8 L Twin Turbo V6	3	(Japan) Kazuki Hoshino	Y	All
(Japan) NDDP Racing	Nissan	Nissan GT-R GT3	Nissan VR38DETT 3.8 L Twin Turbo V6	3	(Japan) Mitsunori Takaboshi	Y	All
(Japan) NDDP Racing	Nissan	Nissan GT-R GT3	Nissan VR38DETT 3.8 L Twin Turbo V6	3	(Belgium) Wolfgang Reip	Y	5
(Japan) Team Mach	Toyota	Toyota 86 MC GT300	GTA V8 4.5 L V8	5	(Japan) Shogo Mitsuyama	Y	1–2, 4–8
(Japan) Team Mach	Toyota	Toyota 86 MC GT300	GTA V8 4.5 L V8	5	(Japan) Tetsuji Tamanaka	Y	1–2, 4–8
(Japan) Team Mach	Toyota	Toyota 86 MC GT300	GTA V8 4.5 L V8	5	(Japan) Junichiro Yamashita	Y	2
(Japan) BMW Sports Trophy Team Studie	BMW	BMW Z4 GT3	BMW P65B44 4.4 L V8	7	(Japan) Seiji Ara	Y	All
(Japan) BMW Sports Trophy Team Studie	BMW	BMW Z4 GT3	BMW P65B44 4.4 L V8	7	(Germany) Jörg Müller	Y	All
(Japan) Pacific Racing Team	McLaren	McLaren MP4-12C GT3	McLaren M838T 3.8 L Twin Turbo V8	9	(Japan) Takuya Shirasaka	Y	1–2, 4–8
(Japan) Pacific Racing Team	McLaren	McLaren MP4-12C GT3	McLaren M838T 3.8 L Twin Turbo V8	9	(Japan) Tohjiro Azuma	Y	1–2
(Japan) Pacific Racing Team	McLaren	McLaren MP4-12C GT3	McLaren M838T 3.8 L Twin Turbo V8	9	(Japan) Daisuke Yamawaki	Y	2, 5
(Japan) Pacific Racing Team	McLaren	McLaren MP4-12C GT3	McLaren M838T 3.8 L Twin Turbo V8	9	(Japan) Ryohei Sakaguchi	Y	4–8
(Japan) GAINER	Nissan	Nissan GT-R GT3	Nissan VR38DETT 3.8 L Twin Turbo V6	10	(Macau) André Couto	D	All
(Japan) GAINER	Nissan	Nissan GT-R GT3	Nissan VR38DETT 3.8 L Twin Turbo V6	10	(Japan) Katsumasa Chiyo	D	1–2, 4–5, 7–8
(Japan) GAINER	Nissan	Nissan GT-R GT3	Nissan VR38DETT 3.8 L Twin Turbo V6	10	(Japan) Ryuichiro Tomita	D	2–3, 5–6
(Japan) GAINER	Mercedes-Benz	Mercedes-Benz SLS AMG GT3	Mercedes-Benz M159 6.2 L V8	11	(Japan) Katsuyuki Hiranaka	D	All
(Japan) GAINER	Mercedes-Benz	Mercedes-Benz SLS AMG GT3	Mercedes-Benz M159 6.2 L V8	11	(Sweden) Björn Wirdheim	D	All
(Japan) Team Up Garage with Bandoh	Toyota	Toyota 86 MC GT300	GTA V8 4.5 L V8	18; 20	(Japan) Yuhki Nakayama	Y	All
(Japan) Team Up Garage with Bandoh	Toyota	Toyota 86 MC GT300	GTA V8 4.5 L V8	18; 20	(Japan) Yuji Ide	Y	1–4, 7–8
(Japan) Team Up Garage with Bandoh	Toyota	Toyota 86 MC GT300	GTA V8 4.5 L V8	18; 20	(Estonia) Marko Asmer	Y	2, 5
(Japan) Team Up Garage with Bandoh	Toyota	Toyota 86 MC GT300	GTA V8 4.5 L V8	18; 20	(New Zealand) Nick Cassidy	Y	5
(Japan) Team Up Garage with Bandoh	Toyota	Toyota 86 MC GT300	GTA V8 4.5 L V8	18; 20	(Japan) Kota Sasaki	Y	6
(Japan) Audi Team Hitotsuyama	Audi	Audi R8 LMS ultra	Audi CJJ 5.2 L V10	21	(Japan) Tomonobu Fujii	Y	All
(Japan) Audi Team Hitotsuyama	Audi	Audi R8 LMS ultra	Audi CJJ 5.2 L V10	21	(United Kingdom) Richard Lyons	Y	All
(Japan) Audi Team Hitotsuyama	Audi	Audi R8 LMS ultra	Audi CJJ 5.2 L V10	21	(Monaco) Stéphane Ortelli	Y	2
(Japan) R'Qs Motor Sports	Mercedes-Benz	Mercedes-Benz SLS AMG GT3	Mercedes-Benz M159 6.2 L V8	22	(Japan) Masaki Jyonai	Y	1, 3–8
(Japan) R'Qs Motor Sports	Mercedes-Benz	Mercedes-Benz SLS AMG GT3	Mercedes-Benz M159 6.2 L V8	22	(Japan) Hisashi Wada	Y	1, 3–8
(Japan) VivaC team Tsuchiya	Toyota	Toyota 86 MC GT300	GTA V8 4.5 L V8	25	(Japan) Takeshi Tsuchiya	Y	All
(Japan) VivaC team Tsuchiya	Toyota	Toyota 86 MC GT300	GTA V8 4.5 L V8	25	(Japan) Takamitsu Matsui	Y	1–6
(Japan) VivaC team Tsuchiya	Toyota	Toyota 86 MC GT300	GTA V8 4.5 L V8	25	(Japan) Tatsuya Tanigawa	Y	5, 7–8
(Thailand) Reiter Vattana Motorsport	Lamborghini	Lamborghini Gallardo R-EX	Lamborghini CEH 5.2 L V10	28	(Thailand) Chonsawat Asavahame	M	3
(Thailand) Reiter Vattana Motorsport	Lamborghini	Lamborghini Gallardo R-EX	Lamborghini CEH 5.2 L V10	28	(Czech Republic) Tomáš Enge	M	3
(Japan) apr	Nissan	Nissan GT-R GT3	Nissan VR38DETT 3.8 L Twin Turbo V6	30	(Japan) Yuki Iwasaki	Y	All
(Japan) apr	Nissan	Nissan GT-R GT3	Nissan VR38DETT 3.8 L Twin Turbo V6	30	(Japan) Hiroshi Koizumi	Y	All
(Japan) apr	Nissan	Nissan GT-R GT3	Nissan VR38DETT 3.8 L Twin Turbo V6	30	(Japan) Masami Kageyama	Y	2
(Japan) apr	Toyota	Toyota Prius apr GT	Toyota RV8KLM 3.4 L Hybrid V8	31	(Japan) Yuichi Nakayama	B	All
(Japan) apr	Toyota	Toyota Prius apr GT	Toyota RV8KLM 3.4 L Hybrid V8	31	(Japan) Koki Saga	B	All
(Japan) apr	Toyota	Toyota Prius apr GT	Toyota RV8KLM 3.4 L Hybrid V8	31	(Japan) Kota Sasaki	B	2, 5
(Japan) Porsche Team KTR	Porsche	Porsche 911 GT3	Porsche M97/80 4.0 L F6	33	(Japan) Kenta Yamashita	Y	All
(Japan) Porsche Team KTR	Porsche	Porsche 911 GT3	Porsche M97/80 4.0 L F6	33	(Switzerland) Alexandre Imperatori	Y	1–4
(Japan) Porsche Team KTR	Porsche	Porsche 911 GT3	Porsche M97/80 4.0 L F6	33	(Japan) Yuya Sakamoto	Y	5–8
(Japan) Dijon Racing	Nissan	Nissan GT-R GT3	Nissan VR38DETT 3.8 L Twin Turbo V6	47	(Japan) Yusaku Shibata	Y	4, 8
(Japan) Dijon Racing	Nissan	Nissan GT-R GT3	Nissan VR38DETT 3.8 L Twin Turbo V6	47	(Japan) Shohei Yuzawa	Y	4, 8
(Japan) Dijon Racing	Nissan	Nissan GT-R GT3	Nissan VR38DETT 3.8 L Twin Turbo V6	48	(Japan) Hiroshi Takamori	Y	1–2, 4–8
(Japan) Dijon Racing	Nissan	Nissan GT-R GT3	Nissan VR38DETT 3.8 L Twin Turbo V6	48	(Japan) Masaki Tanaka	Y	1–2, 4–8
(Japan) Dijon Racing	Nissan	Nissan GT-R GT3	Nissan VR38DETT 3.8 L Twin Turbo V6	48	(Japan) Yusaku Shibata	Y	2, 5
(Japan) Arnage Racing	Mercedes-Benz	Mercedes-Benz SLS AMG GT3	Mercedes-Benz M159 6.2 L V8	50	(Japan) Masaki Kano	Y	All
(Japan) Arnage Racing	Mercedes-Benz	Mercedes-Benz SLS AMG GT3	Mercedes-Benz M159 6.2 L V8	50	(Japan) Hideto Yasuoka	Y	1–2, 5–7
(Japan) Arnage Racing	Mercedes-Benz	Mercedes-Benz SLS AMG GT3	Mercedes-Benz M159 6.2 L V8	50	(Thailand) Nanin Indra-Payoong	Y	2–5, 8
(Japan) LM corsa	BMW	BMW Z4 GT3	BMW P65B44 4.4 L V8	51	(Japan) Morio Nitta	Y	1–2, 4–8
(Japan) LM corsa	BMW	BMW Z4 GT3	BMW P65B44 4.4 L V8	51	(Japan) Shigekazu Wakisaka	Y	1–2, 4–8
(Japan) LM corsa	Lexus	Lexus RC F GT3	Lexus 2UR-GSE 5.3 L V8	60	(Japan) Akira Iida	Y	All
(Japan) LM corsa	Lexus	Lexus RC F GT3	Lexus 2UR-GSE 5.3 L V8	60	(Japan) Hiroki Yoshimoto	Y	All
(Japan) LM corsa	Lexus	Lexus RC F GT3	Lexus 2UR-GSE 5.3 L V8	60	(Germany) Dominik Farnbacher	Y	5
(Japan) Autobacs Racing Team Aguri	Honda	Honda CR-Z GT	Honda HR28TT 2.8 L Twin Turbo Hybrid V6	55	(Japan) Takashi Kobayashi	B	All
(Japan) Autobacs Racing Team Aguri	Honda	Honda CR-Z GT	Honda HR28TT 2.8 L Twin Turbo Hybrid V6	55	(Japan) Shinichi Takagi	B	All
(Japan) Autobacs Racing Team Aguri	Honda	Honda CR-Z GT	Honda HR28TT 2.8 L Twin Turbo Hybrid V6	55	(Japan) Nirei Fukuzumi	B	5
(Japan) R&D Sport	Subaru	Subaru BRZ GT300	Subaru EJ20 2.0 L Turbo F4	61	(Japan) Takuto Iguchi	D	All
(Japan) R&D Sport	Subaru	Subaru BRZ GT300	Subaru EJ20 2.0 L Turbo F4	61	(Japan) Hideki Yamauchi	D	All
(Japan) LEON Racing	Mercedes-Benz	Mercedes-Benz SLS AMG GT3	Mercedes-Benz M159 6.2 L V8	65	(Japan) Naoya Gamou	Y	All
(Japan) LEON Racing	Mercedes-Benz	Mercedes-Benz SLS AMG GT3	Mercedes-Benz M159 6.2 L V8	65	(Japan) Haruki Kurosawa	Y	All
(Japan) Direction Racing	Ferrari	Ferrari 458 Italia GT3	Ferrari F136F 4.5 L V8	77	(Japan) Kyosuke Mineo	Y	All
(Japan) Direction Racing	Ferrari	Ferrari 458 Italia GT3	Ferrari F136F 4.5 L V8	77	(Japan) Naoki Yokomizo	Y	1–3, 5–8
(Japan) Direction Racing	Ferrari	Ferrari 458 Italia GT3	Ferrari F136F 4.5 L V8	77	(Japan) Taiyo Iida	Y	2, 4–5
(Japan) Audi Team Racing Tech	Audi	Audi R8 LMS ultra	Audi CJJ 5.2 L V10	86	(Japan) Shinya Hosokawa	Y	1–5
(Japan) Audi Team Racing Tech	Audi	Audi R8 LMS ultra	Audi CJJ 5.2 L V10	86	(Germany) Christian Mamerow	Y	1–2, 4–5
(Japan) Audi Team Racing Tech	Audi	Audi R8 LMS ultra	Audi CJJ 5.2 L V10	86	(Japan) Yoshitaka Kuroda	Y	2
(Japan) Audi Team Racing Tech	Audi	Audi R8 LMS ultra	Audi CJJ 5.2 L V10	86	(Japan) Masanobu Kato	Y	3, 5
(Japan) JLOC	Lamborghini	Lamborghini Gallardo GT3	Lamborghini CEH 5.2 L V10	87	(Japan) Takayuki Aoki	Y	All
(Japan) JLOC	Lamborghini	Lamborghini Gallardo GT3	Lamborghini CEH 5.2 L V10	87	(Japan) Koji Yamanishi	Y	1–5, 7
(Japan) JLOC	Lamborghini	Lamborghini Gallardo GT3	Lamborghini CEH 5.2 L V10	87	(Japan) Yoshitaka Kuroda	Y	5
(Japan) JLOC	Lamborghini	Lamborghini Gallardo GT3	Lamborghini CEH 5.2 L V10	87	(Japan) Kimiya Sato	Y	6, 8
(Japan) JLOC	Lamborghini	Lamborghini Gallardo GT3	Lamborghini CEH 5.2 L V10	88	(Japan) Manabu Orido	Y	All
(Japan) JLOC	Lamborghini	Lamborghini Gallardo GT3	Lamborghini CEH 5.2 L V10	88	(Japan) Kazuki Hiramine	Y	1–2, 5–8
(Japan) JLOC	Lamborghini	Lamborghini Gallardo GT3	Lamborghini CEH 5.2 L V10	88	(Japan) Kimiya Sato	Y	2–5
(Japan) Rn-sports	Mercedes-Benz	Mercedes-Benz SLS AMG GT3	Mercedes-Benz M159 6.2 L V8	111	(Japan) Kazuya Tsuruta	Y	1–2, 4–8
(Japan) Rn-sports	Mercedes-Benz	Mercedes-Benz SLS AMG GT3	Mercedes-Benz M159 6.2 L V8	111	(Japan) Masayuki Ueda	Y	1–2, 4–8
(Japan) Rn-sports	Mercedes-Benz	Mercedes-Benz SLS AMG GT3	Mercedes-Benz M159 6.2 L V8	111	(Japan) Shin Ikegami	Y	2, 5
(Japan) Tomei Sports	Nissan	Nissan GT-R GT3	Nissan VR38DETT 3.8 L Twin Turbo V6	360	(Japan) Hiroki Yoshida	Y	1–2, 4–8
(Japan) Tomei Sports	Nissan	Nissan GT-R GT3	Nissan VR38DETT 3.8 L Twin Turbo V6	360	(Japan) Atsushi Tanaka	Y	1–2, 4–5, 7–8
(Japan) Tomei Sports	Nissan	Nissan GT-R GT3	Nissan VR38DETT 3.8 L Twin Turbo V6	360	(Japan) Masato Narisawa	Y	2, 5–6

=== Vehicle changes ===
- Cars Tokai Dream28 switched to race a Lotus Evora mother chassis, replacing their McLaren MP4-12C GT3 from 2014 and 2013.
- GAINER replaced their #10 Mercedes-Benz SLS AMG GT3 car with a Nissan GTR GT3, following Rn-SPORTS' split from the team.
- Pacific Racing Team will replace their Porsche 911 GT3R with a McLaren MP4-12C GT3.
- LM Corsa will expand to two cars, with their purchase of the new Lexus RCF GT3.
- Team Mach will switch from a Nissan GTR GT3 to a Toyota 86 mother chassis. New teams VivaC team Tsuchiya and Team UPGARAGE with BANDOH will also field a Toyota 86 mother chassis.
- Goodsmile Racing will replace their BMW Z4 GT3 with a Mercedes-Benz SLS AMG GT3.
- Direction Racing replaced their Porsche 911 GT3R with a Ferrari 458 Italia GT3.
- Dijon Racing would field a second Nissan GTR GT3, car #47, for only rounds 4 and 8.
- Arnage Racing will replace their Aston Martin V12 Vantage GT3 with a Mercedes-Benz SLS AMG GT3.

=== Entrant changes ===
==== GT500 ====
- Honda:
  - With the Weider Honda Racing Team leaving Super GT, Naoki Yamamoto moved to Team Kunimitsu to partner Takuya Izawa. Frederic Makowiecki will not return to the series.
  - After years of being with Real Racing, Toshihiro Kaneishi will not drive for this season, being replaced by former Team Kunimitsu driver Hideki Mutoh.
  - Weider Honda Racing leave the Super GT series, and the entrant replaced by the Drago Modulo Honda Racing Team. They utilize Bridgestone tyres. Oliver Turvey joined Drago Modulo Honda Racing, partnering Takashi Kogure.
  - Team Mugen withdrew from the series.
  - ARTA driver Vitantonio Liuzzi will be replaced by former Mugen driver Tomoki Nojiri after a disappointing season last year.
  - Nakajima Racing changed the car number from 32 to 64.
- Toyota:
  - Kazuki Nakajima, like Oliver Jarvis, will not return to focus on his LMP1 drive in the 2015 World Endurance Championship.Daisuke Ito will move from the KeePer TOM'S team to the Petronas TOM'S team. Ryo Hirakawa, who previously drove for the Petronas TOM'S team, joined the KeePer TOM'S team.
  - Oliver Jarvis left the series to drive for Audi Sport Team Joest in the 2015 World Endurance Championship. Former F1 driver Heikki Kovalainen joined the SARD team, replacing Oliver Jarvis.Hiroaki Ishiura swapped seats with Kohei Hirate at the Zent Cerumo Team, while Hirate for SARD.
- Nissan:
  - Lucas Ordonez moves from NDDP Racing to drive for Kondo Racing for the first three rounds. Michael Krumm replaces him to drive the remaining rounds.

==== GT300 ====
- Yuhki Nakayama dropped to GT300, and drive for the new UPGARAGE with BANDOH team. Former Sauber F1 test driver Marko Asmer partner Yuhki Nakayama in the UPGARAGE with BANDOH team.
- Porsche Team KTR overhauled their driver line-up, recruiting Rebellion Racing driver Alexandre Imperatori and All-Japan Formula Three Championship driver Kenta Yamashita.
- Hideki Yamauchi moved from GAINER to R&D Sport, replacing Kota Sasaki.
- Morio Nitta, who drove for apr in the Toyota Prius, moved to LM Corsa to drive the #51 BMW Z4 GT3, along with Shigekazu Wakisaka.
- Asian Le Mans Series driver Takamitsu Matsui drive for the new VivaC team Tsuchiya.
- All-Japan Formula Three Championship driver Mitsunori Takaboshi will drive for NDDP Racing with Kazuki Hoshino in the Nissan GTR GT3.
- Team Taisan withdrew from the series.
- Audi Team Racing Tech join the series with an Audi R8 LMS ultra.
- R&D Sport will switch to Dunlop tyres.

==== Mid-season changes ====
- From round 6 and up, Team UPGARAGE with BANDOH will change their racing number from 18 to 20.
- Audi Team Racing Tech left the series after the Suzuka round due to a severe accident. They will return in 2016 with the upgraded Audi R8 LMS ultra.

== Calendar ==
Round	Circuit	Date	Class	Pole position	Race winner
1	(Japan) Okayama International Circuit; Report	5 April	GT500	No. 37 Lexus Team KeePer TOM'S	No. 37 Lexus Team KeePer TOM'S
1	(Japan) Okayama International Circuit; Report	5 April	GT500	(Italy) Andrea Caldarelli (Japan) Ryō Hirakawa	(Italy) Andrea Caldarelli (Japan) Ryō Hirakawa
1	(Japan) Okayama International Circuit; Report	5 April	GT300	No. 10 Gainer	No. 31 apr
1	(Japan) Okayama International Circuit; Report	5 April	GT300	(Japan) Katsumasa Chiyo (Macau) André Couto	(Japan) Yuichi Nakayama (Japan) Koki Saga
2	(Japan) Fuji Speedway; Report	3 May	GT500	No. 1 Nismo	No. 1 Nismo
2	(Japan) Fuji Speedway; Report	3 May	GT500	(Japan) Tsugio Matsuda (Italy) Ronnie Quintarelli	(Japan) Tsugio Matsuda (Italy) Ronnie Quintarelli
2	(Japan) Fuji Speedway; Report	3 May	GT300	No. 31 apr	No. 10 Gainer
2	(Japan) Fuji Speedway; Report	3 May	GT300	(Japan) Yuichi Nakayama (Japan) Koki Saga (Japan) Kota Sasaki	(Japan) Katsumasa Chiyo (Macau) André Couto (Japan) Ryuichiro Tomita
3	(Thailand) Chang International Circuit; Report	21 June	GT500	No. 38 Lexus Team ZENT Cerumo	No. 46 MOLA
3	(Thailand) Chang International Circuit; Report	21 June	GT500	(Japan) Hiroaki Ishiura (Japan) Yuji Tachikawa	(Japan) Satoshi Motoyama (Japan) Masataka Yanagida
3	(Thailand) Chang International Circuit; Report	21 June	GT300	No. 25 VivaC team Tsuchiya	No. 3 NDDP Racing
3	(Thailand) Chang International Circuit; Report	21 June	GT300	(Japan) Takamitsu Matsui (Japan) Takeshi Tsuchiya	(Japan) Kazuki Hoshino (Japan) Mitsunori Takaboshi
4	(Japan) Fuji Speedway; Report	9 August	GT500	No. 38 Lexus Team ZENT Cerumo	No. 24 Kondo Racing
4	(Japan) Fuji Speedway; Report	9 August	GT500	(Japan) Hiroaki Ishiura (Japan) Yuji Tachikawa	(Japan) Daiki Sasaki (Germany) Michael Krumm
4	(Japan) Fuji Speedway; Report	9 August	GT300	No. 55 Autobacs Racing Team Aguri	No. 55 Autobacs Racing Team Aguri
4	(Japan) Fuji Speedway; Report	9 August	GT300	(Japan) Takashi Kobayashi (Japan) Shinichi Takagi	(Japan) Takashi Kobayashi (Japan) Shinichi Takagi
5	(Japan) Suzuka Circuit; Report	30 August	GT500	No. 1 Nismo	No. 36 Lexus Team Petronas TOM'S
5	(Japan) Suzuka Circuit; Report	30 August	GT500	(Japan) Tsugio Matsuda (Italy) Ronnie Quintarelli	(Japan) Daisuke Ito (United Kingdom) James Rossiter
5	(Japan) Suzuka Circuit; Report	30 August	GT300	No. 2 Cars Tokai Dream28	No. 10 Gainer
5	(Japan) Suzuka Circuit; Report	30 August	GT300	(Japan) Hiroki Katoh (Japan) Kazuho Takahashi (Japan) Hiroshi Hamaguchi	(Macau) André Couto (Japan) Katsumasa Chiyo (Japan) Ryuichiro Tomita
6	(Japan) Sportsland SUGO; Report	20 September	GT500	No. 46 MOLA	No. 100 Team Kunimitsu
6	(Japan) Sportsland SUGO; Report	20 September	GT500	(Japan) Satoshi Motoyama (Japan) Masataka Yanagida	(Japan) Takuya Izawa (Japan) Naoki Yamamoto
6	(Japan) Sportsland SUGO; Report	20 September	GT300	No. 55 Autobacs Racing Team Aguri	No. 25 VivaC team Tsuchiya
6	(Japan) Sportsland SUGO; Report	20 September	GT300	(Japan) Takashi Kobayashi (Japan) Shinichi Takagi	(Japan) Takamitsu Matsui (Japan) Takeshi Tsuchiya
7	(Japan) Autopolis; Report	1 November	GT500	No. 12 Team Impul	No. 1 Nismo
7	(Japan) Autopolis; Report	1 November	GT500	(Brazil) João Paulo de Oliveira (Japan) Hironobu Yasuda	(Japan) Tsugio Matsuda (Italy) Ronnie Quintarelli
7	(Japan) Autopolis; Report	1 November	GT300	No. 2 Cars Tokai Dream28	No. 3 NDDP Racing
7	(Japan) Autopolis; Report	1 November	GT300	(Japan) Hiroki Katoh (Japan) Kazuho Takahashi	(Japan) Kazuki Hoshino (Japan) Mitsunori Takaboshi
8	(Japan) Twin Ring Motegi; Report	15 November	GT500	No. 37 Lexus Team KeePer TOM'S	No. 37 Lexus Team KeePer TOM'S
8	(Japan) Twin Ring Motegi; Report	15 November	GT500	(Italy) Andrea Caldarelli (Japan) Ryō Hirakawa	(Italy) Andrea Caldarelli (Japan) Ryō Hirakawa
8	(Japan) Twin Ring Motegi; Report	15 November	GT300	No. 31 apr	No. 31 apr
8	(Japan) Twin Ring Motegi; Report	15 November	GT300	(Japan) Yuichi Nakayama (Japan) Koki Saga	(Japan) Yuichi Nakayama (Japan) Koki Saga

== Championship standings ==
Scoring system

Position	1st	2nd	3rd	4th	5th	6th	7th	8th	9th	10th
Points	20	15	11	8	6	5	4	3	2	1
Suzuka	25	18	13	10	8	6	5	4	3	2

=== Drivers' championships ===
==== GT500 ====
Rank	Driver	No.	OKA (Japan)	FUJ (Japan)	CHA (Thailand)	FUJ (Japan)	SUZ (Japan)	SUG (Japan)	AUT (Japan)	MOT (Japan)	Pts.
1	(Japan) Tsugio Matsuda (Italy) Ronnie Quintarelli	1	13	1	5	4	7	6	1	2	79
2	(Brazil) João Paulo de Oliveira (Japan) Hironobu Yasuda	12	7	2	4	3	3	11	2	4	74
3	(Japan) Takuya Izawa (Japan) Naoki Yamamoto	100	2	Ret	Ret	5	5	1	11	3	60
4	(Japan) Hiroaki Ishiura (Japan) Yuji Tachikawa	38	3	Ret	Ret	2	2	10	4	5	59
5	(Italy) Andrea Caldarelli (Japan) Ryō Hirakawa	37	1	6	6	12	8	9	12	1	56
6	(Japan) Satoshi Motoyama (Japan) Masataka Yanagida	46	8	10	1	14	6	2	6	Ret	50
7	(Japan) Daisuke Itō (United Kingdom) James Rossiter	36	14	3	7	7	1	13	5	Ret	49
8	(Japan) Hideki Mutoh (Japan) Koudai Tsukakoshi	17	12	4	3	8	Ret	8	3	8	39
9	(Japan) Yuji Kunimoto (Japan) Kazuya Oshima	6	9	9	2	13	Ret	4	8	9	32
10	(Japan) Daiki Sasaki	24	11	11	Ret	1	13	3	15	12	31
10	(Germany) Michael Krumm	24				1	13	3	15	12	31
11	(Japan) Yuhi Sekiguchi (Japan) Juichi Wakisaka	19	10	7	9	10	4	5	9	10	27
12	(Japan) Takashi Kogure (United Kingdom) Oliver Turvey	15	6	8	10	6	12	7	7	7	26
13	(Japan) Kohei Hirate (Finland) Heikki Kovalainen	39	5	5	7	9	11	Ret	13	6	23
14	(Japan) Kosuke Matsuura (Japan) Tomoki Nojiri	8	4	13	Ret	Ret	10	12	14	11	10
15	(Belgium) Bertrand Baguette (Japan) Daisuke Nakajima	64	Ret	12	11	11	9	Ret	10	13	4
-	(Spain) Lucas Ordóñez	24	11	11	Ret						0
-	(Austria) Christian Klien	39					11				0
Rank	Driver	No.	OKA (Japan)	FUJ (Japan)	CHA (Thailand)	FUJ (Japan)	SUZ (Japan)	SUG (Japan)	AUT (Japan)	MOT (Japan)	Pts.

Colour	Result
Gold	Winner
Silver	Second place
Bronze	Third place
Green	Points classification
Blue	Non-points classification
Blue	Non-classified finish (NC)
Purple	Retired, not classified (Ret)
Red	Did not qualify (DNQ)
Red	Did not pre-qualify (DNPQ)
Black	Disqualified (DSQ)
White	Did not start (DNS)
White	Withdrew (WD)
White	Race cancelled (C)
Blank	Did not practice (DNP)
Blank	Did not arrive (DNA)
Blank	Excluded (EX)

==== GT500 Teams' standings ====
Rank	Team	No.	OKA (Japan)	FUJ (Japan)	BUR (Thailand)	FUJ (Japan)	SUZ (Japan)	SUG (Japan)	AUT (Japan)	MOT (Japan)	Pts.
1	Nismo	1	13	1	5	4	7	6	1	2	100
2	Team Impul	12	7	2	4	3	3	11	2	4	96
3	Team Kunimitsu	100	2	Ret	Ret	5	5	1	11	3	76
4	Lexus Team KeePer TOM'S	37	1	6	6	12	8	9	12	1	75
5	Lexus Team ZENT Cerumo	38	3	Ret	Ret	2	2	10	4	5	75
6	MOLA	46	8	10	1	14	6	2	6	Ret	66
7	Lexus Team Petronas TOM'S	36	14	3	7	7	1	13	5	Ret	66
8	Keihin Real Racing	17	12	4	3	8	Ret	8	3	8	58
9	Lexus Team LeMans ENEOS	6	9	9	2	13	Ret	4	8	9	49
10	Lexus Team WedsSport Bandoh	19	10	7	9	10	4	5	9	10	47
11	Drago Modulo Honda Racing	15	6	8	10	6	12	7	7	7	46
12	Kondo Racing	24	11	11	Ret	1	13	3	15	12	43
13	Lexus Team SARD	39	5	5	7	9	11	Ret	13	6	40
14	Autobacs Racing Team Aguri	8	4	13	Ret	Ret	10	12	14	11	19
15	Nakajima Racing	64	Ret	12	11	11	9	Ret	10	13	13
Rank	Team	No.	OKA (Japan)	FUJ (Japan)	BUR (Thailand)	FUJ (Japan)	SUZ (Japan)	SUG (Japan)	AUT (Japan)	MOT (Japan)	Pts.

==== GT300 ====
Rank	Driver	No.	OKA (Japan)	FUJ (Japan)	CHA (Thailand)	FUJ (Japan)	SUZ (Japan)	SUG (Japan)	AUT (Japan)	MOT (Japan)	Pts.
1	(Macau) André Couto	10	7	1	2	6	1	6	2	6	94
2	(Japan) Katsumasa Chiyo	10	7	1		6	1		2	6	74
3	(Japan) Yuichi Nakayama (Japan) Koki Saga	31	1	4	9	9	10	2	13	1	69
4	(Japan) Kazuki Hoshino (Japan) Mitsunori Takaboshi	3	8	2	1	Ret	14	8	1	Ret	61
5	(Japan) Katsuyuki Hiranaka (Sweden) Björn Wirdheim	11	12	3	4	3	11	3	Ret	3	52
6	(Japan) Takashi Kobayashi (Japan) Shinichi Takagi	55	2	17	10	1	12	12	6	4	49
7	(Japan) Seiji Ara (Germany) Jörg Müller	7	Ret	6	3	Ret	2	19	3	9	47
8	(Japan) Ryuichiro Tomita	10		1	2		1	6			45
9	(Japan) Naoya Gamou (Japan) Haruki Kurosawa	65	22	7	5	2	6	7	12	5	41
10	(Japan) Takeshi Tsuchiya	25	6	Ret	7	5	23	1	Ret	12	35
10	(Japan) Takamitsu Matsui	25	6	Ret	7	5	23	1			35
11	(Japan) Tatsuya Kataoka (Japan) Nobuteru Taniguchi	0	5	5	13	18	8	16	7	2	35
12	(Japan) Takuto Iguchi (Japan) Hideki Yamauchi	61	17	8	6	8	3	5	Ret	11	30
13	(Japan) Tomonobu Fujii (United Kingdom) Richard Lyons	21	3	Ret	19	20	5	13	5	8	28
14	(Japan) Manabu Orido	88	Ret	Ret	17	7	4	4	Ret	7	26
15	(Japan) Kazuki Hiramine	88	Ret	Ret			4	4	Ret	7	22
16	(Japan) Morio Nitta (Japan) Shigekazu Wakisaka	51	9	9		4	Ret	9	17	15	14
17	(Japan) Kyosuke Mineo	77	11	13	18	12	9	11	4	10	12
17	(Japan) Naoki Yokomizo	77	11	13	18		9	11	4	10	12
18	(Japan) Kota Sasaki	31		4			10	15			10
19	(Japan) Shinya Hosokawa	86	4	10	16	Ret	17				9
19	(Germany) Christian Mamerow	86	4	10		Ret	17				9
20	(Japan) Kenta Yamashita	33	14	12	8	Ret	18	17	8	14	6
21	(Japan) Hiroki Katoh (Japan) Kazuho Takahashi	2	16	Ret	11	22	7	Ret	21	13	5
21	(Japan) Hiroshi Hamaguchi	2					7				5
22	(Japan) Kimiya Sato	88/87		Ret	17	7	4	18		16	4
23	(Switzerland) Alexandre Imperatori	33	14	12	8	Ret					3
23	(Japan) Yuya Sakamoto	33					18	17	8	14	3
24	(Japan) Taiyo Iida	77		13		12	9				3
25	(Japan) Yuhki Nakayama	18/20	19	Ret	Ret	Ret	21	15	9	Ret	2
25	(Japan) Yuji Ide	18/20	19	Ret	Ret	Ret		Ret	9	Ret	2
26	(Japan) Masaki Jyonai (Japan) Hisashi Wada	22	DNS		15	10	16	10	22	24	2
27	(Japan) Akira Iida (Japan) Hiroki Yoshimoto	60	10	Ret	Ret	15	19	22	10	17	2
-	(Japan) Takayuki Aoki	87	20	DNS	Ret	11	24	18	11	16	0
-	(Japan) Koji Yamanishi	87	20	DNS	Ret	11	24		11		0
-	(Japan) Masaki Kano	50	18	11	14	Ret	Ret	20	16	22	0
-	(Thailand) Nanin-Indra Payoong	50		11	14	Ret	Ret			22	0
-	(Japan) Hideto Yasuoka	50	18	11			Ret	20	16		0
-	(Thailand) Chonsawat Asavahame (Czech Republic) Tomáš Enge	28			12						0
-	(Japan) Yuki Iwasaki (Japan) Hiroshi Koizumi	30	13	16	Ret	17	13	24	18	18	0
-	(Japan) Kazuya Tsuruta (Japan) Masayuki Ueda	111	21	14		13	20	14	19	19	0
-	(Japan) Hiroshi Takamori (Japan) Masaki Tanaka	48	15	18		14	15	21	15	25	0
-	(Japan) Hiroki Yoshida	360	24	15		21	Ret	Ret	14	23	0
-	(Japan) Atsushi Tanaka	360	24	15		21	Ret		14	23	0
-	(Japan) Shin Ikegami	111		14			20				0
-	(Belgium) Wolfgang Reip	3					14				0
-	(Japan) Yusaku Shibata	48/47		18		19	15			20	0
-	(Japan) Masato Narisawa	360		15			Ret	Ret			0
-	(Japan) Masanobu Kato	86			16		17				0
-	(Japan) Takuya Shirasaka	9	23	Ret		16	22	23	20	Ret	0
-	(Japan) Ryohei Sakaguchi	9				16	22	23	20	Ret	0
-	(Japan) Masami Kageyama	30		16							0
-	(Japan) Shohei Yuzawa	47				19					0
-	(Germany) Dominik Farnbacher	60					19				0
-	(Estonia) Marko Asmer	18/20		Ret			21				0
-	(New Zealand) Nick Cassidy	20					21				0
-	(Japan) Daisuke Yamawaki	9		Ret			22				0
-	(Japan) Tohjiro Azuma	9	23	Ret							0
-	(Japan) Tatsuya Tanigawa	25					23		Ret	12	0
-	(Japan) Shogo Mitsuyama (Japan) Tetsuji Tamanaka	5	Ret	Ret		Ret	Ret		Ret	21	0
Drivers ineligible for championship points
-	(Japan) Yoshitaka Kuroda	86/87		10			24				0
-	(Japan) Nirei Fukuzumi	55					12				0
-	(Monaco) Stéphane Ortelli	21		Ret							0
-	(Japan) Junichiro Yamashita	5		Ret							0
Rank	Driver	No.	OKA (Japan)	FUJ (Japan)	CHA (Thailand)	FUJ (Japan)	SUZ (Japan)	SUG (Japan)	AUT (Japan)	MOT (Japan)	Pts.

==== GT300 Teams' standings ====
Rank	Team	No.	OKA (Japan)	FUJ (Japan)	BUR (Thailand)	FUJ (Japan)	SUZ (Japan)	SUG (Japan)	AUT (Japan)	MOT (Japan)	Pts.
1	Gainer	10	7	1	2	6	1	6	2	6	116
2	apr	31	1	4	9	9	10	2	13	1	93
3	NDDP Racing	3	8	2	1	Ret	14	8	1	Ret	75
4	Gainer	11	12	3	4	3	11	3	Ret	3	71
5	Autobacs Racing Team Aguri	55	2	17	10	1	12	12	6	4	69
6	BMW Sports Trophy Team Studie	7	Ret	6	3	Ret	2	19	3	9	65
7	Leon Racing	65	22	7	5	2	6	7	12	5	63
8	Goodsmile Racing & Team Ukyo	0	5	5	13	18	8	16	7	2	55
9	VivaC team Tsuchiya	25	6	Ret	7	5	23	1	Ret	12	51
10	R&D Sport	61	17	8	6	8	3	5	Ret	11	49
11	Audi Team Hitotsuyama	21	3	Ret	19	20	5	13	5	8	45
12	JLOC	88	Ret	Ret	17	7	4	4	Ret	7	39
13	LM corsa	61	17	8	6	8	3	5	Ret	11	28
14	Direction Racing	77	11	13	18	12	9	11	4	10	28
15	Porsche Team KTR	33	14	12	8	Ret	18	17	8	14	19
16	Audi Team Racing Tech	86	4	10	16	Ret	17				15
17	Cars Tokai Dream28	2	16	Ret	11	22	7	Ret	21	13	15
18	R'QS Motorsports	22	DNS		15	10	16	10	22	24	12
19	LM corsa	60	10	Ret	Ret	15	19	22	10	17	10
20	JLOC	87	20	DNS	Ret	11	24	18	11	16	10
21	Rn-sports	111	21	14		13	20	14	19	19	9
22	Dijon Racing	48	15	18		14	15	21	15	25	9
23	Arnage Racing	50	18	11	14	Ret	Ret	20	16	22	8
24	apr	30	13	16	Ret	17	13	24	18	18	7
25	Tomei Sports	360	24	15		21	Ret	Ret	14	23	7
26	Team Up Garage with Bandoh	20						15	9	Ret	5
27	Pacific Racing Team	9	23	Ret		16	22	23	20	Ret	5
28	Team Up Garage with Bandoh	18	19	Ret	Ret	Ret	21				2
29	Dijon Racing	47				19				20	2
30	Team Mach	5	Ret	Ret		Ret	Ret		Ret	21	1
-	Reiter Vattana Motorsport	28			12						0
Rank	Team	No.	OKA (Japan)	FUJ (Japan)	BUR (Thailand)	FUJ (Japan)	SUZ (Japan)	SUG (Japan)	AUT (Japan)	MOT (Japan)	Pts.
