= Yuji Kunimoto =

Japanese racing driver

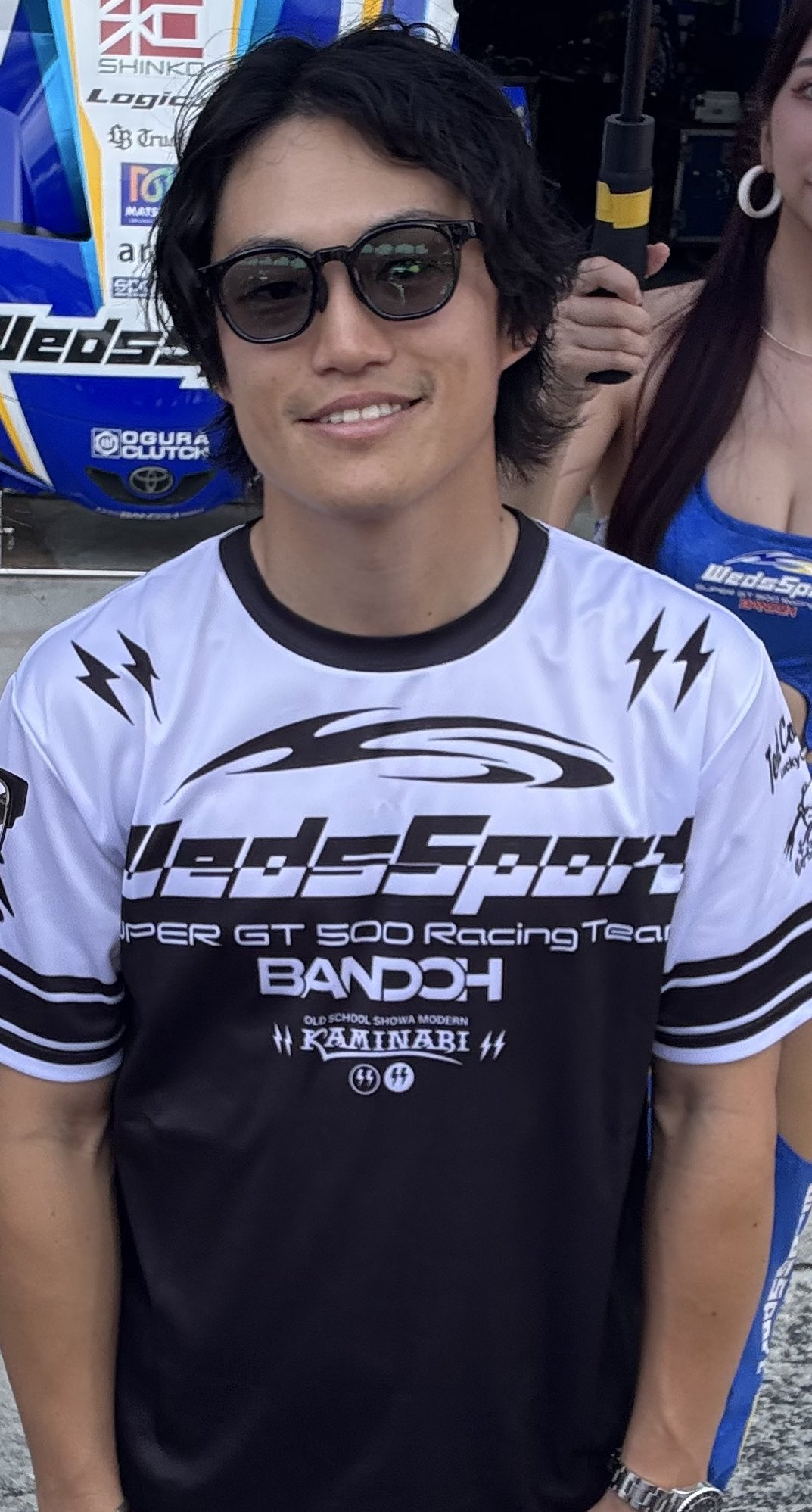
- Kunimoto at the 2025 Super GT Malaysia Festival
- Nationality: (Japan) Japanese
- Born: 12 September 1990 (age 36) Yokohama, Kanagawa, Japan
- Relatives: Keisuke Kunimoto (brother)

Super GT - GT500 career
- Debut season: 2012
- Current team: Racing Project Bandoh
- Categorisation: FIA Platinum
- Car number: 19
- Former teams: Kraft, Team LeMans
- Starts: 112
- Wins: 3
- Podiums: 14
- Poles: 7
- Best finish: 4th in 2016

Previous series
- 2013–24 2011–12 2009–10 2009–10 2008 2007–08 2007: Super Formula; Formula Nippon; Super GT - GT300; All-Japan Formula Three; Formula BMW Pacific; Formula Challenge Japan; Formula Toyota

Championship titles
- 2016 2010 2008: Super Formula; All-Japan Formula Three; Formula Challenge Japan

Yuji Kunimoto (国本雄資, Kunimoto Yūji; born 12 September 1990) is a Japanese racing driver of Zainichi Korean descent who competes in Super GT for Racing Project Bandoh. He is the champion of the 2016 Super Formula Championship and the 2010 Japanese Formula 3 Championship. He also drove for Toyota Gazoo Racing in LMP1 at the 2017 24 Hours of Le Mans.

He is the younger brother of 2008 Macau Grand Prix winner Keisuke Kunimoto.

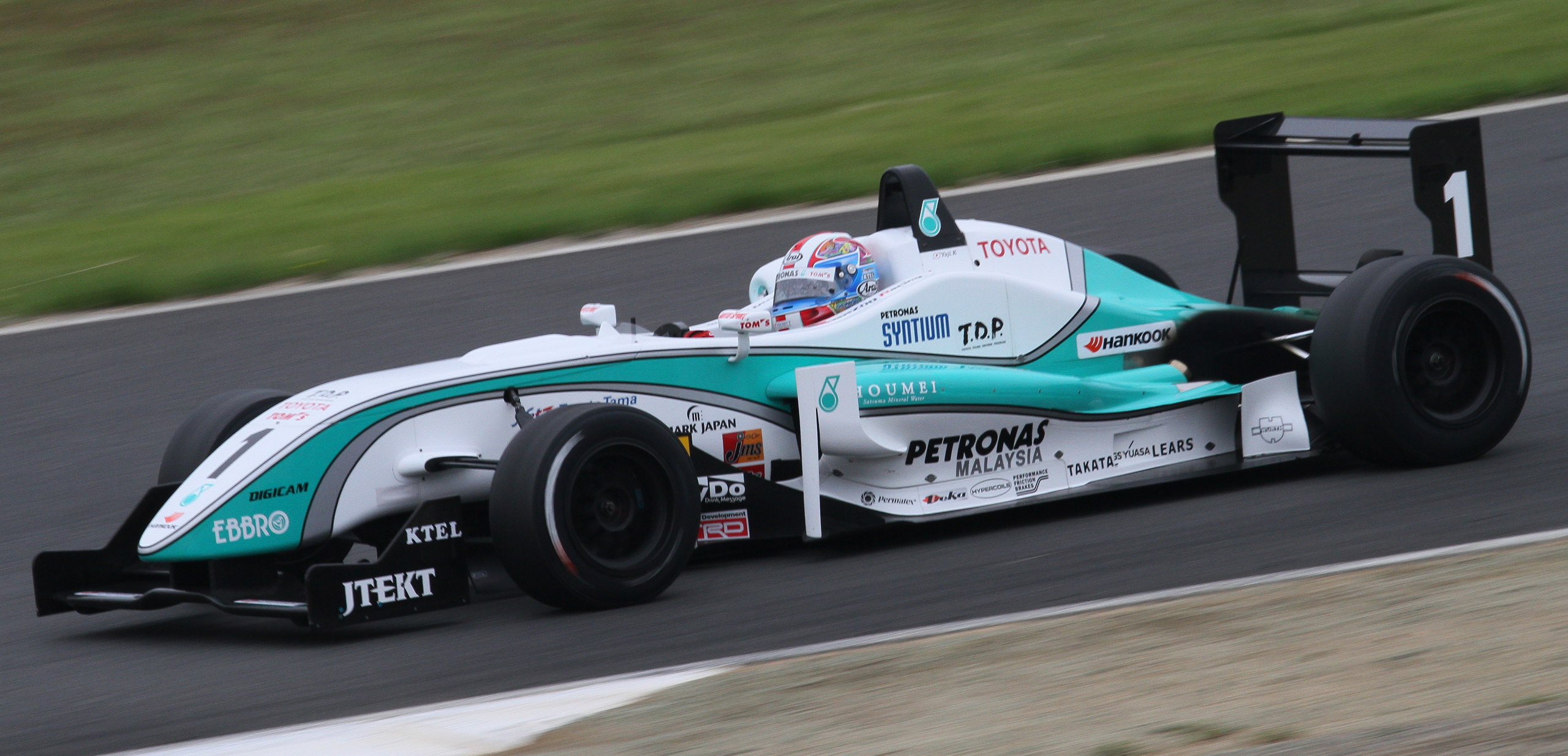
Kunimoto en route to his fourth successive victory of the 2010 All-Japan Formula Three season at Motegi.

== Early career highlights ==
- 2008 Formula Challenge Japan, Series Champion; Formula BMW, Macau GP Support race, 5th position
- 2007 Formula Toyota, 10th Overall; Formula Challenge Japan, 4th Overall
- 2006 All Japan Kart Championship, FA Class, 8th Overall
- 2005 All Japan Kart Championship, ICA Class, 3rd Overall
- 2004 All Japan Kart Championship, ICA Class, 7th Overall; F-ARTA Arta Challenge Series
- 2003 All Japan Kart Championship, ICA Class; F-ARTA Arta Challenge Series
- 2002 All Japan Junior Kart Championship, 4th Overall
- 2001 All Japan Junior Kart Championship, 12th Overall

== Career ==
From 2009 to 2010, Kunimoto competed in Japanese Formula 3 Championship with TOM'S where he clinched third place, and was champion the next year.

=== Super GT ===
Kunimoto made his debut in the series' GT300 Class with apr on 2009 with Takuto Iguchi. For the next two seasons, he paired with Morio Nitta. The latter pair clinched one win and four podium during two season in 2010 & 2011.

Kunimoto then stepped up to GT500 with Kraft in 2012 with Andrea Caldarelli new to the series, as the pair clinched one podium in the season. Kunimoto then moved to Team LeMans partnering Kazuya Oshima for three seasons. Both pairs only won once from 2013, and five podiums. For 2016, Kunimoto moved to WedsSport Bandoh alongside Yuhi Sekiguchi. He won only once on that season. After that, he became the main driver for Bandoh for four seasons, with Kenta Yamashita, Sho Tsuboi, Ritomo Miyata, and Sena Sakaguchi as his teammate. Kunimoto won again with Sakaguchi in 2-23 at Suzuka Circuit. For 2024, he stayed with the same team and teammate.

=== Super Formula ===
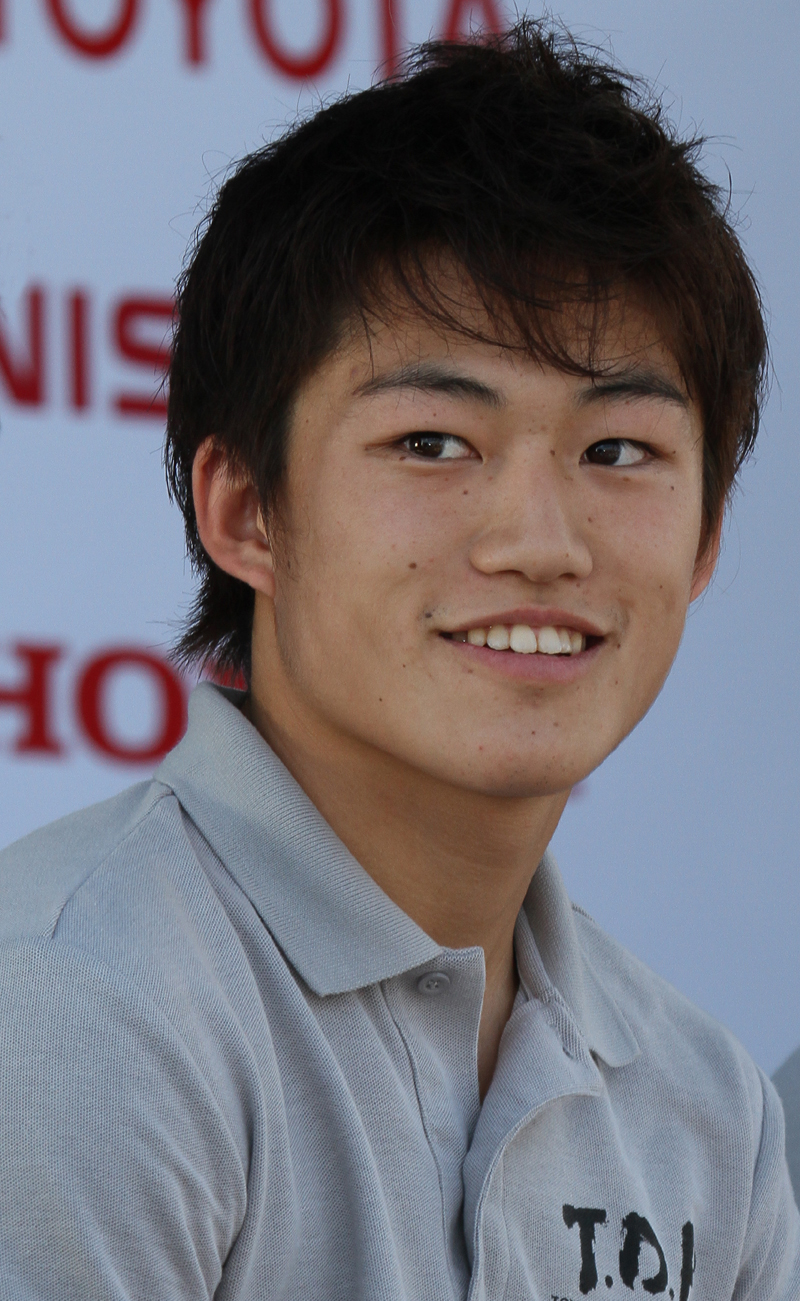
Kunimoto in 2010.

Kunimoto made his debut in Formula Nippon in 2011 with Cerumo・INGING as a single car entry. Kunimoto then won the series title in 2016 with his maiden two wins and four podiums, as he beat Andre Lotterer by three points. After that, he did not win another title, and race till now. After eight seasons with Cerumo INGING, he moved to Kondo Racing in 2019, then KCMG. For 2024, Kunimoto moves to Team Impul with Theo Pourchaire.

=== 24 Hours of Le Mans ===
Kunimoto made a wildcard debut with Toyota Gazoo Racing for 2017 24 Hours of Le Mans. He paired with Jose Maria Lopez, and Nicolas Lapierre. The car only completed 160 laps, and did not finish the race.

== Racing record ==
=== Career summary ===
| Season | Series | Team | Races | Wins | Poles | F/Laps | Podiums | Points | Position |
|---|---|---|---|---|---|---|---|---|---|
| 2008 | Formula Challenge Japan | TDP Scholarship | 16 | 8 | 7 | 5 | 15 | 272 | **1st** |
| 2009 | Japanese Formula 3 Championship | Petronas Team TOM'S | 16 | 4 | 4 | 2 | 11 | 97 | **3rd** |
| 2009 | Super GT - GT300 | apr | 9 | 0 | 0 | 0 | 0 | 32 | 10th |
| 2010 | Japanese Formula 3 Championship | Petronas Team TOM'S | 16 | 10 | 9 | 10 | 12 | 139 | **1st** |
| 2010 | Super GT - GT300 | apr | 7 | 1 | 0 | 1 | 3 | 47 | 5th |
| 2011 | Super GT - GT300 | apr | 8 | 0 | 0 | 0 | 1 | 38 | 7th |
| 2011 | Formula Nippon | Project μ//cerumo・INGING | 7 | 0 | 0 | 0 | 0 | 6.5 | 10th |
| 2012 | Super GT - GT500 | Lexus Team KeePer Kraft | 8 | 0 | 0 | 0 | 1 | 28 | 13th |
| 2012 | Formula Nippon | Project μ//cerumo・INGING | 8 | 0 | 0 | 0 | 0 | 2 | 13th |
| 2013 | Super GT - GT500 | Lexus Team LeMans ENEOS | 8 | 1 | 1 | 0 | 2 | 52 | 5th |
| 2013 | Super Formula | P.mu/cerumo・INGING | 7 | 0 | 0 | 0 | 0 | 10 | 10th |
| 2014 | Super GT - GT500 | Lexus Team LeMans ENEOS | 8 | 0 | 0 | 0 | 2 | 44 | 7th |
| 2014 | Super Formula | P.mu/cerumo・INGING | 9 | 0 | 0 | 0 | 2 | 19.5 | 7th |
| 2015 | Super GT - GT500 | Lexus Team LeMans ENEOS | 8 | 0 | 0 | 0 | 1 | 32 | 9th |
| 2015 | Super Formula | P.mu/cerumo・INGING | 8 | 0 | 0 | 0 | 0 | 7.5 | 9th |
| 2016 | Super GT - GT500 | Lexus Team WedsSport Bandoh | 8 | 1 | 1 | 0 | 2 | 58 | 4th |
| 2016 | Super Formula | P.mu/cerumo・INGING | 9 | 2 | 0 | 0 | 4 | 33 | **1st** |
| 2017 | Super GT - GT500 | Lexus Team WedsSport Bandoh | 7 | 0 | 0 | 0 | 0 | 22 | 14th |
| 2017 | Super Formula | P.mu/cerumo・INGING | 7 | 0 | 1 | 0 | 1 | 16 | 8th |
| 2017 | 24 Hours of Le Mans | Toyota Gazoo Racing | 1 | 0 | 0 | 0 | 0 | 0 | DNF |
| 2018 | Super GT - GT500 | Lexus Team WedsSport Bandoh | 8 | 0 | 0 | 0 | 2 | 32 | 11th |
| 2018 | Super Formula | JMS P.mu/cerumo・INGING | 8 | 0 | 0 | 0 | 0 | 11.5 | 8th |
| 2019 | Super GT - GT500 | Lexus Team WedsSport Bandoh | 8 | 0 | 2 | 0 | 1 | 27.5 | 11th |
| 2019 | Super Formula | Kondo Racing | 7 | 0 | 0 | 0 | 0 | 5 | 17th |
| 2020 | Super GT - GT500 | TGR Team WedsSport Bandoh | 8 | 0 | 0 | 0 | 0 | 10 | 17th |
| 2020 | Super Formula | carrozzeria KCMG | 7 | 0 | 0 | 0 | 1 | 29 | 9th |
| 2021 | Super GT - GT500 | TGR Team WedsSport Bandoh | 8 | 0 | 2 | 1 | 2 | 36 | 11th |
| 2021 | Super Formula | carrozzeria KCMG | 7 | 0 | 0 | 0 | 0 | 3 | 18th |
| 2021 | Super Taikyu - ST-4 | Hayashi Telempu SHADE Racing | 6 | 3 | 0 | 2 | 6 | 130‡ | **1st‡** |
| 2022 | Super GT - GT500 | TGR Team WedsSport Bandoh | 8 | 0 | 4 | 0 | 0 | 28.5 | 11th |
| 2022 | Super Formula | KCMG | 10 | 0 | 0 | 0 | 0 | 10 | 16th |
| 2022 | Super Taikyu - ST-4 | SHADE Racing | 6 | 1 | 1 | 3 | 6 | 142‡ | **2nd‡** |
| 2023 | Super GT - GT500 | TGR Team WedsSport Bandoh | 8 | 1 | 0 | 0 | 0 | 30 | 12th |
| 2023 | Super Formula | Kids com Team KCMG | 9 | 0 | 0 | 0 | 0 | 7 | 17th |
| 2023 | Super Taikyu - ST-4 | SHADE Racing | 6 | 0 | 3 | 0 | 1 | 56‡ | 7th‡ |
| 2024 | Super Formula | Itochu Enex Team Impul | 9 | 0 | 0 | 0 | 0 | 7 | 13th |
| 2024 | Super GT - GT500 | TGR Team WedsSport Bandoh | 8 | 0 | 0 | 0 | 0 | 6 | 15th |
| 2024 | Super Taikyu - ST-4 | SHADE Racing | | | | | | | |
| 2025 | Super GT - GT500 | TGR Team WedsSport Bandoh | 8 | 0 | 1 | 1 | 0 | 18.5 | 15th |
| 2025 | Super Taikyu - ST-Z | SHADE Racing | | | | | | | |
| 2026 | Super GT - GT500 | TGR Team WedsSport Bandoh | 8 | 0 | 0 | 0 | 0 | 9 | 15th |
| 2026 | Super Taikyu - ST-Z | SHADE Racing | | | | | | | |
| 2026 | SRO Japan Cup - GT4 | Akiland Racing | 4 | 1 | 0 | 0 | 3 | 79 | **3rd** |

‡ Team standings

=== Complete Super GT results ===
| Year | Team | Car | Class | 1 | 2 | 3 | 4 | 5 | 6 | 7 | 8 | 9 | DC | Pts |
|---|---|---|---|---|---|---|---|---|---|---|---|---|---|---|
| 2009 | apr | Toyota Corolla Axio | GT300 | OKA; 5 | SUZ; 9 | FUJ; 8 | SEP; 16 | SUG; 8 | SUZ; 4 | FUJ; 12 | AUT; 7 | MOT; 5 | 10th | 32 |
| 2010 | apr | Toyota Corolla Axio | GT300 | SUZ; 8 | OKA; 9 | FUJ; 1 | SEP; 3 | SUG; Ret | SUZ; 3 | FUJ; C | MOT; 17 | | 5th | 47 |
| 2011 | apr | Toyota Corolla Axio | GT300 | OKA; 6 | FUJ; 7 | SEP; 6 | SUG; 2 | SUZ; 7 | FUJ; 14 | AUT; 8 | MOT; 9 | | 7th | 38 |
| 2012 | Lexus Team KeePer Kraft | Lexus SC430 | GT500 | OKA; Ret | FUJ; 12 | SEP; 10 | SUG; 6 | SUZ; 2 | FUJ; 7 | AUT; 13 | MOT; Ret | | 13th | 28 |
| 2013 | Lexus Team LeMans ENEOS | Lexus SC430 | GT500 | OKA; 7 | FUJ; 3 | SEP; 7 | SUG; 6 | SUZ; Ret | FUJ; 4 | AUT; 11 | MOT; 1 | | 5th | 52 |
| 2014 | Lexus Team LeMans ENEOS | Lexus RC F | GT500 | OKA; 2 | FUJ; 3 | AUT; 9 | SUG; 5 | FUJ; 13 | SUZ; 5 | BUR; 9 | MOT; 11 | | 7th | 44 |
| 2015 | Lexus Team LeMans ENEOS | Lexus RC F | GT500 | OKA; 9 | FUJ; 9 | CHA; 2 | FUJ; 13 | SUZ; Ret | SUG; 4 | AUT; 8 | MOT; 9 | | 9th | 32 |
| 2016 | Lexus Team WedsSport BANDOH | Lexus RC F | GT500 | OKA; 9 | FUJ; 8 | SUG; 5 | FUJ; 10 | SUZ; 5 | **CHA**; 1 | MOT; 5 | MOT; 3 | | 4th | 58 |
| 2017 | Lexus Team WedsSport BANDOH | Lexus LC 500 | GT500 | OKA; 6 | FUJ | AUT; 8 | SUG; 12 | FUJ; 7 | SUZ; 4 | CHA; 12 | MOT; 15 | | 14th | 22 |
| 2018 | Lexus Team WedsSport BANDOH | Lexus LC 500 | GT500 | OKA; 9 | FUJ; 12 | SUZ; 13 | CHA; 3 | FUJ; 10 | SUG; Ret | AUT; 3 | MOT; 5 | | 11th | 32 |
| 2019 | Lexus Team WedsSport BANDOH | Lexus LC 500 | GT500 | OKA; 6‡ | FUJ; 13 | SUZ; 7 | CHA; 3 | FUJ; 9 | SUG; 8 | AUT; 13 | MOT; 7 | | 11th | 27.5 |
| 2020 | TGR Team WedsSport BANDOH | Toyota GR Supra GT500 | GT500 | FUJ; 9 | FUJ; 15 | SUZ; 10 | MOT; Ret | FUJ; 7 | SUZ; 9 | MOT; 11 | FUJ; 10 | | 17th | 10 |
| 2021 | TGR Team WedsSport BANDOH | Toyota GR Supra GT500 | GT500 | OKA; 12 | **FUJ**; 7 | MOT; 2 | SUZ; 13 | SUG; Ret | AUT; 13 | **MOT**; 2 | FUJ; 13 | | 11th | 36 |
| 2022 | TGR Team WedsSport BANDOH | Toyota GR Supra GT500 | GT500 | OKA; 13 | **FUJ**; 6 | **SUZ**; 5 | **FUJ**; 9 | SUZ; 7 | **SUG**; 15 | AUT; 5 | MOT; 7 | | 11th | 28.5 |
| 2023 | TGR Team WedsSport BANDOH | Toyota GR Supra GT500 | GT500 | OKA; 9 | FUJ; 12 | SUZ; 1 | FUJ; 12 | SUZ; 9 | SUG; 8 | AUT; 13 | MOT; 8 | | 12th | 30 |
| 2024 | TGR Team WedsSport BANDOH | Toyota GR Supra GT500 | GT500 | OKA; 13 | FUJ; 10 | SUZ; 12 | FUJ; 9 | SUZ; 8^{3} | SUG; Ret | AUT; 12 | MOT; 14 | | 15th | 6 |
| 2025 | TGR Team WedsSport BANDOH | Toyota GR Supra GT500 | GT500 | OKA; 12† | FUJ; 14 | **SEP**; 5 | FS1 (4) | FS2; 15 | SUZ; 14 | SUG; 10 | AUT; 5 | MOT; 11 | 15th | 18.5 |
| 2026 | TGR Team WedsSport BANDOH | Toyota GR Supra GT500 | GT500 | OKA; 12 | FUJ; 10 | FUJ; 10 | SUZ; 13 | SUG; 6 | AUT; 10 | MOT; 12 | MOT; 10 | | 15th | 9 |

^{‡} Half points awarded as less than 75% of race distance was completed.
^{(Number)} Driver did not take part in this sprint race, points are still awarded for the teammate's result.
^{*} Season still in progress.

=== Complete Formula Nippon/Super Formula results ===
(key) (Races in bold indicate pole position) (Races in italics indicate fastest lap)

| Year | Team | Engine | 1 | 2 | 3 | 4 | 5 | 6 | 7 | 8 | 9 | 10 | DC | Points |
|---|---|---|---|---|---|---|---|---|---|---|---|---|---|---|
| 2011 | Project μ/cerumo・INGING | Toyota | SUZ; 13 | AUT; 11 | FUJ; 15 | MOT; 12 | SUZ; C | SUG; 5 | MOT1; 4 | MOT2; DSQ | | | 10th | 6.5 |
| 2012 | Project μ/cerumo・INGING | Toyota | SUZ; 14 | MOT; 9 | AUT; 8 | FUJ; 8 | MOT; 10 | SUG; 13 | SUZ1; 11 | SUZ2; 12 | | | 13th | 2 |
| 2013 | P.mu/cerumo・INGING | Toyota | SUZ; 10 | AUT; 10 | FUJ; 7 | MOT; 6 | SUG; 4 | SUZ1; Ret | SUZ2; 15 | | | | 10th | 10 |
| 2014 | P.mu/cerumo・INGING | Toyota | SUZ; 13 | FUJ1; 5 | FUJ2; 7 | FUJ; 3 | MOT; 13 | AUT; 2 | SUG; 9 | SUZ1; 4 | SUZ2; Ret | | 7th | 19.5 |
| 2015 | P.mu/cerumo・INGING | Toyota | SUZ; 17 | OKA; Ret | FUJ; 4 | MOT; 18 | AUT; 8 | SUG; 17 | SUZ1; 7 | SUZ2; 8 | | | 9th | 7.5 |
| 2016 | P.mu/cerumo・INGING | Toyota | SUZ; 2 | OKA; 6 | FUJ; Ret | MOT; 4 | OKA1; 2 | OKA2; 1 | SUG; 15 | SUZ1; 1 | SUZ2; 6 | | 1st | 33 |
| 2017 | P.mu/cerumo・INGING | Toyota | SUZ; 3 | OKA1; 10 | OKA2; 9 | **FUJ**; Ret | MOT; 15 | AUT; 5 | SUG; 4 | SUZ1; C | SUZ2; C | | 8th | 16 |
| 2018 | JMS P.mu/cerumo・INGING | Toyota | SUZ1; 13 | AUT; C | SUG; Ret | FUJ; 3 | MOT; 15 | OKA; 8 | SUZ2; 4 | | | | 8th | 11.5 |
| 2019 | Kondō Racing | Toyota | SUZ1; 6 | AUT; 16 | SUG; 6 | FUJ; 16 | MOT; 10 | OKA; 16 | SUZ2; 15 | | | | 17th | 5 |
| 2020 | carrozzeria Team KCMG | Toyota | MOT; Ret | OKA; 7 | SUG; 5 | AUT; 4 | SUZ1; 3 | SUZ2; Ret | FUJ; 15 | | | | 9th | 29 |
| 2021 | carrozzeria Team KCMG | Toyota | FUJ; 8 | SUZ1; Ret | AUT; Ret | SUG; 13 | MOT1; 11 | MOT2; Ret | SUZ2; 15 | | | | 18th | 3 |
| 2022 | KCMG | Toyota | FUJ; 13 | FUJ; 15 | SUZ; 6 | AUT; 11 | SUG; 9 | FUJ; 8 | MOT; 15 | MOT; 12 | SUZ; 20 | SUZ; 18 | 16th | 10 |
| 2023 | Kids com KCMG | Toyota | FUJ; 12 | FUJ; 16 | SUZ; 16 | AUT; 10 | SUG; 9 | FUJ; 15 | MOT; 10 | SUZ; 16 | SUZ; 8 | | 17th | 7 |
| 2024 | Itochu Enex Team Impul | Toyota | SUZ1; Ret | AUT; 19† | SUG; 7 | FUJ; 6 | MOT; 11 | FUJ; 13 | FUJ; 15 | SUZ; 13 | SUZ; 12 | | 13th | 7 |

^{*} Season still in progress.

=== 24 Hours of Le Mans results ===
| Year | Team | Co-Drivers | Car | Class | Laps | Pos. | Class Pos. |
|---|---|---|---|---|---|---|---|
| 2017 | (Japan) Toyota Gazoo Racing | (Argentina) José María López (France) Nicolas Lapierre | Toyota TS050 Hybrid | LMP1 | 160 | DNF | DNF |

Sporting positions
| Preceded by Keisuke Kunimoto | Formula Challenge Japan; Champion; 2008 | Succeeded by Kazuki Miura |
| Preceded by Marcus Ericsson | Japanese Formula Three Champion; 2010 | Succeeded by Yuhi Sekiguchi |
| Preceded by Hiroaki Ishiura | Super Formula Champion; 2016 | Succeeded by Hiroaki Ishiura |
