= Hiroaki Ishiura =

Japanese racing driver

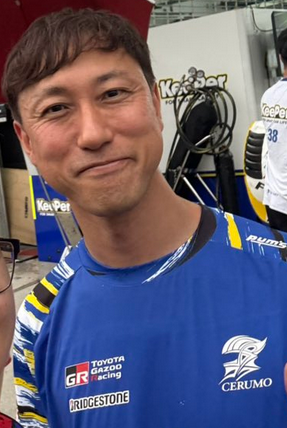
- Ishiura at the 2025 Super GT Malaysia Festival
- Nationality: (Japan) Japanese
- Born: April 23, 1981 (age 45) Tokyo, Japan

Super GT GT300 career
- Debut season: 2026
- Current team: Rookie Racing
- Categorisation: FIA Platinum
- Car number: 32
- Former teams: Tsuchiya, Kraft, SARD, Cerumo
- Starts: 105
- Wins: 6
- Poles: 4
- Best finish: 3rd in 2012

Previous series
- 2008-2025 2014-20 2008-11 2007 2006-07: Super GT GT500; Super Formula; Formula Nippon; Super GT GT300; All-Japan Formula Three

Championship titles
- 2015, 2017 2007: Super Formula; Super GT GT300

Hiroaki Ishiura (石浦 宏明, Ishiura Hiroaki; born April 23, 1981) is a Japanese racing driver from Tokyo. He currently drives in the Super GT series for Rookie Racing. He was the 2015 and 2017 Super Formula champion, and is known as a fast and strong driver.

Ishiura made his Super GT debut in 2006. In 2007, he won the GT300 championship, in the apr MR-S with Kazuya Oshima. In 2008, he started racing in the GT500 class as part of Team Tsuchiya. He went on to join Cerumo after driving for SARD. In 2025, he ended his 18-year run in the GT500 class, finishing third in his final race. However, he is not retiring.

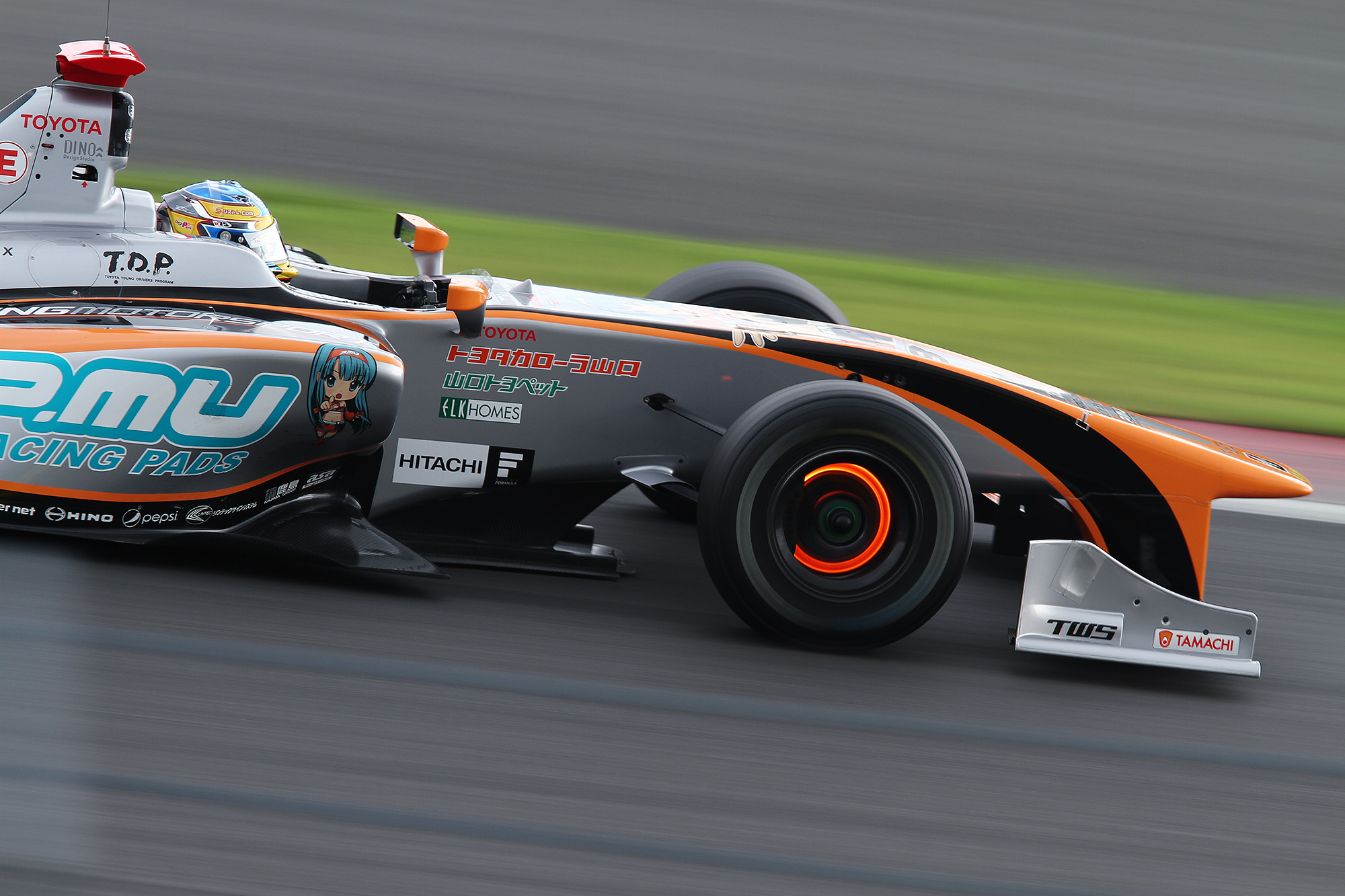
Hiroaki Ishiura in his Super Formula car in 2014

== Racing record ==
=== Complete Formula Nippon/Super Formula results ===
(key) (Races in bold indicate pole position) (Races in italics indicate fastest lap)

| Year | Team | Engine | 1 | 2 | 3 | 4 | 5 | 6 | 7 | 8 | 9 | 10 | 11 | DC | Points |
|---|---|---|---|---|---|---|---|---|---|---|---|---|---|---|---|
| 2008 | Team LeMans | Toyota | FUJ; 7 | SUZ; 13 | MOT; 8 | OKA; Ret | SUZ; 14 | SUZ; Ret | MOT; 13 | MOT; 8 | FUJ; 17 | FUJ; 16 | SUG; 9 | 16th | 9 |
| 2009 | Team LeMans | Toyota | FUJ; 11 | SUZ; 8 | MOT; 3 | FUJ; 4 | SUZ; 4 | MOT; 4 | AUT; 5 | SUG; 5 | | | | 6th | 30 |
| 2010 | Team LeMans | Toyota | SUZ; 10 | MOT; Ret | FUJ; 6 | MOT; 8 | SUG; 4 | AUT; 3 | SUZ; 7 | SUZ; 10 | | | | 8th | 16 |
| 2011 | Team Kygnus Sunoco | Toyota | SUZ; 8 | AUT; 10 | FUJ; 6 | MOT; 7 | SUZ; C | SUG; 2 | MOT; 6 | MOT; 6 | | | | 6th | 17 |
| 2014 | P.mu/cerumo・INGING | Toyota | SUZ; 3 | FUJ; Ret | FUJ; 11 | FUJ; 4 | MOT; 2 | AUT; 8 | SUG; 6 | SUZ; 5 | SUZ; 7 | | | 5th | 26 |
| 2015 | P.mu/cerumo・INGING | Toyota | SUZ; 5 | **OKA**; 1 | FUJ; 3 | **MOT**; 1 | **AUT**; 2 | SUG; 5 | SUZ; 2 | SUZ; 4 | | | | 1st | 51.5 |
| 2016 | P.mu/cerumo・INGING | Toyota | SUZ; 11 | **OKA**; 1 | FUJ; 6 | MOT; 3 | OKA1; 7 | OKA2; 3 | SUG; 16 | **SUZ**; 3 | **SUZ**; 3 | | | 5th | 27 |
| 2017 | P.mu/cerumo・INGING | Toyota | SUZ; 4 | OKA; 8 | **OKA**; 2 | FUJ; 1 | MOT; 4 | AUT; 4 | SUG; 6 | SUZ; C | SUZ; C | | | 1st | 33.5 |
| 2018 | JMS P.mu/cerumo・INGING | Toyota | SUZ; 4 | AUT; C | SUZ; 11 | FUJ; 2 | **MOT**; 1 | OKA; 7 | SUZ; 11 | | | | | 3rd | 25 |
| 2019 | JMS P.mu/cerumo・INGING | Toyota | SUZ; Ret | AUT; 9 | SUG; 7 | FUJ; 7 | MOT; 6 | OKA; Ret | SUZ; 6 | | | | | 13th | 10 |
| 2020 | JMS P.mu/cerumo・INGING | Toyota | MOT; 8 | OKA; 2 | SUG; 8 | AUT; 13 | SUZ; 6 | SUZ; 10 | FUJ; 12 | | | | | 10th | 27 |

=== Complete Super GT results ===
| Year | Team | Car | Class | 1 | 2 | 3 | 4 | 5 | 6 | 7 | 8 | 9 | DC | Pts |
|---|---|---|---|---|---|---|---|---|---|---|---|---|---|---|
| 2006 | DHG Racing | Ford GT | GT300 | SUZ | OKA | FUJ | SEP | SUG | SUZ; Ret | MOT | AUT | FUJ | NC | 0 |
| 2007 | apr | Toyota MR-S | GT300 | SUZ; 3 | OKA; 1 | FUJ; 3 | SEP; 1 | SUG; 15 | SUZ; 14 | MOT; 21 | AUT; 9 | FUJ; 2 | **1st** | **89** |
| 2008 | Team Tsuchiya | Lexus SC430 | GT500 | SUZ; 11 | OKA; 11 | FUJ; 8 | SEP; 4 | SUG; 4 | SUZ; 14 | MOT; 10 | AUT; 12 | FUJ; 8 | 15th | 23 |
| 2009 | Lexus Team Kraft | Lexus SC430 | GT500 | OKA; 9 | SUZ; 7 | FUJ; 5 | SEP; 9 | SUG; 12 | SUZ; 1 | FUJ; 7 | AUT; 7 | MOT; 9 | 9th | 44 |
| 2010 | Lexus Team Kraft | Lexus SC430 | GT500 | SUZ; 6 | OKA; 9 | FUJ; 1 | SEP; 7 | SUG; Ret | SUZ; 5 | FUJ; C | MOT; 4 | | 6th | 45 |
| 2011 | Lexus Team SARD | Lexus SC430 | GT500 | OKA; 13 | FUJ; 6 | SEP; 13 | SUG; 2 | SUZ; 5 | FUJ; 8 | AUT; 15 | MOT; 3 | | 7th | 40 |
| 2012 | Lexus Team SARD | Lexus SC430 | GT500 | OKA; 9 | FUJ; 1 | SEP; 4 | SUG; 4 | SUZ; Ret | FUJ; 6 | AUT; 5 | MOT; 5 | | **3rd** | **57** |
| 2013 | Lexus Team SARD | Lexus SC430 | GT500 | OKA; 8 | FUJ; 4 | SEP; 2 | SUG; 4 | SUZ; 9 | FUJ; 11 | AUT; 7 | MOT; 4 | | 7th | 49 |
| 2014 | Lexus Team SARD | Lexus RC F | GT500 | OKA; 4 | FUJ; 6 | AUT; 11 | SUG; 6 | FUJ; 12 | SUZ; 11 | BUR; 7 | MOT; 9 | | 13th | 24 |
| 2015 | Lexus Team Zent Cerumo | Lexus RC F | GT500 | OKA; 3 | FUJ; Ret | **CHA**; Ret | **FUJ**; 2 | SUZ; 2 | SUG; 10 | AUT; 4 | MOT; 5 | | 4th | 59 |
| 2016 | Lexus Team Cerumo | Lexus RC F | GT500 | OKA; 6 | FUJ; 14 | SUG; 3 | FUJ; 7 | SUZ; 1 | CHA; 15 | **MOT**; 6 | **MOT**; 9 | | 6th | 52 |
| 2017 | Lexus Team Cerumo | Lexus LC500 | GT500 | OKA; 4 | FUJ; 1 | AUT; 10 | SUG; 13 | SUZ; 3 | FUJ; 10 | CHA; 4 | MOT; 3 | | 4th | 62 |
| 2018 | Lexus Team ZENT Cerumo | Lexus LC500 | GT500 | OKA; 8 | FUJ; 3 | SUZ; 8 | CHA; 4 | FUJ; 8 | SUG; 8 | AUT; 4 | MOT; 2 | | 4th | 59 |
| 2019 | Lexus Team ZENT Cerumo | Lexus LC500 | GT500 | OKA; 8 | FUJ; 1 | SUZ; 6 | CHA; 7 | FUJ; Ret | AUT; 4 | SUG; 11 | MOT; 4 | | 4th | 46.5 |
| 2020 | TGR Team ZENT Cerumo | Toyota GR Supra | GT500 | FUJ; 4 | FUJ; 7 | SUZ; Ret | MOT; 2 | FUJ; 9 | SUZ; 5 | MOT; 10 | FUJ; 8 | | 10th | 40 |
| 2021 | TGR Team ZENT Cerumo | Toyota GR Supra GT500 | GT500 | OKA; 6 | FUJ; Ret | MOT; 8 | SUZ; 8 | SUG; Ret | AUT; 2 | MOT; 9 | FUJ; 5 | | 12th | 34 |
| 2022 | TGR Team ZENT Cerumo | Toyota GR Supra GT500 | GT500 | OKA; 4 | FUJ; 12 | SUZ; Ret | FUJ; Ret | SUZ; Ret | SUG; 4 | AUT; Ret | MOT; 10 | | 14th | 16.5 |
| 2023 | TGR Team ZENT Cerumo | Toyota GR Supra GT500 | GT500 | OKA; 5 | FUJ; 13 | SUZ; 10 | FUJ; 5 | SUZ; 6 | SUG; Ret | AUT; 4 | MOT; 11 | | 13th | 26 |
| 2024 | TGR Team KeePer Cerumo | Toyota GR Supra GT500 | GT500 | OKA; 4 | FUJ; 5 | SUZ; Ret | FUJ; 3 | **SUZ**; **2^{1}** | SUG; 10 | AUT; 3 | MOT; 9 | | 4th | 54 |
| 2025 | TGR Team KeePer Cerumo | Toyota GR Supra GT500 | GT500 | OKA; Ret | **FUJ**; **1** | SEP; 8 | FS1; 2 | FS2 (3) | SUZ; 5 | SUG; 11 | AUT; 4 | **MOT**; 7 | 3rd | 56 |
| 2026 | Team ENEOS Rookie | Mercedes-AMG GT3 Evo | GT300 | OKA; 16 | FUJ; 6 | FUJ; 2 | SUZ; 10 | SUG; Ret | AUT; 10 | | | | 15th | 42 |
| 2026 | Team ENEOS Rookie | Toyota GR GT3 | GT300 | | | | | | | MOT; 19 | MOT; 24 | | 15th | 42 |

^{‡} Half points awarded as less than 75% of race distance was completed.
^{(Number)} Driver did not take part in this sprint race, points are still awarded for the teammate's result.
^{*} Season still in progress.

Sporting positions
| Preceded by Kazuki Nakajima | Super Formula Champion; 2015 | Succeeded by Yuji Kunimoto |
| Preceded by Yuji Kunimoto | Super Formula Champion; 2017 | Succeeded by Naoki Yamamoto |
