= Inging Motorsport =

Japanese racing team

Inging
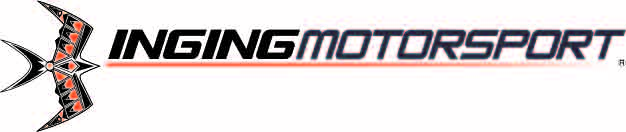
- Founded: 1997
- Base: Oyama, Shizuoka Prefecture
- Current series: Super GT; Super Formula; Kyojo Cup
- Current drivers: Super Formula: Sena Sakaguchi; Toshiki Oyu; Super GT - GT300: Yuui Tsutsumi; Kazuhisa Urabe
- Teams' Championships: Super Formula: 2016 2017
- Drivers' Championships: Super Formula: Hiroaki Ishiura (2015, 2017); Yuji Kunimoto (2016); Japanese Formula 3 Championship; Ronnie Quintarelli (2004)
- Website: inging.co.jp

Inging Co., Ltd. (株式会社インギング, Kabushiki gaisha Inging) (stylised as INGING) is a Japanese racing team headquartered in Oyama, Shizuoka Prefecture. The competed in Super Formula together with Cerumo, and participated in Super GT GT300 Class.

== History ==
=== Super Formula ===
INGING has raced since 1998 where the series named Formula Nippon. For 2008 INGING & Cerumo work together to run as a team only to race in this series. The team has run with Roberto Streit, Yuji Tachikawa and Takuto Iguchi. In 2011, Project mu joined the team as the main sponsor for the team. Their success was during the Dallara SF14 era where Hiroaki Ishiura and Yuji Kunimoto won the drivers title from 2015 to 2017, with Ishiura won in 2015 & 2017 and Kunimoto in 2016. The team also won constructor champion in 2016 and 2017. Sho Tsuboi replaces Kunimoto in 2019. And he clinched third place in 2020 in which the highest position he achieved in the series to date. Hiroaki Ishiura stepped down from racing in Super Formula, and he worked with Yuji Tachikawa. His replacement was Sena Sakaguchi. For 2023, INGING acquired a new title sponsor in finance advisory firm Vertex Partners, with the team now named Vertex Partners Cerumo・INGING. Toshiki Oyu joined Toyota and drive for INGING, replacing Sho Tsuboi who moves to TOM'S.

=== Super GT GT300 ===
INGING Motorsport and Cars Tokai Dream28 merged into a collaborative entry in 2021, known as muta Racing INGING. The team retained the Lotus Evora MC GT300 vehicle, driver Hiroki Katoh, chief engineer Shintaro Watanabe, and the number 2 plate of Cars Tokai Dream28's entry. INGING brought on their Bridgestone tyre contract, title sponsor muta, and driver Ryohei Sakaguchi. muta Racing INGING announced that they will also field the new Toyota GR86 GT, replacing their previous Lotus Evora MC. In 2023, Hiroki Katoh was appointed as the new team director and shifted to a part-time driving role as the team's third driver & Hibiki Taira comes to do fulltime with Tsutsumi. In that season the team clinced second in the standings for both Tsutsumi & Taira.
