= Cerumo =

Japanese racing team

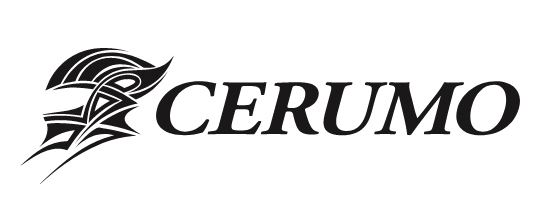
- Founded: 1991
- Base: Oyama, Shizuoka Prefecture
- Team principal(s): Yuji Tachikawa
- Founder(s): Masayuki Sato
- Current series: Super GT; Super Formula; Kyojo Cup
- Current drivers: Super Formula: Toshiki Oyu; Sena Sakaguchi; Super GT - GT500: Toshiki Oyu; Rikuto Kobayashi
- Teams' Championships: Super Formula: 2016 2017; Super GT GT500: 2003; 2005; 2013
- Drivers' Championships: Super Formula: Hiroaki Ishiura (2015, 2017); Yuji Kunimoto (2017); Super GT GT500: Yuji Tachikawa (2003, 2005, 2013); Hironori Takeuchi (2003); Toranosuke Takagi (2005); Kohei Hirate (2013)
- Website: cerumo.co.jp

Cerumo Co., Ltd. (stylized as CERUMO) is a Japanese racing team headquartered in Oyama, Shizuoka Prefecture. The team competed in Super Formula together with INGING Motorsport, and participated in Super GT GT500 Class. In January 2016, former Bridgestone Scuderia Ferrari engineer Hirohide Hamashima joined the team and became general manager in both the Super GT and Super Formula categories. At the shareholders' meeting in February 2019, founder Masayuki Sato resigned as president, and Hamashima also resigned as general manager. In his place, Haruhisa Urabe will become president and chairman, and Hiroaki Ishiura will become a director. After that Yuji Tachikawa picked as the director.

== History ==
The founder, Masayuki Sato, is a famous engineer known as "Bate-san" in the domestic racing world. As Tadashi Sakai's chief mechanic, he was in charge of machines such as the Fuji GC, and in 1981 he took over Sakai Engineering and established Cerumo. The company name is derived from the Italian word for steady. While operating as a maintenance garage, then formed the team in 1991. Since then, he has competed in SUPER GT (formerly All Japan GT Championship JGTC) and Formula Nippon then the current Super Formula.

=== Super Formula ===
At the end of 2007, Haruhisa Urabe, the owner of INGING, became the new owner, and the integration of INGING and the factory is underway. The team has run with Roberto Streit, Yuji Tachikawa, Takuto Iguchi. In 2011 Project mu joined the team as the main sponsor for the team. Their success was during the Dallara SF14 era where Hiroaki Ishiura and Yuji Kunimoto won the drivers title from 2015 to 2017, with Ishiura won in 2015 & 2017 and Kunimoto in 2016. The team also won constructor champion in 2016 & 2017. Sho Tsuboi replaces Kunimoto in 2019. And he clinched third place in 2020 in which the highest position he achieved in the series to date. Hiroaki Ishiura stepped down from racing in Super Formula, and he worked with Tachikawa. His replacement was Sena Sakaguchi. For 2023, INGING acquired a new title sponsor in finance advisory firm Vertex Partners, with the team now named Vertex Partners Cerumo・INGING. Toshiki Oyu joined Toyota and drive for INGING, replacing Sho Tsuboi who moves to TOM'S.

=== Super GT GT500 ===
Cerumo has competed in the All Japan GT Championship (JGTC) since 1995 and in SUPER GT since 2005, winning the Driver's Championship three times in 2001, 2005, and 2013 which Yuji Tachikawa won it all, with Hironori Takeuchi, Toranosuke Takagi, and Kohei Hirate each won respectively. Cerumo participating in SUPER GT under the entrant name "TGR Team ZENT Cerumo" from 2020, but already with sponsorship from the pachinko and amusement chain ZENT since 2009. The director was Takeuchi in 2008 and 2009, Takagi from 2010 to 2017, Hirohide Hamashima in 2018, and Tachikawa has been appointed general director since 2019. In 2021, Junichi Murata will remain the general manager of Tachikawa and become the team manager. Kotaro Tanaka will lead the team in 2022, and Junichi Murata will lead the team again from 2023. Tachikawa retired from the series after the 2023 season and he returns to the team as team director. Tachikawa's replacement at Cerumo will be Toshiki Oyu who moves from Honda. Cerumo's long time sponsor ZENT will not be the main sponsor and KeePer will replace it.

== Racing results ==
=== Complete JGTC results ===
Source: (key) (Races in bold indicate pole position) (Races in italics indicate fastest lap)

Year	Car	Tyres	Class	No.	Drivers	1	2	3	4	5	6	7	8	Pos	Pts
1995	Toyota Supra	B	GT1	38	(France) Érik Comas	SUZ; 5	**FUJ**; 14	SEN; 15	FUJ; Ret	SUG; 11	MIN; DSQ			12th	8
1996	Toyota Supra	B	GT500	37	(France) Érik Comas (Japan) Hidetoshi Mitsusada (Japan) Hironori Takeuchi	SUZ; 16	FUJ; 4	SEN; 1	FUJ; Ret	SUG; 4	MIN; 2			**2nd**	**68**
1997	Toyota Supra	B	GT500	38	(Japan) Hironori Takeuchi (Japan) Katsutomo Kaneishi	SUZ; 4	FUJ; 9	SEN; 4	FUJ; 8	MIN; 5	SUG; 10			**1st**	79
1997	Toyota Supra	B	GT500	510	(France) Bertrand Gachot (France) Paul Belmondo	SUZ	FUJ	SEN; 8	FUJ; 5	MIN; Ret	SUG; 11			9th	11
1998	Toyota Supra	B	GT500	38	(Japan) Hironori Takeuchi (Japan) Takayuki Kinoshita	SUZ; 9	FUJ; C	SEN; Ret	FUJ; Ret	MOT; 5	MIN; 12	SUG; 3		9th	22
1999	Toyota Supra	B	GT500	32	(Japan) Masahiko Kondo (Japan) Takayuki Kinoshita	SUZ; 8	FUJ; 6	SUG; 8	MIN; Ret	FUJ; Ret	OKA; 11	MOT; 15		11th	12
1999	Toyota Supra	B	GT500	38	(Japan) Hironori Takeuchi (Japan) Yuji Tachikawa	SUZ; 7	**FUJ**; 2	SUG; Ret	MIN; 8	FUJ; 6	OKA; 8	MOT; 12		8th	31
2000	Toyota Supra	B	GT500	32	(Japan) Masahiko Kondo (Japan) Takayuki Kinoshita	MOT; 11	FUJ; Ret	SUG; 16	FUJ; 19	OKA; 13	MIN; Ret	SUZ; 10		15th	1
2000	Toyota Supra	B	GT500	38	(Japan) Hironori Takeuchi (Japan) Yuji Tachikawa	MOT; 4	FUJ; 3	SUG; 12	**FUJ**; Ret	**OKA**; 1	MIN; 6	SUZ; 11		5th	48
2001	Toyota Supra	B	GT500	33	(Japan) Masahiko Kondo (Japan) Ukyo Katayama (Japan) Shigekazu Wakisaka	OKA; 12	FUJ; 14	SUG; 13	**FUJ**; 14	MOT; 9	SUZ; Ret	MIN; 13		**3rd**	**58**
2001	Toyota Supra	B	GT500	38	(Japan) Hironori Takeuchi (Japan) Yuji Tachikawa	OKA; Ret	FUJ; 2	SUG; 3	FUJ; 4	MOT; 2	SUZ; 6	MIN; 16		**3rd**	**58**
2002	Toyota Supra	B	GT500	1	(Japan) Hironori Takeuchi (Japan) Yuji Tachikawa	OKA; 4	FUJ; 1	SUG; 17	SEP; 9	**FUJ**; 1	MOT; 13	MIN; 9	SUZ; 6	4th	69
2002	Toyota Supra	B	GT500	33	(Japan) Masahiko Kondo (Japan) Ukyo Katayama (Japan) Hayanari Shimoda	OKA; 15	FUJ	SUG; 9	SEP; 7	FUJ; 16	MOT; 12	MIN; 11	SUZ; 13	4th	69
2003	Toyota Supra	B	GT500	38	(Japan) Hironori Takeuchi (Japan) Yuji Tachikawa	OKA; DNS	FUJ; DSQ	SUG; 10	**FUJ**; 3	**FUJ**; 3	MOT; 9	**AUT**; 3	SUZ; 13	7th	64
2004	Toyota Supra	B	GT500	38	(Japan) Seiji Ara (Japan) Yuji Tachikawa	OKA; 5	SUG; 1	SEP; 7	TOK; 14	MOT; 10	**AUT**; 11	SUZ; 4		6th	45
2004	Toyota Celica	D	GT300	52	(Japan) Hironori Takeuchi (Japan) Seigo Nishizawa	OKA; 17	SUG; 20	SEP; 8	TOK; 23	MOT; 8	AUT; 18	SUZ; 9		13th	9

Note: in 1996 and 1997 Cerumo and TOM's entered the Team's Championship together under the Toyota Castrol Team banner.

=== Complete Super GT Results ===
(key) (Races in bold indicate pole position) (Races in italics indicate fastest lap)

Year	Car	Tyres	Class	No.	Drivers	1	2	3	4	5	6	7	8	9	Pos	Points
2005	Toyota Supra	B	GT500	38	(Japan) Toranosuke Takagi (Japan) Yuji Tachikawa	OKA; 14	**FUJ**; 1	SEP; 11	SUG; 11	MOT; 12	FUJ; 1	AUT; 7	**SUZ**; 1		4th	67
2005	Toyota Celica	K	GT300	52	(Japan) Hironori Takeuchi (Japan) Katsuyuki Hiranaka	OKA; 11	FUJ; 14	SEP; 12	SUG; 8	MOT; 14	FUJ; Ret	AUT; 8	SUZ; 18		12th	7
2006	Lexus SC430	B	GT500	1	(Japan) Toranosuke Takagi (Japan) Yuji Tachikawa (Italy) Ronnie Quintarelli	SUZ; 5	OKA; 5	**FUJ**; Ret	SEP; 12	**SUG**; 1	SUZ; 7	MOT; 3	AUT; 5	FUJ; Ret	7th	58
2006	Toyota Celica	K	GT300	52	(Japan) Hironori Takeuchi (Japan) Koki Saga (Japan) Keita Sawa	SUZ; 11	OKA; 12	FUJ; 12	SEP	SUG; 11	**SUZ**; 1	MOT; Ret	AUT; 13	FUJ; 21	13th	25
2007	Lexus SC430	B	GT500	38	(Japan) Toranosuke Takagi (Japan) Yuji Tachikawa	SUZ; 1	OKA; 11	FUJ; 6	SEP; 4	SUG; 11	SUZ; 7	MOT; 14	**AUT**; Ret	FUJ; 4	7th	61
2008	Lexus SC430	B	GT500	38	(Japan) Yuji Tachikawa (United Kingdom) Richard Lyons	SUZ; 4	OKA; 7	FUJ; 1	SEP; Ret	SUG; 3	SUZ; 9	MOT; 9	AUT; 4	FUJ; 2	**2nd**	**93**
2009	Lexus SC430	B	GT500	38	(Japan) Yuji Tachikawa (United Kingdom) Richard Lyons	**OKA**; 6	SUZ; 1	FUJ; 9	SEP; 10	SUG; 10	SUZ; 3	FUJ; 10	**AUT**; 11	MOT; 13	9th	63
2010	Lexus SC430	B	GT500	38	(Japan) Yuji Tachikawa (United Kingdom) Richard Lyons	SUZ; 9	OKA; 2	FUJ; 4	SEP; 6	SUG; 9	SUZ; 6	FUJ; C	MOT; Ret		9th	52
2011	Lexus SC430	B	GT500	38	(Japan) Yuji Tachikawa (Japan) Kohei Hirate	OKA; 5	FUJ; 8	SEP; 5	SUG; 11	SUZ; 14	FUJ; 1	AUT; 3	MOT; 10		6th	68
2012	Lexus SC430	B	GT500	38	(Japan) Yuji Tachikawa (Japan) Kohei Hirate	**OKA**; 1	FUJ; 8	SEP; 2	SUG; 5	SUZ; 9	FUJ; 8	AUT; 7	**MOT**; 1		2nd	95
2013	Lexus SC430	B	GT500	38	(Japan) Yuji Tachikawa (Japan) Kohei Hirate	OKA; 4	FUJ; 2	SEP; 14	SUG; 11	SUZ; 11	**FUJ**; 1	**AUT**; 2	MOT; 3		1st	89
2014	Lexus RC F	B	GT500	1	(Japan) Yuji Tachikawa (Japan) Kohei Hirate	OKA; 14	FUJ; 2	AUT; 12	SUG; 1	FUJ; 14	SUZ; 8	BUR; 11	MOT; 7		7th	61
2015	Lexus RC F	B	GT500	38	(Japan) Yuji Tachikawa (Japan) Hiroaki Ishiura	OKA; 3	FUJ; Ret	**CHA**; Ret	**FUJ**; 2	SUZ; 2	SUG; 10	AUT; 4	MOT; 5		5th	75
2016	Lexus RC F	B	GT500	38	(Japan) Yuji Tachikawa (Japan) Hiroaki Ishiura	OKA; 6	FUJ; 14	SUG; 3	FUJ; 7	SUZ; 1	CHA; 15	MOT; 6	MOT; 9		6th	72
2017	Lexus LC500 GT500	B	GT500	38	(Japan) Yuji Tachikawa (Japan) Hiroaki Ishiura	OKA; 4	**FUJ**; 1	AUT; 10	SUG; 13	FUJ; 3	SUZ; 10	CHA; 4	MOT; 3		4th	81
2018	Lexus LC500 GT500	B	GT500	38	(Japan) Yuji Tachikawa (Japan) Hiroaki Ishiura	OKA; 8	**FUJ**; 3	SUZ; 8	CHA; 4	FUJ; 8	SUG; 5	AUT; 4	MOT; 2		4th	82
2019	Lexus LC500 GT500	B	GT500	38	(Japan) Yuji Tachikawa (Japan) Hiroaki Ishiura	OKA; 8	FUJ; 1	SUZ; 6	BUR; 7	FUJ; Ret	AUT; 4	SUG; 11	MOT; 4		4th	65.5
2020	Toyota GR Supra GT500	B	GT500	14	(Japan) Kazuya Oshima (Japan) Sho Tsuboi	FUJ; 3	FUJ; 3	SUZ; 9	MOT; 4	FUJ; 2	SUZ; 12	MOT; 12	FUJ; Ret		6th	68
2020	Toyota GR Supra GT500	B	GT500	38	(Japan) Yuji Tachikawa (Japan) Hiroaki Ishiura	FUJ; 4	FUJ; 7	SUZ; Ret	**MOT**; 2	FUJ; 9	SUZ; 5	MOT; 10	FUJ; 8		9th	60
2021	Toyota GR Supra GT500	B	GT500	38	(Japan) Yuji Tachikawa (Japan) Hiroaki Ishiura	OKA; 6	FUJ; Ret	MOT; 8	SUZ; 8	SUG; Ret	AUT; 2	MOT; 9	FUJ; 5		12th	52
2022	Toyota GR Supra GT500	B	GT500	38	(Japan) Yuji Tachikawa (Japan) Hiroaki Ishiura	OKA; 4	FUJ; 12	SUZ; Ret	FUJ; Ret	SUZ; 15	SUG; 4	AUT; 15	MOT; 10		14th	29.5
2023	Toyota GR Supra GT500	B	GT500	38	(Japan) Yuji Tachikawa (Japan) Hiroaki Ishiura	OKA; 5	FUJ; 13	SUZ; 10	FUJ; 5	SUZ; 6	SUG; Ret	AUT; 4	MOT; 11		12th	46
2024	Toyota GR Supra GT500	B	GT500	38	(Japan) Hiroaki Ishiura (Japan) Toshiki Oyu	OKA; 4	FUJ; 5	SUZ; Ret	FUJ; 3	**SUG**; 2	AUT; 10	MOT; 3	SUZ; 9		4th	75
2025	Toyota GR Supra GT500	B	GT500	38	(Japan) Hiroaki Ishiura (Japan) Toshiki Oyu	OKA; Ret	**FUJ**; 1	SEP; 8	FS1; 2	FS2; 3	SUZ; 5	SUG; 11	AUT; 4	**MOT**; 7	5th	75

^{‡} Half points awarded as less than 75% of race distance was completed. * Season still in progress.
