= 2016 Super Formula Championship =

Formula racing season

The 2016 Japanese Super Formula Championship was the forty-fourth season of premier Japanese open-wheel motor racing, and the fourth under the name of Super Formula. Hiroaki Ishiura started his 2015 Championship defense when the season began on 24 April, and ended after seven rounds on 30 October.

The series changed tyre supplier from Bridgestone to Yokohama.

== Teams and drivers ==
All teams were Japanese-registered and used the Dallara SF14 spec-racer chassis. Eight cars were powered by Honda's HR-414E engine, with the other 11 cars using Toyota's RI4A engine.

Team	No.	Driver	Engine	Rounds
(Japan) P.mu/cerumo・INGING	1	(Japan) Hiroaki Ishiura	Toyota RI4A	All
(Japan) P.mu/cerumo・INGING	2	(Japan) Yuji Kunimoto	Toyota RI4A	All
(Japan) Kondō Racing	3	(United Kingdom) James Rossiter	Toyota RI4A	All
(Japan) Kondō Racing	4	(United Kingdom) William Buller	Toyota RI4A	All
(Japan) SUNOCO Team LeMans	7	(India) Narain Karthikeyan	Toyota RI4A	All
(Japan) SUNOCO Team LeMans	8	(Japan) Kamui Kobayashi	Toyota RI4A	All
(Japan) Real Racing	10	(Japan) Koudai Tsukakoshi	Honda HR-414E	All
(Japan) Real Racing	11	(Japan) Takuya Izawa	Honda HR-414E	All
(Japan) Team Mugen	16	(Japan) Naoki Yamamoto	Honda HR-414E	All
(Hong Kong) KCMG	18	(Japan) Yuichi Nakayama	Toyota RI4A	All
(Japan) ITOCHU ENEX Team Impul	19	(Brazil) João Paulo de Oliveira	Toyota RI4A	All
(Japan) ITOCHU ENEX Team Impul	20	(Japan) Yuhi Sekiguchi	Toyota RI4A	All
(Japan) Drago Corse	34	(Japan) Takashi Kogure	Honda HR-414E	All
(Japan) Vantelin Team TOM'S	36	(Germany) André Lotterer	Toyota RI4A	All
(Japan) Vantelin Team TOM'S	37	(Japan) Kazuki Nakajima	Toyota RI4A	All
(Japan) Docomo Team Dandelion Racing	40	(Japan) Tomoki Nojiri	Honda HR-414E	All
(Japan) Docomo Team Dandelion Racing	41	(Belgium) Stoffel Vandoorne	Honda HR-414E	All
(Japan) Nakajima Racing	64	(Japan) Daisuke Nakajima	Honda HR-414E	All
(Japan) Nakajima Racing	65	(Belgium) Bertrand Baguette	Honda HR-414E	All

== Race calendar and results ==
A provisional calendar for the 2016 season was released on 10 December 2015. The 7 rounds of the 2016 Super-Formula Championship were held over 7 months from April through October, with a 7 week long summer hiatus through June to mid-July. All events were held on premier, natural terrain road racing circuits in Japan. Thus far, no events on the Super Formula calendar have been held on super-speedway ovals or on city street circuits.

The Autopolis round was cancelled on May 29 due to damage caused by the Kumamoto earthquake. However, on July 15, it was decided that Okayama would take its place at the same date, holding a double-header round.

Round		Circuit	Date	Pole position	Fastest lap	Winning driver	Winning team
1		Suzuka Circuit	24 April	(Japan) Naoki Yamamoto	(Japan) Yuhi Sekiguchi	(Japan) Naoki Yamamoto	Team Mugen
2		Okayama International Circuit	29 May	(Japan) Hiroaki Ishiura	(Japan) Kamui Kobayashi	(Japan) Hiroaki Ishiura	P.mu/cerumo・INGING
3		Fuji Speedway	17 July	(Belgium) Stoffel Vandoorne	(Japan) Kazuki Nakajima	(Brazil) João Paulo de Oliveira	ITOCHU ENEX Team Impul
4		Twin Ring Motegi	21 August	(Japan) Yuhi Sekiguchi	(Japan) Kamui Kobayashi	(Japan) Yuhi Sekiguchi	ITOCHU ENEX Team Impul
5	R1	Okayama International Circuit	10 September	(Japan) Kazuki Nakajima	(Japan) Kazuki Nakajima	(Belgium) Stoffel Vandoorne	Docomo Team Dandelion Racing
5	R2	Okayama International Circuit	11 September	(Japan) Tomoki Nojiri	(Japan) Hiroaki Ishiura	(Japan) Yuji Kunimoto	P.mu/cerumo・INGING
6		Sportsland SUGO	25 September	(Japan) Yuhi Sekiguchi	(Japan) Yuhi Sekiguchi	(Japan) Yuhi Sekiguchi	ITOCHU ENEX Team Impul
7	R1	Suzuka Circuit	30 October	(Japan) Hiroaki Ishiura	(Germany) André Lotterer	(Japan) Yuji Kunimoto	P.mu/cerumo・INGING
7	R2	Suzuka Circuit	30 October	(Japan) Hiroaki Ishiura	(India) Narain Karthikeyan	(Belgium) Stoffel Vandoorne	Docomo Team Dandelion Racing

== Championship standings ==
=== Drivers' Championship ===
Scoring system

	1	2	3	4	5	6	7	8	**Pole**
Rounds 1–4, 6	10	8	6	5	4	3	2	1	1
Round 5	5	4	3	2.5	2	1.5	1	0.5	1
Round 7	8	4	3	2.5	2	1.5	1	0.5	1

Driver standings

Pos	Driver	SUZ	OKA	FUJ	MOT	OKA		SUG	SUZ		Points
1	(Japan) Yuji Kunimoto	2	6	Ret	4	2	1	15	1	6	33
2	(Germany) André Lotterer	7	8	4	2	12	4	5	2	2	30
3	(Japan) Yuhi Sekiguchi	14	13	3	**1**	13	9	**1**	18	8	28.5
4	(Belgium) Stoffel Vandoorne	3	12	**Ret**	6	1	7	6	17	1	27
5	(Japan) Hiroaki Ishiura	11	**1**	6	3	7	3	16	**3**	**3**	27
6	(Japan) Kazuki Nakajima	12	17	2	7	**19**	2	4	5	16	22
7	(Brazil) João Paulo de Oliveira	10	19	1	Ret	8	5	Ret	8	4	15.5
8	(Japan) Naoki Yamamoto	**1**	5	Ret	8	10	6	14	19	Ret	15.5
9	(Japan) Tomoki Nojiri	9	4	13	Ret	4	**16**	3	4	Ret	14.5
10	(United Kingdom) James Rossiter	6	9	5	5	9	10	8	12	15	12
11	(Japan) Koudai Tsukakoshi	5	2	8	12	5	11	11	11	12	11
12	(Japan) Daisuke Nakajima	Ret	7	DNS	10	6	12	2	10	10	10.5
13	(Japan) Takashi Kogure	4	15	12	11	11	14	7	7	9	8
14	(India) Narain Karthikeyan	Ret	16	7	Ret	3	Ret	12	15	14	5
15	(Belgium) Bertrand Baguette	8	14	14	Ret	14	18	9	6	5	4.5
16	(Japan) Takuya Izawa	Ret	3	11	14	16	8	13	16	Ret	3.5
17	(Japan) Kamui Kobayashi	16	18	10	9	18	17	17	9	7	1
18	(Japan) Yuichi Nakayama	13	10	9	15	17	13	Ret	14	11	0
19	(United Kingdom) William Buller	15	11	Ret	13	15	15	10	13	13	0
Pos	Driver	SUZ	OKA	FUJ	MOT	OKA		SUG	SUZ		Points

Colour	Result
Gold	Winner
Silver	Second place
Bronze	Third place
Green	Points classification
Blue	Non-points classification
Blue	Non-classified finish (NC)
Purple	Retired, not classified (Ret)
Red	Did not qualify (DNQ)
Red	Did not pre-qualify (DNPQ)
Black	Disqualified (DSQ)
White	Did not start (DNS)
White	Withdrew (WD)
White	Race cancelled (C)
Blank	Did not practice (DNP)
Blank	Did not arrive (DNA)
Blank	Excluded (EX)

**Bold** – Pole
Italics – Fastest Lap

=== Teams' Championship ===
Pos	Team	No.	SUZ	OKA^{†}	FUJ	MOT	OKA		SUG	SUZ		Points
1	P.mu/cerumo・INGING	1	11	**1**	6	3	7	3	16	**3**	**3**	54
1	P.mu/cerumo・INGING	2	2	6	Ret	4	2	1	15	1	6	54
2	VANTELIN Team TOM'S	36	7	8	4	2	12	4	5	2	2	51
2	VANTELIN Team TOM'S	37	12	17	2	7	**19**	2	4	5	16	51
3	ITOCHU ENEX Team Impul	19	10	19	1	Ret	8	5	Ret	8	4	42
3	ITOCHU ENEX Team Impul	20	14	13	3	**1**	13	9	**1**	18	8	42
4	Docomo Team Dandelion Racing	40	9	4	13	Ret	4	**16**	3	4	Ret	36.5
4	Docomo Team Dandelion Racing	41	3	12	**Ret**	6	1	7	6	17	1	36.5
5	Nakajima Racing	64	Ret	7	DNS	10	6	12	2	10	10	15
5	Nakajima Racing	65	8	14	14	Ret	14	18	9	6	5	15
6	Team Mugen	16	**1**	5	Ret	8	10	6	14	19	Ret	14.5
7	Real Racing	10	5	2	8	12	5	11	11	11	12	14.5
7	Real Racing	11	Ret	3	11	14	16	8	13	16	Ret	14.5
8	Kondō Racing	3	6	9	5	5	9	10	8	12	15	12
8	Kondō Racing	4	15	11	Ret	13	15	15	10	13	13	12
9	Drago Corse	34	4	15	12	11	11	14	7	7	9	8
10	SUNOCO Team LeMans	7	Ret	16	7	Ret	3	Ret	12	15	14	6
10	SUNOCO Team LeMans	8	16	18	10	9	18	17	17	9	7	6
11	KCMG	18	13	10	9	15	17	13	Ret	14	11	0
Pos	Team	No.	SUZ	OKA^{†}	FUJ	MOT	OKA		SUG	SUZ		Points

Colour	Result
Gold	Winner
Silver	Second place
Bronze	Third place
Green	Points classification
Blue	Non-points classification
Blue	Non-classified finish (NC)
Purple	Retired, not classified (Ret)
Red	Did not qualify (DNQ)
Red	Did not pre-qualify (DNPQ)
Black	Disqualified (DSQ)
White	Did not start (DNS)
White	Withdrew (WD)
White	Race cancelled (C)
Blank	Did not practice (DNP)
Blank	Did not arrive (DNA)
Blank	Excluded (EX)

**Bold** – Pole
Italics – Fastest Lap

^{†} Half points were awarded at the first Okayama round as less than 75% of the scheduled distance was completed.
