= Drago Corse =

Japanese car racing team

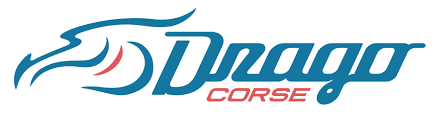
- Founded: 2014
- Team principal(s): Ryo Michigami
- Founder(s): Ryo Michigami
- Current series: F4 Japanese Championship
- Former series: Super Formula; Super GT; Japanese Formula 3 Championship; TCR Japan Touring Car Series

Drago LLC, also known as Drago Corse, is a Japanese racing team. The team was founded by long-time Honda driver and 2000 JGTC champion Ryo Michigami in 2014.

== History ==
Ryo Michigami, who had been active as a racer, founded Drago Corse as a racing kart team in 2014.

=== Super Formula ===
In 2014, the team participated in the final two races of the 2014 Super Formula season with Takuya Izawa as the driver, achieving a best finish of 14th. For 2015, the team raced with Takashi Kogure for two seasons, finishing 15th in 2015 and 13th in 2016. At the end of 2016, Drago Corse discontinued their operation in Super Formula and Super GT GT500 as founder Michigami focused to compete for the JAS Motorsport-run Honda team in the 2017 World Touring Car Championship.

In 2020, Drago Corse returned to the championship in partnership with ThreeBond. This marked the team's first appearance in the championship since 2016. Tatiana Calderón moved to the revived Drago Corse team from the FIA Formula 2 Championship, becoming the first female driver in the current Super Formula era. Koudai Tsukakoshi replaced Calderón for a couple of rounds when Calderón was unable to enter Japan during the pandemic border restrictions. In 2022, 2021 Super Formula Championship runner-up Nirei Fukuzumi moved to the team, replacing Calderón, who departed the series after making nine starts across two seasons.

For 2023, ThreeBond acquired the team's entry and rebranded as ThreeBond Racing. Drago Corse still runs the team as Michigami is still the team manager. Honda's junior programme boss Masakazu Abe serves as team director, while Koudai Tsukakoshi joined the squad in an advisory role. They signed Atsushi Miyake to replace KCMG-bound Nirei Fukuzumi.

=== Japanese Formula 3 ===
In 2017, Drago Corse teamed up with ThreeBond to race in Japanese Formula 3 Championship, and entered the under the name ThreeBond Racing with Drago Corse. The team competed until 2019 in the series. The team achieved good results with Alex Palou in their first season clinching third in the standings, Ukyo Sasahara clinched third as well in 2018. And for 2019, Hiroki Otsu returned to the series, alongside Ai Miura.

=== Super GT ===
Drago Corse entered Super GT in 2015 as the replacement for the Dome Racing Honda team. The team formed a partnership with Modulo, becoming Drago Modulo Honda Racing. Oliver Turvey and Takashi Kogure were the drivers announced for the 2015 season. For 2016, Kogure was replaced by Hideki Mutoh, and Tadasuke Makino would appear for the team whenever Turvey was not available. The team announced their withdrawal from the series on 8 November 2016, after just two seasons.

The team returned to Super GT in 2018, competing in the GT300 class with Ryo Michigami and Hiroki Otsu as drivers. Driving the Honda NSX GT3, the pair would finish 14th in 2018 and 17th in 2019, scoring a podium in each season. For 2020, Michigami was paired with Jake Parsons, a season where they finished 22nd in the standings. The 2021 campaign saw Shogo Mitsuyama partnered with Michigami as the team received new sponsorship from Yogibo, while Misato Haga was confirmed as the team principal; the season yielded five points and 23rd place in the standings.

For 2022, the team switched to the Nissan GT-R Nismo GT3 after Nissan-related vehicle customisation company Busou became their new title sponsor. Two-time GT500 and GT300 champion Masataka Yanagida and GT500 race winner Yuji Ide were named as the drivers, while Michigami stepped away from driving duties to become the new team director. On 1 August, Drago Corse and Busou terminated their partnership after the latter reportedly ran into financial difficulties, and the team did not return for the remainder of the season. The team did not return to the series in 2023.
