= JLOC =

Japanese organization specializing the usage of Lamborghini cars

(Japan) Team JLOC
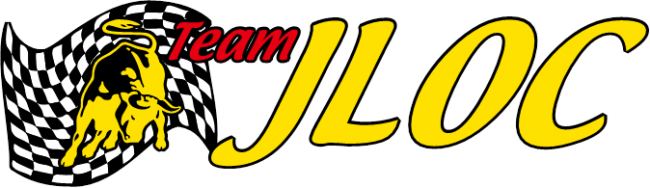
- Founded: 1994
- Base: Ichinomiya, Aichi Prefecture
- Team principal(s): Isao Noritake
- Current series: Super GT
- Former series: Asian Le Mans Series
- Current drivers: Car #87: (Japan) Yuya Motojima; (Japan) Kosuke Matsuura; Car #88: (Japan) Takashi Kogure; (Italy) Daniil Kvyat (Note: Kvyat is a Russian driver competing under the Italian flag, as Russian national emblems were banned by the FIA following the 2022 Russian invasion of Ukraine.)
- Noted drivers: (Japan) Takao Wada (Japan) Satoshi Ikezawa (Japan) Hisashi Wada (Japan) Naohiro Furuya (Italy) Marco Apicella (Japan) Koji Yamanishi (Japan) Yasutaka Hinoi (Japan) Atsushi Yogo (Japan) Hiroyuki Iiri (Japan) Yuhi Sekiguchi (Japan) Manabu Orido (Japan) Takayuki Aoki (Japan) Kazuki Hiramine (Italy) Marco Mapelli (Macau) André Couto (Japan) Kiyoto Fujinami
- Teams' Championships: Asian Le Mans Series: 1 (2009); Super GT: 1 (2024)
- Drivers' Championships: Asian Le Mans Series: 2009: Atsushi Yogo, Hiroyuki Iiri; Super GT: 2024: Takashi Kogure, Yuya Motojima
- Website: www.jloc-net.com www.team-jloc.com

The Japan Lamborghini Owners' Club (JLOC) is an organization of Lamborghini car owners in Japan, whose members would later form Team JLOC, currently competing in the GT300 class of Super GT, in 1994.

Team JLOC first entered Super GT in 1994 and has been active in the series ever since, initially fielding cars in the GT500 class before switching to GT300 in 2006 due to the uncompetitiveness of its cars against factory-backed entries in GT500. The team is the reigning champions in the GT300 class with drivers Takashi Kogure and Yuya Motojima. Cars run by Team JLOC had also previously competed in the 24 Hours of Le Mans and the Asian Le Mans Series.

== History ==
JLOC was first founded in 1980 by a group of the Lamborghini Miura owners due to difficulties with getting spare parts and maintenance of their cars. The original JLOC operated in the Kansai region and was dissolved a few years later, but it was reformed in 1987 following Lamborghini's request. Isao Noritake, who had already become a member of the original JLOC, was elected as the chairman of the group upon its reformation. Seventeen members became part of the organization when JLOC held their first meeting in Sanza Villa, Lake Hamana in 1988 and by 2000, more than 100 members had joined the organization. The first meeting in 1988 served as the inspiration for Team JLOC's usage of #88 as their primary number in racing competition.

=== JGTC / Super GT ===
In the early 1990s, JLOC member Teruaki Terai wanted to take part in motorsport despite lacking a race car or a sponsor. In 1993, Terai managed to acquire a fire-damaged Lamborghini Countach 25th Anniversary that he planned to convert into a race car for the recently established All Japan Grand Touring Car Championship. Terai and Masahiko Mearashi, a former car magazine editor and a JLOC member, planned to reinforce the burnt chassis with a mono-plastic body with plans to enter the 1994 JGTC season, but by the spring of 1994 the project was still unfinished.

JLOC, competing under the KEN WOLF with Terai Engineering name in 1994, was initially unable to enter the season opening race at Fuji Speedway but they were requested to enter the race by the organizers after they heard the news of JLOC’s planned participation. Circuit no Ōkami’s mangaka Satoshi Ikezawa was invited by Mearashi to negotiate a deal with exotic car dealership Art Sports to supply a road-going Countach for JLOC. Due to the limited amount of time, the Countach was kept mostly stock but it received modifications to its bodywork, suspension, and engine. Noritake, who had flown to Italy to inform Lamborghini about the project, became Team JLOC’s team manager. F3000 driver Takao Wada and Ikezawa were signed to be their drivers, while the team also secured sponsorship from Rain-X. The car was mostly unsuccessful, having only finished two of the five races it competed in but it managed to score points with an eight place finish in the second round at Sendai.

For 1995, JLOC requested Lamborghini to develop a Diablo homologation special for JGTC competition. Three Diablo Jota’s were developed, two for competition purposes and one for road homologation; all three models still exist in Japan. The Diablo Jota would compete in all but one round of the 1995 season, scoring no championship points and a best finish of 13th at Sendai and Fuji respectively. Wada and Ikezawa were retained as the team’s drivers, although Ikezawa was replaced by Tatsuhiko Kanoumi for the final round at Mine. Tragedy struck the team that year, however, as Terai died from cancer in August. JLOC continued to campaign the Diablo Jota’s for the 1996 season, once again scoring no championship points at the end of the season.

In between the 1996 and 1997 seasons, Lamborghini contracted Signes Advanced Technologies (SAT) to develop the Lamborghini Diablo GT-1 Stradale, a racing version of the Diablo that was planned to be raced in the GT1 class at Le Mans. Financial difficulties would force the company to not go further with the project, but two cars had been built before the project was closed. One of the models, the racing version of the Diablo GT-1 Stradale, was bought by JLOC for the 1997 JGTC season. Hisashi Wada was also signed by the team to replace Ikezawa.

JLOC raced the Diablo GT-1 for the next four seasons. JLOC scored two points finishes with the Diablo GT-1 in 1998, but they failed to score a championship point in the 1997, 1999, and 2000 seasons. The 2000 version of JLOC’s Diablo GT-1 famously became the first Lamborghini car to be featured in Gran Turismo due to a licensing quirk. Sony Computer Entertainment, who at that time did not have the official Lamborghini licensing, paid JLOC to license their Diablo GT-1 for Gran Turismo 3: A-Spec. The licensing controversy meant that the JLOC Diablo only appeared in the NTSC-J version of Gran Turismo 3: A-Spec at Lamborghini’s request and only made its return in Gran Turismo 5, a year after Lamborghini’s introduction as a fully licensed manufacturer in 2009’s Gran Turismo for the PlayStation Portable.

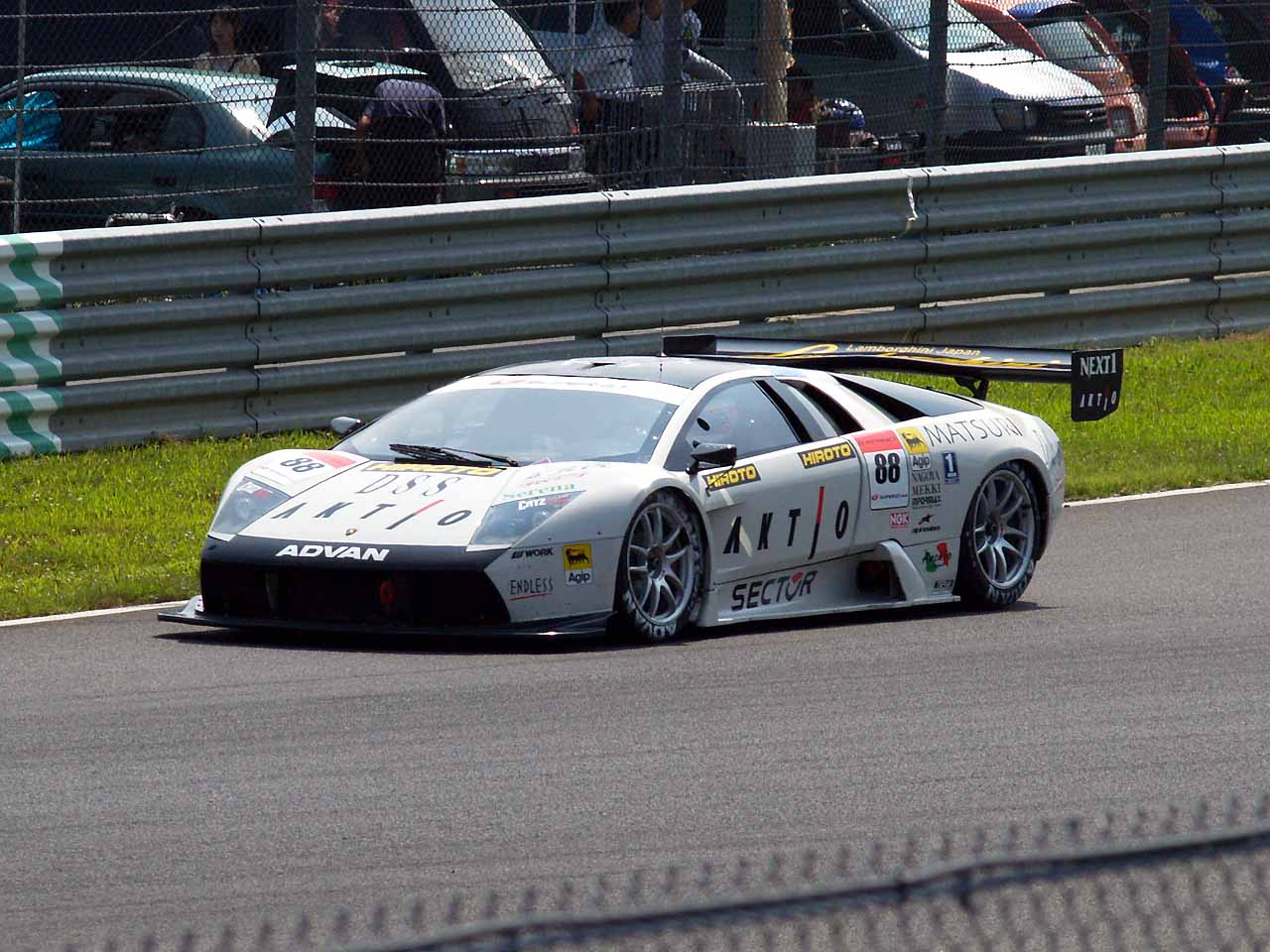
JLOC's Lamborghini Murciélago RG-1 at Suzuka in 2005, the team's final year of competition in GT500.

JLOC redeveloped the Diablo GT-1 into the Diablo JGT-1 for the 2001 season, which featured a reworked chassis and suspension along with other parts specially built for JGTC. The Diablo JGT-1 was raced for three seasons but despite this, the car continued to score little success as it struggled to compete with the factory-backed entries in GT500. JLOC then switched to a brand new Lamborghini Murciélago R-GT for the 2004 season, labeled as the RG-1 by the team, but a lack of spare parts forced the team to race the Diablo JGT-1 for the fourth round at Tokachi. JLOC continued to be uncompetitive with the Murciélago R-GT in GT500 and when JGTC was rebranded into Super GT in the 2005 season, JLOC began to compete in the GT300 class after they homologated the R-GT for GT300 regulations.

JLOC made the full switch to GT300 class in the 2006 season and expanded to a two-car team with the addition of the #87 Murciélago RG-1, driven by Koji Yamanishi and Hisashi Wada. The team scored immediate success as the team’s #88 Murciélago RG-1, driven by long-time JLOC driver Marco Apicella and new signing Yasutaka Hinoi, won the season opening race at Suzuka to give Murciélago its first win in international competition. The #88 team would also score one pole position at Sportsland Sugo and finished 11th in the GT300 standings that year while the #87 team would finish 19th, having scored 3 points finishes and one fastest lap in Suzuka.

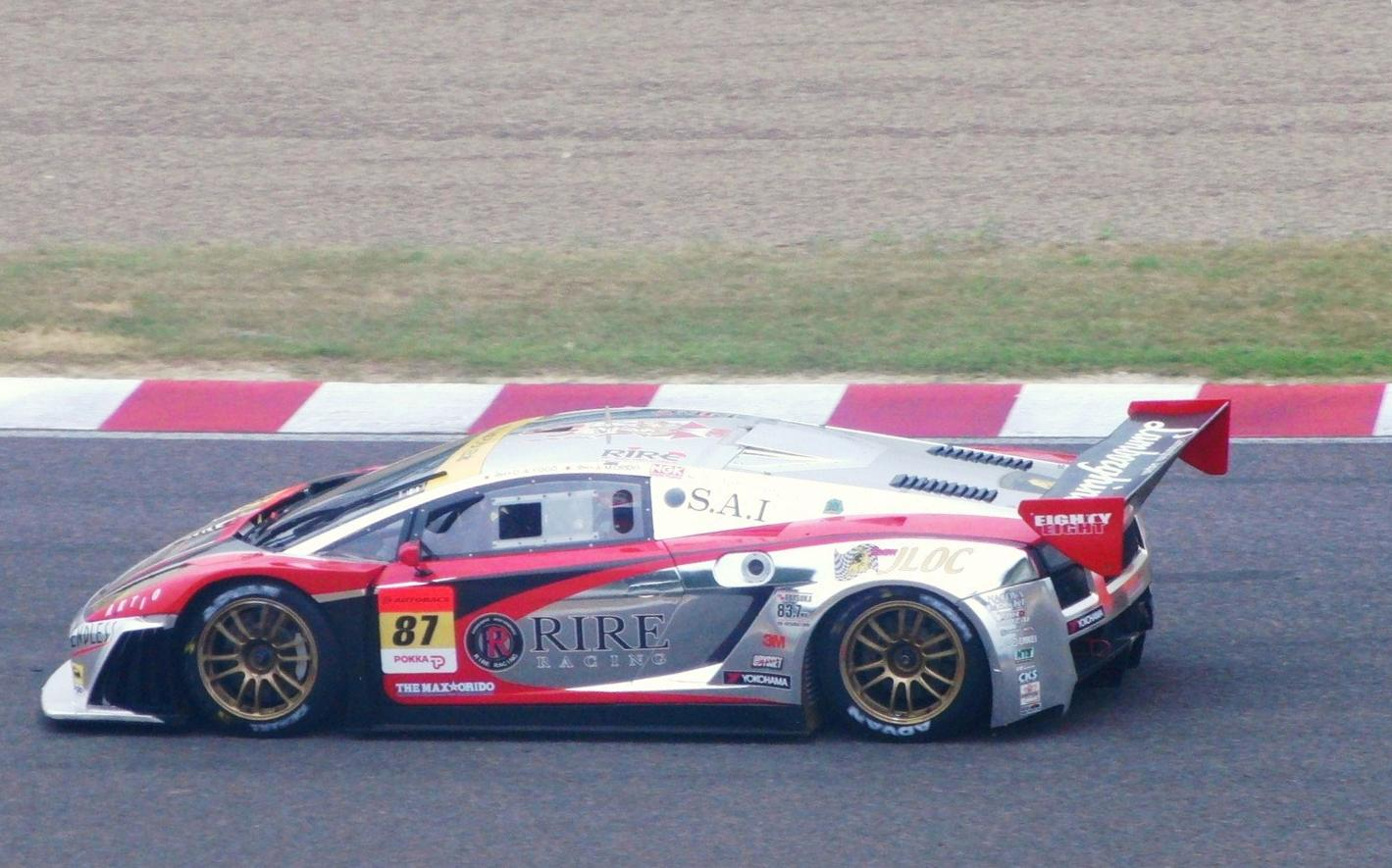
The Lamborghini Gallardo RG-3 (pictured in 2011) was developed to replace the aging Murciélago RG-1.

JLOC expanded further into a four-car team in 2007, entering two self-developed Lamborghini Gallardo RG-3s alongside the two Murciélago RG-1 entries. The team downscaled into a three-car team in the following season as the team phased out one of the Murciélago entries before the Murciélago RG-1 was placed into retirement at the end of the 2009 season. The team competed with three Gallardo RG-3s for the 2010 season and scored their best championship finish at the time with Yamanishi and future series champion Yuhi Sekiguchi in the #86 team, who finished 9th in the GT300 standings after scoring one podium, one pole position and five points finishes.

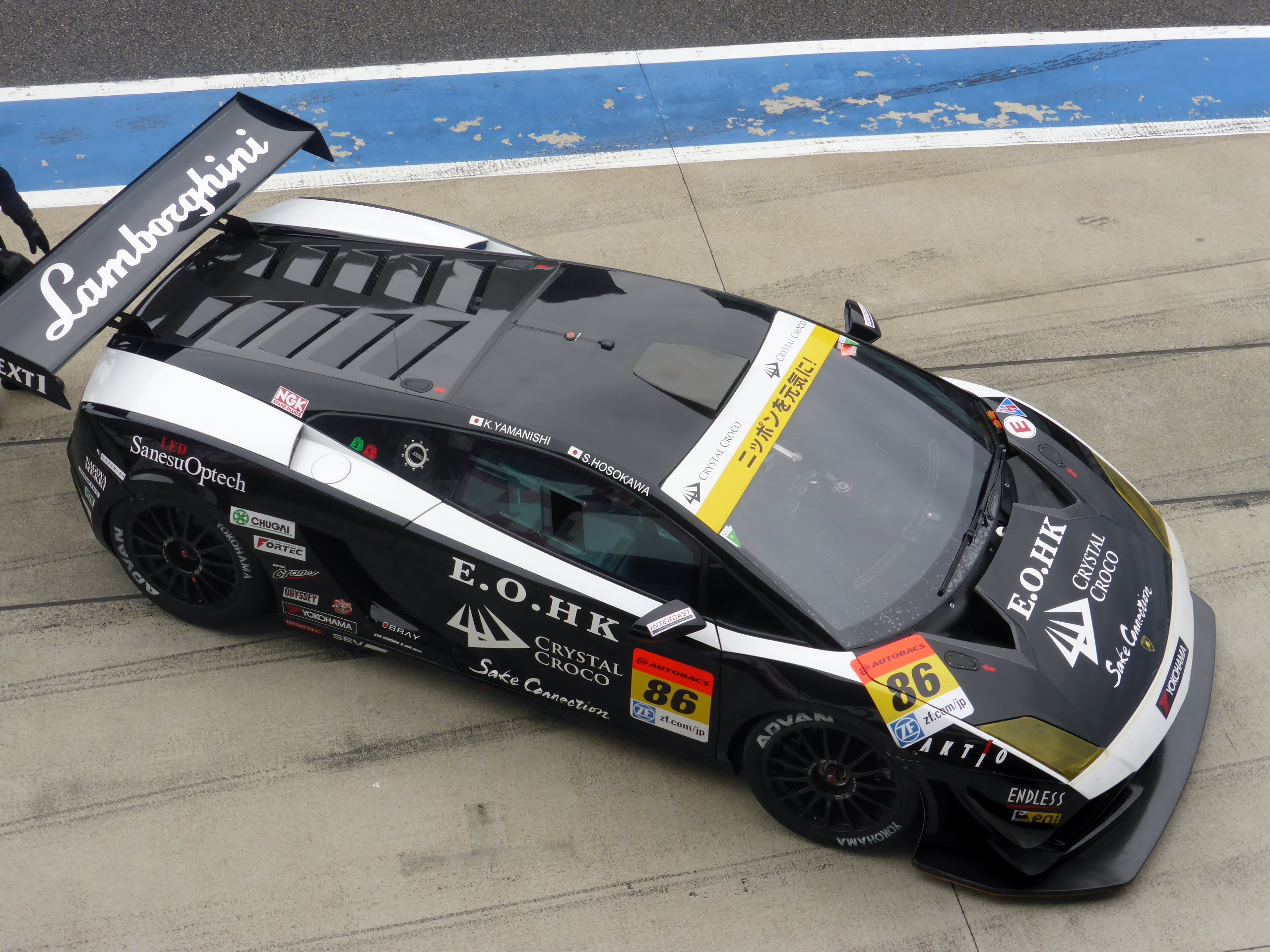
JLOC's #86 Lamborghini Gallardo GT3 in 2014.

JLOC continued to enter three RG-3s in 2011 before expanding to a four-car team once more in 2012 after the team acquired two FIA-GT3 specification Gallardos. Manabu Orido and Atsushi Yogo, racing the GT3-specification Gallardo, recorded the team’s new best place finish in the standings as the duo finished 8th as the highest finishing team to not score a race win that year. By 2013, the team had fully phased out the RG-3s and returned into a three-car team, all of them fielding GT3-specification Lamborghini Gallardos. JLOC downscaled further into a two-car team in 2014 and scored one win at Sugo, courtesy of Orido and Takayuki Aoki in the #88 Gallardo GT3. JLOC continued to field the Gallardo GT3’s for another season before they switched to the Lamborghini Huracán GT3 in the 2016 season.

The flagship number 88 JLOC car was a consistent points scorer on the team’s first season with the Huracán GT3, finishing 11th in the championship with the driver pairing of Orido and Kazuki Hiramine after scoring 6 top-10 finishes. JLOC’s performance was inconsistent in the following year, but Orido and Hiramine finished 10th in the standings and both JLOC cars finished on the podium at the Suzuka 1000km race. Orido left the team at the end of the 2017 season and was replaced by Lamborghini factory driver Marco Mapelli in the 2018 season. JLOC scored two pole positions that year with the #88 Huracán GT3, but was unable to score a victory as the Team JLOC cars finished 10th and 11th at the end of the season.

Mapelli returned to Europe in the following year and was replaced by Takashi Kogure, who had been released from his Honda GT500 factory seat. Since Hiramine was signed by Kondo Racing in the off-season, Yuya Motojima was transferred from the #87 team to join Kogure in the #88 car. Kogure and Motojima would bring JLOC their best-ever championship finish to date as they finished the year in 7th with 36.5 points and 2 podium finishes. The #87 car, primarily driven by Tsubasa Takahashi and former GT300 champion André Couto with Kiyoto Fujinami entered on the endurance races, finished 8th after winning the Fuji GT 500 Mile Race.

Couto and Lamborghini factory driver Dennis Lind were due to compete with the team in 2020, but the advent of the COVID-19 pandemic meant that they were unable to foresee their deal with JLOC that year. JLOC would eventually retain Kogure, Motojima and Takahashi for 2020 as Shinnosuke Yamada, who raced with Team UpGarage as their endurance race driver last year, was signed by JLOC to partner Takahashi in the #87 car for the full season. The team struggled in 2020 as they only scored a total of three points finishes with Kogure and Motojima ending up as the best finishing JLOC car in 13th place on the standings.

Kogure and Motojima continued to race the #88 JLOC car in 2021 as former IndyCar driver Kosuke Matsuura and Natsu Sakaguchi was signed to create an all-new driver line-up in the #87 car. Kogure and Motojima enjoyed a better season that year as they were consistently finishing in the points, eventually finishing that year in 8th place with 1 podium finish and five points finishes. Matsuura and Sakaguchi, on the other hand, continued to struggled as they only recorded one points finish at Sugo, eventually finishing 20th in the driver standings. Despite this, all four drivers would be retained by the team for the 2022 season. The pairing of Kogure and Motojima went on to finish 13th in the drivers standings, having finished in the top-10 positions five times. Matsuura and Sakaguchi enjoyed a better season as they scored JLOC's lone podium finish of the year in the final round at Motegi and finished 15th in the driver standings. The team also played a crucial role in the championship as two late overtakes from both JLOC cars at Motegi, including a last-lap overtake on GAINER's Ryuichiro Tomita by Kogure, allowed Kondo Racing to clinch the GT300 title after the right front wheel of Kondo's Nissan GT-R GT3 came off the car midway through the race.

JLOC retained all four drivers for 2023 and initially started the year with a pair of Huracán GT3 Evo's. Before Round 4 at Fuji, the #88 car of Kogure and Motojima was upgraded into the Evo 2 spec while their old car was handed over to the #87 team after their initial car was written off after a heavy crash with Nismo's Tsugio Matsuda at Suzuka. JLOC planned to also introduce a second Huracán GT3 Evo 2 for the #87 team later in the season, but it was scrapped due to Balance of Performance concerns. The upgraded machinery allowed Kogure and Motojima to tie JLOC's best championship finish of seventh, having scored victory in the last round at Motegi. Matsuura and Sakaguchi in the older specification Huracán GT3 Evo finished 15th, finishing on the podium in the second visit to Suzuka. They were due to receive their Huracán GT3 Evo 2 in time for the start of the 2024 season, however delays from the Lamborghini side meant that the #87 team only received theirs starting from Round 4 at Fuji. The team enjoyed their best season to date as Kogure and Motojima claimed JLOC's first GT300 championship title with four race wins, the most for a GT300 team since Team Taisan Jr. and its driver pairing of Shingo Tachi and Keiichi Suzuki secured five wins in the 1998 season.

=== 24 Hours of Le Mans ===
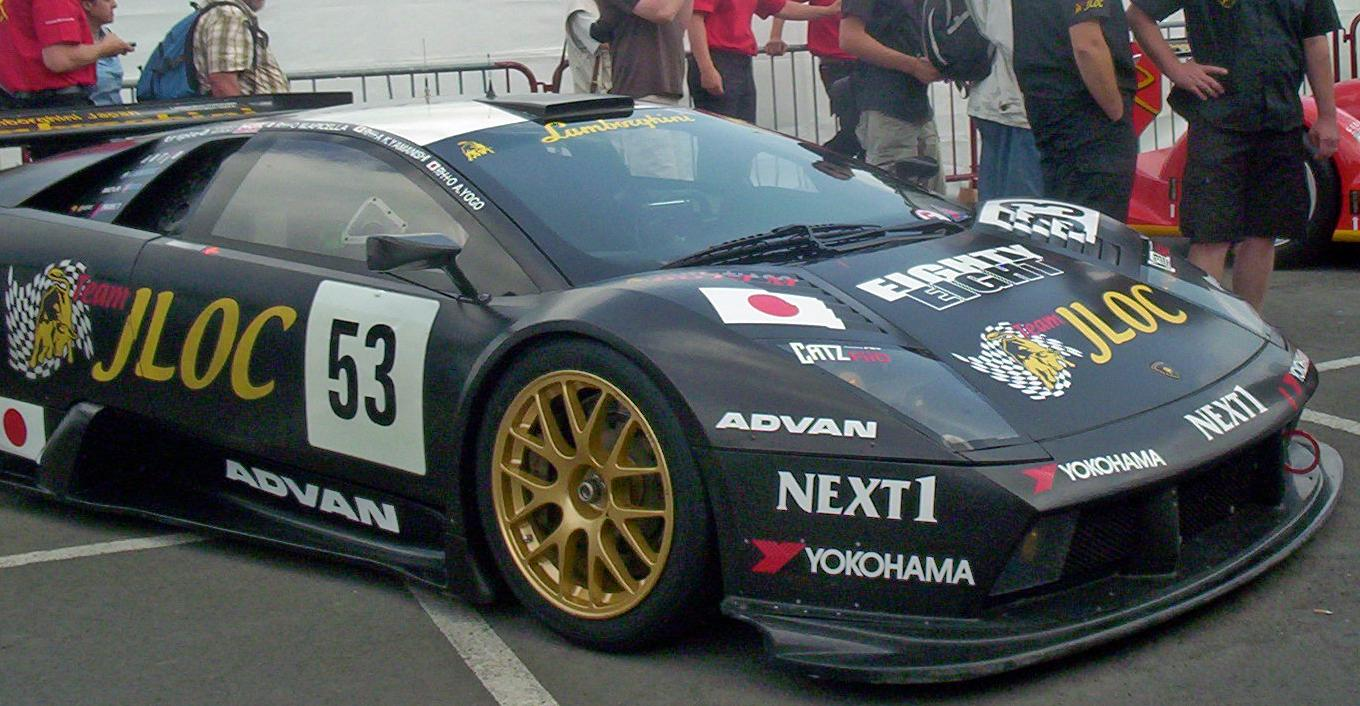
JLOC's Lamborghini Murciélago RG-1LM in 2007.

JLOC first attempted to enter the 24 Hours of Le Mans in 2005, but they failed to secure an entry. They entered the 24 Hours of Le Mans for the first time in 2006 with a Lamborghini Murciélago RG-1LM, a Murciélago R-GT that was modified by JLOC for endurance racing. JLOC’s Super GT drivers Marco Apicella, Yasutaka Hinoi, and Koji Yamanishi would share the driving duties for the team’s debut at Le Mans. The team completed 283 laps but stopped with three hours left in the race and did not complete the final lap, leaving them non-classified in the final results.

The team returned to Le Mans the next year with a driver line-up of Apicella, Yamanishi and Atsushi Yogo. JLOC received logistical support from DAMS for their participation in the 2007 race. Apicella suffered a major crash at the first Mulsanne chicane in the Wednesday first qualifying session, which damaged the RG-1LM beyond repair. JLOC successfully earned a dispensation by the ACO to replace their damaged RG-1LM with a standard R-GT for the race itself. In addition, Apicella was declared unfit after the crash, leaving Yamanishi and Yogo to compete as a duo. The team only completed one lap before it was forced to retire due to a broken driveshaft.

JLOC didn’t enter the 2008 edition of the 24 Hours of Le Mans and only returned for the 2009 edition with Apicella, Yogo, and Yutaka Yamagishi as the team’s drivers. JLOC suffered numerous mechanical issues throughout practice and qualifying that left them unable to qualify for the race. ACO, however, allowed the team to start the race. As Apicella and a number of mechanics had flown back home after the team’s initial failure to qualify, JLOC elected to start and park the car after completing just one lap.

For the 2010 race, JLOC was given an entry after the team won the Okayama 1000km race of 2009 that made up the sole Asian Le Mans Series round of that year. Yogo, Yamanishi, and Hiroyuki Iiri are elected to drive JLOC’s newly-prepared Murciélago LP670 R-SV for the race. The team retired at the 18th hour mark after only completing 138 laps due to suffering from numerous puncture and transmission problems.

JLOC never received manufacturer support and struggled to be competitive during their four Le Mans attempts. In an interview with Motorsport.com in 2022, JLOC’s team principal Isao Noritake believes that the project struggled to be competitive because Audi lost interest in the Murciélago R-GT project, forcing JLOC to compete independently despite being the sole representative for Lamborghini at Le Mans.

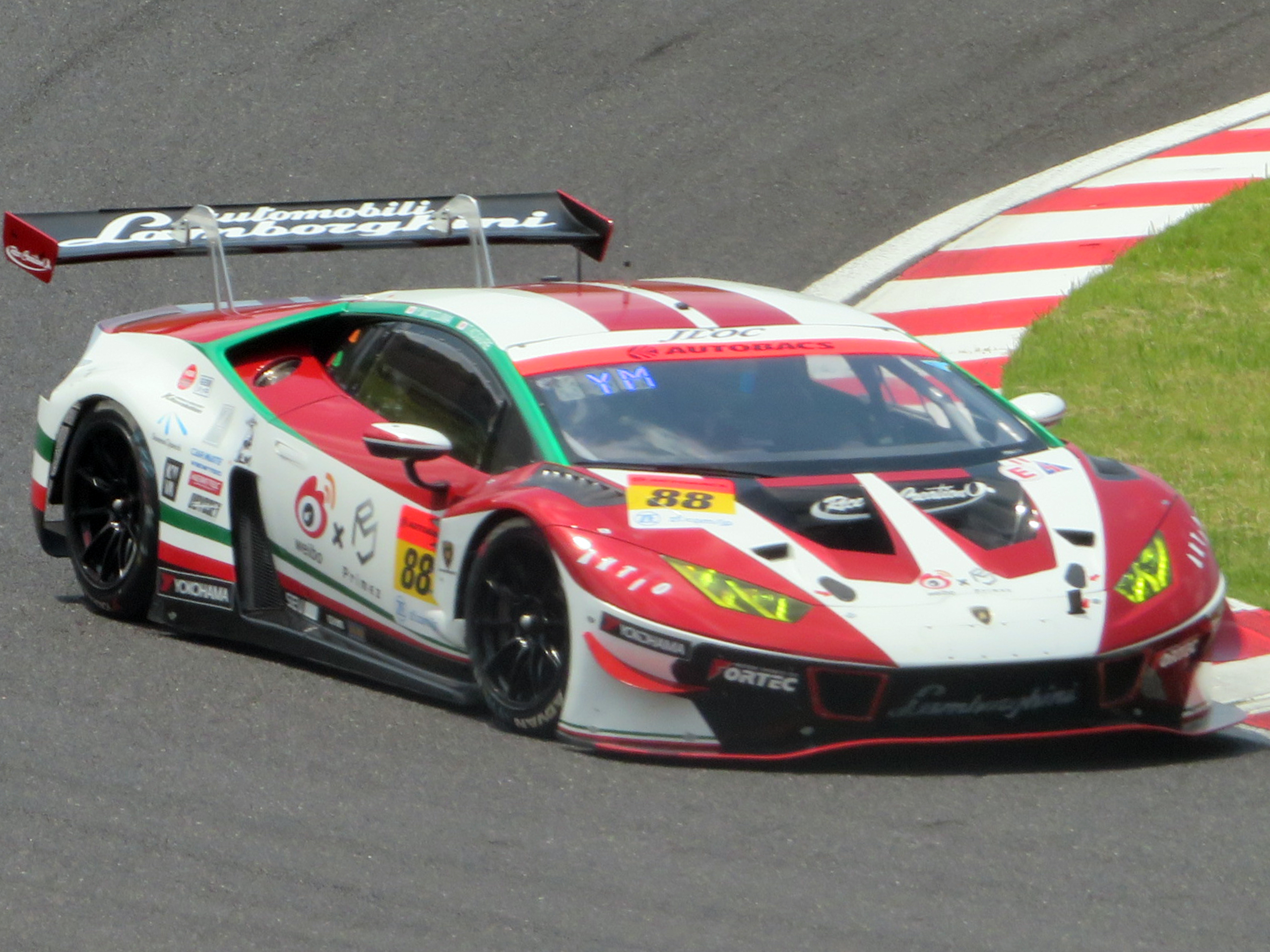
No.88 Weibo Primez Lamborghini GT3 at 2022 Takanoko no Hotel Suzuka GT 300km

== Racing record ==
=== Complete JGTC results ===
(key) (Races in bold indicate pole position) (Races in italics indicate fastest lap)

Year	Car	Tyres	Class	No.	Drivers	1	2	3	4	5	6	7	8	Pos	Pts
1994	Lamborghini Countach	Y	GT1	88	(Japan) Takao Wada (Japan) Satoshi Ikezawa	FUJ; NC	SEN; 8	FUJ; Ret	SUG; 11	MIN; Ret				12th	3
1995	Lamborghini Diablo Jota	Y	GT1	88	(Japan) Takao Wada (Japan) Satoshi Ikezawa (Japan) Tatsuhiko Kaneumi	SUZ; 15	FUJ	SEN; 13	FUJ; 13	SUG; Ret	MIN; Ret			NC	0
1996	Lamborghini Diablo Jota	Y	GT500	88	(Japan) Takao Wada (Japan) Satoshi Ikezawa (Japan) Tatsuhiko Kaneumi	SUZ; Ret	FUJ; Ret	SEN	FUJ; 11	SUG; Ret	MIN; 13			NC	0
1997	Lamborghini Diablo GTR	Y	GT500	88	(Japan) Takao Wada (Japan) Hisashi Wada	SUZ	FUJ; Ret	SEN; Ret	FUJ; 14	MIN; Ret	SUG; 13			NC	0
1998	Lamborghini Diablo GT-1	D	GT500	88	(Japan) Hisashi Wada (Japan) Naohiro Furuya	SUZ; Ret	FUJ; C	SEN; 9	FUJ; 18	MOT; 10	MIN; 13	SUG; 11		16th	3
1998	Lamborghini Diablo Jota	D	GT500	777	(Japan) Takao Wada (Japan) Masami Sugiyama	SUZ; 15	FUJ; C	SEN	FUJ; 17	MOT; Ret	MIN; DNA	SUG; Ret		16th	3
1999	Lamborghini Diablo GT-1	T	GT500	88	(Japan) Hisashi Wada (Japan) Naohiro Furuya	SUZ; 15	FUJ; Ret	SUG; 14	MIN; Ret	FUJ; 17	OKA; Ret	MOT; 14		NC	0
2000	Lamborghini Diablo GT-1	D	GT500	88	(Japan) Naohiro Furuya (Japan) Tsuyoshi Takahashi	MOT; 15	FUJ; 13	SUG; 17	FUJ; 16	OKA; 18	MIN; 12	SUZ; 14		NC	0
2001	Lamborghini Diablo JGT-1	D	GT500	88	(Japan) Naohiro Furuya (Italy) Marco Apicella	OKA; DNS	FUJ; Ret	SUG; DNS	FUJ; Ret	MOT; 15	SUZ; 14	MIN; 15		NC	0
2002	Lamborghini Diablo JGT-1	D	GT500	88	(Japan) Hisashi Wada (Italy) Marco Apicella	OKA; DNQ	FUJ; Ret	SUG; 15	SEP; Ret	FUJ; Ret	MOT; 18	MIN; Ret	SUZ; Ret	NC	0
2003	Lamborghini Diablo JGT-1	D	GT500	88	(Japan) Hisashi Wada (Japan) Naohiro Furuya (Japan) Koji Yamanishi	OKA; 15	FUJ; Ret	SUG; Ret	FUJ; 16	FUJ; 15	MOT; 15	AUT; Ret	SUZ; Ret	NC	0
2004	Lamborghini Murcielago R-GT	D	GT500	88	(Japan) Hisashi Wada (Japan) Koji Yamanishi	OKA	SUG; DNQ	SEP; Ret		MOT; Ret	AUT; Ret	SUZ; 18		NC	0
2004	Lamborghini Diablo JGT-1	D	GT500	88	(Japan) Hisashi Wada (Japan) Koji Yamanishi				TOK; DNQ					NC	0

=== Complete Super GT results ===
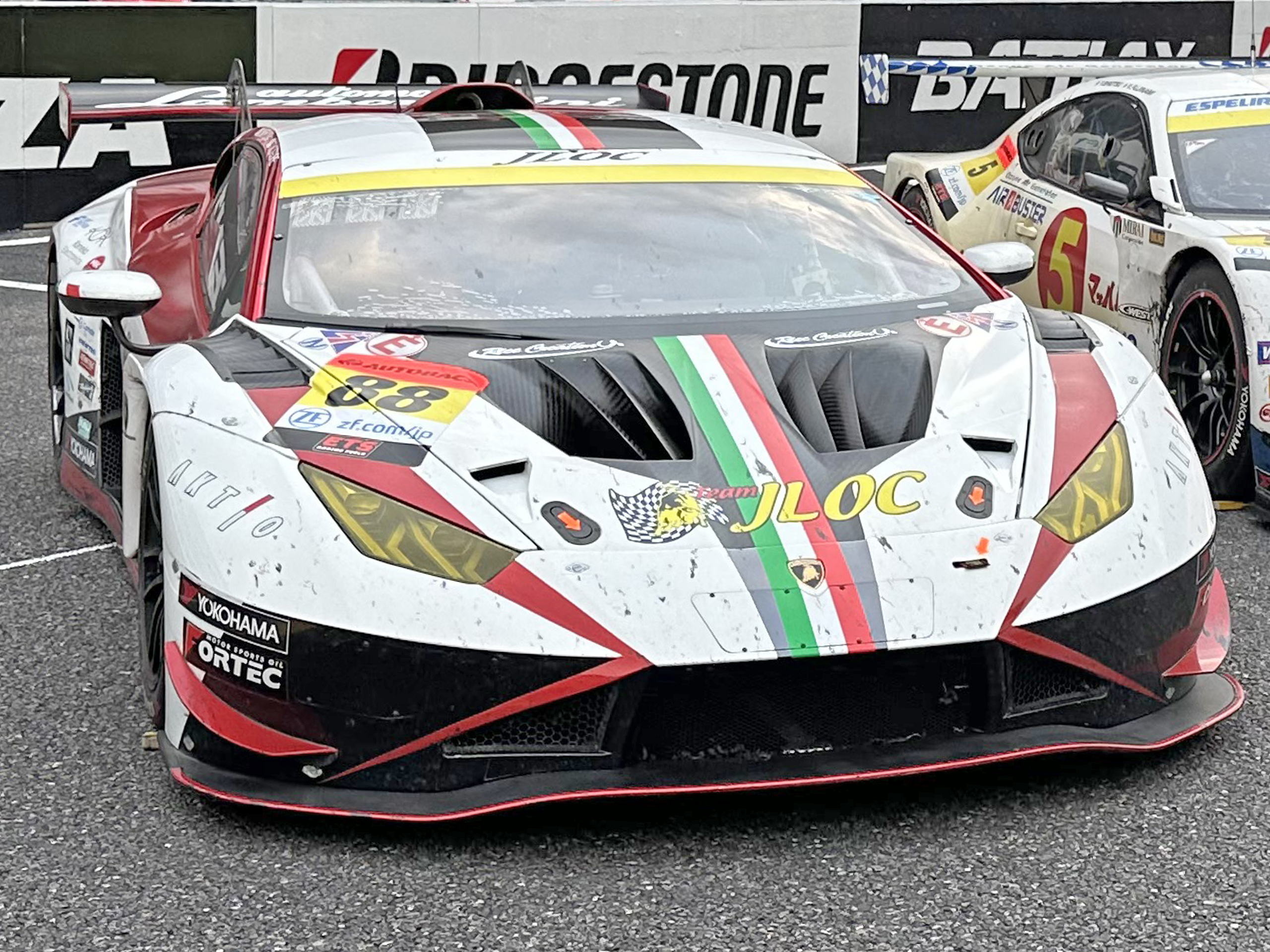
The #88 Lamborghini Huracán GT3 Evo 2 that brought JLOC to its first championship title in 2024.

(key) (Races in bold indicate pole position) (Races in italics indicate fastest lap)

Year	Car	Tyres	Class	No.	Drivers	1	2	3	4	5	6	7	8	9	Pos	Points
2005	Lamborghini Murciélago RG-1	Y	GT300	86	(Japan) Koji Yamanishi (Japan) Naohiro Furuya	OKA	FUJ	SEP	SUG	MOT	FUJ	AUT	SUZ; 11		NC	0
2005	Lamborghini Murciélago RG-1	Y	GT300	87	(Japan) Hisashi Wada (Japan) Naohiro Furuya (Italy) Marco Apicella	OKA	FUJ	SEP	SUG; Ret	MOT; 11	FUJ; 8	AUT	SUZ; Ret		14th	3
2005	Lamborghini Murciélago R-GT	Y	GT500	88	(Japan) Koji Yamanishi (Japan) Hisashi Wada (Italy) Marco Apicella (Japan) Naohiro Furuya	OKA; 13	FUJ; DNS	SEP	SUG; Ret	MOT; 17	FUJ; Ret	AUT	SUZ		NC	0
2006	Lamborghini Murciélago RG-1	Y	GT300	87	(Japan) Koji Yamanishi (Japan) Hisashi Wada (Japan) Atsushi Yogo	SUZ; 5	OKA; Ret	FUJ; 5	SEP	SUG; 12	SUZ; 17	MOT; 13	AUT; 18	FUJ; 9	17th	14
2006	Lamborghini Murciélago RG-1	Y	GT300	88	(Italy) Marco Apicella (Japan) Yasutaka Hinoi (Japan) Naohiro Furuya	SUZ; 1	OKA; 6	FUJ; Ret	SEP	SUG; 15	SUZ; Ret	MOT; Ret	AUT; 8	FUJ; 5	11th	34
2007	Lamborghini Gallardo RG-3	Y	GT300	66	(Japan) Naohiro Furuya (Japan) Muneyuki Kurihara (Japan) Atsushi Yogo	SUZ; DNP	OKA; 21	FUJ; Ret	SEP; DNQ	SUG; DNP	SUZ; DNP	MOT; 22	AUT; Ret	FUJ; Ret	29th	2
2007	Lamborghini Gallardo RG-3	Y	GT300	67	(Japan) Tsubasa Kurosawa (Japan) Hisashi Wada (Japan) Yasutaka Hinoi	SUZ; DNP	OKA; DNQ	FUJ; DNQ	SEP; DNS	SUG; DNQ	SUZ; 17	MOT; 19	AUT; Ret	FUJ; 25	26th	3
2007	Lamborghini Murciélago RG-1	Y	GT300	87	(Japan) Yasutaka Hinoi (Japan) Atsushi Yogo (Japan) Yoshihisa Namekata	SUZ; 12	OKA; 4	FUJ; 9	SEP; 7	SUG; DNS	SUZ	MOT	AUT	FUJ; 15	17th	25
2007	Lamborghini Murciélago RG-1	Y	GT300	88	(Japan) Koji Yamanishi (Italy) Marco Apicella (Japan) Hideshi Matsuda	SUZ; 4	OKA; Ret	**FUJ**; 2	SEP; 12	SUG; 9	SUZ	MOT	AUT	FUJ; Ret	12th	36
2008	Lamborghini Murciélago RG-1	Y	GT300	66	(Japan) Koji Yamanishi (Japan) Atsushi Yogo	SUZ; Ret	OKA; 8	FUJ; Ret	SEP; 7	SUG; 13	SUZ; 15	MOT; 3	AUT; Ret	FUJ; 19	14th	28
2008	Lamborghini Gallardo RG-3	Y	GT300	87	(Japan) Hisashi Wada (Japan) Muneyuki Kurihara (Japan) Yoshihisa Namekata	SUZ; DNQ	OKA; 19	FUJ; Ret	SEP; 20	SUG; 18	SUZ; 14	MOT; 23	AUT; 21	FUJ; Ret	22nd	6
2008	Lamborghini Gallardo RG-3	Y	GT300	88	(Japan) Hideshi Matsuda (Japan) Naohiro Furuya (Japan) Yuya Sakamoto	SUZ; DNQ	OKA; 16	FUJ; 16	SEP; 16	SUG; 19	SUZ; 12	MOT; Ret	AUT; 19	FUJ; 14	21st	7
2009	Lamborghini Murciélago RG-1	Y	GT300	66	(Japan) Koji Yamanishi (Japan) Atsushi Yogo (Italy) Marco Apicella	OKA; 18	SUZ; Ret	FUJ; 18	SEP; 5	SUG; 13	SUZ; 17	FUJ; 3	AUT; 11	MOT; 8	12th	36
2009	Lamborghini Gallardo RG-3	Y	GT300	87	(Japan) Hiroyuki Iiri (Japan) Hisashi Wada	OKA; 11	SUZ; Ret	FUJ; Ret	SEP; 15	SUG; Ret	SUZ; 12	FUJ; 11	AUT; 17	MOT; Ret	17th	8
2009	Lamborghini Gallardo RG-3	Y	GT300	88	(Japan) Hideshi Matsuda (Japan) Yuya Sakamoto	OKA; Ret	SUZ; 13	FUJ; 19	SEP; Ret	SUG; 12	SUZ; 10	**FUJ**; 10	AUT; 12	MOT; 11	15th	19
2010	Lamborghini Gallardo RG-3	Y	GT300	86	(Japan) Yuhi Sekiguchi (Japan) Koji Yamanishi	SUZ; 7	**OKA**; 4	FUJ; 16	SEP; 15	SUG; 10	SUZ; 5	FUJ; C	MOT; 3		9th	47
2010	Lamborghini Gallardo RG-3	Y	GT300	87	(Japan) Hiroyuki Iiri (Japan) Yuya Sakamoto (Japan) Naohiro Furuya	SUZ; 10	OKA; 17	FUJ; 15	SEP; 11	SUG; 17	SUZ; 12	FUJ; C	MOT; 20		18th	14
2010	Lamborghini Gallardo RG-3	Y	GT300	88	(Japan) Shinya Hosokawa (Japan) Atsushi Yogo (Japan) Tsubasa Kurosawa	SUZ; DNP	OKA; 16	FUJ; 17	SEP; 7	SUG; 14	SUZ; 15	FUJ; C	MOT; Ret		19th	13
2011	Lamborghini Gallardo RG-3	Y	GT300	86	(Japan) Takayuki Aoki (Japan) Yuya Sakamoto	OKA; Ret	FUJ; 10	SEP; 14	SUG; 15	SUZ; 10	FUJ; 8	AUT; 6	MOT; 12		15th	27
2011	Lamborghini Gallardo RG-3	Y	GT300	87	(Japan) Manabu Orido (Japan) Atsushi Yogo	OKA; 14	FUJ; 3	SEP; 7	SUG; 16	SUZ; 3	FUJ; 19	AUT; 16	MOT; 16		12th	42
2011	Lamborghini Gallardo RG-3	Y	GT300	88	(Japan) Hiroyuki Iiri (Japan) Yuhi Sekiguchi	OKA; 8	FUJ; Ret	SEP; 4	SUG; 10	SUZ; 15	FUJ; 4	AUT; 12	MOT; 5		11th	45
2012	Lamborghini Gallardo RG-3	Y	GT300	85	(Japan) Yuya Sakamoto (Japan) Masaki Kano (Japan) Ryohei Sakaguchi (Japan) Hideshi Matsuda	OKA; 14	FUJ; Ret	SEP	SUG	SUZ; 10	FUJ; 18	AUT; 15	MOT		21st	6
2012	Lamborghini Gallardo RG-3	Y	GT300	86	(Japan) Hideshi Matsuda (Japan) Junichiro Yamashita	OKA; Ret	FUJ; 14	SEP; DNS	SUG; 15	SUZ; Ret	FUJ; Ret	AUT	MOT		27th	2
2012	Lamborghini Gallardo GT3	Y	GT300	87	(Japan) Koji Yamanishi (Japan) Hideki Yamauchi	OKA; 21	FUJ; 7	SEP; 16	SUG; 19	SUZ; Ret	FUJ; Ret	AUT; Ret	MOT; 2		13th	28
2012	Lamborghini Gallardo GT3	Y	GT300	88	(Japan) Manabu Orido (Japan) Takayuki Aoki (Japan) Keita Sawa	OKA; 17	FUJ; Ret	SEP; Ret	SUG; 3	SUZ; 3	FUJ; Ret	AUT; 7	MOT; 3		7th	52
2013	Lamborghini Gallardo GT3	Y	GT300	86	(Japan) Koji Yamanishi (Japan) Shinya Hosokawa (Japan) Yuya Sakamoto	OKA; 11	FUJ; 3	SEP; 9	SUG; 12	SUZ; Ret	FUJ; 3	FUJ	AUT; 13	MOT; 13	10th	39
2013	Lamborghini Gallardo GT3	Y	GT300	87	(Japan) Hideki Yamauchi (Japan) Hiroki Yoshimoto	OKA; 3	FUJ; 7	SEP; Ret	SUG; 5	SUZ; Ret	FUJ; 20	FUJ	AUT; 10	MOT; 8	11th	39
2013	Lamborghini Gallardo GT3	Y	GT300	88	(Japan) Manabu Orido (Japan) Takayuki Aoki (Japan) Hideki Yamauchi (Japan) Hiroki Yoshimoto	OKA; Ret	FUJ; 12	SEP; 5	SUG; 18	SUZ; 4	FUJ; Ret	FUJ	AUT; 12	MOT; 5	12th	34
2014	Lamborghini Gallardo GT3	Y	GT300	86	(Japan) Shinya Hosokawa (Japan) Koji Yamanishi	OKA; 7	FUJ; Ret	AUT; 6	SUG; 6	FUJ; 3	SUZ; 17	BUR; Ret	MOT; 20		11th	37
2014	Lamborghini Gallardo GT3	Y	GT300	88	(Japan) Takayuki Aoki (Japan) Manabu Orido (Japan) Kazuki Hiramine	OKA; 11	FUJ; Ret	AUT; 11	SUG; 1	FUJ; 21	SUZ; 13	BUR; 18	MOT; 11		12th	35
2015	Lamborghini Gallardo GT3	Y	GT300	87	(Japan) Takayuki Aoki (Japan) Koji Yamanishi (Japan) Yoshitaka Kuroda (Japan) Kimiya Sato	OKA; 20	FUJ; Ret	CHA; Ret	FUJ; 11	SUZ; 24	SUG; 18	AUT; 11	MOT; 16		20th	10
2015	Lamborghini Gallardo GT3	Y	GT300	88	(Japan) Manabu Orido (Japan) Kazuki Hiramine (Japan) Kimiya Sato	OKA; Ret	FUJ; Ret	CHA; 17	FUJ; 7	SUZ; 4	SUG; 4	AUT; Ret	MOT; 7		12th	39
2016	Lamborghini Huracán GT3	Y	GT300	87	(Japan) Shinya Hosokawa (Japan) Kimiya Sato (Japan) Taiyo Iida	OKA; 13	FUJ; 8	SUG; 22	FUJ; 19	SUZ; 17	CHA; 21	MOT; 8	MOT; 11		17th	22
2016	Lamborghini Huracán GT3	Y	GT300	88	(Japan) Kazuki Hiramine (Japan) Manabu Orido	OKA; 9	FUJ; 25	SUG; 6	FUJ; 4	SUZ; 9	CHA; 10	MOT; 3	MOT; Ret		11th	47
2017	Lamborghini Huracán GT3	Y	GT300	87	(Japan) Shinya Hosokawa (Japan) Kimiya Sato (Japan) Yuya Motojima	OKA; 11	FUJ; 4	AUT; 18	SUG; 19	FUJ; 12	SUZ; 3	CHA; 12	MOT; 11		12th	41
2017	Lamborghini Huracán GT3	Y	GT300	88	(Japan) Manabu Orido (Japan) Kazuki Hiramine (Japan) Tsubasa Takahashi (Japan) Koji Yamanishi	OKA; 19	FUJ; 25	AUT; 16	SUG; Ret	FUJ; 7	SUZ; 2	CHA; 5	MOT; Ret		10th	44
2018	Lamborghini Huracán GT3	Y	GT300	87	(Japan) Yuya Motojima (Japan) Kimiya Sato	OKA; 12	FUJ; 16	SUZ; 12	CHA; 5	FUJ; Ret	SUG; 13	AUT; 2	MOT; 4		10th	50
2018	Lamborghini Huracán GT3	Y	GT300	88	(Japan) Kazuki Hiramine (Italy) Marco Mapelli (Italy) Andrea Caldarelli	**OKA**; 7	FUJ; 9	SUZ; 4	CHA; 6	FUJ; 6	SUG; 5	AUT; 13	**MOT**; 27		9th	51
2019	Lamborghini Huracán GT3; Lamborghini Huracán GT3 Evo	Y	GT300	87	(Japan) Tsubasa Takahashi (Macau) André Couto (Japan) Kiyoto Fujinami	OKA; 16	FUJ; 11	SUZ; 17	BUR; 7	FUJ; 1	AUT; Ret	SUG; 26	MOT; 23		8th	48
2019	Lamborghini Huracán GT3; Lamborghini Huracán GT3 Evo	Y	GT300	88	(Japan) Takashi Kogure (Japan) Yuya Motojima	OKA; 10	FUJ; 3	SUZ; 19	BUR; 5	FUJ; 5	AUT; 3	SUG; 20	MOT; 11		7th	58.5
2020	Lamborghini Huracán GT3 Evo	Y	GT300	87	(Japan) Tsubasa Takahashi (Japan) Shinnosuke Yamada	FUJ; 26	FUJ; 25	SUZ; 16	MOT; Ret	FUJ; 17	SUZ; 6	MOT; 26	FUJ; Ret		13th	34
2020	Lamborghini Huracán GT3 Evo	Y	GT300	88	(Japan) Takashi Kogure (Japan) Yuya Motojima	FUJ; 25	FUJ; 15	SUZ; 27	MOT; 2	FUJ; 6	SUZ; 13	MOT; Ret	FUJ; Ret		27th	18
2021	Lamborghini Huracán GT3 Evo	Y	GT300	87	(Japan) Kosuke Matsuura (Japan) Natsu Sakaguchi	OKA; 21	FUJ; 15	MOT; Ret	SUZ; 16	SUG; 4	AUT; 25	MOT; Ret	FUJ; 15		20th	25
2021	Lamborghini Huracán GT3 Evo	Y	GT300	88	(Japan) Takashi Kogure (Japan) Yuya Motojima	OKA; 9	FUJ; 6	MOT; 24	SUZ; 2	SUG; 7	AUT; 12	MOT; 4	FUJ; 23		9th	54
2022	Lamborghini Huracán GT3 Evo	Y	GT300	87	(Japan) Kosuke Matsuura (Japan) Natsu Sakaguchi	OKA; 8	FUJ; 12	SUZ; 16	FUJ; 8	SUZ; 9	SUG; 19	AUT; 11	MOT; 2		11th	43.5
2022	Lamborghini Huracán GT3 Evo	Y	GT300	88	(Japan) Takashi Kogure (Japan) Yuya Motojima	OKA; 17	FUJ; 5	SUZ; 5	FUJ; 9	SUZ; 17	SUG; 13	AUT; 4	MOT; 5		9th	45.5
2023	Lamborghini Huracán GT3 Evo; Lamborghini Huracán GT3 Evo2	Y	GT300	87	(Japan) Kosuke Matsuura (Japan) Natsu Sakaguchi	OKA; 7	FUJ; Ret	SUZ; 23	FUJ; 16	SUZ; 2	SUG; 19	AUT; 19	MOT; 21		14th	35
2023	Lamborghini Huracán GT3 Evo; Lamborghini Huracán GT3 Evo2	Y	GT300	88	(Japan) Takashi Kogure (Japan) Yuya Motojima	OKA; 24	FUJ; 6	SUZ; 21	FUJ; 8	SUZ; 4	SUG; 14	AUT; 7	MOT; 1		5th	61
2024	Lamborghini Huracán GT3 Evo; Lamborghini Huracán GT3 Evo2	Y	GT300	87	(Japan) Kosuke Matsuura (Japan) Natsu Sakaguchi	OKA; 7	FUJ; 8	SUZ; 21	FUJ; 6	SUG; 7	AUT; 13	MOT; 4	SUZ; Ret		10th	44
2024	Lamborghini Huracán GT3 Evo; Lamborghini Huracán GT3 Evo2	Y	GT300	88	(Japan) Takashi Kogure (Japan) Yuya Motojima	OKA; 8	**FUJ**; 1	SUZ; 20	FUJ; 5	SUG; 10	AUT; 1	MOT; 1	**SUZ**; 1		1st	113
2025	Lamborghini Huracán GT3 Evo2	Y	GT300	0	(Japan) Takashi Kogure (Japan) Yuya Motojima	OKA; 9	FUJ; Ret	SEP; 4	FS1; Ret	FS2; 11	SUZ; 7	SUG; 15	AUT; 3	MOT; 14	12th	72
2025	Lamborghini Huracán GT3 Evo2	Y	GT300	87	(Japan) Kosuke Matsuura (Japan) Natsu Sakaguchi	OKA; 7	FUJ; 25	SEP; 9	FS1; 21	FS2; 14	SUZ; 16	SUG; 18	AUT; 9	MOT; 11	15th	49
2026	Lamborghini Huracán GT3 Evo2	Y	GT300	87	(Japan) Yuya Motojima (Japan) Kosuke Matsuura	OKA; 15	FUJ1; 12	FUJ2; 25	SUZ; 29†	SUG; 7	AUT; 18	MOT1; 7	MOT2; 14		20th	45
2026	Lamborghini Huracán GT3 Evo2	Y	GT300	88	(Japan) Takashi Kogure (Italy) Daniil Kvyat	OKA; 6	FUJ1; 24	FUJ2; 17	SUZ; 6	SUG; 8	AUT; DSQ	MOT1; 3	MOT2; **1**		6th	88

=== 24 Hours of Le Mans results ===
Year	Entrant	No.	Car	Drivers	Class	Laps	Pos.	Class Pos.
2006	(Japan) JLOC Isao Noritake	53	Lamborghini Murciélago R-GT	(Italy) Marco Apicella (Japan) Yasutaka Hinoi (Japan) Koji Yamanishi	GT1	283	NC	NC
2007	(Japan) JLOC Isao Noritake	53	Lamborghini Murciélago R-GT	(Italy) Marco Apicella (Japan) Koji Yamanishi (Japan) Atsushi Yogo	GT1	1	DNF	DNF
2009	(Japan) JLOC	68	Lamborghini Murciélago R-GT	(Italy) Marco Apicella (Japan) Yutaka Yamagishi (Japan) Atsushi Yogo	GT1	1	DNF	DNF
2010	(Japan) JLOC	69	Lamborghini Murciélago LP670 R-SV	(Japan) Hiroyuki Iiri (Japan) Koji Yamanishi (Japan) Atsushi Yogo	GT1	138	DNF	DNF

=== Suzuka 1000 km results ===
Year	Entrant	No.	Tyres	Car	Drivers	Class	Laps	Pos.	Class Pos.	Series
1996	(Japan) Ken Wolf With JLOC Corsa	188	Y	Lamborghini Diablo Jota	(Japan) Takao Wada (Japan) Hideo Fukuyama (Italy) Luigi Moccia	GT1	144	28th	11th	BPR Global GT Series
2000	(Japan) JLOC	88	D	Lamborghini Diablo	(Japan) Naohiro Furuya (Japan) Tsuyoshi Takahashi (Japan) Hisashi Wada	GT500	162	3rd	3rd	Non-championship
2001	(Japan) Noritake Isao	88	D	Lamborghini Diablo	(Japan) Naohiro Furuya (Japan) Hisashi Wada (Japan) Yasutaka Hinoi	GT500	89	DNF	DNF	Non-championship
2002	(Japan) JLOC	88	D	Lamborghini Diablo	(Japan) Hisashi Wada (Italy) Marco Apicella (Japan) Naohiro Furuya*	GT500	39	DNF	DNF	Non-championship
2003	(Japan) JLOC	88	D	Lamborghini Diablo	(Japan) Koji Yamanishi (Japan) Hisashi Wada (Japan) Yasutaka Hinoi	GT500	155	8th	5th	Non-championship
2005	(Japan) JLOC	88	Y	Lamborghini Murciélago RG-1	(Japan) Koji Yamanishi (Japan) Naohiro Furuya (Japan) Yasutaka Hinoi	GT500	140	19th	3rd	Non-championship
2006	(Japan) JLOC	87	Y	Lamborghini Murciélago RG-1	(Japan) Koji Yamanishi (Japan) Atsushi Yogo (Japan) Hisashi Wada	GT300	120	28th	17th	Super GT
2006	(Japan) AKTIO JLOC	88	Y	Lamborghini Murciélago RG-1	(Italy) Marco Apicella (Japan) Yasutaka Hinoi (Japan) Naohiro Furuya	GT300	76	DNF	DNF	Super GT
2007	(Japan) JLOC	67	Y	Lamborghini Gallardo RG-3	(Japan) Hisashi Wada (Japan) Tsubasa Kurosawa (Japan) Naohiro Furuya	GT300	137	29th	17th	Super GT
2008	(Japan) triple a JLOC	66	Y	Lamborghini Murciélago RG-1	(Japan) Koji Yamanishi (Japan) Atsushi Yogo	GT300	136	29th	15th	Super GT
2008	(Japan) AKTIO JLOC	87	Y	Lamborghini Gallardo RG-3	(Japan) Hisashi Wada (Japan) Muneyuki Kurihara (Japan) Yoshihisa Namekata	GT300	145	27th	14th	Super GT
2008	(Japan) triple a JLOC	88	Y	Lamborghini Gallardo RG-3	(Japan) Hideshi Matsuda (Japan) Naohiro Furuya (Japan) Yuya Sakamoto	GT300	151	25th	12th	Super GT
2009	(Japan) triple a JLOC	66	Y	Lamborghini Murciélago RG-1	(Japan) Koji Yamanishi (Japan) Atsushi Yogo	GT300	94	28th	17th	Super GT
2009	(Japan) giraffa JLOC	87	Y	Lamborghini Gallardo RG-3	(Japan) Hisashi Wada (Japan) Hiroyuki Iiri	GT300	110	23rd	12th	Super GT
2009	(Japan) triple a JLOC	88	Y	Lamborghini Gallardo RG-3	(Japan) Yuya Sakamoto (Japan) Hideshi Matsuda	GT300	111	21st	10th	Super GT
2010	(Japan) JLOC	86	Y	Lamborghini Gallardo RG-3	(Japan) Yuhi Sekiguchi (Japan) Koji Yamanishi	GT300	110	16th	5th	Super GT
2010	(Japan) JLOC	87	Y	Lamborghini Gallardo RG-3	(Japan) Yuya Sakamoto (Japan) Hiroyuki Iiri (Japan) Naohiro Furuya	GT300	104	23rd	12th	Super GT
2010	(Japan) Rire Racing JLOC	88	Y	Lamborghini Gallardo RG-3	(Japan) Atsushi Yogo (Japan) Shinya Hosokawa	GT300	97	26th	15th	Super GT
2011	(Japan) JLOC	86	Y	Lamborghini Gallardo RG-3	(Japan) Yuya Sakamoto (Japan) Takayuki Aoki	GT300	77	24th	10th	Super GT
2011	(Japan) Rire Racing JLOC	87	Y	Lamborghini Gallardo RG-3	(Japan) Manabu Orido (Japan) Atsushi Yogo	GT300	79	17th	3rd	Super GT
2011	(Japan) JLOC	88	Y	Lamborghini Gallardo RG-3	(Japan) Hiroyuki Iiri (Japan) Yuhi Sekiguchi	GT300	76	29th	15th	Super GT
2012	(Japan) JLOC	85	Y	Lamborghini Gallardo RG-3	(Japan) Yuya Sakamoto (Japan) Ryohei Sakaguchi	GT300	155	20th	9th	Super GT
2012	(Japan) Verity BOMEX JLOC	86	Y	Lamborghini Gallardo RG-3	(Japan) Hideshi Matsuda (Japan) Junichiro Yamashita	GT300	88	DNF	DNF	Super GT
2012	(Japan) JLOC	87	Y	Lamborghini Gallardo GT3	(Japan) Hideki Yamauchi (Japan) Koji Yamanishi	GT300	25	DNF	DNF	Super GT
2012	(Japan) MonePa JLOC	88	Y	Lamborghini Gallardo GT3	(Japan) Manabu Orido (Japan) Takayuki Aoki (Japan) Keita Sawa	GT300	159	12th	3rd	Super GT
2013	(Japan) JLOC	86	Y	Lamborghini Gallardo GT3	(Japan) Shinya Hosokawa (Japan) Koji Yamanishi (Japan) Yuya Sakamoto	GT300	57	DNF	DNF	Super GT
2013	(Japan) JLOC	87	Y	Lamborghini Gallardo GT3	(Japan) Hideki Yamauchi (Japan) Hiroki Yoshimoto	GT300	105	DNF	DNF	Super GT
2013	(Japan) JLOC	88	Y	Lamborghini Gallardo GT3	(Japan) Takayuki Aoki (Japan) Manabu Orido	GT300	160	17th	4th	Super GT
2014	(Japan) JLOC	86	Y	Lamborghini Gallardo GT3	(Japan) Shinya Hosokawa (Japan) Koji Yamanishi	GT300	152	27th	17th	Super GT
2014	(Japan) JLOC	88	Y	Lamborghini Gallardo GT3	(Japan) Manabu Orido (Japan) Takayuki Aoki (Japan) Kazuki Hiramine	GT300	157	23rd	13th	Super GT
2015	(Japan) JLOC	87	Y	Lamborghini Gallardo GT3	(Japan) Takayuki Aoki (Japan) Koji Yamanishi (Japan) Yoshitaka Kuroda	GT300	105	37th	24th	Super GT
2015	(Japan) JLOC	88	Y	Lamborghini Gallardo GT3	(Japan) Manabu Orido (Japan) Kazuki Hiramine (Japan) Kimiya Sato	GT300	150	15th	4th	Super GT
2016	(Japan) JLOC	87	Y	Lamborghini Huracan GT3	(Japan) Shinya Hosokawa (Japan) Kimiya Satō (Japan) Taiyō Iida	GT300	157	29th	17th	Super GT
2016	(Japan) JLOC	88	Y	Lamborghini Huracan GT3	(Japan) Manabu Orido (Japan) Kazuki Hiramine	GT300	159	21st	9th	Super GT
2017	(Japan) JLOC	87	Y	Lamborghini Huracan GT3	(Japan) Shinya Hosokawa (Japan) Kimiya Satō (Japan) Yuya Motojima	GT300	158	16th	3rd	Super GT
2017	(Japan) JLOC	88	Y	Lamborghini Huracan GT3	(Japan) Manabu Orido (Japan) Kazuki Hiramine (Japan) Koji Yamanishi	GT300	158	15th	2nd	Super GT
2018	(Japan) JLOC	87	Y	Lamborghini Huracan GT3	(Japan) Taiyo Iida (Japan) Yuya Motojima (Japan) Kimiya Sato	P	273	17th	13th	Intercontinental GT Challenge
2018	(Japan) JLOC	88	Y	Lamborghini Huracan GT3	(Italy) Andrea Caldarelli (Japan) Kazuki Hiramine (Italy) Marco Mapelli	PA	273	15th	3rd	Intercontinental GT Challenge
2019	(Japan) JLOC	87	Y	Lamborghini Huracan GT3 Evo	(Japan) Takashi Kogure (Japan) Yuya Motojima (Japan) Yuhi Sekiguchi	P	272	16th	15th	Intercontinental GT Challenge
2019	(Japan) JLOC	88	Y	Lamborghini Huracan GT3 Evo	(Italy) Andrea Caldarelli (Denmark) Dennis Lind (Italy) Marco Mapelli	P	49	DNF	DNF	Intercontinental GT Challenge
