= 2010 Pokka GT Summer Special =

Sports car endurance race

2010 1000 km Suzuka

Seasons
- ← 2009 2011 →

Layout of the Suzuka International Racing Course

The 2010 Pokka GT Summer Special was the sixth round of the 2010 Super GT season and was the 39th running of the 1000 km Suzuka event, although like 2009, the race was only 700km in length. It took place on August 22, 2010.

== Race results ==
Results are as follows:

Pos	Class	No	Team	Drivers	Chassis	Tyre	Laps
1	GT500	8	Autobacs Racing Team Aguri	(Japan) Yuji Ide (Republic of Ireland) Ralph Firman (Japan) Takashi Kobayashi	Honda HSV-010 GT	B	121
2	GT500	23	Motul NISMO	(Japan) Satoshi Motoyama (France) Benoît Tréluyer	Nissan GT-R	M	121
3	GT500	100	Raybrig Team Kunimitsu	(Japan) Takuya Izawa (Japan) Naoki Yamamoto	Honda HSV-010 GT	B	121
4	GT500	17	Keihin Real Racing	(Japan) Koudai Tsukakoshi (Japan) Toshihiro Kaneishi	Honda HSV-010 GT	B	121
5	GT500	35	MJ Team KRAFT	(Japan) Hiroaki Ishiura (Japan) Kazuya Oshima	Lexus SC430	B	121
6	GT500	38	ZENT Team Cerumo	(Japan) Yuji Tachikawa (United Kingdom) Richard Lyons	Lexus SC430	B	120
7	GT500	32	EPSON Nakajima Racing	(Japan) Ryo Michigami (Japan) Yuhki Nakayama	Honda HSV-010 GT	D	120
8	GT500	39	Denso Team SARD	(Portugal) Andre Couto (Japan) Kohei Hirate	Lexus SC430	D	120
9	GT500	18	Weider Honda Racing	(Japan) Takashi Kogure (France) Loïc Duval	Honda HSV-010 GT	B	120
10	GT500	1	Petronas Team TOM'S	(Japan) Juichi Wakisaka (Germany) André Lotterer	Lexus SC430	B	120
11	GT500	6	ENEOS Team LeMans	(Japan) Daisuke Ito (Sweden) Björn Wirdheim	Lexus SC430	B	117
12	GT300	62	R&D Sport	(Japan) Kota Sasaki (Japan) Tetsuya Yamano	Subaru Legacy B4	Y	111
13	GT300	43	Autobacs Racing Team Aguri	(Japan) Shinichi Takagi (Japan) Morio Nitta (Japan) Kyosuke Mineo	ASL Garaiya	M	110
14	GT300	74	apr	(Japan) Yuji Kunimoto (Japan) Takuto Iguchi	Toyota Corolla Axio	M	110
15	GT300	19	WedsSport Team Bandoh	(Japan) Manabu Orido (Japan) Tatsuya Kataoka	Lexus IS350	Y	110
16	GT300	86	JLOC	(Japan) Yuhi Sekiguchi (Japan) Koji Yamanishi	Lamborghini Gallardo RG-3	Y	110
17	GT300	7	M7 Mutiara RE Amemiya	(Japan) Nobuteru Taniguchi (Japan) Ryo Orime	Mazda RX-7	Y	110
18	GT300	27	NAC LMP Motorsport	(Japan) Yutaka Yamagishi (Japan) Hiroshi Koizumi	Ferrari F430 GT2	Y	110
19	GT300	11	JIM Gainer Racing	(Japan) Tetsuya Tanaka (Japan) Katsuyuki Hiranaka	Ferrari F430 GT2	D	110
20	GT300	5	Team Mach	(Japan) Tetsuji Tamanaka (Japan) Haruki Kurosawa	Vemac RD408R	Y	109
21	GT300	9	Hatsune Miku Goodsmile Racing with COX	(Japan) Masahiro Sasaki (Japan) Taku Bamba (Japan) Mitsuhiro Kinoshita	Porsche 911 GT3 R	H	109
22	GT300	28	Iwasaki LMP Motorsport	(Japan) Yuki Iwasaki (Japan) Akihiro Asai	Porsche 996 GT3-RS	Y	107
23	GT300	87	JLOC	(Japan) Yuya Sakamoto (Japan) Hiroyuki Iiri (Japan) Naohiro Furuya	Lamborghini Gallardo RG-3	Y	104
24	GT300	22	R'Qs Motorsports	(Japan) Masaki Jyonai (Japan) Hisashi Wada (Japan) Ryohei Sakaguchi	Vemac RD350R	Y	103
25	GT300	365	365 ThunderAsia Racing	(Singapore) Melvin Choo (Japan) Keita Sawa (Japan) Shinsuke Yamazaki	Mosler MT900M	Y	98
26	GT300	88	Rire Racing JLOC	(Japan) Atsushi Yogo (Japan) Shinya Hosokawa (Japan) Yuya Sakamoto	Lamborghini Gallardo RG-3	Y	97
27	GT500	12	Calsonic Team Impul	(Japan) Tsugio Matsuda (Italy) Ronnie Quintarelli	Nissan GT-R	B	90
28	GT300	46	UpStart MOLA	(Japan) Naoki Yokomizo (Japan) Tsubasa Abe	Nissan Z	Y	90
29	GT300	666	Lian Bomex Rosso	(Japan) Junichiro Yamashita (Japan) Hiroshi Takamori (Japan) Satoshi Kimura	Porsche Boxster	Y	87
30	GT300	2	Apple K-one Cars Tokai Dream28	(Japan) Kazuho Takahashi (Japan) Hiroki Kato (Japan) Hiroshi Hamaguchi	Mooncraft Shiden	Y	86
DNF	GT300	3	Tomica Hasemi Motorsport	(Japan) Kazuki Hoshino (Japan) Masataka Yanagida	Nissan Z	Y	72
DNF	GT300	31	Evangelion-01 apr	(Japan) Koki Saga (Japan) Kosuke Matsuura (Japan) Yuya Sakamoto	Toyota Corolla Axio	Y	62
DNF	GT500	24	HIS Advan Kondo Racing	(Japan) Hironobu Yasuda (Brazil) João Paulo de Oliveira	Nissan GT-R	Y	59
DNF	GT300	25	ZENT Team Tsuchiya	(Japan) Takeshi Tsuchiya (Japan) Akihiro Tsuzuki (Japan) Yoshio Tsuzuki	Porsche 997 GT3-RSR	Y	50
DNF	GT300	26	Cinecitta Team Taisan	(Japan) Masayuki Ueda (Japan) Shogo Mitsuyama (Ukraine) Igor Sushko	Porsche 996 GT3	Y	47
DNF	GT300	66	A speed	(Japan) Hideshi Matsuda (Japan) Hiroki Yoshimoto (Japan) Tomonobu Fujii	Aston Martin V8 Vantage	Y	43

== Statistics ==
- GT500 Pole Position – #8 ARTA HSV-010 – 1:55.237
- GT300 Pole Position – #26 Taisan Porsche – 2:07.498
- GT500 Fastest Lap – #23 NISMO GT-R – 1:57.676
- GT300 Fastest Lap – #62 R&D Sport Subaru – 2:09.639
- Winner's Race Time – 4:07:10.085
