= 2009 Suzuka Pokka GT Summer Special =

Sports car endurance race

2009 1000 km Suzuka

Seasons
- ← 2008 2010 →

Layout of the Suzuka International Racing Course

The 2009 Suzuka Pokka GT Summer Special was the sixth round of the 2009 Super GT season and was the 38th running of the 1000 km Suzuka event, although for the first time since 1969, the race was not 1000 km in length as in a bid to reduce CO_{2} emissions, the race distance was shortented to 700 km. It took place on August 23, 2009.

== Race results ==
Results are as follows:

| Pos | Class | No | Team | Drivers | Chassis | Tyre | Laps |
|---|---|---|---|---|---|---|---|
| 1 | GT500 | 35 | Team KRAFT | (Japan) Hiroaki Ishiura (Japan) Kazuya Oshima | Lexus SC430 | B | 121 |
| 2 | GT500 | 3 | Tomica Hasemi Motorsports | (Japan) Hironobu Yasuda (Italy) Ronnie Quintarelli | Nissan GT-R | M | 121 |
| 3 | GT500 | 38 | ZENT Team Cerumo | (Japan) Yuji Tachikawa (United Kingdom) Richard Lyons | Lexus SC430 | B | 121 |
| 4 | GT500 | 18 | Rockstar Team Yoshiki and Dome Project | (Japan) Takashi Kogure (Japan) Ryo Michigami | Honda NSX | B | 121 |
| 5 | GT500 | 12 | Calsonic Team Impul | (Japan) Tsugio Matsuda (France) Sebastien Philippe | Nissan GT-R | B | 121 |
| 6 | GT500 | 1 | Motul NISMO | (Japan) Satoshi Motoyama (Germany) Michael Krumm | Nissan GT-R | B | 121 |
| 7 | GT500 | 39 | Denso Team SARD | (Portugal) Andre Couto (Japan) Kohei Hirate | Lexus SC430 | D | 121 |
| 8 | GT500 | 36 | Petronas Team TOM'S | (Japan) Juichi Wakisaka (Germany) André Lotterer | Lexus SC430 | B | 121 |
| 9 | GT500 | 100 | Raybrig Team Kunimitsu | (Japan) Yuji Ide (Japan) Shinya Hosokawa | Honda NSX | B | 121 |
| 10 | GT500 | 17 | Keihin Real Racing | (Japan) Koudai Tsukakoshi (Japan) Toshihiro Kaneishi (Japan) Katsutomo Kaneishi | Honda NSX | B | 120 |
| 11 | GT500 | 24 | HIS Advan Kondo Racing | (Japan) Seiji Ara (Brazil) João Paulo de Oliveira | Nissan GT-R | Y | 119 |
| 12 | GT300 | 46 | S-Road MOLA | (Japan) Kazuki Hoshino (Japan) Masataka Yanagida | Nissan Z | Y | 112 |
| 13 | GT300 | 43 | Autobacs Racing Team Aguri | (Japan) Shinichi Takagi (Japan) Morio Nitta | ASL Garaiya | M | 112 |
| 14 | GT300 | 2 | Apple K-one Cars Tokai Dream28 | (Japan) Hiroki Yoshimoto (Japan) Hiroki Kato | Mooncraft Shiden | Y | 112 |
| 15 | GT300 | 74 | apr | (Japan) Yuji Kunimoto (Japan) Takuto Iguchi | Toyota Corolla Axio | M | 112 |
| 16 | GT300 | 11 | JIM Gainer Racing | (Japan) Tetsuya Tanaka (Japan) Katsuyuki Hiranaka | Ferrari F430 GT2 | Y | 110 |
| 17 | GT300 | 19 | WedsSport Team Bandoh | (Japan) Manabu Orido (Japan) Tatsuya Kataoka | Lexus IS350 | Y | 112 |
| 18 | GT300 | 7 | M7 Mutiara RE Amemiya | (Japan) Nobuteru Taniguchi (Japan) Ryo Orime | Mazda RX-7 | Y | 112 |
| 19 | GT300 | 81 | Team Daishin | (Japan) Takayuki Aoki (Japan) Tomonobu Fujii (Japan) Koji Aoyama | Ferrari F430 GT2 | Y | 112 |
| 20 | GT300 | 52 | Team Shift | (Japan) Yuhi Sekiguchi (Japan) Naoya Yamano (Japan) Kota Sasaki | Lexus IS350 | K | 111 |
| 21 | GT300 | 88 | triple a JLOC | (Japan) Yuya Sakamoto (Japan) Hideshi Matsuda | Lamborghini Gallardo RG-3 | Y | 111 |
| 22 | GT300 | 55 | J-Trust Tomei Sports | (Japan) Yutaka Yamagishi (Japan) Hiroshi Koizumi | Porsche 997 GT3-RSR | Y | 110 |
| 23 | GT300 | 87 | giraffa JLOC | (Japan) Hisashi Wada (Japan) Hiroyuki Iiri | Lamborghini Gallardo RG-3 | Y | 110 |
| 24 | GT300 | 666 | FieLDS Bomex Rosso | (Japan) Junichiro Yamashita (Japan) Shogo Suho (Japan) Takashi Miyamoto | Vemac RD320R | K | 107 |
| 25 | GT300 | 4 | Lian Bomex Rosso | (Japan) Yoshihiro Ito (Japan) Michihito Uwazumi (Japan) Subaru Yamamoto | Porsche Boxster | K | 104 |
| 26 | GT300 | 10 | JIM Gainer Racing | (Japan) Masayuki Ueda (Japan) Masataka Kawaguchi | Ferrari 360 | Y | 103 |
| 27 | GT300 | 26 | UpStart Team Taisan | (Japan) Haruki Kurosawa (Japan) Tsubasa Abe (Japan) Katsuhiko Tsutsui | Porsche 996 GT3-RS | Y | 100 |
| 28 | GT300 | 66 | triple a JLOC | (Japan) Koji Yamanishi (Japan) Atsushi Yogo | Lamborghini Murcielago RG-1 | Y | 94 |
| 29 | GT300 | 31 | Avex apr | (Japan) Kyosuke Mineo (Japan) Hiroshi Takamori (Japan) Yuya Sakamoto | Toyota Corolla Axio | Y | 93 |
| 30 | GT500 | 8 | Autobacs Racing Team Aguri | (Japan) Takuya Izawa (Republic of Ireland) Ralph Firman | Honda NSX | B | 84 |
| DNF | GT500 | 6 | ENEOS Team LeMans | (Japan) Daisuke Ito (Sweden) Björn Wirdheim | Lexus SC430 | B | 64 |
| DNF | GT300 | 808 | Hatsune Miku Studie GLAD Racing | (Japan) Yasushi Kikuchi (Japan) Taku Bamba (Japan) Shozo Tagahara | BMW Z4 | Y | 60 |
| DNF | GT300 | 5 | Team Mach | (Japan) Tetsuji Tamanaka (Japan) Akazame Oyaji | Vemac RD320R | Y | 27 |
| DNF | GT500 | 32 | EPSON Nakajima Racing | (France) Loïc Duval (Japan) Yuhki Nakayama | Honda NSX | D | 12 |

== Statistics ==
- GT500 Pole Position – #35 KRAFT SC430 – 1:55.724
- GT300 Pole Position – #81 Daishin F430 – 2:07.439
- GT500 Fastest Lap – #35 KRAFT SC430 – 1:58.093
- GT300 Fastest Lap – #5 Team Mach Vemac – 2:09.282
- Winner's Race Time – 4:16:02.744
