= 2011 Pokka GT Summer Special =

Sports car endurance race

2011 1000 km Suzuka

Seasons
- ← 2010 2012 →

Layout of the Suzuka International Racing Course

The 2011 Pokka GT Summer Special was the fifth round of the 2011 Super GT season and despite the race being shortened to 500km following the 2011 Tōhoku earthquake and tsunami, this was the 40th running of the 1000 km Suzuka event. It took place on August 21, 2011.

== Race results ==
Results are as follows:

Pos	Class	No	Team	Drivers	Chassis	Tyre	Laps
1	GT500	1	Weider Honda Racing	(Japan) Takashi Kogure (France) Loïc Duval	Honda HSV-010 GT	B	86
2	GT500	46	S-Road MOLA	(Japan) Masataka Yanagida (Italy) Ronnie Quintarelli	Nissan GT-R	M	86
3	GT500	12	Calsonic Team Impul	(Japan) Tsugio Matsuda (Brazil) João Paulo de Oliveira	Nissan GT-R	B	86
4	GT500	23	Motul NISMO	(Japan) Satoshi Motoyama (France) Benoît Tréluyer	Nissan GT-R	B	86
5	GT500	39	Denso Team SARD	(Japan) Hiroaki Ishiura (Japan) Takuto Iguchi	Lexus SC430	M	86
6	GT500	36	Petronas Team TOM'S	(Japan) Kazuki Nakajima (Germany) André Lotterer	Lexus SC430	B	86
7	GT500	35	D'Station Team KRAFT	(Japan) Juichi Wakisaka (Portugal) Andre Couto	Lexus SC430	B	86
8	GT500	36	ENEOS Team LeMans	(Japan) Daisuke Ito (Japan) Kazuya Oshima	Lexus SC430	B	86
9	GT500	8	Autobacs Racing Team Aguri	(Japan) Hideki Mutoh (Japan) Takashi Kobayashi	Honda HSV-010 GT	B	86
10	GT500	24	Advan Kondo Racing	(Japan) Hironobu Yasuda (Sweden) Björn Wirdheim	Nissan GT-R	Y	84
11	GT500	19	WedsSport Team Bandoh	(Japan) Seiji Ara (Japan) Tatsuya Kataoka	Lexus SC430	Y	83
12	GT500	17	Keihin Real Racing	(Japan) Koudai Tsukakoshi (Japan) Toshihiro Kaneishi	Honda HSV-010 GT	B	83
13	GT500	32	EPSON Nakajima Racing	(Japan) Ryo Michigami (Japan) Yuhki Nakayama	Honda HSV-010 GT	D	81
14	GT500	38	ZENT Team Cerumo	(Japan) Yuji Tachikawa (Japan) Kohei Hirate	Lexus SC430	B	81
15	GT300	62	R&D Sport	(Japan) Kota Sasaki (Japan) Tetsuya Yamano	Subaru Legacy B4	Y	79
16	GT300	33	Hankook KTR	(Japan) Masami Kageyama (Japan) Tomonobu Fujii	Porsche 911 GT3 R	H	79
17	GT300	87	RIRE Racing JLOC	(Japan) Manabu Orido (Japan) Atsushi Yogo	Lamborghini Gallardo RG-3	Y	79
18	GT300	11	JIM Gainer Racing	(Japan) Tetsuya Tanaka (Japan) Katsuyuki Hiranaka	Ferrari 458 GTC	D	78
19	GT300	4	Hatsune Miku Goodsmile Racing	(Japan) Nobuteru Taniguchi (Japan) Taku Bamba	BMW Z4 GT3	Y	78
20	GT300	2	Evangelion-01 Cars Tokai Dream28	(Japan) Kazuho Takahashi (Japan) Hiroki Kato	Mooncraft Shiden	Y	78
21	GT300	74	apr	(Japan) Yuji Kunimoto (Japan) Morio Nitta	Toyota Corolla Axio	Y	78
22	GT300	14	Team SG Changi	(Japan) Ryo Orime (Switzerland) Alexandre Imperatori	Lexus IS350	Y	78
23	GT300	25	ZENT Team Tsuchiya	(Japan) Takeshi Tsuchiya (Japan) Akihiro Tsuzuki	Porsche 997 GT3-RSR	Y	78
24	GT300	86	JLOC	(Japan) Yuya Sakamoto (Japan) Takayuki Aoki	Lamborghini Gallardo RG-3	Y	77
25	GT300	27	NAC Ika Musume LMP Motorsport	(Japan) Yutaka Yamagishi (Japan) Hideki Yamauchi	Ferrari F430 GT2	Y	77
26	GT300	66	A speed	(Japan) Kazuki Hoshino (Japan) Hiroki Yoshimoto	Aston Martin Vantage GT2	Y	77
27	GT300	21	Hasepro apr	(Japan) Koki Saga (Japan) Yuki Iwasaki	Toyota Corolla Axio	Y	76
28	GT300	26	Verity Team Taisan	(Japan) Kyosuke Mineo (Japan) Shogo Mitsuyama (Japan) Junichiro Yamashita	Porsche 996 GT3	Y	76
29	GT300	88	JLOC	(Japan) Hiroyuki Iiri (Japan) Yuhi Sekiguchi	Lamborghini Gallardo RG-3	Y	76
30	GT300	33	Team Art Taste	(Japan) Yasuhiro Shimizu (Germany) Tim Bergmeister	Porsche 911 GT3 R	Y	76
31	GT300	41	NetMove Team Taisan	(Japan) Shinichi Yamaji (Japan) Hiroshi Koizumi	Ferrari F430 GT2	Y	76
32	GT300	69	ThunderAsia Racing	(Singapore) Melvin Choo (Japan) Hiroki Yoshida (Japan) Naoki Yokomizo	Mosler MT900M	Y	75
33	GT300	22	R'Qs Motorsports	(Japan) Masaki Jyonai (Japan) Hisashi Wada	Vemac RD350R	Y	73
34	GT300	43	Autobacs Racing Team Aguri	(Japan) Shinichi Takagi (Japan) Kosuke Matsuura	ASL Garaiya	B	60
DNF	GT300	2	Evangelion-02 Direction Racing	(Japan) Akira Mizutani (Netherlands) Carlo van Dam (Japan) You Yokomaku	Porsche 911 GT3 R	Y	53
DNF	GT300	34	Haruhi Racing Hankook KTR	(Japan) Hiroshi Takamori (United States) Michael Kim (Japan) Naoya Gamou	Porsche 997 GT3 RS	H	51
DNF	GT300	5	Team Mach	(Japan) Tetsuji Tamanaka (Japan) Haruki Kurosawa	Vemac RD320R	Y	42
DNF	GT500	100	Raybrig Team Kunimitsu	(Japan) Takuya Izawa (Japan) Naoki Yamamoto	Honda HSV-010 GT	B	41

Note: The race ended after 86 of the scheduled 87 laps due to reaching the time limit of 6:30pm. Full points were awarded in Super GT rankings.

== Statistics ==
- GT500 Pole Position – #46 MOLA GT-R – 2:08.206
- GT300 Pole Position – #43 ARTA Garaiya – 2:20.696
- GT500 Fastest Lap – #46 MOLA GT-R – 1:59.923
- GT300 Fastest Lap – #62 R&D Sport Subaru – 2:09.877
- Winner's Race Time – 3:16:09.255
