= 2012 41st International Pokka 1000km =

Sports car endurance race

2012 1000 km Suzuka

Seasons
- ← 2011 2013 →

Layout of the Suzuka International Racing Course

The 41st International Pokka 1000km was the fifth round of the 2012 Super GT season and the 41st running of the 1000 km Suzuka. It took place on August 19, 2012.

== Race results ==
| Pos | Class | No | Team | Drivers | Chassis | Tyre | Time/Difference | Laps |
|---|---|---|---|---|---|---|---|---|
| 1 | GT500 | 1 | S-Road REITO MOLA | (Japan) Masataka Yanagida (Italy) Ronnie Quintarelli | Nissan GT-R | M | 5:59:01.662 | 173 |
| 2 | GT500 | 35 | LEXUS TEAM KeePer KRAFT | (Japan) Yuji Kunimoto (Italy) Andrea Caldarelli | Lexus SC430 | B | +15.076 | 173 |
| 3 | GT500 | 24 | D'Station ADVAN KONDO RACING | (Japan) Hironobu Yasuda (Sweden) Björn Wirdheim | Nissan GT-R | Y | +16.583 | 173 |
| 4 | GT500 | 12 | CALSONIC TEAM Impul | (Japan) Tsugio Matsuda (Brazil) João Paulo de Oliveira | Nissan GT-R | B | +17.206 | 173 |
| 5 | GT500 | 23 | MOTUL AUTECH NISMO | (Japan) Satoshi Motoyama (Germany) Michael Krumm | Nissan GT-R | B | +30.543 | 173 |
| 6 | GT500 | 19 | Lexus Team WedsSport Bandoh | (Japan) Seiji Ara (Portugal) Andre Couto | Lexus SC430 | Y | +31.549 | 173 |
| 7 | GT500 | 8 | Autobacs Racing Team Aguri | (Japan) Takashi Kobayashi (Republic of Ireland) Ralph Firman | Honda HSV-010 GT | B | +1 Lap | 172 |
| 8 | GT500 | 18 | Weider Honda Racing | (Japan) Takashi Kogure (Netherlands) Carlo van Dam | Honda HSV-010 GT | B | +1 Lap | 172 |
| 9 | GT500 | 38 | Lexus Team ZENT Cerumo | (Japan) Yuji Tachikawa (Japan) Kohei Hirate | Lexus SC430 | B | +3 Laps | 170 |
| 10 | GT300 | 66 | A speed | (Japan) Hiroki Yoshimoto (Japan) Kazuki Hoshino (Japan) Hiroki Yoshida | Aston Martin V12 Vantage GT3 | Y | 5:59'30.406 | 160 |
| 11 | GT300 | 3 | S-Road NDDP | (Japan) Katsumasa Chiyo (Japan) Yuhi Sekiguchi (Japan) Daiki Sasaki | Nissan GT-R GT3 | Y | +53.633 | 160 |
| 12 | GT300 | 88 | MonePa JLOC | (Japan) Manabu Orido (Japan) Takayuki Aoki (Japan) Keita Sawa | Lamborghini Gallardo GT3 | Y | +1 Lap | 159 |
| 13 | GT300 | 43 | Autobacs Racing Team Aguri | (Japan) Kosuke Matsuura (Japan) Shinichi Takagi | ASL Garaiya | B | +2 Laps | 158 |
| 14 | GT300 | 11 | Gainer | (Japan) Tetsuya Tanaka (Japan) Katsuyuki Hiranaka (Japan) Atsushi Yogo | Audi R8 LMS ultra | D | +2 Laps | 158 |
| 15 | GT300 | 33 | Hankook KTR | (Japan) Masami Kageyama (Japan) Tomonobu Fujii | Porsche 911 GT3-R | H | +3 Laps | 157 |
| 16 | GT300 | 4 | GSR Project Mirai | (Japan) Taku Bamba (Japan) Masahiro Sasaki | BMW Z4 GT3 | Y | +3 Laps | 157 |
| 17 | GT300 | 27 | NAC Ika Musume LMP Motorsport | (Japan) Takuto Iguchi (Japan) Yutaka Yamagishi | Ferrari F430 GTC | Y | +3 Laps | 157 |
| 18 | GT500 | 17 | Keihin Real Racing | (Japan) Toshihiro Kaneishi (Japan) Koudai Tsukakoshi | Honda HSV-010 GT | B | +17 Laps | 156 |
| 19 | GT300 | 30 | Iwasaki Moda apr | (Japan) Yuki Iwasaki (Japan) Yuya Sakamoto (Japan) Kenji Kobayashi | Audi R8 LMS ultra | Y | +5 Laps | 155 |
| 20 | GT300 | 85 | JLOC | (Japan) Yuya Sakamoto (Japan) Ryohei Sakaguchi | Lamborghini Gallardo RG-3 | Y | +5 Laps | 155 |
| 21 | GT500 | 100 | Raybrig Team Kunimitsu | (Japan) Takuya Izawa (Japan) Naoki Yamamoto | Honda HSV-010 GT | B | +20 Laps | 153 |
| 22 | GT300 | 16 | Team MUGEN | (Japan) Hideki Muto (Japan) Daisuke Nakajima | Honda CR-Z | B | +10 Laps | 150 |
| 23 | GT300 | 22 | R'Qs Motorsports | (Japan) Masaki Jyonai (Japan) Hisashi Wada | Vemac RD350R | Y | +11 Laps | 149 |
| 24 | GT300 | 14 | Team SGC | (Japan) Ryo Orime (Switzerland) Alexandre Imperatori | Lexus IS350 | Y | +14 Laps | 146 |
| 25 | GT300 | 21 | ZENT Hitotsuyama Racing | (Japan) Akihiro Tsuzuki (Switzerland) Cyndie Allemann (United Kingdom) Richard Lyons | Audi R8 LMS | Y | +16 Laps | 144 |
| 26 | GT300 | 2 | Evangelion-01 Cars Tokai Dream28 | (Japan) Kazuho Takahashi (Japan) Hiroki Kato (Japan) Hiroshi Hamaguchi | Mooncraft Shiden | Y | +16 Laps | 144 |
| 27 | GT300 | 48 | NEON Dijon Racing | (Japan) Shogo Mitsuyama (Japan) Hiroshi Takamori (Japan) Keiichi Inoue | Callaway Corvette Z06.R GT3 | Y | +36 Laps | 124 |
| DNF | GT300 | 61 | R&D Sport | (Japan) Tetsuya Yamano (Japan) Kota Sasaki | Subaru BRZ | Y | +68 Laps | 92 |
| DNF | GT300 | 911 | Team Taisan ENDLESS | (Japan) Kyosuke Mineo (Japan) Naoki Yokomizo | Porsche 911 GT3-R | Y | +69 Laps | 91 |
| DNF | GT300 | 86 | Verity BOMEX JLOC | (Japan) Hideshi Matsuda (Japan) Junichiro Yamashita | Lamborghini Gallardo RG-3 | Y | +72 Laps | 88 |
| DNF | GT500 | 39 | Lexus Team DENSO SARD | (Japan) Hiroaki Ishiura (Japan) Juichi Wakisaka | Lexus SC430 | M | +92 Laps | 81 |
| DNF | GT300 | 52 | Green Tec & Leon with Shift | (Japan) Haruki Kurosawa (Japan) Hironori Takeuchi (Japan) Akihiko Nakaya | Mercedes-Benz SLS AMG GT3 | Y | +108 Laps | 52 |
| DNF | GT500 | 6 | Lexus Team ENEOS LeMans | (Japan) Daisuke Ito (Japan) Kazuya Oshima | Lexus SC430 | B | +123 Laps | 50 |
| DNF | GT500 | 32 | EPSON Nakajima Racing | (Japan) Ryo Michigami (Japan) Yuhki Nakayama | Honda HSV-010 GT | D | +139 Laps | 34 |
| DNF | GT300 | 0 | GSR Hatsune Miku | (Japan) Nobuteru Taniguchi (Japan) Tatsuya Kataoka | BMW Z4 GT3 | Y | +126 Laps | 34 |
| DNF | GT300 | 87 | JLOC | (Japan) Hideki Yamauchi (Japan) Koji Yamanishi | Lamborghini Gallardo GT3 | Y | +125 Laps | 25 |
| DNF | GT300 | 31 | Hasepro apr | (Japan) Koki Saga (Japan) Morio Nitta (Japan) Yuichi Nakayama | Toyota Prius | Y | +141 Laps | 19 |
| DNF | GT500 | 36 | Lexus Team Petronas TOM'S | (Japan) Kazuki Nakajima (France) Loïc Duval | Lexus SC430 | B | +164 Laps | 9 |
| DNF | GT300 | 99 | Racerbook Hitotsuyama Racing | (Japan) Yoshio Tsuzuki (Japan) Hideto Yasuoka (United States) Michael Kim | Audi R8 LMS | Y | +155 Laps | 5 |
| DNF | GT300 | 5 | Team Mach | (Japan) Masayuki Ueda (Japan) Tetsuji Tamanaka | Ferrari 458 Italia GT3 | Y | +156 Laps | 4 |
