= 2009 1000 km of Okayama =

2009 Asian Le Mans Series

Seasons
- ← none 2013 →

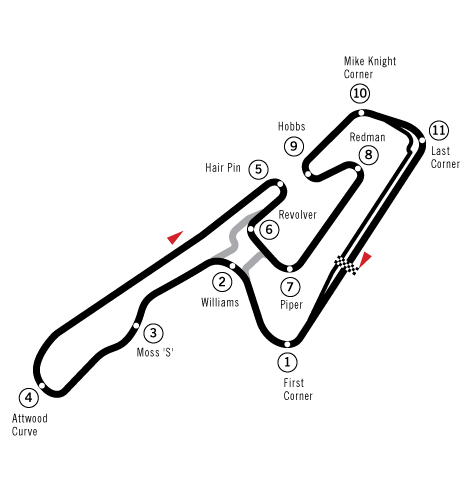
Layout of the Okayama International Circuit

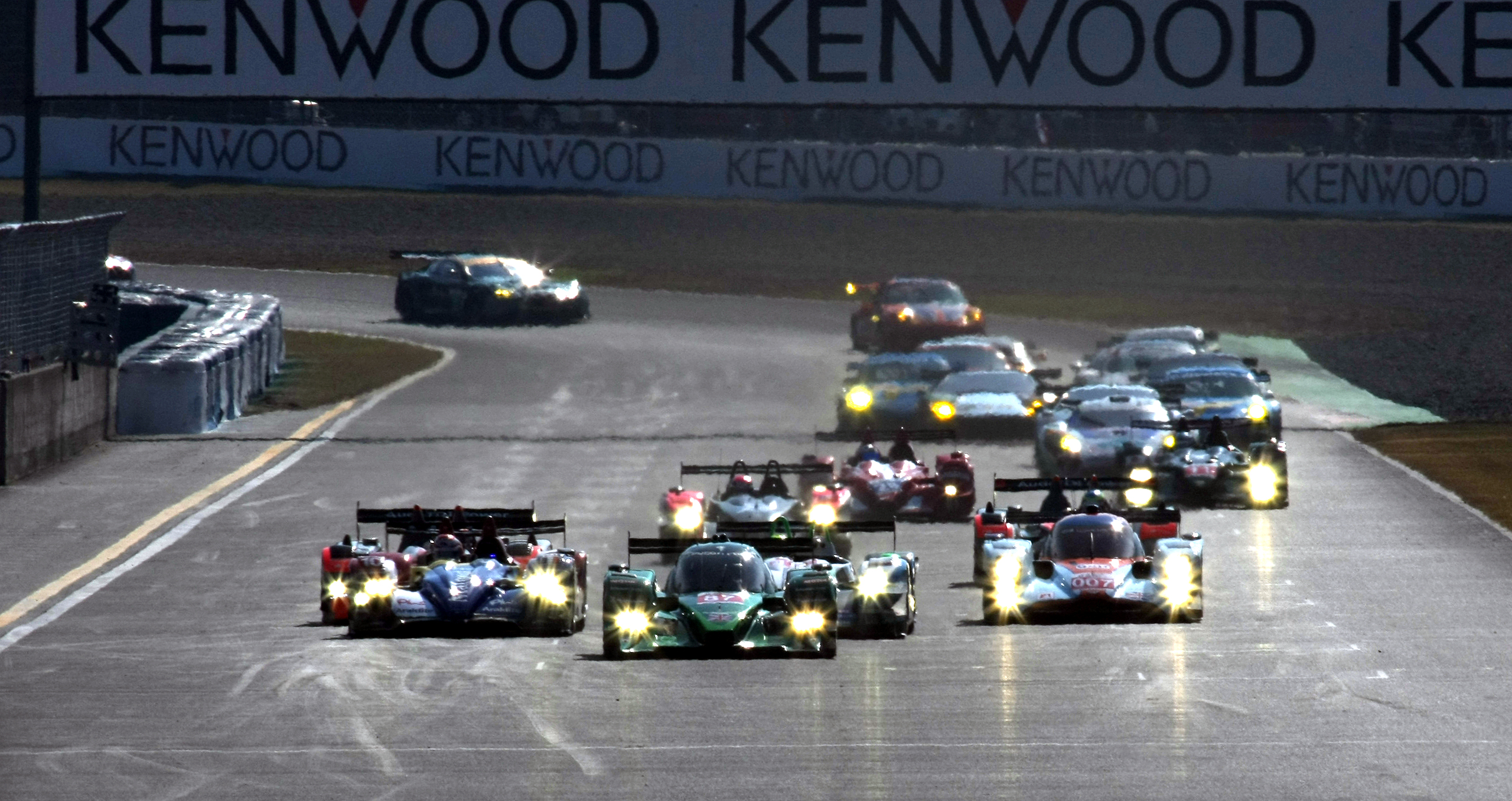
The start of the 2009 1000km of Okayama (Race 1).

The 2009 1000 km of Okayama was the inaugural event of Automobile Club de l'Ouest's (ACO) Asian Le Mans Series. It was held at the Okayama International Circuit, Japan and featured two 500 km races held on 30 October and 1 November 2009. The winning teams in each of the four categories earned an automatic invitation to the 2010 24 Hours of Le Mans. A second Asian Le Mans Series event, scheduled for the Shanghai International Circuit, China, on 7 and 8 November was cancelled by the ACO due to economic circumstances. The race weekend is being shared with the World Touring Car Championship's Race of Japan.

== Entries ==
The ACO's initial plans for the debut event of the Asian Le Mans Series was for a minimum of 30 entries. On 9 May 2009 the ACO announced an initial entry of 31 teams which would consist of competitors from the Le Mans Series, American Le Mans Series, FIA GT Championship, Super GT, as well as other local Japanese and Chinese teams. The ACO agreed to supply applying teams with freight transport in an attempt to lure further entries.

A second entry list was published on 1 September and included 23 cars. The final entry list is led by Europeans in the LMP1 category featuring Pescarolo Sport entered under the Sora Racing title, two Kolles Audis, an Le Mans Series-champion Aston Martin, one Oreca, and the new Drayson Lola. The sole Japanese entrant in the category was from Tōkai University/YGK Power, who last competed at the 2007 24 Hours of Le Mans. LMP2 features a mere two entries, both from the Le Mans Series. OAK Racing enters their Mazda-powered Pescarolo while Ibañez Racing Service enters their Courage-AER for a shot at a Le Mans invitation.

Entries in the GT1 category were predominantly Japanese, all of which are teams currently entered in the Super GT series. Hitotsuyama Team Nova's Aston Martin was joined by the experienced JLOC Lamborghinis. The sole European entry was the Larbre Compétition Saleen. In GT2 there were a variety of entries and cars, led by the first entries from the American Le Mans Series: Rahal Letterman Racing brought one of their new BMW M3s while Robertson Racing represents Ford. Felbermayr-Proton's two Porsches and Team Farnbacher's Hankook-shod Ferrari were entered from the Le Mans Series, while Hankook-KTR, Team Daishin, and JimGainer came from Super GT. Scuderia Forme also entered their Porsche 996 which had previously competed in the Japan Le Mans Challenge. A lone Chinese entry came in the form of an Aston Martin for Team Hong Kong Racing.

The top two teams from the 2009 Formula Le Mans Cup series were to also receive free entries for the event, but a scheduling conflict with the new Formula Le Mans Winter Series prevented teams from participating.

== Qualifying ==
Jonny Cocker led the field in the Drayson Lola-Judd, earning the first pole position for himself and the team. A tenth of a second behind was Christophe Tinseau in the Sora Pescarolo 01, while Nicolas Lapierre was a further three tenths of a second behind for Oreca. Mathieu Laheye was the victor amongst the two LMP2 cars, beating the Ibañez Courage by three seconds.

GT1 was led by the local Hitotsuyama Team Nova Aston Martin of Takeshi Tsuchiya, but the car was later disqualified for a rear wing violation. This gave the Larbre Saleen pole position in the category, ahead of the two JLOC Lamborghinis. A similar story in GT2 featured the Team Hong Kong Aston Martin initially setting the fastest time but later being disqualified for the same rule violation. Marc Lieb's Felbermayr-Proton Porsche thus was promoted to pole position, leading the JimGainer Ferrari and the second Felbermayr-Proton entry. The two disqualified Aston Martins will be required to start from the back of the grid.

=== Qualifying result ===
Pole position winners in each class are marked in bold. The qualifying positions will set the starting grid for both races.

Pos	Class	Team	Qualifying Driver	Lap Time
1	**LMP1**	**No. 87 Drayson Racing**	**Jonny Cocker**	**1:19.143**
2	LMP1	No. 17 Sora Racing	Christophe Tinseau	1:19.249
3	LMP1	No. 10 Team Oreca Matmut AIM	Nicolas Lapierre	1:19.548
4	LMP1	No. 007 Aston Martin Racing	Stefan Mücke	1:19.747
5	LMP1	No. 14 Kolles	Christijan Albers	1:20.165
6	LMP1	No. 15 Kolles	Oliver Jarvis	1:20.297
7	**LMP2**	**No. 24 OAK Racing**	**Matthieu Lahaye**	**1:23.790**
8	LMP1	No. 11 Tōkai University/YGK Power	Shogo Mitsuyama	1:25.847
9	LMP2	No. 29 Ibañez Racing Service	José Ibañez	1:26.647
10	**GT1**	**No. 50 Larbre Compétition**	**Carlo van Dam**	**1:29.827**
11	GT1	No. 69 JLOC	Hiroyuki Iiri	1:30.679
12	**GT2**	**No. 77 Team Felbermayr-Proton**	**Marc Lieb**	**1:30.847**
13	GT1	No. 68 JLOC	Koji Yamanishi	1:30.873
14	GT2	No. 85 JimGainer Racing	Tetsuya Tanaka	1:31.283
15	GT2	No. 88 Team Felbermayr-Proton	Marco Holzer	1:31.515
16	GT2	No. 92 BMW Rahal Letterman Racing	Dirk Müller	1:31.665
17	GT2	No. 71 Team Daishin	Takayuki Aoki	1:31.733
18	GT2	No. 40 Robertson Racing	David Murry	1:31.746
19	GT2	No. 89 Hankook Team Farnbacher	Allan Simonsen	1:31.977
20	GT2	No. 98 Hankook KTR	Masami Kageyama	1:32.258
21	GT2	No. 81 Scuderia Forme	Tadakazu Kojima	1:39.442
22	GT1	No. 61 Hitotsuyama Team Nova	Takeshi Tsuchiya	Disallowed
23	GT2	No. 91 Team Hong Kong Racing	Tomáš Enge	Disallowed

== Race One ==
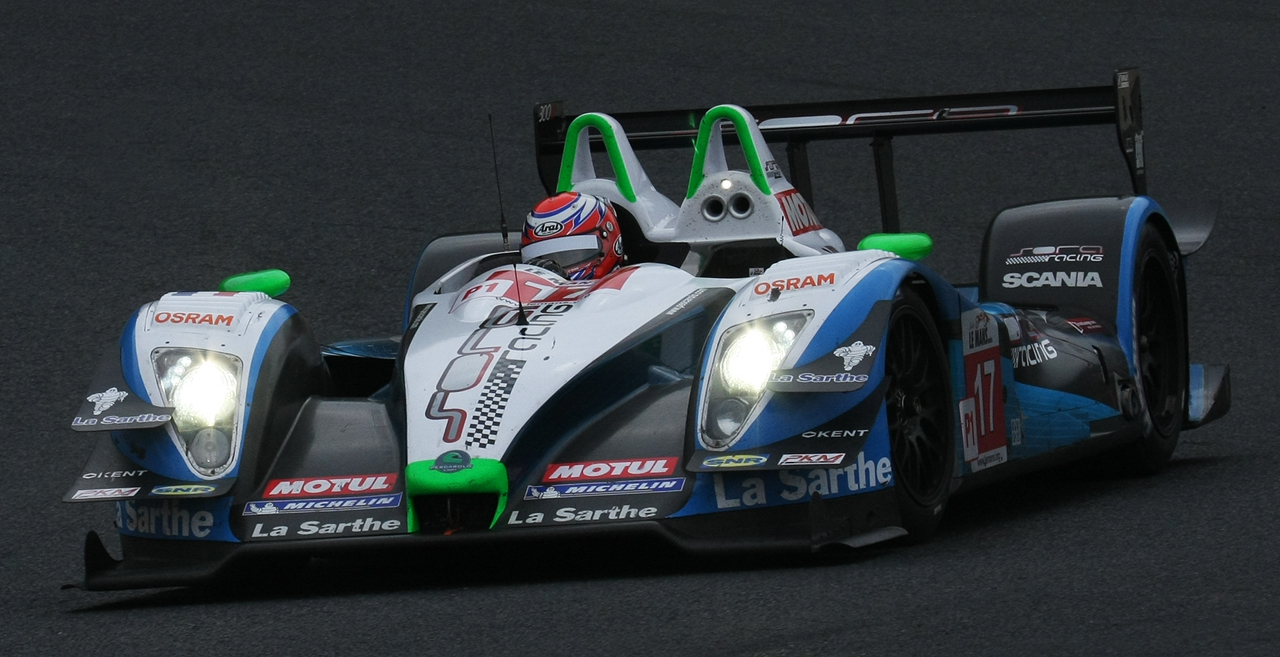
Shinji Nakano driving the Sora Racing car to victory in Race One

The first 500 km race was led early by Jonny Cocker in the Drayson Lola-Judd before Cocker was forced to pit for headlight repairs, dropping him several laps behind the leaders. The Aston Martin Racing entry led for much of the three hours before being forced to make an extra pit stop for fuel in the closing minutes, allowing the Sora Pescarolo to win the first race of the weekend. Drivers Christophe Tinseau and Shinji Nakano led the second place Oreca by a margin of 6.9 seconds at the finish, while the third place No. 15 Kolles Audi was two laps behind in third. OAK Racing won the LMP2 category by 22 seconds over their only other competitor.

In the GT1 class it was the Japanese teams which dominated as JLOC's No. 69 Lamborghini won the category by fifteen seconds over the Hitotsuyama Team Nova Aston Martin. The Larbre Saleen and second JLOC Lamborghini failed to finish the race. GT2 was led by the American entry from Rahal Letterman BMW, finishing three tenths of a second ahead of European Felbermayr-Proton Porsche and Farnbacher Ferrari.

=== Race result ===
Class winners in bold. Cars failing to complete 70% of winner's distance are marked as Not Classified (NC).

Pos	Class	No	Team	Drivers	Chassis	Tyre	Laps
Pos	Class	No	Team	Drivers	Engine	Tyre	Laps
1	**LMP1**	**17**	**(France) Sora Racing**	**(France) Christophe Tinseau (Japan) Shinji Nakano**	**Pescarolo 01**	M	**126**
1	**LMP1**	**17**	**(France) Sora Racing**	**(France) Christophe Tinseau (Japan) Shinji Nakano**	**Judd GV5.5 S2 5.5 L V10**	M	**126**
2	LMP1	10	(France) Team Oreca Matmut AIM	(France) Nicolas Lapierre (France) Loïc Duval	Oreca 01	M	126
2	LMP1	10	(France) Team Oreca Matmut AIM	(France) Nicolas Lapierre (France) Loïc Duval	AIM YS5.5 5.5 L V10	M	126
3	LMP1	15	(Germany) Kolles	(Denmark) Christian Bakkerud (United Kingdom) Oliver Jarvis	Audi R10 TDI	M	125
3	LMP1	15	(Germany) Kolles	(Denmark) Christian Bakkerud (United Kingdom) Oliver Jarvis	Audi TDI 5.5 L Turbo V12 (Diesel)	M	125
4	LMP1	007	(United Kingdom) Aston Martin Racing	(Switzerland) Harold Primat (Germany) Stefan Mücke	Lola-Aston Martin B09/60	M	124
4	LMP1	007	(United Kingdom) Aston Martin Racing	(Switzerland) Harold Primat (Germany) Stefan Mücke	Aston Martin 6.0 L V12	M	124
5	LMP1	14	(Germany) Kolles	(Netherlands) Christijan Albers (Italy) Matteo Cressoni (Japan) Hideki Noda	Audi R10 TDI	M	122
5	LMP1	14	(Germany) Kolles	(Netherlands) Christijan Albers (Italy) Matteo Cressoni (Japan) Hideki Noda	Audi TDI 5.5 L Turbo V12 (Diesel)	M	122
6	LMP1	87	(United Kingdom) Drayson Racing	(United Kingdom) Paul Drayson (United Kingdom) Jonny Cocker	Lola B09/60	M	121
6	LMP1	87	(United Kingdom) Drayson Racing	(United Kingdom) Paul Drayson (United Kingdom) Jonny Cocker	Judd GV5.5 S2 5.5 L V10	M	121
7	**LMP2**	**24**	**OAK Racing; Team Mazda France**	**(France) Jacques Nicolet (France) Matthieu Lahaye (Monaco) Richard Hein**	**Pescarolo 01**	D	**116**
7	**LMP2**	**24**	**OAK Racing; Team Mazda France**	**(France) Jacques Nicolet (France) Matthieu Lahaye (Monaco) Richard Hein**	**Mazda MZR-R 2.0 L Turbo I4**	D	**116**
8	LMP2	28	(France) Ibañez Racing Service	(France) José Ibañez (France) Damien Toullemonde (France) Frédéric Da Rocha	Courage LC75	D	116
8	LMP2	28	(France) Ibañez Racing Service	(France) José Ibañez (France) Damien Toullemonde (France) Frédéric Da Rocha	AER P07 2.0 L Turbo I4	D	116
9	LMP1	11	(Japan) Tōkai University (Japan) YGK Power	(Japan) Shogo Mitsuyama (Japan) Shigekazu Wakisaka	Courage-Oreca LC70	Y	115
9	LMP1	11	(Japan) Tōkai University (Japan) YGK Power	(Japan) Shogo Mitsuyama (Japan) Shigekazu Wakisaka	YGK YR40T 4.0 L Turbo V8	Y	115
10	**GT1**	**69**	**(Japan) JLOC**	**(Japan) Atsushi Yogo (Japan) Hiroyuki Iiri**	**Lamborghini Murciélago R-GT**	Y	**113**
10	**GT1**	**69**	**(Japan) JLOC**	**(Japan) Atsushi Yogo (Japan) Hiroyuki Iiri**	**Lamborghini 6.0 L V12**	Y	**113**
11	**GT2**	**92**	**(United States) BMW Rahal Letterman Racing**	**(United States) Tommy Milner (Germany) Dirk Müller**	**BMW M3 GT2**	D	**113**
11	**GT2**	**92**	**(United States) BMW Rahal Letterman Racing**	**(United States) Tommy Milner (Germany) Dirk Müller**	**BMW 4.0 L V8**	D	**113**
12	GT2	77	(Germany) Team Felbermayr-Proton	(Germany) Marc Lieb (Germany) Wolf Henzler	Porsche 997 GT3-RSR	M	113
12	GT2	77	(Germany) Team Felbermayr-Proton	(Germany) Marc Lieb (Germany) Wolf Henzler	Porsche 4.0 L Flat-6	M	113
13	GT1	61	(Japan) Hitotsuyama Team Nova	(Japan) Akihiro Tsuzuki (Japan) Takeshi Tsuchiya	Aston Martin DBR9	Y	113
13	GT1	61	(Japan) Hitotsuyama Team Nova	(Japan) Akihiro Tsuzuki (Japan) Takeshi Tsuchiya	Aston Martin 6.0 L V12	Y	113
14	GT2	89	(Germany) Hankook Team Farnbacher	(Germany) Dominik Farnbacher (Denmark) Allan Simonsen	Ferrari F430 GT2	H	113
14	GT2	89	(Germany) Hankook Team Farnbacher	(Germany) Dominik Farnbacher (Denmark) Allan Simonsen	Ferrari 4.0 L V8	H	113
15	GT2	88	(Germany) Team Felbermayr-Proton	(Germany) Christian Ried (Germany) Marco Holzer	Porsche 997 GT3-RSR	M	112
15	GT2	88	(Germany) Team Felbermayr-Proton	(Germany) Christian Ried (Germany) Marco Holzer	Porsche 4.0 L Flat-6	M	112
16	GT2	85	(Japan) JimGainer Racing	(Japan) Tetsuya Tanaka (Japan) Katsuyuki Hiranaka	Ferrari F430 GT2	Y	112
16	GT2	85	(Japan) JimGainer Racing	(Japan) Tetsuya Tanaka (Japan) Katsuyuki Hiranaka	Ferrari 4.0 L V8	Y	112
17	GT2	71	(Japan) Team Daishin	(Japan) Takayuki Aoki (Japan) Tomonobu Fujii	Ferrari F430 GT2	Y	111
17	GT2	71	(Japan) Team Daishin	(Japan) Takayuki Aoki (Japan) Tomonobu Fujii	Ferrari 4.0 L V8	Y	111
18	GT2	98	(Japan) Hankook KTR	(Japan) Mitsuhiro Kinoshita (Japan) Masami Kageyama	Porsche 997 GT3-RSR	H	109
18	GT2	98	(Japan) Hankook KTR	(Japan) Mitsuhiro Kinoshita (Japan) Masami Kageyama	Porsche 3.8 L Flat-6	H	109
19	GT2	40	(United States) Robertson Racing	(United States) David Robertson (United States) Andrea Robertson (United States) David Murry	Ford GT-R Mk. VII	D	108
19	GT2	40	(United States) Robertson Racing	(United States) David Robertson (United States) Andrea Robertson (United States) David Murry	Ford 5.0 L V8	D	108
20	GT2	91	(China) Team Hong Kong Racing	(Hong Kong) Philip Ma (Taiwan) Jeffrey Lee (Czech Republic) Tomáš Enge	Aston Martin V8 Vantage GT2	Y	107
20	GT2	91	(China) Team Hong Kong Racing	(Hong Kong) Philip Ma (Taiwan) Jeffrey Lee (Czech Republic) Tomáš Enge	Aston Martin 4.5 L V8	Y	107
21 DNF	GT1	50	(France) Larbre Compétition	(France) Roland Bervillé (Belgium) Stéphane Lémeret (Netherlands) Carlo van Dam	Saleen S7-R	M	81
21 DNF	GT1	50	(France) Larbre Compétition	(France) Roland Bervillé (Belgium) Stéphane Lémeret (Netherlands) Carlo van Dam	Ford 7.0 L V8	M	81
22 DNF	GT1	68	(Japan) JLOC	(Japan) Koji Yamanishi (Japan) Yuya Sakamoto	Lamborghini Murciélago R-GT	Y	37
22 DNF	GT1	68	(Japan) JLOC	(Japan) Koji Yamanishi (Japan) Yuya Sakamoto	Lamborghini 6.0 L V12	Y	37
23 DNF	GT2	81	(Japan) Scuderia Forme	(Japan) Tadakazu Kojima (Japan) K. R. Hori (Japan) Masao Kimura	Porsche 996 GT3-RSR	Y	3
23 DNF	GT2	81	(Japan) Scuderia Forme	(Japan) Tadakazu Kojima (Japan) K. R. Hori (Japan) Masao Kimura	Porsche 3.6 L Flat-6	Y	3

== Race Two ==
The second race started with the same grid as the first race, which allowed Jonny Cocker to once again lead the opening laps in Drayson Lola. Stefan Mücke in the Aston Martin was able to catch Cocker and take the lead several laps in, which it maintained for the rest of the event and took the second of the weekend's checkered flags. Race one winners Sora Racing finished in second but over a minute behind the Aston Martin. Oreca once again finished on the podium with third. In LMP2, early damage to the Ibañez Courage allowed OAK Racing to win the second race unchallenged.

In the GT1 category the class was again dominated by the Hitotsuyama Aston Martin and the No. 68 JLOC Lamborghini, although it was Hitotsuyama who were the victors in this round, winning by over a lap. The Larbre Compétition Saleen was third in class, just losing out to the Lamborghini by less than two tenths of a second. In the GT2 category the race one-winning No. 77 Felbermayr-Proton Porsche suffered an engine failure early in the event, allowing the second team car and the Robertson Ford to fight for the class lead. Engine problems set the Ford back but Felbermayr-Proton were still not able to secure victory as the Hankook Farnbacher Ferrari was able to make it into the top position at the end of the three hours. The Japanese Team Daishin Ferrari completed the podium in third.

=== Race result ===
Class winners in bold. Cars failing to complete 70% of winner's distance are marked as Not Classified (NC).

Pos	Class	No	Team	Drivers	Chassis	Tyre	Laps
Pos	Class	No	Team	Drivers	Engine	Tyre	Laps
1	**LMP1**	**007**	**(United Kingdom) Aston Martin Racing**	**(Switzerland) Harold Primat (Germany) Stefan Mücke**	**Lola-Aston Martin B09/60**	M	**128**
1	**LMP1**	**007**	**(United Kingdom) Aston Martin Racing**	**(Switzerland) Harold Primat (Germany) Stefan Mücke**	**Aston Martin 6.0 L V12**	M	**128**
2	LMP1	17	(France) Sora Racing	(France) Christophe Tinseau (Japan) Shinji Nakano	Pescarolo 01	M	128
2	LMP1	17	(France) Sora Racing	(France) Christophe Tinseau (Japan) Shinji Nakano	Judd GV5.5 S2 5.5 L V10	M	128
3	LMP1	10	(France) Team Oreca Matmut AIM	(France) Nicolas Lapierre (France) Loïc Duval	Oreca 01	M	128
3	LMP1	10	(France) Team Oreca Matmut AIM	(France) Nicolas Lapierre (France) Loïc Duval	AIM YS5.5 5.5 L V10	M	128
4	LMP1	87	(United Kingdom) Drayson Racing	(United Kingdom) Paul Drayson (United Kingdom) Jonny Cocker	Lola B09/60	M	127
4	LMP1	87	(United Kingdom) Drayson Racing	(United Kingdom) Paul Drayson (United Kingdom) Jonny Cocker	Judd GV5.5 S2 5.5 L V10	M	127
5	LMP1	15	(Germany) Kolles	(Denmark) Christian Bakkerud (United Kingdom) Oliver Jarvis	Audi R10 TDI	M	127
5	LMP1	15	(Germany) Kolles	(Denmark) Christian Bakkerud (United Kingdom) Oliver Jarvis	Audi TDI 5.5 L Turbo V12 (Diesel)	M	127
6	LMP1	14	(Germany) Kolles	(Netherlands) Christijan Albers (Italy) Matteo Cressoni (Japan) Hideki Noda	Audi R10 TDI	M	125
6	LMP1	14	(Germany) Kolles	(Netherlands) Christijan Albers (Italy) Matteo Cressoni (Japan) Hideki Noda	Audi TDI 5.5 L Turbo V12 (Diesel)	M	125
7	**LMP2**	**24**	**OAK Racing; Team Mazda France**	**(France) Jacques Nicolet (France) Matthieu Lahaye (Monaco) Richard Hein**	**Pescarolo 01**	D	**118**
7	**LMP2**	**24**	**OAK Racing; Team Mazda France**	**(France) Jacques Nicolet (France) Matthieu Lahaye (Monaco) Richard Hein**	**Mazda MZR-R 2.0 L Turbo I4**	D	**118**
8	**GT1**	**61**	**(Japan) Hitotsuyama Team Nova**	**(Japan) Akihiro Tsuzuki (Japan) Takeshi Tsuchiya**	**Aston Martin DBR9**	Y	**115**
8	**GT1**	**61**	**(Japan) Hitotsuyama Team Nova**	**(Japan) Akihiro Tsuzuki (Japan) Takeshi Tsuchiya**	**Aston Martin 6.0 L V12**	Y	**115**
9	GT1	69	(Japan) JLOC	(Japan) Atsushi Yogo (Japan) Hiroyuki Iiri	Lamborghini Murciélago R-GT	Y	114
9	GT1	69	(Japan) JLOC	(Japan) Atsushi Yogo (Japan) Hiroyuki Iiri	Lamborghini 6.0 L V12	Y	114
10	GT1	50	(France) Larbre Compétition	(France) Roland Bervillé (Belgium) Stéphane Lémeret (Netherlands) Carlo van Dam	Saleen S7-R	M	114
10	GT1	50	(France) Larbre Compétition	(France) Roland Bervillé (Belgium) Stéphane Lémeret (Netherlands) Carlo van Dam	Ford 7.0 L V8	M	114
11	**GT2**	**89**	**(Germany) Hankook Team Farnbacher**	**(Germany) Dominik Farnbacher (Denmark) Allan Simonsen**	**Ferrari F430 GT2**	H	**114**
11	**GT2**	**89**	**(Germany) Hankook Team Farnbacher**	**(Germany) Dominik Farnbacher (Denmark) Allan Simonsen**	**Ferrari 4.0 L V8**	H	**114**
12	GT2	88	(Germany) Team Felbermayr-Proton	(Germany) Christian Ried (Germany) Marco Holzer	Porsche 997 GT3-RSR	M	113
12	GT2	88	(Germany) Team Felbermayr-Proton	(Germany) Christian Ried (Germany) Marco Holzer	Porsche 4.0 L Flat-6	M	113
13	GT1	68	(Japan) JLOC	(Japan) Koji Yamanishi (Japan) Yuya Sakamoto	Lamborghini Murciélago R-GT	Y	113
13	GT1	68	(Japan) JLOC	(Japan) Koji Yamanishi (Japan) Yuya Sakamoto	Lamborghini 6.0 L V12	Y	113
14	GT2	71	(Japan) Team Daishin	(Japan) Takayuki Aoki (Japan) Tomonobu Fujii	Ferrari F430 GT2	Y	113
14	GT2	71	(Japan) Team Daishin	(Japan) Takayuki Aoki (Japan) Tomonobu Fujii	Ferrari 4.0 L V8	Y	113
15	GT2	98	(Japan) Hankook KTR	(Japan) Mitsuhiro Kinoshita (Japan) Masami Kageyama	Porsche 997 GT3-RSR	H	112
15	GT2	98	(Japan) Hankook KTR	(Japan) Mitsuhiro Kinoshita (Japan) Masami Kageyama	Porsche 3.8 L Flat-6	H	112
16	GT2	92	(United States) BMW Rahal Letterman Racing	(United States) Tommy Milner (Germany) Dirk Müller	BMW M3 GT2	D	110
16	GT2	92	(United States) BMW Rahal Letterman Racing	(United States) Tommy Milner (Germany) Dirk Müller	BMW 4.0 L V8	D	110
17	GT2	40	(United States) Robertson Racing	(United States) David Robertson (United States) Andrea Robertson (United States) David Murry	Ford GT-R Mk. VII	D	105
17	GT2	40	(United States) Robertson Racing	(United States) David Robertson (United States) Andrea Robertson (United States) David Murry	Ford 5.0 L V8	D	105
18	GT2	91	(China) Team Hong Kong Racing	(Hong Kong) Philip Ma (Taiwan) Jeffrey Lee (Czech Republic) Tomáš Enge	Aston Martin V8 Vantage GT2	Y	93
18	GT2	91	(China) Team Hong Kong Racing	(Hong Kong) Philip Ma (Taiwan) Jeffrey Lee (Czech Republic) Tomáš Enge	Aston Martin 4.5 L V8	Y	93
19	LMP2	28	(France) Ibañez Racing Service	(France) José Ibañez (France) Damien Toullemonde (France) Frédéric Da Rocha	Courage LC75	D	92
19	LMP2	28	(France) Ibañez Racing Service	(France) José Ibañez (France) Damien Toullemonde (France) Frédéric Da Rocha	AER P07 2.0 L Turbo I4	D	92
20 NC	GT2	81	(Japan) Scuderia Forme	(Japan) Tadakazu Kojima (Japan) K. R. Hori (Japan) Masao Kimura	Porsche 996 GT3-RSR	Y	69
20 NC	GT2	81	(Japan) Scuderia Forme	(Japan) Tadakazu Kojima (Japan) K. R. Hori (Japan) Masao Kimura	Porsche 3.6 L Flat-6	Y	69
21 DNF	GT2	85	(Japan) JimGainer Racing	(Japan) Tetsuya Tanaka (Japan) Katsuyuki Hiranaka	Ferrari F430 GT2	Y	62
21 DNF	GT2	85	(Japan) JimGainer Racing	(Japan) Tetsuya Tanaka (Japan) Katsuyuki Hiranaka	Ferrari 4.0 L V8	Y	62
22 DNF	GT2	77	(Germany) Team Felbermayr-Proton	(Germany) Marc Lieb (Germany) Wolf Henzler	Porsche 997 GT3-RSR	M	13
22 DNF	GT2	77	(Germany) Team Felbermayr-Proton	(Germany) Marc Lieb (Germany) Wolf Henzler	Porsche 4.0 L Flat-6	M	13
DNS	LMP1	11	(Japan) Tōkai University (Japan) YGK Power	(Japan) Shogo Mitsuyama (Japan) Shigekazu Wakisaka	Courage-Oreca LC70	Y	–
DNS	LMP1	11	(Japan) Tōkai University (Japan) YGK Power	(Japan) Shogo Mitsuyama (Japan) Shigekazu Wakisaka	YGK YR40T 4.0 L Turbo V8	Y	–
