= Hiroyuki Iiri =

Japanese racing driver (born 1969)

Hiroyuki Iiri (井入 宏之, Iiri Hiroyuki; born July 29, 1969) is a Japanese professional racing driver. Iiri won the 2006 Super GT series alongside Tetsuya Yamano, and competed in the 2010 24 Hours of Le Mans.

== Complete JGTC/Super GT results ==
(key) (Races in bold indicate pole position) (Races in italics indicate fastest lap)

Year	Team	Car	Class	1	2	3	4	5	6	7	8	9	DC	Pts
2004	RE Amemiya	Mazda RX-7	GT300	TAI; 11	SUG; 4	SEP; 1	TOK; 10	TRM; Ret	AUT; 1	SUZ; 18			4th	55
2005	RE Amemiya	Mazda RX-7	GT300	OKA; 2	FSW; Ret	SEP; 8	SUG; 4	TRM; 7	FSW; 17	AUT; 4	SUZ; 12		9th	41
2006	RE Amemiya	Mazda RX-7	GT300	SUZ; 2	OKA	FSW; 11	SEP; 1	SUG; 9	SUZ; 4	TRM; 4	AUT; 2	FSW; 6	**1st**	**86**
2007	RE Amemiya	Mazda RX-7	GT300	SUZ; 9	OKA; 12	FSW; 8	SEP; 8	SUG; 8	SUZ; 11	TRM; 8	AUT; Ret	FSW; 12	20th	14
2008	RE Amemiya	Mazda RX-7	GT300	SUZ; 1	OKA; 14	FSW; 19	SEP; 3	SUG; 4	SUZ; 3	TRM; 13	AUT; 20	FSW; Ret	7th	54
2009	JLOC	Lamborghini Gallardo RG-3	GT300	OKA; 11	SUZ; Ret	FSW; Ret	SEP; 15	SUG; 19	SUZ; 12	FSW; 11	AUT; 17	TRM; Ret	NC	0
2010	JLOC	Lamborghini Gallardo RG-3	GT300	SUZ; 10	OKA; 17	FSW; 15	SEP; 11	SUG; 17	SUZ; 12	FSW; C	TRM; 20		21st	1
2011	JLOC	Lamborghini Gallardo RG-3	GT300	OKA; Ret	FSW; 8	SEP; 4	SUG; 10	SUZ; 15	FSW; 4	AUT; 12	TRM; 5		13th	26

== 24 Hours of Le Mans results ==
Year	Team	Co-Drivers	Car	Class	Laps	Pos.	Class Pos.
2010	(Japan) JLOC	(Japan) Atsushi Yogo (Japan) Koji Yamanishi	Lamborghini Murciélago LP670 R-SV	LMGT1	138	DNF	DNF
