= Ryo Orime =

Japanese racing driver

Ryo Orime (折目 遼, Orime Ryo; born June 26, 1982) is a Japanese professional race car driver.

== Complete Super GT Results ==
Year	Team	Car	Class	1	2	3	4	5	6	7	8	9	DC	Pts
2007	RE Amemiya Racing	Mazda RX-7	GT300	SUZ; 9	OKA; 12	FSW; 8	SEP; 8	SUG; 8	SUZ; 11	TRM; 8	AUT; Ret	FSW; 12	20th	14
2008	RE Amemiya Racing	Mazda RX-7	GT300	SUZ; 1	OKA; 14	FSW; 19	SEP; 3	SUG; 4	SUZ; 3	TRM; 13	AUT; 20	FSW; Ret	7th	54
2009	M7 RE Amemiya Racing	Mazda RX-7	GT300	OKA; 3	SUZ; 2	FSW; 3	SEP; 3	SUG; 11	SUZ; 7	FSW; DNS	AUT; 2	TRM; 2	2nd	82
2010	M7 RE Amemiya Racing	Mazda RX-7	GT300	SUZ; 1	OKA; 18	FSW; 11	SEP; 1	SUG; 7	SUZ; 6	FSW; C	TRM; 8		3rd	52
2011	Team SGC	Lexus IS350	GT300	OKA; 15	FSW; 16	SEP; Ret	SUG; 1	SUZ; 8	FSW; 2	AUT; 3	TRM; Ret		5th	49
2012	Team SGC	Lexus IS350	GT300	OKA	FSW	SEP	SUG; 13	SUZ; 13	FSW; 12	AUT; 13	TRM; Ret		NC	0
2013	Bonds Racing	Nissan GT-R NISMO GT3	GT300	OKA; 13	FSW	SEP	SUG	SUZ	FSW	FSW	AUT	TRM	NC	0
