= Hiroki Kato =

Japanese footballer

Hiroki Kato 加藤 広樹
Personal information
- Full name: Hiroki Kato
- Date of birth: July 31, 1986 (age 40)
- Place of birth: Hiratsuka, Japan
- Height: 1.91 m (6 ft 3 in)
- Position: Defender

Youth career
- 2002–2004: Yokohama F. Marinos
- 2005–2008: Ryutsu Keizai University

Senior career*
Years	Team	Apps	(Gls)
2004	Yokohama F. Marinos	0	(0)
2007	Mito HollyHock	4	(0)
2009–2013	Mito HollyHock	40	(3)
Total		44	(3)
Medal record
Yokohama F. Marinos
Winner	J1 League	2004
- * Club domestic league appearances and goals

Hiroki Kato (加藤 広樹, Katō Hiroki; born July 31, 1986) is a former Japanese football player.

== Club statistics ==
Club performance			League		Cup		League Cup		Continental		Total	
Season	Club	League	Apps	Goals	Apps	Goals	Apps	Goals	Apps	Goals	Apps	Goals
Japan			League		Emperor's Cup		J.League Cup		Asia		Total	
2004	Yokohama F. Marinos	J1 League	0	0	0	0	0	0	1	0	1	0
2005	Ryutsu Keizai University	Football League	10	1	-		-		-		10	1
2006	Ryutsu Keizai University	Football League	4	0	0	0	-		-		4	0
2007	Ryutsu Keizai University	Football League	16	1	0	0	-		-		16	1
2007	Mito HollyHock	J2 League	4	0	0	0	-		-		4	0
2008	Ryutsu Keizai University	Football League	11	0	0	0	-		-		11	0
2009	Mito HollyHock	J2 League	4	0	0	0	-		-		4	0
2010	Mito HollyHock	J2 League	2	0	0	0	-		-		2	0
2011	Mito HollyHock	J2 League										
Total			51	2	0	0	0	0	1	0	52	2
