= Yūya Sakamoto =

Japanese baseball player (born 1997)

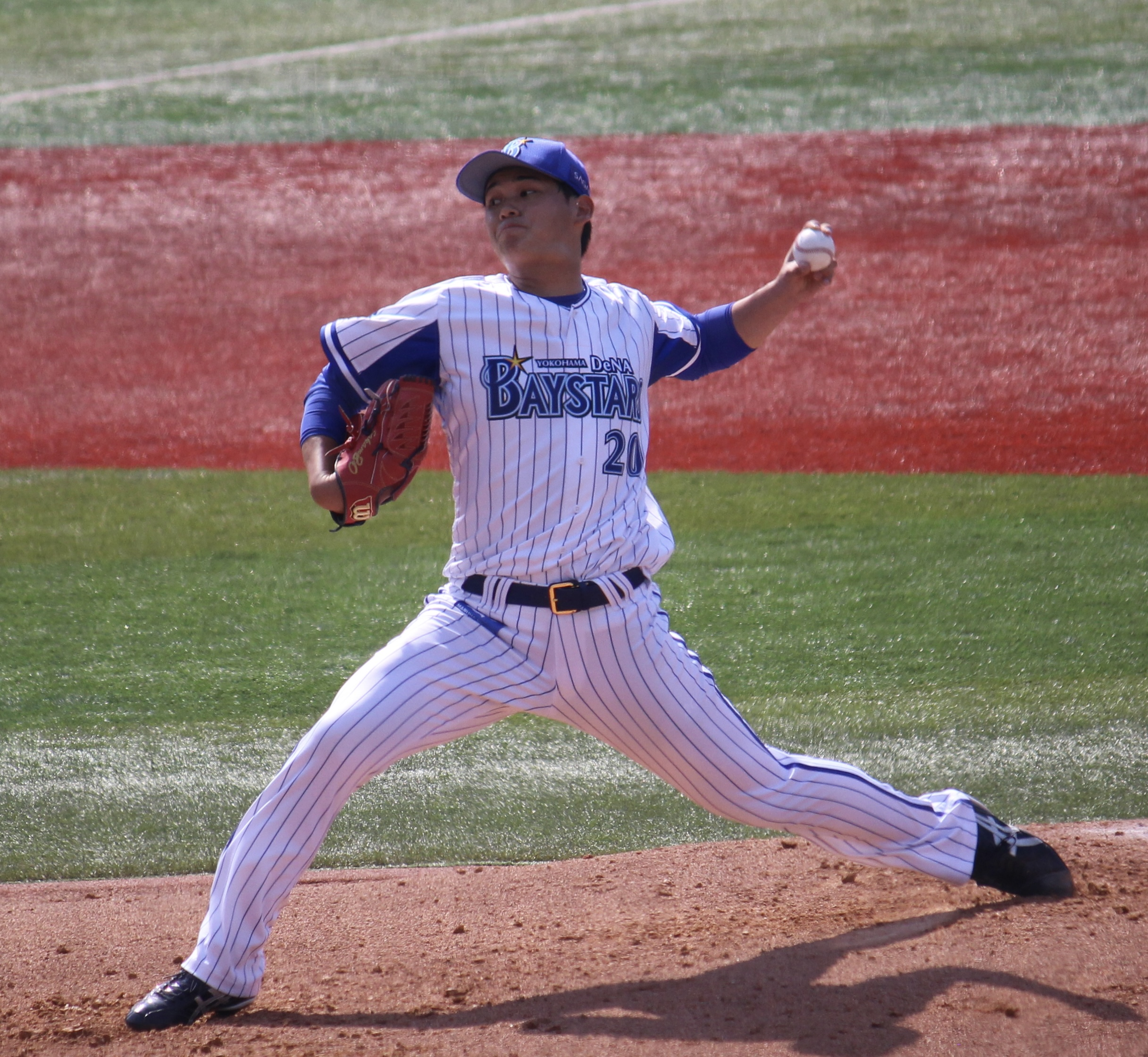
- Sakamoto with the Yokohama DeNA BayStars

Yokohama DeNA BayStars – No. 20
- Pitcher
- Born: July 28, 1997 (age 28); Fukuoka, Fukuoka, Japan
- Bats: Left Throws: Left

NPB debut
- June 25, 2020, for the Yokohama DeNA BayStars

Career statistics (through 2024 season)
- Win–loss record: 9–14
- Earned run average: 4.99
- Strikeouts: 155
- Saves: 0
- Holds: 13
- Stats at Baseball Reference

Teams
- Yokohama DeNA BayStars (2020–present)

Career highlights and awards
- Japan Series champion (2024)

Yūya Sakamoto (坂本 裕哉, Sakamoto Yūya; born June 28, 1997) is a professional Japanese baseball player. He is a pitcher for the Yokohama DeNA BayStars of Nippon Professional Baseball (NPB).
