= Koji Yamanishi =

Japanese racing driver

- Full name: Koji Yamanishi
- Born: 山西 康司; 11 October 1977 (age 48)

Koji Yamanishi (山西 康司, Yamanishi Koji; born October 11, 1977) is a professional race car driver.

== Racing Record ==
=== Complete Formula Nippon results ===
(key) (Races in bold indicate pole position) (Races in italics indicate fastest lap)

| Year | Team | 1 | 2 | 3 | 4 | 5 | 6 | 7 | 8 | 9 | 10 | DC | Pts |
|---|---|---|---|---|---|---|---|---|---|---|---|---|---|
| 1997 | PIAA NAKAJIMA RACING | SUZ; 5 | MIN; Ret | FSW; 8 | SUZ; Ret | SUG; Ret | FSW; Ret | MIN; Ret | TRM; 17 | FSW; Ret | SUZ; 7 | 15th | 2 |
| 1998 | PIAA NAKAJIMA RACING | SUZ; Ret | MIN; 7 | FSW; Ret | TRM; Ret | SUZ | SUG; 6 | FSW; C | MIN; Ret | FSW; Ret | SUZ; 11 | 15th | 1 |
| 1999 | UNLIMITED RACING Team Le Mans | SUZ; Ret | TRM; Ret | MIN; 4 | FSW; 4 | SUZ; 8 | SUG; 9 | FSW; 8 | MIN; Ret | TRM; 16 | SUZ; Ret | 12th | 6 |
| 2000 | Team Morinaga NOVA | SUZ; Ret | TRM; 9 | MIN; 7 | FSW; 11 | SUZ; 14 | SUG; Ret | TRM; Ret | FSW; Ret | MIN; 7 | SUZ; 7 | NC | 0 |
| 2001 | Team LeMans | SUZ | TRM | MIN | FSW | SUZ | SUG | FSW; 10 | MIN; 5 | TRM; 10 | SUZ; Ret | 14th | 2 |
| 2004 | CARROZZERIA Team MOHN | SUZ | SUG | TRM | SUZ; 12 | SUG; 10 | MIN | SEP | TRM; 8 | SUZ | | NC | 0 |
