= Kazuki Hiramine =

Japanese racing driver

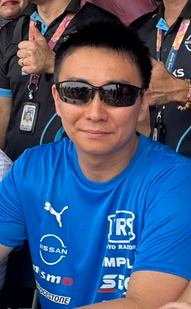
- Hiramine at the 2025 Super GT Malaysia Festival
- Nationality: (Japan) Japanese
- Born: 7 January 1992 (age 34) Minoh, Osaka, Japan

Super GT - GT500 career
- Debut season: 2020
- Current team: Team Impul
- Categorisation: FIA Gold
- Car number: 12
- Starts: 48
- Wins: 2
- Podiums: 11
- Poles: 0
- Fastest laps: 1
- Best finish: 1st in 2022

Previous series
- 2014-19 2012, 2018 2010-11 2008: Super GT - GT300; All-Japan Formula Three; Formula Challenge Japan; Formula Renault BARC FR2000

Championship titles
- 2022 2016: Super GT - GT500; Super Taikyū - ST-X

Kazuki Hiramine (平峰一貴, Hiramine Kazuki; born 7 January 1992) is a Japanese racing driver, currently racing in the Super GT Series as a Nissan factory driver with Team Impul. He won the Super GT GT500 Championship in 2022, alongside co-driver Bertrand Baguette.

== Racing career ==
=== Early career ===
Hiramine made the step up from karting to single-seaters in Europe, rather than his native Japan. He debuted in the 2008 Formula Renault BARC FR2000 Series finale at Silverstone with Eurotek Motorsport, then returned to the same team for the Formula Renault 2.0 UK Winter Cup. He finished 13th in the Winter Cup standings with a best finish of eighth at Rockingham Motor Speedway.

Hiramine returned to Japan in 2009, graduated from the Suzuka Racing School Formula (SRS-F), and received a scholarship to compete in Formula Challenge Japan the following season with the backing of Honda. In his first Formula Challenge Japan season, Hiramine finished third in the championship, with seven podiums in 12 races. The following year, Hiramine won his first race at Fuji Speedway, then won from the pole at Suzuka Circuit and again at Fuji. Despite winning three of the first five races, Hiramine finished fourth in the championship after scoring only seven points in the remaining eight races.

In 2012, Hiramine became a member of the Honda Formula Dream Project (HFDP) driver training program, and made the step up to the All-Japan Formula Three Championship, competing in the National class with HFDP Racing. He won four consecutive races at Twin Ring Motegi and Fuji, and eventually finished second in the championship to Nissan prospect Daiki Sasaki.

After the season, a dissatisfied Hiramine told Honda that he planned to stop racing. He spent most of 2013 working part-time jobs posting flyers in letterboxes, and as a cook. His only professional race was a one-off cameo in the Super Taikyu Series finale at Autopolis, where he won the ST-4 class in a Honda S2000 entered by Tracy Sports.

Hiramine later returned to All-Japan F3 in a one-off appearance for B-Max Racing at Sugo in May 2018.

=== Super GT - GT300 ===
==== JLOC (2014-2018) ====
After spending most of 2014 out of racing, Hiramine made his Super GT debut in the 2014 Suzuka 1000km, as a third driver for JLOC in their number 88 Lamborghini Gallardo GT3. He finished 13th in his series debut.

Hiramine became a full-time GT300 driver beginning in 2015, partnering two-time series champion Manabu Orido in JLOC's flagship number 88 team. In six races, Hiramine recorded two fourth-place finishes at the Suzuka 1000km and at Sportsland Sugo. JLOC switched to the new Lamborghini Huracán GT3 in 2016. Hiramine recorded his first GT300 podium at Motegi, when he and Orido finished third in the first race of a double-header weekend. He and co-driver Orido finished 11th in the championship. Hiramine returned to partner Orido for the 2017 season. He recorded a career-best finish of second in the final Suzuka 1000km. Hiramine and Orido finished tenth in the championship.

The following year, Lamborghini works driver Marco Mapelli replaced Orido in the number 88 Lamborghini. Mapelli won the pole for the opening round at Okayama, and Hiramine won his first pole at the season finale at Motegi. Hiramine recorded six straight top-ten finishes to open the season, and finished tenth in the drivers' championship.

While at JLOC, Hiramine also entered the Lamborghini Super Trofeo Asia series on a part-time basis, and won the Pro-Am class in race one of the 2015 round at Sepang Circuit. In 2016, he made his Intercontinental GT Challenge debut with JLOC, competing in the Sepang 12 Hours. He finished eighth overall. In 2018, he entered the inaugural Suzuka 10 Hours with JLOC, partnering Mapelli and fellow Lamborghini factory driver Andrea Caldarelli in a Pro class car sponsored by EVA Racing (Run'A Entertainment).

==== Kondo Racing (2019) ====
While competing for JLOC in Super GT, Hiramine returned to Super Taikyu, competing full-time in the premier ST-X (GT3) class with Kondo Racing and Nissan Automobile Technical College in their Nissan GT-R NISMO GT3. He helped Kondo Racing win the 2016 championship with four wins in six races, and finished runner-up in 2017 and 2018.

In 2019, Kondo Racing's ST-X team moved up to the GT300 class of Super GT, and Hiramine left JLOC to continue with Kondo Racing, with former Renault Sport Academy member Sacha Fenestraz as his team mate. Driving the newest generation of the Nissan GT-R NISMO GT3, Kondo Racing had a successful first GT300 campaign. Hiramine won the pole for the Fuji 500km race on Golden Week, and in the fourth round at Chang International Circuit, Hiramine and Fenestraz were leading the GT300 class until the final lap, when Hiramine was overtaken by the No. 10 Gainer Nissan of Keishi Ishikawa (with co-driver Kazuki Hoshino), and dropped to second. With seven top-ten finishes, Hiramine and Fenestraz finished sixth in the GT300 standings.

Hiramine was meant to take part in the 2020 Nürburgring 24 Hour Race with Kondo Racing, but their entry was cancelled due to the COVID-19 pandemic.

=== Super GT - GT500 ===
==== Team Impul (2020-present) ====
Hiramine was invited to take part in a post-season GT500 test for Nissan at Fuji, following the conclusion of the 2019 season. On 10 January, Hiramine was officially announced as a Nissan GT500 driver, joining Team Impul as a driver of the number 12 Calsonic Impul Nissan GT-R.

In his first GT500 season, Hiramine was partnered by Daiki Sasaki. While they struggled early in the season, Hiramine did capture his first GT500 podium by finishing second in the sixth round of the championship at Suzuka. In 2021, Sasaki moved to Kondo Racing, and Nobuharu Matsushita, the former GP2 Series/FIA Formula 2 driver, made his GT500 debut with Nissan and Team Impul. Hiramine and Matsushita won in GT500 for the first time at Sportsland Sugo. At the penultimate round at Motegi, Hiramine was leading on the final lap, but ran out of fuel and dropped to third place. A win would have moved Hiramine and Matsushita to within eight points of championship leader Naoki Yamamoto. Instead, they fell to sixth in the championship heading into the final round at Fuji. They would finish the year eighth in the final standings, with two podiums and seven top-ten finishes.

Before the 2022 season, Matsushita and Bertrand Baguette swapped manufacturers and teams, with Baguette joining Nissan and Impul after eight seasons as a Honda driver. 2022 also saw the debut of the new Nissan Z GT500 race car, which replaced the GT-R as the company's flagship GT500 vehicle. The new combination of Hiramine and Baguette finished third in a shortened Fuji 450km race on Golden Week. Two months later, they finished second at the Fuji 100 Lap Race. At the Suzuka 450km race, the Calsonic Z qualified 15th and last in class, but came back to win the race as Hiramine took the lead with three laps to go. The Calsonic Z finished fifth at Sugo, sixth at Autopolis, and in the final race at Motegi, Hiramine, Baguette, and Team Impul clinched the GT500 Drivers' and Teams' Championships with a second-place finish. This was the first set of Super GT titles for Team Impul since the 1995 season, and the first GT500 titles for Hiramine and Baguette.

== Racing record ==
=== Career summary ===
Season	Series	Team	Races	Wins	Poles	FLaps	Podiums	Points	Position
2008	Formula Renault BARC FR2000	Eurotek Motorsport	2	0	0	0	0	6	17th
2008	Formula Renault 2.0 UK Winter Cup	Eurotek Motorsport	4	0	0	0	0	37	13th
2010	Formula Challenge Japan	HFDP/SRS Scholarship/Kotira R	12	0	0	0	7	48	**3rd**
2011	Formula Challenge Japan	HFDP/SRS-F/Kotira R	13	3	3	4	3	45	4th
2011	Super Taikyū - ST-4	Tracy Sports	1	0	0	0	0	73.5‡	**2nd‡**
2012	Japanese Formula 3 Championship - National	HFDP Racing	15	4	2	1	13	110	**2nd**
2013	Super Taikyū - ST-4	Tracy Sports	1	1	1	0	1	21	10th‡
2014	Super GT - GT300	JLOC	1	0	0	0	0	0	NC
2015	Super GT - GT300	JLOC	6	0	0	0	0	22	15th
2016	Super GT - GT300	JLOC	8	0	0	1	1	30	11th
2016	Intercontinental GT Challenge	JLOC	1	0	0	0	0	N/A	N/A
2016	Super Taikyū - ST-X	Kondō Racing	6	4	0	1	6	137‡	**1st‡**
2017	Super GT - GT300	JLOC	7	0	2	0	0	28	10th
2017	Super Taikyū - ST-X	Kondō Racing	6	2	0	1	3	84‡	**2nd‡**
2018	Super GT - GT300	JLOC	8	0	2	0	0	33	10th
2018	Intercontinental GT Challenge	JLOC	1	0	0	0	0	N/A	N/A
2018	Super Taikyū - ST-X	Kondō Racing	5	1	0	1	4	101.5‡	**2nd‡**
2018	Japanese Formula 3 Championship	B-Max Racing	2	0	0	0	0	0	NC
2019	Super GT - GT300	Kondō Racing	8	0	1	0	1	46	6th
2019	Super Taikyū - ST-X	GTNET Motor Sports	1	1	0	0	1	130‡	**1st‡**
2020	Super GT - GT500	Team Impul	8	0	0	0	1	24	15th
2020	Super Taikyū - ST-X	GTNET Motor Sports	1	0	0	0	1	82.5‡	**3rd‡**
2021	Super GT - GT500	Team Impul	8	1	0	0	2	45	8th
2022	Super GT - GT500	Team Impul	8	1	0	0	4	70.5	**1st**
2022	Super Taikyū - ST-3	FKS Team Fukushima	4	0	1	1	3	76‡	4th‡
2023	Super GT - GT500	Team Impul	7	0	0	0	1	46	5th
2023	Super Taikyū - ST-Z	Team Impul	6	0	0	0	1	59.5‡	7th‡
2024	Super GT - GT500	Team Impul	8	0	0	1	2	47	7th
2024	Super Taikyu - ST-Z	Team Impul	7	0	0	0	3	71.5‡	7th‡
2025	Super GT - GT500	Team Impul	8	0	0	0	1	27.5	10th
2025	Super Taikyu - ST-Z	Team Impul	7	0	0	0	1	62.5‡	6th‡
2026	Super GT - GT500	Team Impul	8	1	0	0	3	57	4th
2026	Super Taikyu - ST-Z	Team Impul							

‡ Team standings

=== Complete Japanese Formula 3 results ===
(key) (Races in bold indicate pole position) (Races in italics indicate fastest lap)

Year	Team	Engine	Class	1	2	3	4	5	6	7	8	9	10	11	12	13	14	15	16	17	18	19	DC	Pts
2012	HFDP Racing	Toyota	N	SUZ; 1; 7	SUZ; 2; 7	**MOT**; **1**; 6	MOT; 2; 7	**FUJ**; **1**; 4	FUJ; 2; 6	MOT; 1; 10	MOT; 2; 8	OKA; 1; 8	OKA; 2; 7	SUG; 1; 6	SUG; 2; 8	SUG; 3; 5	FUJ; 1; 10	FUJ; 2; 7					**2nd**	**110**
2018	B-Max Racing Team	VW		SUZ; 1	SUZ; 2	SUG; 1; 10	SUG; 2; 10	FUJ; 1	FUJ; 2	OKA; 1	OKA; 2	OKA; 3	MOT; 1	MOT; 2	MOT; 3	OKA; 1	OKA; 2	SUG; 1	SUG; 2	SUG; 3	FUJ; 1	FUJ; 2	NC	0

=== Complete Super GT results ===
(key) (Races in bold indicate pole position) (Races in italics indicate fastest lap)

Year	Team	Car	Class	1	2	3	4	5	6	7	8	9	DC	Points
2014	JLOC	Lamborghini Gallardo GT3 FL2	GT300	OKA	FUJ	AUT	SUG	FUJ	SUZ; 13	CHA	MOT		NC	0
2015	JLOC	Lamborghini Gallardo GT3 FL2	GT300	OKA; Ret	FUJ; Ret	CHA	FUJ	SUZ; 4	SUG; 4	AUT; Ret	MOT; 7		16th	22
2016	JLOC	Lamborghini Huracán GT3	GT300	OKA; 9	FUJ; 25	SUG; 6	FUJ; 4	SUZ; 9	CHA; 10	MOT; 3	MOT; Ret		11th	30
2017	JLOC	Lamborghini Huracán GT3	GT300	OKA; 19	FUJ; 25	AUT; 16	SUG; Ret	FUJ; 7	SUZ; 2	CHA; 5	MOT; Ret		10th	28
2018	JLOC	Lamborghini Huracán GT3	GT300	**OKA**; 7	FUJ; 9	SUZ; 4	CHA; 6	FUJ; 6	SUG; 5	AUT; 13	**MOT**; 27		10th	33
2019	Kondo Racing	Nissan GT-R Nismo GT3 (2018)	GT300	OKA; 5‡	**FUJ**; 4	SUZ; 18	CHA; 2	FUJ; 7	AUT; 8	SUG; 5	MOT; 6		6th	46
2020	Team Impul	Nissan GT-R NISMO GT500	GT500	FUJ; Ret	FUJ; 11	SUZ; 12	MOT; 12	FUJ; 8	SUZ; 2	MOT; 9	FUJ; 7		15th	24
2021	Kondō Racing	Nissan GT-R NISMO GT500	GT500	FUJ; 14	FUJ; 12	SUZ; 12	MOT; 3	FUJ; 6	SUZ; 14	MOT; 7	FUJ; 11		15th	20
2022	Team Impul	Nissan Z NISMO GT500	GT500	OKA; 7	FUJ; 3‡	SUZ; Ret	FUJ; 2	SUZ; 1	SUG; 5	AUT; 6	MOT; 2		1st	70.5
2023	Team Impul	Nissan Z NISMO GT500	GT500	OKA; 6	FUJ; 9	SUZ; 3	FUJ; 15	SUZ; 5	SUG; 4	AUT; 5	MOT; 4		5th	46
2024	Team Impul	Nissan Z NISMO GT500	GT500	OKA; 11	FUJ; 6	SUZ; 4	FUJ; 5	SUG; 3	AUT; 5	MOT; 11	SUZ; 3		6th	47
2025	Team Impul	Nissan Z NISMO GT500	GT500	OKA; Ret	FUJ; 4	SEP; 3	FS1 (6)	FS2; 5	SUZ; 8	SUG; 14	AUT; 11	MOT; DSQ	10th	27.5
2026	Team Impul	Nissan Z NISMO GT500	GT500	OKA; 3	FUJ; 7	FUJ; 12	SUZ; 6	SUG; Ret	AUT; 5	MOT; 1	MOT; 3		4th	57

^{‡} Half points awarded as less than 75% of race distance was completed.
^{(Number)} Driver did not take part in this sprint race, points are still awarded for the teammate's result.
^{*} Season still in progress.

Sporting positions
Preceded by Sho Tsuboi; Yuhi Sekiguchi	Super GT; GT500 Champion; 2022; With: Bertrand Baguette	Succeeded by Sho Tsuboi; Ritomo Miyata
