= Ryo Ogawa =

Japanese racing driver (born 1991)

- Nationality: (Japan) Japanese
- Born: 21 April 1991 (age 35) Kanagawa, Japan
- Relatives: Hitoshi Ogawa (father)
- Categorisation: FIA Silver

Championship titles
- 2016 2015 2013–2014, 2022–2023: Super Taikyu – ST-4; Japanese Formula 3 Championship – National Class; Porsche Carrera Cup Japan

Ryo Ogawa (小河 諒, Ogawa Ryō; born 21 April 1991 in Kanagawa) is a Japanese racing driver. He is a four time champion of Porsche Carrera Cup Japan.

== Personal life ==
Ogawa is the son of 1989 Japanese Formula 3000 champion Hitoshi Ogawa.

== Career ==
Ogawa made his single-seater debut in 2010, competing for R.Houka Racing in Formula Challenge Japan. Competing in the series until 2012, Ogawa scored a best result of fourth at Fuji in his final season in the series en route to an eighth-place points finish. The following year, Ogawa joined Bright Motorsport to race in Porsche Carrera Cup Japan, scoring four wins and five more podiums to clinch his maiden series title. During 2013, Ogawa also raced in select rounds of the Japanese Formula 3 Championship's National Class for Le Beausset Motorsports, scoring a class podium at Okayama.

Remaining in Carrera Cup Japan for 2014, Ogawa joined Team KTouch for his sophomore season, winning both races at Fuji en route to his second consecutive title in the series. Ogawa then joined TOM'S to race in Japanese Formula 3, winning the National Class title by winning all but three races and finishing no lower than second in the other three. In 2016, Ogawa transitioned to the ST-4 class of the Super Taikyu Series, winning the title in his maiden season with Endless Sports. During 2016, Ogawa also passed his first Super GT rookie test at Sportsland SUGO for Lamborghini Team Direction.

Two more seasons with Endless Sports in ST-4 then ensued, finishing runner-up in 2017 and third in 2018 with a lone win at Okayama. In 2018, Ogawa also partook in his second Super GT rookie test as a refresher, this time for EIcars Bentley at Okayama. The following year, Ogawa returned to Porsche Carrera Cup Japan with Bingo Racing, scoring a lone win at Fuji en route to a third-place points finish. Remaining with the team for the 2020 season, Ogawa won at Fuji and Motegi to end the year fourth in points.

Continuing with Bingo Racing for 2021, Ogawa won both races at Fuji and Suzuka to end the year runner-up to Tsubasa Kondo by 8 points. The following year, Ogawa remained with the team and won six races en route to his third series title by 50 points over Tsubasa Kondo. Remaining with Bingo Racing to defend his third title, Ogawa won all but one race he started to clinch his fourth title by 61 points over Takumi Sato. Alongside his campaign in Carrera Cup Japan, Ogawa made his debut in Super GT, racing for apr in both Fuji rounds in the GT300 class.

The following year, Ogawa raced in the first two rounds of GT World Challenge Asia, scoring a Silver class podium at Sepang. During 2024, Ogawa also raced for OTG Motor Sports in the Toyota Gazoo Racing GR86/BRZ Cup, as well as racing in the ST-4 class of Super Taikyu for Endless Sports, in which he scored two wins to help the team secure the class title. In 2025, Ogawa returned to GT300 and apr alongside Manabu Orido and Hiroaki Nagai for the endurance rounds, scoring a best result of 16th at Fuji. During 2025, Ogawa also raced for Endless Sports in the ST-4 class of Super Taikyu, scoring wins at Autopolis and Fuji to help the team end the year runner-up in points.

In 2026, Ogawa continued with apr to race in the ST-X class of Super Taikyu. During 2026, Ogawa made select appearances in GT World Challenge Asia and the Suzuka 1000 km for LM corsa, most notably taking a Silver class win at Fuji in the former.

== Racing record ==
=== Racing career summary ===
Season	Series	Team	Races	Wins	Poles	F/Laps	Podiums	Points	Position
2010	Formula Challenge Japan	R.Houka Racing	12	0	0	0	0	0	NC
2011	Formula Challenge Japan	Houka Racing with Dunlop	13	0	0	0	0	0	NC
2012	Formula Challenge Japan	Houka Racing with Dunlop	12	0	0	0	0	7	8th
2013	Porsche Carrera Cup Japan	Bright Motorsport	10	4	3	3	9	171	**1st**
2013	Japanese Formula 3 Championship – National	Tochigi Le Beausset Motorsports	4	0	0	0	1	10	7th
2013	86BRZ Challenge Cup – JP-2R	SPV Racing	1	1	1	1	1	22	**1st**
2013	Porsche Carrera Cup Asia – Macau Grand Prix Invitational	Bright Motorsport	1	0	0	0	0	N/A	7th
2014	Porsche Carrera Cup Japan	Team KTouch Porsche	10	2			8	154	**1st**
2015	Japanese Formula 3 Championship – National	TOM'S	17	14	15	17	17	192	**1st**
2016	Super Taikyu – ST-4	Endless Sports							**1st**
2016	Audi R8 LMS Cup	KCMG	4	0	0	0	0	25	12th
2017	TGR GR86/BRZ Cup								
2017	Audi R8 LMS Cup								
2017	Super Taikyu – ST-4	Endless Sports	6	0	0	0	6	94.5‡	**2nd‡**
2018	TGR GR86/BRZ Cup								
2018	Super Taikyu – ST-4	Endless Sports	6	1	0	0	4	91‡	**3rd‡**
2019	Suzuka 10 Hours	Callaway Competition with Bingo Racing	1	0	0	0	0	N/A	19th
2019	Porsche Carrera Cup Japan	Bingo Racing	10	1			7	143	**3rd**
2019	TGR GR86/BRZ Cup								
2019	Super Taikyu – ST-3	Le Beausset Motorsports	6	2	1	1	3	92‡	4th‡
2020	Porsche Carrera Cup Japan	Bingo Racing	8	2			5	121	4th
2020	Super Taikyu – ST-4	Endless Sports	4	0	0	1	3	74‡	4th‡
2021	Porsche Carrera Cup Japan	Bingo Racing	11	4			11	200	**2nd**
2021	Super Taikyu – ST-Z	Endless Sports	4	1	0	0	4	106‡	**1st‡**
2021	Super Taikyu – ST-2	Endless Sports	1	0	0	0	1	15‡	9th‡
2022	Porsche Carrera Cup Japan	Bingo Racing	11	6			11	247	**1st**
2022	Super Taikyu – ST-Q	Endless Sports	9	6	??	??	??	??‡	??‡
2022	TGR GR86/BRZ Cup	OTG Motor Sports	3	0	0	0	0	5	21st
2023	Porsche Carrera Cup Japan	Bingo Racing	11	10			11	270	**1st**
2023	Super GT – GT300	apr	2	0	0	0	0	0	NC
2023	Super Taikyu – ST-4	Endless Sports	5	1	2	0	2	59‡	6th‡
2023	TGR GR86/BRZ Cup	OTG Motor Sports	7	0	0	0	1	12	18th
2024	GT World Challenge Asia	LM corsa	4	0	0	0	0	6	38th
2024	GT World Challenge Asia – Silver	LM corsa	4	0	0	0	1	49	7th
2024	TGR GR86/BRZ Cup	OTG Motor Sports	7	0	1	0	0	37	8th
2024	Super Taikyu – ST-4	Endless Sports	5	2	0	2	6	134‡	**1st‡**
2025	Super GT – GT300	apr	2	0	0	0	0	0	NC
2025	Super Taikyu – ST-4	Endless Sports	6	2	0	0	5	125‡	**2nd‡**
2025	TGR GR86/BRZ Cup	OTG Motor Sports	7	0	0	0	0	15	14th
2026	Super Taikyu – ST-X	apr						‡	‡
2026	GT World Challenge Asia	LM corsa	4	0	0	0	1	26	21st
2026	GT World Challenge Asia – Pro-Am	LM corsa	4	1	0	0	1	45	15th
2026	Intercontinental GT Challenge	LM corsa	1	0	0	0	0	0	NC
2026	TGR GR86/BRZ Cup	OTG Motor Sports						*	*

‡ Team standings

=== Complete Formula Challenge Japan results ===
(key) (Races in bold indicate pole position) (Races in italics indicate fastest lap)

Year	Team	1	2	3	4	5	6	7	8	9	10	11	12	13	14	DC	Pts
2010	R.Houka Racing	MOT1; 1; 18	MOT1; 2; 19	FUJ1; 1; 12	FUJ1; 2; 18	FUJ2; 1; 17	FUJ2; 2; 20	MOT2; 1; 18	MOT2; 2; 14	SUZ1; Ret	SUZ2; 1; 19	SUZ2; 2; 18	SUZ2; 3; 17			NC	0
2011	Houka Racing with Dunlop	FUJ1; 1; 15	FUJ1; 2; 11	SUZ1; 1; 12	SUZ1; 2; 13	FUJ2; 1; 17	FUJ2; 2; 11	FUJ2; 3; 15	SUZ2; C	SUZ3; 1 DNS	SUZ3; 2; 17	MOT; 1; 14	MOT; 2; 12	MOT; 3; 16	MOT; 4; 13	NC	0
2012	Houka Racing with Dunlop	FUJ1; 1; 6	FUJ1; 2; 4	MOT; 1; 6	MOT; 2; 7	FUJ2; 1; 12	FUJ2; 2; 11	FUJ2; 3; 14	SUZ1; 1; 10	SUZ1; 2; 6	SUZ2; 1; 12	SUZ2; 2; 6	SUZ2; 3; 7			8th	7

=== Complete Japanese Formula 3 results ===
(key) (Races in bold indicate pole position) (Races in italics indicate fastest lap)

Year	Team	Engine	Class	1	2	3	4	5	6	7	8	9	10	11	12	13	14	15	16	17	DC	Pts
2013	Tochigi Le Beausset Motorsports	Toyota	N	SUZ; 1	SUZ; 2	MOT; 1	MOT; 2	MOT; 3	OKA; 1; 6	OKA; 2 DNS	FUJ; 1; 10	FUJ; 2 DSQ	MOT; 1 Ret	MOT; 2 DNS	SUG; 1	SUG; 2	FUJ; 1	FUJ; 2			7th	10
2015	TOM'S	Toyota	N	**SUZ**; **1**; 9	SUZ; 2; 10	**MOT**; **1**; 11	**MOT**; **2**; 10	MOT; 3; 10	**OKA**; **1**; 9	**OKA**; **2**; 9	FUJ; 1; 10	**FUJ**; **2**; 10	**OKA**; **1**; 11	**OKA**; **2**; 10	**FUJ**; **1**; 11	**FUJ**; **2**; 9	**MOT**; **1**; 11	**MOT**; **2**; 9	**SUG**; **1**; 11	**SUG**; **2**; 10	**1st**	**192**

=== Complete Super GT results ===
(key) (Races in bold indicate pole position) (Races in italics indicate fastest lap)

Year	Team	Car	Class	1	2	3	4	5	6	7	8	9	DC	Points
2023	apr	Toyota GR86 GT300	GT300	OKA	FUJ1; 18	SUZ1	FUJ2; 13	SUZ2	SUG	AUT	MOT		NC	0
2025	apr	Toyota GR86 GT300	GT300	OKA	FUJ; 16	SEP	FS1	FS2	SUZ	SUG	AUT; 22	MOT	NC	0

=== Complete GT World Challenge Asia results ===
(key) (Races in bold indicate pole position) (Races in italics indicate fastest lap)

Year	Team	Car	Class	1	2	3	4	5	6	7	8	9	10	11	12	DC	Points
2024	LM Corsa	Ferrari 296 GT3	Silver	SEP; 1; 3	SEP; 2; 5	BUR; 1; 4	BUR; 2; 4	FUJ; 1	FUJ; 2	SUZ; 1	SUZ; 2	OKA; 1	OKA; 2	SHA; 1	SHA; 2	7th	49
2026	LM corsa	Ferrari 296 GT3	Silver	SEP; 1	SEP; 2	MAN; 1	MAN; 2	SHA; 1	SHA; 2	FUJ; 1; 1	FUJ; 2; 5	OKA; 1 Ret	OKA; 2; 5	BEI; 1	BEI; 2	15th	45
