= 2012 Japanese Formula 3 Championship =

Seasons
- ← 2011 2013 →

The 2012 Japanese Formula 3 Championship was an open wheel motor racing series held for Formula 3 cars based in Japan. It was the 34th edition of the Japanese Formula 3 Championship. It commenced on 14 April at Suzuka and ended on 14 October at Fuji Speedway after 15 races held at seven race meetings.

Ryō Hirakawa of the RSS team has dominated the championship and won the title.

== Teams and drivers ==
All teams were Japanese-registered.

Team	Chassis	Engine	No.	Driver	Rounds
Championship Class
B-Max Engineering	Dallara F312	Toyota 1AZ-FE	1	(Japan) Hideki Yamauchi	All
Toda Racing	Dallara F308	Mugen-Honda MF204C	2	(Brazil) Rafael Suzuki	All
CFR Racing	Dallara F308	Mercedes M271.F3	3	(Japan) Ryugo Shimada	1, 5
RSS	Dallara F312	Toyota 1AZ-FE	4	(Japan) Ryō Hirakawa	All
HFDP Racing	Dallara F312	Mugen-Honda MF204C	8	(Japan) Tomoki Nojiri	All
Petronas Team TOM'S	Dallara F312	Toyota 1AZ-FE	36	(Japan) Yuichi Nakayama	All
Petronas Team TOM'S	Dallara F312	Toyota 1AZ-FE	37	(Singapore) Richard Bradley	All
National Class
Hanashima Racing	Dallara F305	Toyota 3S-GE	5	(Japan) Taku Utagawa	7
Hanashima Racing	Dallara F306	Toyota 3S-GE	6	(Japan) Hiroshi Koizumi	All
HFDP Racing	Dallara F307	Toyota 3S-GE	7	(Japan) Kazuki Hiramine	All
B-Max Engineering	Dallara F306	Toyota 3S-GE	13	(Japan) Motoyoshi Yoshida	All
SGC by KCMG	Dallara F308	Toyota 3S-GE	19	(United Kingdom) Matt Howson	2–6
SGC by KCMG	Dallara F308	Toyota 3S-GE	19	(Japan) Naoya Gamou	7
SGC by KCMG	Dallara F308	Toyota 3S-GE	20	(Republic of Ireland) Gary Thompson	1
SGC by KCMG	Dallara F307	Toyota 3S-GE	20	(Republic of Ireland) Gary Thompson	2–7
NDDP Racing	Dallara F306	Toyota 3S-GE	23	(Japan) Daiki Sasaki	All
TOM'S Spirit	Dallara F306	Toyota 3S-GE	35	(Japan) Takamoto Katsuta	All
CMS Motor Sports Project	Dallara F306	Toyota 3S-GE	77	(Japan) Ryohei Sakaguchi	1
CMS Motor Sports Project	Dallara F306	Toyota 3S-GE	77	(Japan) Tatsuru Noro	3–4, 6–7

== Race calendar and results ==
All rounds were held in Japan.

Round		Circuit	Date	Pole position	Fastest lap	Winning driver	Winning team	National winner
1	R1	Suzuka Circuit	14 April	(Japan) Hideki Yamauchi	(Singapore) Richard Bradley	(Japan) Ryō Hirakawa	RSS	(Japan) Daiki Sasaki
1	R2	Suzuka Circuit	15 April	(Japan) Ryō Hirakawa	(Japan) Ryō Hirakawa	(Japan) Ryō Hirakawa	RSS	(Japan) Daiki Sasaki
2	R1	Twin Ring Motegi	12 May	(Japan) Ryō Hirakawa	(Japan) Yuichi Nakayama	(Japan) Hideki Yamauchi	B-Max Engineering	(Japan) Kazuki Hiramine
2	R2	Twin Ring Motegi	13 May	(Japan) Ryō Hirakawa	(Japan) Yuichi Nakayama	(Japan) Yuichi Nakayama	Petronas Team TOM'S	(Japan) Kazuki Hiramine
3	R1	Fuji Speedway	14 July	(Japan) Ryō Hirakawa	(Japan) Ryō Hirakawa	(Japan) Ryō Hirakawa	RSS	(Japan) Kazuki Hiramine
3	R2	Fuji Speedway	15 July	(Republic of Ireland) Gary Thompson	(Japan) Ryō Hirakawa	(Japan) Ryō Hirakawa	RSS	(Japan) Kazuki Hiramine
4	R1	Twin Ring Motegi	4 August	(Japan) Ryō Hirakawa	(Japan) Ryō Hirakawa	(Japan) Ryō Hirakawa	RSS	(Republic of Ireland) Gary Thompson
4	R2	Twin Ring Motegi	5 August	(Japan) Ryō Hirakawa	(Japan) Ryō Hirakawa	(Japan) Ryō Hirakawa	RSS	(Japan) Daiki Sasaki
5	R1	Okayama International Circuit	25 August	(Japan) Ryō Hirakawa	(Japan) Tomoki Nojiri	(Japan) Ryō Hirakawa	RSS	(Japan) Daiki Sasaki
5	R2	Okayama International Circuit	26 August	(Japan) Tomoki Nojiri	(Japan) Tomoki Nojiri	(Japan) Tomoki Nojiri	HFDP Racing	(Japan) Daiki Sasaki
6	R1	Sportsland SUGO	22 September	(Japan) Yuichi Nakayama	(Japan) Yuichi Nakayama	(Japan) Yuichi Nakayama	Petronas Team TOM'S	(Japan) Daiki Sasaki
6	R2	Sportsland SUGO	23 September	(Japan) Yuichi Nakayama	(Japan) Yuichi Nakayama	(Japan) Yuichi Nakayama	Petronas Team TOM'S	(Japan) Daiki Sasaki
6	R3	Sportsland SUGO	23 September	(Japan) Yuichi Nakayama	(Japan) Yuichi Nakayama	(Japan) Yuichi Nakayama	Petronas Team TOM'S	(Japan) Takamoto Katsuta
7	R1	Fuji Speedway	13 October	(Japan) Yuichi Nakayama	(Japan) Yuichi Nakayama	(Japan) Yuichi Nakayama	Petronas Team TOM'S	(Japan) Daiki Sasaki
7	R2	Fuji Speedway	14 October	(Japan) Yuichi Nakayama	(Japan) Yuichi Nakayama	(Japan) Yuichi Nakayama	Petronas Team TOM'S	(Japan) Daiki Sasaki

== Championship standings ==
=== Drivers' Championships ===
- Points are awarded as follows:

1	2	3	4	5	6	PP	FL
10	7	5	3	2	1	**1**	1

==== Overall ====
Pos	Driver	SUZ		MOT		FUJ		MOT		OKA		SUG			FUJ		Pts
1	(Japan) Ryō Hirakawa	1	**1**	**2**	**2**	**1**	1	**1**	**1**	**1**	2	Ret	3	Ret	3	3	118
2	(Japan) Yuichi Nakayama	Ret	5	4	1	2	2	4	4	3	4	**1**	**1**	**1**	**1**	1	103
3	(Japan) Hideki Yamauchi	2	4	1	4	6	4	3	3	5	6	3	4	2	4	4	62
4	(Singapore) Richard Bradley	5	2	3	5	7	5	2	5	6	Ret	2	2	Ret	2	5	52
5	(Japan) Tomoki Nojiri	3	3	5	3	8	Ret	5	2	2	**1**	9	5	6	8	Ret	49
6	(Brazil) Rafael Suzuki	6	8	7	6	3	3	6	6	4	3	4	9	3	6	2	38
7	(Japan) Daiki Sasaki	4	6	8	8	5	10	8	7	7	5	5	6	9	5	**6**	14
8	(Japan) Kazuki Hiramine	7	7	6	7	4	6	10	8	8	7	6	8	5	10	7	8
9	(Japan) Takamoto Katsuta	Ret	9	9	9	10	12	9	10	10	8	8	7	4	7	13	3
10	(Republic of Ireland) Gary Thompson	Ret	10	10	10	9	**9**	7	9	9	10	7	Ret	7	9	9	1
	(United Kingdom) Matt Howson			11	11	Ret	7	11	14	11	9	10	10	8			0
	(Japan) Hiroshi Koizumi	Ret	11	12	12	11	8	12	11	12	11	11	11	10	12	10	0
	(Japan) Naoya Gamou														11	8	0
	(Japan) Ryohei Sakaguchi	8	12														0
	(Japan) Motoyoshi Yoshida	9	13	13	13	13	13	Ret	13	14	12	13	Ret	11	15	12	0
	(Japan) Ryugo Shimada	10	13							13	13						0
	(Japan) Tatsuru Noro					12	11	13	12			12	12	Ret	13	11	0
	(Japan) Taku Utagawa														14	14	0
Pos	Driver	SUZ		MOT		FUJ		MOT		OKA		SUG			FUJ		Pts

Colour	Result
Gold	Winner
Silver	Second place
Bronze	Third place
Green	Points classification
Blue	Non-points classification
Blue	Non-classified finish (NC)
Purple	Retired, not classified (Ret)
Red	Did not qualify (DNQ)
Red	Did not pre-qualify (DNPQ)
Black	Disqualified (DSQ)
White	Did not start (DNS)
White	Withdrew (WD)
White	Race cancelled (C)
Blank	Did not practice (DNP)
Blank	Did not arrive (DNA)
Blank	Excluded (EX)

**Bold** – Pole
Italics – Fastest Lap

==== National Class ====
Pos	Driver	SUZ		MOT		FUJ		MOT		OKA		SUG			FUJ		Pts
1	(Japan) Daiki Sasaki	**4**	**6**	8	**8**	5	10	**8**	**7**	**7**	**5**	**5**	**6**	9	**9**	**6**	146
2	(Japan) Kazuki Hiramine	7	7	**6**	7	**4**	6	10	8	8	7	6	8	5	10	7	110
3	(Japan) Takamoto Katsuta	Ret	9	9	9	10	12	9	10	10	8	8	7	4	7	13	62
4	(Republic of Ireland) Gary Thompson	Ret	10	10	10	9	**9**	7	9	9	10	7	Ret	7	9	9	56
5	(United Kingdom) Matt Howson			11	11	Ret	7	11	14	11	9	10	10	8			28
6	(Japan) Hiroshi Koizumi	Ret	11	12	12	11	8	12	11	12	11	11	11	10	12	10	23
7	(Japan) Naoya Gamou														11	8	7
8	(Japan) Ryohei Sakaguchi	8	12														6
9	(Japan) Tatsuru Noro					12	11	13	12			12	12	Ret	13	11	5
10	(Japan) Motoyoshi Yoshida	9	13	13	13	13	13	Ret	13	14	12	13	Ret	11	15	12	3
Pos	Driver	SUZ		MOT		FUJ		MOT		OKA		SUG			FUJ		Pts

=== Teams' Championships ===
- Points are awarded for races as follows:

1	2	3	4	5	6
10	7	5	3	2	1

Pos	Team	SUZ		MOT		FUJ		MOT		OKA		SUG			FUJ		Pts
Overall
1	RSS	1	1	2	2	1	1	1	1	1	2	Ret	3	Ret	3	3	106
2	Petronas Team TOM'S	5	2	3	1	2	2	2	4	3	4	1	1	1	1	1	106
3	B-Max Engineering	2	4	1	4	6	4	3	3	5	6	3	4	2	4	4	61
4	HFDP Racing	3	3	5	3	4	6	5	2	2	1	6	5	5	8	Ret	52
5	Toda Racing	6	8	7	6	3	3	6	6	4	3	4	9	3	6	2	38
6	NDDP Racing	4	6	8	8	5	10	8	7	7	5	5	6	9	5	6	14
7	TOM'S Spirit	Ret	9	9	9	10	12	9	10	10	8	8	7	4	7	13	3
	SGC by KCMG	Ret	10	10	10	9	7	7	9	9	9	7	10	7	9	8	0
	Hanashima Racing	Ret	11	12	12	11	8	12	11	12	11	11	11	10	12	10	0
	CMS Motor Sports Project	8	12			12	11	13	12			12	12	Ret	13	11	0
	CFR	10	13							13	13						0
Pos	Team	SUZ		MOT		FUJ		MOT		OKA		SUG			FUJ		Pts

=== Engine Tuners' Championship ===
- Points are awarded for races as follows:

1	2	3	4	5	6
10	7	5	3	2	1

Pos	Engine	SUZ		MOT		FUJ		MOT		OKA		SUG			FUJ		Pts
1	TOM'S (Toyota)	1	1	1	1	1	1	1	1	1	2	1	1	1	1	1	147
2	Toda Racing (Mugen-Honda)	3	3	5	3	3	3	5	2	2	1	4	5	3	5	2	71
	HWA (Mercedes)	10	13							13	13						0
Pos	Engine	SUZ		MOT		FUJ		MOT		OKA		SUG			FUJ		Pts
