= Daiki Sasaki =

Japanese racing driver

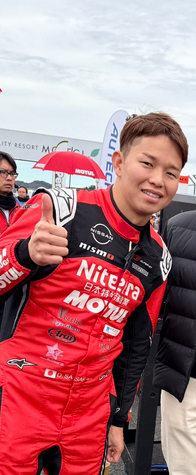
- Sasaki in 2025
- Nationality: (Japan) Japanese
- Born: 15 October 1991 (age 35) Kawaguchi, Saitama, Japan

Super GT - GT500 career
- Debut season: 2012
- Current team: NISMO NDDP
- Car number: 3
- Former teams: Team Impul, Kondo Racing
- Starts: 88
- Wins: 3
- Poles: 3
- Best finish: 7th in 2016

Previous series
- 2012–13, 24 2010–13 2008–09: Super GT - GT300; All-Japan Formula Three Championship; Formula Challenge Japan

Championship titles
- 2012: Japanese Formula 3 Championship - National Class

Daiki Sasaki (佐々木大樹, Sasaki Daiki; born 15 October 1991) is a Japanese racing driver who last competed in Super GT for Kondo Racing. He was champion of the National Class of the Japanese Formula 3 Championship in 2012.

== Career ==
Sasaki has raced in Japanese Formula 3 Championship for two seasons in National class and one of the season in 2012 he won the title. He is a Nissan Driver Development Program (NDDP) Since 2011. He competed in Super GT in the GT300 Class in 2012 for two rounds, and competed full time in 2013 with NDDP Racing. Then promoted to the GT500 Class. He also competed back to Japanese Formula 3 for two seasons, in 2014 he competed full-time with B-Max Racing Team with NDDP with Mitsunori Takaboshi. He continued compete in Japanese Formula 3 in 2015 & 2016, but only a few cameos. He also attended his first Macau Grand Prix. And most of his career competes in Super GT 500 racing with Kondo Racing from 2014 to 2017 and Team Impul from 2018 towards 2020. He returned to his old team, Kondo Racing in 2021 alongside his old teammate Takaboshi and in 2022 with Kohei Hirate.

== Racing record ==
=== Career summary ===
(key)

Season	Series	Team	Races	Wins	Poles	FLaps	Podiums	Points	Position
2008	Formula Challenge Japan	NDDP FCJ	14	0	0	0	0	29	15th
2009	Formula Challenge Japan	NDDP Autobacs FCJ	14	3	3	3	6	70	**2nd**
2009	Formula BMW Pacific	Eurasia Motorsport	2	0	0	0	0	0	NC†
2010	Japanese Formula 3 Championship - National Class	Team Nova	16	0	0	1	2	29	7th
2011	Japanese Formula 3 Championship - National Class	NDDP Racing	14	1	0	0	6	58	4th
2012	Japanese Formula 3 Championship - National Class	NDDP Racing	15	9	11	13	13	146	**1st**
2012	Super GT - GT300	NDDP Racing	2	0	0	0	1	2	24th
2013	Super GT - GT300	NDDP Racing	8	0	1	0	0	14	17th
2014	Super GT - GT500	Kondō Racing	8	0	0	1	1	35	10th
2014	Japanese Formula 3 Championship	B-Max Racing Team with NDDP	15	2	2	3	6	63	5th
2015	Super GT - GT500	Kondō Racing	8	1	0	0	2	31	10th
2015	Japanese Formula 3 Championship	B-Max Racing Team with NDDP	2	0	0	0	0	5	9th
2016	Super GT - GT500	Kondō Racing	8	2	0	2	2	43	7th
2016	Japanese Formula 3 Championship	B-Max Racing Team with NDDP	4	2	1	3	2	29	7th
2016	Macau Grand Prix	B-Max Racing	1	0	0	0	0	0	22nd
2017	Super GT - GT500	Kondō Racing	8	0	0	0	0	12	16th
2017	FRD LMP3 Series	B-Max Racing Team							
2018	Super GT - GT500	Team Impul	8	0	0	0	1	29	12th
2019	Super GT - GT500	Team Impul	8	0	0	0	1	17.5	113th
2020	Super GT – GT500	Team Impul	8	0	0	0	1	24	15th
2021	Super GT - GT500	Kondō Racing	8	0	0	0	1	20	15th
2022	Super GT - GT500	Kondō Racing	7	0	0	0	2	30.5	9th
2022	Super Taikyū - ST-Q	NISMO	1	0	0	0	1	N/A‡	NC‡
2023	Super GT - GT500	Kondō Racing	8	0	1	0	0	11	16th
2023	Super Taikyū - ST-Q	NISMO	2	2	2	2	2	N/A‡	NC‡
2024	Super GT - GT300	Kondo Racing	8	0	0	0	2	32	7th
2024	Super Taikyu - ST-Q	NISMO	2	0	1	1	2	N/A‡	NC‡
2024	Super Taikyu - ST-X	Team HandWork Challenge	1	0	0	0	0	0	NC‡
2025	Super GT - GT500	NISMO NDDP	8	0	1	0	1	24	12th
2025	Super Taikyu - ST-Q	NISMO							
2026	Super GT - GT500	NISMO	1	0	0	0	0	3	16th

=== Complete Super GT results ===
(key) (Races in bold indicate pole position) (Races in italics indicate fastest lap)

Year	Team	Car	Class	1	2	3	4	5	6	7	8	9	DC	Points
2012	NDDP Racing	Nissan GT-R NISMO GT3	GT300	OKA	FUJ	SEP	SUG	SUZ; 2	FUJ; 9	AUT	MOT		24th	2
2013	NDDP Racing	Nissan GT-R NISMO GT3	GT300	OKA; Ret	FUJ; Ret	SEP; 10	SUG; 9	SUZ; 9	FUJ; 5	FUJ	**AUT**; Ret	MOT; 9	17th	14
2014	Kondō Racing	Nissan GT-R NISMO GT500	GT500	OKA; 12	FUJ; 4	AUT; 13	SUG; 10	FUJ; 15	SUZ; 9	BUR; 2	MOT; 4		10th	35
2015	Kondō Racing	Nissan GT-R NISMO GT500	GT500	OKA; 11	FUJ; 11	BUR; Ret	FUJ; 1	SUZ; 13	SUG; 3	AUT; 15	MOT; 12		10th	31
2016	Kondō Racing	Nissan GT-R NISMO GT500	GT500	OKA; 13	FUJ; 9	SUG; 1	FUJ; Ret	SUZ; 12	CHA; 13	MOT; 1	MOT; 10		7th	43
2017	Kondō Racing	Nissan GT-R NISMO GT500	GT500	OKA; 10	FUJ; 12	AUT; 9	SUG; Ret	FUJ; 13	**SUZ**; 5	CHA; Ret	MOT; 12		16th	12
2018	Team Impul	Nissan GT-R NISMO GT500	GT500	OKA; 14	FUJ; 6	SUZ; 4	CHA; 6	FUJ; 12	SUG; 3	AUT; 11	MOT; 11		12th	29
2019	Team Impul	Nissan GT-R NISMO GT500	GT500	OKA; 3‡	FUJ; 12	SUZ; 10	BUR; 8	FUJ; 5	AUT; 12	SUG; 14	MOT; Ret		13th	17.5
2020	Team Impul	Nissan GT-R NISMO GT500	GT500	FSW; Ret	FSW; 11	SUZ; 12	MOT; 12	FSW; 8	SUZ; 2	MOT; 9	FSW; 7		15th	24
2021	Kondō Racing	Nissan GT-R NISMO GT500	GT500	FUJ; 14	FUJ; 12	SUZ; 12	MOT; 3	FUJ; 6	SUZ; 14	MOT; 7	FUJ; 11		15th	20
2022	Kondō Racing	Nissan Z NISMO GT500	GT500	OKA; 14	FUJ; 8	SUZ; 6	FUJ; 3	SUZ; 10	SUG; 14	AUT; 3	MOT; Ret		9th	30.5
2023	Kondō Racing	Nissan Z NISMO GT500	GT500	OKA; 14	FUJ; 15	SUZ; 8	**FUJ**; 10	SUZ; 13	SUG; 5	AUT; 12	MOT; 14		16th	11
2024	Kondō Racing	Nissan GT-R NISMO GT3	GT300	OKA; 15	FUJ; 2	SUZ; 16	FUJ; 3	SUG; 11	AUT; 12	MOT; 8	SUZ; Ret		7th	32
2025	NISMO NDDP	Nissan Z NISMO GT500	GT500	OKA; 10	FUJ; 10	SEP; 11	FS1; 8	FS2 (6)	SUZ; 3	SUG; 12	**AUT**; 7	MOT; 9	12th	24
2026	NISMO	Nissan Z NISMO GT500	GT500	OKA	FUJ	FUJ	SUZ	SUG; 8	AUT	MOT	MOT		16th	3

^{‡} Half points awarded as less than 75% of race distance was completed.
^{(Number)} Driver did not take part in this sprint race, points are still awarded for the teammate's result.
^{*} Season still in progress.
