= Yuichi Nakayama =

Japanese racing driver

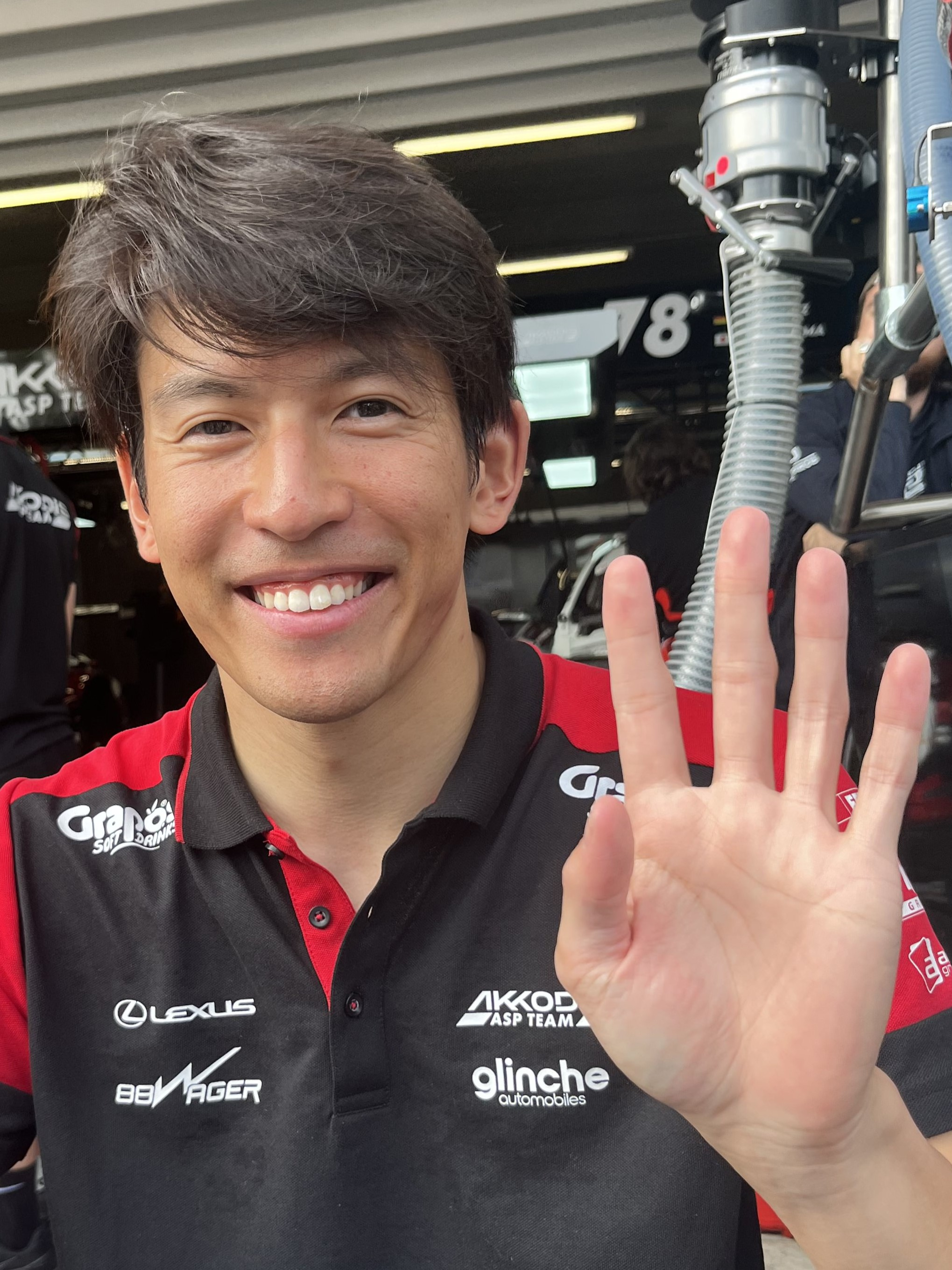
- Nakayama at the 2025 6 Hours of São Paulo
- Nationality: Japanese
- Born: 25 July 1991 (age 35) Setagaya City, Tokyo, Japan

Super GT career
- Debut season: 2021
- Current team: TGR Team SARD
- Categorisation: FIA Gold
- Car number: 39
- Former teams: apr, LM Corsa
- Starts: 74 (34 in GT300)
- Wins: 9 (7 in GT300)
- Podiums: 16 (11 in GT300)
- Poles: 4 (4 in GT300)
- Fastest laps: 1 (1 in GT300)
- Best finish: 5th in 2019

Super Formula career
- Debut season: 2014
- Current team: Kondō Racing
- Car number: 4
- Former teams: KCMG, Team LeMans
- Starts: 36
- Wins: 0
- Poles: 0
- Fastest laps: 1
- Best finish: 16th in 2015

Previous series
- 2011–13 2010 2008–10: All-Japan Formula Three; Formula BMW Pacific; Formula Challenge Japan

Championship titles
- 2013 2010: All-Japan Formula Three; Formula Challenge Japan

Yuichi Nakayama (中山雄一, Nakayama Yūichi; born 25 July 1991) is a Japanese racing driver for Toyota Gazoo Racing who currently competes in Super GT for TGR Team SARD. He previously competed in Super Formula, primarily for KCMG, and became champion of the All-Japan Formula Three Championship in 2013.

== Career ==
=== Karting ===
Born in the Setagaya Ward of Tokyo, Nakayama began his racing career in karting at the age of six and raced in various local championships, progressing to the KF2 category in 2007, finishing seventh in the Asia-Pacific Championship.

=== Early career ===
In 2008, Nakayama graduated to single–seaters into the Formula Challenge Japan mono-series. He finished thirteenth in the series standings, without scoring a podium. He stayed in the series for another season, progressing to fourth position in the standings, collecting six podiums.

Nakayama stayed in the series for a third successive season in 2010. He dominated the whole season and won ten from twelve races, finishing every race in the podium positions and finally taking the championship title. He also contested the final rounds in Formula BMW Pacific, joining the Asia Racing Team.

=== All-Japan Formula Three ===
In 2011, Nakayama stepped up to the National class of the All-Japan Formula Three Championship with the TOM'S Spirit team. He finished third, taking three class wins.

In 2012, Nakayama switched to the series' Championship class, joining the main TOM'S team. He finished as runner-up to Ryō Hirakawa, winning races at Motegi, Sugo and Fuji. During the season he also appeared in the Macau Grand Prix, finishing 21st.

Nakayama continued his collaboration with TOM'S in 2013. This time he dominated the championship, finishing each of the 13 races he contested – 11 wins and a pair of runner-up placings – on the podium, clinching the championship title before the final round of the season, that he was forced to miss. He also repeated his effort to win the Macau Grand Prix trophy with TOM'S.

=== Super Formula ===
Nakayama made his début in Super Formula in 2014 with KCMG. He finished in eighteenth position in the championship standings, without scoring a point. Despite this, the team decided to retain him for the 2015 until 2016 season. Nakayama replaced Artem Markelov at the sixth round due to Markelov being called up to race for BWT Arden in the FIA Formula 2 Championship. Nakayama then returned to KCMG for two rounds to substitute for Kamui Kobayashi. Nakayama covered for Sacha Fenestraz at Kondo Racing after Fenestraz was unable to obtain his visa entrance to Japan. Nakayama did not score a point, and competed all but two rounds that season.

=== Super GT ===
Nakayama made his debut in the series' GT300 Class for apr for one round off in 2013, and 2014. Nakayama joined the team as a full time driver for two seasons, as he was paired with Koki Saga. The pair won three times in those two seasons, and many podiums. Both managed to clinch third place, and runners up place in each season. Nakayama then moved to LM Corsa for 2017 & 2018. Nakayama then stepped up to GT500 with SARD Team in 2019. He is already with the team till now where he raced alongside Heiki Kovalainen for 2019 to 2021, then with GT500 Champion Yuhi Sekiguchi from 2022 onwards.

== Racing record ==
=== Career summary ===
Season	Series	Team	Races	Wins	Poles	FLaps	Podiums	Points	Position
2008	Formula Challenge Japan	TDP Scholarship FCJ	16	0	0	0	0	32	13th
2009	Formula Challenge Japan	FTRS RAJAS FCJ	14	0	0	2	6	41	4th
2010	Formula Challenge Japan	TDP Scholarship	12	10	12	9	12	135	**1st**
2010	Formula BMW Pacific	Asia Racing Team	3	0	0	1	0	0	NC†
2011	Japanese Formula 3 Championship - National	TOM'S Spirit	14	3	1	2	9	83	**3rd**
2012	Japanese Formula 3 Championship	Petronas Team TOM'S	15	6	4	7	9	103	**2nd**
2012	Macau Grand Prix	Petronas Team TOM'S	1	0	0	0	0	N/A	21st
2013	Japanese Formula 3 Championship	Petronas Team TOM'S	13	11	11	11	13	146	**1st**
2013	Macau Grand Prix	Petronas Team TOM'S	1	0	0	0	0	N/A	12th
2013	Super GT - GT300	apr	1	0	0	0	0	0	NC
2014	Super Formula	KCMG	9	0	0	1	0	0	18th
2014	Super Taikyū - ST-1	KeePer Tomei Sports	5	3	2	3	4	111‡	**1st‡**
2014	Super GT - GT300	apr	1	0	0	0	1	18	18th
2015	Super GT - GT300	apr	8	2	2	0	3	69	**3rd**
2015	Super Formula	KCMG	8	0	0	0	0	1.5	16th
2015	Super Taikyū - ST-3	Le Beausset Motorsports						54‡	6th‡
2016	Super GT - GT300	apr	8	2	1	0	2	60	**2nd**
2016	Super Formula	KCMG	9	0	0	0	0	0	18th
2016	Super Taikyū - ST-3	Le Beausset Motorsports		1			3	90.5‡	**2nd‡**
2016	Audi R8 LMS Cup China	KCMG	2	0	0	0	0	7	16th
2017	Super GT - GT300	LM corsa	8	1	0	0	3	61	**3rd**
2017	Super Taikyū - ST-3	Le Beausset Motorsports	5	2	2	1	4	95‡	**2nd‡**
2018	Super GT - GT300	K-tunes Racing LM corsa	8	2	1	0	2	45	6th
2018	Super Formula	carrozzeria Team KCMG	1	0	0	0	0	0	21st
2018	Super Taikyū - ST-4	TOM'S Spirit	6	4	5	2	5	159‡	**1st‡**
2018	24 Hours of Nürburgring - SP-Pro	Toyota Gazoo Racing	1	1	0	0	1	N/A	**1st**
2019	Super GT - GT500	Lexus Team SARD	8	1	0	0	1	44	5th
2019	Super Formula	UOMO Sunoco Team LeMans	2	0	0	0	0	0	22nd
2019	Super Taikyū - ST-4	TOM'S Spirit	6	2	4	1	4	123.5‡	**2nd‡**
2019	24 Hours of Nürburgring - SP-Pro	Toyota Gazoo Racing	1	1	0	1	1	N/A	**1st**
2020	Super GT - GT500	TGR Team SARD	8	1	0	0	1	42	9th
2020	Super Formula	carrozzeria Team KCMG	2	0	0	0	0	0	22nd
2020	Super Taikyū - ST-X	apr	1	0	0	0	1	79‡	5th‡
2021	Super GT - GT500	TGR Team SARD	8	0	0	0	0	34	13th
2021	Super Formula	Kondō Racing	5	0	0	0	0	0	23rd
2021	Super Taikyū - ST-X	Porsche Center Okazaki	5	1	3	0	3	98.5‡	**3rd‡**
2021	Super Taikyū - ST-X	apr	1	0	0	0	0	64‡	5th‡
2022	Super GT - GT500	TGR Team SARD	8	0	0	0	1	33	8th
2022	Super Taikyū - ST-1	Tracy Sports	6	1	2	0	5	128‡	**3rd‡**
2023	Super GT - GT500	TGR Team SARD	8	0	0	0	2	38	9th
2023	Super Taikyū - ST-X	apr	1	0	0	0	0	118‡	**2nd‡**
2023	TGR GR86/BRZ Cup	Ibaraki Toyopet Racing Team	5	1	0	0	2	49	5th
2024	Super GT - GT500	TGR Team SARD	8	1	0	1	2	46	7th
2024	Super Taikyu - ST-X	apr							
2024	Michelin Pilot Challenge - GS	TGR Team Hattori Motorsports	1	0	0	0	0	100	71st
2024	TGR GR86/BRZ Cup	Ibaraki Toyopet Racing Team	8	0	0	1	2	53	5th
2025	FIA World Endurance Championship - LMGT3	Akkodis ASP Team							
2025	Super Taikyu - ST-Q	GR Team Spirit							
2025	Nürburgring Langstrecken-Serie - SP8T	Toyo Tires with Ring Racing							
2025	Nürburgring Langstrecken-Serie - SP8T	KCMG							
2025	GT World Challenge Europe Endurance Cup	Nordique Racing	4	0	0	0	0	0	NC
2025	TGR GR86/BRZ Cup	Ibaraki Toyopet Racing Team	4	0	0	0	0	18	12th
2026	Nürburgring Langstrecken-Serie - SP9	Toyo Tires with Ring Racing							
2026	Nürburgring Langstrecken-Serie - SP10	Toyo Tires with Ring Racing							
2026	24 Hours of Nürburgring - SP9 Pro-Am	Toyo Tires with Ring Racing	1	0	0	0	0	N/A	7th
2026	GT World Challenge Asia	Porsche Centre Okazaki	2	0	0	0	0	0	NC
2026	Super Taikyu - ST-Q	GR Team Spirit							
2026	TGR GR86/BRZ Cup	Ibaraki Toyopet Racing Team							

†– As Nakayama was a guest driver, he was ineligible for points. ^{*} Season still in progress.

‡ Team standings.

=== Complete Super GT results ===
(key) (Races in bold indicate pole position) (Races in italics indicate fastest lap)

Year	Team	Car	Class	1	2	3	4	5	6	7	8	9	DC	Points
2013	apr	Toyota Prius	GT300	OKA	FUJ	SEP	SUG	SUZ; 15	FUJ	FUJ	AUT	MOT	NC	0
2014	apr	Toyota Prius	GT300	OKA	FUJ	AUT	SUG	FUJ	SUZ; 2	CHA	MOT		18th	18
2015	apr	Toyota Prius	GT300	OKA; 1	**FUJ**; 4	CHA; 9	FUJ; 9	SUZ; 10	SUG; 2	AUT; 13	**MOT**; 1		3rd	69
2016	apr	Toyota Prius	GT300	OKA; 12	FUJ; 20	SUG; 1	FUJ; 25	SUZ; 2	CHA; 5	MOT; 24	**MOT**; 2		2nd	60
2017	LM corsa	Lexus RC F GT3	GT300	OKA; 8	FUJ; 1	AUT; 6	SUG; 13	FUJ; 9	SUZ; 6	CHA; 1	MOT; 6		3rd	61
2018	K-tunes Racing LM corsa	Lexus RC F GT3	GT300	OKA; 14	FUJ; 14	**SUZ**; 1	CHA; 10	FUJ; 10	AUT; 14	SUG; 1	MOT; 10		6th	45
2019	Lexus Team SARD	Lexus LC 500	GT500	OKA; 11	FUJ; 4	SUZ; 5	CHA; 5	FUJ; Ret	AUT; 1	SUG; 7	MOT; 11		5th	44
2020	TGR Team SARD	Toyota GR Supra	GT500	FUJ; 5	FUJ; 6	SUZ; 5	MOT; 9	FUJ; 1	SUZ; 11	MOT; 8	FUJ; 14		9th	42
2021	TGR Team SARD	Toyota GR Supra	GT500	OKA; 4	FUJ; 6	SUZ; 10	MOT; 14	SUG; 5	AUT; 5	MOT; 11	FUJ; 4		13th	34
2022	TGR Team SARD	Toyota GR Supra	GT500	OKA; 8	FUJ; 13	SUZ; 4	FUJ; 6	SUZ; 3	SUG; 6	AUT; 10	MOT; Ret		8th	33
2023	TGR Team SARD	Toyota GR Supra	GT500	OKA; 8	FUJ; 8	SUZ; 15	FUJ; 9	SUZ; 2	SUG; 3	AUT; 14	MOT; 7		9th	38
2024	TGR Team SARD	Toyota GR Supra	GT500	OKA; 2^{2}	FUJ; 9	SUZ; 11	FUJ; 15	SUG; 1	AUT; 5	MOT; 10	SUZ; 11		7th	46

^{*} Season still in progress.

=== Complete Super Formula results ===
(Races in bold indicate pole position)

Year	Team	Engine	1	2	3	4	5	6	7	8	9	DC	Points
2014	KCMG	Toyota	SUZ; Ret	FUJ1; 13	FUJ2; 16	FUJ; 10	MOT; Ret	AUT; 16	SUG; 13	SUZ1; Ret	SUZ2; 18	18th	0
2015	KCMG	Toyota	SUZ; 13	OKA; Ret	FUJ; 15	MOT; 16	AUT; 19	SUG; 10	SUZ; Ret	SUZ; 6		16th	1.5
2016	KCMG	Toyota	SUZ; 13	OKA; 10	FUJ; 9	MOT; 15	OKA; 17	OKA; 13	SUG; Ret	SUZ; 14	SUZ; 11	18th	0
2018	carrozzeria Team KCMG	Toyota	SUZ	AUT	SUG	FUJ	MOT; 13	OKA	SUZ			21st	0
2019	UOMO Sunoco Team LeMans	Toyota	SUZ	AUT	SUG	FUJ	MOT	OKA; 15	SUZ; 16			22nd	0
2020	carrozzeria Team KCMG	Toyota	MOT	OKA; 11	SUG	AUT; 18	SUZ	SUZ	FUJ			22nd	0
2021	Kondō Racing	Toyota	FUJ; 14	SUZ; 14	AUT; 15	SUG; Ret	MOT; 13	OKA	SUZ			23rd	0

=== Complete FIA World Endurance Championship results ===
(key) (Races in bold indicate pole position; races in italics indicate fastest lap)

Year	Entrant	Class	Car	Engine	1	2	3	4	5	6	7	8	Rank	Points
2025	Akkodis ASP Team	LMGT3	Lexus RC F GT3	Lexus 2UR-GSE 5.0 L V8	QAT	IMO	**SPA**; 8	LMS	SÃO; 5	COA	FUJ	BHR	22nd	15

^{*} Season still in progress.

Sporting positions
Preceded by Kazuki Miura	Formula Challenge Japan; Champion; 2010	Succeeded by Takamoto Katsuta
Preceded by Ryo Hirakawa	All-Japan Formula Three Championship; Champion; 2013	Succeeded by Nobuharu Matsushita
