= Hiroshi Koizumi (racing driver) =

Japanese racing driver (born 1969)

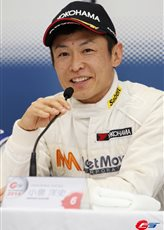
- Koizumi in 2014
- Nationality: (Japan) Japanese
- Born: 25 May 1969 (age 57) Kanagawa, Japan
- Categorisation: FIA Silver (until 2019); FIA Bronze (2022–)

Championship titles
- 2025 2014: European Le Mans Series – LMGT3; Japanese Formula 3 Championship – National

Hiroshi Koizumi (小泉 洋史, Koizumi Hiroshi; born 25 May 1969 in Kanagawa) is a Japanese racing driver who last competed for TF Sport in the LMGT3 class of the European Le Mans Series.

== Career ==
=== Early beginnings and National Japanese F3 title (2004–2015) ===
Koizumi made his car-racing debut in 2004, racing in the Honda Integra Kanto Series, where he took a best result of second in the second round. The following year, he switched to Super Taikyu, racing in the ST-3 class for Tomei Sports alongside Akira Yoshitomi. Finishing sixth in class on debut at Sendai, Koizumi took his best result of the season at the following round at Suzuka despite incurring a ten-second penalty. Having completed four of the eight races in the Super Taikyu schedule, Koizumi and Tomei Sports finished 11th in the ST-3 standings. During 2005, Koizumi also raced in the Suzuka 1000 km for Gaikoku-ya Advan Porsche in the GT300 class. On his GT300 debut, Koizumi finished third in class and sixth overall.

After racing in Formula Toyota in 2006, Koizumi returned to GT300 competition in 2007 by joining Team Gaikokuya in Super GT. Koizumi competed in Super GT on a near-full-time basis until 2011, during which he scored a best result of seventh at the 2010 Pokka GT Summer Special. After concentrating on Japanese Formula 3, Koizumi returned to Super GT in 2015, joining apr alongside Yuki Iwasaki. Completing his first full season in Super GT competition with apr, Koizumi took two 13th-place results as best finishes across the eight-race season in both the season-opener at Okayama and Suzuka.

Returning to single-seaters in 2009, Koizumi joined CMS Motor Sports Project in the National class of the Japanese Formula 3 Championship. Following two seasons with CMS, Koizumi switched to Hanashima Racing, with whom he'd clinch the National class title in 2014 after winning eight of the 15 races. During his five-year tenure in F3, Koizumi also won the 2013 3 Hours of Fuji as he made a one-off appearance in the LMP2 class of the Asian Le Mans Series for KCMG.

=== Return to racing and international debut (2022–) ===
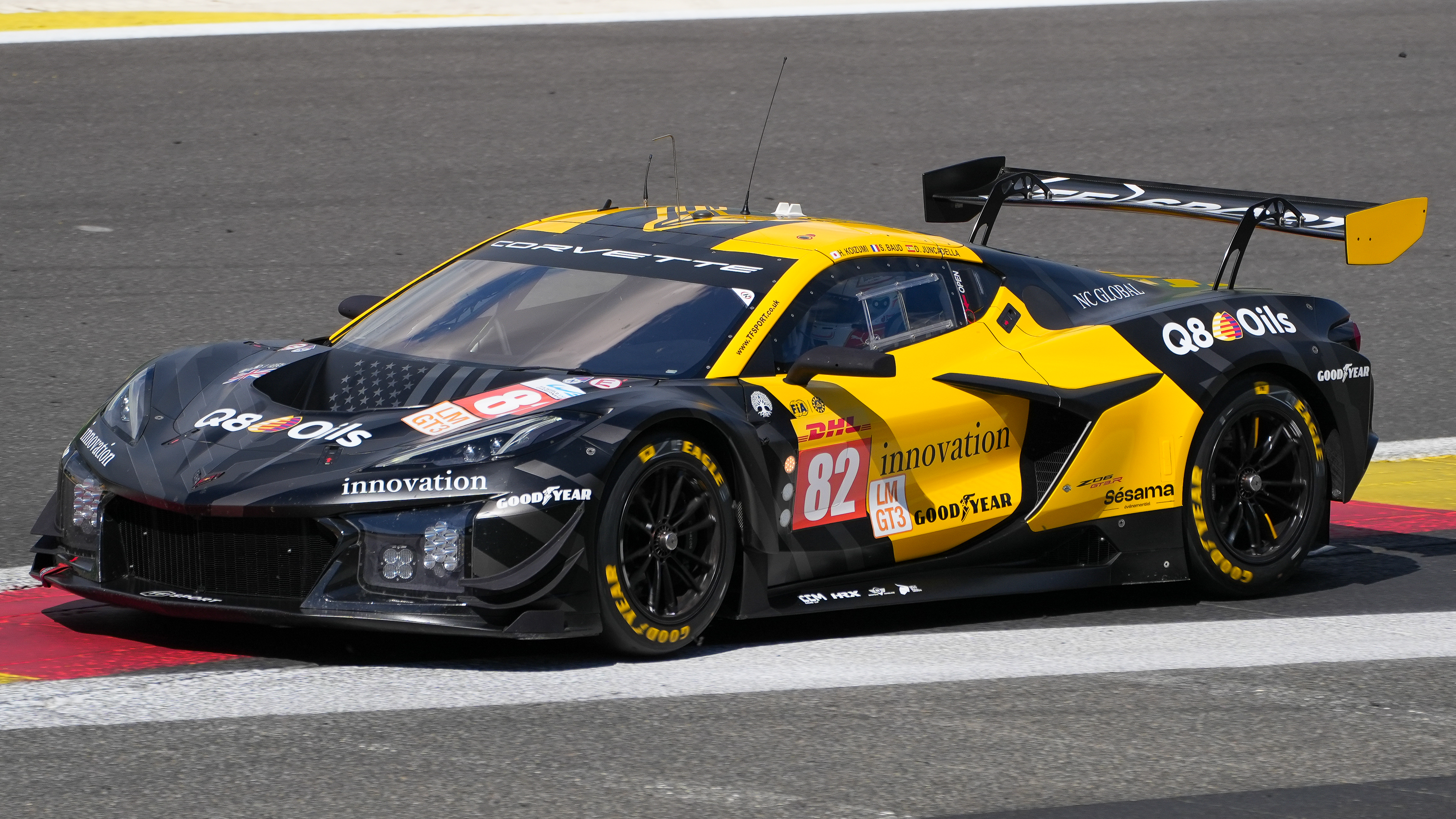
Koizumi at the 2024 6 Hours of Spa-Francorchamps.

Following a seven-year hiatus, Koizumi returned to racing in 2022, joinning ABSSA Motorsport in GT World Challenge Asia alongside Keita Sawa. Taking a best result of fourth in race one at the season-ending Okayama round, the pair ended the season 12th overall and eighth in the Pro-Am standings. At the end of 2022, Koizumi joined AF Corse to make his debut at the final round of the Michelin Le Mans Cup in the GT3 class alongside Kei Cozzolino. The duo started third and held off Jan Magnussen in the closing stages to win on debut.

Returning to AF Corse for 2023, Koizumi raced in the Michelin Le Mans Cup on a full-time basis, alongside Kei Cozzolino marking his first season outside of Japan. The pair finished third in the season-opening round at Barcelona, before winning the penultimate round of the season in Aragón and finishing runner-up in the standings to Racing Spirit of Léman. During 2023, Koizumi also made his WEC debut, racing in at the penultimate round of the season at Fuji alongside Simon Mann and Kei Cozzolino. Qualifying fifth but later getting his time deleted on debut, Koizumi finished his first WEC race in 12th.

In 2024, Koizumi joined TF Sport to make his full-time WEC debut in the LMGT3 class alongside Daniel Juncadella and Sébastien Baud. At Losail, Koizumi qualified 11th, and despite a drive-through penalty for Juncadella for violating track limits later in the race, was able to finish tenth to take his first points in the series. At the penultimate round of the season at Fuji, Koizumi advanced to hyperpole and qualified seventh in LMGT3. In the race, Koizumi ran sixth before his race was ended after his car didn't start following a pit stop. In the final race of the season in Bahrain, Koizumi took his maiden WEC podium by finishing third, which helped him finish 14th in the driver's standings.

Koizumi remained with TF Sport for 2025, albeit switching to the European Le Mans Series, alongside Rui Andrade and Charlie Eastwood. In their first season together, the trio won at Imola and Algarve, as well as standing on the podium at Silverstone, en route to the LMGT3 title at season's end.

== Racing record ==
=== Racing career summary ===
Season	Series	Team	Races	Wins	Poles	F/Laps	Podiums	Points	Position
2004	Integra Kanto Series		??	??	??	??	1	??	??
2005	Super Taikyu – ST-3	Tomei Sports	4	0	0	0	1	26‡	11th‡
2005	Suzuka 1000 km – GT300	Gaikoku-ya Advan Porsche	1	0	0	0	1	N/A	**3rd**
2006	Formula Toyota	Bomex Casval FT	8	0	0	0	0	0	13th
2007	Super GT – GT300	Team Gaikokuya	4	0	0	0	0	0	NC
2007	Super GT – GT300	Arktech Motorsports	3	0	0	0	0	0	NC
2008	Super GT – GT300	Arktech Motorsports	8	0	0	0	0	3	30th
2009	Super GT – GT300	Tomei Sports	7	0	0	0	0	0	NC
2009	Japanese Formula 3 Championship – National	CMS Motor Sports Project	8	0	0	0	0	1	11th
2010	Super GT – GT300	LMP Motorsport	7	0	0	0	0	10	15th
2010	Japanese Formula 3 Championship – National	CMS Motor Sports Project	6	0	0	0	0	0	14th
2011	Super GT – GT300	Team Taisan	5	0	0	0	0	4	19th
2011	Japanese Formula 3 Championship – National	Hanashima Racing	3	0	0	0	0	1	9th
2012	Japanese Formula 3 Championship – National	Hanashima Racing	15	0	0	0	1	23	6th
2013	Asian Le Mans Series – LMP2	KCMG	1	1	0	0	1	25	8th
2013	Japanese Formula 3 Championship – National	Hanashima Racing	15	0	0	0	8	50	**3rd**
2014	Japanese Formula 3 Championship – National	Hanashima Racing	15	8	6	8	12	124	**1st**
2015	Super GT – GT300	apr	8	0	0	0	0	0	NC
2022	GT World Challenge Asia – GT3 Pro-Am	ABSSA Motorsport	8	0	0	0	1	61	8th
2022	Super Taikyu – ST-X	MP Racing	1	0	0	0	0	35‡	8th‡
2022	Le Mans Cup – GT3	AF Corse	1	1	0	0	1	25	11th
2023	Le Mans Cup – GT3	AF Corse	7	1	0	0	2	77	**2nd**
2023	FIA World Endurance Championship – LMGTE Am	AF Corse	1	0	0	0	0	0	31st
2024	FIA World Endurance Championship – LMGT3	TF Sport	8	0	0	0	1	37	14th
2025	European Le Mans Series – LMGT3	TF Sport	6	2	1	0	3	78	**1st**

‡ Team standings

=== Complete Super GT results ===
(key) (Races in bold indicate pole position) (Races in italics indicate fastest lap)

Year	Team	Car	Class	1	2	3	4	5	6	7	8	9	DC	Pts
2007	Team Gaikokuya	Porsche 996 GT3-RS	GT300	SUZ; 20	OKA; 20	FUJ; Ret	SEP	SUG; DNQ	SUZ; 15				NC	0
2007	Arktech Motorsports	Porsche 986 Boxster	GT300							MOT; Ret	AUT; 17	FUJ; 19	NC	0
2008	Arktech Motorsports	Porsche 986 Boxster	GT300	SUZ; 15	OKA; 21	FUJ; 14	SEP; 19	SUG; 16	SUZ; 8	MOT; 19	AUT; Ret	FUJ	30th	3
2009	Tomei Sports	Porsche 996 GT3-RSR	GT300	OKA; 14	SUZ; 14	FUJ; 12	SEP	SUG; 14	SUZ; 11	FUJ; 19	AUT	MOT; Ret	14th	12
2010	LMP Motorsport	Ferrari F430	GT300	SUZ; 9	OKA; 11	FUJ; 8	SEP; 10	SUG; DNS	SUZ; 7	FUJ; C	MOT; 13		15th	10
2011	Team Taisan Cinecitta	Ferrari F430	GT300	OKA; 9	FUJ; 9	SEP	SUG; 12	SUZ; 17	FUJ; 21	AUT	MOT		19th	4
2015	apr	Nissan GT-R GT3	GT300	OKA; 13	FSW; 16	CHA; Ret	FSW; 17	SUZ; 13	SUG; 24	AUT; 18	TRM; 18		NC	0

=== Complete Japanese Formula 3 results ===
(key) (Races in bold indicate pole position) (Races in italics indicate fastest lap)

Year	Team	Engine	Class	1	2	3	4	5	6	7	8	9	10	11	12	13	14	15	16	DC	Pts
2009	CMS Motor Sports Project	Toyota	N	FUJ; 1	FUJ; 2	OKA; 1; 7	OKA; 2; 6	SUZ; 1; 8	SUZ; 2 Ret	FUJ; 1	FUJ; 2	SUZ; 1; 8	SUZ; 2; 7	MOT; 1	MOT; 2	AUT; 1; 7	AUT; 2; 8	SUG; 1	SUG; 2	11th	1
2010	CMS Motor Sports Project	Toyota	N	SUZ; 1; 14	SUZ; 2; 15	MOT; 1	MOT; 2	FUJ; 1	FUJ; 2	FUJ; 1; 15	FUJ; 2; 15	MOT; 1; 15	MOT; 2 Ret	OKA; 1	OKA; 2	SUG; 1	SUG; 2	AUT; 1	AUT; 2	14th	0
2011	Hanashima Racing	Toyota	N	SUZ; 1	SUZ; 2	FUJ; 1	FUJ; 2	FUJ; 3	FUJ; 1	FUJ; 2	MOT; 1	MOT; 2	OKA; 1	OKA; 2	SUZ; 1 C	SUZ; 2 C	SUG; 1; 10	SUG; 2; 11	SUG; 3; 13	9th	1
2012	Hanashima Racing	Toyota	N	SUZ; 1 Ret	SUZ; 2; 11	MOT; 1; 12	MOT; 2; 12	FUJ; 1; 11	FUJ; 2; 8	MOT; 1; 12	MOT; 2; 11	OKA; 1; 12	OKA; 2; 11	SUG; 1; 11	SUG; 2; 11	SUG; 3; 10	FUJ; 1; 12	FUJ; 2; 10		6th	23
2013	Hanashima Racing	Toyota	N	SUZ; 1 Ret	SUZ; 2; 9	MOT; 1; 10	MOT; 2; 10	MOT; 3; 10	OKA; 1; 10	OKA; 2 DNS	FUJ; 1; 9	FUJ; 2; 8	MOT; 1 Ret	MOT; 2; 9	SUG; 1; 7	SUG; 2; 8	FUJ; 1; 9	FUJ; 2; 8		3rd	50
2014	Hanashima Racing	Toyota	N	SUZ; 1; 10	SUZ; 2; 11	**MOT**; **1**; 10	MOT; 2; 9	MOT; 3; 11	OKA; 1; 9	**OKA**; **2**; 8	FUJ1; 1; 10	**FUJ1**; **2**; 7	**MOT**; **1**; 8	MOT; 2; 10	SUG; 1 NC	SUG; 2; 11	**FUJ2**; **1**; 9	**FUJ2**; **2**; 10		**1st**	**124**

=== Complete Asian Le Mans Series results ===
(key) (Races in bold indicate pole position) (Races in italics indicate fastest lap)

Year	Team	Class	Car	Engine	1	2	3	4	Pos.	Points
2013	KCMG	LMP2	Morgan LMP2	Nissan VK45DE 4.5 L V8	INJ	FUJ; 1	ZHU	SEP	8th	25

^{*} Season still in progress.

=== Complete GT World Challenge Asia results ===
(key) (Races in bold indicate pole position) (Races in italics indicate fastest lap)

Year	Team	Car	Class	1	2	3	4	5	6	7	8	9	10	DC	Points
2022	ABSSA Motorsport	McLaren 720S GT3	GT3 Pro-Am	BUR; 1	BUR; 2	FSW; 1; 12	FSW; 2; 7	SUZ; 1; 15	SUZ; 2; 6	SUG; 1; 6	SUG; 2; 13	OKA; 1; 4	OKA; 2; 14	8th	61

=== Complete Le Mans Cup results ===
(key) (Races in bold indicate pole position; results in italics indicate fastest lap)

Year	Entrant	Class	Chassis	1	2	3	4	5	6	7	Rank	Points
2022	AF Corse	GT3	Ferrari 488 GT3 Evo 2020	LEC	IMO	LMS; 1	LMS; 2	MNZ	SPA	ALG; 1	11th	25
2023	AF Corse	GT3	Ferrari 296 GT3	CAT; 3	LMS; 1; 4	LMS; 2; 16	LEC; 4	ARA; 1	SPA; 6	ALG; 5	2nd	77

=== Complete FIA World Endurance Championship results ===
(key) (Races in bold indicate pole position; races in italics indicate fastest lap)

Year	Entrant	Class	Car	Engine	1	2	3	4	5	6	7	8	Rank	Points
2023	AF Corse	LMGTE Am	Ferrari 488 GTE Evo	Ferrari F154CB 3.9 L Turbo V8	SEB	PRT	SPA	LMS	MNZ	FUJ; 12	BHR		31th	0
2024	TF Sport	LMGT3	Chevrolet Corvette Z06 GT3.R	Chevrolet LT6.R 5.5 L V8	QAT; 10	IMO; 8	SPA; 12	LMS; 9	SÃO; Ret	COA; 8	FUJ; Ret	BHR; 3	14th	37

=== Complete 24 Hours of Le Mans results ===
Year	Team	Co-Drivers	Car	Class	Laps	Pos.	Class Pos.
2024	(United Kingdom) TF Sport	(France) Sébastien Baud (Spain) Daniel Juncadella	Chevrolet Corvette Z06 GT3.R	LMGT3	278	38th	11th

=== Complete European Le Mans Series results ===
(key) (Races in bold indicate pole position; results in italics indicate fastest lap)

Year	Entrant	Class	Chassis	Engine	1	2	3	4	5	6	Rank	Points
2025	TF Sport	LMGT3	Chevrolet Corvette Z06 GT3.R	Chevrolet LT6.R 5.5 L V8	CAT; 6	LEC; Ret	IMO; 1	SPA; 8	SIL; 3	**ALG**; 1	1st	78

^{*} Season still in progress.
