= 2010 Formula Challenge Japan =

Japanese formula racing season

The 2010 Formula Challenge Japan was a multi-event motor racing championship for open-wheel formula racing cars, and the fifth season of the Formula Challenge Japan racing series, a young driver development series jointly supported by Honda, Toyota, and Nissan. The championship featured a mix of manufacturer-affiliated drivers and independent entries, and commenced on 22 May and ended on 7 November. Four race weekends were run in support of Formula Nippon, with the October round at Suzuka being held in support of the Formula One Japanese Grand Prix.

Toyota junior driver Yūichi Nakayama dominated the championship, taking pole position in every qualifying session and winning ten of the twelve races on the calendar to complete the most successful campaign in series history. Nissan-supported Takamitsu Matsui finished the season as runner-up with one race win, having scored less than half of Nakayama's total points, ahead of top-placed rookie and Honda junior Kazuki Hiramine. Honda stablemate Yūya Motojima claimed the remaining race victory.

== Teams and drivers ==
Team	No.	Driver	Rounds
TDP Scholarship; TMC FCJ	1	(Japan) Yūichi Nakayama	All
TDP Scholarship; TMC FCJ	6	(Japan) Ryōsuke Kagami	All
HFDP/SRS-F/ARTA/Kotira R HFDP/SRS Scholarship/Kotira R	2	(Japan) Tomoki Nojiri	All
HFDP/SRS-F/ARTA/Kotira R HFDP/SRS Scholarship/Kotira R	7	(Japan) Kazuki Hiramine	All
HFDP/SRS-F/ARTA/Kotira R HFDP/SRS Scholarship/Kotira R	18	(Japan) Shinji Nakamura	All
HFDP/SRS-F/ARTA/Kotira R HFDP/SRS Scholarship/Kotira R	19	(Japan) Yūya Motojima	All
Dragon Knight	3	(China) Zhu Hu'an	All
Clarion FCJ	4	(Japan) Ryō Hirakawa	All
R.Houka Racing	5	(Japan) Ryo Ogawa	All
Winds Garage	8	(Japan) Kei Yamaura	All
K-office FCJ	9	(Japan) Syunsuke Matsuzaki	All
Luck	10	(Japan) Takamoto Katsuta	All
MediaDo FCJ	11	(Japan) Ryōta Tateishi	All
NDDP FCJ; NDDP Maruso FCJ	12	(Japan) Mitsunori Takaboshi	All
NDDP FCJ; NDDP Maruso FCJ	13	(China) Zhu Daiwei	All
NDDP FCJ; NDDP Maruso FCJ	20	(Japan) Takamitsu Matsui	All
NDDP FCJ; NDDP Maruso FCJ	21	(Japan) Tsubasa Kondō	All
Biltmore	14	(Japan) Tobio Ohtani	All
Yagura Animal Hospital	15	(Japan) Yūki Shiraishi	All
Dunlop Team Naoki	16	(Japan) Keishi Niki	All
TAKAGI PLANNING	17	(Japan) Kazuya Ishii	All

== Race calendar and results ==
All races were held in Japan. Rounds 1–2, 5–8, and 10–12 were held in support of the Formula Nippon championship, and Round 9 at Suzuka was held as a support race for the 2010 Japanese Grand Prix, the sixteenth round of the 2010 Formula One World Championship.

Round	Circuit	Date	Pole position	Fastest lap	Winning driver
1	Twin Ring Motegi, Motegi	22 May	(Japan) Yūichi Nakayama	(Japan) Yūichi Nakayama	(Japan) Yūichi Nakayama
2	Twin Ring Motegi, Motegi	23 May	(Japan) Yūichi Nakayama	(Japan) Yūichi Nakayama	(Japan) Yūichi Nakayama
3	Fuji Speedway, Oyama	12 June	(Japan) Yūichi Nakayama	(Japan) Yūichi Nakayama	(Japan) Yūichi Nakayama
4	Fuji Speedway, Oyama	13 June	(Japan) Yūichi Nakayama	(Japan) Yūichi Nakayama	(Japan) Yūichi Nakayama
5	Fuji Speedway, Oyama	17 July	(Japan) Yūichi Nakayama	(Japan) Ryō Hirakawa	(Japan) Yūichi Nakayama
6	Fuji Speedway, Oyama	18 July	(Japan) Yūichi Nakayama	(Japan) Yūya Motojima	(Japan) Yūya Motojima
7	Twin Ring Motegi, Motegi	7 August	(Japan) Yūichi Nakayama	(Japan) Yūichi Nakayama	(Japan) Yūichi Nakayama
8	Twin Ring Motegi, Motegi	8 August	(Japan) Yūichi Nakayama	(Japan) Yūya Motojima	(Japan) Takamitsu Matsui
9	Suzuka Circuit, Suzuka	9 October	(Japan) Yūichi Nakayama	(Japan) Yūichi Nakayama	(Japan) Yūichi Nakayama
10	Suzuka Circuit, Suzuka	6 November	(Japan) Yūichi Nakayama	(Japan) Yūichi Nakayama	(Japan) Yūichi Nakayama
11	Suzuka Circuit, Suzuka	6 November	(Japan) Yūichi Nakayama	(Japan) Yūichi Nakayama	(Japan) Yūichi Nakayama
12	Suzuka Circuit, Suzuka	7 November	(Japan) Yūichi Nakayama	(Japan) Yūichi Nakayama	(Japan) Yūichi Nakayama

== Championship standings ==
=== Drivers' Championship ===
Points were awarded to the top six classified finishers, with one point awarded for pole position and fastest lap respectively.

1	2	3	4	5	6	PP	FL
10	7	5	3	2	1	**1**	1

Pos.	Driver	MOT		FUJ		FUJ		MOT		SUZ	SUZ			Points
1	(Japan) Yūichi Nakayama	**1**	**1**	**1**	**1**	**1**	**2**	**1**	**2**	**1**	**1**	**1**	**1**	135
2	(Japan) Takamitsu Matsui	2	3	3	2	6	Ret	17	1	2	18	2	2	56
3	(Japan) Kazuki Hiramine	3	2	2	7	4	6	3	17	3	2	4	3	48
4	(Japan) Yūya Motojima	7	4	5	6	2	1	20	4	6	11	7	4	32
5	(Japan) Tomoki Nojiri	12	14	21	11	5	5	2	3	4	3	5	6	27
6	(Japan) Ryō Hirakawa	4	8	14	4	3	3	12	Ret	Ret	13	10	10	17
7	(Japan) Tobio Ohtani	6	6	8	5	Ret	8	5	13	5	6	6	5	12
8	(Japan) Takamoto Katsuta	20	15	4	3	7	14	8	16	12	9	Ret	18	8
9	(China) Zhu Daiwei	5	5	6	10	8	9	4	Ret	Ret	20	13	11	8
10	(Japan) Tsubasa Kondō	15	17	9	12	Ret	16	6	8	8	8	3	Ret	6
11	(Japan) Kazuya Ishii	8	7	7	9	10	4	Ret	5	7	14	Ret	9	5
12	(Japan) Ryōta Tateishi	9	10	10	Ret	11	7	13	10	11	4	8	8	3
13	(Japan) Shinji Nakamura	11	11	13	Ret	13	11	10	6	16	5	Ret	7	3
-	(Japan) Yūki Shiraishi	10	9	20	8	Ret	19	7	12	15	7	9	Ret	0
-	(China) Zhu Hu'an	Ret	Ret	16	15	12	13	14	7	Ret	21	15	15	0
-	(Japan) Syunsuke Matsuzaki	14	16	17	16	14	15	9	9	10	10	12	12	0
-	(Japan) Mitsunori Takaboshi	19	13	11	14	9	10	11	DSQ	14	12	14	14	0
-	(Japan) Keishi Niki	13	12	15	13	15	12	15	11	9	15	11	13	0
-	(Japan) Ryō Ogawa	18	19	12	18	17	20	18	14	Ret	19	18	17	0
-	(Japan) Ryōsuke Kagami	17	DSQ	18	17	16	17	19	Ret	13	17	17	16	0
-	(Japan) Kei Yamaura	16	18	19	19	18	18	16	15	17	16	16	19	0
Pos.	Driver	MOT		FUJ		FUJ		MOT		SUZ	SUZ			Points

Key
Colour	Result
Gold	Race winner
Silver	2nd place
Bronze	3rd place
Green	Points finish
Blue	Non-points finish
Blue	Non-classified finish (NC)
Purple	Did not finish (Ret)
Black	Disqualified (DSQ)
Black	Excluded (EX)
White	Did not start (DNS)
White	Race cancelled (C)
White	Withdrew (WD)
Blank	Did not participate

**Bold** – Pole
Italics – Fastest Lap
