= 2026 GT World Challenge Asia =

Motor racing competition season

The 2026 GT World Challenge Asia Powered by AWS is the seventh season of the GT World Challenge Asia, an auto racing series for grand tourer cars in Asia, co-promoted by the SRO Motorsports Group and Team Asia One GT Management. The races contested with GT3-spec cars. The season began on 4 April at the Sepang International Circuit in Malaysia and is scheduled to end on 1 November in the Shanghai International Circuit in China.

== Calendar ==
Round	Circuit	Date	Location
1	(Malaysia) Sepang International Circuit, Sepang District, Selangor	4–5 April	2026 GT World Challenge Asia is located in Asia
2	(Indonesia) Mandalika International Street Circuit, Central Lombok, West Nusa Tenggara	2–3 May	2026 GT World Challenge Asia is located in Asia
3	(Japan) Fuji Speedway, Oyama, Shizuoka	11–12 July	2026 GT World Challenge Asia is located in Asia
4	(Japan) Okayama International Circuit, Mimasaka, Okayama	29–30 August	2026 GT World Challenge Asia is located in Asia
5	Beijing Street Circuit, Beijing, China	3–4 October	2026 GT World Challenge Asia is located in Asia
6	(China) Shanghai International Circuit, Jiading, Shanghai	31 October- 1 November	2026 GT World Challenge Asia is located in Asia

== Entry list ==
Team	Car	Engine	No.	Drivers	Class	Rounds
(China) Origine Motorsport	Porsche 911 GT3 R (992.2)	Porsche M97/80 4.2 L Flat-6	4	(Belgium) Alessio Picariello	PA	1–2
(China) Origine Motorsport	Porsche 911 GT3 R (992.2)	Porsche M97/80 4.2 L Flat-6	4	(China) Lu Wei	PA	1–2
(China) Origine Motorsport	Porsche 911 GT3 R (992.2)	Porsche M97/80 4.2 L Flat-6	11	(China) Lu Wei	PA	3–6
(China) Origine Motorsport	Porsche 911 GT3 R (992.2)	Porsche M97/80 4.2 L Flat-6	11	(Germany) Laurin Heinrich	PA	3–4, 6
(China) Origine Motorsport	Porsche 911 GT3 R (992.2)	Porsche M97/80 4.2 L Flat-6	11	(Netherlands) Loek Hartog	PA	5
(China) Origine Motorsport	Porsche 911 GT3 R (992.2)	Porsche M97/80 4.2 L Flat-6	22	(China) Liu Hangcheng	Am	All
(China) Origine Motorsport	Porsche 911 GT3 R (992.2)	Porsche M97/80 4.2 L Flat-6	22	(China) Wang Zhongwei	Am	All
(Japan) PLUS with BMW M Team Studie	BMW M4 GT3 Evo	BMW P58 3.0 L Turbo I6	5	(Japan) Seiji Ara	PA	1–4
(Japan) PLUS with BMW M Team Studie	BMW M4 GT3 Evo	BMW P58 3.0 L Turbo I6	5	(Japan) Tomohide Yamaguchi	PA	1–4
(China) Climax Racing	Mercedes-AMG GT3 Evo	Mercedes-AMG M159 6.2 L V8	8	(Indonesia) Setiawan Santoso	Am	All
(China) Climax Racing	Mercedes-AMG GT3 Evo	Mercedes-AMG M159 6.2 L V8	8	(China) Zhou Bihuang	Am	All
(China) Climax Racing	Mercedes-AMG GT3 Evo	Mercedes-AMG M159 6.2 L V8	27	(China) Li Lichao	SA	1–3
(China) Climax Racing	Mercedes-AMG GT3 Evo	Mercedes-AMG M159 6.2 L V8	27	(Finland) Elias Seppänen	SA	1–3
(China) Climax Racing	Mercedes-AMG GT3 Evo	Mercedes-AMG M159 6.2 L V8	81	(China) Li Lichao	SA	4–6
(China) Climax Racing	Mercedes-AMG GT3 Evo	Mercedes-AMG M159 6.2 L V8	81	(Finland) Elias Seppänen	SA	4–6
(Japan) GTO with KRC	BMW M4 GT3 Evo	BMW P58 3.0 L Turbo I6	10	(Chinese Taipei) Brian Lee	SA	All
(Japan) GTO with KRC	BMW M4 GT3 Evo	BMW P58 3.0 L Turbo I6	10	(Netherlands) Maxime Oosten	SA	All
(China) Team KRC	BMW M4 GT3 Evo	BMW P58 3.0 L Turbo I6	89	(China) Ruan Cunfan	PA	All
(China) Team KRC	BMW M4 GT3 Evo	BMW P58 3.0 L Turbo I6	89	(United States) Neil Verhagen	PA	1, 4
(China) Team KRC	BMW M4 GT3 Evo	BMW P58 3.0 L Turbo I6	89	(Finland) Jesse Krohn	PA	2, 5
(China) Team KRC	BMW M4 GT3 Evo	BMW P58 3.0 L Turbo I6	89	(Germany) Max Hesse	PA	3
(China) Team KRC	BMW M4 GT3 Evo	BMW P58 3.0 L Turbo I6	89	(Germany) Tim Tramnitz	PA	6
(Malaysia) 33R Harmony Racing	Ferrari 296 GT3 Evo	Ferrari F163CE 3.0 L Turbo V6	13	(China) Sun Jingzu	SA	1–3 (Note: Sun Jingzu was listed to compete for the Fuji round alongside Adderly Fong in the Silver Am class, but he withdrew. Fong continues to competed, but he moved to Silver class for the round.)
(Malaysia) 33R Harmony Racing	Ferrari 296 GT3 Evo	Ferrari F163CE 3.0 L Turbo V6	13	(Hong Kong) Adderly Fong	SA	1–3
(Malaysia) 33R Harmony Racing	Ferrari 296 GT3 Evo	Ferrari F163CE 3.0 L Turbo V6	13	(Hong Kong) Adderly Fong	S	3
(Hong Kong) Apex Predator Harmony Racing	Ferrari 296 GT3 Evo	Ferrari F163CE 3.0 L Turbo V6	72	(New Zealand) Brendon Leitch	PA	3–6
(Hong Kong) Apex Predator Harmony Racing	Ferrari 296 GT3 Evo	Ferrari F163CE 3.0 L Turbo V6	72	(China) Song Jiajun	PA	3–6
(China) Winhere Harmony Racing	Ferrari 296 GT3 Evo	Ferrari F163CE 3.0 L Turbo V6	72	(New Zealand) Brendon Leitch	PA	1–2
(China) Winhere Harmony Racing	Ferrari 296 GT3 Evo	Ferrari F163CE 3.0 L Turbo V6	72	(China) Song Jiajun	PA	1–2
(China) Winhere Harmony Racing	Ferrari 296 GT3	Ferrari F163CE 3.0 L Turbo V6	96	(China) Deng Yi	S	1–2
(China) Winhere Harmony Racing	Ferrari 296 GT3	Ferrari F163CE 3.0 L Turbo V6	96	(Hong Kong) Liu Kai Shun	S	1–2
(China) Harmony Racing	Ferrari 296 GT3	Ferrari F163CE 3.0 L Turbo V6	96	(Hong Kong) Liu Kai Shun	S	3–6
(China) Harmony Racing	Ferrari 296 GT3	Ferrari F163CE 3.0 L Turbo V6	96	(China) Chen Weian	S	3–4, 6
(China) Harmony Racing	Ferrari 296 GT3	Ferrari F163CE 3.0 L Turbo V6	96	(Japan) Takuro Shinohara	S	5
(Hong Kong) Audi Sport Asia Team Phantom	Audi R8 LMS Evo II	Audi DAR 5.2 L V10	15	(New Zealand) Jaxon Evans	PA	All
(Hong Kong) Audi Sport Asia Team Phantom	Audi R8 LMS Evo II	Audi DAR 5.2 L V10	15	(Indonesia) "Andrés Pato"	PA	All
(Hong Kong) FAW Audi Sport Asia Team Phantom	Audi R8 LMS Evo II	Audi DAR 5.2 L V10	16	(China) Cheng Congfu	S	All
(Hong Kong) FAW Audi Sport Asia Team Phantom	Audi R8 LMS Evo II	Audi DAR 5.2 L V10	16	(China) Yu Kuai	S	All
(Japan) Porsche Center Okazaki	Porsche 911 GT3 R (992.2)	Porsche M97/80 4.2 L Flat-6	18	(Japan) Hiroaki Nagai	PA	All
(Japan) Porsche Center Okazaki	Porsche 911 GT3 R (992.2)	Porsche M97/80 4.2 L Flat-6	18	(Japan) Kazuto Kotaka	PA	1, 3–6
(Japan) Porsche Center Okazaki	Porsche 911 GT3 R (992.2)	Porsche M97/80 4.2 L Flat-6	18	(Japan) Yuichi Nakayama	PA	2
(Japan) Porsche Center Okazaki	Porsche 911 GT3 R (992.2)	Porsche M97/80 4.2 L Flat-6	25	(Japan) Tsubasa Kondo	SA	1–4
(Japan) Porsche Center Okazaki	Porsche 911 GT3 R (992.2)	Porsche M97/80 4.2 L Flat-6	25	(Japan) Kiyoshi Uchiyama	SA	1–4
(Malaysia) HZO Fortis Racing by Absolute Racing	Porsche 911 GT3 R (992.2)	Porsche M97/80 4.2 L Flat-6	20	(Malaysia) Aaron Lim Say Joon	Am	3–6
(Malaysia) HZO Fortis Racing by Absolute Racing	Porsche 911 GT3 R (992.2)	Porsche M97/80 4.2 L Flat-6	20	(Malaysia) Haziq Zairel Oh	Am	3–6
(Hong Kong) Absolute Racing	Lamborghini Huracán GT3 Evo 2	Lamborghini DGF 5.2 L V10	29	(Malaysia) Akash Nandy	S	All
(Hong Kong) Absolute Racing	Lamborghini Huracán GT3 Evo 2	Lamborghini DGF 5.2 L V10	29	(Thailand) Sandy Stuvik	S	4–5
(Hong Kong) Absolute Racing	Audi R8 LMS Evo II	Audi DAR 5.2 L V10	98	(Indonesia) "Andy Tan"	PA	3
(Hong Kong) Absolute Racing	Audi R8 LMS Evo II	Audi DAR 5.2 L V10	98	(Netherlands) Thierry Vermeulen	PA	3
(Hong Kong) Absolute Racing	Porsche 911 GT3 R (992.2)	Porsche M97/80 4.2 L Flat-6	911	(France) Alessandro Ghiretti	PA	All
(Hong Kong) Absolute Racing	Porsche 911 GT3 R (992.2)	Porsche M97/80 4.2 L Flat-6	911	(China) Huang Ruohan	PA	All
(Hong Kong) Absolute Racing	Porsche 911 GT3 R (992.2)	Porsche M97/80 4.2 L Flat-6	918	(Thailand) Vutthikorn Inthraphuvasak	PA	1–2
(Hong Kong) Absolute Racing	Porsche 911 GT3 R (992.2)	Porsche M97/80 4.2 L Flat-6	918	(Denmark) Bastian Buus	PA	1
(Hong Kong) Absolute Racing	Porsche 911 GT3 R (992.2)	Porsche M97/80 4.2 L Flat-6	918	(Austria) Klaus Bachler	PA	2, 4
(Hong Kong) Absolute Racing	Porsche 911 GT3 R (992.2)	Porsche M97/80 4.2 L Flat-6	918	(Japan) Kazuki Ota	PA	4
(Hong Kong) Absolute Racing	Porsche 911 GT3 R (992.2)	Porsche M97/80 4.2 L Flat-6	918	(China) Li Kerong	PA	5
(Hong Kong) Absolute Racing	Porsche 911 GT3 R (992.2)	Porsche M97/80 4.2 L Flat-6	918	(Germany) Joel Sturm	PA	5
(Hong Kong) Absolute Racing	Porsche 911 GT3 R (992.2)	Porsche M97/80 4.2 L Flat-6	918	(Belgium) Alessio Picariello	PA	6
(Hong Kong) Absolute Racing	Porsche 911 GT3 R (992.2)	Porsche M97/80 4.2 L Flat-6	918	(Macau) Kevin Tse	PA	6
(Hong Kong) Absolute Corse	Porsche 911 GT3 R (992.2)	Porsche M97/80 4.2 L Flat-6	32	(Australia) Tom Sargent	SA	3
(Hong Kong) Absolute Corse	Porsche 911 GT3 R (992.2)	Porsche M97/80 4.2 L Flat-6	32	(United States) Kyle Washington	SA	3
(Hong Kong) Absolute Corse	Ferrari 296 GT3	Ferrari F163CE 3.0 L Turbo V6	98	(Indonesia) "Andy Tan"	PA	1
(Hong Kong) Absolute Corse	Ferrari 296 GT3	Ferrari F163CE 3.0 L Turbo V6	98	(Netherlands) Thierry Vermeulen	PA	1
(China) Phantom Global Racing	Porsche 911 GT3 R (992.2)	Porsche M97/80 4.2 L Flat-6	37	(China) Anthony Liu Xu	PA	All
(China) Phantom Global Racing	Porsche 911 GT3 R (992.2)	Porsche M97/80 4.2 L Flat-6	37	(France) Dorian Boccolacci	PA	1, 3
(China) Phantom Global Racing	Porsche 911 GT3 R (992.2)	Porsche M97/80 4.2 L Flat-6	37	(Netherlands) Loek Hartog	PA	2, 6
(China) Phantom Global Racing	Porsche 911 GT3 R (992.2)	Porsche M97/80 4.2 L Flat-6	37	(Turkey) Ayhancan Güven	PA	4–5
(Indonesia) Garage 75	Ferrari 296 GT3 Evo	Ferrari F163CE 3.0 L Turbo V6	50	(Indonesia) Sean Gelael	S	2
(Indonesia) Garage 75	Ferrari 296 GT3 Evo	Ferrari F163CE 3.0 L Turbo V6	75	(Italy) Christian Colombo	Am	1, 3
(Indonesia) Garage 75	Ferrari 296 GT3 Evo	Ferrari F163CE 3.0 L Turbo V6	75	(Indonesia) David Tjiptobiantoro	Am	1, 3
(Indonesia) Garage 75	Ferrari 296 GT3 Evo	Ferrari F163CE 3.0 L Turbo V6	75	(Japan) "Cold Max"	Am	4
(Indonesia) Garage 75	Ferrari 296 GT3 Evo	Ferrari F163CE 3.0 L Turbo V6	75	(Japan) "Yamatatsu"	Am	4
(Australia) AMAC Motorsport	Porsche 911 GT3 R (992.2)	Porsche M97/80 4.2 L Flat-6	51	(Australia) Andrew Macpherson	Am	All
(Australia) AMAC Motorsport	Porsche 911 GT3 R (992.2)	Porsche M97/80 4.2 L Flat-6	51	(Australia) William Ben Porter	Am	All
(Japan) LM corsa	Ferrari 296 GT3	Ferrari F163CE 3.0 L Turbo V6	60	(Japan) Ryo Ogawa	PA	3–4
(Japan) LM corsa	Ferrari 296 GT3	Ferrari F163CE 3.0 L Turbo V6	60	(Japan) Shigekazu Wakisaka	PA	3–4
(New Zealand) EBM	Porsche 911 GT3 R (992.2)	Porsche M97/80 4.2 L Flat-6	61	(Malaysia) Adrian D'Silva	SA	4
(New Zealand) EBM	Porsche 911 GT3 R (992.2)	Porsche M97/80 4.2 L Flat-6	61	(Italy) Enzo Trulli	SA	4
(Hong Kong) Craft-Bamboo Racing	Mercedes-AMG GT3 Evo	Mercedes-AMG M159 6.2 L V8	77	(China) Liang Jiatong	SA	All
(Hong Kong) Craft-Bamboo Racing	Mercedes-AMG GT3 Evo	Mercedes-AMG M159 6.2 L V8	77	(Canada) Dean Chen Yuhao	SA	1–2, 5
(Hong Kong) Craft-Bamboo Racing	Mercedes-AMG GT3 Evo	Mercedes-AMG M159 6.2 L V8	77	(Japan) Daisuke Yamawaki	SA	3–4
(Hong Kong) Craft-Bamboo Racing	Mercedes-AMG GT3 Evo	Mercedes-AMG M159 6.2 L V8	77	(Malaysia) Melvin Moh	SA	6
(Japan) Team 5ZIGEN	Nissan GT-R Nismo GT3	Nissan VR38DETT 3.8 L Turbo V6	500	(Japan) Takayuki Aoki	S	All
(Japan) Team 5ZIGEN	Nissan GT-R Nismo GT3	Nissan VR38DETT 3.8 L Turbo V6	500	(Japan) Atsushi Miyake	S	1, 3–6
(Japan) Team 5ZIGEN	Nissan GT-R Nismo GT3	Nissan VR38DETT 3.8 L Turbo V6	500	(Japan) Kimiya Sato	S	2

Icon	Class
Drivers
PA	Pro-Am Cup
S	Silver Cup
SA	Silver-Am Cup
Am	Am Cup
	GT Academy Entrant

== Race results ==
Bold indicates the overall winner. In the Pole Position column, bold indicates the driver who set the qualifying lap.

Round		Circuit	Pole position	Pro-Am winners	Silver winners	Silver-Am winners	Am winners
1	R1	(Malaysia) Sepang	(Hong Kong) No. 29 Absolute Racing	**(Hong Kong) No. 911 Absolute Racing**	(Hong Kong) No. 29 Absolute Racing	(Japan) No. 25 Porsche Centre Okazaki	(China) No. 22 Origine Motorsport
1	R1	(Malaysia) Sepang	**(Malaysia) Akash Nandy**	**(France) Alessandro Ghiretti** **(China) Huang Ruohan**	(Malaysia) Akash Nandy	(Japan) Tsubasa Kondo (Japan) Kiyoshi Uchiyama	(China) Liu Hangcheng (China) Wang Zhongwei
1	R2	(Malaysia) Sepang	(Hong Kong) No. 918 AAS by Absolute Racing	**(China) No. 4 Origine Motorsport**	(China) No. 96 Winhere Harmony Racing	(Japan) No. 10 GTO with KRC	(China) No. 8 Climax Racing
1	R2	(Malaysia) Sepang	**(Denmark) Bastian Buus** (Thailand) Vutthikorn Inthraphuvasak	**(China) Lu Wei** **(Belgium) Alessio Picariello**	(China) Deng Yi (Hong Kong) Liu Kai Shun	(Chinese Taipei) Brian Lee (Netherlands) Maxime Oosten	(Indonesia) Setiawan Santoso (China) Zhou Bihuang
2	R1	(Indonesia) Lombok	(Indonesia) No. 50 Garage 75	(Hong Kong) No. 15 Audi Sport Asia Team Phantom	**(Hong Kong) No. 16 FAW Audi Sport Asia Team Phantom**	(Hong Kong) No. 77 Craft-Bamboo Racing	(China) No. 22 Origine Motorsport
2	R1	(Indonesia) Lombok	**(Indonesia) Sean Gelael**	(New Zealand) Jaxon Evans (Indonesia) "Andrés Pato"	**(China) Cheng Congfu** **(China) Yu Kuai**	(Canada) Dean Chen Yuhao (China) Liang Jiatong	(China) Liu Hangcheng (China) Wang Zhongwei
2	R2	(Indonesia) Lombok	(China) No. 37 Phantom Global Racing	**(China) No. 37 Phantom Global Racing**	(Hong Kong) No. 29 Absolute Racing	(Hong Kong) No. 77 Craft-Bamboo Racing	(Australia) No. 51 AMAC Motorsport
2	R2	(Indonesia) Lombok	**(Netherlands) Loek Hartog** (China) Anthony Liu Xu	**(Netherlands) Loek Hartog** **(China) Anthony Liu Xu**	(Malaysia) Akash Nandy	(Canada) Dean Chen Yuhao (China) Liang Jiatong	(Australia) Andrew Macpherson (Australia) William Ben Porter
3	R1	(Japan) Fuji	(China) No. 96 Harmony Racing	(Japan) No. 60 LM corsa	**(China) No. 96 Harmony Racing**	(Japan) No. 10 GTO with KRC	(China) No. 22 Origine Motorsport
3	R1	(Japan) Fuji	**(China) Chen Weian** (Hong Kong) Liu Kai Shun	(Japan) Ryo Ogawa (Japan) Shigekazu Wakisaka	**(China) Chen Weian** **(Hong Kong) Liu Kaishun**	(Chinese Taipei) Brian Lee (Netherlands) Maxime Oosten	(China) Liu Hangcheng (China) Wang Zhongwei
3	R2	(Japan) Fuji	(China) No. 89 Team KRC	**(China) No. 11 Origine Motorsport**	(Japan) No. 500 Team 5ZIGEN	(Japan) No. 10 GTO with KRC	(China) No. 8 Climax Racing
3	R2	(Japan) Fuji	**(Germany) Max Hesse** (China) Ruan Cunfan	**(Germany) Laurin Heinrich** **(China) Lu Wei**	(Japan) Takayuki Aoki (Japan) Atsushi Miyake	(Chinese Taipei) Brian Lee (Netherlands) Maxime Oosten	(Indonesia) Setiawan Santoso (China) Zhou Bihuang
4	R1	(Japan) Okayama	(Hong Kong) No. 29 Absolute Racing	(China) No. 89 Team KRC	**(Hong Kong) No. 16 FAW Audi Sport Asia Team Phantom**	(Japan) No. 10 GTO with KRC	(China) No. 8 Climax Racing
4	R1	(Japan) Okayama	(Malaysia) Akash Nandy **(Thailand) Sandy Stuvik**	(China) Ruan Cunfan (United States) Neil Verhagen	**(China) Cheng Congfu** **(China) Yu Kuai**	(Chinese Taipei) Brian Lee (Netherlands) Maxime Oosten	(Indonesia) Setiawan Santoso (China) Zhou Bihuang
4	R2	(Japan) Okayama	(Hong Kong) No. 15 Audi Sport Asia Team Phantom	**(Hong Kong) No. 15 Audi Sport Asia Team Phantom**	(China) No. 96 Harmony Racing	(Japan) No. 10 GTO with KRC	(China) No. 22 Origine Motorsport
4	R2	(Japan) Okayama	**(New Zealand) Jaxon Evans** (Indonesia) "Andrés Pato"	**(New Zealand) Jaxon Evans** **(Indonesia) "Andrés Pato"**	(China) Chen Weian (Hong Kong) Liu Kaishun	(Chinese Taipei) Brian Lee (Netherlands) Maxime Oosten	(China) Liu Hangcheng (China) Wang Zhongwei
5	R1	(China) Beijing	(China) No. 96 Harmony Racing	(China) No. 37 Phantom Global Racing	**(Hong Kong) No. 96 Harmony Racing**	(Hong Kong) No. 77 Craft-Bamboo Racing	(China) No. 8 Climax Racing
5	R1	(China) Beijing	**(Hong Kong) Liu Kai Shun** (Japan) Takuro Shinohara	(Turkey) Ayhancan Güven (China) Anthony Liu Xu	**(Hong Kong) Liu Kai Shun** **(Japan) Takuro Shinohara**	(Canada) Dean Chen Yuhao (China) Liang Jiatong	(Indonesia) Setiawan Santoso (China) Zhou Bihuang
5	R2	(China) Beijing	(Hong Kong) No. 911 Absolute Racing	**(Hong Kong) No. 911 Absolute Racing**	(Hong Kong) No. 16 FAW Audi Sport Asia Team Phantom	(Japan) No. 10 GTO with KRC	(Australia) No. 51 AMAC Motorsport
5	R2	(China) Beijing	**(France) Alessandro Ghiretti** (China) Huang Ruohan	**(France) Alessandro Ghiretti** **(China) Huang Ruohan**	(China) Cheng Congfu (China) Yu Kuai	(Chinese Taipei) Brian Lee (Netherlands) Maxime Oosten	(Australia) Andrew Macpherson (Australia) William Ben Porter
6	R1	(China) Shanghai	(Hong Kong) No. 29 Absolute Racing	(China) No. 11 Origine Motorsport	**(China) No. 96 Harmony Racing**	(Hong Kong) No. 77 Craft-Bamboo Racing	(China) No. 8 Climax Racing
6	R1	(China) Shanghai	**(Malaysia) Akash Nandy**	(Germany) Laurin Heinrich (China) Lu Wei	**(China) Chen Weian** **(Hong Kong) Liu Kaishun**	(China) Liang Jiatong (Malaysia) Melvin Moh	(Indonesia) Setiawan Santoso (China) Zhou Bihuang
6	R2	(China) Shanghai	(China) No. 11 Origine Motorsport	**(China) No. 11 Origine Motorsport**	(Japan) No. 500 Team 5ZIGEN	(Japan) No. 10 GTO with KRC	(Malaysia) No. 20 HZO Fortis Racing by Absolute Racing
6	R2	(China) Shanghai	**(Germany) Laurin Heinrich** (China) Lu Wei	**(Germany) Laurin Heinrich** **(China) Lu Wei**	(Japan) Takayuki Aoki (Japan) Atsushi Miyake	(Chinese Taipei) Brian Lee (Netherlands) Maxime Oosten	(Malaysia) Aaron Lim Say Joon (Malaysia) Haziq Zairel Oh

== Championship standings ==
Scoring system

Championship points are awarded for the first ten positions in each race. Entries are required to complete 75% of the winning car's race distance in order to be classified and earn points. Individual drivers are required to participate for a minimum of 25 minutes in order to earn championship points in any race.

Position	**1st**	**2nd**	**3rd**	**4th**	**5th**	**6th**	**7th**	**8th**	**9th**	**10th**
Points	25	18	15	12	10	8	6	4	2	1

=== Drivers' championships ===
==== Overall ====
Pos.	Driver	Team	SEP (Malaysia)		MAN (Indonesia)		FUJ (Japan)		OKA (Japan)		BEI (China)		SHA (China)		Points
1	(China) Lu Wei	(China) Origine Motorsport	6	1	10	9	3	1	4	2	Ret	2	3	**1**	164
2	(France) Alessandro Ghiretti (China) Huang Ruohan	(Hong Kong) Absolute Racing	1	3	4	2	9	6	8	Ret	5	**1**	7	2	143
3	(Hong Kong) Liu Kai Shun	(Hong Kong) Harmony Racing	Ret	6	14	8	**1**	10	5	5	**1**	4	1	15	120
4	(China) Anthony Liu Xu	(China) Phantom Global Racing	5	2	18	**1**	10	2	12	4	4	14	4	5	118
5	(Germany) Laurin Heinrich	(China) Origine Motorsport					3	1	4	2			3	**1**	110
6	(China) Cheng Congfu (China) Yu Kuai	(Hong Kong) Audi Sport Asia Team Phantom	3	21	1	11	4	9	1	8	11	3	6	10	107
7	(Malaysia) Akash Nandy	(Hong Kong) Absolute Racing	**2**	10	8	4	8	17	**10**	Ret	3	5	2	12	83
8	(China) Ruan Cunfan	(China) Team KRC	11	4	15	5	7	**3**	3	15	12	7	8	4	80
9	(Japan) Takayuki Aoki	(Japan) Team 5ZIGEN	4	19	12	10	5	4	2	20	2	Ret	18	9	73
10	(Japan) Atsushi Miyake	(Japan) Team 5ZIGEN	4	19			5	4	2	20	2	Ret	18	9	72
11	(China) Chen Weian	(Hong Kong) Harmony Racing					**1**	10	5	5			1	15	71
12	(New Zealand) Jaxon Evans (Indonesia) "Andrés Pato"	(Hong Kong) Audi Sport Asia Team Phantom	7	16	2	3	Ret	11	9	**1**	Ret	15	11	DNS	66
13	(Netherlands) Loek Hartog	(China) Phantom Global Racing			18	**1**							4	5	65
13	(Netherlands) Loek Hartog	(China) Origine Motorsport									Ret	2			65
14	(France) Dorian Boccolacci	(China) Phantom Global Racing	5	2			10	2							47
15	(Belgium) Alessio Picariello	(China) Origine Motorsport	6	1	10	9									44
15	(Belgium) Alessio Picariello	(Hong Kong) Absolute Racing											13	6	44
16	(Chinese Taipei) Brian Lee (Netherlands) Maxime Oosten	(China) Team KRC	15	5	Ret	14	12	12	6	3	9	13	12	7	41
17	(China) Li Lichao (Finland) Elias Seppänen	(China) Climax Racing	10	9	6	21	23†	Ret	17	6	7	16	10	3	41
18	(China) Liang Jiatong	(Hong Kong) Craft-Bamboo Racing	13	14	5	6	14	15	14	13	6	17	5	8	40
19	(Japan) Takuro Shinohara	(China) Harmony Racing									**1**	4			37
20	(United States) Neil Verhagen	(China) Team KRC	11	4					3	15					27
21	(Japan) Ryo Ogawa (Japan) Shigekazu Wakisaka	(Japan) LM corsa					2	7	Ret	9					26
22	(Thailand) Sandy Stuvik	(Hong Kong) Absolute Racing							**10**	Ret	3	5			26
23	(Canada) Dean Chen Yuhao	(Hong Kong) Craft-Bamboo Racing	13	14	5	6					6	17			26
24	(Turkey) Ayhancan Güven	(China) Phantom Global Racing							12	4	4	14			24
25	(Germany) Max Hesse	(China) Team KRC					7	**3**							21
26	(Hong Kong) Adderly Fong	(Malaysia) 33R Harmony Racing	14	Ret	17	13	6	5							18
27	(New Zealand) Brendon Leitch (China) Song Jiajun	(Hong Kong) Harmony Racing	16	11	9	12	11	8	Ret	7	8	11	9	11	18
28	(Germany) Tim Tramnitz	(China) Team KRC											8	4	16
29	(Finland) Jesse Krohn	(China) Team KRC			15	5					12	7			16
30	(Indonesia) Sean Gelael	(Indonesia) Garage 75			**3**	Ret									15
31	(Malaysia) Melvin Moh	(Hong Kong) Craft-Bamboo Racing											5	8	14
32	(Japan) Tsubasa Kondo (Japan) Kiyoshi Uchiyama	(Japan) Porsche Center Okazaki	8	8	7	20	13	14	WD	WD					14
33	(China) Deng Yi	(Hong Kong) Harmony Racing	Ret	6	14	8									12
34	(Macau) Kevin Tse	(Hong Kong) Absolute Racing											13	6	8
34	(China) Li Kerong (Germany) Joel Sturm	(Hong Kong) Absolute Racing									15	6			8
35	(Indonesia) "Andy Tan" (Netherlands) Thierry Vermeulen	(Hong Kong) Absolute Corse	9	7											8
35	(Indonesia) "Andy Tan" (Netherlands) Thierry Vermeulen	(Hong Kong) Absolute Racing					15	21							8
36	(Thailand) Vutthikorn Inthraphuvasak	(Hong Kong) Absolute Racing	12	**22**	11	7									6
36	(Denmark) Klaus Bachler	(Hong Kong) Absolute Racing			11	7			13	19					6
36	(Japan) Seiji Ara (Japan) Tomohide Yamaguchi	(Japan) Plus with BMW M Team Studie	17	17	13	17	16	22	7	11					6
37	(Australia) Andrew Macpherson (Australia) William Ben Porter	(Australia) AMAC Motorsport	20	20	20	16	22	24	19	18	Ret	8	17	17	4
38	(Japan) Hiroaki Nagai	(Japan) Porsche Center Okazaki	Ret	12	Ret	15	Ret	13	11	10	10	9	DNS	16	4
38	(Japan) Kazuto Kotaka	(Japan) Porsche Center Okazaki	Ret	12			Ret	13	11	10	10	9	DNS	16	4
39	(China) Liu Hangcheng (China) Wang Zhongwei	(China) Origine Motorsport	18	15	16	18	17	20	18	12	Ret	10	15	14	1
39	(Japan) Kimiya Sato	(Japan) Team 5ZIGEN			12	10									1
—	(Indonesia) Setiawan Santoso (China) Zhou Bihuang	(China) Climax Racing	21	13	19	19	19	18	15	14	13	12	14	18	0
—	(Denmark) Bastian Buus	(Hong Kong) Absolute Racing	12	**22**											0
—	(Japan) Daisuke Yamawaki	(Hong Kong) Craft-Bamboo Racing					14	15	14	13					0
—	(Malaysia) Aaron Lim Say Joon (Malaysia) Haziq Zairel Oh	(Malaysia) HZO Fortis Racing by Absolute Racing					21	23	Ret	Ret	14	Ret	16	13	0
—	(China) Sun Jingzu	(Malaysia) 33R Harmony Racing	14	Ret	17	13	WD	WD							0
—	(Japan) Kazuki Ota	(Hong Kong) Absolute Racing							13	19					0
—	(Japan) Yuichi Nakayama	(Japan) Porsche Centre Okazaki			Ret	15									0
—	(Japan) "Cold Max" (Japan) "Yamatatsu"	(Indonesia) Garage 75							16	16					0
—	(Malaysia) Adrian D'Silva (Italy) Enzo Trulli	(New Zealand) EBM							20	17					0
—	(Italy) Christian Colombo (Indonesia) David Tjiptobiantoro	(Indonesia) Garage 75	19	18			20	19							0
Guest drivers ineligible to score points
—	(Australia) Tom Sargent (United States) Kyle Washington	(Hong Kong) Absolute Corse					18	16							0
Pos.	Driver	Team	SEP (Malaysia)		MAN (Indonesia)		FUJ (Japan)		OKA (Japan)		BEI (China)		SHA (China)		Points

Colour	Result
Gold	Winner
Silver	Second place
Bronze	Third place
Green	Points classification
Blue	Non-points classification
Blue	Non-classified finish (NC)
Purple	Retired, not classified (Ret)
Red	Did not qualify (DNQ)
Red	Did not pre-qualify (DNPQ)
Black	Disqualified (DSQ)
White	Did not start (DNS)
White	Withdrew (WD)
White	Race cancelled (C)
Blank	Did not practice (DNP)
Blank	Did not arrive (DNA)
Blank	Excluded (EX)

**Bold** – Pole

Italics – Fastest Lap

Notes:

- † – Drivers did not finish the race, but were classified as they completed more than 90% of the race distance.

==== Pro-Am Cup ====
Pos.	Driver	Team	SEP (Malaysia)		MAN (Indonesia)		FUJ (Japan)		OKA (Japan)		BEI (China)		SHA (China)		Points
1	(China) Lu Wei	(China) Origine Motorsport	3	1	4	6	2	1	**2**	2	Ret	2	1	**1**	207
2	(France) Alessandro Ghiretti (China) Huang Ruohan	(Hong Kong) Absolute Racing	**1**	3	2	2	4	4	4	Ret	2	**1**	3	2	188
3	(China) Anthony Liu Xu	(China) Phantom Global Racing	2	2	**8**	**1**	**5**	2	7	3	**1**	7	**2**	4	175
4	(China) Ruan Cunfan	(China) Team KRC	6	4	7	4	3	**3**	1	8	5	4	4	3	146
5	(Germany) Laurin Heinrich	(China) Origine Motorsport					2	1	**2**	2			1	**1**	129
6	(New Zealand) Jaxon Evans (Indonesia) "Andrés Pato"	(Hong Kong) Audi Sport Asia Team Phantom	4	8	1	3	Ret	7	5	**1**	Ret	8	6	DNS	109
7	(New Zealand) Brendon Leitch (China) Song Jiajun	(Hong Kong) Harmony Racing	8	6	3	7	6	6	Ret	4	3	6	5	6	102
8	(Netherlands) Loek Hartog	(China) Phantom Global Racing			**8**	**1**							**2**	4	77
8	(Netherlands) Loek Hartog	(China) Origine Motorsport									Ret	2			77
9	(Belgium) Alessio Picariello	(China) Origine Motorsport	3	1	4	6									76
9	(Belgium) Alessio Picariello	(Hong Kong) Absolute Racing											7	5	76
10	(France) Dorian Boccolacci	(China) Phantom Global Racing	2	2			**5**	2							64
11	(Japan) Hiroaki Nagai	(Japan) Porsche Center Okazaki	Ret	7	Ret	8	Ret	8	6	6	4	5	DNS	7	58
12	(Japan) Kazuto Kotaka	(Japan) Porsche Center Okazaki	Ret	7			Ret	8	6	6	4	5	DNS	7	54
13	(Turkey) Ayhancan Güven	(China) Phantom Global Racing							7	3	**1**	7			52
14	(United States) Neil Verhagen	(China) Team KRC	6	4					1	8					49
15	(Japan) Ryo Ogawa (Japan) Shigekazu Wakisaka	(Japan) LM corsa					1	5	Ret	5					45
16	(Japan) Seiji Ara (Japan) Tomohide Yamaguchi	(Japan) Plus with BMW M Team Studie	9	9	6	9	8	10	3	7					40
17	(Finland) Jesse Krohn	(China) Team KRC			7	4					5	4			40
18	(Germany) Max Hesse	(China) Team KRC					3	**3**							30
19	(Indonesia) "Andy Tan" (Netherlands) Thierry Vermeulen	(Hong Kong) Absolute Corse	5	5											28
19	(Indonesia) "Andy Tan" (Netherlands) Thierry Vermeulen	(Hong Kong) Absolute Racing					7	9							28
20	(Germany) Tim Tramnitz	(China) Team KRC											4	3	27
21	(Thailand) Vutthikorn Inthraphuvasak	(Hong Kong) Absolute Racing	7	**10**	5	5									27
22	(Austria) Klaus Bachler	(Hong Kong) Absolute Racing			5	5			8	9					26
23	(China) Li Kerong (Germany) Joel Sturm	(Hong Kong) Absolute Racing									6	3			23
24	(Macau) Kevin Tse	(Hong Kong) Absolute Racing											7	5	16
25	(Denmark) Bastian Buus	(Hong Kong) Absolute Racing	7	**10**											7
26	(Japan) Kazuki Ota	(Hong Kong) Absolute Racing							8	9					6
27	(Japan) Yuichi Nakayama	(Japan) Porsche Center Okazaki			Ret	8									4
Pos.	Driver	Team	SEP (Malaysia)		MAN (Indonesia)		FUJ (Japan)		OKA (Japan)		BEI (China)		SHA (China)		Points

==== Silver Cup ====
Pos.	Driver	Team	SEP (Malaysia)		MAN (Indonesia)		FUJ (Japan)		OKA (Japan)		BEI (China)		SHA (China)		Points
1	(China) Cheng Congfu (China) Yu Kuai	(Hong Kong) Audi Sport Asia Team Phantom	2	4	1	4	2	3	1	**2**	4	1	3	2	213
2	(Hong Kong) Liu Kai Shun	(Hong Kong) Harmony Racing	Ret	1	5	**2**	**1**	4	3	1	**1**	2	1	4	210
3	(Japan) Takayuki Aoki	(Japan) Team 5ZIGEN	3	**3**	4	3	3	1	2	3	2	**Ret**	4	1	185
4	(Malaysia) Akash Nandy	(Hong Kong) Absolute Racing	**1**	2	3	1	5	5	**4**	Ret	3	3	**2**	**3**	178
5	(Japan) Atsushi Miyake	(Japan) Team 5ZIGEN	3	**3**			3	1	2	3	2	**Ret**	4	1	158
6	(China) Chen Weian	(Hong Kong) Harmony Racing					**1**	4	3	1			1	4	114
7	(China) Deng Yi	(Hong Kong) Harmony Racing	Ret	1	5	**2**									53
8	(Japan) Takuro Shinohara	(China) Harmony Racing									**1**	2			43
9	(Thailand) Sandy Stuvik	(Hong Kong) Absolute Racing							**4**	Ret	3	3			42
10	(Hong Kong) Adderly Fong	(Malaysia) 33R Harmony Racing					4	**2**							30
11	(Japan) Kimiya Sato	(Japan) Team 5ZIGEN			4	3									27
12	(Indonesia) Sean Gelael	(Indonesia) Garage 75			**2**	Ret									18
Pos.	Driver	Team	SEP (Malaysia)		MAN (Indonesia)		FUJ (Japan)		OKA (Japan)		BEI (China)		SHA (China)		Points

==== Silver-Am Cup ====
Pos.	Driver	Team	SEP (Malaysia)		MAN (Indonesia)		FUJ (Japan)		OKA (Japan)		BEI (China)		SHA (China)		Points
1	(Chinese Taipei) Brian Lee (Netherlands) Maxime Oosten	(China) Team KRC	5	**1**	Ret	3	1	1	1	**1**	3	1	3	2	223
2	(China) Liang Jiatong	(Hong Kong) Craft-Bamboo Racing	3	4	**1**	1	3	3	2	3	**1**	3	**1**	3	220
3	(China) Li Lichao (Finland) Elias Seppänen	(China) Climax Racing	2	3	2	5	**5**	Ret	**3**	2	2	2	2	**1**	185
4	(Canada) Dean Chen Yuhao	(Hong Kong) Craft-Bamboo Racing	3	4	**1**	1					**1**	3			117
5	(Japan) Tsubasa Kondo (Japan) Kiyoshi Uchiyama	(Japan) Porsche Center Okazaki	**1**	2	3	4	2	2	WD	WD					106
6	(Japan) Daisuke Yamawaki	(Hong Kong) Craft-Bamboo Racing					3	3	2	3					63
7	(Hong Kong) Adderly Fong (China) Sun Jingzu	(Malaysia) 33R Harmony Racing	4	Ret	4	**2**	WD	WD							42
8	(Malaysia) Melvin Moh	(Hong Kong) Craft-Bamboo Racing											**1**	3	40
9	(Malaysia) Adrian D'Silva (Italy) Enzo Trulli	(New Zealand) EBM							4	4					24
Guest drivers ineligible to score points
—	(Australia) Tom Sargent (United States) Kyle Washington	(Hong Kong) Absolute Corse					4	4							0
Pos.	Driver	Team	SEP (Malaysia)		MAN (Indonesia)		FUJ (Japan)		OKA (Japan)		BEI (China)		SHA (China)		Points

==== Am Cup ====
Pos.	Driver	Team	SEP (Malaysia)		MAN (Indonesia)		FUJ (Japan)		OKA (Japan)		BEI (China)		SHA (China)		Points
1	(Indonesia) Setiawan Santoso (China) Zhou Bihuang	(China) Climax Racing	4	**1**	2	3	2	**1**	1	2	1	3	1	4	233
2	(China) Liu Hangcheng (China) Wang Zhongwei	(China) Origine Motorsport	**1**	2	1	**2**	1	3	**3**	**1**	Ret	2	2	2	220
3	(Australia) Andrew Macpherson (Australia) William Ben Porter	(Australia) AMAC Motorsport	3	4	**3**	1	**5**	5	4	4	Ret	1	4	3	163
4	(Malaysia) Aaron Lim Say Joon (Malaysia) Haziq Zairel Oh	(Malaysia) HZO Fortis Racing by Absolute Racing					4	4	Ret	Ret	2	Ret	3	1	82
5	(Italy) Christian Colombo (Indonesia) David Tjiptobiantoro	(Indonesia) Garage 75	2	3			3	2							66
6	(Japan) "Cold Max" (Japan) "Yamatatsu"	(Indonesia) Garage 75							2	3					33
Pos.	Driver	Team	SEP (Malaysia)		MAN (Indonesia)		FUJ (Japan)		OKA (Japan)		BEI (China)		SHA (China)		Points

==== China Cup ====
Pos.	Driver	Team	SEP (Malaysia)		MAN (Indonesia)		FUJ (Japan)		OKA (Japan)		BEI (China)		SHA (China)		Points
1	(China) Cheng Congfu (China) Yu Kuai	(Hong Kong) Audi Sport Asia Team Phantom	1	4	1	3	2	2	1	2	2	1	2	1	242
2	(China) Liu Kai Shun	(Hong Kong) Harmony Racing	Ret	1	3	2	1	3	2	1			1	3	181
3	(China) Liu Hangcheng (China) Wang Zhongwei	(China) Origine Motorsport	4	3	4	5	4	4	3	3	Ret	2	3	2	154
4	(China) Chen Weian	(Hong Kong) Harmony Racing					1	3	2	1			1	3	123
5	(Canada) Dean Chen Yuhao (China) Liang Jiatong	(Hong Kong) Craft-Bamboo Racing	2	2	2	1					1	3			119
6	(Hong Kong) Adderly Fong	(Malaysia) 33R Harmony Racing	3	Ret	5	4	3	1							77
7	(China) Deng Yi	(Hong Kong) Harmony Racing	Ret	1	3	2									58
8	(China) Sun Jingzu	(Malaysia) 33R Harmony Racing	3	Ret	5	4	WD	WD							37
Pos.	Driver	Team	SEP (Malaysia)		MAN (Indonesia)		FUJ (Japan)		OKA (Japan)		BEI (China)		SHA (China)		Points

==== SRO GT Academy ====
Points are not awarded from race results, but results are included as provides some context. Points are awarded largely on the basis of single driver performance; average pace and fastest laps. The winner of the class will compete in 2027 Spa 24 Hours.

Pos.	Driver	Team	Points
1	(China) Yu Kuai	(Hong Kong) Audi Sport Asia Team Phantom	201
2	(Japan) Atsushi Miyake	(Japan) Team 5ZIGEN	171
3	(Netherlands) Maxime Oosten	(China) Team KRC	169
4	(Finland) Elias Seppänen	(China) Climax Racing	142
5	(Hong Kong) Liu Kai Shun	(Hong Kong) Harmony Racing	139
6	(Malaysia) Akash Nandy	(Hong Kong) Absolute Racing	112
7	(China) Deng Yi	(Hong Kong) Harmony Racing	60

=== Team championships ===
Pos.	Team	SEP (Malaysia)		MAN (Indonesia)		FUJ (Japan)		OKA (Japan)		BEI (China)		SHA (China)		Points
1	(Hong Kong) Absolute Racing	1	3	4	2	8	6	8	19	3	1	2	2	234
1	(Hong Kong) Absolute Racing	2	10	8	4	9	17	10	Ret	5	5	7	6	234
2	(Hong Kong) Audi Sport Asia Team Phantom	3	21	1	3	4	9	1	1	11	3	6	10	174
2	(Hong Kong) Audi Sport Asia Team Phantom	7	16	2	11	Ret	11	2	8	Ret	14	11	DNS	174
3	(China) Origine Motorsport	6	1	10	9	3	1	4	2	Ret	2	3	1	168
3	(China) Origine Motorsport	18	15	16	18	17	20	18	12	Ret	9	15	14	168
4	(China) Harmony Racing	16	6	9	8	1	8	5	5	1	4	1	11	141
4	(China) Harmony Racing	Ret	11	14	12	11	10	Ret	7	8	10	9	15	141
5	(China) Team KRC	11	4	15	5	7	3	3	3	9	6	8	4	123
5	(China) Team KRC	15	5	Ret	14	12	12	6	15	12	12	12	7	123
6	(China) Phantom Global Racing	5	2	18	1	10	2	12	4	4	13	4	5	118
7	(Japan) Team 5ZIGEN	4	19	12	10	5	4	2	20	2	Ret	18	9	74
8	(China) Climax Racing	10	9	6	19	19	18	15	6	7	11	10	3	41
8	(China) Climax Racing	21	13	19	21	23	Ret	17	14	14	15	14	18	41
9	(Hong Kong) Craft-Bamboo Racing	13	14	5	6	14	15	14	13	6	16	5	8	40
10	(Japan) LM corsa					2	7	Ret	9					26
11	(Japan) Porsche Center Okazaki	8	8	7	15	13	13	11	10	10	8	DNS	16	20
11	(Japan) Porsche Center Okazaki	Ret	12	Ret	20	Ret	14	WD	WD					20
12	(Malaysia) 33R Harmony Racing	14	Ret	17	13	6	5							18
13	(Indonesia) Garage 75	19	18	3	Ret	20	19	16	16					15
14	(Hong Kong) Absolute Corse	9	7			18	14							8
15	(Australia) AMAC Motorsport	20	20	20	19	22	24	19	18	Ret	7	17	17	6
16	(Japan) Plus with BMW M Team Studie	17	17	13	17	16	22	7	11					6
—	(Malaysia) HZO Fortis Racing by Absolute Racing					21	23	Ret	Ret	14	Ret	16	13	0
Pos.	Team	SEP (Malaysia)		MAN (Indonesia)		FUJ (Japan)		OKA (Japan)		BEI (China)		SHA (China)		Points

== See also ==
- 2026 British GT Championship
- 2026 GT World Challenge Europe
- 2026 GT World Challenge Europe Endurance Cup
- 2026 GT World Challenge Europe Sprint Cup
- 2026 GT World Challenge America
- 2026 GT World Challenge Australia
- 2026 Intercontinental GT Challenge
