= 2013 Japanese Formula 3 Championship =

Seasons
- ← 2012 2014 →

The 2013 Japanese Formula 3 Championship was the 35th edition of the Japanese Formula 3 Championship. It was the first Formula Three championship that accepted new FIA Formula 3 engine rules.

== Teams and drivers ==
All teams were Japanese-registered.

Team	Chassis	Engine	No.	Driver	Rounds
Championship Class
Toda Racing	Dallara F312	Toda TR-F301	2	(Japan) Tomoki Nojiri	All
HFDP Racing	Dallara F312	Mugen-Honda MF204D	7	(Japan) Nobuharu Matsushita	All
HFDP Racing	Dallara F312	Mugen-Honda MF204D	8	(Japan) Shota Kiyohara	All
B-Max Engineering	Dallara F312	Toda TR-F301	13	(Japan) Motoyoshi Yoshida	All
B-Max Engineering	Dallara F312	Toda TR-F301	50	(Japan) Katsumasa Chiyo	All
B-Max Engineering	Dallara F312	Toyota TOM'S 1AZ-FE	45	(Japan) Yuhi Sekiguchi	7
Petronas Team TOM'S	Dallara F312	Toyota TOM'S TAZ31	36	(Japan) Yuichi Nakayama	1–6
Petronas Team TOM'S	Dallara F312	Toyota TOM'S 1AZ-FE	36	(Japan) Yuichi Nakayama	7
Petronas Team TOM'S	Dallara F312	Toyota TOM'S TAZ31	37	(Japan) Takamoto Katsuta	All
National Class
Hanashima Racing	Dallara F306	Toyota TOM'S 3S-GE	6	(Japan) Hiroshi Koizumi	All
Team Nova with Nippon IMM	Dallara F306	Toyota TOM'S 3S-GE	11	(Japan) Shohei Yuzawa	All
KCMG	Dallara F308	Toyota TOM'S 3S-GE	19	(Japan) Ryosuke Takehira	2
NDDP Racing	Dallara F306	Toyota TOM'S 3S-GE	23	(Japan) Mitsunori Takaboshi	All
B-Max Engineering	Dallara F306	Toyota TOM'S 3S-GE	30	(Japan) "Dragon"	All
TOM'S Spirit	Dallara F306	Toyota TOM'S 3S-GE	38	(Thailand) Nanin Indra-Payoong	All
Tochigi Le Beausset Motorsports	Dallara F308	Toyota TOM'S 3S-GE	62	(Japan) Ryo Ogawa	3–5

== Race calendar and results ==
All rounds were held in Japan.

Round		Circuit	Date	Pole position	Fastest lap	Winning driver	Winning team	National winner
1	R1	Suzuka Circuit	13 April	(Japan) Yuichi Nakayama	(Japan) Yuichi Nakayama	(Japan) Takamoto Katsuta	Petronas Team TOM'S	(Japan) Mitsunori Takaboshi
1	R2	Suzuka Circuit	14 April	(Japan) Yuichi Nakayama	(Japan) Yuichi Nakayama	(Japan) Yuichi Nakayama	Petronas Team TOM'S	(Japan) Mitsunori Takaboshi
2	R1	Twin Ring Motegi	11 May	(Japan) Yuichi Nakayama	(Japan) Yuichi Nakayama	(Japan) Yuichi Nakayama	Petronas Team TOM'S	(Japan) Mitsunori Takaboshi
2	R2	Twin Ring Motegi	12 May	(Japan) Yuichi Nakayama	(Japan) Yuichi Nakayama	(Japan) Yuichi Nakayama	Petronas Team TOM'S	(Japan) Mitsunori Takaboshi
2	R3	Twin Ring Motegi	12 May		(Japan) Yuichi Nakayama	(Japan) Yuichi Nakayama	Petronas Team TOM'S	(Japan) Mitsunori Takaboshi
3	R1	Okayama International Circuit	29 June	(Japan) Takamoto Katsuta	(Japan) Takamoto Katsuta	(Japan) Yuichi Nakayama	Petronas Team TOM'S	(Japan) Mitsunori Takaboshi
3	R2	Okayama International Circuit	30 June	(Japan) Yuichi Nakayama	(Japan) Yuichi Nakayama	(Japan) Yuichi Nakayama	Petronas Team TOM'S	(Japan) Mitsunori Takaboshi
4	R1	Fuji Speedway	13 July	(Japan) Yuichi Nakayama	(Japan) Takamoto Katsuta	(Japan) Takamoto Katsuta	Petronas Team TOM'S	(Thailand) Nanin Indra-Payoong
4	R2	Fuji Speedway	14 July	(Japan) Yuichi Nakayama	(Japan) Yuichi Nakayama	(Japan) Yuichi Nakayama	Petronas Team TOM'S	(Japan) Mitsunori Takaboshi
5	R1	Twin Ring Motegi	3 August	(Japan) Yuichi Nakayama	(Japan) Yuichi Nakayama	(Japan) Yuichi Nakayama	Petronas Team TOM'S	(Japan) Mitsunori Takaboshi
5	R2	Twin Ring Motegi	4 August	(Japan) Yuichi Nakayama	(Japan) Yuichi Nakayama	(Japan) Yuichi Nakayama	Petronas Team TOM'S	(Thailand) Nanin Indra-Payoong
6	R1	Sportsland SUGO	28 September	(Japan) Yuichi Nakayama	(Japan) Yuichi Nakayama	(Japan) Yuichi Nakayama	Petronas Team TOM'S	(Japan) Mitsunori Takaboshi
6	R2	Sportsland SUGO	29 September	(Japan) Yuichi Nakayama	(Japan) Yuichi Nakayama	(Japan) Yuichi Nakayama	Petronas Team TOM'S	(Thailand) Nanin Indra-Payoong
7	R1	Fuji Speedway	19 October	(Japan) Katsumasa Chiyo	(Japan) Katsumasa Chiyo	(Japan) Katsumasa Chiyo	B-Max Engineering	(Thailand) Nanin Indra-Payoong
7	R2	Fuji Speedway	20 October	(Japan) Takamoto Katsuta	(Japan) Katsumasa Chiyo	(Japan) Katsumasa Chiyo	B-Max Engineering	(Japan) Mitsunori Takaboshi

== Championship standings ==
=== Drivers' Championships ===
- Points are awarded as follows:

1	2	3	4	5	6	PP	FL
10	7	5	3	2	1	**1**	1

==== Overall ====
Pos	Driver	SUZ		MOT			OKA		FUJ		MOT		SUG		FUJ		Points
1	(Japan) Yuichi Nakayama	**2**	**1**	**1**	**1**	1	1	**1**	**2**	**1**	**1**	**1**	**1**	**1**	WD	WD	146
2	(Japan) Takamoto Katsuta	1	2	2	2	2	**Ret**	2	1	2	6	6	Ret	DNS	3	**2**	80
3	(Japan) Katsumasa Chiyo	5	3	4	6	3	3	4	6	DSQ	2	2	2	4	**1**	1	72
4	(Japan) Tomoki Nojiri	6	6	3	4	6	2	3	3	6	3	3	Ret	2	6	4	50
5	(Japan) Nobuharu Matsushita	4	5	5	3	5	Ret	Ret	5	3	5	4	3	3	2	Ret	43
6	(Japan) Shota Kiyohara	3	4	6	5	4	4	5	4	4	4	5	4	5	4	6	39
7	(Japan) Mitsunori Takaboshi	7	7	7	7	7	5	6	8	5	7	8	5	7	8	5	9
8	(Japan) Yuhi Sekiguchi														5	3	7
9	(Thailand) Nanin Indra-Payoong	8	8	8	9	8	7	7	7	7	11	7	6	6	7	7	2
10	(Japan) Ryo Ogawa						6	DNS	10	DSQ	Ret	DNS					1
11	(Japan) Hiroshi Koizumi	Ret	9	10	10	10	10	DNS	9	8	Ret	9	7	8	9	8	0
12	(Japan) Shohei Yuzawa	Ret	10	11	12	11	8	8	13	9	10	10	8	Ret	12	10	0
13	(Japan) Motoyoshi Yoshida	Ret	12	Ret	13	13	Ret	9	11	11	8	12	9	Ret	11	11	0
14	(Japan) Ryosuke Takehira			9	8	9											0
15	(Japan) "Dragon"	9	11	12	11	12	9	Ret	12	10	9	11	Ret	9	10	9	0
Pos	Driver	SUZ		MOT			OKA		FUJ		MOT		SUG		FUJ		Points

Colour	Result
Gold	Winner
Silver	Second place
Bronze	Third place
Green	Points classification
Blue	Non-points classification
Blue	Non-classified finish (NC)
Purple	Retired, not classified (Ret)
Red	Did not qualify (DNQ)
Red	Did not pre-qualify (DNPQ)
Black	Disqualified (DSQ)
White	Did not start (DNS)
White	Withdrew (WD)
White	Race cancelled (C)
Blank	Did not practice (DNP)
Blank	Did not arrive (DNA)
Blank	Excluded (EX)

**Bold** – Pole
Italics – Fastest Lap

==== National Class ====
Pos	Driver	SUZ		MOT			OKA		FUJ		MOT		SUG		FUJ		Points
1	(Japan) Mitsunori Takaboshi	**7**	**7**	**7**	**7**	7	**5**	**6**	8	**5**	**7**	**8**	**5**	**7**	**8**	**5**	163
2	(Thailand) Nanin Indra-Payoong	8	8	8	9	8	7	7	**7**	7	11	7	6	6	7	7	113
3	(Japan) Hiroshi Koizumi	Ret	9	10	10	10	10	DNS	9	8	Ret	9	7	8	9	8	50
4	(Japan) "Dragon"	9	11	12	11	12	9	Ret	12	10	9	11	Ret	9	10	9	35
5	(Japan) Shohei Yuzawa	Ret	10	11	12	11	8	8	13	9	10	10	8	Ret	12	10	35
6	(Japan) Ryosuke Takehira			9	8	9											17
7	(Japan) Ryo Ogawa						6	DNS	10	DSQ	Ret	DNS					10
Pos	Driver	SUZ		MOT			OKA		FUJ		MOT		SUG		FUJ		Points

=== Teams' Championship ===
- Points are awarded as follows:

1	2	3	4	5	6
10	7	5	3	2	1

Pos	Team	SUZ		MOT			OKA		FUJ		MOT		SUG		FUJ		Points
1	Petronas Team TOM'S	1	1	1	1	1	1	1	1	1	1	1	1	1	3	2	142
2	B-Max Engineering	5	3	4	6	3	3	4	6	10	2	2	2	4	1	1	69
3	HFDP Racing	3	4	5	3	4	4	5	4	3	4	4	3	3	2	6	55
4	Toda Racing	6	6	3	4	6	2	3	3	6	3	3	Ret	2	6	4	50
5	NDDP Racing	7	7	7	7	7	5	6	8	5	7	8	5	7	8	5	9
6	TOM'S Spirit	8	8	8	9	8	7	7	7	7	11	7	6	6	7	7	2
7	Tochigi Le Beausset Motorsports						6	DNS	10	DSQ	Ret	DNS					1
NC	Hanashima Racing	Ret	9	10	10	10	10	DNS	9	8	Ret	9	7	8	9	8	0
NC	Team Nova with Nippon IMM	Ret	10	11	12	11	8	8	13	9	10	10	8	Ret	12	10	0
NC	KCMG			9	8	9											0
Pos	Team	SUZ		MOT			OKA		FUJ		MOT		SUG		FUJ		Points

=== Engine Tuners' Championship ===
Pos	Tuner	SUZ		MOT			OKA		FUJ		MOT		SUG		FUJ		Points
1	TOM'S	1	1	1	1	1	1	1	1	1	1	1	1	1	3	2	142
2	Toda Racing	5	3	3	4	3	2	3	3	6	2	2	2	2	1	1	86
3	M-TEC	3	4	5	3	4	4	5	4	3	4	4	3	3	2	6	55
Pos	Tuner	SUZ		MOT			OKA		FUJ		MOT		SUG		FUJ		Points
