= Real Racing (racing team) =

Japanese racing team

Real Co., Ltd.
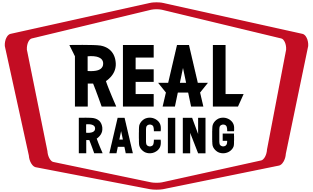
- Founded: 2007
- Base: Suzuka, Mie Prefecture, Japan
- Team principal(s): Katsutomo Kaneishi
- Current series: Super GT
- Former series: Super Formula; Japanese Formula 3 Championship
- Current drivers: Koudai Tsukakoshi; Yuto Nomura
- Teams' Championships: Japanese F3: 2 (N-Class: 2009, 2010)
- Drivers' Championships: Japanese F3: 3 (C-Class: 2014; N-Class: 2009, 2010)
- Website: www.real-racing.jp

Real Co., Ltd., better known as Real Racing, is a Japanese company headed by former racing driver Katsutomo Kaneishi.

== History ==
In 2007 Katsutomo Kaneishi had a tie-up with the Japanese version of Rolling Stone to launch Real Racing. The team name originates from their policy of "delivering real motorsports activities and fun to as many people as possible." Hiroshi Tanaka, former representative of Heroes Racing, was invited to be the manager. In its debut season in 2007, the team participated in the Japanese Formula 3 Championship and Super GT's GT500 class. In 2009, the Japanese F3 team began racing under the team name HFDP Racing as part of the Honda Formula Dream Project, Honda's young driver development project, and the team also started participating in Formula Nippon with the same name (Real Racing Team was launched in 2011). From that season onwards, Katsutomo Kaneishi has devoted himself to being the manager

=== Super Formula ===
Real Racing competed in Formula Nippon under the HFDP Racing banner in 2009 and 2010 with Koudai Tsukakoshi as the driver. In 2011, the team made their debut as Real Racing, fielding cars for Takashi Kobayashi and Hideki Mutoh. For the following season their drivers were Yuhki Nakayama and Toshihiro Kaneishi, the cousin of Katsutomo Kaneishi. Tsukakoshi returned to the team in 2013 in place of Kaneishi, and in 2014 former Italian Formula One driver Vitantonio Liuzzi took over Nakayama's seat and raced with the team for a single season. Takuya Izawa replaced Liuzzi for the 2015 and 2016 seasons, with Tsukakoshi maintaining the other seat. The team opted to race with one car from 2017 to 2019. They only fielded Tsukakoshi during these seasons, except in 2019 when Tristan Charpentier was supposed to race the full season, but got axed after the first round, with Tsukakoshi returning to the team to complete the remaining rounds of the season. In 2020, Real Racing announced it was withdrawing from the 2020 season.

=== Super GT – GT500 ===
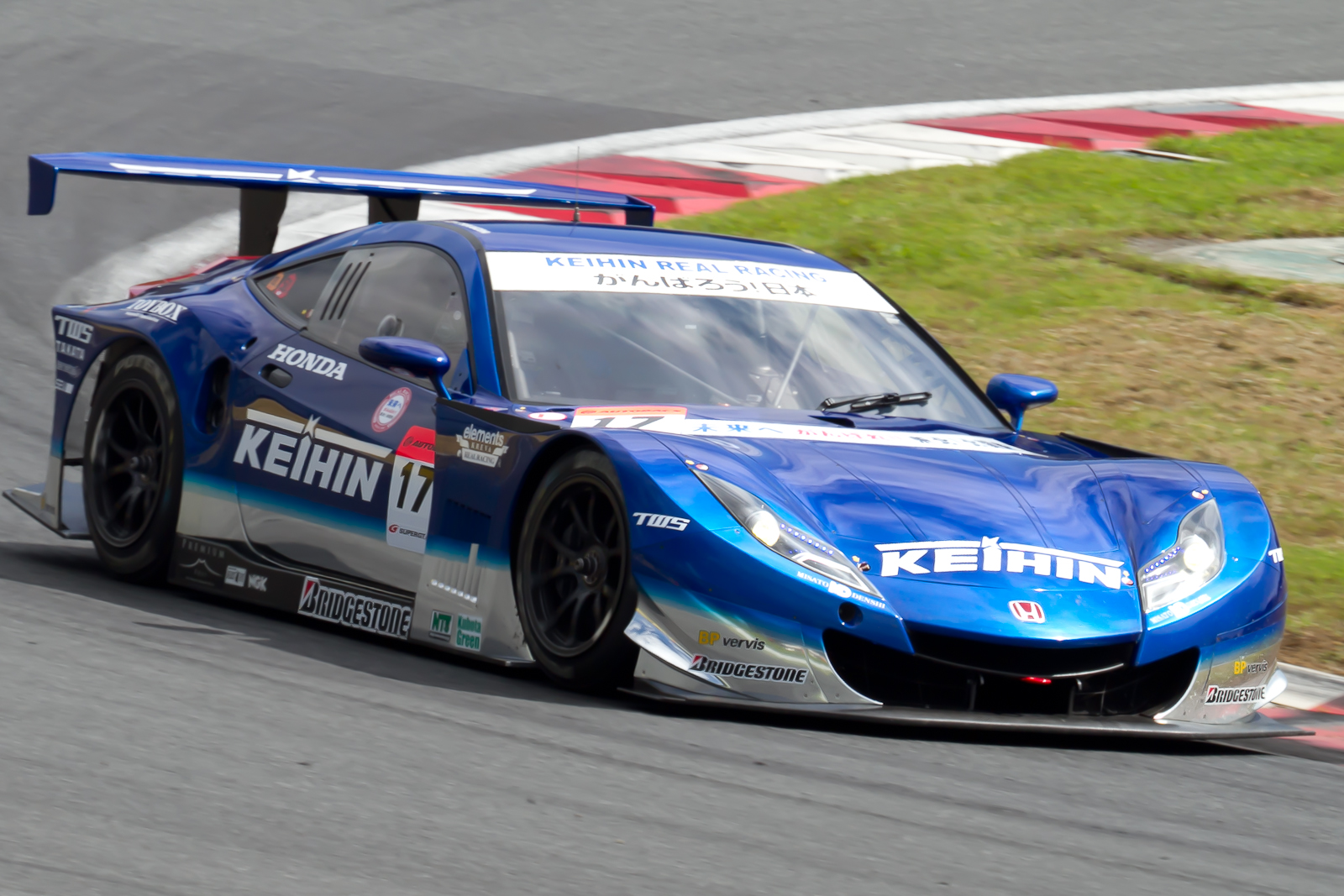
The Honda HSV-010 GT of Real Racing in 2011

In 2007, Real Racing competed in the GT500 with Honda as their choice of car manufacturer. Kaneishi himself took the wheel as an owner-driver along with his cousin Toshihiro Kaneishi. The F3 engine and Super GT vehicle were both manufactured by Honda, while the tyres came from Bridgestone. The team maintained its F3 cars in-house, although Super GT maintenance was outsourced from ARTA. In 2009, Keihin became the title sponsor of the team in Super GT, a role which it held until the end of the 2020 season. Keihin merged with a number of other companies to form Astemo, a joint venture between Hitachi and Honda at the time; as the result, Astemo replaced Keihin as the title sponsor for Real Racing in 2021. Nobuharu Matsushita rejoined Honda as a factory driver for 2022 and signed with Astemo Real Racing. He replaced Bertrand Baguette, who left Honda at the end of 2021. For 2024, Real Racing would have Kakunoshin Ohta as the replacement for Matsushita.

== Race results ==
=== Complete Super GT results ===
(key) (Races in bold indicate pole position) (Races in italics indicate fastest lap)

| Year | Car | Tyres | Class | No. | Drivers | 1 | 2 | 3 | 4 | 5 | 6 | 7 | 8 | 9 | 10 | Pos | Points |
|---|---|---|---|---|---|---|---|---|---|---|---|---|---|---|---|---|---|
| 2007 | Honda NSX | B | GT500 | 17 | (Japan) Katsutomo Kaneishi (Japan) Toshihiro Kaneishi (Japan) Takuya Izawa | SUZ; 6 | OKA; 10 | FUJ; Ret | SEP; 12 | SUG; Ret | SUZ; 5 | MOT; 7 | AUT; Ret | FUJ; 3 | | 13th | 41 |
| 2008 | Honda NSX | B | GT500 | 17 | (Japan) Katsutomo Kaneishi (Japan) Toshihiro Kaneishi (Japan) Koudai Tsukakoshi | SUZ; 8 | OKA; 16 | FUJ; 10 | SEP; 6 | SUG; 9 | SUZ; Ret | MOT; 15 | AUT; 11 | **FUJ**; 10 | | 15th | 30 |
| 2009 | Honda NSX | B | GT500 | 17 | (Japan) Toshihiro Kaneishi (Japan) Koudai Tsukakoshi (Japan) Katsutomo Kaneishi | OKA; 5 | SUZ; 6 | FUJ; 12 | SEP; 2 | SUG; 6 | SUZ; 10 | FUJ; 4 | AUT; Ret | MOT; 4 | | 5th | 72 |
| 2010 | Honda HSV-010 GT | B | GT500 | 17 | (Japan) Toshihiro Kaneishi (Japan) Koudai Tsukakoshi | SUZ; 7 | OKA; 7 | FUJ; 5 | SEP; 12 | SUG; 1 | SUZ; 4 | FUJ; C | MOT; 3 | NC1; 2 | NC2; 12 | 3rd | 72 |
| 2011 | Honda HSV-010 GT | B | GT500 | 17 | (Japan) Toshihiro Kaneishi (Japan) Koudai Tsukakoshi | OKA; 3 | FUJ; 8 | SEP; 3 | SUG; 6 | SUZ; 12 | FUJ; 3 | AUT; 6 | MOT; 7 | NC1; 11 | NC2; 3 | 4th | 71 |
| 2012 | Honda HSV-010 GT | B | GT500 | 17 | (Japan) Toshihiro Kaneishi (Japan) Koudai Tsukakoshi | OKA; 3 | FUJ; 6 | SEP; 7 | SUG; 9 | SUZ; 10 | FUJ; 5 | AUT; 14 | MOT; Ret | NC1; 2 | NC2; 15 | 11th | 47 |
| 2013 | Honda HSV-010 GT | B | GT500 | 17 | (Japan) Toshihiro Kaneishi (Japan) Koudai Tsukakoshi | OKA; 2 | FUJ; Ret | SEP; 5 | SUG; Ret | SUZ; 7 | FUJ; 2 | AUT; 3 | MOT; 2 | NC1; 1 | NC2; 6 | 2nd | 85 |
| 2014 | Honda NSX-GT | B | GT500 | 17 | (Japan) Toshihiro Kaneishi (Japan) Koudai Tsukakoshi | OKA; 6 | FUJ; Ret | AUT; Ret | SUG; 3 | **FUJ**; 4 | SUZ; Ret | BUR; 12 | MOT; 15 | | | 12th | 34 |
| 2015 | Honda NSX-GT | B | GT500 | 17 | (Japan) Koudai Tsukakoshi (Japan) Hideki Mutoh | OKA; 12 | FUJ; 4 | CHA; 3 | FUJ; 8 | SUZ; Ret | SUG; 8 | AUT; 3 | MOT; 8 | | | 8th | 58 |
| 2016 | Honda NSX-GT | B | GT500 | 17 | (Japan) Koudai Tsukakoshi (Japan) Takashi Kogure | OKA; 11 | FUJ; 12 | SUG; 6 | FUJ; 2 | SUZ; 10 | CHA; 6 | MOT; Ret | MOT; 11 | | | 11th | 43 |
| 2017 | Honda NSX-GT | B | GT500 | 17 | (Japan) Koudai Tsukakoshi (Japan) Takashi Kogure | OKA; 11 | FUJ; 8 | AUT; 2 | SUG; Ret | FUJ; Ret | SUZ; 15 | CHA; 3 | MOT; 4 | | | 8th | 51 |
| 2018 | Honda NSX-GT | B | GT500 | 17 | (Japan) Koudai Tsukakoshi (Japan) Takashi Kogure | **OKA**; 1 | FUJ; 11 | SUZ; 11 | CHA; 7 | FUJ; 3 | SUG; 9 | AUT; 6 | MOT; 15 | | | 6th | 66 |
| 2019 | Honda NSX-GT | B | GT500 | 17 | (Japan) Koudai Tsukakoshi (Belgium) Bertrand Baguette | OKA; 14 | FUJ; 5 | SUZ; Ret | BUR; 13 | FUJ; Ret | **AUT**; 2 | **SUG**; 5 | MOT; 5 | NC1; 2 | NC2; 21 | 7th | 54 |
| 2020 | Honda NSX-GT | B | GT500 | 17 | (Japan) Koudai Tsukakoshi (Belgium) Bertrand Baguette | FUJ; Ret | FUJ; 1 | SUZ; 8 | MOT; 1 | FUJ; 10 | SUZ; 10 | MOT; 5 | FUJ; 4 | | | 3rd | 80 |
| 2021 | Honda NSX-GT | B | GT500 | 17 | (Japan) Koudai Tsukakoshi (Belgium) Bertrand Baguette | OKA; 5 | FUJ; 1 | MOT; 14 | SUZ; 7 | SUG; 3 | AUT; 8 | MOT; 4 | FUJ; Ret | | | 5th | 71 |
| 2022 | Honda NSX-GT | B | GT500 | 17 | (Japan) Koudai Tsukakoshi (Japan) Nobuharu Matsushita | OKA; 9 | FUJ; 9 | SUZ; 2 | FUJ; 10 | SUZ; 2 | SUG; 12 | AUT; 1 | MOT; 5 | | | 4th | 79.5 |
| 2023 | Honda NSX-GT | B | GT500 | 17 | (Japan) Koudai Tsukakoshi (Japan) Nobuharu Matsushita | OKA; 7 | FUJ; 3 | SUZ; 9 | FUJ; 7 | SUZ; 4 | SUG; DSQ | AUT; 6 | MOT; 3 | | | 7th | 65 |
| 2024 | Honda Civic Type R-GT | B | GT500 | 17 | (Japan) Koudai Tsukakoshi (Japan) Kakunoshin Ohta | OKA; Ret | **FUJ**; 3 | SUZ; 6 | FUJ; 8 | SUG; 7 | AUT; Ret | MOT; 14† | SUZ; 2 | | | 10th | 54 |
| 2025 | Honda Civic Type R-GT | B | GT500 | 17 | (Japan) Koudai Tsukakoshi (Japan) Syun Koide | OKA; 8 | FUJ; 12 | SEP; 4 | FS1; 9 | FS2; 13 | SUZ; Ret | SUG; 3 | AUT; 8 | MOT; 13 | | 10th | 45 |

^{‡} Half points awarded as less than 75% of race distance was completed. * Season still in progress.

Note: Non-championship races (NC1, NC2) are major races that do not count towards the championship.
