= Rintaro Kubo =

Japanese racing driver (born 1993)

Rintaro Kubo 久保凜太郎
- Nationality: (Japan) Japanese
- Born: 18 September 1993 (age 33) Chiba Prefecture, Japan
- Categorisation: FIA Silver

Championship titles
- 2020 2020 2013: Super Taikyu – ST-4; Toyota Gazoo Racing GR86/BRZ Cup; Super FJ Motegi Series

Rintaro Kubo (久保 凜太郎, Kubo Rintarō; born 18 September 1993) is a Japanese racing driver who last competed in the GT300 class of Super GT for Pacific Racing Team.

A Super FJ champion in his early career, Kubo has been a mainstay in the Japanese sportscar scene since 2015, and a factory driver for Subaru since 2024. A podium finisher in Super GT's GT300 class, he was also Super Taikyu and TGR GR86/BRZ Cup champion in 2020, the first driver to do so in a Subaru BRZ.

== Career ==
Kubo made his single-seater debut in 2013, racing in the Super FJ Motegi Series, which he won after scoring three wins. During 2013, Kubo also made one-off appearances in the Super FJ Suzuka and Fuji Series, as well as Formula Challenge Japan for Le Beausset Racing Academy.

The following year, Kubo remained with Le Beausset Motorsports to step up to the Japanese Formula 3 Championship. Racing in the National class in his only season in the series, Kubo took five class wins en route to runner-up honors in the standings, 27 points behind Hiroshi Koizumi. Switching to sportscars for 2015, Kubo joined Team KTouch to race in Porsche Carrera Cup Japan, in which he scored a lone win at Suzuka, as well as eight other podiums to end the year third in points.

In 2016, Kubo made his debut in Super GT, as he joined Arnage Racing to compete in the GT300 class alongside Hideto Yasuoka. After scoring a best result of 12th at Fuji, Kubo returned to the series for the following year, as he switched to apr alongside Koki Saga. In his only season with the team, Kubo scored points at Okayama and Sugo, before taking his only podium of the year at Fuji en route to a 16th-place points finish. Continuing in Super GT for 2018, Kubo joined Pacific with Gulf Racing for his third season in the series, in which he scored a best result of sixth at Autopolis to end the year 17th in points.

Switching to Super Taikyu for 2019, Kubo joined C.S.I Racing to race in the ST-4 class alongside Shinya Hosokawa. In his first season in the series, Kubo scored a class win at Suzuka and two other podiums to help the team end the year third in points. Returning to Super GT for 2020, Kubo joined Tsuchiya Engineering-ran Max Racing alongside Atsushi Miyake, with whom he scored a best result of 13th at Fuji. In parallel, Kubo returned to Super Taikyu and C.S.I Racing, taking three class wins and one other podium to secure the ST-4 title at season's end. Kubo also raced in the Toyota Gazoo Racing GR86/BRZ Cup, in which he became the first driver in series history to win the title driving a Subaru BRZ.

Remaining with the team to continue in Super Taikyu the following year, Kubo mainly raced in the ST-Z class, scoring a lone win at Okayama as he helped the team end the year fifth in points. Kubo then primarily raced in the Toyota Gazoo Racing GR86/BRZ Cup the following year as he continued his affiliation with Subaru, as well as racing part-time in Super Taikyu for Tracy Sports, winning at Okayama and Suzuka in ST-3. Remaining in the former for 2023 with team Team Takuty, Kubo scored a lone win at Motegi and rounded out the season sixth in points. During 2023, Kubo also raced part-time in the Nürburgring Langstrecken-Serie for Team HAL.

Continuing in the Toyota Gazoo Racing GR86/BRZ Cup for Team Takuty in 2024, Kubo also raced with Subaru Tecnica International in select rounds of the Nürburgring Langstrecken-Serie, as well as the 24 Hours of Nürburgring. In parallel, Kubo raced with Porsche Team Ebi to race in the ST-Z class of Super Taikyu, taking a lone win at Suzuka and helping the team secure third in the ST-Z standings. The following year, Kubo remained with Team Takuty to once again race in the Toyota Gazoo Racing GR86/BRZ Cup, as well as continuing his part-time program with Subaru in the NLS and the 24 Hours of Nürburgring. Alongside that, Kubo remained with Porsche Team Ebi to continue racing in Super Taikyu in the ST-Z class. Kubo scored his first podium by finishing third at Suzuka, before following it up with a third-place finish at the Fuji 24 Hours and a second-place finish at the season-ending race at Fuji to end the year fifth in class.

For 2026, Kubo remained in the Toyota Gazoo Racing GR86/BRZ Cup with Team Takuty, as well as racing in the ST-Z class of Super Taikyu for Kokusai Group Sports Team. In addition, Kubo also remained with Subaru Tecnica International to race in the 24 Hours of Nürburgring, as well as select races in the GT300 class of Super GT for Pacific Racing Team.

== Karting record ==
=== Karting career summary ===
Season	Series	Team	Position
2009	CIK-FIA Asia-Pacific Championship — KF2	Sugiyama Racing	NC
2010	CIK-FIA Asia-Pacific Championship — KF2	Sugiyama Racing	17th
2010	Macau International Karting Grand Prix — SKF	Robot Racing	17th
2011	Karting World Championship — KF1	Sugiyama Racing	34th
2012	Karting World Championship — KF1	Sugiyama Racing	42nd

== Racing record ==
=== Racing career summary ===
Season	Series	Team	Races	Wins	Poles	F/Laps	Podiums	Points	Position
2013	Super FJ Motegi Series	Robot Tochigi Le Beausset PFC	6	3	1	0	6	82	**1st**
2013	Super FJ Suzuka Series	Robot Le Beausset Formula Academy	1	1	0	0	1	20	9th
2013	Super FJ Fuji Series		1		1		1		
2013	Formula Challenge Japan	Le Beausset Racing Academy	3	0	0	0	0	0	NC
2014	Japanese Formula 3 Championship – National	Tochigi Le Beausset Motorsports	15	5	7	5	10	97	**2nd**
2015	Porsche Carrera Cup Japan	Team KTouch Porsche	10	1	0	1	9	166	**3rd**
2016	Super GT – GT300	Arnage Racing	8	0	0	0	0	0	NC
2017	Super GT – GT300	apr	8	0	0	0	1	17	16th
2018	Super GT – GT300	Pacific with Gulf Racing	8	0	0	0	0	5	17th
2019	Super Taikyu – ST-4	C.S.I Racing	6	1	0	1	3	90.5‡	**3rd‡**
2020	Super GT – GT300	Max Racing	7	0	0	0	0	0	NC
2020	TGR GR86/BRZ Cup								**1st**
2020	Super Taikyu – ST-4	C.S.I Racing	5	3	4	3	4	129‡	**1st‡**
2021	Super Taikyu – ST-Z	C.S.I Racing	4	1	3	0	2	73.5‡	5th‡
2021	Super Taikyu – ST-4	C.S.I Racing	1	0	0	1	1	129.5‡	**2nd‡**
2022	TGR GR86/BRZ Cup	Recaro Racing Team	3	0	0	0	0	1	24th
2022	TGR GR86/BRZ Cup	Team Takuty	3	0	0	0	0	1	24th
2022	Super Taikyu – ST-1	Tracy Sports	1	0	0	0	0	128‡	**3rd‡**
2022	Super Taikyu – ST-3	Tracy Sports	2	2	2	0	2	99‡	**3rd‡**
2023	TGR GR86/BRZ Cup	Team Takuty	7	1	0	0	1	36	6th
2023	Nürburgring Langstrecken-Serie – SP3	Team HAL	2	0	0	0	1	0	NC
2023	Nürburgring Langstrecken-Serie – VT2-R+4WD	Team HAL	1	0	0	0	0	0	NC
2024	TGR GR86/BRZ Cup	Team Takuty	8	0	0	0	0	11	16th
2024	Super Taikyu – ST-Z	Porsche Team EBI	7	1	0	0	1	82‡	**3rd‡**
2024	Nürburgring Langstrecken-Serie – SP4T	Subaru Tecnica International	2	1	0	0	2	0	NC
2024	24 Hours of Nürburgring – SP4T	Subaru Tecnica International	1	1	0	0	1	—N/a	**1st**
2025	Super Taikyu – ST-Z	Porsche Team EBI	6	0	0	0	3	76.5‡	5th‡
2025	TGR GR86/BRZ Cup	Team Takuty	6	0	0	0	0	19	11th
2025	Nürburgring Langstrecken-Serie – SP4T	Subaru Tecnica International	2	0	0	0	0	0	NC
2025	24 Hours of Nürburgring – SP4T	Subaru Tecnica International	1	0	0	0	1	—N/a	**2nd**
2026	Super Taikyu – ST-Z	Kokusai Group Sports Team						‡	‡
2026	TGR GR86/BRZ Cup	Team Takuty							
2026	Super GT – GT300	Pacific Racing Team	3	0	0	0	0	5	38th
2026	24 Hours of Nürburgring – SP4T	Subaru Tecnica International						—N/a	

^{†} As Kubo was a guest driver, he was ineligible for championship points.

^{‡} Team standings.

=== Complete Formula Challenge Japan results ===
(key) (Races in bold indicate pole position) (Races in italics indicate fastest lap)

Year	Team	1	2	3	4	5	6	7	8	9	10	11	12	DC	Pts
2013	Le Beausset Racing Academy	FUJ1; 1	FUJ1; 2	MOT; 1	MOT; 2	FUJ2; 1	FUJ2; 2	FUJ2; 3	FUJ3; 1	FUJ3; 2	SUZ; 1 Ret	SUZ; 2; 13	SUZ; 3; 10	NC	0

=== Complete Japanese Formula 3 results ===
(key) (Races in bold indicate pole position) (Races in italics indicate fastest lap)

Year	Team	Engine	Class	1	2	3	4	5	6	7	8	9	10	11	12	13	14	15	DC	Pts
2014	Tochigi Le Beausset Motorsports	Toyota	N	**SUZ**; **1**; 9	**SUZ**; **2**; 10	MOT; 1; 9	MOT; 2; 12	MOT; 3; 8	**OKA**; **1**; 10	OKA; 2; 13	**FUJ1**; **1**; 8	FUJ1; 2 Ret	MOT; 1; 10	**MOT**; **2**; 11	**SUG**; **1** Ret	**SUG**; **2**; 8	FUJ2; 1; 12	FUJ2; 2 Ret	**2nd**	**97**

=== Complete Super GT results ===
Year	Team	Car	Class	1	2	3	4	5	6	7	8	DC	Points
2016	Arnage Racing	Mercedes-Benz SLS AMG GT3	GT300	OKA; 18	FUJ; 12	SUG; Ret	FUJ; 16	SUZ; 16	CHA; 15	MOT; 26	MOT; 19	NC	0
2017	apr	Toyota Prius apr GT	GT300	OKA; 10	FUJ; 12	AUT; Ret	SUG; 10	FUJ; 3	SUZ; Ret	CHA; 11	MOT; 12	16th	17
2018	Pacific with Gulf Racing	Porsche 911 GT3 R	GT300	OKA; 16	FUJ1; 17	SUZ; 15	BUR; 16	FUJ2; 15	AUT; 6	SUG; 11	MOT; 12	17th	5
2020	Max Racing	Lexus RC F GT3	GT300	FUJ; 16	FUJ; 13	SUZ; 20	MOT; 26	FUJ; 19	SUZ; WD	MOT; 15	FUJ	NC	0
2026	Pacific Racing Team	BMW M4 GT3 Evo	GT300	OKA	FUJ; 22	FUJ	SUZ	SUG	AUT; 21	MOT; 11	MOT	38th	5
