= 2023 Toyota Gazoo Racing GR86/BRZ Cup =

Japanese motor racing season

The 2023 Bridgestone TOYOTA GAZOO Racing GR86/BRZ Cup was the eleventh running of the TGR GR86/BRZ Cup, a one-make motor racing championship for Toyota 86 and Subaru BRZ sports cars operated by Toyota Gazoo Racing. The championship featured a mix of Toyota factory drivers, independent professional drivers, and gentleman drivers, and commenced on 13 May at Sportsland SUGO and concluded on 26 November at Fuji Speedway.

Subaru factory driver Takuto Iguchi won his second series championship during the series finale at Fuji despite a first-lap collision with Takamitsu Matsui and Reimei Itō, clinching the title by four points over runner-up Yuui Tsutsumi and third-placed Tōgo Suganami.

== Teams and drivers ==
=== Professional Series ===
Manufacturer	Team	No.	Driver	Rounds
Toyota	Delta Motorsports	1	(Japan) Yūsuke Tomibayashi	2–7
Toyota	Delta Motorsports	504	(Japan) Yūsuke Tomibayashi	1
Toyota	KIM International	3	(Japan) Kengo Ichijou	5–7
Toyota	Mansaku Jidousya	5	(Japan) Takashi Inoue	All
Toyota	T by Two CABANA Racing	7	(Japan) Yuui Tsutsumi	All
Toyota	T by Two CABANA Racing	700	(Japan) Hikaru Jitōsho	All
Toyota	T by Two CABANA Racing	770	(Japan) Ryō Yamada	All
Toyota	KWR Motorsports	8	(Japan) Keiichi Watanabe	7
Toyota	OTG Motor Sports	10	(Japan) Tōgo Suganami	All
Toyota	OTG Motor Sports	60	(Japan) Ryo Ogawa	All
Toyota	OTG Motor Sports	70	(Japan) Naoki Hattori	All
Toyota	OTG Motor Sports	80	(Japan) Reimei Itō	All
Toyota	ASSO Motor Sports	11	(Japan) Juichi Wakisaka	All
Toyota	ASSO Motor Sports	112	(Japan) Tomoaki Ichimori	All
Toyota	Kobannyanneru	12	(Japan) Seiya Jin	1–5
Toyota	Kobannyanneru	12	(Japan) Tsubasa Mekaru	6–7
Toyota	Kobannyanneru	120	(Japan) Masaya Kohno	5–7
Toyota	K-one Racing team	17	(Japan) Kiyonori Imai	1–2
Toyota	K-one Racing team	17	(Japan) Shunji Okumoto	4–7
Toyota	K-one Racing team	32	(Japan) Kiyonori Imai	4–7
Toyota	Ibaraki Toyopet Racing Team	18	(Japan) Yūichi Nakayama	2, 4–7
Toyota	KMS Racing	31	(Japan) Takayuki Aoki	All
Toyota	Ogura Clutch with Revolution	34	(Japan) Masahiro Sasaki	All
Toyota	TEAM GMB	38	(Japan) Manabu Yamazaki	3
Toyota	Spread	38	(Japan) Shō Tsuboi	5, 7
Toyota	Spread	38	(Japan) Shinya Hosokawa	6
Toyota	Takashima Noboru	50	(Japan) Noboru Takashima	5
Toyota	Y's PRODUCE	55	(Japan) Yūki Kamakura	1, 3, 6–7
Toyota	Tochigi Toyota T2FACTORY	56	(Japan) Yoshiyuki Tsuruga	All
Toyota	Maruta Toshimasa	58	(Japan) Toshimasa Maruta	2
Toyota	Morikawa Motoo	76	(Japan) Motoo Morikawa	5–7
Toyota	DTEC Team MASTER ONE	97	(Japan) Tomoki Takahashi	1–5
Toyota	DTEC Team MASTER ONE	98	(Japan) Yūya Motojima	All
Toyota	RSS	114	(Japan) Miki Onaga	2, 4–7
Toyota	Netz Hyōgo Racing Team	121	(Japan) Naoya Gamou	All
Toyota	Netz Toyama Racing	123	(Japan) Takamitsu Matsui	1, 3, 5–7
Toyota	Saitama Toyopet Green Brave	160	(Japan) Hiroki Yoshida	All
Toyota	AVANTECH racingteam	186	(Japan) Takafumi Katsuki	6–7
Toyota	Nine with ARN Racing	199	(Japan) Hibiki Taira	1–4, 6–7
Toyota	Kobe Toyopet Motor Sports	225	(Japan) Miki Koyama	All
Toyota	KSM	293	(Japan) Daichi Okamoto	1, 3–7
Toyota	4MINUTES	340	(Japan) Atsushi Miyake	All
Toyota	Hojust Racing	501	(Japan) Takeshi Suehiro	5–6
Toyota	Team MEISHIN	550	(Japan) Shōtarō Munetou	1–2, 4–7
Toyota	SHIFT	556	(Japan) Ryōsuke Go	All
Toyota	M Planning	910	(Japan) Hiroyuki Saka	1, 3–7
Subaru	Atract/K	62	(Japan) Junpei Katoh	1–3, 5, 7
Subaru	Team Takuty	87	(Japan) Rintarō Kubo	All
Subaru	Team Takuty	88	(Japan) Takuto Iguchi	All
Subaru	Recaro Racing Team	909	(Japan) Takashi Kogure	All
	Source:			

== Race calendar and results ==
All races were held in Japan. The provisional calendar was announced on 25 November 2022. The sixth round at Suzuka was run in support of the Super Formula Championship, with other rounds being run alongside local racing events and Formula Beat races.

Round	Circuit	Date	Pole position	Fastest lap	Winning driver	Winning team
1	(Miyagi Prefecture) Sportsland SUGO, Murata	14 May	(Japan) Daichi Okamoto	(Japan) Daichi Okamoto	(Japan) Daichi Okamoto	KSM
2	(Ōita Prefecture) Autopolis, Hita	11 June	(Japan) Reimei Itō	(Japan) Yūya Motojima	(Japan) Takuto Iguchi	Team Takuty
3	(Tochigi Prefecture) Mobility Resort Motegi, Motegi	23 July	(Japan) Hiroki Yoshida	(Japan) Hiroki Yoshida	(Japan) Rintarō Kubo	Team Takuty
4	(Hokkaido) Tokachi International Speedway, Sarabetsu	20 August	(Japan) Hibiki Taira	(Japan) Daichi Okamoto	(Japan) Yuui Tsutsumi	T by Two CABANA Racing
5	(Okayama Prefecture) Okayama International Circuit, Mimasaka	10 September	(Japan) Tōgo Suganami	(Japan) Hiroki Yoshida	(Japan) Takamitsu Matsui	Netz Toyama Racing
6	(Mie Prefecture) Suzuka International Racing Course, Suzuka	29 October	(Japan) Tōgo Suganami	(Japan) Takuto Iguchi	(Japan) Tōgo Suganami	OTG Motor Sports
7	(Shizuoka Prefecture) Fuji Speedway, Oyama	26 November	(Japan) Reimei Itō	(Japan) Yuui Tsutsumi	(Japan) Yūichi Nakayama	Ibaraki Toyopet Racing Team

== Championship standings ==
=== Drivers' Championship ===
Points were awarded to the top ten classified finishers, with one point awarded for pole position and fastest lap respectively.

1	2	3	4	5	6	7	8	9	10	PP	FL
20	15	12	10	8	6	4	3	2	1	**1**	1

Pos.	Driver	SUG	AUT	MOT	TOK	OKA	SUZ	FUJ	Points
1	(Japan) Takuto Iguchi	3	1	3	6	4	4	Ret	71
2	(Japan) Yuui Tsutsumi	2	9	4	1	7	2	25	67
3	(Japan) Tōgo Suganami	6	13	7	8	**2**	**1**	8	53
4	(Japan) Daichi Okamoto	**1**		5	7	9	36	3	49
5	(Japan) Yūichi Nakayama		4		3	10	6	1	49
6	(Japan) Rintarō Kubo	16	12	1	9	6	7	7	36
7	(Japan) Hibiki Taira	7	2	Ret	**2**		32	10	36
8	(Japan) Yūya Motojima	13	31	2	4	11	10	9	29
9	(Japan) Hiroki Yoshida	10	7	**Ret**	5	5	9	28	26
10	(Japan) Masahiro Sasaki	4	10	8	Ret	12	13	4	24
11	(Japan) Naoya Gamou	8	20	12	Ret	13	3	6	21
12	(Japan) Takamitsu Matsui	20		13		1	11	Ret	20
13	(Japan) Yūsuke Tomibayashi	5	8	11	29	33	5	11	19
14	(Japan) Takayuki Aoki	11	11	Ret	18	18	17	2	15
15	(Japan) Tomoki Takahashi	15	3	9	10	Ret			15
16	(Japan) Reimei Itō	14	**6**	10	WD	8	8	**Ret**	15
17	(Japan) Juichi Wakisaka	12	5	6	Ret	Ret	27	17	14
18	(Japan) Ryō Ogawa	23	14	18	16	3	12	12	12
19	(Japan) Shō Tsuboi					16		5	8
20	(Japan) Hikaru Jitōsho	9	26	22	13	Ret	15	16	2
–	(Japan) Tomoaki Ichimori	21	22	15	11	21	20	21	0
–	(Japan) Shōtarō Munetou	26	15		12	32	Ret	35	0
–	(Japan) Kengo Ichijou					20	23	13	0
–	(Japan) Naoki Hattori	19	16	17	15	Ret	14	20	0
–	(Japan) Ryō Yamada	27	19	29	14	15	22	32	0
–	(Japan) Yoshiyuki Tsuruga	17	29	14	19	24	24	18	0
–	(Japan) Seiya Jin	18	18	20	26	14			0
–	(Japan) Ryōsuke Go	24	21	24	23	22	25	14	0
–	(Japan) Shunji Okumoto				21	27	19	15	0
–	(Japan) Takashi Kogure	22	27	19	17	19	16	24	0
–	(Japan) Junpei Katoh	28	23	16		WD		34	0
–	(Japan) Hiroyuki Saka	25		23	22	17	Ret	19	0
–	(Japan) Atsushi Miyake	30	17	25	20	30	35	22	0
–	(Japan) Takeshi Suehiro					Ret	18		0
–	(Japan) Miki Koyama	DNS	Ret	26	24	23	21	30	0
–	(Japan) Takashi Inoue	31	28	21	25	28	Ret	31	0
–	(Japan) Miki Onaga		24		27	26	29	23	0
–	(Japan) Masaya Kohno					25	30	37	0
–	(Japan) Toshimasa Maruta		25						0
–	(Japan) Takafumi Katsuki						33	26	0
–	(Japan) Shinya Hosokawa						26		0
–	(Japan) Tsubasa Mekaru						31	27	0
–	(Japan) Manabu Yamazaki			27					0
–	(Japan) Motoo Morikawa					29	28	29	0
–	(Japan) Yūki Kamakura	29		28			34	33	0
–	(Japan) Kiyonori Imai	32	30		28	34			0
–	(Japan) Noboru Takashima					31			0
–	(Japan) Keiichi Watanabe							36	0
Pos.	Driver	SUG	AUT	MOT	TOK	OKA	SUZ	FUJ	Points

Key
Colour	Result
Gold	Race winner
Silver	2nd place
Bronze	3rd place
Green	Points finish
Blue	Non-points finish
Blue	Non-classified finish (NC)
Purple	Did not finish (Ret)
Black	Disqualified (DSQ)
Black	Excluded (EX)
White	Did not start (DNS)
White	Race cancelled (C)
White	Withdrew (WD)
Blank	Did not participate

**Bold** – Pole
Italics – Fastest Lap
