= 2009 Japanese Formula 3 Championship =

Seasons
- ← 2008 2010 →

The 2009 Japanese Formula 3 Championship was the 31st edition of the Japanese Formula 3 Championship. It commenced on April 4, 2009 and ended on September 27.

Marcus Ericsson became the first Swedish champion, after a title battle which went down to the final round in Sportsland SUGO. Ericsson won with 112 points, beating his teammates Takuto Iguchi with 103 points, and Yuji Kunimoto with 97 points.

== Teams and drivers ==
All teams were Japanese-registered.

Team	No	Driver	Chassis (Note: All drivers competed in Dallara chassis; model listed.)	Engine	Rounds
Championship Class
Petronas Team TOM'S	1	(Sweden) Marcus Ericsson	F308	Toyota-TOM'S	All
Petronas Team TOM'S	36	(Japan) Takuto Iguchi	F308	Toyota-TOM'S	All
Petronas Team TOM'S	37	(Japan) Yuji Kunimoto	F308	Toyota-TOM'S	All
Toda Racing	2	(Italy) Kei Cozzolino	F308	Mugen-Honda	All
ThreeBond Racing	12	(Japan) Hironobu Yasuda	F309	Nismo Nissan	All
Now Motor Sport	33	(Japan) Yuki Iwasaki	F308	Toyota-TOM'S	All
Denso Team Le Beausset	62	(Japan) Koki Saga	F308	Toyota-TOM'S	All
National Class
Hanashima Racing	5	(Japan) Katsuaki Kubota	F306	Toyota-TOM'S	All
HFDP Racing	7	(Japan) Naoki Yamamoto	F307	Toyota-TOM'S	All
HFDP Racing	8	(Japan) Takashi Kobayashi	F307	Toyota-TOM'S	All
Aim Sports	18	(Japan) Yuhi Sekiguchi	F307/305	Toyota-TOM'S	1–7
Aim Sports	18	(Japan) Ryuji Yamamoto	F307/305	Toyota-TOM'S	8
Achievement by KCMG	19	(Japan) Yoshitaka Kuroda	F307	Toyota-TOM'S	All
Achievement by KCMG	20	(Switzerland) Alexandre Imperatori	F307	Toyota-TOM'S	All
Team Nova	22	(Japan) Katsumasa Chiyo	F306	Toyota-TOM'S	All
Team Nova	23	(Japan) Kimiya Sato	F306	Toyota-TOM'S	All
CMS Motor Sports Project	77	(Japan) Tatsuru Noro	F306	Toyota-TOM'S	1, 4, 6, 8
CMS Motor Sports Project	77	(Japan) Hiroshi Koizumi	F306	Toyota-TOM'S	2–3, 5, 7

== Race calendar and results ==
Round		Circuit	Date	Pole position	Fastest lap	Winning driver	Winning team	National Class winner
1	R1	Fuji Speedway	4 April	(Sweden) Marcus Ericsson	(Sweden) Marcus Ericsson	(Japan) Takuto Iguchi	Petronas Team TOM'S	(Japan) Yuhi Sekiguchi
1	R2	Fuji Speedway	5 April	(Japan) Takuto Iguchi	(Sweden) Marcus Ericsson	(Japan) Takuto Iguchi	Petronas Team TOM'S	(Japan) Yuhi Sekiguchi
2	R1	Okayama International Circuit	25 April	(Japan) Hironobu Yasuda	(Sweden) Marcus Ericsson	(Japan) Takuto Iguchi	Petronas Team TOM'S	(Japan) Yuhi Sekiguchi
2	R2	Okayama International Circuit	26 April	(Japan) Yuji Kunimoto	(Japan) Kimiya Sato	(Japan) Hironobu Yasuda	ThreeBond Racing	(Japan) Kimiya Sato
3	R1	Suzuka Circuit	16 May	(Switzerland) Alexandre Imperatori	(Japan) Yuji Kunimoto	(Sweden) Marcus Ericsson	Petronas Team TOM'S	(Switzerland) Alexandre Imperatori
3	R2	Suzuka Circuit	17 May	(Japan) Yuji Kunimoto	(Japan) Takuto Iguchi	(Japan) Yuji Kunimoto	Petronas Team TOM'S	(Japan) Naoki Yamamoto
4	R1	Fuji Speedway	27 June	(Japan) Yuji Kunimoto	(Sweden) Marcus Ericsson	(Japan) Yuji Kunimoto	Petronas Team TOM'S	(Japan) Naoki Yamamoto
4	R2	Fuji Speedway	28 June	(Sweden) Marcus Ericsson	(Japan) Yuji Kunimoto	(Sweden) Marcus Ericsson	Petronas Team TOM'S	(Japan) Kimiya Sato
5	R1	Suzuka Circuit	11 July	(Italy) Kei Cozzolino	(Sweden) Marcus Ericsson	(Japan) Yuji Kunimoto	Petronas Team TOM'S	(Switzerland) Alexandre Imperatori
5	R2	Suzuka Circuit	12 July	(Sweden) Marcus Ericsson	(Sweden) Marcus Ericsson	(Sweden) Marcus Ericsson	Petronas Team TOM'S	(Japan) Naoki Yamamoto
6	R1	Twin Ring Motegi	8 August	(Sweden) Marcus Ericsson	(Sweden) Marcus Ericsson	(Sweden) Marcus Ericsson	Petronas Team TOM'S	(Japan) Naoki Yamamoto
6	R2	Twin Ring Motegi	9 August	(Italy) Kei Cozzolino	(Italy) Kei Cozzolino	(Italy) Kei Cozzolino	Toda Racing	(Japan) Naoki Yamamoto
7	R1	Autopolis	29 August	(Japan) Takuto Iguchi	(Japan) Takuto Iguchi	(Japan) Takuto Iguchi	Petronas Team TOM'S	(Japan) Naoki Yamamoto
7	R2	Autopolis	30 August	(Japan) Takuto Iguchi	(Japan) Takuto Iguchi	(Japan) Takuto Iguchi	Petronas Team TOM'S	(Japan) Naoki Yamamoto
8	R1	Sportsland SUGO	26 September	(Japan) Yuji Kunimoto	(Sweden) Marcus Ericsson	(Japan) Yuji Kunimoto	Petronas Team TOM'S	(Japan) Kimiya Sato
8	R2	Sportsland SUGO	27 September	(Sweden) Marcus Ericsson	(Sweden) Marcus Ericsson	(Sweden) Marcus Ericsson	Petronas Team TOM'S	(Japan) Naoki Yamamoto

== Standings ==
=== Championship Class ===
- Points are awarded as follows:

1	2	3	4	5	6	PP	FL
10	7	5	3	2	1	**1**	1

Pos	Driver	FUJ		OKA		SUZ		FUJ		SUZ		MOT		AUT		SUG		Pts
1	(Sweden) Marcus Ericsson	**2**	3	10	10	1	2	2	**1**	5	**1**	**1**	5	2	6	2	**1**	112
2	(Japan) Takuto Iguchi	1	**1**	1	9	2	3	3	2	6	2	3	4	**1**	**1**	3	Ret	103
3	(Japan) Yuji Kunimoto	3	2	2	**8**	3	**1**	**1**	3	1	4	5	2	5	7	**1**	3	97
4	(Italy) Kei Cozzolino	4	4	4	4	5	5	5	Ret	**2**	5	2	**1**	4	3	4	4	66
5	(Japan) Hironobu Yasuda	7	16	**5**	1	4	4	Ret	4	3	Ret	4	3	6	2	5	2	53
6	(Japan) Koki Saga	5	5	11	14	Ret	6	4	5	4	3	6	6	3	4	6	12	30
7	(Japan) Yuki Iwasaki	6	6	9	2	DNQ	DNQ	6	14	7	6	7	7	7	5	7	11	18
National Class
	(Japan) Yuhi Sekiguchi	8	7	3	5	12	14	15	Ret	11	12	10	12	Ret	12			0
	(Japan) Kimiya Sato	11	9	7	3	7	11	10	6	10	8	12	10	9	13	8	8	0
	(Japan) Naoki Yamamoto	12	8	Ret	6	8	7	7	8	12	7	8	8	8	8	12	5	0
	(Switzerland) Alexandre Imperatori	14	10	8	15	**6**	9	8	13	8	11	9	9	12	9	9	13	0
	(Japan) Takashi Kobayashi	9	11	6	7	11	10	9	9	9	9	13	14	11	10	13	7	0
	(Japan) Katsumasa Chiyo	10	12	Ret	11	9	8	11	7	14	14	11	11	10	11	Ret	6	0
	(Japan) Yoshitaka Kuroda	13	13	12	13	10	12	12	10	13	10	14	13	13	14	10	10	0
	(Japan) Katsuaki Kubota	16	14	13	16	Ret	13	14	12	16	15	Ret	15	Ret	16	14	Ret	0
	(Japan) Ryuji Yamamoto															12	9	0
	(Japan) Hiroshi Koizumi			14	12	13	Ret			15	13			14	15			0
	(Japan) Tatsuru Noro	15	15					13	11			15	Ret			15	14	0
Pos	Driver	FUJ		OKA		SUZ		FUJ		SUZ		MOT		AUT		SUG		Pts

Colour	Result
Gold	Winner
Silver	Second place
Bronze	Third place
Green	Points classification
Blue	Non-points classification
Blue	Non-classified finish (NC)
Purple	Retired, not classified (Ret)
Red	Did not qualify (DNQ)
Red	Did not pre-qualify (DNPQ)
Black	Disqualified (DSQ)
White	Did not start (DNS)
White	Withdrew (WD)
White	Race cancelled (C)
Blank	Did not practice (DNP)
Blank	Did not arrive (DNA)
Blank	Excluded (EX)

**Bold** – Pole
Italics – Fastest Lap

==== Teams Standings ====
- Points are awarded for both races as follows:

1	2	3	4	5	6
10	7	5	3	2	1

Pos	Driver	FUJ		OKA		SUZ		FUJ		SUZ		MOT		AUT		SUG		Pts
1	Petronas Team TOM'S	1	1	1	4	1	1	1	1	1	1	1	2	1	1	1	1	150
2	Toda Racing	4	4	3	3	5	5	5	Ret	2	5	2	1	4	3	4	4	62
3	ThreeBond Racing	7	7	4	1	4	4	Ret	4	3	Ret	4	3	6	2	5	2	52
4	Denso Team Le Beausset	5	5	7	7	Ret	6	4	5	4	3	6	6	3	4	6	6	30
5	Now Motor Sport	6	6	5	2	DNQ	DNQ	6	6	7	6	7	7	7	5	7	5	18
Pos	Driver	FUJ		OKA		SUZ		FUJ		SUZ		MOT		AUT		SUG		Pts

==== Engine Tuners Standings ====
- Points are awarded for both races as follows:

1	2	3	4	5	6
10	7	5	3	2	1

Pos	Driver	FUJ		OKA		SUZ		FUJ		SUZ		MOT		AUT		SUG		Pts
1	Toyota-TOM'S	1	1	1	2	1	1	1	1	1	1	1	2	1	1	1	1	154
2	Mugen-Honda	4	4	3	3	5	5	5	Ret	2	5	2	1	4	3	4	4	62
3	Nismo Nissan	7	7	4	1	4	4	Ret	4	3	Ret	4	3	6	2	5	2	52
4	Toyota	5	5	7	7	Ret	6	4	5	4	3	6	6	3	4	6	6	30
Pos	Driver	FUJ		OKA		SUZ		FUJ		SUZ		MOT		AUT		SUG		Pts

=== National Class ===
1	2	3	4	5	6	PP	FL
10	7	5	3	2	1	**1**	1

Pos	Driver	FUJ		OKA		SUZ		FUJ		SUZ		MOT		AUT		SUG		Pts
1	(Japan) Naoki Yamamoto	5	2	Ret	3	3	1	1	3	**5**	**1**	**1**	1	**1**	**1**	4	**1**	121
2	(Japan) Kimiya Sato	4	3	**3**	1	2	5	4	1	3	2	5	3	2	6	**1**	4	89
3	(Switzerland) Alexandre Imperatori	7	4	4	8	**1**	**3**	**2**	**8**	1	5	2	2	5	2	2	7	75
4	(Japan) Takashi Kobayashi	2	5	2	4	6	4	3	4	2	3	6	7	4	3	6	3	62
5	(Japan) Yuhi Sekiguchi	**1**	**1**	1	**2**	7	8	9	Ret	4	6	3	**5**	Ret	5			57
6	(Japan) Katsumasa Chiyo	3	6	Ret	5	4	2	5	2	7	8	4	4	3	4	Ret	2	48
7	(Japan) Yoshitaka Kuroda	6	7	5	7	5	6	6	5	6	4	7	6	6	7	3	6	21
8	(Japan) Ryuji Yamamoto															5	5	4
9	(Japan) Katsuaki Kubota	9	8	6	9	Ret	7	8	7	9	9	Ret	8	Ret	9	7	Ret	1
10	(Japan) Tatsuru Noro	8	9					7	6			8	Ret			8	8	1
11	(Japan) Hiroshi Koizumi			7	6	8	Ret			8	7			7	8			1
Pos	Driver	FUJ		OKA		SUZ		FUJ		SUZ		MOT		AUT		SUG		Pts

Colour	Result
Gold	Winner
Silver	Second place
Bronze	Third place
Green	Points classification
Blue	Non-points classification
Blue	Non-classified finish (NC)
Purple	Retired, not classified (Ret)
Red	Did not qualify (DNQ)
Red	Did not pre-qualify (DNPQ)
Black	Disqualified (DSQ)
White	Did not start (DNS)
White	Withdrew (WD)
White	Race cancelled (C)
Blank	Did not practice (DNP)
Blank	Did not arrive (DNA)
Blank	Excluded (EX)

**Bold** – Pole
Italics – Fastest Lap

==== Teams Standings ====
- Points are awarded for both races as follows:

1	2	3	4	5	6
10	7	5	3	2	1

Pos	Driver	FUJ		OKA		SUZ		FUJ		SUZ		MOT		AUT		SUG		Pts
1	HFDP Racing	2	2	2	3	3	1	1	3	2	1	1	1	1	1	4	1	126
2	Team Nova	3	3	3	1	2	2	4	1	3	2	4	3	2	4	1	2	99
3	Achievement by KCMG	6	4	4	7	1	3	2	5	1	4	2	2	5	2	2	6	75
4	Aim Sports	1	1	1	2	7	8	9	Ret	4	6	3	5	Ret	5	5	5	54
5	CMS Motor Sports Project	8	9	7	6	8	Ret	7	6	8	7	8	Ret	7	8	8	8	2
6	Hanashima Racing	9	8	6	9	Ret	7	8	7	9	9	Ret	8	Ret	9	7	Ret	1
Pos	Driver	FUJ		OKA		SUZ		FUJ		SUZ		MOT		AUT		SUG		Pts
