= 2019 Super GT Series =

Motor racing competition

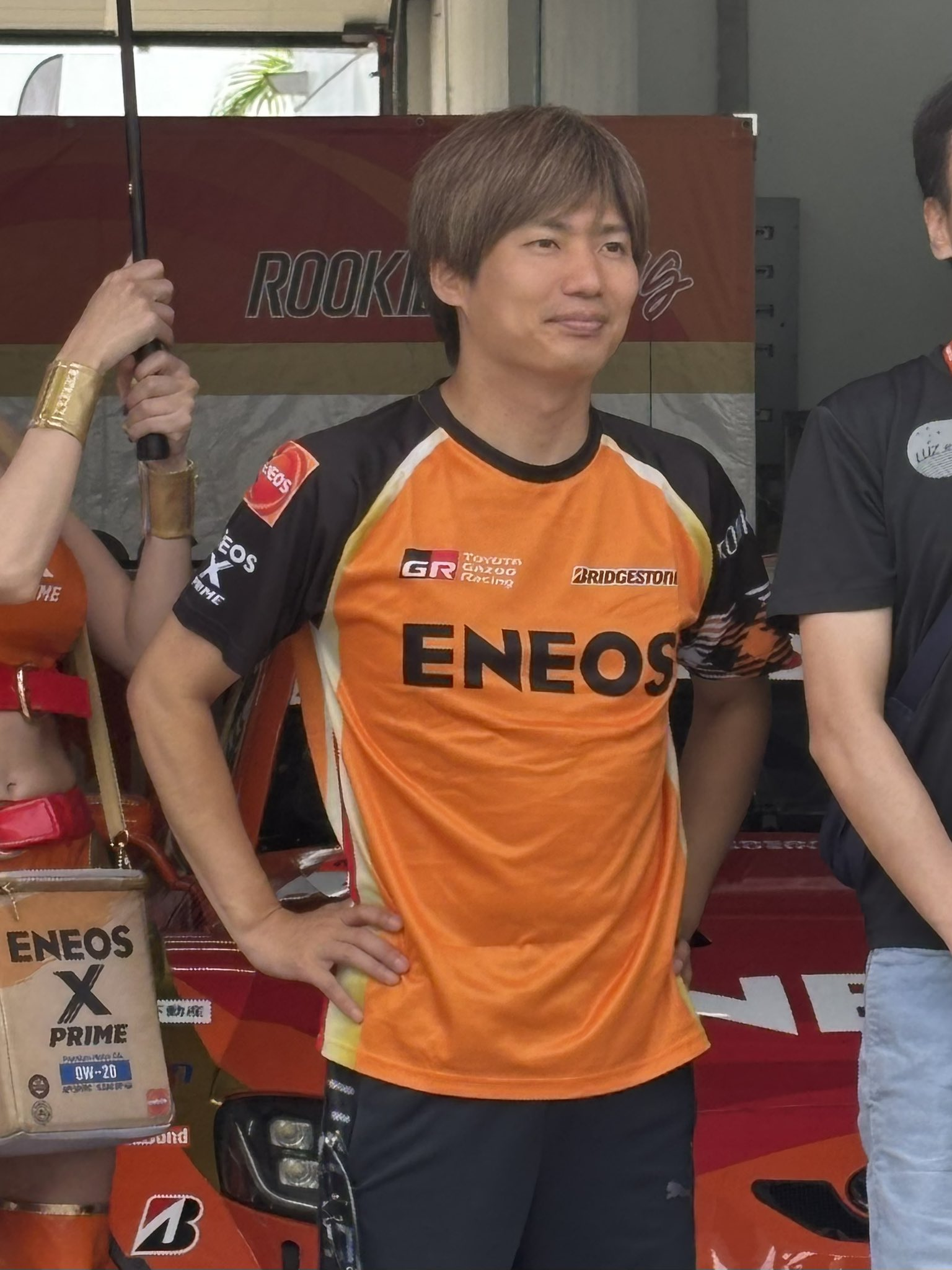
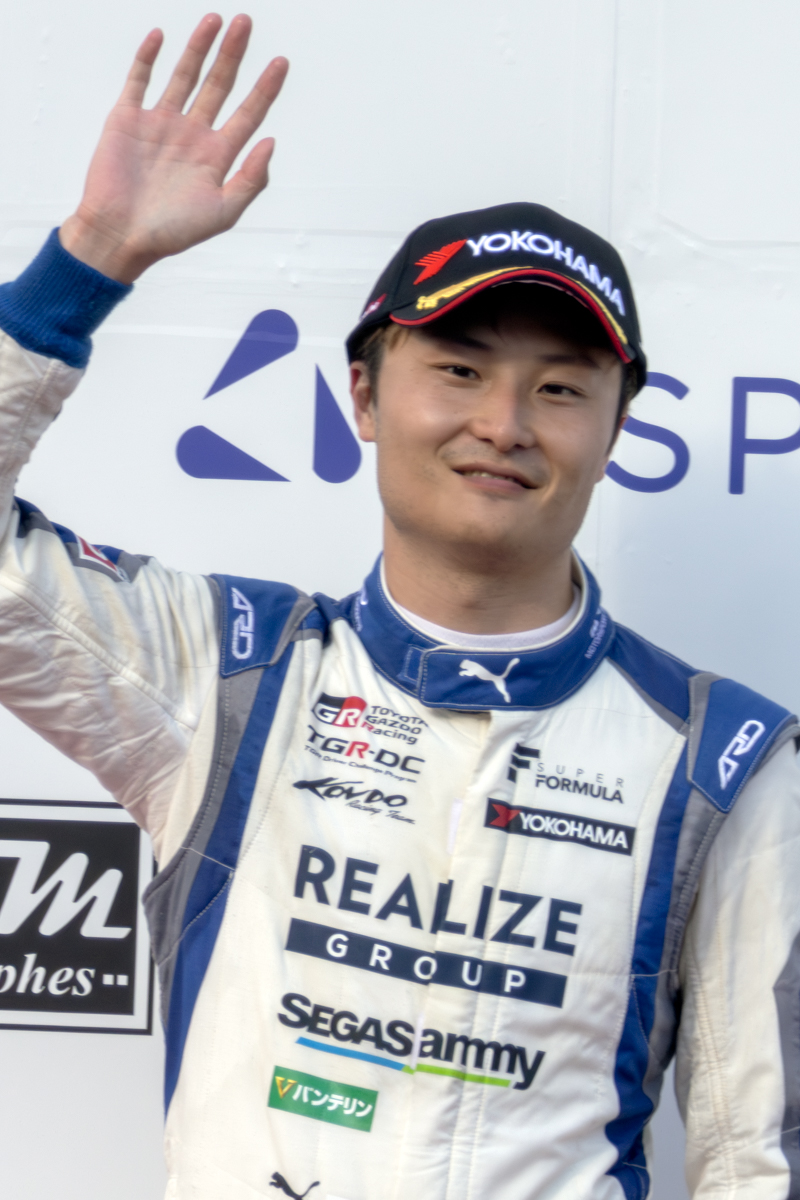
Kazuya Oshima and Kenta Yamashita (pictured in 2025 and 2024, respectively) won the GT500 Drivers Championship.

The 2019 Autobacs Super GT Series was a motor racing championship based in Japan for grand touring cars. The series is sanctioned by the Japan Automobile Federation (JAF) and run by the GT Association (GTA). It was the twenty-seventh season of the Japan Automobile Federation Super GT Championship which includes the All Japan Grand Touring Car Championship (JGTC) era and the fifteenth season the series has competed under the Super GT name. It was the thirty-seventh overall season of a national JAF sportscar championship dating back to the All Japan Sports Prototype Championship. The season began on April 14 and ended on November 24, after 8 championship races & 2 non-championship races.

As the culmination of a unified set of technical regulations adopted by Super GT and the Deutsche Tourenwagen Masters (DTM), the two series staged a joint-promotion race, the Super GT x DTM Dream Race at Fuji Speedway.

== Calendar ==
Round	Race	Circuit	Date
1	Okayama GT 300 km Race	(Japan) Okayama International Circuit	April 13–14
2	Fuji GT 500 km Race	(Japan) Fuji Speedway	May 3–4
3	Suzuka GT 300 km Race	(Japan) Suzuka Circuit	May 25–26
4	Chang Super GT Race	(Thailand) Chang International Circuit	June 29–30
5	Fuji GT 500 Mile Race	(Japan) Fuji Speedway	August 3–4
6	Autopolis GT 300 km Race	(Japan) Autopolis	September 7–8
7	Sugo GT 300 km Race	(Japan) Sportsland SUGO	September 21–22
8	Motegi GT 250 km Race	(Japan) Twin Ring Motegi	November 2–3
NC	Super GT × DTM Dream Race	(Japan) Fuji Speedway	November 23–24
NC	auto sport Web Sprint Cup	(Japan) Fuji Speedway	November 23–24

=== Calendar changes ===
- In light of the series' partnership with the Deutsche Tourenwagen Masters, two races featured entries from both Super GT and DTM. The first was the DTM season finale at the Hockenheimring, where one team from each GT500 manufacturer was invited to take part as a wildcard entry. The second event was the Super GT x DTM Dream Race at Fuji Speedway, featuring all GT500 teams and seven teams representing DTM manufacturers Audi and BMW. A balance of performance formula was applied to ensure parity between DTM and GT500 cars, as Super GT would not adopt Class One regulations in their entirety until 2020. And for both joint-promoted events, all teams used Hankook tyres.
- The auto sport Web Sprint Cup, a non-championship event for GT3 and GT300 competitors, was held at Fuji Speedway as a supporting event of the Super GT x DTM Dream Race.
- The Autopolis GT 300 km Race moved forward in the calendar to September 8, to the sixth round of the championship. The Sportsland Sugo round moved to the penultimate round of the season.
- The final round at Motegi was moved forward a week to avoid clashes with the FIA World Endurance Championship and Super Taikyu Series.

== Teams and drivers ==
=== GT500 ===
Team	Make	Car	Engine	No.	Drivers	Tyre	Rounds
(Belgium) BMW Team RBM	BMW	BMW M4 Turbo DTM	BMW P48 Turbo 2.0 L Turbo I4	00	(Japan) Kamui Kobayashi	HK	NC
(Belgium) BMW Team RBM	BMW	BMW M4 Turbo DTM	BMW P48 Turbo 2.0 L Turbo I4	4	(Italy) Alex Zanardi	HK	NC
(Belgium) BMW Team RBM	BMW	BMW M4 Turbo DTM	BMW P48 Turbo 2.0 L Turbo I4	11	(Germany) Marco Wittmann	HK	NC
(Japan) Team Kunimitsu	Honda	Honda NSX-GT GT500	Honda HR-417E 2.0 L Turbo I4	1	(Japan) Naoki Yamamoto	B	All, NC
(Japan) Team Kunimitsu	Honda	Honda NSX-GT GT500	Honda HR-417E 2.0 L Turbo I4	1	(United Kingdom) Jenson Button	B	All
(Japan) NDDP Racing with B-Max Racing	Nissan	Nissan GT-R NISMO GT500	Nissan NR20A 2.0 L Turbo I4	3	(France) Frederic Makowiecki	MI	All, NC1
(Japan) NDDP Racing with B-Max Racing	Nissan	Nissan GT-R NISMO GT500	Nissan NR20A 2.0 L Turbo I4	3	(Japan) Kohei Hirate	MI	All, NC2
(Japan) Lexus Team LeMans Wako's	Lexus	Lexus LC 500 GT500	Lexus RI4AG 2.0 L Turbo I4	6	(Japan) Kenta Yamashita	B	All, NC1
(Japan) Lexus Team LeMans Wako's	Lexus	Lexus LC 500 GT500	Lexus RI4AG 2.0 L Turbo I4	6	(Japan) Kazuya Oshima	B	All, NC2
(Japan) ARTA	Honda	Honda NSX-GT GT500	Honda HR-417E 2.0 L Turbo I4	8	(Japan) Takuya Izawa	B	All, NC1
(Japan) ARTA	Honda	Honda NSX-GT GT500	Honda HR-417E 2.0 L Turbo I4	8	(Japan) Tomoki Nojiri	B	All, NC2
(Japan) Team Impul	Nissan	Nissan GT-R NISMO GT500	Nissan NR20A 2.0 L Turbo I4	12	(Japan) Daiki Sasaki	B	All, NC2
(Japan) Team Impul	Nissan	Nissan GT-R NISMO GT500	Nissan NR20A 2.0 L Turbo I4	12	(United Kingdom) James Rossiter	B	1–5, 7–8, NC1
(Japan) Team Impul	Nissan	Nissan GT-R NISMO GT500	Nissan NR20A 2.0 L Turbo I4	12	(Japan) Katsumasa Chiyo	B	6
(Japan) Team Mugen	Honda	Honda NSX-GT GT500	Honda HR-417E 2.0 L Turbo I4	16	(Japan) Daisuke Nakajima	Y	All, NC1
(Japan) Team Mugen	Honda	Honda NSX-GT GT500	Honda HR-417E 2.0 L Turbo I4	16	(Japan) Hideki Mutoh	Y	All, NC2
(Japan) Keihin REAL Racing	Honda	Honda NSX-GT GT500	Honda HR-417E 2.0 L Turbo I4	17	(Japan) Koudai Tsukakoshi	B	All, NC
(Japan) Keihin REAL Racing	Honda	Honda NSX-GT GT500	Honda HR-417E 2.0 L Turbo I4	17	(Belgium) Bertrand Baguette	B	All
(Japan) Lexus Team WedsSport Bandoh	Lexus	Lexus LC 500 GT500	Lexus RI4AG 2.0 L Turbo I4	19	(Japan) Yuji Kunimoto	Y	All, NC2
(Japan) Lexus Team WedsSport Bandoh	Lexus	Lexus LC 500 GT500	Lexus RI4AG 2.0 L Turbo I4	19	(Japan) Shō Tsuboi	Y	All, NC1
(Japan) Audi Sport Team WRT Hitotsuyama	Audi	Audi RS5 Turbo DTM	Audi RC8 2.0 L Turbo I4	21	(France) Benoît Tréluyer	HK	NC
(Japan) NISMO	Nissan	Nissan GT-R NISMO GT500	Nissan NR20A 2.0 L Turbo I4	23	(Japan) Tsugio Matsuda	MI	All, NC1
(Japan) NISMO	Nissan	Nissan GT-R NISMO GT500	Nissan NR20A 2.0 L Turbo I4	23	(Italy) Ronnie Quintarelli	MI	All, NC2
(Japan) Kondo Racing	Nissan	Nissan GT-R NISMO GT500	Nissan NR20A 2.0 L Turbo I4	24	(Japan) Mitsunori Takaboshi	Y	All, NC2
(Japan) Kondo Racing	Nissan	Nissan GT-R NISMO GT500	Nissan NR20A 2.0 L Turbo I4	24	(United Kingdom) Jann Mardenborough	Y	All, NC1
(Germany) Audi Sport Team Phoenix	Audi	Audi RS5 Turbo DTM	Audi RC8 2.0 L Turbo I4	28	(France) Loïc Duval	HK	NC
(Germany) Audi Sport Team Rosberg	Audi	Audi RS5 Turbo DTM	Audi RC8 2.0 L Turbo I4	33	(Germany) René Rast	HK	NC
(Japan) Lexus Team au TOM'S	Lexus	Lexus LC 500 GT500	Lexus RI4AG 2.0 L Turbo I4	36	(Japan) Yuhi Sekiguchi	B	All, NC1
(Japan) Lexus Team au TOM'S	Lexus	Lexus LC 500 GT500	Lexus RI4AG 2.0 L Turbo I4	36	(Japan) Kazuki Nakajima	B	1, 3–8, NC2
(Japan) Lexus Team au TOM'S	Lexus	Lexus LC 500 GT500	Lexus RI4AG 2.0 L Turbo I4	36	(Japan) Ritomo Miyata	B	2
(Japan) Lexus Team KeePer TOM'S	Lexus	Lexus LC 500 GT500	Lexus RI4AG 2.0 L Turbo I4	37	(New Zealand) Nick Cassidy	B	All, NC1
(Japan) Lexus Team KeePer TOM'S	Lexus	Lexus LC 500 GT500	Lexus RI4AG 2.0 L Turbo I4	37	(Japan) Ryō Hirakawa	B	All, NC2
(Japan) Lexus Team ZENT Cerumo	Lexus	Lexus LC 500 GT500	Lexus RI4AG 2.0 L Turbo I4	38	(Japan) Yuji Tachikawa	B	All, NC1
(Japan) Lexus Team ZENT Cerumo	Lexus	Lexus LC 500 GT500	Lexus RI4AG 2.0 L Turbo I4	38	(Japan) Hiroaki Ishiura	B	All, NC2
(Japan) Lexus Team SARD	Lexus	Lexus LC 500 GT500	Lexus RI4AG 2.0 L Turbo I4	39	(Japan) Yuichi Nakayama	B	All, NC1
(Japan) Lexus Team SARD	Lexus	Lexus LC 500 GT500	Lexus RI4AG 2.0 L Turbo I4	39	(Finland) Heikki Kovalainen	B	All, NC2
(Japan) Modulo Nakajima Racing	Honda	Honda NSX-GT GT500	Honda HR-417E 2.0 L Turbo I4	64	(Japan) Tadasuke Makino	D	All, NC1
(Japan) Modulo Nakajima Racing	Honda	Honda NSX-GT GT500	Honda HR-417E 2.0 L Turbo I4	64	(India) Narain Karthikeyan	D	All, NC2
(Germany) Audi Sport Team Abt Sportsline	Audi	Audi RS5 Turbo DTM	Audi RC8 2.0 L Turbo I4	99	(Germany) Mike Rockenfeller	HK	NC

=== GT300 ===
Team	Make	Car	Engine	No.	Drivers	Tyre	Rounds
(Japan) Cars Tokai Dream28	Lotus	Lotus Evora MC	GTA V8 4.5 L V8	2	(Japan) Kazuho Takahashi	Y	All
(Japan) Cars Tokai Dream28	Lotus	Lotus Evora MC	GTA V8 4.5 L V8	2	(Japan) Hiroki Katoh	Y	All
(Japan) Cars Tokai Dream28	Lotus	Lotus Evora MC	GTA V8 4.5 L V8	2	(Japan) Hiroshi Hamaguchi	Y	5
(Japan) Goodsmile Racing with Team UKYO	Mercedes-AMG	Mercedes-AMG GT3	Mercedes-AMG M159 6.2 L V8	4	(Japan) Nobuteru Taniguchi	Y	All
(Japan) Goodsmile Racing with Team UKYO	Mercedes-AMG	Mercedes-AMG GT3	Mercedes-AMG M159 6.2 L V8	4	(Japan) Tatsuya Kataoka	Y	All
(Japan) Team Mach	Toyota	Toyota 86 MC	GTA V8 4.5 L V8	5	(Japan) Natsu Sakaguchi	Y	1–3, 5–8
(Japan) Team Mach	Toyota	Toyota 86 MC	GTA V8 4.5 L V8	5	(Japan) Yuya Hiraki	Y	1–3, 5–8
(Japan) Team Mach	Toyota	Toyota 86 MC	GTA V8 4.5 L V8	5	(Japan) Tetsuji Tamanaka	Y	2
(Japan) Team Mach	Toyota	Toyota 86 MC	GTA V8 4.5 L V8	5	(Japan) Ryōhei Sakaguchi	Y	5
(Japan) D'station Racing AMR	Aston Martin	Aston Martin Vantage AMR GT3	Aston Martin M177 4.0 L Twin Turbo V8	7	(Japan) Tomonobu Fujii	Y	All
(Japan) D'station Racing AMR	Aston Martin	Aston Martin Vantage AMR GT3	Aston Martin M177 4.0 L Twin Turbo V8	7	(Brazil) João Paulo de Oliveira	Y	All
(Japan) D'station Racing AMR	Aston Martin	Aston Martin Vantage AMR GT3	Aston Martin M177 4.0 L Twin Turbo V8	7	(United Kingdom) Darren Turner	Y	5
(Japan) Pacific Racing with Good Speed	Porsche	Porsche 911 GT3 R	Porsche M97/80 4.2 L F6	9	(Japan) Naoki Yokomizo	Y	All
(Japan) Pacific Racing with Good Speed	Porsche	Porsche 911 GT3 R	Porsche M97/80 4.2 L F6	9	(Japan) Kyosuke Mineo	Y	All
(Japan) Pacific Racing with Good Speed	Porsche	Porsche 911 GT3 R	Porsche M97/80 4.2 L F6	9	(Japan) Akihiro Tsuzuki	Y	5
(Japan) MP Racing	Nissan	Nissan GT-R Nismo GT3 (2017)	Nissan VR38DETT 3.8 L Twin Turbo V6	9	(Japan) "Joe Shindo"	Y	NC
(Japan) MP Racing	Nissan	Nissan GT-R Nismo GT3 (2017)	Nissan VR38DETT 3.8 L Twin Turbo V6	9	(Japan) Keiichi Inoue	Y	NC
(Japan) NILZZ Racing	Nissan	Nissan GT-R Nismo GT3 (2017)	Nissan VR38DETT 3.8 L Twin Turbo V6	48	(Japan) Masaki Tanaka	Y	1–3, 5–8, NC
(Japan) NILZZ Racing	Nissan	Nissan GT-R Nismo GT3 (2017)	Nissan VR38DETT 3.8 L Twin Turbo V6	48	(Japan) Taiyō Iida	Y	1–3, 5–8, NC
(Japan) NILZZ Racing	Nissan	Nissan GT-R Nismo GT3 (2017)	Nissan VR38DETT 3.8 L Twin Turbo V6	48	(Japan) Teruhiko Hamano	Y	2, 5
(Japan) GAINER	Nissan	Nissan GT-R Nismo GT3 (2018)	Nissan VR38DETT 3.8 L Twin Turbo V6	10	(Japan) Kazuki Hoshino	Y	All
(Japan) GAINER	Nissan	Nissan GT-R Nismo GT3 (2018)	Nissan VR38DETT 3.8 L Twin Turbo V6	10	(Japan) Keishi Ishikawa	Y	All
(Japan) GAINER	Nissan	Nissan GT-R Nismo GT3 (2018)	Nissan VR38DETT 3.8 L Twin Turbo V6	11	(Japan) Katsuyuki Hiranaka	D	All
(Japan) GAINER	Nissan	Nissan GT-R Nismo GT3 (2018)	Nissan VR38DETT 3.8 L Twin Turbo V6	11	(Japan) Hironobu Yasuda	D	All
(Finland) Hanashima Racing	McLaren	McLaren 720S GT3	McLaren M840T 4.0 L Twin Turbo V8	11	(Japan) Katsuaki Kubota	Y	NC
(Finland) Hanashima Racing	McLaren	McLaren 720S GT3	McLaren M840T 4.0 L Twin Turbo V8	11	(Japan) Kazuto Kotaka	Y	NC
(Japan) Team UpGarage (Note: Car No. 18 entered as Team UpGarage, car No. 55 entered as ARTA, and car No. 720 entered as McLaren Customer Racing Japan)	Honda	Honda NSX GT3 Evo	Honda JNC1 3.5 L Twin Turbo V6	18	(Japan) Takashi Kobayashi	Y	All
(Japan) Team UpGarage	Honda	Honda NSX GT3 Evo	Honda JNC1 3.5 L Twin Turbo V6	18	(Japan) Kosuke Matsuura	Y	All
(Japan) Team UpGarage	Honda	Honda NSX GT3 Evo	Honda JNC1 3.5 L Twin Turbo V6	18	(Japan) Shinnosuke Yamada	Y	2, 5
(Japan) ARTA	Honda	Honda NSX GT3 Evo	Honda JNC1 3.5 L Twin Turbo V6	55	(Japan) Shinichi Takagi	B	All
(Japan) ARTA	Honda	Honda NSX GT3 Evo	Honda JNC1 3.5 L Twin Turbo V6	55	(Japan) Nirei Fukuzumi	B	All
(Japan) Audi Team Hitotsuyama	Audi	Audi R8 LMS Evo	Audi DAR 5.2 L V10	21	(United Kingdom) Richard Lyons	Y	All
(Japan) Audi Team Hitotsuyama	Audi	Audi R8 LMS Evo	Audi DAR 5.2 L V10	21	(Japan) Ryuichiro Tomita	Y	All
(Japan) Audi Team Hitotsuyama	Audi	Audi R8 LMS Evo	Audi DAR 5.2 L V10	21	(Belgium) Alessio Picariello	Y	2, 5
(Japan) R'Qs Motor Sports	Mercedes-AMG	Mercedes-AMG GT3	Mercedes-AMG M159 6.2 L V8	22	(Japan) Hisashi Wada	Y	1–3, 5–6, 8
(Japan) R'Qs Motor Sports	Mercedes-AMG	Mercedes-AMG GT3	Mercedes-AMG M159 6.2 L V8	22	(Japan) Masaki Jyonai	Y	1–3, 5–6, 8
(Japan) R'Qs Motor Sports	Mercedes-AMG	Mercedes-AMG GT3	Mercedes-AMG M159 6.2 L V8	22	(Sweden) Björn Wirdheim	Y	5
(Japan) Arnage Racing	Mercedes-AMG	Mercedes-AMG GT3	Mercedes-AMG M159 6.2 L V8	50	(Japan) Masaki Kano	Y	All
(Japan) Arnage Racing	Mercedes-AMG	Mercedes-AMG GT3	Mercedes-AMG M159 6.2 L V8	50	(Japan) Ryōsei Yamashita	Y	All
(Japan) Arnage Racing	Mercedes-AMG	Mercedes-AMG GT3	Mercedes-AMG M159 6.2 L V8	50	(Japan) Yuya Tezuka	Y	2, 5
(Japan) / Tsuchiya Engineering (Note: Car No. 25 entered as Team Tsuchiya, and car No. 244 entered as Max Racing); (Japan) / Max Racing	Toyota	Toyota 86 MC	GTA V8 4.5 L V8	25	(Japan) Takamitsu Matsui	Y	All, NC
(Japan) / Tsuchiya Engineering; (Japan) / Max Racing	Toyota	Toyota 86 MC	GTA V8 4.5 L V8	25	(Japan) Kimiya Sato	Y	All, NC
(Japan) / Tsuchiya Engineering; (Japan) / Max Racing	Toyota	Toyota 86 MC	GTA V8 4.5 L V8	25	(Japan) Takeshi Tsuchiya	Y	2, 5
(Japan) / Tsuchiya Engineering; (Japan) / Max Racing	Lexus	Lexus RC F GT3	Lexus 2UR-GSE 5.4 L V8	244	(Japan) Takeshi Tsuchiya	Y	NC
(Japan) / Tsuchiya Engineering; (Japan) / Max Racing	Lexus	Lexus RC F GT3	Lexus 2UR-GSE 5.4 L V8	244	(Japan) "Go Max"	Y	NC
(Japan) apr	Toyota	Toyota GR Sport Prius PHV apr GT	Toyota 2UR-GSE 5.4 L V8	30	(Japan) Hiroaki Nagai	Y	All, NC
(Japan) apr	Toyota	Toyota GR Sport Prius PHV apr GT	Toyota 2UR-GSE 5.4 L V8	30	(Japan) Manabu Orido	Y	All, NC
(Japan) apr	Toyota	Toyota GR Sport Prius PHV apr GT	Toyota 2UR-GSE 5.4 L V8	30	(Japan) Kazuto Kotaka	Y	2, 5
(Japan) apr	Toyota	Toyota GR Sport Prius PHV apr GT	Toyota 2UR-GSE 5.4 L Hybrid V8	31	(Japan) Koki Saga	B	All, NC
(Japan) apr	Toyota	Toyota GR Sport Prius PHV apr GT	Toyota 2UR-GSE 5.4 L Hybrid V8	31	(Japan) Yuhki Nakayama	B	All, NC
(Hong Kong) X Works	Nissan	Nissan GT-R Nismo GT3 (2018)	Nissan VR38DETT 3.8 L Twin Turbo V6	33	(Hong Kong) Shaun Thong	Y	All
(Hong Kong) X Works	Nissan	Nissan GT-R Nismo GT3 (2018)	Nissan VR38DETT 3.8 L Twin Turbo V6	33	(Hong Kong) Marchy Lee	Y	1–5
(Hong Kong) X Works	Nissan	Nissan GT-R Nismo GT3 (2018)	Nissan VR38DETT 3.8 L Twin Turbo V6	33	(Japan) Shinya Michimi	Y	2, 5–8
(Japan) Modulo Drago Corse	Honda	Honda NSX GT3 Evo	Honda JNC1 3.5 L Twin Turbo V6	34	(Japan) Ryō Michigami	Y	All
(Japan) Modulo Drago Corse	Honda	Honda NSX GT3 Evo	Honda JNC1 3.5 L Twin Turbo V6	34	(Japan) Hiroki Otsu	Y	All
Panther arto Team Thailand	Lexus	Lexus RC F GT3	Lexus 2UR-GSE 5.4 L V8	35	(Thailand) Nattapong Horthongkum	Y	All
Panther arto Team Thailand	Lexus	Lexus RC F GT3	Lexus 2UR-GSE 5.4 L V8	35	(United Kingdom) Sean Walkinshaw	Y	All
Panther arto Team Thailand	Lexus	Lexus RC F GT3	Lexus 2UR-GSE 5.4 L V8	35	(Thailand) Nattavude Charoensukhawatana	Y	2
(Japan) BH Auction Bingo Racing	Callaway	Callaway Corvette C7 GT3-R	Callaway LT1 6.2 L V8	37	(Japan) Shinji Takei	Y	NC
(Japan) BH Auction Bingo Racing	Callaway	Callaway Corvette C7 GT3-R	Callaway LT1 6.2 L V8	37	(Japan) Ukyō Sasahara	Y	NC
(Japan) Saitama Toyopet GreenBrave	Toyota	Toyota Mark X MC	GTA V8 4.5 L V8	52	(Japan) Hiroki Yoshida	B	All, NC
(Japan) Saitama Toyopet GreenBrave	Toyota	Toyota Mark X MC	GTA V8 4.5 L V8	52	(Japan) Shigekazu Wakisaka	B	All, NC
(Japan) Kondo Racing	Nissan	Nissan GT-R Nismo GT3 (2018)	Nissan VR38DETT 3.8 L Twin Turbo V6	56	(Japan) Kazuki Hiramine	Y	All
(Japan) Kondo Racing	Nissan	Nissan GT-R Nismo GT3 (2018)	Nissan VR38DETT 3.8 L Twin Turbo V6	56	(France) Sacha Fenestraz	Y	All
(Japan) LM Corsa	Lexus	Lexus RC F GT3	Lexus 2UR-GSE 5.4 L V8	60	(Japan) Hiroki Yoshimoto	D	All, NC
(Japan) LM Corsa	Lexus	Lexus RC F GT3	Lexus 2UR-GSE 5.4 L V8	60	(Japan) Ritomo Miyata	D	1, 3–8, NC
(Japan) LM Corsa	Lexus	Lexus RC F GT3	Lexus 2UR-GSE 5.4 L V8	60	(Germany) Dominik Farnbacher	D	2
(Japan) LM Corsa	Ferrari	Ferrari 488 GT3	Ferrari F154CB 3.9 L Twin Turbo V8	70	(Japan) Shunsuke Kohno	Y	NC
(Japan) LM Corsa	Ferrari	Ferrari 488 GT3	Ferrari F154CB 3.9 L Twin Turbo V8	70	(Japan) Togo Suganami	Y	NC
(Japan) R&D Sport	Subaru	Subaru BRZ R&D Sport	Subaru EJ20 2.0 L Turbo F4	61	(Japan) Takuto Iguchi	D	All
(Japan) R&D Sport	Subaru	Subaru BRZ R&D Sport	Subaru EJ20 2.0 L Turbo F4	61	(Japan) Hideki Yamauchi	D	All
(Japan) K2 R&D LEON Racing	Mercedes-AMG	Mercedes-AMG GT3	Mercedes-AMG M159 6.2 L V8	65	(Japan) Haruki Kurosawa	B	1–5
(Japan) K2 R&D LEON Racing	Mercedes-AMG	Mercedes-AMG GT3	Mercedes-AMG M159 6.2 L V8	65	(Japan) Naoya Gamou	B	All
(Japan) K2 R&D LEON Racing	Mercedes-AMG	Mercedes-AMG GT3	Mercedes-AMG M159 6.2 L V8	65	(Japan) Togo Suganami	B	6–8
(Japan) JLOC	Lamborghini	Lamborghini Huracán GT3 1–5; Lamborghini Huracán GT3 Evo 6–8	Lamborghini DGF 5.2 L V10	87	(Japan) Tsubasa Takahashi	Y	All
(Japan) JLOC	Lamborghini	Lamborghini Huracán GT3 1–5; Lamborghini Huracán GT3 Evo 6–8	Lamborghini DGF 5.2 L V10	87	(Macau) André Couto	Y	All
(Japan) JLOC	Lamborghini	Lamborghini Huracán GT3 1–5; Lamborghini Huracán GT3 Evo 6–8	Lamborghini DGF 5.2 L V10	87	(Japan) Kiyoto Fujinami	Y	2, 5
(Japan) JLOC	Lamborghini	Lamborghini Huracán GT3 1–5; Lamborghini Huracán GT3 Evo 6–8	Lamborghini DGF 5.2 L V10	88	(Japan) Takashi Kogure	Y	All
(Japan) JLOC	Lamborghini	Lamborghini Huracán GT3 1–5; Lamborghini Huracán GT3 Evo 6–8	Lamborghini DGF 5.2 L V10	88	(Japan) Yuya Motojima	Y	All
(Japan) K-tunes Racing	Lexus	Lexus RC F GT3	Lexus 2UR-GSE 5.4 L V8	96	(Japan) Morio Nitta	B	All
(Japan) K-tunes Racing	Lexus	Lexus RC F GT3	Lexus 2UR-GSE 5.4 L V8	96	(Japan) Sena Sakaguchi	B	All
(Japan) Tomei Sports	Nissan	Nissan GT-R Nismo GT3 (2018)	Nissan VR38DETT 3.8 L Twin Turbo V6	360	(Japan) Takayuki Aoki	Y	1–3, 5–8, NC
(Japan) Tomei Sports	Nissan	Nissan GT-R Nismo GT3 (2018)	Nissan VR38DETT 3.8 L Twin Turbo V6	360	(Japan) Atsushi Tanaka	Y	1–2, 5–6, NC
(Japan) Tomei Sports	Nissan	Nissan GT-R Nismo GT3 (2018)	Nissan VR38DETT 3.8 L Twin Turbo V6	360	(Japan) Yusaku Shibata	Y	2, 3, 5, 7–8
McLaren Customer Racing Japan	McLaren	McLaren 720S GT3	McLaren M840T 4.0 L Twin Turbo V8	720	(Japan) Seiji Ara	Y	1–3, 5–8
McLaren Customer Racing Japan	McLaren	McLaren 720S GT3	McLaren M840T 4.0 L Twin Turbo V8	720	(Spain) Álex Palou	Y	1–3, 5–8

=== Vehicle changes ===
==== GT500 ====
- Toyota announced that the fifth-generation GR Supra would replace the Lexus LC 500 as the company's GT500 vehicle beginning in 2020. This was the final season for the Lexus marque in GT500, which had first appeared in 2006.

==== GT300 ====
- apr Racing launched an all-new version of their Toyota Prius GT, based on the fourth-generation Prius PHV. This new Prius, with a front-engine, rear-wheel drive configuration, replaced their previous mid-engined Prius GT - which was ruled out of competition due to a regulation change stating that GT300 cars must have their engines located in the same position as their production counterparts.
- ARTA and Team UPGarage changed vehicles to the Honda NSX GT3, replacing their previous BMW M6 GT3 and Toyota MC86, respectively.
- The second-generation Aston Martin Vantage GT3 made its Super GT debut via D'station Racing AMR, who replaced their previous Porsche 911 GT3-R.
- The McLaren 720S GT3 made its Japanese racing debut via McLaren Customer Racing Japan.

=== Entrant changes ===
==== GT500 ====
- Honda: Honda announced their GT500 lineups on 11 January.
  - Modulo became the new title sponsor for Nakajima Racing, who formed an all-new driver lineup featuring ex-Super Formula driver Narain Karthikeyan, and Tadasuke Makino, who returned to Japan after racing in Europe for two seasons.
  - Bertrand Baguette transferred to Keihin Real Racing, where he partnered Koudai Tsukakoshi.
  - Former F1 and GT500 driver Shinji Nakano became the new team director of Team Mugen.
- Lexus: Toyota Gazoo Racing announced the Lexus GT500 lineups on 7 February.
  - Kenta Yamashita transferred to Lexus Team Wako's LeMans, replacing Felix Rosenqvist, who left Super GT to compete in the IndyCar Series.
  - Sho Tsuboi and Yuichi Nakayama moved up to GT500 on a full-time basis, with Tsuboi joining Lexus Team WedsSport Bandoh, and Nakayama joining Lexus Team SARD to take the place of Kamui Kobayashi, who left Super GT to focus on the WEC.
  - Yuji Tachikawa was named the team director of Lexus Team ZENT Cerumo, along with his duties as lead driver.
- Nissan: Nissan announced their GT500 lineups on 7 February.
  - NDDP Racing with B-Max formed an all-new driver lineup: Kohei Hirate transferred to Nissan and secured his return to GT500 after a seventeen-year association with Toyota, while former Honda GT500 driver Frédéric Makowiecki returned to the series for the first time since 2014. They replaced Satoshi Motoyama, who had retired from GT500 driving, and Katsumasa Chiyo, who accepted a new assignment in the SRO Intercontinental GT Challenge. Masahiro Hasemi also retired as team director of NDDP Racing with B-Max, and was replaced by Toshikazu Tanaka.
  - James Rossiter rejoined Super GT on a full-time basis and completed a transfer from Toyota to Nissan, joining Team Impul.
  - Jann Mardenborough transferred to Kondo Racing, where he replaced the departing João Paulo de Oliveira.

==== GT300 ====
- Kondo Racing, in partnership with the Nissan Automobile Technical College, expanded to a multi-class effort with the addition of a GT300 team. Kazuki Hiramine, who drove for Kondo Racing in Super Taikyu, transferred from JLOC. Former Renault Sport Academy driver Sacha Fenestraz made his Super GT debut with the team.
- Virtual YouTuber Mirai Akari became the new primary sponsor for Pacific Racing with Good Speed, replacing Gulf Oil, which had sponsored Pacific since 2016. 2012 GT300 Champions Naoki Yokomizo and Kyosuke Mineo reunited at the wheel of their Porsche 911 GT3-R.
- Hong Kong-based team X Works made their series debut, fielding a Nissan GT-R NISMO GT3. Two drivers from Hong Kong, Marchy Lee and Shaun Thong, were announced as the full-time driver lineup. The team featured a new sponsorship deal to promote the animated series Neon Genesis Evangelion.
- Team Taisan, EIcars Bentley, and CarGuy Racing all withdrew from Super GT at the end of the 2018 season. Team Taisan had participated in all but one JGTC/Super GT season since the inaugural 1994 season, but shifted focus towards EV racing. CarGuy Racing began new programmes for the 24 Hours of Le Mans and Asian Le Mans Series.
- 2013 GT300 Champion Yuhki Nakayama joined apr, driving the number 31 Prius PHV GT alongside Koki Saga. Two-time GT300 champion Manabu Orido, who joined the number 30 apr team halfway through the 2018 season, was named as a full-time driver for 2019 alongside Hiroaki Nagai.
- Former Honda GT500 driver Kosuke Matsuura joined Takashi Kobayashi at Team UPGarage.
- Honda young driver Nirei Fukuzumi joined Shinichi Takagi at ARTA; Fukuzumi raced in Formula 2 and Super Formula in 2018, and made a one-off appearance for ARTA in the 2015 Suzuka 1000 km.
- Team Goh, who won the 1996 GT500 Championship as Team Lark McLaren GTR, returned to Super GT for the first time in 23 years as McLaren Customer Racing Japan. Seiji Ara, who won the 2004 24 Hours of Le Mans with Team Goh, returned to the series after a one-year absence. Former All-Japan Formula Three and European Formula 3 driver Álex Palou made his Super GT debut.
- K-Tunes Racing ended their collaboration with LM Corsa after the 2018 season, and the team run independently with technical support from INGING Motorsport. Former Honda young driver Sena Sakaguchi transferred into the Toyota programme, joining Morio Nitta aboard the K-Tunes Lexus RC F GT3.
- Last year runners up Sean Walkinshaw moves to ato Team Thailand alongside Nattapong Horthongkum, while Nattavude Charoensukhawatana demoted to third driver.
- LM Corsa changed tyre suppliers from Yokohama to Dunlop.
- Keishi Ishikawa transferred to GAINER, driving their number 10 Nissan GT-R NISMO GT3 alongside two-time GT300 champion Kazuki Hoshino.
- D'station Racing AMR signed former Nissan GT500 driver João Paulo de Oliveira to partner Tomonobu Fujii in their new Aston Martin Vantage GT3. Aston Martin factory driver Darren Turner was announced as their third driver for the Fuji 500 Mile Race.
- Kimiya Sato transferred from JLOC to Tsuchiya Engineering, joining 2016 GT300 champion Takamitsu Matsui.
- Saitama Toyopet GreenBrave changed tyre suppliers from Yokohama to Bridgestone. Hiroki Yoshida transferred from GAINER to GreenBrave, partnering Shigekazu Wakisaka.
- JLOC announced brand new driver lineups for both cars. The flagship number 88 car featured 2010 GT500 champion Takashi Kogure, who had recently departed Honda after 15 seasons as a GT500 driver, and Yuya Motojima, who moved over from the number 87 car. Tsubasa Takahashi, who was a third driver in the number 87 car in 2018, became a full-time driver, partnering 2015 GT300 champion André Couto, who returned to the series for the first time since 2017.

=== Mid-season changes ===
==== GT500 Class ====
- Ritomo Miyata makes his GT500 debut with TOM'S as he replaces Kazuki Nakajima who prioritize his WEC Campaign.
- James Rossiter who originally compete for round 6 has to withdraw after he fell sick. Katsumasa Chiyo replaces him for that round.

==== GT300 Class ====
- McLaren Customer Racing Japan, Tomei Sport, NILZZ Racing, Team Mach, and R'Qs Motor Sports did not participate in round four at Buriram.
- Dominik Farnbacher made a one-off appearance with LM Corsa, taking over from Miyata who move to GT500 for round 2.
- Shinya Michimi, who was the third driver for X-Works, replaced Marchy Lee from the sixth round onwards.
- Togo Suganami replaced Haruki Kurosawa at K2 R&D LEON Racing for the last two rounds.
- R'Qs Motor Sports missed round 7 due after their car suffered excessive damage in the previous round and was not repaired in time.

== Results ==
Round	Circuit	Date	Class	Pole position	Race winner
1	(Japan) Okayama International Circuit	14 April	GT500	No. 23 NISMO	No. 8 ARTA
1	(Japan) Okayama International Circuit	14 April	GT500	(Japan) Tsugio Matsuda (Italy) Ronnie Quintarelli	(Japan) Tomoki Nojiri (Japan) Takuya Izawa
1	(Japan) Okayama International Circuit	14 April	GT300	No. 55 ARTA	No. 96 K-tunes Racing
1	(Japan) Okayama International Circuit	14 April	GT300	(Japan) Shinichi Takagi (Japan) Nirei Fukuzumi	(Japan) Morio Nitta (Japan) Sena Sakaguchi
2	(Japan) Fuji Speedway	4 May	GT500	No. 23 NISMO	No. 38 Lexus Team ZENT Cerumo
2	(Japan) Fuji Speedway	4 May	GT500	(Japan) Tsugio Matsuda (Italy) Ronnie Quintarelli	(Japan) Yuji Tachikawa (Japan) Hiroaki Ishiura
2	(Japan) Fuji Speedway	4 May	GT300	No. 56 Kondo Racing	No. 11 GAINER
2	(Japan) Fuji Speedway	4 May	GT300	(Japan) Kazuki Hiramine (France) Sacha Fenestraz	(Japan) Katsuyuki Hiranaka (Japan) Hironobu Yasuda
3	(Japan) Suzuka Circuit	26 May	GT500	No. 36 Lexus Team au TOM'S	No. 36 Lexus Team au TOM'S
3	(Japan) Suzuka Circuit	26 May	GT500	(Japan) Kazuki Nakajima (Japan) Yuhi Sekiguchi	(Japan) Kazuki Nakajima (Japan) Yuhi Sekiguchi
3	(Japan) Suzuka Circuit	26 May	GT300	No. 25 Tsuchiya Engineering	No. 96 K-Tunes Racing
3	(Japan) Suzuka Circuit	26 May	GT300	(Japan) Takamitsu Matsui (Japan) Kimiya Sato	(Japan) Morio Nitta (Japan) Sena Sakaguchi
4	(Thailand) Chang International Circuit	30 June	GT500	No. 6 Lexus Team LeMans Wako's	No. 6 Lexus Team LeMans Wako's
4	(Thailand) Chang International Circuit	30 June	GT500	(Japan) Kazuya Oshima (Japan) Kenta Yamashita	(Japan) Kazuya Oshima (Japan) Kenta Yamashita
4	(Thailand) Chang International Circuit	30 June	GT300	No. 25 Tsuchiya Engineering	No. 10 GAINER
4	(Thailand) Chang International Circuit	30 June	GT300	(Japan) Takamitsu Matsui (Japan) Kimiya Sato	(Japan) Kazuki Hoshino (Japan) Keishi Ishikawa
5	(Japan) Fuji Speedway	4 August	GT500	No. 23 NISMO	No. 6 Lexus Team LeMans Wako's
5	(Japan) Fuji Speedway	4 August	GT500	(Japan) Tsugio Matsuda (Italy) Ronnie Quintarelli	(Japan) Kazuya Oshima (Japan) Kenta Yamashita
5	(Japan) Fuji Speedway	4 August	GT300	No. 52 Saitama Toyopet Green Brave	No. 87 JLOC
5	(Japan) Fuji Speedway	4 August	GT300	(Japan) Hiroki Yoshida (Japan) Shigekazu Wakisaka	(Japan) Tsubasa Takahashi (Macau) André Couto (Japan) Kiyoto Fujinami
6	(Japan) Autopolis	8 September	GT500	No. 17 Keihin REAL Racing	No. 39 Lexus Team SARD
6	(Japan) Autopolis	8 September	GT500	(Japan) Koudai Tsukakoshi (Belgium) Bertrand Baguette	(Finland) Heikki Kovalainen (Japan) Yuichi Nakayama
6	(Japan) Autopolis	8 September	GT300	No. 25 Tsuchiya Engineering	No. 60 LM Corsa
6	(Japan) Autopolis	8 September	GT300	(Japan) Takamitsu Matsui (Japan) Kimiya Sato	(Japan) Hiroki Yoshimoto (Japan) Ritomo Miyata
7	(Japan) Sportsland SUGO	22 September	GT500	No. 17 Keihin REAL Racing	No. 3 NDDP Racing with B-Max
7	(Japan) Sportsland SUGO	22 September	GT500	(Japan) Koudai Tsukakoshi (Belgium) Bertrand Baguette	(France) Frédéric Makowiecki (Japan) Kohei Hirate
7	(Japan) Sportsland SUGO	22 September	GT300	No. 61 R&D Sport	No. 55 ARTA
7	(Japan) Sportsland SUGO	22 September	GT300	(Japan) Takuto Iguchi (Japan) Hideki Yamauchi	(Japan) Shinichi Takagi (Japan) Nirei Fukuzumi
8	(Japan) Twin Ring Motegi	3 November	GT500	No. 36 Lexus Team au TOM'S	No. 37 Lexus Team KeePer TOM'S
8	(Japan) Twin Ring Motegi	3 November	GT500	(Japan) Kazuki Nakajima (Japan) Yuhi Sekiguchi	(Japan) Ryō Hirakawa (New Zealand) Nick Cassidy
8	(Japan) Twin Ring Motegi	3 November	GT300	No. 720 McLaren Customer Racing Japan	No. 11 GAINER
8	(Japan) Twin Ring Motegi	3 November	GT300	(Japan) Seiji Ara (Spain) Álex Palou	(Japan) Katsuyuki Hiranaka (Japan) Hironobu Yasuda
NC	(Japan) Fuji Speedway (Super GT × DTM Dream Race)	23–24 November	Race 1	No. 37 Lexus Team KeePer Tom's	No. 37 Lexus Team KeePer Tom's
NC	(Japan) Fuji Speedway (Super GT × DTM Dream Race)	23–24 November	Race 1	(New Zealand) Nick Cassidy	(New Zealand) Nick Cassidy
NC	(Japan) Fuji Speedway (Super GT × DTM Dream Race)	23–24 November	Race 2	No. 28 Audi Sport Team Phoenix (Note: Team Mugen's Daisuke Nakajima set the fastest time in qualifying, but received a five-place grid penalty for a chassis change after Hideki Mutoh crashed the car in Friday practice. Loïc Duval was promoted to pole position in his place.)	No. 64 Modulo Nakajima Racing
NC	(Japan) Fuji Speedway (Super GT × DTM Dream Race)	23–24 November	Race 2	(France) Loïc Duval	(India) Narain Karthikeyan
NC	(Japan) Fuji Speedway (auto sport Web Sprint Cup)	23–24 November	Race 1	No. 60 LM Corsa	No. 60 LM Corsa
NC	(Japan) Fuji Speedway (auto sport Web Sprint Cup)	23–24 November	Race 1	(Japan) Ritomo Miyata (Japan) Hiroki Yoshimoto	(Japan) Ritomo Miyata (Japan) Hiroki Yoshimoto
NC	(Japan) Fuji Speedway (auto sport Web Sprint Cup)	23–24 November	Race 2	No. 37 BH Auction Bingo Racing	No. 60 LM Corsa
NC	(Japan) Fuji Speedway (auto sport Web Sprint Cup)	23–24 November	Race 2	(Japan) Ukyo Sasahara (Japan) Shinji Takei	(Japan) Ritomo Miyata (Japan) Hiroki Yoshimoto

== Championship standings ==
=== Drivers' championships ===
Scoring system

Position	1st	2nd	3rd	4th	5th	6th	7th	8th	9th	10th	Pole
Points	20	15	11	8	6	5	4	3	2	1	1
Fuji 500 Miles	25	18	13	10	8	6	5	4	3	2	1

==== GT500 ====
Rank	Driver	Team	OKA‡ (Japan)	FUJ (Japan)	SUZ (Japan)	BUR (Thailand)	FUJ (Japan)	AUT (Japan)	SUG (Japan)	MOT (Japan)	NC1 (Japan)	NC2 (Japan)	Points
1	(Japan) Kenta Yamashita	(Japan) No. 6 Lexus Team LeMans Wako's	13	8	3	1	1	6	6	2	4		85
1	(Japan) Kazuya Oshima	(Japan) No. 6 Lexus Team LeMans Wako's	13	8	3	1	1	6	6	2		15	85
2	(New Zealand) Nick Cassidy	(Japan) No. 37 Lexus Team KeePer TOM'S	12	7	2	2	4	3	4	1	1		83
2	(Japan) Ryo Hirakawa	(Japan) No. 37 Lexus Team KeePer TOM'S	12	7	2	2	4	3	4	1		8	83
3	(Japan) Tsugio Matsuda	(Japan) No. 23 NISMO	2	2	Ret	11	3	13	3	8		11	52.5
3	(Italy) Ronnie Quintarelli	(Japan) No. 23 NISMO	2	2	Ret	11	3	13	3	8	12		52.5
4	(Japan) Yuji Tachikawa	(Japan) No. 38 Lexus Team ZENT Cerumo	8	1	6	7	Ret	4	11	4	9		46.5
4	(Japan) Hiroaki Ishiura	(Japan) No. 38 Lexus Team ZENT Cerumo	8	1	6	7	Ret	4	11	4		20	46.5
5	(Finland) Heikki Kovalainen	(Japan) No. 39 Lexus Team SARD	11	4	5	5	Ret	1	7	11		14	44
5	(Japan) Yuichi Nakayama	(Japan) No. 39 Lexus Team SARD	11	4	5	5	Ret	1	7	11	16		44
6	(Japan) Koudai Tsukakoshi	(Japan) No. 17 Keihin REAL Racing	14	5	Ret	13	8	2	5	5	2	21	39
6	(Belgium) Bertrand Baguette	(Japan) No. 17 Keihin REAL Racing	14	5	Ret	13	8	2	5	5			39
7	(Japan) Yuhi Sekiguchi	(Japan) No. 36 Lexus Team au TOM'S	9	Ret	1	9	Ret	10	10	3	7		38
7	(Japan) Kazuki Nakajima	(Japan) No. 36 Lexus Team au TOM'S	9		1	9	Ret	10	10	3		19	38
8	(Japan) Naoki Yamamoto	(Japan) No. 1 Team Kunimitsu	15	3	13	12	2	Ret	8	6	3	4	37
8	(United Kingdom) Jenson Button	(Japan) No. 1 Team Kunimitsu	15	3	13	12	2	Ret	8	6			37
9	(France) Frederic Makowiecki	(Japan) No. 3 NDDP Racing with B-Max Racing	4	6	9	6	11	11	1	DNS	11		36
9	(Japan) Kohei Hirate	(Japan) No. 3 NDDP Racing with B-Max Racing	4	6	9	6	11	11	1	DNS		18	36
10	(Japan) Takuya Izawa	(Japan) No. 8 ARTA	1	9	4	Ret	7	5	12	13	15		31
10	(Japan) Tomoki Nojiri	(Japan) No. 8 ARTA	1	9	4	Ret	7	5	12	13		22	31
11	(Japan) Sho Tsuboi	(Japan) No. 19 Lexus Team WedsSport Bandoh	6	13	7	3	9	8	13	7	5		27.5
11	(Japan) Yuji Kunimoto	(Japan) No. 19 Lexus Team WedsSport Bandoh	6	13	7	3	9	8	13	7		16	27.5
12	(India) Narain Karthikeyan	(Japan) No. 64 Modulo Nakajima Racing	10	10	11	10	10	7	2	12		1	23.5
12	(Japan) Tadasuke Makino	(Japan) No. 64 Modulo Nakajima Racing	10	10	11	10	10	7	2	12	Ret		23.5
13	(Japan) Daiki Sasaki	(Japan) No. 12 Team Impul	3	12	10	8	5	12	14	Ret	19		17.5
13	(United Kingdom) James Rossiter	(Japan) No. 12 Team Impul	3	12	10	8	5		14	Ret		17	17.5
14	(Japan) Mitsunori Takaboshi	(Japan) No. 24 Kondo Racing	5	14	8	4	Ret	9	15	10		12	17
14	(United Kingdom) Jann Mardenborough	(Japan) No. 24 Kondo Racing	5	14	8	4	Ret	9	15	10	17		17
15	(Japan) Daisuke Nakajima	(Japan) No. 16 Team Mugen	7	11	12	Ret	6	14	9	9		6	12
15	(Japan) Hideki Mutoh	(Japan) No. 16 Team Mugen	7	11	12	Ret	6	14	9	9	10		12
–	(Japan) Katsumasa Chiyo	(Japan) No. 12 Team Impul						12					0
–	(Japan) Ritomo Miyata	(Japan) No. 36 Lexus Team au TOM'S		Ret									0
Non Championship Round-only drivers
–	(Germany) Marco Wittmann	(Belgium) No. 11 BMW Team RBM									18	2	–
–	(France) Loïc Duval	(Germany) No. 28 Audi Sport Team Phoenix									Ret	3	–
–	(Japan) Kamui Kobayashi	(Belgium) No. 00 BMW Team RBM									14	5	–
–	(France) Benoît Tréluyer	(Japan) No. 21 Audi Sport Team WRT Hitotsuyama									6	10	–
–	(Germany) Mike Rockenfeller	(Germany) No. 99 Audi Sport Team Abt Sportsline									13	7	–
–	(Germany) René Rast	(Germany) No. 33 Audi Sport Team Rosberg									8	9	–
–	(Italy) Alex Zanardi	(Belgium) No. 4 BMW Team RBM									Ret	13	–
Rank	Driver	Team	OKA‡ (Japan)	FUJ (Japan)	SUZ (Japan)	BUR (Thailand)	FUJ (Japan)	AUT (Japan)	SUG (Japan)	MOT (Japan)	NC1 (Japan)	NC2 (Japan)	Points

Colour	Result
Gold	Winner
Silver	Second place
Bronze	Third place
Green	Points classification
Blue	Non-points classification
Blue	Non-classified finish (NC)
Purple	Retired, not classified (Ret)
Red	Did not qualify (DNQ)
Red	Did not pre-qualify (DNPQ)
Black	Disqualified (DSQ)
White	Did not start (DNS)
White	Withdrew (WD)
White	Race cancelled (C)
Blank	Did not practice (DNP)
Blank	Did not arrive (DNA)
Blank	Excluded (EX)

Notes:

‡ – The race at Okayama was red flagged after completing 30 laps. Due to less than 75% of the scheduled distance being completed, half points were awarded to the classified finishers.

==== GT300 ====
Driver Ranking GT300 2019 Series
Rank	Driver	Team	OKA‡ (Japan)	FUJ (Japan)	SUZ (Japan)	BUR (Thailand)	FUJ (Japan)	AUT (Japan)	SUG (Japan)	MOT (Japan)	NC1 (Japan)	NC2 (Japan)	Points
1	(Japan) Shinichi Takagi (Japan) Nirei Fukuzumi	(Japan) No. 55 ARTA	2	2	6	9	6	6	1	4			69.5
2	(Japan) Morio Nitta (Japan) Sena Sakaguchi	(Japan) No. 96 K-tunes Racing	1	16	1	14	15	5	3	3			58
3	(Japan) Katsuyuki Hiranaka (Japan) Hironobu Yasuda	(Japan) No. 11 GAINER	21	1	9	8	9	15	22	1			48
4	(Japan) Nobuteru Taniguchi (Japan) Tatsuya Kataoka	(Japan) No. 4 Goodsmile Racing with Team UKYO	8	6	4	12	8	4	2	5			47.5
5	(Japan) Naoya Gamou	(Japan) No. 65 K2 R&D LEON Racing	6	5	14	3	Ret	7	4	2			46.5
6	(Japan) Kazuki Hiramine (France) Sacha Fenestraz	(Japan) No. 56 Kondo Racing	5	4	18	2	7	8	5	6			46
7	(Japan) Takashi Kogure (Japan) Yuya Motojima	(Japan) No. 88 JLOC	10	3	19	5	5	3	20	11			36.5
8	(Japan) Tsubasa Takahashi (Macau) André Couto	(Japan) No. 87 JLOC	16	11	17	7	1	Ret	26	23			29
9	(Japan) Hiroki Yoshida (Japan) Shigekazu Wakisaka	(Japan) No. 52 Saitama Toyopet Green Brave	3	13	27	23	2	24	8	13	3	2	27.5
10	(Japan) Hiroki Yoshimoto	(Japan) No. 60 LM Corsa	7	9	10	15	22	1	19	9	1	1	27
11	(Japan) Togo Suganami	(Japan) No. 65 K2 R&D LEON Racing						7	4	2			27
11	(Japan) Togo Suganami	(Japan) No. 70 LM Corsa									5	4	27
12	(Japan) Ritomo Miyata	(Japan) No. 60 LM Corsa	7		10	15	22	1	19	9	1	1	25
13	(Japan) Kiyoto Fujinami	(Japan) No. 87 JLOC		11			1						25
14	(Japan) Kazuki Hoshino (Japan) Keishi Ishikawa	(Japan) No. 10 GAINER	Ret	10	12	1	14	10	15	16			22
15	(Japan) Seiji Ara (Spain) Álex Palou	No. 720 McLaren Customer Racing Japan	19	14	13		Ret	2	12	7			20
16	(Japan) Haruki Kurosawa	(Japan) No. 62 K2 R&D LEON Racing	6	5	14	3	Ret						19.5
17	(Japan) Ryō Michigami (Japan) Hiroki Otsu	(Japan) No. 34 Modulo Drago Corse	9	26	7	10	3	11	13	24			19
18	(Japan) Takuto Iguchi (Japan) Hideki Yamauchi	(Japan) No. 61 R&D Sport	4	28	3	11	10	Ret	28	12			18
19	(Japan) Takamitsu Matsui (Japan) Kimiya Sato	(Japan) No. 25 Tsuchiya Engineering	Ret	18	5	4	26	16	27	18	7	8	17
20	(Hong Kong) Shaun Thong	(Hong Kong) No. 33 X Works	Ret	7	28	6	16	19	6	8			17
21	(Japan) Natsu Sakaguchi (Japan) Yuya Hiraki	(Japan) No. 5 Team Mach	Ret	Ret	2		17	17	18	14			15
22	(Japan) Takashi Kobayashi (Japan) Kosuke Matsuura	(Japan) No. 18 Team UpGarage	11	12	15	24	4	9	10	19			13
23	(Japan) Shinya Michimi	(Hong Kong) No. 33 X Works		7			16	19	6	8			12
24	(United Kingdom) Richard Lyons (Japan) Ryuichiro Tomita	(Japan) No. 21 Audi Team Hitotsuyama	13	8	8	13	13	13	7	27			10
25	(Hong Kong) Marchy Lee	(Hong Kong) No. 33 X Works	Ret	7	28	6	16						5
26	(Germany) Dominik Farnbacher	(Japan) No. 60 LM Corsa		9									2
27	(Japan) Naoki Yokomizo (Japan) Kyosuke Mineo	(Japan) No. 9 Pacific Racing with Good Speed	15	22	22	16	19	22	9	15			2
28	(Japan) Takayuki Aoki	(Japan) No. 360 Tomei Sports	Ret	15	20		27	25	11	10	9	7	1
29	(Japan) Yusaku Shibata	(Japan) No. 360 Tomei Sport		15	20		27		11	10			1
–	(Japan) Shinnosuke Yamada	(Japan) No. 18 Team UpGarage		12			4 (Note: Shinnosuke Yamada did not run during the race as a third driver and was ineligible for championship points.)						0
–	(Japan) Koki Saga (Japan) Yuhki Nakayama	(Japan) No. 31 apr	12	19	11	18	18	14	23	20	8	6	0
–	(Japan) Tomonobu Fujii (Brazil) João Paulo de Oliveira	(Japan) No. 7 D'station Racing AMR	Ret	27	Ret	19	11	18	24	17			0
–	(United Kingdom) Darren Turner	(Japan) No. 7 D'station Racing AMR					11						0
–	(Japan) Kazuho Takahashi (Japan) Hiroki Katoh	(Japan) No. 2 Cars Tokai Dream28	14	23	23	21	12	23	17	29			0
–	(Japan) Masaki Kano (Japan) Ryōsei Yamashita	(Japan) No. 50 Arnage Racing	22	17	24	20	21	12	16	28			0
–	(Japan) Hiroshi Hamaguchi	(Japan) No. 50 Arnage Racing					12						0
–	(Belgium) Alessio Picariello	(Japan) No. 21 Audi Team Hitotsuyama		NC			13						0
–	(Japan) Masaki Tanaka (Japan) Taiyō Iida	(Japan) No. 48 NILZZ Racing	20	25	25		24	21	14	25	2	9	0
–	(Japan) Atsushi Tanaka	(Japan) No. 360 Tomei Sport	Ret	15			27	25			9	7	0
–	(Thailand) Nattapong Horthongkum (United Kingdom) Sean Walkinshaw	No. 35 Panther arto Team Thailand	18	24	16	17	20	20	21	22			0
–	(Japan) Hisashi Wada (Japan) Masaki Jyonai	(Japan) No. 22 R'Qs Motor Sports	17	20	26		23	Ret		26			0
–	(Japan) Yūya Tezuka	(Japan) No. 50 Arnage Racing		17			21						0
–	(Japan) Ryōhei Sakaguchi	(Japan) No. 5 Team Mach					17						0
–	(Japan) Takeshi Tsuchiya	(Japan) No. 25 Tsuchiya Engineering		18			26						0
–	(Japan) Takeshi Tsuchiya	(Japan) No. 244 Max Racing									11	10	0
–	(Japan) Akihiro Tsuzuki	(Japan) No. 9 Pacific Racing with Good Speed					19						0
–	(Japan) Hiroaki Nagai (Japan) Manabu Orido	(Japan) No. 30 apr	Ret	21	21	22	25	Ret	25	21	4	5	0
–	(Japan) Kazuto Kotaka	(Japan) No. 30 apr		21			25						0
–	(Japan) Kazuto Kotaka	(Finland) No. 11 Hanashima Racing									12	Ret	0
–	(Sweden) Björn Wirdheim	(Japan) No. 22 R'Qs Motor Sports					23						0
–	(Japan) Teruhiko Hamano	(Japan) No. 48 NILZZ Racing		25			24						0
–	(Thailand) Nattavude Charoensukhawatana	No. 35 Panther arto Team Thailand		24									0
–	(Japan) Tetsuji Tamanaka	(Japan) No. 5 Team Mach		Ret									0
Non Championship Round-only drivers
–	(Japan) Shinji Takei (Japan) Ukyo Sasahara	(Japan) No. 37 BH Auction Bingo Racing									6	3	–
–	(Japan) Shunsuke Kohno	(Japan) No. 70 LM Corsa									5	4	–
–	(Japan) "Go Max"	(Japan) No. 244 Max Racing									11	10	–
–	(Japan) "Joe Shindo" (Japan) Keiichi Inoue	(Japan) No. 9 MP Racing									10	11	–
–	(Japan) Katsuaki Kubota	(Finland) No. 11 Hanashima Racing									12	Ret	–
Rank	Driver	Team	OKA‡ (Japan)	FUJ (Japan)	SUZ (Japan)	BUR (Thailand)	FUJ (Japan)	AUT (Japan)	SUG (Japan)	MOT (Japan)	NC1 (Japan)	NC2 (Japan)	Points

Notes: ‡ – The race at Okayama was red flagged after completing 30 laps. Due to less than 75% of the scheduled distance being completed, half points were awarded to the classified finishers.
