= 2014 Japanese Formula 3 Championship =

Seasons
- ← 2013 2015 →

The 2014 Japanese Formula 3 Championship was the 36th edition of the Japanese Formula 3 Championship. It was held over 7 rounds and a total of 15 races, commencing on 12 April at Suzuka and culminating on 12 October at Fuji Speedway.

The overall championship title was won by HFDP Racing driver Nobuharu Matsushita, clinching the title with a fifth-place finish during the first race of the final meeting at Fuji. Matsushita claimed 6 wins during the season, including a hat-trick at the first Motegi meeting, and ultimately won the championship by 12 points, ahead of Kenta Yamashita, who was driving for Petronas Team TOM'S. Yamashita finished each of the first five races on the podium, and ultimately finished all bar three races on the podium during 2014; however, he was only able to win two races, winning the season opener at Suzuka as well as a race at Okayama. Third place in the championship went to Mitsunori Takaboshi, who won three races for the B-MAX Racing Team with NDDP. The remaining race victories were taken by Yamashita's team-mate Takamoto Katsuta and Daiki Sasaki (B-MAX Racing Team with NDDP), with each driver taking two wins. Petronas Team TOM'S did, however, take the teams' championship by 12 points ahead of the B-MAX Racing Team with NDDP. TOM'S also comfortable won the engine tuners' championship, 39 points clear of M-TEC.

The National class title was taken by Hanashima Racing and their driver Hiroshi Koizumi, after eight victories during the season; he also recorded the best finish for any of the drivers in the class, recording a seventh-place finish at the first Fuji meeting. Koizumi finished 27 points clear of Tochigi Le Beausset Motorsports' Rintaro Kubo, who won 5 races. Tairoku Yamaguchi finished a further 28 points in arrears, and was the only other race winner in the class, taking his sole triumph at Sugo.

== Teams and drivers ==
All teams were Japanese-registered.

Team	Chassis	Engine	No.	Driver	Rounds
Championship Class
Petronas Team TOM'S	Dallara F312	Toyota TOM'S TAZ31	1	(Japan) Takamoto Katsuta	All
Petronas Team TOM'S	Dallara F314	Toyota TOM'S TAZ31	36	(Japan) Kenta Yamashita	All
Toda Racing	Dallara F312	Toda TR-F301	2	(Japan) Shota Kiyohara	All
Toda Racing	Dallara F314	Toda TR-F301	21	(United Kingdom) Sam MacLeod	5
Toda Racing	Dallara F314	Toda TR-F301	21	(United Kingdom) Dan Wells	7
HFDP Racing	Dallara F312	Mugen-Honda MF204D	7	(Japan) Nobuharu Matsushita	All
HFDP Racing	Dallara F312	Mugen-Honda MF204D	8	(Japan) Tsubasa Takahashi	All
B-Max Racing Team	Dallara F312	Toyota TOM'S TAZ31	13	(Japan) Motoyoshi Yoshida	All
B-Max Racing Team with NDDP	Dallara F312	Toyota TOM'S TAZ31	22	(Japan) Mitsunori Takaboshi	All
B-Max Racing Team with NDDP	Dallara F312	Toyota TOM'S TAZ31	23	(Japan) Daiki Sasaki	All
Cerumo・Inging Jr	Dallara F312	Toyota TOM'S TAZ31	38	(Thailand) Nanin Indra-Payoong	All
National Class
Exedy Racing Team	Dallara F307	Toyota TOM'S 3S-GE	3	(Japan) Ai Miura	All
Hanashima Racing	Dallara F306	Toyota TOM'S 3S-GE	6	(Japan) Hiroshi Koizumi	All
KCMG	Dallara F308	Toyota TOM'S 3S-GE	19	(Japan) Shohei Yuzawa	All
Tairoku Exceed	Dallara F306	Toyota TOM'S 3S-GE	28	(Japan) Tairoku Yamaguchi	All
B-Max Racing Team	Dallara F306	Toyota TOM'S 3S-GE	30	(Japan) "Dragon"	All
Tochigi Le Beausset Motorsports	Dallara F308	Toyota TOM'S 3S-GE	62	(Japan) Rintaro Kubo	All
CMS	Dallara F306	Toyota TOM'S 3S-GE	77	(Japan) Masaru Miura	5, 7

== Race calendar and results ==
A provisional calendar for the 2014 season was released on 8 November 2013. On 10 June 2014 it was announced that the series would add two races in support of the FIA World Endurance Championship round at Fuji. All races were held in Japan.

Round		Circuit	Date	Pole position	Fastest lap	Winning driver	Winning team	National winner
1	R1	Suzuka Circuit	12 April	(Japan) Mitsunori Takaboshi	(Japan) Mitsunori Takaboshi	(Japan) Kenta Yamashita	Petronas Team TOM'S	(Japan) Rintaro Kubo
1	R2	Suzuka Circuit	13 April	(Japan) Kenta Yamashita	(Japan) Takamoto Katsuta	(Japan) Mitsunori Takaboshi	B-Max Racing Team with NDDP	(Japan) Ai Miura
2	R1	Twin Ring Motegi	10 May	(Japan) Nobuharu Matsushita	(Japan) Mitsunori Takaboshi	(Japan) Nobuharu Matsushita	HFDP Racing	(Japan) Rintaro Kubo
2	R2	Twin Ring Motegi	11 May	(Japan) Nobuharu Matsushita	(Japan) Kenta Yamashita	(Japan) Nobuharu Matsushita	HFDP Racing	(Japan) Hiroshi Koizumi
2	R3	Twin Ring Motegi	11 May		(Japan) Nobuharu Matsushita	(Japan) Nobuharu Matsushita	HFDP Racing	(Japan) Rintaro Kubo
3	R1	Okayama International Circuit	14 June	(Japan) Nobuharu Matsushita	(Japan) Daiki Sasaki	(Japan) Daiki Sasaki	B-Max Racing Team with NDDP	(Japan) Hiroshi Koizumi
3	R2	Okayama International Circuit	15 June	(Japan) Takamoto Katsuta	(Japan) Nobuharu Matsushita	(Japan) Kenta Yamashita	Petronas Team TOM'S	(Japan) Hiroshi Koizumi
4	R1	Fuji Speedway	12 July	(Japan) Mitsunori Takaboshi	(Japan) Mitsunori Takaboshi	(Japan) Mitsunori Takaboshi	B-Max Racing Team with NDDP	(Japan) Rintaro Kubo
4	R2	Fuji Speedway	13 July	(Japan) Nobuharu Matsushita	(Japan) Nobuharu Matsushita	(Japan) Nobuharu Matsushita	HFDP Racing	(Japan) Hiroshi Koizumi
5	R1	Twin Ring Motegi	23 August	(Japan) Shota Kiyohara	(Japan) Takamoto Katsuta	(Japan) Takamoto Katsuta	Petronas Team TOM'S	(Japan) Hiroshi Koizumi
5	R2	Twin Ring Motegi	24 August	(Japan) Mitsunori Takaboshi	(Japan) Daiki Sasaki	(Japan) Mitsunori Takaboshi	B-Max Racing Team with NDDP	(Japan) Hiroshi Koizumi
6	R1	Sportsland SUGO	27 September	(Japan) Nobuharu Matsushita	(Japan) Nobuharu Matsushita	(Japan) Nobuharu Matsushita	HFDP Racing	(Japan) Tairoku Yamaguchi
6	R2	Sportsland SUGO	28 September	(Japan) Mitsunori Takaboshi	(Japan) Mitsunori Takaboshi	(Japan) Nobuharu Matsushita	HFDP Racing	(Japan) Rintaro Kubo
7	R1	Fuji Speedway	11 October	(Japan) Daiki Sasaki	(Japan) Daiki Sasaki	(Japan) Takamoto Katsuta	Petronas Team TOM'S	(Japan) Hiroshi Koizumi
7	R2	Fuji Speedway	12 October	(Japan) Daiki Sasaki	(Japan) Takamoto Katsuta	(Japan) Daiki Sasaki	B-Max Racing Team with NDDP	(Japan) Hiroshi Koizumi

== Championship standings ==
=== Drivers' Championships ===
- Points were awarded as follows:

1	2	3	4	5	6	PP	FL
10	7	5	3	2	1	**1**	1

==== Overall ====
Pos	Driver	SUZ		MOT1			OKA		FUJ1		MOT2		SUG		FUJ2		Points
1	(Japan) Nobuharu Matsushita	4	4	**1**	**1**	1	**2**	14	4	**1**	4	2	**1**	1	5	3	102
2	(Japan) Kenta Yamashita	1	**3**	2	2	2	5	1	2	2	3	6	6	2	3	2	90
3	(Japan) Mitsunori Takaboshi	**2**	1	3	4	4	3	4	**1**	4	2	**1**	4	**Ret**	4	5	82
4	(Japan) Takamoto Katsuta	3	2	4	3	3	4	**3**	6	5	1	3	2	3	1	4	80
5	(Japan) Daiki Sasaki	7	6	6	5	5	1	2	3	3	6	4	5	5	**2**	**1**	63
6	(Japan) Shota Kiyohara	5	8	5	6	7	6	6	5	6	**Ret**	5	3	4	6	6	23
7	(Japan) Tsubasa Takahashi	6	5	8	7	Ret	8	7	7	Ret	5	8	8	7	7	8	5
8	(Thailand) Nanin Indra-Payoong	8	7	7	8	6	7	5	Ret	Ret	7	9	7	6	8	7	4
9	(Japan) Hiroshi Koizumi	10	11	10	9	11	9	8	10	7	8	10	NC	11	9	10	0
10	(Japan) Rintaro Kubo	9	10	9	12	8	10	13	8	Ret	10	11	Ret	8	12	Ret	0
11	(Japan) Ai Miura	11	9	11	Ret	10	14	11	11	8	9	14	Ret	12	Ret	12	0
12	(Japan) Tairoku Yamaguchi	12	12	12	10	9	12	10	9	11	11	12	9	Ret	13	11	0
13	(Japan) Shohei Yuzawa	15	14	14	11	12	11	9	12	9	Ret	13	10	9	11	Ret	0
14	(United Kingdom) Dan Wells														10	9	0
15	(Japan) "Dragon"	13	13	13	13	14	13	12	13	10	13	16	11	10	15	14	0
16	(Japan) Motoyoshi Yoshida	14	14	15	Ret	13	15	15	14	12	14	15	12	13	14	13	0
17	(Japan) Masaru Miura										12	17			16	15	0
Guest drivers ineligible for points
—	(United Kingdom) Sam MacLeod										Ret	7					
Pos	Driver	SUZ		MOT1			OKA		FUJ1		MOT2		SUG		FUJ2		Points

Colour	Result
Gold	Winner
Silver	Second place
Bronze	Third place
Green	Points classification
Blue	Non-points classification
Blue	Non-classified finish (NC)
Purple	Retired, not classified (Ret)
Red	Did not qualify (DNQ)
Red	Did not pre-qualify (DNPQ)
Black	Disqualified (DSQ)
White	Did not start (DNS)
White	Withdrew (WD)
White	Race cancelled (C)
Blank	Did not practice (DNP)
Blank	Did not arrive (DNA)
Blank	Excluded (EX)

**Bold** – Pole
Italics – Fastest Lap

==== National Class ====
Pos	Driver	SUZ		MOT1			OKA		FUJ1		MOT2		SUG		FUJ2		Points
1	(Japan) Hiroshi Koizumi	10	11	**10**	9	11	9	**8**	10	**7**	**8**	10	NC	11	**9**	**10**	124
2	(Japan) Rintaro Kubo	**9**	**10**	9	12	8	**10**	13	**8**	Ret	10	**11**	**Ret**	**8**	12	Ret	97
3	(Japan) Tairoku Yamaguchi	12	12	12	**10**	9	12	10	9	11	11	12	9	Ret	13	11	69
4	(Japan) Ai Miura	11	9	11	Ret	10	14	11	11	8	9	14	Ret	12	Ret	12	55
5	(Japan) Shohei Yuzawa	15	14	14	11	12	11	9	12	9	Ret	13	10	9	11	Ret	55
6	(Japan) "Dragon"	13	13	13	13	14	13	12	13	10	13	16	11	10	15	14	33
7	(Japan) Masaru Miura										12	17			16	15	4
Pos	Driver	SUZ		MOT1			OKA		FUJ1		MOT2		SUG		FUJ2		Points

=== Teams' Championship ===
- Points were awarded as follows:

1	2	3	4	5	6
10	7	5	3	2	1

Pos	Team	SUZ		MOT1			OKA		FUJ1		MOT2		SUG		FUJ2		Points
1	Petronas Team TOM'S	1	2	2	2	2	4	1	2	2	1	3	2	2	1	2	111
2	B-Max Racing Team with NDDP	2	1	3	4	4	1	2	1	3	2	1	4	5	2	1	99
3	HFDP Racing	4	4	1	1	1	2	7	4	1	4	2	1	1	5	3	93
4	Toda Racing	5	8	5	6	7	6	6	5	6	Ret	5	3	4	6	6	22
5	Cerumo・Inging Jr	8	7	7	8	6	7	5	Ret	Ret	7	9	7	6	8	7	4
NC	Hanashima Racing	10	11	10	9	11	9	8	10	7	8	10	Ret	11	9	10	0
NC	Tochigi Le Beausset Motorsports	9	10	9	12	8	10	13	8	Ret	10	11	Ret	8	12	Ret	0
NC	Exedy Racing Team	11	9	11	Ret	10	14	11	11	8	9	14	Ret	12	Ret	12	0
NC	Tairoku Exceed	12	12	12	10	9	12	10	9	11	11	12	9	Ret	13	11	0
NC	KCMG	15	14	14	11	12	11	9	12	9	Ret	13	10	9	11	Ret	0
NC	B-Max Racing Team	13	13	13	13	13	13	12	13	10	13	15	11	10	14	13	0
NC	CMS										12	17			16	15	0
Pos	Team	SUZ		MOT1			OKA		FUJ1		MOT2		SUG		FUJ2		Points

=== Engine Tuners' Championship ===
Pos	Tuner	SUZ		MOT1			OKA		FUJ1		MOT2		SUG		FUJ2		Points
1	TOM'S	1	1	2	2	2	1	1	1	2	1	1	2	2	1	1	132
2	M-TEC	4	4	1	1	1	2	7	4	1	4	2	1	1	5	3	93
3	Toda Racing	5	8	5	6	7	6	6	5	6	Ret	5	3	4	6	6	22
Pos	Tuner	SUZ		MOT1			OKA		FUJ1		MOT2		SUG		FUJ2		Points
