= Ryuji Yamamoto =

Japanese racing driver

- Nationality: (Japan) Japanese
- Born: 17 October 1988 (age 38)

Previous series
- Formula Renault UK, Formula Renault WEC, Japanese Formula 3, Formula Challenge Japan

Championship titles
- 2004: CIK-ICA Asian-Pacific Championship

Ryuji Yamamoto (born 17 October 1988) is a Japanese racing driver who last competed in the Japanese Formula 3. He was runner-up for the Formula Challenge Japan in its debut year, 2006, before moving to Europe to compete in the Formula Renault championships. He signed with the Nissan Driver Development Program.

== Career ==
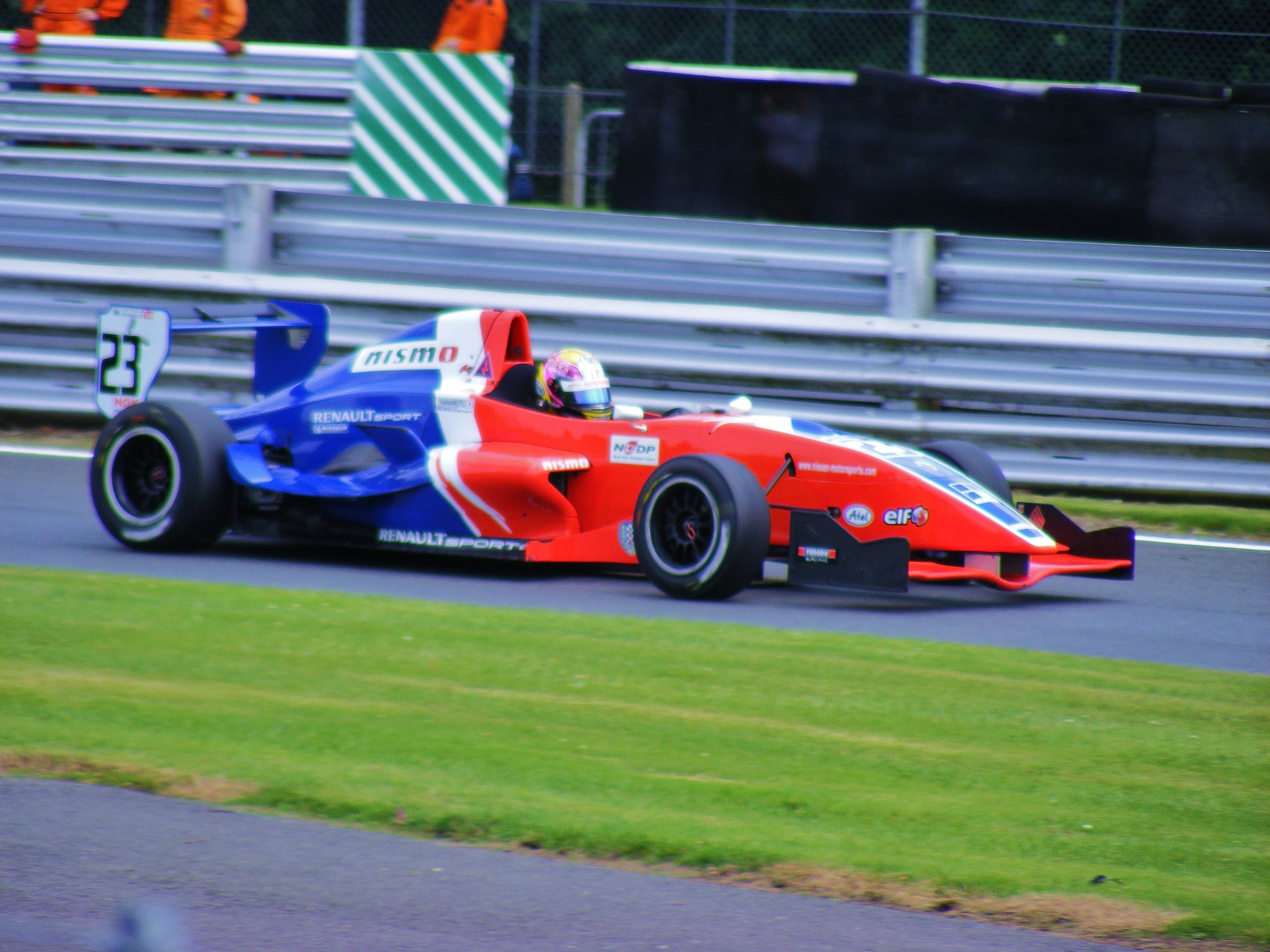
Ryuji Yamamoto exits the pit lane at Oulton Park at the beginning of his qualifying session for a British Formula Renault race.

=== Karting ===
In Asia, Yamamoto had a successful career in karting, winning the Asian-Pacific Championship in 2004, his sophomore year in the competition. He remained in karts until 2005.

=== Open wheel ===
After a successful career in kart, Yamamoto changed to open wheel categories in 2006. He participated in the first season of the Formula Challenge Japan, achieving the second place in the season, and in the World Cup Formula A, alongside drivers like Riki Christodoulou, Alexander Sims, Alvaro Parente and Jules Bianchi.

In 2007, Yamamoto moved to Europe and joined the Formula Renault, competing in France and England for the Fortec Motorsports and CR Scuderia as part of the Nissan Driver Development Program.

After two years in the European Formula Renault, 42 races, no wins and only two podiums, Yamamoto returned to Japan and joined the Japanese Formula 3 for the AIM Sports team. He participated in only two races.
