= Takuto Iguchi =

Japanese racing driver (born 1988)

- Nationality: Japanese
- Born: 13 February 1988 (age 38) Yanagawa, Fukuoka, Japan

Super GT career
- Debut season: 2008
- Current team: R&D Sport
- Categorisation: FIA Silver
- Car number: 61
- Former teams: Shift apr Lexus Team SARD; LMP Motorsport
- Starts: 56
- Wins: 3
- Best finish: 1st in 2010

Previous series
- 2010 2008-2009 2006-2007 2006-2007: Formula Nippon; All Japan Formula Three; Formula Challenge Japan; Formula Toyota

Takuto Iguchi (井口 卓人, Iguchi Takuto; born 13 February 1988) is a Japanese racing driver who currently competes in Super GT for R&D Sport. Alongside teammate Hideki Yamauchi, he was champion of the 2021 Super GT Series in the GT300 class; he has also previously competed in Formula Nippon and as a factory driver for Toyota.

== Racing career ==
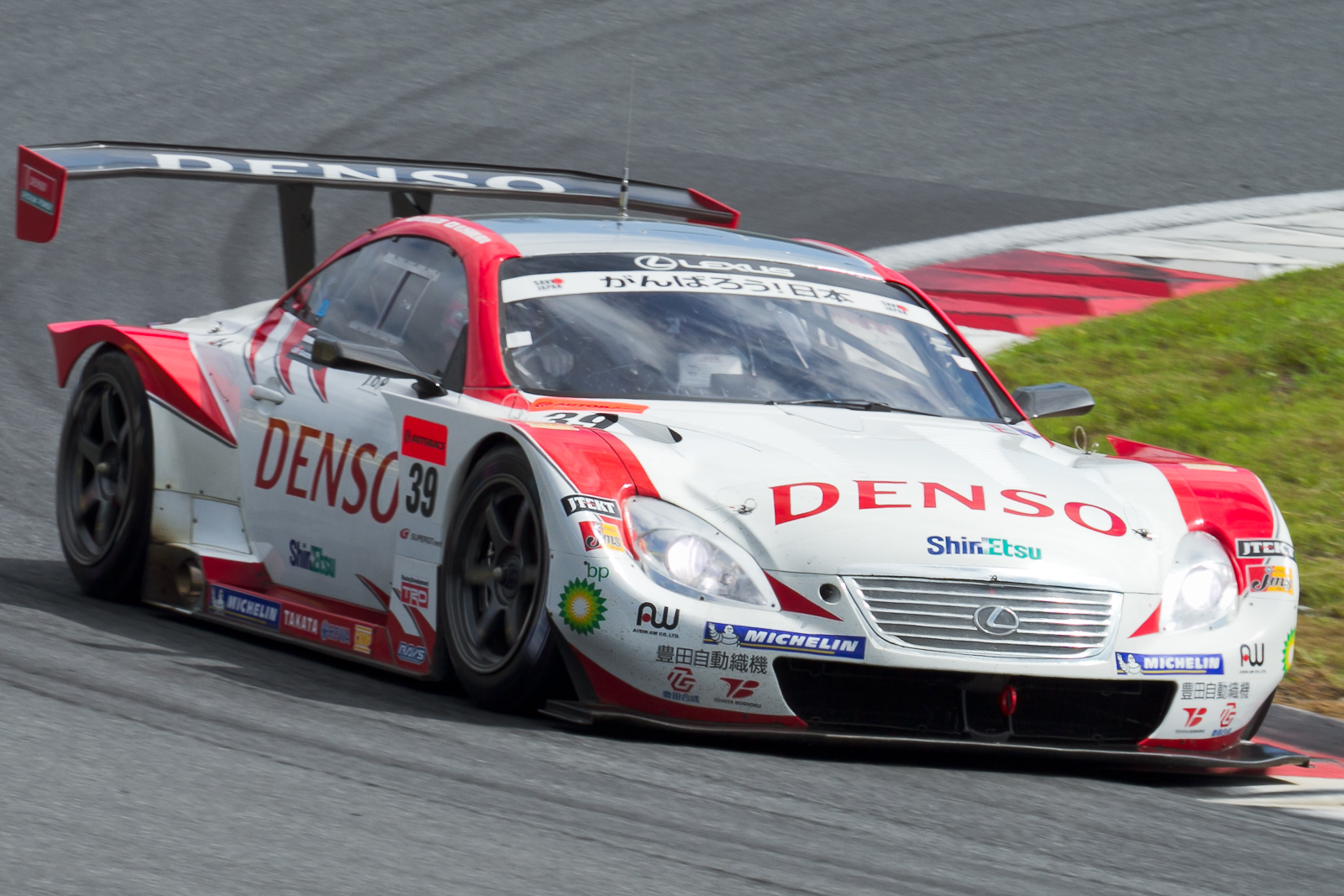
Iguchi driving the Lexus SC430 GT500 for SARD in 2011.

Iguchi began his motorsports career in 2000 with kart racing in his hometown of Fukuoka. Iguchi raced karts in various Japanese series, winning the FA class of the All Japan Kart Championship in 2005.

Between 2006 and 2007, Iguchi raced in the Formula Toyota and Formula Challenge Japan series.

Iguchi moved to All Japan Formula Three in 2008, racing for TOM'S. He finished sixth place in the 2009 Macau Grand Prix, The highest place finish of any Japanese driver that year. Iguchi raced one season of Formula Nippon in 2010 for Deliziefollie/Cerumo-Inging finishing thirteenth in the drivers' championship.

Iguchi began racing in Super GT in 2008. He currently drives for R&D Sport in a Subaru BRZ.

=== Nurburgring 24 hours ===
Iguchi first took competed in the 24 Hours Nurburgring in 2012 taking the SP3 class victory with Gazoo Racing in a Toyota 86. Takuto Iguchi raced in the 2014 and 2015 24 Hours Nurburgring also for Gazoo, racing a Lexus LFA CodeX in both races and won the SP-PRO class victory both years.

== Racing record ==
=== Career summary ===
Season	Series	Team name	Races	Wins	Poles	F/Laps	Podiums	Points	Position
2006	Formula Challenge Japan		10	0	0	0	1	34	10th
2007	Formula Challenge Japan		18	1	0	1	4	115	6th
2007	Formula Toyota	Tom's Spirit	7	2	4	3	?	82	**3rd**
2008	Japanese Formula 3 Championship	Petronas Team TOM'S	18	3	4	6	12	216	**3rd**
2008	Super GT - GT300	Team Takeuchi with Shift	7	0	0	0	0	3	32nd
2009	Japanese Formula 3 Championship	Petronas Team TOM'S	16	5	3	3	12	103	**2nd**
2009	Super GT - GT300	apr	9	0	0	0	0	32	10th
2009	Macau Grand Prix	TOM'S	1	0	0	0	0	N/A	6th
2010	Super GT - GT300	EVA Racing Team apr	7	1	0	1	3	40	5th
2010	Formula Nippon	Deliziefollie/Cerumo-Inging	8	0	0	0	0	3	13th
2011	Super GT - GT500	Lexus Team SARD	7	0	0	0	1	40	7th
2011	Formula Nippon	Petronas Team TOM'S	1	0	0	0	0	0	NC
2012	Super GT - GT300	LMP Motorsport	7	0	0	0	0	7	21st
2012	24 Hours of Nürburgring - SP3	Gazoo Racing	1	1	0	0	1	N/A	**1st**
2013	Super GT - GT300	R&D Sport	1	1	1	0	1	25	10th
2014	Super GT - GT300	R&D Sport	8	1	1	1	2	44	5th
2014	24 Hours of Nürburgring - SP-PRO	Gazoo Racing	1	1	0	0	1	N/A	**1st**
2015	Super GT - GT300	R&D Sport	8	0	0	0	1	30	12th
2015	24 Hours of Nürburgring - SP-PRO	Team Toyota Gazoo Racing	1	1	0	0	1	N/A	**1st**
2016	Super GT - GT300	R&D Sport	7	1	0	0	3	47	6th
2016	24 Hours of Nürburgring - SP-PRO	Toyota Gazoo Racing with Tom's	1	1	1	1	1	N/A	**1st**
2017	Super GT - GT300	R&D Sport	7	0	0	0	1	30	9th
2017	24 Hours of Nürburgring - SP3T	Toyota Gazoo Racing	1	0	0	0	1	N/A	**2nd**
2018	Super GT - GT300	R&D Sport	8	1	0	0	2	37	8th
2018	24 Hours of Nürburgring - SP3T	Subaru Tecnica International	1	1	1	1	1	N/A	**1st**
2019	Super GT - GT300	R&D Sport	8	0	1	0	1	18	18th
2019	24 Hours of Nürburgring - SP3T	Subaru Tecnica International	1	1	1	1	1	N/A	**1st**
2020	Super GT - GT300	R&D Sport	8	0	0	0	2	44	5th
2021	Super GT - GT300	R&D Sport	8	1	0	0	4	67	**1st**
2022	Super GT - GT300	R&D Sport	8	0	1	0	0	49.5	**2nd**
2023	Super GT - GT300	R&D Sport	8	0	0	0	1	40	8th
2023	24 Hours of Nürburgring - SP4T	Subaru Tecnica International	1	0	1	1	1	N/A	**2nd**
2024	Super GT - GT300	R&D Sport	8	0	0	0	0	15	16th
2025	Super GT - GT300	R&D Sport	8	0	2	1	2	65	9th
2025	Super Taikyu Series - ST-Q	Team SDA Engineering	4	2	3	?	4	0	NC
2025	TGR GR86/BRZ Cup	Team Takuty	7	0	0	1	4	80	**2nd**
2026	Super GT - GT300	R&D Sport	8	0	2	1	0	24	27th
2026	Nürburgring Langstrecken-Serie - SP4T	Subaru Tecnica International	2	1	1	0	1	*	*
2026	TGR GR86/BRZ Cup	Team Takuty							

* Season still in progress.

=== Complete Japanese Formula 3 results ===
(key) (Races in bold indicate pole position) (Races in italics indicate fastest lap)

Year	Team	Engine	1	2	3	4	5	6	7	8	9	10	11	12	13	14	15	16	17	18	DC	Pts
2008	Petronas Team TOM'S	Toyota	**FUJ**; **1**; 1	**FUJ**; **2**; 1	**AUT**; **1**; 1	AUT; 2; 2	SUZ; 1; 8	SUZ; 2; 11	MOT; 1; 4	MOT; 2 Ret	**OKA**; **1**; 8	OKA; 2; 3	SUZ; 1; 4	SUZ; 2; 3	MOT; 1; 3	MOT; 2; 3	FUJ; 1; 2	FUJ; 2; 3	SUG; 1; 2	SUG; 2; 3	3rd	216
2009	Petronas Team TOM'S	Toyota	FUJ; 1; 1	**FUJ**; **2**; 1	OKA; 1; 1	OKA; 2; 9	SUZ; 1; 2	SUZ; 2; 3	FUJ; 1; 3	FUJ; 2; 2	SUZ; 1; 6	SUZ; 2; 2	MOT; 1; 3	MOT; 2; 4	**AUT**; **1**; 1	**AUT**; **2**; 1	SUG; 1; 3	SUG; 2 Ret			2nd	103

=== Complete Super GT results ===
Year	Team	Car	Class	1	2	3	4	5	6	7	8	9	DC	Pts
2008	Shift	Lexus IS350	GT300	SUZ	OKA	FUJ; Ret	SEP; 13	SUG; 17	SUZ; 18	MOT; 8	AUT; 12	FUJ; 13	32nd	3
2009	apr	Toyota Corolla Axio	GT300	OKA; 5	SUZ; 9	FUJ; 8	SEP; 16	SUG; 8	SUZ; 4	FUJ; 12	AUT; 7	MOT; 5	10th	32
2010	apr	Toyota Corolla Axio	GT300	SUZ; 8	OKA; 9	FUJ; 1	SEP; 3	SUG; Ret	SUZ; 3	FUJ; C	MOT; 17		5th	47
2011	Lexus Team SARD	Lexus SC430	GT500	OKA; 13	FUJ; 6	SEP; 13	SUG; 2	SUZ; 5	FUJ; 8	AUT; 15	MOT; 3		7th	40
2012	LMP Motorsport	Ferrari F430 GTC	GT300	OKA; 10	FUJ; 17	SEP; 13	SUG; 18	SUZ; 8	FUJ; 14	AUT; 9	MOT; 14		21st	7
2013	R&D Sport	Subaru BRZ	GT300	OKA	FUJ	SEP	SUG	SUZ; 1	FUJ	FUJ	AUT	MOT	10th	25
2014	R&D Sport	Subaru BRZ	GT300	OKA; 21	FUJ; 12	AUT; 2	SUG; 14	**FUJ**; 1	SUZ; 9	BUR; 5	MOT; 17		5th	44
2015	R&D Sport	Subaru BRZ	GT300	OKA; 17	FUJ; 8	CHA; 6	FUJ; 10	SUZ; 3	SUG; 5	AUT; Ret	MOT; 11		11th	30
2016	R&D Sport	Subaru BRZ	GT300	OKA; 23	FUJ; 11	MOT; 23	SUG; 3	FUJ; 3	SUZ; 1	CHA; Ret	MOT; 11		6th	47
2017	R&D Sport	Subaru BRZ	GT300	OKA ret	FUJ; 13	AUT; 2	FUJ; 9	SUZ; 4	SUG; 7	CHA ret	MOT ret		9th	45
2018	R&D Sport	Subaru BRZ	GT300	OKA; 18	FUJ; Ret	SUZ; 3	CHA; Ret	FUJ; Ret	SUG; 1	AUT; 15	MOT; 6		8th	37
2019	R&D Sport	Subaru BRZ	GT300	OKA; 4‡	FUJ; 28	SUZ; 3	CHA; 11	FUJ; 10	AUT; Ret	SUG; 28	MOT; 12		18th	18
2020	R&D Sport	Subaru BRZ	GT300	FUJ (1); Ret	FUJ (2); 2	SUZ (1); 4	MOT (1); 3	FUJ (3); 16	SUZ (2); 12	MOT (2); 5	FUJ (4); 8		5th	44
2021	R&D Sport	Subaru BRZ GT300	GT300	OKA; 15	**FUJ**; 2	SUZ; 10	**MOT**; 11	**SUG**; 1	**AUT**; 3	MOT; 6	FUJ; 3		1st	67
2022	R&D Sport	Subaru BRZ GT300	GT300	**OKA**; 9	**FUJ**; 3	SUZ; 12	FUJ; 1	SUZ; 18	**SUG**; 8	**AUT**; 2	MOT; 20		2nd	49.5
2023	R&D Sport	Subaru BRZ GT300	GT300	OKA; 22	FUJ; 11	**SUZ**; 6	FUJ; 6	**SUZ**; 3	SUG; 4	AUT; 4	MOT; 10		8th	40
2024	R&D Sport	Subaru BRZ GT300	GT300	OKA; 26^{3}†	FUJ; 15	SUZ; Ret^{2}	FUJ; 24	SUG; 5^{2}	AUT; 25†	MOT; Ret	SUZ; 7^{2}		16th	15
2025	R&D Sport	Subaru BRZ GT300	GT300	OKA; 13	FUJ; 8	SEP; 8	FS1; 9	FS2 (Ret)	**SUZ**; 2	SUG; 22†	AUT; 24†	**MOT**; 2	9th	65
2026	R&D Sport	Subaru BRZ GT300	GT300	OKA; 17	**FUJ**; 27†	FUJ; 28	SUZ; 28†	SUG; 3	**AUT**; 13	MOT; 22†	MOT; 13		27th	24

^{‡} Half points awarded as less than 75% of race distance was completed. ^{*} Season still in progress.

=== Complete Formula Nippon results ===
(key) (Races in bold indicate pole position; races in italics indicate fastest lap)

Year	Team	Engine	1	2	3	4	5	6	7	8	DC	Pts
2010	Deliziefollie/Cerumo-Inging	Toyota	SUZ; 11	MOT; Ret	FUJ; 12	MOT; 12	SUG; 10	AUT; 6	SUZ; 1 Ret	SUZ; 2 Ret	13th	3
2011	Petronas Team TOM'S	Toyota	SUZ	AUT; 11	FUJ	MOT	SUZ	SUG	MOT; 1	MOT; 2	18th	0
