= 2011 Macau Grand Prix =

Formula Three motor race

Race details
Date	19–20 November 2011
Official name	58th SJM Macau Grand Prix
Location	Guia Circuit, Macau
Course	Temporary street circuit 6.120 km (3.803 mi)
Distance	Qualifying Race; 10 laps, 61.200 km (38.028 mi); Main Race; 15 laps, 91.800 km (57.042 mi)
Weather	Qualifying Race: Bright, air 28 °C (82 °F), track 32 °C (90 °F); Main Race: Cloudy, air 25 °C (77 °F), track 27 °C (81 °F)
- Qualifying Race

Pole
Driver	(Germany) Marco Wittmann	Signature
Time	2:12.790

Fastest Lap
Driver	(Spain) Roberto Merhi	Prema Powerteam
Time	2:13.654 (on lap 7)

Podium
First	(Germany) Marco Wittmann	Signature
Second	(Brazil) Felipe Nasr	Carlin
Third	(Spain) Roberto Merhi	Prema Powerteam
- Main Race

Pole
Driver	(Germany) Marco Wittmann	Signature

Fastest Lap
Driver	(Germany) Marco Wittmann	Signature
Time	2:12.146 (on lap 13)

Podium
First	(Spain) Daniel Juncadella	Prema Powerteam
Second	(Brazil) Felipe Nasr	Carlin
Third	(Germany) Marco Wittmann	Signature

The 2011 Macau Grand Prix Formula Three was the 58th Macau Grand Prix race to be held, and was held on the streets of Macau on 20 November 2011. It was the 29th edition for Formula Three cars, and was supported by the 2011 Guia Race of Macau. The race weekend also formed the final two rounds of the inaugural FIA Formula 3 International Trophy, which had been won prior to Macau by Formula 3 Euro Series champion Roberto Merhi. The race itself was made up of two races: a ten-lap qualifying race that decided the starting grid for the fifteen-lap main race.

For the first time, the Grand Prix was won by a Spanish driver, as Prema Powerteam's Daniel Juncadella took victory from sixth position on the grid. Juncadella's victory was also the first for an Italian team since Forti Corse won the 1988 race with Enrico Bertaggia. Second place was claimed by Felipe Nasr for Carlin, with the podium completed by Qualification Race winner Marco Wittmann for Signature. The Grand Prix itself was a race of attrition, as only 13 of the race's 29 starters were running at the conclusion of the race.

== Background and entry list ==
The Macau Grand Prix is a Formula Three race considered to be a stepping stone to higher motor racing categories such as Formula One and is Macau's most prestigious international sporting event. The 2011 Macau Grand Prix was the fifty-eighth running of the event and the twenty-ninth time the race was held to Formula Three regulations. It took place on the 6.2-kilometre (3.9 mi) twenty-two turn Guia Circuit on 20 November 2011 with three preceding days of practice and qualifying.

In order to compete in Macau, drivers had to compete in an FIA-regulated championship meeting during the calendar year, in either the FIA Formula 3 International Trophy or one of the domestic championships, with these drivers given priority in receiving an invitation to the meeting. Within the 30-car grid of the event, each of the major Formula Three series were represented by their respective champion. Roberto Merhi, the Euro Series and FIA International Trophy champion, was joined in Macau by British champion Felipe Nasr, German series winner Richie Stanaway and Japanese champion Yuhi Sekiguchi, who was a late addition to the entry list after an injured wrist ruled out Michael Ho.

Four drivers from the GP3 Series, including champion Valtteri Bottas, also made a return to Formula Three for the event, and Eurocup Formula Renault 2.0 runner-up Carlos Sainz Jr. was also part of the field, having competed in the Euro Series in its season-closing round at the Hockenheimring order to compete at Macau. Bottas raced at the British Formula Three meeting at Donington Park in September to prepare for Macau, while his fellow GP3 Series competitors Alexander Sims and Mitch Evans sealed their eligibility by taking part in the series' season-ending round at the Silverstone Circuit the month after.

== Report ==
=== Practice and qualifying ===
Marco Wittmann set the fastest time for Signature in the 45-minute first free practice session that was held prior to the first qualifying session, setting a lap time almost two seconds quicker than anyone else on a drying Guia circuit. His closest challenger was Prema Powerteam's Daniel Juncadella ahead of Mücke Motorsport's Yuhi Sekiguchi, the other Prema car of Roberto Merhi, and Lucas Foresti completed the top five for Fortec Motorsport ahead of Carlin trio of Kevin Magnussen, Felipe Nasr and Carlos Huertas. Owing to the wet conditions, the session was stopped on two occasions; the stationary cars of Hironobu Yasuda and Evans at the Melco hairpin caused the first red flag almost 20 minutes into the session, with Felix Rosenqvist the cause of the second stoppage as he took avoiding action to stop himself running into.a line of stationary vehicles at the same turn.

"I want to finish this race after last year. I want to make sure I get through to the final, and try to win this Macau GP. I think we have the potential, the team has done a good job and I think I am very competitive and very confident. In any conditions I am going to be really quick, and I am confident in myself. It has been a difficult weekend for me. In the first qualifying I was P1 but I had an accident with [Felix] Rosenqvist and because of that accident I had a seven-place grid penalty. Then this morning I had a crash in San Francisco, and because of that crash I wasn't pushing so hard in this corner. I was taking care every time. But I was P1 in qualifying and all the time I was battling with Marco [Wittmann]. He did a good job to improve on my best time and put me down to P2, but it has been all year like this, and it is nice to come here again to be P1 and P2."

— Roberto Merhi provisionally qualified second on the grid, but was demoted to eighth for the qualification race.

The qualifying period was split into two sessions; the first was held on Thursday afternoon and ran for 30 minutes with the second held on Friday afternoon and was similarly timed to the previous day's session. The fastest time set by each driver from either session counted towards his final starting position for the qualification race. The first qualifying session saw Merhi on top, again with a margin of over 1.5 seconds to the field. However, his session came to an early end in deteriorating track conditions as he misjudged his braking for Lisboa corner and ran into the back of Rosenqvist, ending the session for both drivers. Wittmann ended up second ahead of Nasr, Juncadella and Sims. Sekiguchi finished the session in sixth place ahead of top-placed rookie Hannes van Asseldonk and António Félix da Costa with William Buller and Rosenqvist rounding out the top ten. Following them were Foresti, Kimiya Sato with Richie Stanaway and Magnussen provisionally lining up on row seven. Daniel Abt, who held the lead of the Grand Prix before crashing out in 2010, was next ahead of Jazeman Jaafar, Marko Asmer, Laurens Vanthoor and Jimmy Eriksson. Adderly Fong ended the session in 20th, ahead of Carlos Muñoz, Huertas, Hideki Yamauchi, Carlos Sainz Jr., Hywel Lloyd, Evans, Valtteri Bottas, Pietro Fantin, Richard Bradley and Yasuda. After qualifying, numerous penalties were handed out. For earlier free practice incidents, Magnussen and Rosenqvist were sent to the back of the field. Rosenqvist was also given a three-place grid penalty for illegally crossing the pit lane exit line, along with session pacesetter Merhi, Asmer and Signature teammates Vanthoor, Muñoz and Sainz. Yasuda was given a six-place grid drop for crossing the line on two occasions. Merhi was then given another grid penalty for running into Rosenqvist, taking his total drop for the qualification race to ten places. Prior to second qualifying, Merhi, Rosenqvist and van Asseldonk – whose original penalty had not been announced – had their penalties rescinded.

"The session was really, really good; Roberto [Merhi] and I were fighting hard for a good lap time. During the session my first fastest lap was a 2m13.1s, and I thought maybe it was enough. But then Roberto improved and I had to go again. Here, you need to try and get a tow because you can gain some good lap time, but for the last laps I couldn't get it - so I tried really hard to push in the city to go really quick. To do it on the last lap was really amazing, and it is a great feeling to finish first in qualifying. But still we have two long races and, as you know, you can overtake here quite easily on the main straight. But I think we have good pace and for that I am quite confident."

— Marco Wittmann, after taking pole position for Signature.

In the second 45-minute practice session, Wittmann and Merhi fought for the top spot again as the track had dried out from earlier rain, and drivers were able to use slick tyres for the first time in the meeting. Wittmann came out on top by three tenths of a second, ahead of Merhi. Juncadella, Sainz and Nasr filled out the rest of the top five, the only other drivers to be within a second of the pace set by Wittmann. The session had to be stopped three times due to crashes, as Félix da Costa crashed early on at Moorish corner, Merhi hit the barriers at San Francisco Bend turn after running wide, and teammate Juncadella also crashed into the barriers late on. Juncadella also became another driver to be penalised three places on the grid for illegally crossing the pit lane exit line.

In the second qualifying session, Wittmann set the early pace in the session before Merhi, looking to record as fast a time as possible in order to minimise his potential grid loss, moved ahead. Wittmann and Merhi then traded fastest times once more before Wittmann took pole position with his final lap of the session, by 0.064 seconds ahead of Merhi. With Merhi's penalty, Félix da Costa moved onto the front row, despite twice having problems with a sticking throttle. Also moving ahead of Merhi were Bottas, Sims, Nasr, Huertas and Sekiguchi, as Magnussen and Rosenqvist – who were both quicker than Huertas and Sekiguchi – had already been sent to the back of the grid for their Thursday misdemeanours. The rest of the field lined up after penalties as Vanthoor, Sato, Juncadella, Asmer, Muñoz, top debutant Fantin, Jaafar, Abt, van Asseldonk, Stanaway, Sainz, Buller, Yamauchi, Lloyd, Foresti, Bradley, Fong, Yasuda, Eriksson and Evans – who failed to record times within 110% of Wittmann in second qualifying – who would start ahead of Magnussen and Rosenqvist. The session passed relatively smoothly, with only Abt – after contact from Bradley – and Nasr hitting the barriers.

=== Qualification Race ===
"From the start I got two places straight away, after [Alexander] Sims crashed and [António Félix] da Costa stalled. I was third into the first corner and managed to get a good tow from [Valtteri] Bottas and we were three wide into Lisboa. I was in the middle so I didn't have the right line to come out first and I was cautious not to make contact. I managed to come out in second though and then I just focused on keeping the car out of the walls so we could have a good position for tomorrow. Both [Marco] Wittmann and [Roberto] Merhi were very quick; Wittmann had a strong car in the middle sector, but I was fast in the final sector and was able to close on him there and pull away from Merhi a little. I think we need to look at the data to see how we can improve further so we are even strong tomorrow, but second place is a great position to start from in Macau."

— Felipe Nasr finished second, holding off race-long pressure from Roberto Merhi.

The qualification race to set the grid order for the main race on 19 November was delayed from its start time of 14:00 Macau Standard Time (UTC+08:00) by 30 minutes after earlier barrier damage from the GT Cup qualifying session. On his installation lap to the grid, Sims crashed his car at the Solitude Esses; he recovered to the pit lane, but failed to start the race due to extensive damage to the left-front corner of his car. At the start, Wittmann made the best start as Félix da Costa failed to get away from the line with a mechanical problem; he eventually did get started, but last. Behind them, Merhi made the best start and moved all the way up to fourth place on the first lap, behind Wittmann, Nasr and Bottas. Further back, Fantin became the race's first retirement, crashing out heavily, but the safety car was not called for because his vehicle was recovered by a trackside crane.

Merhi slipstreamed onto the back of Bottas, and then outbraked him in the braking zone at Lisboa turn to move into third place, while further back, Muñoz pulled off circuit from eleventh place with mechanical issues. Also pulling off in the first half of the race were Yasuda via a trip to the pit lane, Félix da Costa, who was languishing at the back of the field after his stall, and Bradley after contact with Evans. Merhi then set his sights on Nasr, trying on two successive laps at Lisboa corner, before yellow flags halted his challenge for a time as Félix da Costa's car was recovered, and also due to the debris from the Bradley-Evans collision. The race's overtaking was curtailed on the eighth lap, as Eriksson put his Motopark car into the barriers at Police turn, and as such, the race ended under the safety car. Wittmann thus took victory and pole position for the Grand Prix itself, and would be joined on the front row by Nasr after holding off Merhi's advances. Merhi completed the podium, ahead of Bottas, who finished fourth ahead of Huertas, Juncadella, Vanthoor, Abt, Sato and van Asseldonk, the last quartet gaining positions after Asmer slowed. Outside the top ten, Yamauchi finished eleventh ahead of Sekiguchi, Buller, Foresti, Stanaway, Lloyd, Jaafar, Asmer, Magnussen, Sainz, Rosenqvist and Evans rounded out the 22 classified finishers.

=== Main Race ===
Prior to the start of the main race under cloudy but warm weather conditions at 15:30 local time on 20 November, Yasuda pulled into the pit lane with mechanical issues, and retired; reducing the field to 28 drivers as Eriksson failed to start the race after his crash during the Qualification Race. The front row of Wittmann and Nasr made decent starts but chaos ensued behind. Merhi stalled in third position, which caused the remainder of the field to scramble for any open spaces that were available to them. Vanthoor clipped the front of Merhi's car which sent him spinning across the track and eventually collected his teammate Abt, with both out on the spot. Merhi was not out of trouble for long as Stanaway rammed into the back of him, with Stanaway out on the spot and Merhi, who made it back to the pit lane, eventually retired with a damaged rear wing and suspension damage. Wittmann held the lead to Lisboa turn with Bottas, Juncadella and Nasr all close to the Signature driver's car. Fifth-placed Huertas was not so fortunate in making it round Lisboa corner unscathed, spinning in front of the pack, and pinning Sato in behind him.

Ultimately, the safety car was called for due to the extensive debris that was remaining on the pit straight. Racing resumed at the end of lap three, with Wittmann holding onto the lead from Bottas, despite pressure all the way to Lisboa turn from the pit straight. Juncadella and Nasr fell in behind, with Yamauchi completing the top five. Nasr moved ahead of Bottas by the end of the fourth lap, with Bottas not lasting much longer in the race. On the run to Lisboa corner, Nasr, Bottas and Juncadella were three-wide on the straight with Bottas braking the latest for Lisboa, but clipped the barrier on the outside of the corner, causing damage to the left side of his car, and retired from the race. Juncadella took advantage of Nasr being slightly slowed in the corner and moved into second place. Evans also exited the race with braking issues. Wittmann extended his lead to three seconds over Juncadella but that was nullified after Rosenqvist hit the barriers at Faraway turn.

"I was quite lucky with the safety car, and I didn't really expect to win, but this feeling is amazing. I still can't believe it. I think the key was doing what I heard from one guy before the start. He said the thing is to stay out of trouble on the first lap - so I did that. Yesterday I was thinking to attack a lot in the first moments, but staying out of trouble in tight moments was the key for winning this race. So when the second safety car came and I was second, I knew I had my chance. My top speed was really good today and I could overtake Marco [Wittmann]. But I had to really concentrate when I overtook him under braking, because I nearly crashed into the wall. I cannot believe how lucky I am to win this race. When I was in first place on that lap [when he took the lead], I had never made so many mistakes in my life. I was lucky that the guy in P2, I think it was [Yuhi] Sekiguchi, was not really a serious contender for the win. So I pushed really hard in the second sector and I made so many mistakes as I was shaking in the car, honestly. I tried to stay calm and concentrate on pushing a lot in the second sector, so Felipe [Nasr] could not get close to the slipstream. Then the safety car came out and it was all over. On the last lap with the safety car I have never cried that much in my life!"

— Daniel Juncadella, after becoming the first Spaniard to win the Macau Grand Prix.

At the next restart, Wittmann did not hold the lead like he had done previously; such was the slipstream of the other cars, that Wittmann finished the tenth lap in fifth place. Juncadella took the lead, with Sekiguchi moving into second place almost unnoticed, barging his way past Nasr into Lisboa corner, with van Asseldonk following close behind. Nasr eventually found his way back past Sekiguchi into second place, and after closing back in on van Asseldonk, Wittmann reeled off times in the 2:12 bracket even while passing the Hitech driver. Wittmann then set the fastest lap of the race on lap 13, while passing Sekiguchi for third place. Just like in the Qualification Race, the race was finished under neutralised safety car conditions after two separate incidents on lap 14. At the Mandarin, Yamauchi made an error after being passed by Foresti, and caused a chain reaction within the next few cars to approach the incident. Magnussen was trying to pass Buller, and went over the back over his car at 165 mph (266 km/h), flying into the catch-fencing on the outside of the circuit, but escaped with just a left knee injury that was caused by him hitting it inside his cockpit. Lloyd braked to avoid the incident but was hit from behind by Sainz; as a result, Lloyd was taken to the circuit's medical centre for a checkup. Sims was also involved, and retired as well.

As such, Juncadella held on to the end and became the first Spanish driver to win the Grand Prix. Juncadella's victory was also the first for an Italian team since Forti Corse won the 1988 race with Enrico Bertaggia. Nasr held second to the end, holding off Wittmann's ever-increasing pressure that was eventually negated by the appearance of the safety car. Sekiguchi finished in fourth place ahead of van Asseldonk, both having been a part of the lead group during the race. Buller survived unscathed from the incident with Magnussen to finish in sixth place, teammate Foresti, also after a close call, was seventh ahead of Jaafar. The top ten was rounded out by Bradley and Fong, both of whom had started the race outside the top 20. Outside the top ten, Fantin finished eleventh having moved up eighteen from his start position, and finished ahead of Sato, with Huertas 13th ahead of Magnussen, Yamauchi, Lloyd, Sainz, Sims and Asmer, the six drivers who retired in the closing stages, and the sextet rounded out the 19 classified finishers.

== Classification ==
=== Qualifying ===
Pos	No.	Driver	Team	Q1 Time	Rank	Q2 Time	Rank	Gap	Grid
1	1	(Germany) Marco Wittmann	Signature	2:30.535	2	2:12.790	1		1
2	11	(Spain) Roberto Merhi	Prema Powerteam	2:28.860	1	2:12.854	2	+ 0.064	8^{1}
3	22	(Portugal) António Félix da Costa	Hitech Racing	2:31.901	8	2:13.115	3	+ 0.325	2
4	26	(Finland) Valtteri Bottas	Double R Racing	2:35.877	27	2:13.192	4	+ 0.402	3
5	15	(United Kingdom) Alexander Sims	TOM'S	2:31.306	5	2:13.407	5	+ 0.617	4
6	7	(Brazil) Felipe Nasr	Carlin	2:30.639	3	2:13.429	6	+ 0.639	5
7	8	(Denmark) Kevin Magnussen	Carlin	2:33.281	14	2:13.518	7	+ 0.728	29^{2}
8	19	(Sweden) Felix Rosenqvist	Mücke Motorsport	2:32.457	10	2:13.528	8	+ 0.738	30^{3}
9	9	(Colombia) Carlos Huertas	Carlin	2:34.675	22	2:13.704	9	+ 0.914	6
10	20	(Japan) Yuhi Sekiguchi	Mücke Motorsport	2:31.634	6	2:13.850	10	+ 1.060	7
11	2	(Belgium) Laurens Vanthoor	Signature	2:33.881	18	2:13.973	11	+ 1.183	9^{4}
12	25	(Estonia) Marko Asmer	Double R Racing	2:33.866	17	2:14.011	12	+ 1.221	12^{4}
13	4	(Colombia) Carlos Muñoz	Signature	2:34.278	21	2:14.020	13	+ 1.230	13^{4}
14	12	(Spain) Daniel Juncadella	Prema Powerteam	2:30.867	4	2:14.064	14	+ 1.274	11^{4}
15	28	(Japan) Kimiya Sato	Motopark	2:32.891	12	2:14.246	15	+ 1.456	10
16	21	(Brazil) Pietro Fantin	Hitech Racing	2:36.057	28	2:14.415	16	+ 1.625	14
17	10	(Malaysia) Jazeman Jaafar	Carlin	2:33.588	16	2:14.477	17	+ 1.687	15
18	5	(Spain) Carlos Sainz Jr.	Signature	2:34.744	24	2:14.511	18	+ 1.721	19^{4}
19	3	(Germany) Daniel Abt	Signature	2:33.428	15	2:14.513	19	+ 1.723	16
20	23	(Netherlands) Hannes van Asseldonk	Hitech Racing	2:31.891	7	2:14.591	20	+ 1.801	17
21	32	(New Zealand) Richie Stanaway	Van Amersfoort Racing	2:32.996	13	2:14.625	21	+ 1.835	18
22	17	(United Kingdom) William Buller	Fortec Motorsport	2:32.295	9	2:14.649	22	+ 1.859	20
23	14	(Japan) Hideki Yamauchi	Toda Racing	2:34.725	23	2:14.863	23	+ 2.073	21
24	30	(United Kingdom) Hywel Lloyd	Sino Vision Racing	2:34.750	25	2:15.022	24	+ 2.232	22
25	18	(Brazil) Lucas Foresti	Fortec Motorsport	2:32.551	11	2:15.061	25	+ 2.271	23
26	16	(United Kingdom) Richard Bradley	TOM'S	2:36.823	29	2:15.855	26	+ 3.065	24
27	29	(Hong Kong) Adderly Fong	Sino Vision Racing	2:34.273	20	2:16.666	27	+ 3.876	25
28	6	(Japan) Hironobu Yasuda	ThreeBond Racing	2:42.441	30	2:22.302	28	+ 9.512	26^{5}
110% qualifying time: 2:26.069
29	27	(Sweden) Jimmy Eriksson	Motopark	2:34.034	19	2:55.360	29	+ 21.244	27^{6}
30	24	(New Zealand) Mitch Evans	Double R Racing	2:35.133	26	no time		+ 22.343	28^{6}
Bold time indicates the faster of the two times that determined the grid order.

Notes
1. – Roberto Merhi was dropped seven places on the grid for causing a collision with Felix Rosenqvist.
2. – Kevin Magnussen started at the back of the grid, after ignoring yellow flags during first qualifying.
3. – Felix Rosenqvist started at the back of the grid, behind Kevin Magnussen, after overtaking under yellow flags and an incident in free practice.
4. – Carlos Muñoz, Laurens Vanthoor, Carlos Sainz Jr., Marko Asmer and Daniel Juncadella were given three-place grid penalties for the qualification race, for illegally crossing the pit lane exit line.
5. – Hironobu Yasuda was penalised six places for illegally crossing the pit lane exit line twice.
6. – Despite not setting a qualifying time within 110% of polesitter Marco Wittmann's time, Jimmy Eriksson and Mitch Evans were allowed to race at the stewards' discretion.

=== Qualification Race ===
Pos	No.	Driver	Team	Laps	Time/Retired	Grid
1	1	(Germany) Marco Wittmann	Signature	10	25:03.719	1
2	7	(Brazil) Felipe Nasr	Carlin	10	+ 0.867	5
3	11	(Spain) Roberto Merhi	Prema Powerteam	10	+ 3.483	8
4	26	(Finland) Valtteri Bottas	Double R Racing	10	+ 4.270	3
5	9	(Colombia) Carlos Huertas	Carlin	10	+ 4.850	6
6	12	(Spain) Daniel Juncadella	Prema Powerteam	10	+ 5.381	11
7	2	(Belgium) Laurens Vanthoor	Signature	10	+ 6.512	9
8	3	(Germany) Daniel Abt	Signature	10	+ 7.228	16
9	28	(Japan) Kimiya Sato	Motopark	10	+ 8.154	10
10	23	(Netherlands) Hannes van Asseldonk	Hitech Racing	10	+ 9.337	17
11	14	(Japan) Hideki Yamauchi	Toda Racing	10	+ 10.200	21
12	20	(Japan) Yuhi Sekiguchi	Mücke Motorsport	10	+ 10.789	7
13	17	(United Kingdom) William Buller	Fortec Motorsport	10	+ 11.086	20
14	18	(Brazil) Lucas Foresti	Fortec Motorsport	10	+ 11.517	23
15	32	(New Zealand) Richie Stanaway	Van Amersfoort Racing	10	+ 12.167	18
16	30	(United Kingdom) Hywel Lloyd	Sino Vision Racing	10	+ 12.888	22
17	10	(Malaysia) Jazeman Jaafar	Carlin	10	+ 13.967	15
18	25	(Estonia) Marko Asmer	Double R Racing	10	+ 14.933	12
19	8	(Denmark) Kevin Magnussen	Carlin	10	+ 15.558	29
20	5	(Spain) Carlos Sainz Jr.	Signature	10	+ 16.388	19
21	19	(Sweden) Felix Rosenqvist	Mücke Motorsport	10	+ 16.924	30
22	24	(New Zealand) Mitch Evans	Double R Racing	10	+ 18.601	28
Ret	27	(Sweden) Jimmy Eriksson	Motopark	7	Accident	27
Ret	29	(Hong Kong) Adderly Fong	Sino Vision Racing	6	Accident	25
Ret	16	(United Kingdom) Richard Bradley	TOM'S	5	Collision	24
Ret	22	(Portugal) António Félix da Costa	Hitech Racing	4	Gearbox	2
Ret	6	(Japan) Hironobu Yasuda	ThreeBond Racing	3	Engine	26
Ret	4	(Colombia) Carlos Muñoz	Signature	1	Clutch	13
Ret	21	(Brazil) Pietro Fantin	Hitech Racing	0	Accident	14
DNS	15	(United Kingdom) Alexander Sims	TOM'S		Accident damage	4
Fastest lap: Roberto Merhi, 2:13.654, 164.844 km/h (102.429 mph) on lap 7
The race finished under neutralised safety car conditions.

=== Main Race ===
Pos	No.	Driver	Team	Laps	Time/Retired	Grid
1	12	(Spain) Daniel Juncadella	Prema Powerteam	15	42:17.099	6
2	7	(Brazil) Felipe Nasr	Carlin	15	+ 0.359	2
3	1	(Germany) Marco Wittmann	Signature	15	+ 0.662	1
4	20	(Japan) Yuhi Sekiguchi	Mücke Motorsport	15	+ 1.378	12
5	23	(Netherlands) Hannes van Asseldonk	Hitech Racing	15	+ 2.128	10
6	17	(United Kingdom) William Buller	Fortec Motorsport	15	+ 3.301	13
7	18	(Brazil) Lucas Foresti	Fortec Motorsport	15	+ 3.860	14
8	10	(Malaysia) Jazeman Jaafar	Carlin	15	+ 4.062	17
9	16	(United Kingdom) Richard Bradley	TOM'S	15	+ 4.595	25
10	29	(Hong Kong) Adderly Fong	Sino Vision Racing	15	+ 4.819	24
11	21	(Brazil) Pietro Fantin	Hitech Racing	15	+ 5.551	30
12	28	(Japan) Kimiya Sato	Motopark	15	+ 6.534	9
13	9	(Colombia) Carlos Huertas	Carlin	15	+ 8.336	5
Ret	8	(Denmark) Kevin Magnussen	Carlin	13	Collision	19
Ret	14	(Japan) Hideki Yamauchi	Toda Racing	13	Collision	11
Ret	30	(United Kingdom) Hywel Lloyd	Sino Vision Racing	13	Collision	16
Ret	5	(Spain) Carlos Sainz Jr.	Signature	13	Collision	20
Ret	15	(United Kingdom) Alexander Sims	TOM'S	13	Collision	29
Ret	25	(Estonia) Marko Asmer	Double R Racing	13	Engine	18
Ret	22	(Portugal) António Félix da Costa	Hitech Racing	12	Wheel	26
Ret	4	(Colombia) Carlos Muñoz	Signature	9	Accident	28
Ret	19	(Sweden) Felix Rosenqvist	Mücke Motorsport	6	Accident	21
Ret	26	(Finland) Valtteri Bottas	Double R Racing	4	Accident	4
Ret	24	(New Zealand) Mitch Evans	Double R Racing	4	Brakes	22
Ret	11	(Spain) Roberto Merhi	Prema Powerteam	1	Collision damage	3
Ret	3	(Germany) Daniel Abt	Signature	0	Collision	8
Ret	32	(New Zealand) Richie Stanaway	Van Amersfoort Racing	0	Collision	15
Ret	2	(Belgium) Laurens Vanthoor	Signature	0	Collision	7
Ret	6	(Japan) Hironobu Yasuda	ThreeBond Racing	0	Engine	27
DNS	27	(Sweden) Jimmy Eriksson	Motopark		Accident damage	23
Fastest lap: Marco Wittmann, 2:12.146, 166.725 km/h (103.598 mph) on lap 13
The race finished under neutralised safety car conditions.
