= Yuhi Sekiguchi =

Japanese racing driver (born 1987)

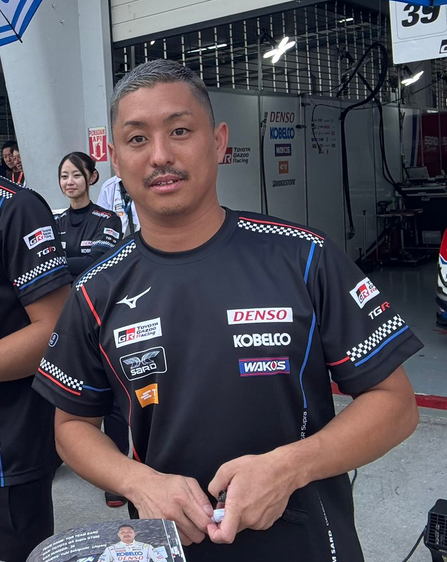
- Sekiguchi at the 2025 Super GT Malaysia Festival
- Nationality: (Japan) Japanese
- Born: 29 December 1987 (age 38) Tokyo, Japan

Super GT - GT500 career
- Debut season: 2007
- Current team: TGR Team SARD
- Car number: 39
- Former teams: TOM'S, Racing Project Bandoh; MOLA
- Starts: 105
- Championships: 1
- Wins: 5
- Podiums: 20
- Poles: 4
- Fastest laps: 3
- Best finish: 1st in 2021

Previous series
- 2014-2023 2011 2009-10 2008–09 2008 2007, 2011-12 2007 2006 2004–06 2004 2003: Super Formula; All-Japan Formula Three; All-Japan F3 National Class; GP2 Asia Series; International Formula Master; Super GT - GT300; All-Japan Formula Three; Formula Challenge Japan; Formula Toyota; Asian Formula Renault; Asia-Pacific Championship ICA

Championship titles
- 2021 2011 2006 2006: Super GT - GT500; All-Japan Formula Three; Formula Challenge Japan; Formula Toyota

Yuhi Sekiguchi (関口雄飛, Sekiguchi Yūhi; born 29 December 1987 in Nakano, Tokyo) is a Japanese racing driver. He currently competes in the GT500 class of the Super GT Series for TGR Team SARD.

Sekiguchi won the 2011 Japanese Formula 3 Championship and the 2021 Super GT GT500 class championship.

== Career ==
Sekiguchi made his single-seater debut in 2004 after winning a scholarship from Toyota to compete in the Japanese Formula Toyota series. He also raced part time in the Asian Formula Renault Challenge. In 2006, Sekiguchi won the Formula Toyota championship in his third season, and also won the inaugural Formula Challenge Japan championship.

=== All-Japan Formula Three ===
Sekiguchi moved up to the All-Japan Formula Three Championship in 2007, driving for the Now Motor Sports team owned by Naohiro Fujita. He finished seventh overall in the points standings.

=== International Formula Master ===
Sekiguchi moved to Europe in 2008 to compete in the International Formula Master championship. He finished sixteenth in the points standings, with two fourth-place finishes at Imola and Monza.

=== GP2 Series ===
In late 2008, Sekiguchi competed in the first round of the 2008–09 GP2 Asia Series season for the David Price Racing team. His team-mate was Michael Herck. He was the fourth Japanese driver in the championship, alongside Sakon Yamamoto, Kamui Kobayashi, and Hiroki Yoshimoto. However, he was then replaced by Giacomo Ricci from the second round onwards.

=== Return to All-Japan Formula Three ===
Sekiguchi returned to the All-Japan Formula Three Championship for 2009, finishing fifth in the National class with AIM Sports. He moved to ThreeBond Racing and finished second in the 2010 championship with three wins, then took part in his first Macau Grand Prix. In 2011, Sekiguchi moved to B-Max Engineering and won the series championship with six victories. He then went on to finish fourth in that year's Macau Grand Prix driving for Mücke Motorsport.

Afterwards, Sekiguchi would make part-time appearances in All-Japan F3 with B-Max in 2013 and 2015. He also returned to the Macau Grand Prix in 2013, 2015, 2017, and 2018.

=== Super GT (2007-) ===
==== GT300 (2007-2012) ====
Sekiguchi made his Super GT debut in 2007, partnering 2002 GT500 champion Akira Iida at Racing Project Bandoh. In just his fifth race at Sportsland Sugo, Sekiguchi drove from behind and passed Shigekazu Wakisaka with just a few laps remaining to take the win. In doing so he became the youngest GT300 class winner at the time, at 19 years, 7 months of age (a record which would be broken in 2008 by Keisuke Kunimoto).

Sekiguchi made a one-off appearance for the Bandoh team during the 2008 Suzuka 1000 km. After returning to Japan, he began driving for Hironori Takeuchi's SHIFT team in mid-2009. He drove for JLOC during the 2010 and 2011 seasons, recording a best finish of third in the 2010 season finale at Motegi.

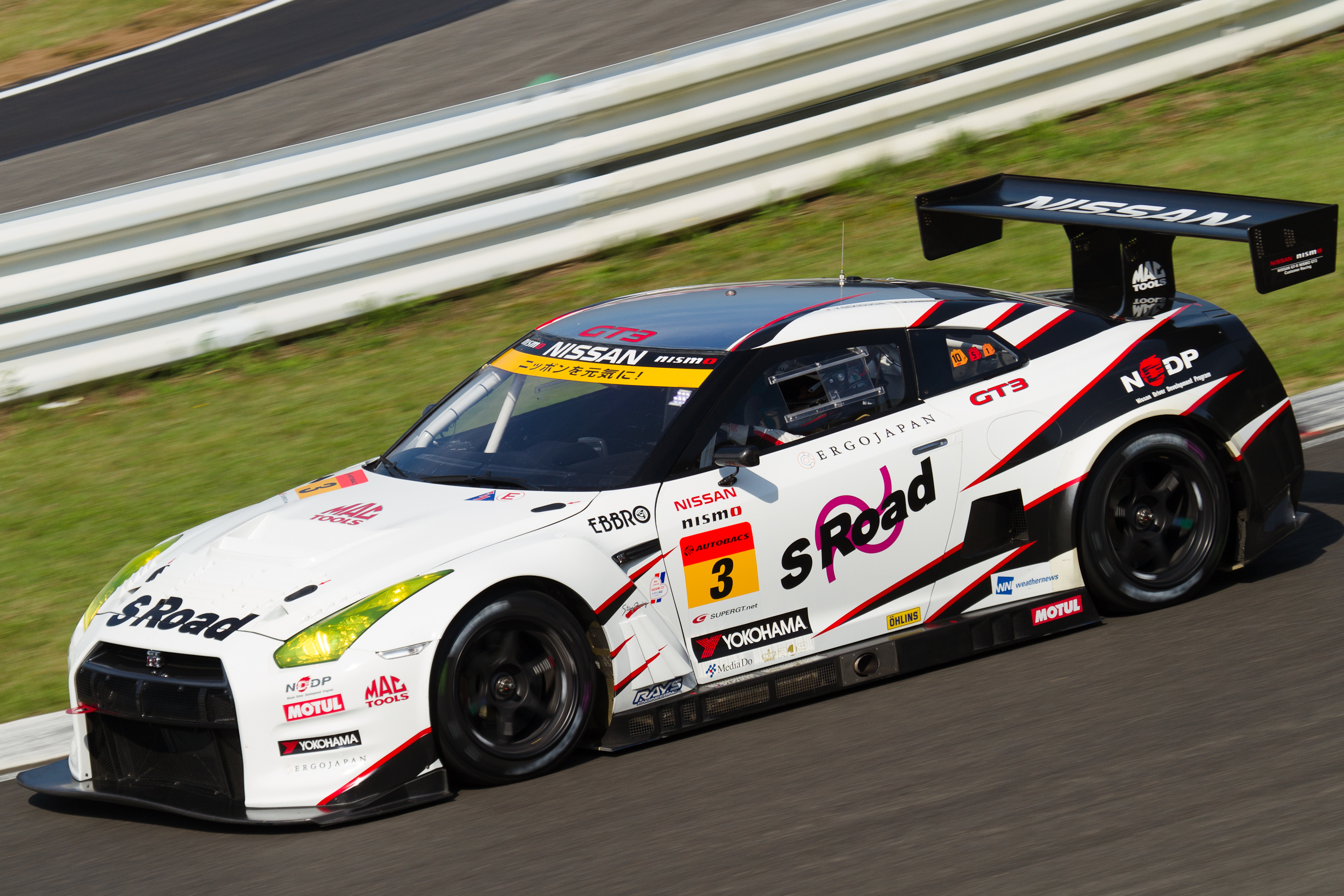
Sekiguchi racing for NDDP in 2012

After winning the All-Japan Formula 3 Championship in 2011, and after a solid performance in that year's Macau Grand Prix, Sekiguchi joined NDDP (Nissan Driver Development Programme) Racing in 2012, driving their new Nissan GT-R NISMO GT3 alongside newcomer Katsumasa Chiyo. Sekiguchi and Chiyo won at Sugo to give the GT-R its first GT300 race win. Sekiguchi would later serve a one-race ban during the September round at Fuji for reaching ten penalty points under the Driving Moral Hazard Prevention System.

==== GT500 (2013-) ====
Sekiguchi made his debut in the GT500 class for the 2013 season, joining the defending series champion MOLA and partnering three-time GT500 champion co-driver Satoshi Motoyama. Sekiguchi led the opening laps of the fourth round at Sugo but would finish seventh after a puncture. Their best finish was fourth at Autopolis.

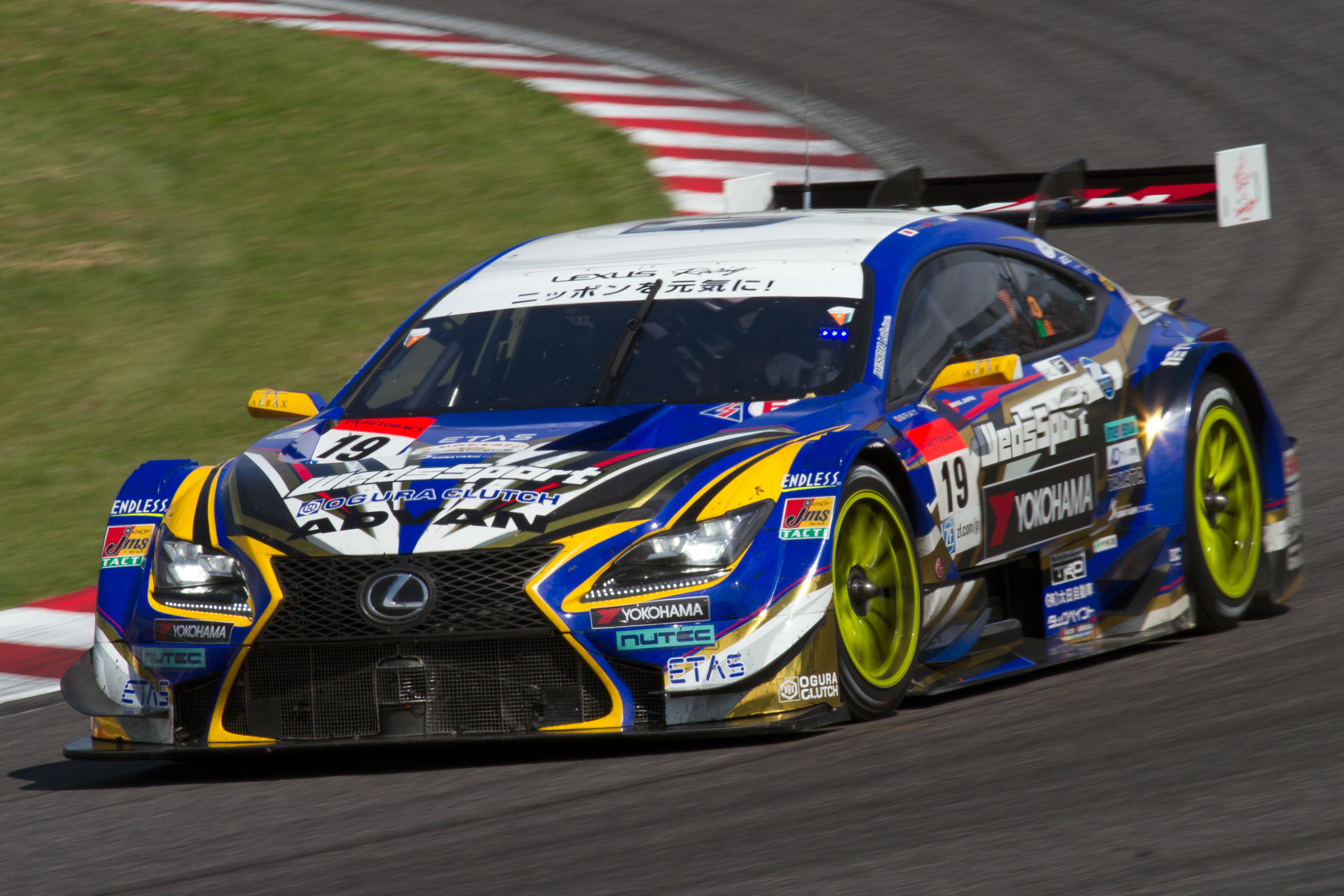
Sekiguchi racing for Racing Project Bandoh in 2014

In 2014, Sekiguchi transferred from Nissan to Lexus and reunited with Racing Project Bandoh, who had made the step up to GT500 in 2011. He drove alongside another three-time GT500 champion, Juichi Wakisaka. Sekiguchi and Wakisaka finished in the points in every race during the 2015 season. Yuji Kunimoto became Sekiguchi's new teammate in 2016 after Wakisaka retired from driving in Super GT during the off-season.

At Buriram International Circuit in Thailand, Sekiguchi and Kunimoto won from pole position. It was Sekiguchi's first career GT500 win and the first GT500 win for the Bandoh team in six years; Racing Project Bandoh would not win again in GT500 until the June 2023 race at Suzuka. Sekiguchi finished every race in the points for the second year in a row, and was fourth in the standings alongside Kunimoto.

Sekiguchi moved to TOM'S Racing in 2018, and won the 2018 Fuji GT 500 Mile Race and 2019 Suzuka round alongside co-driver Kazuki Nakajima. In 2020, he and GT500 newcomer Sacha Fenestraz finished fourth in the championship, driving the new Toyota GR Supra GT500.

For 2021, Sekiguchi was joined by Sho Tsuboi at TOM'S. Sekiguchi and Tsuboi went into the final round at Fuji trailing championship leader Naoki Yamamoto by 16 points. They won the race from fourth on the grid, and after Yamamoto was involved in an accident with Honda GT300 driver Ren Sato, Sekiguchi, Tsuboi, and TOM'S would win the GT500 championship after overcoming the largest point deficit in the final round of the season.

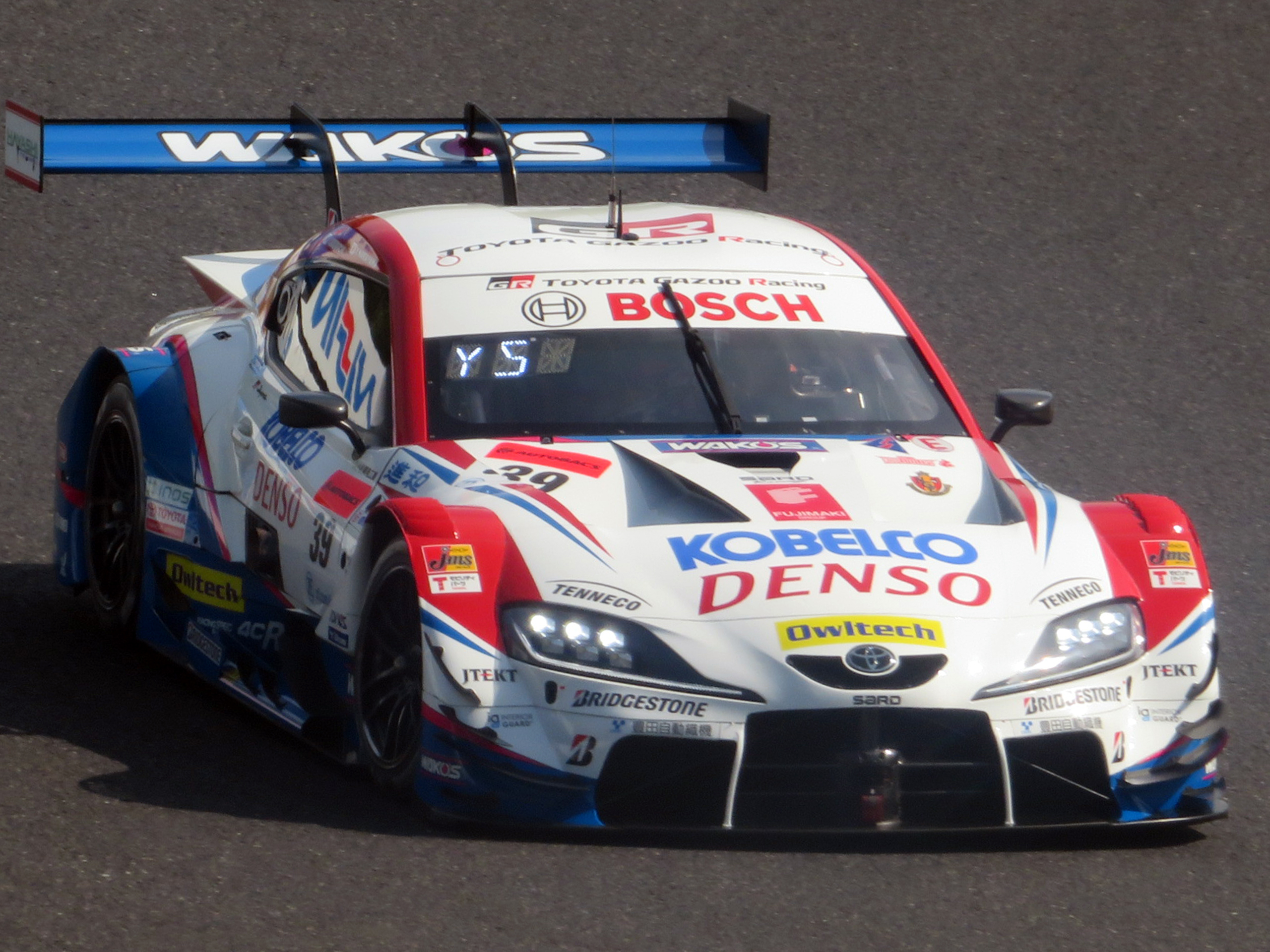
Sekiguchi at 2022 Suzuka GT 300km

Sekiguchi joined TGR Team SARD in 2022, reuniting with his former co-driver Wakisaka, who was now the team director. He and Yuichi Nakayama finished eighth in the standings in 2022, and ninth in the standings in 2023.

=== Super Formula (2016-2023) ===
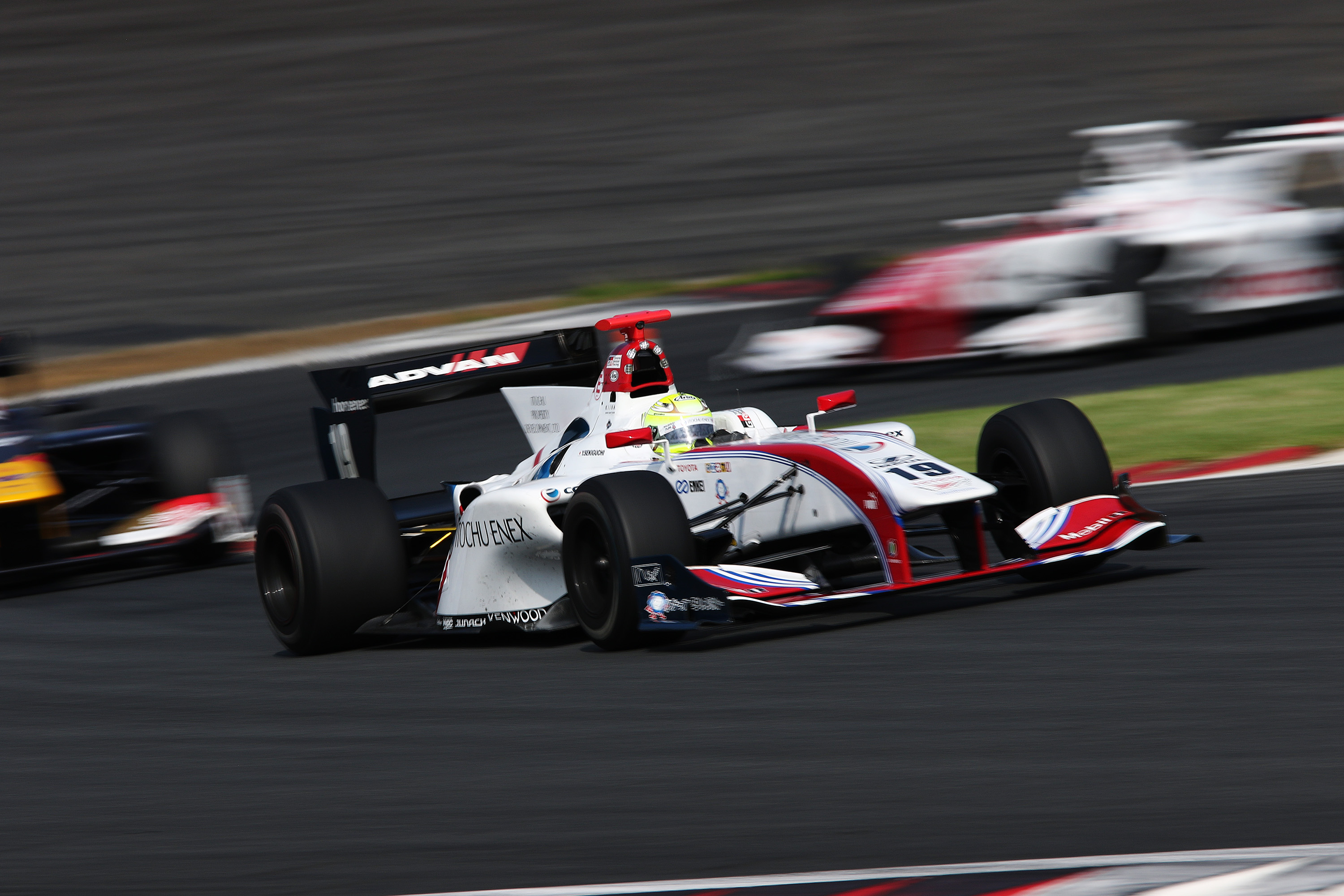
Sekiguchi racing for Team Impul in 2016

Sekiguchi spent eight seasons in the Super Formula Championship with Team Impul. He made his series debut in 2016, as one of two rookies in the field alongside reigning GP2 Series champion Stoffel Vandoorne. He finished third in the 2016 championship with two wins, at Twin Ring Motegi, and at Sportsland Sugo. At Sugo, Sekiguchi won from pole position after building up a 14-second lead when the safety car was deployed following a spin by teammate João Paulo de Oliveira. Once the safety car was withdrawn, Sekiguchi lapped over a second per lap faster than the field to build a 35-second lead before making his pit stop. He left the pits ahead of second-place Daisuke Nakajima and won by over 14 seconds without relinquishing the lead.

Sekiguchi held off another GP2 Series champion and Formula One prospect, Pierre Gasly, by 0.243 seconds to take his second consecutive win at Sugo in 2017. In the 2019 round at Autopolis, he won from 16th on the grid, setting the record for the lowest starting position by a race winner in series history. And in 2022, Sekiguchi fought off team-mate Ryo Hirakawa to win the second race of a double-header at Motegi, for his first victory in over three years, and his last in the series.

Sekiguchi finished as high as third in the championship standings twice, in 2016, and in 2021 when he helped Impul win the Teams' Championship. He was dropped from the Toyota Super Formula roster in 2024 after failing to score any points in the previous season. In total, Sekiguchi recorded seven victories, six pole positions, and 13 podiums in 65 races.

== Racing record ==
=== Career summary ===
Season	Series	Team	Races	Wins	Poles	F/Laps	Podiums	Points	Position
2004	Formula Toyota		10	1	?	?	?	?	3rd
2004	Asian Formula Renault Challenge	Asia Racing Team	2	0	0	0	0	0	NC
2005	Formula Toyota		10	0	0	0	3	68	5th
2005	Asian Formula Renault Challenge	Asia Racing Team	1	0	0	0	0	N/A*	N/P
2006	Formula Challenge Japan		10	3	3	4	7	106	**1st**
2006	Formula Toyota		12	?	8	0	?	155	**1st**
2007	Japanese Formula 3 Championship	Now Motor Sport	20	0	0	0	1	101	7th
2007	Super GT - GT300	Racing Project Bandoh	9	1	0	?	1	32	10th
2008	International Formula Master	Euronova Racing	14	0	0	0	0	12	16th
2008	Formula Master Italia	Euronova Racing	2	1	1	1	1	11	10th
2008	Super GT - GT300	Racing Project Bandoh	1	0	0	1	0	1	31st
2008–09	GP2 Asia Series	DPR	2	0	0	0	0	0	32nd
2009	Japanese Formula 3 Championship - National	AIM Sports	14	3	4	3	5	57	5th
2009	Super GT - GT300	Shift	4	0	0	0	0	3	22nd
2010	Japanese Formula 3 Championship	ThreeBond Racing	16	0	0	3	11	81	**2nd**
2010	Macau Grand Prix	ThreeBond Racing	1	0	0	0	0	N/A	20th
2010	Super GT - GT300	JLOC	7	0	0	0	1	30	9th
2010	JAF GP Nippon Fuji Sprint Cup GT300	JLOC	1	0	0	0	0	N/A	N/P
2011	Japanese Formula 3 Championship	B-Max Engineering	12	6	7	8	10	100	**1st**
2011	Macau Grand Prix	Mücke Motorsport	1	0	0	0	0	N/A	4th
2011	Super GT - GT300	JLOC	4	0	0	1	0	N/A	N/P
2012	Super GT - GT300	NDDP Racing	7	1	0	0	2	51	6th
2013	Macau Grand Prix	Mücke Motorsport	1	0	0	0	0	N/A	11th
2013	Super GT - GT500	MOLA	8	0	1	1	0	28	12th
2013	Japanese Formula 3 Championship	B-Max Engineering	2	0	0	0	1	7	8th
2014	Super GT - GT500	Lexus Team WedsSport BANDOH	8	0	0	0	0	17	15th
2015	Super GT - GT500	Lexus Team WedsSport BANDOH	8	0	0	0	0	27	11th
2015	Japanese Formula 3 Championship	B-Max Engineering	4	0	0	0	0	2	11th
2016	Super GT - GT500	Lexus Team WedsSport BANDOH	8	1	1	0	2	58	4th
2016	Super Formula	Itochu Enex Team Impul	9	2	2	2	3	28.5	**3rd**
2016–17	Asian Le Mans Series - GT	VS Racing	2	0	0	0	0	12	13th
2017	Super GT - GT500	Lexus Team WedsSport BANDOH	8	0	0	0	0	23	12th
2017	Super Formula	Itochu Enex Team Impul	7	2	1	0	3	25	4th
2018	Super GT - GT500	Lexus Team au TOM'S	8	1	0	0	2	55	5th
2018	Super Formula	Itochu Enex Team Impul	6	1	1	0	2	18	4th
2019	Super GT	Lexus Team au TOM's	8	1	2	1	2	38	7th
2019	Super Formula	Itochu Enex Team Impul	7	1	0	1	1	16	8th
2020	Super GT - GT500	TGR Team au TOM'S	8	0	0	0	4	56	4th
2020	Super Formula	Itochu Enex Team Impul	7	0	0	0	1	17	14th
2021	Super GT - GT500	TGR Team au TOM'S	8	1	0	1	3	64	**1st**
2021	Super Formula	Carenex Team Impul	7	0	1	1	2	55	**3rd**
2021	Super Taikyu - ST-Z	B-Max Engineering	3	0	0	0	0	14‡	13th‡
2022	Super GT - GT500	TGR Team SARD	8	0	0	0	1	33	8th
2022	Super Formula	Carenex Team Impul	10	1	1	2	1	43	7th
2022	Super Taikyu - ST-Q	ORC ROOKIE Racing						0‡	NC‡
2022	Super Taikyu - ST-5	Love Drive Racing	1	0	0	0	0	22.5‡	10th‡
2023	Super GT - GT500	TGR Team SARD	8	0	0	0	2	38	9th
2023	Super Formula	Itochu Enex Team Impul	9	0	0	1	0	0	21st
2023	Super Taikyu - ST-Q	ORC ROOKIE Racing						0‡	NC‡
2024	Super GT - GT500	TGR Team SARD	8	1	0	1	2	46	7th
2024	Super Taikyu - ST-Q	GR Spirit	1	1	1	0	1	0‡	NC‡
2024	Super Formula	Kids com Team KCMG	Reserve driver						
2025	Super GT - GT500	TGR Team SARD	8	0	0	1	2	52	5th
2025	Super Formula	Kids com Team KCMG	Reserve driver						
2026	Super GT - GT500	TGR Team SARD	8	0	0	0	1	44	8th

- † - As Sekiguchi was a guest driver, he was ineligible for points.
- ‡ - Team standings

=== Complete Japanese Formula 3 results ===
(key) (Races in bold indicate pole position) (Races in italics indicate fastest lap)

Year	Team	Engine	Class	1	2	3	4	5	6	7	8	9	10	11	12	13	14	15	16	17	18	19	20	DC	Pts
2007	Now Motor Sports	Toyota		FUJ; 1; 5	FUJ; 2; 9	SUZ; 1; 6	SUZ; 2; 7	MOT; 1; 7	MOT; 2; 7	OKA; 1; 6	OKA; 2; 6	SUZ; 1; 7	SUZ; 2; 5	AUT; 1; 7	AUT; 2; 6	AUT; 3; 5	FUJ; 1; 8	FUJ; 2; 12	SEN; 1 Ret	SEN; 2; 6	SEN; 3; 5	MOT; 1; 7	MOT; 2; 2	7th	101
2009	Aim Sports	Toyota	N	**FUJ**; **1**; 8	**FUJ**; **2**; 7	OKA; 1; 3	**OKA**; **2**; 5	SUZ; 1; 12	SUZ; 2; 14	FUJ; 1; 15	FUJ; 2 Ret	SUZ; 1; 11	SUZ; 2; 12	MOT; 1; 10	**MOT**; **2**; 12	AUT; 1 Ret	AUT; 2; 12	SUG; 1	SUG; 2					5th	57
2010	ThreeBond Racing	Nissan		SUZ; 1; 5	SUZ; 2; 4	MOT; 1; 2	MOT; 2; 3	FUJ; 1; 2	FUJ; 2; 3	FUJ; 1; 2	FUJ; 2; 4	MOT; 1; 2	MOT; 2; 2	OKA; 1; 3	OKA; 2; 2	SUG; 1 Ret	SUG; 2; 11	AUT; 1; 3	AUT; 2; 2					2nd	81
2011	B-MAX Engineering	Toyota		SUZ; 1	SUZ; 2	FUJ; 1; 1	FUJ; 2; 3	FUJ; 3; 12	**FUJ**; **1**; 1	**FUJ**; **2**; 7	**MOT**; **1**; 1	**MOT**; **2**; 1	**OKA**; **1**; 2	**OKA**; **2**; 3	SUZ; 1 C	SUZ; 2 C	SUG; 1; 3	**SUG**; **2**; 1	SUG; 3; 1					1st	100
2013	B-MAX Engineering	Toyota		SUZ; 1	SUZ; 2	MOT; 1	MOT; 2	MOT; 3	OKA; 1	OKA; 2	FUJ; 1	FUJ; 2	MOT; 1	MOT; 2	SUG; 1	SUG; 2	FUJ; 1; 5	FUJ; 2; 3						8th	7
2015	B-MAX Engineering	Toyota		SUZ; 1	SUZ; 2	MOT; 1	MOT; 2	MOT; 3	OKA; 1	OKA; 2	FUJ; 1	FUJ; 2	OKA; 1	OKA; 2	FUJ; 1	FUJ; 2	MOT; 1; 5	MOT; 2 Ret	SUG; 1; 7	SUG; 2; 9				11th	2

=== Complete Super GT results ===
(key) (Races in bold indicate pole position) (Races in italics indicate fastest lap)

Year	Team	Car	Class	1	2	3	4	5	6	7	8	9	DC	Pts
2007	Racing Project Bandoh	Toyota Celica	GT300	SUZ; 14	OKA; 19	FUJ; Ret	SEP; 9	SUG; 1	SUZ; 12	MOT; 18	AUT; 4	FUJ; 16	10th	32
2009	Shift	Lexus IS350	GT300	OKA	SUZ	FUJ	SEP	SUG	SUZ; 9	FUJ; 13	AUT; 13	MOT; 10	22nd	3
2010	JLOC	Lamborghini Gallardo	GT300	SUZ; 7	OKA; 4	FUJ; 16	SEP; 15	SUG; 10	SUZ; 5	FUJ; C	MOT; 3		9th	30
2011	JLOC	Lamborghini Gallardo	GT300	OKA; Ret	FUJ; 8	SEP; 4	SUG; 10	SUZ; 15	FUJ; 4	AUT; 12	MOT; 5		13th	26
2012	NDDP Racing	Nissan GT-R GT3	GT300	OKA; 19	FUJ; 18	SEP; 4	SUG; 1	SUZ; 2	FUJ	AUT; 19	MOT; 6		6th	51
2013	MOLA	Nissan GT-R	GT500	OKA; 10	FUJ; 9	SEP; 6	**SUG**; 7	SUZ; 8	FUJ; 7	AUT; 4	MOT; 14		12th	28
2014	Lexus Team WedsSport BANDOH	Lexus RC F	GT500	OKA; 11	FUJ; 7	AUT; 8	SUG; 12	FUJ; 11	SUZ; Ret	BUR; 6	MOT; 6		15th	17
2015	Lexus Team WedsSport BANDOH	Lexus RC F	GT500	OKA; 10	FUJ; 7	CHA; 9	FUJ; 10	SUZ; 4	SUG; 5	AUT; 9	MOT; 10		11th	27
2016	Lexus Team WedsSport BANDOH	Lexus RC F	GT500	OKA; 9	FUJ; 8	SUG; 5	FUJ; 10	SUZ; 5	**CHA**; 1	MOT; 5	MOT; 3		4th	58
2017	Lexus Team WedsSport BANDOH	Lexus LC 500	GT500	OKA; 6	FUJ; 10	AUT; 8	SUG; 12	FUJ; 7	SUZ; 4	CHA; 12	MOT; 15		12th	23
2018	Lexus Team au TOM'S	Lexus LC 500	GT500	OKA; 13	FUJ; 4	SUZ; 5	CHA; 10	FUJ; 1	SUG; 12	AUT; 2	MOT; 13		5th	55
2019	Lexus Team au TOM'S	Lexus LC 500	GT500	OKA; 9‡	FUJ; Ret	**SUZ**; 1	CHA; 9	FUJ; Ret	AUT; 10	SUG; 10	**MOT**; 3		7th	38
2020	TGR Team au TOM'S	Toyota GR Supra GT500	GT500	FUJ; 2	FUJ; 2	SUZ; 3	MOT; 11	FUJ; 12	SUZ; 7	MOT; 13	FUJ; 3		4th	56
2021	TGR Team au TOM'S	Toyota GR Supra GT500	GT500	OKA; 2	FUJ; 13	MOT; 3	SUZ; 5	SUG; 4	AUT; 10	MOT; 8	FUJ; 1		1st	64
2022	TGR Team SARD	Toyota GR Supra GT500	GT500	OKA; 8	FUJ; 13	SUZ; 4	FUJ; 6	SUZ; 3	SUG; 6	AUT; 10	MOT; Ret		8th	33
2023	TGR Team SARD	Toyota GR Supra GT500	GT500	OKA; 8	FUJ; 8	SUZ; 15	FUJ; 9	SUZ; 2	SUG; 3	AUT; 14	MOT; 7		9th	38
2024	TGR Team SARD	Toyota GR Supra GT500	GT500	OKA; 2^{2}	FUJ; 9	SUZ; 11	FUJ; 15	SUG; 1	AUT; 5	MOT; 10	SUZ; 11		7th	46
2025	TGR Team SARD	Toyota GR Supra GT500	GT500	OKA; 3	FUJ; 5	SEP; 14	FS1; 5	FS2 (4)	SUZ; 6	SUG; 2	AUT; 12	MOT; 4	5th	52
2026	TGR Team SARD	Toyota GR Supra GT500	GT500	OKA; 5	FUJ; 4	FUJ; 8	SUZ; Ret	SUG; 2	AUT; 7	MOT; 4	MOT; DSQ		8th	44

^{‡} Half points awarded as less than 75% of race distance was completed.
^{(Number)} Driver did not take part in this sprint race, points are still awarded for the teammate's result.
^{*} Season still in progress.

=== Complete Super Formula results ===
(Races in bold indicate pole position)

Year	Team	Engine	1	2	3	4	5	6	7	8	9	10	DC	Points
2016	Itochu Enex Team Impul	Toyota	SUZ; 14	OKA; 13	FUJ; 3	**MOT**; 1	OKA; 13	OKA; 9	**SUG**; 1	SUZ; 18	SUZ; 8		3rd	28.5
2017	Itochu Enex Team Impul	Toyota	SUZ; 12	**OKA**; 2	OKA; 1	FUJ; 4	MOT; 16	AUT; 10	SUG; 1	SUZ; C	SUZ; C		4th	25
2018	Itochu Enex Team Impul	Toyota	SUZ; 2	AUT; C	**SUG**; 13	FUJ; 6	MOT; 16	OKA; 1	SUZ; 8				4th	18
2019	Itochu Enex Team Impul	Toyota	SUZ; Ret	AUT; 1	SUG; 10	FUJ; 8	MOT; 15	OKA; 13	SUZ; 4				8th	16
2020	Itochu Enex Team Impul	Toyota	MOT; Ret	OKA; 5	SUG; 11	AUT; 11	SUZ; DNS	SUZ; 3	FUJ; DNS				14th	17
2021	carenex Team Impul	Toyota	FUJ; 17†	SUZ1; 4	AUT; 10	**SUG**; 3	MOT1; 2	MOT2; 4	SUZ2; 4				3rd	55
2022	carenex Team Impul	Toyota	FUJ; 4	FUJ; 6	SUZ; 11	AUT; 16	SUG; 15	**FUJ**; Ret^{1}	MOT; 9	MOT; 1	SUZ; 6	SUZ; 11	7th	43
2023	Itochu Enex Team Impul	Toyota	FUJ; 11	FUJ; 13	SUZ; 19	AUT; 18	SUG; Ret	FUJ; 20	MOT; Ret	SUZ; 12	SUZ; 16		21st	0

^{*} Season still in progress.

Sporting positions
Preceded by Inaugural	Formula Challenge Japan; Champion; 2006	Succeeded by Keisuke Kunimoto
Preceded by Kazuya Oshima	Formula Toyota; Champion; 2006	Succeeded by Kei Cozzolino
Preceded by Yuji Kunimoto	Japanese Formula 3 Championship; Champion; 2011	Succeeded by Ryo Hirakawa
Preceded by Naoki Yamamoto; Tadasuke Makino	Super GT; GT500 Champion; 2021; With: Sho Tsuboi	Succeeded by Bertrand Baguette; Kazuki Hiramine
