= 2010 Macau Grand Prix =

Formula Three motor race

Race details
Date	November 21, 2010
Official name	57th Macau Grand Prix
Location	Guia Circuit, Macau
Course	Temporary street circuit 6.120 km (3.803 mi)
Distance	Qualifying Race; 10 laps, 61.200 km (38.028 mi); Main Race; 15 laps, 91.800 km (57.042 mi)
Weather	Qualifying Race: Sunny; air 23 °C (73 °F), track 35 °C (95 °F); Main Race: Sunny; air 24 °C (75 °F), track 29 °C (84 °F)
- Qualifying Race

Pole
Driver	(Italy) Edoardo Mortara	Signature
Time	2:11.165

Fastest Lap
Driver	(Belgium) Laurens Vanthoor	Signature
Time	2:11.934 (on lap 4)

Podium
First	(Italy) Edoardo Mortara	Signature
Second	(Belgium) Laurens Vanthoor	Signature
Third	(Germany) Daniel Abt	Signature
- Main Race

Pole
Driver	(Italy) Edoardo Mortara	Signature

Fastest Lap
Driver	(Italy) Edoardo Mortara	Signature
Time	2:11.480 (on lap 11)

Podium
First	(Italy) Edoardo Mortara	Signature
Second	(Belgium) Laurens Vanthoor	Signature
Third	(Finland) Valtteri Bottas	Prema Powerteam

The 2010 Macau Grand Prix Formula Three was the 57th Macau Grand Prix race to be held on the streets of Macau. It was held on 21 November 2010, and was the 28th edition for Formula Three cars. The race was supported by the 2010 Guia Race of Macau, the final round of the World Touring Car Championship season.

Having already claimed pole position and the qualifying race, Signature driver Edoardo Mortara became the first driver to win back-to-back Formula Three Grands Prix, finishing ahead of teammate Laurens Vanthoor, with Valtteri Bottas third for Prema Powerteam.

== Entry list ==
- All drivers competed in Dallara F308 chassis.

2010 Entry List
Team	No	Driver	Engine	Main series
(France) Signature	1	(Italy) Edoardo Mortara	Volkswagen	Formula 3 Euro Series
(France) Signature	2	(Germany) Marco Wittmann	Volkswagen	Formula 3 Euro Series
(France) Signature	3	(Belgium) Laurens Vanthoor	Volkswagen	Formula 3 Euro Series
(France) Signature	4	(Germany) Daniel Abt	Volkswagen	German Formula Three
(United Kingdom) Carlin	5	(France) Jean-Éric Vergne	Volkswagen	British Formula 3
(United Kingdom) Carlin	6	(United Kingdom) James Calado	Volkswagen	British Formula 3
(United Kingdom) Carlin	7	(Malaysia) Jazeman Jaafar	Volkswagen	British Formula 3
(United Kingdom) Carlin	8	(Portugal) António Félix da Costa	Volkswagen	Formula 3 Euro Series
(Japan) TOM'S	9	(Japan) Yuji Kunimoto	Toyota-TOM'S	All-Japan Formula Three
(Japan) TOM'S	10	(Brazil) Rafael Suzuki	Toyota-TOM'S	All-Japan Formula Three
(United Kingdom) Räikkönen Robertson Racing	11	(United Kingdom) Alexander Sims	Mercedes HWA	Formula 3 Euro Series
(United Kingdom) Räikkönen Robertson Racing	12	(Brazil) Felipe Nasr	Mercedes HWA	British Formula 3
(United Kingdom) Räikkönen Robertson Racing	13	(Macau) Michael Ho	Mercedes HWA	European F3 Open
(United Kingdom) Räikkönen Robertson Racing	14	(Indonesia) Rio Haryanto	Mercedes HWA	GP3 Series
(Italy) Prema Powerteam	15	(Spain) Daniel Juncadella	Mercedes HWA	Formula 3 Euro Series
(Italy) Prema Powerteam	16	(Spain) Roberto Merhi	Mercedes HWA	Formula 3 Euro Series
(Italy) Prema Powerteam	28	(Finland) Valtteri Bottas	Mercedes HWA	Formula 3 Euro Series
(United Kingdom) Fortec Motorsport	17	(United Kingdom) Oliver Webb	Mercedes HWA	British Formula 3
(United Kingdom) Fortec Motorsport	18	(United Kingdom) William Buller	Mercedes HWA	British Formula 3
(United Kingdom) Fortec Motorsport	19	(Brazil) Lucas Foresti	Mercedes HWA	British Formula 3
(Japan) Toda Racing/KCMG	20	(Switzerland) Alexandre Imperatori	Honda-Toda	All-Japan Formula Three
(Japan) ThreeBond Racing	21	(Japan) Yuhi Sekiguchi	Nissan	All-Japan Formula Three
(Japan) Hanashima Racing	22	(Japan) Hideki Yamauchi	Toyota	All-Japan Formula Three
(United Kingdom) Hitech Racing	23	(Colombia) Carlos Huertas	Volkswagen	British Formula 3
(United Kingdom) Hitech Racing	24	(Colombia) Carlos Muñoz	Volkswagen	Formula 3 Euro Series
(Germany) Motopark Academy	26	(Netherlands) Renger van der Zande	Volkswagen	GP3 Series
(Germany) Motopark Academy	27	(Japan) Kimiya Sato	Volkswagen	All-Japan Formula Three
(United Kingdom) Sino Vision Racing	29	(Hong Kong) Adderly Fong	Mercedes HWA	British Formula 3
(United Kingdom) CF Racing/Manor Motorsport	30	(United Kingdom) Hywel Lloyd	Mercedes HWA	British Formula 3
(Sweden) Performance Racing	32	(Sweden) Felix Rosenqvist	Volkswagen	German Formula Three

== Report ==
=== Practice and qualifying ===
Valtteri Bottas set the fastest time in the first half-hour free practice session that was held prior to the first qualifying session, but he and defending race-winner Edoardo Mortara were split by just 0.01 seconds. Mortara's teammate Laurens Vanthoor completed the session in third place, marginally faster than Bottas' teammate Roberto Merhi, with Carlos Huertas completing the top five, just over a second off the pace. Renger van der Zande rounded out the top six, in a crash-filled session with four drivers – Daniel Abt, Felix Rosenqvist, Rio Haryanto and Kimiya Sato – hitting the wall, with William Buller and Michael Ho also having excursions down escape roads.

"It feels really good. Every time in the past I have missed pole position and now we have finally done it. But I feel pretty lucky compared to Valtteri because he was slightly faster than me, and it was a big, big challenge. I was pushing with all I've got and struggling quite a lot with the car, especially in the mountain section. That is normally where we're pretty fast compared to the others, but this time we are struggling a little bit. I think we just need to set up the car a little bit better. But I'm really happy for everybody, Volkswagen, and the Signature team. They gave me a really good car here and I'm able to show what I'm capable of at this track. In F3 and in all other races there have been many crashes. I think the condition of the track is really slippery so it's very easy to make mistakes. To be on the edge and to drive at the limit in these conditions is really tricky. You just put a wheel outside of the good line and you're off. I knew there were so many red flags, which means you need to perform well in the first lap you've got that's free. We're lucky we have the #1 on the car, so we can start first, pull away from the others and not have to worry about their cars."

— Edoardo Mortara, after taking pole position, and his chances of becoming the first repeat winner of the race under Formula Three regulations.

The first qualifying session saw Mortara on top, reversing the result from the practice session as Bottas wound up second. Mortara only secured the top spot, after a late crash by Carlin's Jazeman Jaafar at Fishermen's Bend, which stopped the other drivers from improving their times. Marco Wittmann was top rookie as he ended up third ahead of Vanthoor and Huertas. Van der Zande finished the session in sixth place ahead of rookies Felipe Nasr and James Calado with Alexandre Imperatori and Abt rounding out the top ten. Fortec Motorsport and Carlin provisionally filled the next two rows with Oliver Webb getting the better of one of his rivals from the British Formula 3 season, Jean-Éric Vergne, with Buller and António Félix da Costa filling row seven. Japanese trio Yuhi Sekiguchi, Hideki Yamauchi and Yuji Kunimoto were next up ahead of Formula 3 Euro Series runners Alexander Sims and Merhi. Jaafar ended the session in 20th after his late incident, ahead of Haryanto, Lucas Foresti, Hywel Lloyd, Sato, Rosenqvist, Rafael Suzuki, Adderly Fong, Daniel Juncadella – who also crashed at Fishermen's – and Ho. Carlos Muñoz had set the 26th-fastest time but was excluded from the session for missing the weighbridge. Muñoz was also among eight drivers to receive a five-place grid penalty for the qualification race by ignoring yellow flags, as well as Calado, Sekiguchi, Buller, Foresti, Webb, Yamauchi and Huertas.

In second practice, which had been reduced to a half-hour session from 45 minutes, Bottas and Mortara fought for the top spot again, with Bottas coming out on top by six tenths of a second with his final lap of the session. Wittmann, Huertas and Merhi filled out the rest of the top five, the only other drivers to be within two seconds of the pace set by Bottas. Setting the theme of a crash-filled day on the streets of Macau, Calado and Buller crashed at Fishermen's, Muñoz at Police, while Haryanto brought out a red flag for crashing at the tricky final corner, R Bend. Delays caused after the session in support races and in the WTCC qualifying session meant that the second qualifying session scheduled for Friday afternoon was moved to Saturday morning.

"That session was a mess in the beginning with the red flags. I really didn't get any laps in and then, after I was going for a good lap, in one corner I touched a wall slightly and got a puncture. At the next corner I ran wide, hit the wall and broke the car a little bit. I came in and the steering was not straight, but I still managed to set a time like this. It would be nice to be on pole position, but everything is still open with the race today. Like we saw last year, Edoardo was not on pole position but he won the race on Sunday. We have a good car and I'm confident that we are going to be fight for the win. Everything is still open and anything can happen."

— Valtteri Bottas finished second in both qualifying sessions, despite damaging his Dallara early on Saturday.

When second qualifying finally did take place, Mortara set the pace again before the first of two red flags for Fong hitting the wall at the Solitude Esses. Mortara's teammate Vanthoor then usurped his time before the second red flag for Kunimoto hitting the wall, again at Solitude. With eight minutes remaining in the session, Mortara then returned to the top of the standings, having improved on his Thursday time by nearly two seconds. Signature had a 1-2-3-4 clean sweep until the last lap of the session when Bottas found a clear run to vault his way back into second. Vanthoor and Abt moved ahead of Wittmann with Merhi moving up to sixth. After Huertas' penalty, Rosenqvist, van der Zande, Juncadella, Vergne and Félix da Costa all moved up on the grid. Sims was also penalised ten places on the grid for an engine change dropping him to 20th on the grid. The rest of the grid lined up as Jaafar, Lloyd, Nasr, Imperatori, Suzuki, Calado, Webb, Sims and Muñoz (after penalties), Haryanto, Foresti, Kunimoto, Sato, Ho, Sekiguchi, Buller, Yamauchi and Fong. As well as the red flag-causing incidents, Vergne, Buller, Webb and Félix da Costa also hit the barriers.

=== Qualification Race ===
At the start, Mortara and Bottas made similar starts but behind them, Abt made the best start and went three-wide with Mortara and Bottas on the run to the Mandarin and took the lead on the exit. Mortara regained the tow behind his teammate and reclaimed the lead into Lisboa. Behind the leaders, Nasr ran wide and almost hit the wall on the outside of the bend but Calado lost rear grip on his car and spun into the barriers. As he came back across the circuit, Sims spun to avoid him and also hit the barriers, but on the inside. Further down the road, Webb ran into the barriers at Lisboa and became the race's third retirement. Despite extensive debris, the race continued under green flag conditions.

"I think it is going to be pretty intense. Edoardo is favourite as he won last year – so I need to beat him and I want to win. I will do my best and give it all I have got to see where we end up. Macau is always a very tricky race, and lots can happen with safety cars and crashes. So we will see what happens. I will do my best and see where we finish. It was a pretty exciting race. My start was not too bad but I was blocked behind Wittmann and I couldn't go anywhere at the first corner. I had an interesting battle with my team-mate Dan, which was quite fun. After I got past I tried to push for some laps to make a gap, but then I took it safe until the end because for the qualification race it is important to finish. I was feeling good. I wasn't really pushing hard – so it's all good for tomorrow."

— Laurens Vanthoor set fastest lap of the race en route to second place, and his thoughts about winning the main race.

With Abt, Bottas and Vanthoor battling over second place, Mortara extended a margin out front of over two seconds after the first lap. Abt defended second place on lap two, but on the run to Lisboa on lap three, Vanthoor, having passed Bottas the previous lap drafted past his teammate and into second place. Lloyd departed the race on lap two, becoming the fourth of the five British drivers to retire from the race. Bottas' teammate Merhi soon caught up to the pack and moved ahead of the Zandvoort Masters winner and into fourth place. With three laps to go, Merhi moved into third ahead of Abt but soon developed a problem, which saw him outbraked by both Abt and Bottas at Lisboa on lap nine, and later fell down the order to an eventual 22nd place classification. On the same lap as Merhi moved into third, Imperatori also exited the race at Lisboa and became the final retirement of the race.

Mortara's pace dropped towards the end but he was still over two seconds clear of Vanthoor at the race's conclusion. Abt completed the podium, giving Signature a clean sweep. Bottas finished fourth ahead of Wittmann, van der Zande, Vergne, Huertas, Félix da Costa and Juncadella. Outside the top ten, Rosenqvist finished eleventh ahead of Nasr, Jaafar, Haryanto, Foresti, Muñoz, Kunimoto, Suzuki, Buller, Sekiguchi, Yamauchi, Merhi, Fong, Ho and Sato rounded out the 25 classified finishers.

=== Main Race ===
At the start, the Signature cars of Mortara, Vanthoor and Abt all made decent getaways while chaos ensued in the midfield. Muñoz ran into the back of the stalled Haryanto, and both those drivers were out on the spot. Muñoz's crabbed Dallara also took out two further Räikkönen Robertson Racing cars as Sims, starting last after his crash at the Mandarin on Saturday, rammed into the back of Ho and both drivers were out as they could not separate themselves. Sato also picked up damage and pitted at the end of the lap. Mortara held the lead into Lisboa ahead of Abt, Vanthoor, Bottas, Wittmann and van der Zande. Vergne and Juncadella also battled over eighth position at the corner, with Juncadella ending up in the barrier after running wide. Unsurprisingly, the safety car was deployed to clean the circuit, but the debris was quickly removed and by the end of the next lap, the safety car pulled in.

"It's a great feeling and a great honour for me to be in the history books. We don't have to forget that every year, it's a tough competition. This year it was a big fight too. I had a tough challenge today, and the previous days, from Valtteri [Bottas] and Laurens. We were pushing really hard and I was really pushing hard. It was really tough for me. I have pretty big experience here, and on the straight if you don't have a big, big gap with the people who are behind you, there's a strong chance they are going to get past you. I thought I had done enough but unfortunately that wasn't the case and they just overtook me at the end of the straight. It was the same for Laurens. He was in front, he did a great restart at the beginning and then he was also in that position and I could overtake him. Then it was a matter really to push as hard as you can, even more than in qualifying, to build a gap so it is more difficult for the people who are following you. That is what I did today. I pushed and in every corner I almost touched the walls – but I managed it."

— Edoardo Mortara, after becoming the first driver in 30 years – and the first driver in the Formula Three era – to win consecutive Grands Prix in Macau.

Racing resumed with Mortara making a sluggish restart allowing both Abt and Vanthoor to attack for the lead down to Lisboa, running three-wide at one point. Abt made the best move to the inside and took the lead of the race. Ultimately, it was to be a short run out front for Abt, as later on the lap, he hit the barriers at the Solitude Esses and was lucky not to be collected by Vanthoor, or any other drivers as his car skated along the wall on the tight, upper portion of the circuit. The safety car was called upon with Vanthoor now out front with Mortara, Bottas, Wittmann and Félix da Costa, who had passed van der Zande before the safety car was redeployed early on lap four. The safety car pitted at the end of lap six after a period to clear Abt's car from the track.

Mortara's pace picked up and he made short work of Vanthoor, taking the lead at Lisboa, and would not be headed again as he became the first driver to win consecutive Formula Three Macau Grands Prix. Vanthoor held second to the end, holding off increasing pressure from Bottas, but due to a lack of straight-line speed down to his less-powerful Mercedes engine, Bottas could not stay with Vanthoor and thus negated a chance to pass. Wittmann ran a lonely race to fourth ahead of van der Zande, who repassed Félix da Costa on lap eleven. Vergne was seventh ahead of Merhi, who avoided the start-line shunt to move up from 22nd to eighth, with the top ten rounded out by Rosenqvist and Huertas. Outside the top ten, Nasr finished eleventh ahead of Imperatori, who also moved up fourteen from his start position, Yamauchi was 13th ahead of Jaafar, Buller, Kunimoto, Suzuki, Webb, Calado, Sekiguchi, Fong, Foresti, Lloyd and Sato rounded out the 24 classified finishers.

== Classification ==
=== Qualifying ===
- Qualifying was split into two sessions, both of which being 45 minutes. One session was held on November 18 and another was held on November 20, with the best times of each driver counting towards the grid for the qualifying race.

Pos	No	Driver	Team	Q1 Time	Rank	Q2 Time	Rank	Gap	Grid
1	1	(Italy) Edoardo Mortara	Signature	2:13.068	1	2:11.165	1		1
2	28	(Finland) Valtteri Bottas	Prema Powerteam	2:13.181	2	2:11.383	2	+ 0.218	2
3	3	(Belgium) Laurens Vanthoor	Signature	2:13.925	4	2:11.594	3	+ 0.429	3
4	4	(Germany) Daniel Abt	Signature	2:14.512	10	2:11.919	4	+ 0.754	4
5	2	(Germany) Marco Wittmann	Signature	2:13.593	3	2:11.937	5	+ 0.772	5
6	16	(Spain) Roberto Merhi	Prema Powerteam	2:15.505	19	2:12.063	6	+ 0.898	6
7	23	(Colombia) Carlos Huertas	Hitech Racing	2:14.043	5	2:12.543	7	+ 1.378	12^{1}
8	32	(Sweden) Felix Rosenqvist	Performance Racing	2:16.889	25	2:12.664	8	+ 1.499	7
9	26	(Netherlands) Renger van der Zande	Motopark Academy	2:14.062	6	2:12.682	9	+ 1.517	8
10	15	(Spain) Daniel Juncadella	Prema Powerteam	2:20.892	28	2:12.861	10	+ 1.696	9
11	5	(France) Jean-Éric Vergne	Carlin	2:14.751	12	2:13.042	11	+ 1.877	10
12	11	(United Kingdom) Alexander Sims	Räikkönen Robertson Racing	2:15.350	18	2:13.261	12	+ 2.096	20^{2}
13	8	(Portugal) António Félix da Costa	Carlin	2:15.019	14	2:13.511	13	+ 2.346	11
14	7	(Malaysia) Jazeman Jaafar	Carlin	2:16.124	20	2:13.520	14	+ 2.355	13
15	30	(United Kingdom) Hywel Lloyd	CF Racing/Manor Motorsport	2:16.695	23	2:13.536	15	+ 2.371	14
16	12	(Brazil) Felipe Nasr	Räikkönen Robertson Racing	2:14.217	7	2:13.576	16	+ 2.411	15
17	6	(United Kingdom) James Calado	Carlin	2:14.266	8	2:13.609	17	+ 2.444	18^{1}
18	17	(United Kingdom) Oliver Webb	Fortec Motorsport	2:14.666	11	2:13.651	18	+ 2.486	19^{1}
19	20	(Switzerland) Alexandre Imperatori	Toda Racing/KCMG	2:14.315	9	2:13.752	19	+ 2.587	16
20	24	(Colombia) Carlos Muñoz	Hitech Racing	no time^{3}	30	2:14.660	20	+ 3.495	21^{1}
21	10	(Brazil) Rafael Suzuki	TOM'S	2:18.459	26	2:14.733	21	+ 3.568	17
22	19	(Brazil) Lucas Foresti	Fortec Motorsport	2:16.358	22	2:14.743	22	+ 3.578	23^{1}
23	21	(Japan) Yuhi Sekiguchi	ThreeBond Racing	2:15.128	15	2:14.826	23	+ 3.661	27^{1}
24	18	(United Kingdom) William Buller	Fortec Motorsport	2:14.855	13	2:20.368	29	+ 3.690	28^{1}
25	14	(Indonesia) Rio Haryanto	Räikkönen Robertson Racing	2:16.139	21	2:14.860	24	+ 3.695	22
26	22	(Japan) Hideki Yamauchi	Hanashima Racing	2:15.209	16	2:18.456	27	+ 4.044	29^{1}
27	9	(Japan) Yuji Kunimoto	TOM'S	2:15.338	17	2:18.473	28	+ 4.173	24
28	27	(Japan) Kimiya Sato	Motopark Academy	2:16.884	24	2:15.671	25	+ 4.506	25
29	13	(Macau) Michael Ho	Räikkönen Robertson Racing	2:22.672	29	2:16.314	26	+ 5.149	26
30	29	(Hong Kong) Adderly Fong	Sino Vision Racing	2:18.942	27	13:45.579	30	+ 7.777	30
110% qualifying time: 2:24.281
Bold time indicates the faster of the two times that determined the grid order.

1. – Eight drivers were given five-place grid penalties for the qualification race, for breaching yellow flag regulations.
2. – Sims was penalised ten places for an engine change.
3. – Muñoz's times from the first session were annulled for ignoring the weighbridge during the session.

=== Qualification Race ===
Pos	No	Driver	Team	Laps	Time/Retired	Grid
1	1	(Italy) Edoardo Mortara	Signature	10	22:14.842	1
2	3	(Belgium) Laurens Vanthoor	Signature	10	+ 2.342	3
3	4	(Germany) Daniel Abt	Signature	10	+ 9.414	4
4	28	(Finland) Valtteri Bottas	Prema Powerteam	10	+ 9.647	2
5	2	(Germany) Marco Wittmann	Signature	10	+ 18.766	5
6	26	(Netherlands) Renger van der Zande	Motopark Academy	10	+ 20.001	8
7	5	(France) Jean-Éric Vergne	Carlin	10	+ 20.709	10
8	23	(Colombia) Carlos Huertas	Hitech Racing	10	+ 21.312	12
9	8	(Portugal) António Félix da Costa	Carlin	10	+ 26.268	11
10	15	(Spain) Daniel Juncadella	Prema Powerteam	10	+ 27.576	9
11	32	(Sweden) Felix Rosenqvist	Performance Racing	10	+ 31.265	7
12	12	(Brazil) Felipe Nasr	Räikkönen Robertson Racing	10	+ 35.510	15
13	7	(Malaysia) Jazeman Jaafar	Carlin	10	+ 36.516	13
14	14	(Indonesia) Rio Haryanto	Räikkönen Robertson Racing	10	+ 43.046	22
15	19	(Brazil) Lucas Foresti	Fortec Motorsport	10	+ 50.375	23
16	24	(Colombia) Carlos Muñoz	Hitech Racing	10	+ 50.894	21
17	9	(Japan) Yuji Kunimoto	TOM'S	10	+ 51.266	24
18	10	(Brazil) Rafael Suzuki	TOM'S	10	+ 52.066	17
19	18	(United Kingdom) William Buller	Fortec Motorsport	10	+ 53.481	28
20	21	(Japan) Yuhi Sekiguchi	ThreeBond Racing	10	+ 53.732	27
21	22	(Japan) Hideki Yamauchi	Hanashima Racing	10	+ 53.956	29
22	16	(Spain) Roberto Merhi	Prema Powerteam	10	+ 55.035	6
23	29	(Hong Kong) Adderly Fong	Sino Vision Racing	10	+ 56.503	30
24	13	(Macau) Michael Ho	Räikkönen Robertson Racing	10	+ 1:03.691	26
25	27	(Japan) Kimiya Sato	Motopark Academy	9	+ 1 lap	25
Ret	20	(Switzerland) Alexandre Imperatori	Toda Racing/KCMG	8	Accident	16
Ret	30	(United Kingdom) Hywel Lloyd	CF Racing/Manor Motorsport	2	Accident	14
Ret	17	(United Kingdom) Oliver Webb	Fortec Motorsport	0	Accident	19
Ret	6	(United Kingdom) James Calado	Carlin	0	Accident	18
Ret	11	(United Kingdom) Alexander Sims	Räikkönen Robertson Racing	0	Accident	20
Fastest lap: Laurens Vanthoor, 2:11.934, 166.993 km/h (103.765 mph) on lap 4

=== Main Race ===
Pos	No	Driver	Team	Laps	Time/Retired	Grid
1	1	(Italy) Edoardo Mortara	Signature	15	39:30.753	1
2	3	(Belgium) Laurens Vanthoor	Signature	15	+ 2.120	2
3	28	(Finland) Valtteri Bottas	Prema Powerteam	15	+ 3.156	4
4	2	(Germany) Marco Wittmann	Signature	15	+ 6.230	5
5	26	(Netherlands) Renger van der Zande	Motopark Academy	15	+ 10.631	6
6	8	(Portugal) António Félix da Costa	Carlin	15	+ 13.173	9
7	5	(France) Jean-Éric Vergne	Carlin	15	+ 16.508	7
8	16	(Spain) Roberto Merhi	Prema Powerteam	15	+ 19.313	22
9	32	(Sweden) Felix Rosenqvist	Performance Racing	15	+ 20.343	11
10	23	(Colombia) Carlos Huertas	Hitech Racing	15	+ 21.362	8
11	12	(Brazil) Felipe Nasr	Räikkönen Robertson Racing	15	+ 22.994	12
12	20	(Switzerland) Alexandre Imperatori	Toda Racing/KCMG	15	+ 23.926	26
13	22	(Japan) Hideki Yamauchi	Hanashima Racing	15	+ 25.486	21
14	7	(Malaysia) Jazeman Jaafar	Carlin	15	+ 25.989	13
15	18	(United Kingdom) William Buller	Fortec Motorsport	15	+ 31.563	19
16	9	(Japan) Yuji Kunimoto	TOM'S	15	+ 36.143	17
17	10	(Brazil) Rafael Suzuki	TOM'S	15	+ 36.621	18
18	17	(United Kingdom) Oliver Webb	Fortec Motorsport	15	+ 41.413	28
19	6	(United Kingdom) James Calado	Carlin	15	+ 41.753	29
20	21	(Japan) Yuhi Sekiguchi	ThreeBond Racing	15	+ 46.198	20
21	29	(Hong Kong) Adderly Fong	Sino Vision Racing	15	+ 46.336	23
22	19	(Brazil) Lucas Foresti	Fortec Motorsport	15	+ 46.731	15
23	30	(United Kingdom) Hywel Lloyd	CF Racing/Manor Motorsport	15	+ 49.720	27
24	27	(Japan) Kimiya Sato	Motopark Academy	15	+ 52.555	25
Ret	4	(Germany) Daniel Abt	Signature	2	Accident	3
Ret	15	(Spain) Daniel Juncadella	Prema Powerteam	0	Accident	10
Ret	14	(Indonesia) Rio Haryanto	Räikkönen Robertson Racing	0	Collision	14
Ret	24	(Colombia) Carlos Muñoz	Hitech Racing	0	Collision	16
Ret	13	(Macau) Michael Ho	Räikkönen Robertson Racing	0	Collision	24
Ret	11	(United Kingdom) Alexander Sims	Räikkönen Robertson Racing	0	Collision	30
Fastest lap: Edoardo Mortara, 2:11.480, 167.569 km/h (104.123 mph) on lap 11
