= 2006 Formula Toyota season =

2006 Formula Toyota

Seasons
- ← 2005 2007 →

The 2006 Formula Toyota season was the 17th season of Formula Toyota.

== Drivers ==
All cars are Bridgestone-shod Toyota FT30 cars with a Toyota 4A-GE engine.

Team	No.	Driver	Rounds
Saisei Ferodo	2	(Japan) Seiya Serizawa	1
NTT Electronics FT	2	(Japan) Kōichi Tsuchiya	10
Wako's Scholarship	5	(Japan) Takamitsu Matsui	10
TDP Scholarship FT	6	(Japan) Yoshifumi Kubota	All
TDP Scholarship FT	7	(Japan) Keisuke Kunimoto	All
TDP Scholarship FT	8	(Japan) Takuto Iguchi	All
Skill Speed	9	(Japan) Daisuke Ōta	All
Wako's Barrel House	12	(Japan) Kōjirō Tahara	All
Zap Speed	14	(Japan) Toshishige Ohnishi	1–7
BP Kotobuki FT	16	(Japan) Takeshi Matsumoto	1, 4–5
Future Eyes AIM-FT	18	(Japan) Tadahiro Maekawa	All
Techno Art	26	(Japan) Kiyofumi Abiko	All
Worldwide EAT BP	28	(Japan) Toshimitsu Takai	1–8
Glanza Promotion	28	(Japan) Keisuke Hatano	10
Corse FT	34	(Japan) Ryūichi Nara	All
Tyre Tengoku Akatsuka	39	(Japan) Tooru Satō	All
Bomex Casval FT	46	(Japan) Hiroshi Koizumi	All
Gamut Maseki Geinou FT	50	(Japan) Yūhi Sekiguchi	All
U-NUT Le Beausset; Gnomefest Le Beausset; Carmine Le Beausset	61	(Japan) Hideki Yamauchi	All
U-NUT Le Beausset; Gnomefest Le Beausset; Carmine Le Beausset	62	(Japan) Yūya Sakamoto	All
U-NUT Le Beausset; Gnomefest Le Beausset; Carmine Le Beausset	63	(Italy) Kei Cozzolino	2–10
Team Naoki	70	(Japan) Hiroki Yoshida	All
symtech ☆ DROPSFT	71	(Japan) Masayuki Yamashita	All
Apollo Le Prix Sports	72	(Japan) Hidenori Irie	All
Fujita/Mita Industries	74	(Japan) Yūki Fujita	All
Winds FT	82	(Japan) Kazuaki Itotagawa	1
Pronto Field FT	82	(Japan) Yū Uchida	7

== Event calendar and results ==
Round	Circuit	Location	Date	Pole position	Fastest lap	Winning driver
1	Fuji International Speedway	Oyama, Shizuoka	April 12	(Japan) Yūhi Sekiguchi	(Japan) Yūhi Sekiguchi	(Japan) Yūhi Sekiguchi
2	Sendai Hi-Land Raceway	Aoba-ku, Sendai	April 22	(Japan) Yuhi Sekiguchi	(Japan) Masayuki Yamashita	(Japan) Yūhi Sekiguchi
3	Sendai Hi-Land Raceway	Aoba-ku, Sendai	April 23	(Japan) Yuhi Sekiguchi	(Japan) Yūhi Sekiguchi	(Japan) Masayuki Yamashita
4	Okayama International Circuit	Mimasaka, Okayama	June 17	(Japan) Yuhi Sekiguchi	(Japan) Yūhi Sekiguchi	(Japan) Yūhi Sekiguchi
5	Okayama International Circuit	Mimasaka, Okayama	June 18	(Japan) Hideki Yamauchi	(Japan) Hideki Yamauchi	(Japan) Hideki Yamauchi
6	Suzuka Circuit	Suzuka, Mie	July 9	(Japan) Yūhi Sekiguchi	(Japan) Yūhi Sekiguchi	(Japan) Yūya Sakamoto
7	Suzuka Circuit	Suzuka, Mie	August 20	(Japan) Yūhi Sekiguchi	(Japan) Yūhi Sekiguchi	(Japan) Yūhi Sekiguchi
8	Sports Land SUGO	Murata, Miyagi	September 17	(Japan) Yūhi Sekiguchi	(Japan) Yūhi Sekiguchi	(Japan) Yūhi Sekiguchi
9	Twin Ring Motegi	Motegi, Tochigi	October 22	(Japan) Yūya Sakamoto	(Japan) Yūya Sakamoto	(Japan) Yūya Sakamoto
10	Fuji International Speedway	Oyama, Shizuoka	November 26	(Japan) Yūhi Sekiguchi	(Japan) Yūhi Sekiguchi	(Japan) Yūhi Sekiguchi

== Final standings ==
Position	Driver	Points
1	(Japan) Yūhi Sekiguchi	155
2	(Japan) Yūya Sakamoto	128
3	(Japan) Masayuki Yamashita	111
4	(Japan) Toshimitsu Takai	76
5	(Japan) Hideki Yamauchi	71
6	(Japan) Takuto Iguchi	57
7	(Japan) Keisuke Kunimoto	56
8	(Italy) Kei Cozzolino	40
9	(Japan) Hiroki Yoshida	31
