= 2011 Japanese Formula 3 Championship =

Seasons
- ← 2010 2012 →

The 2011 Japanese Formula 3 Championship was the 33rd edition of the Japanese Formula 3 Championship. It commenced on May 14 at Suzuka, and ended on September 24 at Sportsland SUGO after 16 races held at seven race meetings. It had been due to start there on 16 April, but was delayed due to the Tōhoku earthquake and tsunami that hit Japan in March.

== Teams and drivers ==
All teams were Japanese-registered.

Team	No.	Driver	Chassis (Note: All drivers competed in Dallara chassis; model listed.)	Engine	Rounds
Championship Class
Petronas Team TOM'S	1	(Japan) Naoya Gamou	F308	Toyota 1AZ-FE	All
Petronas Team TOM'S	36	(Singapore) Richard Bradley	F308	Toyota 1AZ-FE	All
Hanashima Racing	5	(Japan) Hideki Yamauchi	F308	Toyota 1AZ-FE	All
ThreeBond Racing	12	(Japan) Hironobu Yasuda	F309	Nissan SR20VE	All
SGC by KCMG	19	(Japan) Naoki Nishimoto	F306	Toyota 3S-GE	1–4
SGC by KCMG	19	(United Kingdom) Matt Howson	F306	Toyota 3S-GE	5–7
B-Max Engineering	50	(Japan) Yuhi Sekiguchi	F308	Toyota 1AZ-FE	2–7
National Class
Hanashima Racing	6	(Japan) Motoaki Ishikawa	F306	Toyota 3S-GE	1–4
Hanashima Racing	6	(Japan) Hiroshi Koizumi	F306	Toyota 3S-GE	6–7
HFDP Racing	7	(Japan) Kazuki Miura	F307	Toyota 3S-GE	All
HFDP Racing	8	(Japan) Tomoki Nojiri	F307	Toyota 3S-GE	All
SGC by KCMG	20	(Republic of Ireland) Gary Thompson	F307	Toyota 3S-GE	All
NDDP Racing	22	(Japan) Daiki Sasaki	F306	Toyota 3S-GE	All
NDDP Racing	23	(Japan) Katsumasa Chiyo	F306	Toyota 3S-GE	All
TOM'S Spirit	37	(Japan) Yuichi Nakayama	F306	Toyota 3S-GE	All
CMS Motor Sports Project	72	(Japan) Makoto Kanai	F306	Toyota 3S-GE	6
CMS Motor Sports Project	77	(Japan) Tatsuru Noro	F306	Toyota 3S-GE	2–4, 7

== Race calendar and results ==
- All races were held in Japan.

Round		Circuit	Date	Pole position	Fastest lap	Winning driver	Winning team	National Class winner
1	R1	Suzuka Circuit	14 May	(Japan) Hironobu Yasuda	(Japan) Hideki Yamauchi	(Japan) Hideki Yamauchi	Hanashima Racing	(Japan) Tomoki Nojiri
1	R2	Suzuka Circuit	15 May	(Japan) Hideki Yamauchi	(Japan) Hideki Yamauchi	(Japan) Hironobu Yasuda	ThreeBond Racing	(Japan) Katsumasa Chiyo
2	R1	Fuji Speedway	11 June	(Japan) Hironobu Yasuda	(Japan) Yuhi Sekiguchi	(Japan) Yuhi Sekiguchi	B-Max Engineering	(Japan) Yuichi Nakayama
2	R2	Fuji Speedway	12 June	(Japan) Hironobu Yasuda	(Japan) Yuhi Sekiguchi	(Japan) Hironobu Yasuda	ThreeBond Racing	(Japan) Katsumasa Chiyo
2	R3	Fuji Speedway	12 June		(Japan) Hironobu Yasuda	(Japan) Naoya Gamou	Petronas Team TOM'S	(Japan) Tomoki Nojiri
3	R1	Fuji Speedway	16 July	(Japan) Yuhi Sekiguchi	(Japan) Yuhi Sekiguchi	(Japan) Yuhi Sekiguchi	B-Max Engineering	(Japan) Kazuki Miura
3	R2	Fuji Speedway	17 July	(Japan) Yuhi Sekiguchi	(Japan) Yuhi Sekiguchi	(Japan) Hironobu Yasuda	ThreeBond Racing	(Japan) Yuichi Nakayama
4	R1	Twin Ring Motegi	6 August	(Japan) Yuhi Sekiguchi	(Japan) Yuhi Sekiguchi	(Japan) Yuhi Sekiguchi	B-Max Engineering	(Japan) Katsumasa Chiyo
4	R2	Twin Ring Motegi	7 August	(Japan) Yuhi Sekiguchi	(Japan) Yuhi Sekiguchi	(Japan) Yuhi Sekiguchi	B-Max Engineering	(Republic of Ireland) Gary Thompson
5	R1	Okayama International Circuit	27 August	(Japan) Yuhi Sekiguchi	(Japan) Hironobu Yasuda	(Japan) Hironobu Yasuda	ThreeBond Racing	(Japan) Tomoki Nojiri
5	R2	Okayama International Circuit	28 August	(Japan) Yuhi Sekiguchi	(Japan) Hideki Yamauchi	(Japan) Hideki Yamauchi	Hanashima Racing	(Japan) Yuichi Nakayama
6	R1	Suzuka Circuit	3 September	Round cancelled due to Typhoon Talas				
6	R2	Suzuka Circuit	4 September	Round cancelled due to Typhoon Talas				
7	R1	Sportsland SUGO	24 September	(Japan) Hideki Yamauchi	(Japan) Yuhi Sekiguchi	(Japan) Hideki Yamauchi	Hanashima Racing	(Japan) Katsumasa Chiyo
7	R2	Sportsland SUGO	25 September	(Japan) Yuhi Sekiguchi	(Japan) Yuhi Sekiguchi	(Japan) Yuhi Sekiguchi	B-Max Engineering	(Japan) Daiki Sasaki
7	R3	Sportsland SUGO	25 September		(Japan) Naoya Gamou	(Japan) Yuhi Sekiguchi	B-Max Engineering	(Japan) Katsumasa Chiyo

== Championship standings ==
=== Drivers' Championships ===
- Points are awarded as follows:

1	2	3	4	5	6	PP	FL
10	7	5	3	2	1	**1**	1

Pos	Driver	SUZ		FUJ			FUJ		MOT		OKA		SUZ		SUG			Pts
Championship Class
1	(Japan) Yuhi Sekiguchi			1	3	12	**1**	**7**	**1**	**1**	**2**	**3**	C	C	3	**1**	1	100
2	(Japan) Hironobu Yasuda	**8**	1	**2**	**1**	2	2	1	3	2	1	2	C	C	2	7	4	99
3	(Japan) Hideki Yamauchi	1	**2**	4	2	3	Ret	2	5	3	Ret	1	C	C	**1**	4	3	79
4	(Japan) Naoya Gamou	2	3	3	4	1	3	3	2	4	6	12	C	C	13	3	2	71
5	(Singapore) Richard Bradley	3	4	11	5	4	4	Ret	4	Ret	Ret	4	C	C	12	2	5	36
6	(Japan) Naoki Nishimoto	7	6	12	6	9	5	4	13	5								17
7	(United Kingdom) Matt Howson										9	5	C	C	14	Ret	6	7
National Class
1	(Japan) Katsumasa Chiyo	**Ret**	5	7	**7**	7	9	Ret	**6**	**8**	10	8	C	C	**4**	6	7	89
2	(Japan) Tomoki Nojiri	4	**7**	6	8	5	8	**8**	8	11	**3**	**10**	C	C	7	**8**	10	89
3	(Japan) Yuichi Nakayama	9	10	**5**	11	8	7	5	7	7	4	6	C	C	5	Ret	9	83
4	(Japan) Daiki Sasaki	6	8	9	12	10	11	6	9	10	7	7	C	C	8	5	8	58
5	(Republic of Ireland) Gary Thompson	5	11	10	9	6	10	10	14	6	5	9	C	C	6	Ret	12	52
6	(Japan) Kazuki Miura	10	9	8	10	11	**6**	9	10	9	8	11	C	C	9	9	11	41
7	(Japan) Tatsuru Noro			13	13	13	12	12	11	12					11	10	14	3
8	(Japan) Motoaki Ishikawa	11	12	14	14	14	13	11	12	13								2
9	(Japan) Hiroshi Koizumi												C	C	10	11	13	1
	(Japan) Makoto Kanai												C	C				0
Pos	Driver	SUZ		FUJ			FUJ		MOT		OKA		SUZ		SUG			Pts

Colour	Result
Gold	Winner
Silver	Second place
Bronze	Third place
Green	Points classification
Blue	Non-points classification
Blue	Non-classified finish (NC)
Purple	Retired, not classified (Ret)
Red	Did not qualify (DNQ)
Red	Did not pre-qualify (DNPQ)
Black	Disqualified (DSQ)
White	Did not start (DNS)
White	Withdrew (WD)
White	Race cancelled (C)
Blank	Did not practice (DNP)
Blank	Did not arrive (DNA)
Blank	Excluded (EX)

**Bold** – Pole
Italics – Fastest Lap

=== Teams' Championships ===
- Points are awarded for races as follows:

1	2	3	4	5	6
10	7	5	3	2	1

Pos	Team	SUZ		FUJ			FUJ		MOT		OKA		SUZ		SUG			Pts
Championship Class
1	ThreeBond Racing	8	1	2	1	2	2	1	3	2	1	2	C	C	2	7	4	94
2	B-Max Engineering			1	3	12	1	7	1	1	2	3	C	C	3	1	1	85
3	Petronas Team TOM'S	2	3	3	4	1	3	3	2	4	6	4	C	C	12	2	2	75
4	Hanashima Racing	1	2	4	2	3	Ret	2	5	3	Ret	1	C	C	1	4	3	74
5	SGC by KCMG	7	6	12	6	9	5	4	13	5	9	5	C	C	14	Ret	6	24
National Class
1	NDDP Racing	6	5	7	7	7	9	6	6	8	7	7	C	C	4	5	7	100
2	HFDP Racing	4	7	6	8	5	6	8	8	9	3	10	C	C	7	8	10	87
3	TOM'S Spirit	9	10	5	11	8	7	5	7	7	4	6	C	C	5	Ret	9	80
4	SGC by KCMG	5	11	10	9	6	10	10	14	6	5	9	C	C	6	Ret	12	49
5	CMS Motor Sports Project			13	13	13	12	12	11	12			C	C	11	10	14	3
6	Hanashima Racing	11	12	14	14	14	13	11	12	13			C	C	10	11	13	3
Pos	Team	SUZ		FUJ			FUJ		MOT		OKA		SUZ		SUG			Pts

=== Engine Tuners' Championship ===
- Points are awarded for races as follows:

1	2	3	4	5	6
10	7	5	3	2	1

Pos	Engine	SUZ		FUJ			FUJ		MOT		OKA		SUZ		SUG			Pts
1	TOM'S (Toyota)	2	3	1	3	1	1	3	1	1	2	3	C	C	3	1	1	109
2	Tomei (Nissan)	8	1	2	1	2	2	1	3	2	1	2	C	C	2	7	4	94
3	Hanashima (Toyota)	1	2	4	2	3	Ret	2	5	3	Ret	1	C	C	1	4	3	74
Pos	Engine	SUZ		FUJ			FUJ		MOT		OKA		SUZ		SUG			Pts
