= 2010 Japanese Formula 3 Championship =

Seasons
- ← 2009 2011 →

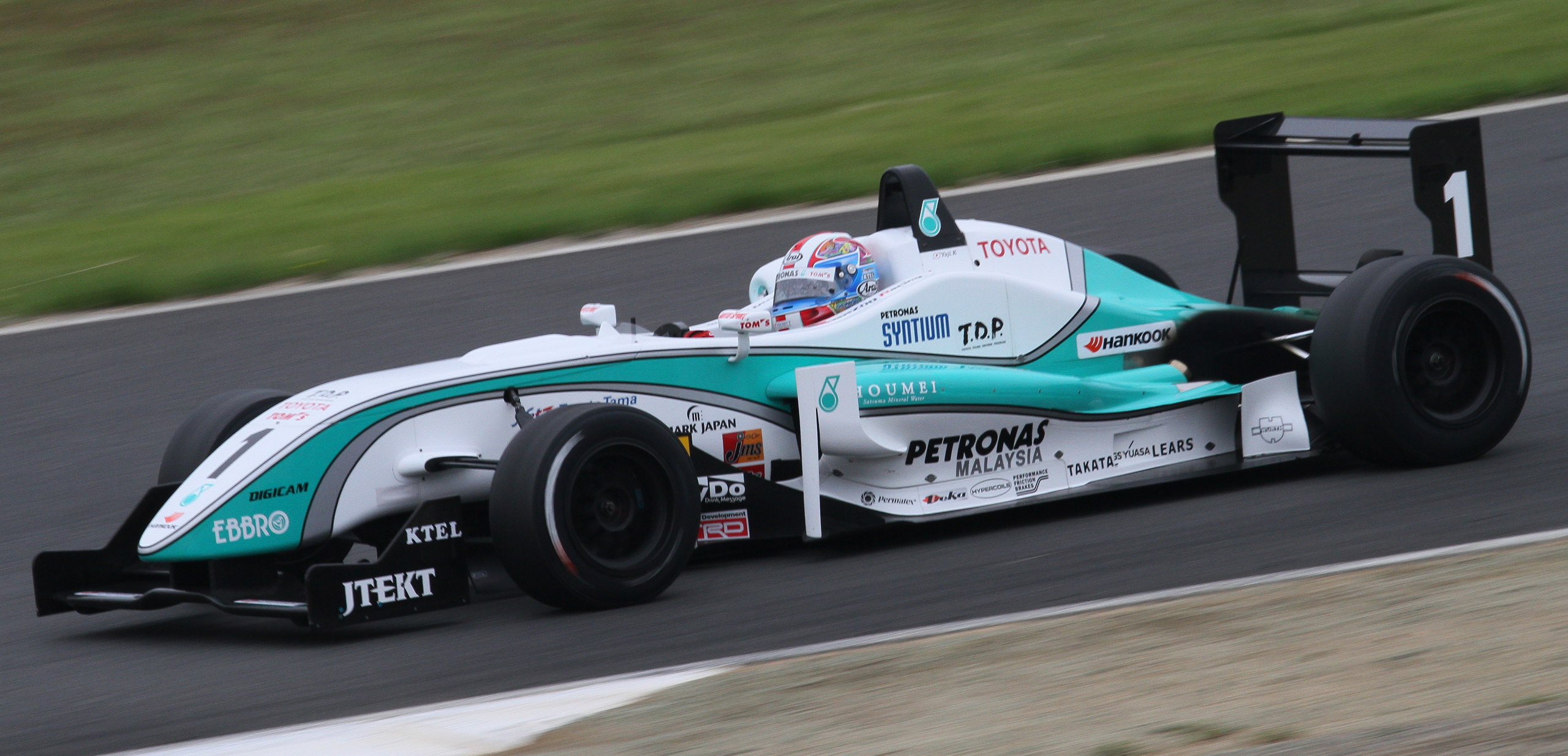
Yuji Kunimoto won ten of the first eleven races of the season to secure the championship.

The 2010 Japanese Formula 3 Championship was the 32nd edition of the Japanese Formula 3 Championship. It commenced on April 17 at Suzuka and ended on October 17 at Autopolis after 16 races held at eight race meetings.

All the Championship Class titles were secured at the Okayama meeting in September, with Yuji Kunimoto securing the drivers' title with five races to spare. The TOM'S driver had recorded a series record ten consecutive wins to start the season before finishing second to team-mate Rafael Suzuki in round 11 to secure the title. Despite not winning another race after clinching the title, Kunimoto still finished 58 points ahead of closest rival Yuhi Sekiguchi of ThreeBond Racing. Sekiguchi failed to win a race, but finished eleven races on the podium and overhauled Suzuki for the runner-up position. Suzuki had taken three wins in succession – two at Okayama and one at Sugo but failed to take part in either race at the final round at Autopolis in order to prioritise his commitments for the Macau Grand Prix the following month.

Koki Saga finished fourth, taking his first two victories in Formula Three at the final meeting at Autopolis, while Alexandre Imperatori finished fifth. The only other race-winner was Hideki Yamauchi, who took six podium finishes – including a win at Sugo – in his eight starts. Suzuki's first win at Okayama also gave TOM'S the teams title and the engine tuners championship, having amassed a maximum score up to round 14. ThreeBond Racing finished runners-up in the teams' championship, while Hanashima Racing's Toyota engines finished second in the tuners' championship.

In the National Class, the championship battle revolved around two drivers, HFDP Racing's Takashi Kobayashi and TOM'S Spirit driver Naoya Gamou, with the championship race going down to the final meeting at Autopolis. Kobayashi's sixth win of the season in the first race of the weekend, coupled with a Gamou retirement allowed Kobayashi to clinch the title with a race to spare. Gamou took eight wins on the season – including seven in succession at Fuji along with doubles at Motegi, Okayama and Sugo – but finished three points in arrears of Kobayashi. Third place went to Team Le Beausset's Katsumasa Chiyo, who won at the first Motegi meeting and fourth went to the other race-winner, Team Nova's Kimiya Sato, who won at the second Fuji meeting. As well as Kobayashi's drivers' championship, HFDP Racing clinched the teams' championship by five points ahead of TOM'S Spirit.

== Teams and drivers ==
- The provisional entry list for the series was released on March 10, 2010. All teams were Japanese-registered.

| Team | No | Driver | Chassis (Note: All drivers competed in Dallara chassis; model listed.) | Engine | Rounds |
Championship Class
| Petronas Team TOM'S; TOM'S Spirit | 1 | (Japan) Yuji Kunimoto | F308 | Toyota 1AZ-FE | All |
| Petronas Team TOM'S; TOM'S Spirit | 36 | (Brazil) Rafael Suzuki | F308 | Toyota 1AZ-FE | 1–7 |
| Toda Racing | 2 | (Switzerland) Alexandre Imperatori | F308 | Mugen-Honda MF204C | All |
| Hanashima Racing | 5 | (Japan) Hiroki Yoshida | F308 | Toyota 1AZ-FE | 1–2 |
| Hanashima Racing | 5 | (Japan) Katsuaki Kubota | F308 | Toyota 1AZ-FE | 3–4 |
| Hanashima Racing | 5 | (Japan) Hideki Yamauchi | F308 | Toyota 1AZ-FE | 5–8 |
| ThreeBond Racing | 12 | (Japan) Yuhi Sekiguchi | F308 | Nissan SR20VE | All |
| Denso Team Le Beausset | 62 | (Japan) Koki Saga | F308 | Toyota 1AZ-FE | All |
National Class
| Hanashima Racing | 6 | (Japan) Katsuaki Kubota | F306 | Toyota 3S-GE | 7 |
| Hanashima Racing | 6 | (Japan) Hiroki Yoshida | F306 | Toyota 3S-GE | 8 |
| HFDP Racing | 7 | (Japan) Kazuki Miura | F307 | Toyota 3S-GE | All |
| HFDP Racing | 8 | (Japan) Takashi Kobayashi | F307 | Toyota 3S-GE | All |
| Aim Sports | 18 | (Japan) Tsubasa Mekaru | F307/305 | Toyota 3S-GE | 1–3 |
| Achievement by KCMG | 19 | (Japan) Yoshitaka Kuroda | F307 | Toyota 3S-GE | All |
| Achievement by KCMG | 20 | (Republic of Ireland) Gary Thompson | F306 | Toyota 3S-GE | All |
| Achievement by KCMG | 21 | (Japan) Hajime Oonami | F305 | Toyota 3S-GE | 1–3 |
| Achievement by KCMG | 21 | (Japan) Yousuke Morishita | F305 | Toyota 3S-GE | 4, 7 |
| Team Nova | 22 | (Japan) Daiki Sasaki | F306 | Toyota 3S-GE | All |
| Team Nova | 23 | (Japan) Kimiya Sato | F306 | Toyota 3S-GE | All |
| Petronas Team TOM'S; TOM'S Spirit | 37 | (Japan) Naoya Gamou | F306 | Toyota 3S-GE | All |
| Denso Team Le Beausset | 63 | (Japan) Katsumasa Chiyo | F305 | Toyota 3S-GE | All |
| CMS Motor Sports Project | 77 | (Japan) Hiroshi Koizumi | F306 | Toyota 3S-GE | 1, 4–5 |
| CMS Motor Sports Project | 77 | (Japan) Tatsuru Noro | F306 | Toyota 3S-GE | 2–3, 7 |

== Race calendar and results ==
- All races were held in Japan, and were in support of Formula Nippon at all rounds except the first Fuji round and Okayama.

| Round | | Circuit | Date | Pole position | Fastest lap | Winning driver | Winning team | National Class winner |
|---|---|---|---|---|---|---|---|---|
| 1 | R1 | Suzuka Circuit | 17 April | (Japan) Yuji Kunimoto | (Japan) Yuji Kunimoto | (Japan) Yuji Kunimoto | Petronas Team TOM'S | (Japan) Takashi Kobayashi |
| 1 | R2 | Suzuka Circuit | 18 April | (Japan) Koki Saga | (Japan) Yuji Kunimoto | (Japan) Yuji Kunimoto | Petronas Team TOM'S | (Japan) Takashi Kobayashi |
| 2 | R1 | Twin Ring Motegi | 22 May | (Japan) Yuji Kunimoto | (Japan) Yuji Kunimoto | (Japan) Yuji Kunimoto | Petronas Team TOM'S | (Japan) Katsumasa Chiyo |
| 2 | R2 | Twin Ring Motegi | 23 May | (Japan) Yuji Kunimoto | (Japan) Yuji Kunimoto | (Japan) Yuji Kunimoto | Petronas Team TOM'S | (Japan) Takashi Kobayashi |
| 3 | R1 | Fuji Speedway | 12 June | (Japan) Yuji Kunimoto | (Japan) Yuji Kunimoto | (Japan) Yuji Kunimoto | Petronas Team TOM'S | (Japan) Takashi Kobayashi |
| 3 | R2 | Fuji Speedway | 13 June | (Japan) Yuji Kunimoto | (Japan) Yuji Kunimoto | (Japan) Yuji Kunimoto | Petronas Team TOM'S | (Japan) Takashi Kobayashi |
| 4 | R1 | Fuji Speedway | 17 July | (Japan) Yuji Kunimoto | (Japan) Yuji Kunimoto | (Japan) Yuji Kunimoto | Petronas Team TOM'S | (Japan) Kimiya Sato |
| 4 | R2 | Fuji Speedway | 18 July | (Japan) Yuji Kunimoto | (Japan) Yuji Kunimoto | (Japan) Yuji Kunimoto | Petronas Team TOM'S | (Japan) Naoya Gamou |
| 5 | R1 | Twin Ring Motegi | 7 August | (Japan) Yuji Kunimoto | (Japan) Yuhi Sekiguchi | (Japan) Yuji Kunimoto | Petronas Team TOM'S | (Japan) Naoya Gamou |
| 5 | R2 | Twin Ring Motegi | 8 August | (Japan) Yuji Kunimoto | (Japan) Yuji Kunimoto | (Japan) Yuji Kunimoto | Petronas Team TOM'S | (Japan) Naoya Gamou |
| 6 | R1 | Okayama International Circuit | 4 September | (Japan) Hideki Yamauchi | (Japan) Yuhi Sekiguchi | (Brazil) Rafael Suzuki | Petronas Team TOM'S | (Japan) Naoya Gamou |
| 6 | R2 | Okayama International Circuit | 5 September | (Brazil) Rafael Suzuki | (Brazil) Rafael Suzuki | (Brazil) Rafael Suzuki | Petronas Team TOM'S | (Japan) Naoya Gamou |
| 7 | R1 | Sportsland SUGO | 25 September | (Japan) Hideki Yamauchi | (Japan) Yuhi Sekiguchi | (Brazil) Rafael Suzuki | Petronas Team TOM'S | (Japan) Naoya Gamou |
| 7 | R2 | Sportsland SUGO | 26 September | (Japan) Hideki Yamauchi | (Japan) Yuji Kunimoto | (Japan) Hideki Yamauchi | Hanashima Racing | (Japan) Naoya Gamou |
| 8 | R1 | Autopolis | 16 October | (Japan) Hideki Yamauchi | (Japan) Koki Saga | (Japan) Koki Saga | Denso Team Le Beausset | (Japan) Takashi Kobayashi |
| 8 | R2 | Autopolis | 17 October | (Japan) Hideki Yamauchi | (Japan) Koki Saga | (Japan) Koki Saga | Denso Team Le Beausset | (Japan) Naoya Gamou |

== Championship standings ==
=== Drivers' Championships ===
- Points were awarded as follows:

| 1 | 2 | 3 | 4 | 5 | 6 | PP | FL |
|---|---|---|---|---|---|---|---|
| 10 | 7 | 5 | 3 | 2 | 1 | **1** | 1 |

| Pos | Driver | SUZ | | MOT | | FUJ | | FUJ | | MOT | | OKA | | SUG | | AUT | | Pts |
Championship Class
| 1 | (Japan) Yuji Kunimoto | **1** | 1 | **1** | **1** | **1** | **1** | **1** | **1** | **1** | **1** | 2 | 4 | 3 | 4 | 5 | Ret | 139 |
| 2 | (Japan) Yuhi Sekiguchi | 5 | 4 | 2 | 3 | 2 | 3 | 2 | 4 | 2 | 2 | 3 | 2 | Ret | 11 | 3 | 2 | 81 |
| 3 | (Brazil) Rafael Suzuki | 4 | 3 | 5 | 4 | 3 | 2 | 3 | 2 | 6 | 4 | 1 | **1** | 1 | 3 | | | 78 |
| 4 | (Japan) Koki Saga | 2 | **2** | 4 | 7 | 5 | 5 | 5 | 5 | 4 | 6 | 4 | 5 | 15 | 2 | 1 | 1 | 68 |
| 5 | (Switzerland) Alexandre Imperatori | 3 | 17 | 3 | 2 | 4 | 4 | 4 | 3 | 5 | 5 | 5 | 6 | 4 | 5 | 4 | 3 | 52 |
| 6 | (Japan) Hideki Yamauchi | | | | | | | | | 3 | 3 | **8** | 3 | **2** | **1** | **2** | **Ret** | 45 |
| 7 | (Japan) Hiroki Yoshida | 6 | 5 | 6 | 14 | | | | | | | | | | | | | 5 |
| 8 | (Japan) Katsuaki Kubota | | | | | 8 | 9 | 16 | 11 | | | | | | | | | 4 |
National Class
| 1 | (Japan) Takashi Kobayashi | **7** | **6** | 8 | **5** | **6** | 6 | 8 | 7 | 8 | **11** | **7** | 8 | **7** | 10 | 6 | Ret | 124 |
| 2 | (Japan) Naoya Gamou | 12 | 8 | **Ret** | 6 | 7 | 7 | **10** | **6** | **7** | 7 | 6 | **7** | 5 | **6** | Ret | **4** | 121 |
| 3 | (Japan) Katsumasa Chiyo | 8 | 7 | 7 | 10 | 14 | Ret | 7 | 9 | 12 | 9 | 11 | 9 | 9 | 9 | **9** | 5 | 66 |
| 4 | (Japan) Kimiya Sato | 10 | 11 | Ret | 8 | 9 | DSQ | 6 | 8 | 10 | 13 | 12 | 11 | Ret | 7 | Ret | Ret | 43 |
| 5 | (Republic of Ireland) Gary Thompson | 13 | 12 | 10 | 9 | 10 | 10 | 9 | 13 | 13 | 8 | 10 | 14 | 11 | 8 | Ret | 7 | 33 |
| 6 | (Japan) Kazuki Miura | 9 | 13 | 9 | Ret | 12 | Ret | 12 | 12 | 11 | 14 | 9 | 10 | 8 | 12 | Ret | 6 | 31 |
| 7 | (Japan) Daiki Sasaki | 11 | 10 | 11 | Ret | 11 | Ret | 13 | 10 | 9 | 10 | 13 | 12 | 6 | Ret | 10 | Ret | 29 |
| 8 | (Japan) Yoshitaka Kuroda | 16 | 9 | 12 | 11 | 13 | 11 | 11 | 16 | 14 | 12 | Ret | 13 | 10 | 13 | 7 | 9 | 18 |
| 9 | (Japan) Hiroki Yoshida | | | | | | | | | | | | | | | 8 | 8 | 7 |
| 10 | (Japan) Tsubasa Mekaru | 15 | 14 | 14 | 12 | 16 | **8** | | | | | | | | | | | 6 |
| 11 | (Japan) Hajime Oonami | 17 | 16 | 13 | 13 | 15 | 12 | | | | | | | | | | | 1 |
| 12 | (Japan) Yousuke Morishita | | | | | | | 14 | 14 | | | | | 12 | 14 | | | 0 |
| 13 | (Japan) Tatsuru Noro | | | Ret | Ret | 17 | 13 | | | | | | | 13 | 16 | | | 0 |
| 14 | (Japan) Hiroshi Koizumi | 14 | 15 | | | | | 15 | 15 | 15 | Ret | | | | | | | 0 |
| 15 | (Japan) Katsuaki Kubota | | | | | | | | | | | | | 14 | 15 | | | 0 |
| Pos | Driver | SUZ | | MOT | | FUJ | | FUJ | | MOT | | OKA | | SUG | | AUT | | Pts |

| Colour | Result |
|---|---|
| Gold | Winner |
| Silver | Second place |
| Bronze | Third place |
| Green | Points classification |
| Blue | Non-points classification |
| Blue | Non-classified finish (NC) |
| Purple | Retired, not classified (Ret) |
| Red | Did not qualify (DNQ) |
| Red | Did not pre-qualify (DNPQ) |
| Black | Disqualified (DSQ) |
| White | Did not start (DNS) |
| White | Withdrew (WD) |
| White | Race cancelled (C) |
| Blank | Did not practice (DNP) |
| Blank | Did not arrive (DNA) |
| Blank | Excluded (EX) |

**Bold** – Pole
Italics – Fastest Lap

=== Teams' Championships ===
- Points were awarded for both races as follows:

| 1 | 2 | 3 | 4 | 5 | 6 |
|---|---|---|---|---|---|
| 10 | 7 | 5 | 3 | 2 | 1 |

| Pos | Team | SUZ | | MOT | | FUJ | | FUJ | | MOT | | OKA | | SUG | | AUT | | Pts |
Championship Class
| 1 | Petronas Team TOM'S | 1 | 1 | 1 | 1 | 1 | 1 | 1 | 1 | 1 | 1 | 1 | 1 | 1 | 3 | 5 | Ret | 137 |
| 2 | ThreeBond Racing | 5 | 4 | 2 | 3 | 2 | 3 | 2 | 4 | 2 | 2 | 3 | 2 | Ret | 11 | 3 | 2 | 78 |
| 3 | Denso Team Le Beausset | 2 | 2 | 4 | 7 | 5 | 5 | 5 | 5 | 4 | 6 | 4 | 5 | 15 | 2 | 1 | 1 | 65 |
| 4 | Toda Racing | 3 | 17 | 3 | 2 | 4 | 4 | 4 | 3 | 5 | 5 | 5 | 6 | 4 | 5 | 4 | 3 | 52 |
| 5 | Hanashima Racing | 6 | 5 | 6 | 14 | 8 | 9 | 16 | 11 | 3 | 3 | 8 | 3 | 2 | 1 | 2 | Ret | 49 |
National Class
| 1 | HFDP Racing | 7 | 6 | 8 | 5 | 6 | 6 | 8 | 7 | 8 | 11 | 7 | 8 | 7 | 10 | 6 | 6 | 114 |
| 2 | TOM'S Spirit | 12 | 8 | Ret | 6 | 7 | 7 | 10 | 6 | 7 | 7 | 6 | 7 | 5 | 6 | Ret | 4 | 109 |
| 3 | Denso Team Le Beausset | 8 | 7 | 7 | 10 | 14 | Ret | 7 | 9 | 12 | 9 | 11 | 9 | 9 | 9 | 9 | 5 | 64 |
| 4 | Team Nova | 10 | 10 | 11 | 8 | 9 | Ret | 6 | 8 | 9 | 10 | 12 | 11 | 6 | 7 | 10 | Ret | 59 |
| 5 | Achievement by KCMG | 13 | 9 | 10 | 9 | 10 | 10 | 9 | 13 | 13 | 8 | 10 | 13 | 10 | 8 | 7 | 7 | 44 |
| 6 | Hanashima Racing | | | | | | | | | | | | | 14 | 15 | 8 | 8 | 7 |
| 7 | Aim Sports | 15 | 14 | 14 | 12 | 16 | 8 | | | | | | | | | | | 5 |
| 8 | CMS Motor Sports Project | 14 | 15 | Ret | Ret | 17 | 13 | 15 | 15 | 15 | Ret | | | 13 | 16 | | | 0 |
| Pos | Team | SUZ | | MOT | | FUJ | | FUJ | | MOT | | OKA | | SUG | | AUT | | Pts |

=== Engine Tuners' Championship ===
- Points were awarded for both races as follows:

| 1 | 2 | 3 | 4 | 5 | 6 |
|---|---|---|---|---|---|
| 10 | 7 | 5 | 3 | 2 | 1 |

| Pos | Engine | SUZ | | MOT | | FUJ | | FUJ | | MOT | | OKA | | SUG | | AUT | | Pts |
|---|---|---|---|---|---|---|---|---|---|---|---|---|---|---|---|---|---|---|
| 1 | Toyota-TOM'S | 1 | 1 | 1 | 1 | 1 | 1 | 1 | 1 | 1 | 1 | 1 | 1 | 1 | 3 | 5 | Ret | 137 |
| 2 | Toyota-Hanashima | 2 | 2 | 4 | 7 | 5 | 5 | 5 | 5 | 3 | 3 | 4 | 3 | 2 | 1 | 1 | 1 | 82 |
| 3 | Nissan-Tomei | 5 | 4 | 2 | 3 | 2 | 3 | 2 | 4 | 2 | 2 | 3 | 2 | Ret | 11 | 3 | 2 | 78 |
| 4 | Mugen-Toda | 3 | 17 | 3 | 2 | 4 | 4 | 4 | 3 | 5 | 5 | 5 | 6 | 4 | 5 | 4 | 3 | 52 |
| Pos | Engine | SUZ | | MOT | | FUJ | | FUJ | | MOT | | OKA | | SUG | | AUT | | Pts |
