= Rafael Suzuki =

Brazilian-Japanese racing driver (born 1987)

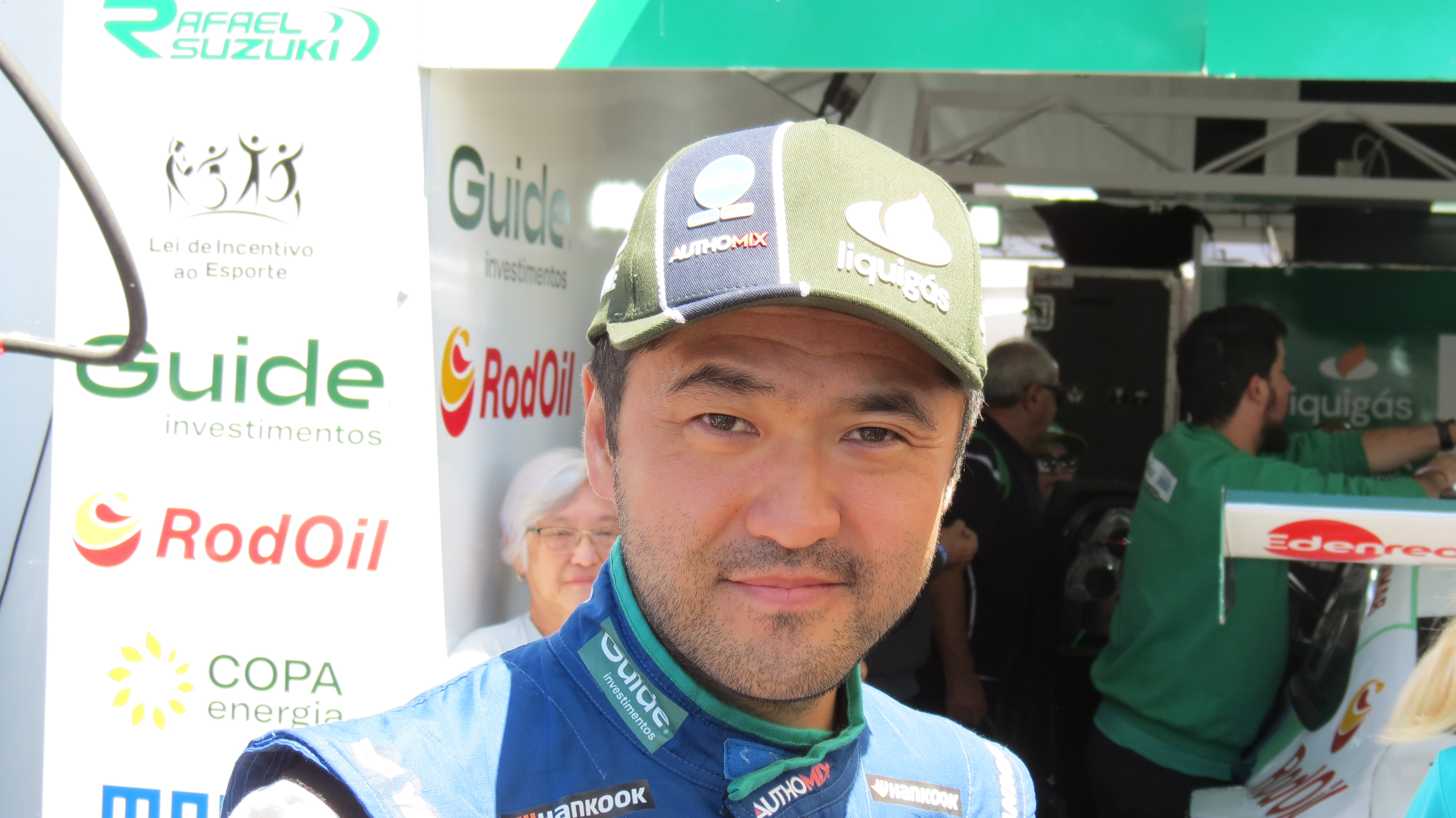
- Suzuki in 2024
- Nationality: (Brazil) Brazilian
- Born: Rafael Hideo Suzuki; 13 August 1987 (age 39) São Paulo, Brazil

Stock Car Pro Series career
- Debut season: 2014
- Current team: Pole Motorsport
- Categorisation: FIA Gold (until 2015); FIA Silver (2016–)
- Car number: 8
- Starts: 211
- Wins: 2
- Podiums: 2
- Poles: 1
- Best finish: 6th in 2023

Previous series
- 2013 2012 2010, 2012 2008-09 2007-08 2007: International GT Open; Auto GP World Series; All-Japan Formula Three Championship; German Formula Three Championship; Asian F3 Pacific Series; Formula Three Sudamericana

Rafael Hideo Suzuki (born 13 August 1987) is a Brazilian racing driver of Japanese descent who currently competes for Pole Motorsport in the Stock Car Pro Series, which he has raced in since 2014. He previously raced in a number of international Formula Three series, including the All-Japan Formula Three Championship and the German Formula Three Championship.

== Career ==
=== 1998 - Go-Kart ===
After a few indoor go-kart races, Suzuki started to compete at the age of ten in 1998, and soon went to some wins and titles, building a successful career.

== Racing record ==
=== Racing career summary ===
Season	Series	Team	Races	Poles	Wins	Podiums	F.Laps	Points	Position
2007	Formula São Paulo	Phebem Fórmula	2	1	0	0	?	4	17th
2007	Formula 3 Sudamericana	Cesário Fórmula	6	0	0	0	0	15	13th
2007–08	Asian F3 Pacific Series	Team Goddard	18	3	1	13	0	221	**3rd**
2008	German Formula 3 Championship	Performance Racing	18	1	0	2	0	55	7th
2009	German Formula 3 Championship	Performance Racing	10	1	0	3	0	65	4th
2009	German Formula 3 Championship	HS Technik Motorsport	6	0	0	1	0	65	4th
2009	German Formula 3 Championship	Jenichen Motorsport	2	0	0	0	0	65	4th
2010	Japanese Formula 3 Championship	TOM'S	14	1	3	9	1	78	**3rd**
2010	Macau Grand Prix	TOM'S	1	0	0	0	0	N/A	18th
2012	Japanese Formula 3 Championship	Toda Racing	15	0	0	5	0	38	6th
2012	Auto GP World Series	Ombra Racing	2	0	0	0	0	12	17th
2013	International GT Open - GTS	Bhai Tech Racing	15	0	3	5	0	54	**3rd**
2013	Spanish GT Championship	Team Novadriver	3	0	0	1	0	0	N/A
2014	Stock Car Brasil	ProGP	21	0	0	0	0	47.5	27th
2015	Stock Car Brasil	RZ Motorsport	21	0	0	0	0	51	27th
2016	Stock Car Brasil	Vogel Motorsport	18	0	0	0	0	117	17th
2017	Stock Car Brasil	Cavaleiro Racing	22	0	0	1	0	93	18th
2018	Stock Car Brasil	Bardahl Hot Car	21	0	0	1	0	61	16th
2018	Lamborghini Super Trofeo Europe - Pro	ArtLine Team Georgia	2	0	0	0	0	0	N/A
2019	Stock Car Brasil	Hot Car Competições	20	0	0	0	0	94	23rd
2019	Império Endurance Brasil - P1	Power Imports Racing Team	2	0	0	0	0	0	N/A
2020	Stock Car Brasil	Full Time Bassani	18	0	1	1	0	172	14th
2020	Império Endurance Brasil - P1	Power Imports Racing Team	3	0	0	0	0	0	N/A
2020	Porsche Endurance Series - GT3 Cup	N/A	3	1	0	2	0	192	**3rd**
2021	Stock Car Pro Series	Full Time Bassani	23	1	1	2	0	185	16th
2021	Porsche Endurance Series - GT3 Cup	N/A	3	3	1	2	0	199	**2nd**
2022	Stock Car Pro Series	Full Time Bassani	23	0	0	0	0	172	13th
2022	24H GT Series - 992	Three Sixty Racing Team							
2023	Stock Car Pro Series	Pole Motorsport	24	0	0	4	1	263	6th
2023	TCR South America Touring Car Championship	PMO Motorsport	16	2	0	2	4	331	6th
2023	TCR World Tour	PMO Motorsport	2	0	0	0	0	5	47th
2023	TCR Brazil Touring Car Championship	PMO Motorsport	11	2	0	2	3	221	5th
2024	Stock Car Pro Series	TMG Racing							
2024	TCR South America Touring Car Championship	PMO Racing	14	1	0	1	1	271	8th
2024	TCR World Tour	PMO Racing	4	0	0	0	0	24	16th
2024	TCR Brazil Touring Car Championship	PMO Racing	7	3	0	2	3	186	7th
2025	GT Winter Series - GT3	Comtoyou Racing							
2025	GT World Challenge Europe Sprint Cup	Comtoyou Racing	6	0	0	0	0	0	NC
2025	GT World Challenge Europe Sprint Cup – Bronze	Comtoyou Racing	6	1	0	0	0	8	17th
2026	Porsche Carrera Cup Brasil								

=== Complete German Formula Three Championship results ===
(key) (Races in bold indicate pole position) (Races in italics indicate fastest lap)

Year	Entrant	Chassis	Engine	1	2	3	4	5	6	7	8	9	10	11	12	13	14	15	16	17	18	Pos	Points
2008	Performance Racing	Dallara F305	OPC-Challenge	HOC1; 1; 4	HOC1; 2; 5	OSC1; 1; 9	OSC1; 2; 4	NÜR1; 1; 10	NÜR1; 2; 14	HOC2; 1; 5	**HOC2**; **2**; 8	ASS; 1; 3	ASS; 2; 6	NÜR2; 1; 5	NÜR2; 2; 3	LAU; 1; 7	LAU; 2; 5	SAC; 1; 6	SAC; 2; 6	OSC2; 1 Ret	OSC2; 2; 5	7th	55
2009	Performance Racing	Dallara F305	Volkswagen	OSC1; 1; 4	OSC1; 2; 3	NÜR1; 1; 4	NÜR1; 2; 7	**HOC**; **1** Ret	HOC; 2; 4	OSC2; 1; 4	OSC2; 2; 3	LAU; 1; 2	LAU; 2; 6									4th	65
2009	HS Technik Motorsport	Dallara F305	Mercedes											ASS; 1; 4	ASS; 2; 3	NÜR2; 1; 6	NÜR2; 2; 6			OSC3; 1 Ret	OSC3; 2; 13	4th	65
2009	Jenichen Motorsport	Dallara F305	OPC Challenge															SAC; 1; 9	SAC; 2; 10			4th	65

=== Complete Stock Car Brasil results ===
Year	Team	Car	1	2	3	4	5	6	7	8	9	10	11	12	13	14	15	16	17	18	19	20	21	22	23	24	Rank	Points
2014	ProGP	Chevrolet Sonic	INT; 1; 25	SCZ; 1; 20	SCZ; 2; 17	BRA; 1; 23	BRA; 2 Ret	GOI; 1 Ret	GOI; 2 DNS	GOI; 1 Ret	CAS; 1; 15	CAS; 2; 20	CUR; 1; 20	CUR; 2; 27	VEL; 1; 19	VEL; 2; 18	SCZ; 1; 18	SCZ; 2; 15	TAR; 1; 16	TAR; 2; 18	SAL; 1; 19	SAL; 2; 13	CUR; 1; 8				27th	47.5
2015	RZ Motorsport	Chevrolet Sonic	GOI; 1; 27	RBP; 1; 16	RBP; 2; 11	VEL; 1; 15	VEL; 2; 19	CUR; 1; 19	CUR; 2; 22	SCZ; 1; 19	SCZ; 2; 18	CUR; 1; 13	CUR; 2; 11	GOI; 1; 19	CAS; 1; 28	CAS; 2; 15	MOU; 1; 17	MOU; 2; 18	CUR; 1; 7	CUR; 2; 17	TAR; 1 Ret	TAR; 2 DNS	INT; 1 Ret				27th	51
2016	Vogel Motorsport	Chevrolet Cruze	CUR; 1; 10	VEL; 1; 15	VEL; 2; 10	GOI; 1; 10	**GOI**; **2**; 21	SCZ; 1; 16	SCZ; 2; 8	TAR; 1 DSQ	TAR; 2 EX	CAS; 1; 7	CAS; 2; 14	INT; 1 Ret	LON; 1 Ret	LON; 2 Ret	CUR; 1; 20	CUR; 2; 11	GOI; 1; 19	GOI; 2; 12	CRI; 1; 13	CRI; 2; 20	INT; 1; 7				17th	117
2017	Cavaleiro Sports	Chevrolet Cruze	GOI; 1; 13	GOI; 2; 11	VEL; 1; 15	VEL; 2; 15	SCZ; 1; 21	SCZ; 2; 5	CAS; 1; 14	CAS; 2; 16	CUR; 1; 25	CRI; 1; 9	CRI; 2; 5	VCA; 1; 20	VCA; 2; 17	LON; 1; 15	LON; 2; 11	ARG; 1; 20	ARG; 2; 3	TAR; 1 Ret	TAR; 2; 17	GOI; 1; 19	GOI; 2; 14	INT; 1; 23			18th	93
2018	Bardahl Hot Car	Chevrolet Cruze	INT; 1; 9	CUR; 1; 10	**CUR**; **2**; 6	VEL; 1; 16	VEL; 2; 11	LON; 1; 22	LON; 2; 17	SCZ; 1; 12	SCZ; 2 Ret	GOI; 1; 14	MOU; 1; 15	MOU; 2; 10	CAS; 1; 10	**CAS**; **2**; 3	VCA; 1; 22	VCA; 2; 21	TAR; 1 DSQ	TAR; 2 Ret	GOI; 1; 11	GOI; 2; 10	INT; 1; 25				16th	61
2019	Hot Car Competições	Chevrolet Cruze	VEL; 1; 15	VCA; 1; 12	VCA; 2; 18	GOI; 1; 17	GOI; 2; 17	LON; 1; 17	LON; 2 Ret	SCZ; 1; 12	SCZ; 2 Ret	MOU; 1 Ret	MOU; 2 Ret	INT; 1; 16	VEL; 1; 24	VEL; 2; 11	CAS; 1; 9	CAS; 2; 6	VCA; 1; 14	VCA; 2; 20	GOI; 1 Ret	GOI; 2; 18	INT; 1 Ret				23rd	94
2020	Full Time Bassani	Toyota Corolla	GOI; 1 Ret	GOI; 2; 7	INT; 1; 4	INT; 2; 13	LON; 1; 1	LON; 2 Ret	CAS; 1; 8	CAS; 2; 17	CAS; 3; 6	VCA; 1; 17	VCA; 2; 10	CUR; 1; 18	CUR; 2; 14	CUR; 3; 17	GOI; 1; 15	GOI; 2; 11	GOI; 3; 16	INT; 1; 11							14th	172
2021	Full Time Bassani	Toyota Corolla	GOI; 1; 12	GOI; 2; 16	INT; 1; 12	INT; 2; 15	VCA; 1; 6	VCA; 2; 11	VCA; 1; 15	VCA; 2; 21	CAS; 1; 8	CAS; 2; 27	CUR; 1; 9	CUR; 2; 24	**CUR**; **1**; 1	CUR; 2; 5	GOI; 1; 16	GOI; 2; 14	GOI; 1; 22	GOI; 2; 10	VCA; 1; 23	VCA; 2; 14	SCZ; 1; 23	SCZ; 2; 2	INT; 1; 21	INT; 2 Ret	16th	185
2022	Full Time Bassani	Toyota Corolla	INT; 1; 9^{6}	GOI; 1; 4	GOI; 2 Ret	RIO; 1; 9	RIO; 2 Ret	VCA; 1; 16	VCA; 2; 17	VEL; 1; 7	VEL; 2; 5	VEL; 1; 7	VEL; 2; 7	INT; 1; 23	INT; 2; 19	SCZ; 1; 26	SCZ; 2 Ret	VCA; 1; 10	VCA; 2; 10	GOI; 1; 11	GOI; 2; 20	GOI; 1 Ret	GOI; 2; 14	BRA; 1; 12	BRA; 2; 17		13th	172
2023	Pole Motorsport	Chevrolet Cruze	GOI; 1 Ret	GOI; 2 Ret	INT; 1; 29	INT; 2; 2	TAR; 1; 6	TAR; 2; 9	CAS; 1; 8	CAS; 2; 3	INT; 1; 15	INT; 2; 12	VCA; 1; 6	VCA; 2; 7	GOI; 1; 5	GOI; 2; 2	VEL; 1; 12	VEL; 2; 17	BUE; 1; 7	BUE; 2; 3	VCA; 1; 7	VCA; 2; 23	CAS; 1; 7	CAS; 2; 13	INT; 1; 4	INT; 2; 20	6th	263
