= ThreeBond Racing =

Japanese car racing team

Threebond Racing
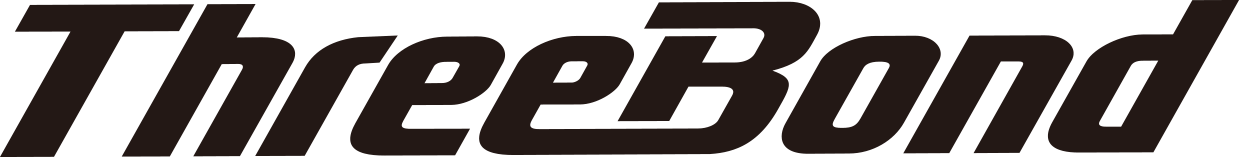
- Founded: 2000
- Team principal(s): Koudai Tsukakoshi
- Current series: Super Formula
- Former series: Asian Formula Three Championship
- Current drivers: Atsushi Miyake
- Teams' Championships: 2005 Asian Formula Three Championship
- Drivers' Championships: 2005 Asian Formula Three Championship

ThreeBond Co., Ltd. is a company headquartered in Hachioji, Tokyo, that develops and manufactures chemical products such as adhesives. The company also have a racing team under the name ThreeBond Racing.

== History ==
=== Japanese Formula 3 ===
In 2017, Michigami's Drago Corse teamed up with ThreeBond to race in Japanese Formula 3 Championship, and entered the under the name ThreeBond Racing with Drago Corse. The team competed until 2019 in the series, achieving good results with Alex Palou in their first season by clinching third in the standings. Ukyo Sasahara clinched third as well in 2018. For 2019, Hiroki Otsu returned to the series, alongside Ai Miura.

=== Super Formula ===
In 2020, Drago Corse returned to the championship in partnership with ThreeBond. This marked the team's first appearance in the championship since 2016. Tatiana Calderón moved to the revived Drago Corse team from the FIA Formula 2 Championship, becoming the first female driver in the current Super Formula era. Koudai Tsukakoshi replaced Calderón for a couple of rounds when Calderón was unable to enter Japan during the pandemic border restrictions. In 2022, 2021 Super Formula Championship runner-up Nirei Fukuzumi moved to the team, replacing Calderón, who departed the series after making nine starts across two seasons.

For 2023, ThreeBond acquired the team's entry and rebranded it as ThreeBond Racing. Drago Corse still ran the team as Michigami was still the team manager. Honda's junior programme boss Masakazu Abe serves as team director, while Koudai Tsukakoshi joined the squad in an advisory role. They signed Atsushi Miyake to replace KCMG-bound Nirei Fukuzumi. For 2025 ThreeBond discontinued their partnership with Drago Corse, as Michigami's role was replaced by Tsukakoshi.
