= 2016 Super GT Series =

Japanese motorsport championship

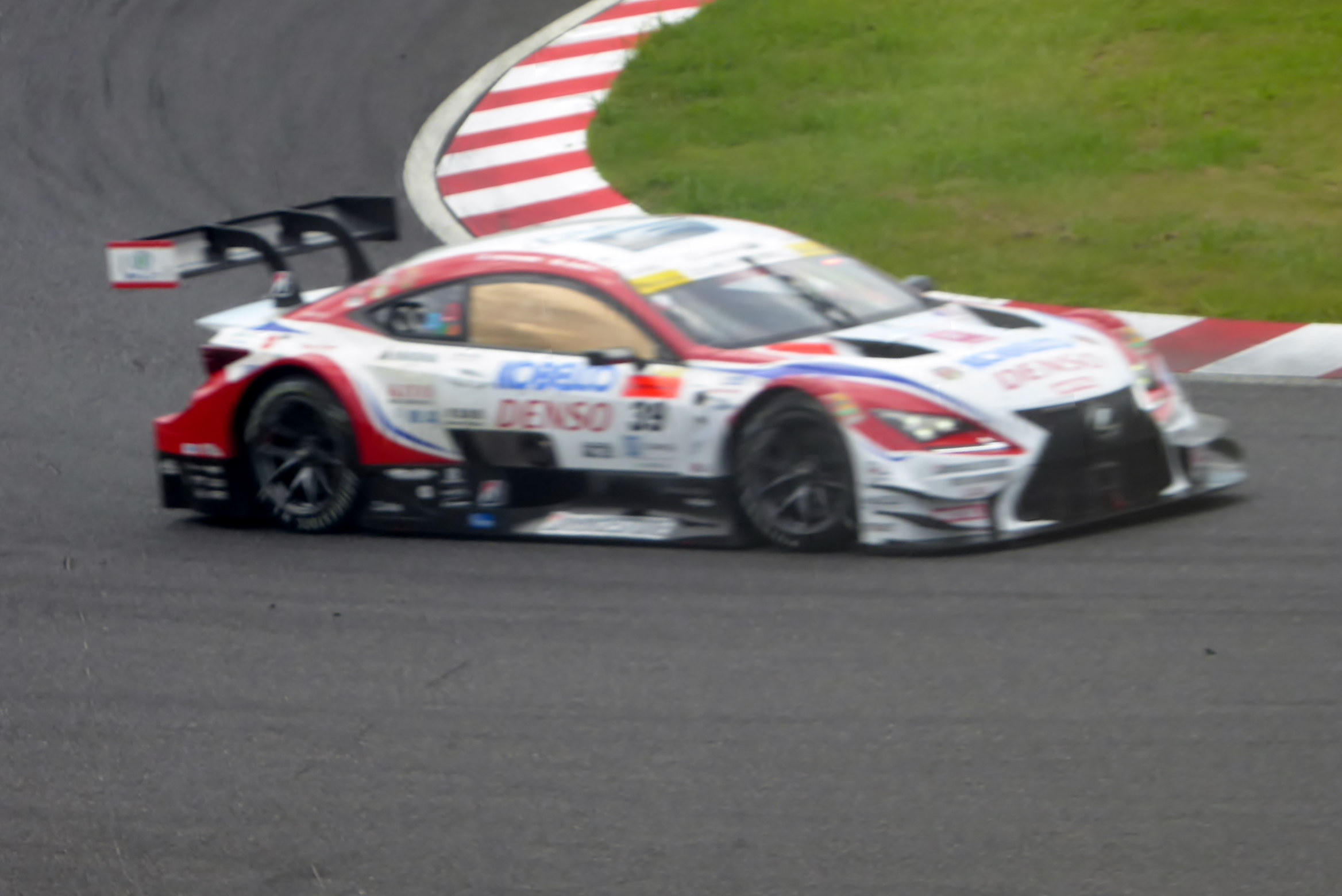
2016 GT500 champions, #39 Denso Kobelco SARD Lexus RC F.

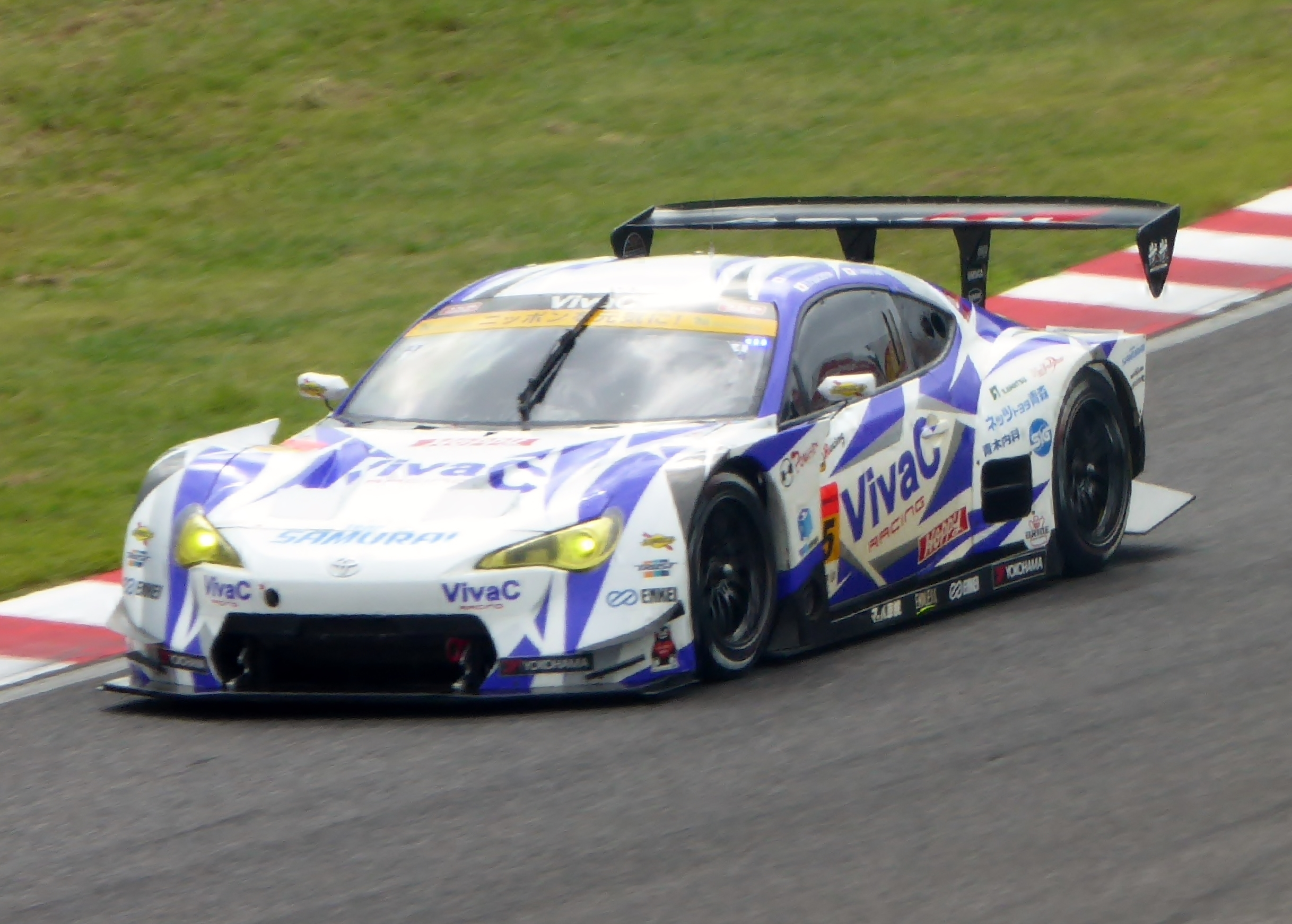
2016 GT300 champions, #25 VivaC Team Tsuchiya Toyota 86 MC.

The 2016 Autobacs Super GT Series was the twenty-fourth season of the Japan Automobile Federation Super GT Championship including the All Japan Grand Touring Car Championship (JGTC) era, and the twelfth season under the name Super GT. It was the thirty-fourth overall season of a national JAF sportscar championship dating back to the All Japan Sports Prototype Championship. The season began on April 10 and ended on November 13, after 8 races.

== Schedule ==
Round	Race	Circuit	Date
1	Okayama GT; 300 km	(Japan) Okayama International Circuit	April 10
2	Fuji GT; 500 km	(Japan) Fuji Speedway	May 4
3	Sugo GT; 300 km	(Japan) Sportsland SUGO	July 24
4	Fuji GT; 300 km	(Japan) Fuji Speedway	August 7
5	45th International Suzuka 1000km 1000 km	(Japan) Suzuka Circuit	August 28
6	Buriram United Super GT Race; 300 km	(Thailand) Chang International Circuit	October 9
7	Motegi GT; 250 km I	(Japan) Twin Ring Motegi	November 12
8	Motegi GT; 250 km II	(Japan) Twin Ring Motegi	November 13

=== Calendar changes ===
- The Super GT in Kyushu 300km at Autopolis was scheduled for May 22nd as the third round of the season but was subsequently cancelled in the aftermath of the 2016 Kumamoto earthquakes. On May 20, series organizers announced that the final weekend at Twin Ring Motegi would host two 250 kilometer races, with the race on Saturday being promoted as "Round 3" of the championship as it replaces the Autopolis race.
- The SUGO GT 300km was brought forward to July from its previous date in September.
- The overseas round at Buriram, Thailand was moved from its 2015 date of June to October. The series first visited the circuit in October 2014.

2016 Japanese venues	2016 International venue

== Drivers and teams ==
=== GT500 ===
Team	Make	Car	Engine	No.	Drivers	Tyre	Rounds
(Japan) Nismo	Nissan	Nissan GT-R NISMO GT500	Nissan NR20A 2.0 L Turbo I4	1	(Japan) Tsugio Matsuda	MI	All
(Japan) Nismo	Nissan	Nissan GT-R NISMO GT500	Nissan NR20A 2.0 L Turbo I4	1	(Italy) Ronnie Quintarelli	MI	All
(Japan) Lexus Team LeMans WAKO'S	Lexus	Lexus RC F GT500	Lexus RI4AG 2.0 L Turbo I4	6	(Italy) Andrea Caldarelli	B	All
(Japan) Lexus Team LeMans WAKO'S	Lexus	Lexus RC F GT500	Lexus RI4AG 2.0 L Turbo I4	6	(Japan) Kazuya Oshima	B	All
(Japan) Autobacs Racing Team Aguri	Honda	Honda NSX Concept-GT	Honda HR-414E 2.0 L Turbo I4	8	(Japan) Kosuke Matsuura	B	All
(Japan) Autobacs Racing Team Aguri	Honda	Honda NSX Concept-GT	Honda HR-414E 2.0 L Turbo I4	8	(Japan) Tomoki Nojiri	B	All
(Japan) Team Impul	Nissan	Nissan GT-R NISMO GT500	Nissan NR20A 2.0 L Turbo I4	12	(Brazil) João Paulo de Oliveira	B	All
(Japan) Team Impul	Nissan	Nissan GT-R NISMO GT500	Nissan NR20A 2.0 L Turbo I4	12	(Japan) Hironobu Yasuda	B	All
(Japan) Drago Modulo Honda Racing	Honda	Honda NSX Concept-GT	Honda HR-414E 2.0 L Turbo I4	15	(Japan) Hideki Mutoh	B	All
(Japan) Drago Modulo Honda Racing	Honda	Honda NSX Concept-GT	Honda HR-414E 2.0 L Turbo I4	15	(United Kingdom) Oliver Turvey	B	1–2, 4–6
(Japan) Drago Modulo Honda Racing	Honda	Honda NSX Concept-GT	Honda HR-414E 2.0 L Turbo I4	15	(Japan) Tadasuke Makino	B	3, 7–8
(Japan) Keihin Real Racing	Honda	Honda NSX Concept-GT	Honda HR-414E 2.0 L Turbo I4	17	(Japan) Takashi Kogure	B	All
(Japan) Keihin Real Racing	Honda	Honda NSX Concept-GT	Honda HR-414E 2.0 L Turbo I4	17	(Japan) Koudai Tsukakoshi	B	All
(Japan) Lexus Team WedsSport Bandoh	Lexus	Lexus RC F GT500	Lexus RI4AG 2.0 L Turbo I4	19	(Japan) Yuji Kunimoto	Y	All
(Japan) Lexus Team WedsSport Bandoh	Lexus	Lexus RC F GT500	Lexus RI4AG 2.0 L Turbo I4	19	(Japan) Yuhi Sekiguchi	Y	All
(Japan) Kondo Racing	Nissan	Nissan GT-R NISMO GT500	Nissan NR20A 2.0 L Turbo I4	24	(Japan) Daiki Sasaki	Y	All
(Japan) Kondo Racing	Nissan	Nissan GT-R NISMO GT500	Nissan NR20A 2.0 L Turbo I4	24	(Japan) Masataka Yanagida	Y	All
(Japan) Lexus Team TOM'S	Lexus	Lexus RC F GT500	Lexus RI4AG 2.0 L Turbo I4	36	(New Zealand) Nick Cassidy	B	All
(Japan) Lexus Team TOM'S	Lexus	Lexus RC F GT500	Lexus RI4AG 2.0 L Turbo I4	36	(Japan) Daisuke Ito	B	All
(Japan) Lexus Team TOM'S	Lexus	Lexus RC F GT500	Lexus RI4AG 2.0 L Turbo I4	37	(Japan) Ryō Hirakawa	B	All
(Japan) Lexus Team TOM'S	Lexus	Lexus RC F GT500	Lexus RI4AG 2.0 L Turbo I4	37	(United Kingdom) James Rossiter	B	All
(Japan) Lexus Team ZENT Cerumo	Lexus	Lexus RC F GT500	Lexus RI4AG 2.0 L Turbo I4	38	(Japan) Hiroaki Ishiura	B	All
(Japan) Lexus Team ZENT Cerumo	Lexus	Lexus RC F GT500	Lexus RI4AG 2.0 L Turbo I4	38	(Japan) Yuji Tachikawa	B	All
(Japan) Lexus Team SARD	Lexus	Lexus RC F GT500	Lexus RI4AG 2.0 L Turbo I4	39	(Japan) Kohei Hirate	B	All
(Japan) Lexus Team SARD	Lexus	Lexus RC F GT500	Lexus RI4AG 2.0 L Turbo I4	39	(Finland) Heikki Kovalainen	B	All
(Japan) MOLA	Nissan	Nissan GT-R NISMO GT500	Nissan NR20A 2.0 L Turbo I4	46	(Japan) Satoshi Motoyama	MI	All
(Japan) MOLA	Nissan	Nissan GT-R NISMO GT500	Nissan NR20A 2.0 L Turbo I4	46	(Japan) Katsumasa Chiyo	MI	1–4, 6–8
(Japan) MOLA	Nissan	Nissan GT-R NISMO GT500	Nissan NR20A 2.0 L Turbo I4	46	(Japan) Mitsunori Takaboshi	MI	5
(Japan) Nakajima Racing	Honda	Honda NSX Concept-GT	Honda HR-414E 2.0 L Turbo I4	64	(Belgium) Bertrand Baguette	D	All
(Japan) Nakajima Racing	Honda	Honda NSX Concept-GT	Honda HR-414E 2.0 L Turbo I4	64	(Japan) Daisuke Nakajima	D	All
(Japan) Team Kunimitsu	Honda	Honda NSX Concept-GT	Honda HR-414E 2.0 L Turbo I4	100	(Japan) Takuya Izawa	B	All
(Japan) Team Kunimitsu	Honda	Honda NSX Concept-GT	Honda HR-414E 2.0 L Turbo I4	100	(Japan) Naoki Yamamoto	B	All

=== GT300 ===
Team	Make	Car	Engine	No.	Drivers	Tyre	Rounds
(Japan) GAINER	Nissan	Nissan GT-R GT3	Nissan VR38DETT 3.8 L Twin Turbo V6	0	(Macau) André Couto	D	All
(Japan) GAINER	Nissan	Nissan GT-R GT3	Nissan VR38DETT 3.8 L Twin Turbo V6	0	(Japan) Ryuichiro Tomita	D	All
(Japan) GAINER	Mercedes-AMG	Mercedes-AMG GT3	Mercedes-AMG M159 6.2 L V8	11	(Japan) Katsuyuki Hiranaka	D	All
(Japan) GAINER	Mercedes-AMG	Mercedes-AMG GT3	Mercedes-AMG M159 6.2 L V8	11	(Sweden) Björn Wirdheim	D	All
(Japan) Cars Tokai Dream28	Lotus	Lotus Evora MC GT300	GTA V8 4.5 L V8	2	(Japan) Hiroki Katoh	Y	All
(Japan) Cars Tokai Dream28	Lotus	Lotus Evora MC GT300	GTA V8 4.5 L V8	2	(Japan) Kazuho Takahashi	Y	All
(Japan) Cars Tokai Dream28	Lotus	Lotus Evora MC GT300	GTA V8 4.5 L V8	2	(Japan) Tadasuke Makino	Y	6
(Japan) NDDP Racing	Nissan	Nissan GT-R GT3	Nissan VR38DETT 3.8 L Twin Turbo V6	3	(Japan) Kazuki Hoshino	Y	All
(Japan) NDDP Racing	Nissan	Nissan GT-R GT3	Nissan VR38DETT 3.8 L Twin Turbo V6	3	(United Kingdom) Jann Mardenborough	Y	All
(Japan) Goodsmile Racing & Team Ukyo	Mercedes-AMG	Mercedes-AMG GT3	Mercedes-AMG M159 6.2 L V8	4	(Japan) Tatsuya Kataoka	Y	All
(Japan) Goodsmile Racing & Team Ukyo	Mercedes-AMG	Mercedes-AMG GT3	Mercedes-AMG M159 6.2 L V8	4	(Japan) Nobuteru Taniguchi	Y	All
(Japan) Team Mach	Toyota	Toyota 86 MC GT300	GTA V8 4.5 L V8	5	(Japan) Tetsuji Tamanaka	Y	1–3, 6, 8
(Japan) Team Mach	Toyota	Toyota 86 MC GT300	GTA V8 4.5 L V8	5	(Japan) Junichirō Yamashita	Y	1–2, 4–6
(Japan) Team Mach	Toyota	Toyota 86 MC GT300	GTA V8 4.5 L V8	5	(Japan) Masami Kageyama	Y	2, 3–6, 8
(Japan) BMW Team Studie	BMW	BMW M6 GT3	BMW P63 4.4 L Twin Turbo V8	7	(Japan) Seiji Ara	Y	All
(Japan) BMW Team Studie	BMW	BMW M6 GT3	BMW P63 4.4 L Twin Turbo V8	7	(Germany) Jörg Müller	Y	All
(Japan) BMW Team Studie	BMW	BMW M6 GT3	BMW P63 4.4 L Twin Turbo V8	7	(Brazil) Augusto Farfus	Y	6
(Japan) Gulf Racing with Pacific	Porsche	Porsche 911 GT3 R	Porsche M97/80 4.0 L F6	9	(Japan) Ryohei Sakaguchi	Y	All
(Japan) Gulf Racing with Pacific	Porsche	Porsche 911 GT3 R	Porsche M97/80 4.0 L F6	9	(Japan) Hiroki Yoshida	Y	All
(Japan) Gulf Racing with Pacific	Porsche	Porsche 911 GT3 R	Porsche M97/80 4.0 L F6	9	(Belgium) Dylan Derdaele	Y	2
(Japan) Team Up Garage with Bandoh	Toyota	Toyota 86 MC GT300	GTA V8 4.5 L V8	18	(Japan) Yuhki Nakayama	Y	All
(Japan) Team Up Garage with Bandoh	Toyota	Toyota 86 MC GT300	GTA V8 4.5 L V8	18	(Japan) Shinnosuke Yamada	Y	All
(Japan) Audi Sport Team Hitotsuyama	Audi	Audi R8 LMS	Audi DAR 5.2 L V10	21	(Japan) Tomonobu Fujii	D	All
(Japan) Audi Sport Team Hitotsuyama	Audi	Audi R8 LMS	Audi DAR 5.2 L V10	21	(United Kingdom) Richard Lyons	D	All
(Japan) R'Qs Motor Sports	Mercedes-Benz	Mercedes-Benz SLS AMG GT3	Mercedes-Benz M159 6.2 L V8	22	(Japan) Masaki Jyonai	Y	All
(Japan) R'Qs Motor Sports	Mercedes-Benz	Mercedes-Benz SLS AMG GT3	Mercedes-Benz M159 6.2 L V8	22	(Japan) Hisashi Wada	Y	All
(Japan) R'Qs Motor Sports	Mercedes-Benz	Mercedes-Benz SLS AMG GT3	Mercedes-Benz M159 6.2 L V8	22	(Japan) Tohjirō Azuma		6
(Japan) VivaC Team Tsuchiya	Toyota	Toyota 86 MC GT300	GTA V8 4.5 L V8	25	(Japan) Takamitsu Matsui	Y	All
(Japan) VivaC Team Tsuchiya	Toyota	Toyota 86 MC GT300	GTA V8 4.5 L V8	25	(Japan) Takeshi Tsuchiya	Y	All
(Japan) VivaC Team Tsuchiya	Toyota	Toyota 86 MC GT300	GTA V8 4.5 L V8	25	(Japan) Kenta Yamashita	Y	6
(Japan) Team Taisan SARD	Audi	Audi R8 LMS ultra (Rd. 1) Audi R8 LMS (Rd. 2-6, 8)	Audi DAR 5.2 L V10	26	(Japan) Shōgo Mitsuyama	Y	1–2, 4–6
(Japan) Team Taisan SARD	Audi	Audi R8 LMS ultra (Rd. 1) Audi R8 LMS (Rd. 2-6, 8)	Audi DAR 5.2 L V10	26	(Japan) Yuya Motojima	Y	1–6, 8
(Japan) Team Taisan SARD	Audi	Audi R8 LMS ultra (Rd. 1) Audi R8 LMS (Rd. 2-6, 8)	Audi DAR 5.2 L V10	26	(Japan) Tsubasa Kondo	Y	3, 8
(Japan) Team Taisan SARD	Audi	Audi R8 LMS ultra (Rd. 1) Audi R8 LMS (Rd. 2-6, 8)	Audi DAR 5.2 L V10	26	(Japan) Shinji Nakano	Y	6
(Thailand) Vattana Motorsport	BMW	BMW M6 GT3	BMW P63 4.4 L Twin Turbo V8	28	(Thailand) Chonsawat Asavahame	Y	7
(Thailand) Vattana Motorsport	BMW	BMW M6 GT3	BMW P63 4.4 L Twin Turbo V8	28	(Australia) Morgan Haber	Y	7
(Japan) apr	Toyota	Toyota Prius apr GT	Toyota RV8KLM 3.4 L Hybrid V8	30	(Japan) Hiroaki Nagai	Y	All
(Japan) apr	Toyota	Toyota Prius apr GT	Toyota RV8KLM 3.4 L Hybrid V8	30	(Japan) Kōta Sasaki	Y	All
(Japan) apr	Toyota	Toyota Prius apr GT	Toyota RV8KLM 3.4 L Hybrid V8	31	(Japan) Yūichi Nakayama	B	All
(Japan) apr	Toyota	Toyota Prius apr GT	Toyota RV8KLM 3.4 L Hybrid V8	31	(Japan) Kōki Saga	B	All
(Japan) Excellence Porsche Team KTR	Porsche	Porsche 911 GT3 R	Porsche M97/80 4.0 L F6	33	(Japan) Naoya Yamano	Y	All
(Japan) Excellence Porsche Team KTR	Porsche	Porsche 911 GT3 R	Porsche M97/80 4.0 L F6	33	(Germany) Jörg Bergmeister	Y	1–3, 7–8
(Japan) Excellence Porsche Team KTR	Porsche	Porsche 911 GT3 R	Porsche M97/80 4.0 L F6	33	(Germany) Tim Bergmeister	Y	4
(Japan) Excellence Porsche Team KTR	Porsche	Porsche 911 GT3 R	Porsche M97/80 4.0 L F6	33	(Japan) Yūya Sakamoto	Y	5–6
Toyota Team Thailand	Toyota	Toyota 86 MC GT300	GTA V8 4.5 L V8	35	(Thailand) Nattavude Charoensukhawatana	Y	7
Toyota Team Thailand	Toyota	Toyota 86 MC GT300	GTA V8 4.5 L V8	35	(Thailand) Piti Bhirombhakdi	Y	7
(Japan) Dijon Racing	Nissan	Nissan GT-R GT3	Nissan VR38DETT 3.8 L Twin Turbo V6	48	(Japan) Hiroshi Takamori	Y	1-2, 4, 6
(Japan) Dijon Racing	Nissan	Nissan GT-R GT3	Nissan VR38DETT 3.8 L Twin Turbo V6	48	(Japan) Masaki Tanaka	Y	1–2, 6
(Japan) Dijon Racing	Nissan	Nissan GT-R GT3	Nissan VR38DETT 3.8 L Twin Turbo V6	48	(Japan) Takayuki Aoki	Y	2–6, 8
(Japan) Dijon Racing	Nissan	Nissan GT-R GT3	Nissan VR38DETT 3.8 L Twin Turbo V6	48	(Japan) Mitsunori Takaboshi	Y	3, 5, 8
(Japan) Arnage Racing	Mercedes-Benz	Mercedes-Benz SLS AMG GT3	Mercedes-Benz M159 6.2 L V8	50	(Japan) Rintaro Kubo	Y	All
(Japan) Arnage Racing	Mercedes-Benz	Mercedes-Benz SLS AMG GT3	Mercedes-Benz M159 6.2 L V8	50	(Japan) Hideto Yasuoka	Y	All
(Japan) Arnage Racing	Mercedes-Benz	Mercedes-Benz SLS AMG GT3	Mercedes-Benz M159 6.2 L V8	50	(Japan) Masaki Kanō	Y	2
(Japan) LM corsa	Ferrari	Ferrari 488 GT3	Ferrari F154CB 3.9 L Twin Turbo V8	51	(Japan) Morio Nitta	Y	All
(Japan) LM corsa	Ferrari	Ferrari 488 GT3	Ferrari F154CB 3.9 L Twin Turbo V8	51	(Japan) Akihiro Tsuzuki	Y	All
(Japan) LM corsa	Ferrari	Ferrari 488 GT3	Ferrari F154CB 3.9 L Twin Turbo V8	51	(Japan) Shigekazu Wakisaka	Y	2, 6
(Japan) LM corsa	Lexus	Lexus RC F GT3	Lexus 2UR-GSE 5.3 L V8	60	(Japan) Akira Iida	Y	All
(Japan) LM corsa	Lexus	Lexus RC F GT3	Lexus 2UR-GSE 5.3 L V8	60	(Japan) Hiroki Yoshimoto	Y	All
(Japan) LM corsa	Lexus	Lexus RC F GT3	Lexus 2UR-GSE 5.3 L V8	60	(Germany) Dominik Farnbacher	Y	6
(Japan) Autobacs Racing Team Aguri	BMW	BMW M6 GT3	BMW P63 4.4 L Twin Turbo V8	55	(Japan) Takashi Kobayashi	B	All
(Japan) Autobacs Racing Team Aguri	BMW	BMW M6 GT3	BMW P63 4.4 L Twin Turbo V8	55	(Japan) Shinichi Takagi	B	All
(Japan) R&D Sport	Subaru	Subaru BRZ GT300	Subaru EJ20 2.0 L Turbo F4	61	(Japan) Takuto Iguchi	D	All
(Japan) R&D Sport	Subaru	Subaru BRZ GT300	Subaru EJ20 2.0 L Turbo F4	61	(Japan) Hideki Yamauchi	D	All
(Japan) Lamborghini Team Direction	Lamborghini	Lamborghini Huracán GT3	Lamborghini DFJ 5.2 L V10	63	(Japan) Naoki Yokomizo	Y	All
(Japan) Lamborghini Team Direction	Lamborghini	Lamborghini Huracán GT3	Lamborghini DFJ 5.2 L V10	63	(South Africa) Adrian Zaugg	Y	All
(Japan) K2 R&D LEON Racing	Mercedes-AMG	Mercedes-AMG GT3	Mercedes-AMG M159 6.2 L V8	65	(Japan) Naoya Gamou	Y	All
(Japan) K2 R&D LEON Racing	Mercedes-AMG	Mercedes-AMG GT3	Mercedes-AMG M159 6.2 L V8	65	(Japan) Haruki Kurosawa	Y	All
(Japan) JLOC	Lamborghini	Lamborghini Huracán GT3	Lamborghini DFJ 5.2 L V10	87	(Japan) Shinya Hosokawa	Y	All
(Japan) JLOC	Lamborghini	Lamborghini Huracán GT3	Lamborghini DFJ 5.2 L V10	87	(Japan) Kimiya Satō	Y	All
(Japan) JLOC	Lamborghini	Lamborghini Huracán GT3	Lamborghini DFJ 5.2 L V10	87	(Japan) Taiyō Iida	Y	2, 6
(Japan) JLOC	Lamborghini	Lamborghini Huracán GT3	Lamborghini DFJ 5.2 L V10	88	(Japan) Kazuki Hiramine	Y	All
(Japan) JLOC	Lamborghini	Lamborghini Huracán GT3	Lamborghini DFJ 5.2 L V10	88	(Japan) Manabu Orido	Y	All
(Japan) Lamborghini Team Direction Shift	Lamborghini	Lamborghini Huracán GT3	Lamborghini DFJ 5.2 L V10	108	(Japan) Kyosuke Mineo		1–3, 5–6, 8
(Japan) Lamborghini Team Direction Shift	Lamborghini	Lamborghini Huracán GT3	Lamborghini DFJ 5.2 L V10	108	(Italy) Kei Cozzolino	Y	1–2
(Japan) Lamborghini Team Direction Shift	Lamborghini	Lamborghini Huracán GT3	Lamborghini DFJ 5.2 L V10	108	(New Zealand) Jono Lester	Y	5–6
(Japan) Lamborghini Team Direction Shift	Lamborghini	Lamborghini Huracán GT3	Lamborghini DFJ 5.2 L V10	108	(Japan) Hironori Takeuchi	Y	3, 6, 8
(Japan) Rn-sports	Mercedes-AMG	Mercedes-AMG GT3	Mercedes-AMG M159 6.2 L V8	111	(Japan) Kazuya Tsuruta	Y	All
(Japan) Rn-sports	Mercedes-AMG	Mercedes-AMG GT3	Mercedes-AMG M159 6.2 L V8	111	(Japan) Masayuki Ueda	Y	All
(Japan) Rn-sports	Mercedes-AMG	Mercedes-AMG GT3	Mercedes-AMG M159 6.2 L V8	111	(Japan) Keishi Ishikawa	Y	6
(Japan) Tomei Sports	Nissan	Nissan GT-R GT3	Nissan VR38DETT 3.8 L Twin Turbo V6	360	(Japan) Yusaku Shibata	Y	1–6, 8
(Japan) Tomei Sports	Nissan	Nissan GT-R GT3	Nissan VR38DETT 3.8 L Twin Turbo V6	360	(Japan) Atsushi Tanaka	Y	1–3, 5–6, 8
(Japan) Tomei Sports	Nissan	Nissan GT-R GT3	Nissan VR38DETT 3.8 L Twin Turbo V6	360	(Japan) Shōta Kiyohara	Y	2, 4, 6

== Driver changes ==
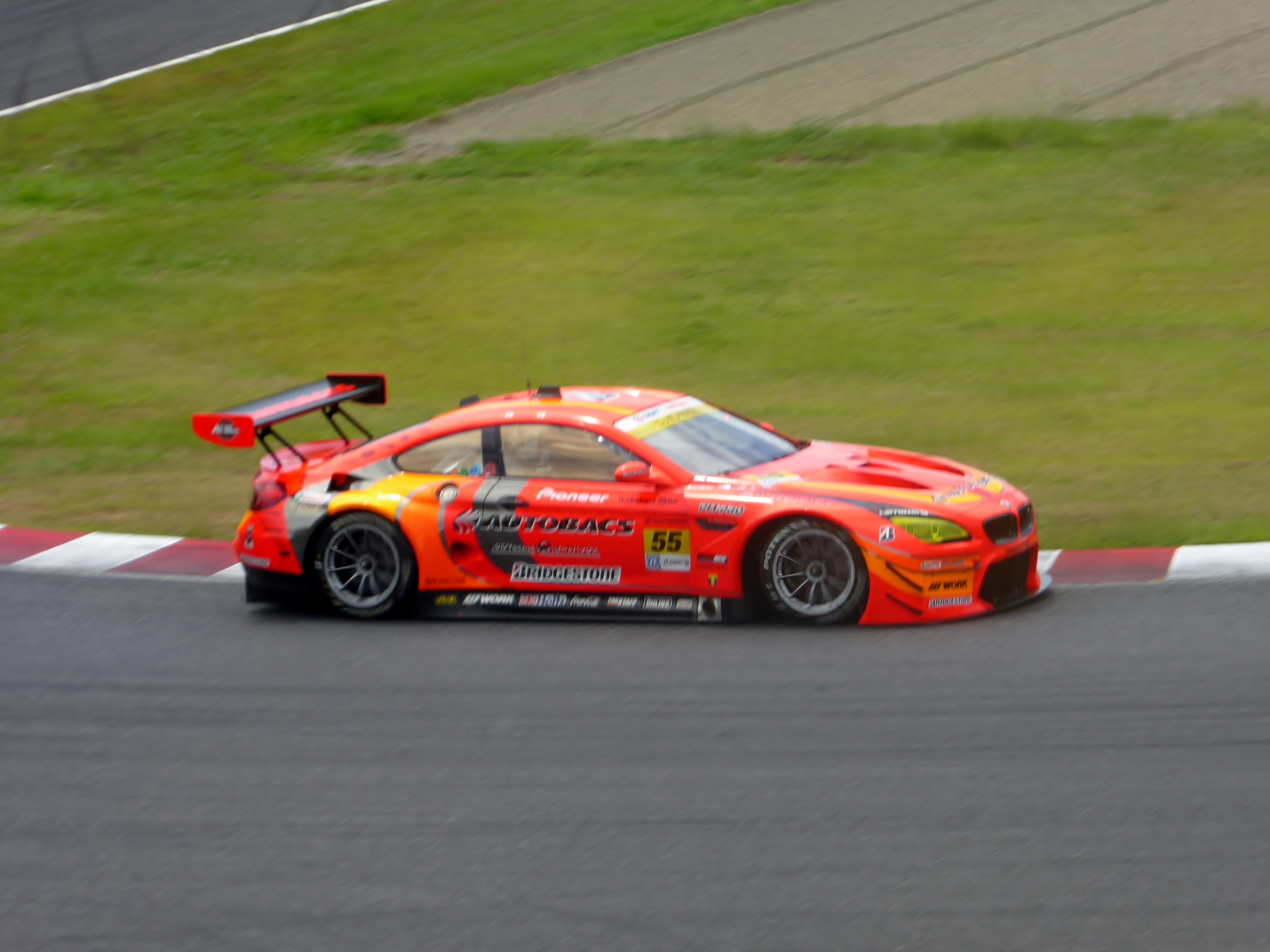
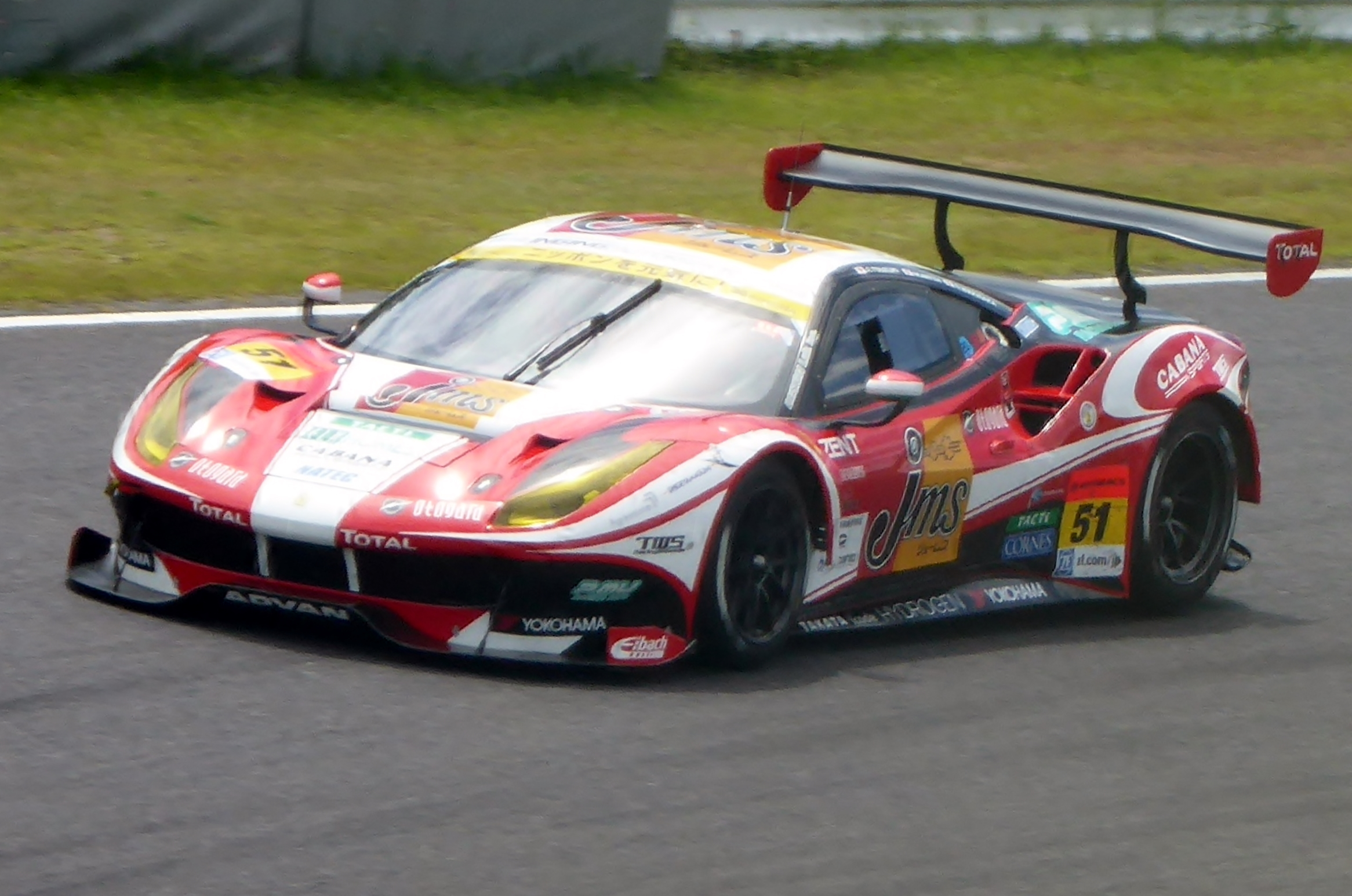
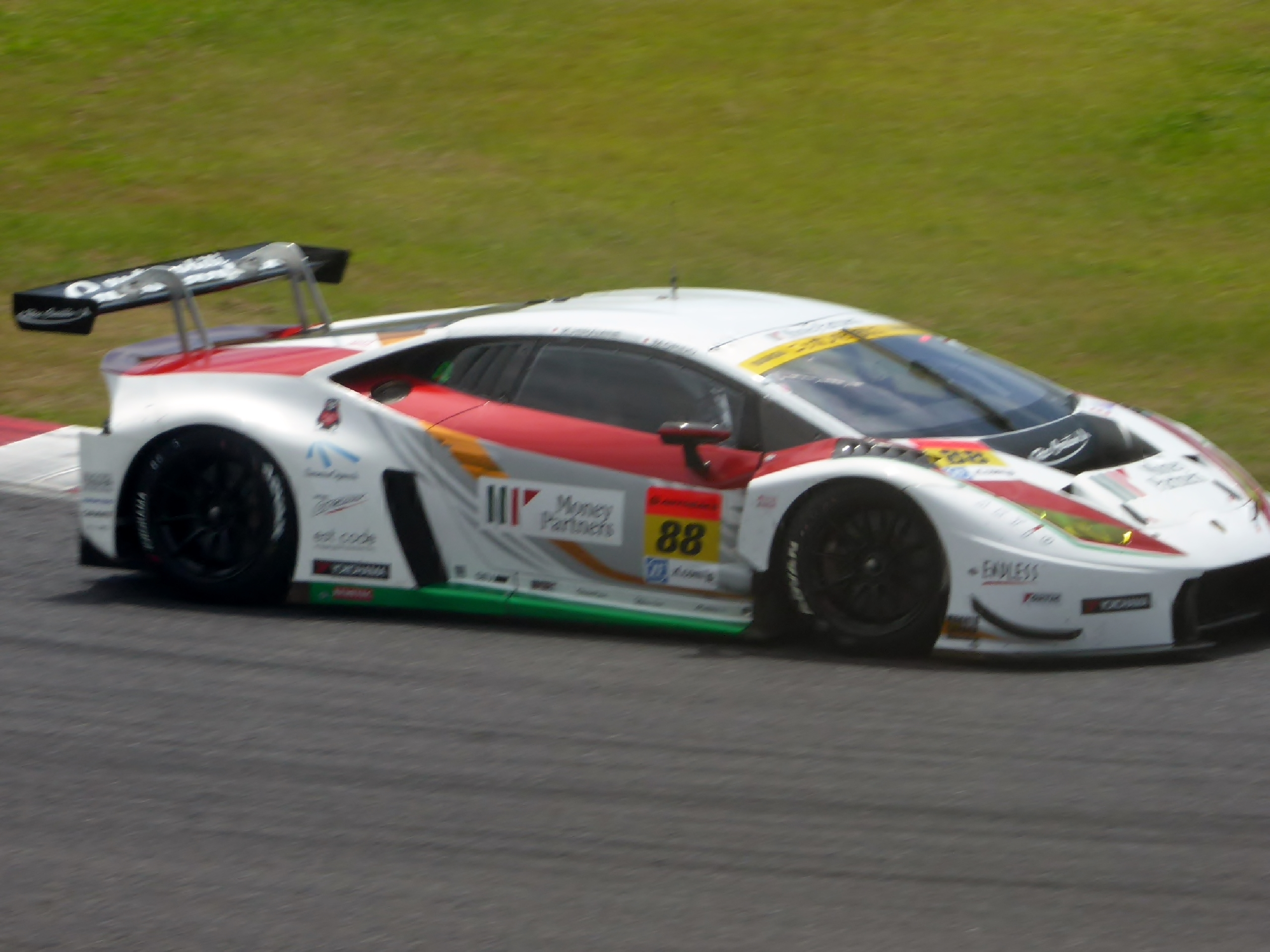
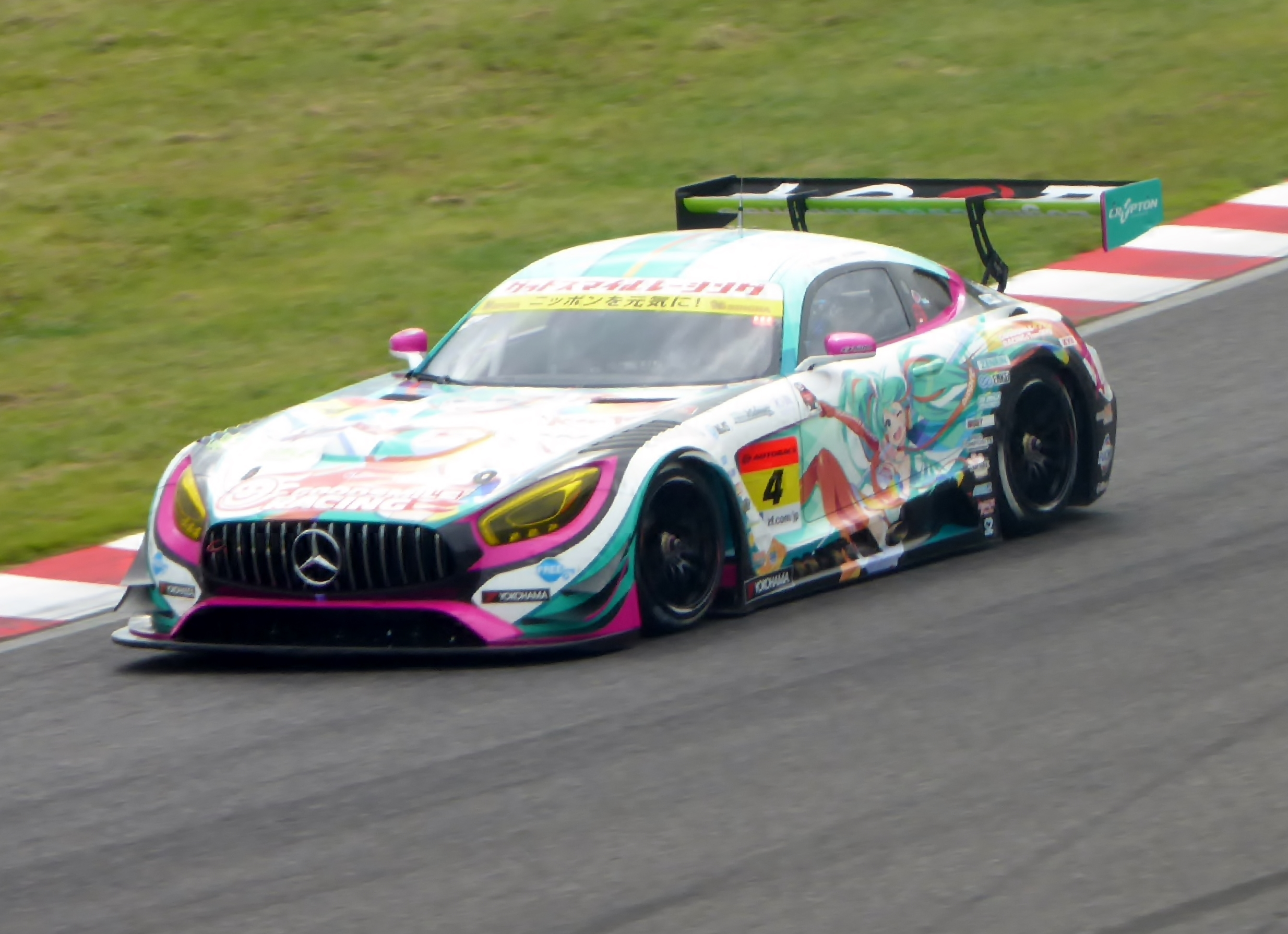
The BMW M6 GT3 (top-left), Ferrari 488 GT3 (top-right), Lamborghini Huracán GT3 (bottom-left), and Mercedes-AMG GT3 (bottom-right) all made their debuts in the GT300 class this season.

=== Vehicle changes ===
- Goodsmile Racing with Team UKYO, the number 11 GAINER, K2 R&D LEON Racing, and Rn-sports fielded the new Mercedes-AMG GT3.
- apr fielded two new Toyota Prius GTs, with the number 31 car on Bridgestone tyres, and the number 30 on Yokohama tyres.
- Audi Team Hitotsuyama debuted the second-generation Audi R8 LMS and switched from Yokohama to Dunlop Tyres.
- BMW Team Studie and Autobacs Racing Team Aguri used the new BMW M6 GT3 in 2016. ARTA switched to BMW after the retirement of their previous Honda CR-Z, while Studie received additional support from BMW.
- Excellence Porsche Team KTR fielded the new 911 GT3-R, and received additional support from Porsche.
- LM Corsa's number 51 team switched from BMW to the new Ferrari 488 GT3. The number 60 team continued to use the Lexus RC-F GT3.
- JLOC was one of two teams introducing the Lamborghini Huracán GT3 to Super GT in 2016.

=== Driver Changes ===
==== GT500 ====
- Toyota:
  - Petrochemical company WAKO's replaced Eneos as the title sponsor of Team Le Mans. Andrea Caldarelli switched from the KeePer TOM's team to the Wako's LeMans team.
  - Three-time GT500 champion Juichi Wakisaka announced his retirement from racing at the Toyota Gazoo Racing press conference on February 4. He will stay in the series as the team principal of Lexus Team Wako's LeMans. Yuji Kunimoto moved over from Team LeMans to drive for the WedsSport BANDOH team fill the seat from Wakisaka.
  - Two-time and defending 1000 km Suzuka winner James Rossiter switched from the Petronas TOM's team to the KeePer TOM's team. Reigning Japanese Formula 3 champion Nick Cassidy joined the number 36 TOM's team. He was the first driver from New Zealand to race in the series since Mark Porter in 1998. Au replaced Petronas as the title sponsor of the number 36 TOM'S RC-F.
- Honda:
  - Takashi Kogure and Hideki Mutoh swapped seats within the Honda fleet. Mutoh moved to Drago Modulo Honda Racing alongside Oliver Turvey, while Kogure joined Koudai Tsukakoshi at Keihin Real Racing.
- Nissan:
  - Katsumasa Chiyo stepped up to the GT500 class for 2016 driving for MOLA, after helping GAINER secure their first GT300 championship last season.
  - Masataka Yanagida moved from MOLA to Kondo Racing, his third different team in four seasons.
  - Forum Engineering took over from D'Station as the title sponsor of Kondo Racing. Former GT500 champion Michael Krumm had no plans to race in Super GT in 2016 after competing for Kondo Racing last season.

==== GT300 ====
- After participating in selected rounds last year, Ryuichiro Tomita became a full-time driver of the #0 GAINER Nissan GT-R.
- Kota Sasaki drove a second Toyota Prius GT for apr.
- Mitsunori Takaboshi left the series after a successful rookie season with NDDP to drive in Blancpain GT. However, he returned for the fourth race of the season at Fuji Speedway. GT Academy champion and Nissan factory driver Jann Mardenborough joined the NDDP team, partnering Kazuki Hoshino.
- Former Rolex 24 champion Jörg Bergmeister joined Excellence Porsche Team KTR on a full-time basis, after driving two rounds for the team in 2014.
- WEC LMP1 driver Pierre Kaffer drove for Audi Team Braille in his debut GT300 campaign.
- Porsche Carrera Cup Japan champion Yuya Motojima, as well as fellow PCCJ drivers Rintaro Kubo and Hiroaki Nagai, moved to GT300, driving for Team Taisan SARD, Arnage Racing, and apr respectively.
- Shinnosuke Yamada graduated from the F4 Japanese Championship to race for Team Upgarage with Bandoh.
- South African Adrian Zaugg and Japanese-Italian driver Kei Cozzolino made their Super GT debuts for Lamborghini Team Direction.
- Inaugural GT Academy champion Lucas Ordóñez returned to racing in Europe, competing in the Blancpain GT Series for NISMO RJN Motorsport.
- Alexandre Imperatori left Super GT to focus on his World Endurance Championship campaign with Rebellion Racing.
- Former 24h Nürburgring winner Christian Mamerow did not return to the series after running a partial campaign with Audi Team Racing Tech.
- EVA Racing became the primary sponsor of the Rn-sports AMG.
- Gulf Racing merged with Pacific Racing Team to form Gulf Racing with PACIFIC, fielding an all-new Porsche 911 GT3-R.
- Direction Racing changed their name to Lamborghini Team Direction, and also fielded two Huracán GT3s.
- Before the start of the season, an entry was announced for Audi Team Braille, with a new 2016 Audi R8 LMS and veteran World Endurance Championship driver Pierre Kaffer. However, the team never appeared in the 2016 season.
- After withdrawing from the 2015 season, Team Taisan returned to GT300 in alliance with SARD.

==== Mid-season changes ====
- From the second round, Team Taisan SARD switched to a 2016 model Audi R8 LMS.

== Results ==
Round	Circuit	Date	Class	Pole position	Race winner
1	(Japan) Okayama International Circuit; Report	10 April	GT500	No. 37 Lexus Team KeePer TOM'S	No. 1 Nismo
1	(Japan) Okayama International Circuit; Report	10 April	GT500	(United Kingdom) James Rossiter (Japan) Ryō Hirakawa	(Japan) Tsugio Matsuda (Italy) Ronnie Quintarelli
1	(Japan) Okayama International Circuit; Report	10 April	GT300	No. 25 VivaC team Tsuchiya	No. 65 K2 R&D LEON Racing
1	(Japan) Okayama International Circuit; Report	10 April	GT300	(Japan) Takamitsu Matsui (Japan) Takeshi Tsuchiya	(Japan) Naoya Gamou (Japan) Haruki Kurosawa
2	(Japan) Fuji Speedway; Report	4 May	GT500	No. 12 Team Impul	No. 1 Nismo
2	(Japan) Fuji Speedway; Report	4 May	GT500	(Japan) Hironobu Yasuda (Brazil) João Paulo de Oliveira	(Japan) Tsugio Matsuda (Italy) Ronnie Quintarelli
2	(Japan) Fuji Speedway; Report	4 May	GT300	No. 55 ARTA	No. 3 NDDP Racing
2	(Japan) Fuji Speedway; Report	4 May	GT300	(Japan) Takashi Kobayashi (Japan) Shinichi Takagi	(Japan) Kazuki Hoshino (United Kingdom) Jann Mardenborough
3	(Japan) Sportsland SUGO; Report	24 July	GT500	No. 6 Lexus Team LeMans WAKO'S	No. 24 Kondo Racing
3	(Japan) Sportsland SUGO; Report	24 July	GT500	(Italy) Andrea Caldarelli (Japan) Kazuya Oshima	(Japan) Daiki Sasaki (Japan) Masataka Yanagida
3	(Japan) Sportsland SUGO; Report	24 July	GT300	No. 25 VivaC team Tsuchiya	No. 31 apr
3	(Japan) Sportsland SUGO; Report	24 July	GT300	(Japan) Takamitsu Matsui (Japan) Takeshi Tsuchiya	(Japan) Yuichi Nakayama (Japan) Koki Saga
4	(Japan) Fuji Speedway; Report	7 August	GT500	No. 12 Team Impul	No. 12 Team Impul
4	(Japan) Fuji Speedway; Report	7 August	GT500	(Japan) Hironobu Yasuda (Brazil) João Paulo de Oliveira	(Japan) Hironobu Yasuda (Brazil) João Paulo de Oliveira
4	(Japan) Fuji Speedway; Report	7 August	GT300	No. 55 ARTA	No. 55 ARTA
4	(Japan) Fuji Speedway; Report	7 August	GT300	(Japan) Takashi Kobayashi (Japan) Shinichi Takagi	(Japan) Takashi Kobayashi (Japan) Shinichi Takagi
5	(Japan) Suzuka Circuit; Report	28 August	GT500	No. 15 Drago Modulo Honda Racing	No. 38 Lexus Team ZENT Cerumo
5	(Japan) Suzuka Circuit; Report	28 August	GT500	(Japan) Hideki Mutoh (United Kingdom) Oliver Turvey	(Japan) Hiroaki Ishiura (Japan) Yuji Tachikawa
5	(Japan) Suzuka Circuit; Report	28 August	GT300	No. 18 Team UpGarage with Bandoh	No. 61 R&D Sport
5	(Japan) Suzuka Circuit; Report	28 August	GT300	(Japan) Yuhki Nakayama (Japan) Shinnosuke Yamada	(Japan) Takuto Iguchi (Japan) Hideki Yamauchi
6	(Thailand) Chang International Circuit; Report	9 October	GT500	No. 19 Lexus Team WedsSport Bandoh	No. 19 Lexus Team WedsSport Bandoh
6	(Thailand) Chang International Circuit; Report	9 October	GT500	(Japan) Yuji Kunimoto (Japan) Yuhi Sekiguchi	(Japan) Yuji Kunimoto (Japan) Yuhi Sekiguchi
6	(Thailand) Chang International Circuit; Report	9 October	GT300	No. 25 VivaC team Tsuchiya	No. 25 VivaC team Tsuchiya
6	(Thailand) Chang International Circuit; Report	9 October	GT300	(Japan) Takamitsu Matsui (Japan) Takeshi Tsuchiya	(Japan) Takamitsu Matsui (Japan) Takeshi Tsuchiya
7	(Japan) Twin Ring Motegi; Report	12 November	GT500	No. 39 Lexus Team SARD	No. 24 Kondo Racing
7	(Japan) Twin Ring Motegi; Report	12 November	GT500	(Japan) Kohei Hirate (Finland) Heikki Kovalainen	(Japan) Daiki Sasaki (Japan) Masataka Yanagida
7	(Japan) Twin Ring Motegi; Report	12 November	GT300	No. 11 GAINER	No. 21 Audi Team Hitotsuyama
7	(Japan) Twin Ring Motegi; Report	12 November	GT300	(Japan) Katsuyuki Hiranaka (Sweden) Björn Wirdheim	(Japan) Tomonobu Fujii (United Kingdom) Richard Lyons
8	(Japan) Twin Ring Motegi; Report	13 November	GT500	No. 39 Lexus Team SARD	No. 39 Lexus Team SARD
8	(Japan) Twin Ring Motegi; Report	13 November	GT500	(Japan) Kohei Hirate (Finland) Heikki Kovalainen	(Japan) Kohei Hirate (Finland) Heikki Kovalainen
8	(Japan) Twin Ring Motegi; Report	13 November	GT300	No. 31 apr	No. 25 VivaC team Tsuchiya
8	(Japan) Twin Ring Motegi; Report	13 November	GT300	(Japan) Yuichi Nakayama (Japan) Koki Saga	(Japan) Takamitsu Matsui (Japan) Takeshi Tsuchiya

== Championship standings ==
Scoring system

Position	1st	2nd	3rd	4th	5th	6th	7th	8th	9th	10th	Pole
Points	20	15	11	8	6	5	4	3	2	1	1
Suzuka	25	18	13	10	8	6	5	4	3	2	1

=== Drivers' championships ===
==== GT500 ====
Driver Ranking GT500 2016 Series
Rank	Driver	No.	OKA (Japan)	FUJ (Japan)	SUG (Japan)	FUJ (Japan)	SUZ (Japan)	CHA (Thailand)	MOT (Japan)	MOT (Japan)	Pts.
1	(Finland) Heikki Kovalainen (Japan) Kohei Hirate	39	7	2	2	8	8	7	2	1	82
2	(Japan) Kazuya Oshima (Italy) Andrea Caldarelli	6	4	5	4	9	4	3	4	2	69
3	(Japan) Tsugio Matsuda (Italy) Ronnie Quintarelli	1	1	1	9	4	6	14	9	7	62
4	(Japan) Yuhi Sekiguchi (Japan) Yuji Kunimoto	19	9	8	5	10	5	1	5	3	58
5	(Japan) Daisuke Ito (New Zealand) Nick Cassidy	36	8	4	11	5	2	11	3	4	54
6	(Japan) Yuji Tachikawa (Japan) Hiroaki Ishiura	38	6	14	3	7	1	15	6	9	52
7	(Japan) Daiki Sasaki (Japan) Masataka Yanagida	24	13	9	1	Ret	12	13	1	10	43
8	(Japan) Hironobu Yasuda (Brazil) João Paulo de Oliveira	12	5	11	Ret	1	Ret	4	7	8	43
9	(Japan) Ryō Hirakawa (United Kingdom) James Rossiter	37	2	3	8	12	Ret	9	Ret	5	38
10	(Japan) Satoshi Motoyama	46	3	7	13	Ret	3	12	8	6	36
11	(Japan) Koudai Tsukakoshi (Japan) Takashi Kogure	17	11	12	6	2	10	6	Ret	11	27
12	(Japan) Katsumasa Chiyo	46	3	7	13	Ret		12	8	6	23
13	(Japan) Hideki Mutoh	15	12	13	7	Ret	Ret	2	12	15	20
14	(Japan) Naoki Yamamoto (Japan) Takuya Izawa	100	10	Ret	10	3	7	10	10	12	20
15	(Japan) Kosuke Matsuura (Japan) Tomoki Nojiri	8	Ret	6	14	6	9	8	11	13	16
16	(Japan) Tadasuke Makino	15						2	12	15	15
17	(Japan) Mitsunori Takaboshi	46					3				13
18	(Japan) Daisuke Nakajima (Belgium) Bertrand Baguette	64	14	10	12	11	11	5	13	14	7
19	(United Kingdom) Oliver Turvey	15	12	13	7	Ret	Ret				5
Rank	Driver	No.	OKA (Japan)	FUJ (Japan)	SUG (Japan)	FUJ (Japan)	SUZ (Japan)	CHA (Thailand)	MOT (Japan)	MOT (Japan)	Pts.

Colour	Result
Gold	Winner
Silver	Second place
Bronze	Third place
Green	Points classification
Blue	Non-points classification
Blue	Non-classified finish (NC)
Purple	Retired, not classified (Ret)
Red	Did not qualify (DNQ)
Red	Did not pre-qualify (DNPQ)
Black	Disqualified (DSQ)
White	Did not start (DNS)
White	Withdrew (WD)
White	Race cancelled (C)
Blank	Did not practice (DNP)
Blank	Did not arrive (DNA)
Blank	Excluded (EX)

==== GT300 ====
Driver Ranking GT300 2016 Series
Rank	Driver	No.	OKA (Japan)	FUJ (Japan)	SUG (Japan)	FUJ (Japan)	SUZ (Japan)	CHA (Thailand)	MOT (Japan)	MOT (Japan)	Pts.
1	(Japan) Takeshi Tsuchiya (Japan) Takamitsu Matsui	25	6	3	2	13	22	1	7	1	78
2	(Japan) Kōki Saga (Japan) Yūichi Nakayama	31	12	20	1	25	2	5	24	2	60
3	(Japan) Tomonobu Fujii (United Kingdom) Richard Lyons	21	7	7	Ret	2	6	24	1	4	57
4	(Japan) Kazuki Hoshino (United Kingdom) Jann Mardenborough	3	10	1	5	6	10	2	13	6	52
5	(Japan) Shinichi Takagi (Japan) Takashi Kobayashi	55	11	2	Ret	1	14	3	Ret	DNS	48
6	(Japan) Takuto Iguchi (Japan) Hideki Yamauchi	61	23	11	3	3	1	Ret	23	13	47
7	(Japan) Nobuteru Taniguchi (Japan) Tatsuya Kataoka	4	2	18	7	5	5	8	18	3	47
8	(Macau) Andre Couto (Japan) Ryuichiro Tomita	0	8	5	11	9	3	4	5	15	38
9	(Japan) Katsuyuki Hiranaka (Sweden) Bjorn Wirdheim	11	4	Ret	4	7	Ret	9	4	10	32
10	(Japan) Naoya Yamano	33	22	23	14	24	7	7	2	5	30
11	(Japan) Kazuki Hiramine (Japan) Manabu Orido	88	9	25	6	4	9	10	3	Ret	30
12	(Japan) Haruki Kurosawa (Japan) Naoya Gamou	65	1	Ret	16	23	8	11	9	24	26
13	(Germany) Jörg Bergmeister	33	22	23				7	2	5	25
14	(Japan) Yuhki Nakayama (Japan) Shinnosuke Yamada	18	15	4	8	10	4	22	12	9	25
15	(Japan) Seiji Ara (Germany) Jörg Müller	7	3	24	10	20	DNS	6	15	12	17
16	(Japan) Morio Nitta (Japan) Akihiro Tsuzuki	51	5	6	9	11	11	12	11	Ret	13
17	(Japan) Yūya Motojima	26	20	15	19	8	20		6	7	12
18	(Japan) Tsubasa Kondō	26							6	7	9
19	(Japan) Shinya Hosokawa (Japan) Kimiya Satō	87	13	8	22	19	17	21	8	11	6
20	(Japan) Shigekazu Wakisaka	51		6			11				5
21	(Japan) Yūya Sakamoto	33				24	7				5
22	(Japan) Ryōhei Sakaguchi (Japan) Hiroki Yoshida	9	DNS	Ret	13	21	13	17	22	8	3
23	(Japan) Shōgo Mitsuyama	26	20	15	19	8	20				3
24	(Japan) Hiroaki Nagai (Japan) Kōta Sasaki	30	14	9	18	15	24	14	16	17	2
25	(Japan) Takayuki Aoki	48		10	17	12	21		10	14	2
26	(Japan) Masaki Tanaka	48	27	10			21				1
27	(Japan) Hiroshi Takamori	48	27	10	17		21				1
28	(Japan) Mitsunori Takaboshi	48				12			10	14	1
–	(Japan) Yūsaku Shibata	360	26	16	12	Ret	12		25	22	0
–	(Japan) Shōta Kiyohara	360		16	12		12				0
–	(Japan) Rintaro Kubo (Japan) Hideto Yasuoka	50	18	12	Ret	16	16	15	26	19	0
–	(Japan) Atsushi Tanaka	360	26	16		Ret	12		25	22	0
–	(Japan) Masaki Kanō	50		12			16				0
–	(Japan) Naoki Yokomizo (South Africa) Adrian Zaugg	63	21	19	15	18	25	13	14	16	0
–	(Japan) Hiroki Katoh (Japan) Kazuho Takahashi	2	17	13	23	Ret	Ret		19	Ret	0
–	(Japan) Kazuya Tsuruta (Japan) Masayuki Ueda	111	24	14	21	22	15	16	17	20	0
–	(Japan) Masami Kageyama	5		22	Ret	14	Ret		Ret	23	0
–	(Japan) Junichirō Yamashita	5		22	Ret	14	Ret				0
–	(Germany) Tim Bergmeister	33			14						0
–	(Japan) Keishi Ishikawa	111					15				0
–	(Japan) Kyosuke Mineo	108	16	17			19		27	18	0
–	(Italy) Kei Cozzolino	108	16	17							0
–	(Japan) Akira Iida (Japan) Hiroki Yoshimoto	60	25	21	Ret	17	18	23	20	Ret	0
–	(Japan) Taiyō Iida	87					17				0
–	(Japan) Hironori Takeuchi	108					19		27	18	0
–	(Thailand) Nattavude Charoensukhawatana (Thailand) Piti Bhirombhakdi	35						18			0
–	(Germany) Dominik Farnbacher	60					18				0
–	(Japan) Masaki Jyonai (Japan) Hisashi Wada	22	19	Ret	20	Ret	23	19	21	21	0
–	(New Zealand) Jono Lester	108					19				0
–	(Japan) Shinji Nakano	26					20				0
–	(Thailand) Chonsawat Asavahame (Australia) Morgan Haber	28						20			0
–	(Japan) Tetsuji Tamanaka	5		22			Ret		Ret	23	0
–	(Japan) Kenta Yamashita	25					22				0
–	(Japan) Tohjirō Azuma	22					23				0
–	(Japan) Tadasuke Makino	2					Ret				0
–	(Belgium) Dylan Derdaele	9		Ret							0
–	(Brazil) Augusto Farfus	7					DNS				–
Rank	Driver	No.	OKA (Japan)	FUJ (Japan)	SUG (Japan)	FUJ (Japan)	SUZ (Japan)	CHA (Thailand)	MOT (Japan)	MOT (Japan)	Pts.

=== Teams championships ===
==== GT500 Teams' standings ====
Rank	Team	No.	OKA (Japan)	FUJ (Japan)	SUG (Japan)	FUJ (Japan)	SUZ (Japan)	CHA (Thailand)	MOT (Japan)	MOT (Japan)	Pts.
1	Lexus Team SARD	39	7	2	2	8	8	7	2	1	103
2	Lexus Team LeMans WAKO'S	6	4	5	4	9	4	3	4	2	92
3	Nismo	1	1	1	9	4	6	14	9	7	83
4	Lexus Team WedsSport Bandoh	19	9	8	5	10	5	1	5	3	79
5	Lexus Team au TOM'S	36	8	4	11	5	2	11	3	4	78
6	Lexus Team ZENT Cerumo	38	6	14	3	7	1	15	6	9	72
7	Kondo Racing	24	13	9	1	Ret	12	13	1	10	57
8	Team Impul	12	5	11	Ret	1	Ret	4	7	8	57
9	MOLA	46	3	7	13	Ret	3	12	8	6	54
10	Lexus Team KeePer TOM'S	37	2	3	8	12	Ret	9	Ret	5	53
11	Keihin Real Racing	17	11	12	6	2	10	6	Ret	11	43
12	Team Kunimitsu	100	10	Ret	10	3	7	10	10	12	39
13	Autobacs Racing Team Aguri	8	Ret	6	14	6	9	8	11	13	33
14	Drago Modulo Honda Racing	15	12	13	7	Ret	Ret	2	12	15	32
15	Nakajima Racing	64	14	10	12	11	11	5	13	14	22
Rank	Team	No.	OKA (Japan)	FUJ (Japan)	SUG (Japan)	FUJ (Japan)	SUZ (Japan)	CHA (Thailand)	MOT (Japan)	MOT (Japan)	Pts.

==== GT300 Teams' standings ====
Rank	Team	No.	OKA (Japan)	FUJ (Japan)	SUG (Japan)	FUJ (Japan)	SUZ (Japan)	CHA (Thailand)	MOT (Japan)	MOT (Japan)	Pts.
1	VivaC team Tsuchiya	25	6	3	2	13	22	1	7	1	97
2	apr	31	12	20	1	25	2	5	24	2	77
3	Audi Team Hitotsuyama	21	7	7	Ret	2	6	24	1	4	76
4	NDDP Racing	3	10	1	5	6	10	2	13	6	76
5	Goodsmile Racing & Team Ukyo	4	2	18	7	5	5	8	18	3	69
6	R&D Sport	61	23	11	3	3	1	Ret	23	13	62
7	Gainer	0	8	5	11	9	3	4	5	15	62
8	Autobacs Racing Team Aguri	55	11	2	Ret	1	14	3	Ret	DNS	59
9	Gainer	11	4	Ret	4	7	Ret	9	4	10	49
10	Excellence Porsche Team KTR	33	22	23	14	24	7	7	2	5	48
11	JLOC	88	9	25	6	4	9	10	3	Ret	47
12	Team Up Garage with Bandoh	18	15	4	8	10	4	22	12	9	46
13	K2 R&D Leon Racing	65	1	Ret	16	23	8	11	9	24	43
14	BMW Team Studie	7	3	24	10	20	DNS	6	15	12	34
15	LM corsa	51	5	6	9	11	11	12	11	Ret	32
16	Team Taisan SARD	26	20	15	19	8	20		6	7	27
17	JLOC	87	13	8	22	19	17	21	8	11	22
18	apr	30	14	9	18	15	24	14	16	17	22
19	Lamborghini Team Direction	63	21	19	15	18	25	13	14	16	20
20	Dijon Racing	48	27	10	17	12	21		10	14	17
21	Gulf Racing with Pacific	9	DNS	Ret	13	21	13	17	22	8	15
22	Arnage Racing	50	18	12	Ret	16	16	15	26	19	15
23	Rn-sports	111	24	14	21	22	15	16	17	20	14
24	R'QS Motorsports	22	19	Ret	20	Ret	23	19	21	21	12
25	Tomei Sports	360	26	16	12	Ret	12		25	22	10
26	LM corsa	60	25	21	Ret	17	18	23	20	Ret	10
27	Lamborghini Team Direction Shift	108	16	17			19		27	18	9
28	Cars Tokai Dream28	2	17	13	23	Ret	Ret		19	Ret	8
29	Team Mach	5	DNS	22	Ret	14	Ret		Ret	23	5
-	Toyota Team Thailand	35						18			0
-	Vattana Motorsport	28						20			0
Rank	Team	No.	OKA (Japan)	FUJ (Japan)	SUG (Japan)	FUJ (Japan)	SUZ (Japan)	CHA (Thailand)	MOT (Japan)	MOT (Japan)	Pts.
