= Super GT =

Sports car racing series in Japan

- Category: Sports car racing
- Country: Japan; Malaysia (2005–2013, 2025); Thailand (2014–2019)
- Inaugural season: 1993 (as JGTC); 2005 (as Super GT)
- Teams: 15 (GT500); 28 (GT300); 43 (total)
- Tyre suppliers: Bridgestone; Dunlop; Michelin; Yokohama
- Drivers' champion: GT500: (Japan) Naoki Yamamoto (Japan) Tadasuke Makino; GT300: (Brazil) João Paulo de Oliveira (Japan) Iori Kimura
- Makes' champion: GT500: Honda; GT300: Nissan
- Teams' champion: GT500: Stanley Team Kunimitsu; GT300: Kondo Racing
- Official website: SuperGT.net

Super GT (stylized as SUPER GT) is a sports car racing series that began in 1993. Launched as the All Japan Grand Touring Car Championship (全日本GT選手権, Zen Nihon GT Senshūken), the series was renamed to Super GT in 2005. It is the top level of sports car racing in Japan.

The series is sanctioned by the Japan Automobile Federation (JAF) and managed by the GT Association (GTA). Autobacs has been the title sponsor of the series and its predecessor since 1998.

== History ==
=== The JGTC years (1993–2004) ===
The JGTC was established in 1993 by the Japan Automobile Federation (JAF), replacing the defunct All Japan Sports Prototype Championship for Group C prototypes and the Japanese Touring Car Championship for Group A touring cars, which instead would adopt the supertouring formula. Seeking to prevent the spiraling budgets and one-team/make domination of both series, JGTC imposed strict limits on power, and heavy weight penalties on race winners, in an openly stated objective to keep on-track action close with an emphasis on keeping fans happy.

The GT Association (GTA) was established in October 1993 to manage the JGTC beginning in 1994. The two-class structure of GT500 and GT300 was introduced, and the series would gain popularity over the years with Nissan, Toyota, and Honda all operating factory efforts in GT500. At the start of the new millennium, the JGTC would expand outside of Japan, adding a round at Sepang International Circuit in Malaysia in 2000, and running a non-championship race at California Speedway in the United States in 2004.

=== Super GT (2005–present) ===
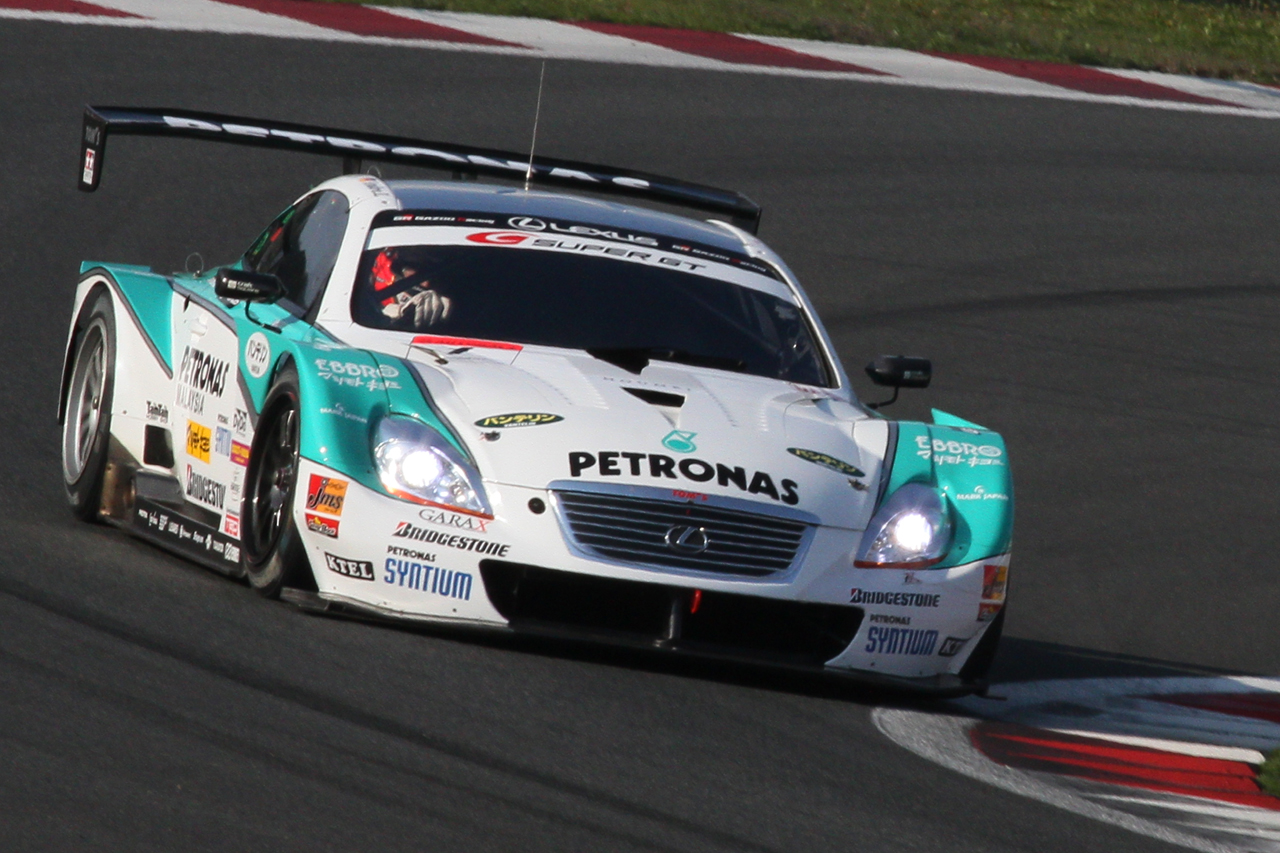
2009 Lexus Petronas Team TOM'S SC 430 GT500 champion.

The JGTC had planned to hold a race during the 2005 season at the Shanghai International Circuit in China, in addition to the existing overseas round at Sepang. However, holding the series in more than two countries would have meant the JGTC would lose its status as a "national championship" under the International Sporting Code of the FIA, and therefore could not keep "All Japan Championship" in its name. The series would instead be classified as an "international championship" by the FIA, and would therefore require direct authorization from it, rather than the JAF.

Initially, JAF announced JGTC would be renamed "Super GT World Challenge" with the goals of "challenge to the world", and "challenge to entertainment"; however, FIA prevented JAF from using it due to confusion of the suffix with "World Championship" (a higher level FIA recognition status) and a dispute with Sports Car Club of America, which ran Speed World Challenge since 1990. On December 10, 2004, it was announced that new name of JGTC was confirmed as "Super GT". However, despite the name change and several attempts at holding a second overseas race, Super GT has continued to only hold one overseas race per year.

In 2014, Super GT and the German touring car series DTM announced the creation of "Class 1", which would unify GT500's and DTM's technical regulations, allowing manufacturers to race in both series with a single specification of car. After some delays, technical regulations were fully aligned in 2020, with the GT500 category fully adopting Class One specifications. By 2021 however, DTM switched to a Group GT3 series due to massive manufacturer exodus. Super GT maintained the current technical regulations for GT500, though the "Class 1" moniker would no longer be used.

== Races ==
Super GT races take place on well-known Japanese race tracks such as Fuji Speedway, Suzuka Circuit, and Mobility Resort Motegi. The series also races at Autopolis in the Kyushu region, Okayama International Circuit in the Chūgoku region, and Sportsland Sugo in the Tōhoku region. Races are typically sprints between 250 and 300 kilometres' distance, with one compulsory pit stop in the middle of the race for driver changes and refuelling. In 2022, the series introduced a new longer-distance format for select races, held over 450 kilometres with two compulsory pit stops. In 2024, the series held its first time-based races, adding three-hour long-distance races to the calendar.

The series had already expanded internationally by the time it was rebranded in 2005. Sepang International Circuit in Malaysia hosted a championship round every year until 2014, when it was replaced by a new event at Chang International Circuit in Buriram, Thailand. Additional overseas races were planned to be held at Shanghai Circuit in 2005, and Yeongam International Circuit in 2013, but both events were cancelled. Buriram and Sepang were both on the 2020 provisional calendar, but both races were cancelled due to the effects of the COVID-19 pandemic. Sepang would return to the calendar in 2025.

The International Suzuka 1000km endurance race in late August was the longest and most prestigious event on the Super GT calendar, from 2006 when it was added as a championship round, until 2017, the final year of the event in its 1000 km format. The Suzuka 1000 km was replaced with the Intercontinental GT Challenge Suzuka 10 Hours in 2018. That year, Super GT revived the Fuji GT 500 Mile Race (805 km) as the series' new endurance round, running in 2018 and 2019.

The Golden Week race at Fuji Speedway, held annually on May 4, is also considered to be the series' most prestigious event. Held during a major public holiday, it regularly draws the largest crowds of any Super GT race, with a two-day attendance of 91,000 spectators in 2019. It was the first event of the first official JGTC season in 1994, and has been a permanent fixture of the series' calendar with the exception of 2004, when the circuit was closed for renovations, and 2020, due to the impact of the COVID-19 pandemic. Traditionally, this event has been run as the Fuji GT 500 km Race, but in 2022, the event was shortened to 450 km (100 laps), and in 2024, it was reformatted into a three-hour timed race.

Due to the effects of the 2009 energy crisis in Japan, the Fuji 500 km and Suzuka 1000 km race distances were shortened. The 2011 Tohoku earthquake and tsunami and its effects resulted in a further reduction in all race distances for the season, before standard distances were restored in 2012.

Non-championship rounds have been run sporadically during Super GT's history. The Fuji Sprint Cup was held from 2010 to 2013, consisting of two sprint races per class. The first annual Super GT x DTM Dream Race was held in November 2019, consisting of two sprint races for GT500 and DTM cars, supported by the auto sport Web Sprint Cup, two sprint races for select GT300 teams as well as one-off GT3 entries from other Japanese events.

== Cars ==
The cars are divided into two classes: GT500 and GT300. The names of the categories derive from their traditional maximum horsepower limit – in the early years of the series, GT500 cars would have no more than 500 horsepower, and GT300 cars would max out at around 300 hp. However, the current generation of GT500 engines produce in excess of 650 horsepower. Meanwhile, in present-day GT300, the horsepower range varies from around 400 to just over 550 horsepower; however, GT300 cars have far less downforce than their GT500 counterparts.

In both groups, the car number is assigned to the team, in which each team is allowed to choose whichever number they want as long as the number isn't already used by any other team. The number assigned to each team is permanent, and may only change hands when the team exits the series. The number 1 is reserved for the defending GT500 champion, and the number 0 is reserved for the reigning GT300 champion.

For easy identification, headlight covers, windshield decals, and number panels are white on GT500 cars, and yellow on GT300 cars.

=== GT500 ===
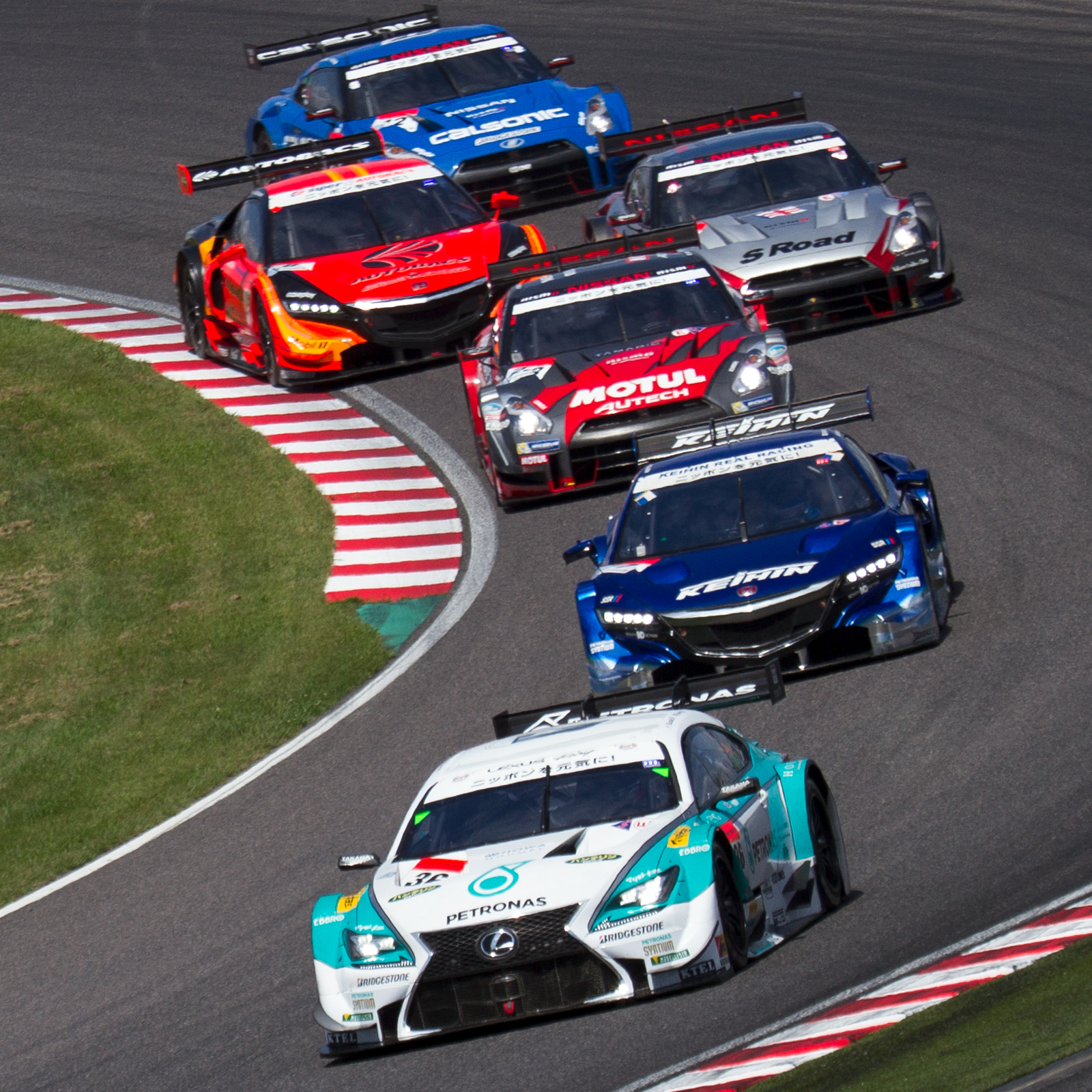
2014 Super GT (GT500), Suzuka Circuit

The top class in Super GT, GT500, is composed entirely of manufacturer-supported teams, representing the three biggest Japanese automobile manufacturers: Toyota, Honda, and Nissan.

Since 2014, GT500 cars have been powered by single-turbocharged, inline four-cylinder engines with two liters of displacement and producing over 650 horsepower. The cars are silhouette racing cars with purpose-built carbon fibre monocoques. The advancements in aerodynamics and horsepower, combined with an ongoing tyre war driving even higher speeds, have made the GT500 class the fastest form of production-based sports car racing today. The pace of a current GT500 car is roughly equivalent to that of the fastest non-hybrid Le Mans Prototypes.

For many years, the Nissan Skyline GT-R, the Toyota Supra (A80), and the Honda NSX (NA1) represented their respective brands in GT500. Today, the three cars competing in GT500 are the Nissan Z (RZ34), the revived Toyota GR Supra, and the Honda Prelude (BF1). Other models, such as the Nissan Fairlady Z (Z33), Lexus SC 430, Lexus RC F, Lexus LC 500, Nissan GT-R, Honda NSX (NC1), and the Honda Civic Type R (FL5) have been used, as well as the Honda HSV-010 GT, a prototype car developed specifically for Super GT with its planned road-going variant having been cancelled.

In the earlier years of the GT500 category, a number of foreign manufacturers also entered cars in the series, with varying success. During the first season, the Ferrari F40, Porsche 911 Turbo, and Porsche 962C all won races. The Porsche 911 GT2 and the BMW-powered McLaren F1 GTR are, to date, the only foreign cars to win the GT500 championship; the 911 GT2 won the teams' title in 1995 (Note: Team Taisan won the 1995 GT1 Teams' Championship with all of its points scored by Porsche 911 GT2s.) and the F1 GTR won both the drivers' and teams' titles in 1996. The longtail version of the F1 GTR would later score a race victory in 2001. The last foreign-built car to enter the series was the Aston Martin DBR9, which fared poorly in its brief run in 2009 – illustrating the overwhelming advantage that newer generations of GT500 cars had over the FIA GT1 category cars that dominated the landscape in Europe. Team Goh, who entered the championship-winning 1996 McLarens, planned to enter a Maserati MC12 GT1 in 2006, but withdrew after pre-season testing for similar reasons.

In 2012, the GT500 regulations were changed in order to provide provisions for four-door vehicles, although none were run until Honda announced that the Civic Type R would replace the outgoing NSX in 2024. In 2010, the front-engine, rear-wheel drive layout became the only permitted layout in the class, prompting Honda to initially replace the first-generation NSX-GT with the HSV-010 GT. In 2014, Honda was granted a waiver to allow the NSX Concept-GT and NSX-GT (both second-generation based models) to run with a mid-engine layout to match the road car's engine position. The waiver expired after the 2019 season with the full implementation of Class 1 technical regulations, after which Honda was required to redesign the NSX-GT to accommodate a front-engine layout.

New GT500 cars were introduced in 2014 in preparation for the future unified Class 1 touring car regulations, including the first car in the class to utilize a KERS-assisted hybrid powertrain, the Honda NSX Concept-GT. Common aerodynamic regulations with the DTM were adopted, as was Class 1's turbocharged four-cylinder engine specification. Furthermore, the 2014 rules overhaul also increased the cars' downforce by 30%, while lowering costs. Aerodynamic development above a "design line" wrapping around the fenders, bumpers, and doorsills was restricted. Over sixty common parts were introduced, including the brakes, diffuser, and rear wing.

In response to increasing cornering speeds, another aerodynamic overhaul was introduced in 2017, lowering downforce by 25%. Furthermore, KERS units were banned, although the only manufacturer to utilize such systems, Honda, had already discontinued their usage in 2016. In 2020, Class 1 technical regulations were fully implemented, with the manufacturers introducing new cars to comply with the new rules. Aerodynamic development was further restricted, and a standardized ECU and suspension were introduced.

Selection	2005	2006	2007	2008	2009	2010	2011	2012	2013	2014	2015	2016	2017	2018	2019	2020	2021	2022	2023	2024	2025	2026
Nissan	Fairlady Z (Z33)			GT-R (R35)														Z GT500 (RZ34)				
Toyota/Lexus	Supra (A80)															GR Supra (DB42)						
Toyota/Lexus		SC 430 (UZZ40)								RC F (USC10)			LC 500 (URZ100)									
Honda	NSX-GT (NA2)					HSV-010 GT				NSX Concept-GT			NSX-GT (NC1)							Civic Type R-GT (FL5)		HRC Prelude-GT (BF1)
McLaren	F1 GTR																					
Lamborghini	Murciélago																					
Ferrari	550 GTS																					
Aston Martin					DBR9																	
Audi															RS5 Turbo							
BMW															M4 Turbo							

==== Cars ====
Make	Car	Years competed	Engine	Image	Note
Aston Martin	Aston Martin DBR9	2009	Aston Martin DBR9 6.0L NA V12		Part-time entry in 2009.
Audi	Audi RS5 Turbo DTM	2019	Audi RC8 2.0 TFSI turbo I4		Only entered in the 2019 Super GT × DTM Dream Race
BMW	BMW M4 Turbo DTM	2019	BMW P48 Turbo 2.0L turbo I4		Only entered in the 2019 Super GT × DTM Dream Race
Ferrari	Ferrari 550 GTS	2005	Ferrari F133 5.9L NA V12		Ex-Prodrive chassis
Honda	Honda NSX-GT (NA2)	2005–2009	Honda C32B; 3.0L turbo V6 (2005 Rd.1–3); 3.5L NA V6 (2005 Rd.4–2008); 3.4L NA V6 (2009)		
Honda	Honda HSV-010 GT	2010–2013	Honda HR10EG 3.4L NA V8		
Honda	Honda NSX Concept-GT	2014–2016	Honda HR-414E 2.0L turbo I4		Equipped with a Zytek battery hybrid powertrain system from 2014 to 2015.
Honda	Honda NSX-GT (NC1)	2017–2021	Honda HR-417E 2.0L turbo I4 (2017–2019); Honda HR-420E 2.0L turbo I4 (2020–present)		Debuted as a mid-engine model in 2017. Changed to a front-engine model in 2020 to comply with current regulations.
Honda	Honda NSX-GT (NC1)	2022–2023	Honda HR-417E 2.0L turbo I4 (2017–2019); Honda HR-420E 2.0L turbo I4 (2020–present)		Updated styling based on Honda NSX Type S model.
Honda	Honda Civic Type R-GT (FL5)	2024–2025	Honda HR-417E 2.0L turbo I4 (2017–2019); Honda HR-420E 2.0L turbo I4 (2020–present)		
Honda	Honda HRC Prelude-GT (BF1)	2026	Honda HR-417E 2.0L turbo I4 (2017–2019); Honda HR-420E 2.0L turbo I4 (2020–present)		
Lamborghini	Lamborghini Murciélago RG-1	2005	Lamborghini L535 6.0L NA V12		Moved to the GT300 class before the end of the 2005 season.
Lexus	Lexus SC430 GT500 (UZZ40)	2006–2013	Lexus 3UZ-FE 4.5L NA V8 (2006–2008); Lexus RV8KG 3.4L NA V8 (2009–2013)		Used by four Toyota teams in 2006, then by all teams from 2007.
Lexus	Lexus RC F GT500 (USC10)	2014–2016	Lexus RI4AG 2.0L turbo I4		
Lexus	Lexus LC 500 GT500 (URZ100)	2017–2019	Lexus RI4AG 2.0L turbo I4		
McLaren	McLaren F1 GTR	2005	BMW S70/2 6.0L NA V12		Part-time entry in 2005.
Nissan	Nissan Fairlady Z GT500 (Z33)	2005–2007	Nissan VQ30DETT 3.0L turbo V6 (2005–2006 Rd.8); Nissan VK45DE 4.5L NA V8 (2006 Rd.9-2007)		
Nissan	Nissan GT-R GT500 (R35)	2008–2013	Nissan VK45DE 4.5L NA V8 (2008–2009); Nissan VRH34A 3.4L NA V8 (2010–2011 Rd.4); Nissan VRH34B 3.4L NA V8 (2011 Rd.5-2013)		
Nissan	Nissan GT-R NISMO GT500 (R35)	2014–2021	Nissan NR20A 2.0L turbo I4 (2014–2019); Nissan NR20B 2.0L turbo I4 (2020); Nissan NR4S21 2.0L turbo I4 (2021)		
Nissan	Nissan Z GT500 (RZ34)	2022–2023	Nissan NR4S21 2.0L turbo I4 (2022–2023)		
Nissan	Nissan Z NISMO GT500 (RZ34)	2024–present	Nissan NR4S24 2.0L turbo I4 (2024) Nissan NR4S25 2.0L turbo I4(2025)		
Toyota	Toyota Supra GT500 (A80)	2005–2006	Toyota 3UZ-FE 4.5L NA V8		Used by two Toyota teams in 2006.
Toyota	Toyota GR Supra GT500 (DB42)	2020–present	Toyota RI4AG 2.0L turbo I4 (2020–2023); Toyota RI4BG 2.0L turbo I4 (2024–present)		

==== Turbocharger ====
The standard turbochargers were introduced from the start of 2014 season. The single-turbocharger configuration produces boost pressure up to 3.5 bar (51 psi). Swiss-American turbocharger company Garrett Advancing Motion, a subsidiary of Honeywell International Inc., currently supplies exclusive turbocharger kits including wastegate (846519-15) for all Super GT GT500 cars.

==== GT500 specifications (2014–present) ====
Engine displacement	2.0 L (122 cu in) DOHC inline-4
Turbocharger	Garrett TR35R 846519–15
Gearbox	6-speed semi-automatic paddle shift gearbox
Weight	Over 1,020 kg (2,249 lb) including driver and fuel
Power output	Approximately 650 hp (485 kW)
Fuel	102 RON unleaded gasoline (2014–2022); ETS Racing Fuels Renewablaze R100 carbon neutral fuel (2023–present)
Fuel capacity	120 litres (32 US gallons; 26 imperial gallons)
Fuel delivery	Direct fuel injection
Aspiration	Single-turbocharged
Length	4,650–4,725 mm (183–186 in) excluding rear wing; 5,010 mm (197 in) including rear wing
Width	1,950 mm (77 in)
Wheelbase	2,750 mm (108 in) fixed
Steering	Servo-assisted rack and pinion
Tire suppliers	Bridgestone, Yokohama, and Dunlop

=== GT300 ===
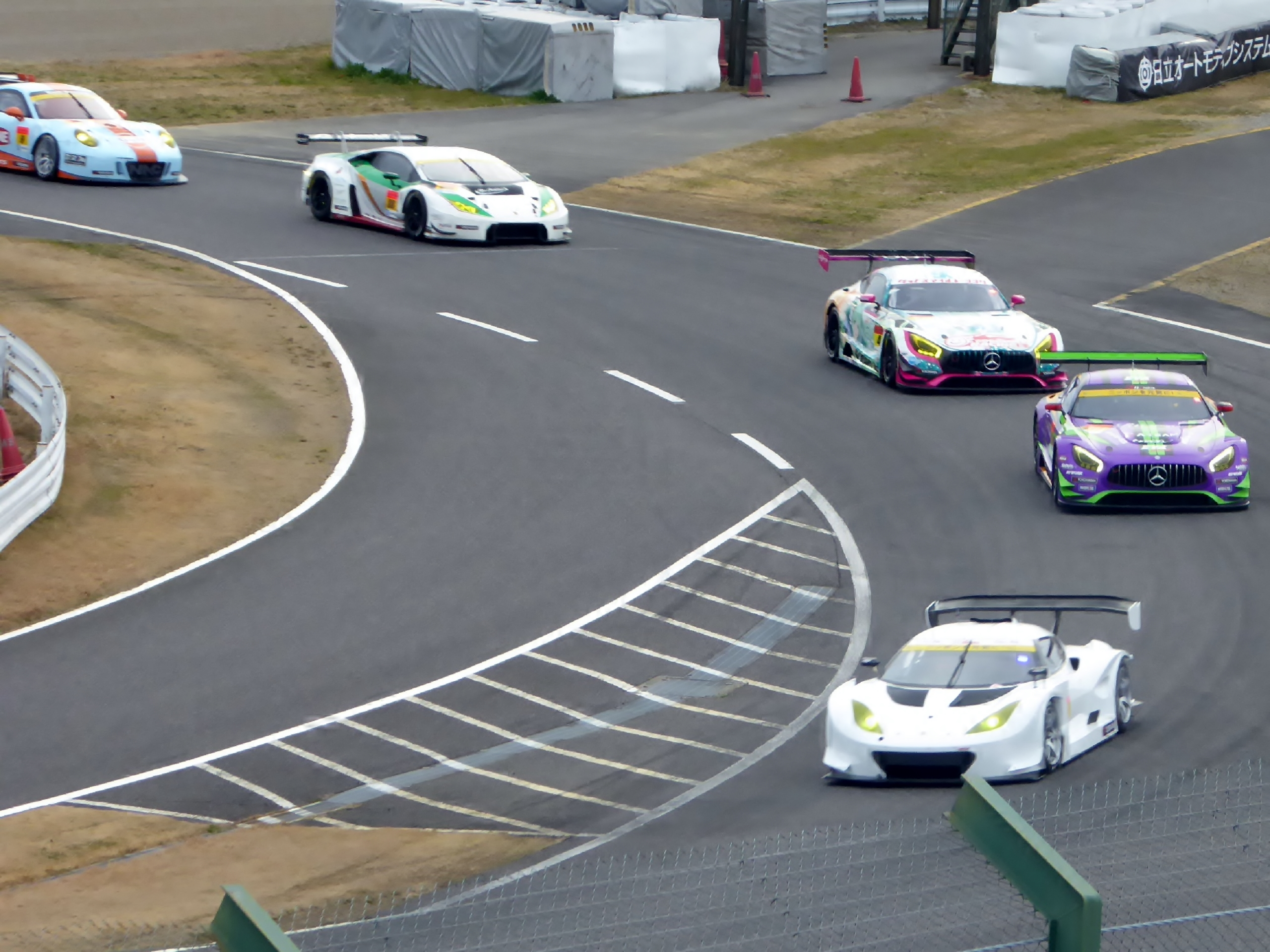
A Lotus Evora MC leads several GT3 cars.

Unlike GT500, both works-backed and independent teams compete in GT300, so the field tends to be much more varied in terms of types of cars entered. As in GT500, the major Japanese automakers participate in this class, entering cars such as the Toyota Prius and Subaru BRZ, which comply with JAF-GT regulations. However, the GT300 class is predominantly composed of GT3-class cars from European manufacturers such as Audi and Mercedes, although Lexus, Nissan and Honda are also represented in the class by GT3 cars. This reflects a growing interest in the series from European manufacturers, with Audi and BMW fielding works-supported entries. Toyota/Lexus, Nissan, and Subaru also campaign works-supported cars in the class.

The GT300 class used to host more exotic cars from the likes of ASL, Mosler, Mooncraft and Vemac, as well as detuned GT500 cars, such as the 2004 title-winning M-TEC NSX. However, starting in 2006, teams increasingly chose to campaign European GT cars instead, a trend that accelerated in 2010 with the introduction of FIA GT cars to the series. In response to the decline of locally produced entries from specialist manufacturers, the GTA worked with Dome to create the "Mother Chassis" (ja: マザーシャシー), a low-cost GT300 platform, with the first MC car entering the series in 2014. Mother Chassis cars utilize a standard Dome-produced tub and GTA-branded Nissan VK45DE engine, while maintaining the appearance of production cars such as the Toyota 86, Lotus Evora, and Toyota Mark X. The MC concept proved to be popular with independent teams, as well as competitive, with the Toyota 86 MC winning the GT300 championship in 2016.

Since 2006, Group GT1 and Group GT2 could race in GT300, and Group GT3 cars are able to enter GT300 since 2010 season. After the 2011 season, the previous generation Le Mans GTE and GT1 cars were retired from the series with the intention of reducing costs, adopted the Stephane Ratel Organisation GT3 regulations with Lamborghini and Ferrari leading the move with some success, including a class win in the opening round of the 2006 season at Suzuka. Since 2008, BMW also returned to the series by a private team since their exit from JGTC eras.

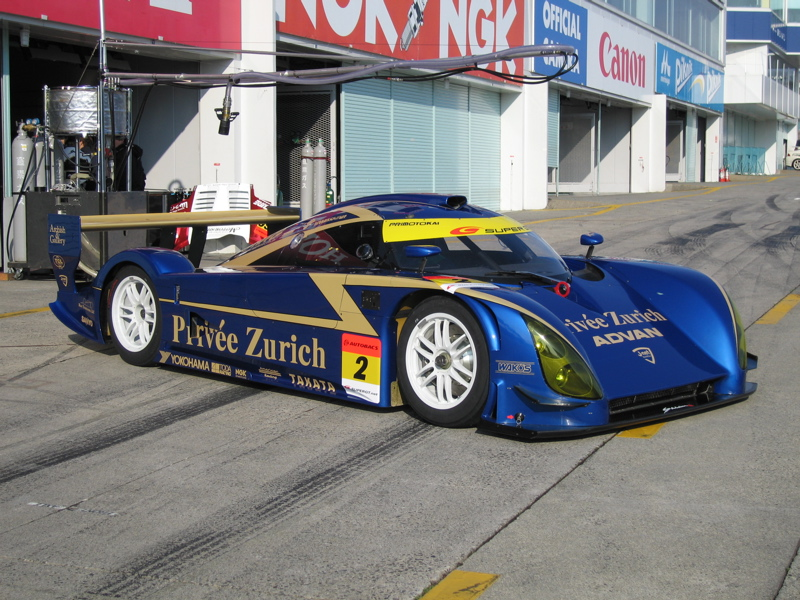
2006 Privée Zurich Shiden (MC/RT-16).

One of the more unique GT300 competitors was the Mooncraft Shiden MC/RT-16, a Riley Daytona Prototype-based revival of the original 1977 Mooncraft Shiden 77 (紫電77). It competed from 2006 to 2012, narrowly losing the title in 2006, and winning the championship in 2007. Front-wheel drive cars such as the Mitsubishi FTO, Toyota Celica and Cavalier, a rarity in top-level circuit racing, are further examples of unique GT300 machines. They competed in their original configurations until the early 2000s, when FWD cars were being permitted to be converted to rear-wheel drive configuration. The FWD cars were mostly unsuccessful, failing to win any championships, although a Celica won a race in 1999 after a Porsche 911 was disqualified. Rear-wheel drive cars dominated the series until 2008, when an all-wheel drive Subaru Impreza developed by Cusco won in Sepang. An open top car, Renault Sport Spider, made a one-off participation in 1997, also with lack of success.

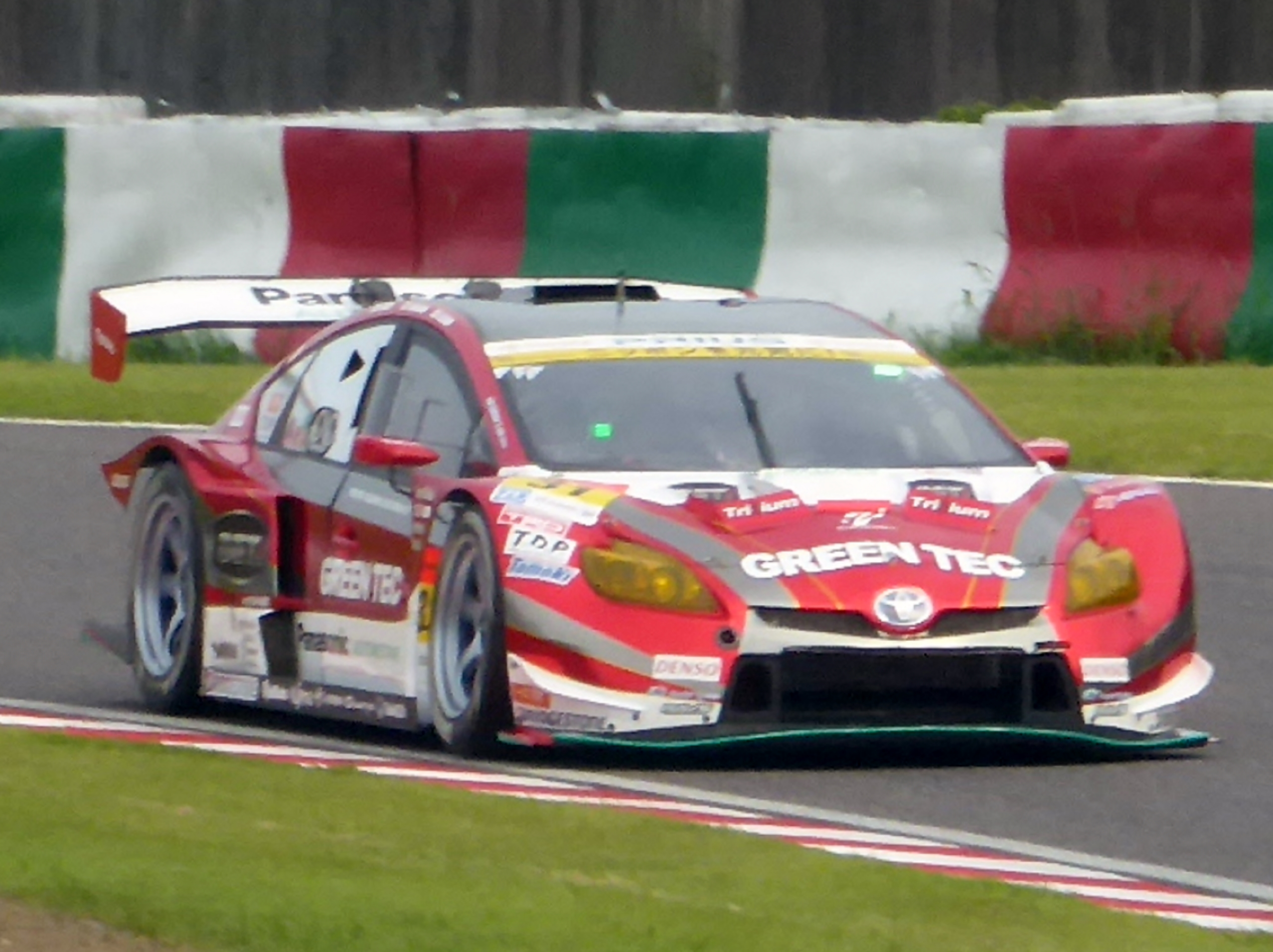
2015 Toyota Prius apr GT.

Hybrid cars first raced in the GT300 class in 2012, when apr introduced their Toyota Prius apr GT, and Team Mugen fielded a Honda CR-Z GT. Both cars were heavily modified from their production counterparts. The Prius was powered by a 3.4 liter V8 LMP1 engine, which worked in concert with production Hybrid Synergy Drive components; the CR-Z utilized a 2.8 liter V6 LMP2 engine and a 50 kW Zytek electric motor. Both the CR-Z and Prius were mid-engined, differing from their front-engined road-going counterparts; this resulted in the CR-Z's withdrawal after the 2015 season, as new regulations for 2016 stipulated that GT300 cars' engines were to be located in the same position as in their production counterparts. However, apr took advantage of a loophole in the regulations to continue to race their mid-engine Prius until 2018, when the team was required to build a new, front-engine Prius.

The development of GT300 cars is much more regulated than that of their GT500 counterparts; the GTA works with the Stephane Ratel Organisation to balance the performance of all GT300 cars via technical adjustments in order to create close racing. While the GT3 cars in the class are closely related to production cars, the JAF-GT machines differ from production vehicles to a greater degree, and in the case of the Mother Chassis cars, share little more than a badge and exterior styling with their road-going counterparts. While engine outputs are at a lower level than the GT500 cars, the GT300 cars still post competitive times and races are relatively tight when combined with GT500 traffic. As it is becoming increasingly more difficult for GT500 cars to overtake GT300s, the GTA may review the speed difference between the two classes in the future, especially if the pace of the GT300 cars continues to increase.

==== Cars ====
Make	Car	Category	Years competed	Image	Note
ASL	ASL ARTA Garaiya	JAF-GT	2005, 2007–2012		
Aston Martin	Aston Martin V8 Vantage	FIA GT2	2010–2012		Served until Round 1, 2012
Aston Martin	Aston Martin V12 Vantage GT3	FIA GT3	2012–2014		
Aston Martin	Aston Martin Vantage AMR GT3	FIA GT3	2019–2020 (first generation) 2024–present (second generation)		
Audi	Audi R8 LMS	FIA GT3	2012–2016 (first generation); 2016–2023 (second generation)		
BMW	BMW Z4 M Coupé	JAF-GT	2008–2009		
BMW	BMW Z4 GT3	FIA GT3	2011–2015		
BMW	BMW M6 GT3	FIA GT3	2016–2018, 2020–2021		
BMW	BMW M4 GT3	FIA GT3	2022–2024 (first generation) 2026–present (second generation)		
Bentley	Bentley Continental GT3	FIA GT3	2017–2018		
Chevrolet	Chevrolet Corvette C6	JAF-GT	2005, 2008		
Chevrolet	Chevrolet Corvette Z06-R	FIA GT3	2011–2013		
Chevrolet	Callaway Corvette C7-R	FIA GT3	2019		Only entered in the 2019 auto sport Web Sprint Cup exhibition race.
Ferrari	Ferrari 360 Modena	JAF-GT	2005–2009		
Ferrari	Ferrari F430 GT2	JAF-GT; FIA GT2	2007–2009; 2009–2012		
Ferrari	Ferrari 458 Italia GT3	FIA GT2; FIA GT3	2011 (GT2); 2012–2013 Rd.3, 2015 (GT3)		
Ferrari	Ferrari 488 GT3	FIA GT3	2017, 2021–2022		
Ferrari	Ferrari 296 GT3	FIA GT3	2024–2026 (first generation) 2026–present (second generation)		
Ford	Ford GT	JAF-GT	2006–2007		Run by DHG Racing, powered by a 3.5L V8 based on a Mugen design
Honda	Honda NSX-GT	JAF-GT	2005		First generation (NA2) NSX
Honda	Honda NSX GT3	FIA GT3	2018–2024		Second generation (NC1) NSX
Honda	Honda CR-Z GT	JAF-GT	2012–2015		Petrol-electric hybrid
Lamborghini	Lamborghini Murciélago RG-1	JAF-GT	2005–2009		Developed by JLOC, initially competed as a detuned GT500 car
Lamborghini	Lamborghini Gallardo	JAF-GT; FIA GT3	2007–2012 (JAF-GT); 2012–2015 (FIA GT3)		JAF-GT specification is the RG-3 variant developed by JLOC. FIA GT3 specification is the GT3 variant developed by Reiter Engineering.
Lamborghini	Lamborghini Huracán GT3	FIA GT3	2016–2019 (first generation); 2019–2024 (second generation); 2023–present (third generation)		Second generation car served until Round 3, 2024
Lexus	Lexus IS350 GT300	JAF-GT	2008–2012		
Lexus	Lexus RC F GT3	FIA GT3	2015–present		
Lexus	Lexus LC500h GT	JAF-GT	2023–present		Developed by apr. Petrol-electric hybrid
Lexus	Lexus LC500 GT	JAF-GT	2025–present		Built by apr. Identical to apr's LC500h GT but without a hybrid system
Lotus	Lotus Exige 300RR	JAF-GT	2005		Spot participant at the Malaysian round, powered by a GM Ecotec engine
Lotus	Lotus Evora MC	JAF-GT	2015–2021		Mother Chassis platform, constructed by Mooncraft.
Mazda	Mazda RX-7	JAF-GT	2005–2010		
McLaren	McLaren MP4-12C GT3	FIA GT3	2013–2015		
McLaren	McLaren 720S GT3	FIA GT3	2019		
Mercedes-Benz	Mercedes-Benz SLS AMG GT3	FIA GT3	2012–2017		
Mercedes-Benz	Mercedes-AMG GT3	FIA GT3	2016–2020 (first generation); 2020–present (second generation)		
Mooncraft	Mooncraft Shiden	JAF-GT	2006–2012		Based on a Riley Technologies Daytona Prototype
Mosler	Mosler MT900	JAF-GT	2005–2007, 2010–2011		As a spot participant in 2009 and 2012
Nissan	Nissan Fairlady Z (Z33)	JAF-GT	2005–2010		
Nissan	Nissan GT-R Nismo GT3	FIA GT3	2012–2019 (first generation); 2018–present (second generation)		
Nissan	Nissan Fairlady Z (RZ34)	JAF-GT	2024-present		Developed by GAINER.
Porsche	Porsche 911 GT3	FIA GT2; FIA GT3; JAF-GT	2005–2011 (GT2/JAF-GT); 2010–2021, 2025–present (GT3)		
Porsche	Porsche Boxster	JAF-GT	2005–2010		
Porsche	Porsche 968 GT4	JAF-GT	2005		
Subaru	Subaru Impreza WRX STi	JAF-GT	2005–2008		Rear-wheel drive 4-door sedan in 2005. Converted to 4WD layout in 2006.
Subaru	Subaru Legacy	JAF-GT	2009–2011		4WD 4-door sedan in 2009. Converted to rear-wheel drive layout in 2010.
Subaru	Subaru BRZ GT300	JAF-GT	2012–2020 (first generation); 2021–present (second generation)		
Toyota	Toyota MR-S	JAF-GT	2005–2008		
Toyota	Toyota Celica	JAF-GT	2005–2008		Served until Round 3, 2008
Toyota	Toyota Corolla Axio apr GT	JAF-GT	2009–2011		4-door sedan, used a Toyota 2GR-FSE engine
Toyota	Toyota Prius apr GT	JAF-GT	2012–2015 (first generation); 2016–2018 (second generation); 2019–2022 (third generation)		First and second generation car is mid-engined, third generation car is front-engined. Petrol-electric hybrid sedan, hybrid system turned off on #30 car in 2019.
Toyota	Toyota 86 MC	JAF-GT	2014–present		Mother Chassis platform, designed and constructed by Dome. Spot entry in 2014.
Toyota	Toyota Mark X MC	JAF-GT	2017–2019		Mother Chassis platform. 4-door sedan designed by Saitama Toyopet.
Toyota	Toyota GR Supra GT300	JAF-GT	2020–present		Developed by apr. Tsuchiya Engineering uses self-built chassis on the same basic design.
Toyota	Toyota GR86 GT300	JAF-GT	2022–present		Developed by apr.
Toyota	Toyota GR GT3	FIA GT3	2026–present		
Vemac	Vemac RD320R	JAF-GT	2005–2011		Developed by Tokyo R&D. Uses a Honda NSX engine. Team Mach's car uses a Porsche 911 GT3 engine.
Vemac	Vemac RD350R	JAF-GT	2005–2012		Developed by Tokyo R&D initially for GT500. Uses a Zytek V8.
Vemac	Vemac RD408R	JAF-GT	2006–2010		Developed by Tokyo R&D initially for GT500. Uses a Mugen LMP engine. Team Mach's car uses a Porsche 911 GT3 engine.

==== GT300 specifications ====
- Engine displacement: Free
- Aspiration: Naturally-aspirated and single or twin-turbocharged
- Number of cylinders: Minimum 4 but not exceeding 10 cylinders
- Allowed engine shape: Flat, Inline and V
- Gearbox: 5 or 6-speed paddle shift gearbox
- Power output: Various
- Fuel: 102 RON unleaded gasoline
- Fuel delivery: Free (direct and indirect multi-point electronic injection)
- Steering: Power-assisted rack and pinion
- Tyre suppliers: Bridgestone, Yokohama, Michelin, and Dunlop

== Circuits ==
- **Bold** denotes a current Super GT track.
- Italic denotes a former Super GT track.

Number	Country / Circuit	Years
1	**(Japan) Fuji Speedway**	2005–present
2	**(Japan) Suzuka Circuit**	2005–present
3	**(Japan) Mobility Resort Motegi**	2005–present
4	**(Japan) Okayama International Circuit**	2005–2019, 2021–present
5	**(Japan) Sportsland Sugo**	2005–2019, 2021–present
6	**(Japan) Autopolis**	2005–2009, 2011–2015, 2017–2019, 2021–present
7	(Malaysia) **Sepang International Circuit**	2005–2013, present
8	(Thailand) Chang International Circuit	2014–2019

== Parity ==
Super GT states that its regulations prioritize race competition over manufacturer investment. GT500 cars use common parts to manage costs and performance parity. In the GT300 class, air restrictor sizes, minimum weights, ride heights, and maximum turbo boost pressures are modified per race to balance performance across all vehicles. Regulatory adjustments and balance of performance data are public.

The regulations stipulate that no single driver drive over two-thirds of the race distance, which affects the timing of pit stops and driver changes, therefore preventing strategy from dominating the competition. Formerly, the regulations went further and required pit stops and driver changes be done within mandatory windows; in 2004, during an exhibition race held at Fontana, a few teams were penalised after the race ended when race officials discovered their pit stops came one lap before the mandatory window had opened.

=== Success Weight ===
Perhaps the best-known performance balancing system in use in the Super GT is its Success Ballast system, also known as Success Weight and formerly referred to as "weight handicap". Weight penalties are assigned depending on a car's performance during the race, similar to systems used in the DTM and the BTCC. The system metes out two kilograms of ballast per point scored; it formerly added ballast based on qualifying positions and individual lap times. Stickers on the cars display every car's weight handicap level. In the 2007 season, the Takata NSX team achieved a record-breaking 5 pole positions in the first 7 races, but due to the weight handicap system, they only won one race among those seven. Such regulations keep the championship in play up to the final race of the season: only two GT500 teams (ARTA in 2007 and MOLA in 2012) and one GT300 team (GAINER with André Couto in 2015) have managed to clinch a driver's championship prior to the final race.

Following repeated cases of teams and drivers not winning a single race but still winning the championship (in 2003, neither the GT500 nor GT300 champions won a single race in particular), the handicap system was changed in 2009 to combat sandbagging, discouraging a team from intentionally performing poorly in order to secure a more favorable weight handicap. The ballast is now halved in the penultimate race and lifted altogether in the final race for teams that participated in every round of the season. Teams missing only one round receive halved-ballast in the final race instead.

In 2017, the weight handicap system for GT500 cars was amended to add fuel flow restrictions. Actual weight ballast will be capped at 50 kilograms for reasons of practicality and safety. When a car's assigned ballast exceeds 50 kilograms, it will be assigned a lesser amount of weight ballast, but a fuel flow restriction will be imposed, the severity of which increases according to the size of the assigned weight handicap. While the amount of actual weight ballast carried may vary, the weight handicap stickers on the cars will continue to display the assigned weight handicap.

Beginning in 2025, GT300 success weight would incorporate refuelling time as part of the formula; similar to GT500, physical would be capped at 50 kilograms, while smaller fuel rig restrictors would be used for cars that exceeded the 50 kg threshold.

== The drivers ==
Like the series, Super GT drivers are very popular in Japan with a growing international fanbase. Top Japanese stars of the 2000s included Toyota factory drivers Juichi Wakisaka and Yuji Tachikawa, Nissan's Satoshi Motoyama, and Honda's Ryo Michigami, who have all won championships in GT500. Some Super GT drivers have leveraged success in GT500 to become FIA World Endurance Champions and winners of the 24 Hours of Le Mans. They include series champions like Benoît Tréluyer, André Lotterer, and Loïc Duval, who all won Le Mans and WEC titles with Audi, as well as Kazuki Nakajima, Kamui Kobayashi, and Ryo Hirakawa, who have achieved the same honours with Toyota Gazoo Racing after winning races in GT500.

The series also attracts drivers who see the series as a stepping-stone to Formula One such as Ralf Schumacher and Pedro de la Rosa, as well as former F1 drivers, most famously Érik Comas, who was the series' most successful driver until he stepped down from his position as a number one driver, and 2016 GT500 Champion Heikki Kovalainen. After a one-off appearance in 2017, 2009 F1 world champion Jenson Button drove for Team Kunimitsu in 2018 and 2019, winning the 2018 title.

In the GT300 class, notable drivers include Nobuteru Taniguchi of Goodsmile Racing, who is also well known as a D1GP champion, and Manabu Orido, a former D1GP judge currently driving for apr Racing. Other well-known drivers in the category were gymkhana legend and three-time series champion Tetsuya Yamano, TV presenter and singer Hiromi Kozono and Masahiko Kondo, who was also a pop star, actor, and racer-turned-team owner.

== Champions ==
Across both classes, 37 different drivers have won the drivers' championship in Super GT since 2005. Japan has produced the most championship-winning drivers across both categories with 27. Ronnie Quintarelli and Sho Tsuboi have won the most drivers' championships in GT500 with four. Including championships won in the JGTC era, Satoshi Motoyama, Juichi Wakisaka, Yuji Tachikawa, Kenta Yamashita, and Naoki Yamamoto each have three titles. In GT300, Tatsuya Kataoka, Nobuteru Taniguchi, and João Paulo de Oliveira have achieved the most drivers' titles since 2005, with three. Including the JGTC era, they are tied with Morio Nitta and Tetsuya Yamano for the most GT300 titles.

Three drivers, Masataka Yanagida, Kazuya Oshima, and Takashi Kogure have won championships in both classes. Toranosuke Takagi in 2005 (GT500), Jenson Button in 2018 (GT500), and Nirei Fukuzumi in 2019 (GT300) have managed to win the championship in their first full season.

Season	Category	Drivers' Championship				Teams' Championship	
Season	Category	Driver(s)	Team	Car	Tyre	Team	Car
2005	GT500	(Japan) Yuji Tachikawa (Japan) Toranosuke Takagi	ZENT Toyota Team Cerumo	Toyota Supra GT500	B	Nismo Xanavi/Motul Pitwork	Nissan Fairlady Z Z33
2005	GT300	(Japan) Tetsuya Yamano (Japan) Kota Sasaki	Team Reckless	Toyota MR-S	M	Team Reckless	Toyota MR-S
2006	GT500	(Japan) Juichi Wakisaka (Germany) André Lotterer	TOYOTA TEAM TOM'S	Lexus SC 430	B	Open Interface Toyota Team TOM'S	Lexus SC 430
2006	GT300	(Japan) Tetsuya Yamano (Japan) Hiroyuki Iiri	RE Amemiya Racing	Mazda RX-7	Y	RE Amemiya Racing Asparadrink	Mazda RX-7 FD3S
2007	GT500	(Japan) Daisuke Ito (Republic of Ireland) Ralph Firman	Autobacs Racing Team Aguri	Honda NSX	B	Autobacs Racing Team Aguri	Honda NSX
2007	GT300	(Japan) Kazuya Oshima (Japan) Hiroaki Ishiura	apr	Toyota MR-S	M	Cars Tokai Dream 28; Privée Kenzo Asset	Mooncraft/Riley Shiden MC/RT-16.
2008	GT500	(Japan) Satoshi Motoyama (France) Benoît Tréluyer	NISMO	Nissan GT-R GT500	B	Petronas Toyota Team TOM'S	Lexus SC 430
2008	GT300	(Japan) Kazuki Hoshino (Japan) Hironobu Yasuda	MOLA	Nissan Fairlady Z Z33	M	MOLA	Nissan Fairlady Z Z33
2009	GT500	(Japan) Juichi Wakisaka (Germany) André Lotterer	Lexus Team Petronas TOM'S	Lexus SC 430 GT500	B	Lexus Team Petronas TOM'S	Lexus SC 430
2009	GT300	(Japan) Tatsuya Kataoka (Japan) Manabu Orido	Racing Project Bandoh	Lexus IS 350	Y	Racing Project Bandoh	Lexus IS 350
2010	GT500	(Japan) Takashi Kogure (France) Loïc Duval	Weider Honda Racing	Honda HSV-010 GT	B	Weider Honda Racing	Honda HSV-010 GT
2010	GT300	(Japan) Kazuki Hoshino (Japan) Masataka Yanagida	Hasemi Motorsport	Nissan Fairlady Z Z33	Y	Hasemi Motorsport	Nissan Fairlady Z Z33
2011	GT500	(Italy) Ronnie Quintarelli (Japan) Masataka Yanagida	MOLA	Nissan GT-R	M	MOLA	Nissan GT-R
2011	GT300	(Japan) Nobuteru Taniguchi (Japan) Taku Bamba	Goodsmile Racing & Studie with TeamUKYO	BMW Z4 GT3	Y	Goodsmile Racing & Studie with TeamUKYO	BMW Z4 GT3
2012	GT500	(Italy) Ronnie Quintarelli (Japan) Masataka Yanagida	MOLA	Nissan GT-R	M	MOLA	Nissan GT-R
2012	GT300	(Japan) Kyosuke Mineo (Japan) Naoki Yokomizo	Team Taisan ENDLESS	Porsche 911 GT3-R	Y	Team Taisan ENDLESS	Porsche 911 GT3-R
2013	GT500	(Japan) Yuji Tachikawa (Japan) Kohei Hirate	Lexus Team ZENT Cerumo	Lexus SC430	B	Lexus Team ZENT Cerumo	Lexus SC430
2013	GT300	(Japan) Hideki Mutoh (Japan) Yuhki Nakayama	Team Mugen	Honda CR-Z	B	Team Mugen	Honda CR-Z
2014	GT500	(Japan) Tsugio Matsuda (Italy) Ronnie Quintarelli	NISMO	Nissan GT-R	M	NISMO	Nissan GT-R
2014	GT300	(Japan) Tatsuya Kataoka (Japan) Nobuteru Taniguchi	Goodsmile Racing & Team Ukyo	BMW Z4 GT3	Y	GAINER	Mercedes-Benz SLS AMG
2015	GT500	(Japan) Tsugio Matsuda (Italy) Ronnie Quintarelli	NISMO	Nissan GT-R	M	NISMO	Nissan GT-R
2015	GT300	(Macau) André Couto	GAINER	Nissan GT-R NISMO GT3	D	GAINER	Nissan GT-R NISMO GT3
2016	GT500	(Finland) Heikki Kovalainen (Japan) Kohei Hirate	Lexus Team SARD	Lexus RC F	B	Lexus Team SARD	Lexus RC F GT500
2016	GT300	(Japan) Takeshi Tsuchiya (Japan) Takamitsu Matsui	VivaC Team Tsuchiya	Toyota 86 MC	Y	VivaC Team Tsuchiya	Toyota 86 MC
2017	GT500	(Japan) Ryo Hirakawa (New Zealand) Nick Cassidy	Lexus Team KeePer TOM'S	Lexus LC 500 GT500	B	Lexus Team KeePer TOM'S	Lexus LC 500
2017	GT300	(Japan) Tatsuya Kataoka (Japan) Nobuteru Taniguchi	Goodsmile Racing & TeamUKYO	Mercedes-AMG GT3	Y	Goodsmile Racing & TeamUKYO	Mercedes-AMG GT3
2018	GT500	(Japan) Naoki Yamamoto (United Kingdom) Jenson Button	Team Kunimitsu	Honda NSX-GT	B	Team Kunimitsu	Honda NSX-GT
2018	GT300	(Japan) Naoya Gamou (Japan) Haruki Kurosawa	K2 R&D LEON Racing	Mercedes-AMG GT3	B	K2 R&D LEON Racing	Mercedes-AMG GT3
2019	GT500	(Japan) Kazuya Oshima (Japan) Kenta Yamashita	Lexus Team Wako's LeMans	Lexus LC 500 GT500	B	Lexus Team KeePer TOM'S	Lexus LC 500 GT500
2019	GT300	(Japan) Shinichi Takagi (Japan) Nirei Fukuzumi	ARTA	Honda NSX GT3 Evo	B	ARTA	Honda NSX GT3 Evo
2020	GT500	(Japan) Tadasuke Makino (Japan) Naoki Yamamoto	Team Kunimitsu	Honda NSX-GT	B	Team Kunimitsu	Honda NSX-GT
2020	GT300	(Japan) Kiyoto Fujinami (Brazil) João Paulo de Oliveira	Kondo Racing	Nissan GT-R Nismo GT3	Y	Kondo Racing	Nissan GT-R NISMO GT3
2021	GT500	(Japan) Yuhi Sekiguchi (Japan) Sho Tsuboi	TGR Team au TOM'S	Toyota GR Supra GT500	B	TGR Team au TOM'S	Toyota GR Supra GT500
2021	GT300	(Japan) Takuto Iguchi (Japan) Hideki Yamauchi	R&D Sport	Subaru BRZ GT300	D	R&D Sport	Subaru BRZ GT300 (ZD8)
2022	GT500	(Japan) Kazuki Hiramine (Belgium) Bertrand Baguette	Team Impul	Nissan Z GT500	B	Team Impul	Nissan Z GT500
2022	GT300	(Japan) Kiyoto Fujinami (Brazil) João Paulo de Oliveira	Kondo Racing	Nissan GT-R Nismo GT3	Y	Kondo Racing	Nissan GT-R Nismo GT3
2023	GT500	(Japan) Sho Tsuboi (Japan) Ritomo Miyata	TGR Team au TOM'S	Toyota GR Supra GT500	B	TGR Team au TOM'S	Toyota GR Supra GT500
2023	GT300	(Japan) Hiroki Yoshida (Japan) Kohta Kawaai	Saitama Toyopet GreenBrave	Toyota GR Supra GT300	B	Saitama Toyopet GreenBrave	Toyota GR Supra GT300
2024	GT500	(Japan) Sho Tsuboi (Japan) Kenta Yamashita	TGR Team au TOM'S	Toyota GR Supra GT500	B	TGR Team au TOM'S	Toyota GR Supra GT500
2024	GT300	(Japan) Takashi Kogure (Japan) Yuya Motojima	JLOC	Lamborghini Huracán GT3 Evo 2	Y	JLOC	Lamborghini Huracán GT3 Evo 2
2025	GT500	(Japan) Sho Tsuboi (Japan) Kenta Yamashita	TGR Team au TOM'S	Toyota GR Supra GT500	B	TGR Team au TOM'S	Toyota GR Supra GT500
2025	GT300	(Japan) Naoya Gamou (Japan) Togo Suganami	K2 R&D LEON Racing	Mercedes-AMG GT3 Evo	B	K2 R&D LEON Racing	Mercedes-AMG GT3 Evo
2026	GT500	(Japan) Naoki Yamamoto (Japan) Tadasuke Makino	Stanley Team Kunimitsu	Honda HRC Prelude-GT	B	Stanley Team Kunimitsu	Honda HRC Prelude-GT
2026	GT300	(Brazil) João Paulo de Oliveira (Japan) Iori Kimura	Kondo Racing	Nissan GT-R Nismo GT3	Y	Kondo Racing	Nissan GT-R Nismo GT3

== International live telecasts ==
- J Sports in Japan
- RTM in Malaysia
- Racer Network in United States and Canada
- Motorsport.tv – International live streaming (except Japan) – paid access to live streams, free access to highlights.
