= Nissan NR engine =

Overview
- Manufacturer: Nissan
- Production: 2013–present (Super GT)

Layout
- Configuration: Inline-4
- Displacement: 2.0 L (1,995 cc)
- Cylinder bore: 84 mm (3.31 in)
- Piston stroke: 90 mm (3.54 in)
- Cylinder block material: Die cast steel or aluminium alloy. Machining process from a solid is not permitted
- Cylinder head material: Die cast steel or aluminium alloy
- Valvetrain: DOHC 16-valve (four-valves per cylinder)
- Compression ratio: 15:1

Combustion
- Turbocharger: Single-turbocharged by Garrett Advancing Motion with 3.5 bar (51 psi) of turbo boost pressure
- Fuel system: Bosch HDEV6 350 bar (5,076 psi) central high-pressure gasoline direct fuel injection. One direct injector per cylinder fed by an engine-driven high-pressure fuel pump
- Management: Bosch Motronic MS 7.4
- Fuel type: Various (102 RON unleaded racing gasoline)
- Oil system: Dry sump
- Cooling system: Single mechanical water pump feeding a single-sided cooling system

Output
- Power output: 550–650 PS (542–641 hp; 405–478 kW)
- Torque output: 500–700 N⋅m (370–520 lbf⋅ft)

Dimensions
- Length: 600 mm (23.62 in)
- Width: 697 mm (27.44 in)
- Height: 693 mm (27.28 in)
- Dry weight: 187 lb (85 kg) including turbocharger

Chronology
- Predecessor: Nissan VRH engine (in Super GT)

The Nissan NR is a family of prototype four-stroke 2.0-litre single-turbocharged inline-4 racing engine, developed and produced by Nissan for the Super GT series under the Nippon Race Engine framework. The engine has been produced in a number of different configurations over the years. The NR engine is fully custom-built.

== Versions ==
All versions of the engine are identical in performance.

- NR20A (2013–2019)
- NR20B (2020)
- NR4S2x (2021–present)

== Applications ==
- Nissan GT-R NISMO GT500
- Nissan Fairlady Z NISMO GT500

== See also ==
- Honda HR-414E/HR-417E/HR-420E engine, similar engines also developed under the Nippon Race Engine framework
- Toyota RI engine, similar engine also developed under the Nippon Race Engine framework
