= Takashi Kogure =

Japanese racing driver (born 1980)

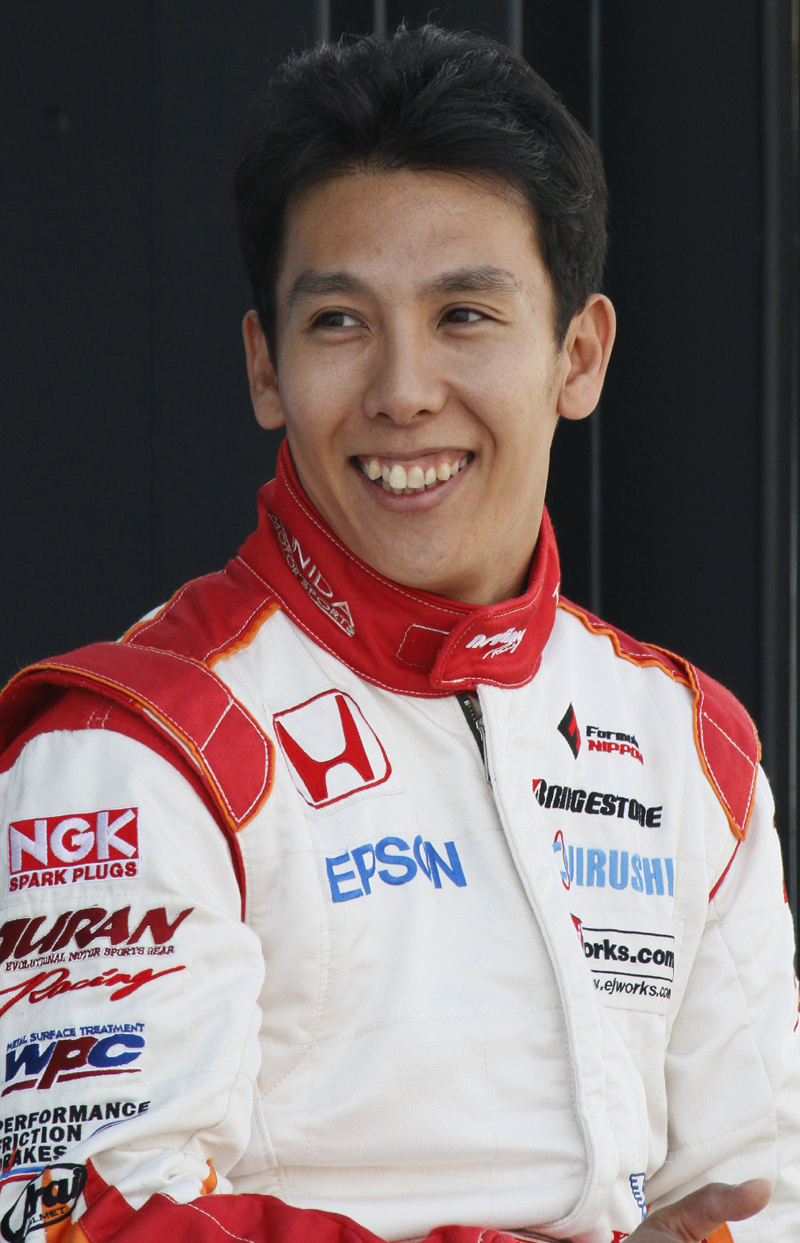
- Kogure in 2010.
- Nationality: (Japan) Japanese
- Born: 1 August 1980 (age 46) Ōta, Gunma, Japan

Super GT career
- Debut season: 2003
- Current team: JLOC
- Categorisation: FIA Platinum (until 2020); FIA Gold (2021–)
- Car number: 88
- Former teams: Nakajima Racing, Dome, ARTA, Team Kunimitsu, Drago Corse, Real Racing
- Starts: 150
- Wins: 14
- Best finish: 1st in 2010, 2024

Super Formula career
- Debut season: 2003
- Former teams: Nakajima Racing, ARTA, Drago Corse, B-Max Racing
- Starts: 126
- Wins: 7
- Poles: 15
- Fastest laps: 9
- Best finish: 3rd in 2007

Previous series
- 2008 2003–17 2001–02: Formula One (testing); Super Formula; All-Japan Formula Three Championship

Championship titles
- 2002: All-Japan Formula Three Championship

Takashi Kogure (小暮卓史, Kogure Takashi; born 1 August 1980) is a Japanese racing driver who currently competes in Super GT, driving the No. 88 Lamborghini Huracán GT3 Evo 2 for JLOC in the GT300 class. He is the reigning champion of Super GT's GT300 class alongside teammate Yuya Motojima. He previously competed in Super GT's flagship GT500 class, winning the championship in 2010 alongside Loïc Duval, making him one of only three drivers in Super GT history to win championship titles in both classes. He also competed in Super Formula (known as Formula Nippon until 2013) for fifteen seasons between 2003 and 2017.

== Career ==
=== Formula Three ===
Kogure made his professional single-seater début in 2001, driving a Dallara F300 in the All-Japan Formula Three Championship for Now Motorsports. He finished in eleventh place in the championship standings. The following season, Kogure moved to Mugen×Dome Project and claimed the championship by ten points from Paolo Montin. Kogure won eleven of the season's twenty races, finishing on the podium on a further four occasions. In the non-championship international races, Kogure finished second at the Korea Super Prix behind Olivier Pla, and third at the Macau Grand Prix behind Tristan Gommendy and Heikki Kovalainen.

=== Super GT ===
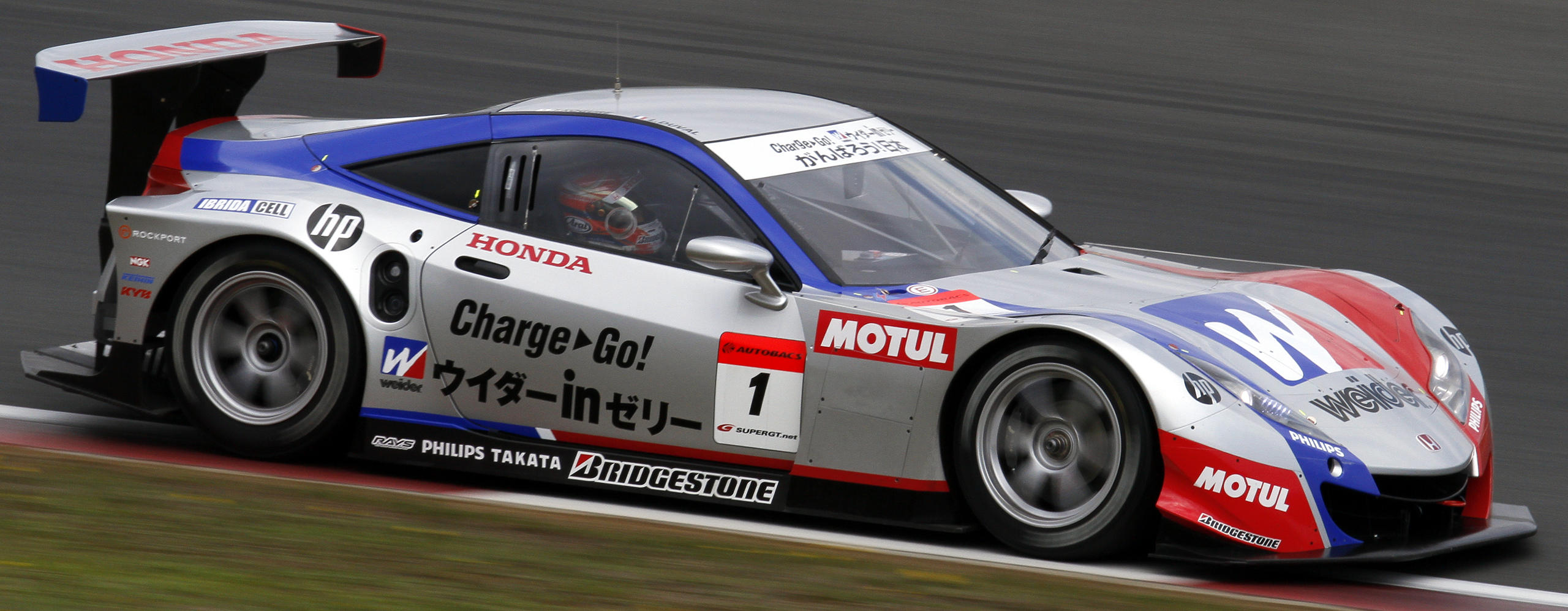
Kogure driving the Honda HSV-010 GT during the 2011 Super GT season.

Kogure made his bow into the All-Japan GT Championship with Nakajima Racing. He contested three races en route to 27th in the championship. After concentrating on Formula Nippon only in 2004, Kogure returned to the newly renamed Super GT championship, with Dome Project in 2005; ending up in nineteenth place in the championship standings. Despite only taking one win in 2006, Kogure and team-mate Ryō Michigami were title contenders, eventually losing out to the crews of André Lotterer and Juichi Wakisaka and also Sébastien Philippe and Shinya Hosokawa. All three pairings were split by four points at the conclusion of the season.

Four pole positions in eight races helped Kogure and Michigami again finish in the top-five in the standings in 2007; finishing fourth ahead of Michael Krumm and Tsugio Matsuda on a tie-break as both pairings finished level on 63 points. Sixth place championship placings followed in 2008 and 2009.

In debut season of Honda HSV-010 GT in 2010 Super GT season, Kogure got title of Drivers' Championship with Loïc Duval, and contributed to get Team's Championship by Weider Honda Racing.

=== Formula Nippon ===
As well as his JGTC campaign, Kogure took part in the Formula Nippon series with Nakajima. He finished tenth in the championship, taking a best result of second at the closing race of the season at Suzuka. He took his first series victory during the 2004 season, finishing out front at the season-opening round, again at Suzuka. He made a further visit to the podium at Sugo en route to seventh in the standings. He improved to fifth place in 2005, despite not winning any races.

Kogure moved to Aguri Suzuki's ARTA team for the 2006 campaign, and again failed to win any races during the season. He only amassed three points towards the championship, but also amassed five pole positions. Despite this, he returned to Nakajima Racing in 2007, taking three victories on the way to his highest championship placing in Formula Nippon; third position behind Team Impul team-mates Matsuda and Benoît Tréluyer. He finished fifth again in 2008, and fourth in 2009 as well as 2010.

=== Formula One ===
As a member of Honda's Formula Dream Project, Kogure had the opportunity to test a Honda RA107 Formula One car at Circuit Ricardo Tormo in January 2008.

== Racing record ==
=== Career summary ===
Season	Series	Team	Races	Wins	Poles	F/Laps	Podiums	Points	Position
1999	FJ1600 Tsukuba Series	ZAP SPEED							?
2000	Formula Toyota	ZAP SPEED							5th
2001	All-Japan Formula Three Championship	NOW Motor Sport	17	0	0	0	0	44	11th
2002	All-Japan Formula Three Championship	Mugen × Dome Project	20	11	10	8	15	290	**1st**
2002	Korea Super Prix	Mugen × Dome Project	1	0	0	0	1	N/A	**2nd**
2002	Macau Grand Prix	Mugen × Dome Project	1	0	0	0	1	N/A	**3rd**
2003	Formula Nippon	PIAA Nakajima Racing	10	0	0	0	1	11	10th
2003	All-Japan Grand Touring Car Championship	Mobil 1 Nakajima Racing	3	0	0	?	0	17	27th
2004	Formula Nippon	Nakajima Racing	9	1	0	1	2	17	7th
2005	Super GT - GT500	Dome Project	8	0	0	0	1	37	19th
2005	Formula Nippon	Nakajima Racing	9	0	1	1	3	15	5th
2006	Super GT - GT500	Dome Project	9	1	1	1	2	76	**3rd**
2006	Formula Nippon	Autobacs Racing Team Aguri	9	0	5	0	0	3	12th
2007	Super GT - GT500	Dome Racing Team	8	1	4	2	2	63	4th
2007	Formula Nippon	Nakajima Racing	9	3	4	2	4	41	**3rd**
2008	Super GT - GT500	Dome Racing Team	9	1	2	1	3	60	6th
2008	Formula Nippon	Nakajima Racing	11	0	0	1	3	41	5th
2008	Formula One	Honda	Test driver						
2009	Super GT - GT500	Team Yoshiki and Dome Project	9	0	0	0	2	50	6th
2009	Formula Nippon	Nakajima Racing	8	2	3	2	3	37	4th
2010	Super GT - GT500	Weider Honda Racing	7	1	3	3	5	67	**1st**
2010	Formula Nippon	Nakajima Racing	8	1	2	1	4	38	4th
2011	Super GT - GT500	Weider Honda Racing	8	2	1	0	2	57	**3rd**
2011	Formula Nippon	Nakajima Racing	7	0	0	0	1	16.5	7th
2012	Super GT - GT500	Weider Honda Racing	8	1	1	0	1	40	6th
2012	Formula Nippon	Nakajima Racing	8	0	0	0	0	4	10th
2013	Super GT - GT500	Team Kunimitsu	8	1	0	0	2	37	10th
2013	Super Formula	Nakajima Racing	7	0	0	2	2	15	8th
2014	Super GT - GT500	Team Kunimitsu	8	0	0	0	0	23	14th
2014	Super Formula	Nakajima Racing	9	0	0	0	0	0	17th
2015	Super GT - GT500	Drago Modulo Honda Racing	8	0	0	0	0	26	12th
2015	Super Formula	Drago Corse	8	0	0	0	0	2.5	15th
2016	Super GT - GT500	Keihin REAL Racing	8	0	0	1	1	27	11th
2016	Super Formula	Drago Corse	9	0	0	0	0	8	13th
2017	Super GT - GT500	REAL Racing	8	0	0	0	2	37	10th
2017	Super Formula	B-MAX Racing Team	7	0	0	0	0	0	18th
2018	Super GT - GT500	REAL Racing	8	1	1	1	2	45	7th
2019	Super GT - GT300	JLOC	8	0	0	0	2	36.5	7th
2020	Super GT - GT300	JLOC	8	0	0	0	1	20	13th
2021	Super GT - GT300	JLOC	8	0	0	0	1	34	8th
2022	Super GT - GT300	JLOC	8	0	0	0	0	25	13th
2022	TGR GR86/BRZ Cup	Recaro Racing Team	3	0	0	0	0	0	NC
2023	Super GT - GT300	JLOC	8	1	0	0	1	40	7th
2023	TGR GR86/BRZ Cup	Recaro Racing Team	7	0	0	0	0	0	NC
2024	Super GT - GT300	JLOC	8	4	2	0	4	96	**1st**
2024	TGR GR86/BRZ Cup	Recaro Racing Team	7	0	0	0	0	0	NC
2025	Super GT - GT300	JLOC	8	0	0	0	1	50.5	13th
2025	TGR GR86/BRZ Cup	Recaro Racing Team	5	0	0	0	0	0	NC
2026	Super GT - GT300	JLOC							

* Season still in progress.

=== Complete Japanese Formula 3 Championship results ===
(key) (Races in bold indicate pole position) (Races in italics indicate fastest lap)

Year	Team	Engine	1	2	3	4	5	6	7	8	9	10	11	12	13	14	15	16	17	18	19	20	DC	Pts
2001	Now Motor Sports	Toyota–TOM'S	SUZ; 1; 6	SUZ; 2 Ret	TSU; 1 Ret	TSU; 2 Ret	FUJ; 1; 9	FUJ; 2 Ret	MIN; 1; 5	MIN; 2; 5	MOT; 1; 7	MOT; 2 Ret	SUZ; Ret	SUG; 1; 6	SUG; 2; 13	SEN; 1; 9	SEN; 2; 5	TAI; 1; 15	TAI; 2 Ret	MOT; 1; 12	MOT; 2; 11		11th	44
2002	Mugen × Dome Project	Mugen–Honda	**TSU**; **1**; 4	**TSU**; **2**; 7	SUZ; 1; 1	**SUZ**; **2**; 1	FUJ; 1 Ret	FUJ; 2 Ret	MIN; 1; 2	**MIN**; **2**; 1	**MOT**; **1**; 1	MOT; 2; 1	**SUZ**; **1**; 1	SUZ; 2; 2	**SUG**; **1**; 1	**SUG**; **2**; 1	**SEN**; **1**; 1	**SEN**; **2**; 1	TAI; 1 Ret	TAI; 2; 2	MOT; 1; 1	MOT; 2; 2	1st	294

=== Complete Formula Nippon/Super Formula results ===
(Races in bold indicate pole position)

Year	Team	Engine	1	2	3	4	5	6	7	8	9	10	11	DC	Points
2003	PIAA Nakajima Racing	Mugen	SUZ; 12	FUJ; 6	MIN; Ret	MOT; DNS	SUZ; 6	SUG; Ret	FUJ; Ret	MIN; 14	MOT; 4	SUZ; 2		10th	11
2004	PIAA Nakajima Racing	Mugen	SUZ; 1	SUG; 9	MOT; 9	SUZ; 7	SUG; 2	MIN; Ret	SEP; 6	MOT; 9	SUZ; 8			7th	17
2005	PIAA Nakajima Racing	Mugen	MOT; Ret	SUZ; 3	**SUG**; 3	FUJ; 8	SUZ; 2	MIN; Ret	FUJ; 11	MOT; 9	SUZ; 6			5th	15
2006	Autobacs Racing Team Aguri	Honda	FUJ; 10	SUZ; 17	**MOT**; Ret	SUZ; 9	**AUT**; 19	**FUJ**; Ret	**SUG**; DSQ	**MOT**; Ret	SUZ; 4			12th	3
2007	PIAA Nakajima Racing	Honda	FUJ; 8	SUZ; 3	MOT; 1	**OKA**; 5	SUZ; 17	FUJ; Ret	**SUG**; 1	**MOT**; 1	**SUZ**; DSQ			3rd	41
2008	PIAA Nakajima Racing	Honda	FUJ; 6	SUZ; 5	MOT; Ret	OKA; 9	SUZ; 3	SUZ; 7	MOT; 5	MOT; Ret	FUJ; 3	FUJ; 6	SUG; 2	5th	41
2009	Nakajima Racing	Honda	FUJ; 8	SUZ; Ret	**MOT**; 1	FUJ; 7	SUZ; 2	**MOT**; 6	**AUT**; 1	SUG; 10				4th	37
2010	Nakajima Racing	Honda	**SUZ**; 1	MOT; 6	FUJ; 5	**MOT**; 2	SUG; 5	AUT; Ret	SUZ; 2	SUZ; 3				4th	38
2011	Nakajima Racing	Honda	SUZ; 2	AUT; Ret	FUJ; 7	MOT; Ret	SUZ; C	SUG; 7	MOT; 5	MOT; 4				7th	16.5
2012	Nakajima Racing	Honda	SUZ; 15	MOT; Ret	AUT; 10	FUJ; 10	MOT; 13	SUG; Ret	SUZ; 6	SUZ; 4				10th	4
2013	Nakajima Racing	Honda	SUZ; 3	AUT; Ret	FUJ; 14	MOT; 5	SUG; 8	SUZ; 15	SUZ; 2					8th	15
2014	Nakajima Racing	Honda	SUZ; Ret	FUJ; Ret	FUJ; DNS	FUJ; Ret	MOT; 11	AUT; Ret	SUG; 10	SUZ; Ret	SUZ; 16			17th	0
2015	Drago Corse	Honda	SUZ; Ret	OKA; Ret	FUJ; 16	MOT; 14	AUT; 13	SUG; 11	SUZ; 6	SUZ; 7				15th	2.5
2016	Drago Corse	Honda	SUZ; 4	OKA; 15	FUJ; 12	MOT; 11	OKA; 11	OKA; 14	SUG; 7	SUZ; 7	SUZ; 9			13th	8
2017	B-Max Racing Team	Honda	SUZ; 15	OKA; 18	OKA; 15	FUJ; 13	MOT; 17	AUT; 12	SUG; 14	SUZ; C	SUZ; C			18th	0

=== Complete Super GT results ===
Year	Team	Car	Class	1	2	3	4	5	6	7	8	9	DC	Pts
2003	Nakajima Racing	Honda NSX	GT500	TAI; 5	FUJ; 6	SUG; 8	FUJ	FUJ	MOT	AUT	SUZ		17th	17
2005	Dome	Honda NSX	GT500	OKA; 7	FUJ; 13	SEP; 7	SUG; Ret	MOT; 2	FUJ; 11	AUT; 5	SUZ; 6		10th	37
2006	Dome	Honda NSX	GT500	SUZ; 4	OKA; 1	FUJ; Ret	SEP; 6	SUG; Ret	SUZ; Ret	MOT; 5	AUT; 2	FUJ; 7	**3rd**	**76**
2007	Dome Racing Team	Honda NSX	GT500	SUZ; 13	OKA; 7	FUJ; 11	SEP; Ret	SUG; 2	SUZ; 12	MOT; 1	AUT; 5	FUJ; 10	4th	63
2008	Dome Racing Team	Honda NSX	GT500	SUZ; 7	OKA; 12	FUJ; 3	SEP; 3	SUG; 1	SUZ; 12	MOT; 8	AUT; 7	FUJ; 14	6th	60
2009	Dome Project	Honda NSX	GT500	OKA; 2	SUZ; 5	FUJ; 13	SEP; 12	SUG; 3	SUZ; 4	FUJ; 8	AUT; 5	MOT; 10	6th	50
2010	Honda Racing	Honda HSV-010 GT	GT500	SUZ; Ret	OKA; 1	FUJ; 7	SEP; 3	SUG; 2	SUZ; 9	FUJ; C	MOT; 2		**1st**	**67**
2011	Honda Racing	Honda HSV-010 GT	GT500	OKA; 7	FUJ; 13	SEP; 1	SUG; Ret	SUZ; 1	FUJ; 4	AUT; 11	MOT; 6		**3rd**	**57**
2012	Honda Racing	Honda HSV-010 GT	GT500	OKA; 7	FUJ; 9	SEP; 1	SUG; 7	SUZ; 8	FUJ; Ret	AUT; 9	MOT; 7		6th	40
2013	Team Kunimitsu	Honda HSV-010 GT	GT500	OKA; 1	FUJ; 7	SEP; 3	SUG; 12	SUZ; 10	FUJ; Ret	AUT; 12	MOT; 12		10th	37
2014	Team Kunimitsu	Honda NSX-GT	GT500	OKA; 9	FUJ; Ret	AUT; 6	SUG; 11	FUJ; 7	SUZ; 6	BUR; 8	MOT; 8		14th	23
2015	Drago Modulo Honda Racing	Honda NSX-GT	GT500	OKA; 6	FUJ; 8	CHA; 10	FUJ; 6	SUZ; 12	SUG; 7	AUT; 7	MOT; 7		12th	26
2016	Keihin REAL Racing	Honda NSX-GT	GT500	OKA; 11	FUJ; 12	SUG; 6	FUJ; 2	SUZ; 10	CHA; 6	MOT; Ret	MOT; 11		11th	27
2017	REAL Racing	Honda NSX-GT	GT500	OKA; 11	FUJ; 8	AUT; 2	SUG; Ret	FUJ; Ret	SUZ; 15	CHA; 3	MOT; 4		10th	37
2018	REAL Racing	Honda NSX-GT	GT500	**OKA**; 1	FUJ; 11	SUZ; 11	CHA; 7	FUJ; 3	SUG; 9	AUT; 6	MOT; 15		7th	45
2019	JLOC	Lamborghini Huracán GT3	GT300	OKA; 10	FSW; 3	SUZ; 19	CHA; 5	FSW; 5					7th	36.5
2019	JLOC	Lamborghini Huracán GT3 EVO	GT300						AUT; 3	SUG; 20	MOT; 11		7th	36.5
2020	JLOC	Lamborghini Huracán GT3 EVO	GT300	FUJ 1; 25	FUJ 2; 15	SUZ 1; 27	MOT 1; 2	FUJ 3; 6	SUZ 2; 13	MOT 2 Ret	FUJ 4 Ret		13th	20
2021	JLOC	Lamborghini Huracán GT3 EVO	GT300	OKA; 9	FUJ; 6	MOT; 24	SUZ; 2	SUG; 7	AUT; 12	MOT; 4	FUJ; 23		8th	34
2022	JLOC	Lamborghini Huracán GT3 EVO	GT300	OKA; 17	FUJ; 5	SUZ; 5	FUJ; 9	SUZ; 17	SUG; 13	AUT; 4	MOT; 5		13th	25
2023	JLOC	Lamborghini Huracán GT3 EVO	GT300	OKA; 24	FSW; 6	SUZ; 21							7th	40
2023	JLOC	Lamborghini Huracán GT3 EVO2	GT300				FSW; 8	SUZ; 4	SUG; 14	AUT; 7	MOT; 1		7th	40
2024	JLOC	Lamborghini Huracán GT3 EVO2	GT300	OKA; 8	**FUJ**; 1	SUZ; 20	FUJ; 5	SUG; 10	AUT; 1	MOT; 1	**SUZ**; 1		**1st**	**96**
2025	JLOC	Lamborghini Huracán GT3 EVO2	GT300	OKA; 9	FUJ; Ret	SEP; 4	FS1 (Ret)	FS2; 11	SUZ; 7	SUG; 15	AUT; 3	MOT; 14	13th	50.5
2026	JLOC	Lamborghini Huracán GT3 EVO2	GT300	OKA; 6	FUJ; 24	FUJ; 17	SUZ; 6	SUG; 8	AUT; DSQ	MOT; 3	**MOT**; 1		4th	70

* Season still in progress.

Sporting positions
Preceded by Benoît Tréluyer	All-Japan Formula Three Champion; 2002	Succeeded by James Courtney
Preceded by Juichi Wakisaka; André Lotterer	Super GT (GT500) Champion; 2010 with: Loïc Duval	Succeeded by Ronnie Quintarelli; Masataka Yanagida
Preceded by Hiroki Yoshida; Kohta Kawaai	Super GT (GT300) Champion; 2024 with: Yuya Motojima	Succeeded by Incumbent
