= 2005 Super GT Series =

Japanese car racing season

The 2005 Autobacs Super GT Series was the thirteenth season of the Japan Automobile Federation Super GT Championship including the All Japan Grand Touring Car Championship (JGTC) era and the first season as the Super GT series. It is also marked as the twenty-third season of a JAF-sanctioned sports car racing championship dating back to the All Japan Sports Prototype Championship. It is a series for Grand Touring cars divided into 2 classes: GT500 and GT300. The season began on March 27 and ended on November 6, 2005, after 8 races. The drivers' champions were Yuji Tachikawa and Toranosuke Takagi in GT500; and Kota Sasaki and Tetsuya Yamano in GT300.

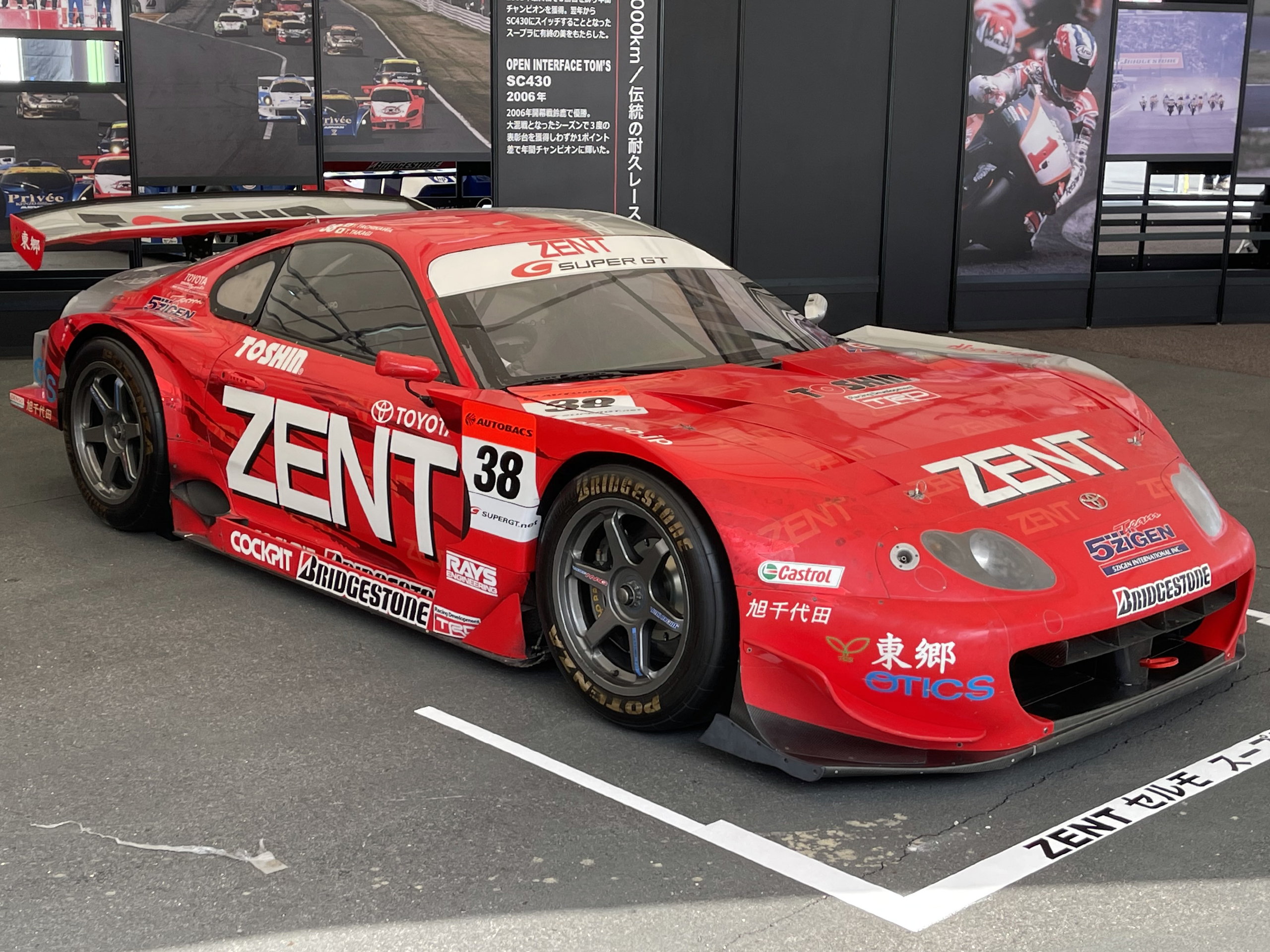
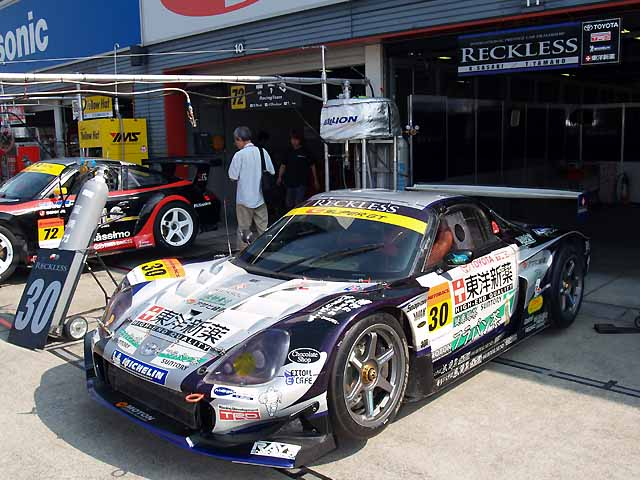
The No. 38 Toyota Supra of Cerumo won the GT500 Drivers' championship (pictured in 2022). The No. 30 Reckless Racing drivers took the GT300 Drivers' and Teams' championship titles.

== Drivers and teams ==
=== GT500 ===
Team	Make	Car	Engine	No.	Drivers	Tyre	Rounds
Nismo	Nissan	Nissan Fairlady Z GT500	Nissan VQ30DETT 3.0 L Twin Turbo V6	1	(United Kingdom) Richard Lyons	B	All
Nismo	Nissan	Nissan Fairlady Z GT500	Nissan VQ30DETT 3.0 L Twin Turbo V6	1	(Japan) Satoshi Motoyama	B	All
Nismo	Nissan	Nissan Fairlady Z GT500	Nissan VQ30DETT 3.0 L Twin Turbo V6	22	(Germany) Michael Krumm	B	All
Nismo	Nissan	Nissan Fairlady Z GT500	Nissan VQ30DETT 3.0 L Twin Turbo V6	22	(Japan) Masataka Yanagida	B	All
G'Zox Hasemi Motorsport	Nissan	Nissan Fairlady Z GT500	Nissan VQ30DETT 3.0 L Twin Turbo V6	3	(France) Érik Comas	B	All
G'Zox Hasemi Motorsport	Nissan	Nissan Fairlady Z GT500	Nissan VQ30DETT 3.0 L Twin Turbo V6	3	(Japan) Toshihiro Kaneishi	B	All
Esso Toyota Team LeMans	Toyota	Toyota Supra GT500	Toyota 3UZ-FE 4.5 L V8	6	(Japan) Akira Iida	B	All
Esso Toyota Team LeMans	Toyota	Toyota Supra GT500	Toyota 3UZ-FE 4.5 L V8	6	(Japan) Juichi Wakisaka	B	All
Autobacs Racing Team Aguri	Honda	Honda NSX GT500	Honda C32B 3.5 L V6	8	(Republic of Ireland) Ralph Firman	B	All
Autobacs Racing Team Aguri	Honda	Honda NSX GT500	Honda C32B 3.5 L V6	8	(Japan) Daisuke Ito	B	All
Calsonic Team Impul	Nissan	Nissan Fairlady Z GT500	Nissan VQ30DETT 3.0 L Twin Turbo V6	12	(Japan) Yuji Ide	B	All
Calsonic Team Impul	Nissan	Nissan Fairlady Z GT500	Nissan VQ30DETT 3.0 L Twin Turbo V6	12	(France) Benoît Tréluyer	B	All
Dome Racing Team	Honda	Honda NSX GT500	Honda C32B 3.5 L V6	18	(Japan) Takashi Kogure	B	All
Dome Racing Team	Honda	Honda NSX GT500	Honda C32B 3.5 L V6	18	(Japan) Ryō Michigami	B	All
Hitotsuyama Racing	McLaren	McLaren F1 GTR	BMW S70/2 6.1 L V12	20	(Japan) Eiichi Tajima	D	2, 6
Hitotsuyama Racing	McLaren	McLaren F1 GTR	BMW S70/2 6.1 L V12	20	(Japan) Yasushi Hitotsuyama	D	2
Hitotsuyama Racing	McLaren	McLaren F1 GTR	BMW S70/2 6.1 L V12	20	(Japan) Mikio Hitotsuyama	D	6
Hitotsuyama Racing	Ferrari	Ferrari 550 GTS	Ferrari F133 5.9 L V12	21	(Japan) Takuya Kurosawa	D	All
Hitotsuyama Racing	Ferrari	Ferrari 550 GTS	Ferrari F133 5.9 L V12	21	(Japan) Hidetoshi Mitsusada	D	All
Toyota Team Tsuchiya	Toyota	Toyota Supra GT500	Toyota 3UZ-FE 4.5 L V8	25	(Japan) Manabu Orido	Y	All
Toyota Team Tsuchiya	Toyota	Toyota Supra GT500	Toyota 3UZ-FE 4.5 L V8	25	(Germany) Dominik Schwager	Y	1–5, 7–8
Toyota Team Tsuchiya	Toyota	Toyota Supra GT500	Toyota 3UZ-FE 4.5 L V8	25	(Japan) Hideki Noda	Y	6
Epson Nakajima Racing	Honda	Honda NSX GT500	Honda C32B 3.5 L V6	32	(Germany) André Lotterer	D	All
Epson Nakajima Racing	Honda	Honda NSX GT500	Honda C32B 3.5 L V6	32	(Japan) Tsugio Matsuda	D	All
Toyota Team Kraft	Toyota	Toyota Supra GT500	Toyota 3UZ-FE 4.5 L V8	34	(Japan) Seiji Ara	D	All
Toyota Team Kraft	Toyota	Toyota Supra GT500	Toyota 3UZ-FE 4.5 L V8	34	(Japan) Naoki Yokomizo	D	All
Toyota Team Kraft	Toyota	Toyota Supra GT500	Toyota 3UZ-FE 4.5 L V8	35	(Japan) Naoki Hattori	D	All
Toyota Team Kraft	Toyota	Toyota Supra GT500	Toyota 3UZ-FE 4.5 L V8	35	(Japan) Shigekazu Wakisaka	D	1–4
Toyota Team Kraft	Toyota	Toyota Supra GT500	Toyota 3UZ-FE 4.5 L V8	35	(United Kingdom) Peter Dumbreck	D	5–8
Toyota Team TOM'S	Toyota	Toyota Supra GT500	Toyota 3UZ-FE 4.5 L V8	36	(Australia) James Courtney	B	All
Toyota Team TOM'S	Toyota	Toyota Supra GT500	Toyota 3UZ-FE 4.5 L V8	36	(Japan) Takeshi Tsuchiya	B	All
Toyota Team TOM'S	Toyota	Toyota Supra GT500	Toyota 3UZ-FE 4.5 L V8	37	(Japan) Tatsuya Kataoka	B	All
Toyota Team TOM'S	Toyota	Toyota Supra GT500	Toyota 3UZ-FE 4.5 L V8	37	(Japan) Sakon Yamamoto	B	All
ZENT Toyota Team Cerumo	Toyota	Toyota Supra GT500	Toyota 3UZ-FE 4.5 L V8	38	(Japan) Toranosuke Takagi	B	All
ZENT Toyota Team Cerumo	Toyota	Toyota Supra GT500	Toyota 3UZ-FE 4.5 L V8	38	(Japan) Yuji Tachikawa	B	All
Denso Toyota Team SARD	Toyota	Toyota Supra GT500	Toyota 3UZ-FE 4.5 L V8	39	(Portugal) André Couto	B	All
Denso Toyota Team SARD	Toyota	Toyota Supra GT500	Toyota 3UZ-FE 4.5 L V8	39	(Italy) Ronnie Quintarelli	B	All
JLOC	Lamborghini	Lamborghini Murciélago R-GT	Lamborghini L535 6.0 L V12	88	(Japan) Koji Yamanishi	Y	1–2, 4–6
JLOC	Lamborghini	Lamborghini Murciélago R-GT	Lamborghini L535 6.0 L V12	88	(Japan) Hisashi Wada	Y	1–2
JLOC	Lamborghini	Lamborghini Murciélago R-GT	Lamborghini L535 6.0 L V12	88	(Italy) Marco Apicella	Y	4–5
JLOC	Lamborghini	Lamborghini Murciélago R-GT	Lamborghini L535 6.0 L V12	88	(Japan) Naohiro Furuya	Y	6
Raybrig Team Kunimitsu	Honda	Honda NSX GT500	Honda C32B 3.5 L V6	100	(France) Jérémie Dufour	B	All
Raybrig Team Kunimitsu	Honda	Honda NSX GT500	Honda C32B 3.5 L V6	100	(France) Sébastien Philippe	B	All

=== GT300 ===
Team	Make	Car	Engine	No.	Drivers	Tyre	Rounds
M-Tec	Honda	Honda NSX	Honda C32B 3.5 L V6	0	(Japan) Shinya Hosokawa	D	All
M-Tec	Honda	Honda NSX	Honda C32B 3.5 L V6	0	(Japan) Haruki Kurosawa	D	All
Verno Tokai Dream28	Vemac	Vemac RD320R	Honda C32B 3.4 L V6	2	(Japan) Kazuho Takahashi	Y	All
Verno Tokai Dream28	Vemac	Vemac RD320R	Honda C32B 3.4 L V6	2	(Japan) Akira Watanabe	Y	All
Team Mach	Vemac	Vemac RD320R	Honda C32B 3.4 L V6	5	(Japan) Tetsuji Tamanaka	Y	All
Team Mach	Vemac	Vemac RD320R	Honda C32B 3.4 L V6	5	(Japan) Katsuhiko Tsutsui	Y	All
RE Amemiya Racing	Mazda	Mazda RX-7	Mazda RE20B 2.0 L 3-rotor	7	(Japan) Hiroyuki Iiri	Y	All
RE Amemiya Racing	Mazda	Mazda RX-7	Mazda RE20B 2.0 L 3-rotor	7	(Japan) Shinichi Yamaji	Y	All
A&S Racing	Mosler	Mosler MT900R	Chevrolet LS1 6.0 L V8	9	(Japan) Junichiro Yamashita	Y	All
A&S Racing	Mosler	Mosler MT900R	Chevrolet LS1 6.0 L V8	9	(Japan) Eiji Yamada	Y	1–4, 6–7
A&S Racing	Mosler	Mosler MT900R	Chevrolet LS1 6.0 L V8	9	(Japan) Shogo Suho	Y	5, 8
A&S Racing	Chevrolet	Chevrolet Corvette	Chevrolet LS1 6.0 L V8	913	(Japan) Hideo Fukuyama	Y	1–6
A&S Racing	Chevrolet	Chevrolet Corvette	Chevrolet LS1 6.0 L V8	913	(Japan) Haruhiko Matsumoto	Y	1
A&S Racing	Chevrolet	Chevrolet Corvette	Chevrolet LS1 6.0 L V8	913	(Japan) Shogo Suho	Y	2–4, 6
A&S Racing	Chevrolet	Chevrolet Corvette	Chevrolet LS1 6.0 L V8	913	(Japan) Eiji Yamada	Y	5
Jim Gainer Racing	Ferrari	Ferrari 360	Ferrari F131B 3.6 L V8	10	(Japan) Yasutaka Hinoi	D	All
Jim Gainer Racing	Ferrari	Ferrari 360	Ferrari F131B 3.6 L V8	10	(Japan) Hideshi Matsuda	D	1–2, 4–5, 7–8
Jim Gainer Racing	Ferrari	Ferrari 360	Ferrari F131B 3.6 L V8	10	(Japan) Taku Bamba	D	3, 6
Jim Gainer Racing	Ferrari	Ferrari 360	Ferrari F131B 3.6 L V8	11	(Italy) Paolo Montin	D	All
Jim Gainer Racing	Ferrari	Ferrari 360	Ferrari F131B 3.6 L V8	11	(Japan) Tetsuya Tanaka	D	All
Endless Sports	Nissan	Nissan Fairlady Z	Nissan VQ35DE 3.5 L V6	13	(Japan) Masami Kageyama	Y	All
Endless Sports	Nissan	Nissan Fairlady Z	Nissan VQ35DE 3.5 L V6	13	(Japan) Mitsuhiro Kinoshita	Y	All
Amprex Motorsports	Lotus	Lotus Exige 300RR	GM Ecotec 3.0 L V6	15	(Malaysia) Tengku Djan Ley	Y	3
Amprex Motorsports	Lotus	Lotus Exige 300RR	GM Ecotec 3.0 L V6	15	(Germany) Norman Simon	Y	3
Racing Project Bandoh	Toyota	Toyota Celica	Toyota 3S-GTE 2.0 L Turbo I4	19	(Japan) Hiroki Katoh	Y	All
Racing Project Bandoh	Toyota	Toyota Celica	Toyota 3S-GTE 2.0 L Turbo I4	19	(Japan) Nobuteru Taniguchi	Y	All
Team Taisan	Porsche	Porsche 996 GT3-R	Porsche M96/77 3.6 L F6	26	(Japan) Yutaka Yamagishi	Y	1–3, 8
Team Taisan	Porsche	Porsche 996 GT3-R	Porsche M96/77 3.6 L F6	26	(Japan) Kaoru Ijiri	Y	1–2
Team Taisan	Porsche	Porsche 996 GT3-R	Porsche M96/77 3.6 L F6	26	(Japan) Takashi Inoue	Y	3
Team Taisan	Porsche	Porsche 996 GT3-R	Porsche M96/77 3.6 L F6	26	(Japan) Isao Ihashi	Y	8
Direxiv Motorsport	Vemac	Vemac RD320R	Honda C32B 3.2 L V6	27	(Japan) Shogo Mitsuyama	Y	All
Direxiv Motorsport	Vemac	Vemac RD320R	Honda C32B 3.2 L V6	27	(Japan) Yasuo Miyagawa	Y	1–6
Direxiv Motorsport	Vemac	Vemac RD320R	Honda C32B 3.2 L V6	27	(Japan) Hiroki Yoshimoto	Y	7–8
Team Reckless	Toyota	Toyota MR-S	Toyota 3S-GTE 2.0 L Turbo I4	30	(Japan) Kota Sasaki	MI	All
Team Reckless	Toyota	Toyota MR-S	Toyota 3S-GTE 2.0 L Turbo I4	30	(Japan) Tetsuya Yamano	MI	All
apr	Toyota	Toyota MR-S	Toyota 3S-GTE 2.0 L Turbo I4	31	(Japan) Kazuki Nakajima	MI	All
apr	Toyota	Toyota MR-S	Toyota 3S-GTE 2.0 L Turbo I4	31	(Japan) Minoru Tanaka	MI	All
Autobacs Racing Team Aguri	ASL	ASL ARTA Garaiya	Nissan VQ35DE 3.5 L V6	43	(Japan) Morio Nitta	MI	All
Autobacs Racing Team Aguri	ASL	ASL ARTA Garaiya	Nissan VQ35DE 3.5 L V6	43	(Japan) Shinichi Takagi	MI	All
MOLA	Nissan	Nissan Fairlady Z	Nissan VQ35DE 3.5 L V6	46	(Japan) Takayuki Aoki	Y	All
MOLA	Nissan	Nissan Fairlady Z	Nissan VQ35DE 3.5 L V6	46	(Japan) Kazuki Hoshino	Y	All
MOLA	Nissan	Nissan Fairlady Z	Nissan VQ35DE 3.5 L V6	47	(Japan) Go Shimizu	Y	All
MOLA	Nissan	Nissan Fairlady Z	Nissan VQ35DE 3.5 L V6	47	(Japan) Tomonobu Fujii	Y	All
Toyota Team Cerumo	Toyota	Toyota Celica	Toyota 3S-GTE 2.0 L Turbo I4	52	(Japan) Katsuyuki Hiranaka	KU	All
Toyota Team Cerumo	Toyota	Toyota Celica	Toyota 3S-GTE 2.0 L Turbo I4	52	(Japan) Hironori Takeuchi	KU	All
R&D Sport	Vemac	Vemac RD350R	Zytek ZV348 3.9 L V8	62	(Japan) Tadao Uematsu	Y	All
R&D Sport	Vemac	Vemac RD350R	Zytek ZV348 3.9 L V8	62	(Japan) Shinsuke Shibahara	Y	1–6, 8
R&D Sport	Vemac	Vemac RD350R	Zytek ZV348 3.9 L V8	62	(Japan) Hiroyuki Yagi	Y	7
Team Gaikokuya	Porsche	Porsche 996 GT3-RS	Porsche M96/77 3.6 L F6	70	(Japan) Yoshimi Ishibashi	Y	1–6
Team Gaikokuya	Porsche	Porsche 996 GT3-RS	Porsche M96/77 3.6 L F6	70	(Japan) Eiichi Tajima	Y	1, 3
Team Gaikokuya	Porsche	Porsche 996 GT3-RS	Porsche M96/77 3.6 L F6	70	(Japan) Hirofumi Takei	Y	2, 4–5
Team Gaikokuya	Porsche	Porsche 996 GT3-RS	Porsche M96/77 3.6 L F6	70	(Japan) Yutaka Yamagishi	Y	6
Team Gaikokuya	Porsche	Porsche 996 GT3-RS	Porsche M96/77 3.6 L F6	170	(Japan) Yoshimi Ishibashi	Y	8
Team Gaikokuya	Porsche	Porsche 996 GT3-RS	Porsche M96/77 3.6 L F6	170	(Japan) Takashi Inoue	Y	8
Teramoto Technical Office	Porsche	Porsche 996 GT3-RSR	Porsche M96/73 3.6 L F6	72	(Japan) Akira Hirakawa	Y	All
Teramoto Technical Office	Porsche	Porsche 996 GT3-RSR	Porsche M96/73 3.6 L F6	72	(Japan) Takashi Inoue	Y	1, 5
Teramoto Technical Office	Porsche	Porsche 996 GT3-RSR	Porsche M96/73 3.6 L F6	72	(Japan) Hiroshi Wada	Y	2–3, 7–8
Teramoto Technical Office	Porsche	Porsche 996 GT3-RSR	Porsche M96/73 3.6 L F6	72	(Japan) Akihiro Asai	Y	4
Cusco Racing	Subaru	Subaru Impreza WRX STI	Subaru EJ20 2.0 L Turbo F4	77	(Japan) Katsuo Kobayashi	Y	All
Cusco Racing	Subaru	Subaru Impreza WRX STI	Subaru EJ20 2.0 L Turbo F4	77	(Japan) Tatsuya Tanigawa	Y	All
JLOC	Lamborghini	Lamborghini Murciélago RG-1	Lamborghini L535 6.0 L V12	86	(Japan) Koji Yamanishi	Y	8
JLOC	Lamborghini	Lamborghini Murciélago RG-1	Lamborghini L535 6.0 L V12	86	(Japan) Naohiro Furuya	Y	8
JLOC	Lamborghini	Lamborghini Murciélago RG-1	Lamborghini L535 6.0 L V12	87	(Japan) Hisashi Wada	Y	4–6, 8
JLOC	Lamborghini	Lamborghini Murciélago RG-1	Lamborghini L535 6.0 L V12	87	(Japan) Naohiro Furuya	Y	4–5
JLOC	Lamborghini	Lamborghini Murciélago RG-1	Lamborghini L535 6.0 L V12	87	(Italy) Marco Apicella	Y	6, 8
Arktech Motorsports	Porsche	Porsche 986 Boxster	Porsche M96/77 3.6 L F6	110	(Japan) Takashi Ohi	Y	All
Arktech Motorsports	Porsche	Porsche 986 Boxster	Porsche M96/77 3.6 L F6	110	(Japan) Ichijo Suga	Y	All
Arktech Motorsports	Porsche	Porsche 996 GT3 Cup	Porsche M96/77 3.6 L F6	112	(Japan) Atsushi Yogo	Y	1–3, 5–8
Arktech Motorsports	Porsche	Porsche 996 GT3 Cup	Porsche M96/77 3.6 L F6	112	(Japan) Keita Sawa	Y	1–3
Arktech Motorsports	Porsche	Porsche 996 GT3 Cup	Porsche M96/77 3.6 L F6	112	(Japan) Takaya Tsubobayashi	Y	5–8
Team LeyJun	Porsche	Porsche 968 GT4	Porsche M44/12 3.0 L Turbo I4	111	(Japan) Hiroya Iijima	Y	All
Team LeyJun	Porsche	Porsche 968 GT4	Porsche M44/12 3.0 L Turbo I4	111	(Japan) Masaki Jyonai	Y	All
910 Racing	Porsche	Porsche 996 GT3 RS	Porsche M96/77 3.6 L F6	777	(Japan) Kazuyoshi Takamizawa	Y	All
910 Racing	Porsche	Porsche 996 GT3 RS	Porsche M96/77 3.6 L F6	777	(Japan) Jukuchou Sunako	Y	All

== Schedule ==
Round	Race	Circuit	Date
1	(Japan) Okayama GT 300 km Race	Okayama International Circuit	March 27
2	(Japan) Fuji GT 500 km Race	Fuji International Speedway	May 4
3	Japan GT Championship Malaysia	Sepang International Circuit	June 26
4	(Japan) SUGO GT 300 km Race	Sportsland Sugo	July 24
5	(Japan) Motegi GT 300 km Race	Twin Ring Motegi	September 4
6	(Japan) Fuji GT 300 km Race	Fuji International Speedway	September 25
7	(Japan) Super GT in Kyushu GT 300 km	Autopolis International Race Course	October 16
8	(Japan) Suzuka GT 300 km	Suzuka Circuit	November 6

== Season results ==
Overall winner in bold

Round	Circuit	GT500 Winning Team	GT300 Winning Team
Round	Circuit	GT500 Winning Drivers	GT300 Winning Drivers
1	Okayama	(Japan) **#25 Eclipse Advan Supra**	(Japan) **#13 Endless Advan Z**
1	Okayama	(Japan) Manabu Orido (Germany) Dominik Schwager	(Japan) Mitsuhiro Kinoshita (Japan) Masami Kageyama
2	Mt. Fuji	(Japan) **#38 Zent Cerumo Supra**	(Japan) **#0 Ebbro M-TEC NSX**
2	Mt. Fuji	(Japan) Yuji Tachikawa (Japan) Toranosuke Takagi	(Japan) Haruki Kurosawa (Japan) Shinya Hosokawa
3	Kuala Lumpur	(Japan) **#1 Xanavi Nismo Z**	(Japan) **#43 ARTA Garaiya**
3	Kuala Lumpur	(Japan) Satoshi Motoyama (United Kingdom) Richard Lyons	(Japan) Morio Nitta (Japan) Shinichi Takagi
4	Sportsland SUGO	(Japan) **#37 Dynacity TOM'S Supra**	(Japan) **#31 Kicchouhouzan MR-S**
4	Sportsland SUGO	(Japan) Tatsuya Kataoka (Japan) Sakon Yamamoto	(Japan) Minoru Tanaka (Japan) Kazuki Nakajima
5	Motegi	(Japan) **#100 Raybrig NSX**	(Japan) **#46 Dream Cube's Advan Z**
5	Motegi	(France) Sebastien Philippe (France) Jérémie Dufour	(Japan) Kazuki Hoshino (Japan) Takayuki Aoki
6	Mt. Fuji	(Japan) **#38 Zent Cerumo Supra**	(Japan) **#0 Ebbro M-TEC NSX**
6	Mt. Fuji	(Japan) Yuji Tachikawa (Japan) Toranosuke Takagi	(Japan) Haruki Kurosawa (Japan) Shinya Hosokawa
7	Autopolis	(Japan) **#8 ARTA NSX**	(Japan) **#30 Reckless MR-S**
7	Autopolis	(Japan) Daisuke Ito (United Kingdom) Ralph Firman	(Japan) Kota Sasaki (Japan) Tetsuya Yamano
8	Suzuka	(Japan) **#38 Zent Cerumo Supra**	(Japan) **#11 Jim Gainer Ferrari Dunlop**
8	Suzuka	(Japan) Yuji Tachikawa (Japan) Toranosuke Takagi	(Japan) Tetsuya Tanaka (Italy) Paolo Montin

== Standings ==
=== GT500 class ===
==== Drivers' standings ====
Scoring system

Position	1st	2nd	3rd	4th	5th	6th	7th	8th	9th	10th
Points	20	15	12	8	6	5	4	3	2	1
Qualifying	2	1	1							
Fastest lap	1	1	1							

- There were no points awarded for pole position and fastest lap in the final race.

Rank	Driver	No.	OKA (Japan)	FUJ (Japan)	SEP (Malaysia)	SUG (Japan)	MOT (Japan)	FUJ (Japan)	AUT (Japan)	SUZ (Japan)	Pts.
1	(Japan) Yuji Tachikawa (Japan) Toranosuke Takagi	38	14	1	11	11	12	1	7	1	67
2	(Republic of Ireland) Ralph Firman (Japan) Daisuke Ito	8	4	12	2	6	16	8	1	12	61
3	(United Kingdom) Richard Lyons (Japan) Satoshi Motoyama	1	Ret	4	1	8	6	10	6	2	60
4	(Australia) James Courtney (Japan) Takeshi Tsuchiya	36	2	10	3	3	7	5	8	5	60
5	(Germany) Michael Krumm (Japan) Masataka Yanagida	22	12	2	6	7	4	9	2	8	57
6	(Japan) Akira Iida (Japan) Juichi Wakisaka	6	11	5	4	4	9	3	10	3	51
7	(Japan) Tatsuya Kataoka (Japan) Sakon Yamamoto	37	6	6	13	1	8	7	Ret	7	43
8	(France) Érik Comas (Japan) Toshihiro Kaneishi	3	3	9	Ret	15	13	4	3	4	42
9	(Germany) André Lotterer (Japan) Tsugio Matsuda	32	5	8	5	13	10	2	14	10	38
10	(Japan) Takashi Kogure (Japan) Ryō Michigami	18	7	13	7	Ret	2	11	5	6	37
11	(France) Benoît Tréluyer (Japan) Yuji Ide	12	Ret	15	8	5	3	13	4	9	35
12	(Japan) Naoki Hattori	35	9	3	14	10	5	6	9	13	29
13	(Japan) Manabu Orido	25	1	14	15	9	15	Ret	Ret	14	26
14	(France) Jérémie Dufour (France) Sébastien Philippe	100	10	11	10	Ret	1	14	Ret	Ret	26
15	(Germany) Dominik Schwager	25	1	14	15	9	15		Ret	14	25
16	(Portugal) André Couto (Italy) Ronnie Quintarelli	39	8	Ret	9	2	14	12	11	11	21
17	(Japan) Shigekazu Wakisaka	35	9	3	14	10					16
18	(United Kingdom) Peter Dumbreck	35					5	6	9	13	13
19	(Japan) Seiji Ara (Japan) Naoki Yokomizo	34	Ret	7	12	14	11	16	12	16	4
20	(Japan) Hideki Noda	25						Ret			1
-	(Japan) Takuya Kurosawa (Japan) Hidetoshi Mitsusada	21	Ret	Ret	Ret	12	Ret	15	13	15	0
-	(Japan) Koji Yamanishi	88	13	DNS		Ret	17	Ret			0
-	(Japan) Hisashi Wada	88	13	DNS							0
-	(Japan) Eiichi Tajima	20		Ret				17			0
-	(Italy) Marco Apicella	88				Ret	17				0
-	(Japan) Mikio Hitotsuyama	20						17			0
-	(Japan) Yasushi Hitotsuyama	20		Ret							0
-	(Japan) Naohiro Furuya	88						Ret			0
Rank	Driver		OKA (Japan)	FUJ (Japan)	SEP (Malaysia)	SUG (Japan)	MOT (Japan)	FUJ (Japan)	AUT (Japan)	SUZ (Japan)	Pts.

Colour	Result
Gold	Winner
Silver	Second place
Bronze	Third place
Green	Points classification
Blue	Non-points classification
Blue	Non-classified finish (NC)
Purple	Retired, not classified (Ret)
Red	Did not qualify (DNQ)
Red	Did not pre-qualify (DNPQ)
Black	Disqualified (DSQ)
White	Did not start (DNS)
White	Withdrew (WD)
White	Race cancelled (C)
Blank	Did not practice (DNP)
Blank	Did not arrive (DNA)
Blank	Excluded (EX)

==== Teams' standings ====
For teams that entered multiple cars, only the best result from each round counted towards the teams' championship.

Rank	Team	No.	OKA (Japan)	FUJ (Japan)	SEP (Malaysia)	SUG (Japan)	MOT (Japan)	FUJ (Japan)	AUT (Japan)	SUZ (Japan)	Pts.
1	Nismo	1	Ret	4	1	8	6	10	6	2	86
1	Nismo	22	12	2	6	7	4	9	2	8	86
2	Team Honda Racing	8	4	12	2	6	16	8	1	12	82
2	Team Honda Racing	18	7	13	7	Ret	2	11	5	6	82
3	Toyota Team TOM'S	36	2	10	3	3	7	5	8	5	73
3	Toyota Team TOM'S	37	6	6	13	1	8	7	Ret	7	73
4	Toyota Team Cerumo	38	14	1	11	11	12	1	7	1	67
5	Esso Toyota Team LeMans	6	11	5	4	4	9	3	10	3	51
6	Hasemi Motorsport	3	3	9	Ret	15	13	4	3	4	42
7	Nakajima Racing	32	5	8	5	13	10	2	14	10	38
8	Team Impul	12	Ret	15	8	5	3	13	4	9	35
9	Kraft	34	Ret	7	12	14	11	16	12	16	29
9	Kraft	35	9	3	14	10	5	6	9	13	29
10	Team Advan Tsuchiya	25	1	14	15	9	15	Ret	Ret	14	26
10	Team Kunimitsu	100	10	11	10	Ret	1	14	Ret	Ret	26
12	Toyota Team SARD	39	8	Ret	9	2	14	12	11	11	21
-	Hitotsuyama Racing	20		DNS				17			0
-	Hitotsuyama Racing	21	Ret	Ret	Ret	12	Ret	15	13	15	0
-	JLOC	88	13	DNS		Ret	17	Ret			0
Rank	Team	No.	OKA (Japan)	FUJ (Japan)	SEP (Malaysia)	SUG (Japan)	MOT (Japan)	FUJ (Japan)	AUT (Japan)	SUZ (Japan)	Pts.

=== GT300 Drivers' championship ===
Rank	Driver	No.	OKA (Japan)	FUJ (Japan)	SEP (Malaysia)	SUG (Japan)	MOT (Japan)	FUJ (Japan)	AUT (Japan)	SUZ (Japan)	Pts.
1	(Japan) Kota Sasaki (Japan) Tetsuya Yamano	30	5	3	2	3	8	3	1	3	93
2	(Japan) Haruki Kurosawa (Japan) Shinya Hosokawa	0	3	1	9	2 (Note: M-Tec was stripped of the championship points they received in the round as a penalty for team principal Shinichi Kamakura punching an official following an incident at the red flag period where a race official hit the M-Tec NSX, damaging its rear wing in the process.)	12	1	7	2	81
3	(Japan) Morio Nitta (Japan) Shinichi Takagi	43	10	2	1	18	3	Ret	2	8	74
4	(Japan) Tetsuya Tanaka (Italy) Paolo Montin	11	6	4	4	Ret	9	2	5	1	66
5	(Japan) Takayuki Aoki (Japan) Kazuki Hoshino	46	8	7	6	Ret	1	4	6	4	59
6	(Japan) Masami Kageyama (Japan) Mitsuhiro Kinoshita	13	1	9	3	5	4	5	Ret	10	58
7	(Japan) Hiroki Katoh (Japan) Nobuteru Taniguchi	19	7	6	7	7	2	6	3	9	54
8	(Japan) Kazuki Nakajima (Japan) Minoru Tanaka	31	4	5	5	1	Ret	7	Ret	7	52
9	(Japan) Hiroyuki Iiri (Japan) Shinichi Yamaji	7	2	Ret	8	4	7	17	4	12	41
10	(Japan) Yasutaka Hinoi	10	13	17	Ret	10	5	Ret	19	5	14
11	(Japan) Hideshi Matsuda	10	13	17	Ret	10	5		19	5	13
12	(Japan) Shogo Mitsuyama	27	9	11	Ret	6	18	10	10	14	13
13	(Japan) Yasuo Miyagawa	27	9	11	Ret	6	18	10			12
14	(Japan) Kazuho Takahashi (Japan) Akira Watanabe	2	14	13	14	9	6	Ret	14	7	12
15	(Japan) Katsuyuki Hiranaka (Japan) Hironori Takeuchi	52	11	14	12	8	14	Ret	8	18	7
16	(Japan) Tadao Uematsu	62	Ret	8	11	Ret	10	DSQ	16	22	6
17	(Japan) Shinsuke Shibahara	62	Ret	8	11	Ret	10	DSQ		22	5
18	(Japan) Hisashi Wada	87				Ret	11	8		Ret	3
18	(Italy) Marco Apicella	87						8		Ret	3
18	(Japan) Katsuo Kobayashi (Japan) Tatsuya Tanigawa	77	12	21	10	11	13	9	Ret	13	3
18	(Japan) Go Shimizu (Japan) Tomonobu Fujii	47	15	10	17	17	15	Ret	9	15	3
22	(Japan) Taku Bamba	10						Ret			1
22	(Japan) Hiroki Yoshimoto	27							10	14	1
22	(Japan) Hiroyuki Yagi	62							16		1
-	(Japan) Naohiro Furuya	87/86				Ret	11			11	0
-	(Japan) Junichiro Yamashita	9	16	15	Ret	14	20	11	13	23	0
-	(Japan) Eiji Yamada	9/913	16	15	Ret	14	22	11	13		0
-	(Japan) Tetsuji Tamanaka (Japan) Katsuhiko Tsutsui	5	19	Ret	13	12	16	12	11	17	0
-	(Japan) Koji Yamanishi	86								11	0
-	(Japan) Yutaka Yamagishi	26/70	Ret	12	16			13		19	0
-	(Japan) Kaoru Ijiri	26	Ret	12							0
-	(Japan) Atsushi Yogo	112	Ret	16	Ret		Ret	DNS	12	16	0
-	(Japan) Takaya Tsubobayashi	112					Ret	DNS	12	16	0
-	(Japan) Akira Hirakawa	72	17	19	18	13	19	16	18	25	0
-	(Japan) Akihiro Asai	72				13					0
-	(Japan) Hiroya Iijima (Japan) Masaki Jyonai	111	Ret	Ret	21	16	Ret	14	Ret	Ret	0
-	(Japan) Kazuyoshi Takamizawa (Japan) Jukuchou Sunako	777	Ret	18	15	15	17	Ret	15	20	0
-	(Japan) Takashi Ohi (Japan) Ichijo Suga	110	DNS	DNS	19	20	Ret	15	17	24	0
-	(Japan) Keita Sawa	112	Ret	16	Ret						0
-	(Japan) Takashi Inoue	72/26/170	17		16		19			21	0
-	(Japan) Yoshimi Ishibashi	70/170	18	20	20	19	21	13		21	0
-	(Japan) Eiichi Tajima	70	18		20						0
-	(Japan) Hiroshi Wada	72		19	18			16	18	25	0
-	(Japan) Hirofumi Takei	70		20		19	21				0
-	(Japan) Isao Ihashi	26								19	0
-	(Japan) Shogo Suho	913/9		Ret	DNS	DNS	20	Ret		23	0
-	(Japan) Hideo Fukuyama	913	Ret	Ret	DNS	DNS	22	Ret			0
-	(Japan) Haruhiko Matsumoto	913	Ret								0
-	(Malaysia) Tengku Djan Ley (Germany) Norman Simon	15			DNS						0
Rank	Driver	No.	OKA (Japan)	FUJ (Japan)	SEP (Malaysia)	SUG (Japan)	MOT (Japan)	FUJ (Japan)	AUT (Japan)	SUZ (Japan)	Pts.

==== GT300 Teams' standings ====
For teams that entered multiple cars, only the best result from each round counted towards the teams' championship.

Rank	Team	No.	OKA (Japan)	FUJ (Japan)	SEP (Malaysia)	SUG (Japan)	MOT (Japan)	FUJ (Japan)	AUT (Japan)	SUZ (Japan)	Pts.
1	Team Reckless	30	5	3	2	3	8	3	1	3	93
2	M-TEC Co. LTD.	0	3	1	9	2	12	1	7	2	81
3	Autobacs Racing Team Aguri	43	10	2	1	18	3	Ret	2	8	74
4	Jim Gainer Racing	10	13	17	Ret	10	5	Ret	19	5	72
4	Jim Gainer Racing	11	6	4	4	Ret	9	2	5	1	72
5	MOLA	46	8	7	6	Ret	1	4	6	4	59
5	MOLA	47	15	10	17	17	15	Ret	9	15	59
6	Endless Sports	13	1	9	3	5	4	5	Ret	10	58
7	Racing Project Bandoh	19	7	6	7	7	2	6	3	9	54
8	apr	31	4	5	5	1	Ret	7	Ret	7	52
9	RE Amemiya Racing	7	2	Ret	8	4	7	17	4	12	41
10	Direxiv Motorsport	27	9	11	Ret	6	18	10	10	14	13
11	Verno Tokai Dream28	2	14	13	14	9	6	Ret	14	7	12
12	Toyota Team Cerumo	52	11	14	12	8	14	Ret	8	18	7
13	R&D Sport	62	Ret	8	11	Ret	10	DSQ	16	22	6
14	JLOC	86								11	3
14	JLOC	87				Ret	11	8		Ret	3
14	Cusco Racing	77	12	21	10	11	13	9	Ret	13	3
-	A&S Racing	9	16	15	Ret	14	20	11	13	23	0
-	A&S Racing	913	Ret	Ret	DNS	DNS	22	Ret			0
-	Team Mach	5	19	Ret	13	12	16	12	11	17	0
-	Team Taisan	26	Ret	12	16					19	0
-	Arktech Motorsports	110	DNS	DNS	19	20	Ret	15	17	24	0
-	Arktech Motorsports	112	Ret	16	Ret		Ret	DNS	12	16	0
-	Teramoto Technical Office	72	17	19	18	13	19	16	18	25	0
-	Team LeyJun	111	Ret	Ret	21	16	Ret	14	Ret	Ret	0
-	910 Racing	777	Ret	18	15	15	17	Ret	15	20	0
-	Team Gaikokuya	70	18	20	20	19	21	13			0
-	Team Gaikokuya	170								21	0
-	Amprex Motorsports	15			DNS						0
Rank	Team	No.	OKA (Japan)	FUJ (Japan)	SEP (Malaysia)	SUG (Japan)	MOT (Japan)	FUJ (Japan)	AUT (Japan)	SUZ (Japan)	Pts.
