= 2006 Formula Nippon Championship =

The 2006 Formula Nippon Championship was the thirty-fourth season of premier Japanese single-seater racing, and the eleventh under the Formula Nippon moniker. It was contested over nine rounds at five venues, with Autopolis returning to the calendar for the first time since 1992, replacing Miné Circuit. 12 teams and 25 drivers competed in the championship.

For the first time since 1997, multiple companies supplied engines to Formula Nippon teams, with Toyota and Honda each introducing new three-litre, naturally-aspirated V8 engines derived from their previous offerings in the IndyCar Series.

All teams used the Lola FN06 - Toyota or Honda - Bridgestone chassis/engine/tires combination.

Team Impul driver Benoît Tréluyer won his first series championship.

== Teams and drivers ==
All teams used tyres supplied by Bridgestone and Lola B06/51 chassis.

| Team | # | Driver | Engine | Rounds |
|---|---|---|---|---|
| arting Racing Team with Impul | 1 | (Japan) Satoshi Motoyama | Toyota RV8J | All |
| arting Racing Team with Impul | 2 | (Japan) Kazuki Hoshino | Toyota RV8J | All |
| Kondo Racing | 3 | (Japan) Sakon Yamamoto | Toyota RV8J | 1–3 |
| Kondo Racing | 3 | (Japan) Seiji Ara | Toyota RV8J | 4–9 |
| Kondo Racing | 4 | (Japan) Masataka Yanagida | Toyota RV8J | All |
| Team Reckless 5ZIGEN; Team 5ZIGEN; M&O with Team 5ZIGEN | 5 | (Japan) Ryō Michigami | Honda HF386E | All |
| Team Reckless 5ZIGEN; Team 5ZIGEN; M&O with Team 5ZIGEN | 6 | (Japan) Ryo Orime | Honda HF386E | 1–8 |
| Team Reckless 5ZIGEN; Team 5ZIGEN; M&O with Team 5ZIGEN | 6 | (Brazil) João Paulo de Oliveira | Honda HF386E | 9 |
| Team LeMans | 7 | (Japan) Tatsuya Kataoka | Toyota RV8J | All |
| Team LeMans | 8 | (Japan) Toranosuke Takagi | Toyota RV8J | All |
| Team Cerumo; Team Reckless Cerumo | 11 | (Japan) Yuji Tachikawa | Toyota RV8J | All |
| EMS Racing | 17 | (Japan) Katsuyuki Hiranaka | Honda HF386E | 5–9 |
| mobilecast Team Impul | 19 | (France) Benoît Tréluyer | Toyota RV8J | All |
| mobilecast Team Impul | 20 | (Japan) Tsugio Matsuda | Toyota RV8J | All |
| DPR Direxiv | 27 | (Japan) Shogo Mitsuyama | Honda HF386E | 1–4 |
| PIAA Nakajima Racing | 31 | (France) Loïc Duval | Honda HF386E | All |
| PIAA Nakajima Racing | 32 | (Japan) Hideki Mutoh | Honda HF386E | All |
| Team BOSS INGING Formula Nippon | 33 | (Italy) Ronnie Quintarelli | Toyota RV8J | All |
| Team BOSS INGING Formula Nippon | 34 | (Japan) Naoki Yokomizo | Toyota RV8J | All |
| DHG TOM'S Racing | 36 | (Germany) André Lotterer | Toyota RV8J | All |
| DHG TOM'S Racing | 37 | (Japan) Takeshi Tsuchiya | Toyota RV8J | All |
| DoCoMo Team Dandelion Racing | 40 | (Sweden) Björn Wirdheim | Honda HF386E | All |
| DoCoMo Team Dandelion Racing | 41 | (Japan) Katsuyuki Hiranaka | Honda HF386E | 1–3 |
| DoCoMo Team Dandelion Racing | 41 | (Japan) Yuji Ide | Honda HF386E | 4–9 |
| Autobacs Racing Team Aguri | 55 | (Japan) Toshihiro Kaneishi | Honda HF386E | All |
| Autobacs Racing Team Aguri | 56 | (Japan) Takashi Kogure | Honda HF386E | All |

== Race calendar and results ==
2006 venues

| Round | Circuit | Date | Pole position | Fastest lap | Winning driver | Winning team |
|---|---|---|---|---|---|---|
| 1 | Fuji Speedway | 2 April | (France) Benoît Tréluyer | (Japan) Masataka Yanagida | (France) Benoît Tréluyer | mobilecast IMPUL |
| 2 | Suzuka Circuit | 16 April | (France) Benoît Tréluyer | (France) Benoît Tréluyer | (France) Loïc Duval | PIAA Nakajima |
| 3 | Twin Ring Motegi | 28 May | (Japan) Takashi Kogure | (Japan) Tsugio Matsuda | (Germany) André Lotterer | DHG TOM'S |
| 4 | Suzuka Circuit | 9 July | (France) Benoît Tréluyer | (France) Benoît Tréluyer | (France) Benoît Tréluyer | mobilecast IMPUL |
| 5 | Autopolis | 6 August | (Japan) Takashi Kogure | (France) Loïc Duval | (Japan) Tsugio Matsuda | mobilecast IMPUL |
| 6 | Fuji Speedway | 27 August | (Japan) Takashi Kogure | (Japan) Satoshi Motoyama | (France) Benoît Tréluyer | mobilecast IMPUL |
| 7 | Sportsland SUGO | 17 September | (Japan) Takashi Kogure | (Japan) Hideki Mutoh | (France) Loïc Duval | PIAA Nakajima |
| 8 | Twin Ring Motegi | 22 October | (Japan) Takashi Kogure | (Japan) Satoshi Motoyama | (France) Benoît Tréluyer | mobilecast IMPUL |
| 9 | Suzuka Circuit | 19 November | (Japan) Tsugio Matsuda | (France) Benoît Tréluyer | (Germany) André Lotterer | DHG TOM'S |

== Championship standings ==
=== Drivers' Championship ===
Scoring system

| Position | 1st | 2nd | 3rd | 4th | 5th | 6th |
| Points | 10 | 6 | 4 | 3 | 2 | 1 |

| Rank | Name | FUJ | SUZ | MOT | SUZ | ATP | FUJ | SGO | MOT | SUZ | Points |
|---|---|---|---|---|---|---|---|---|---|---|---|
| 1 | (France) Benoît Tréluyer | 1 | 3 | 2 | 1 | 7 | 1 | 2 | 1 | Ret | 51 |
| 2 | (Japan) Tsugio Matsuda | 2 | 9 | 5 | 2 | 1 | 7 | 3 | 2 | 2 | 37 |
| 3 | (Germany) André Lotterer | 8 | 5 | 1 | 5 | 8 | 2 | Ret | Ret | 1 | 30 |
| 4 | (France) Loïc Duval | 11 | 1 | 6 | Ret | 18 | 9 | 1 | 4 | 6 | 25 |
| 5 | (Japan) Satoshi Motoyama | 3 | 8 | 3 | 3 | Ret | 3 | 5 | Ret | Ret | 16 |
| 6 | (Sweden) Björn Wirdheim | 4 | 2 | 4 | Ret | 6 | 6 | 6 | 11 | 9 | 13.5 |
| 7 | (Japan) Tatsuya Kataoka | 13 | 7 | Ret | 6 | 3 | Ret | 9 | 3 | 3 | 13 |
| 8 | (Japan) Yuji Tachikawa | 12 | Ret | 10 | 4 | 4 | 5 | 7 | 5 | Ret | 10 |
| 9 | (Japan) Toshihiro Kaneishi | 16 | Ret | Ret | Ret | 2 | 4 | Ret | Ret | 7 | 9 |
| 10 | (Italy) Ronnie Quintarelli | 5 | Ret | Ret | Ret | 5 | 10 | 4 | 9 | 12 | 6 |
| 11 | (Japan) Sakon Yamamoto | 6 | 4 | 14 | | | | | | | 3.5 |
| 12 | (Japan) Takashi Kogure | 10 | 17 | Ret | 9 | 19 | Ret | DSQ | Ret | 4 | 3 |
| 13 | (Japan) Takeshi Tsuchiya | 9 | 10 | Ret | 7 | 9 | Ret | 8 | 8 | 5 | 2 |
| 14 | (Japan) Hideki Mutoh | 19 | 6 | 8 | Ret | 17 | 16 | 10 | 10 | Ret | 1 |
| 15 | (Japan) Masataka Yanagida | 7 | Ret | 9 | 13 | 13 | 12 | Ret | 6 | 13 | 1 |
| 16 | (Japan) Ryō Michigami | 20 | 18 | 7 | Ret | 11 | 15 | 12 | Ret | 11 | 0 |
| 17 | (Japan) Naoki Yokomizo | 14 | 13 | Ret | 11 | Ret | Ret | 11 | 7 | Ret | 0 |
| 18 | (Japan) Toranosuke Takagi | 22 | 16 | 11 | 8 | 16 | 8 | Ret | Ret | Ret | 0 |
| 19 | (Brazil) João Paulo de Oliveira | | | | | | | | | 8 | 0 |
| 20 | (Japan) Seiji Ara | | | | 10 | 10 | 18 | 13 | Ret | Ret | 0 |
| 21 | (Japan) Yuji Ide | | | | 12 | 12 | 11 | Ret | Ret | 10 | 0 |
| 22 | (Japan) Katsuyuki Hiranaka | 17 | 11 | Ret | | 15 | 14 | Ret | Ret | Ret | 0 |
| 23 | (Japan) Ryo Orime | 21 | 15 | 12 | Ret | Ret | 17 | DSQ | 12 | | 0 |
| 24 | (Japan) Shogo Mitsuyama | 15 | 12 | 13 | Ret | | | | | | 0 |
| 25 | (Japan) Kazuki Hoshino | 18 | 14 | Ret | Ret | 14 | 13 | Ret | Ret | 14 | 0 |

Note:

^{‡} Because of heavy rain at Fuji during the race, the event ended after two laps. Half points were awarded because of the stoppage before the 75% point.

=== Teams' Championship ===
| Rank | Team | Car | FUJ | SUZ | MOT | SUZ | ATP | FUJ | SGO | MOT | SUZ | Points |
|---|---|---|---|---|---|---|---|---|---|---|---|---|
| 1 | mobilecast Impul | 19 | 1 | 3 | 2 | 1 | 7 | 1 | 2 | 1 | Ret | 88 |
| 1 | mobilecast Impul | 20 | 2 | 9 | 5 | 2 | 1 | 7 | 3 | 2 | 2 | 88 |
| 2 | DHG TOM'S | 36 | 8 | 5 | 1 | 5 | 8 | 2 | Ret | Ret | 1 | 32 |
| 2 | DHG TOM'S | 37 | 9 | 10 | Ret | 7 | 9 | Ret | 8 | 8 | 5 | 32 |
| 3 | PIAA Nakajima | 31 | 11 | 1 | 6 | Ret | 18 | 9 | 1 | 4 | 6 | 26 |
| 3 | PIAA Nakajima | 32 | 19 | 6 | 8 | Ret | 17 | 16 | 10 | 10 | Ret | 26 |
| 4 | arting Impul | 1 | 3 | 8 | 3 | 3 | Ret | 3 | 5 | Ret | Ret | 16 |
| 4 | arting Impul | 2 | 18 | 14 | Ret | Ret | 14 | 13 | Ret | Ret | 14 | 16 |
| 5 | DoCoMo Dandelion | 40 | 4 | 2 | 4 | Ret | 6 | 6 | 6 | 11 | 9 | 13.5 |
| 5 | DoCoMo Dandelion | 41 | 17 | 11 | Ret | 12 | 12 | 11 | Ret | Ret | 10 | 13.5 |
| 6 | Team LeMans | 7 | 13 | 7 | Ret | 6 | 3 | Ret | 9 | 3 | 3 | 13 |
| 6 | Team LeMans | 8 | 22 | 16 | 11 | 8 | 16 | 8 | Ret | Ret | Ret | 13 |
| 7 | ARTA | 55 | 16 | Ret | Ret | Ret | 2 | 4 | Ret | Ret | 7 | 12 |
| 7 | ARTA | 56 | 10 | 17 | Ret | 9 | 19 | Ret | DSQ | Ret | 4 | 12 |
| 8 | Reckless Cerumo | 11 | 12 | Ret | 10 | 4 | 4 | 5 | 7 | 5 | Ret | 10 |
| 9 | BOSS INGING | 33 | 5 | Ret | Ret | Ret | 5 | 10 | 4 | 9 | 12 | 6 |
| 9 | BOSS INGING | 34 | 14 | 13 | Ret | 11 | Ret | Ret | 11 | 7 | Ret | 6 |
| 10 | Kondo Racing | 3 | 6 | 4 | 14 | 10 | 10 | 18 | 13 | Ret | Ret | 4.5 |
| 10 | Kondo Racing | 4 | 7 | Ret | 9 | 13 | 13 | 12 | Ret | 6 | 13 | 4.5 |
| 11 | Team 5ZIGEN | 5 | 20 | 18 | 7 | Ret | 11 | 15 | 12 | Ret | 11 | 0 |
| 11 | Team 5ZIGEN | 6 | 21 | 15 | 12 | Ret | Ret | 17 | DSQ | 12 | 8 | 0 |
| 12 | DPR Direxiv | 27 | 15 | 12 | 13 | Ret | | | | | | 0 |
