= 2007 Formula Nippon Championship =

The 2007 Formula Nippon Championship was the thirty-fifth season of premier Japanese single-seater racing, and the twelfth under the Formula Nippon moniker. 12 different teams and 22 different drivers competed.

It was contested over nine rounds at five venues, with Okayama International Circuit hosting a Formula Nippon event for the first time, replacing Autopolis on the calendar.

Team Impul driver Tsugio Matsuda won the series championship for the first time despite failing to win a race. Takashi Kogure lost the championship after being disqualified from the final race at Suzuka Circuit.

== Teams and drivers ==
All teams used tyres supplied by Bridgestone and Lola FN06 chassis.

Team	#	Driver	Engine	Rounds
mobilecast Team Impul	1	(France) Benoît Tréluyer	Toyota RV8J	All
mobilecast Team Impul	2	(Japan) Tsugio Matsuda	Toyota RV8J	All
Carchs Kondo Racing	3	(Japan) Masataka Yanagida	Toyota RV8J	All
Carchs Kondo Racing	4	(Brazil) João Paulo de Oliveira	Toyota RV8J	All
SG team 5ZIGEN	5	(Japan) Katsuyuki Hiranaka	Honda HF386E	All
SG team 5ZIGEN	6	(Japan) Hiroki Yoshimoto	Honda HF386E	All
Forum Engineering Team LeMans	7	(Japan) Tatsuya Kataoka	Toyota RV8J	All
Forum Engineering Team LeMans	8	(Japan) Toranosuke Takagi	Toyota RV8J	All
Team Reckless Cerumo; Team Cerumo	11	(Japan) Yuji Tachikawa	Toyota RV8J	All
Team Reckless Cerumo; Team Cerumo	12	(Japan) Kota Sasaki	Toyota RV8J	1–5
Arabian Oasis Team Impul	19	(Japan) Satoshi Motoyama	Toyota RV8J	All
Arabian Oasis Team Impul	20	(Germany) Michael Krumm	Toyota RV8J	All
Kanaan Racing	27	(Brazil) Tony Kanaan	Honda HF386E	9
PIAA Nakajima Racing	31	(France) Loïc Duval	Honda HF386E	All
PIAA Nakajima Racing	32	(Japan) Takashi Kogure	Honda HF386E	All
Team BOSS INGING Formula Nippon	33	(Italy) Ronnie Quintarelli	Toyota RV8J	All
Team BOSS INGING Formula Nippon	34	(Japan) Naoki Yokomizo	Toyota RV8J	All
DHG TOM'S Racing	36	(Germany) André Lotterer	Toyota RV8J	All
DHG TOM'S Racing	37	(Japan) Seiji Ara	Toyota RV8J	All
DoCoMo Team Dandelion Racing	40	(Sweden) Björn Wirdheim	Honda HF386E	All
DoCoMo Team Dandelion Racing	41	(Brazil) Fabio Carbone	Honda HF386E	All
Autobacs Racing Team Aguri	55	(Japan) Yuji Ide	Honda HF386E	All
Autobacs Racing Team Aguri	56	(Japan) Toshihiro Kaneishi	Honda HF386E	All

== Race calendar and results ==
2007 venues

All races were held in Japan.

Round	Track	Date	Pole position	Fastest race lap	Winner	Team
1	Fuji	1 April	(France) Benoît Tréluyer	(France) Benoît Tréluyer	(France) Benoît Tréluyer	Team Impul
2	Suzuka	15 April	(Japan) Tsugio Matsuda	(Japan) Hiroki Yoshimoto	(Japan) Satoshi Motoyama	Team Impul
3	Motegi	20 May	(Japan) Tsugio Matsuda	(Japan) Takashi Kogure	(Japan) Takashi Kogure	Nakajima Racing
4	Okayama	10 June	(Japan) Takashi Kogure	(Japan) Tsugio Matsuda	(Italy) Ronnie Quintarelli	Team Boss Inging
5	Suzuka	8 July	(Japan) Tsugio Matsuda	(Japan) Tsugio Matsuda	(Japan) Satoshi Motoyama	Team Impul
6	Fuji	26 August	(Japan) Satoshi Motoyama	(France) Loïc Duval	(Germany) André Lotterer	TOM'S Racing
7	SUGO	16 September	(Japan) Takashi Kogure	(Japan) Naoki Yokomizo	(Japan) Takashi Kogure	Nakajima Racing
8	Motegi	21 October	(Japan) Takashi Kogure	(Japan) Takashi Kogure	(Japan) Takashi Kogure	Nakajima Racing
9	Suzuka	18 November	(Japan) Takashi Kogure	(Germany) André Lotterer	(Japan) Satoshi Motoyama	Team Impul

== Championship standings ==
=== Drivers' Championship ===
Scoring system

Position	1st	2nd	3rd	4th	5th	6th	7th	8th
Points	10	8	6	5	4	3	2	1

Rank	Driver	FUJ	SUZ	MOT	OKA	SUZ	FUJ	SUG	MOT	SUZ	Points
1	(Japan) Tsugio Matsuda	2	2	3	3	4	13	5	5	4	46
2	(France) Benoît Tréluyer	1	Ret	4	2	Ret	2	2	3	Ret	45
3	(Japan) Takashi Kogure	8	3	1	5	17	Ret	1	1	DSQ	41
4	(Japan) Satoshi Motoyama	Ret	1	6	10	1	Ret	4	11	1	38
5	(Germany) André Lotterer	Ret	5	2	Ret	13	1	7	4	2	37
6	(France) Loïc Duval	3	4	Ret	19	11	3	3	2	Ret	31
7	(Italy) Ronnie Quintarelli	5	6	5	1	Ret	7	8	6	14	27
8	(Brazil) Joao Paulo de Oliveira	DSQ	14	8	4	7	6	Ret	8	3	18
9	(Sweden) Björn Wirdheim	4	13	11	11	2	8	Ret	7	9	17
10	(Germany) Michael Krumm	6	7	7	8	5	Ret	Ret	15	Ret	12
11	(Japan) Seiji Ara	11	Ret	15	7	10	4	Ret	13	5	11
12	(Japan) Yuji Tachikawa	16	8	12	6	12	5	6	9	13	11
13	(Japan) Yuji Ide	14	10	16	Ret	3	16	Ret	Ret	10	6
14	(Japan) Tatsuya Kataoka	7	Ret	Ret	9	Ret	Ret	Ret	10	7	5
15	(Brazil) Fabio Carbone	15	15	Ret	13	6	15	9	18	Ret	3
16	(Japan) Toranosuke Takagi	Ret	12	9	16	8	9	10	12	8	3
17	(Japan) Naoki Yokomizo	10	9	13	12	19	10	13	Ret	12	0
18	(Japan) Toshihiro Kaneishi	12	17	10	Ret	9	11	Ret	14	Ret	0
19	(Japan) Masataka Yanagida	9	18	Ret	15	14	12	12	16	Ret	0
20	(Japan) Katsuyuki Hiranaka	Ret	11	17	14	18	14	11	17	11	0
21	(Japan) Hiroki Yoshimoto	13	19	18	17	15	17	Ret	Ret	15	0
22	(Japan) Kota Sasaki	17	16	14	18	16					0
–	(Brazil) Tony Kanaan (Note: Tony Kanaan was entered as a guest driver and was not eligible to score championship points.)									6	–

=== Teams' Championship ===
Rank	Team	Car	FUJ	SUZ	MOT	OKA	SUZ	FUJ	SUG	MOT	SUZ	Points
1	mobilecast IMPUL	1	1	Ret	4	2	Ret	2	2	3	Ret	91
1	mobilecast IMPUL	2	2	2	3	3	4	13	5	5	4	91
2	PIAA NAKAJIMA	31	3	4	Ret	19	11	3	3	2	Ret	72
2	PIAA NAKAJIMA	32	8	3	1	5	17	Ret	1	1	DSQ	72
3	Arabian Oasis IMPUL	19	Ret	1	6	10	1	Ret	4	11	1	50
3	Arabian Oasis IMPUL	20	6	7	7	8	5	Ret	Ret	15	Ret	50
4	DHG TOM'S	36	Ret	5	2	Ret	13	1	7	4	2	48
4	DHG TOM'S	37	11	Ret	15	7	10	4	Ret	13	5	48
5	Boss INGING	33	5	6	5	1	Ret	7	8	6	14	27
5	Boss INGING	34	10	9	13	12	19	10	13	Ret	12	27
6	DoCoMo Team Dandelion Racing	40	4	13	11	11	2	8	Ret	7	8	20
6	DoCoMo Team Dandelion Racing	41	15	15	Ret	13	5	15	9	18	Ret	20
7	Carchs Kondo Racing	3	9	18	Ret	15	14	12	12	16	Ret	18
7	Carchs Kondo Racing	4	DSQ	14	8	4	7	6	Ret	8	3	18
8	Forum Engineering Team LeMans	7	7	Ret	Ret	9	Ret	Ret	Ret	10	6	8
8	Forum Engineering Team LeMans	8	Ret	12	9	16	8	9	10	12	7	8
9	Team Cerumo	11						5	6	9	13	7
10	Autobacs Racing Team Aguri	55	14	10	16	Ret	3	16	Ret	Ret	10	6
10	Autobacs Racing Team Aguri	56	12	17	10	Ret	9	11	Ret	14	Ret	6
11	Team Reckless Cerumo	11	16	8	12	5	12					4
11	Team Reckless Cerumo	12	17	16	14	18	16					4
