= Naoki Yokomizo =

Japanese racing driver

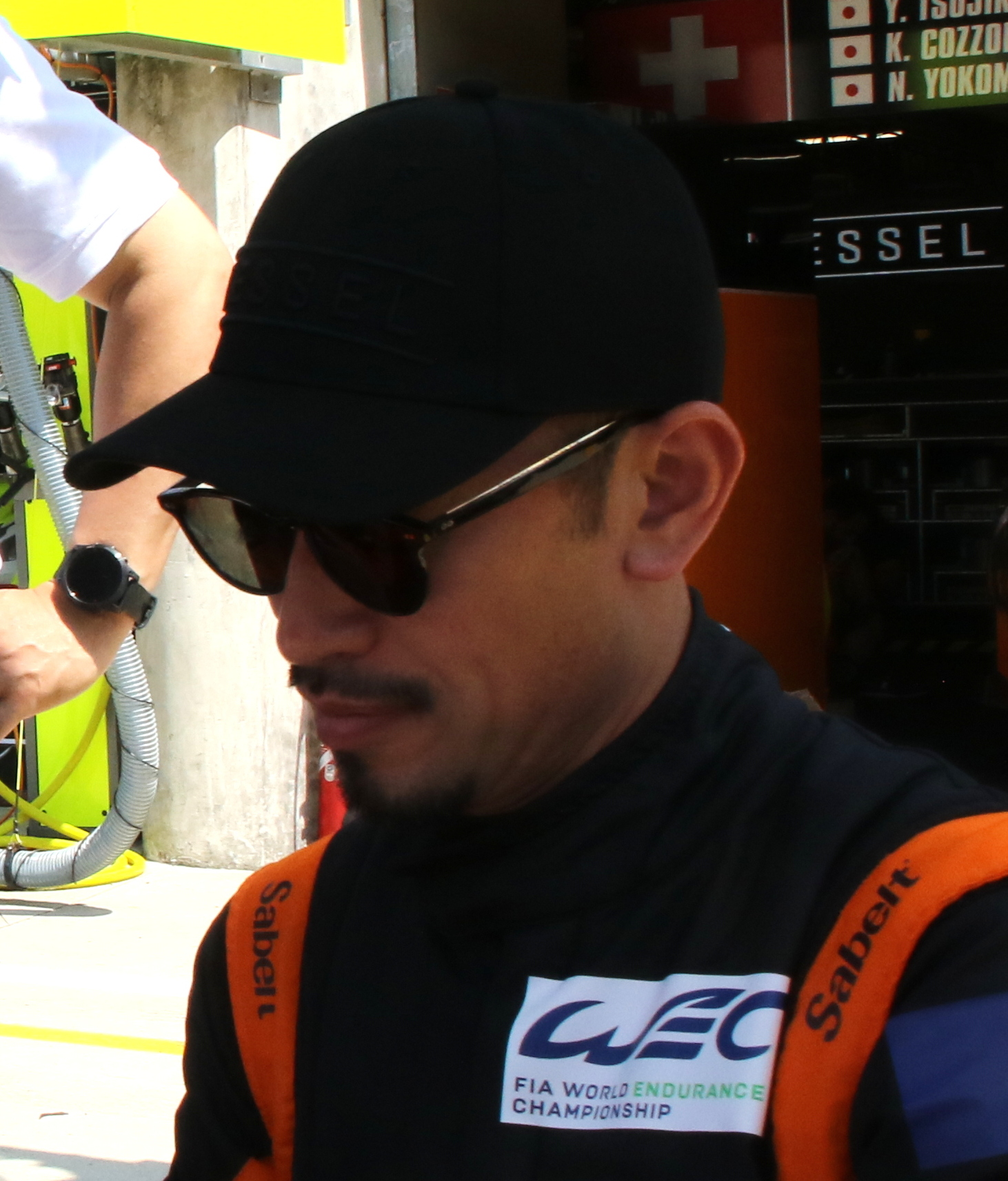
- Yokomizo at the 2023 24 Hours of Le Mans
- Nationality: (Japan) Japanese
- Born: 横溝直輝; 27 June 1980 (age 46) Kanagawa, Japan
- Categorisation: FIA Gold (until 2017); FIA Silver (2018–)

Naoki Yokomizo (横溝直輝, Yokomizo Naoki; born June 27, 1980 in Kanagawa) is a Japanese racing driver.

== Racing record ==
=== Complete Formula Nippon results ===
(key) (Races in bold indicate pole position) (Races in italics indicate fastest lap)

| Year | Team | 1 | 2 | 3 | 4 | 5 | 6 | 7 | 8 | 9 | 10 | 11 | DC | Pts |
|---|---|---|---|---|---|---|---|---|---|---|---|---|---|---|
| 2006 | Team BOSS・INGING Formula Nippon | FUJ; 14 | SUZ; 13 | MOT; Ret | SUZ; 11 | AUT; Ret | FUJ; Ret | SUG; 11 | MOT; 7 | SUZ; Ret | | | NC | 0 |
| 2007 | Team BOSS・INGING Formula Nippon | FUJ; 10 | SUZ; 9 | MOT; 13 | OKA; 12 | SUZ; 19 | FUJ; 10 | SUG; 13 | MOT; Ret | SUZ; 12 | | | NC | 0 |
| 2008 | Kondō Racing | FUJ; Ret | SUZ; 6 | MOT; 11 | OKA; 6 | SUZ1; 7 | SUZ2; 6 | MOT1; Ret | MOT2; 11 | FUJ1; 12 | FUJ2; 12 | SUG; Ret | 12th | 12 |

=== Complete Super GT results ===
| Year | Team | Car | Class | 1 | 2 | 3 | 4 | 5 | 6 | 7 | 8 | 9 | DC | Pts |
|---|---|---|---|---|---|---|---|---|---|---|---|---|---|---|
| 2005 | Kraft | Toyota Supra | GT500 | OKA; Ret | FUJ; 7 | SEP; 12 | SUG; 14 | MOT; 11 | FUJ; 16 | AUT; 12 | SUZ; 16 | | 19th | 4 |
| 2006 | Hasemi MotorSport | Nissan Z | GT500 | SUZ; 9 | OKA; 4 | FUJ; 12 | SEP; 7 | SUG; 13 | SUZ; 8 | MOT; 11 | AUT; 8 | FUJ; 8 | 15th | 32 |
| 2007 | MOLA | Nissan Z | GT300 | SUZ; 13 | OKA; 6 | FUJ; 18 | SEP; 3 | SUG; 6 | SUZ; 4 | MOT; 24 | **AUT**; 2 | FUJ; 18 | 7th | 48 |
| 2008 | Hasemi MotorSport | Nissan GT-R | GT500 | SUZ; 15 | OKA; 6 | FUJ; 15 | SEP; 9 | SUG; 11 | SUZ; 9 | **MOT**; 1 | AUT; 6 | FUJ; 13 | 12th | 39 |
| 2010 | MOLA | Nissan Z | GT300 | SUZ; 2 | OKA; 1 | FUJ; 12 | SEP; 6 | SUG; 8 | SUZ; 16 | FUJ; C | MOT; 14 | | 6th | 43 |
| 2011 | Thunder Asia Racing | Mosler MT900M | GT300 | OKA | FUJ | SEP | SUG; Ret | SUZ; 18 | FUJ | AUT | MOT | | NC | 0 |
| 2012 | Team TAISAN | Porsche 911 GT3 R | GT300 | **OKA**; 2 | FUJ; 8 | SEP; 2 | SUG; 5 | SUZ; Ret | FUJ; 4 | AUT; 2 | MOT; 1 | | **1st** | **82** |
| 2013 | Team TAISAN | Porsche 911 GT3 R | GT300 | OKA; 10 | FUJ; NC | SEP; 11 | SUG; 3 | SUZ; 7 | FUJ; 19 | AUT; 8 | MOT; 10 | | 12th | 25 |
| 2014 | Team TAISAN | Nissan GT-R Nismo GT3 | GT300 | OKA; 19 | FUJ; 9 | AUT; 9 | SUG; 5 | FUJ; 17 | SUZ; Ret | CHA | MOT; 16 | | 22nd | 10 |
| 2015 | Direction Racing | Ferrari 458 GT3 | GT300 | OKA; 11 | FUJ; 13 | CHA; 18 | FUJ | SUZ; 9 | SUG; 11 | AUT; 4 | MOT; 10 | | 19th | 12 |
| 2016 | Lamborghini Team Direction | Lamborghini Huracan GT3 | GT300 | OKA; 21 | FUJ; 19 | SUG; 15 | FUJ; 18 | SUZ; 25 | CHA; 13 | MOT; 14 | MOT; 16 | | NC | 0 |
| 2018 | Car Guy Racing | Honda NSX GT3 | GT300 | OKA; 15 | FUJ; 26 | SUZ; 21 | CHA | FUJ; 17 | SUG | AUT; Ret | MOT; 23 | | NC | 0 |
| 2019 | Pacific Racing Team | Porsche 911 GT3 R | GT300 | OKA; 15 | FUJ; 22 | SUZ; 22 | CHA; 16 | FUJ; 19 | AUT; 22 | SUG; 9 | MOT; 15 | | 27th | 2 |
| 2021 | Pacific Car Guy Racing | Ferrari 488 GT3 EVO | GT300 | OKA | FUJ | SUZ; 4 | MOT; 7 | SUG | AUT | MOT; 19 | FUJ | | 19th | 12 |
| 2022 | Pacific Car Guy Racing | Ferrari 488 GT3 EVO | GT300 | OKA; 4 | FUJ | SUZ | FUJ | SUZ; 11 | SUG | AUT | MOT | | 24th | 8 |

=== Complete Intercontinental Le Mans Cup results ===
| Year | Team | Car | Class | 1 | 2 | 3 | 4 | 5 | 6 | 7 |
|---|---|---|---|---|---|---|---|---|---|---|
| 2011 | Tokai Univ. | Courage LC70 | LMP1 | SEB | SPA | LMN | IMO | SIL | PET | ZHU; 8 |

=== Complete Asian Le Mans Series results ===
| Year | Team | Car | Class | 1 | 2 | 3 | 4 | DC | Pts |
|---|---|---|---|---|---|---|---|---|---|
| 2013 | Team TAISAN | Ferrari 458 | LMGTE | INJ; 1 | FUJ | ZHU; 1 | SEP; 1 | **1st** | **78** |

=== 24 Hours of Le Mans results ===
| Year | Team | Co-Drivers | Car | Class | Laps | Pos. | Class Pos. |
|---|---|---|---|---|---|---|---|
| 2023 | (Switzerland) Kessel Racing | (Japan) Kei Cozzolino (Japan) Yorikatsu Tsujiko | Ferrari 488 GTE Evo | GTE; Am | 303 | 38th | 9th |
