= Masataka Yanagida =

Japanese racing driver

Masataka Yanagida 柳田真孝
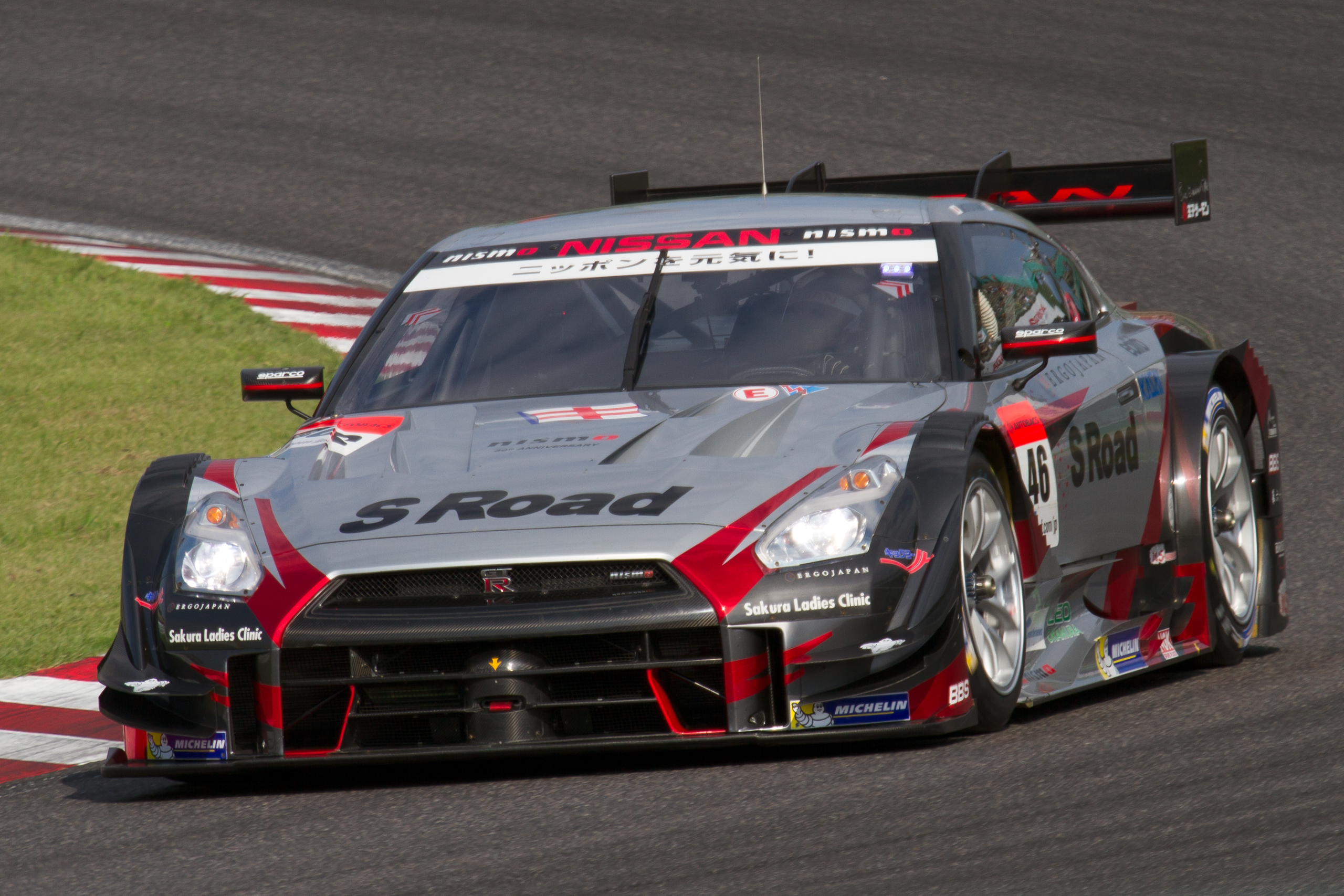
- Yanagida in 2014
- Nationality: Japan
- Born: 4 June 1979 (age 47) Tokyo, Japan
- Categorisation: FIA Gold

Masataka Yanagida (柳田真孝, Yanagida Masataka, born 4 June 1979, in Tokyo) is a Japanese racing driver. He notably won the Super GT title four times, from 2003 to 2012 in GT300 then GT500. (Note: Specific years: 2003, 2010, 2011, 2012)

== Career ==
The son of successful racing driver Haruhito Yanagida, a runner-up in the Japanese Touring Car Championship, Masataka began his career in karting in 1993. In 1997, he raced in Formula Renault Campus in France, before stepping up to the main French Formula Renault Championship in 1998. He moved on to Formula Dream in 1999, taking five victories in the 2000 season.

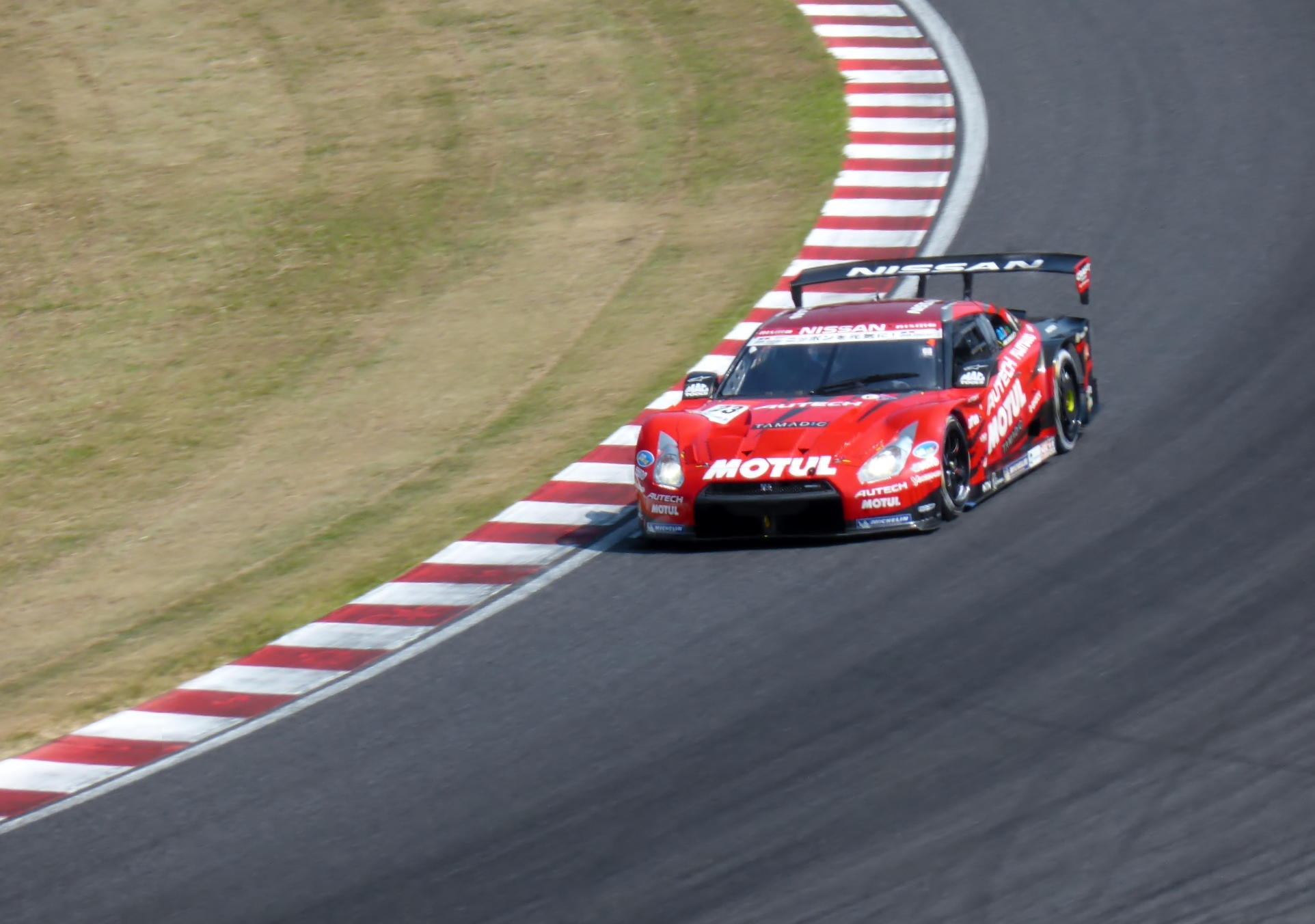
Yanagida's Super GT career yielded four titles, all with Nissan (pictured in 2013).

In 2001, Yanagida began racing in Japanese F3 and Japanese GT. He finished seventh in the F3 standings and fourth in the GT300 class in Japanese GT, where he raced with Yuji Ide. He improved to finish third in GT300 in 2002, before winning the class in 2003. He returned to F3 in 2004, but could only finish 10th. He moved up to the GT500 class of Super GT in 2005, finishing fifth in the standings, sharing with Michael Krumm.

Yanigada made his World Touring Car Championship debut at the 2010 FIA WTCC Race of Japan at Okayama for the Wiechers-Sport team.

== Racing record ==
=== Career summary ===
Season	Series	Team name	Races	Wins	Poles	F/Laps	Podiums	Points	Position
2001	All-Japan Formula Three	Toda Racing	19	0	0	0	0	80	7th
2001	All-Japan GT - GT300	Hasemi Motorsport	7	0	0	0	3	53	4th
2002	All-Japan GT - GT300	Hasemi Motorsport	8	1	1	0	2	80	3rd
2003	All-Japan Formula Three	Threebond Racing	2	0	0	0	0	2	17th
2003	All-Japan GT - GT300	Hasemi Motorsport	8	0	1	0	4	77	1st
2004	All-Japan Formula Three	Threebond Racing	20	0	0	0	1	58	10th
2004	All-Japan GT - GT300	Team Daishin	7	0	0	0	1	33	6th
2004	Super Taikyu - Class3	RS Nakaharu	2	1	0	0	0	132	1st
2004	Super Taikyu - Class3	C-West Labs	1	0	0	0	1	116	2nd
2004	Suzuka 1000km	Nismo	1	0	0	0	0	N/A	NC
2005	Super GT - GT500	Nismo	8	0	1	0	2	57	5th
2006	Formula Nippon	Kondo Racing	9	0	1	0	0	1	14th
2006	Super GT - GT500	Kondo Racing	9	0	0	0	1	34	13th
2006	Tokachi 24 Hours	C-West Labs	1	0	0	0	1	N/A	3rd
2007	Formula Nippon	Kondo Racing	9	0	0	0	0	0	NC
2007	Super GT - GT500	Hasemi Motorsport	9	0	1	0	0	30	12th
2007	Super Taikyu - ST1	Petronas Syntium Team	7	0	3	0	1	69	5th
2008	Super GT - GT500	Nismo	9	0	2	1	2	57	7th
2008	Super Taikyu - ST1	Petronas Syntium Team	7	2	2	2	3	127	2nd
2009	Super GT - GT300	MOLA	9	1	0	0	1	62	7th
2009	Super Taikyu - ST1	Petronas Syntium Team	8	5	5	2	1	128	1st
2009	MMER 12 Hours	Petronas Syntium Team	1	0	0	0	1	N/A	2nd
2010	Super GT - GT300	Hasemi Motorsport	7	1	1	0	3	64	1st
2010	Super Taikyu - ST1	Petronas Syntium Team	7	6	5	3	1	142	1st
2010	Dubai 24 Hour	Petronas Syntium Team	1	0	0	0	1	N/A	2nd
2010	World Touring Car Championship	Wiechers-Sport	2	0	0	0	0	0	NC
2011	Super GT - GT500	MOLA	8	1	3	3	4	90	1st
2011	Super Taikyu - ST1	Petronas Syntium Team	6	6	3	3	0	136	1st
2011	MMER 12 Hours	Petronas Syntium Team	1	1	0	0	0	N/A	1st
2012	Super GT - GT500	MOLA	8	2	1	1	3	93	1st
2012	Super Taikyu - GT3	Petronas Syntium Team	2	0	2	0	1	94	2nd
2012	MMER 12 Hours	Petronas Syntium Team	1	1	0	0	0	N/A	1st
2013	Super GT - GT500	Nismo	8	0	2	0	3	50	6th
2014	Super GT - GT500	MOLA	8	0	1	0	1	31	11th
2014	Spa 24 Hours	Nissan GT Academy Team RJN	1	0	0	0	0	N/A	38th
2015	Super GT - GT500	MOLA	8	1	1	0	1	50	6th
2015	Super Taikyu - ST-X	GTNET Motorsports	1	0	0	0	0	35.5	8th
2015-16	Asian Le Mans Series - LMP3	Team AAI	4	0	0	0	2	37	3rd
2016	Super GT - GT500	Kondo Racing	8	2	0	1	0	43	7th
2016	Super Taikyu - ST-X	Endless Sports	2	0	0	0	2	116.5	2nd
2016	Inter Proto Series	B-Max Racing Team	4	0	0	0	1	?	?
2019-20	Asian Le Mans Series - LMP2	Eurasia Motorsport	2	0	1	0	0	1	11th
2025	Super Taikyu - ST-Z	Team ZeroOne							
2026	Super Taikyu - ST-Z	Team ZeroOne							

=== Complete Japanese Formula 3 results ===
Year	Team	Engine	1	2	3	4	5	6	7	8	9	10	11	12	13	14	15	16	17	18	19	20	DC	Pts
2001	Toda Racing	Mugen-Honda	SUZ1; Ret	SUZ2; 8	TSU1; 13	TSU2; 5	FUJ1; 14	FUJ2; Ret	MIN1; 6	MIN2; 4	MOT1; 4	MOT2; 6	SUZ; 7	SUG1; 8	SUG2; 9	SEN1; 7	SEN2; 9	TAI1; 7	TAI2; Ret	MOT1; 4	MOT2; 5		7th	80
2003	Threebond Racing	Threebond-Nissan	SUZ1	SUZ2	FUJ1; 13	FUJ2; 9	TAI1	TAI2	MOT1	MOT2	SUZ1	SUZ2	SUG1	SUG2	TSU1	TSU2	SUG1	SUG2	MIN1	MIN2	MOT1	MOT2	17th	2
2004	Threebond Racing	Threebond-Nissan	SUZ1; 12	SUZ2; 8	TSU1; 12	TSU2; 12	TAI1; 5	TAI2; 11	MOT1; 14	MOT2; 9	SUZ1; 9	SUZ2; 3	SUG1; 6	SUG2; 5	MIN1; 10	MIN2; Ret	SEN1; 7	SEN2; Ret	MIN1; 7	MIN2; 7	MOT1; 8	MOT2; 10	10th	58

=== Complete Formula Nippon results ===
Year	Team	Engine	1	2	3	4	5	6	7	8	9	DC	Pts
2006	Kondo Racing	Toyota	FUJ; 7	SUZ; Ret	MOT; 9	SUZ; 13	AUT; 13	FUJ; 12	SUG; Ret	MOT; 6	SUZ; 13	14th	1
2007	Kondo Racing	Toyota	FUJ; 9	SUZ; 18	MOT; Ret	OKA; 15	SUZ; 14	FUJ; 12	SUG; 12	MOT; 16	SUZ; Ret	NC	0

=== Complete Super GT results ===
Year	Team	Car	Class	1	2	3	4	5	6	7	8	9	DC	Pts
2001	Hasemi Motorsport	Nissan Silvia	GT300	TAI; 6	FUJ; 2	SUG; 12	FUJ; 2	MOT; 9	SUZ; 2	MIN; 12			4th	53
2002	Hasemi Motorsport	Nissan Silvia	GT300	TAI; 4	FUJ; Ret	SUG; 1	SEP; 3	FUJ; 3	MOT; 4	MIN; Ret	SUZ; Ret		3rd	70
2003	Hasemi Motorsport	Nissan Fairlady Z	GT300	TAI; 6	FUJ; 2	SUG; 17	FUJ; 3	FUJ; 21	MOT; 3	AUT; 4	SUZ; 2		1st	77
2004	Team Daishin	Nissan Fairlady Z	GT300	TAI; 19	SUG; 14	SEP; 6	TOK; 3	MOT; 4	AUT; 19	SUZ; 7			6th	33
2005	NISMO	Nissan Z	GT500	OKA; 12	FUJ; 2	SEP; 6	SUG; 7	MOT; 4	FUJ; 9	AUT; 2	SUZ; 8		5th	57
2006	Kondo Racing	Nissan Z	GT500	SUZ; 10	OKA; 10	FUJ; 10	SEP; 8	SUG; 10	SUZ; 5	MOT; 6	AUT; 14	FUJ; 3	13th	34
2007	Hasemi Motorsport	Nissan Z	GT500	SUZ; 10	OKA; 13	FUJ; 4	SEP; 7	SUG; 4	SUZ; 8	MOT; 11	AUT; 7	FUJ; 15	12th	30
2008	NISMO	Nissan GT-R	GT500	SUZ; 2	OKA; 15	FUJ; 12	SEP; 2	SUG; 13	SUZ; 4	MOT; 7	AUT; 5	FUJ; 11	7th	57
2009	MOLA	Nissan Fairlady Z	GT300	OKA; 7	SUZ; 3	FUJ; 6	SEP; 4	SUG; 6	SUZ; 1	FUJ; 9	AUT; 8	MOT; 7	7th	62
2010	Hasemi Motorsport	Nissan Fairlady Z	GT300	SUZ; 5	OKA; 3	FUJ; 5	SEP; 5	SUG; 2	SUZ; Ret	FUJ; C	MOT; 1		1st	64
2011	MOLA	Nissan GT-R	GT500	OKA; 6	FUJ; 10	SEP; 2	SUG; 1	SUZ; 2	FUJ; 7	AUT; 2	MOT; 2		1st	90
2012	MOLA	Nissan GT-R	GT500	OKA; 7	FUJ; 8	SEP; 14	SUG; 3	SUZ; 1	FUJ; 2	AUT; 1	MOT; 2		1st	93
2013	NISMO	Nissan GT-R	GT500	OKA; 3	FUJ; Ret	SEP; 9	SUG; 3	SUZ; 2	FUJ; 9	AUT; 8	MOT; 8		6th	50
2014	MOLA	Nissan GT-R	GT500	OKA; 10	FUJ; Ret	AUT; 2	SUG; 7	FUJ; 6	SUZ; 13	BUR; Ret	MOT; 5		11th	31
2015	MOLA	Nissan GT-R	GT500	OKA; 8	FUJ; 10	CHA; 1	FUJ; 14	SUZ; 6	SUG; 2	AUT; 6	MOT; Ret		6th	50
2016	Kondo Racing	Nissan GT-R	GT500	OKA; 13	FUJ; 9	SUG; 1	FUJ; Ret	SUZ; 12	CHA; 13	MOT; 1	MOT; 10		7th	43
2017	Audi Team Hitotsuyama	Audi R8 LMS	GT300	OKA; 14	FUJ; 14	AUT; 13	SUG; 20	FUJ; 10	SUZ; Ret	CHA; 23	MOT; 8		20th	5
2018	Runup Sports	Nissan GT-R Nismo GT3	GT300	OKA	FUJ	SUZ	CHA	FUJ; 12	SUG	AUT	MOT		NC	0
2020	Cars Tokai Dream28	Lotus Evora MC GT300	GT300	FUJ (1); 12	FUJ (2); 1	SUZ (1); 3	MOT (1); 13	FUJ (3); 27	SUZ (2); 11	MOT (2); 24	FUJ (4); 23		10th	31
2021	Arnage Racing	Mercedes-AMG GT3	GT300	OKA; 18	FSW; 21	SUZ; 22	TRM; 19	SUG; 24	AUT; 14	TRM; 21	FSW; DNS		NC	0
2022	BUSOU Drago Corse	Nissan GT-R Nismo GT3	GT300	OKA; 12	FUJ; 2	SUZ; 6	FUJ	SUZ	SUG	AUT	MOT		20th	12.5
2023	BMW M Team Studie x CRS	BMW M4 GT3	GT300	OKA	FUJ; 13	SUZ; 1	FUJ; 2	SUZ	SUG	AUT	MOT		10th	35

* Season still in progress

=== Complete Asian Le Mans Series ===
Year	Team	Machine	Engine	Class	1	2	3	4	DC	Pts
2015-16	Team-AAI	ADESS-03	Nissan	LMP3	FUJ; Ret	SEP; 2	BUR; 2	SEP; Ret	3rd	37
2019-20	Eurasia Motorsport	Ligier JS P217	Gibson	LMP2	SHA; Ret	BEN	SEP; Ret	BUR	11th	1

== Notes and references ==
=== References ===
Sporting positions
Preceded by Takashi Kogure; Loïc Duval	Super GT (GT500) Champion; 2011–2012 with: Ronnie Quintarelli	Succeeded by Kohei Hirate; Yuji Tachikawa
