= Ronnie Quintarelli =

Italian racecar driver (born 1979)

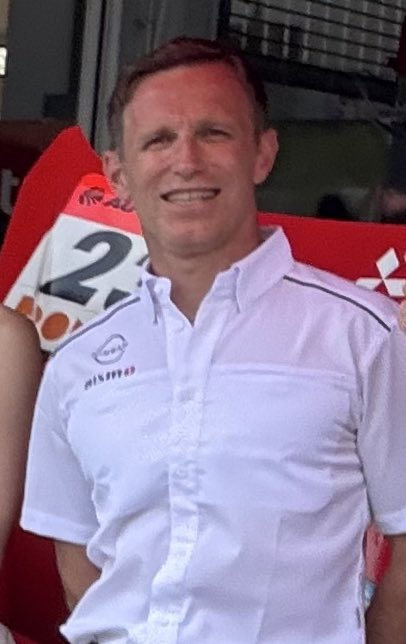
- Quintarelli at Super GT Malaysia Round in 2025
- Nationality: Italian
- Born: 9 August 1979 (age 47) Negrar, Italy

Super GT career
- Years active: 2005–2024
- Teams: SARD, Lexus Team Cerumo, Lexus Team Kraft, Hasemi Motorsport, Team Impul, Mola, Nismo
- Starts: 150
- Championships: 4 (2011, 2012, 2014 & 2015)
- Wins: 18
- Podiums: 46
- Poles: 16

Previous series
- 2005-2008: Formula Nippon

Championship titles
- 2011-12, 14-15 2004: Super GT; Japanese Formula 3 Championship

Ronnie Quintarelli (born 9 August 1979) is an Italian racing driver who competed in Super GT from 2005 to 2024. A four-time champion, he jointly holds the all-time record for the most drivers' championship titles won in the GT500 class of Super GT (shared with Sho Tsuboi).

== Biography ==
Quintarelli first encountered motorsports at the age of six when his father gave him a small go-kart. After starting his karting career in 1990, he scored two second place finishes in the World Formula Super A championship and a European Formula C title. He made his single seaters debut in 1999 when he drove in five rounds of the Formula Opel Cup in Croatia. He finished second in the standings, behind his teammate Antony Bertocchi, who competed in every round. In 2000, he entered the Italian Formula Renault Championship and ended up third with Prema Powerteam. He also entered the Eurocup Formula Renault 2.0, the German Formula Three Championship and the Formula Volkswagen Germany.

In 2005, Quintarelli scored his maiden GT win in the 1000 km Suzuka race with André Couto and Hayanari Shimoda and later made his way to the Super GT. After spending two seasons under the Lexus banner, Quintarelli moved to the Nissan camp, securing multiple victories. Driving for the Mola team, he won two consecutive titles in 2011 and 2012 partnered by Masataka Yanagida. He later joined the Nismo Official Team alongside Tsugio Matsuda. The pairing cruised to two more titles in 2014 and 2015 which made Quintarelli the most titled driver in the history of the series until Sho Tsuboi equaled him in 2025. While still fighting for the title in 2016 with a third place, the Nissan teams struggled at the beginning of the following year but Quintarelli and Matsuda rallied to finish the season in second place. In 2018, they were again steadily at the front of the Nissan roster, and managed to snatch a win at Fuji Speedway. Unfortunately, they would not hit the top-five again, eventually taking eighth place in the championship.

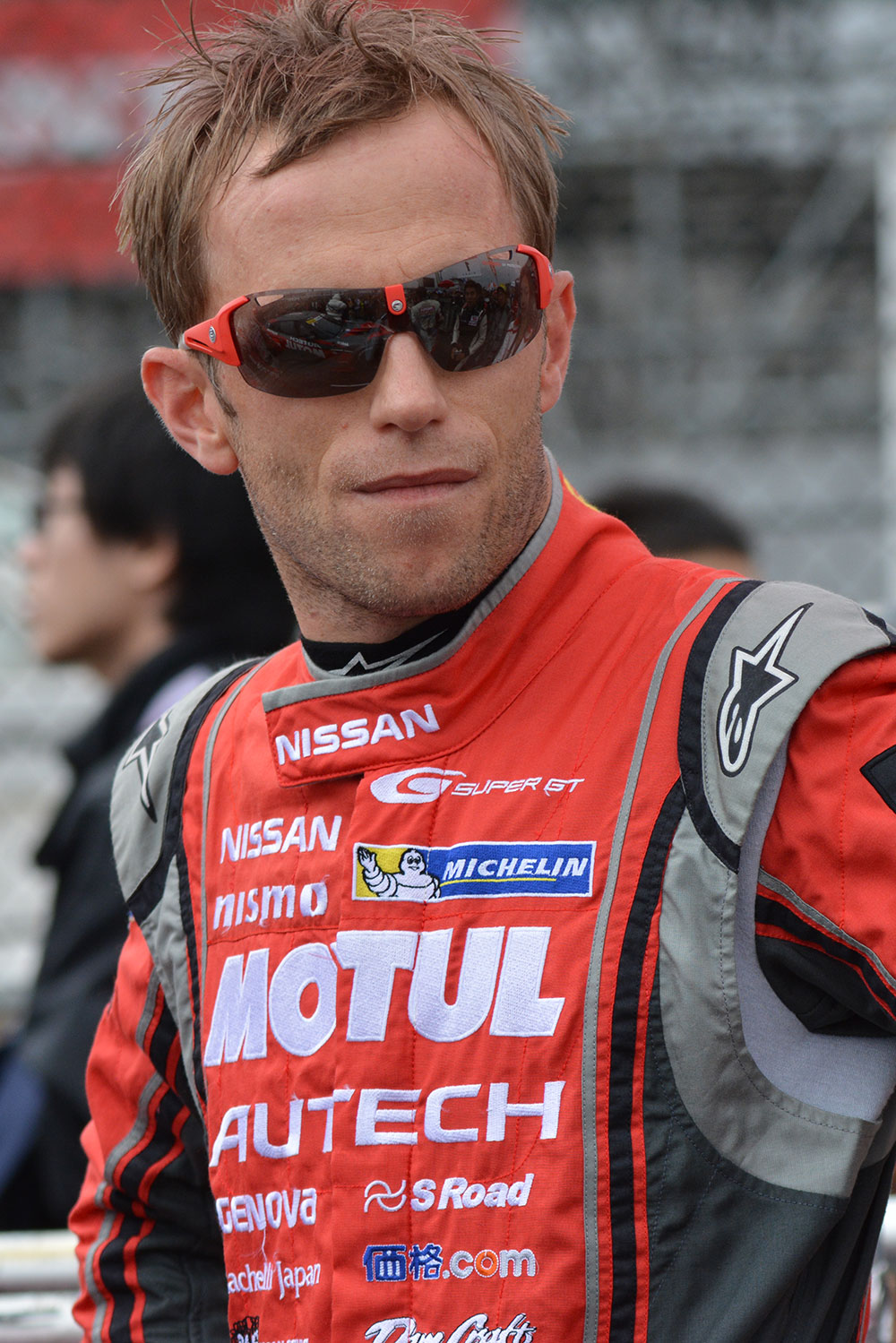
Quintarelli in 2015 SUPER GT Motegi

In 2019, the Nismo pairing completed the championship in third position with four podium finishes and three pole positions scored by Quintarelli himself. In 2020, they remained in contention for the title until the very last race by taking two wins in the two rounds held at Suzuka. The final event of the season at Fuji Speedway (the track hosted four events to simplify logistics during the COVID-19 pandemic) saw a record 11 teams in contention for the title with tight margins. Quintarelli moved from sixth place to the lead in the opening lap, although tyre issues cost him track position later. He and Matsuda would eventually end up ninth in the race and sixth in the championships. They returned to the Nismo team for 2021.

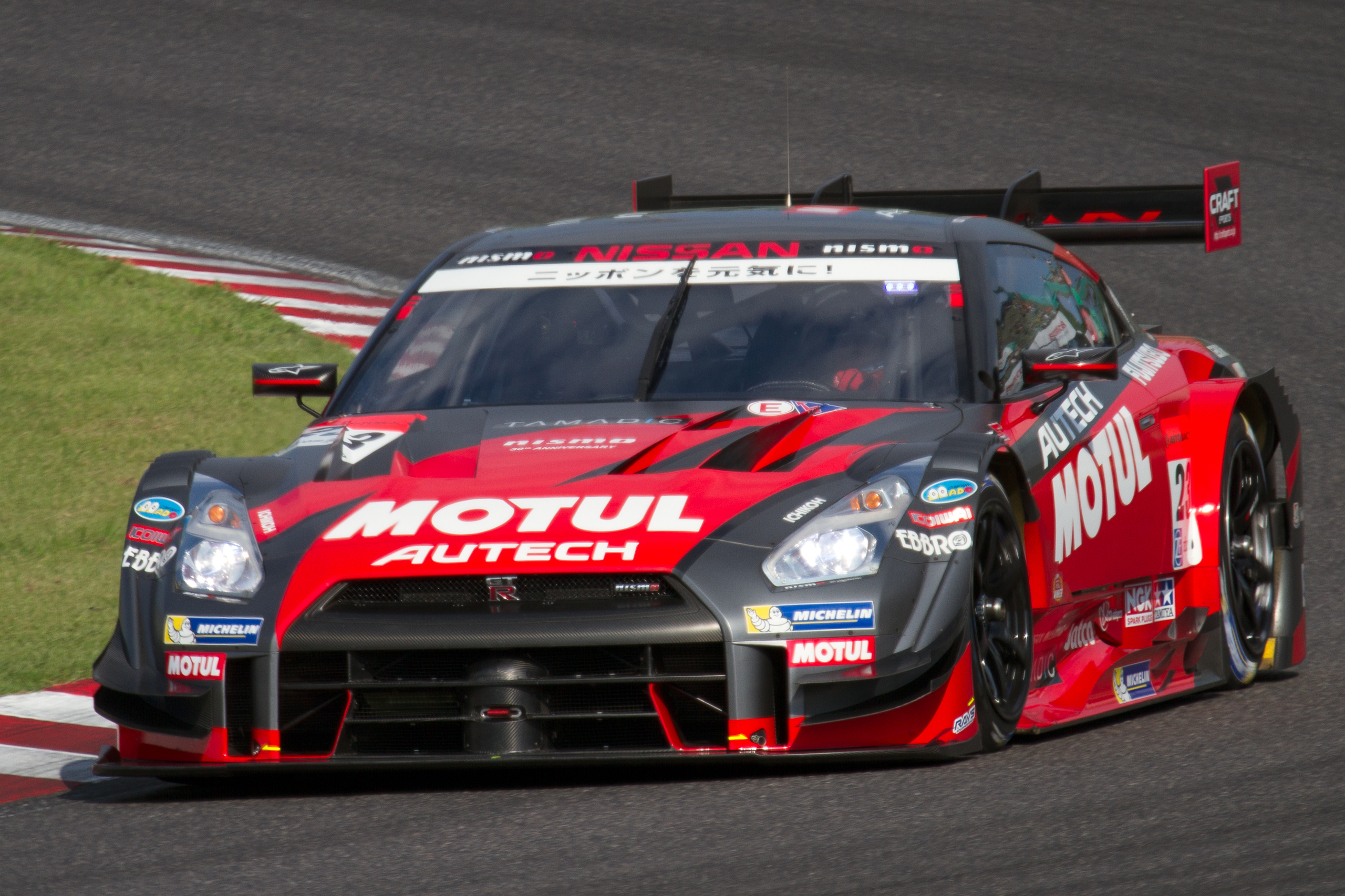
Quintarelli driving in the 2014 Super GT season at Suzuka

The 2021 season started with a double retirement as contact involving team-mate Tsugio Matsuda at Okayama and a broken engine at Fuji Speedway impacted the rest of the season. The No. 23 Nismo car still secured one win at Suzuka and a third place at Autopolis, but the Quintarelli-Matsuda pairing had to settle for ninth in points. For the 2022 season, all the Nissan teams debuted the new Z GT500 model. However, the Nismo team suffered the tragic loss of its Director Yutaka Suzuki, who prematurely died during the winter. Despite the positive start at Okayama with a third place, contact and a mechanical issue jeopardized the following two events. A brilliant second place in wet conditions at Sugo put Quintarelli and Matsuda back in title contention. Unfortunately, two more technical problems in the two final events at Autopolis and Motegi forced the pairing to seventh place in the standings.

Finishing in third in Okayama International Circuit in the first race of the 2022, Quintarelli extended his all-time record streak in Super GT to 15th consecutive year at least 1 podium/season as a non-Japanese driver.

== Personal life ==
Based in Yokohama, Kanagawa. Quintarelli speaks Japanese fluently and serves as a TV color commentator for the Super Formula series. In recent years, he devoted his efforts towards the people affected by earthquakes, raising awareness and providing support to the 2011 Tōhoku earthquake and tsunami relief. Together with fellow Super GT regular Andrea Caldarelli, he led a fundraising campaign in favour of the populations impacted by the 2016–2017 Central Italy earthquakes. His cross-border charity efforts, together with his sporting results, earned him the title of Officer of the Order of the Star of Italy.

== Awards ==

5th Class/Officer: Order of the Star of Italy: 2015

== Racing record ==
=== Career summary ===
| Season | Series | Team | Races | Poles | Wins | Points | Position |
|---|---|---|---|---|---|---|---|
| 1999 | Formula Opel Cup Croatia | Vergani RT | 5 | * | 3 | 44 | **2nd** |
| 2000 | Formula Renault 2000 Italia | Prema Powerteam | * | 2 | 1 | * | **3rd** |
| 2001 | Formula Renault 2000 Eurocup | Cram Competition | 5 | 1 | 1 | 66 | 7th |
| 2002 | Formula Volkswagen | Team Penker Racing | * | 4 | 2 | * | **2nd** |
| 2002 | GC-21 | INGING Motorsport | 1 | 0 | 1 | N/A | NC |
| 2003 | Japanese Formula 3 Championship | INGING Motorsport | 20 | 0 | 0 | 200 | 4th |
| 2003 | Macau Grand Prix | JB Motorsport with INGING | 1 | 0 | 0 | 0 | 4th |
| 2003 | Korea Super Prix | JB Motorsport with INGING | 1 | 0 | 0 | 0 | 16th |
| 2004 | Japanese Formula 3 Championship | INGING Motorsport | 20 | 4 | 8 | 251 | **1st** |
| 2004 | Macau Grand Prix | INGING Motorsport | 1 | 0 | 0 | 0 | 8th |
| 2004 | Bahrain Super Prix | INGING Motorsport | 1 | 0 | 0 | 0 | 22nd |
| 2005 | Formula Nippon | Kondo Racing Team | 6 | 0 | 0 | 12 | 9th |
| 2005 | Super GT - GT500 | SARD | 8 | 0 | 0 | 21 | 16th |
| 2005 | 1000 km Suzuka | SARD | 1 | 0 | 1 | N/A | **1st** |
| 2006 | Formula Nippon | Team Boss INGING | 9 | 0 | 0 | 6 | 10th |
| 2006 | Super GT - GT500 | Cerumo | 1 | 0 | 0 | 9 | 24th |
| 2006 | Formula One | Midland F1 | Test driver | | | | |
| 2007 | Formula Nippon | Team Boss INGING | 9 | 0 | 1 | 27 | 7th |
| 2007 | Super GT - GT500 | Bandai Toyota Team Kraft | 3 | 0 | 0 | 2 | 24th |
| 2008 | Formula Nippon | Cerumo/INGING | 8 | 0 | 0 | 21.5 | 9th |
| 2008 | Super GT - GT500 | Hasemi Motorsport | 9 | 1 | 1 | 39 | 12th |
| 2009 | Super GT - GT500 | Hasemi Motorsport | 9 | 1 | 1 | 49 | 7th |
| 2010 | Super GT - GT500 | Team Impul | 7 | 0 | 1 | 47 | 5th |
| 2011 | Super GT - GT500 | Mola | 8 | 1 | 1 | 90 | **1st** |
| 2012 | Super GT - GT500 | Mola | 8 | 1 | 2 | 93 | **1st** |
| 2013 | Super GT - GT500 | Nismo | 8 | 1 | 0 | 50 | 6th |
| 2014 | Super GT - GT500 | Nismo | 8 | 2 | 2 | 81 | **1st** |
| 2015 | Super GT - GT500 | Nismo | 8 | 2 | 2 | 79 | **1st** |
| 2016 | Super GT - GT500 | Nismo | 8 | 0 | 2 | 62 | **3rd** |
| 2017 | Super GT - GT500 | Nismo | 8 | 1 | 1 | 82 | **2nd** |
| 2018 | Super GT - GT500 | Nismo | 8 | 1 | 1 | 43 | 8th |
| 2019 | Super GT - GT500 | Nismo | 8 | 3 | 0 | 52.5 | **3rd** |
| 2019 | Deutsche Tourenwagen Masters | Nismo | 1 | 0 | 0 | 0 | NC† |
| 2020 | Super GT - GT500 | Nismo | 8 | 0 | 2 | 51 | 6th |
| 2021 | Super GT - GT500 | Nismo | 8 | 0 | 1 | 41 | 9th |
| 2022 | Super GT - GT500 | Nismo | 8 | 1 | 0 | 37 | 7th |
| 2022 | Super Taikyu - ST-Q | NISMO | | | | | |
| 2023 | Super GT - GT500 | Nismo | 8 | 1 | 1 | 56 | **3rd** |
| 2024 | Super GT - GT500 | NISMO | 8 | 0 | 0 | 45 | 8th |
| 2024 | Super Taikyu - ST-Q | NISMO | | | | | |
| 2025 | Super Taikyu - ST-Z | Team ZeroOne | | | | | |
| 2026 | Super Taikyu - ST-Z | Team ZeroOne | | | | | |

^{†} As Quintarelli was a guest driver, he was ineligible to score championship points.

=== Complete Japanese Formula 3 results ===
(key) (Races in bold indicate pole position) (Races in italics indicate fastest lap)

| Year | Team | Engine | 1 | 2 | 3 | 4 | 5 | 6 | 7 | 8 | 9 | 10 | 11 | 12 | 13 | 14 | 15 | 16 | 17 | 18 | 19 | 20 | DC | Pts |
|---|---|---|---|---|---|---|---|---|---|---|---|---|---|---|---|---|---|---|---|---|---|---|---|---|
| 2003 | INGING | Toyota | SUZ; 1; 3 | SUZ; 2; 3 | FUJ; 1; 3 | FUJ; 2; 5 | TAI; 1; 3 | TAI; 2; 3 | MOT; 1; 5 | MOT; 2; 6 | SUZ; 1; 6 | SUZ; 2; 6 | SUG; 1; 2 | SUG; 2; 2 | TSU; 1; 4 | TSU; 2; 2 | SUG; 1; 4 | SUG; 2; 3 | MIN; 1; 4 | MIN; 2; 2 | MOT; 1; 2 | MOT; 2; 2 | 4th | 200 |
| 2004 | INGING | Toyota | SUZ; 1; 9 | SUZ; 2; 6 | TSU; 1; 13 | **TSU**; **2**; 1 | OKA; 1; 2 | OKA; 2; 1 | MOT; 1; 2 | MOT; 2; 1 | **SUZ**; **1**; 4 | SUZ; 2; 1 | SUG; 1; 1 | SUG; 2; 1 | MIN; 1; 3 | MIN; 2; 6 | SEN; 1; 2 | SEN; 2; 13 | **MIN**; **1**; 1 | **MIN**; **2**; 1 | MOT; 1 Ret | MOT; 2; 3 | 1st | 251 |

=== Complete Formula Nippon results ===
(key) (Races in bold indicate pole position) (Races in italics indicate fastest lap)

| Year | Entrant | 1 | 2 | 3 | 4 | 5 | 6 | 7 | 8 | 9 | 10 | 11 | DC | Points |
|---|---|---|---|---|---|---|---|---|---|---|---|---|---|---|
| 2005 | Kondō Racing | MOT | SUZ | SUG | FUJ; 5 | SUZ; 5 | MIN; 2 | FUJ; Ret | MOT; 5 | SUZ; 10 | | | 9th | 12 |
| 2006 | Team Boss INGING | FUJ; 5 | SUZ; Ret | MOT; Ret | SUZ; Ret | AUT; 5 | FUJ; 10 | SUG; 4 | MOT; 9 | SUZ; 12 | | | 10th | 6 |
| 2007 | Team Boss INGING | FUJ; 5 | SUZ; 6 | MOT; 5 | OKA; 1 | SUZ; Ret | FUJ; 7 | SUG; 8 | MOT; 6 | SUZ; 14 | | | 7th | 27 |
| 2008 | Cerumo / INGING | FUJ; 5 | SUZ; 8 | MOT; Ret | OKA; 7 | SUZ; 10 | SUZ; 9 | MOT; Ret | MOT; 13 | FUJ; 6 | FUJ; 3‡ | SUG; 7 | 9th | 21.5 |

^{‡} Half points awarded as less than 75% of race distance was completed.

=== Complete Super GT results ===
(key) (Races in bold indicate pole position) (Races in italics indicate fastest lap)

| Year | Team | Car | Class | 1 | 2 | 3 | 4 | 5 | 6 | 7 | 8 | 9 | DC | Points |
|---|---|---|---|---|---|---|---|---|---|---|---|---|---|---|
| 2005 | SARD | Toyota Supra | GT500 | OKA; 8 | FUJ; Ret | SEP; 9 | SUG; 2 | MOT; 14 | FUJ; 12 | AUT; 11 | SUZ; 11 | | 16th | 21 |
| 2006 | Lexus Team Cerumo | Lexus SC430 | GT500 | SUZ | OKA | FUJ | SEP | SUG | SUZ; 7 | MOT | AUT | FUJ | 24th | 9 |
| 2007 | Lexus Team Kraft | Lexus SC430 | GT500 | SUZ | OKA | FUJ | SEP; 11 | SUG; 9 | SUZ; Ret | MOT | AUT | FUJ | 24th | 2 |
| 2008 | Hasemi Motorsport | Nissan GT-R | GT500 | SUZ; 15 | OKA; 10 | FUJ; 15 | SEP; 9 | SUG; 11 | SUZ; 5 | **MOT**; 1 | AUT; 6 | FUJ; 13 | 12th | 39 |
| 2009 | Hasemi Motorsport | Nissan GT-R | GT500 | OKA; 12 | SUZ; 13 | FUJ; 7 | SEP; 1 | **SUG**; 9 | SUZ; 2 | FUJ; 6 | AUT; 8 | MOT; 12 | 7th | 49 |
| 2010 | Team Impul | Nissan GT-R | GT500 | SUZ; Ret | OKA; 4 | FUJ; 6 | SEP; 1 | SUG; 4 | SUZ; 12 | FUJ; C | MOT; 5 | | 5th | 47 |
| 2011 | MOLA | Nissan GT-R | GT500 | OKA; 6 | FUJ; 10 | SEP; 2 | **SUG**; 1 | SUZ; 2 | FUJ; 7 | AUT; 2 | MOT; 2 | | 1st | 90 |
| 2012 | MOLA | Nissan GT-R | GT500 | OKA; 7 | FUJ; 8 | SEP; 14 | SUG; 3 | **SUZ**; 1 | FUJ; 2 | AUT; 1 | MOT; 2 | | 1st | 93 |
| 2013 | NISMO | Nissan GT-R | GT500 | OKA; 3 | FUJ; Ret | SEP; 9 | SUG; 3 | **SUZ**; 2 | FUJ; 9 | AUT; 8 | MOT; 8 | | 6th | 50 |
| 2014 | NISMO | Nissan GT-R | GT500 | OKA; 7 | FUJ; 8 | **AUT**; 1 | SUG; 14 | FUJ; 2 | SUZ; 2 | BUR; 10 | **MOT**; 1 | | 1st | 81 |
| 2015 | NISMO | Nissan GT-R | GT500 | OKA; 13 | **FUJ**; 1 | CHA; 5 | FUJ; 4 | **SUZ**; 7 | SUG; 6 | AUT; 1 | MOT; 2 | | 1st | 79 |
| 2016 | NISMO | Nissan GT-R | GT500 | OKA; 1 | FUJ; 1 | SUG; 9 | FUJ; 4 | SUZ; 6 | CHA; 14 | MOT; 9 | MOT; 7 | | 3rd | 62 |
| 2017 | NISMO | Nissan GT-R Nismo | GT500 | OKA; 7 | FUJ; 4 | AUT; 5 | SUG; 4 | FUJ; 2 | SUZ; 2 | CHA; 9 | **MOT**; 1 | | 2nd | 82 |
| 2018 | NISMO | Nissan GT-R Nismo | GT500 | OKA; 5 | FUJ; 1 | SUZ; 6 | CHA; 12 | **FUJ**; 9 | SUG; 7 | AUT; 15 | MOT; 7 | | 8th | 43 |
| 2019 | NISMO | Nissan GT-R Nismo | GT500 | **OKA**; 2‡ | **FUJ**; 2 | SUZ; Ret | CHA; 11 | **FUJ**; 3 | AUT; 13 | SUG; 3 | MOT; 8 | | 3rd | 52.5 |
| 2020 | NISMO | Nissan GT-R Nismo | GT500 | FUJ; 11 | FUJ; 9 | SUZ; 1 | MOT; 8 | FUJ; 11 | SUZ; 1 | MOT; 7 | FUJ; 9 | | 6th | 51 |
| 2021 | NISMO | Nissan GT-R Nismo | GT500 | OKA; Ret | FUJ; Ret | MOT; 9 | SUZ; 1 | SUG; 7 | AUT; 3 | MOT; 15 | FUJ; 7 | | 9th | 41 |
| 2022 | NISMO | Nissan Z GT500 | GT500 | OKA; 3 | FUJ; 4‡ | SUZ; 12 | FUJ; 14 | **SUZ**; 5 | SUG; 2 | AUT; 14 | MOT; 13 | | 7th | 37 |
| 2023 | NISMO | Nissan Z GT500 | GT500 | **OKA**; 1 | FUJ; 7 | SUZ; 13 | FUJ; 13 | SUZ; DSQ | SUG; 2 | AUT; 10 | MOT; 2 | | 3rd | 56 |
| 2024 | NISMO | Nissan Z GT500 | GT500 | OKA; 5 | FUJ; 2 | SUZ; 10 | FUJ; 13 | SUG; 12 | AUT; 2 | MOT; 9 | SUZ; 8 | | 8th | 45 |

^{‡} Half points awarded as less than 75% of race distance was completed.

=== All-time Super GT records ===
As of the Super GT – 2020 Takanokono Hotel Fuji GT race:

| Description | Record | Drivers matched |
Championships
| Most Drivers' Championships | 4 | **Sho Tsuboi** |
| Most Drivers' Championships as a non-Japanese driver | 4 | **Stands alone** |
| Most Drivers' Championships won in GT500 class | 4 | **Sho Tsuboi** |
| Most consecutive season with at least 1 podium/season as non-Japanese driver | 16 | **Stands alone** |

Sporting positions
| Preceded by James Courtney | All-Japan Formula 3 Championship; Champion; 2004 | Succeeded by João Paulo de Oliveira |
| Preceded by Takashi Kogure; Loïc Duval | Super GT; GT500 Champion; 2011–2012; With: Masataka Yanagida | Succeeded by Kohei Hirate; Yuji Tachikawa |
| Preceded by Kohei Hirate; Yuji Tachikawa | Super GT; GT500 Champion; 2014–2015; With: Tsugio Matsuda | Succeeded by Kohei Hirate; Heikki Kovalainen |
