= 2009 Keihin Suzuka 2 & 4 =

Layout of the Suzuka International Racing Course

The 2009 Keihin Suzuka 2 & 4 was the second round of the 2009 Super GT season. It took place at Suzuka Circuit on April 18, 2009.

== Race ==
| Pos | No | Team/Car | Drivers | Laps | Time/Retired | Grid | Points |
GT500 Results
| 1 | 38 | ZENT Cerumo SC430 | (Japan) Yuji Tachikawa (United Kingdom) Richard Lyons | 52 | 1:54:52.997 | 2 | 20 |
| 2 | 36 | Petronas TOM'S SC430 | (Japan) Juichi Wakisaka (Germany) André Lotterer | 52 | +1.888 | 4 | 15 |
| 3 | 12 | Impul Calsonic GT-R | (Japan) Tsugio Matsuda (France) Sébastien Philippe | 52 | +5.210 | 5 | 11 |
| 4 | 6 | ENEOS SC430 | (Japan) Daisuke Ito (Sweden) Björn Wirdheim | 52 | +9.585 | 10 | 8 |
| 5 | 18 | Rockstar Dome NSX | (Japan) Ryo Michigame (Japan) Takashi Kogure | 52 | +13.897 | 8 | 6 |
| 6 | 17 | Keihin NSX | (Japan) Toshihiro Kaneishi (Japan) Koudai Tsukakoshi | 52 | +15.354 | 6 | 5 |
| 7 | 35 | Kraft SC430 | (Japan) Hiroaki Ishiura (Japan) Kazuya Oshima | 52 | +17.532 | 11 | 4 |
| 8 | 24 | HIS Advan Kondo GT-R | (Brazil) João Paulo de Oliveira (Japan) Seiji Ara | 52 | +20.330 | 12 | 3 |
| 9 | 32 | Epson NSX | (France) Loïc Duval (Japan) Yuki Nakayama | 52 | +24.063 | 9 | 2 |
| 10 | 39 | Dunlop SARD SC430 | (Portugal) André Couto (Japan) Kohei Hirate | 52 | +25.904 | 14 | 1 |
| 11 | 1 | Motul Autech GT-R | (Japan) Satoshi Motoyama (France) Benoît Tréluyer | 52 | +33.361 | 1 | |
| 12 | 100 | Raybrig NSX | (Japan) Yuji Ide (Japan) Shinya Hosokawa | 51 | +1 Lap | 7 | |
| 13 | 3 | Hasemi Tomica Ebbro GT-R | (Italy) Ronnie Quintarelli (Japan) Hironobu Yasuda | 47 | +5 Laps | 3 | |
| 14 | 8 | ARTA NSX | (Republic of Ireland) Ralph Firman (Japan) Takuya Izawa | 47 | +5 Laps | 13 | |
GT300 Results
| 1 | 33 | Hankook Porsche | (Japan) Mitsuhiro Kinoshita (Japan) Masami Kageyama | 48 | 1:55:31.677 | 1 | 20 |
| 2 | 7 | M7 Mutiara Motors Amemiya SGC7 | (Japan) Nobuteru Taniguchi (Japan) Ryo Orime | 48 | +3.654 | 3 | 15 |
| 3 | 46 | S Road Mola Z | (Japan) Kazuki Hoshino (Japan) Masataka Yanagida | 48 | +7.026 | 5 | 11 |
| 4 | 11 | Jim Gainer Advan F430 | (Japan) Tetsuya Tanaka (Japan) Masayuki Ueda | 48 | +8.922 | 7 | 8 |
| 5 | 43 | ARTA Garaiya | (Japan) Morio Nitta (Japan) Shinichi Takagi | 48 | +13.745 | 6 | 6 |
| 6 | 81 | Daishin Advan Ferrari | (Japan) Takayuki Aoki (Japan) Tomonobu Fujii | 48 | +15.942 | 2 | 5 |
| 7 | 2 | Privée Apple Shiden | (Japan) Kazuho Takahashi (Japan) Hiroki Katoh | 48 | +27.230 | 7 | 4 |
| 8 | 19 | Weds Sport IS350 | (Japan) Manabu Orido (Japan) Tatsuya Kataoka | 48 | +39.276 | 8 | 3 |
| 9 | 74 | Corolla Axio apr GT | (Japan) Takuto Iguchi (Japan) Yuji Kunimoto | 48 | +41.885 | 9 | 2 |
| 10 | 26 | Up Start Taisan Porsche | (Japan) Haruki Kurosawa (Japan) Tsubasa Abe | 48 | +48.512 | 11 | 1 |
| 11 | 31 | Avex apr Corolla Axio | (Japan) Yuya Sakamoto (Japan) Hideki Yamauchi | 48 | +53.590 | 13 | |
| 12 | 5 | Mach Gogogos Yaken 320R | (Japan) Tetsuji Tamanaka (Japan) Akazame Oyaji | 47 | +1 Lap | 14 | |
| 13 | 88 | triple a Gallardo RG-3 | (Japan) Hideshi Matsuda (Japan) Yuya Sakamoto | 47 | +1 Lap | 10 | |
| 14 | 55 | J-Trust F-Pro Outokitto Porsche | (Japan) Yutaka Yamagishi (Japan) Hiroshi Koizumi | 47 | +1 Lap | 15 | |
| 15 | 111 | Ishimatsu with Arktech GT3 | (Japan) Takaya Tsubobayashi (Ukraine) Igor Sushko | 46 | +2 Laps | 16 | |
| 16 | 10 | Jim Gainer Advan F360 | (Japan) Masayuki Ueda (Japan) Masataka Kawaguchi | 46 | +2 Laps | 18 | |
| 17 | 30 | Reckless Kumho IS350 | (Japan) Kouta Sasaki (Japan) Naoya Yamano | 45 | +3 Laps | 12 | |
| 18 | 666 | FieLDS Bomex 320R | (Japan) Shogo Suho (Japan) Junichiro Yamashita | 42 | +6 Laps | 17 | |
| 19 DNF | 66 | triple a Murcié RG-1 | (Japan) Koji Yamanishi (Japan) Atsushi Yogo | 23 | +25 Laps | 21 | |
| 20 DNF | 110 | Kumho "Arktech SG-1" | (Japan) Daisuke Ikeda (South Korea) Kim Han Bong | 10 | +38 Laps | 20 | |
| 21 DNF | 87 | giraffa Gallardo RG-3 | (Japan) Hiroyuki Iiri (Japan) Hisashi Wada | 5 | +43 Laps | 19 | |

Super GT
| Previous race: Okayama 300km | 2009 season | Next race: Fuji 400km |
