= 2009 Okayama GT 300km =

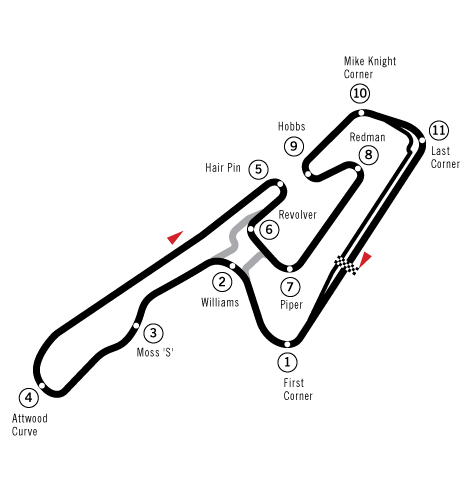
Layout of the Okayama International Circuit

The 2009 Okayama GT 300 km was the first round of the 2009 Super GT season. It took place on March 22, 2009.

== Race ==
Pos	No	Team/Car	Drivers	Laps	Time/Retired	Grid	Points
GT500 Results
1	24	HIS Advan Kondo GT-R	(Brazil) João Paulo de Oliveira (Japan) Seiji Ara	82	2:20:54.071	3	20
2	18	Rockstar Dome NSX	(Japan) Ryo Michigami (Japan) Takashi Kogure	82	+21.645	4	15
3	8	ARTA NSX	(Republic of Ireland) Ralph Firman (Japan) Takuya Izawa	82	+1:06.979	5	11
4	12	Impul Calsonic GT-R	(Japan) Tsugio Matsuda (France) Sébastien Phillipe	82	+1:32.431	10	8
5	17	Keihin NSX	(Japan) Toshihiro Kaneishi (Japan) Koudai Tsukakoshi	81	+1 Lap	7	6
6	38	ZENT Cerumo SC430	(Japan) Yuji Tachikawa (United Kingdom) Richard Lyons	81	+1 Lap	1	5
7	32	Epson NSX	(France) Loïc Duval (Japan) Yuki Nakayama	81	+1 Lap	11	4
8	100	Raybrig NSX	(Japan) Yuji Ide (Japan) Shinya Hosokawa	81	+1 Lap	6	3
9	35	Kraft SC430	(Japan) Hiroaki Ishiura (Japan) Kazuya Oshima	81	+1 Lap	2	2
10	6	ENEOS SC430	(Japan) Daisuke Ito (Sweden) Björn Wirdheim	80	+2 Laps	13	1
11	36	Petronas TOM'S SC430	(Japan) Juichi Wakisaka (Germany) André Lotterer	80	+3 Laps	8	
12	3	Hasemi Tomica Ebbro GT-R	(Italy) Ronnie Quintarelli (Japan) Hironobu Yasuda	79	+3 Laps	12	
13	1	Motul Autech GT-R	(Japan) Satoshi Motoyama (France) Benoît Tréluyer	75	+7 Laps	9	
14	21	Aston Martin Akasaka DBR9	(Japan) Akihiro Tsuzuki (Japan) Takeshi Tsuchiya	74	+8 Laps	14	
15	39	Dunlop SARD SC430	(Portugal) André Couto (Japan) Kohei Hirate	70	+12 Laps	15	
GT300 Results
1	19	Weds Sport IS350	(Japan) Manabu Orido (Japan) Tatsuya Kataoka	77	2:21:11.710	2	20
2	43	ARTA Garaiya	(Japan) Morio Nitta (Japan) Shinichi Takagi	77	+16.205	3	15
3	7	M7 Mutiara Motors Amemiya SGC7	(Japan) Nobuteru Taniguchi (Japan) Ryo Orime	77	+28.012	4	11
4	11	Jim Gainer Advan F430	(Japan) Tetsuya Tanaka (Japan) Masayuki Ueda	77	+1:02.208	1	8
5	74	Corolla Axio apr GT	(Japan) Takuto Iguchi (Japan) Yuji Kunimoto	77	+1:17.576	8	6
6	2	Privée Apple Shiden	(Japan) Kazuho Takahashi (Japan) Hiroki Katoh	77	+1:29.528	5	5
7	46	S Road Mola Z	(Japan) Kazuki Hoshino (Japan) Masataka Yanagida	76	+1 Lap	7	4
8	30	Reckless Kumho IS350	(Japan) Kouta Sasaki (Japan) Naoya Yamano	75	+2 Laps	13	3
9	31	Avex apr Corolla Axio	(Japan) Yuya Sakamoto (Japan) Hideki Yamauchi	75	+2 Laps	14	2
10	26	Up Start Taisan Porsche	(Japan) Haruki Kurosawa (Japan) Tsubasa Abe	74	+3 Laps	11	1
11	87	giraffa Gallardo RG-3	(Japan) Hiroyuki Iiri (Japan) Hisashi Wada	73	+4 Laps	10	
12	81	Daishin Advan Ferrari	(Japan) Takayuki Aoki (Japan) Tomonobu Fujii	73	+4 Laps	6	
13	5	Mach Gogogos Yaken 320R	(Japan) Tetsuji Tamanaka (Japan) Akazame Oyaji	72	+5 Laps	15	
14	55	J-Trust F-Pro Outokitto Porsche	(Japan) Yutaka Yamagishi (Japan) Hiroshi Koizumi	70	+7 Laps	18	
15	808	Hatsune Miku Studie GLAD BMW Z4	(Japan) Yasushi Kikuchi (Japan) Shozo Tagahara	70	+7 Laps	21	
16	666	FieLDS Bomex 320R	(Japan) Shogo Suho (Japan) Junichiro Yamashita	67	+10 Laps	20	
17	111	Ishimatsu with Arktech GT3	(Japan) Takaya Tsubobayashi (Ukraine) Igor Sushko	63	+14 Laps	17	
18	66	triple a Murciélago RG-1	(Japan) Koji Yamanishi (Japan) Atsushi Yogo	61	+16 Laps	12	
19 DNF	110	Sirius Kumho "Arktech SG-1"	(Japan) Daisuke Ikeda (South Korea) Kim Han Bong	46	+31 Laps	19	
20 DNF	88	triple a Gallardo RG-3	(Japan) Hideshi Matsude (Japan) Yuya Sakamoto	22	+55 Laps	9	
DNS	10	Jim Gainer Advan F360	(Japan) Masayuki Ueda (Japan) Masataka Kawaguchi	-		16	

Super GT
Previous race: none	2009 season	Next race: Keihin Suzuka 2 & 4
