= 2009 Super GT Series =

17th season of sports car racing series

The 2009 Autobacs Super GT Series was the seventeenth season of the Japan Automobile Federation Super GT Championship including the All Japan Grand Touring Car Championship (JGTC) era and the fifth season as the Super GT series.

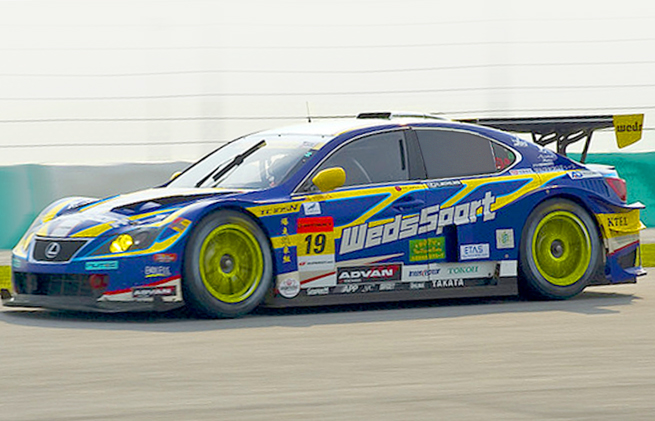
2009 GT300 champions, #19 Racing Project Bandoh Lexus IS 350

It marked as well as the twenty-seventh season of a JAF-sanctioned sports car racing championship dating back to the All Japan Sports Prototype Championship. The season opener on March 22, was moved to Okayama, due to the continued renovation of Suzuka in preparation for the 2009 Japanese Grand Prix. The season finale on November 8 also was moved to Motegi, instead of Fuji. Due to the worldwide economic crisis, race weekends were two days instead of three.

André Lotterer and Juichi Wakisaka claimed the GT500 title in the Petronas TOM'S Lexus SC430. The team also won their respective teams title. Manabu Orido and Tatsuya Kataoka won the GT300 title in the Racing Project Bandoh IS350 by three points from Nobuteru Taniguchi and Ryo Orime.

== Car development ==
=== GT500 class ===
Originally the three makers agreed to unify engine specification to 3.4L V8 engines (the same configuration of Formula Nippon at the time). However, due to the aforementioned economic crisis, Nissan encountered difficulties to develop a suitable engine for their GT-R, and chose to bear a performance ballast while using the same engine as last year. Honda continued to use their mid-engine NSX with performance ballast as the regulations originally planned to mandate front-engine cars. This was also their last year in Super GT with the original NSX, as they announced they would use a new vehicle (the HSV-010) starting in the 2010 season. Honda returned with the NSX in 2014 following the unveiling of the second-generation concept car in 2014, later revised to be based on the production model in 2017; both of which ran midship engine layout until 2019 season.

Team Nova entered the series with a Le Mans spec Aston Martin DBR9. It was the first Aston Martin car to participate the series history (including JGTC), and also the first European and non-Honda/Nissan/Toyota car in GT500 since the 2006 season (a Maserati MC12 did participate the pre-season test in 2006 season but withdraw from the series later). The DBR9 only ran at the first round at Okayama and the two rounds at Fuji, and as of July 2020 is the last non-Japanese car to compete in GT500.

=== GT300 class ===
The apr Racing Team, which had used the Toyota MR-S for a long time decided to discontinue their use of MR-S, and for this season decided to replace it with a mid-engined Toyota Corolla Axio instead.

The Cusco, the only team using an AWD car (Subaru Impreza), left the series as they wanted to concentrate on off-road events. However, Subaru cars were not absent from the series as R&D Sport used a Legacy B4 for round 6, 7 and 9.

Thunder Asia Racing, a team from Singapore, entered round 4 at Sepang with a Mosler MT900R. Their full participation in 2010 season was confirmed after the 2009 season ended.

=== Weight ballast changes ===
In order to combat sandbagging, where a team would intentionally perform poorly in order to secure a more favorable weight handicap, the success ballast formula was changed starting from this season: the ballast would be halved in the penultimate race and lifted altogether in final race for teams that participated in every round of the season. Teams missing only one round receive halved-ballast in the final race instead.

== Drivers and teams ==
=== GT500 ===
Team	Make	Car	Engine	No.	Drivers	Tyre	Rounds
Nismo	Nissan	Nissan GT-R GT500	Nissan VK45DE 4.5 L V8	1	(Japan) Satoshi Motoyama	B	All
Nismo	Nissan	Nissan GT-R GT500	Nissan VK45DE 4.5 L V8	1	(France) Benoît Tréluyer	B	1–5, 7–9
Nismo	Nissan	Nissan GT-R GT500	Nissan VK45DE 4.5 L V8	1	(Germany) Michael Krumm	B	6
Hasemi Motorsport	Nissan	Nissan GT-R GT500	Nissan VK45DE 4.5 L V8	3	(Italy) Ronnie Quintarelli	M	All
Hasemi Motorsport	Nissan	Nissan GT-R GT500	Nissan VK45DE 4.5 L V8	3	(Japan) Hironobu Yasuda	M	All
Lexus Team LeMans ENEOS	Lexus	Lexus SC430 GT500	Lexus RV8 kg 3.4 L V8	6	(Japan) Daisuke Ito	B	All
Lexus Team LeMans ENEOS	Lexus	Lexus SC430 GT500	Lexus RV8 kg 3.4 L V8	6	(Sweden) Björn Wirdheim	B	All
Autobacs Racing Team Aguri	Honda	Honda NSX GT500	Honda C32B 3.4 L V6	8	(Republic of Ireland) Ralph Firman	B	All
Autobacs Racing Team Aguri	Honda	Honda NSX GT500	Honda C32B 3.4 L V6	8	(Japan) Takuya Izawa	B	All
Team Impul	Nissan	Nissan GT-R GT500	Nissan VK45DE 4.5 L V8	12	(Japan) Tsugio Matsuda	B	All
Team Impul	Nissan	Nissan GT-R GT500	Nissan VK45DE 4.5 L V8	12	(France) Sébastien Philippe	B	All
Keihin Real Racing	Honda	Honda NSX GT500	Honda C32B 3.4 L V6	17	(Japan) Toshihiro Kaneishi	B	All
Keihin Real Racing	Honda	Honda NSX GT500	Honda C32B 3.4 L V6	17	(Japan) Koudai Tsukakoshi	B	All
Keihin Real Racing	Honda	Honda NSX GT500	Honda C32B 3.4 L V6	17	(Japan) Katsutomo Kaneishi	B	6
Team Yoshiki and Dome Project	Honda	Honda NSX GT500	Honda C32B 3.4 L V6	18	(Japan) Ryō Michigami	B	All
Team Yoshiki and Dome Project	Honda	Honda NSX GT500	Honda C32B 3.4 L V6	18	(Japan) Takashi Kogure	B	All
Team Nova	Aston Martin	Aston Martin DBR9	Aston Martin AM04 6.0 L V12	21	(Japan) Akihiro Tsuzuki	Y	1, 3, 7
Team Nova	Aston Martin	Aston Martin DBR9	Aston Martin AM04 6.0 L V12	21	(Japan) Takeshi Tsuchiya	Y	1, 3, 7
Kondo Racing	Nissan	Nissan GT-R GT500	Nissan VK45DE 4.5 L V8	24	(Brazil) João Paulo de Oliveira	Y	All
Kondo Racing	Nissan	Nissan GT-R GT500	Nissan VK45DE 4.5 L V8	24	(Japan) Seiji Ara	Y	All
Nakajima Racing	Honda	Honda NSX GT500	Honda C32B 3.4 L V6	32	(France) Loïc Duval	D	All
Nakajima Racing	Honda	Honda NSX GT500	Honda C32B 3.4 L V6	32	(Japan) Yuhki Nakayama	D	All
Lexus Team Kraft	Lexus	Lexus SC430 GT500	Lexus RV8 kg 3.4 L V8	35	(Japan) Hiroaki Ishiura	B	All
Lexus Team Kraft	Lexus	Lexus SC430 GT500	Lexus RV8 kg 3.4 L V8	35	(Japan) Kazuya Oshima	B	All
Lexus Team Petronas TOM'S	Lexus	Lexus SC430 GT500	Lexus RV8 kg 3.4 L V8	36	(Japan) Juichi Wakisaka	B	All
Lexus Team Petronas TOM'S	Lexus	Lexus SC430 GT500	Lexus RV8 kg 3.4 L V8	36	(Germany) André Lotterer	B	All
Lexus Team ZENT Cerumo	Lexus	Lexus SC430 GT500	Lexus RV8 kg 3.4 L V8	38	(Japan) Yuji Tachikawa	B	All
Lexus Team ZENT Cerumo	Lexus	Lexus SC430 GT500	Lexus RV8 kg 3.4 L V8	38	(United Kingdom) Richard Lyons	B	All
Lexus Team SARD	Lexus	Lexus SC430 GT500	Lexus RV8 kg 3.4 L V8	39	(Japan) Kohei Hirate	D	All
Lexus Team SARD	Lexus	Lexus SC430 GT500	Lexus RV8 kg 3.4 L V8	39	(Portugal) André Couto	D	All
Team Kunimitsu	Honda	Honda NSX GT500	Honda C32B 3.4 L V6	100	(Japan) Yuji Ide	B	All
Team Kunimitsu	Honda	Honda NSX GT500	Honda C32B 3.4 L V6	100	(Japan) Shinya Hosokawa	B	1–2, 4–7, 9
Team Kunimitsu	Honda	Honda NSX GT500	Honda C32B 3.4 L V6	100	(Japan) Kosuke Matsuura	B	3, 8

=== GT300 ===
Team	Make	Car	Engine	No.	Drivers	Tyre	Rounds
Cars Tokai Dream28	Mooncraft	Mooncraft Shiden	Toyota 1UZ-FE 4.4 L V8	2	(Japan) Hiroki Katoh	Y	All
Cars Tokai Dream28	Mooncraft	Mooncraft Shiden	Toyota 1UZ-FE 4.4 L V8	2	(Japan) Kazuho Takahashi	Y	1
Cars Tokai Dream28	Mooncraft	Mooncraft Shiden	Toyota 1UZ-FE 4.4 L V8	2	(Japan) Hiroki Yoshimoto	Y	2–9
Avanzza Rosso	Vemac	Vemac RD320R	Honda C32B 3.4 L V6	4	(Japan) Yoshihiro Ito	K	6
Avanzza Rosso	Vemac	Vemac RD320R	Honda C32B 3.4 L V6	4	(Japan) Subaru Yamamoto	K	6
Avanzza Rosso	Vemac	Vemac RD320R	Honda C32B 3.4 L V6	4	(Japan) Michito Uezumi	K	6
Avanzza Rosso	Vemac	Vemac RD320R	Honda C32B 3.4 L V6	4	(Japan) Yoshihiro Ito	Y	9
Avanzza Rosso	Vemac	Vemac RD320R	Honda C32B 3.4 L V6	4	(Ukraine) Igor Sushko	Y	9
Avanzza Rosso	Vemac	Vemac RD320R	Honda C32B 3.4 L V6	666	(Japan) Shogo Suho	Y	All
Avanzza Rosso	Vemac	Vemac RD320R	Honda C32B 3.4 L V6	666	(Japan) Junichiro Yamashita	Y	All
Avanzza Rosso	Vemac	Vemac RD320R	Honda C32B 3.4 L V6	666	(Japan) Takashi Miyamoto	Y	3, 6
Team Mach	Vemac	Vemac RD320R	Porsche M96/77 3.6 L F6	5	(Japan) Tetsuji Tamanaka	Y	All
Team Mach	Vemac	Vemac RD320R	Porsche M96/77 3.6 L F6	5	(Japan) Akazame Oyaji	Y	All
M7 RE Amemiya Racing	Mazda	Mazda RX-7	Mazda RE20B 2.0 L 3-rotor	7	(Japan) Nobuteru Taniguchi	Y	All
M7 RE Amemiya Racing	Mazda	Mazda RX-7	Mazda RE20B 2.0 L 3-rotor	7	(Japan) Ryo Orime	Y	All
Jim Gainer Racing	Ferrari	Ferrari 360	Ferrari F131B 3.6 L V8	10	(Japan) Masayuki Ueda	Y	All
Jim Gainer Racing	Ferrari	Ferrari 360	Ferrari F131B 3.6 L V8	10	(Japan) Masataka Kawaguchi	Y	All
Jim Gainer Racing	Ferrari	Ferrari F430	Ferrari F136E 4.3 L V8	11	(Japan) Tetsuya Tanaka	Y	All
Jim Gainer Racing	Ferrari	Ferrari F430	Ferrari F136E 4.3 L V8	11	(Japan) Katsuyuki Hiranaka	Y	All
Racing Project Bandoh	Lexus	Lexus IS350	Lexus RV8J 3.4 L V8	19	(Japan) Tatsuya Kataoka	Y	All
Racing Project Bandoh	Lexus	Lexus IS350	Lexus RV8J 3.4 L V8	19	(Japan) Manabu Orido	Y	All
Team Taisan	Porsche	Porsche 996 GT3-RS	Porsche M96/77 3.6 L F6	26	(Japan) Haruki Kurosawa	Y	1–4, 6–7, 9
Team Taisan	Porsche	Porsche 996 GT3-RS	Porsche M96/77 3.6 L F6	26	(Japan) Tsubasa Abe	Y	1–3, 5–9
Team Taisan	Porsche	Porsche 996 GT3-RS	Porsche M96/77 3.6 L F6	26	(Japan) Katsuhiko Tsutsui	Y	4, 6, 8
Team Taisan	Porsche	Porsche 996 GT3-RS	Porsche M96/77 3.6 L F6	26	(Japan) Tsubasa Kurosawa	Y	5
Team Takeuchi with Shift	Lexus	Lexus IS350	Lexus RV8J 3.4 L V8	30	(Japan) Kota Sasaki	K	1–3
Team Takeuchi with Shift	Lexus	Lexus IS350	Lexus RV8J 3.4 L V8	30	(Japan) Naoya Yamano	K	1–3
Team Takeuchi with Shift	Lexus	Lexus IS350	Lexus RV8J 3.4 L V8	52	(Japan) Kota Sasaki	K	4–9
Team Takeuchi with Shift	Lexus	Lexus IS350	Lexus RV8J 3.4 L V8	52	(Japan) Naoya Yamano	K	4–6
Team Takeuchi with Shift	Lexus	Lexus IS350	Lexus RV8J 3.4 L V8	52	(Japan) Yuhi Sekiguchi	K	6–9
apr	Toyota	Toyota Corolla Axio apr GT	Toyota 2GR-FSE 3.5 L V6	31	(Japan) Yuya Sakamoto	Y	All
apr	Toyota	Toyota Corolla Axio apr GT	Toyota 2GR-FSE 3.5 L V6	31	(Japan) Hideki Yamauchi	Y	1–4
apr	Toyota	Toyota Corolla Axio apr GT	Toyota 2GR-FSE 3.5 L V6	31	(Japan) Kyosuke Mineo	Y	5–9
apr	Toyota	Toyota Corolla Axio apr GT	Toyota 2GR-FSE 3.5 L V6	31	(Japan) Takamori.com	Y	6
apr	Toyota	Toyota Corolla Axio apr GT	Toyota 2GR-FSE 3.5 L V6	74	(Japan) Takuto Iguchi	M	All
apr	Toyota	Toyota Corolla Axio apr GT	Toyota 2GR-FSE 3.5 L V6	74	(Japan) Yuji Kunimoto	M	All
Hankook KTR	Porsche	Porsche 997 GT3-RSR	Porsche M97/80 3.8 L F6	33	(Japan) Mitsuhiro Kinoshita	H	3, 5, 7
Hankook KTR	Porsche	Porsche 997 GT3-RSR	Porsche M97/80 3.8 L F6	33	(Japan) Masami Kageyama	H	3, 5, 7
Autobacs Racing Team Aguri	ASL	ASL ARTA Garaiya	Nissan VQ35DE 3.5 L V6	43	(Japan) Morio Nitta	M	All
Autobacs Racing Team Aguri	ASL	ASL ARTA Garaiya	Nissan VQ35DE 3.5 L V6	43	(Japan) Shinichi Takagi	M	All
MOLA	Nissan	Nissan Fairlady Z	Nissan VQ35DE 3.5 L V6	46	(Japan) Kazuki Hoshino	Y	All
MOLA	Nissan	Nissan Fairlady Z	Nissan VQ35DE 3.5 L V6	46	(Japan) Masataka Yanagida	Y	All
Tomei Sports	Porsche	Porsche 996 GT3-RSR	Porsche M96/77 3.6 L F6	55	(Japan) Yutaka Yamagishi	Y	1–7, 9
Tomei Sports	Porsche	Porsche 996 GT3-RSR	Porsche M96/77 3.6 L F6	55	(Japan) Hiroshi Koizumi	Y	1–7, 9
R&D Sport	Subaru	Subaru Legacy B4	Subaru EJ20 2.0 L Turbo F4	62	(Japan) Shogo Mitsuyama	Y	6–7, 9
R&D Sport	Subaru	Subaru Legacy B4	Subaru EJ20 2.0 L Turbo F4	62	(Japan) Tetsuya Yamano	Y	6–7, 9
JLOC	Lamborghini	Lamborghini Murcielago RG-1	Lamborghini L535 6.0 L V12	66	(Japan) Koji Yamanishi	Y	All
JLOC	Lamborghini	Lamborghini Murcielago RG-1	Lamborghini L535 6.0 L V12	66	(Japan) Atsushi Yogo	Y	All
JLOC	Lamborghini	Lamborghini Murcielago RG-1	Lamborghini L535 6.0 L V12	66	(Italy) Marco Apicella	Y	3
JLOC	Lamborghini	Lamborghini Gallardo RG-3	Lamborghini 07L1 5.2 L V10	87	(Japan) Hiroyuki Iiri	Y	All
JLOC	Lamborghini	Lamborghini Gallardo RG-3	Lamborghini 07L1 5.2 L V10	87	(Japan) Hisashi Wada	Y	All
JLOC	Lamborghini	Lamborghini Gallardo RG-3	Lamborghini 07L1 5.2 L V10	88	(Japan) Hideshi Matsuda	Y	All
JLOC	Lamborghini	Lamborghini Gallardo RG-3	Lamborghini 07L1 5.2 L V10	88	(Japan) Yuya Sakamoto	Y	All
Thunder Asia Racing	Mosler	Mosler MT900R	GM LS7 7.0 L V8	69	(Singapore) Melvin Choo	Y	4
Thunder Asia Racing	Mosler	Mosler MT900R	GM LS7 7.0 L V8	69	(United Kingdom) Martin Short	Y	4
Team Daishin	Ferrari	Ferrari F430	Ferrari F136E 4.3 L V8	81	(Japan) Takayuki Aoki	Y	All
Team Daishin	Ferrari	Ferrari F430	Ferrari F136E 4.3 L V8	81	(Japan) Tomonobu Fujii	Y	All
Team Daishin	Ferrari	Ferrari F430	Ferrari F136E 4.3 L V8	81	(Japan) Koji Matsuda	Y	6
Arktech Motorsports	Porsche	Porsche Boxster	Porsche M96/77 3.6 L F6	110	(South Korea) Kim Han Bong	K	1–3
Arktech Motorsports	Porsche	Porsche Boxster	Porsche M96/77 3.6 L F6	110	(Japan) Daisuke Ikeda	K	1, 8
Arktech Motorsports	Porsche	Porsche Boxster	Porsche M96/77 3.6 L F6	110	(Japan) Tatsuya Tanigawa	K	2–3, 5, 8
Arktech Motorsports	Porsche	Porsche Boxster	Porsche M96/77 3.6 L F6	110	(Japan) Takashi Ohi	K	5
Arktech Motorsports	Porsche	Porsche 996 GT3-RSR	Porsche M96/73 3.6 L F6	111	(Japan) Takaya Tsubobayashi	K	1–3
Arktech Motorsports	Porsche	Porsche 996 GT3-RSR	Porsche M96/73 3.6 L F6	111	(Ukraine) Igor Sushko	K	1
Arktech Motorsports	Porsche	Porsche 996 GT3-RSR	Porsche M96/73 3.6 L F6	111	(Japan) Daisuke Ikeda	K	2–4
Arktech Motorsports	Porsche	Porsche 996 GT3-RSR	Porsche M96/73 3.6 L F6	111	(Japan) Tojiro Azuma	K	4
Arktech Motorsports	Porsche	Porsche 996 GT3-RSR	Porsche M96/73 3.6 L F6	112	(Japan) Takashi Ohi	K	7, 9
Arktech Motorsports	Porsche	Porsche 996 GT3-RSR	Porsche M96/73 3.6 L F6	112	(Japan) Yoshiaki Nakayama	K	7
Arktech Motorsports	Porsche	Porsche 996 GT3-RSR	Porsche M96/73 3.6 L F6	112	(Japan) Keita Sawa	K	8–9
Arktech Motorsports	Porsche	Porsche 996 GT3-RSR	Porsche M96/73 3.6 L F6	112	(Australia) Aaron Caratti	K	8
Studie GLAD Racing	BMW	BMW Z4M	BMW S62B50 4.9 L V8	808	(Japan) Shozo Tagahara	Y	1–3, 5–9
Studie GLAD Racing	BMW	BMW Z4M	BMW S62B50 4.9 L V8	808	(Japan) Yasushi Kikuchi	Y	1–3, 5–7
Studie GLAD Racing	BMW	BMW Z4M	BMW S62B50 4.9 L V8	808	(Japan) Taku Bamba	Y	6, 8–9

== Schedule ==
Round	Race	Circuit	Date
1	(Japan) Okayama GT 300 km	Okayama International Circuit	March 22
2	(Japan) Suzuka GT 300 km	Suzuka Circuit	April 19
3	(Japan) Fuji GT 400 km	Fuji Speedway	May 4
4	Super GT International Series Malaysia	Sepang International Circuit	June 21
5	(Japan) SUGO GT 300 km	Sportsland SUGO	July 26
6	(Japan) Pokka GT Summer Special	Suzuka Circuit	August 23
7	(Japan) Fuji GT 300 km	Fuji Speedway	September 13
8	(Japan) Autopolis GT 300 km	Autopolis	October 18
9	(Japan) Motegi GT 250 km	Twin Ring Motegi	November 8

As a measure of cost reduction, the two longest race, as well as the final race in the series' distance in the series was shortened in this season. This included the trimming of the traditional 1000km race in Suzuka to 700 km. However, to avoid 1-pit strategy that caused unfairness to some teams, teams were required to pit twice in the Fuji 400 km race.

== Season Winners ==
Rd	Circuit	GT500 Winning Team	GT300 Winning Team	Results
Rd	Circuit	GT500 Winning Drivers	GT300 Winning Drivers	Results
1	Okayama	(Japan) #24 HIS Kondo Racing GT-R	(Japan) #19 WedsSport IS350	Results
1	Okayama	(Brazil) João Paulo de Oliveira (Japan) Seiji Ara	(Japan) Manabu Orido (Japan) Tatsuya Kataoka	Results
2	Suzuka	(Japan) #38 ZENT Cerumo SC430	(Japan) #33 Hankook Porsche	Results
2	Suzuka	(Japan) Yuji Tachikawa (United Kingdom) Richard Lyons	(Japan) Mitsuhiro Kinoshita (Japan) Masami Kageyama	Results
3	Mt. Fuji	(Japan) #1 MOTUL Autech GT-R	(Japan) #43 ARTA Garaiya	Results
3	Mt. Fuji	(Japan) Satoshi Motoyama (France) Benoît Tréluyer	(Japan) Morio Nitta (Japan) Shinichi Takagi	Results
4	Kuala Lumpur	(Japan) #3 Hasemi Tomica Ebbro GT-R	(Japan) #2 I.M Jihan Co.Ltd•Apple Shiden	Results
4	Kuala Lumpur	(Italy) Ronnie Quintarelli (Japan) Hironobu Yasuda	(Japan) Hiroki Katoh (Japan) Hiroki Yoshimoto	Results
5	Sportsland SUGO	(Japan) #1 MOTUL Autech GT-R	(Japan) #33 Hankook Porsche	Results
5	Sportsland SUGO	(Japan) Satoshi Motoyama (France) Benoît Tréluyer	(Japan) Mitsuhiro Kinoshita (Japan) Masami Kageyama	Results
6	Suzuka	(Japan) #35 Kraft SC430	(Japan) #46 S Road Mola Z	Results
6	Suzuka	(Japan) Hiroaki Ishiura (Japan) Kazuya Oshima	(Japan) Kazuki Hoshino (Japan) Masataka Yanagida	Results
7	Mt. Fuji	(Japan) #8 ARTA NSX	(Japan) #81 Daishin Ferrari F430	Results
7	Mt. Fuji	(Republic of Ireland) Ralph Firman (Japan) Takuya Izawa	(Japan) Takayuki Aoki (Japan) Tomonobu Fujii	Results
8	Autopolis	(Japan) #36 Petronas TOM'S SC430	(Japan) #11 Jim Gainer Advan F430	Results
8	Autopolis	(Japan) Juichi Wakisaka (Germany) André Lotterer	(Japan) Tetsuya Tanaka (Japan) Katsuyuki Hiranaka	Results
9	Motegi	(Japan) #8 ARTA NSX	(Japan) #81 Daishin Ferrari F430	Results
9	Motegi	(Republic of Ireland) Ralph Firman (Japan) Takuya Izawa	(Japan) Takayuki Aoki (Japan) Tomonobu Fujii	Results

== Standings ==
=== GT500 Drivers ===
Scoring system

Position	1st	2nd	3rd	4th	5th	6th	7th	8th	9th	10th
Points	20	15	11	8	6	5	4	3	2	1

Rank	Driver	No.	OKA (Japan)	SUZ (Japan)	FUJ (Japan)	SEP (Malaysia)	SUG (Japan)	SUZ (Japan)	FUJ (Japan)	AUT (Japan)	MOT (Japan)	Pts.
1	(Japan) Juichi Wakisaka (Germany) André Lotterer	36	11	2	2	6	7	8	3	1	2	88
2	(Republic of Ireland) Ralph Firman (Japan) Takuya Izawa	8	3	14	3	3	14	12	1	4	1	81
3	(Japan) Satoshi Motoyama	1	13	11	1	8	1	6	2	2	14	78
4	(France) Benoît Tréluyer	1	13	11	1	8	1		2	2	14	73
5	(Japan) Toshihiro Kaneishi (Japan) Koudai Tsukakoshi	17	5	6	12	2	6	10	4	Ret	3	51
6	(Japan) Ryō Michigami (Japan) Takashi Kogure	18	2	5	13	12	3	4	8	5	10	50
7	(Italy) Ronnie Quintarelli (Japan) Hironobu Yasuda	3	12	13	7	1	9	2	6	8	12	49
8	(Brazil) João Paulo de Oliveira (Japan) Seiji Ara	24	1	8	4	5	13	11	13	3	11	48
9	(Japan) Hiroaki Ishiura (Japan) Kazuya Oshima	35	9	7	5	9	12	1	7	7	9	44
10	(Japan) Yuji Tachikawa (United Kingdom) Richard Lyons	38	6	1	9	10	10	3	10	11	13	41
11	(Japan) Tsugio Matsuda (France) Sébastien Philippe	12	4	3	15	7	8	5	15	Ret	7	36
12	(Japan) Daisuke Ito (Sweden) Björn Wirdheim	6	10	4	6	14	5	Ret	5	10	4	35
13	(Japan) Yuji Ide	100	8	12	11	4	4	9	12	6	8	29
14	(Portugal) André Couto (Japan) Kohei Hirate	39	15	10	10	13	2	7	11	12	5	27
15	(Japan) Shinya Hosokawa	100	8	12		4	4	9	12		8	24
16	(France) Loïc Duval (Japan) Yuhki Nakayama	32	7	9	8	11	11	Ret	9	9	6	18
17	(Japan) Kosuke Matsuura	100			11					6		5
18	(Germany) Michael Krumm	1						6				5
19	(Japan) Katsutomo Kaneishi	17						10				1
-	(Japan) Akihiro Tsuzuki (Japan) Takeshi Tsuchiya	21	14		14				14			0
Rank	Driver	No.	OKA (Japan)	SUZ (Japan)	FUJ (Japan)	SEP (Malaysia)	SUG (Japan)	SUZ (Japan)	FUJ (Japan)	AUT (Japan)	MOT (Japan)	Pts.

Colour	Result
Gold	Winner
Silver	Second place
Bronze	Third place
Green	Points classification
Blue	Non-points classification
Blue	Non-classified finish (NC)
Purple	Retired, not classified (Ret)
Red	Did not qualify (DNQ)
Red	Did not pre-qualify (DNPQ)
Black	Disqualified (DSQ)
White	Did not start (DNS)
White	Withdrew (WD)
White	Race cancelled (C)
Blank	Did not practice (DNP)
Blank	Did not arrive (DNA)
Blank	Excluded (EX)

==== Teams' standings ====
Rank	Team	No.	OKA (Japan)	SUZ (Japan)	FUJ (Japan)	SEP (Malaysia)	SUG (Japan)	SUZ (Japan)	FUJ (Japan)	AUT (Japan)	MOT (Japan)	Pts.
1	Lexus Team Petronas TOM'S	36	11	2	2	6	7	8	3	1	2	112
2	Autobacs Racing Team Aguri	8	3	14	3	3	14	12	1	4	1	102
3	Nismo	1	13	11	1	8	1	6	2	2	14	101
4	Team Yoshiki & Dome Project	18	2	5	13	12	3	4	8	5	10	75
5	KEIHIN Real Racing	17	5	6	12	2	6	10	4	Ret	3	72
6	Hasemi Motorsport	3	12	13	7	1	9	2	6	8	12	71
7	Kondo Racing	24	1	8	4	5	13	11	13	3	11	69
8	Lexus Team Kraft	35	9	7	5	9	12	1	7	7	9	68
9	Lexus Team ZENT Cerumo	38	6	1	9	10	10	3	10	11	13	63
10	Team Impul	12	4	3	15	7	8	5	15	Ret	7	55
11	Lexus Team LeMans ENEOS	6	10	4	6	14	5	Ret	5	10	4	54
12	Team Kunimitsu	100	8	12	11	4	4	9	12	6	8	52
13	Lexus Team SARD	39	15	10	10	13	2	7	11	12	5	48
14	Nakajima Racing	32	7	9	8	11	11	Ret	9	9	6	39
15	Team Nova	21	14		14				14			3
Rank	Team	No.	OKA (Japan)	SUZ (Japan)	FUJ (Japan)	SEP (Malaysia)	SUG (Japan)	SUZ (Japan)	FUJ (Japan)	AUT (Japan)	MOT (Japan)	Pts.

=== GT300 Drivers ===
Scoring system

Position	1st	2nd	3rd	4th	5th	6th	7th	8th	9th	10th
Points	20	15	11	8	6	5	4	3	2	1

Rank	Driver	No.	OKA (Japan)	SUZ (Japan)	FUJ (Japan)	SEP (Malaysia)	SUG (Japan)	SUZ (Japan)	FUJ (Japan)	AUT (Japan)	MOT (Japan)	Pts.
1	(Japan) Manabu Orido (Japan) Tatsuya Kataoka	19	1	8	5	2	5	6	4	3	3	85
2	(Japan) Nobuteru Taniguchi (Japan) Ryo Orime	7	3	2	3	3	11	7	DNS	2	2	82
3	(Japan) Tetsuya Tanaka (Japan) Katsuyuki Hiranaka	11	4	4	Ret	8	3	5	2	1	4	79
4	(Japan) Takayuki Aoki (Japan) Tomonobu Fujii	81	12	6	2	DNS	4	8	1	18	1	71
5	(Japan) Morio Nitta (Japan) Shinichi Takagi	43	2	5	1	10	9	2	7	4	14	71
6	(Japan) Hiroki Katoh	2	6	7	9	1	2	3	5	16	16	63
7	(Japan) Kazuki Hoshino (Japan) Masataka Yanagida	46	7	3	6	4	6	1	9	8	7	62
8	(Japan) Hiroki Yoshimoto	2		7	9	1	2	3	5	16	16	58
9	(Japan) Mitsuhiro Kinoshita (Japan) Masami Kageyama	33		1			1		6			45
10	(Japan) Takuto Iguchi (Japan) Yuji Kunimoto	74	5	9	8	16	8	4	12	7	5	32
11	(Japan) Yuya Sakamoto	31	9	11	7	6	10	18	15	5	6	23
12	(Japan) Koji Yamanishi (Japan) Atsushi Yogo	66	18	Ret	18	5	13	17	3	11	8	20
13	(Japan) Tsubasa Abe	26	10	10	4		7	16	14	9	9	18
14	(Japan) Haruki Kurosawa	26	10	10	4	Ret		16	14		9	12
15	(Japan) Kyosuke Mineo	31					10	18	15	5	6	12
16	(Japan) Hideki Yamauchi	31	9	11	7	6						11
17	(Japan) Kota Sasaki	30/52	8	17	11	7	15	9	13	13	10	10
18	(Japan) Tetsuji Tamanaka (Japan) Akazame Oyaji	5	13	12	10	12	16	Ret	8	6	15	9
19	(Japan) Naoya Yamano	30/52	8	17	11	7	15	9				9
20	(Japan) Kazuho Takahashi	2	6									5
21	(Japan) Tsubasa Kurosawa	26					7					4
22	(Japan) Yuhi Sekiguchi	52						9	13	13	10	3
23	(Japan) Masayuki Ueda (Japan) Masataka Kawaguchi	10	DNS	16	15	9	20	15	17	19	13	2
24	(Japan) Katsuhiko Tsutsui	26				Ret		16		9		2
25	(Japan) Hideshi Matsuda (Japan) Yuya Sakamoto	88	Ret	13	19	Ret	12	10	10	12	11	2
26	(Japan) Shozo Tagahara	808	15	DNQ	17		17	Ret	Ret	10	Ret	1
27	(Japan) Taku Bamba	808						Ret		10	Ret	1
-	(Japan) Koji Aoyama	81						8				0
-	(Japan) Hiroyuki Iiri (Japan) Hisashi Wada	87	11	Ret	Ret	15	Ret	12	11	17	Ret	0
-	(Japan) Daisuke Ikeda	110/111	Ret	15	13	11						0
-	(Japan) Tojiro Azuma	111				11						0
-	(Japan) Yutaka Yamagishi (Japan) Hiroshi Koizumi	55	14	14	12		14	11	19		Ret	0
-	(Japan) Keita Sawa	112								14	12	0
-	(Japan) Takashi Ohi	110/112					18		Ret		12	0
-	(Japan) Takaya Tsubobayashi	111	17	15	13							0
-	(Singapore) Melvin Choo (United Kingdom) Martin Short	69				13						0
-	(Japan) Shogo Suho (Japan) Junichiro Yamashita	666	16	18	16	14	Ret	13	16	15	Ret	0
-	(Japan) Takashi Miyamoto	666			16			13				0
-	(Japan) Tatsuya Tanigawa	110		Ret	13		18					0
-	(South Korea) Kim Han Bong	110	Ret	Ret	14							0
-	(Japan) Yoshihiro Ito	4						14			Ret	0
-	(Japan) Michito Uezumi (Japan) Subaru Yamamoto	4						14				0
-	(Australia) Aaron Caratti	112								14		0
-	(Japan) Yasushi Kikuchi	808	15		17		17	Ret	Ret			0
-	(Ukraine) Igor Sushko	111/4	17								Ret	0
-	(Italy) Marco Apicella	66			18							0
-	(Japan) Hiroshi Takamori	31						18				0
-	(Japan) Shogo Mitsuyama (Japan) Tetsuya Yamano	62						WD	18		Ret	0
-	(Japan) Yoshiaki Nakayama	112							Ret			0
Rank	Driver	No.	OKA (Japan)	SUZ (Japan)	FUJ (Japan)	SEP (Malaysia)	SUG (Japan)	SUZ (Japan)	FUJ (Japan)	AUT (Japan)	MOT (Japan)	Pts.

Colour	Result
Gold	Winner
Silver	Second place
Bronze	Third place
Green	Points classification
Blue	Non-points classification
Blue	Non-classified finish (NC)
Purple	Retired, not classified (Ret)
Red	Did not qualify (DNQ)
Red	Did not pre-qualify (DNPQ)
Black	Disqualified (DSQ)
White	Did not start (DNS)
White	Withdrew (WD)
White	Race cancelled (C)
Blank	Did not practice (DNP)
Blank	Did not arrive (DNA)
Blank	Excluded (EX)

==== GT300 Teams' standings ====
Rank	Team	No.	OKA (Japan)	SUZ (Japan)	FUJ (Japan)	SEP (Malaysia)	SUG (Japan)	SUZ (Japan)	FUJ (Japan)	AUT (Japan)	MOT (Japan)	Pts.
1	Racing Project Bandoh	19	1	8	5	2	5	6	4	3	3	112
2	M7 RE Amemiya Racing	7	3	2	3	3	11	7	DNS	2	2	106
3	Jim Gainer	11	4	4	Ret	8	3	5	2	1	4	103
4	Autobacs Racing Team Aguri	43	2	5	1	10	9	2	7	4	14	96
5	Team Daishin	81	12	6	2	DNS	4	8	1	18	1	91
6	Team Nishizawa MOLA	46	7	3	6	4	6	1	9	8	7	89
7	Cars Tokai Dream28	2	6	7	9	1	2	3	5	16	16	84
8	apr	74	5	9	8	16	8	4	12	7	5	57
9	Hankook KTR	33		1			1		6			54
10	apr	31	9	11	7	6	10	18	15	5	6	46
11	Team Taisan	26	10	10	4	Ret	7	16	14	9	9	38
12	JLOC	66	18	Ret	18	5	13	17	3	11	8	36
13	Team Takeuchi with Shift	30/52	8	17	11	7	15	9	13	13	10	27
14	Team Mach	5	13	12	10	12	16	Ret	8	6	15	23
15	JLOC	88	Ret	13	19	Ret	12	10	10	12	11	19
16	Jim Gainer	10	DNS	16	15	9	20	15	17	19	13	14
17	JLOC	87	11	Ret	Ret	15	Ret	12	11	17	Ret	8
18	Tomei Sports	55	14	14	12		14	11	19		Ret	8
19	Avanzza Rosso	666	16	18	16	14	Ret	13	16	15	Ret	8
20	Studie GLAD Racing	808	15	DNQ	17		17	Ret	Ret	10	Ret	5
21	Arktech Motorsports	112							Ret	14	12	4
22	Arktech Motorsports	111	17	15	13	11						4
23	Arktech Motorsports	110	Ret	Ret	14							2
24	Avanzza Rosso	4						14			Ret	1
25	R&D Sport	62						WD	18		Ret	1
-	Thunder Asia Racing	69				13						0
Rank	Team	No.	OKA (Japan)	SUZ (Japan)	FUJ (Japan)	SEP (Malaysia)	SUG (Japan)	SUZ (Japan)	FUJ (Japan)	AUT (Japan)	MOT (Japan)	Pts.
