= Honda NSX =

Two-seater sports car manufactured by Honda and branded in the US as Acura

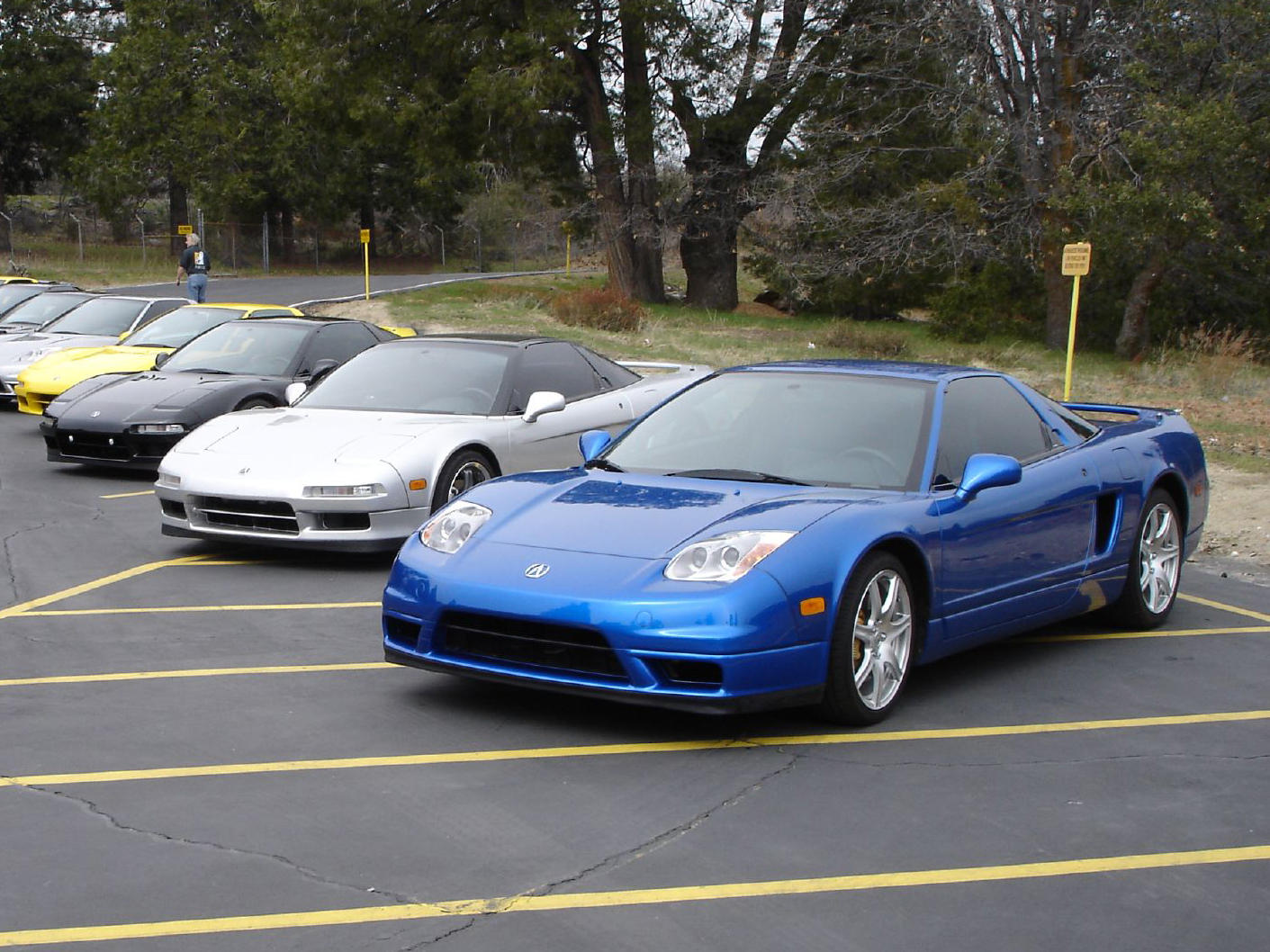
- Multiple first-generation Acura NSX cars (post-facelift model in blue)

Overview
- Manufacturer: Honda
- Also called: Acura NSX (North America/Hong Kong)
- Production: 1990–2005 (NA1/2); 2016–2022 (NC1/2)
- Model years: 1991–2005; 2017–2022

Body and chassis
- Class: Sports car (S)

The Honda NSX (sold as the Acura NSX in North America and Hong Kong) is a two-seater sports car manufactured by Honda over two generations. The first generation was produced from 1990 until 2005, whilst the second generation was made from 2016 to 2022. The first generation was introduced as a two-door coupé, with a two-door targa top variant later added, and has a rear mid-engine, rear-wheel-drive layout. The second generation is only a coupé, and has a rear mid-engine, all-wheel-drive layout. The first generation has a transversely-mounted naturally-aspirated engine with a V6 configuration, whilst the second generation has a twin-turbocharged V6 engine supplemented by multiple electric motors in a petrol-electric hybrid drivetrain.

The origins of the Honda NSX can be traced back to 1984, with the HP-X (Honda Pininfarina eXperimental) concept, for a 3.0 L (180 cu in) V6 rear mid-engine, rear-wheel drive sports car. Honda, with the intention of meeting or exceeding the performance of the then V8 engine Ferrari range, committed to the project, aiming at both reliability and a lower price. The concept evolved and had its name changed to NS-X, which stood for "New", "Sports car" "eXperimental".

== First generation (NA1/2; 1990–2005) ==
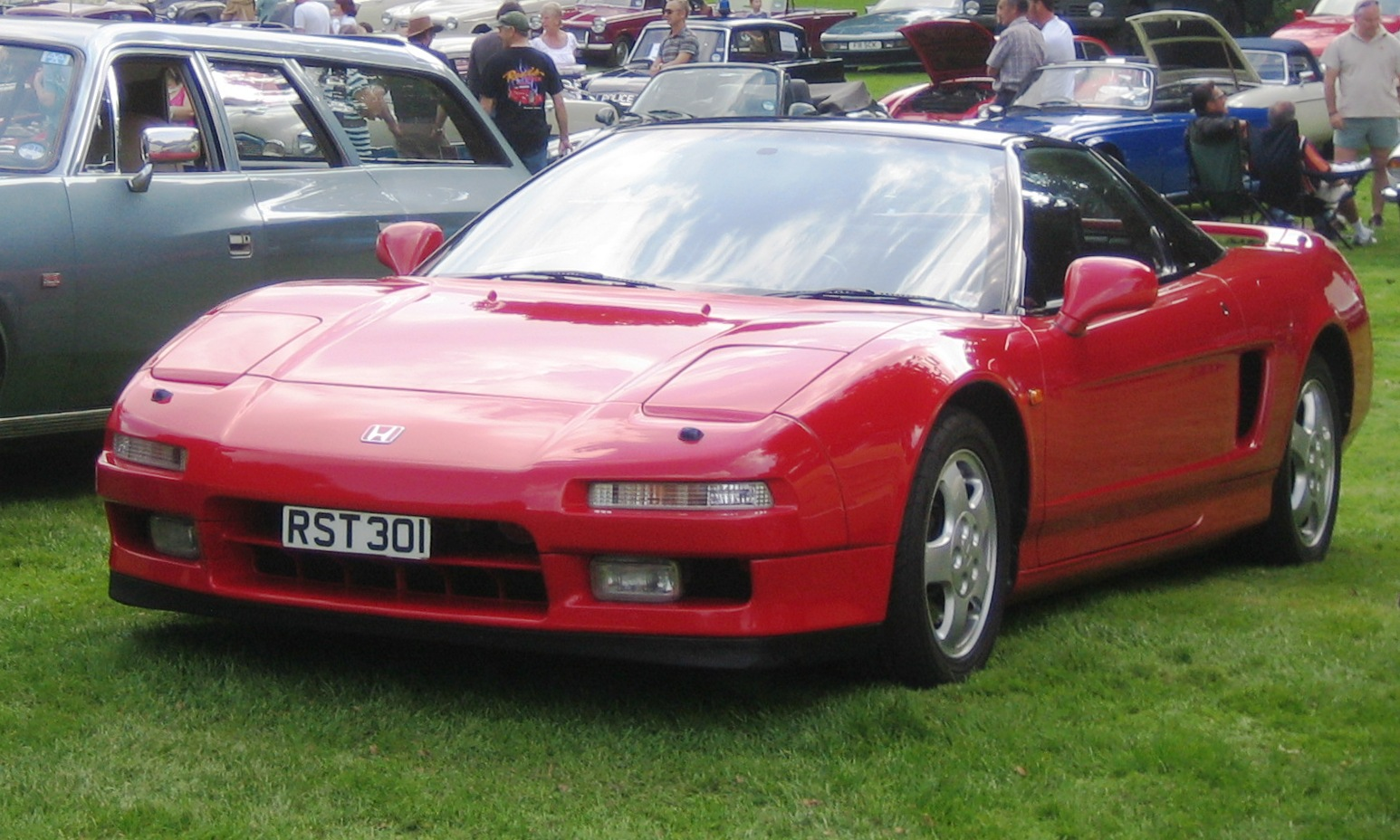
Honda NSX, pre-facelift

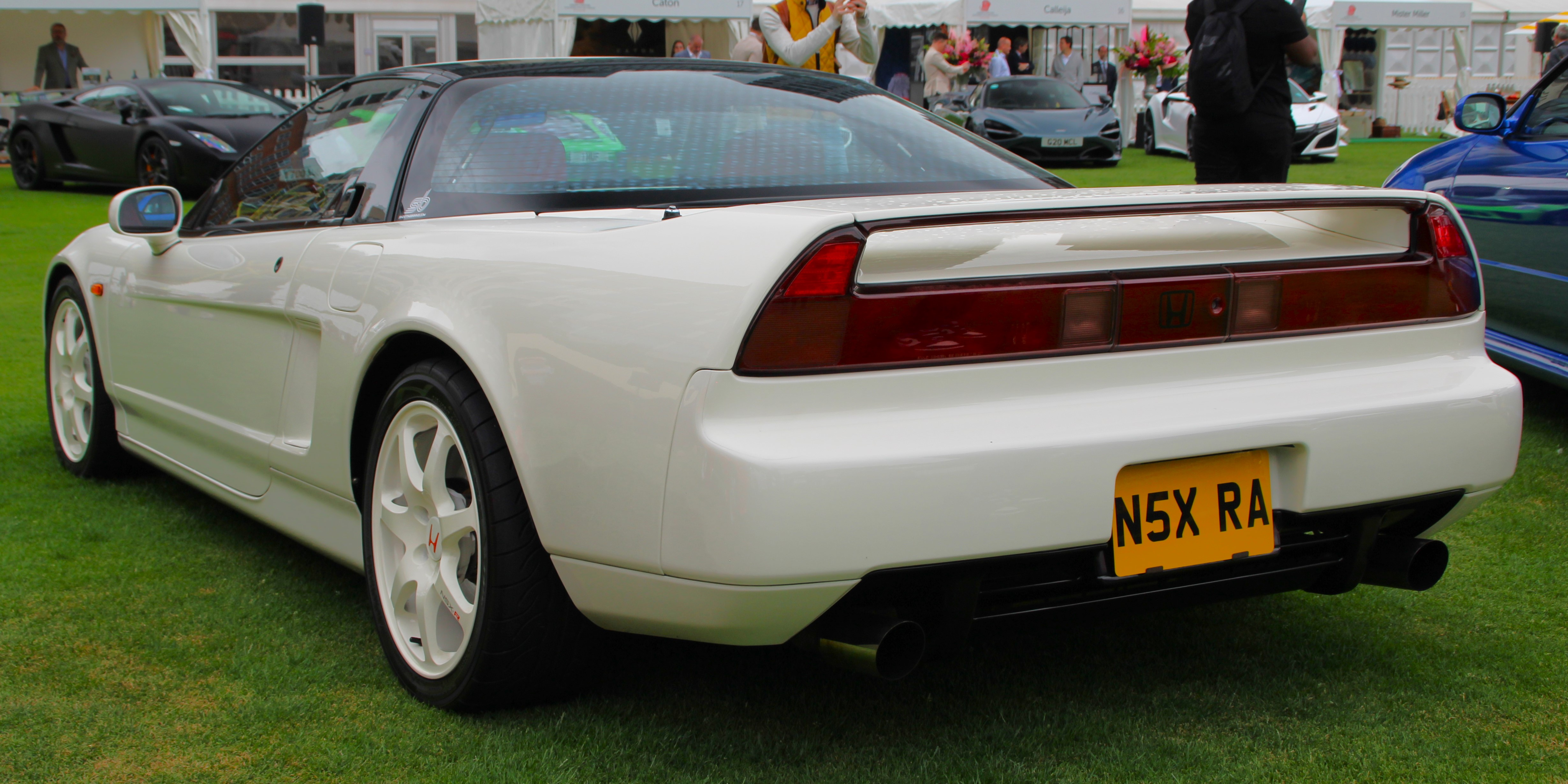
Rear view of Honda NSX Type R (UK)

The NSX was designed by a team led by Chief Designer Masahito Nakano and Executive Chief Engineer Shigeru Uehara. It benefited from advanced aerodynamics and styling inspired by the F-16 fighter jet cockpit as well as input, during the final development stages, from Formula One World Champion Ayrton Senna drove this car.

The NSX was the first general production car to feature an all-aluminium semi-monocoque. It was powered by an all-aluminium 3.0 L V6 engine, which featured Honda's VTEC (Variable Valve Timing and Lift Electronic Control) system developed in the 1980s, a 5-speed manual transmission, or starting in 1994 the SportShift 4-speed automatic transmission, also known as F-Matic, which allows the option of conventional automatic shifting or manually shifting with a fingertip shift lever on the steering column.

The car was presented at the 1989 Chicago Auto Show. Production started in a purpose-made factory in Japan, for sale from 1990. It was originally available as a coupé, then, from 1995 onwards, as a targa top, and also included variable electric power-assisted steering system for all drivetrains. It underwent a performance update in 1997, which saw the arrival of a larger 3.2 L V6 engine, and a facelift in 2002 where the pop-up headlights were replaced with fixed headlights. The first-generation NSX was discontinued in December 2005. Fewer than 20,000 were made; this scarcity makes used ones relatively expensive.

The NA1 code indicates an NSX fitted with the original Honda C30A 3.0-liter V6, whereas the NA2 means it is equipped with the newer C32B 3.2-liter engine. For instance, while the manual-transmission NSX was only available with the C32B after 1996, automatic models retained the original C30A throughout the entire generation, making these models NA1s. Consequently, both the pre-facelift and the post-facelift models can be coded NA1 or an NA2 depending on the engine installed.

== Second generation (NC1/2; 2016–2022) ==
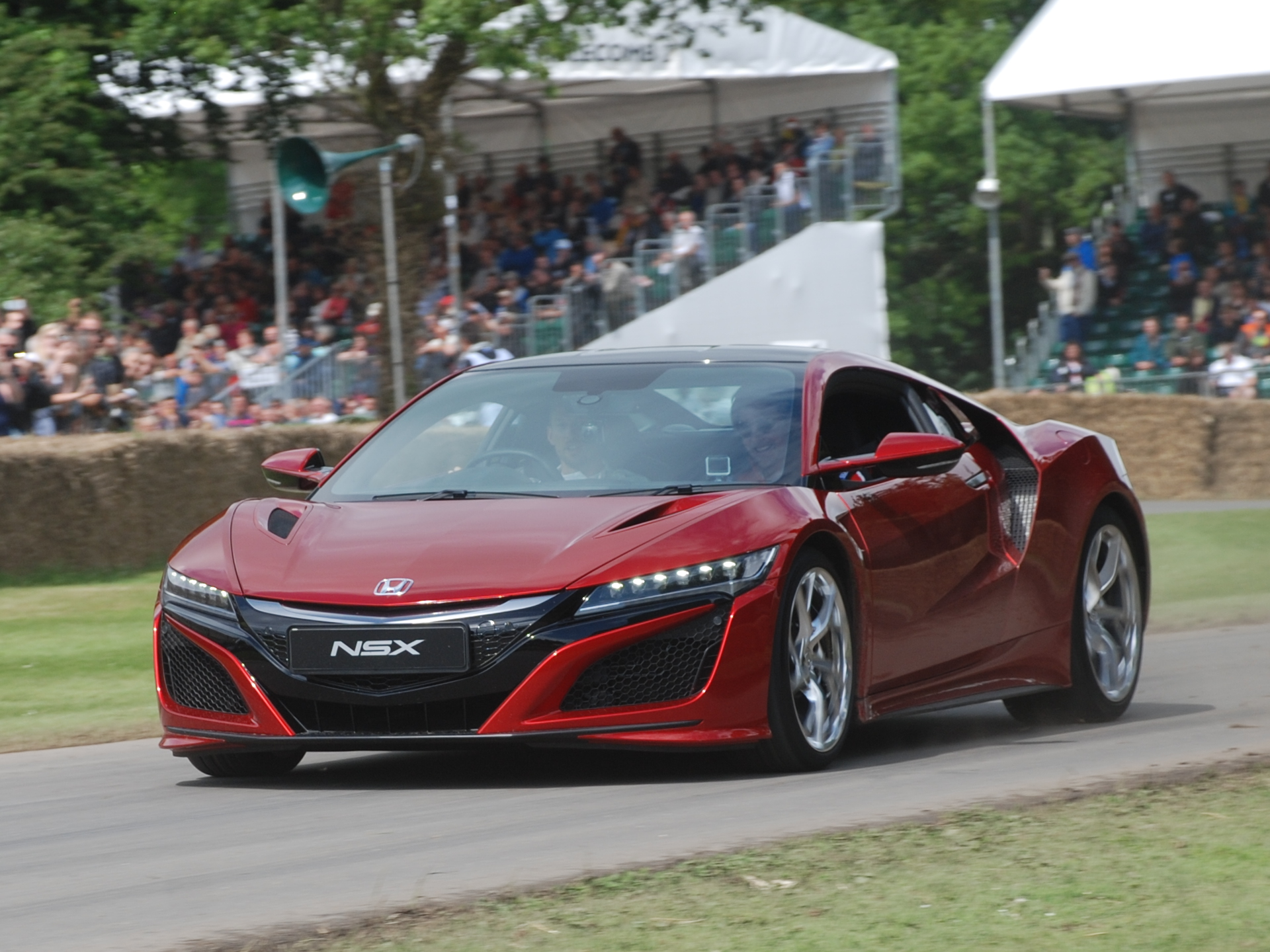
Honda NSX

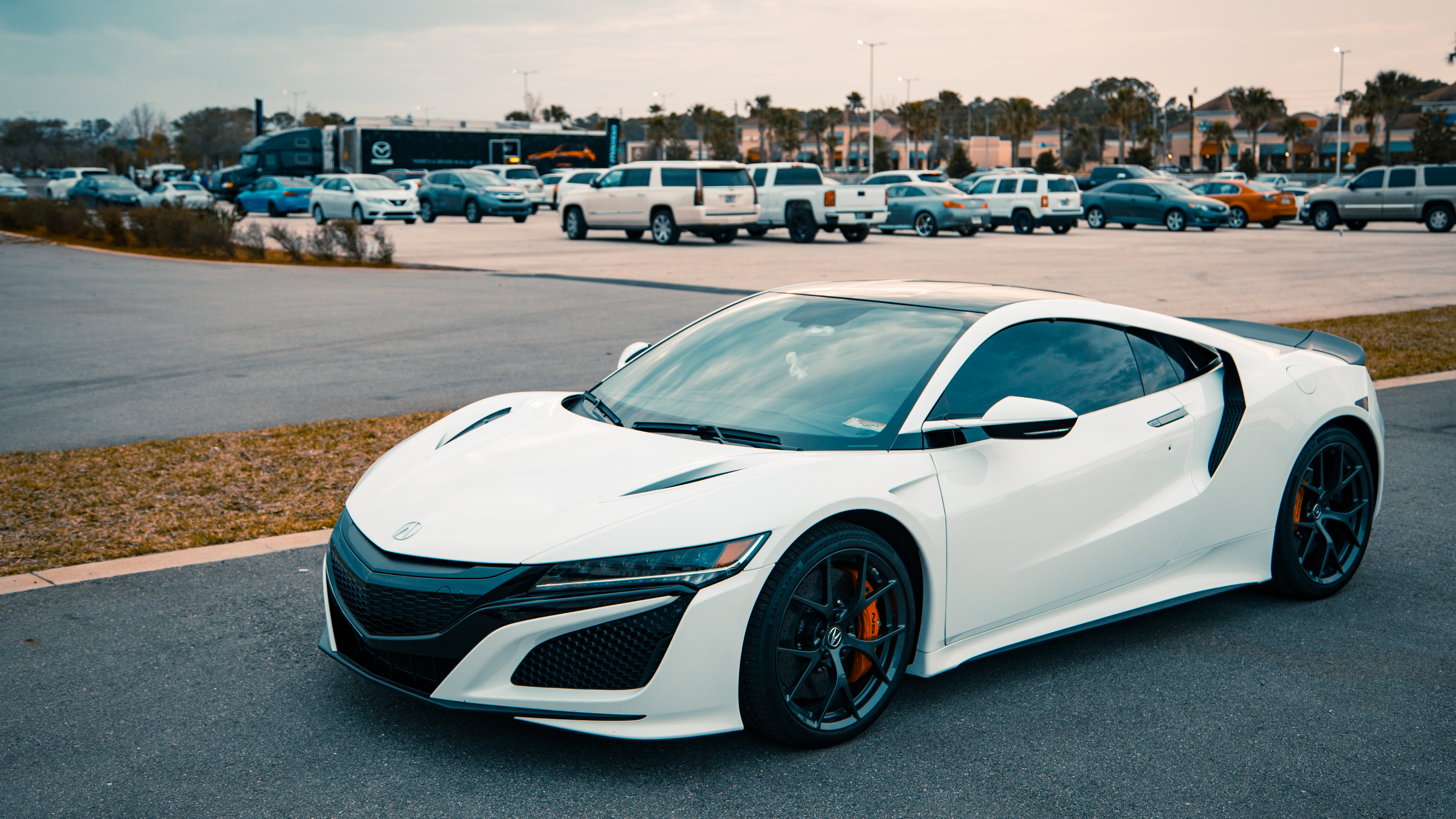
Acura NSX

In December 2007, Acura announced plans to launch a NSX successor by 2010, based on the styling of the front V10-engined Acura ASCC (Advanced Sports Car Concept). Despite prototypes being tested for production, Honda announced, just one year later, that production plans had been canceled due to "poor economic conditions." Instead, in March 2010, Honda unveiled the HSV-010 GT that participated in the Japanese Super GT Championship. However, the HSV-010 GT never reached production as a street-legal car.

Reports that Honda was again developing a successor to the NSX re-emerged in April 2011. By December 2011, Honda officially announced a second-generation NSX concept, which was unveiled the following month at the 2012 North American International Auto Show as the Acura NSX Concept.

The production model was displayed three years later at the 2015 North American International Auto Show, for and was released for sale in 2016.

Although the original name was retained, this time it was defined as "New Sports eXperience". Unlike the first-generation NSX which was manufactured in Japan, the second-generation NSX was designed, engineered and assembled in Marysville, Ohio, at Honda's plant, led by Chief Engineer Ted Klaus.

The second-generation NSX has a hybrid electric powertrain, with a 3.5 L twin-turbocharged V6 engine and three electric motors, two of which form part of the SH-AWD (Super Handling-All Wheel Drive) drivetrain, altogether capable of 573 hp (427 kW; 581 PS). The transmission is a 9-speed dual-clutch automatic. The car's body utilizes a space frame design, which is made from aluminium, ultra-high-strength steel, and other rigid and lightweight materials, some of which are the world's first applications. Unlike the first-generation NSX, this did not feature VTEC.

The first production vehicle with VIN #001 was auctioned off by Barrett Jackson on 29 January 2016. NASCAR team owner Rick Hendrick won the auction with a bid for US$1,200,000. The entire bid was donated to the charities Pediatric Brain Tumor Foundation and Camp Southern Ground.

The first NSX rolled off the production line in Ohio on 27 May 2016 and Hendrick was there to drive it off. The first sales of the second-generation NSX in the US were registered in June 2016.

The NSX Type S was revealed on August 12, 2021, with a power increase to 602 hp (449 kW). The Type S is the last update before the NSX was discontinued in November 2022. 300 units only of the NSX Type S were destined for the United States, with 30 units for Japan, and 15 units for Canada.

== Acura NSX Roadster ==
NSX Roadster

A custom modified version of the NSX designed by Dave Marek, appeared in the Marvel Studios blockbuster-movie The Avengers as the personal vehicle of fictional character Tony Stark (Robert Downey Jr.). In October 2026, Acura announced a charitable online auction for the vehicle via bidding website Cars & Bids.
