= Lexus SC =

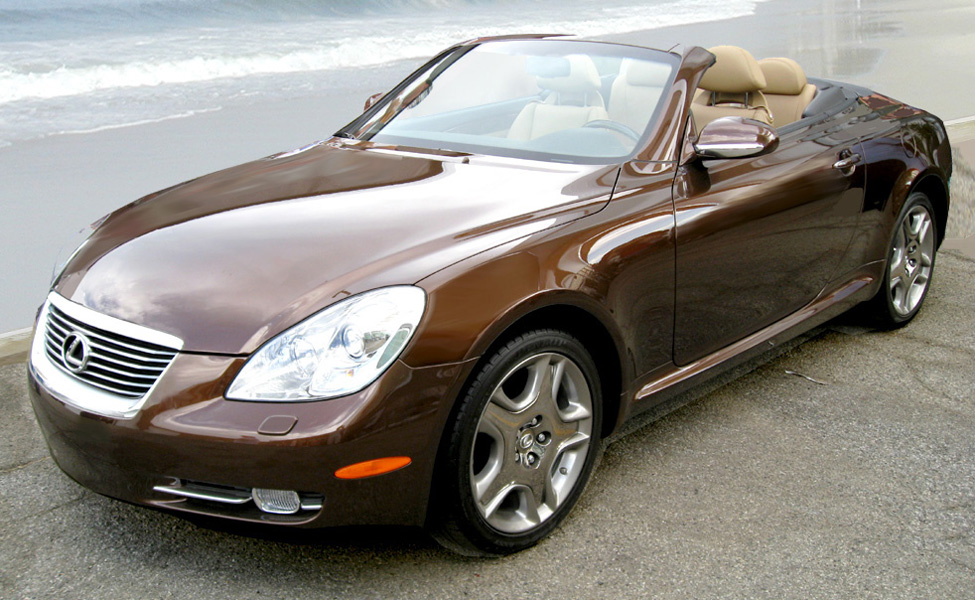
- 2008 Lexus SC 430

Overview
- Manufacturer: Toyota
- Also called: Toyota Soarer (Japan, 1991–2005)
- Production: April 1991–2010
- Model years: 1992–2010

Body and chassis
- Class: Grand tourer; Personal luxury car
- Layout: Front-engine, rear-wheel-drive

Chronology
- Predecessor: Toyota Soarer (Z20)
- Successor: Lexus LC

The Lexus SC (Japanese: レクサス・SC, Rekusasu SC) is a two-door four passenger, front-engine, rear-drive grand touring coupe manufactured by Toyota and marketed by its luxury division, Lexus, for model years 1991–2010 across two generations. The first-generation SC debuted as the V8-powered SC 400 in 1991, and the I6-powered SC 300 was added in 1992, both manufactured until 2000. The second-generation model, the SC 430, went into production in 2001, as a retractable hardtop convertible coupe with a V8 engine. The first-generation SC was largely styled in California at Calty, and the second-generation SC was mainly conceived at design studios in Europe.

In Japan, the related third-generation Toyota Soarer, with which the first-generation SC originally shared body design and multiple components, featured a separate line-up of vehicle configurations and different powertrains. The third generation Soarer sport coupe, largely identical to the SC 430, was superseded by its Lexus counterpart in Japan when the Lexus marque débuted there in 2005. The SC was the sole coupé in the Lexus lineup until the arrival of the IS C. According to Lexus, the SC designation stands for Sport Coupe. The LC replaced the SC lineup in 2017.

== First generation (Z30; 1991) ==
First generation (Z30)
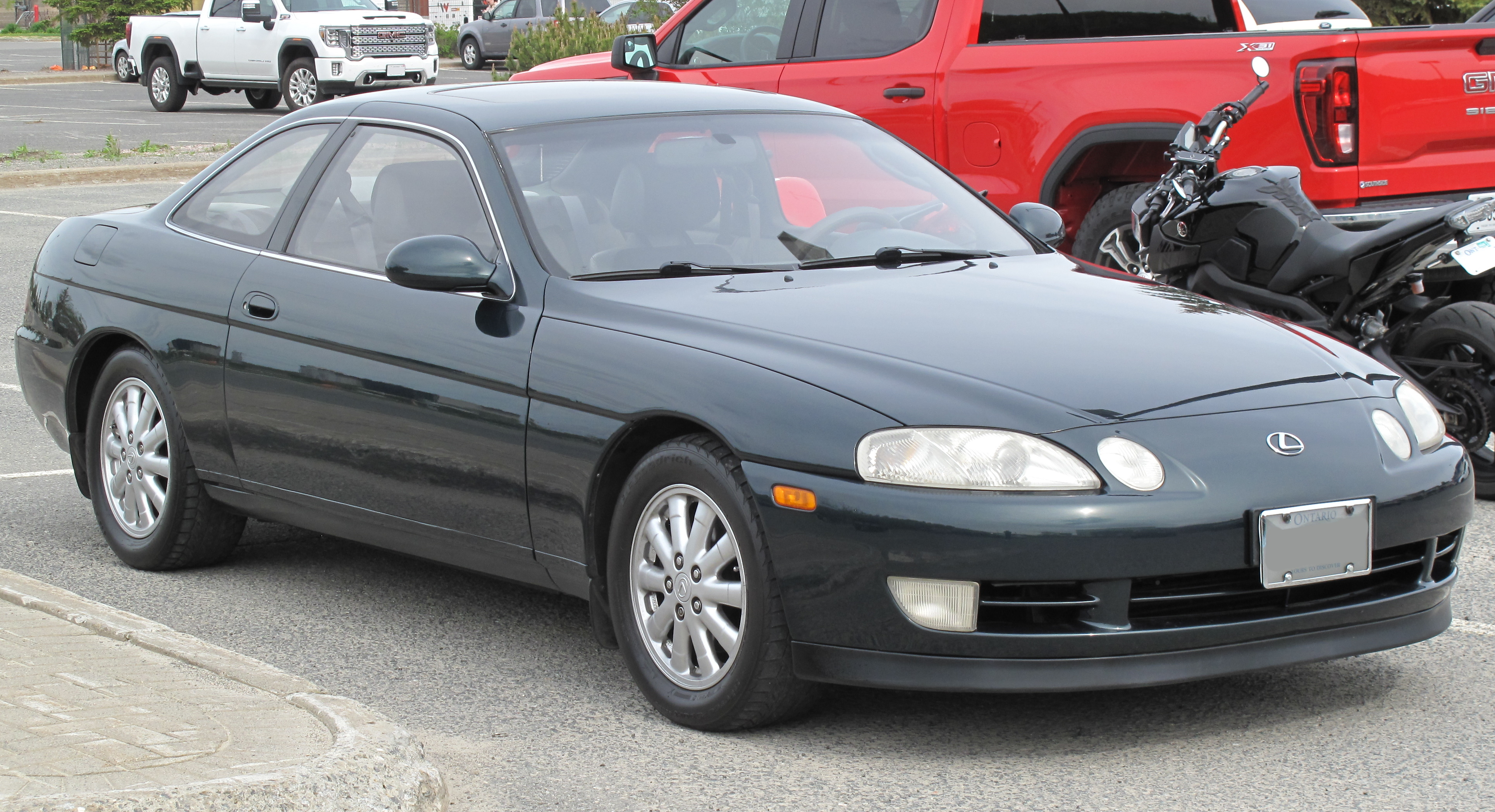
- 1992 Lexus SC 400

Overview
- Also called: Toyota Soarer
- Production: 21 April 1991 – 7 July 2000
- Model years: 1992–2000
- Assembly: Japan: Susono, Shizuoka (Higashi Fuji plant); Japan: Toyota, Aichi (Motomachi plant)
- Designer: Erwin Lui and Dennis Campbell (1988–1989)

Body and chassis
- Body style: 2-door coupé
- Related: Toyota Supra (A80)

Powertrain
- Engine: 3.0 L 2JZ-GE I6 (SC 300); 4.0 L 1UZ-FE V8 (SC 400)
- Transmission: 4-speed A340E (1992–00 SC 300, 1992–97 SC 400) / A341E (1992-99 SC 400 GT-L) automatic; 5-speed A650E automatic (1998–00 SC 400); 5-speed W58 manual (1992–97 SC 300)

Dimensions
- Wheelbase: 105.9 in (2,690 mm)
- Length: 191.3 in (4,859 mm) (1992–97); 192.5 in (4,890 mm) (1998–00)
- Width: 70.5 in (1,791 mm) (1992–97); 70.9 in (1,801 mm) (1998–00)
- Height: 52.4 in (1,331 mm) (1992–94 SC 300); 52.6 in (1,336 mm) (1995–97 SC 300 & 1992–97 SC 400); 53.2 in (1,351 mm) (1998–00 SC 300/400)
- Curb weight: 3,485 lb (1,581 kg) (1992 SC 300 manual); 3,505 lb (1,590 kg) (1992 SC 300 automatic); 3,604 lb (1,635 kg) (1992 SC 400)

=== 1991–2000 ===
In the early 1990s, following the début of Lexus, automotive press reports indicated a forthcoming Full-size Lexus coupé to compete with other luxury GT coupés of other marques, including the Mercedes-Benz CL, Acura Legend coupe and later the Acura CL, Eunos Cosmo, Buick Riviera, Cadillac Eldorado, Lincoln Mark VIII, Jaguar XJS, Bentley Continental, Maserati Shamal/Ghibli, Ferrari 456 and BMW 8 Series coupe. At that point, Toyota's luxury coupé was the Soarer. A coupe would complement the successful Lexus flagship model, the V8-powered, rear-wheel drive LS 400 sedan. The coupé would target the American market, and the development effort for its exterior design was given to the Calty Design Research center in California in 1987.

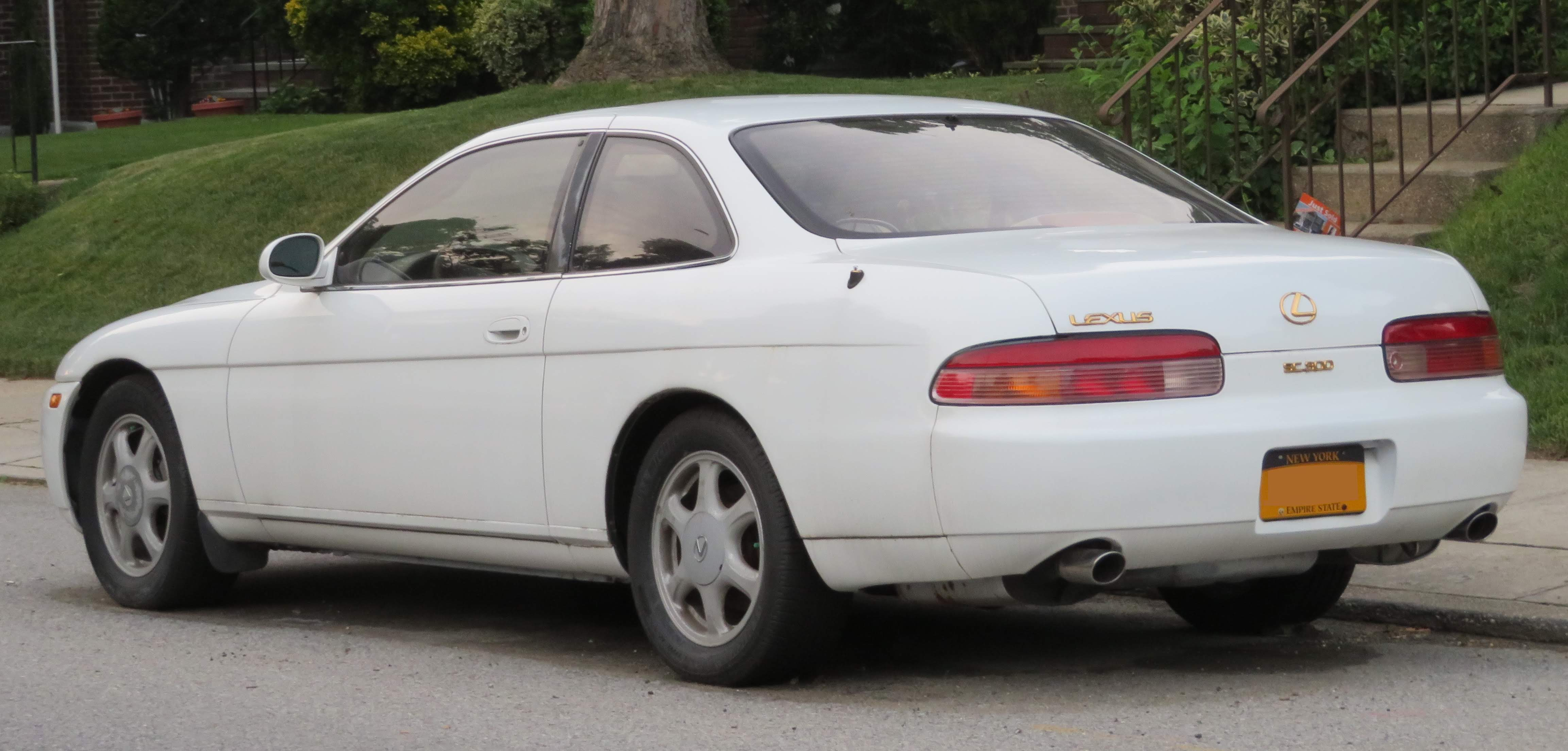
1994–1996 Lexus SC 300

The American Calty design team took an unusual approach to designing the car, using plaster molding shapes to study body forms, and working in three rather than two dimensions. As described by design chiefs Dennis Campbell and Erwin Lui, the result was a car that was based on "emotion and feeling" rather than linear aesthetics. The resulting design possessed few straight edges and produced a drag coefficient of Cd=0.31. The production design concept by Lui was approved at the beginning of 1989, and Lui was sent back to Japan for four months to assist in completion of the production design. According to automotive journalist Bill Russ, the SC design was considered influential among automotive designs of the time. A distinctive feature was the articulating door hinges: when the doors opened, the hinges moved out and forward, allowing easier entry and exit in tight spaces.

Production of the Soarer started in April 1991 at the Motomachi plant in Toyota, Aichi, with the Lexus SC produced alongside the Soarer at a second Higashi Fuji plant at Susono, Shizuoka. Motomachi-sourced cars lasted until April 1997. The Lexus SC platform was used to develop Toyota's next generation Supra, both vehicles were manufactured in the same plant. From 1990-1996 the previously installed TEMS active suspension system was replaced with Toyota Active Control Suspension as an optional upgrade.

The SC 400 débuted on 1 June 1991 in the United States as a 1992 model. The SC 400's 4.0 L V8 1UZ-FE, the same engine as used in the LS 400, was reported to have cost over US$400,000,000 in research and development. The engine sits behind the front axles, which makes it a front mid engine rear wheel drive vehicle. The SC 400 was honored as the Motor Trend Import Car of the Year for 1992. It also made Car and Driver magazine's Ten Best list from 1992 through 1996.

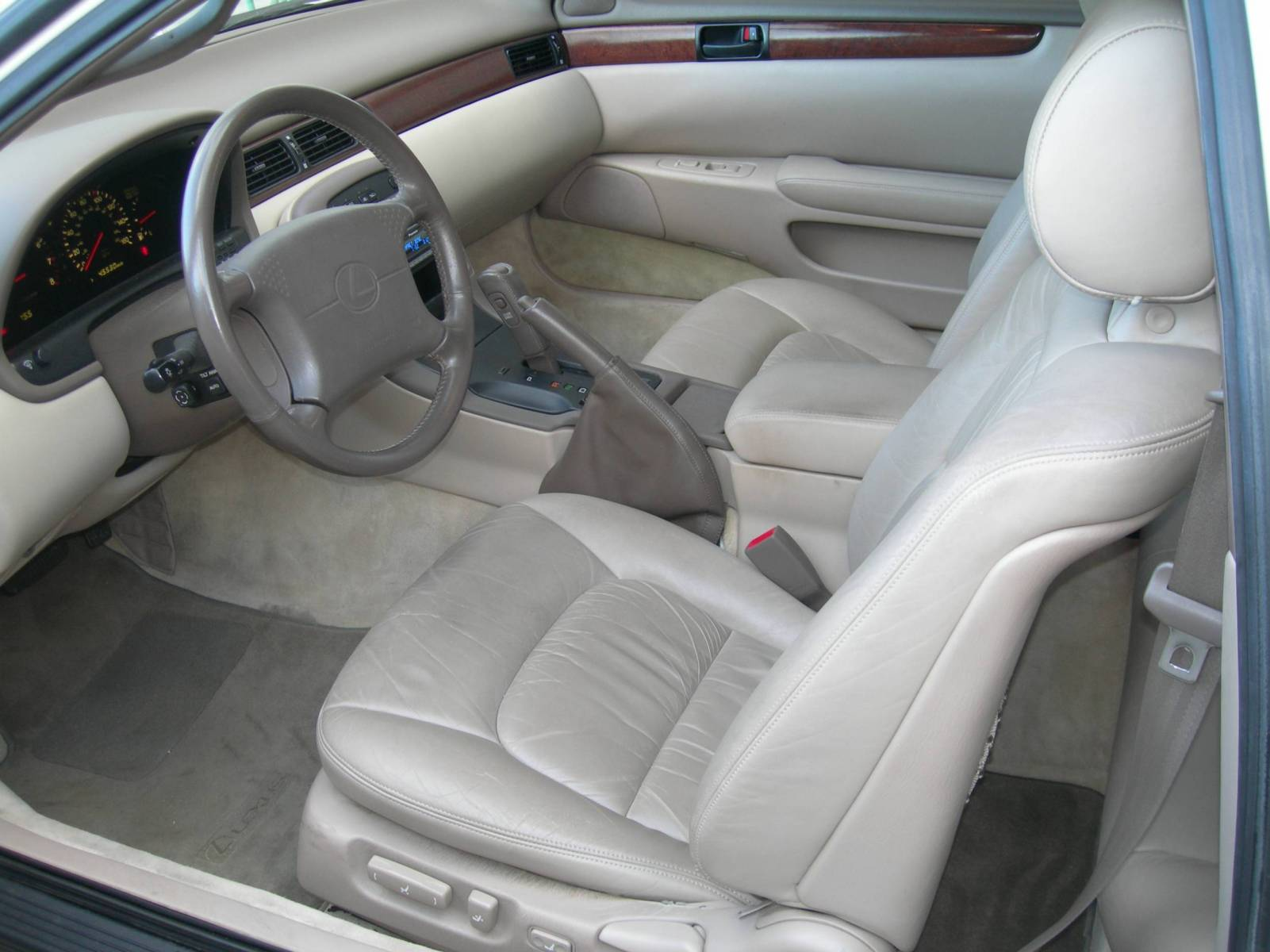
Interior

In July 1992, the SC 300, a smaller-engined version of the SC 400, premiered in the United States. The SC 300 was equipped with a 3.0 L inline 6 2JZ-GE. Lexus' traction control system, TRAC, was offered as an option.

The first-generation SC lasted in production until 7 July 2000, over nine years, with only minor exterior changes, including revised tail lighting and a modified spoiler as part of the mid-cycle refresh. A front grille was added in 1996, along with a redesigned front bumper, side skirts and rocker panels. The SC 400 produced 250 hp (186 kW)/260 lb⋅ft (353 N⋅m) from 1991 to 1995. The original 1991–1997 engines for the 2JZ-GE-powered SC 300 were rated at 225 hp (168 kW)/210 lb⋅ft (285 N⋅m). The output of the SC 300 was 5 horsepower more than the equivalent engine used in the Toyota Supra.

In 1996, the SC 400's 1UZ-FE engine design was upgraded to 260 hp (194 kW) from 250 hp (186 kW). These engines were coupled with a 4-speed automatic transmission on both the SC 300 and SC 400 models. A 5-speed manual transmission was only offered on the SC 300 from its debut until 1997.

By the end of the decade, North American SC sales began dwindling due to the lack of significant design updates since the car's introduction and marketplace changes that led to loss of interest in coupes.

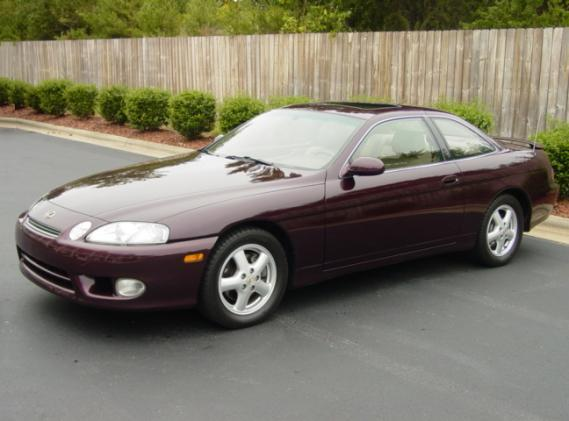
1998 Lexus SC 400

In 1997 (1998 model year), both the SC 300 and 400 were upgraded with VVT-i and thus the ratings were raised to 290 hp (216 kW)/300 lb⋅ft (407 N⋅m) of torque for the SC 400 and 225 hp (168 kW)/220 lb⋅ft (298 N⋅m) of torque for the SC 300. Tests conducted on the new engines showed an acceleration for the SC 400 for years 1992–1995 of 0–60 mph in 6.9 seconds, years 1996–1997 in 6.7 seconds, and years 1998–2000 in 6.1 seconds. For the SC 300 an acceleration 0–60 mph in 6.8 seconds with the 5-speed manual and 7.2 seconds with the 4-speed automatic for all years. This 1997 upgrade included the replacement of the four-speed automatic on the SC 400 to a five-speed unit. With the replacement of the five-speed unit those models also got a new differential with a final drive of 3.27 improving both fuel economy and top speed.

Sales of the automatic transmission SC 300 and SC 400 models formed the vast majority of models purchased. The Lexus SC 400 was never officially sold in the British Isles, but many examples found their way across the Atlantic as personal imports.

== Second generation (Z40; 2001) ==
Second generation (Z40)
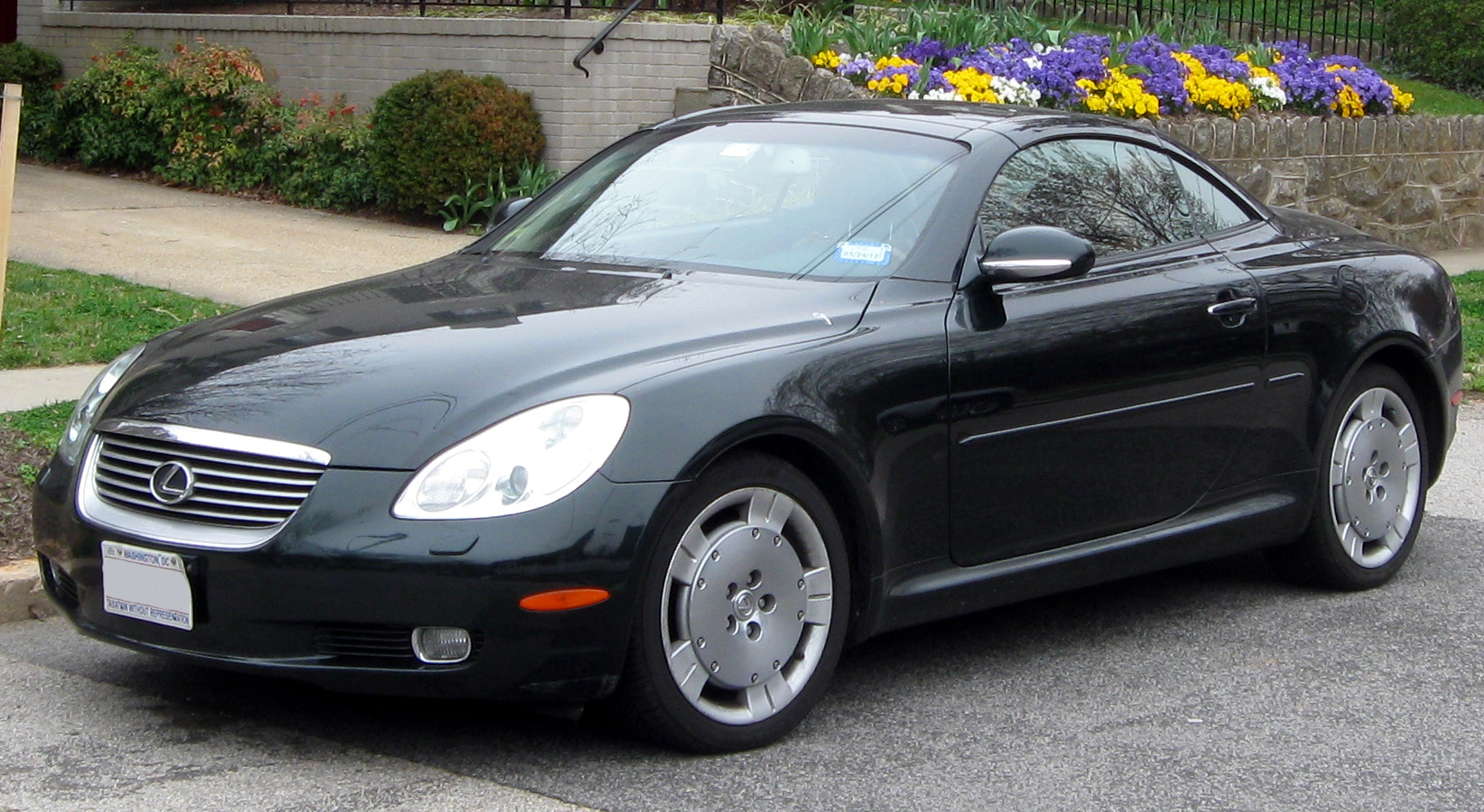
- 2001–2005 Lexus SC 430

Overview
- Also called: Toyota Soarer (Japan, 2001–2005)
- Production: January 2001 – July 2010
- Model years: 2001–2010
- Assembly: Japan: Susono, Shizuoka (Higashi Fuji plant)
- Designer: Sotiris Kovos (1997–1998)

Body and chassis
- Body style: 2-door coupé convertible

Powertrain
- Engine: 4.3 L 3UZ-FE V8
- Transmission: 5-speed A650E automatic (2002–05); 6-speed A761E automatic (2006–10)

Dimensions
- Wheelbase: 103.1 in (2,619 mm)
- Length: 177.8 in (4,516 mm) (2002–05); 178.5 in (4,534 mm) (2006–10)
- Width: 72.0 in (1,829 mm)
- Height: 53.1 in (1,349 mm)
- Curb weight: 3,840 lb (1,742 kg)

=== 2001–2005 ===
At the 1999 Tokyo Motor Show, Lexus displayed its Sport Coupe concept, a V8-powered convertible, signifying its plans for a replacement for the first-generation SC 300/400. The production version of its new sports coupe-convertible, the SC 430, debuted at the New York Auto Show in April 2000. The car was scheduled to go on sale in the second quarter of the following year. Power was provided by a 4.3 L 3UZ-FE V8 engine with variable valve timing (VVT-i) mated to a five-speed automatic transmission. This engine was the same model as that found in the UCF30 Lexus LS. The SC 430's V8 could produce 288 hp (215 kW) and 430 N⋅m (317 lb⋅ft) of torque, allowing the coupe to go from 0–60 mph in 6.2 seconds.

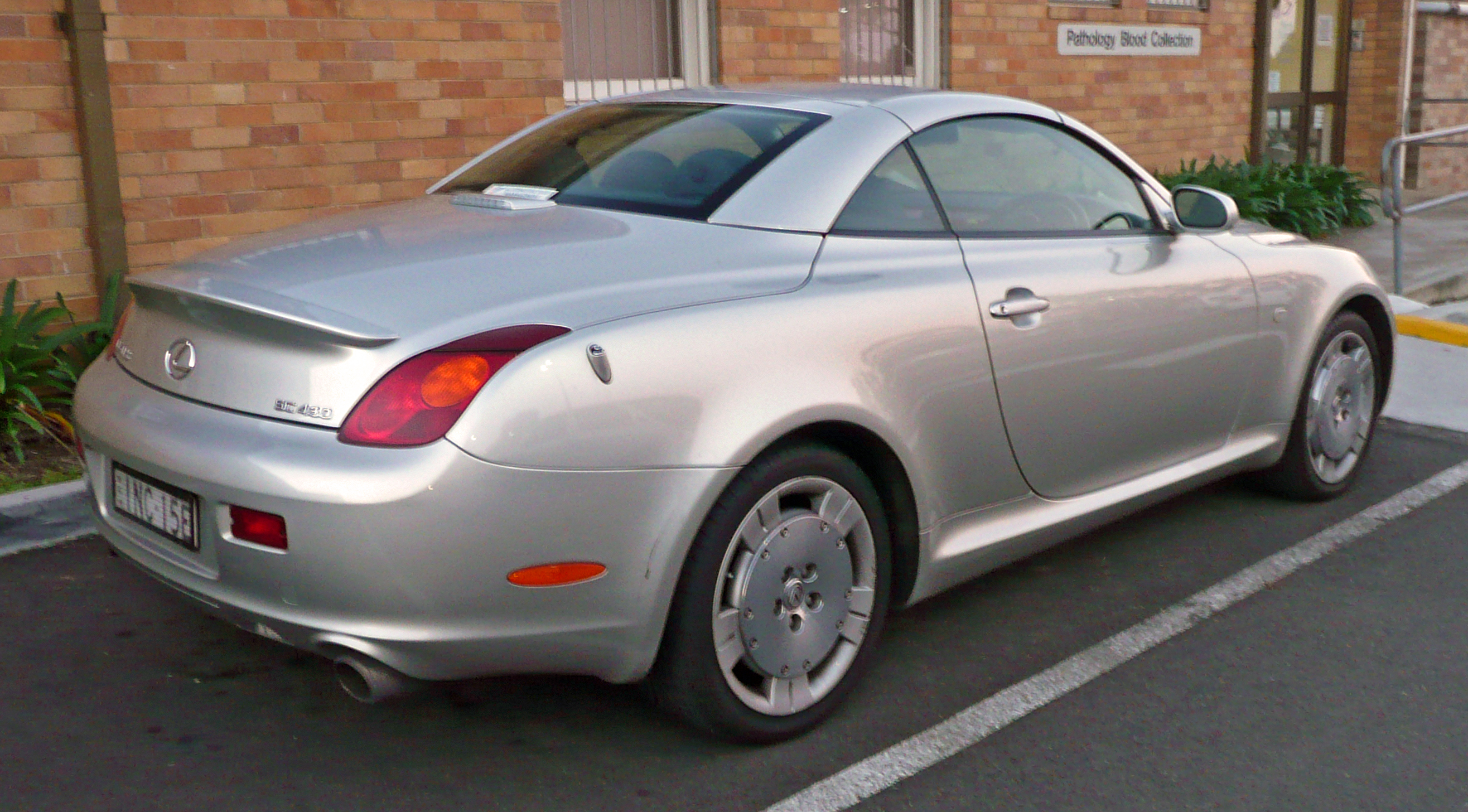
2001–2005 Lexus SC 430

In contrast with the previous generation model, the redesigned Lexus SC was intended as a convertible from its inception. The development team was led by chief engineer Yasushi Nakagawa from 1996 to 2000. Lexus designers from Europe and Japan worked together to create a streamlined design. A design theme was chosen in 1997 developed by Sotiris Kovos, who in return was named chief designer. Led by Kovos, designers travelled to the Côte d'Azur to develop the vehicle's exterior shape, and studied the region's architecture, lifestyle, and harbors. The resulting convertible of 1998 received character lines similar to the region's yachts, in contrast with traditional waveform lines. The vehicle's side profile, the product of extensive wind tunnel testing, was intended to channel air around the passenger compartment at high speed during top-down driving. Design patents were filed in Japan, at the Japan Patent Office on 14 June 1999 under patent number 1095312.

The SC 430 chassis featured a double-wishbone setup for both the front and rear wheels. The vehicle platform shared elements with the GS 430 sport sedan, including variable-assist power rack-and-pinion steering. Safety systems ranged from traction control to vehicle stability control. The convertible received a ULEV emissions certification rating.

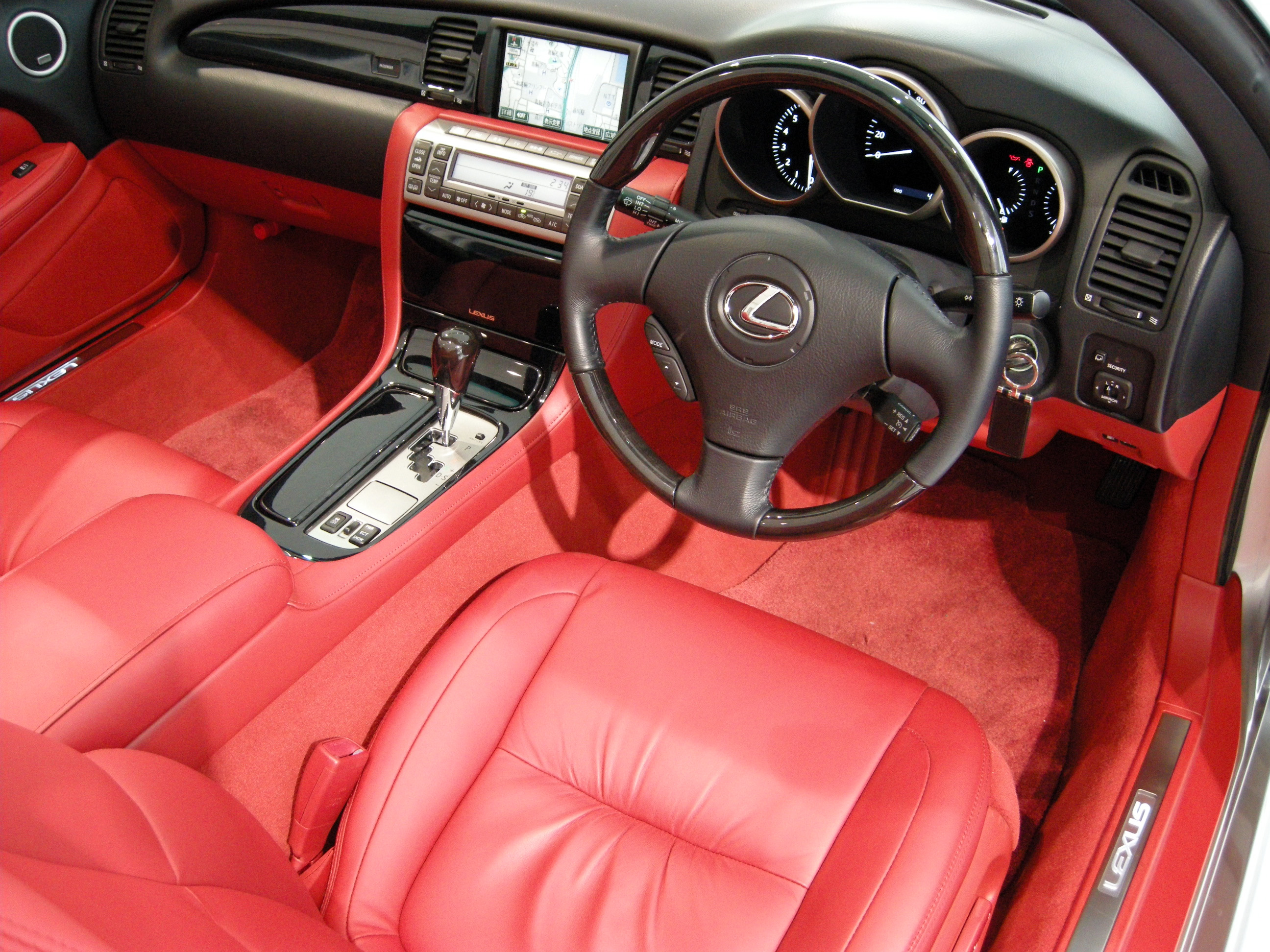
Interior, 2005–2010 Lexus SC 430 (Japan)

The SC 430 featured a retractable aluminium hardtop, all-leather interior with brushed-aluminum accents, navigation screen with folding wood panel, and 18-inch aluminium wheels. Chrome Lexus emblems were mounted on the back of the front seat headrests. The coupe has four seat belts and could technically seat four, but rear-seat space is limited. The hardtop fully retracts in 25 seconds. Standard luxury features include Burl Walnut or Bird's Eye Maple wood trim, a Mark Levinson premium sound system, DVD-based navigation system, and headlamp washers. For additional trunk space, as an option the SC 430 could be equipped with run-flat tires.

At its launch, the SC 430 was marketed as the "jewel of Lexus", and as the marque's first convertible, was intended as a more ostentatious addition to the Lexus lineup. Reviewers from Car and Driver magazine praised the SC 430 for 2002 as "an unqualified success", calling it "comfortable, fast, smooth, and quiet" with "all of the virtues expected in a patrician roadster."

In 2003, for the 2004 model year, Lexus unveiled the Lexus SC "Pebble Beach Edition", a limited-production model of the SC for the US market. The special edition SC featured a unique exterior and interior colour combination which changed each model year. This edition was offered for model years 2004 to 2009 and was limited to a small number of units each year (see table below for counts). Each Lexus SC Pebble Beach edition coupe exhibited: unique colours (changed each year), special badging (featuring the "Lone Cypress" logo) on the front fenders, centre console, and floor mats. In 2005, for the 2006 model year, a rear spoiler and spider alloy wheels was also included.

In 2004 and 2005, J.D. Power and Associates' Initial Quality Survey awarded the SC 430 as the highest ranked premium luxury vehicle. Kelley Blue Book gave the SC 430 its Best to Hold Value Award in 2002. In June 2004, a custom-designed Carolina Herrera SC 430 was shown at the Madrid Motor Show. The special edition SC 430 CH used a 'Testa di Moro' body color, with matching interior leather and carpeting, along with designer logos on the wheels and door sills. A line of accessories was also developed for the vehicle.

In 2012, Top Gear presenters Jeremy Clarkson and James May chose the Lexus SC 430 as the worst car ever built in their film The Worst Car in the History of the World. They criticized its handling, ride and style, with May calling the ride "absolutely diabolical", and stated that a big manufacturer should have known better.

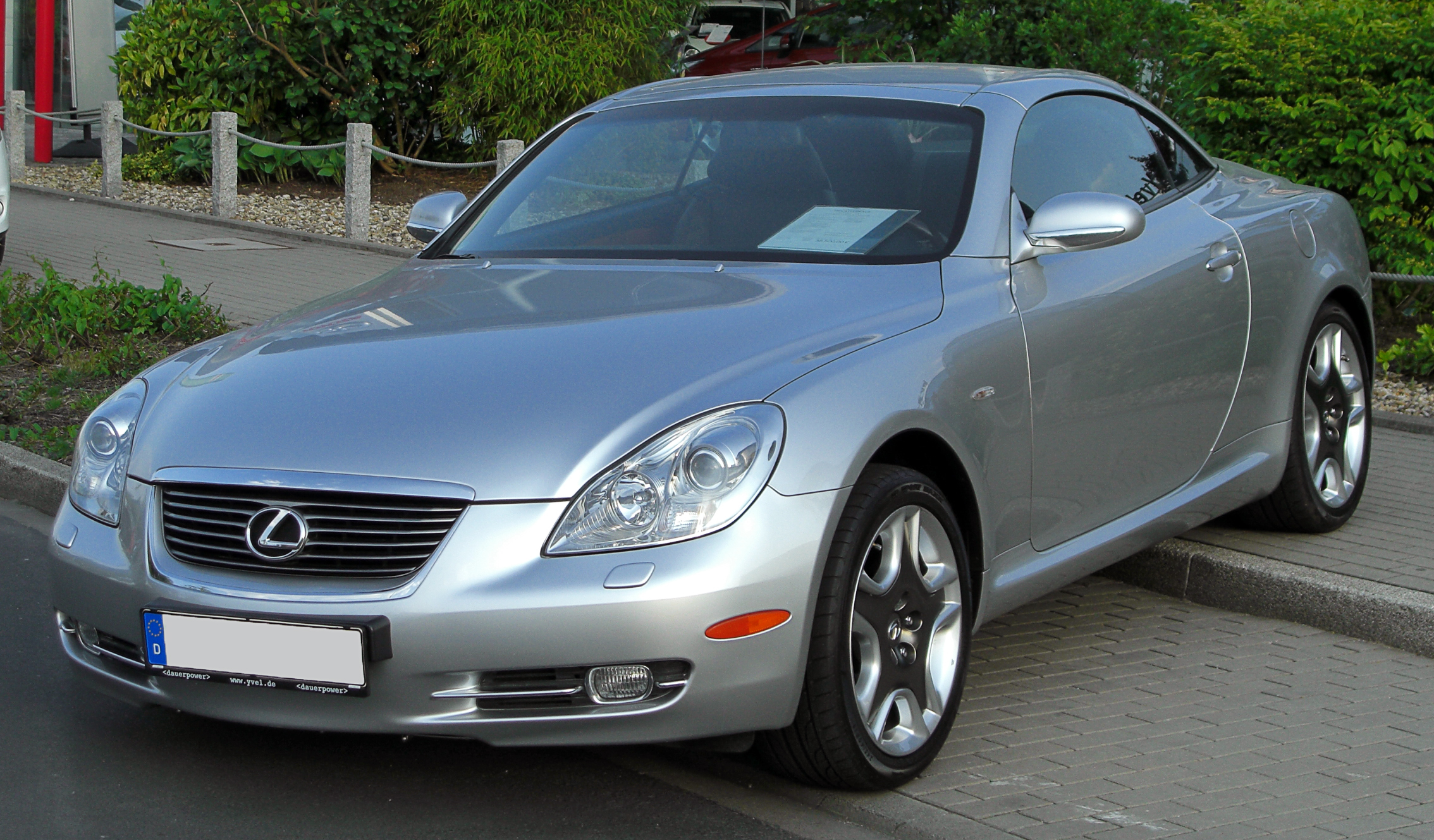
2005–2010 Lexus SC 430 (Germany)

=== 2006–2010 ===
In 2005 for the 2006 model year, the SC 430 was updated, with changes that included redesigned alloy wheels and the introduction of Bluetooth capability. In late 2005, the SC 430 premiered along with the Lexus marque in Japan; it was manufactured at the Kanji (Kanto Jidosha) assembly site in Japan. The SC 430 was sold in North America, Europe, Oceania, and Asia; unlike its predecessor, the SC 430 was officially imported to the British Isles; the old SC 400 had been a popular personal grey import.

In 2010, a final special edition model for Japan, the SC 430 Eternal Jewel edition, was produced, limited to 200 units. The 2010 model was the last automobile from any major manufacturer in the United States to ship with a cassette tape deck.

Production of the second-generation SC ended in July 2010 after nine years of production, but Lexus was still using them in the Super GT until the 2013 season ended.

== Replacement ==
In July 2008, Edmunds InsideLine had reported that Lexus had cancelled the next generation SC due to slowing sales. A company spokesman did not confirm or deny the rumors, but called the report in the possible replacement with the introduction of the Lexus LFA as "unfounded speculation". Lexus subsequently announced the production of the SC 430 model for 2009, and in 2010.

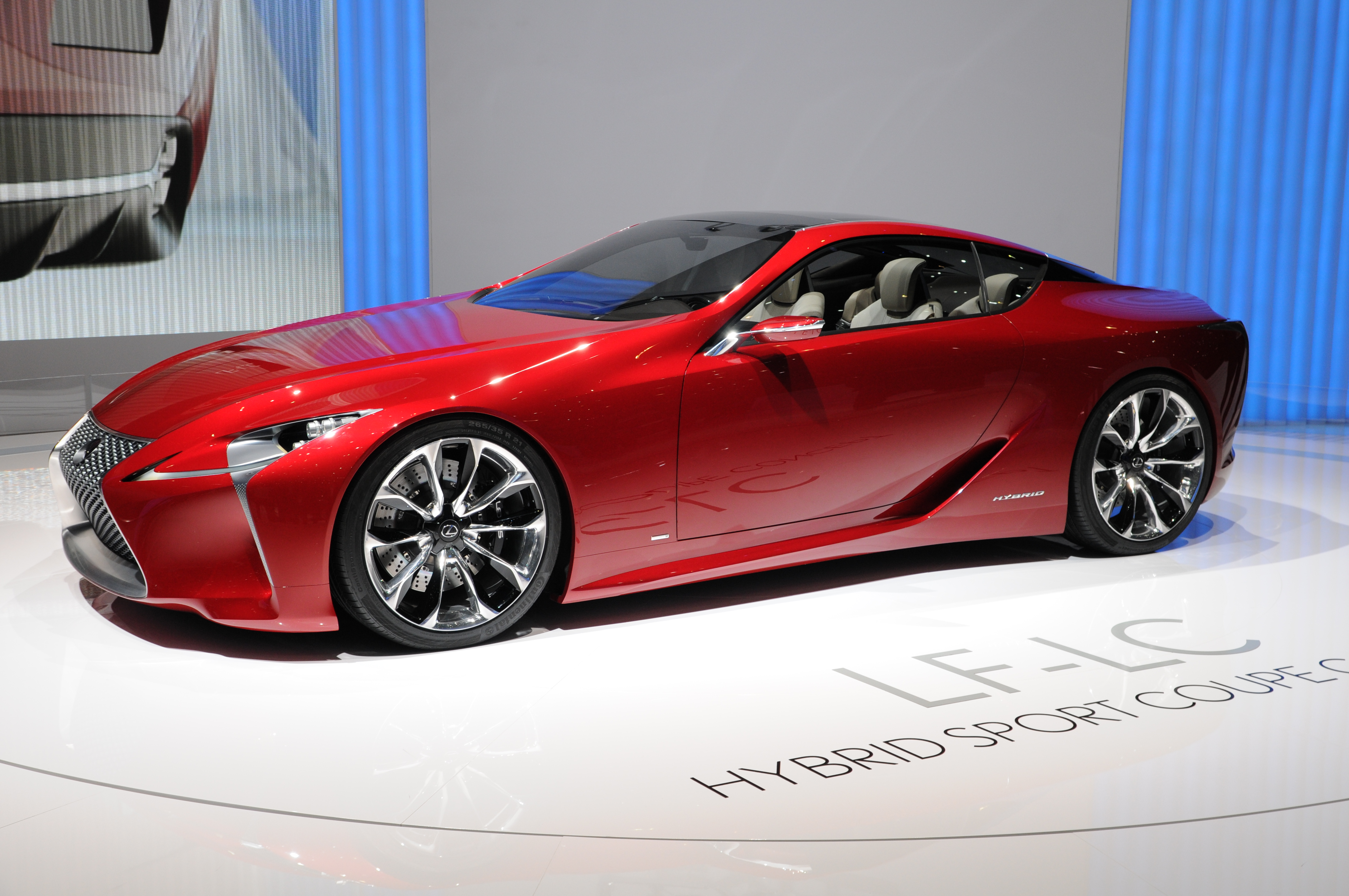
Lexus LF-LC concept at the 2012 Geneva Auto Show

Designated LF-LC for Lexus Future-Luxury Coupe, the concept two-door vehicle premiered in January 2012 at the North American International Auto Show. The vehicle's exterior and interior styling was created by the Calty Design Research center in Newport Beach, California, which previously developed the exterior styling of the first-generation Lexus SC coupe.

The LF-LC features a front-engine, rear-wheel drive drivetrain layout, which incorporates a next-generation Advanced Lexus Hybrid Drive system. The interior features a remote touchscreen control system linked to two liquid crystal display (LCD) screens that measure 12.3 inches (310 mm) in width. Smartphone-size touchscreens are placed on the door armrests for additional controls.

The LF-LC was produced as a design study for a driver-focused vehicle at the direction of the Lexus Center in Japan, and work began on the concept in May 2010. The exterior appearance of the LF-LC was inadvertently leaked by Road & Track magazine several weeks prior to its scheduled auto show debut, when a preview of its February 2012 issue with the LF-LC on its cover (under the headline "Stunning! New Lexus Super Coupe") was posted to YouTube.

A series production model inspired by the 2012 LF-LC Concept is being developed under the Toyota 950A development program. Introduced at the 2016 North American International Auto Show, it went on sale as the Lexus LC 500 in early 2017, based on the new Toyota GA-L modular rear-wheel drive platform and the fifth generation LS flagship.

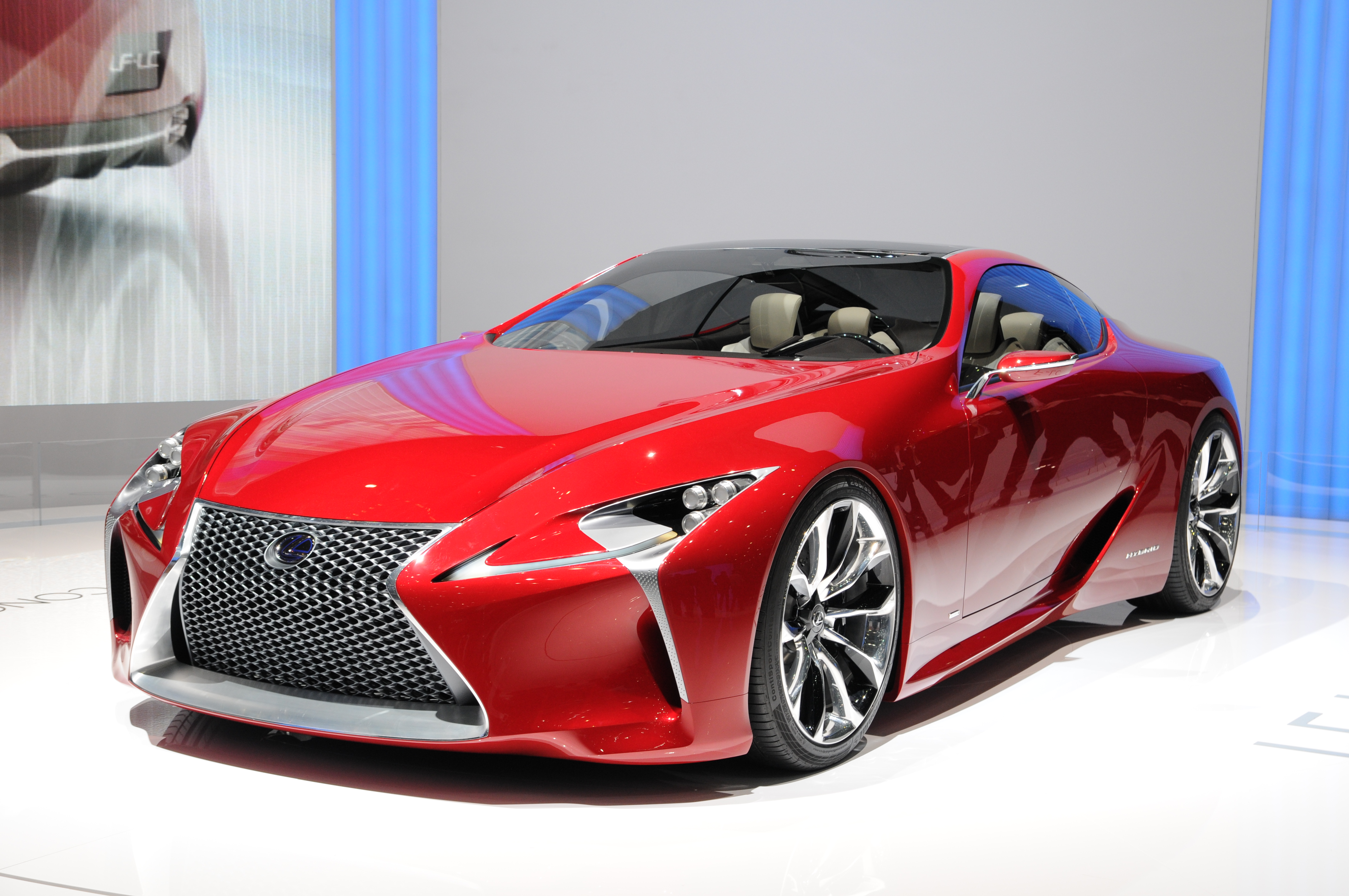
LF-LC with spindle grille

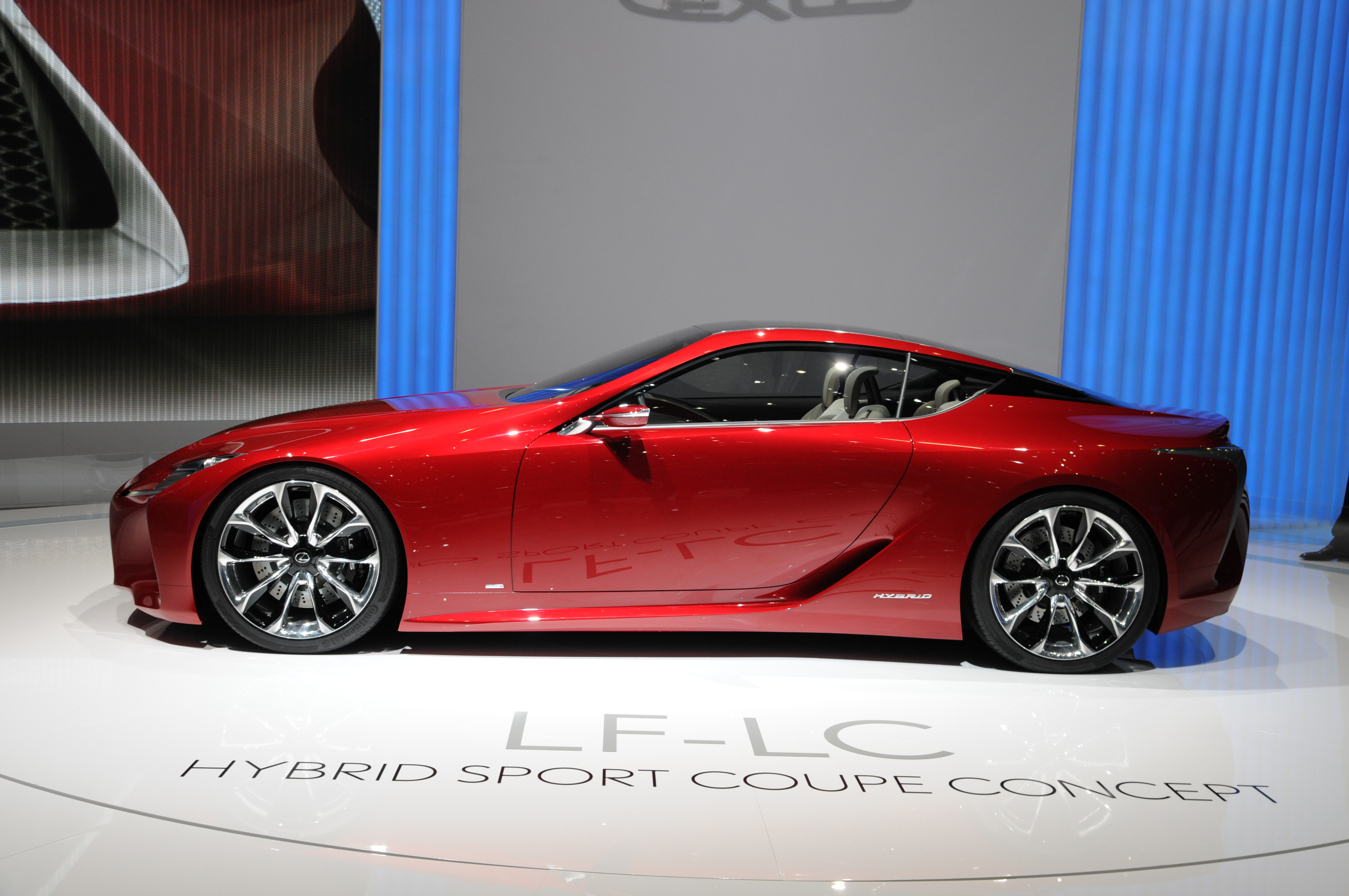
Side of the LF-LC

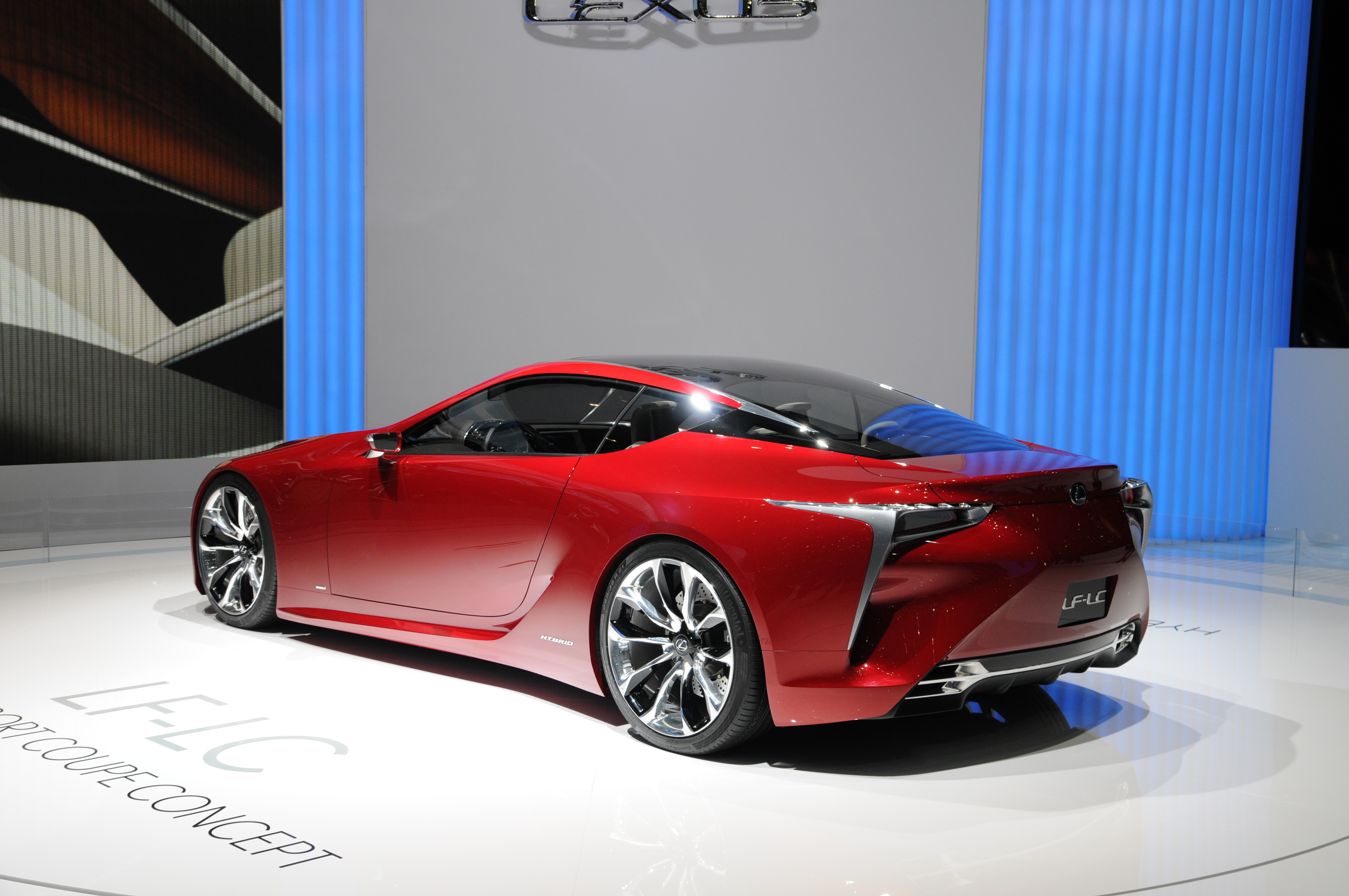
Rear of the LF-LC

== Motorsport ==
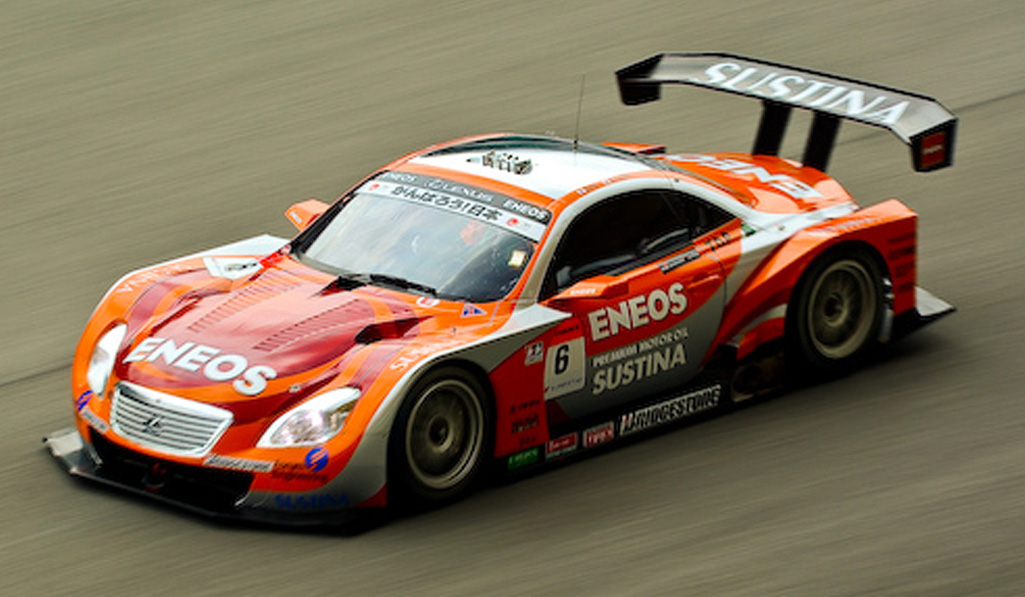
SC 430 ENEOS Super GT racer

In 2006 the SC 430 was entered in the (Super GT) race series in the GT500 class (cars with approximately 500 horsepower). Extensively modified from the factory car, the engine used is a modified version of the SC 430's 3UZ-FE V8 that was also used in the Toyota Supra racing car from previous years.

The new SC 430 based race cars were immediately competitive with former GT500 champion Juichi Wakisaka and no. 2 driver André Lotterer driving the Open Interface TOM's SC to victory at the opening round at Suzuka giving the SC 430 its first victory on its debut race. Juichi Wakisaka and Andre Lotterer also won the GT500 class championship during the same year. In 2007, the Lexus SC fully replaced Supras in the Toyota side, a Zent Cerumo SC 430 driven by Yuji Tachikawa was victorious in the GT500 opening round race.

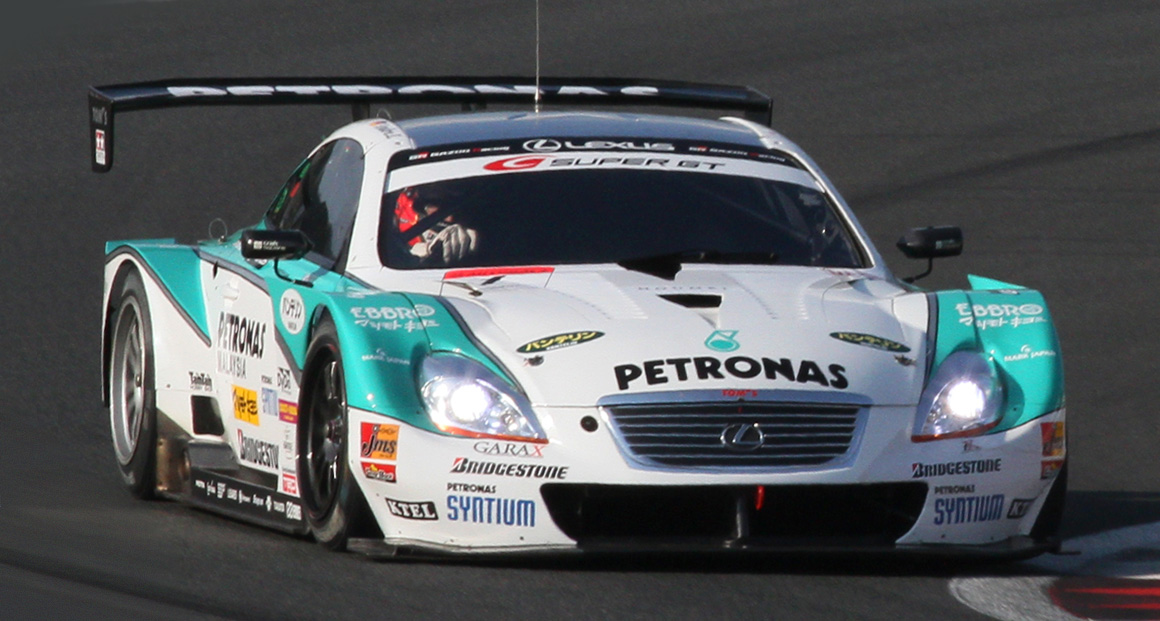
SC 430 Petronas GT500 racer

In 2008, a Zent Cerumo SC 430 driven by Yuji Tachikawa and Richard Lyons won the Fuji 500 race, round 3 of the Autobacs Super GT at Fuji Speedway. In 2009, five SC 430s were entered in Super GT racing in the GT500 class, including the Petronas TOM's SC 430 driven by Juichi Wakisaka and André Lotterer, along with the Eneos SC 430, Kraft SC 430, Dunlop Sard SC 430, and Zent Cerumo SC 430.

In 2009, the Lexus Team Petronas TOM's SC 430 driven by André Lotterer and Juichi Wakisaka was the championship winner in the GT500 series, also the SC 430 was victorious in early rounds at the Suzuka Circuit. In 2010, the SC 430 continued in Super GT competition, where the MJ Kraft SC 430 and other Lexus Team Kraft SC 430s won victories at the 2010 Autobacs Super GT at Fuji Speedway. Starting from 2009 until 2013, the SC 430s used Toyota's 3.4L RV8KG V8 engine.

In the 2012 Formula Drift season, Daigo Saito drove a 2JZ-powered Lexus SC430.

== Sales and production ==
Sales and production data for the first and second generations, based on manufacturer's data:

Chassis code	Model no(s).	Calendar year	Total sales, U.S.	Production figures		
Chassis code	Model no(s).	Calendar year	Total sales, U.S.	SC 400 AT	SC 300 AT (MT)	Total
UZZ30/JZZ31	SC 400/300	1992	20,677	19,212	7,074 (1,601)	27,887
UZZ30/JZZ31	SC 400/300	1993	16,075	9,809	6,036 (910)	16,755
UZZ30/JZZ31	SC 400/300	1994	11,929	3,675	1,978 (227)	5,880
UZZ30/JZZ31	SC 400/300	1995	7,906	9,750	5,329 (793)	15,872
UZZ30/JZZ31	SC 400/300	1996	5,047	2,413	2,118 (232)	4,763
UZZ30/JZZ31	SC 400/300	1997	5,041	2,261	2,509 (226)	4,890
UZZ30/JZZ31	SC 400/300	1998	3,009	1,189	1,582	2,771
UZZ30/JZZ31	SC 400/300	1999	2,557	905	1,910	2,815
UZZ30/JZZ31	SC 400/300	2000	631	324	581	905

Chassis code	Model no(s).	Calendar year	Total sales, U.S.	Total sales, Japan	Production figures
Chassis code	Model no(s).	Calendar year	Total sales, U.S.	Total sales, Japan	SC 430 AT
UZZ40
UZZ40	SC 430	2001	14,333 100 Neiman Marcus	not sold	n/a
UZZ40	SC 430	2002	14,462	not sold	25,427
UZZ40	SC 430	2003	10,298	not sold	10,755
UZZ40	SC 430	2004	9,708 400 Pebble Beach	not sold	9,848
UZZ40	SC 430	2005	8,360 600 Pebble Beach	539	8,941
UZZ40	SC 430	2006	5,847 500 Pebble Beach	1,532	8,051
UZZ40	SC 430	2007	3,927 400 Pebble Beach	872	5,673
UZZ40	SC 430	2008	1,986 360 Pebble Beach	621	2,756
UZZ40	SC 430	2009	720 300 Pebble Beach	256	333
UZZ40	SC 430	2010	328	not sold	n/a
UZZ40	SC 430	2011	18	not sold	n/a
UZZ40	SC 430	2012	2	not sold	n/a

== Technical specifications ==
Drivetrain specifications by generation
Model year(s)	Model no.	Chassis code(s)	Engine type	Engine code	Transmission(s)	Power	Torque
1991–1995	SC 400	UZZ31	4.0 L V8	1UZ-FE	4-speed AT	250 hp (186 kW)	260 ft⋅lbf (350 N⋅m) @4400 rpm
1996–1997	SC 400	UZZ31	4.0 L V8	1UZ-FE	4-speed AT	260 hp (194 kW)	270 ft⋅lbf (370 N⋅m) @4800 rpm
1998–2001	SC 400	UZZ31	4.0 L V8	1UZ-FE	5-speed AT	290 hp (216 kW)	300 ft⋅lbf (410 N⋅m) @4000 rpm
1992–1997	SC 300	JZZ31	3.0 L I6	2JZ-GE	4-AT/5-MT	225 hp (168 kW)	210 ft⋅lbf (280 N⋅m) @4800 rpm
1998–2001	SC 300	JZZ31	3.0 L I6	2JZ-GE	4-speed AT	225 hp (168 kW)	220 ft⋅lbf (300 N⋅m) @4000 rpm
2002–2005	SC 430	UZZ40	4.3 L V8	3UZ-FE	5-speed AT	300 hp (224 kW)	325 ft⋅lbf (441 N⋅m) @3400 rpm
2006–2010	SC 430	UZZ40	4.3 L V8	3UZ-FE	6-speed AT	288 hp (215 kW)	317 ft⋅lbf (430 N⋅m) @3400 rpm
