= 2010 Okayama GT 300km =

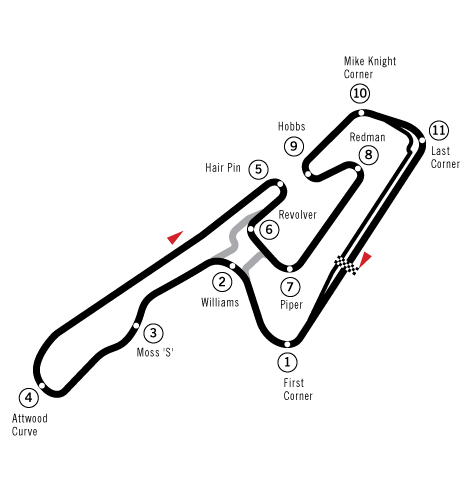
Layout of the Okayama International Circuit

The 2010 Okayama GT 300km was the second round of the 2010 Super GT season. It took place at Okayama International Circuit on April 4, 2010.

== Race ==
Pos	No	Team/Car	Drivers	Laps	Time/Retired	Grid	Points
GT500 Results
1	18	Weider HSV-010	(Japan) Takashi Kogure (France) Loïc Duval	82	2:02:26.084	1	20
2	38	ZENT Cerumo SC430	(Japan) Yuji Tachikawa (United Kingdom) Richard Lyons	82	+11.800	2	15
3	1	Petronas TOM'S SC430	(Japan) Juichi Wakisaka (Germany) André Lotterer	82	+14.209	8	11
4	12	Calsonic Impul GT-R	(Japan) Tsugio Matsuda (Italy) Ronnie Quintarelli	82	+14.712	3	8
5	6	ENEOS SC430	(Japan) Daisuke Ito (Sweden) Björn Wirdheim	82	+45.741	5	6
6	8	ARTA HSV-010	(Republic of Ireland) Ralph Firman (Japan) Yuji Ide	82	+48.666	11	5
7	17	Keihin HSV-010	(Japan) Toshihiro Kaneishi (Japan) Koudai Tsukakoshi	82	+57.285	13	4
8	100	Raybrig HSV-010	(Japan) Takuya Izawa (Japan) Naoki Yamamoto	82	+1:11.673	10	3
9	35	MJ Kraft SC430	(Japan) Hiroaki Ishiura (Japan) Kazuya Oshima	81	+1 Lap	4	2
10	39	Denso Dunlop SARD SC430	(Portugal) André Couto (Japan) Kohei Hirate	81	+1 Lap	9	1
11	32	Epson HSV-010	(Japan) Ryo Michigami (Japan) Yuhki Nakayama	81	+1 Lap	6	
12	24	HIS Advan Kondo GT-R	(Brazil) João Paulo de Oliveira (Japan) Hironobu Yasuda	81	+1 Lap	12	
DNF	23	Motul Autech GT-R	(Japan) Satoshi Motoyama (France) Benoît Tréluyer	15	Collision	7	
GT300 Results
1	46	Up Start MOLA Z	(Japan) Naoki Yokomizo (Japan) Tsubasa Abe	76	2:03:22.023	2	20
2	2	Apple•K•One Shiden	(Japan) Hiroki Katoh (Japan) Hiroshi Hamaguchi	76	+26.160	8	15
3	3	Hasemi Sport Tomica Z	(Japan) Kazuki Hoshino (Japan) Masataka Yanagida	76	+32.261	12	11
4	86	JLOC Lamborghini RG-3	(Japan) Tetsuji Tamanaka (Japan) Haruki Kurosawa	76	+37.676	1	8
5	31	apr Corolla Axio	(Japan) Koki Saga (Japan) Kosuke Matsuura	76	+37.929	3	6
6	43	ARTA Garaiya	(Japan) Morio Nitta (Japan) Shinichi Takagi	75	+1 Lap	6	5
7	11	Jim Gainer Dixcel Dunlop F430	(Japan) Tetsuya Tanaka (Japan) Katsuyuki Hiranaka	75	+1 Lap	13	4
8	33	Hankook Porsche	(Japan) Mitsuhiro Kinoshita (Japan) Masami Kageyama	75	+1 Lap	19	3
9	74	Corolla Axio apr GT	(Japan) Takuto Iguchi (Japan) Yuji Kunimoto	75	+1 Lap	5	2
10	9	Hatsunemiku X GSR Porsche	(Japan) Taku Bamba (Japan) Masahiro Sasaki	75	+1 Lap	17	1
11	27	NAC Eiseicom LMP Ferrari	(Japan) Yutaka Yamagishi (Japan) Hiroshi Koizumi	74	+2 Laps	16	
12	62	R&D Sport Legacy B4	(Japan) Tetsuya Yamano (Japan) Kota Sasaki	74	+2 Laps	18	
13	26	Cinecitta Taisan Porsche	(Ukraine) Igor Sushko (Japan) Masayuki Ueda	74	+2 Laps	15	
14	19	WedsSport IS350	(Japan) Manabu Orido (Japan) Tatsuya Kataoka	73	+3 Laps	4	
15	66	triple a Vantage GT2	(Japan) Hideshi Matsuda (Japan) Hiroki Yoshimoto	70	+6 Laps	10	
16	88	JLOC Lamborghini RG-3	(Japan) Atsushi Yogo (Japan) Shinya Hosokawa	68	+8 Laps	14	
17	87	JLOC Lamborghini RG3	(Japan) Hiroyuki Iiri (Japan) Yuya Sakamoto	60	+16 Laps	9	
18	7	M7 Mutiara Motors Amemiya SGC7	(Japan) Nobuteru Taniguchi (Japan) Ryo Orime	54	+22 Laps	11	
DNF	5	Machgogogo Shaken 408R	(Japan) Tetsuji Tamanaka (Japan) Haruki Kurosawa	16	+60 Laps	7	
DSQ	365	365 Thunder Asia Racing Mosler MT900M	(Singapore) Melvin Choo (United Kingdom) Tim Sugden	–	Disqualification	20	

Super GT
Previous race: Suzuka GT 300km	2010 season	Next race: Fuji GT 400km
