= 2009 Porsche Carrera Cup Asia =

Motorsport racing season

The 2009 Porsche Carrera Cup Asia was the seventh season of the Porsche Carrera Cup Asia. The season commenced on April 17 at the Shanghai International Circuit and finished at the Sepang International Circuit on December 6.

Christian Menzel won his first of two Porsche Carrera Cup Asia titles after securing the title by one point over season-long rival, Tim Sugden. The B-Class championship honors went to Hong Kong driver Philip Ma.

== Calendar ==
The following venues hosted at least one round of the 2009 championship.

Round	Circuit	Date	Supporting
1	Shanghai International Circuit, Shanghai, China	17–19 April	Chinese Grand Prix; Aston Martin Asia Cup
2	Goldenport Park Circuit, Beijing, China	9–10 May	Stand-alone event
3	Zhuhai International Circuit, Zhuhai, China	20–21 June	Asian GT Series
4	Sentul International Circuit, Sentul City, Indonesia	15–16 August	Asian Touring Car Series; Formula BMW Pacific
5	Marina Bay Street Circuit, Marina Bay, Singapore	25–27 September	Singapore Grand Prix; Formula BMW Pacific; Aston Martin Asia Cup
6	Shanghai International Circuit, Shanghai, China	7–8 November	China Touring Car Championship
7	Sepang International Circuit, Selangor, Malaysia	5–6 December	Stand-alone event

== Teams and drivers ==
Team	No.	Driver	Class	Rounds
(Australia) Peter Boylan Racing	2	(Australia) Peter Boylan		5
(Singapore) SC Global Racing	3	(United Kingdom) Danny Watts		5
(Singapore) Team PCS Racing	5	(Singapore) Yuey Tan	B	All
(Singapore) Team PCS Racing	32	(New Zealand) Craig Baird		5
(Singapore) Team PCS Racing	32	(Singapore) David Lai	B	1
(Singapore) Team PCS Racing	33	(Singapore) Weng Mok Sun		1–2, 4–7
(Singapore) Team PCS Racing	33	(Singapore) Ian Mao Tan	B	3
(Sri Lanka) Dilango Racing	6	(Sri Lanka) Dilantha Malagamuwa		1–2, 5
(Singapore) PTRS Motorsport	7	(Chinese Taipei) Jeffrey Lee		All
(Italy) Augusto Perfetti	8	(Italy) Augusto Perfetti	B	1
(Singapore) Team Kangshun	11	(Singapore) Ringo Chong		1–3, 5–6
(Netherlands) Chu Racing Team	16	(Netherlands) Danny Chu		All
(Hong Kong) Tara Racing	17	(Hong Kong) Alain Li		5
(Macau) Asia Racing Team	20	(Macau) Rodolfo Ávila		All
(Malaysia) Arrows Racing Team	51	(Malaysia) Tunku Hammam	B	5
(Hong Kong) Team Jebsen	55	(Hong Kong) Darryl O'Young		All
(Hong Kong) Omak	68	(Hong Kong) Mak Hing Tak	B	All
(Singapore) Corum ThunderAsia Racing	69	(Singapore) Melvin Choo	B	1–2, 4–7
(Singapore) Corum ThunderAsia Racing	69	(Malaysia) Eric Yeo Tee Eong		3
(Hong Kong) GruppeM Racing	88	(United Kingdom) Tim Sugden		All
(Hong Kong) Jacob & Co. Racing	98	(Hong Kong) Philip Ma	B	All
(Singapore) Team StarChase	99	(Germany) Christian Menzel		All

Icon	Class
B	B Class
	Guest Starter

== Results ==
Round		Circuit	Pole Position	Overall Winner	B-Class Pole Position	B-Class Winner
1	R1	(China) Shanghai 1	(Macau) Rodolfo Ávila	(United Kingdom) Tim Sugden	(Singapore) Melvin Choo	(Singapore) Melvin Choo
1	R2	(China) Shanghai 1		(Germany) Christian Menzel		(Singapore) Melvin Choo
2	R1	(China) Beijing	(Hong Kong) Darryl O'Young	(Hong Kong) Darryl O'Young	(Singapore) Melvin Choo	(Singapore) Melvin Choo
2	R2	(China) Beijing		(Germany) Christian Menzel		(Singapore) Melvin Choo
3	R1	(China) Zhuhai	(Germany) Christian Menzel	(Macau) Rodolfo Ávila	(Hong Kong) Philip Ma	(Hong Kong) Philip Ma
3	R2	(China) Zhuhai		(Hong Kong) Darryl O'Young		(Hong Kong) Philip Ma
4	R1	(Indonesia) Sentul	(Germany) Christian Menzel	(Macau) Rodolfo Ávila	(Hong Kong) Philip Ma	(Singapore) Melvin Choo
4	R2	(Indonesia) Sentul		(Germany) Christian Menzel		(Singapore) Melvin Choo
5		Singapore	(Germany) Christian Menzel	(Germany) Christian Menzel	(Singapore) Melvin Choo	(Singapore) Melvin Choo
6	R1	(China) Shanghai 2	(Germany) Christian Menzel	(Germany) Christian Menzel	(Singapore) Melvin Choo	(Singapore) Melvin Choo
6	R2	(China) Shanghai 2		(Germany) Christian Menzel		(Singapore) Melvin Choo
7	R1	(Malaysia) Sepang	(Germany) Christian Menzel	(Hong Kong) Darryl O'Young	(Singapore) Melvin Choo	(Singapore) Melvin Choo
7	R2	(Malaysia) Sepang		(United Kingdom) Tim Sugden		(Singapore) Melvin Choo

== Championship standings ==
=== Scoring system ===
Points were awarded to the top fifteen classified drivers in every race, using the following system:

Position	1st	2nd	3rd	4th	5th	6th	7th	8th	9th	10th	11th	12th	13th	14th	15th	Pole
Points	20	18	16	14	12	10	9	8	7	6	5	4	3	2	1	1

=== Overall ===
Pos.	Driver	SHA1 (China)		BEI (China)		ZHU (China)		SEN (Indonesia)		SIN (Singapore)	SHA2 (China)		SEP (Malaysia)		Points
Pos.	Driver	R1	R2	R3	R4	R5	R6	R7	R8	R9	R10	R11	R12	R13	Points
1	(Germany) Christian Menzel	2	1	2	1	Ret	3	2	1	1	1	1	4	2	227
2	(United Kingdom) Tim Sugden	1	2	3	3	2	2	3	3	4	2	2	2	1	226
3	(Hong Kong) Darryl O'Young	DNS	11	1	2	3	1	4	4	2	3	3	1	4	192
4	(Macau) Rodolfo Ávila	3	3	4	Ret	1	Ret	1	2	3	4	4	3	3	181
5	(Netherlands) Danny Chu	9	6	5	4	DSQ	6	6	5	Ret	5	7	7	6	115
6	(Singapore) Melvin Choo	6	7	9	7			7	6	6	7	6	6	7	102
7	(Hong Kong) Philip Ma	8	12	10	8	5	7	9	7	8	10	10	8	8	99
8	(Singapore) Weng Mok Sun	4	9	8	6			5	Ret	DNS	6	5	5	5	97
9	(Chinese Taipei) Jeffrey Lee	7	8	Ret	9	4	5	8	Ret	10	9	9	9	9	92
10	(Singapore) Ringo Chong	5	5	7	5	Ret	4			7	8	8			84
11	(Singapore) Yuey Tan	Ret	13	11	11	6	10	10	8	9	11	12	10	10	71
12	(Hong Kong) Mak Hing Tak	10	10	12	10	Ret	9	11	Ret	11	12	11	Ret	11	53
13	(Sri Lanka) Dilantha Malagamuwa	Ret	4	6	12					5					40
14	(Singapore) Ian Tan Mao					7	8								17
15	(Malaysia) Eric Yeo Tee Eong					Ret	Ret								0
Pos.	Driver	R1	R2	R3	R4	R5	R6	R7	R8	R9	R10	R11	R12	R13	Points
Pos.	Driver	SHA1 (China)		BEI (China)		ZHU (China)		SEN (Indonesia)		SIN (Singapore)	SHA2 (China)		SEP (Malaysia)		Points

=== B-Class ===
Pos.	Driver	SHA1 (China)		BEI (China)		ZHU (China)		SEN (Indonesia)		SIN (Singapore)	SHA2 (China)		SEP (Malaysia)		Points
Pos.	Driver	R1	R2	R3	R4	R5	R6	R7	R8	R9	R10	R11	R12	R13	Points
1	(Hong Kong) Philip Ma	2	3	2	2	1	1	2	2	2	2	2	2	2	238
2	(Singapore) Melvin Choo	1	1	1	1			1	1	1	1	1	1	1	225
3	(Singapore) Yuey Tan	Ret	4	3	4	2	4	3	3	3	3	4	3	3	186
4	(Hong Kong) Mak Hing Tak	3	2	4	3	Ret	3	4	Ret	4	4	3	Ret	4	152
5	(Singapore) Ian Tan Mao					3	2								34
Pos.	Driver	R1	R2	R3	R4	R5	R6	R7	R8	R9	R10	R11	R12	R13	Points
Pos.	Driver	SHA1 (China)		BEI (China)		ZHU (China)		SEN (Indonesia)		SIN (Singapore)	SHA2 (China)		SEP (Malaysia)		Points

== See also ==
- 2009 Porsche Supercup
- 2009 Porsche Carrera Cup Germany
- 2009 Porsche Carrera Cup Great Britain
