= 2010 Suzuka GT 300km =

First round of 2010 Super GT season

Layout of the Suzuka International Racing Course

The 2010 Suzuka GT 300km was the first round of the 2010 Super GT season. It took place on March 21, 2010.

== Race ==
Pos	No	Team/Car	Drivers	Laps	Time/Retired	Grid	Points
GT500 Results
1	24	HIS Advan Kondo GT-R	(Brazil) João Paulo de Oliveira (Japan) Kironobu Yasuda	52	1:53:23.333	10	20
2	6	ENEOS SC430	(Japan) Daisuke Ito (Sweden) Björn Wirdheim	52	+9.322	4	15
3	100	Raybrig HSV-010	(Japan) Takuya Izawa (Japan) Naoki Yamamoto	52	+15.397	7	11
4	1	Petronas TOM'S SC430	(Japan) Juichi Wakisaka (Germany) André Lotterer	52	+17.954	8	8
5	39	Denso Dunlop SARD SC430	(Portugal) André Couto (Japan) Kohei Hirate	52	+19.326	13	6
6	35	MJ Kraft SC430	(Japan) Hiroaki Ishiura (Japan) Kazuya Oshima	52	+20.363	5	5
7	17	Keihin HSV-010	(Japan) Toshihiro Kaneishi (Japan) Koudai Tsukakoshi	52	+46.508	9	4
8	23	Motul Autech GT-R	(Japan) Satoshi Motoyama (France) Benoît Tréluyer	52	+1:32.333	3	3
9	38	ZENT Cerumo SC430	(Japan) Yuji Tachikawa (United Kingdom) Richard Lyons	51	+1 Lap	2	2
10	32	Epson HSV-010	(Japan) Ryo Michigami (Japan) Yukhi Nakayama	51	+1 Lap	11	1
11 DNF	12	Calsonic Impul GT-R	(Japan) Tsugio Matsuda (Italy) Ronnie Quintarelli	10	Collision	6	
12 DNF	8	ARTA HSV-010	(Republic of Ireland) Ralph Firman (Japan) Yuji Ide	10	Collision	8	
13 DNF	18	Weider HSV-010	(Japan) Takashi Kogure (France) Loïc Duval	10	Collision	1	
GT300 Results
1	7	M7 Mutiara Motors Amemiya SGC7	(Japan) Nobuteru Taniguchi (Japan) Ryo Orime	48	1:53:59.916	1	20
2	46	Up Start MOLA Z	(Japan) Naoki Yokozimo (Japan) Tsubasa Abe	48	+31.894	3	15
3	19	WedsSport IS350	(Japan) Manabu Orido (Japan) Tatsuya Kataoka	48	+36.498	6	11
4	5	Machgogogo Shaken 408R	(Japan) Tetsuji Tamanaka (Japan) Haruki Kurosawa	48	+37.184	19	8
5	3	Hasemi Sport Tomica Z	(Japan) Kazuki Hoshino (Japan) Masataka Yanagida	48	+50.302	7	6
6	33	Hankook Porsche	(Japan) Mitsuhiro Kinoshita (Japan) Masami Kageyama	48	+50.400	12	5
7	86	JLOC Lamborghini RG-3	(Japan) Koji Yamanishi (Japan) Yuhi Sekiguchi	48	+53.837	8	4
8	74	Corolla Axio apr GT	(Japan) Takuto Iguchi (Japan) Yuji Kunimoto	48	+1:02.919	5	3
9	27	NAC Eiseicom LMP Ferrari	(Japan) Yutaka Yamagishi (Japan) Hiroshi Koizumi	48	+1:05.724	13	2
10	87	JLOC Lamborghini RG3	(Japan) Hiroyuki Iiri (Japan) Yuya Sakamoto	48	+1:24.323	10	1
11	26	Cinecitta Taisan Porsche	(Ukraine) Igor Sushko (Japan) Masayuki Ueda	47	+1 Lap	14	
12	9	Hatsunemiku X GSR Porsche	(Japan) Taku Bamba (Japan) Masahiro Sasaki	46	+2 Laps	16	
13	62	R&D Sport Legacy B4	(Japan) Tetsuya Yamano (Japan) Kota Sasaki	44	+4 Laps	20	
14	666	Bomex Lian Boxster	(Japan) Junichiro Yamashita (Japan) Shogo Suho	38	+10 Laps	17	
15 DNF	11	Jim Gainer Dixcel Dunlop F430	(Japan) Tetsuya Tanaka (Japan) Katsuyuki Hiranaka	27	Radiator	2	
16 DNF	31	apr Corolla Axio	(Japan) Koki Saga (Japan) Kosuke Matsuura	1	Collision	9	
17 DNF	43	ARTA Garaiya	(Japan) Morio Nitta (Japan) Shinichi Takagi	1	Collision	4	
18 DNF	2	Apple•K-ONE•Shiden	(Japan) Hiroki Katoh (Japan) Hiroshi Hamaguchi	1	Collision	11	
DSQ	66	triple a Vantage GT2	(Japan) Hideshi Matsuda (Japan) Hiroki Yoshimoto	–	Disqualification	15	

Super GT
Previous race: none	2010 season	Next race: Okayama GT 300km
