= 2010 Super GT Series =

18th season of sports car racing series

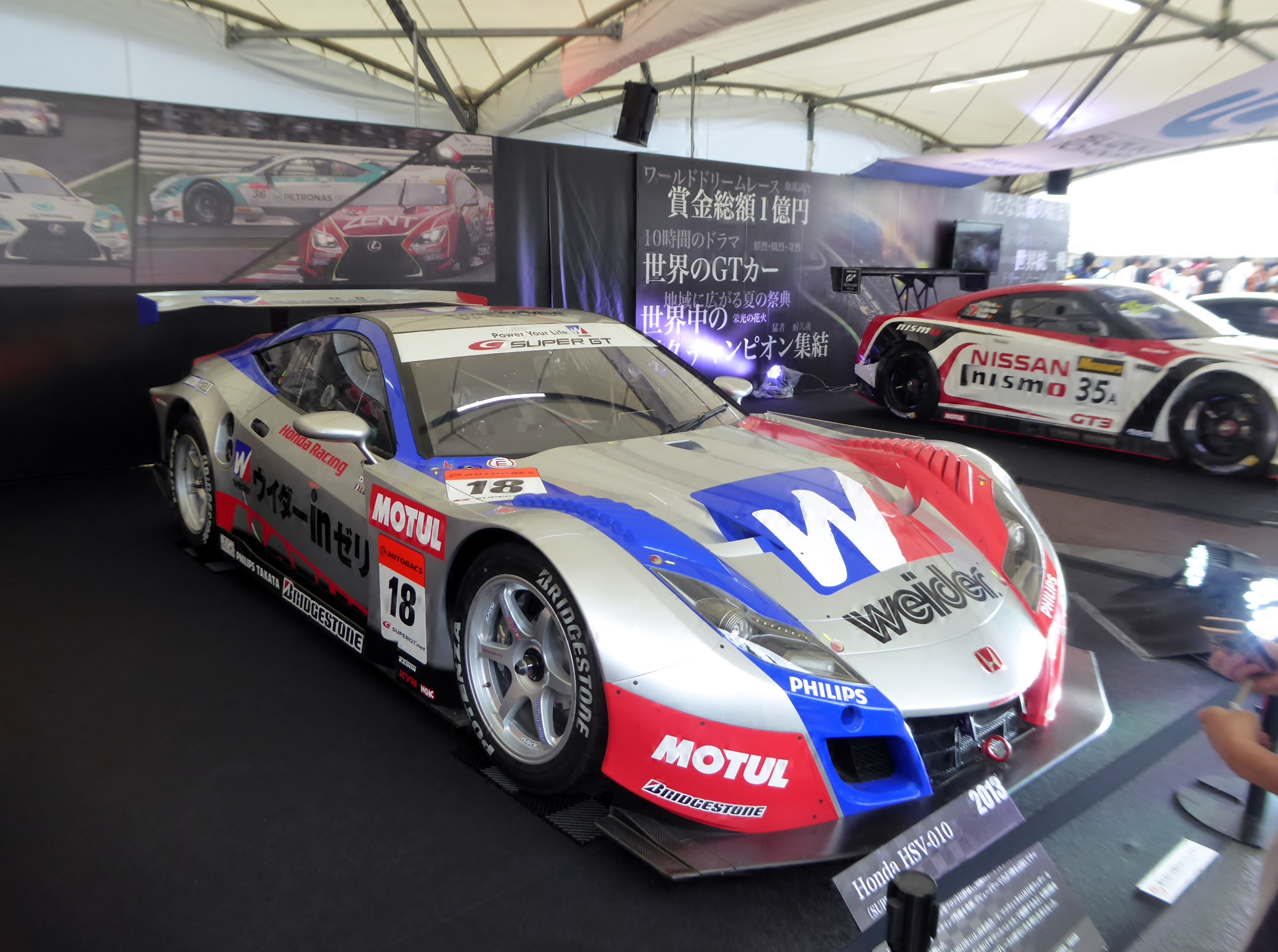
The No. 18 Weider Honda Racing Honda HSV-010 GT of Takashi Kogure and Loïc Duval on display. Kogure and Duval each claimed their first Super GT championship. Weider Honda Racing also won the GT500 Teams title, ahead of Team TOM'S.

The 2010 Autobacs Super GT Series was the eighteenth season of the Japan Automobile Federation Super GT Championship including the All Japan Grand Touring Car Championship (JGTC) era and the sixth season as the Super GT series. It also marked the twenty-eighth season of a JAF-sanctioned sports car racing championship dating back to the All Japan Sports Prototype Championship.

Starting in 2010, Group GT3 cars were eligible to enter in the GT300 class under Category F.

In both classes, every race was won by a different pairing, with the Weider Honda Racing duo Takashi Kogure and Loïc Duval eventually becoming GT500 champions for the first time, giving the Honda HSV-010 GT a championship-winning début season. Defending champions Juichi Wakisaka and André Lotterer finished the season as runners-up, while Toshihiro Kaneishi and Koudai Tsukakoshi finished third. In GT300, Kazuki Hoshino and Masataka Yanagida overhauled an 11-point deficit heading into the final round of the championship to claim the title for Hasemi Motorsport. Their final round win, coupled with finishes or lower than eighth place for Morio Nitta and Shinichi Takagi, and Ryo Orime and Nobuteru Taniguchi, gave them a championship-winning margin of nine points.

== Drivers and teams ==
=== GT500 ===
Team	Make	Car	Engine	#	Drivers	Tyre	Round
(Japan) Lexus Team Petronas TOM'S	Lexus	Lexus SC430 GT500	Lexus RV8 kg 3.4 L V8	1	(Japan) Juichi Wakisaka	B	All
(Japan) Lexus Team Petronas TOM'S	Lexus	Lexus SC430 GT500	Lexus RV8 kg 3.4 L V8	1	(Germany) André Lotterer	B	All
(Japan) Lexus Team LeMans ENEOS	Lexus	Lexus SC430 GT500	Lexus RV8 kg 3.4 L V8	6	(Japan) Daisuke Itō	B	All
(Japan) Lexus Team LeMans ENEOS	Lexus	Lexus SC430 GT500	Lexus RV8 kg 3.4 L V8	6	(Sweden) Björn Wirdheim	B	All
(Japan) Autobacs Racing Team Aguri	Honda	Honda HSV-010 GT	Honda HR10EG 3.4 L V8	8	(Republic of Ireland) Ralph Firman	B	All
(Japan) Autobacs Racing Team Aguri	Honda	Honda HSV-010 GT	Honda HR10EG 3.4 L V8	8	(Japan) Yuji Ide	B	All
(Japan) Autobacs Racing Team Aguri	Honda	Honda HSV-010 GT	Honda HR10EG 3.4 L V8	8	(Japan) Takashi Kobayashi	B	6
(Japan) Team Impul	Nissan	Nissan GT-R GT500	Nissan VRH34A 3.4 L V8	12	(Japan) Tsugio Matsuda	B	All
(Japan) Team Impul	Nissan	Nissan GT-R GT500	Nissan VRH34A 3.4 L V8	12	(Italy) Ronnie Quintarelli	B	All
(Japan) Keihin Real Racing	Honda	Honda HSV-010 GT	Honda HR10EG 3.4 L V8	17	(Japan) Toshihiro Kaneishi	B	All
(Japan) Keihin Real Racing	Honda	Honda HSV-010 GT	Honda HR10EG 3.4 L V8	17	(Japan) Koudai Tsukakoshi	B	All
(Japan) Weider Honda Racing	Honda	Honda HSV-010 GT	Honda HR10EG 3.4 L V8	18	(France) Loïc Duval	B	All
(Japan) Weider Honda Racing	Honda	Honda HSV-010 GT	Honda HR10EG 3.4 L V8	18	(Japan) Takashi Kogure	B	All
(Japan) Nismo	Nissan	Nissan GT-R GT500	Nissan VRH34A 3.4 L V8	23	(Japan) Satoshi Motoyama	M	All
(Japan) Nismo	Nissan	Nissan GT-R GT500	Nissan VRH34A 3.4 L V8	23	(France) Benoît Tréluyer	M	All
(Japan) Kondō Racing	Nissan	Nissan GT-R GT500	Nissan VRH34A 3.4 L V8	24	(Brazil) João Paulo de Oliveira	Y	All
(Japan) Kondō Racing	Nissan	Nissan GT-R GT500	Nissan VRH34A 3.4 L V8	24	(Japan) Hironobu Yasuda	Y	All
(Japan) Nakajima Racing	Honda	Honda HSV-010 GT	Honda HR10EG 3.4 L V8	32	(Japan) Ryō Michigami	D	All
(Japan) Nakajima Racing	Honda	Honda HSV-010 GT	Honda HR10EG 3.4 L V8	32	(Japan) Yuhki Nakayama	D	All
(Japan) Lexus Team Kraft	Lexus	Lexus SC430 GT500	Lexus RV8 kg 3.4 L V8	35	(Japan) Hiroaki Ishiura	B	All
(Japan) Lexus Team Kraft	Lexus	Lexus SC430 GT500	Lexus RV8 kg 3.4 L V8	35	(Japan) Kazuya Oshima	B	All
(Japan) Lexus Team ZENT Cerumo	Lexus	Lexus SC430 GT500	Lexus RV8 kg 3.4 L V8	38	(Japan) Yuji Tachikawa	B	All
(Japan) Lexus Team ZENT Cerumo	Lexus	Lexus SC430 GT500	Lexus RV8 kg 3.4 L V8	38	(United Kingdom) Richard Lyons	B	All
(Japan) Lexus Team SARD	Lexus	Lexus SC430 GT500	Lexus RV8 kg 3.4 L V8	39	(Japan) Kohei Hirate	D	All
(Japan) Lexus Team SARD	Lexus	Lexus SC430 GT500	Lexus RV8 kg 3.4 L V8	39	(Portugal) André Couto	D	1–7, NC
(Japan) Lexus Team SARD	Lexus	Lexus SC430 GT500	Lexus RV8 kg 3.4 L V8	39	(Netherlands) Carlo van Dam	D	8
(Japan) Team Kunimitsu	Honda	Honda HSV-010 GT	Honda HR10EG 3.4 L V8	100	(Japan) Takuya Izawa	B	All
(Japan) Team Kunimitsu	Honda	Honda HSV-010 GT	Honda HR10EG 3.4 L V8	100	(Japan) Naoki Yamamoto	B	All

=== GT300 ===
Team	Make	Car	Engine	#	Drivers	Tyre	Round
(Japan) Apple K-ONE Shiden	Mooncraft	Mooncraft Shiden	Toyota 1UZ-FE 4.4 L V8	2	(Japan) Hiroki Katoh	Y	All
(Japan) Apple K-ONE Shiden	Mooncraft	Mooncraft Shiden	Toyota 1UZ-FE 4.4 L V8	2	(Japan) Hiroshi Hamaguchi	Y	1–8
(Japan) Apple K-ONE Shiden	Mooncraft	Mooncraft Shiden	Toyota 1UZ-FE 4.4 L V8	2	(Japan) Kazuho Takahashi	Y	6, NC
(Japan) Hasemi Motorsport	Nissan	Nissan Fairlady Z	Nissan VQ35DE 3.5 L V6	3	(Japan) Kazuki Hoshino	Y	All
(Japan) Hasemi Motorsport	Nissan	Nissan Fairlady Z	Nissan VQ35DE 3.5 L V6	3	(Japan) Masataka Yanagida	Y	All
(Japan) Team Mach	Vemac	Vemac RD408R	Porsche M96/77 3.6 L F6	5	(Japan) Tetsuji Tamanaka	Y	All
(Japan) Team Mach	Vemac	Vemac RD408R	Porsche M96/77 3.6 L F6	5	(Japan) Haruki Kurosawa	Y	All
(Japan) RE Amemiya Racing	Mazda	Mazda RX-7	Mazda RE20B 2.0 L 3-rotor	7	(Japan) Ryo Orime	Y	All
(Japan) RE Amemiya Racing	Mazda	Mazda RX-7	Mazda RE20B 2.0 L 3-rotor	7	(Japan) Nobuteru Taniguchi	Y	All
(Japan) Goodsmile Racing with COX	Porsche	Porsche 996 GT3-RSR; Porsche 997 GT3-R	Porsche M96/73 3.6 L F6; Porsche M97/79 4.0 L F6	9	(Japan) Taku Bamba	H	1–3, 5–8
(Japan) Goodsmile Racing with COX	Porsche	Porsche 996 GT3-RSR; Porsche 997 GT3-R	Porsche M96/73 3.6 L F6; Porsche M97/79 4.0 L F6	9	(Japan) Masahiro Sasaki	H	1–3, 5–8, NC
(Japan) Goodsmile Racing with COX	Porsche	Porsche 996 GT3-RSR; Porsche 997 GT3-R	Porsche M96/73 3.6 L F6; Porsche M97/79 4.0 L F6	9	(Japan) Mitsuhiro Kinoshita	H	6
(Japan) Goodsmile Racing with COX	Porsche	Porsche 996 GT3-RSR; Porsche 997 GT3-R	Porsche M96/73 3.6 L F6; Porsche M97/79 4.0 L F6	9	(Japan) Hideto Yasuoka	H	NC
(Japan) Jim Gainer Racing	Ferrari	Ferrari F430	Ferrari F136GT 4.3 L V8	11	(Japan) Tetsuya Tanaka	D	All
(Japan) Jim Gainer Racing	Ferrari	Ferrari F430	Ferrari F136GT 4.3 L V8	11	(Japan) Katsuyuki Hiranaka	D	All
(Japan) Racing Project Bandoh	Lexus	Lexus IS350	Lexus RV8J 3.4 L V8	19	(Japan) Tatsuya Kataoka	Y	All
(Japan) Racing Project Bandoh	Lexus	Lexus IS350	Lexus RV8J 3.4 L V8	19	(Japan) Manabu Orido	Y	All
(Japan) Team RQS Motorsports	Vemac	Vemac RD350R	Zytek ZV348 4.0 L V8	22	(Japan) Hisashi Wada	Y	6–8
(Japan) Team RQS Motorsports	Vemac	Vemac RD350R	Zytek ZV348 4.0 L V8	22	(Japan) Masaki Jyonai	Y	6–8
(Japan) Team RQS Motorsports	Vemac	Vemac RD350R	Zytek ZV348 4.0 L V8	22	(Japan) Ryohei Sakaguchi	Y	6
(Japan) Samurai Team Tsuchiya	Porsche	Porsche 997 GT3-RSR	Porsche M97/81 4.0 L F6	25	(Japan) Akihiro Tsuzuki	Y	3, 5–8, NC
(Japan) Samurai Team Tsuchiya	Porsche	Porsche 997 GT3-RSR	Porsche M97/81 4.0 L F6	25	(Japan) Takeshi Tsuchiya	Y	3, 5–8, NC
(Japan) Samurai Team Tsuchiya	Porsche	Porsche 997 GT3-RSR	Porsche M97/81 4.0 L F6	25	(Japan) Yoshio Tsuzuki	Y	6
(Japan) Team Taisan	Porsche	Porsche 996 GT3-RS	Porsche M96/77 3.6 L F6	26	(Ukraine) Igor Sushko	Y	1–3, 5–7
(Japan) Team Taisan	Porsche	Porsche 996 GT3-RS	Porsche M96/77 3.6 L F6	26	(Japan) Masayuki Ueda	Y	1–3, 5–8, NC
(Japan) Team Taisan	Porsche	Porsche 996 GT3-RS	Porsche M96/77 3.6 L F6	26	(Japan) Shogo Mitsuyama	Y	6, 8, NC
(Japan) Team Taisan	Porsche	Porsche 996 GT3-RS	Porsche M96/77 3.6 L F6	51	(Japan) Yuya Sakamoto	Y	3, 5, 7–8, NC
(Japan) Team Taisan	Porsche	Porsche 996 GT3-RS	Porsche M96/77 3.6 L F6	51	(Japan) Shogo Mitsuyama	Y	3, 5, 7
(Japan) Team Taisan	Porsche	Porsche 996 GT3-RS	Porsche M96/77 3.6 L F6	51	(Japan) Hideki Yamauchi	Y	8, NC
(France) LMP Motorsport	Ferrari	Ferrari F430	Ferrari F136GT 4.3 L V8	27	(Japan) Yutaka Yamagishi	Y	All
(France) LMP Motorsport	Ferrari	Ferrari F430	Ferrari F136GT 4.3 L V8	27	(Japan) Hiroshi Koizumi	Y	All
(France) LMP Motorsport	Porsche	Porsche 996 GT3-RS	Porsche M96/73 3.6 L F6	28	(Japan) Akihiro Asai	Y	6–8
(France) LMP Motorsport	Porsche	Porsche 996 GT3-RS	Porsche M96/73 3.6 L F6	28	(Japan) Yuki Iwasaki	Y	6–8
(Japan) EVA Racing; Team apr	Toyota	Toyota Corolla Axio apr GT	Toyota 2GR-FSE 3.5 L V6	31	(Japan) Kosuke Matsuura	Y	All
(Japan) EVA Racing; Team apr	Toyota	Toyota Corolla Axio apr GT	Toyota 2GR-FSE 3.5 L V6	31	(Japan) Koki Saga	Y	All
(Japan) EVA Racing; Team apr	Toyota	Toyota Corolla Axio apr GT	Toyota 2GR-FSE 3.5 L V6	31	(Japan) Yuya Sakamoto	Y	6
(Japan) EVA Racing; Team apr	Toyota	Toyota Corolla Axio apr GT	Toyota 2GR-FSE 3.5 L V6	74	(Japan) Takuto Iguchi	M	All
(Japan) EVA Racing; Team apr	Toyota	Toyota Corolla Axio apr GT	Toyota 2GR-FSE 3.5 L V6	74	(Japan) Yuji Kunimoto	M	All
(Japan) Hankook KTR	Porsche	Porsche 997 GT3-RSR	Porsche M97/81 4.0 L F6	33	(Japan) Mitsuhiro Kinoshita	H	1–4
(Japan) Hankook KTR	Porsche	Porsche 997 GT3-RSR	Porsche M97/81 4.0 L F6	33	(Japan) Masami Kageyama	H	1–4, 7, NC
(Japan) Hankook KTR	Porsche	Porsche 997 GT3-RSR	Porsche M97/81 4.0 L F6	33	(Japan) Tomonobu Fujii	H	3, 7, NC
(Japan) Autobacs Racing Team Aguri	ASL	ASL ARTA Garaiya	Nissan VQ35DE 3.5 L V6	43	(Japan) Morio Nitta	M	All
(Japan) Autobacs Racing Team Aguri	ASL	ASL ARTA Garaiya	Nissan VQ35DE 3.5 L V6	43	(Japan) Shinichi Takagi	M	All
(Japan) Autobacs Racing Team Aguri	ASL	ASL ARTA Garaiya	Nissan VQ35DE 3.5 L V6	43	(Japan) Kyosuke Mineo	M	6
(Japan) MOLA	Nissan	Nissan Fairlady Z	Nissan VQ35DE 3.5 L V6	46	(Japan) Tsubasa Abe	Y	All
(Japan) MOLA	Nissan	Nissan Fairlady Z	Nissan VQ35DE 3.5 L V6	46	(Japan) Naoki Yokomizo	Y	All
(Japan) R&D Sport	Subaru	Subaru Legacy B4	Subaru EJ20 2.0 L Turbo F4	62	(Japan) Kota Sasaki	Y	1–3, 5–8, NC
(Japan) R&D Sport	Subaru	Subaru Legacy B4	Subaru EJ20 2.0 L Turbo F4	62	(Japan) Tetsuya Yamano	Y	1–3, 5–8, NC
(Japan) A speed	Aston Martin	Aston Martin V8 Vantage GT2	Aston Martin AJ37 4.7 L V8	66	(Japan) Hideshi Matsuda	Y	All
(Japan) A speed	Aston Martin	Aston Martin V8 Vantage GT2	Aston Martin AJ37 4.7 L V8	66	(Japan) Hiroki Yoshimoto	Y	All
(Japan) A speed	Aston Martin	Aston Martin V8 Vantage GT2	Aston Martin AJ37 4.7 L V8	66	(Japan) Tomonobu Fujii	Y	6
(Japan) JLOC	Lamborghini	Lamborghini Gallardo RG-3	Lamborghini 07L1 5.2 L V10	86	(Japan) Yuhi Sekiguchi	Y	All
(Japan) JLOC	Lamborghini	Lamborghini Gallardo RG-3	Lamborghini 07L1 5.2 L V10	86	(Japan) Koji Yamanishi	Y	All
(Japan) JLOC	Lamborghini	Lamborghini Gallardo RG-3	Lamborghini 07L1 5.2 L V10	87	(Japan) Hiroyuki Iiri	Y	All
(Japan) JLOC	Lamborghini	Lamborghini Gallardo RG-3	Lamborghini 07L1 5.2 L V10	87	(Japan) Yuya Sakamoto	Y	All
(Japan) JLOC	Lamborghini	Lamborghini Gallardo RG-3	Lamborghini 07L1 5.2 L V10	87	(Japan) Naohiro Furuya	Y	6
(Japan) JLOC	Lamborghini	Lamborghini Gallardo RG-3	Lamborghini 07L1 5.2 L V10	88	(Japan) Shinya Hosokawa	Y	1–7
(Japan) JLOC	Lamborghini	Lamborghini Gallardo RG-3	Lamborghini 07L1 5.2 L V10	88	(Japan) Atsushi Yogo	Y	All
(Japan) JLOC	Lamborghini	Lamborghini Gallardo RG-3	Lamborghini 07L1 5.2 L V10	88	(Japan) Tsubasa Kurosawa	Y	8, NC
(Japan) Tomei Sports	Porsche	Porsche 996 GT3-RSR	Porsche M96/73 3.6 L F6	360	(Japan) Keita Sawa	Y	1
(Japan) Tomei Sports	Porsche	Porsche 996 GT3-RSR	Porsche M96/73 3.6 L F6	360	(Japan) Takamori.com	Y	1
(Japan) Tomei Sports	Porsche	Porsche 996 GT3-RSR	Porsche M96/73 3.6 L F6	360	(Japan) Masahiro Matsunaga	Y	3–5, 7–8
(Japan) Tomei Sports	Porsche	Porsche 996 GT3-RSR	Porsche M96/73 3.6 L F6	360	(Japan) Atsushi Tanaka	Y	3–5, 7–8
(Singapore) 365 Thunder Asia Racing	Mosler	Mosler MT900M	Judd XV675 3.4 L V8	365	(Singapore) Melvin Choo	Y	2–8, NC
(Singapore) 365 Thunder Asia Racing	Mosler	Mosler MT900M	Judd XV675 3.4 L V8	365	(United Kingdom) Tim Sugden	Y	2–5, 7
(Singapore) 365 Thunder Asia Racing	Mosler	Mosler MT900M	Judd XV675 3.4 L V8	365	(Japan) Shinsuke Yamazaki	Y	6
(Singapore) 365 Thunder Asia Racing	Mosler	Mosler MT900M	Judd XV675 3.4 L V8	365	(Japan) Keita Sawa	Y	6, NC
(Japan) Bomex Rosso	Porsche	Porsche Boxster	Porsche M96/77 3.6 L F6	666	(Japan) Junichiro Yamashita	Y	1, 3–8
(Japan) Bomex Rosso	Porsche	Porsche Boxster	Porsche M96/77 3.6 L F6	666	(Japan) Takashi Miyamoto	Y	1, 3
(Japan) Bomex Rosso	Porsche	Porsche Boxster	Porsche M96/77 3.6 L F6	666	(Japan) Takamori.com	Y	3–8
(Japan) Bomex Rosso	Porsche	Porsche Boxster	Porsche M96/77 3.6 L F6	666	(Japan) Satoshi Kimura	Y	6

- Goodsmile Racing with COX (#9) announced a mid-season car change that will occur at the fifth round. The Porsche 996 GT3-RSR was retired after the third round.
- Team apr changed the name on one of their cars midway through the season, as a promotion towards the movie adaption of animation series Neon Genesis Evangelion. Thus the #31 car runs under the "Eva Racing" banner since the third round, with the exception of the fourth round due to a copyright issue, with the #74 remaining unchanged.

=== Car changes ===
==== GT500 ====
- Honda: Having used the NSX since 1996, Honda replaced the unique MR-layout model with a FMR-layout prototype HSV-010, which has been homologated by the JAF. However, Honda have cancelled their plans to produce a road-going model of the HSV-010.
- All three teams united their engine specification to 3.4 L V8 with an FR-layout vehicle which was planned to be done last season (only Lexus have made such changes last season).

==== GT300 ====
- Hasemi Motorsport moved into the class from GT500, competing with a Nissan Fairlady Z.
- The JLOC team which previously used a Lamborghini Murciélago, have changed all their cars to Lamborghini Gallardos.
- A speed, a new team participating in Super GT, uses an Aston Martin V8 Vantage.
- Thunder Asia Racing, which raced in Malaysia last year, became the first team not based in Japan to participate in the full season in Super GT history. They use a Mosler MT900M, and in addition, Melvin Choo, one of the team's drivers, was appointed as the Super GT official negotiator to help bring a race to Singapore in future.
- Studie, which used a BMW Z4 in the 2008 and 2009 seasons, had originally planned to participate the series as AS Studie Racing in 2010, but did not participate due to the withdrawal of Advance Step. Advance Step had been a co-partner for Studie over the previous two seasons. However at the end of the season, the teams parted ways and will compete separately in 2011.
- Good Smile Racing made their debut in the series after becoming the primary sponsors for Studie under the Hatsune Miku banner in the past two seasons. Team COX, the first Porsche works team in Super GT, would become Good Smile Racing's partner. The team originally planned to use a 2010-specification Porsche 997 GT3-R for the entire season. However, as the car was delivered in late May, the team used a Porsche 996 RSR for the first three races of the season. They will also miss the event in Sepang, to test the new vehicle. Porsche and COX also announced that they are planning to supply at least one more GT3-R to other teams participating in 2011.
- RE Amemiya Racing announced it will be the final season of the Mazda RX-7, as after the season ends, the car will be donated to the motor racing museum of Malaysia. They would later announce their withdrawal from the series.
- R&D Sport have changed the drivetrain on their Subaru Legacy from AWD to RWD, making AWD cars absent.

==== Others ====
- The use of a three-way catalytic converter is compulsory for all teams.

== Schedule ==
- The calendar was provisionally announced on September 25, 2009. Autopolis has been removed from the calendar, with no replacement round nor venue added. However, with alterations made to the 2010 Formula One calendar, including the moving of the Japanese Grand Prix, the calendar was altered on October 19, 2009.
- Apart from the eight championship rounds, a non-championship round, originally entitled Super GT and Formula Nippon Sprint Cup 2010, will be held at the conclusion of the season. After the Japan Automobile Federation recognised the race as a "JAF Grand Prix" round, it was renamed as JAF Grand Prix Super GT and Formula Nippon Sprint Cup 2010.
- The 400 km race at Fuji will adopt regulations with two mandatory pit stops, while the knockout qualifying format was used in the first two rounds as well as the Suzuka 700 km of the season.
- The 300 km race at Fuji scheduled to be held on September 12 was cancelled due to the serious damage to Oyama, the town where the circuit is located, caused by the typhoon Malou. This is the first event in Super GT to be cancelled by series organisers, and the first Japanese Grand touring round to be cancelled since Sepang in 2003.

Round	Race	Circuit	Date	Pole position	Fastest lap	Winner
1	Suzuka GT 300 km Report	(Japan) Suzuka Circuit	March 21	#18 Weider Honda Racing	#18 Weider Honda Racing	#24 Kondō Racing
1	Suzuka GT 300 km Report	(Japan) Suzuka Circuit	March 21	(France) Loïc Duval (Japan) Takashi Kogure	(France) Loïc Duval (Japan) Takashi Kogure	(Brazil) João Paulo de Oliveira (Japan) Hironobu Yasuda
1	Suzuka GT 300 km Report	(Japan) Suzuka Circuit	March 21	#7 RE Amemiya Racing	#5 Team Mach	#7 RE Amemiya Racing
1	Suzuka GT 300 km Report	(Japan) Suzuka Circuit	March 21	(Japan) Nobuteru Taniguchi (Japan) Ryo Orime	(Japan) Haruki Kurosawa (Japan) Tetsuji Tamanaka	(Japan) Nobuteru Taniguchi (Japan) Ryo Orime
2	Okayama GT 300 km Report	(Japan) Okayama International Circuit	April 4	#18 Weider Honda Racing	#18 Weider Honda Racing	#18 Weider Honda Racing
2	Okayama GT 300 km Report	(Japan) Okayama International Circuit	April 4	(France) Loïc Duval (Japan) Takashi Kogure	(France) Loïc Duval (Japan) Takashi Kogure	(France) Loïc Duval (Japan) Takashi Kogure
2	Okayama GT 300 km Report	(Japan) Okayama International Circuit	April 4	#86 JLOC	#46 MOLA	#2 Apple K-ONE Shiden
2	Okayama GT 300 km Report	(Japan) Okayama International Circuit	April 4	(Japan) Koji Yamanishi (Japan) Yuhi Sekiguchi	(Japan) Naoki Yokomizo (Japan) Tsubasa Abe	(Japan) Hiroki Katoh (Japan) Hiroshi Hamaguchi
3	Fuji GT 400 km Report	(Japan) Fuji Speedway	May 2	#35 Lexus Team Kraft	#35 Lexus Team Kraft	#35 Lexus Team Kraft
3	Fuji GT 400 km Report	(Japan) Fuji Speedway	May 2	(Japan) Hiroaki Ishiura (Japan) Kazuya Oshima	(Japan) Hiroaki Ishiura (Japan) Kazuya Oshima	(Japan) Hiroaki Ishiura (Japan) Kazuya Oshima
3	Fuji GT 400 km Report	(Japan) Fuji Speedway	May 2	#33 Hankook KTR	#74 Team apr	#74 Team apr
3	Fuji GT 400 km Report	(Japan) Fuji Speedway	May 2	(Japan) Mitsuhiro Kinoshita (Japan) Masami Kageyama	(Japan) Takuto Iguchi (Japan) Yuji Kunimoto	(Japan) Takuto Iguchi (Japan) Yuji Kunimoto
4	Super GT International Series Malaysia; Report	(Malaysia) Sepang International Circuit	June 20	#12 Team Impul	#23 Motul Autech	#12 Team Impul
4	Super GT International Series Malaysia; Report	(Malaysia) Sepang International Circuit	June 20	(Japan) Tsugio Matsuda (Italy) Ronnie Quintarelli	(Japan) Satoshi Motoyama (France) Benoît Tréluyer	(Japan) Tsugio Matsuda (Italy) Ronnie Quintarelli
4	Super GT International Series Malaysia; Report	(Malaysia) Sepang International Circuit	June 20	#11 Jim Gainer Racing	#3 Hasemi Motorsport Z	#7 RE Amemiya Racing
4	Super GT International Series Malaysia; Report	(Malaysia) Sepang International Circuit	June 20	(Japan) Tetsuya Tanaka (Japan) Katsuyuki Hiranaka	(Japan) Kazuki Hoshino (Japan) Masataka Yanagida	(Japan) Nobuteru Taniguchi (Japan) Ryo Orime
5	Sugo GT 300 km Report	(Japan) Sportsland SUGO	July 25	#23 Motul Autech	#23 Motul Autech	#17 Keihin Real Racing
5	Sugo GT 300 km Report	(Japan) Sportsland SUGO	July 25	(Japan) Satoshi Motoyama (France) Benoît Tréluyer	(Japan) Satoshi Motoyama (France) Benoît Tréluyer	(Japan) Toshihiro Kaneishi (Japan) Koudai Tsukakoshi
5	Sugo GT 300 km Report	(Japan) Sportsland SUGO	July 25	#2 Apple K-ONE Shiden	#2 Apple K-ONE Shiden	#2 Apple K-ONE Shiden
5	Sugo GT 300 km Report	(Japan) Sportsland SUGO	July 25	(Japan) Hiroshi Hamaguchi (Japan) Hiroki Katoh	(Japan) Hiroshi Hamaguchi (Japan) Hiroki Katoh	(Japan) Hiroshi Hamaguchi (Japan) Hiroki Katoh
6	39th Pokka GT Summer Special; Report	(Japan) Suzuka Circuit	August 22	#8 Autobacs Racing Team Aguri	#23 Motul Autech	#8 Autobacs Racing Team Aguri
6	39th Pokka GT Summer Special; Report	(Japan) Suzuka Circuit	August 22	(Republic of Ireland) Ralph Firman (Japan) Yuji Ide (Japan) Takashi Kobayashi	(Japan) Satoshi Motoyama (France) Benoît Tréluyer	(Republic of Ireland) Ralph Firman (Japan) Yuji Ide (Japan) Takashi Kobayashi
6	39th Pokka GT Summer Special; Report	(Japan) Suzuka Circuit	August 22	#26 Team Taisan	#62 R&D Sport	#62 R&D Sport
6	39th Pokka GT Summer Special; Report	(Japan) Suzuka Circuit	August 22	(Ukraine) Igor Sushko (Japan) Masayuki Ueda (Japan) Shogo Mitsuyama	(Japan) Tetsuya Yamano (Japan) Kota Sasaki	(Japan) Tetsuya Yamano (Japan) Kota Sasaki
7	Fuji GT 300 km	(Japan) Fuji Speedway	September 12	Cancelled		
8	Motegi GT 250 km Report	(Japan) Twin Ring Motegi	October 24	#18 Weider Honda Racing	#18 Weider Honda Racing	#1 Lexus Team Petronas TOM'S
8	Motegi GT 250 km Report	(Japan) Twin Ring Motegi	October 24	(France) Loïc Duval (Japan) Takashi Kogure	(France) Loïc Duval (Japan) Takashi Kogure	(Japan) Juichi Wakisaka (Germany) André Lotterer
8	Motegi GT 250 km Report	(Japan) Twin Ring Motegi	October 24	#3 Hasemi Motorsport Z	#74 Team apr	#3 Hasemi Motorsport Z
8	Motegi GT 250 km Report	(Japan) Twin Ring Motegi	October 24	(Japan) Kazuki Hoshino (Japan) Masataka Yanagida	(Japan) Takuto Iguchi (Japan) Yuji Kunimoto	(Japan) Kazuki Hoshino (Japan) Masataka Yanagida
NC	All Star Series; Report	(Japan) Fuji Speedway	November 13	#38 Lexus Team ZENT Cerumo	#6 Lexus Team LeMans ENEOS	#38 Lexus Team ZENT Cerumo
NC	All Star Series; Report	(Japan) Fuji Speedway	November 13	(United Kingdom) Richard Lyons	(Sweden) Björn Wirdheim	(United Kingdom) Richard Lyons
NC	All Star Series; Report	(Japan) Fuji Speedway	November 13	#43 ASL	#11 Jim Gainer Racing	#11 Jim Gainer Racing
NC	All Star Series; Report	(Japan) Fuji Speedway	November 13	(Japan) Shinichi Takagi	(Japan) Katsuyuki Hiranaka	(Japan) Katsuyuki Hiranaka
NC	All Star Series; Report	(Japan) Fuji Speedway	November 14	#12 Team Impul	#6 Lexus Team LeMans ENEOS	#6 Lexus Team LeMans ENEOS
NC	All Star Series; Report	(Japan) Fuji Speedway	November 14	(Japan) Tsugio Matsuda	(Japan) Daisuke Itō	(Japan) Daisuke Itō
NC	All Star Series; Report	(Japan) Fuji Speedway	November 14	#43 ASL	#5 Team Mach	#11 Jim Gainer Racing
NC	All Star Series; Report	(Japan) Fuji Speedway	November 14	(Japan) Morio Nitta	(Japan) Haruki Kurosawa	(Japan) Tetsuya Tanaka

== Standings ==
=== GT500 Drivers ===
Scoring system

Position	1st	2nd	3rd	4th	5th	6th	7th	8th	9th	10th
Points	20	15	11	8	6	5	4	3	2	1

Rank	Driver	No.	SUZ (Japan)	OKA (Japan)	FUJ (Japan)	SEP (Malaysia)	SUG (Japan)	SUZ (Japan)	FUJ (Japan)	MOT (Japan)	Pts.
1	(Japan) Takashi Kogure (France) Loïc Duval	18	Ret	1	7	3	2	9	C	2	67
2	(Japan) Juichi Wakisaka (Germany) André Lotterer	1	4	3	2	8	7	10	C	1	62
3	(Japan) Toshihiro Kaneishi (Japan) Koudai Tsukakoshi	17	7	7	5	12	1	4	C	3	53
4	(Japan) Daisuke Ito (Sweden) Björn Wirdheim	6	2	5	3	4	3	11	C	12	51
5	(Japan) Tsugio Matsuda (Italy) Ronnie Quintarelli	12	Ret	4	6	1	4	12	C	5	47
6	(Japan) Hiroaki Ishiura (Japan) Kazuya Oshima	35	6	9	1	7	Ret	5	C	4	45
7	(Japan) Satoshi Motoyama (France) Benoît Tréluyer	23	8	Ret	Ret	2	6	2	C	8	41
8	(Japan) Naoki Yamamoto (Japan) Takuya Izawa	100	3	8	10	5	8	3	C	6	40
9	(Japan) Yuji Tachikawa (United Kingdom) Richard Lyons	38	9	2	4	6	9	6	C	Ret	37
10	(Brazil) João Paulo de Oliveira (Japan) Hironobu Yasuda	24	1	12	8	9	5	Ret	C	10	32
11	(Republic of Ireland) Ralph Firman (Japan) Yuji Ide	8	Ret	6	11	11	12	1	C	7	29
12	(Japan) Kohei Hirate	39	5	10	Ret	10	10	8	C	11	12
13	(Portugal) Andre Couto	39	5	10	Ret	10	10	8	C		12
14	(Japan) Ryō Michigami (Japan) Yuhki Nakayama	32	10	11	9	Ret	11	7	C	9	9
-	(Netherlands) Carlo van Dam	39								11	0
-	(Japan) Takashi Kobayashi	8						1			0
Rank	Driver	No.	SUZ (Japan)	OKA (Japan)	FUJ (Japan)	SEP (Malaysia)	SUG (Japan)	SUZ (Japan)	FUJ (Japan)	MOT (Japan)	Pts.

Colour	Result
Gold	Winner
Silver	Second place
Bronze	Third place
Green	Points classification
Blue	Non-points classification
Blue	Non-classified finish (NC)
Purple	Retired, not classified (Ret)
Red	Did not qualify (DNQ)
Red	Did not pre-qualify (DNPQ)
Black	Disqualified (DSQ)
White	Did not start (DNS)
White	Withdrew (WD)
White	Race cancelled (C)
Blank	Did not practice (DNP)
Blank	Did not arrive (DNA)
Blank	Excluded (EX)

==== Teams' standings ====
Rank	Team	No.	SUZ (Japan)	OKA (Japan)	FUJ (Japan)	SEP (Malaysia)	SUG (Japan)	SUZ (Japan)	FUJ (Japan)	MOT (Japan)	FUJ (Japan)	FUJ (Japan)	Pts.
1	Weider Honda Racing	18	Ret	1	7	3	2	9	C	2	7	3	84
2	Lexus Team Petronas TOM'S	1	4	3	2	8	7	10	C	1	13	7	82
3	Keihin Real Racing	17	7	7	5	12	1	4	C	3	2	12	72
4	Lexus Team LeMans ENEOS	6	2	5	3	4	3	11	C	12	11	1	70
5	Team Impul	12	Ret	4	6	1	4	12	C	5	3	5	63
6	Lexus Team Kraft	35	6	9	1	7	Ret	5	C	4	8	2	62
7	Team Kunimitsu	100	3	8	10	5	8	3	C	6	12	9	60
8	Nismo	23	8	Ret	Ret	2	6	2	C	8	5	6	56
9	Lexus Team ZENT Cerumo	38	9	2	4	6	9	6	C	Ret	1	13	52
10	Kondo Racing	24	1	12	8	9	5	Ret	C	10	4	10	48
11	Autobacs Racing Team Aguri	8	Ret	6	11	11	12	1	C	7	9	11	42
12	Lexus Team SARD	39	5	10	Ret	10	10	8	C	11	10	8	26
13	Nakajima Racing	32	10	11	9	Ret	11	7	C	9	6	4	21
Rank	Team	No.	SUZ (Japan)	OKA (Japan)	FUJ (Japan)	SEP (Malaysia)	SUG (Japan)	SUZ (Japan)	FUJ (Japan)	MOT (Japan)	FUJ (Japan)	FUJ (Japan)	Pts.

=== GT300 Drivers ===
Scoring system

Position	1st	2nd	3rd	4th	5th	6th	7th	8th	9th	10th
Points	20	15	11	8	6	5	4	3	2	1

Rank	Driver	No.	SUZ (Japan)	OKA (Japan)	FUJ (Japan)	SEP (Malaysia)	SUG (Japan)	SUZ (Japan)	FUJ (Japan)	MOT (Japan)	Pts.
1	(Japan) Masataka Yanagida (Japan) Kazuki Hoshino	3	5	3	5	5	2	Ret	C	1	64
2	(Japan) Morio Nitta (Japan) Shinichi Takagi	43	Ret	6	2	2	6	2	C	12	55
3	(Japan) Ryo Orime (Japan) Nobuteru Taniguchi	7	1	18	11	1	7	6	C	8	49
4	(Japan) Hiroki Katoh (Japan) Hiroshi Hamaguchi	2	Ret	2	13	Ret	1	18	C	2	50
5	(Japan) Takuto Iguchi (Japan) Yuji Kunimoto	74	8	9	1	3	Ret	3	C	17	47
6	(Japan) Naoki Yokomizo (Japan) Tsubasa Abe	46	2	1	12	6	8	16	C	14	43
7	(Japan) Tetsuya Tanaka (Japan) Katsuyuki Hiranaka	11	Ret	7	6	4	5	8	C	4	34
8	(Japan) Tatsuya Kataoka (Japan) Manabu Orido	19	3	14	4	9	Ret	4	C	7	33
9	(Japan) Koji Yamanishi (Japan) Yuhi Sekiguchi	86	7	4	16	15	10	5	C	3	30
10	(Japan) Koki Saga (Japan) Kousuke Matsuura	31	Ret	5	9	8	3	Ret	C	19	22
11	(Japan) Kota Sasaki (Japan) Tetsuya Yamano	62	13	12	Ret		13	1	C	10	21
12	(Japan) Tetsuji Tamanaka (Japan) Haruki Kurosawa	5	4	Ret	18	13	9	9	C	5	18
13	(Japan) Takeshi Tsuchiya (Japan) Akihiro Tsuzuki	25			7		4	Ret	C	6	17
14	(Japan) Hideshi Matsuda (Japan) Hiroki Yoshimoto	66	DSQ	15	3	12	11	Ret	C	23	11
15	(Japan) Yutaka Yamagishi (Japan) Hiroshi Koizumi	27	9	11	8	10	DSQ	7	C	13	10
16	(Japan) Mitsuhiro Kinoshita	33/9	6	8	Ret	16		10	C		8
17	(Japan) Masami Kageyama	33	6	8	Ret	16			C		8
18	(Japan) Atsushi Yogo	88	DNQ	16	17	7	14	15	C	Ret	4
19	(Japan) Shinya Hosokawa	88	DNQ	16	17	7	14	15	C		4
20	(Japan) Taku Bamba (Japan) Masahiro Sasaki	9	12	10	14		12	10	C	9	4
21	(Japan) Hiroyuki Iiri (Japan) Yuya Sakamoto	87	10	17	15	11	17	12	C	20	1
22	(Japan) Masayuki Ueda	26	11	13	10		18	Ret	C	11	1
23	(Ukraine) Igor Sushko	26	11	13	10		18	Ret	C		1
-	(Japan) Kyosuke Mineo	43						2	C		0
-	(Japan) Akihiro Asai (Japan) Yuki Iwasaki	28						11	C	15	0
-	(Japan) Shogo Mitsuyama	51/26			20		15	Ret	C	11	0
-	(Japan) Naohiro Furuya	87						12	C		0
-	(Japan) Hisashi Wada (Japan) Masaki Jyonai	22						13	C	18	0
-	(Japan) Ryohei Sakaguchi	22						13	C		0
-	(Japan) Junichiro Yamashita	666	14		19	Ret	19	17	C	21	0
-	(Japan) Takashi Miyamoto	666	14		19				C		0
-	(Japan) Masahiro Matsunaga (Japan) Atsushi Tanaka	360			Ret	14	16		C	22	0
-	(Singapore) Melvin Choo	365		Ret	Ret	Ret	Ret	14	C		0
-	(Japan) Keita Sawa	360/365	WD		WD			14	C		0
-	(Japan) Shinsuke Yamazaki	365						14	C		0
-	(Japan) Yuya Sakamoto	51/31			20		15	Ret	C	16	0
-	(Japan) Hideki Yamauchi	51							C	16	0
-	(Japan) Takamori.com	360/666	WD		19	Ret	19	17	C	21	0
-	(Japan) Satoshi Kimura	666						17	C		0
-	(Japan) Kazuho Takahashi	2						18	C		0
-	(United Kingdom) Tim Sugden	365		Ret	Ret	Ret	Ret		C		0
-	(Japan) Tomonobu Fujii	33/66			Ret			Ret	C		0
-	(Japan) Yoshio Tsuzuki	25						Ret	C		0
-	(Japan) Tsubasa Kurosawa	88							C	Ret	0
Rank	Driver	No.	SUZ (Japan)	OKA (Japan)	FUJ (Japan)	SEP (Malaysia)	SUG (Japan)	SUZ (Japan)	FUJ (Japan)	MOT (Japan)	Pts.

Colour	Result
Gold	Winner
Silver	Second place
Bronze	Third place
Green	Points classification
Blue	Non-points classification
Blue	Non-classified finish (NC)
Purple	Retired, not classified (Ret)
Red	Did not qualify (DNQ)
Red	Did not pre-qualify (DNPQ)
Black	Disqualified (DSQ)
White	Did not start (DNS)
White	Withdrew (WD)
White	Race cancelled (C)
Blank	Did not practice (DNP)
Blank	Did not arrive (DNA)
Blank	Excluded (EX)

==== GT300 Teams' standings ====
Rank	Team	No.	SUZ (Japan)	OKA (Japan)	FUJ (Japan)	SEP (Malaysia)	SUG (Japan)	SUZ (Japan)	FUJ (Japan)	MOT (Japan)	FUJ (Japan)	FUJ (Japan)	Pts.
1	Hasemi Motorsport	3	5	3	5	5	2	Ret	C	1	5	2	82
2	Autobacs Racing Team Aguri	43	Ret	6	2	2	6	2	C	12	7	13	73
3	M7 RE Amemiya Racing	7	1	18	11	1	7	6	C	8	4	6	71
4	apr	74	8	9	1	3	Ret	3	C	17	2	7	65
5	Cars Tokai Dream28	2	Ret	2	13	Ret	1	18	C	2	19	5	63
6	MOLA	46	2	1	12	6	8	16	C	14	9	3	62
7	Jim Gainer	11	Ret	7	6	4	5	8	C	4	1	1	52
8	Racing Project Bandoh	19	3	14	4	9	Ret	4	C	7	10	12	49
9	JLOC	86	7	4	16	15	10	5	C	3	Ret	14	47
10	EVA Racing apr	31	Ret	5	9	8	3	Ret	C	19	12	Ret	35
11	R&D Sport	62	13	12	Ret		13	1	C	10	17	15	30
12	Team Mach	5	4	Ret	18	13	9	9	C	5	15	10	28
13	LMP Motorsport	27	9	11	8	10	DSQ	7	C	13	16	9	26
14	Samurai Team Tsuchiya	25			7		4	Ret	C	6	20	4	26
15	A speed	66	DSQ	15	3	12	11	Ret	C	23	13	17	20
16	Goodsmile Racing with COX	9	12	10	14		12	10	C	9	21	WD	16
17	Hankook KTR	33	6	8	Ret	16			C		3	Ret	15
18	JLOC	87	10	17	15	11	17	12	C	20	6	11	14
19	JLOC	88	DNQ	16	17	7	14	15	C	Ret	11	16	13
20	Team Taisan	26	11	13	10		18	Ret	C	11	14	Ret	12
21	Bomex Rosso	666	14		19	Ret	19	17	C	21			5
22	Team Taisan	51			20		15		C	16	8	8	5
23	LMP Motorsport	28						11	C	15			4
24	Tomei Sports	360			Ret	14	16		C	22			3
25	Team RQS Motorsports	22						13	C	18			2
26	Thunder Asia Racing	365		Ret	Ret	Ret	Ret	14	C		18	18	1
Rank	Team	No.	SUZ (Japan)	OKA (Japan)	FUJ (Japan)	SEP (Malaysia)	SUG (Japan)	SUZ (Japan)	FUJ (Japan)	MOT (Japan)	FUJ (Japan)	FUJ (Japan)	Pts.
