= Honda HSV-010 GT =

Racing car model

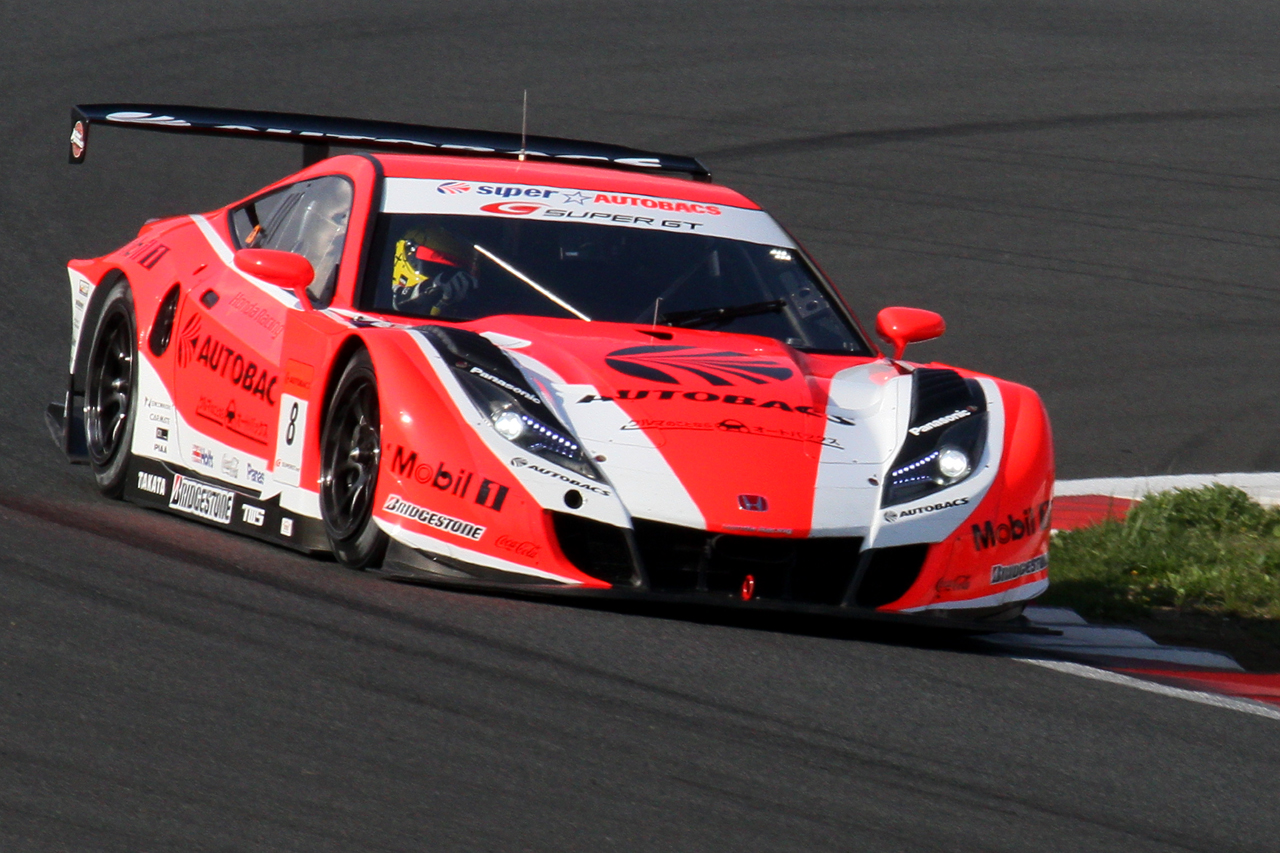
- The HSV-010 GT of Autobacs Racing Team Aguri, who won the 1000km Suzuka in 2010.
- Category: Super GT GT500
- Constructor: Honda
- Designer: Keinosuke Taki (Development Project Leader)
- Predecessor: Honda NSX-GT
- Successor: Honda NSX CONCEPT-GT / Honda NSX-GT

Technical specifications
- Length: 4,675 mm (184.1 in)
- Width: 2,000 mm (79 in)
- Wheelbase: 2,700 mm (110 in)
- Engine: 3.4 L Honda HR10EG 3,397 cc (207.3 cu in) V8, 40.0kgm (289 lb ft; 392 Nm), front mid-engine, rear-wheel drive
- Transmission: Ricardo 6-speed sequential manual
- Power: 500 PS (370 kW; 490 bhp)
- Weight: 1,100 kg (2,400 lb)
- Tyres: Bridgestone; Michelin

Competition history
- Notable entrants: (Japan) Autobacs Racing Team Aguri (Japan) Keihin Real Racing (Japan) Nakajima Racing (Japan) Team Kunimitsu (Japan) Weider Honda Racing
- Notable drivers: (France) Loïc Duval (Republic of Ireland) Ralph Firman (Japan) Yuji Ide (Japan) Takuya Izawa (Japan) Toshihiro Kaneishi (Japan) Takashi Kobayashi (Japan) Takashi Kogure (France) Frédéric Makowiecki (Japan) Kosuke Matsuura (Japan) Ryo Michigami (Japan) Hideki Mutoh (Japan) Daisuke Nakajima (Japan) Yuhki Nakayama (Japan) Koudai Tsukakoshi (Netherlands) Carlo van Dam (Japan) Naoki Yamamoto
- Debut: 2010 Suzuka GT 300km
- First win: 2010 Okayama GT 300km
- Last win: 2013 JAF Grand Prix Race 1
- Last event: 2013 JAF Grand Prix
Races	Wins	Poles	Titles
37	10	8	2
- Teams' Championships: 1 (Weider Honda Racing, 2010)
- Drivers' Championships: 1 (Takashi Kogure & Loïc Duval, 2010)

The Honda HSV-010 GT (an abbreviation for Honda Sports Velocity) is a grand touring race car manufactured and designed by Honda. The HSV-010 GT served as the successor to the first generation Honda NSX-GT and competed in the Japanese Super GT racing series, where it raced from 2010 to 2013.

== Car development ==
On October 23, 2009, Honda officially announced the end of the mid-engine NSX-GT's participation in Super GT racing, as it was only allowed to participate as an exception in the 2009 season. In principle, Super GT's 2009 regulations allowed the use of only front-engine rear-drive cars, and Honda did not have a FR successor car ready due to the economic environment at the time.

On November 15, 2009, Honda announced that, despite withdrawing the NSX from Super GT competition, it would campaign a car for the 2010 season. Honda revealed that the car would be based on the cancelled "New NSX" production vehicle. Unlike typical Super GT cars, the vehicle is not based on any production vehicle that is made available to purchase by the general public. It is reported that although the Super GT normally requires racing vehicles to be based on production cars, the use of a production-ready car is also allowed. The 3.4 L (210 cu in) HR10EG V8 engine was based on the HR09E built for Formula Nippon. On December 22, 2009, Honda announced the HSV-010 GT as the successor to the NSX Super GT in the Super GT series.

== Motorsport history ==
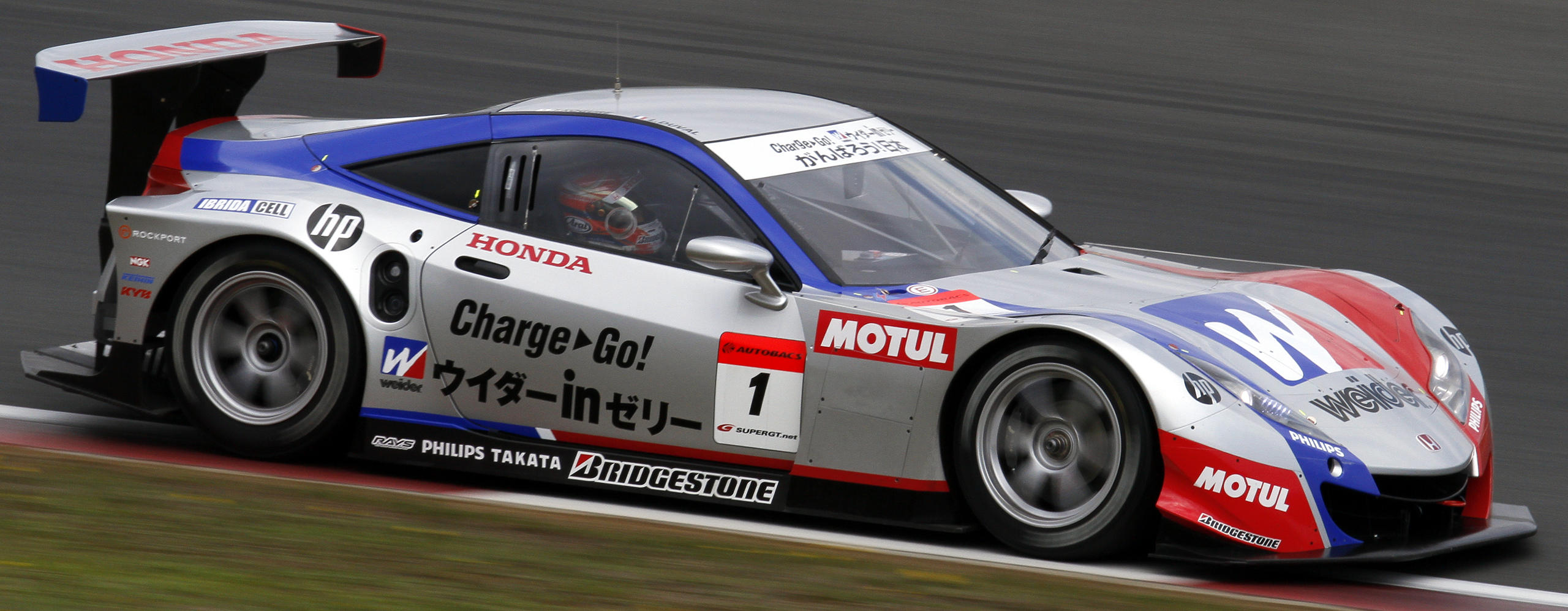
Weider Honda Racing's 2011 Honda HSV-010 GT during a test at Fuji Speedway.

The Honda HSV-010 GT officially debuted in the 2010 Super GT Series with five GT500 entries from Weider Honda Racing, Autobacs Racing Team Aguri, Keihin Real Racing, Nakajima Racing, and Team Kunimitsu. Weider Honda Racing won the teams' championship, with Takashi Kogure and Loïc Duval winning the drivers' championship.

For the 2011 season, the HSV-010 GT's radiator was divided in two and relocated to the sides of the car, with the goal of quicker cornering via a reduced moment of inertia with respect to yaw. However, in doing so, the centre of mass was raised, and configuration and adjustment became a more difficult and time-consuming task.

For the 2013 season, the last season under 2009 regulations, the radiator was moved back to the front of the car with lightened equipment. Instead, a shorter exhaust system with exhaust exits on both sides was used, allowing the V8 engine to rev higher. The HSV-010 GT's overall potential was improved, with the #17 Keihin HSV-010 placing second overall in the Teams' Championship.

The HSV-010 GT was superseded by the Honda NSX Concept-GT for 2014, based on the second generation NSX Concept.
