= Honda HR09E/HR10EG engine =

Honda HR-09E/HR-10EG engine

Overview
- Manufacturer: Honda
- Production: 2009–2013

Layout
- Configuration: 90° V8
- Displacement: 3.4 L (3,396 cc)
- Cylinder bore: 93 mm (3.66 in)
- Piston stroke: 62.5 mm (2.46 in)
- Cylinder block material: Aluminum alloy
- Cylinder head material: Aluminum alloy
- Valvetrain: 32-valve (four-valves per cylinder), DOHC

Combustion
- Fuel system: Electronic indirect multi-point port fuel injection
- Management: Motorola
- Fuel type: 100% fuel grade Gasoline (various per teams)
- Oil system: Dry sump
- Cooling system: Single water pump

Output
- Power output: 490–640 hp (365–477 kW)
- Torque output: 289–405 lb⋅ft (392–549 N⋅m)

Dimensions
- Dry weight: 265 lb (120 kg) excluding headers, clutch, ECU, spark box or filters

The Honda HR-09E and Honda HR-10EG are 3.4-liter, naturally-aspirated, V8 racing engines, developed and produced by Honda for use in Formula Nippon and Super GT, starting in 2009.

== HR10EG ==
The 3.4 L (210 cu in) HR10EG V8 engine was based on the HR09E built for Formula Nippon. On December 22, 2009, Honda announced the HSV-010 GT as the successor to the NSX Super GT in the Super GT series.

For the 2011 season, the HSV-010 GT's radiator was divided in two and relocated to the sides of the car, with the goal of quicker cornering via a reduced moment of inertia with respect to yaw.

For the 2013 season, the last season under 2009 regulations, the radiator was moved back to the front of the car with lightened equipment. Instead, a shorter exhaust system with exhaust exits on both sides was used, allowing the V8 engine to rev higher. The HSV-010 GT's overall potential was improved, with the #17 Keihin HSV-010 placing second overall in the Teams' Championship.

== Applications ==
- Swift FN09
- Honda HSV-010 GT
