= Loïc Duval =

French racing driver (born 1982)

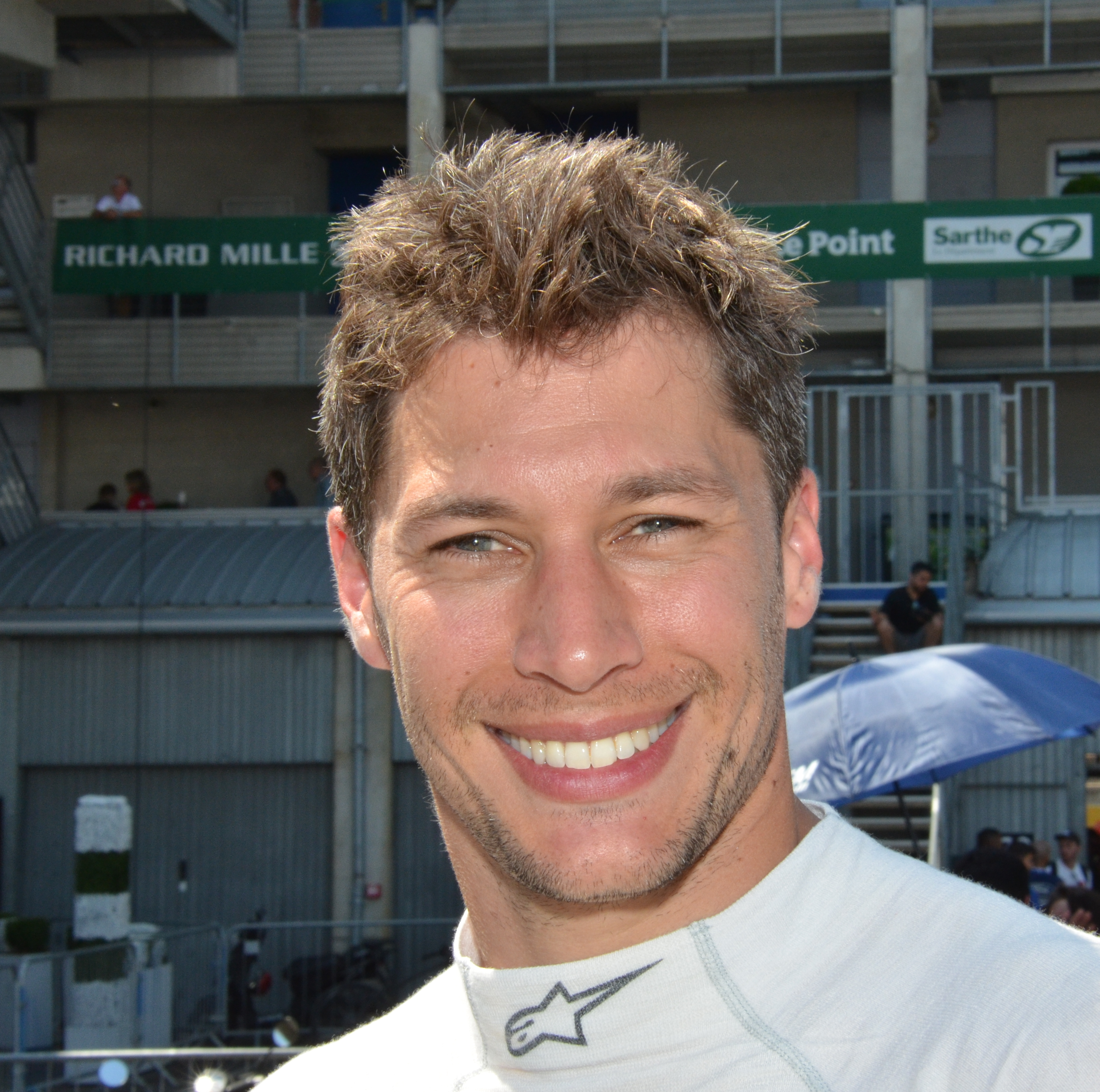
- Duval in 2018
- Nationality: (France) French
- Born: Loïc Jean-Claude Duval; 12 June 1982 (age 44) Chartres, France

Formula E career
- Debut season: 2014–15
- Categorisation: FIA Platinum
- Car number: 6
- Former teams: Dragon Racing
- Starts: 31
- Wins: 0
- Podiums: 2
- Poles: 0
- Fastest laps: 2
- Best finish: 8th in 2015–16
- Finished last season: 15th

DTM career
- Debut season: 2017
- Current team: Phoenix Racing
- Car number: 77
- Starts: 70
- Wins: 0
- Podiums: 4
- Poles: 2
- Fastest laps: 1

FIA World Endurance Championship career
- Debut season: 2012
- Current team: Peugeot TotalEnergies
- Car number: 94
- Former teams: Audi Sport Team Joest, TDS Racing
- Starts: 80
- Championships: 1 (2013)
- Wins: 6
- Podiums: 21
- Poles: 6

Previous series
- 2009 2008, 2010 2006–07–2008–09 2006–12 2006–10, 2012–14 2004–05 2003 2002: Asian Le Mans Series; Le Mans Series; A1 Grand Prix; Super GT; Formula Nippon; Formula 3 Euro Series; Formula Renault 2000 France; Formula Campus France

Championship titles
- 2013 2010 2009 2003 2002: World Endurance Championship; Super GT - GT500; Formula Nippon; Formula Renault 2000 France; Formula Campus France

24 Hours of Le Mans career
- Years: 2008, 2010–2013, 2015–2016, 2018
- Teams: Team Oreca-Matmut; Audi Sport Team Joest
- Best finish: 1st (2013)
- Class wins: 1 (2013)

Loïc Jean-Claude Duval (French pronunciation: [lɔ.ik dyval]; born 12 June 1982) is a French professional racing driver racing for Peugeot Sport in the FIA World Endurance Championship. Duval is a former FIA WEC champion and a winner of the 24 Hours of Le Mans endurance race, winning the 2013 edition alongside Allan McNish and Tom Kristensen driving the Audi R18 for Audi Sport. He is also a former Formula Nippon champion, winning the title in 2009.

So far, Duval has won 42 races in the different categories he raced.

== Career ==
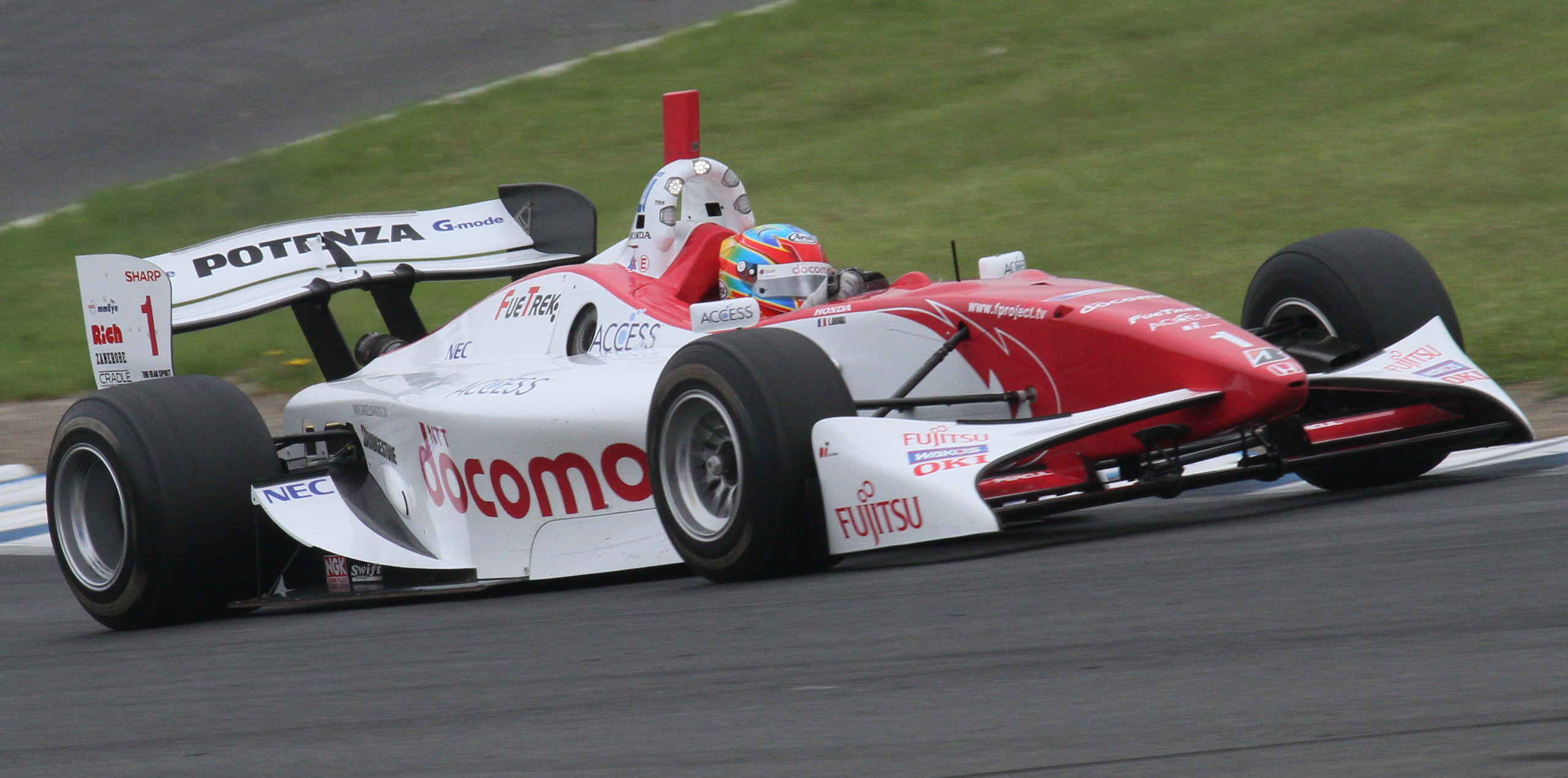
Duval during free practice at the first Motegi round of the 2010 Formula Nippon season

Born in Chartres, Duval began his career in karting. In 2002 was the Formula Campus France champion. In 2003 he was the Formula Renault 2000 France champion. In 2004, he placed eleventh with two podiums in the Formula 3 Euro Series and tested for Renault F1. The next year, he finished sixth in F3 Euro Series and won a pole at the Macau Grand Prix. He then moved to Japan where he began racing in Formula Nippon and Super GT. In 2007, he continued in Formula Nippon and made two starts for A1 Team France in the A1 Grand Prix series in Australia and New Zealand. He won the 2009 Formula Nippon Championship with four wins driving for Nakajima Racing after finishing second in 2008.

On 11 June 2014, the Le Mans Audi No. 1 driven by Duval was severely damaged, casting doubt whether it could be repaired for the race, or if Audi could build a new car in time, which would start from the back of the field. Duval was in reasonable condition, considering the magnitude of the accident.

=== Formula E (2015–2017) ===
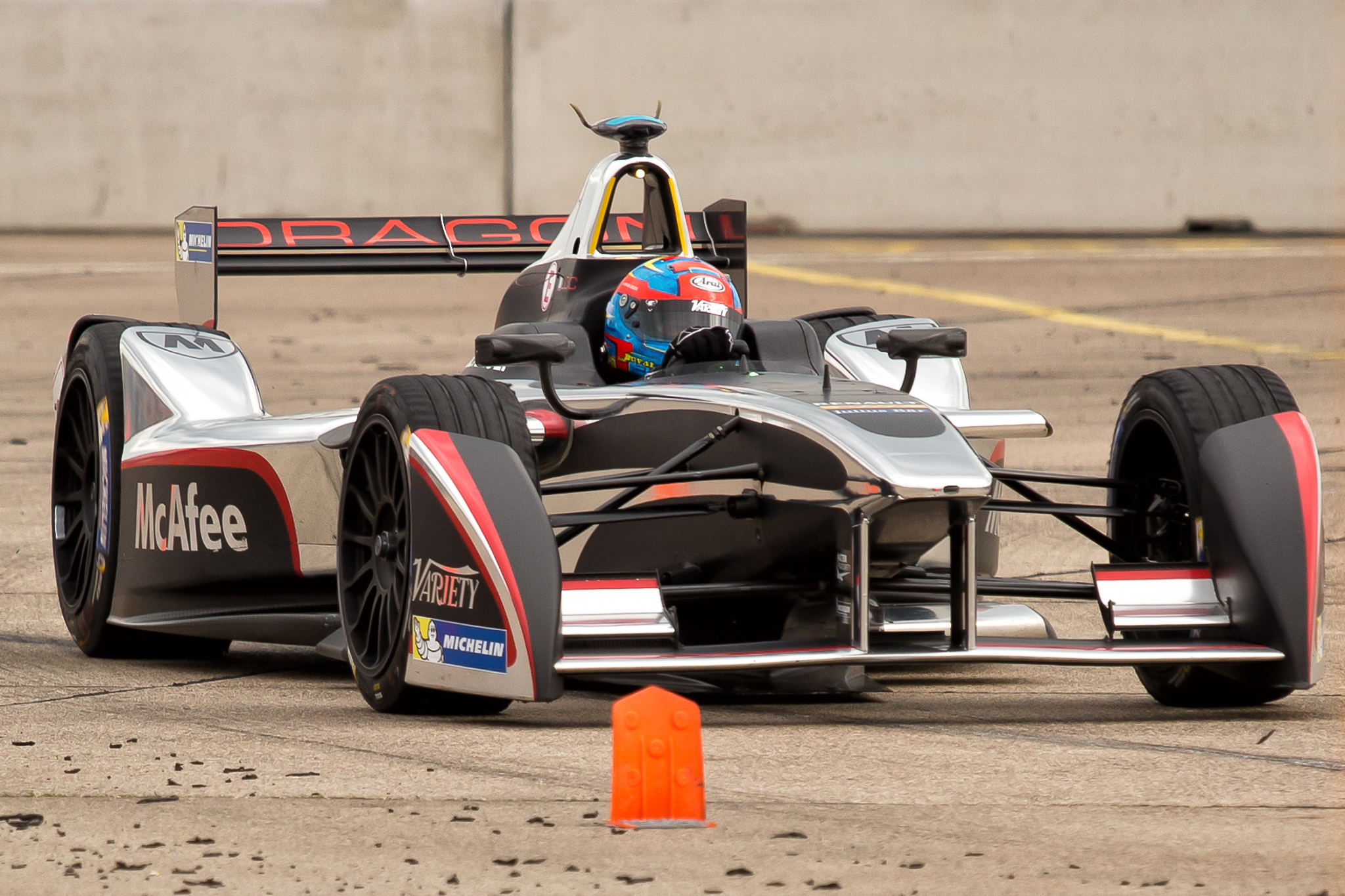
Duval at the 2015 Berlin ePrix

Duval made his Formula E debut at the 2015 Miami ePrix in March 2015, having missed the first four races of the inaugural 2014-15 Formula E season. He replaced Oriol Servià and partnered Jérôme d'Ambrosio at Dragon Racing, an American and former IndyCar team. Despite a slow start to his career, Duval achieved his first podium finish of the season with third place at the 2015 Berlin ePrix with teammate d'Ambrosio winning the race, resulting in Dragon Racing first double podium finish. Duval made second appearance to the podium at round two of the London ePrix in the season finale. Duval finished the season in ninth position with 42 points, having raced in seven of the eleven championship rounds. Duval's contributions helped Dragon Racing finish second in the Championship having spent the majority of the season outside the top five.

=== 2015–2016 ===
Duval started the 2015–16 season off strongly, having out qualified teammate d'Ambrosio in the opening two rounds. Duval finished fourth in Beijing, the first time he has outraced teammate d'Ambrosio. During the following round in Putrajaya, Duval crashed while fighting for a podium in the closing stages of the race. In Punta del Este, Duval qualified second on the front row alongside d'Ambrosio resulting in Dragon Racing's first front row lockout. He finished fourth, two tenths of a second behind his teammate in third.

== Racing record ==
=== Career summary ===
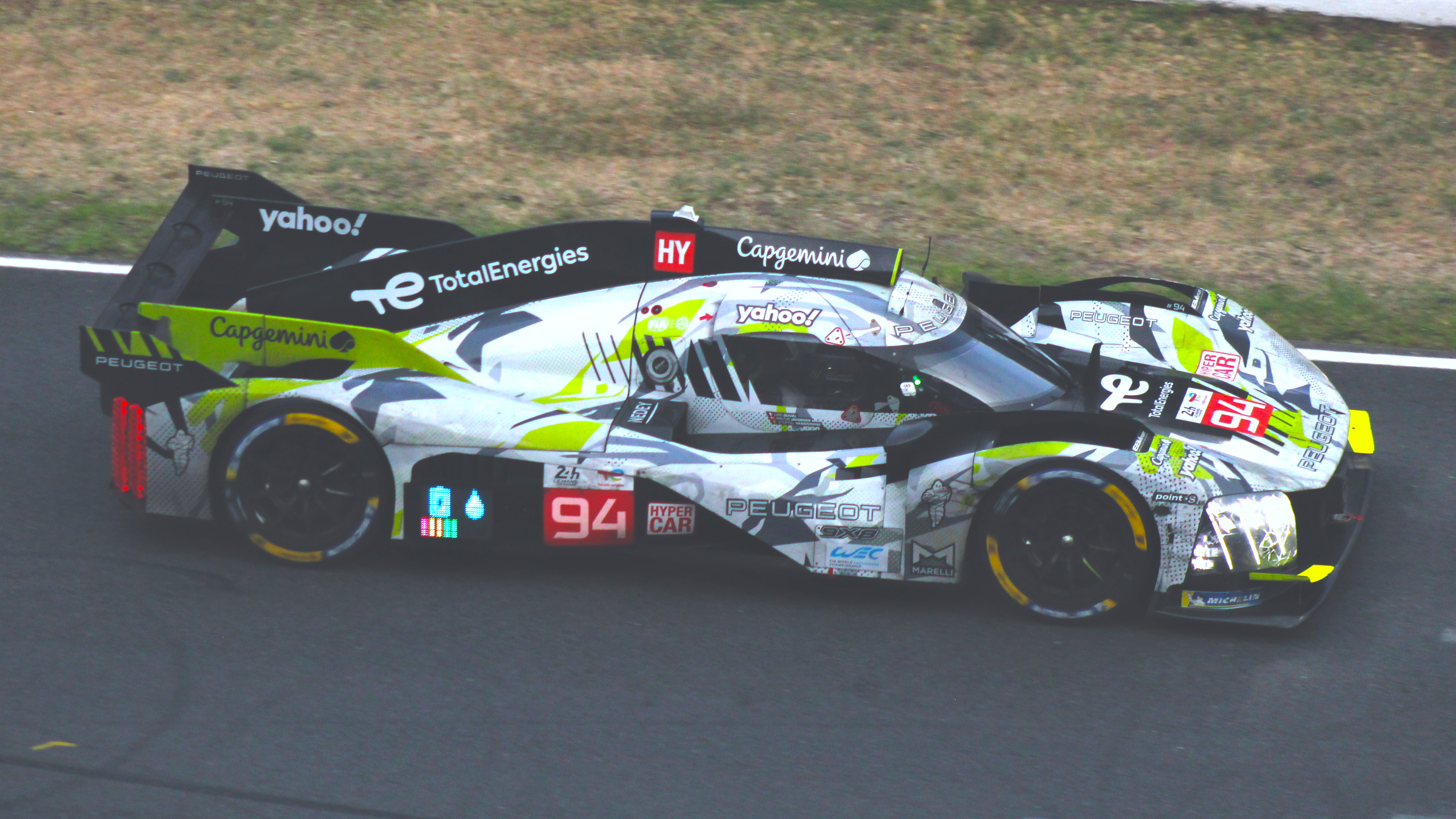
Duval's No. 94 car at the 2025 24 Hours of Le Mans

Season	Series	Team	Races	Wins	Poles	F/Laps	Podiums	Points	Position
2002	Formula Renault Campus France	Filière FFSA	16	9	9	?	13	253	**1st**
2003	Formula Renault 2000 France	Graff Racing	10	4	4	1	5	116	**1st**
2004	Formula 3 Euro Series	Signature	20	0	0	0	2	22	12th
2004	Bahrain Superprix	Signature	1	0	0	0	0	N/A	8th
2004	Masters of Formula 3	Signature	1	0	0	0	0	N/A	14th
2004	Macau Grand Prix	Signature	1	0	0	0	0	N/A	NC
2005	Formula 3 Euro Series	Signature-Plus	19	0	0	0	5	47	7th
2005	Masters of Formula 3	Signature-Plus	1	0	0	0	0	N/A	10th
2005	Macau Grand Prix	ASM	1	0	1	1	0	N/A	6th
2006	Formula Nippon	Nakajima Racing	9	2	0	1	2	25	4th
2006	Super GT	Nakajima Racing	9	1	1	1	1	51	11th
2006–07	A1 Grand Prix	A1 Team France	8	0	0	0	4	67‡	4th‡
2007	Formula Nippon	Nakajima Racing	9	0	0	1	4	31	6th
2007	Super GT	Nakajima Racing	9	1	0	1	3	69	**2nd**
2007–08	A1 Grand Prix	A1 Team France	12	1	2	1	7	118‡	4th‡
2008	Formula Nippon	Nakajima Racing	11	2	0	1	6	62	**2nd**
2008	Super GT	Nakajima Racing	9	0	0	0	1	43	10th
2008	Le Mans Series	Team Oreca Matmut	1	0	0	0	0	3	17th
2008	24 Hours of Le Mans	Team Oreca Matmut	1	0	0	0	0	N/A	10th
2008–09	A1 Grand Prix	A1 Team France	6	1	0	1	3	47‡	5th‡
2009	Formula Nippon	Nakajima Racing	8	4	3	3	6	62	**1st**
2009	Super GT	Nakajima Racing	9	0	1	0	0	18	16th
2009	Asian Le Mans Series	Team Oreca Matmut	2	0	0	0	2	14	**3rd**
2010	Formula Nippon	Docomo Team Dandelion Racing	8	2	3	1	3	39.5	**3rd**
2010	Super GT	Weider Honda Racing	7	1	3	3	5	67	**1st**
2010	Le Mans Series	Team Oreca Matmut	2	0	0	0	0	17	15th
2010	24 Hours of Le Mans	Team Oreca Matmut	1	0	0	0	0	N/A	NC
2011	Super GT	Weider Honda Racing	7	2	1	0	2	57	**3rd**
2011	Le Mans Series	Team Oreca Matmut	1	0	0	0	0	0	NC†
2011	24 Hours of Le Mans	Team Oreca Matmut	1	0	0	0	0	N/A	5th
2011	American Le Mans Series	Team Oreca Matmut	1	1	0	0	1	0	NC†
2011	Intercontinental Le Mans Cup	Team Oreca Matmut	3	1	0	0	1	—N/a	
2012	Formula Nippon	Team Kygnus Sunoco	8	0	0	1	3	25	6th
2012	JAF Grand Prix	Team Kygnus Sunoco	1	0	0	0	1	N/A	**3rd**
2012	JAF Grand Prix	TOM'S	1	0	0	0	0	15‡	**2nd**‡
2012	Super GT	TOM'S	7	0	0	0	1	32	11th
2012	FIA World Endurance Championship	Audi Sport Team Joest	3	1	0	1	2	67	6th
2012	24 Hours of Le Mans	Audi Sport Team Joest	1	0	0	1	0	N/A	5th
2013	Super Formula	Kygnus Sunoco Team LeMans	4	1	2	0	3	31	4th
2013	JAF Grand Prix	Kygnus Sunoco Team LeMans	1	0	0	0	1	N/A	**2nd**
2013	FIA World Endurance Championship	Audi Sport Team Joest	8	3	2	0	7	162	**1st**
2013	24 Hours of Le Mans	Audi Sport Team Joest	1	1	1	0	1	N/A	**1st**
2014	FIA World Endurance Championship	Audi Sport Team Joest	8	0	0	0	3	81	7th
2014	Super Formula	Kygnus Sunoco Team LeMans	8	1	0	1	4	29.5	4th
2014–15	Formula E	Dragon Racing	7	0	0	0	2	42	9th
2015	FIA World Endurance Championship	Audi Sport Team Joest	8	0	0	1	1	99	4th
2015	24 Hours of Le Mans	Audi Sport Team Joest	1	0	0	0	0	N/A	4th
2015–16	Formula E	Dragon Racing	10	0	0	0	0	60	8th
2016	FIA World Endurance Championship	Audi Sport Team Joest	9	2	3	2	6	147.5	**2nd**
2016	24 Hours of Le Mans	Audi Sport Team Joest	1	0	0	0	1	N/A	**3rd**
2016–17	Formula E	Faraday Future Dragon Racing	11	0	0	2	0	20	15th
2017	Deutsche Tourenwagen Masters	Audi Sport Team Phoenix	18	0	0	1	1	22	18th
2017	IMSA SportsCar Championship – Prototype	DragonSpeed	1	0	0	0	0	21	39th
2017	FIA World Endurance Championship – LMP2	G-Drive Racing	1	0	0	0	0	6	28th
2018	Deutsche Tourenwagen Masters	Audi Sport Team Phoenix	20	0	1	0	0	54	17th
2018	European Le Mans Series – LMP2	TDS Racing	3	0	0	0	2	38	10th
2018	24 Hours of Le Mans – LMP2	TDS Racing	1	0	0	0	0	N/A	DSQ
2018	IMSA SportsCar Championship – Prototype	CORE Autosport	1	0	0	0	1	30	47th
2018–19	FIA World Endurance Championship – LMP2	TDS Racing	6	0	1	0	1	42	10th
2019	Deutsche Tourenwagen Masters	Audi Sport Team Phoenix	18	0	0	0	1	134	7th
2019	IMSA SportsCar Championship – DPi	CORE Autosport	1	0	0	0	0	28	31st
2019	24 Hours of Le Mans – LMP2	TDS Racing	1	0	0	0	0	N/A	**3rd**
2019–20	FIA World Endurance Championship	Rebellion Racing	1	0	0	0	0	0	NC†
2020	Deutsche Tourenwagen Masters	Audi Sport Team Phoenix	16	0	1	0	2	108	7th
2020	European Le Mans Series – LMP2	Algarve Pro Racing	4	0	0	0	0	9	20th
2020	IMSA SportsCar Championship – DPi	JDC-Mustang Sampling Racing	3	0	0	0	1	84	18th
2021	IMSA SportsCar Championship – DPi	JDC-Mustang Sampling Racing	10	1	0	1	3	2933	6th
2021	FIA World Endurance Championship – LMP2	Realteam Racing	5	0	0	0	0	41	12th
2021	24 Hours of Le Mans – LMP2	Realteam Racing	1	0	0	0	0	N/A	12th
2021	European Le Mans Series – LMP2	Realteam Racing	1	0	0	0	0	0	NC†
2022	IMSA SportsCar Championship – DPi	JDC-Miller MotorSports	4	0	0	0	2	1209	9th
2022	FIA World Endurance Championship – Hypercar	Peugeot TotalEnergies	3	0	0	0	0	40	6th
2023	FIA World Endurance Championship – Hypercar	Peugeot TotalEnergies	7	0	0	0	0	28	11th
2023	24 Hours of Le Mans – Hypercar	Peugeot TotalEnergies	1	0	0	0	0	N/A	12th
2024	FIA World Endurance Championship - Hypercar	Peugeot TotalEnergies	8	0	0	0	0	4	28th
2025	FIA World Endurance Championship - Hypercar	Peugeot TotalEnergies	8	0	0	0	1	28	19th
2026	FIA World Endurance Championship - Hypercar	Peugeot TotalEnergies	8	0	1	0	0	24	18th

^{†} Ineligible for championship points.
^{‡} Team standings.

=== Complete Formula 3 Euro Series results ===
(key)

Year	Entrant	Chassis	Engine	1	2	3	4	5	6	7	8	9	10	11	12	13	14	15	16	17	18	19	20	DC	Points
2004	Opel Team Signature	Dallara F302/043	Spiess-Opel	HOC; 1; 16	HOC; 2; 14	EST; 1; 5	EST; 2; 20	ADR; 1; 19	ADR; 1; 14	PAU; 1; 7	PAU; 2 Ret	NOR; 1; 2	NOR; 1; 8	MAG; 1; 3	MAG; 2 Ret	NÜR; 1; 14	NÜR; 2; 23	ZAN; 1 Ret	ZAN; 2 Ret	BRN; 1; 8	BRN; 2; 13	HOC; 1; 11	HOC; 2; 18	12th	22
2005	Signature-Plus	Dallara F305/036	Spiess-Opel	HOC; 1; 6	HOC; 2; 2	PAU; 1; 2	PAU; 2; 3	SPA; 1; 12†	SPA; 2 DNS	MON; 1; 3	MON; 2; 2	OSC; 1 Ret	OSC; 2; 8	NOR; 1 Ret	NOR; 2; 5	NÜR; 1; 6	NÜR; 2; 10	ZAN; 1; 10	ZAN; 2; 16†	LAU; 1; 12	LAU; 2; 9	HOC; 1 DSQ	HOC; 2; 4	6th	52

^{†} Driver did not finish the race, but was classified as he completed over 90% of the race distance.

=== Complete Formula Nippon/Super Formula results ===
(key) (Races in bold indicate pole position; races in italics indicate fastest lap)

Year	Team	Engine	1	2	3	4	5	6	7	8	9	10	11	DC	Points
2006	PIAA Nakajima Racing	Honda	FUJ; 11	SUZ; 1	MOT; 6	SUZ; Ret	AUT; 18	FUJ; 9	SUG; 1	MOT; 4	SUZ; 6			4th	25
2007	PIAA Nakajima Racing	Honda	FUJ; 3	SUZ; 4	MOT; Ret	OKA; 19	SUZ; 11	FUJ; 3	SUG; 3	MOT; 2	SUZ; Ret			6th	31
2008	PIAA Nakajima Racing	Honda	FUJ; 10	SUZ; 10	MOT; 3	OKA; 1	SUZ; 6	SUZ; 2	MOT; 1	MOT; Ret	FUJ; 2	FUJ; 7	SUG; 3	2nd	62
2009	PIAA Nakajima Racing	Honda	FUJ; 4	SUZ; 1	MOT; Ret	**FUJ**; 1	**SUZ**; 1	MOT; 2	AUT; 3	**SUG**; 1				1st	62
2010	Docomo Team Dandelion Racing	Honda	SUZ; 6	MOT; 4	**FUJ**; 14	MOT; 1	**SUG**; 2	AUT; DNS	**SUZ**; 1	SUZ; 4				3rd	39.5
2012	Team Kygnus Sunoco	Toyota	SUZ; 9	MOT; 11	AUT; 3	FUJ; 4	MOT; 6	SUG; 3	SUZ; 7	SUZ; 2				6th	25
2013	Kygnus Sunoco Team LeMans	Toyota	SUZ	AUT; 2	**FUJ**; 4	MOT; 3	**SUG**; 1	SUZ	SUZ					3rd	31
2014	Team LeMans	Toyota	SUZ; 1	FUJ; 3	FUJ; 4	FUJ	MOT; 4	AUT; 15	SUG; 3	SUZ; 11	SUZ; 3			4th	29.5

=== Complete Super GT results ===
Year	Team	Car	Class	1	2	3	4	5	6	7	8	9	DC	Pts
2006	Nakajima Racing	Honda NSX	GT500	SUZ; 15	OKA; Ret	FUJ; 7	SEP; 9	SUG; 5	SUZ; 4	MOT; 8	AUT; 12	FUJ; 1	11th	51
2007	Nakajima Racing	Honda NSX	GT500	SUZ; 3	OKA; 4	FUJ; Ret	SEP; 15	SUG; 3	SUZ; 13	MOT; 4	AUT; 9	FUJ; 1	2nd	69
2008	Nakajima Racing	Honda NSX	GT500	SUZ; 10	OKA; 5	FUJ; 7	SEP; Ret	SUG; Ret	SUZ; 11	MOT; 5	AUT; 2	FUJ; 4	10th	43
2009	Nakajima Racing	Honda NSX	GT500	OKA; 7	SUZ; 9	FUJ; 8	SEP; 11	SUG; 11	SUZ; Ret	FUJ; 9	AUT; 9	MOT; 6	16th	18
2010	Honda Racing	Honda HSV-010 GT	GT500	SUZ; Ret	OKA; 1	FUJ; 7	SEP; 3	SUG; 2	SUZ; 9	FUJ; C	MOT; 2		1st	67
2011	Honda Racing	Honda HSV-010 GT	GT500	OKA; 7	FUJ; 13	SEP; 1	SUG; Ret	SUZ; 1	FUJ; 4	AUT; 11	MOT; 6		3rd	57
2012	Petronas Team TOM'S	Lexus SC430	GT500	OKA; 5	FUJ	SEP; 13	SUG; 2	SUZ; Ret	FUJ; 4	AUT; 15	MOT; 8		11th	32

=== Complete A1 Grand Prix results ===
(key) (Races in bold indicate pole position) (Races in italics indicate fastest lap)

Year	Entrant	1	2	3	4	5	6	7	8	9	10	11	12	13	14	15	16	17	18	19	20	21	22	DC	Points
2006–07	France	NED; SPR	NED; FEA	CZE; SPR	CZE; FEA	CHN; SPR	CHN; FEA	MYS; SPR	MYS; FEA	IDN; SPR	IDN; FEA	NZL; SPR; 2	NZL; FEA; 2	AUS; SPR; 3	AUS; FEA; 9	RSA; SPR; 2	RSA; FEA; Ret	MEX; SPR	MEX; FEA	CHN; SPR	CHN; FEA	GBR; SPR; 4	GBR; SPR; 7	4th	67
2007–08	France	NED; SPR; 2	NED; FEA; 5	CZE; SPR	CZE; FEA	MYS; SPR; 2	MYS; FEA; 2	CHN; SPR; 8	CHN; FEA; 7	NZL; SPR; 3	**NZL**; **FEA**; 3	**AUS**; **SPR**; 1	AUS; FEA; Ret	RSA; SPR; 11	RSA; FEA; 2	MEX; SPR	MEX; FEA	CHN; SPR	CHN; FEA	GBR; SPR	GBR; FEA			4th	118
2008–09	France	NED; SPR; 3	NED; FEA; 1	CHN; SPR	CHN; FEA	MYS; SPR; 2	MYS; FEA; 14	NZL; SPR; 4	NZL; FEA; 6	RSA; SPR	RSA; FEA	POR; SPR	POR; FEA	GBR; SPR	GBR; SPR									5th	47

=== Complete 24 Hours of Le Mans results ===
Year	Team	Co-Drivers	Car	Class	Laps	Pos.	Class Pos.
2008	(France) Team Oreca-Matmut	(France) Soheil Ayari (France) Laurent Groppi	Courage-Oreca LC70-Judd	LMP1	357	8th	8th
2010	(France) Team Oreca-Matmut	(France) Olivier Panis (France) Nicolas Lapierre	Peugeot 908 HDi FAP	LMP1	373	DNF	DNF
2011	(France) Team Oreca-Matmut	(France) Nicolas Lapierre (France) Olivier Panis	Peugeot 908 HDi FAP	LMP1	339	5th	5th
2012	(Germany) Audi Sport Team Joest	(Spain) Marc Gené (France) Romain Dumas	Audi R18 ultra	LMP1	366	5th	5th
2013	(Germany) Audi Sport Team Joest	(United Kingdom) Allan McNish (Denmark) Tom Kristensen	Audi R18 e-tron quattro	LMP1	348	**1st**	**1st**
2015	(Germany) Audi Sport Team Joest	(Brazil) Lucas di Grassi (United Kingdom) Oliver Jarvis	Audi R18 e-tron quattro	LMP1	392	4th	4th
2016	(Germany) Audi Sport Team Joest	(Brazil) Lucas di Grassi (United Kingdom) Oliver Jarvis	Audi R18	LMP1	372	**3rd**	**3rd**
2018	(France) TDS Racing	(France) François Perrodo (France) Matthieu Vaxivière	Oreca 07-Gibson	LMP2	366	DSQ	DSQ
2019	(France) TDS Racing	(France) François Perrodo (France) Matthieu Vaxivière	Oreca 07-Gibson	LMP2	366	8th	**3rd**
2021	(Switzerland) Realteam Racing	(Switzerland) Esteban García (France) Norman Nato	Oreca 07-Gibson	LMP2	356	17th	12th
2021	(Switzerland) Realteam Racing	(Switzerland) Esteban García (France) Norman Nato	Oreca 07-Gibson	LMP2 Pro-Am	356	17th	3rd
2023	(France) Peugeot TotalEnergies	(United States) Gustavo Menezes (Switzerland) Nico Müller	Peugeot 9X8	Hypercar	312	27th	12th
2024	(France) Peugeot TotalEnergies	(United Kingdom) Paul di Resta (Belgium) Stoffel Vandoorne	Peugeot 9X8	Hypercar	309	11th	11th
2025	(France) Peugeot TotalEnergies	(Denmark) Malthe Jakobsen (Belgium) Stoffel Vandoorne	Peugeot 9X8	Hypercar	384	11th	11th
2026	(France) Peugeot TotalEnergies	(Denmark) Malthe Jakobsen (France) Théo Pourchaire	Peugeot 9X8	Hypercar	377	11th	11th

=== Complete FIA World Endurance Championship results ===
Year	Entrant	Class	Chassis	Engine	1	2	3	4	5	6	7	8	9	Rank	Points
2012	Audi Sport Team Joest	LMP1	Audi R18 ultra	Audi TDI 3.7L Turbo V6 (Diesel)	SEB; 2	SPA; 1	LMS; 4	SIL	SÃO	BHR	FUJ	SHA		6th	67
2013	Audi Sport Team Joest	LMP1	Audi R18 e-tron quattro	Audi TDI 3.7L Turbo V6 (Hybrid Diesel)	SIL; 1	SPA; 2	**LMS**; 1	SÃO; 2	**COA**; 1	FUJ; 2	SHA; 3	BHR; Ret		**1st**	**162**
2014	Audi Sport Team Joest	LMP1	Audi R18 e-tron quattro	Audi TDI 4.0 L Turbo V6 (Hybrid Diesel)	SIL; Ret	SPA; 2	LMS; DNS	COA; 2	FUJ; 5	SHA; 5	BHR; 5	SÃO; 3		7th	81
2015	Audi Sport Team Joest	LMP1	Audi R18 e-tron quattro	Audi TDI 4.0 L Turbo V6 (Hybrid Diesel)	SIL; 5	SPA; 7	LMS; 4	NÜR; 4	COA; 3	FUJ; 4	SHA; 4	BHR; 6		4th	99
2016	Audi Sport Team Joest	LMP1	Audi R18	Audi TDI 4.0 L Turbo Diesel V6 (Hybrid)	SIL; Ret	SPA; 1	LMS; 3	NÜR; 2	**MEX**; 15	COA; 2	**FUJ**; 2	SHA; 5	**BHR**; 1	2nd	147.5
2017	G-Drive Racing	LMP2	Oreca 07	Gibson GK428 4.2 L V8	SIL	SPA	LMS	NÜR	MEX	COA	FUJ	SHA	BHR; 7	28th	6
2018–19	TDS Racing	LMP2	Oreca 07	Gibson GK428 4.2 L V8	SPA; 4	LMS; DSQ	SIL; 7	FUJ	SHA; Ret	SEB; NC	SPA	**LMS**; 3		10th	42
2021	Realteam Racing	LMP2	Oreca 07	Gibson GK428 4.2 L V8	SPA; 6	ALG	MNZ; 7	LMS; 7	BHR; 7	BHR; 7				12th	41
2022	Peugeot TotalEnergies	Hypercar	Peugeot 9X8	Peugeot X6H 2.6 L Turbo V6	SEB	SPA	LMS	MNZ; 4	FUJ; 5	BHR; 4				6th	40
2023	Peugeot TotalEnergies	Hypercar	Peugeot 9X8	Peugeot X6H 2.6 L Turbo V6	SEB; NC	ALG; 5	SPA; 9	LMS; 9	MNZ; 11	FUJ; 7	BHR; 8			11th	28
2024	Peugeot TotalEnergies	Hypercar	Peugeot 9X8	Peugeot X6H 2.6 L Turbo V6	QAT; 15	IMO; 15	SPA; 14	LMS; 11	SÃO; 16	COA; Ret	FUJ; 8	BHR; Ret		28th	4
2025	Peugeot TotalEnergies	Hypercar	Peugeot 9X8	Peugeot X6H 2.6 L Turbo V6	QAT; 12	IMO; 12	SPA; Ret	LMS; 10	SÃO; 6	COA; 3	FUJ; 10	BHR; 10		19th	28
2026	Peugeot TotalEnergies	Hypercar	Peugeot 9X8	Peugeot X6H 2.6 L Turbo V6	IMO; 12	**SPA**; Ret	LMS; 10	SÃO; 14	COA; 10	FUJ; 6	CAT; 13	MNZ; 4		18th	24

=== Complete Formula E results ===
(key) (Races in bold indicate pole position; races in italics indicate fastest lap)

Year	Team	Chassis	Powertrain	1	2	3	4	5	6	7	8	9	10	11	12	Pos	Points
2014–15	Dragon Racing	Spark SRT01-e	SRT01-e	BEI	PUT	PDE	BUE	MIA; 7	LBH; 9	MCO; Ret	BER; 3	MSC; 15	LDN; 8	LDN; 3		9th	42
2015–16	Dragon Racing	Spark SRT01-e	Venturi VM200-FE-01	BEI; 4	PUT; 16^{†}	PDE; 4	BUE; 6	MEX; 4	LBH; 8	PAR; Ret	BER; Ret	LDN; Ret	LDN; 4			8th	60
2016–17	Faraday Future Dragon Racing	Spark SRT01-e	Penske 701-EV	HKG; 14	MRK; 18	BUE; 6	MEX; Ret	MCO; NC	PAR	BER; 15	BER; Ret	NYC; 5	NYC; 13†	MTL; Ret	MTL; 19†	15th	20

^{†} Driver did not finish the race, but was classified as he completed more than 90% of the race distance.

=== Complete Deutsche Tourenwagen Masters results ===
(key) (Races in bold indicate pole position) (Races in italics indicate fastest lap)

Year	Team	Car	1	2	3	4	5	6	7	8	9	10	11	12	13	14	15	16	17	18	19	20	Pos	Points
2017	Audi Sport Team Phoenix	Audi RS5 DTM	HOC; 1; 14	HOC; 2 Ret	LAU; 1; 15	LAU; 2; 18	HUN; 1; 14	HUN; 2; 16	NOR; 1; 15	NOR; 2; 15	MSC; 1; 11	MSC; 2; 14	ZAN; 1; 13	ZAN; 2; 2	NÜR; 1; 18	NÜR; 2; 15	SPL; 1; 14	SPL; 2; 8	HOC; 1; 18	HOC; 2; 15			18th	22
2018	Audi Sport Team Phoenix	Audi RS5 DTM	HOC; 1; 10	HOC; 2; 5	LAU; 1 Ret	LAU; 2; 13	HUN; 1; 8	HUN; 2; 9	NOR; 1; 17	NOR; 2; 18	ZAN; 1; 11	ZAN; 2; 15	BRH; 1 Ret	BRH; 2; 16	MIS; 1; 4	**MIS**; **2**; 7	NÜR; 1; 8	NÜR; 2; 12	SPL; 1 Ret	SPL; 2; 16	HOC; 1; 5	HOC; 2; 12	17th	54
2019	Audi Sport Team Phoenix	Audi RS5 Turbo DTM	HOC; 1; 5	HOC; 2 Ret	ZOL; 1; 4	ZOL; 2; 11	MIS; 1; 3	MIS; 2; 11	NOR; 1; 4	NOR; 2; 6	ASS; 1; 8	ASS; 2; 11	BRH; 1; 5	BRH; 2; 4	LAU; 1; 6	LAU; 2; 8	NÜR; 1; 5	NÜR; 2; 4	HOC; 1; 5	HOC; 2; 10			7th	134
2020	Audi Sport Team Phoenix	Audi RS5 Turbo DTM	SPA; 1; 3	SPA; 2; 7	LAU; 1 Ret	LAU; 2; 8	LAU; 1; 7	LAU; 2; 8	**ASS**; **1**; 2	ASS; 2; 4	NÜR; 1; 9	NÜR; 2; 4	NÜR; 1 Ret	NÜR; 2; 9	ZOL; 1; 10	ZOL; 2; 13	ZOL; 1	ZOL; 2	HOC; 1; 4	HOC; 2; 6			7th	108

^{†} Driver did not finish, but was classified as he completed 75% of the race distance.

=== Complete IMSA SportsCar Championship results ===
Year	Entrant	No.	Class	Chassis	Engine	1	2	3	4	5	6	7	8	9	10	Rank	Points
2017	DragonSpeed	81	P	Oreca 07	Gibson GK428 4.2 L V8	DAY; 10	SEB	LBH	COA	DET	WGL	MOS	ELK	LGA	PET	39th	21
2018	CORE Autosport	54	P	Oreca 07	Gibson GK428 4.2 L V8	DAY; 3	SEB	LBH	MDO	DET	WGL	MOS	ELK	LGA	PET	47th	30
2019	CORE Autosport	54	DPi	Nissan Onroak DPi	Nissan VR38DETT 3.8 L Turbo V6	DAY; 4	SEB	LBH	MDO	DET	WGL	MOS	ELK	LGA	PET	31st	28
2020	JDC-Mustang Sampling Racing	5	DPi	Cadillac DPi-V.R	Cadillac 5.5 L V8	DAY; 3	DAY	SEB	ELK	ATL	MDO	PET; 4	LGA	SEB; 5		18th	84
2021	JDC-Mustang Sampling Racing	5	DPi	Cadillac DPi-V.R	Cadillac 5.5 L V8	DAY; 7	SEB; 1	MDO; 4	DET; 5	WGL; 7	WGL; 4	ELK; 6	LGA; 6	LBH; 3	PET; 7	6th	2933
2022	JDC-Miller MotorSports	5	DPi	Cadillac DPi-V.R	Cadillac 5.5 L V8	DAY; 3	SEB; 2	LBH	LGA	MDO	DET	WGL; 7	MOS	ELK	PET; 7	9th	1209

=== Complete 24 Hours of Daytona results ===
Year	Team	Co-drivers	Car	Class	Laps	Pos.	Class pos.
2017	(United States) DragonSpeed	(Sweden) Henrik Hedman (France) Nicolas Lapierre (United Kingdom) Ben Hanley	Oreca 07-Gibson	P	562	DNF	DNF
2018	(United States) CORE Autosport	(United States) Jon Bennett (United States) Colin Braun (France) Romain Dumas	Oreca 07-Gibson	P	808	**3rd**	**3rd**
2019	(United States) CORE Autosport	(United States) Jon Bennett (United States) Colin Braun (France) Romain Dumas	Nissan DPi	DPi	589	4th	4th
2020	(United States) JDC-Mustang Sampling Racing	(France) Sébastien Bourdais (Portugal) João Barbosa	Cadillac DPi-V.R	DPi	833	**3rd**	**3rd**
2021	(United States) JDC-Mustang Sampling Racing	(France) Tristan Vautier (France) Sébastien Bourdais	Cadillac DPi-V.R	DPi	723	DNF	DNF
2022	(United States) JDC-Miller MotorSports	(United States) Ben Keating (France) Tristan Vautier (United Kingdom) Richard Westbrook	Cadillac DPi-V.R	DPi	761	**3rd**	**3rd**

=== Complete European Le Mans Series results ===
Year	Entrant	Class	Chassis	Engine	1	2	3	4	5	6	Rank	Points
2008	Team Oreca-Matmut	LMP1	Courage-Oreca LC70	Judd GV5.5 S2 5.5 L V10	CAT	MNZ	SPA	NÜR; 6	SIL		17th	3
2010	Team Oreca-Matmut	LMP1	Peugeot 908 HDi FAP	Peugeot 5.5L Turbo V12 (Diesel)	CAS; 5	SPA; Ret	ALG	HUN	SIL		15th	17
2011	Team Oreca-Matmut	LMP1	Peugeot 908 HDi FAP	Peugeot 5.5L Turbo V12 (Diesel)	LEC	SPA; 10	IMO	SIL	EST		NC	0
2018	TDS Racing	LMP2	Oreca 07	Gibson GK428 4.2 L V8	LEC; 2	MNZ; 2	RBR; 9	SIL	SPA	ALG	10th	38
2020	Algarve Pro Racing	LMP2	Oreca 07	Gibson GK428 4.2 L V8	LEC; 6	SPA; 12	LEC; Ret	MNZ	ALG; 12		20th	9
2021	Realteam Racing	LMP2	Oreca 07	Gibson GK428 4.2 L V8	CAT	RBR	LEC	MNZ; 14	SPA	ALG	NC†	0†

^{†} As Duval was a guest driver, he was ineligible to score points.

Sporting positions
Preceded by Bruce Lorgeré-Roux	Formula Campus France; Champion; 2002	Succeeded by Laurent Groppi
Preceded by Alexandre Prémat	Formula Renault 2000 France; Champion; 2003	Succeeded by Patrick Pilet
Preceded by Tsugio Matsuda	Formula Nippon; Champion; 2009	Succeeded by João Paulo de Oliveira
Preceded by Juichi Wakisaka; André Lotterer	Super GT; GT500 Champion; 2010; With: Takashi Kogure	Succeeded by Ronnie Quintarelli; Masataka Yanagida
Preceded by André Lotterer; Benoît Tréluyer; Marcel Fässler	Winner of the 24 Hours of Le Mans; 2013; With: Tom Kristensen & Allan McNish	Succeeded by André Lotterer; Benoît Tréluyer; Marcel Fässler
Preceded by André Lotterer; Benoît Tréluyer; Marcel Fässler	FIA World Endurance Champion; 2013; With: Tom Kristensen & Allan McNish	Succeeded by Sébastien Buemi; Anthony Davidson
