= Melvin Choo =

Singaporean auto racing driver

Melvin Choo Kwok Ming (born 24 July 1970) is a Singaporean auto racing driver.

== Career ==
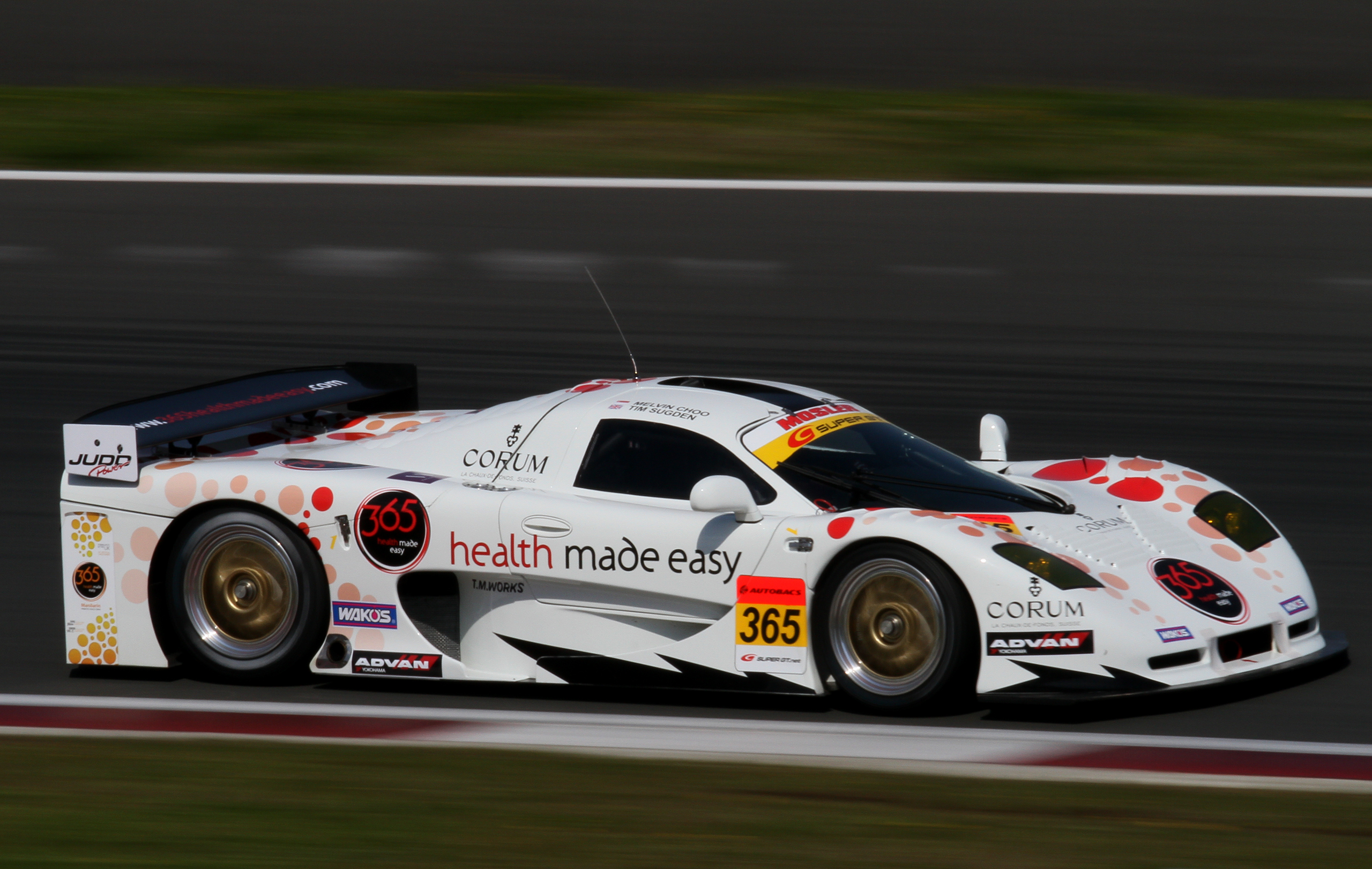
Choo qualifying a Mosler MT900 at the 400km of Fuji in 2010.

Choo competed in the final two rounds of the 2008 FIA World Touring Car Championship, becoming the first driver from Singapore to compete in the WTCC. He drove for the Thunder Asia Racing Team in a BMW 320si with a best placed result of 20th at Okayama Circuit, Japan. He also finished as runner-up in Division Two of the Asian Touring Car Championship in 2008, after finishing third in 2007. Other races participated in 2008 includes the Aston Martin Asia Cup, and finishing as runner-up in Class B of the Porsche Carrera Cup Asia.

In 2009 Super GT season, Choo spot-raced in the Malaysia round for the Thunder Asia Racing with Martin Short and became the first Singaporean driver in the event. Their team finished 13th in GT300 class. He and the team would be fully involved in the 2010 Super GT season, while he was also appointed as the official negotiator of Super GT to promote the event in Singapore, including a possibility to bringing the race to Singapore in future.

=== Complete WTCC results ===
(key) (Races in bold indicate pole position) (Races in italics indicate fastest lap)

Year	Team	Car	1	2	3	4	5	6	7	8	9	10	11		12		Position	Points
2008	ThunderAsia Racing	BMW 320si	CUR (Brazil)	PUE (Mexico)	VAL (Spain)	PAU (France)	BRN (Czech Republic)	EST (Portugal)	BRA (United Kingdom)	OSC (Germany)	IMO (Italy)	MON (Italy)	OKA (Japan)		MAC (Macau)		NC	0
2008	ThunderAsia Racing	BMW 320si											23	20	Ret	Ret	NC	0

=== Complete Super GT results ===
Year	Team	Car	Class	1	2	3	4	5	6	7	8	9	DC	Pts
2009	ThunderAsia Racing	Mosler MT900M	GT300	OKA	SUZ	FUJ	SEP; 13	SUG	SUZ	FUJ	AUT	MOT	NC	0
2010	ThunderAsia Racing	Mosler MT900M	GT300	SUZ	OKA; Ret	FUJ; Ret	SEP; Ret	SUG; Ret	SUZ; 14	FUJ; C	MOT		NC	0
2011	ThunderAsia Racing	Mosler MT900M	GT300	OKA; 16	FUJ; 15	SEP; 15	SUG	SUZ; 18	FUJ; 20	AUT; 19	MOT; 18		NC	0
