= 2009 FIA WTCC Race of Japan =

2009 Race of Japan
Race details
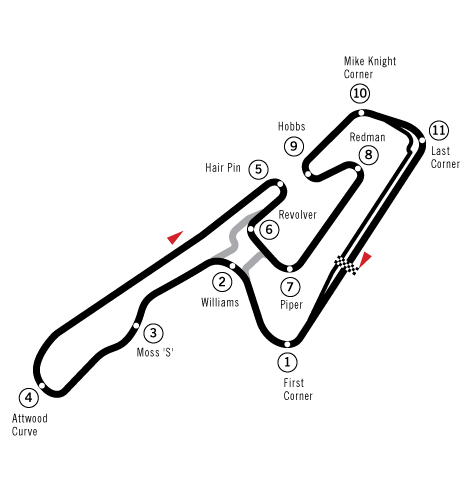
- Round 11 of 12 in the 2009 World Touring Car Championship at Okayama International Circuit in Mimasaka, Japan.
- Date: 1 November, 2009
- Location: Mimasaka, Japan
- Course: Okayama International Circuit; 3.703 kilometres (2.301 mi)

Race One
- Laps: 16
Pole position
Driver		(Italy) Gabriele Tarquini	SEAT Sport
Time		1:37.666	
Podium
First		(United Kingdom) Andy Priaulx	BMW Team UK
Second		(Germany) Jörg Müller	BMW Team Germany
Third		(United Kingdom) Rob Huff	Chevrolet
Fastest Lap
Driver		(Sweden) Rickard Rydell	SEAT Sport
Time		1:51.428	

Race Two
- Laps: 14
Podium
First		(Brazil) Augusto Farfus	BMW Team Germany
Second		(United Kingdom) Andy Priaulx	BMW Team UK
Third		(France) Yvan Muller	SEAT Sport
Fastest Lap
Driver		(United Kingdom) Rob Huff	Chevrolet
Time		1:52.538	

The 2009 FIA WTCC Race of Japan (formally the 2009 FIA WTCC Kenwood Race of Japan) was the eleventh round of the 2009 World Touring Car Championship season and the second running of the FIA WTCC Race of Japan. It was held on 1 November 2009 at the Okayama International Circuit near Mimasaka, Japan. The two races were won by BMW drivers Andy Priaulx and Augusto Farfus. The race was supported by the 2009 1000 km of Okayama, the inaugural event of the Asian Le Mans Series.

== Background ==
Gabriele Tarquini arrived in Japan with a seven-point lead over SEAT Sport teammate Yvan Muller. BMW Team Germany driver Augusto Farfus was the only other driver that could still win the title. He was eighteen points behind Tarquini.

SUNRED Engineering placed Japanese-based Brazilian João Paulo de Oliveira in their third car for the race, taking it over from Andrea Larini. Japanese drivers Seiji Ara and Nobuteru Taniguchi also made their championship debuts, for Wiechers-Sport and Proteam Motorsport respectively, while Masaki Kano returned to Liqui Moly Team Engstler, the team with which he made his series debut in 2008. Macau's Henry Ho also drove for Engstler, making his series debut. Independent SEAT drivers Marin Čolak and Mehdi Bennani did not travel to Japan, while Fabio Fabiani did not follow-up his one-off drive for Proteam at the previous race in Italy.

== Report ==
=== Testing and free practice ===
Yvan Muller was quickest in Friday's test session, ahead of Farfus and the SEAT trio of Tiago Monteiro, Rickard Rydell and Gabriele Tarquini.

Farfus set the fastest time in Saturday morning's free practice session, ahead of fellow BMW driver Andy Priaulx and SEAT drivers Jordi Gené, Yvan Muller and Tiago Monteiro. Stefano D'Aste crashed ten minutes into the session, bringing out the red flags and stopping the session.

Farfus was also the quickest in the second practice session, ahead of BMW Team Germany teammate Jörg Müller and his namesake Yvan. Robert Huff for Chevrolet and Tarquini were fourth and fifth quickest.

=== Qualifying ===
Tarquini took his third straight pole position and his fifth of the season in the qualifying session. He will start ahead of Priaulx, Jörg Müller, Rydell and Farfus. Yvan Muller will start in seventh place. Tom Coronel was the quickest of the Independent runners.

=== Warm-Up ===
Farfus set the quickest time in the Sunday morning warm-up, ahead of Gené, Jörg Müller, Rickard Rydell and Tiago Monteiro.

=== Race One ===
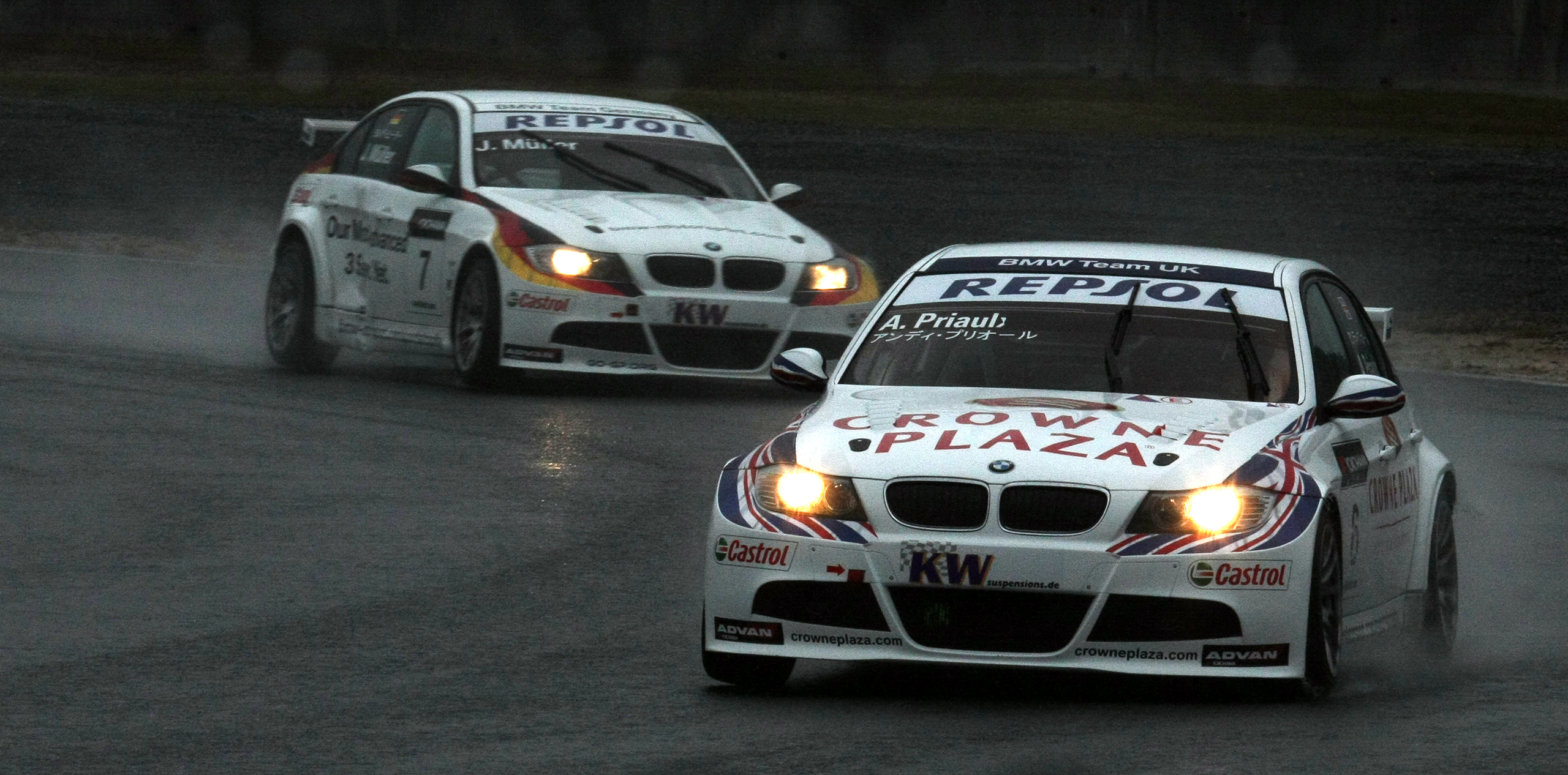
Andy Priaulx leads Jörg Müller during Race One.

A heavy downfall of rain before the first race meant that the field began behind the safety car. The safety car came in at the end of the first lap, with polesitter Tarquini leading the pack. However, he drifted wide at Turn 2 through the gravel trap. This left Priaulx to lead until the end of the race, despite pressure from BMW teammate Jörg Müller. Despite dropping back after his off-track excursion, Tarquini came back through the field to finish in fifth behind Huff and Yvan Muller, ahead of SEAT teammates Gené and Monteiro. Farfus had gone off at the same time as Tarquini on lap 3, but he fought his way through to finish eighth and securing pole position for Race Two after pushing Alain Menu wide on the penultimate lap, continuing his habit this season off recovering from early Race One incidents to finish eighth and start Race Two on pole. Coronel took the Independents' class victory.

=== Race Two ===
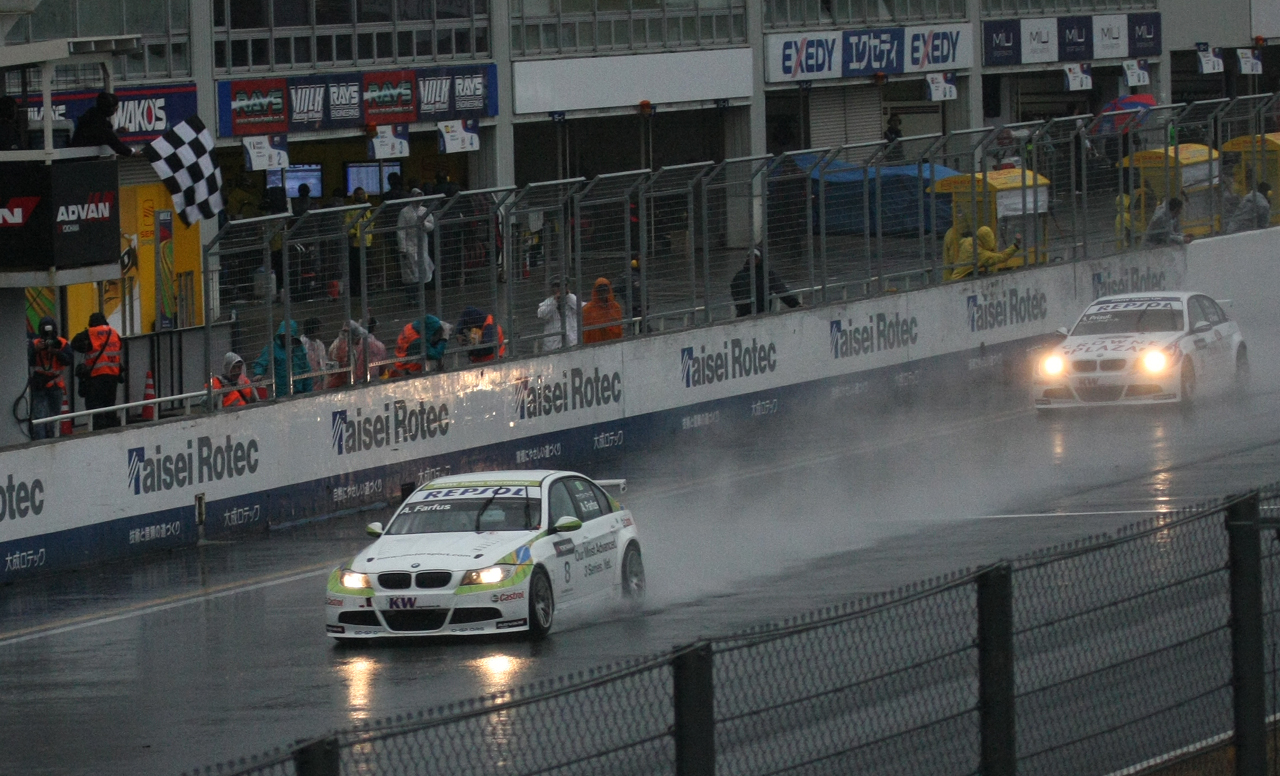
Augusto Farfus won Race Two ahead of Andy Priaulx.

Race Two began with Jörg Müller starting quickly, causing a bunch-up at Turn 1 that resulted in Müller spinning Monteiro off the track. Tarquini joined him in running off, although he was able to rejoin the circuit. Müller received a drive-through penalty for causing the incident. Many other drivers ran wide at Turn 2 in the treacherous conditions. Farfus lead Priaulx home to give another one-two finish for BMW, ahead of Yvan Muller. The three Chevrolets finished next, with Menu ahead of Nicola Larini and Huff. Gené and Rydell sacrificed their positions on the last lap to give teammate Tarquini a seventh-place finish. D'Aste took the Independents' win, finishing tenth overall

== Results ==
=== Qualifying ===
Pos.	No.	Name	Team	Car	C	Q1	Q2
1	2	(Italy) Gabriele Tarquini	SEAT Sport	SEAT León 2.0 TDI		1:38.168	1:37.666
2	6	(United Kingdom) Andy Priaulx	BMW Team UK	BMW 320si		1:38.117	1:37.716
3	7	(Germany) Jörg Müller	BMW Team Germany	BMW 320si		1:37.914	1:37.726
4	3	(Sweden) Rickard Rydell	SEAT Sport	SEAT León 2.0 TDI		1:38.149	1:37.799
5	8	(Brazil) Augusto Farfus	BMW Team Germany	BMW 320si		1:38.323	1:37.826
6	4	(Spain) Jordi Gené	SEAT Sport	SEAT León 2.0 TDI		1:38.017	1:37.835
7	1	(France) Yvan Muller	SEAT Sport	SEAT León 2.0 TDI		1:38.255	1:37.978
8	5	(Portugal) Tiago Monteiro	SEAT Sport	SEAT León 2.0 TDI		1:38.202	1:38.119
9	11	(United Kingdom) Robert Huff	Chevrolet	Chevrolet Cruze LT		1:38.900	1:38.620
10	12	(Switzerland) Alain Menu	Chevrolet	Chevrolet Cruze LT		1:38.460	1:39.110
11	10	(Spain) Sergio Hernández	BMW Team Italy-Spain	BMW 320si		1:39.043	
12	21	(Netherlands) Tom Coronel	SUNRED Engineering	SEAT León 2.0 TFSI	Y	1:39.078	
13	36	(United Kingdom) James Thompson	LADA Sport	Lada Priora		1:39.106	
14	14	(Italy) Nicola Larini	Chevrolet	Chevrolet Cruze LT		1:39.126	
15	23	(Spain) Félix Porteiro	Scuderia Proteam Motorsport	BMW 320si	Y	1:39.159	
16	9	(Italy) Alessandro Zanardi	BMW Team Italy-Spain	BMW 320si		1:39.186	
17	27	(Italy) Stefano D'Aste	Wiechers-Sport	BMW 320si	Y	1:39.395	
18	49	(Japan) Nobuteru Taniguchi	Scuderia Proteam Motorsport	BMW 320si	Y	1:39.469	
19	18	(Netherlands) Jaap van Lagen	LADA Sport	Lada Priora		1:39.498	
20	50	(Japan) Seiji Ara	Wiechers-Sport	BMW 320si	Y	1:39.549	
21	47	(Brazil) João Paulo Lima de Oliveira	SUNRED Engineering	SEAT León 2.0 TFSI	Y	1:39.643	
22	25	(Germany) Franz Engstler	Liqui Moly Team Engstler	BMW 320si	Y	1:39.672	
23	22	(United Kingdom) Tom Boardman	SUNRED Engineering	SEAT León 2.0 TFSI	Y	1:39.823	
24	26	(Denmark) Kristian Poulsen	Liqui Moly Team Engstler	BMW 320si	Y	1:40.112	
25	19	(Russia) Kirill Ladygin	LADA Sport	Lada Priora		1:40.786	
26	51	(Macau) Henry Ho	Liqui Moly Team Engstler	BMW 320si	Y	1:41.536	
27	48	(Japan) Masaki Kano	Liqui Moly Team Engstler	BMW 320si	Y	1:42.427	

=== Race 1 ===
Pos.	No.	Name	Team	Car	C	Laps	Time/Retired	Grid	Points
1	6	(United Kingdom) Andy Priaulx	BMW Team UK	BMW 320si		16	32:18.887	2	10
2	7	(Germany) Jörg Müller	BMW Team Germany	BMW 320si		16	+0.484	3	8
3	11	(United Kingdom) Robert Huff	Chevrolet	Chevrolet Cruze LT		16	+2.552	9	6
4	1	(France) Yvan Muller	SEAT Sport	SEAT León 2.0 TDI		16	+12.066	7	5
5	2	(Italy) Gabriele Tarquini	SEAT Sport	SEAT León 2.0 TDI		16	+15.757	1	4
6	4	(Spain) Jordi Gené	SEAT Sport	SEAT León 2.0 TDI		16	+17.131	6	3
7	5	(Portugal) Tiago Monteiro	SEAT Sport	SEAT León 2.0 TDI		16	+18.693	8	2
8	8	(Brazil) Augusto Farfus	BMW Team Germany	BMW 320si		16	+25.403	5	1
9	12	(Switzerland) Alain Menu	Chevrolet	Chevrolet Cruze LT		16	+28.163	10	
10	21	(Netherlands) Tom Coronel	SUNRED Engineering	SEAT León 2.0 TFSI	Y	16	+30.133	12	
11	36	(United Kingdom) James Thompson	LADA Sport	Lada Priora		16	+30.693	13	
12	14	(Italy) Nicola Larini	Chevrolet	Chevrolet Cruze LT		16	+32.217	14	
13	18	(Netherlands) Jaap van Lagen	LADA Sport	Lada Priora		16	+40.278	19	
14	23	(Spain) Félix Porteiro	Scuderia Proteam Motorsport	BMW 320si	Y	16	+50.587	15	
15	9	(Italy) Alessandro Zanardi	BMW Team Italy-Spain	BMW 320si		16	+55.891	16	
16	19	(Russia) Kirill Ladygin	LADA Sport	Lada Priora		16	+57.180	25	
17	50	(Japan) Seiji Ara	Wiechers-Sport	BMW 320si	Y	16	+58.480	20	
18	22	(United Kingdom) Tom Boardman	SUNRED Engineering	SEAT León 2.0 TFSI	Y	16	+1:05.796	23	
19	26	(Denmark) Kristian Poulsen	Liqui Moly Team Engstler	BMW 320si	Y	16	+1:09.905	24	
20	49	(Japan) Nobuteru Taniguchi	Scuderia Proteam Motorsport	BMW 320si	Y	16	+1:15.829	18	
21	48	(Japan) Masaki Kano	Liqui Moly Team Engstler	BMW 320si	Y	16	+1:28.415	27	
22	51	(Macau) Henry Ho	Liqui Moly Team Engstler	BMW 320si	Y	16	+1:53.615	26	
23	47	(Brazil) João Paulo Lima de Oliveira	SUNRED Engineering	SEAT León 2.0 TFSI	Y	16	1:59.405	21	
24	27	(Italy) Stefano D'Aste	Wiechers-Sport	BMW 320si	Y	15	+1 Lap	17	
25	3	(Sweden) **Rickard Rydell**	SEAT Sport	SEAT León 2.0 TDI		14	+2 Laps	4	
Ret	25	(Germany) Franz Engstler	Liqui Moly Team Engstler	BMW 320si	Y	3	Wheel damage	22	
Ret	10	(Spain) Sergio Hernández	BMW Team Italy-Spain	BMW 320si		2	Race incident	11	

- **Bold** denotes Fastest lap.

=== Race 2 ===
Pos.	No.	Name	Team	Car	C	Laps	Time/Retired	Grid	Points
1	8	(Brazil) Augusto Farfus	BMW Team Germany	BMW 320si		14	26:55.015	1	10
2	6	(United Kingdom) Andy Priaulx	BMW Team UK	BMW 320si		14	+0.761	8	8
3	1	(France) Yvan Muller	SEAT Sport	SEAT León 2.0 TDI		14	+3.298	5	6
4	12	(Switzerland) Alain Menu	Chevrolet	Chevrolet Cruze LT		14	+5.878	9	5
5	14	(Italy) Nicola Larini	Chevrolet	Chevrolet Cruze LT		14	+13.725	27	4
6	11	(United Kingdom) **Robert Huff**	Chevrolet	Chevrolet Cruze LT		14	+17.538	6	3
7	2	(Italy) Gabriele Tarquini	SEAT Sport	SEAT León 2.0 TDI		14	+24.104	4	2
8	3	(Sweden) Rickard Rydell	SEAT Sport	SEAT León 2.0 TDI		14	+26.212	24	1
9	4	(Spain) Jordi Gené	SEAT Sport	SEAT León 2.0 TDI		14	+27.272	3	
10	27	(Italy) Stefano D'Aste	Wiechers-Sport	BMW 320si	Y	14	+35.619	23	
11	23	(Spain) Félix Porteiro	Scuderia Proteam Motorsport	BMW 320si	Y	14	+36.900	13	
12	10	(Spain) Sergio Hernández	BMW Team Italy-Spain	BMW 320si		14	+37.866	26	
13	21	(Netherlands) Tom Coronel	SUNRED Engineering	SEAT León 2.0 TFSI	Y	14	+41.110	10	
14	22	(United Kingdom) Tom Boardman	SUNRED Engineering	SEAT León 2.0 TFSI	Y	14	+58.394	17	
15	25	(Germany) Franz Engstler	Liqui Moly Team Engstler	BMW 320si	Y	14	+1:03.206	25	
16	7	(Germany) Jörg Müller	BMW Team Germany	BMW 320si		14	+1:07.306	7	
17	9	(Italy) Alessandro Zanardi	BMW Team Italy-Spain	BMW 320si		14	+1:10.579	14	
18	50	(Japan) Seiji Ara	Wiechers-Sport	BMW 320si	Y	14	+1:18.816	16	
19	47	(Brazil) João Paulo Lima de Oliveira	SUNRED Engineering	SEAT León 2.0 TFSI	Y	14	+1:19.317	21	
20	48	(Japan) Masaki Kano	Liqui Moly Team Engstler	BMW 320si	Y	14	+1:40.690	20	
Ret	18	(Netherlands) Jaap van Lagen	LADA Sport	Lada Priora		9	Engine	12	
Ret	36	(United Kingdom) James Thompson	LADA Sport	Lada Priora		8	Anti–mist failure	11	
Ret	51	(Macau) Henry Ho	Liqui Moly Team Engstler	BMW 320si	Y	6	Race incident	22	
Ret	26	(Denmark) Kristian Poulsen	Liqui Moly Team Engstler	BMW 320si	Y	6	Race incident	18	
Ret	49	(Japan) Nobuteru Taniguchi	Scuderia Proteam Motorsport	BMW 320si	Y	3	Race incident	19	
Ret	5	(Portugal) Tiago Monteiro	SEAT Sport	SEAT León 2.0 TDI		0	Race incident	2	
DNS	19	(Russia) Kirill Ladygin	LADA Sport	Lada Priora		0	Engine	15	

- **Bold** denotes Fastest lap.

== Standings after the event ==
Drivers' Championship standings

	Pos	Driver	Points
	1	(Italy) Gabriele Tarquini	115
	2	(France) Yvan Muller	113
	3	(Brazil) Augusto Farfus	102
	4	(United Kingdom) Andy Priaulx	84
1	5	(United Kingdom) Robert Huff	69

Yokohama Independents' Trophy standings

	Pos	Driver	Points
	1	(Netherlands) Tom Coronel	212
	2	(Spain) Félix Porteiro	182
1	3	(Italy) Stefano D'Aste	137
1	4	(Germany) Franz Engstler	132
	5	(United Kingdom) Tom Boardman	87

Manufacturers' Championship standings

Pos	Manufacturer	Points
1	(Spain) SEAT	289
2	(Germany) BMW	286
3	(United States) Chevrolet	193
4	(Russia) Lada	81

- Note: Only the top five positions are included for both sets of drivers' standings.
