= Kondo Racing =

Japanese racing team

(Japan) Kondo Racing
- Founded: 2000
- Base: Gotemba, Shizuoka
- Team principal(s): Masahiko Kondo
- Founder(s): Masahiko Kondo
- Current series: Super Formula; Super GT
- Former series: Super Taikyu; Nürburgring 24 Hours
- Current drivers: Super Formula: (United Kingdom) Luke Browning; (Japan) Ukyo Sasahara; Super GT - GT500: (Japan) Teppei Natori; (Japan) Atsushi Miyake; Super GT - GT300: (Brazil) João Paulo de Oliveira; (Japan) Iori Kimura
- Teams' Championships: Super Formula: 1 (2018); Super GT GT300: 3 (2020, 2022, 2026)
- Drivers' Championships: Super GT GT300: 2020: Kiyoto Fujinami, João Paulo de Oliveira; 2022: Kiyoto Fujinami, João Paulo de Oliveira; 2026: João Paulo de Oliveira, Iori Kimura
- Website: kondo-racing.jp

Kondo Racing is an automobile racing team founded, owned and headed by Masahiko Kondo. The operating body is MK Company Co., Ltd. MK is an abbreviation for Masahiko Kondo. The team competes in Super Formula as well as in Super GT in both the GT500 and GT300 classes.

== History ==
Kondo Racing was founded in 2000 by Japanese pop star Masahiko Kondo, also known as "Matchy". Kondo himself had raced for many years since the late 1980s and throughout the 1990s. In 1998 Kondo launched "Masahiko Kondo Racing Project" together with Teams TMS, a team with which he raced at the time, to compete in the Japanese Formula 3 Championship in 1998 and 1999. While working to develop young drivers, Kondo himself learned how of run a racing team as a team manager. Based on that experience, in 2000 he established the "Kondo Racing Team" and began participating in Formula Nippon.

=== Super Formula ===
In 2000, Kondo Racing began competing in Formula Nippon, the premier Japanese open-wheel series, and the team has continued racing in the series ever since, with the series having rebranded as Super Formula in 2013. Since 2006, Kondo Racing has raced with Toyota engines. The team has not won a drivers' championship title, but came second overall with Nick Cassidy in 2018 and with Sacha Fenestraz in 2022. Kenta Yamashita has been one of the long standing driver for Kondo's Super Formula, as he has competed since 2017 with one win to his name, along with couple of podiums. For 2024 Yamashita, paired once again with last season's driver Kazuto Kotaka.

=== Super GT – GT500 ===
Kondo Racing entered Super GT in the top GT500 class with Nissan in 2006. From the first year, Yokohama Tire joined Kondo till now. Also with the introduction of a strong lineup of former F1 driver Eric Comas and Nissan's own driver Masataka Yanagida. Since there was no data available, the first priority was to develop tires. Comas temporarily withdrew due to back pain and was replaced by Seiji Ara. Although Comas returned for the sixth race, he was unable to regain his form and was forced to stay out for the rest of the season, leaving Ara to team up with Yanagida until the final race. In the final race, he fought for 2nd place with some help from his machine, and then finished in 3rd place, earning his long-awaited first podium. Throughout the years the team has won several races, but has never been a serious championship contender.

=== Super GT – GT300 ===
Since 2012, it has been participating in the Super Taikyu together with five Nissan Automobile College schools (Tochigi, Yokohama, Aichi, Kyoto, and Ehime). Kondo Racing also participated in the Nürburgring 24 endurance race with a Nissan GT-R NISMO GT3, marking the team’s first overseas competition. Kondo’s Nurburgring 24 driver lineup was Tsugio Matsuda, Mitsunori Takaboshi, Tomonobu Fujii and Tom Coronel.

In 2019, Kondo Racing entered the GT300 class of Super GT with Kazuki Hiramine and Sacha Fenestraz as their drivers in the class in the second-generation Nissan GT-R NISMO GT3. The pair came close to winning the fourth round in Buriram, battling for the win until the final lap, but ultimately finished second.

In 2020, Kondo Racing won its first titles in the category with the driver pairing of Kiyoto Fujinami & João Paulo de Oliveira. After being in title contention again in 2021, the team returned to the top of the standings in 2022, clinching the titles after their main rivals lost a decisive position on the final lap of the last race. For 2023, de Oliveira stayed with the team, while Fujinami was replaced by Teppei Natori after he was reportedly involved in a physical altercation with another driver in the smaller Vita Pro series.

== Race results ==
=== Complete Super GT results ===
(key) (Races in bold indicate pole position) (Races in italics indicate fastest lap)

Year	Car	Tyres	Class	No.	Drivers	1	2	3	4	5	6	7	8	9	10	Pos	Points
2006	Nissan Fairlady Z	Y	GT500	24	(Japan) Masataka Yanagida (France) Érik Comas (Japan) Seiji Ara	SUZ; 10	OKA; 10	FUJ; 10	SEP; 8	SUG; 10	SUZ; 5	MOT; 6	AUT; 14	FUJ; 3		12th	33
2007	Nissan Fairlady Z	Y	GT500	24	(Brazil) João Paulo de Oliveira (Japan) Seiji Ara	SUZ; Ret	OKA; 15	FUJ; Ret	SEP; 1	SUG; 10	SUZ; 10	MOT; 5	AUT; Ret	FUJ; 5		12th	47
2008	Nissan GT-R	Y	GT500	24	(Brazil) João Paulo de Oliveira (Japan) Seiji Ara	SUZ; 5	OKA; 8	FUJ; 11	SEP; 1	SUG; 8	SUZ; 7	MOT; 14	AUT; 16	FUJ; 15		11th	56
2009	Nissan GT-R	Y	GT500	24	(Brazil) João Paulo de Oliveira (Japan) Seiji Ara	OKA; 1	SUZ; 8	FUJ; 4	SEP; 5	SUG; 13	SUZ; 11	FUJ; 13	AUT; 3	MOT; 11		7th	69
2010	Nissan GT-R	Y	GT500	24	(Brazil) João Paulo de Oliveira (Japan) Hironobu Yasuda	SUZ; 1	OKA; 12	FUJ; 8	SEP; 9	SUG; 5	SUZ; Ret	FUJ; C	MOT; 10	NC1; 4	NC2; 10	10th	48
2011	Nissan GT-R	Y	GT500	24	(Japan) Hironobu Yasuda (Sweden) Björn Wirdheim	OKA; 9	FUJ; 7	SEP; 4	SUG; 4	SUZ; 10	FUJ; 11	AUT; 5	MOT; 12	NC1; Ret	NC2; 9	11th	50
2012	Nissan GT-R	Y	GT500	24	(Japan) Hironobu Yasuda (Sweden) Björn Wirdheim	OKA; 11	FUJ; 14	SEP; Ret	SUG; 10	SUZ; 3	FUJ; 13	AUT; 4	MOT; 11	NC1; 9	NC2; 5	14th	38
2013	Nissan GT-R	Y	GT500	24	(Japan) Hironobu Yasuda (Germany) Michael Krumm	OKA; 13	FUJ; 12	SEP; 13	SUG; 5	SUZ; Ret	FUJ; 10	AUT; 6	MOT; 9	NC1; 10	NC2; 10	13th	32
2014	Nissan GT-R	Y	GT500	24	(Germany) Michael Krumm (Japan) Daiki Sasaki	OKA; 12	FUJ; 4	AUT; 13	SUG; 10	FUJ; 15	SUZ; 9	**BUR**; 2	MOT; 4			8th	51
2015	Nissan GT-R	Y	GT500	24	(Japan) Daiki Sasaki (Spain) Lucas Ordóñez (Germany) Michael Krumm	OKA; 11	FUJ; 11	CHA; Ret	FUJ; 1	SUZ; 13	SUG; 3	AUT; 15	MOT; 12			12th	43
2016	Nissan GT-R	Y	GT500	24	(Japan) Daiki Sasaki (Japan) Masataka Yanagida	OKA; 13	FUJ; 9	SUG; 1	FUJ; Ret	SUZ; 12	CHA; 13	MOT; 1	MOT; 10			7th	57
2017	Nissan GT-R	Y	GT500	24	(Japan) Daiki Sasaki (Brazil) João Paulo de Oliveira	OKA; 10	FUJ; 12	AUT; 9	SUG; Ret	FUJ; 13	**SUZ**; 5	CHA; Ret	MOT; 12			14th	24
2018	Nissan GT-R	Y	GT500	24	(Brazil) João Paulo de Oliveira (Japan) Mitsunori Takaboshi	OKA; 6	FUJ; 13	SUZ; 9	CHA; Ret	FUJ; 6	SUG; 6	AUT; 7	MOT; 10			12th	42
2019	Nissan GT-R	Y	GT500	24	(Japan) Mitsunori Takaboshi (United Kingdom) Jann Mardenborough	OKA; 5	FUJ; 14	SUZ; 8	BUR; 4	FUJ; Ret	AUT; 9	SUG; 15	MOT; 10	NC1; 17	NC2; 12	13th	34
2019	Nissan GT-R Nismo GT3	Y	GT300	56	(Japan) Kazuki Hiramine (France) Sacha Fenestraz	OKA; 5	**FUJ**; 4	SUZ; 18	BUR; 2	FUJ; 7	AUT; 8	SUG; 5	MOT; 6	NC1	NC2	5th	69
2020	Nissan GT-R	Y	GT500	24	(Japan) Mitsunori Takaboshi (United Kingdom) Jann Mardenborough	FUJ; 10	FUJ; 12	SUZ; 11	MOT; 13	FUJ; 14	SUZ; 8	MOT; 14	FUJ; 13			15th	19
2020	Nissan GT-R Nismo GT3	Y	GT300	56	(Japan) Kiyoto Fujinami (Brazil) João Paulo de Oliveira	FUJ; 4	FUJ; 5	SUZ; 9	MOT; 20	FUJ; 1	SUZ; 16	MOT; 1	FUJ; 2			1st	95
2021	Nissan GT-R	Y	GT500	24	(Japan) Mitsunori Takaboshi (Japan) Daiki Sasaki	OKA; 14	FUJ; 12	MOT; 12	SUZ; 3	SUG; 6	AUT; 14	MOT; 7	FUJ; 11			13th	40
2021	Nissan GT-R Nismo GT3	Y	GT300	56	(Japan) Kiyoto Fujinami (Brazil) João Paulo de Oliveira	OKA; 1	FUJ; 7	MOT; 26	SUZ; 8	SUG; 3	AUT; 11	MOT; 3	FUJ; 5			2nd	77
2022	Nissan Z	Y	GT500	24	(Japan) Daiki Sasaki (Japan) Kohei Hirate	OKA; 14	FUJ; 8	SUZ; 6	FUJ; 3	SUZ; 10	SUG; 14	**AUT**; 3	MOT; Ret			10th	46
2022	Nissan GT-R Nismo GT3	Y	GT300	56	(Japan) Kiyoto Fujinami (Brazil) João Paulo de Oliveira	OKA; 1	FUJ; 7	SUZ; 3	FUJ; 6	SUZ; 13	SUG; 4	AUT; 5	MOT; 19			1st	74.5
2023	Nissan Z	Y	GT500	24	(Japan) Daiki Sasaki (Japan) Kohei Hirate	OKA; 14	FUJ; 15	SUZ; 8	**FUJ**; 10	SUZ; 13	SUG; 5	AUT; 12	MOT; 14			15th	25
2023	Nissan GT-R Nismo GT3	Y	GT300	56	(Brazil) João Paulo de Oliveira (Japan) Teppei Natori	OKA; 10	**FUJ**; 1	SUZ; 4	FUJ; 4	SUZ; Ret	SUG; 10	AUT; 5	MOT; 6			3rd	70
2024	Nissan Z	Y	GT500	24	(Japan) Tsugio Matsuda (Japan) Teppei Natori	OKA; 12	FUJ; 13	SUZ; 9	FUJ; 14	SUG; 13	**AUT**; 12†	MOT; 8	SUZ; 15			14th	22
2024	Nissan GT-R Nismo GT3	Y	GT300	56	(Japan) Daiki Sasaki (Brazil) João Paulo de Oliveira	OKA; 15	FUJ; 2	SUZ; 16	FUJ; 3	SUG; 11	AUT; 12	MOT; 8	SUZ; Ret			6th	49
2025	Nissan Z	Y	GT500	24	(Japan) Tsugio Matsuda (Japan) Teppei Natori	OKA; 11†	FUJ; 15	SEP; Ret	FS1; 12	FS2; 10	SUZ; 13	SUG; 1	AUT; Ret	MOT; 10		15th	35.5
2025	Nissan GT-R Nismo GT3	Y	GT300	56	(Japan) Kohei Hirate (Brazil) João Paulo de Oliveira (Japan) Yu Kanamaru	OKA; 3	FUJ; 7	SEP; 10	FS1; 11	FS2; 10	SUZ; 8	SUG; 2	AUT; 4	MOT; 4		2nd	106
2026	Nissan Z	Y	GT500	24	(Japan) Teppei Natori (Japan) Atsushi Miyake	OKA; 9	FUJ1; 6	FUJ2; 11	SUZ; 7	SUG; 7	AUT; 11	MOT1; 9	MOT2; 8			12th	44
2026	Nissan GT-R Nismo GT3	Y	GT300	56	(Brazil) João Paulo de Oliveira (Japan) Iori Kimura	OKA; 14	FUJ1; 1	FUJ2; 5	SUZ; 5	SUG; 2	AUT; 12	MOT1; 14	MOT2; 4			1st	112

^{‡} Half points awarded as less than 75% of race distance was completed. * Season still in progress.

Note: Non-championship races (NC1, NC2) are major races that do not count towards the championship.

=== Complete Japanese Top Formula racing results ===
(key) (Races in bold indicate pole position) (Races in italics indicate fastest lap)

Year	Chassis	Engine	Tyres	No.	Drivers	1	2	3	4	5	6	7	8	9	10	11	12	D.C.	Pts	T.C.	Pts
Formula Nippon
2000	Reynard 99L	Mugen MF308	B	3	(Japan) Masahiko Kondo	SUZ; 7	MOT; 14	MIN; Ret	FUJ; 13	SUZ; 13	SUG; 7	MOT; Ret	FUJ; Ret	MIN; 11	SUZ; 10			15th	0	10th	0
2000	G-Force GF03	Mugen MF308	B	4	(Japan) Takeshi Tsuchiya	SUZ	MOT	MIN	FUJ	SUZ	SUG	MOT	FUJ	MIN; 10	SUZ			21st	0	10th	0
2001	Reynard 99L	Mugen MF308	B	3	(Japan) Yuji Tachikawa	SUZ; 13	MOT; 2	MIN; 11	FUJ; Ret	SUZ; 4	SUG; 4	FUJ; 2	MIN; 3	MOT; 5	SUZ; 2			3rd	30	5th	34
2001	Reynard 99L	Mugen MF308	B	4	(Japan) Katsutomo Kaneishi	SUZ; 7	MOT; 6	MIN; Ret	FUJ; 4	SUZ; Ret	SUG; 9	FUJ; 11	MIN; Ret	MOT; 11	SUZ; 13			13th	4	5th	34
2002	Reynard 99L	Mugen MF308	B	3	(Japan) Seiji Ara	SUZ; 8	FUJ; 4	MIN; 9	SUZ; 10	MOT; Ret	SUG; Ret	FUJ; NC	MIN; 9	MOT; 11	SUZ; 10			11th	3	7th	3
2002	Reynard 99L; Reynard 2KL	Mugen MF308	B	4	(Japan) Katsutomo Kaneishi	SUZ; Ret	FUJ; Ret	MIN; 4	SUZ; 6	MOT; 5	SUG; 6	FUJ; 5	MIN; 5	MOT; Ret	SUZ; 7			7th	11	7th	3
2003	Lola B03/51	Mugen MF308	B	3	(Japan) Yuji Tachikawa	SUZ; 10	FUJ; 12	MIN; 10	MOT; Ret	SUZ; Ret	SUG; NC	FUJ; Ret	MIN; Ret	MOT; 8	SUZ; Ret			18th	0	10th	0
2003	Lola B03/51	Mugen MF308	B	4	(Germany) Dominik Schwager	SUZ; Ret	FUJ; Ret	MIN; Ret	MOT; 8	SUZ; 9	SUG; 11	FUJ; 7	MIN; 8	MOT; 10	SUZ; 8			16th	0	10th	0
2004	Lola B3/51	Mugen MF308	B	3	(Japan) Ryō Michigami	SUZ; 3	SUG; 5	MOT; 6	SUZ; Ret	SUG; Ret	MIN; 11	SEP; 8	MOT; 10	SUZ; 13				10th	7	6th	10
2004	Lola B3/51	Mugen MF308	B	4	(Japan) Yuji Tachikawa	SUZ; Ret	SUG; NC	MOT; Ret	SUZ; 6	SUG; 5	MIN; 9	SEP; Ret	MOT; 7	SUZ; 9				14th	3	6th	10
2005	Lola B3/51	Mugen MF308	B	3	(Japan) Sakon Yamamoto	MOT; 14	SUZ; Ret	SUG; Ret	FUJ; Ret	SUZ; 4	MIN; 8	FUJ; Ret	MOT; 2	SUZ; 11				10th	9	4th	21
2005	Lola B3/51	Mugen MF308	B	4	(Czech Republic) Jaroslav Janiš	MOT; 12	SUZ; 7	SUG; 7										14th	0	4th	21
2005	Lola B3/51	Mugen MF308	B	4	(Italy) Ronnie Quintarelli				FUJ; 5	SUZ; 5	MIN; 2	FUJ; Ret	MOT; 5	SUZ; 10				9th	12	4th	21
2006	Lola FN06	Toyota RV8J	B	3	(Japan) Sakon Yamamoto	FUJ; 6	SUZ; 4	MOT; 14										11th	3.5	10th	4.5
2006	Lola FN06	Toyota RV8J	B	3	(Japan) Seiji Ara				SUZ; 10	AUT; 10	FUJ; 18	SUG; 13	MOT; Ret	SUZ; Ret				20th	0	10th	4.5
2006	Lola FN06	Toyota RV8J	B	4	(Japan) Masataka Yanagida	FUJ; 7	SUZ; Ret	MOT; 9	SUZ; 13	AUT; 13	FUJ; 12	SUG; Ret	MOT; 6	SUZ; 13				15th	1	10th	4.5
2007	Lola FN06	Toyota RV8J	B	3	(Japan) Masataka Yanagida	FUJ; 9	SUZ; 18	MOT; Ret	OKA; 15	SUZ; 14	FUJ; 12	SUG; 12	MOT; 16	SUZ; Ret				19th	0	7th	18
2007	Lola FN06	Toyota RV8J	B	4	(Brazil) João Paulo de Oliveira	FUJ; DSQ	SUZ; 14	MOT; 8	OKA; 4	SUZ; 7	FUJ; 6	SUG; Ret	MOT; 8	SUZ; 3				8th	18	7th	18
2008	Lola FN06	Honda HF386E	B	3	(Japan) Naoki Yokomizo	FUJ; NC	SUZ; 6	MOT; 11	OKA; 6	SUZ; 7	SUZ; 6	MOT; Ret	MOT; 11	FUJ; 12	FUJ; 12	SUG; Ret		12th	12	5th	44
2008	Lola FN06	Honda HF386E	B	4	(Brazil) João Paulo de Oliveira	FUJ; Ret	SUZ; Ret	MOT; 9	OKA; 11	SUZ; 4	SUZ; 5	MOT; 3	MOT; 3	**FUJ**; 1	FUJ; 8	SUG; 6		6th	33	5th	44
2010	Swift 017.n	Toyota RV8K	B	3	(Japan) Tsugio Matsuda	SUZ	MOT	FUJ	MOT; Ret	SUG; 8	AUT; Ret	SUZ; 14	SUZ; 9	FUJ‡ 11	FUJ‡ 10			15th	1	9th	1
2011	Swift 017.n	Toyota RV8K	B	3	(Italy) Andrea Caldarelli	SUZ; Ret	AUT; Ret	FUJ; 13	MOT; 13	SUZ; C	SUG; 9	MOT; Ret	MOT; Ret	FUJ‡ 9				16th	0	11th	0
2012	Swift 017.n	Toyota RV8K	B	3	(Japan) Hironobu Yasuda	SUZ; 11	MOT; 12	AUT; 13	FUJ; 16	MOT; 9	SUG; 11	SUZ; 13	SUZ; 9	FUJ‡ 16				14th	0	10th	0
Super Formula
2013	Swift SF13	Toyota RV8K	B	3	(Japan) Hironobu Yasuda	SUZ; 14	AUT; 9	FUJ; 12	MOT; Ret	SUG; 6	SUZ; 8	SUZ; 13	FUJ‡ 11					14th	3.5	9th	3.5
2014	Dallara SF14	Toyota RI4A	B	3	(United Kingdom) James Rossiter	SUZ; 2	FUJ; 6	FUJ; 17	FUJ; 8	MOT; 8	AUT; 5	SUG; 4	SUZ; 6	SUZ; 10				6th	22	5th	22
2015	Dallara SF14	Toyota RI4A	B	3	(United Kingdom) James Rossiter	SUZ; 16	OKA; Ret	FUJ; 7	MOT; 12	AUT; 6	SUG; 14	SUZ; Ret	SUZ; Ret					12th	5	8th	5
2015	Dallara SF14	Toyota RI4A	B	4	(United Kingdom) William Buller	SUZ; 14	OKA; 13	FUJ; 14	MOT; 13	AUT; 18	SUG; 15	SUZ; 13	SUZ; 13					19th	0	8th	5
2016	Dallara SF14	Toyota RI4A	Y	3	(United Kingdom) James Rossiter	SUZ; 6	OKA; 9	FUJ; 5	MOT; 5	OKA; 9	OKA; 10	SUG; 8	SUZ; 12	SUZ; 15				10th	12	8th	12
2016	Dallara SF14	Toyota RI4A	Y	4	(United Kingdom) William Buller	SUZ; 15	OKA; 11	FUJ; Ret	MOT; 13	OKA; 15	OKA; 15	SUG; 10	SUZ; 13	SUZ; 13				19th	0	8th	12
2017	Dallara SF14	Toyota RI4A	Y	3	(New Zealand) Nick Cassidy	SUZ; 17	OKA; 3	OKA; 11	FUJ; Ret	MOT; 5	AUT; Ret	**SUG**; 19	SUZ; C	SUZ; C				10th	8	7th	12.5
2017	Dallara SF14	Toyota RI4A	Y	4	(Japan) Kenta Yamashita	SUZ; 14	OKA; 7	OKA; 6	FUJ; Ret	**MOT**; 6	AUT; 13	SUG; 11	SUZ; C	SUZ; C				11th	6.5	7th	12.5
2018	Dallara SF14	Toyota RI4A	Y	3	(New Zealand) Nick Cassidy	SUZ; 7	AUT; C	SUG; 2	**FUJ**; 1	MOT; 3	OKA; 5	SUZ; 2						2nd	37	1st	47.5
2018	Dallara SF14	Toyota RI4A	Y	4	(Japan) Kenta Yamashita	SUZ; 9	AUT; C	SUG; 8	FUJ; 18	MOT; 6	OKA; 6	SUZ; 3						9th	11.5	1st	47.5
2019	Dallara SF19	Toyota RI4A	Y	3	(Japan) Kenta Yamashita	SUZ; 3	AUT; 7	SUG; 6	FUJ; 17	MOT; 13	OKA; 1	SUZ; 9						5th	21	6th	25
2019	Dallara SF19	Toyota RI4A	Y	4	(Japan) Yuji Kunimoto	SUZ; 6	**AUT**; 16	SUG; 8	FUJ; 15	MOT; 10	OKA; 16	SUZ; 15						17th	5	6th	25
2020	Dallara SF19	Toyota RI4A	Y	3	(Japan) Kenta Yamashita	MOT; 2		SUG; 6	AUT; 5	SUZ; 9	SUZ; 6	FUJ; 10						7th	34	6th	46
2020	Dallara SF19	Toyota RI4A	Y	3	(Japan) Sena Sakaguchi		OKA; DNS											NC	0	6th	46
2020	Dallara SF19	Toyota RI4A	Y	4	(France) Sacha Fenestraz	MOT; 3	OKA; Ret	SUG; Ret	AUT; Ret	SUZ; 10	SUZ; Ret	FUJ; 8						13th	19	6th	46
2021	Dallara SF19	Toyota RI4A	Y	3	(Japan) Kenta Yamashita	FUJ; 12	SUZ; 12	AUT; 11	SUG; 14	MOT; 15	MOT; 8	SUZ; 6						14th	8	9th	12
2021	Dallara SF19	Toyota RI4A	Y	4	(Japan) Yuichi Nakayama	FUJ; 14	SUZ; 14	AUT; 15	SUG; Ret	MOT; 13								23rd	0	9th	12
2021	Dallara SF19	Toyota RI4A	Y	4	(France) Sacha Fenestraz						MOT; 13	SUZ; 7						17th	4	9th	12
2022	Dallara SF19	Toyota RI4A	Y	3	(Japan) Kenta Yamashita	FUJ; 11	FUJ; 4	SUZ; 16	AUT; 12	SUG; Ret	FUJ; 7	MOT; 6	MOT; Ret	SUZ; 14	SUZ; 13			15th	19	3rd	99
2022	Dallara SF19	Toyota RI4A	Y	4	(France) Sacha Fenestraz	FUJ; 3	FUJ; 20	SUZ; 4	AUT; 2	SUG; 1	FUJ; Ret	MOT; 2	MOT; 6	SUZ; 16	SUZ; 4			2nd	89	3rd	99
2023	Dallara SF23	Toyota TRD-01F	Y	3	(Japan) Kenta Yamashita	FUJ; Ret	FUJ; 3	SUZ; 5	AUT; 4	SUG; 8	FUJ; 17	MOT; 9	SUZ; 11	SUZ; 9				8th	32	6th	42
2023	Dallara SF23	Toyota TRD-01F	Y	4	(Japan) Kazuto Kotaka	FUJ; 10	FUJ; 14	SUZ; 7	AUT; 19	SUG; 14	FUJ; 14	MOT; 6	SUZ; 15	SUZ; 12				15th	10	6th	42
2024	Dallara SF23	Toyota TRD-01F	Y	3	(Japan) Kenta Yamashita	SUZ; 2	AUT; 7	SUG; 6	FUJ; 13	**MOT**; 2	FUJ; 10	FUJ; 8	SUZ; 8	SUZ; 9				7th	48.5	6th	50
2024	Dallara SF23	Toyota TRD-01F	Y	4	(Japan) Kazuto Kotaka	SUZ; Ret	AUT; 18	SUG; 8	FUJ; 17	MOT; 8	FUJ; 16	FUJ; 12	SUZ; Ret	SUZ; 19				14th	4.5	6th	50
2025	Dallara SF23	Toyota TRD-01F	Y	3	(Japan) Kenta Yamashita	SUZ; 9	SUZ; 11	MOT; 7	**MOT**; 13	AUT; 3	FUJ; 12	FUJ; 8	SUG; 9	FUJ; 10	SUZ; 11	SUZ; 14	SUZ; 14	11th	27.5	7th	29.5
2025	Dallara SF23	Toyota TRD-01F	Y	4	(United Kingdom) Zak O'Sullivan	SUZ; 8	SUZ; 22†	MOT; 12	MOT; 11	AUT; Ret	FUJ; 14	FUJ; 16	SUG; 7	FUJ; 11	SUZ; Ret	SUZ; 20	SUZ; 17	15th	7	7th	29.5

‡ Non-championship round, with no points awarded.

=== 24 Hours of Le Mans results ===
Year	Entrant	No.	Car	Drivers	Class	Laps	Pos.	Class Pos.
2002	(Japan) Kondo Racing	9	Dome S101	(Japan) Masahiko Kondo (United Kingdom) Ian McKellar Jr. (France) François Migault	LMP900	182	DNF	DNF
2003	(Japan) Kondo Racing	9	Dome S101	(Japan) Ryo Fukuda (Japan) Ukyo Katayama (Japan) Masahiko Kondo	LMP900	322	13th	8th
2004	(Japan) Kondo Racing	9	Dome S101	(Japan) Ryo Fukuda (Japan) Hiroki Katoh (Japan) Ryo Michigami	LMP1	206	DNF	DNF

=== 24 Hours of Nürburgring results ===
Year	Entrant	No.	Car	Drivers	Class	Laps	Pos.	Class Pos.
2025	(Japan) Realize Kondo Racing with Rinaldi	45	Ferrari 296 GT3	(Germany) Felipe Fernández Laser (Zimbabwe) Axcil Jefferies (France) Thomas Neubauer (South Africa) David Perel	SP9 Pro	115	DNF	DNF
2026	(Japan) Realize Kondo Racing with Rinaldi	45	Ferrari 296 GT3 Evo	(Germany) Dennis Marschall (France) Thomas Neubauer (South Africa) David Perel (Netherlands) Thierry Vermeulen	SP9 Pro	14	DNF	DNF
