= 2005 Japanese Formula 3 Championship =

Seasons
- ← 2004 2006 →

The 2005 Japanese Formula 3 Championship was the 26th edition of the Japanese Formula 3 Championship. It began on 2 April at Motegi and ended on 23 October at the same place. Brazilian driver João Paulo de Oliveira took the championship title, winning seven from 20 races.

== Teams and drivers ==
- All teams were Japanese-registered. All cars used Bridgestone tyres.

| Team | No | Driver | Chassis | Engine | Rounds |
|---|---|---|---|---|---|
| Inging | 1 | (Brazil) Roberto Streit | Dome F107 | Torii-Toyota 3S-GE | All |
| Inging | 3 | (Japan) Hideto Yasuoka | Dome F107 | Torii-Toyota 3S-GE | 1–2, 4–10 |
| Inging | 3 | (Japan) Hiroki Katoh | Dome F107 | Torii-Toyota 3S-GE | 3 |
| Inging | 5 | (New Zealand) Jonny Reid | Dome F107 | Torii-Toyota 3S-GE | 1–9 |
| Inging | 5 | (Japan) Hiroki Katoh | Dome F107 | Torii-Toyota 3S-GE | 10 |
| Toda Racing | 2 | (Japan) Yasuhiro Takasaki | Dome F107 | Toda-Honda MF204C | All |
| M-TEC | 10 | (Japan) Hideki Mutoh | Dome F107 | Mugen-Honda MF204C | All |
| M-TEC | 16 | (Japan) Koudai Tsukakoshi | Lola-Dome F106 | Mugen-Honda MF204C | 8–10 |
| Dream Factory | 11 | (Japan) Hironari Kawachi | Lola-Dome F106 | Toda-Honda MF204C | 7–10 |
| ThreeBond Racing | 12 | (Japan) Naoki Yokomizo | Dallara F305 | ThreeBond Nissan SR20VE | All |
| ThreeBond Racing | 14 | (Italy) Paolo Montin | Dallara F305 | ThreeBond Nissan SR20VE | All |
| DTM | 19 | (Japan) Ryo Orime | Dallara F304 | Toyota-TOM'S 3S-GE | All |
| Now Motor Sports | 33 | (Japan) Taku Banba | Dallara F305 | Toyota-TOM'S 3S-GE | All |
| TOM'S | 36 | (Brazil) João Paulo de Oliveira | Dallara F305 | Toyota-TOM'S 3S-GE | All |
| TOM'S | 37 | (Japan) Kazuki Nakajima | Dallara F305 | Toyota-TOM'S 3S-GE | All |
| TOM'S | 38 | (Japan) Daisuke Ikeda | Dallara F305 | Toyota-TOM'S 3S-GE | All |
| Zap Speed | 50 | (Japan) Motohiko Isozaki | Dallara F305 | Toyota-TOM'S 3S-GE | All |
| Le Beausset Motorsports | 62 | (Japan) Koki Saga | Dallara F305 | Toyota-TOM'S 3S-GE | All |

== Race calendar and results ==
| Round | | Circuit | Date | Pole position | Fastest lap | Winning driver | Winning team |
|---|---|---|---|---|---|---|---|
| 1 | R1 | Twin Ring Motegi, Motegi | 2 April | (Brazil) João Paulo de Oliveira | (Brazil) João Paulo de Oliveira | (Brazil) João Paulo de Oliveira | TOM'S |
| 1 | R2 | Twin Ring Motegi, Motegi | 3 April | (Brazil) João Paulo de Oliveira | (Japan) Hideki Mutoh | (Japan) Hideki Mutoh | M-TEC |
| 2 | R1 | Suzuka Circuit, Suzuka | 16 April | (Japan) Daisuke Ikeda | (Brazil) João Paulo de Oliveira | (Brazil) João Paulo de Oliveira | TOM'S |
| 2 | R2 | Suzuka Circuit, Suzuka | 17 April | (Brazil) João Paulo de Oliveira | (Brazil) João Paulo de Oliveira | (Japan) Hideki Mutoh | M-TEC |
| 3 | R1 | Sportsland SUGO, Murata | 14 May | (Japan) Naoki Yokomizo | (New Zealand) Jonny Reid | (Japan) Naoki Yokomizo | ThreeBond Racing |
| 3 | R2 | Sportsland SUGO, Murata | 15 May | (Japan) Naoki Yokomizo | (Brazil) João Paulo de Oliveira | (Japan) Naoki Yokomizo | ThreeBond Racing |
| 4 | R1 | Fuji Speedway, Oyama | 4 June | (Japan) Naoki Yokomizo | (Japan) Kazuki Nakajima | (Brazil) João Paulo de Oliveira | TOM'S |
| 4 | R2 | Fuji Speedway, Oyama | 5 June | (Japan) Kazuki Nakajima | (Brazil) João Paulo de Oliveira | (Brazil) João Paulo de Oliveira | TOM'S |
| 5 | R1 | Okayama International Circuit | 18 June | (Brazil) João Paulo de Oliveira | (Brazil) João Paulo de Oliveira | (Italy) Paolo Montin | ThreeBond Racing |
| 5 | R2 | Okayama International Circuit | 19 June | (Brazil) João Paulo de Oliveira | (Brazil) João Paulo de Oliveira | (Japan) Naoki Yokomizo | ThreeBond Racing |
| 6 | R1 | Suzuka Circuit, Suzuka | 2 July | (Japan) Daisuke Ikeda | (Japan) Kazuki Nakajima | (Brazil) João Paulo de Oliveira | TOM'S |
| 6 | R2 | Suzuka Circuit, Suzuka | 3 July | (Brazil) João Paulo de Oliveira | (Japan) Kazuki Nakajima | (Brazil) Roberto Streit | Inging |
| 7 | R1 | Mine Circuit, Mine | 30 July | (Brazil) João Paulo de Oliveira | (Japan) Kazuki Nakajima | (Japan) Kazuki Nakajima | TOM'S |
| 7 | R2 | Mine Circuit, Mine | 31 July | (Brazil) Roberto Streit | (Brazil) Roberto Streit | (Japan) Kazuki Nakajima | TOM'S |
| 8 | R1 | Fuji Speedway, Oyama | 27 August | (Japan) Kazuki Nakajima | (Japan) Kazuki Nakajima | (Italy) Paolo Montin | ThreeBond Racing |
| 8 | R2 | Fuji Speedway, Oyama | 28 August | (Japan) Kazuki Nakajima | (Japan) Kazuki Nakajima | (Brazil) João Paulo de Oliveira | TOM'S |
| 9 | R1 | Mine Circuit, Mine | 10 September | (Brazil) João Paulo de Oliveira | (Japan) Kazuki Nakajima | (New Zealand) Jonny Reid | Inging |
| 9 | R2 | Mine Circuit, Mine | 11 September | (New Zealand) Jonny Reid | (Brazil) João Paulo de Oliveira | (Brazil) João Paulo de Oliveira | TOM'S |
| 10 | R1 | Twin Ring Motegi, Motegi | 22 October | (Japan) Hideki Mutoh | (Japan) Hideki Mutoh | (Japan) Hideki Mutoh | M-TEC |
| 10 | R2 | Twin Ring Motegi, Motegi | 23 October | (Japan) Hideki Mutoh | (Brazil) Roberto Streit | (Italy) Paolo Montin | ThreeBond Racing |

== Standings ==
- Points are awarded as follows:

| 1 | 2 | 3 | 4 | 5 | 6 | 7 | 8 | 9 | 10 |
|---|---|---|---|---|---|---|---|---|---|
| 20 | 15 | 12 | 10 | 8 | 6 | 4 | 3 | 2 | 1 |

| Pos | Driver | MOT | | SUZ | | SUG | | FUJ | | OKA | | SUZ | | MIN | | FUJ | | MIN | | MOT | | Pts |
|---|---|---|---|---|---|---|---|---|---|---|---|---|---|---|---|---|---|---|---|---|---|---|
| 1 | (Brazil) João Paulo de Oliveira | **1** | **2** | 1 | **2** | Ret | 2 | 1 | 1 | **2** | **4** | 1 | **2** | **2** | 5 | 4 | 1 | **3** | 1 | 2 | 2 | 272 |
| 2 | (Japan) Kazuki Nakajima | Ret | Ret | 3 | 3 | 4 | 3 | 2 | **2** | 4 | 8 | 2 | 5 | 1 | 1 | **2** | **2** | Ret | 2 | 3 | Ret | 209 |
| 3 | (Japan) Hideki Mutoh | Ret | 1 | 4 | 1 | 3 | 8 | 5 | 5 | 7 | 7 | 4 | 3 | 5 | Ret | 8 | 6 | 2 | 4 | **1** | **3** | 179 |
| 4 | (Japan) Naoki Yokomizo | 3 | 4 | 8 | 8 | **1** | **1** | **3** | 4 | 6 | 1 | 8 | 6 | 6 | 2 | 3 | Ret | 4 | 3 | 10 | 12 | 177 |
| 5 | (Italy) Paolo Montin | 2 | 3 | 9 | 6 | 9 | Ret | Ret | 8 | 1 | 3 | 7 | 4 | 4 | 3 | 1 | 3 | NC | 6 | 4 | 1 | 174 |
| 6 | (Brazil) Roberto Streit | 4 | 6 | 5 | Ret | 5 | 5 | Ret | 7 | 5 | 6 | 5 | 1 | **3** | Ret | 5 | 5 | 6 | 5 | 9 | 4 | 138 |
| 7 | (Japan) Daisuke Ikeda | 5 | 5 | **2** | 4 | 7 | 4 | 8 | 3 | 3 | 2 | **3** | Ret | 9 | 10 | 6 | 11 | 11 | 7 | 11 | 7 | 126 |
| 8 | (New Zealand) Jonny Reid | 6 | 7 | 7 | 5 | 2 | 6 | 4 | 9 | 8 | 5 | Ret | DNS | 7 | Ret | 7 | Ret | 1 | **12** | | | 94 |
| 9 | (Japan) Taku Bamba | 7 | 9 | 6 | 9 | 8 | 7 | 7 | 10 | 12 | 10 | 6 | 7 | 11 | 7 | 9 | 4 | 8 | 9 | 5 | 13 | 65 |
| 10 | (Japan) Hideto Yasuoka | 10 | 12 | 11 | DNS | | | 6 | 11 | 11 | 13 | 10 | DNS | 8 | 4 | Ret | 8 | 5 | Ret | 8 | Ret | 35 |
| 11 | (Japan) Yasuhiro Takasaki | 8 | 8 | 10 | 7 | Ret | 10 | 9 | 6 | 9 | 9 | 13 | DNS | 13 | Ret | 15 | 10 | Ret | 10 | 7 | 11 | 30 |
| 12 | (Japan) Hiroki Katoh | | | | | 6 | 9 | | | | | | | | | | | | | 6 | 6 | 20 |
| 13 | (Japan) Koki Saga | 11 | 10 | 12 | 10 | Ret | 11 | 11 | 13 | 14 | 12 | 9 | 8 | 10 | 6 | 10 | 9 | Ret | 13 | 15 | 8 | 20 |
| 14 | (Japan) Koudai Tsukakoshi | | | | | | | | | | | | | | | 11 | 7 | 7 | 8 | 12 | 5 | 19 |
| 15 | (Japan) Ryo Orime | 9 | Ret | 13 | 11 | 10 | 13 | 10 | 12 | 10 | 11 | 11 | 9 | 12 | Ret | 12 | 13 | 12 | 11 | Ret | Ret | 7 |
| 16 | (Japan) Motohiko Isozaki | 12 | 11 | 14 | 12 | 11 | Ret | 12 | 14 | 13 | Ret | 12 | 10 | 14 | 11 | 14 | 12 | 10 | 15 | 13 | 9 | 4 |
| 17 | (Japan) Hironari Kawachi | | | | | | | | | | | | | Ret | Ret | 13 | 14 | 9 | 14 | 14 | 10 | 3 |
| Pos | Driver | MOT | | SUZ | | SUG | | FUJ | | OKA | | SUZ | | MIN | | FUJ | | MIN | | MOT | | Pts |

| Colour | Result |
|---|---|
| Gold | Winner |
| Silver | Second place |
| Bronze | Third place |
| Green | Points classification |
| Blue | Non-points classification |
| Blue | Non-classified finish (NC) |
| Purple | Retired, not classified (Ret) |
| Red | Did not qualify (DNQ) |
| Red | Did not pre-qualify (DNPQ) |
| Black | Disqualified (DSQ) |
| White | Did not start (DNS) |
| White | Withdrew (WD) |
| White | Race cancelled (C) |
| Blank | Did not practice (DNP) |
| Blank | Did not arrive (DNA) |
| Blank | Excluded (EX) |

**Bold** – Pole
Italics – Fastest Lap
