= 2008 Formula Nippon Championship =

The 2008 Formula Nippon Championship was the thirty-sixth season of premier Japanese single-seater racing, and the thirteenth under the Formula Nippon moniker. The series was contested over 11 races across eight weekends at five venues, with three double-header race meetings awarding half-points added to the calendar. 11 teams and 22 drivers competed over the course of the season.

Defending champion Tsugio Matsuda of Team Impul successfully defended his title and won his second series championship, becoming the first driver since Satoru Nakajima to win consecutive championships in Japanese top formula racing. Together with teammate Benoît Tréluyer, Team Impul also secured the teams championship with a round to go.

This was the final season for Lola as the series' chassis supplier, and the last race for Toyota and Honda's three-litre, naturally-aspirated V8 engines that were introduced in 2006. This was also the final season for four-time Formula Nippon Champion Satoshi Motoyama, who retired from the series after 2008.

== Teams and drivers ==
All teams used tyres supplied by Bridgestone and Lola B06/51 chassis.

Team	#	Driver	Engine	Rounds
Lawson Team Impul	1	(Japan) Tsugio Matsuda	Toyota RV8J	All
Lawson Team Impul	2	(France) Benoît Tréluyer	Toyota RV8J	All
Kondo Racing	3	(Japan) Naoki Yokomizo	Toyota RV8J	All
Kondo Racing	4	(Brazil) João Paulo de Oliveira	Toyota RV8J	All
SG Team 5Zigen	5	(Japan) Toshihiro Kaneishi	Honda HF386E	All
SG Team 5Zigen	6	(Japan) Katsuyuki Hiranaka	Honda HF386E	1–4, 7–8
SG Team 5Zigen	6	(Japan) Hiroki Yoshimoto	Honda HF386E	5–6
Team LeMans	7	(Japan) Satoshi Motoyama	Toyota RV8J	All
Team LeMans	8	(Japan) Hiroaki Ishiura	Toyota RV8J	All
TP Checker Team Impul	20	(Japan) Kohei Hirate	Toyota RV8J	1–6, 8
TP Checker Team Impul	20	(United Kingdom) Richard Lyons	Toyota RV8J	7
PIAA Nakajima Racing	31	(France) Loïc Duval	Honda HF386E	All
PIAA Nakajima Racing	32	(Japan) Takashi Kogure	Honda HF386E	All
Petronas Team TOM'S	36	(Germany) André Lotterer	Toyota RV8J	All
Petronas Team TOM'S	37	(Japan) Seiji Ara	Toyota RV8J	All
DoCoMo Team Dandelion Racing	40	(Japan) Kosuke Matsuura	Honda HF386E	All
DoCoMo Team Dandelion Racing	41	(Japan) Takeshi Tsuchiya	Honda HF386E	All
Cerumo/Inging	47	(Italy) Ronnie Quintarelli	Toyota RV8J	All
Cerumo/Inging	48	(Japan) Yuji Tachikawa	Toyota RV8J	All
Autobacs Racing Team Aguri	55	(Japan) Yuji Ide	Honda HF386E	All
Autobacs Racing Team Aguri	56	(Japan) Takuya Izawa	Honda HF386E	All
Stonemarket Blaak Cerumo/Inging	67	(Brazil) Roberto Streit	Toyota RV8J	All

== Calendar ==
2008 venues
- All races held in Japan.

Round	Circuit	Date	Pole position	Fastest lap	Winning driver	Winning team
1	Fuji Speedway	6 April	(Japan) Tsugio Matsuda	(Japan) Yuji Tachikawa	(Japan) Tsugio Matsuda	Team Impul
2	Suzuka Circuit	11 May	(Japan) Tsugio Matsuda	(Japan) Yuji Tachikawa	(Japan) Tsugio Matsuda	Team Impul
3	Twin Ring Motegi	25 May	(Japan) Tsugio Matsuda	(Japan) Tsugio Matsuda	(Japan) Tsugio Matsuda	Team Impul
4	Okayama International Circuit	8 June	(Japan) Tsugio Matsuda	(Japan) Satoshi Motoyama	(France) Loïc Duval	Nakajima Racing
5	Suzuka Circuit	13 July	(Japan) Tsugio Matsuda	(Japan) Hiroaki Ishiura	(Japan) Tsugio Matsuda	Team Impul
5	Suzuka Circuit	13 July	(Japan) Satoshi Motoyama^{1}	(Brazil) Roberto Streit	(Japan) Kohei Hirate	Team Impul
6	Twin Ring Motegi	10 August	(Japan) Tsugio Matsuda	(Brazil) Roberto Streit	(France) Loïc Duval	Nakajima Racing
6	Twin Ring Motegi	10 August	(Japan) Takeshi Tsuchiya^{1}	(Japan) Takeshi Tsuchiya	(Japan) Seiji Ara	TOM'S Racing
7	Fuji Speedway	31 August	(Brazil) João Paulo de Oliveira	(Japan) Takashi Kogure	(Brazil) João Paulo de Oliveira	Kondō Racing
7	Fuji Speedway	31 August	(Japan) Kosuke Matsuura^{1}	(Japan) Toshihiro Kaneishi	(Japan) Kosuke Matsuura	Dandelion Racing
8	Sportsland SUGO	21 September	(Japan) Satoshi Motoyama	(France) Loïc Duval	(Japan) Tsugio Matsuda	Team Impul

== Championship standings ==
=== Drivers' Championship ===
Scoring system

	Position	1	2	3	4	5	6	7	8	9	10	PP
Rds 1–4, 8	Points	15	12	10	8	6	5	4	3	2	1	1
Rds 5–7 R1	Points	10	8	6	5	4	3	2	1	0		1
Rds 5–7 R2	Points	5	4	3	2	1	0					

* – In race 2 at the August Fuji meeting, the race was run behind the safety car for five laps before the race was halted. Half points were awarded.

Pos	Driver	FUJ	SUZ	MOT	OKA	SUZ		MOT		FUJ		SUG	Pts
1	(Japan) Tsugio Matsuda	**1**	**1**	**1**	**Ret**	**1**	8	**2**	2	4	5	1	93.5
2	(France) Loïc Duval	10	10	3	1	6	2	1	Ret	2	7	3	62
3	(Germany) André Lotterer	Ret	3	2	2	2	4	11	7	5	4	12	49
4	(Japan) Kohei Hirate	Ret	2	6	3	5	1	Ret	DNS			5	42
5	(Japan) Takashi Kogure	6	5	Ret	9	3	7	5	Ret	3	6	2	41
6	(Brazil) João Paulo de Oliveira	Ret	Ret	9	11	4	5	3	3	**1**	8	6	33
7	(Japan) Yuji Tachikawa	2	17	7	4	17	12	4	4	9	9	15	31
8	(France) Benoît Tréluyer	4	7	Ret	8	Ret	13	15	Ret	7	2	4	27
9	(Italy) Ronnie Quintarelli	5	8	Ret	7	10	9	Ret	13	6	3	7	21.5
10	(Japan) Takuya Izawa	Ret	9	4	5	12	Ret	Ret	12	18	17	8	19
11	(Japan) Satoshi Motoyama	Ret	4	16	Ret	8	**3**	9	5	14	14	**Ret**	14
12	(Japan) Naoki Yokomizo	NC	6	11	6	7	6	Ret	11	12	12	Ret	12
13	(Brazil) Roberto Streit	3	15	Ret	Ret	11	10	Ret	9	19	18	10	11
14	(Japan) Seiji Ara	Ret	11	10	10	13	11	7	1	10	10	16	9
15	(Japan) Toshihiro Kaneishi	11	Ret	5	14	Ret	14	6	Ret	16	20	11	9
16	(Japan) Hiroaki Ishiura	7	13	8	Ret	14	Ret	13	8	17	16	9	9
17	(Japan) Takeshi Tsuchiya	8	14	14	12	16	Ret	8	**14**	11	11	14	4
18	(Japan) Kosuke Matsuura	12	16	12	13	9	Ret	10	6	8	**1**	13	3.5
19	(Japan) Yuji Ide	9	18	15	NC	15	Ret	12	Ret	NC	19	17	2
20	(Japan) Hiroki Yoshimoto					18	15	14	10				0
21	(Japan) Katsuyuki Hiranaka	Ret	12	13	15					15	15	Ret	0
22	(United Kingdom) Richard Lyons									13	13		0
Pos	Driver	FUJ	SUZ	MOT	OKA	SUZ		MOT		FUJ		SUG	Pts

Colour	Result
Gold	Winner
Silver	Second place
Bronze	Third place
Green	Points classification
Blue	Non-points classification
Blue	Non-classified finish (NC)
Purple	Retired, not classified (Ret)
Red	Did not qualify (DNQ)
Red	Did not pre-qualify (DNPQ)
Black	Disqualified (DSQ)
White	Did not start (DNS)
White	Withdrew (WD)
White	Race cancelled (C)
Blank	Did not practice (DNP)
Blank	Did not arrive (DNA)
Blank	Excluded (EX)

**Bold** - Pole
Italics - Fastest Lap

=== Teams' Championship ===
Scoring system

	Position	1	2	3	4	5	6	7	8	9	10
Rds 1–4, 8	Points	15	12	10	8	6	5	4	3	2	1
Rds 5–7 R1	Points	10	8	6	5	4	3	2	1	0	
Rds 5–7 R2	Points	5	4	3	2	1	0				

Pos	Team	Car	FUJ	SUZ	MOT	OKA	SUZ		MOT		FUJ		SUG	Pts
1	Lawson Team Impul	1	**1**	**1**	**1**	**Ret**	**1**	8	**2**	2	4	5	1	114.5
1	Lawson Team Impul	2	4	7	Ret	8	Ret	13	15	Ret	7	2	4	114.5
2	PIAA Nakajima Racing	31	10	10	3	1	6	2	1	Ret	2	7	3	103
2	PIAA Nakajima Racing	32	6	5	Ret	9	3	7	5	Ret	3	6	2	103
3	Petronas Team TOM'S	36	Ret	3	2	2	2	4	11	7	5	4	12	58
3	Petronas Team TOM'S	37	Ret	11	10	10	13	11	7	1	10	10	16	58
4	Cerumo/Inging	47	5	8	Ret	7	10	9	Ret	13	6	3	7	52.5
4	Cerumo/Inging	48	2	17	7	4	17	12	4	4	9	9	15	52.5
5	Kondo Racing	3	NC	6	11	6	7	6	Ret	11	12	12	Ret	44
5	Kondo Racing	4	Ret	Ret	9	11	4	5	3	3	**1**	8	6	44
6	TP Checker Impul	20	Ret	2	6	3	5	1	Ret	DNS	13	13	5	42
7	Team LeMans	7	Ret	4	16	Ret	8	**3**	9	5	14	14	**Ret**	22
7	Team LeMans	8	7	13	8	Ret	14	Ret	13	8	17	16	9	22
8	Autobacs Racing Team Aguri	55	9	18	15	NC	15	Ret	12	Ret	NC	19	17	21
8	Autobacs Racing Team Aguri	56	Ret	9	4	5	12	Ret	Ret	12	18	17	8	21
9	Stonemarket Cerumo/Inging	67	3	15	Ret	Ret	11	10	Ret	9	19	18	10	11
10	SG Team 5Zigen	5	11	Ret	5	14	Ret	14	6	Ret	16	20	11	9
10	SG Team 5Zigen	6	Ret	12	13	15	18	15	14	10	15	15	Ret	9
11	DoCoMo Team Dandelion Racing	40	12	16	12	13	9	Ret	10	6	8	**1**	13	7.5
11	DoCoMo Team Dandelion Racing	41	8	14	14	12	16	Ret	8	**14**	11	11	14	7.5

== Notes ==
1. For the doubleheader race weekends, the driver that finished 8th in Race 1 was awarded pole for Race 2 in a reverse grid from 8th to 1st. These are not officially counted as pole positions by the JRP.
