= 2010 Formula Nippon Championship =

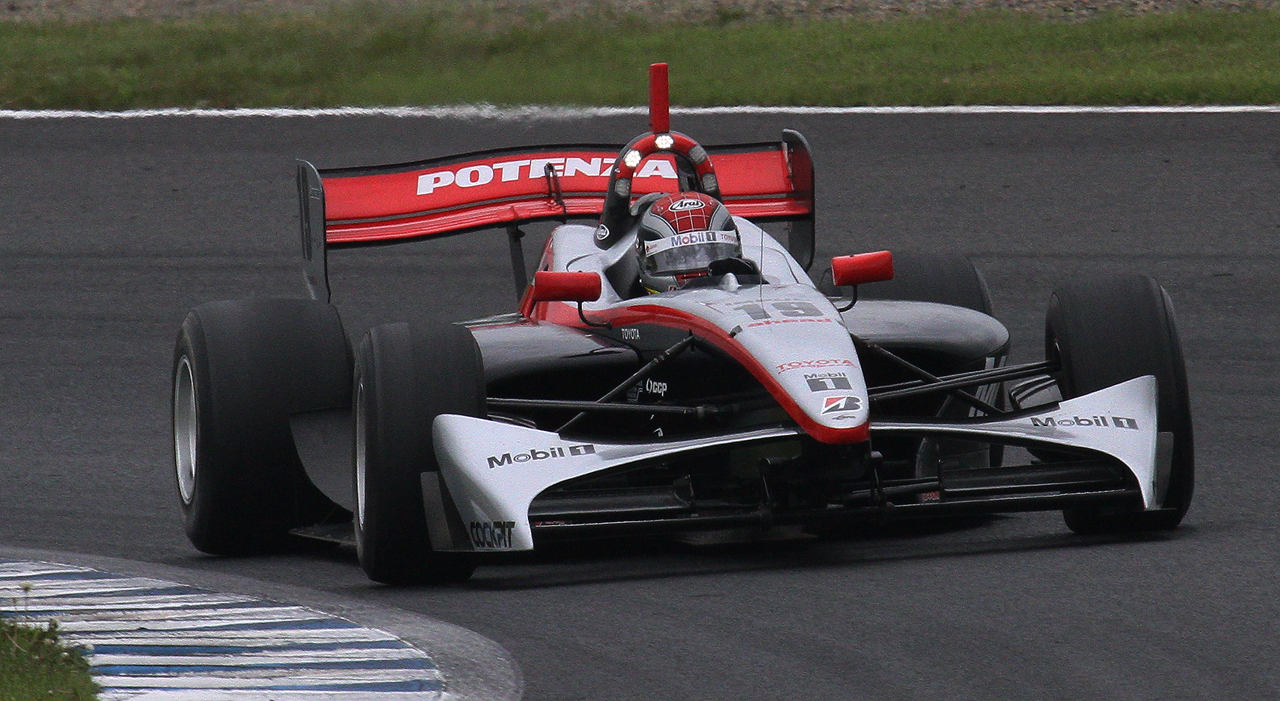
2010 champion, João Paulo de Oliveira

The 2010 Formula Nippon Championship was the thirty-eighth season of the premier Japanese open-wheel motor racing series. The series for Formula Nippon racing cars was contested over eight races at seven rounds, beginning on 18 April at Suzuka and ending at the same venue on 7 November. A non-championship meeting at Fuji Speedway completed the season's racing a week later.

Having missed the 2009 season to focus on his Super GT commitments, João Paulo de Oliveira returned to the series and claimed his first championship title since winning the 2005 All-Japan Formula Three Championship. Team Impul's de Oliveira had held the championship lead by a point over TOM'S driver André Lotterer before the final double-header round at Suzuka, but de Oliveira's victory – his second victory after a win at Twin Ring Motegi – and fourth against Lotterer's second and a third, de Oliveira won the championship by 4.5 points. As well as his win at Autopolis, Lotterer won both non-championship races at Fuji.

Third place was disputed by reigning champion Loïc Duval, who had moved from Nakajima Racing to Docomo Team Dandelion Racing over the off-season, and his former Nakajima team-mate Takashi Kogure, which was resolved in favour of Duval by 1.5 points; both drivers' championship chances had been stunted by no points at Autopolis, as Duval failed to start and Kogure retired from the race. Duval did tie with de Oliveira for most victories during the season with two – Motegi and Suzuka – while Kogure won the season-opening race at Suzuka. De Oliveira's team-mate Kohei Hirate finished the season fifth with a victory at Fuji, ahead of the season's other race-winner Kazuya Oshima of the TOM's team.

== Teams and drivers ==
Team	#	Driver	Engine	Rounds
(Japan) Docomo Team Dandelion Racing	1	(France) Loïc Duval	Honda HR10E	All *
(Japan) Docomo Team Dandelion Racing	2	(Japan) Takuya Izawa	Honda HR10E	All *
(Japan) Kondo Racing	3	(Japan) Tsugio Matsuda	Toyota RV8K	4–7 *
(Japan) Team LeMans	7	(Italy) Kei Cozzolino	Toyota RV8K	All *
(Japan) Team LeMans	8	(Japan) Hiroaki Ishiura	Toyota RV8K	All *
(Japan) HFPD Racing	10	(Japan) Koudai Tsukakoshi	Honda HR10E	All *
(Japan) Motul Team Mugen	16	(Japan) Yuji Ide	Honda HR10E	All *
(Hong Kong) KCMG	18	(Japan) Katsuyuki Hiranaka	Toyota RV8K	All *
(Japan) Mobil 1 Team Impul	19	(Brazil) João Paulo de Oliveira	Toyota RV8K	All *
(Japan) Mobil 1 Team Impul	20	(Japan) Kohei Hirate	Toyota RV8K	All *
(Japan) Deliziefollie/Cerumo-Inging	29	(Japan) Takuto Iguchi	Toyota RV8K	All *
(Japan) Nakajima Racing	31	(Japan) Naoki Yamamoto	Honda HR10E	All *
(Japan) Nakajima Racing	32	(Japan) Takashi Kogure	Honda HR10E	All *
(Japan) Petronas Team TOM'S	36	(Germany) André Lotterer	Toyota RV8K	All *
(Japan) Petronas Team TOM'S	37	(Japan) Kazuya Oshima	Toyota RV8K	All *

* Drivers who participated in the non-championship round at Fuji Speedway.

== Race calendar and results ==
2010 venues
- All races were held in Japan. A non-championship round, entitled Super GT and Formula Nippon Sprint Cup 2010, was held at the conclusion of the season.

Round	Circuit	Date	Pole position	Fastest lap	Winning driver	Winning team
1	Suzuka Circuit	18 April	(Japan) Takashi Kogure	(Japan) Kohei Hirate	(Japan) Takashi Kogure	Nakajima Racing
2	Twin Ring Motegi	23 May	(Brazil) João Paulo de Oliveira	(Brazil) João Paulo de Oliveira	(Brazil) João Paulo de Oliveira	Team Impul
3	Fuji Speedway	18 July	(France) Loïc Duval	(Japan) Kohei Hirate	(Japan) Kohei Hirate	Team Impul
4	Twin Ring Motegi	8 August	(Japan) Takashi Kogure	(Brazil) João Paulo de Oliveira	(France) Loïc Duval	Dandelion Racing
5	Sportsland SUGO	26 September	(France) Loïc Duval	(Germany) André Lotterer	(Japan) Kazuya Oshima	Petronas Team TOM'S
6	Autopolis	17 October	(Japan) Kazuya Oshima	(Italy) Kei Cozzolino	(Germany) André Lotterer	Petronas Team TOM'S
7	Suzuka Circuit	7 November	(France) Loïc Duval	(France) Loïc Duval	(France) Loïc Duval	Dandelion Racing
7	Suzuka Circuit	7 November	(Brazil) João Paulo de Oliveira	(Japan) Takashi Kogure	(Brazil) João Paulo de Oliveira	Team Impul
NC	Fuji Speedway (Fuji Sprint Cup)	13 November	(Italy) Kei Cozzolino	(Germany) André Lotterer	(Germany) André Lotterer	Petronas Team TOM'S
NC	Fuji Speedway (Fuji Sprint Cup)	14 November	(Germany) André Lotterer	(Germany) André Lotterer	(Germany) André Lotterer	Petronas Team TOM'S

== Championship standings ==
=== Drivers' Championship ===
Scoring system

Round	Position	1st	2nd	3rd	4th	5th	6th	7th	8th	Pole
1–6	Points	10	8	6	5	4	3	2	1	1
7†	Points	8	4	3	2.5	2	1.5	1	0.5	1

† Round with two races and points scoring system for each race.
‡ Non-championship round, with no points awarded.

Pos	Driver	SUZ	MOT	FUJ	MOT	SUG	AUT	SUZ †		FUJ ‡		Points
1	(Brazil) João Paulo de Oliveira	2	**1**	3	6	11	2	4	**1**	10	DSQ	47.5
2	(Germany) André Lotterer	3	3	2	Ret	3	1	3	2	1	**1**	43
3	(France) Loïc Duval	6	4	**14**	1	**2**	DNS	**1**	4	Ret	5	39.5
4	(Japan) Takashi Kogure	**1**	6	5	**2**	5	Ret	2	3	6	DSQ	38
5	(Japan) Kohei Hirate	4	7	1	3	12	8	9	6	5	6	25.5
6	(Japan) Kazuya Oshima	12	8	4	5	1	**DNS**	5	7	2	8	24
7	(Japan) Naoki Yamamoto	7	5	7	4	Ret	5	6	5	8	2	20.5
8	(Japan) Hiroaki Ishiura	10	Ret	6	8	4	3	7	10	13	12	16
9	(Japan) Koudai Tsukakoshi	8	2	11	10	Ret	DSQ	10	12	3	7	9
10	(Italy) Kei Cozzolino	Ret	10	8	13	7	4	13	14	**9**	Ret	8
11	(Japan) Takuya Izawa	5	11	9	11	6	DNS	11	11	7	4	7
12	(Japan) Katsuyuki Hiranaka	Ret	DNS	13	7	Ret	7	12	13	12	11	4
13	(Japan) Takuto Iguchi	11	Ret	12	12	10	6	15	Ret	14	9	3
14	(Japan) Yuji Ide	9	9	10	9	9	DNS	8	8	4	3	1
15	(Japan) Tsugio Matsuda				Ret	8	Ret	14	9	11	10	1
Pos	Driver	SUZ	MOT	FUJ	MOT	SUG	AUT	SUZ †		FUJ ‡		Points

Colour	Result
Gold	Winner
Silver	Second place
Bronze	Third place
Green	Points classification
Blue	Non-points classification
Blue	Non-classified finish (NC)
Purple	Retired, not classified (Ret)
Red	Did not qualify (DNQ)
Red	Did not pre-qualify (DNPQ)
Black	Disqualified (DSQ)
White	Did not start (DNS)
White	Withdrew (WD)
White	Race cancelled (C)
Blank	Did not practice (DNP)
Blank	Did not arrive (DNA)
Blank	Excluded (EX)

**Bold** – Pole
Italics – Fastest Lap

=== Teams' Championship ===
Scoring system

Round	Position	1st	2nd	3rd	4th	5th	6th	7th	8th
1–6	Points	10	8	6	5	4	3	2	1
7	Points	8	4	3	2.5	2	1.5	1	0.5

Pos	Team	Car	SUZ	MOT	FUJ	MOT	SUG	AUT	SUZ		Pts
1	Mobil 1 Team Impul	19	2	**1**	3	6	11	2	4	**1**	68
1	Mobil 1 Team Impul	20	4	7	1	3	12	8	9	6	68
2	Petronas Team TOM'S	36	3	3	2	Ret	3	1	3	2	67
2	Petronas Team TOM'S	37	12	8	4	5	1	**DNS**	5	7	67
3	Nakajima Racing	31	7	5	7	4	Ret	5	6	5	56.5
3	Nakajima Racing	32	**1**	6	5	**2**	5	Ret	2	3	56.5
4	Docomo Team Dandelion Racing	1	6	4	**14**	1	**2**	DNS	**1**	4	40.5
4	Docomo Team Dandelion Racing	2	5	11	9	11	6	DNS	11	11	40.5
5	Team LeMans	7	Ret	10	8	13	7	4	13	14	24
5	Team LeMans	8	10	Ret	6	8	4	3	7	10	24
6	HFDP Racing	10	8	2	11	10	Ret	DSQ	10	12	9
7	KCMG	18	Ret	DNS	13	7	Ret	7	12	13	4
8	Deliziefollie/Cerumo-Inging	29	11	Ret	12	12	10	6	15	Ret	3
9	Kondo Racing	3				Ret	8	Ret	14	9	1
10	Motul Team Mugen	16	9	9	10	9	9	DNS	8	8	1
