= Seiji Ara =

Japanese racing driver

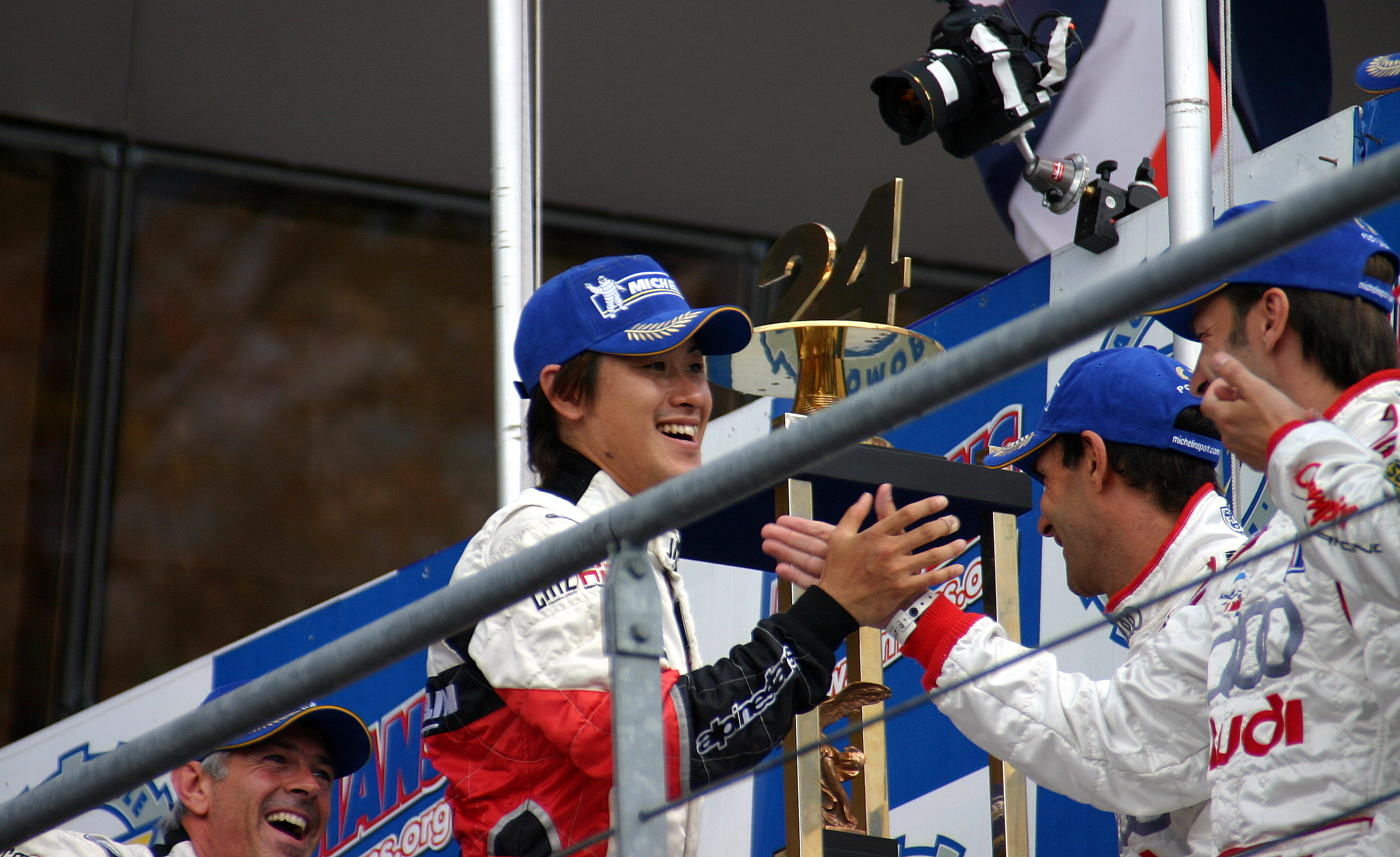
- Ara at the 2004 24 Hours of Le Mans
- Nationality: (Japan) Japanese
- Born: May 5, 1974 (age 52) Chiba, Japan

FIA GT1 World Championship career
- Debut season: 2010
- Current team: Swiss Racing Team
- Categorisation: FIA Platinum (until 2012); FIA Gold (2013–)
- Car number: 4
- Starts: 20
- Wins: 0
- Poles: 0
- Fastest laps: 0
- Best finish: 42nd in 2010

Previous series
- 2009 2004 2001–02, 06–08 2000–09 1998-00 1996: WTCC; Le Mans Series; Formula Nippon; Super GT; Japanese F3; Barber Pro Series

24 Hours of Le Mans career
- Years: 2001–2005, 2009, 2012
- Teams: Viper Team Oreca, Audi Sport Japan Team Goh, Jim Gainer International, NAVI Team Goh
- Best finish: 1st (2004)
- Class wins: 1

Seiji Ara (荒 聖治; Ara Seiji) (born May 5, 1974 in Chiba, Japan) is a Japanese race car driver.

Ara was the winner of the 24-hour Le Mans race in 2004, driving an Audi R8. In the same year, he also raced in the Le Mans Endurance Series and Japanese GT Championship.

In earlier years, Ara had competed in Formula Nippon (2001–2002), Japanese Formula 3 (1997–2000) and the Barber Dodge Pro Series (1995).

Ara made his World Touring Car Championship debut with Wiechers-Sport at the 2009 FIA WTCC Race of Japan.

== Racing record ==
=== 24 Hours of Le Mans results ===
Year	Team	Co-Drivers	Car	Class	Laps	Pos.	Class Pos.
2001	(France) Viper Team Oreca	(Japan) Masahiko Kondo (Portugal) Ni Amorim	Chrysler LMP	LMP900	243	DNF	DNF
2002	Audi Sport Japan Team Goh	(Japan) Hiroki Katoh (France) Yannick Dalmas	Audi R8	LMP900	358	7th	6th
2003	Audi Sport Japan Team Goh	(Denmark) Jan Magnussen (Germany) Marco Werner	Audi R8	LMP900	370	4th	**2nd**
2004	Audi Sport Japan Team Goh	(Italy) Rinaldo Capello (Denmark) Tom Kristensen	Audi R8	LMP900	379	**1st**	**1st**
2005	(Japan) Jim Gainer International	(Japan) Ryo Michigami (Japan) Katsutomo Kaneishi	Dome S101Hb-Mugen	LMP1	193	DNF	DNF
2009	(Japan) Navi Team Goh	(Japan) Keisuke Kunimoto (Germany) Sascha Maassen	Porsche RS Spyder Evo	LMP2	339	DNF	DNF
2012	(France) Pescarolo Team	(France) Nicolas Minassian (France) Sébastien Bourdais	Dome S102.5-Judd	LMP1	203	NC	NC

=== Complete GT1 World Championship results ===
Year	Team	Car	1	2	3	4	5	6	7	8	9	10	11	12	13	14	15	16	17	18	19	20	Pos	Points
2010	Swiss Racing Team	Nissan	ABU; QR; 12	ABU; CR; Ret	SIL; QR; 14	SIL; CR; 9	BRN; QR; 15	BRN; CR; 14	PRI; QR; 12	PRI; CR; Ret	SPA; QR; 17	SPA; CR; 16	NÜR; QR; 17	NÜR; CR; 21	ALG; QR; 11	ALG; CR; 18	NAV; QR; 13	NAV; CR; Ret	INT; QR; 13	INT; CR; 16	SAN; QR; Ret	SAN; CR; 13	42nd	2

=== Complete JGTC/Super GT results ===
(key) (Races in bold indicate pole position) (Races in italics indicate fastest lap)

Year	Team	Car	Class	1	2	3	4	5	6	7	8	9	DC	Pts
2000	TOM'S	Toyota Supra	GT500	MOT; 9	FUJ; Ret	SUG; 8	FUJ; 14	TAI; 12	MIN; 9	SUZ; 12			21st	7
2001	Tsuchiya Engineering	Toyota Supra	GT500	TAI; 9	FUJ; 11	SUG; 11	FUJ; DNQ	MOT; 7	SUZ; 7	MIN; 10			19th	11
2002	Tsuchiya Engineering	Toyota Supra	GT500	TAI; 6	FUJ	SUG; 11	SEP; Ret	FUJ; 3	MOT; 9	MIN; 5	SUZ; 7		16th	32
2003	Tsuchiya Racing	Toyota Supra	GT500	TAI; 10	FUJ	SUG; 4	FUJ; 14	FUJ; 17	MOT; 3	AUT; 12	**SUZ**; Ret		13th	26
2004	Team Cerumo	Toyota Supra	GT500	TAI; 5	SUG; 1	SEP; 7	TOK; 14	MOT; 10	**AUT**; 11	SUZ; 4			5th	45
2005	Kraft	Toyota Supra	GT500	OKA; Ret	FUJ; 7	SEP; 12	SUG; 14	MOT; 11	FUJ; 16	AUT; 12	SUZ; 16		19th	4
2006	Kondo Racing	Nissan Z	GT500	SUZ	OKA	FUJ	SEP	SUG; 10	SUZ; 5	MOT; 6	AUT; 14	FUJ; 3	16th	28
2007	Kondo Racing	Nissan Z	GT500	SUZ; Ret	OKA; 15	FUJ; Ret	SEP; 1	SUG; 10	SUZ; 10	MOT; 5	AUT; Ret	FUJ; 5	10th	34
2008	Kondo Racing	Nissan GT-R	GT500	SUZ; 5	OKA; 8	FUJ; 11	SEP; 1	SUG; 8	SUZ; 7	MOT; 14	AUT; 16	FUJ; 15	14th	34
2009	Kondo Racing	Nissan GT-R	GT500	OKA; 1	SUZ; 8	FUJ; 4	SEP; 5	SUG; 13	SUZ; 11	FUJ; 13	AUT; 3	MOT; 11	8th	48
2011	Lexus Team WedsSport BANDOH	Lexus SC430	GT500	OKA; 15	FUJ; 3	SEP; 11	SUG; 8	SUZ; 11	FUJ; 13	AUT; 7	MOT; 11		13th	18
2012	Lexus Team WedsSport BANDOH	Lexus SC430	GT500	OKA; 12	FUJ; 13	SEP; 9	SUG; Ret	SUZ; 6	FUJ; 3	**AUT**; 3	MOT; 5		9th	36
2013	Lexus Team WedsSport BANDOH	Lexus SC430	GT500	OKA; 14	FUJ; 11	SEP; 15	SUG; 9	SUZ; 6	FUJ; Ret	AUT; 13	MOT; 10		14th	9
2014	BMW Sports Trophy Team Studie	BMW Z4 GT3	GT300	OKA; 2	FUJ; 4	AUT; 15	SUG; 8	SUZ; 7	FUJ; 3	BUR; 2	MOT; 7		**3rd**	**62**
2015	BMW Sports Trophy Team Studie	BMW Z4 GT3	GT300	OKA; Ret	FUJ; 6	CHA; 3	FUJ; Ret	SUZ; 2	SUG; 19	AUT; 3	MOT; 9		7th	47
2016	BMW Team Studie	BMW M6 GT3	GT300	OKA; 3	FUJ; 24	SUG; 10	FUJ; 20	SUZ; DNS	CHA; 6	MOT; 15	MOT; 12		15th	17
2017	BMW Team Studie	BMW M6 GT3	GT300	OKA; 13	FUJ; 7	AUT; 4	SUG; 16	SUZ; 6	FUJ; 11	BUR; 10	MOT; 13		15th	18
2019	McLaren Customer Racing Japan	McLaren 720S GT3	GT300	OKA; 19	FUJ; 14	SUZ; 13	CHA	FUJ; Ret	AUT; 2	SUG; 12	**MOT**; 7		15th	20
2020	BMW Team Studie × CSL	BMW M6 GT3	GT300	OKA; 15	FUJ; 22	SUZ; 21	CHA; Ret	SEP; 9	SUG; 8	AUT; 18	MOT; 19		26th	5
2021	BMW Team Studie × CSL	BMW M6 GT3	GT300	OKA 17	FUJ; 20	SUZ; 25	MOT; 25	SUG; 11	AUT; 13	MOT; 15	FUJ; Ret		NC	0
2022	BMW Team Studie × CSL	BMW M4 GT3	GT300	OKA; 24	FSW; Ret	**SUZ**; 1	FSW; 21	SUZ; 12	SUG; 5	AUT; 12	TRM; 9		11th	29
2023	BMW M Team Studie x CRS	BMW M4 GT3	GT300	OKA; 6	FUJ; 13	SUZ; 1	FUJ; 2	SUZ; 16	SUG; 13	AUT; 8	MOT; 12		6th	43
2024	BMW M Team Studie x CRS	BMW M4 GT3	GT300	OKA; 3	FUJ; 11	SUZ; 7	FUJ; 7	SUG; 4	AUT; 4	MOT; 5^{2}	SUZ; 13		5th	43

* Season still in progress.

=== Complete Formula Nippon results ===
(key) (Races in bold indicate pole position) (Races in italics indicate fastest lap)

Year	Entrant	1	2	3	4	5	6	7	8	9	10	11	DC	Points
2001	Cosmo Oil Racing Team Cerumo	SUZ; 3	MOT; Ret	MIN; Ret	FUJ; Ret	SUZ; 9	SUG; 10	FUJ; 8	MIN; Ret	MOT; 12	SUZ; Ret		12th	4
2002	Olympic Kondo Racing Team	SUZ; 8	FUJ; 4	MIN; 9	SUZ; 10	MOT; Ret	SUG; Ret	FUJ; Ret	MIN; 9	MOT; 11	SUZ; 10		11th	3
2006	Kondo Racing Team	FUJ	SUZ	MOT	SUZ; 10	AUT; 10	FUJ; 18	SUG; 13	MOT; Ret	SUZ; Ret			NC	0
2007	TOM'S	FUJ; 11	SUZ; Ret	MOT; 15	OKA; 7	SUZ; 10	FUJ; 4	SUG; Ret	MOT; 13	SUZ; 5			11th	11
2008	TOM'S	FUJ; Ret	SUZ; 11	MOT; 10	OKA; 10	SUZ1; 13	SUZ2; 11	MOT1; 7	MOT2; 1	FUJ1; 10	FUJ2; 10	SUG; 16	15th	9

=== Complete Japanese Formula 3 results ===
(key) (Races in bold indicate pole position) (Races in italics indicate fastest lap)

Year	Team	engine	1	2	3	4	5	6	7	8	9	10	DC	Pts
1998	Team G.R.P	Toyota	SUZ	TSU	MIN	FUJ	MOT	SUZ	SUG; 7	TAI; 9	SEN; 10	SUG; Ret	NC	0
1999	TOM'S	Toyota	**SUZ**; 1	TSU; Ret	FUJ; 3	MIN; Ret	FUJ; 3	SUZ; 8	SUG; Ret	TAI; 10	MOT; 4	SUZ	6th	20
2000	Toda Racing	Mugen	SUZ; Ret	TSU; 2	FUJ; 4	MIN; 5	TAI; 2	SUZ; 4	SUG; 3	**MOT**; 9	SEN; 3	SUZ; 3	3rd	30

Sporting positions
Preceded by Tom Kristensen; Rinaldo Capello; Guy Smith	Winner of the 24 Hours of Le Mans; 2004 with: Tom Kristensen; Rinaldo Capello	Succeeded by J.J. Lehto; Marco Werner; Tom Kristensen
