= João Paulo de Oliveira =

Brazilian professional racing driver (born 1981)

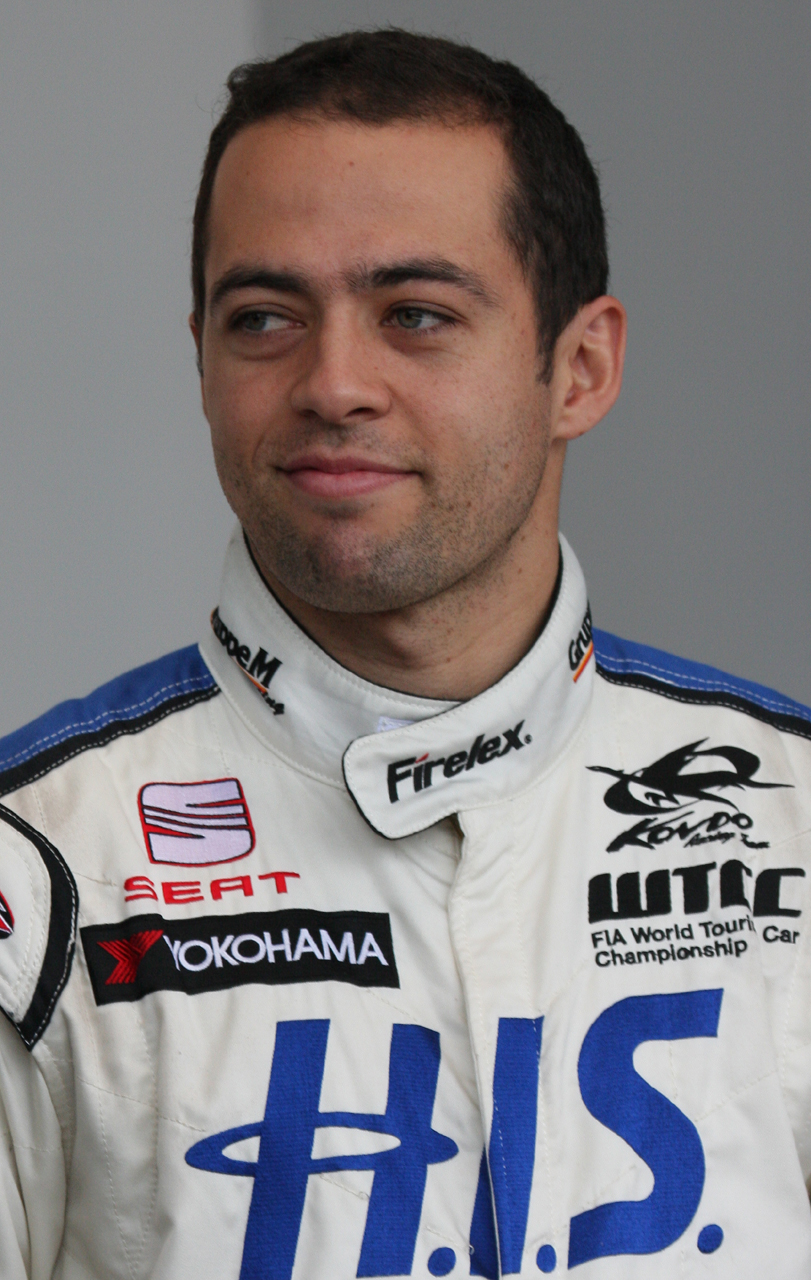
- de Oliveira at the 2009 FIA WTCC Race of Japan.
- Nationality: (Brazil) Brazilian
- Born: 13 July 1981 (age 45) São Paulo, Brazil

Super GT career
- Debut season: 2006
- Current team: Kondo Racing
- Categorisation: FIA Platinum
- Car number: 56
- Former teams: Hasemi Motorsport; Team Impul; D'station Racing AMR
- Starts: 169
- Wins: 15
- Poles: 7
- Fastest laps: 3
- Best finish: 1st in 2020, 2022, 2026

Previous series
- 2011 2009 2006–08, 2010–12 2004–05 2003 2003 2001–03 1999–2001: IndyCar Series; WTCC; Formula Nippon; All-Japan Formula Three; Austria Formula 3 Cup; British Formula 3 German Formula Three; Formula Three Sudamericana

Championship titles
- 2020, 22, 26 2010 2005 2003 1999: Super GT - GT300; Formula Nippon; All-Japan Formula Three; German Formula Three; F3 Sudamericana Class B

João Paulo "J.P." Lima de Oliveira (born 13 July 1981) is a Brazilian professional racing driver currently competing in the Japanese Super GT series and in the FIA World Endurance Championship driving for the Vanwall Racing Team. He won the Super GT GT300 class championship in both 2020 and 2022 and the Formula Nippon championship in 2010, and the ATS Formel 3 Cup in 2003.

De Oliveira is regarded as one of the most successful racing drivers to race in Japan in the last decade. JP, as he is known, has won in every category he competed in. After becoming the German F3 champion in 2003 by far, winning thirteen out of sixteen races, he arrived in Japan in 2004 and took the Japanese F3 title in next year with seven wins. After that, he joined Nissan as their official factory driver for the next thirteen years in Super GT and Super Formula. He is known for his speed and his in-depth ability for car development.

== Racing career ==
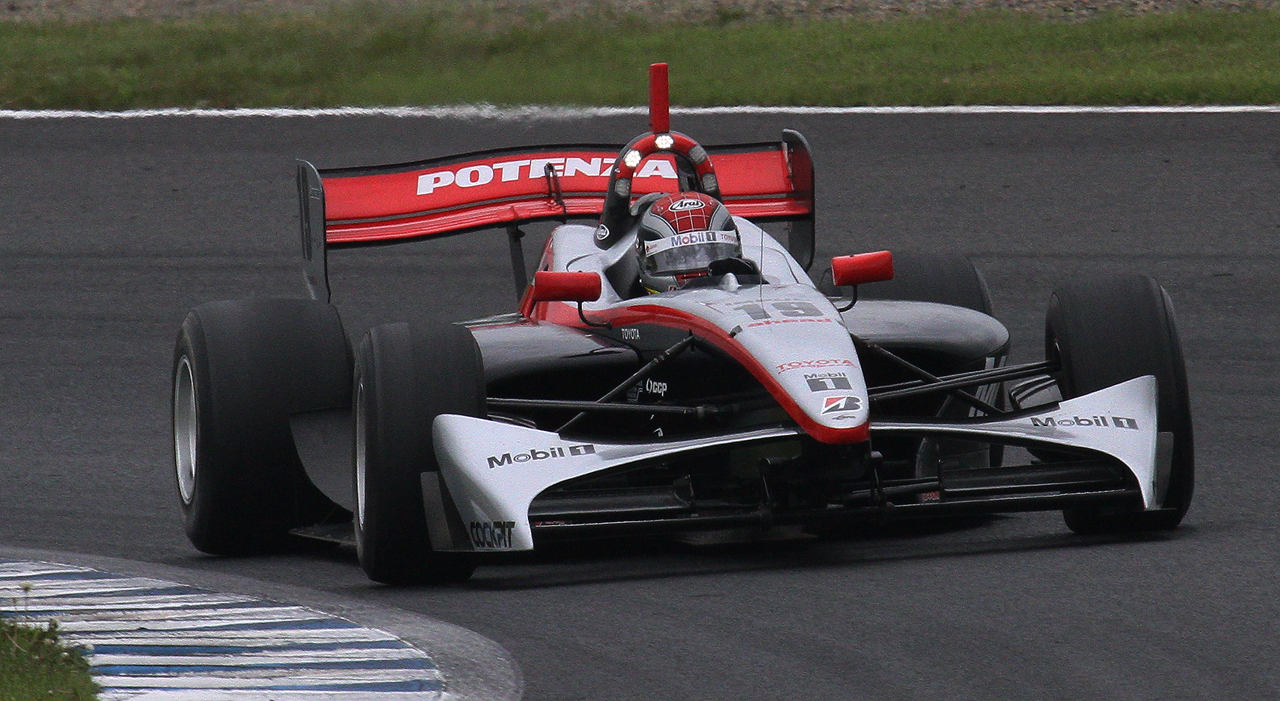
De Oliveira during practice for the first Motegi round of the 2010 Formula Nippon season, where he won from pole position with fastest lap.

Born in São Paulo, de Oliveira competed in kart racing only in 1997, then he moved on to Brazilian national Formula Ford and Formula Chevrolet championships in 1998.

Beginning in 1999, de Oliveira started competing in Formula Three category. He won the 1999 South American Formula Three (Class B), the 2003 German Formula Three, and the 2005 Japanese Formula Three championships.

In 2006, de Oliveira debuted in the Super GT with a Hasemi Nissan Z GT500. He continued as a Nissan Super GT driver with Kondo (2007-2010, 2017) and Impul (2011-2016). He won two titles, in 2020 and 2022, was runner-up in 2015, and claimed nine wins and nineteen podiums overall.

Also in 2006, de Oliveira entered the last round of the Formula Nippon with 5Zigen. He also drove in Formula Nippon for Kondo in 2007 and 2008. After skipping 2009, he returned in 2010 with Impul. He won one title in 2020, was runner-up in 2014, and won ten races and earned 23 podiums in the category. He retired from formula racing after the 2016 season.

De Oliveira made his World Touring Car Championship debut at the 2009 FIA WTCC Race of Japan for SUNRED Engineering. He drove as a wildcard entry in the finale round of the 2019 World Touring Car Cup at Sepang International Circuit in a Honda Civic Type R TCR run by KCMG. He qualified 13th with a time of 2:14.746. In race one, de Oliveira's experience on the track allowed him to finish the race in fifth overall and set the fastest lap of the track, and even assist championship contender Esteban Guerrieri. He dropped to eighteenth in race two, which was followed by a retirement in race 3 on lap 10 from 25th on the grid. His fifth place is the best position a wildcard driver had in 2019.

De Oliveira joined the Vanwall Racing Team in June 2023 to race in the FIA World Endurance Championship, replacing the departing Tom Dillmann; he had previously spoken of a desire to drive for the team and hoped to "escape his comfort zone". De Oliveira was scheduled to compete in the Monza and Fuji rounds of the championship; he would not compete at Bahrain due to clashing commitments with Super GT.

== Racing record ==
=== Career summary ===
Season	Series	Team	Races	Wins	Poles	F/Laps	Podiums	Points	Position
1999	Formula 3 Sudamericana	Cesário Fórmula	18	?	?	?	?	26	12th
1999	Formula 3 Sudamericana - Light	Cesário Fórmula	18	9	10	9	14	244	**1st**
2000	Formula 3 Sudamericana	Cesário F3	18	5	7	7	11	228	**2nd**
2001	German Formula 3 Championship	Swiss Racing Team	20	1	3	1	4	116	7th
2001	Masters of Formula 3	Swiss Racing Team	1	0	0	0	0	N/A	13th
2001	Korea Super Prix	Swiss Racing Team	1	0	0	0	0	N/A	18th
2001	FIA European Formula Three Cup	Swiss Racing Team	1	0	0	0	0	N/A	NC
2001	Macau Grand Prix	Swiss Racing Team	1	0	0	0	0	N/A	NC
2001	Formula 3 Sudamericana	Cesário Fórmula	1	0	0	1	0	0†	NC†
2002	German Formula 3 Championship	Team Kolles Racing	12	0	0	2	0	16	12th
2002	German Formula 3 Championship	JB Motorsport	2	0	0	0	0	16	12th
2002	Masters of Formula 3	JB Motorsport	1	0	0	0	0	N/A	16th
2003	German Formula 3 Championship	JB Motorsport	16	13	12	15	15	329	**1st**
2003	Austria Formula 3 Cup	JB Motorsport	2	2	1	2	2	23	9th
2003	Masters of Formula 3	JB Motorsport	1	0	0	0	0	N/A	12th
2003	British Formula 3 Championship	Alan Docking Racing	4	0	0	0	0	0	NC
2004	Japanese Formula 3 Championship	Dome Project	19	6	8	10	11	211	**2nd**
2005	Japanese Formula 3 Championship	TOM'S	20	7	8	8	16	300	**1st**
2005	Macau Grand Prix	TOM'S	1	0	0	0	0	N/A	4th
2006	Super GT - GT500	Hasemi Motorsport	9	0	0	0	0	32	15th
2006	Formula Nippon	5Zigen	1	0	0	0	0	0	NC
2007	Super GT - GT500	Kondo Racing	9	1	0	0	1	34	10th
2007	Formula Nippon	Kondo Racing	9	0	0	0	1	18	8th
2008	Super GT - GT500	Kondo Racing	9	1	0	0	1	34	14th
2008	Formula Nippon	Kondo Racing	11	1	1	0	3	33	6th
2009	Super GT - GT500	Kondo Racing	9	1	0	0	2	48	8th
2009	World Touring Car Championship	SUNRED	2	0	0	0	0	0	NC
2010	Super GT - GT500	Kondo Racing	7	1	0	0	1	32	10th
2010	Formula Nippon	Team Impul	8	2	2	2	5	47.5	**1st**
2011	Super GT - GT500	Team Impul	8	1	0	0	3	49	5th
2011	Formula Nippon	Team Impul	7	1	2	2	2	28	**3rd**
2011	IndyCar Series	Conquest Racing	1	0	0	0	0	10	44th
2012	Super GT - GT500	Team Impul	8	1	1	1	1	45	4th
2012	Formula Nippon	Team Impul	8	1	2	3	3	34.5	5th
2013	Super GT - GT500	Team Impul	8	1	1	0	1	46	9th
2013	Super Formula	Team Impul	8	0	0	0	1	19	5th
2014	Super GT - GT500	Team Impul	8	1	1	1	4	60	6th
2014	Super Formula	Team Impul	9	3	2	6	5	39.5	**2nd**
2015	Super GT - GT500	Team Impul	8	0	1	0	4	74	**2nd**
2015	Super Formula	Team Impul	8	1	0	2	3	34	4th
2016	Super GT - GT500	Team Impul	8	1	2	0	1	43	8th
2016	Super Formula	Team Impul	9	1	0	0	1	15.5	7th
2017	Super GT - GT500	Kondo Racing	8	0	1	1	0	12	16th
2018	Super GT - GT500	Kondō Racing	8	0	0	0	0	23	14th
2018	Super Formula	Vantelin Team TOM'S	1	0	0	0	0	0	23rd
2018	Stock Car Brasil	Eurofarma RC	1	1	1	1	1	0	NC†
2019	Super GT - GT300	D'station Racing AMR	8	0	0	0	0	0	NC
2019	World Touring Car Cup	KCMG	3	0	0	1	0	0	NC†
2019	Intercontinental GT Challenge	KCMG	1	0	0	0	0	0	NC
2019	24 Hours of Nürburgring - SP9	KCMG	1	0	0	0	0	N/A	DNF
2020	Super GT - GT300	Kondo Racing	7	2	0	0	3	71	**1st**
2020	Super Taikyu - ST-Z	SS/YZ Studie	1	0	1	1	1	84‡	4th‡
2021	Super GT - GT300	Kondo Racing	8	1	0	0	3	55	**2nd**
2021	Super Taikyu - ST-Z	SS/YZ Racing with Studie	1	0	0	1	1	74‡	4th‡
2022	Super GT - GT300	Kondo Racing	8	1	0	0	2	52	**1st**
2023	Super GT - GT300	Kondō Racing	8	1	1	0	1	50	**3rd**
2023	FIA World Endurance Championship - Hypercar	Floyd Vanwall Racing Team	2	0	0	0	0	0	22nd
2024	Super GT - GT300	Kondo Racing	8	0	0	0	2	32	7th
2024	GT World Challenge Asia	Craft-Bamboo Racing	2	0	0	?	0	0	NC
2024	Super Taikyu - ST-X	Craft-Bamboo Racing	1	0	1	0	1	130‡	**2nd‡**
2025	Super GT - GT300	Kondo Racing	6	0	0	1	2	75.5	4th
2025	Stock Car Pro Series	TGR Team Full Time Sports	19	0	0	0	2	443	21st
2025	Super Taikyu - ST-X	Seven x Seven Racing	1	0	0	0	1	129‡	**1st‡**
2026	Super GT - GT300	Kondo Racing	8	1	0	0	2	88	**1st**
2026	Super Taikyu - ST-X	Craft-Bamboo Racing	1	0	0	0	0	113‡	**3rd‡**
2026	Intercontinental GT Challenge	Craft-Bamboo Racing	1	0	0	0	0	0	NC

^{†} As de Oliveira was a guest driver, he was ineligible for points. As de Oliveira was a wildcard entry in the WTCR, he was not eligible for points.
‡ Team standings. ^{*} Season still in progress.

=== Complete Formula Nippon / Super Formula results ===
(key) (Races in bold indicate pole position) (Races in italics indicate fastest lap)

Year	Team	Engine	1	2	3	4	5	6	7	8	9	10	11	DC	Points
2006	Team 5Zigen	Honda	FUJ	SUZ	MOT	SUZ	AUT	FUJ	SUG	MOT	SUZ; 8			NC	0
2007	Kondo Racing	Toyota	FUJ; Ret	SUZ; 14	MOT; 8	OKA; 4	SUZ; 7	FUJ; 6	SUG; Ret	MOT; 8	SUZ; 3			8th	18
2008	Kondo Racing	Toyota	FUJ; Ret	SUZ; Ret	MOT; 9	OKA; 11	SUZ; 4	SUZ; 5	MOT; 3	MOT; 3	**FUJ**; 1	FUJ; 8	SUG; 6	6th	33
2010	Team Impul	Toyota	SUZ; 2	**MOT**; 1	FUJ; 3	MOT; 6	SUG; 11	AUT; 2	SUZ; 4	**SUZ**; 1				1st	47.5
2011	Team Impul	Toyota	SUZ; 6	AUT; 4	**FUJ**; 4	**MOT**; 1	SUZ; C	SUG; DSQ	MOT; 9	MOT; 3				3rd	28
2012	Team Impul	Toyota	SUZ; 3	MOT; 2	AUT; Ret	FUJ; 6	**MOT**; 1	SUG; 6	SUZ; 4	**SUZ**; Ret				5th	34.5
2013	Lenovo Team Impul	Toyota	SUZ; 6	AUT; 4	FUJ; 6	MOT; 4	SUG; Ret	SUZ; 3	SUZ; 17					5th	19
2014	Lenovo Team Impul	Toyota	SUZ; 7	**FUJ**; 1	FUJ; 2	FUJ; 14	**MOT**; 1	AUT; 3	SUG; Ret	SUZ; 1	SUZ; 4			2nd	39.5
2015	Lenovo Team Impul	Toyota	SUZ; 4	OKA; 5	FUJ; 1	MOT; 3	AUT; 5	SUG; 7	SUZ; Ret	SUZ; 3				4th	34
2016	Itochu Enex Team Impul	Toyota	SUZ; 10	OKA; 19	FUJ; 1	MOT; Ret	OKA; 8	OKA; 5	SUG; Ret	SUZ; 8	SUZ; 4			7th	15.5
2018	Vantelin Team TOM'S	Toyota	SUZ	AUT	SUG	FUJ	MOT; 18	OKA	SUZ					23rd	0

=== Complete Super GT results ===
(key) (Races in bold indicate pole position) (Races in italics indicate fastest lap)

Year	Team	Car	Class	1	2	3	4	5	6	7	8	9	DC	Points
2006	Hasemi Motorsport	Nissan Z	GT500	SUZ; 9	OKA; 4	FUJ; 12	SEP; 7	SUG; 13	SUZ; 8	MOT; 11	AUT; 8	FUJ; 8	15th	32
2007	Kondo Racing	Nissan Z	GT500	SUZ; Ret	OKA; 15	FUJ; Ret	SEP; 1	SUG; 10	SUZ; 10	MOT; 5	AUT; Ret	FUJ; 5	10th	34
2008	Kondo Racing	Nissan GT-R	GT500	SUZ; 5	OKA; 8	FUJ; 11	SEP; 1	SUG; 8	SUZ; 7	MOT; 14	AUT; 16	FUJ; 15	14th	34
2009	Kondo Racing	Nissan GT-R	GT500	OKA; 1	SUZ; 8	FUJ; 4	SEP; 5	SUG; 13	SUZ; 11	FUJ; 13	AUT; 3	MOT; 11	8th	48
2010	Kondo Racing	Nissan GT-R	GT500	SUZ; 1	OKA; 12	FUJ; 8	SEP; 9	SUG; 5	SUZ; Ret	FUJ; C	MOT; 10		10th	32
2011	Team Impul	Nissan GT-R	GT500	OKA; 1	FUJ; 14	SEP; 15	SUG; 13	SUZ; 3	FUJ; 2	AUT; 10	MOT; 9		5th	49
2012	Team Impul	Nissan GT-R	GT500	OKA; 10	FUJ; 5	SEP; 5	SUG; Ret	SUZ; 4	**FUJ**; 1	AUT; 10	MOT; 10		4th	45
2013	Team Impul	Nissan GT-R	GT500	OKA; 6	FUJ; 5	**SEP**; 1	SUG; Ret	SUZ; 4	FUJ; 6	AUT; Ret	MOT; 13		9th	46
2014	Team Impul	Nissan GT-R	GT500	OKA; 3	**FUJ**; 1	AUT; 3	SUG; 9	FUJ; 8	SUZ; 10	BUR; 3	MOT; 13		6th	60
2015	Team Impul	Nissan GT-R	GT500	OKA; 7	FUJ; 2	CHA; 4	FUJ; 3	SUZ; 3	SUG; 11	**AUT**; 2	MOT; 4		2nd	74
2016	Team Impul	Nissan GT-R	GT500	OKA; 5	**FUJ**; 11	SUG; Ret	**FUJ**; 1	SUZ; Ret	CHA; 4	MOT; 7	MOT; 8		8th	43
2017	Kondo Racing	Nissan GT-R	GT500	OKA; 10	FUJ; 12	AUT; 9	SUG; Ret	FUJ; 13	**SUZ**; 5	CHA; Ret	MOT; 12		16th	12
2018	Kondo Racing	Nissan GT-R	GT500	OKA; 6	FUJ; 13	SUZ; 9	CHA; Ret	FUJ; 6	SUG; 6	AUT; 7	MOT; 10		14th	23
2019	D'station Racing AMR	Aston Martin Vantage AMR GT3	GT300	OKA; Ret	FUJ; 27	SUZ; Ret	CHA; 19	FUJ; 11	AUT; 18	SUG; 24	MOT; 17		32nd	0
2020	Kondo Racing	Nissan GT-R Nismo GT3	GT300	FUJ; 4	FUJ; 5	SUZ; 9	MOT; 20	FUJ; 1	SUZ; 16	MOT; 1	FUJ; 2		1st	71
2021	Kondo Racing	Nissan GT-R Nismo GT3	GT300	OKA; 1	FUJ; 7	SUZ; 26	MOT; 8	SUG; 3	AUT; 11	MOT; 3	FUJ; 5		2nd	55
2022	Kondo Racing	Nissan GT-R Nismo GT3	GT300	OKA; 1	FUJ; 7‡	SUZ; 3	FUJ; 6	SUZ; 13	SUG; 4	AUT; 5	MOT; 19		1st	52
2023	Kondo Racing	Nissan GT-R Nismo GT3	GT300	OKA; 10	**FUJ**; 1	SUZ; 4	FUJ; 4	SUZ; Ret	SUG; 10	AUT; 5	MOT; 6		3rd	50
2024	Kondo Racing	Nissan GT-R Nismo GT3	GT300	OKA; 15	FUJ; 2	SUZ; 16	FUJ; 3	SUG; 11	AUT; 12	MOT; 8	SUZ; Ret		7th	32
2025	Kondo Racing	Nissan GT-R Nismo GT3	GT300	OKA; 3	FUJ	SEP	FUJ; 11	FUJ (10)	SUZ; 8	SUG; 2	AUT; 4	MOT; 4	4th	75.5
2026	Kondo Racing	Nissan GT-R Nismo GT3	GT300	OKA; 14	FUJ; 1	FUJ; 5	SUZ; 5	SUG; 2	AUT; 14	MOT; 14	MOT; 4		1st	88

^{‡} Half points awarded as less than 75% of race distance was completed. ^{(Number)} Driver did not take part in this sprint race, points are still awarded for the teammate's result.

=== Complete World Touring Car Championship results ===
(key) (Races in bold indicate pole position) (Races in italics indicate fastest lap)

Year	Team	Car	1	2	3	4	5	6	7	8	9	10	11	12	13	14	15	16	17	18	19	20	21	22	23	24	DC	Points
2009	SUNRED Engineering	SEAT León 2.0 TFSI	BRA; 1	BRA; 2	MEX; 1	MEX; 2	MAR; 1	MAR; 2	FRA; 1	FRA; 2	ESP; 1	ESP; 2	CZE; 1	CZE; 2	POR; 1	POR; 2	GBR; 1	GBR; 2	GER; 1	GER; 2	ITA; 1	ITA; 2	JPN; 1; 23	JPN; 2; 19	MAC; 1	MAC; 2	NC	0

=== American open–wheel racing results ===
(key)

==== IndyCar Series ====
Year	Team	No.	Chassis	Engine	1	2	3	4	5	6	7	8	9	10	11	12	13	14	15	16	17	18	Rank	Points	Ref
2011	Conquest Racing	34	Dallara	Honda	STP	ALA	LBH	SAO	INDY	TXS	TXS	MIL	IOW	TOR	EDM	MDO	NHM	SNM	BAL	MOT; 26	KTY	LVS	44th	10	

=== Complete World Touring Car Cup results ===
(key) (Races in bold indicate pole position) (Races in italics indicate fastest lap)

Year	Team	Car	1	2	3	4	5	6	7	8	9	10	11	12	13	14	15	16	17	18	19	20	21	22	23	24	25	26	27	28	29	30	DC	Points
2019	KCMG	Honda Civic Type R TCR (FK8)	MAR; 1	MAR; 2	MAR; 3	HUN; 1	HUN; 2	HUN; 3	SVK; 1	SVK; 2	SVK; 3	NED; 1	NED; 2	NED; 3	GER; 1	GER; 2	GER; 3	POR; 1	POR; 2	POR; 3	CHN; 1	CHN; 2	CHN; 3	JPN; 1	JPN; 2	JPN; 3	MAC; 1	MAC; 2	MAC; 3	MAL; 1; 5	MAL; 2; 18	MAL; 3 Ret	NC‡	0‡

^{‡} As de Oliveira was a Wildcard entry, he was ineligible to score points.

=== Complete FIA World Endurance Championship results ===
(key) (Races in bold indicate pole position) (Races in italics indicate fastest lap)

Year	Entrant	Class	Chassis	Engine	1	2	3	4	5	6	7	Rank	Points
2023	Floyd Vanwall Racing Team	Hypercar	Vanwall Vandervell 680	Gibson GL458 4.5 L V8	SEB	ALG	SPA	LMS	MNZ; 12	FUJ; 11	BHR	22nd	0

=== Complete Stock Car Pro Series results ===
(key) (Races in bold indicate pole position) (Races in italics indicate fastest lap)

Year	Team	Car	1	2	3	4	5	6	7	8	9	10	11	12	13	14	15	16	17	18	19	20	21	22	23	Rank	Points
2018	Eurofarma RC	Chevrolet Cruze	**INT**; **1**; 1	CUR; 1	CUR; 2	VEL; 1	VEL; 2	LON; 1	LON; 2	SCZ; 1	SCZ; 2	GOI; 1	MOU; 1	MOU; 2	CAS; 1	CAS; 2	VCA; 1	VCA; 2	TAR; 1	TAR; 2	GOI; 1	GOI; 2	INT; 1			NC†	0†
2025	Full Time Gazoo Racing	Toyota Corolla Cross	INT; 1; 13	CAS; 1; 26	CAS; 2; 16	VEL; 1; 11	VEL; 2; 9	VCA; 1; 29	VCA; 2; 12	CRS; 1; 20	CRS; 2 Ret	CAS; 1; 3	CAS; 2; 19	VCA; 1; 2	VCA; 2; 6	VCA; 1 Ret	VCA; 2; 9	MOU; 1; 23	MOU; 2; 15	CUI; 1; 8	CUI; 2; 15	BRA; 1 WD	BRA; 2 WD	INT; 1	INT; 2	21st	443

^{†} As de Oliveira was a guest driver, he was ineligible for points.

Sporting positions
Preceded by Gary Paffett	German Formula 3 Championship; Champion; 2003	Succeeded by Bastian Kolmsee
Preceded by Ronnie Quintarelli	Japanese Formula 3 Championship; Champion; 2005	Succeeded by Adrian Sutil
Preceded by Loïc Duval	Formula Nippon; Champion; 2010	Succeeded by André Lotterer
Preceded by Nirei Fukuzumi; Shinichi Takagi	Super GT; GT300 Champion; 2020; With: Kiyoto Fujinami	Succeeded by Takuto Iguchi; Hideki Yamauchi
Preceded by Takuto Iguchi; Hideki Yamauchi	Super GT; GT300 Champion; 2022; With: Kiyoto Fujinami	Succeeded by Hiroki Yoshida; Kohta Kawaai
Preceded by Naoya Gamou; Togo Suganami	Super GT; GT300 Champion; 2026; With: Iori Kimura	Succeeded by Incumbent
