= 2000 All Japan Grand Touring Car Championship =

Motorsport championship

The 2000 All Japan Grand Touring Car Championship was the eighth season of Japan Automobile Federation GT premiere racing. It was marked as well as the eighteenth season of a JAF-sanctioned sports car racing championship dating back to the All Japan Sports Prototype Championship. The GT500 class drivers' champion of 2000 was Ryō Michigami driving the No. 16 Castrol Mugen Honda NSX, with Mugen x Dome Project winning the teams' championship. The GT300 class drivers' champion was the No. 26 Advan Team Taisan Jr Porsche 996 driven by Hideo Fukuyama.

This season marked the first of several instances where the series champion had not won a single race throughout the season, with Michigami scoring four second places as the season champion's best finish. This phenomenon would occur again in 2001 (in GT500 only) and 2003 (in both GT500 and GT300).

== Drivers and teams ==
=== GT500 ===
Team	Make	Car	Engine	No.	Drivers	Tyre	Rounds
Nismo	Nissan	Nissan Skyline GT-R	Nissan RB26DETT 2.7 L Twin Turbo I6	1	(France) Érik Comas	B	All
Nismo	Nissan	Nissan Skyline GT-R	Nissan RB26DETT 2.7 L Twin Turbo I6	1	(Japan) Masami Kageyama	B	All
Nismo	Nissan	Nissan Skyline GT-R	Nissan RB26DETT 2.7 L Twin Turbo I6	2	(Germany) Michael Krumm	B	All
Nismo	Nissan	Nissan Skyline GT-R	Nissan RB26DETT 2.7 L Twin Turbo I6	2	(Japan) Yuji Ide	B	1
Nismo	Nissan	Nissan Skyline GT-R	Nissan RB26DETT 2.7 L Twin Turbo I6	2	(Japan) Ukyo Katayama	B	2–7, NC
Hasemi Motorsport	Nissan	Nissan Skyline GT-R	Nissan RB26DETT 2.7 L Twin Turbo I6	3	(Japan) Masahiro Hasemi	B	All
Hasemi Motorsport	Nissan	Nissan Skyline GT-R	Nissan RB26DETT 2.7 L Twin Turbo I6	3	(Japan) Tetsuya Tanaka	B	All
Esso Toyota Team LeMans	Toyota	Toyota Supra	Toyota 3S-GT 2.0 L Turbo I4	6	(Australia) Wayne Gardner	B	All
Esso Toyota Team LeMans	Toyota	Toyota Supra	Toyota 3S-GT 2.0 L Turbo I4	6	(Japan) Hideki Noda	B	All
Autobacs Racing Team Aguri	Honda	Honda NSX	Honda C32B 3.5 L V6	8	(Japan) Aguri Suzuki	B	All
Autobacs Racing Team Aguri	Honda	Honda NSX	Honda C32B 3.5 L V6	8	(Japan) Keiichi Tsuchiya	B	All
Calsonic Team Impul	Nissan	Nissan Skyline GT-R	Nissan RB26DETT 2.7 L Twin Turbo I6	12	(Japan) Kazuyoshi Hoshino	B	All
Calsonic Team Impul	Nissan	Nissan Skyline GT-R	Nissan RB26DETT 2.7 L Twin Turbo I6	12	(Japan) Satoshi Motoyama	B	All
Team Sri Lanka	RGS	RGS Mirage GT1	Chevrolet LS1 6.7 L V8	15	(Sri Lanka) Dilantha Malagamuwa	Y	4, 6
Team Sri Lanka	RGS	RGS Mirage GT1	Chevrolet LS1 6.7 L V8	15	(Japan) Hideyuki Tamamoto	Y	4, 6
Team Sri Lanka	RGS	RGS Mirage GT1	Chevrolet LS1 6.7 L V8	69	(Sri Lanka) Dilantha Malagamuwa	Y	2–3
Team Sri Lanka	RGS	RGS Mirage GT1	Chevrolet LS1 6.7 L V8	69	(United Kingdom) Steve Young	Y	2
Team Sri Lanka	RGS	RGS Mirage GT1	Chevrolet LS1 6.7 L V8	69	(Japan) Hideyuki Tamamoto	Y	3
Mugen x Dome Project	Honda	Honda NSX	Honda C32B 3.5 L V6	16	(Japan) Ryō Michigami	B	All
Mugen x Dome Project	Honda	Honda NSX	Honda C32B 3.5 L V6	16	(Japan) Osamu Nakako	B	1–4, NC
Mugen x Dome Project	Honda	Honda NSX	Honda C32B 3.5 L V6	16	(Japan) Hidetoshi Mitsusada	B	5–7
Mugen x Dome Project	Honda	Honda NSX	Honda C32B 3.5 L V6	18	(Japan) Katsutomo Kaneishi	B	All
Mugen x Dome Project	Honda	Honda NSX	Honda C32B 3.5 L V6	18	(Japan) Juichi Wakisaka	B	All
Hitotsuyama Racing	McLaren	McLaren F1 GTR	BMW S70/2 6.0 L V12	21	(Japan) Akihiko Nakaya	D	1–7
Hitotsuyama Racing	McLaren	McLaren F1 GTR	BMW S70/2 6.0 L V12	21	(Japan) Mikio Hitotsuyama	D	1–3, 5–7
Hitotsuyama Racing	McLaren	McLaren F1 GTR	BMW S70/2 6.0 L V12	21	(Japan) Yasushi Hitotsuyama	D	4
Tsuchiya Engineering	Toyota	Toyota Supra	Toyota 3S-GT 2.0 L Turbo I4	25	(Japan) Mitsuhiro Kinoshita	Y	All
Tsuchiya Engineering	Toyota	Toyota Supra	Toyota 3S-GT 2.0 L Turbo I4	25	(Japan) Manabu Orido	Y	All
Team Take One	McLaren	McLaren F1 GTR	BMW S70/2 6.0 L V12	30	(Japan) Hideki Okada	B	1–7
Team Take One	McLaren	McLaren F1 GTR	BMW S70/2 6.0 L V12	30	(Japan) Yoji Yamada	B	1–4
Team Take One	McLaren	McLaren F1 GTR	BMW S70/2 6.0 L V12	30	(Japan) Tsugio Matsuda	B	5–7
Toyota Team Cerumo	Toyota	Toyota Supra	Toyota 3S-GT 2.0 L Turbo I4	32	(Japan) Masahiko Kondo	B	All
Toyota Team Cerumo	Toyota	Toyota Supra	Toyota 3S-GT 2.0 L Turbo I4	32	(Japan) Takayuki Kinoshita	B	1–7
Toyota Team Cerumo	Toyota	Toyota Supra	Toyota 3S-GT 2.0 L Turbo I4	32	(Japan) Yuji Tachikawa	B	NC
Toyota Team Cerumo	Toyota	Toyota Supra	Toyota 3S-GT 2.0 L Turbo I4	38	(Japan) Yuji Tachikawa	B	1–7
Toyota Team Cerumo	Toyota	Toyota Supra	Toyota 3S-GT 2.0 L Turbo I4	38	(Japan) Hironori Takeuchi	B	1–7
Toyota Team TOM'S	Toyota	Toyota Supra	Toyota 3S-GT 2.0 L Turbo I4	35	(Japan) Shinichi Yamaji	M	1–7
Toyota Team TOM'S	Toyota	Toyota Supra	Toyota 3S-GT 2.0 L Turbo I4	35	(France) Pierre-Henri Raphanel	M	1–7
Toyota Team TOM'S	Toyota	Toyota Supra	Toyota 3S-GT 2.0 L Turbo I4	36	(Japan) Masanori Sekiya	M	All
Toyota Team TOM'S	Toyota	Toyota Supra	Toyota 3S-GT 2.0 L Turbo I4	36	(Japan) Takeshi Tsuchiya	M	All
Toyota Team TOM'S	Toyota	Toyota Supra	Toyota 3S-GT 2.0 L Turbo I4	37	(Japan) Seiji Ara	M	All
Toyota Team TOM'S	Toyota	Toyota Supra	Toyota 3S-GT 2.0 L Turbo I4	37	(Japan) Toshio Suzuki	M	1–7
Toyota Team TOM'S	Toyota	Toyota Supra	Toyota 3S-GT 2.0 L Turbo I4	37	(Japan) Shinichi Yamaji	M	NC
Denso Toyota Team SARD	Toyota	Toyota Supra	Toyota 3S-GT 2.0 L Turbo I4	39	(Republic of Ireland) Ralph Firman	Y	All
Denso Toyota Team SARD	Toyota	Toyota Supra	Toyota 3S-GT 2.0 L Turbo I4	39	(Japan) Masahiko Kageyama	Y	All
Team Taisan Advan	Chrysler	Chrysler Viper GTS-R	Chrysler EWB 8.0 L V10	55	(Japan) Hiroaki Suga	Y	1–2
Team Taisan Advan	Chrysler	Chrysler Viper GTS-R	Chrysler EWB 8.0 L V10	55	(Japan) Shinsuke Shibahara	Y	1–2
Team Taisan Advan	Chrysler	Chrysler Viper GTS-R	Chrysler EWB 8.0 L V10	55	(Japan) Eiji Yamada	Y	4–5, NC
Team Taisan Advan	Chrysler	Chrysler Viper GTS-R	Chrysler EWB 8.0 L V10	55	(Japan) Takahide Tasaki	Y	4–5
Team Taisan Advan	Chrysler	Chrysler Viper GTS-R	Chrysler EWB 8.0 L V10	55	(Sri Lanka) Dilantha Malagamuwa	Y	NC
Mobil 1 Nakajima Racing	Honda	Honda NSX	Honda C32B 3.5 L V6	64	(Japan) Daisuke Ito	B	All
Mobil 1 Nakajima Racing	Honda	Honda NSX	Honda C32B 3.5 L V6	64	(Germany) Dominik Schwager	B	All
JLOC	Lamborghini	Lamborghini Diablo GT-1	Lamborghini L532 6.0 L V12	88	(Japan) Naohiro Furuya	D	All
JLOC	Lamborghini	Lamborghini Diablo GT-1	Lamborghini L532 6.0 L V12	88	(Japan) Tsuyoshi Takahashi	D	All
Raybrig Team Kunimitsu with Mooncraft	Honda	Honda NSX	Honda C32B 3.5 L V6	100	(Japan) Akira Iida	B	All
Raybrig Team Kunimitsu with Mooncraft	Honda	Honda NSX	Honda C32B 3.5 L V6	100	(Japan) Naoki Hattori	B	All

=== GT300 ===
Team	Make	Car	Engine	No.	Drivers	Tyre	Rounds
Porsche Club Malaysia	Porsche	Porsche 993 RS	Porsche M64/60 3.6 L Turbo F6	5	(Malaysia) Key Soon Yue	M	NC
Porsche Club Malaysia	Porsche	Porsche 993 RS	Porsche M64/60 3.6 L Turbo F6	5	(Malaysia) Ila Ridak	M	NC
RE Amemiya Racing	Mazda	Mazda RX-7	Mazda RE20B 2.0 L 3-rotor	7	(Japan) Tetsuya Yamano	Y	All
RE Amemiya Racing	Mazda	Mazda RX-7	Mazda RE20B 2.0 L 3-rotor	7	(Japan) Haruhiko Matsumoto	Y	All
Team Daikokuya	Porsche	Porsche 993 RSR	Porsche M64/80 3.8 L F6	9	(Japan) Tsunefumi Hioki	D	1–2, 4–5, 7
Team Daikokuya	Porsche	Porsche 993 RSR	Porsche M64/80 3.8 L F6	9	(Japan) Shuroku Sasaki	D	1
Team Daikokuya	Porsche	Porsche 993 RSR	Porsche M64/80 3.8 L F6	9	(Japan) Yukihiro Hane	D	2, 5
Team Daikokuya	Porsche	Porsche 993 RSR	Porsche M64/80 3.8 L F6	9	(Japan) Akira Watanabe	D	4, 7
Team Daikokuya	Porsche	Porsche 993 RSR	Porsche M64/80 3.8 L F6	27	(Japan) Kota Sasaki	D	1
Team Daikokuya	Porsche	Porsche 993 RSR	Porsche M64/80 3.8 L F6	27	(Japan) Seigo Nishizawa	D	1
Team Daikokuya	Porsche	Porsche 993 RSR	Porsche M64/80 3.8 L F6	27	(Japan) Akira Hirakawa	D	5
Team Daikokuya	Porsche	Porsche 993 RSR	Porsche M64/80 3.8 L F6	27	(Japan) Toshihide Hashimura	D	5
Ability Motorsport	Porsche	Porsche 993 GT2	Porsche M64/82 3.6 L Turbo F6	10	(Japan) Yasutaka Hinoi	Y	1–4
Ability Motorsport	Porsche	Porsche 993 GT2	Porsche M64/82 3.6 L Turbo F6	10	(Japan) Yutaka Yamagishi	Y	1–4
Ability Motorsport	Porsche	Porsche 993 GT2	Porsche M64/82 3.6 L Turbo F6	11	(Japan) Kengo Kitaura	Y	1–5, 7
Ability Motorsport	Porsche	Porsche 993 GT2	Porsche M64/82 3.6 L Turbo F6	11	(Japan) Hikaru Miyagi	Y	1–4
Ability Motorsport	Porsche	Porsche 993 GT2	Porsche M64/82 3.6 L Turbo F6	11	(Japan) Yasutaka Hinoi	Y	5–7
Ability Motorsport	Porsche	Porsche 993 GT2	Porsche M64/82 3.6 L Turbo F6	11	(Japan) Jun Kinoshita	Y	6
Racing Project Bandoh	Toyota	Toyota Celica	Toyota 3S-GE 2.0 L I4	19	(Japan) Shigekazu Wakisaka	Y	All
Racing Project Bandoh	Toyota	Toyota Celica	Toyota 3S-GE 2.0 L I4	19	(Japan) Takahiro Hara	Y	All
TOM'S Spirit	Toyota	Toyota MR-S	Toyota 3S-GTE 2.0 L Turbo I4	20	(Japan) Masahiro Matsunaga	Y	4–7
TOM'S Spirit	Toyota	Toyota MR-S	Toyota 3S-GTE 2.0 L Turbo I4	20	(Japan) Kumi Sato	Y	4–7
MTCI Racing Team	Porsche	Porsche 986 Boxster	Porsche M64/75 3.6 L F6	24	(Japan) Kazuyuki Nishizawa	Y	All
MTCI Racing Team	Porsche	Porsche 986 Boxster	Porsche M64/75 3.6 L F6	24	(Italy) Marco Apicella	Y	All
Team Taisan	Porsche	Porsche 996 GT3-R	Porsche M64/75 3.6 L F6	26	(Japan) Hideshi Matsuda	Y	All
Team Taisan	Porsche	Porsche 996 GT3-R	Porsche M64/75 3.6 L F6	26	(Japan) Hideo Fukuyama	Y	All
Team Taisan	Porsche	Porsche 996 GT3-R	Porsche M64/75 3.6 L F6	26	(Japan) Atsushi Yogo	Y	NC
Team Taisan	Porsche	Porsche 996 GT3-R	Porsche M64/75 3.6 L F6	28	(Japan) Hiroaki Suga	Y	All
Team Taisan	Porsche	Porsche 996 GT3-R	Porsche M64/75 3.6 L F6	28	(Japan) Shinsuke Shibahara	Y	All
Team Taisan	Chrysler	Chrysler Viper GTS-R	Chrysler EWB 8.0 L V10	55	(Japan) Eiji Yamada	Y	6–7
Team Taisan	Chrysler	Chrysler Viper GTS-R	Chrysler EWB 8.0 L V10	55	(Japan) Takahide Tasaki	Y	6–7
Super Autobacs Racing with A'PEX	Toyota	Toyota MR-S	Toyota 3S-GTE 2.0 L Turbo I4	31	(Japan) Morio Nitta	Y	All
Super Autobacs Racing with A'PEX	Toyota	Toyota MR-S	Toyota 3S-GTE 2.0 L Turbo I4	31	(Japan) Yudai Igarashi	Y	1–3
Super Autobacs Racing with A'PEX	Toyota	Toyota MR-S	Toyota 3S-GTE 2.0 L Turbo I4	31	(Japan) Shinichi Takagi	Y	4–7
Auto Staff Racing	Nissan	Nissan Silvia (S15)	Nissan SR20DET 2.1 L Turbo I4	51	(Japan) Seiichi Sodeyama	Y	2–7
Auto Staff Racing	Nissan	Nissan Silvia (S15)	Nissan SR20DET 2.1 L Turbo I4	51	(Japan) Eiji Yamada	Y	2–3
Auto Staff Racing	Nissan	Nissan Silvia (S15)	Nissan SR20DET 2.1 L Turbo I4	51	(Japan) Naofumi Omoto	Y	4–7
Team Gaikokuya	Porsche	Porsche 993 Turbo	Porsche M64/60 3.6 L Turbo F6	70	(Japan) Yoshimi Ishibashi	D	All
Team Gaikokuya	Porsche	Porsche 993 Turbo	Porsche M64/60 3.6 L Turbo F6	70	(Belgium) Patrick van Schoote	D	1–2, NC, 4, 7
Team Gaikokuya	Porsche	Porsche 993 Turbo	Porsche M64/60 3.6 L Turbo F6	70	(Japan) Nobuo Komiya	D	3, 5–6
SigmaTec Racing Team	Porsche	Porsche 993 GT2	Porsche M64/82 3.6 L Turbo F6	71	(Japan) Guts Jyonai	Y	2–7
SigmaTec Racing Team	Porsche	Porsche 993 GT2	Porsche M64/82 3.6 L Turbo F6	71	(Japan) Naohiro Kawano	Y	2–4
SigmaTec Racing Team	Porsche	Porsche 993 GT2	Porsche M64/82 3.6 L Turbo F6	71	(Japan) Masanobu Takenaka	Y	5–7
Cusco Racing	Subaru	Subaru Impreza WRX STI	Subaru EJ20 2.0 L Turbo F4	77	(Japan) Katsuo Kobayashi	Y	All
Cusco Racing	Subaru	Subaru Impreza WRX STI	Subaru EJ20 2.0 L Turbo F4	77	(Japan) Tatsuya Tanigawa	Y	All
Team Daishin	Nissan	Nissan Silvia (S15)	Nissan SR20DET 2.1 L Turbo I4	81	(Japan) Nobuyuki Ohyagi	Y	All
Team Daishin	Nissan	Nissan Silvia (S15)	Nissan SR20DET 2.1 L Turbo I4	81	(Japan) Takayuki Aoki	Y	All
KRAFT	Toyota	Toyota Corolla Sprinter Trueno (AE86)	Toyota 3S-GTE 2.0 L Turbo I4	86	(Japan) Minoru Tanaka	D	2–7
KRAFT	Toyota	Toyota Corolla Sprinter Trueno (AE86)	Toyota 3S-GTE 2.0 L Turbo I4	86	(Japan) Koji Matsuda	D	2–7
Team Mind	Toyota	Toyota Corolla (AE101)	Toyota 3S-GE 2.0 L I4	101	(Japan) Hiroshi Sasaki	Y	4
Team Mind	Toyota	Toyota Corolla (AE101)	Toyota 3S-GE 2.0 L I4	101	(Japan) Mamoru Suzuki	Y	4
Team Gainer	Ferrari	Ferrari F355	Ferrari F129B 3.5 L V8	111	(Japan) Junichi Ikura	Y	1, 2, 4–5, 7
Team Gainer	Ferrari	Ferrari F355	Ferrari F129B 3.5 L V8	111	(Japan) Yusei Maki	Y	1, 2, 4–5, 7
Dentaire ProJet Racing	Porsche	Porsche 993 RSR	Porsche M64/80 3.8 L F6	360	(Japan) Seigo Nishizawa	Y	4–5, 7
Dentaire ProJet Racing	Porsche	Porsche 993 RSR	Porsche M64/80 3.8 L F6	360	(Japan) Kota Sasaki	Y	4–5, 7
910 Racing	Porsche	Porsche 996 GT3 RS	Porsche M64/75 3.6 L F6	910	(Japan) Hisashi Wada	Y	All
910 Racing	Porsche	Porsche 996 GT3 RS	Porsche M64/75 3.6 L F6	910	(Japan) Atsushi Yogo	Y	All
910 Racing	Porsche	Porsche 996 GT3 RS	Porsche M64/75 3.6 L F6	911	(Japan) Masamitsu Ishihara	Y	1–4, 7
910 Racing	Porsche	Porsche 996 GT3 RS	Porsche M64/75 3.6 L F6	911	(Japan) Jukuchou Sunako	Y	1–4, 7

== Schedule ==
Round	Race	Circuit	Date
1	Motegi GT Championship Race	(Japan) Twin Ring Motegi	April 2
2	All Japan Fuji GT Race	(Japan) Fuji Speedway	May 4
3	SUGO GT Championship	(Japan) Sportsland SUGO	May 28
NC	Tmtouch Japan GT Championship Malaysia	(Malaysia) Sepang Circuit	June 25
4	Japan Special GT Cup	(Japan) Fuji Speedway	August 6
5	GT Championship in TI	(Japan) TI Circuit	September 10
6	CP Mine GT Race	(Japan) Mine Circuit	October 1
7	Suzuka GT 300 km	(Japan) Suzuka Circuit	October 22

== Season results ==
Round	Circuit	GT500 Winning Team	GT300 Winning Team
Round	Circuit	GT500 Winning Drivers	GT300 Winning Drivers
1	Twin Ring Motegi	#1 Loctite NISMO Nissan Skyline GT-R	#26 Advan Team Taisan Jr Porsche 996
1	Twin Ring Motegi	(Japan) Masami Kageyama (France) Érik Comas	(Japan) Hideo Fukuyama (Japan) Hideshi Matsuda
2	Mt. Fuji	#18 Takata Dome Honda NSX	#26 Advan Team Taisan Jr Porsche 996
2	Mt. Fuji	(Japan) Katsutomo Kaneishi (Japan) Juichi Wakisaka	(Japan) Hideo Fukuyama (Japan) Hideshi Matsuda
3	Sportsland SUGO	#64 Mobil 1 Honda NSX	#19 Racing Project Bandoh Toyota Celica
3	Sportsland SUGO	(Japan) Daisuke Ito (Germany) Dominik Schwager	(Japan) Shigekazu Wakisaka (Japan) Takahiko Hara
NC	Sepang Circuit	#2 Castrol NISMO Nissan Skyline GT-R	#7 RE Amemiya Mazda RX-7
NC	Sepang Circuit	(Japan) Ukyo Katayama (Germany) Michael Krumm	(Japan) Tetsuya Yamano (Japan) Haruhiko Matsumoto
4	Mt. Fuji	#8 ARTA Honda NSX	#28 Team Taisan Jr Porsche 996
4	Mt. Fuji	(Japan) Keiichi Tsuchiya (Japan) Aguri Suzuki	(Japan) Shinsuke Shibahara (Japan) Hiroaki Suga
5	TI Circuit	#38 FK/Massimo Cerumo Toyota Supra	#910 Racing Porsche 996
5	TI Circuit	(Japan) Hironori Takeuchi (Japan) Yuji Tachikawa	(Japan) Hisashi Wada (Japan) Atsushi Yogo
6	Mine Circuit	#12 Calsonic Impul Nissan Skyline GT-R	#26 Advan Team Taisan Jr Porsche 996
6	Mine Circuit	(Japan) Kazuyoshi Hoshino (Japan) Satoshi Motoyama	(Japan) Hideo Fukuyama (Japan) Hideshi Matsuda
7	Suzuka Circuit	#64 Mobil 1 Honda NSX	#31 Super Autobacs A'PEX Toyota MR-S
7	Suzuka Circuit	(Japan) Daisuke Ito (Germany) Dominik Schwager	(Japan) Morio Nitta (Japan) Shinichi Takagi

== Standings ==
=== GT500 class ===
==== Drivers' standings ====
Scoring system

Position	1st	2nd	3rd	4th	5th	6th	7th	8th	9th	10th
Points	20	15	12	10	8	6	4	3	2	1

Rank	No.	Driver	MOT (Japan)	FUJ (Japan)	SUG (Japan)	SEP (Malaysia)	FUJ (Japan)	TAI (Japan)	MIN (Japan)	SUZ (Japan)	Pts.
1	16	(Japan) Ryō Michigami	2	8	2	10	10	2	4	2	74
2	1	(France) Érik Comas (Japan) Masami Kageyama	1	6	Ret	7	4	3	3	5	68
3	12	(Japan) Kazuyoshi Hoshino (Japan) Satoshi Motoyama	17	5	5	Ret	3	6	1	3	66
4	64	(Japan) Daisuke Ito (Germany) Dominik Schwager	3	7	1	3	9	16	Ret	1	58
5	38/32	(Japan) Yuji Tachikawa	4	3	12	Ret	Ret	1	6	11	48
5	38	(Japan) Hironori Takeuchi	4	3	12		Ret	1	6	11	48
6	18	(Japan) Katsutomo Kaneishi (Japan) Juichi Wakisaka	Ret	1	4	2	17	10	2	15	46
7	16	(Japan) Hidetoshi Mitsusada						2	4	2	40
8	2	(Germany) Michael Krumm	6	2	11	1	6	11	Ret	4	37
9	6	(Japan) Hideki Noda (Australia) Wayne Gardner	8	4	7	9	15	7	5	6	35
10	16	(Japan) Osamu Nakako	2	8	2	10	10				34
11	2	(Japan) Ukyo Katayama		2	11	1	6	11	Ret	4	31
12	39	(Japan) Masahiko Kageyama (Republic of Ireland) Ralph Firman	10	Ret	6	13	2	Ret	8	16	25
13	8	(Japan) Aguri Suzuki (Japan) Keiichi Tsuchiya	7	Ret	15	8	1	Ret	Ret	DSQ	24
14	35/37	(Japan) Shinichi Yamaji	12	Ret	3	11	13	9	Ret	7	18
14	35	(France) Pierre-Henri Raphanel	12	Ret	3		13	9	Ret	7	18
15	100	(Japan) Akira Iida (Japan) Naoki Hattori	Ret	14	10	6	7	5	Ret	DSQ	13
16	3	(Japan) Masahiro Hasemi (Japan) Tetsuya Tanaka	5	9	Ret	14	11	15	11	8	13
17	36	(Japan) Masanori Sekiya (Japan) Takeshi Tsuchiya	Ret	12	9	4	5	14	Ret	9	12
18	25	(Japan) Mitsuhiro Kinoshita (Japan) Manabu Orido	13	10	14	8	8	8	7	13	11
19	30	(Japan) Hideki Okada	Ret	Ret	13		12	4	Ret	Ret	10
19	30	(Japan) Tsugio Matsuda						4	Ret	Ret	10
21	37	(Japan) Seiji Ara	9	Ret	8	11	14	12	9	12	7
21	37	(Japan) Toshio Suzuki	9	Ret	8		14	12	9	12	7
22	2	(Japan) Yuji Ide	6								6
23	21	(Japan) Akihiko Nakaya	14	11	Ret		Ret	17	10	Ret	1
23	21	(Japan) Mikio Hitotsuyama	14		Ret			17	10	Ret	1
23	32	(Japan) Masahiko Kondo	11	Ret	16	Ret	19	13	Ret	10	1
23	32	(Japan) Takayuki Kinoshita	11	Ret	16		19	13	Ret	10	1
-	21	(Japan) Yasushi Hitotsuyama		11			Ret				0
-	30	(Japan) Yoji Yamada	Ret	Ret	13		12				0
-	88	(Japan) Naohiro Furuya (Japan) Tsuyoshi Takahashi	15	13	17	12	16	18	12	14	0
-	55	(Japan) Hiroaki Suga (Japan) Shinsuke Shibahara	16	Ret							0
-	55	(Japan) Eiji Yamada				Ret	18	PO			0
-	55	(Japan) Takahide Tasaki					18	PO			0
-	69/55/15	(Sri Lanka) Dilantha Malagamuwa		DNS	DNQ	WD	DNA		DNR		0
-	69	(United Kingdom) Steve Young		DNS							0
-	69/15	(Japan) Hideyuki Tamamoto			DNQ		DNA		DNR		0
-	55	(Japan) Atsushi Yogo				Ret					0
Rank		Driver	MOT (Japan)	FUJ (Japan)	SUG (Japan)	SEP (Malaysia)	FUJ (Japan)	TAI (Japan)	MIN (Japan)	SUZ (Japan)	Pts.

Colour	Result
Gold	Winner
Silver	Second place
Bronze	Third place
Green	Points classification
Blue	Non-points classification
Blue	Non-classified finish (NC)
Purple	Retired, not classified (Ret)
Red	Did not qualify (DNQ)
Red	Did not pre-qualify (DNPQ)
Black	Disqualified (DSQ)
White	Did not start (DNS)
White	Withdrew (WD)
White	Race cancelled (C)
Blank	Did not practice (DNP)
Blank	Did not arrive (DNA)
Blank	Excluded (EX)

==== Teams' standings ====
For teams that entered multiple cars, only the best result from each round counted towards the teams' championship.

Rank	Team	No.	MOT (Japan)	FUJ (Japan)	SUG (Japan)	SEP (Malaysia)	FUJ (Japan)	TAI (Japan)	MIN (Japan)	SUZ (Japan)	Pts.
1	Mugen x Dome Project	16	2	8	2	10	10	2	4	2	96
1	Mugen x Dome Project	18	Ret	1	4	2	17	10	2	15	96
2	Nismo	1	1	6	Ret	7	4	3	3	5	79
2	Nismo	2	6	2	11	1	6	11	Ret	4	79
3	Team Impul	12	17	5	5	Ret	3	6	1	3	66
4	Mobil 1 Nakajima Racing	64	3	7	1	3	9	16	Ret	1	58
5	Toyota Team Cerumo	38	4	3	12		Ret	1	6	11	48
6	Esso Ultron Toyota Team LeMans	6	8	4	7	9	15	7	5	6	35
7	Toyota Team SARD	39	10	Ret	6	13	2	Ret	8	16	25
8	Autobacs Racing Team Aguri	8	7	Ret	15	5	1	Ret	Ret	DSQ	24
9	MatsumotoKiyoshi Team TOM'S	35	12	Ret	3		13	9	Ret	7	18
10	Toyota Castrol Team TOM'S	36	Ret	12	9	4	5	14	Ret	9	17
10	Toyota Castrol Team TOM'S	37	9	Ret	8	11	14	12	9	12	17
11	Team Kunimitsu with Mooncraft	100	Ret	14	10	6	7	5	Ret	DSQ	13
11	Hasemi Motorsports	3	5	9	Ret	14	11	15	11	8	13
13	Endless + Tsuchiya Engineering	25	13	10	14	8	8	8	7	13	11
14	Team Take One	30	Ret	Ret	13		12	4	Ret	Ret	10
15	Hitotsuyama Racing	21	14	11	Ret		Ret	17	10	Ret	1
15	cdma One Toyota Team Cerumo with Key's	32	11	Ret	16	Ret	19	13	Ret	10	1
-	JLOC	88	15	13	17	12	16	18	12	14	0
-	Team Taisan Advan	55	16	Ret		Ret	18	PO			0
-	Team Sri Lanka	15					DNS		DNR		0
-	Team Sri Lanka	69		DNS	DNQ						0
Rank	Team	No.	MOT (Japan)	FUJ (Japan)	SUG (Japan)	SEP (Malaysia)	FUJ (Japan)	TAI (Japan)	MIN (Japan)	SUZ (Japan)	Pts.

=== GT300 Drivers' championship ===
Rank	No.	Driver	MOT (Japan)	FUJ (Japan)	SUG (Japan)	SEP (Malaysia)	FUJ (Japan)	TAI (Japan)	MIN (Japan)	SUZ (Japan)	Pts.
1	26	(Japan) Hideo Fukuyama	1	1	9	5	7	7	1	2	85
2	26	(Japan) Hideshi Matsuda	1	1	WD		7	7	1	2	83
3	910	(Japan) Atsushi Yogo (Japan) Hisashi Wada	4	2	Ret		4	1	2	4	80
4	81	(Japan) Nobuyuki Ohyagi (Japan) Takayuki Aoki	5	3	Ret		2	2	5	6	64
5	7	(Japan) Tetsuya Yamano (Japan) Haruhiko Matsumoto	2	5	Ret	1	3	Ret	4	3	57
6	19	(Japan) Shigekazu Wakisaka (Japan) Takahiro Hara	3	Ret	1	2	Ret	3	14	17	44
7	31	(Japan) Morio Nitta	6	10	6	3	6	Ret	13	1	39
8	28	(Japan) Hiroaki Suga (Japan) Shinsuke Shibahara			10		1	8	3	Ret	36
9	77	(Japan) Katsuo Kobayashi (Japan) Tatsuya Tanigawa	DNA	4	3	4	5	Ret	6	Ret	36
10	10/11	(Japan) Yasutaka Hinoi	7	7	2		Ret	5	Ret	8	34
11	71	(Japan) Masaki Jyonai	DNA	12	4		Ret	4	7	5	32
12	72/31	(Japan) Shinichi Takagi		DNA		3	6	Ret	13	1	26
13	10	(Japan) Yutaka Yamagishi	7	7	2		Ret				23
14	71	(Japan) Masanobu Takenaka						4	7	5	22
15	24	(Japan) Kazuyuki Nishizawa (Italy) Marco Apicella	11	Ret	5		13	13	8	9	13
16	31	(Japan) Yudai Igarashi	6	10	6						13
17	20	(Japan) Masahiro Matsunaga (Japan) Kumi Sato					Ret	6	9	7	12
18	11	(Japan) Kengo Kitaura	DNS	DNS			14	5		8	11
19	70	(Japan) Yoshimi Ishibashi	8	9	7	6	10	10	12	16	11
20	71	(Japan) Naohiro Kawano	DNA	12	4		Ret				10
21	86	(Japan) Minoru Tanaka (Japan) Koji Matsuda	DNA	6	DNS		12	9	13	Ret	8
22	51	(Japan) Seiichi Sodeyama		Ret	8		8	15	11	11	6
23	70	(Belgium) Patrick van Schoote	8	9		6	10				6
24	70	(Japan) Nobuo Komiya			7			10	12	16	5
25	911	(Japan) Jukuchou Sunako	Ret	8	Ret		9			12	5
26	51/55	(Japan) Eiji Yamada		Ret	8				10	15	4
27	51	(Japan) Naofumi Omoto					8	15	11	11	3
28	111	(Japan) Junichi Ikura (Japan) Yusei Maki	9	Ret			15	11		14	2
28	911	(Japan) Masamitsu Ishihara	Ret	8*	Ret		9			12	2
30	27/360	(Japan) Kota Sasaki (Japan) Seigo Nishizawa	10				11	12		13	1
30	55	(Japan) Takahide Tasaki							10	15	1
30	9	(Japan) Tsunefumi Hioki	NC	11			Ret	Ret		10	1
30	9	(Japan) Akira Watanabe					Ret			10	1
NC	26	(Japan) Fuminori Mizuno			9*						0
NC	9	(Japan) Yukihiro Hane		11				Ret			0
NC	11	(Japan) Hikaru Miyagi	DNS	DNS			14				0
NC	27	(Japan) Akira Hirakawa (Japan) Toshihide Hashimura						14			0
NC	9	(Japan) Shuroku Sasaki	NC								0
NC	11	(Japan) Jun Kinoshita							Ret		0
NC	101	(Japan) Hiroshi Sasaki (Japan) Mamoru Suzuki		DNS			DNQ				0
NC	26	(Sri Lanka) Dilantha Malagamuwa				5					0
NC	5	(Malaysia) Key Soon Yue (Malaysia) Ila Ridak				7					0
NC	72	(Japan) Akira Ishikawa		DNA			DNP	DNA	DNA		0
NC	72	(Japan) Keita Sawa					DNP	DNA	DNA		0
NC	888	(Japan) Takeshi Namekawa (Japan) Junichi Yamanishi								DNA	0
Rank	No.	Driver	MOT (Japan)	FUJ (Japan)	SUG (Japan)	SEP (Malaysia)	FUJ (Japan)	TAI (Japan)	MIN (Japan)	SUZ (Japan)	Pts.

==== GT300 Teams' standings ====
For teams that entered multiple cars, only the best result from each round counted towards the teams' championship.

Rank	Team	No.	MOT (Japan)	FUJ (Japan)	SUG (Japan)	SEP (Malaysia)	FUJ (Japan)	TAI (Japan)	MIN (Japan)	SUZ (Japan)	Pts.
1	Team Taisan Jr. with Advan	26	1	1	9	5	7	7	1	2	101
1	Team Taisan Jr. with Advan	28			10		1	8	3	Ret	101
2	910 Racing	910	4	2	Ret		4	1	2	4	80
2	910 Racing	911	Ret	8	Ret		9			12	80
3	Team Daishin	81	5	3	Ret		2	2	5	6	64
4	RE Amemiya Racing	7	2	5	Ret	1	3	Ret	4	3	57
5	Racing Project Bandoh	19	3	Ret	1	2	Ret	3	14	17	44
6	Super Autobacs Racing with A'PEX	31	6	10	6	3	6	Ret	13	1	39
7	Cusco Racing	77	DNA	4	3	4	5	Ret	6	Ret	36
8	Ability Motorsport	10	7	7	2		Ret				34
8	Ability Motorsport	11	DNS	Ret			14	5	Ret	8	34
9	SigmaTec Racing Team	71	DNA	12	4		Ret	4	7	5	32
10	MTCI Racing Team	24	11	Ret	5		13	13	8	9	13
11	TOM'S Spirit	20					Ret	6	9	7	12
12	Team Gaikokuya	70	8	9	7	6	10	10	12	16	11
13	KRAFT	86	DNA	6	DNS		12	9	13	Ret	8
14	Auto Staff Racing	51		Ret	8		8	15	11	11	6
15	Team Gainer	111	9	Ret			15	11		14	2
16	Team Daikokuya	9	NC	11			Ret	Ret		10	2
16	Team Daikokuya	27	10					14			2
17	Team Taisan Advan	55							10	15	1
NC	Dentaire ProJet Racing	360					11	12		13	0
NC	Team Mind	101		DNS			DNQ				0
NC	Porsche Club Malaysia	5				7					0
NC	Okura Rotary Racing	72		DNA			DNP	DNA	DNA		0
NC	Team KKD Japan With MTG	888								DNA	0
Rank	Team	No.	MOT (Japan)	FUJ (Japan)	SUG (Japan)	SEP (Malaysia)	FUJ (Japan)	TAI (Japan)	MIN (Japan)	SUZ (Japan)	Pts.
