= 2002 All Japan Grand Touring Car Championship =

Motorsports season

External image
- The Honda NSX cars of team champions Mugen x Dome Project

The 2002 All Japan Grand Touring Car Championship was the tenth season of Japan Automobile Federation GT premiere racing. It was marked as well as the twentieth season of a JAF-sanctioned sports car racing championship dating back to the All Japan Sports Prototype Championship. The GT500 class drivers' champions of 2002 were Juichi Wakisaka and Akira Iida driving the No. 6 Esso Team LeMans Toyota Supra, and the teams' champion was Honda team Mugen x Dome Project with their No. 16 Mugen NSX and No. 18 Takata Dome NSX. The GT300 class drivers' champions were the No. 31 ARTA with A'PEX Toyota MR-S driven by Morio Nitta and Shinichi Takagi.

== Drivers and teams ==
=== GT500 ===
Team	Make	Car	Engine	No.	Drivers	Tyre	Rounds
Toyota Team Cerumo	Toyota	Toyota Supra	Toyota 3S-GT 2.0 L Turbo I4	1	(Japan) Yuji Tachikawa	B	All
Toyota Team Cerumo	Toyota	Toyota Supra	Toyota 3S-GT 2.0 L Turbo I4	1	(Japan) Hironori Takeuchi	B	All
Toyota Team Cerumo	Toyota	Toyota Supra	Toyota 3S-GT 2.0 L Turbo I4	33	(Japan) Masahiko Kondo	B	1, 3–8
Toyota Team Cerumo	Toyota	Toyota Supra	Toyota 3S-GT 2.0 L Turbo I4	33	(Japan) Ukyo Katayama	B	1, 3
Toyota Team Cerumo	Toyota	Toyota Supra	Toyota 3S-GT 2.0 L Turbo I4	33	(Japan) Hayanari Shimoda	B	4–8
Esso Toyota Team LeMans	Toyota	Toyota Supra	Toyota 3S-GT 2.0 L Turbo I4	6	(Japan) Akira Iida	B	All
Esso Toyota Team LeMans	Toyota	Toyota Supra	Toyota 3S-GT 2.0 L Turbo I4	6	(Japan) Juichi Wakisaka	B	All
Autobacs Racing Team Aguri	Honda	Honda NSX	Honda C32B 3.5 L V6	8	(Japan) Katsutomo Kaneishi	B	All
Autobacs Racing Team Aguri	Honda	Honda NSX	Honda C32B 3.5 L V6	8	(Japan) Keiichi Tsuchiya	B	All
Calsonic Team Impul	Nissan	Nissan Skyline GT-R	Nissan RB26DETT 2.8 L Twin Turbo I6	12	(Japan) Tetsuya Tanaka	B	All
Calsonic Team Impul	Nissan	Nissan Skyline GT-R	Nissan RB26DETT 2.8 L Twin Turbo I6	12	(Japan) Kazuyoshi Hoshino	B	1–5
Calsonic Team Impul	Nissan	Nissan Skyline GT-R	Nissan RB26DETT 2.8 L Twin Turbo I6	12	(France) Benoît Tréluyer	B	6–8
Mugen x Dome Project	Honda	Honda NSX	Honda C32B 3.2 L V6	16	(Japan) Daisuke Ito	B	All
Mugen x Dome Project	Honda	Honda NSX	Honda C32B 3.2 L V6	16	(Germany) Dominik Schwager	B	1–4
Mugen x Dome Project	Honda	Honda NSX	Honda C32B 3.2 L V6	16	(Japan) Ryō Michigami	B	5–8
Mugen x Dome Project	Honda	Honda NSX	Honda C32B 3.2 L V6	18	(United Kingdom) Richard Lyons	B	All
Mugen x Dome Project	Honda	Honda NSX	Honda C32B 3.2 L V6	18	(France) Sébastien Philippe	B	All
Nismo	Nissan	Nissan Skyline GT-R	Nissan RB26DETT 2.8 L Twin Turbo I6 / Nissan VQ30DETT 3.0 L Twin Turbo V6	22	(Germany) Michael Krumm	B	All
Nismo	Nissan	Nissan Skyline GT-R	Nissan RB26DETT 2.8 L Twin Turbo I6 / Nissan VQ30DETT 3.0 L Twin Turbo V6	22	(Japan) Satoshi Motoyama	B	All
Nismo	Nissan	Nissan Skyline GT-R	Nissan RB26DETT 2.8 L Twin Turbo I6 / Nissan VQ30DETT 3.0 L Twin Turbo V6	23	(France) Érik Comas	B	All
Nismo	Nissan	Nissan Skyline GT-R	Nissan RB26DETT 2.8 L Twin Turbo I6 / Nissan VQ30DETT 3.0 L Twin Turbo V6	23	(Japan) Masami Kageyama	B	All
Tsuchiya Engineering	Toyota	Toyota Supra	Toyota 3S-GT 2.0 L Turbo I4	25	(Japan) Shinichi Yamaji	Y	All
Tsuchiya Engineering	Toyota	Toyota Supra	Toyota 3S-GT 2.0 L Turbo I4	25	(Japan) Seiji Ara	Y	1, 3–8
Tsuchiya Engineering	Toyota	Toyota Supra	Toyota 3S-GT 2.0 L Turbo I4	25	(United Kingdom) Geoff Lees	Y	2
Team Take One	McLaren	McLaren F1 GTR	BMW S70/2 6.0 L V12	30	(Japan) Haruki Kurosawa	D	1–3, 5–8
Team Take One	McLaren	McLaren F1 GTR	BMW S70/2 6.0 L V12	30	(Japan) Hideki Okada	D	1–3, 5–8
Project Mu Kraft	Toyota	Toyota Supra	Toyota 3S-GT 2.0 L Turbo I4	35	(Japan) Masahiko Kageyama	D	All
Project Mu Kraft	Toyota	Toyota Supra	Toyota 3S-GT 2.0 L Turbo I4	35	(Japan) Shigekazu Wakisaka	D	All
Toyota Team TOM'S	Toyota	Toyota Supra	Toyota 3S-GT 2.0 L Turbo I4	36	(Japan) Takeshi Tsuchiya	M	All
Toyota Team TOM'S	Toyota	Toyota Supra	Toyota 3S-GT 2.0 L Turbo I4	36	(Australia) Wayne Gardner	M	All
Toyota Team TOM'S	Toyota	Toyota Supra	Toyota 3S-GT 2.0 L Turbo I4	37	(Japan) Takuya Kurosawa	M	All
Toyota Team TOM'S	Toyota	Toyota Supra	Toyota 3S-GT 2.0 L Turbo I4	37	(Italy) Paolo Montin	M	1–7
Toyota Team TOM'S	Toyota	Toyota Supra	Toyota 3S-GT 2.0 L Turbo I4	37	(Japan) Hideki Noda	M	8
Denso Toyota Team SARD	Toyota	Toyota Supra	Toyota 3S-GT 2.0 L Turbo I4	39	(France) Jérémie Dufour	Y	All
Denso Toyota Team SARD	Toyota	Toyota Supra	Toyota 3S-GT 2.0 L Turbo I4	39	(Japan) Manabu Orido	Y	All
Mobil 1 Nakajima Racing	Honda	Honda NSX	Honda C32B 3.5 L V6	64	(Japan) Tsugio Matsuda	B	All
Mobil 1 Nakajima Racing	Honda	Honda NSX	Honda C32B 3.5 L V6	64	(Republic of Ireland) Ralph Firman	B	All
Hitotsuyama Racing	McLaren	McLaren F1 GTR	BMW S70/2 6.0 L V12	76	(Japan) Naoki Hattori	D	All
Hitotsuyama Racing	McLaren	McLaren F1 GTR	BMW S70/2 6.0 L V12	76	(Japan) Eiichi Tajima	D	All
HKS	Mercedes-Benz	Mercedes-Benz CLK	Mercedes-Benz M119 6.0 L V8	87	(Japan) Yudai Igarashi	M	2–3, 6–8
HKS	Mercedes-Benz	Mercedes-Benz CLK	Mercedes-Benz M119 6.0 L V8	87	(Japan) Koji Yamanishi	M	2–3, 6–8
JLOC	Lamborghini	Lamborghini Diablo JGT-1	Lamborghini L532 6.0 L V12	88	(Italy) Marco Apicella	D	All
JLOC	Lamborghini	Lamborghini Diablo JGT-1	Lamborghini L532 6.0 L V12	88	(Japan) Hisashi Wada	D	All
Raybrig Team Kunimitsu with Mooncraft	Honda	Honda NSX	Honda C32B 3.5 L V6	100	(Japan) Hidetoshi Mitsusada	B	All
Raybrig Team Kunimitsu with Mooncraft	Honda	Honda NSX	Honda C32B 3.5 L V6	100	(Japan) Hiroki Katoh	B	1, 3–8
Raybrig Team Kunimitsu with Mooncraft	Honda	Honda NSX	Honda C32B 3.5 L V6	100	(Japan) Toshihiro Kaneishi	B	2

=== GT300 ===
Team	Make	Car	Engine	No.	Drivers	Tyre	Rounds
Verno Tokai Dream28	Honda	Honda NSX	Honda C32B 3.4 L V6	2	(Japan) Kazuho Takahashi	Y	All
Verno Tokai Dream28	Honda	Honda NSX	Honda C32B 3.4 L V6	2	(Japan) Akira Watanabe	Y	All
Hasemi Motorsport	Nissan	Nissan Silvia (S15)	Nissan SR20DET 2.0 L Turbo I4	3	(Japan) Tetsuya Yamano	Y	All
Hasemi Motorsport	Nissan	Nissan Silvia (S15)	Nissan SR20DET 2.0 L Turbo I4	3	(Japan) Masataka Yanagida	Y	All
Zipspeed	Chevrolet	Chevrolet Corvette C4	Chevrolet L98 5.7 L V8	4	(Japan) Izumi Yoshida	D	All
Zipspeed	Chevrolet	Chevrolet Corvette C4	Chevrolet L98 5.7 L V8	4	(Japan) Toshiyuki Yamamoto	D	2
Zipspeed	Chevrolet	Chevrolet Corvette C4	Chevrolet L98 5.7 L V8	4	(Japan) Naohiro Furuya	D	2–3, 5–6, 8
A&S Racing	Mosler	Mosler MT900R	Chevrolet LS1 5.7 L V8	5	(Japan) Tetsuji Tamanaka	Y	All
A&S Racing	Mosler	Mosler MT900R	Chevrolet LS1 5.7 L V8	5	(Japan) "Gō Mifune"	Y	All
RE Amemiya Racing	Mazda	Mazda RX-7	Mazda RE20B 2.0 L 3-rotor	7	(Japan) Haruhiko Matsumoto	Y	All
RE Amemiya Racing	Mazda	Mazda RX-7	Mazda RE20B 2.0 L 3-rotor	7	(Japan) Nobuteru Taniguchi	Y	1–7
RE Amemiya Racing	Mazda	Mazda RX-7	Mazda RE20B 2.0 L 3-rotor	7	(Japan) Takayuki Kinoshita	Y	8
Team Daikokuya	Porsche	Porsche 911 GT3-R	Porsche M96/77 3.6 L F6	9	(Japan) Yosuke Shimoshima	Y	1–4, 8
Team Daikokuya	Porsche	Porsche 911 GT3-R	Porsche M96/77 3.6 L F6	9	(Japan) Tsunefumi Hiki	Y	1
Team Daikokuya	Porsche	Porsche 911 GT3-R	Porsche M96/77 3.6 L F6	9	(Japan) Masanobu Takenaka	Y	2–5, 8
Team Daikokuya	Porsche	Porsche 911 GT3-R	Porsche M96/77 3.6 L F6	9	(Japan) Akihiko Tsutsumi	Y	5
Amprex Motorsports	BMW	BMW M3 (E46)	BMW M52 3.2 L I6	15	(Japan) Genji Hashimoto	BF	All
Amprex Motorsports	BMW	BMW M3 (E46)	BMW M52 3.2 L I6	15	(Hong Kong) Charles Kwan	BF	All
TOM'S Spirit	Toyota	Toyota MR-S	Toyota 3S-GTE 2.0 L Turbo I4	17	(Japan) Masahiro Matsunaga	Y	1–3, 5–8
TOM'S Spirit	Toyota	Toyota MR-S	Toyota 3S-GTE 2.0 L Turbo I4	17	(Japan) Ken Namekawa	Y	1–3, 5–8
Racing Project Bandoh	Toyota	Toyota MR-S	Toyota 3S-GTE 2.0 L Turbo I4	19	(Japan) Minoru Tanaka	Y	All
Racing Project Bandoh	Toyota	Toyota MR-S	Toyota 3S-GTE 2.0 L Turbo I4	19	(Japan) Satoshi Goto	Y	All
Hitotsuyama Racing	BMW	BMW M3 CSL	BMW S50B32 3.2 L I6	21	(Japan) Yasushi Kikuchi	D	All
Hitotsuyama Racing	BMW	BMW M3 CSL	BMW S50B32 3.2 L I6	21	(Japan) Mikio Hitotsuyama	D	1, 7
Hitotsuyama Racing	BMW	BMW M3 CSL	BMW S50B32 3.2 L I6	21	(Japan) Yasushi Hitotsuyama	D	2–6, 8
Team Taisan	Porsche	Porsche 911 GT3-R	Porsche M96/77 3.6 L F6	24	(Japan) Hideo Fukuyama	Y	All
Team Taisan	Porsche	Porsche 911 GT3-R	Porsche M96/77 3.6 L F6	24	(Japan) Mitsuhiro Kinoshita	Y	All
Team Taisan	Porsche	Porsche 911 GT3-R	Porsche M96/77 3.6 L F6	26	(Japan) Atsushi Yogo	Y	All
Team Taisan	Porsche	Porsche 911 GT3-R	Porsche M96/77 3.6 L F6	26	(Japan) Kazuyushi Nishizawa	Y	All
Team Taisan	Porsche	Porsche 911 GT3-R	Porsche M96/77 3.6 L F6	28	(Japan) Yutaka Yamagishi	Y	All
Team Taisan	Porsche	Porsche 911 GT3-R	Porsche M96/77 3.6 L F6	28	(Japan) Yukihiro Hane	Y	1, 3–8
Team Taisan	Porsche	Porsche 911 GT3-R	Porsche M96/77 3.6 L F6	28	(Japan) Jukuchou Sunako	Y	2
Team Taisan	Chrysler	Chrysler Viper GTS-R	Chrysler EWB 8.0 L V10	55	(Japan) Eiji Yamada	Y	All
Team Taisan	Chrysler	Chrysler Viper GTS-R	Chrysler EWB 8.0 L V10	55	(Japan) Takashi Shimizu	Y	1–2, 5–8
Team Taisan	Chrysler	Chrysler Viper GTS-R	Chrysler EWB 8.0 L V10	55	(Japan) Takayuki Kinoshita	Y	3–4
ARTA with A'PEX	Toyota	Toyota MR-S	Toyota 3S-GTE 2.0 L Turbo I4	31	(Japan) Morio Nitta	BF	All
ARTA with A'PEX	Toyota	Toyota MR-S	Toyota 3S-GTE 2.0 L Turbo I4	31	(Japan) Shinichi Takagi	BF	All
Auto Staff Racing	Nissan	Nissan Silvia (S15)	Nissan SR20DET 2.0 L Turbo I4	51	(Japan) Naofumi Omoto	Y	3–5, 7–8
Auto Staff Racing	Nissan	Nissan Silvia (S15)	Nissan SR20DET 2.0 L Turbo I4	51	(Japan) Masanobu Kato	Y	3–5, 7
Auto Staff Racing	Nissan	Nissan Silvia (S15)	Nissan SR20DET 2.0 L Turbo I4	51	(Japan) Akira Ishikawa	Y	8
R&D Sport	Porsche	Porsche 911 GT3-R	Porsche M96/77 3.6 L F6	61	(Japan) Yasuo Miyagawa	D	1–5
R&D Sport	Porsche	Porsche 911 GT3-R	Porsche M96/77 3.6 L F6	61	(Japan) Hiroaki Suga	D	1, 3
R&D Sport	Porsche	Porsche 911 GT3-R	Porsche M96/77 3.6 L F6	61	(Japan) Tsubasa Kurosawa	D	2
R&D Sport	Porsche	Porsche 911 GT3-R	Porsche M96/77 3.6 L F6	61	(Japan) Atsushi Katsumasa	D	4–5
R&D Sport	Porsche	Porsche 911 GT3-R	Porsche M96/77 3.6 L F6	62		D	
R&D Sport	Porsche	Porsche 911 GT3-R	Porsche M96/77 3.6 L F6	62	(Japan) Shinsuke Shibahara	D	1
R&D Sport	Porsche	Porsche 911 GT3-R	Porsche M96/77 3.6 L F6	62	(Japan) Shogo Mitsuyama	D	1
R&D Sport	Vemac	Vemac RD320R	Honda C32B 3.4 L V6	62		D	
R&D Sport	Vemac	Vemac RD320R	Honda C32B 3.4 L V6	62	(Japan) Shinsuke Shibahara	D	2–8
R&D Sport	Vemac	Vemac RD320R	Honda C32B 3.4 L V6	62	(Japan) Shogo Mitsuyama	D	2–8
R&D Sport	Porsche	Porsche 911 GT3-R	Porsche M96/77 3.6 L F6	63	(Japan) "OSAMU"	D	All
R&D Sport	Porsche	Porsche 911 GT3-R	Porsche M96/77 3.6 L F6	63	(Japan) Takamasa Nakagawa	D	All
Team Revolution	Mazda	Mazda RX-7	Mazda RE20B 2.0 L 3-rotor	66	(Japan) Tetsuya Shimizu	Y	5, 6, 8
Team Revolution	Mazda	Mazda RX-7	Mazda RE20B 2.0 L 3-rotor	66	(Japan) Shinji Abe	Y	5
Team Revolution	Mazda	Mazda RX-7	Mazda RE20B 2.0 L 3-rotor	66	(Japan) Mutsumi Shiono	Y	6, 8
Team Gaikokuya	Porsche	Porsche 996 GT3-RS	Porsche M96/77 3.6 L F6	70	(Japan) Yoshimi Ishibashi	D	All
Team Gaikokuya	Porsche	Porsche 996 GT3-RS	Porsche M96/77 3.6 L F6	70	(Belgium) Patrick van Schoote	D	1–5
Team Gaikokuya	Porsche	Porsche 996 GT3-RS	Porsche M96/77 3.6 L F6	70	(Japan) Seiichi Sodeyama	D	6
Team Gaikokuya	Porsche	Porsche 996 GT3-RS	Porsche M96/77 3.6 L F6	70	(Japan) Nobuo Komiya	D	7–8
SigmaTec Racing Team	Toyota	Toyota MR-S	Toyota 3S-GTE 2.0 L Turbo I4	71	(Japan) Keita Sawa	D	All
SigmaTec Racing Team	Toyota	Toyota MR-S	Toyota 3S-GTE 2.0 L Turbo I4	71	(Japan) Guts Jyonai	D	All
Cusco Racing	Subaru	Subaru Impreza WRX STI	Subaru EJ20 2.0 L Turbo F4	77	(Japan) Katsuo Kobayashi	Y	All
Cusco Racing	Subaru	Subaru Impreza WRX STI	Subaru EJ20 2.0 L Turbo F4	77	(Japan) Tatsuya Tanigawa	Y	All
Team Daishin	Nissan	Nissan Silvia (S15)	Nissan SR20DET 2.0 L Turbo I4	81	(Japan) Nobuyuki Ohyagi	Y	All
Team Daishin	Nissan	Nissan Silvia (S15)	Nissan SR20DET 2.0 L Turbo I4	81	(Japan) Takayuki Aoki	Y	All
KRAFT	Toyota	Toyota MR-S	Toyota 3S-GTE 2.0 L Turbo I4	86	(Japan) Masaoki Nagashima	D	All
KRAFT	Toyota	Toyota MR-S	Toyota 3S-GTE 2.0 L Turbo I4	86	(Japan) Koji Matsuda	D	All
Dentaire ProJet Racing	Ferrari	Ferrari 360	Ferrari F131B 3.6 L V8	360	(Japan) Seigo Nishizawa	Y	1–3, 5, 7–8
Dentaire ProJet Racing	Ferrari	Ferrari 360	Ferrari F131B 3.6 L V8	360	(Japan) Kota Sasaki	Y	1–3, 5, 7–8
910 Racing	Porsche	Porsche 996 GT3 RS	Porsche M96/77 3.6 L F6	910	(Japan) Hideshi Matsuda	Y	All
910 Racing	Porsche	Porsche 996 GT3 RS	Porsche M96/77 3.6 L F6	910	(Japan) Yasuo Miyagawa	Y	1
910 Racing	Porsche	Porsche 996 GT3 RS	Porsche M96/77 3.6 L F6	910	(United Kingdom) Adam Wilcox	Y	2–8
910 Racing	Porsche	Porsche 996 GT3 RS	Porsche M96/77 3.6 L F6	911	(Japan) Akira Hirakawa	Y	All
910 Racing	Porsche	Porsche 996 GT3 RS	Porsche M96/77 3.6 L F6	911	(Japan) Toshihide Hashimura	Y	1
910 Racing	Porsche	Porsche 996 GT3 RS	Porsche M96/77 3.6 L F6	911	(Japan) Shigemitsu Haga	Y	2–3, 6, 8
910 Racing	Porsche	Porsche 996 GT3 RS	Porsche M96/77 3.6 L F6	911	(Japan) Jukuchou Sunako	Y	5, 7

== Schedule ==
Round	Race	Circuit	Date
1	GT Championship in TI	(Japan) TI Circuit	April 14
2	All Japan Fuji GT Race	(Japan) Fuji Speedway	May 4
3	SUGO GT Championship	(Japan) Sportsland SUGO	May 26
4	Tmtouch Japan GT Championship Malaysia	(Malaysia) Sepang Circuit	June 23
5	Japan Special GT Cup	(Japan) Fuji Speedway	July 28
6	Motegi GT Championship Race	(Japan) Twin Ring Motegi	September 15
7	CP Mine GT Race	(Japan) Mine Circuit	October 27
8	Suzuka GT 300 km	(Japan) Suzuka Circuit	November 17

== Season results ==
Round	Circuit	GT500 Winning Team	GT300 Winning Team
Round	Circuit	GT500 Winning Drivers	GT300 Winning Drivers
1	TI Circuit	#64 Mobil 1 Honda NSX	#31 ARTA A'PEX Toyota MR-S
1	TI Circuit	(Japan) Tsugio Matsuda (Republic of Ireland) Ralph Firman	(Japan) Morio Nitta (Japan) Shinichi Takagi
2	Mt. Fuji	#1 au Cerumo Toyota Supra	#62 R&D Sport Vemac RD320R
2	Mt. Fuji	(Japan) Yuji Tachikawa (Japan) Hironori Takeuchi	(Japan) Shogo Mitsuyama (Japan) Shinsuke Shibahara
3	Sportsland SUGO	#6 ESSO Team LeMans Toyota Supra	#3 Hasemi Motorsports Nissan Silvia
3	Sportsland SUGO	(Japan) Juichi Wakisaka (Japan) Akira Iida	(Japan) Masataka Yanagida (Japan) Tetsuya Yamano
4	Sepang Circuit	#64 Mobil 1 Honda NSX	#7 RE Amemiya Mazda RX-7
4	Sepang Circuit	(Japan) Tsugio Matsuda (Republic of Ireland) Ralph Firman	(Japan) Haruhiko Matsumoto (Japan) Nobuteru Taniguchi
5	Mt. Fuji	#1 au Cerumo Toyota Supra	#24 Advan Team Taisan Porsche 996
5	Mt. Fuji	(Japan) Yuji Tachikawa (Japan) Hironori Takeuchi	(Japan) Hideo Fukuyama (Japan) Mitsuhiro Kinoshita
6	Twin Ring Motegi	#18 Takata Dome Honda NSX	#62 R&D Sport Vemac RD320R
6	Twin Ring Motegi	(France) Sebastien Philippe (United Kingdom) Richard Lyons	(Japan) Shogo Mitsuyama (Japan) Shinsuke Shibahara
7	Mine Circuit	#16 Mugen Honda NSX	#62 R&D Sport Vemac RD320R
7	Mine Circuit	(Japan) Ryō Michigami (Japan) Daisuke Ito	(Japan) Shogo Mitsuyama (Japan) Shinsuke Shibahara
8	Suzuka Circuit	#64 Mobil 1 Honda NSX	#81 Team Daishin Nissan Silvia
8	Suzuka Circuit	(Japan) Tsugio Matsuda (Republic of Ireland) Ralph Firman	(Japan) Takayuki Aoki (Japan) Noboyuki Oyagi

== Standings ==
=== GT500 class ===
==== Drivers' standings ====
Scoring system

Position	1st	2nd	3rd	4th	5th	6th	7th	8th	9th	10th
Points	20	15	12	10	8	6	4	3	2	1
Qualifying	1	1	1							
Fastest lap	1	1	1							

Rank	No.	Driver	TAI (Japan)	FUJ (Japan)	SUG (Japan)	SEP (Malaysia)	FUJ (Japan)	MOT (Japan)	MIN (Japan)	SUZ (Japan)	Pts.
1	6	(Japan) Akira Iida (Japan) Juichi Wakisaka	10	2	1	11	7	4	4	3	75
2	64	(Japan) Tsugio Matsuda (Republic of Ireland) Ralph Firman	1	11	Ret	1	12	14	6	1	74
3	1	(Japan) Hironori Takeuchi (Japan) Yuji Tachikawa	4	1	16	9	1	13	9	6	65
4	100	(Japan) Hidetoshi Mitsusada	9	5	2	5	8	2	Ret	4	63
5	16	(Japan) Daisuke Ito	5	3	3	10	11	16	1	10	59
6	100	(Japan) Hiroki Katoh	9		2	5	8	2	Ret	4	55
7	36	(Japan) Takeshi Tsuchiya (Australia) Wayne Gardner	8	14	10	2	5	6	3	9	52
8	22	(Japan) Satoshi Motoyama (Germany) Michael Krumm	11	7	7	4	2	10	2	Ret	51
9	18	(United Kingdom) Richard Lyons (France) Sébastien Philippe	2	15	16	13	6	1	12	14	47
10	8	(Japan) Katsutomo Kaneishi (Japan) Keiichi Tsuchiya	7	4	13	6	9	8	8	2	29
11	37	(Japan) Takuya Kurosawa	Ret	12	5	3	3	7	Ret	16	38
12	37	(Italy) Paolo Montin	Ret	12	5	3	3	7	Ret		38
13	16	(Germany) Dominik Schwager	5	3	3	10					35
14	39	(France) Jérémie Dufour (Japan) Manabu Orido	3	Ret	12	DSQ	15	5	7	5	33
15	25	(Japan) Shinichi Yamaji	6	13	11	Ret	4	9	5	7	32
16	25	(Japan) Seiji Ara	6		11	Ret	4	9	5	7	32
17	76	(Japan) Naoki Hattori (Japan) Eiichi Tajima	13	8	6	8	13	3	Ret	Ret	27
18	16	(Japan) Ryō Michigami					11	16	1	10	24
19	23	(France) Érik Comas (Japan) Masami Kageyama	12	6	4	16	14	17	Ret	8	19
20	100	(Japan) Toshihiro Kaneishi		5							8
21	33	(Japan) Masahiko Kondo	15		9	7	16	12	11	13	6
22	33	(Japan) Hayanari Shimoda				7	16	12	11	13	4
23	12	(Japan) Tetsuya Tanaka	14	Ret	8	14	Ret	11	13	17	4
24	12	(Japan) Kazuyoshi Hoshino	14	Ret	8	14	Ret				3
25	35	(Japan) Masahiko Kageyama (Japan) Shigekazu Wakisaka	17	10	Ret	12	10	15	10	12	3
26	30	(Japan) Haruki Kurosawa (Japan) Hideki Okada	16	9	14		Ret	Ret	Ret	11	2
27	33	(Japan) Ukyo Katayama	15		9						2
28	12	(France) Benoît Tréluyer						11	13	17	1
-	25	(United Kingdom) Geoff Lees		13							0
-	88	(Italy) Marco Apicella (Japan) Hisashi Wada	DNQ	Ret	15	Ret	Ret	18	Ret	Ret	0
-	37	(Japan) Hideki Noda								16	0
-	87	(Japan) Yudai Igarashi (Japan) Koji Yamanishi		DNQ	DNQ			Ret	Ret	Ret	0
Rank		Driver	TAI (Japan)	FUJ (Japan)	SUG (Japan)	SEP (Malaysia)	FUJ (Japan)	MOT (Japan)	MIN (Japan)	SUZ (Japan)	Pts.

Colour	Result
Gold	Winner
Silver	Second place
Bronze	Third place
Green	Points classification
Blue	Non-points classification
Blue	Non-classified finish (NC)
Purple	Retired, not classified (Ret)
Red	Did not qualify (DNQ)
Red	Did not pre-qualify (DNPQ)
Black	Disqualified (DSQ)
White	Did not start (DNS)
White	Withdrew (WD)
White	Race cancelled (C)
Blank	Did not practice (DNP)
Blank	Did not arrive (DNA)
Blank	Excluded (EX)

==== Teams' standings ====
For teams that entered multiple cars, only the best result from each round counted towards the teams' championship.

Rank	Team	No.	TAI (Japan)	FUJ (Japan)	SUG (Japan)	SEP (Malaysia)	FUJ (Japan)	MOT (Japan)	MIN (Japan)	SUZ (Japan)	Pts.
1	Mugen x Dome Project	16	5	3	3	10	11	16	1	10	96
1	Mugen x Dome Project	18	2	15	16	13	6	1	12	14	96
2	Esso Toyota Team LeMans	6	10	2	1	11	7	4	4	3	75
3	Mobil 1 Nakajima Racing	64	1	11	Ret	1	12	14	6	1	74
4	Toyota Team Cerumo	33	15		9	7	16	12	11	13	69
4	Toyota Team Cerumo	1	4	1	17	9	1	13	9	6	69
5	Toyota Team TOM'S	36	8	14	10	2	5	6	3	9	65
5	Toyota Team TOM'S	37	Ret	12	5	3	3	7	Ret	16	65
6	Team Kunimitsu with Mooncraft	100	9	5	2	5	8	2	Ret	4	63
7	Nismo	22	11	7	7	4	2	10	2	Ret	62
7	Nismo	23	12	6	4	15	14	17	Ret	8	62
8	Autobacs Racing Team Aguri	8	7	4	13	6	9	8	8	2	46
9	Toyota Team SARD	39	3	Ret	12	DSQ	15	5	7	5	33
10	Tsuchiya Engineering	25	6	13	11	Ret	4	9	5	7	32
11	Hitotsuyama Racing	76	13	8	6	8	13	3	Ret	Ret	27
12	Team Impul	12	14	Ret	8	14	Ret	11	13	17	4
13	Kraft	35	17	10	Ret	12	10	15	10	12	3
14	Team Take One	30	16	9	14		Ret	Ret	Ret	11	2
-	JLOC	88	DNQ	Ret	15	Ret	Ret	18	Ret	Ret	0
-	HKS	87		DNQ	DNQ			Ret	Ret	15	0
Rank	Team	No.	TAI (Japan)	FUJ (Japan)	SUG (Japan)	SEP (Malaysia)	FUJ (Japan)	MOT (Japan)	MIN (Japan)	SUZ (Japan)	Pts.

=== GT300 Drivers' championship ===
Rank	No.	Driver	TAI (Japan)	FUJ (Japan)	SUG (Japan)	SEP (Malaysia)	FUJ (Japan)	MOT (Japan)	MIN (Japan)	SUZ (Japan)	Pts.
1	31	(Japan) Morio Nitta (Japan) Shinichi Takagi	1	Ret	17	2	4	5	4	4	75
2	62	(Japan) Shinsuke Shibahara (Japan) Shogo Mitsuyama	Ret	1	15	Ret	13	1	1	7	73
3	3	(Japan) Tetsuya Yamano (Japan) Masataka Yanagida	4	Ret	1	3	3	4	Ret	Ret	70
4	24	(Japan) Hideo Fukuyama (Japan) Mitsuhiro Kinoshita	2	Ret	16	5	1	7	Ret	2	65
5	81	(Japan) Nobuyuki Ohyagi (Japan) Takayuki Aoki	3	Ret	12	7	2	Ret	12	1	56
6	910	(Japan) Hideshi Matsuda (United Kingdom) Adam Wilcox	8	4	Ret	4	6	8	2	5	55
7	26	(Japan) Kazuyushi Nishizawa	5	3	7	10	7	3	3	17	54
8	77	(Japan) Katsuo Kobayashi (Japan) Tatsuya Tanigawa	7	6	2	16	5	2	7	Ret	53
9	26	(Japan) Atsushi Yogo	5		7	10	7	3	3	17	42
10	7	(Japan) Haruhiko Matsumoto	6	12	Ret	1	12	Ret	Ret	3	41
11	26/55/7	(Japan) Takayuki Kinoshita		3	5	9				3	34
12	19	(Japan) Satoshi Goto (Japan) Minoru Tanaka	18	5	Ret	6	22	6	6	12	31
13	7	(Japan) Nobuteru Taniguchi	6	12	Ret	1	12	Ret	Ret		29
14	55	(Japan) Eiji Yamada	10	16	5	9	8	9	4	21	26
15	71	(Japan) Guts Jyonai (Japan) Keita Sawa	14	2	Ret		Ret	10	13	6	24
16	2	(Japan) Kazuho Takahashi (Japan) Akira Watanabe	9	14	4	8	10	Ret	Ret	9	22
17	55	(Japan) Takashi Shimizu	10	16			8	9	4	21	16
18	63	(Japan) "OSAMU" (Japan) Takamasa Nakagawa	17	Ret	3	15	17	13	10	DNS	13
18	28	(Japan) Yutaka Yamagishi	11	7	6	11	11	17	Ret	8	13
20	28	(Japan) Yukihiro Hane	11		6	11	11	17	Ret	8	9
21	28/911	(Japan) Jukuchou Sunako		7			14		8		7
22	21	(Japan) Yasushi Kikuchi	16	8	8	19	20	14	Ret	Ret	6
22	21	(Japan) Yasushi Hitotsuyama		8	8	19	20			Ret	6
22	911	(Japan) Akira Hirakawa	15	DSQ	9		14	12	8	10	6
22	5	(Japan) Tetsuji Tamanaka (Japan) "Gō Mifune"	Ret	9	18	18	24	16	Ret	13	6
26	70	(Japan) Yoshimi Ishibashi	Ret	15	10	Ret	16	15	9	20	3
26	911	(Japan) Shigemitsu Haga		DSQ	9			12		10	3
28	15	(Japan) Genji Hashimoto (Hong Kong) Charles Kwan	15	19	Ret	12	9	11	Ret	16	2
28	70	(Japan) Nobuo Komiya							9	20	2
30	61	(Japan) Yasuo Miyagawa	20	10	DNA	17	21				1
30	61	(Japan) Tsubasa Kurosawa		10							1
30	70	(Belgium) Patrick van Schoote	Ret	15	10	Ret	16	15			1
30	86	(Japan) Masaoki Nagashima (Japan) Koji Matsuda	19	17	11	13	18	Ret	Ret	19	1
-	17	(Japan) Masahiro Matsunaga	12	11	14		23		Ret	11	0
-	17	(Japan) Ken Namekawa	12	11	14		23		Ret		0
-	51	(Japan) Naofumi Omoto			13		Ret		11	14	0
-	51	(Japan) Takeshi Shirai							11		0
-	17	(Japan) Takahiro Fujita								11	0
-	360	(Japan) Seigo Nishizawa (Japan) Kota Sasaki	13	13			DNA		Ret	15	0
-	51	(Japan) Masanobu Kato			13		Ret				0
-	9	(Japan) Masanobu Takenaka		18		14	15			18	0
-	9	(Japan) Yosuke Shimoshima	DNQ	18		14				18	0
-	21	(Japan) Mikio Hitotsuyama	16					14	Ret		0
-	51	(Japan) Akira Ishikawa								14	0
-	911	(Japan) Toshihide Hashimura	15								0
-	9	(Japan) Akihiko Tsutsumi					15				0
-	70	(Japan) Seiichi Sodeyama						15			0
-	61	(Japan) Atsushi Katsumasa				17	21				0
-	66	(Japan) Tetsuya Shimizu					19	Ret		Ret	0
-	66	(Japan) Shinji Abe					19				0
-	61	(Japan) Hiroaki Suga	20		DNA						0
-	66	(Japan) Mutsumi Shiono						Ret		Ret	0
-	4	(Japan) Izumi Yoshida		DNQ	DNQ		DNS	DNQ		DNQ	0
-	4	(Japan) Naohiro Furuya			DNQ		DNS	DNQ		DNQ	0
-	9	(Japan) Tsunefumi Hioki	DNQ								0
-	4	(Japan) Toshiyuki Yamamoto		DNQ							0
Rank	No.	Driver	TAI (Japan)	FUJ (Japan)	SUG (Japan)	SEP (Malaysia)	FUJ (Japan)	MOT (Japan)	MIN (Japan)	SUZ (Japan)	Pts.

==== GT300 Teams' standings ====
For teams that entered multiple cars, only the best result from each round counted towards the teams' championship.

Rank	Team	No.	TAI (Japan)	FUJ (Japan)	SUG (Japan)	SEP (Malaysia)	FUJ (Japan)	MOT (Japan)	MIN (Japan)	SUZ (Japan)	Pts.
1	Team Taisan with Advan	24	2	Ret	16	5	1	7	Ret	2	102
1	Team Taisan with Advan	26	5	3	7	10	7	3	3	17	102
2	R&D Sport	62	Ret	1	15	Ret	13	1	1	7	85
2	R&D Sport	63	17	Ret	3	15	17	13	10	DNS	85
3	ARTA with A'PEX	31	1	Ret	17	2	4	5	4	4	75
4	Hasemi Motorsport	3	4	Ret	1	3	3	4	Ret	Ret	70
5	910 Racing	910	8	4	Ret	4	6	8	2	5	57
5	910 Racing	911	15	DSQ	9		14	12	8	10	57
6	Team Daishin	81	3	Ret	12	7	2	Ret	12	1	56
7	Cusco Racing	77	7	6	2	16	5	2	7	Ret	53
8	RE Amemiya Racing	7	6	12	Ret	1	12	Ret	Ret	3	41
9	Team Taisan Advan jr.	28	11	7	6	11	11	17	Ret	8	33
9	Team Taisan Advan jr.	55	10	16	5	9	8	9	4	21	33
10	Racing Project Bandoh	19	18	5	Ret	6	22	6	6	12	31
11	Sigma Tech Racing Team	71	14	2	Ret		Ret	10	13	6	24
12	Verno Tokai Dream28	2	9	14	4	8	10	Ret	Ret	9	22
13	Hitotsuyama Racing	21	16	8	8	19	20	14	Ret	Ret	6
14	A&S Racing	5	Ret	9	18	18	24	16	Ret	13	6
15	Team Gaikokuya	70	Ret	15	10	Ret	16	15	9	20	3
16	Amprex Motorsports	15	15	19	Ret	12	9	11	Ret	16	2
17	R&D Sport Ex	61	20	10	DNA	17	21				1
18	KRAFT	86	19	17	11	13	18	Ret	Ret	19	1
-	TOM'S Spirit	17	12	11	14		23		Ret	11	0
-	Auto Staff Racing	51			13		Ret		11	14	0
-	Team Daikokuya	9	DNQ	18		14	15			18	0
-	Dentaire ProJet Racing	360	13	13			DNA		Ret	15	0
-	Team Revolution	66					19	Ret		Ret	0
-	Zipspeed	4		DNQ	DNQ		DNS	DNQ		DNQ	0
Rank	Team	No.	TAI (Japan)	FUJ (Japan)	SUG (Japan)	SEP (Malaysia)	FUJ (Japan)	MOT (Japan)	MIN (Japan)	SUZ (Japan)	Pts.
