= 1999 All Japan Grand Touring Car Championship =

Sports car racing season

The 1999 All Japan Grand Touring Car Championship was the seventh season of Japan Automobile Federation GT premiere racing. It was marked as well as the seventeenth season of a JAF-sanctioned sports car racing championship dating back to the All Japan Sports Prototype Championship. The GT500 class champion of that season was the Pennzoil Nismo GT-R driven by Érik Comas and Satoshi Motoyama and the GT300 class champion was the MOMOCORSE A'PEX MR2 driven by Morio Nitta and Shinichi Takagi. Both Comas and Nitta won their respective driver's title on their own since Motoyama and Takagi missed a round each; Motoyama skipped the second round at Fuji because he was participating in the pre-qualifying session of that year's 24 Hours of Le Mans while Takagi missed the first round at Suzuka because he was in the United States on a bid to find a seat in Indy Lights.

The season was marred by the death of reigning GT300 Champion, Shingo Tachi, in a pre-season testing crash at TI Circuit Aida on March 11, 1999. Tachi was to drive the number 6 Esso Toyota Supra for Toyota Team LeMans. Kunimitsu Takahashi retired from his racing career at the end of the season at aged 59.

== Drivers and teams ==
=== GT500 ===
Team	Make	Car	Engine	No.	Drivers	Tyre	Rounds
Pennzoil Nismo GT-R	Nissan	Nissan Skyline GT-R (R34)	Nissan RB26DETT 2.7 L Twin Turbo I6	1	(France) Érik Comas	B	All
Pennzoil Nismo GT-R	Nissan	Nissan Skyline GT-R (R34)	Nissan RB26DETT 2.7 L Twin Turbo I6	1	(Japan) Satoshi Motoyama	B	1, 3–7, NC
Pennzoil Nismo GT-R	Nissan	Nissan Skyline GT-R (R34)	Nissan RB26DETT 2.7 L Twin Turbo I6	1	(Sweden) Anders Olofsson	B	2
ARTA Zexel Skyline/Nismo	Nissan	Nissan Skyline GT-R (R34)	Nissan RB26DETT 2.7 L Twin Turbo I6	2	(Japan) Aguri Suzuki	B	All
ARTA Zexel Skyline/Nismo	Nissan	Nissan Skyline GT-R (R34)	Nissan RB26DETT 2.7 L Twin Turbo I6	2	(Germany) Michael Krumm	B	1, 3–7, NC
ARTA Zexel Skyline/Nismo	Nissan	Nissan Skyline GT-R (R34)	Nissan RB26DETT 2.7 L Twin Turbo I6	2	(Germany) Armin Hahne	B	2
Hasemi Motorsport	Nissan	Nissan Skyline GT-R (R33)	Nissan RB26DETT 2.7 L Twin Turbo I6	3	(Japan) Masahiro Hasemi	B	All
Hasemi Motorsport	Nissan	Nissan Skyline GT-R (R33)	Nissan RB26DETT 2.7 L Twin Turbo I6	3	(Japan) Tetsuya Tanaka	B	All
Esso Toyota Team LeMans	Toyota	Toyota Supra	Toyota 3S-GT 2.0 L Turbo I4	6	(Australia) Wayne Gardner	B	2–7, NC
Esso Toyota Team LeMans	Toyota	Toyota Supra	Toyota 3S-GT 2.0 L Turbo I4	6	(Japan) Hideki Noda	B	2–7, NC
Endless Sports	Nissan	Nissan Skyline GT-R (R33)	Nissan RB26DETT 2.7 L Twin Turbo I6	11	(Japan) Takao Wada	B	1–3, 5
Endless Sports	Nissan	Nissan Skyline GT-R (R33)	Nissan RB26DETT 2.7 L Twin Turbo I6	11	(Japan) Mitsuhiro Kinoshita	B	1–3, 5
Calsonic Team Impul	Nissan	Nissan Skyline GT-R (R34)	Nissan RB26DETT 2.7 L Twin Turbo I6	12	(Japan) Kazuyoshi Hoshino	B	All
Calsonic Team Impul	Nissan	Nissan Skyline GT-R (R34)	Nissan RB26DETT 2.7 L Twin Turbo I6	12	(Japan) Masami Kageyama	B	All
Castrol Mugen NSX/Mugen x Dome Project	Honda	Honda NSX	Honda C32B 3.5 L V6	16	(Japan) Ryō Michigami	B	All
Castrol Mugen NSX/Mugen x Dome Project	Honda	Honda NSX	Honda C32B 3.5 L V6	16	(Japan) Osamu Nakako	B	All
Takata Dome NSX/Mugen x Dome Project	Honda	Honda NSX	Honda C32B 3.5 L V6	18	(Japan) Katsutomo Kaneishi	B	All
Takata Dome NSX/Mugen x Dome Project	Honda	Honda NSX	Honda C32B 3.5 L V6	18	(Japan) Juichi Wakisaka	B	All
Team Take One	McLaren	McLaren F1 GTR	BMW S70/2 6.0 L V12	30	(Japan) Hideki Okada	B	All
Team Take One	McLaren	McLaren F1 GTR	BMW S70/2 6.0 L V12	30	(Japan) Yoji Yamada	B	All
Toyota Team Cerumo	Toyota	Toyota Supra	Toyota 3S-GT 2.0 L Turbo I4	32	(Japan) Masahiko Kondo	B	All
Toyota Team Cerumo	Toyota	Toyota Supra	Toyota 3S-GT 2.0 L Turbo I4	32	(Japan) Takayuki Kinoshita	B	All
Toyota Team Cerumo	Toyota	Toyota Supra	Toyota 3S-GT 2.0 L Turbo I4	38	(Japan) Yuji Tachikawa	B	All
Toyota Team Cerumo	Toyota	Toyota Supra	Toyota 3S-GT 2.0 L Turbo I4	38	(Japan) Hironori Takeuchi	B	All
Toyota Team TOM'S	Toyota	Toyota Supra	Toyota 3S-GT 2.0 L Turbo I4	35	(Japan) Shinichi Yamaji	M	All
Toyota Team TOM'S	Toyota	Toyota Supra	Toyota 3S-GT 2.0 L Turbo I4	35	(France) Pierre-Henri Raphanel	M	All
Toyota Team TOM'S	Toyota	Toyota Supra	Toyota 3S-GT 2.0 L Turbo I4	36	(Japan) Masanori Sekiya	M	All
Toyota Team TOM'S	Toyota	Toyota Supra	Toyota 3S-GT 2.0 L Turbo I4	36	(Japan) Takuya Kurosawa	M	All
Toyota Team TOM'S	Toyota	Toyota Supra	Toyota 3S-GT 2.0 L Turbo I4	37	(Japan) Toshio Suzuki	M	All
Toyota Team TOM'S	Toyota	Toyota Supra	Toyota 3S-GT 2.0 L Turbo I4	37	(Japan) Ukyo Katayama	M	1, 3–7, NC
Toyota Team TOM'S	Toyota	Toyota Supra	Toyota 3S-GT 2.0 L Turbo I4	37	(United Kingdom) Darren Manning	M	2
Denso Toyota Team SARD	Toyota	Toyota Supra	Toyota 3S-GT 2.0 L Turbo I4	39	(Japan) Keiichi Tsuchiya	Y	All
Denso Toyota Team SARD	Toyota	Toyota Supra	Toyota 3S-GT 2.0 L Turbo I4	39	(Japan) Masahiko Kageyama	Y	All
Team Taisan Advan	Dodge	Dodge Viper GTS-R	Dodge EWB 8.0 L V10	55	(Japan) Eiichi Tajima	Y	1–2, 4, NC
Team Taisan Advan	Dodge	Dodge Viper GTS-R	Dodge EWB 8.0 L V10	55	(Japan) Hideshi Matsuda	Y	1–2, 4
Team Taisan Advan	Dodge	Dodge Viper GTS-R	Dodge EWB 8.0 L V10	55	(Germany) Dominik Schwager	Y	3
Team Taisan Advan	Dodge	Dodge Viper GTS-R	Dodge EWB 8.0 L V10	55	(Japan) Yasuyuki Honjo	Y	NC
Mobil 1 Nakajima Racing	Honda	Honda NSX	Honda C32B 3.5 L V6	64	(Netherlands) Tom Coronel	B	All
Mobil 1 Nakajima Racing	Honda	Honda NSX	Honda C32B 3.5 L V6	64	(Japan) Koji Yamanishi	B	1–4
Mobil 1 Nakajima Racing	Honda	Honda NSX	Honda C32B 3.5 L V6	64	(Japan) Hidetoshi Mitsusada	B	5–7, NC
JLOC	Lamborghini	Lamborghini Diablo GT-1	Lamborghini L532 6.0 L V12	88	(Japan) Naohiro Furuya	T	All
JLOC	Lamborghini	Lamborghini Diablo GT-1	Lamborghini L532 6.0 L V12	88	(Japan) Hisashi Wada	T	All
Raybrig Team Kunimitsu with Mooncraft	Honda	Honda NSX	Honda C32B 3.5 L V6	100	(Japan) Kunimitsu Takahashi	B	All
Raybrig Team Kunimitsu with Mooncraft	Honda	Honda NSX	Honda C32B 3.5 L V6	100	(Japan) Akira Iida	B	All

=== GT300 ===
Team	Make	Car	Engine	No.	Drivers	Tyre	Rounds
RE Amemiya Racing	Mazda	Mazda RX-7	Mazda RE20B 2.0 L 3-rotor	7	(Japan) Tetsuya Yamano	Y	All
RE Amemiya Racing	Mazda	Mazda RX-7	Mazda RE20B 2.0 L 3-rotor	7	(Japan) Haruhiko Matsumoto	Y	All
Team Daikokuya	Porsche	Porsche 993 RSR	Porsche M64/80 3.8 L F6	9	(Japan) Teruyuki Tokada	D	1, 3, 5
Team Daikokuya	Porsche	Porsche 993 RSR	Porsche M64/80 3.8 L F6	9	(Japan) Yukihiro Hane	D	1, 3, 5
Team Daikokuya	Porsche	Porsche 993 RSR	Porsche M64/80 3.8 L F6	99	(Japan) Akira Yoshitomi	D	All
Team Daikokuya	Porsche	Porsche 993 RSR	Porsche M64/80 3.8 L F6	99	(Japan) Tsunefumi Hioki	D	1–2, 4–7
Team Daikokuya	Porsche	Porsche 993 RSR	Porsche M64/80 3.8 L F6	99	(Japan) Kiichi Takahashi	D	3
Ability Motorsport	Porsche	Porsche 993 GT2	Porsche M64/82 3.6 L Turbo F6	10	(Japan) Yasutaka Hinoi	Y	All
Ability Motorsport	Porsche	Porsche 993 GT2	Porsche M64/82 3.6 L Turbo F6	10	(Japan) Hidehiko Aso	Y	All
Alta Racing Team	Nissan	Nissan Silvia (S14)	Nissan SR20DET 2.1 L Turbo I4	14	(Japan) Tetsuo Kozai	Y	1–3, 5, 7
Alta Racing Team	Nissan	Nissan Silvia (S14)	Nissan SR20DET 2.1 L Turbo I4	14	(Japan) Nobuo Komiya	Y	1–3, 5, 7
Nismo	Nissan	Nissan Silvia (S15)	Nissan SR20DET 2.1 L Turbo I4	15	(Japan) Takeshi Tsuchiya	Y	All
Nismo	Nissan	Nissan Silvia (S15)	Nissan SR20DET 2.1 L Turbo I4	15	(Japan) Yuji Ide	Y	All
Racing Project Bandoh	Toyota	Toyota Celica	Toyota 3S-GE 2.0 L I4	19	(Japan) Manabu Orido	Y	All
Racing Project Bandoh	Toyota	Toyota Celica	Toyota 3S-GE 2.0 L I4	19	(Japan) Takahiro Hara	Y	All
TOM'S Spirit	Toyota	Toyota Celica	Toyota 3S-GTE 2.0 L Turbo I4	20	(Japan) Masahiro Matsunaga	Y	2, 4–7
TOM'S Spirit	Toyota	Toyota Celica	Toyota 3S-GTE 2.0 L Turbo I4	20	(Japan) Yasuhisa Fujiwara	Y	2, 4
TOM'S Spirit	Toyota	Toyota Celica	Toyota 3S-GTE 2.0 L Turbo I4	20	(Japan) Kumi Sato	Y	5–7
Hitotsuyama Racing	BMW	BMW M3 (E36)	BMW S14 2.2 L Turbo I4	21	(Japan) Daisuke Itō	T	All
Hitotsuyama Racing	BMW	BMW M3 (E36)	BMW S14 2.2 L Turbo I4	21	(Japan) Yasushi Hitotsuyama	T	1–3, 5
Hitotsuyama Racing	BMW	BMW M3 (E36)	BMW S14 2.2 L Turbo I4	21	(Japan) Mikio Hitotsuyama	T	4, 6–7
Hirano Motorsport	Nissan	Nissan Skyline GTS-i (R32)	Nissan RB20DETT 2.0 L Twin Turbo I6	24	(Japan) Toshiyuki Hirano	Y	2, 5
Hirano Motorsport	Nissan	Nissan Skyline GTS-i (R32)	Nissan RB20DETT 2.0 L Twin Turbo I6	24	(Japan) Teruhiko Someba	Y	2, 5
Momo Corse Racing Team with Tsuchiya	Toyota	Toyota MR2	Toyota 3S-GTE 2.0 L Turbo I4	25	(Japan) Morio Nitta	Y	All
Momo Corse Racing Team with Tsuchiya	Toyota	Toyota MR2	Toyota 3S-GTE 2.0 L Turbo I4	25	(Japan) Yasushi Kikuchi	Y	1
Momo Corse Racing Team with Tsuchiya	Toyota	Toyota MR2	Toyota 3S-GTE 2.0 L Turbo I4	25	(Japan) Shinichi Takagi	Y	2–7, NC
Team Taisan	Porsche	Porsche 993 GT3-R (Rd. 1–4); Porsche 996 GT3-R (Rd. 5–7)	Porsche M96/77 3.6 L F6	26	(Japan) Hiroaki Suga	Y	1–4
Team Taisan	Porsche	Porsche 993 GT3-R (Rd. 1–4); Porsche 996 GT3-R (Rd. 5–7)	Porsche M96/77 3.6 L F6	26	(Sri Lanka) Dilantha Malagamuwa	Y	2–3
Team Taisan	Porsche	Porsche 993 GT3-R (Rd. 1–4); Porsche 996 GT3-R (Rd. 5–7)	Porsche M96/77 3.6 L F6	26	(Germany) Dominik Schwager	Y	4–7, NC
Team Taisan	Porsche	Porsche 993 GT3-R (Rd. 1–4); Porsche 996 GT3-R (Rd. 5–7)	Porsche M96/77 3.6 L F6	26	(Japan) Hideshi Matsuda	Y	5–7, NC
Team Taisan	Porsche	Porsche 993 GT3-R (Rd. 1–4); Porsche 996 GT3-R (Rd. 5–7)	Porsche M96/77 3.6 L F6	26	(Japan) Tomohiko Sunako	Y	1
Team Taisan	Porsche	Porsche 993 GT3-R	Porsche M64/75 3.6 L F6	55	(Japan) Hiroaki Suga	Y	5–7
Team Taisan	Porsche	Porsche 993 GT3-R	Porsche M64/75 3.6 L F6	55	(Japan) Eiichi Tajima	Y	5–7
Team Taeivon Ralliart	Mitsubishi	Mitsubishi FTO	Mitsubishi 4G63 2.0 L Turbo I4	61	(Republic of Ireland) Ralph Firman	T	All
Team Taeivon Ralliart	Mitsubishi	Mitsubishi FTO	Mitsubishi 4G63 2.0 L Turbo I4	61	(Japan) Akihiko Nakaya	T	1, 3–7
Team Taeivon Ralliart	Mitsubishi	Mitsubishi FTO	Mitsubishi 4G63 2.0 L Turbo I4	61	(Argentina) Rubén Derfler	T	2
Team Gaikokuya	Porsche	Porsche 993 GT2	Porsche M64/82 3.6 L Turbo F6	70	(Japan) Yoshimi Ishibashi	Y	All
Team Gaikokuya	Porsche	Porsche 993 GT2	Porsche M64/82 3.6 L Turbo F6	70	(Belgium) Patrick van Schoote	Y	1, 5, 7
Team Gaikokuya	Porsche	Porsche 993 GT2	Porsche M64/82 3.6 L Turbo F6	70	(Japan) Kaoru Hoshino	Y	2, 6
Team Gaikokuya	Porsche	Porsche 993 GT2	Porsche M64/82 3.6 L Turbo F6	70	(Japan) Hiroshi Sakai	Y	3–4
SigmaTec Racing Team	Porsche	Porsche 993 GT2	Porsche M64/82 3.6 L Turbo F6	71	(Japan) Masaki Jyonai	Y	All
SigmaTec Racing Team	Porsche	Porsche 993 GT2	Porsche M64/82 3.6 L Turbo F6	71	(Japan) Naohiro Kawano	Y	All
Okura Rotary Racing	Mazda	Mazda RX-7	Mazda RE20B 2.0 L 3-rotor	72	(Japan) Akira Ishikawa	Y	All
Okura Rotary Racing	Mazda	Mazda RX-7	Mazda RE20B 2.0 L 3-rotor	72	(Japan) Koh Hirano	Y	All
Cusco Racing	Subaru	Subaru Impreza WRX STI	Subaru EJ20 2.0 L Turbo F4	77	(Japan) Katsuo Kobayashi	Y	All
Cusco Racing	Subaru	Subaru Impreza WRX STI	Subaru EJ20 2.0 L Turbo F4	77	(Japan) Tatsuya Tanigawa	Y	All
Team Daishin	Nissan	Nissan Silvia (S15)	Nissan SR20DET 2.0 L Turbo I4	81	(Japan) Hideo Fukuyama	Y	All
Team Daishin	Nissan	Nissan Silvia (S15)	Nissan SR20DET 2.0 L Turbo I4	81	(Japan) Nobuyuki Ohyagi	Y	All
I.A. Tec Racing Team	Nissan	Nissan Silvia (S14)	Nissan SR20DET 2.0 L Turbo I4	84	(Japan) Seiichi Sodeyama	Y	2, 5–7
I.A. Tec Racing Team	Nissan	Nissan Silvia (S14)	Nissan SR20DET 2.0 L Turbo I4	84	(Japan) Yoshikuni Nakamura	Y	2, 5–7
KRAFT	Toyota	Toyota Corolla Sprinter Trueno (AE86)	Toyota 3S-GTE 2.0 L Turbo I4	86	(Japan) Minoru Tanaka	T	2–7
KRAFT	Toyota	Toyota Corolla Sprinter Trueno (AE86)	Toyota 3S-GTE 2.0 L Turbo I4	86	(Japan) Eiki Amemiya	T	2–7
Team Gainer	Ferrari	Ferrari F355 GT	Ferrari F129B 3.5 L V8	111	(Japan) Junichi Ikura	Y	2, 5–7
Team Gainer	Ferrari	Ferrari F355 GT	Ferrari F129B 3.5 L V8	111	(Japan) Yusei Maki	Y	2, 5–7
Club: Yellow Magic	Ferrari	Ferrari F355 GT	Ferrari F129B 3.6 L V8	355	(Japan) Taki Inoue	Y	2–3, 5, 7
Club: Yellow Magic	Ferrari	Ferrari F355 GT	Ferrari F129B 3.6 L V8	355	(Japan) Tsuyoshi Takahashi	Y	2–3, 5, 7
910 Racing	Porsche	Porsche 993 RSR	Porsche M64/80 3.8 L F6	910	(Japan) Atsushi Yogo	Y	1–3, 5–7
910 Racing	Porsche	Porsche 993 RSR	Porsche M64/80 3.8 L F6	910	(Japan) Hideyuki Tamamoto	Y	1–3
910 Racing	Porsche	Porsche 993 RSR	Porsche M64/80 3.8 L F6	910	(Sri Lanka) Dilantha Malagamuwa	Y	5–6
910 Racing	Porsche	Porsche 993 RSR	Porsche M64/80 3.8 L F6	910	(Japan) Tomohiko Sunako	Y	7
910 Racing	Porsche	Porsche 993 RSR	Porsche M64/80 3.8 L F6	911	(Japan) Masamitsu Ishihara	Y	5
910 Racing	Porsche	Porsche 993 RSR	Porsche M64/80 3.8 L F6	911	(Japan) Hiroyuki Noji	Y	5

== Schedule ==
Round	Race	Circuit	Date
1	Suzuka GT 300	(Japan) Suzuka Circuit	March 21
2	All Japan Fuji GT Race	(Japan) Fuji Speedway	May 2
3	SUGO GT Championship	(Japan) Sportsland SUGO	May 30
4	CP Mine GT Race	(Japan) Mine Circuit	July 11
5	JPN Special GT Cup	(Japan) Fuji Speedway	August 8
6	GT Championship in TI	(Japan) TI Circuit	September 26
7	Motegi GT Championship Race	(Japan) Twin Ring Motegi	October 24
NC	Nicos Cup GT AllStar	(Japan) Autopolis	November 28

== Season results ==
Round	Circuit	GT500 Winning Team	GT300 Winning Team
Round	Circuit	GT500 Winning Drivers	GT300 Winning Drivers
1	Suzuka	(Japan) #18 Takata Honda NSX	(Japan) #19 Racing Project Bandoh Toyota Celica
1	Suzuka	(Japan) Juichi Wakisaka (Japan) Katsutomo Kaneishi	(Japan) Takahiko Hara (Japan) Manabu Orido
2	Mt. Fuji	(Japan) #100 Raybrig Honda NSX	(Japan) #25 MOMOCORSE A'PEX Toyota MR2
2	Mt. Fuji	(Japan) Kunimitsu Takahashi (Japan) Akira Iida	(Japan) Shinichi Takagi (Japan) Morio Nitta
3	Sportsland SUGO	(Japan) #36 Castrol TOM'S Toyota Supra	(Japan) #15 Xanavi ARTA Nissan Silvia
3	Sportsland SUGO	(Japan) Takuya Kurosawa (Japan) Masanori Sekiya	(Japan) Yuji Ide (Japan) Takeshi Tsuchiya
4	Mine Circuit	(Japan) #1 Pennzoil Nissan Skyline GT-R	(Japan) #15 Xanavi ARTA Nissan Silvia
4	Mine Circuit	(Japan) Satoshi Motoyama (France) Érik Comas	(Japan) Yuji Ide (Japan) Takeshi Tsuchiya
5	Mt. Fuji	(Japan) #6 ESSO Team LeMans Toyota Supra	(Japan) #26 STP Advan Taisan Porsche 911 GT3 R
5	Mt. Fuji	(Japan) Hideki Noda (Australia) Wayne Gardner	(Japan) Hideshi Matsuda (Germany) Dominik Schwager
6	TI Circuit	(Japan) #64 Mobil 1 Honda NSX	(Japan) #15 Xanavi ARTA Nissan Silvia
6	TI Circuit	(Japan) Hidetoshi Mitsusada (Netherlands) Tom Coronel	(Japan) Yuji Ide (Japan) Takeshi Tsuchiya
7	Twin Ring Motegi	(Japan) #36 Castrol TOM'S Toyota Supra	(Japan) #26 STP Advan Taisan Porsche 911 GT3 R
7	Twin Ring Motegi	(Japan) Takuya Kurosawa (Japan) Masanori Sekiya	(Japan) Hideshi Matsuda (Germany) Dominik Schwager
NC	Autopolis	(Japan) #64 Mobil 1 Honda NSX	(Japan) #77 Cusco Subaru Impreza
NC	Autopolis	(Japan) Hidetoshi Mitsusada (Netherlands) Tom Coronel	(Japan) Tatsuya Tanigawa (Japan) Katsuo Kobayashi

== Point Ranking ==
=== GT500 ===
==== Drivers ====
Rank	No.	Driver	SUZ (Japan)	FUJ (Japan)	SUG (Japan)	MIN (Japan)	FUJ (Japan)	TAI (Japan)	MOT (Japan)	AUT (Japan)	Pts.
1	1	(France) Érik Comas	2	5	6	1	3	7	3	4	77
2	36	(Japan) Takuya Kurosawa (Japan) Masanori Sekiya	4	9	1	10	4	4	1	6	73
3	1	(Japan) Satoshi Motoyama	2		6	1	3	7	3	4	69
4	18	(Japan) Juichi Wakisaka (Japan) Katsutomo Kaneishi	1	Ret	Ret	11	2	3	Ret	Ret	47
5	64	(Netherlands) Tom Coronel	11	14	4	Ret	8	1	5	1	41
6	2	(Japan) Aguri Suzuki	5	11	9	12	12	2	2	3	40
6	2	(Germany) Michael Krumm	5		9	12	12	2	2	3	40
8	12	(Japan) Kazuyoshi Hoshino (Japan) Masami Kageyama	10	3	5	6	5	10	7	11	40
9	37	(Japan) Toshio Suzuki	3	4	11	2	15	15	10	Ret	38
10	16	(Japan) Osamu Nakako (Japan) Ryō Michigami	14	12	3	3	9	16	4	5	36
11	100	(Japan) Kunimitsu Takahashi (Japan) Akira Iida	Ret	1	13	15	7	5	9	2	34
12	6	(Japan) Hideki Noda (Australia) Wayne Gardner		8	16	5	1	9	13	15	33
13	64	(Japan) Hidetoshi Mitsusada					8	1	5	1	31
14	38	(Japan) Hironori Takeuchi (Japan) Yuji Tachikawa	7	2	Ret	8	6	8	12	7	31
15	37	(Japan) Ukyo Katayama	3		11	2	15	15	10	Ret	28
16	35	(France) Pierre-Henri Raphanel (Japan) Shinichi Yamaji	13	Ret	2	14	13	6	6		27
17	3	(Japan) Masahiro Hasemi (Japan) Tetsuya Tanaka	6	7	7	4	11	12	8	9	27
18	32	(Japan) Takayuki Kinoshita (Japan) Masahiko Kondo	8	6	8	Ret	Ret	11	15	8	12
19	64	(Japan) Koji Yamanishi	11	14	4	Ret					10
19	37	(United Kingdom) Darren Manning		4							10
21	1	(Sweden) Anders Olofsson		5							8
22	39	(Japan) Keiichi Tsuchiya (Japan) Masahiko Kageyama	16	15	Ret	7	10	13	Ret	13	5
23	30	(Japan) Yoji Yamada (Japan) Hideki Okada	17	Ret	12	9	14	14	11	14	2
23	55	(Japan) Eiichi Tajima	9	13	15	13				10	2
23	55	(Japan) Hideshi Matsuda	9	13		13					2
27	11	(Japan) Takao Wada (Japan) Mitsuhiro Kinoshita	12	10	10		16				2
	2	(Germany) Armin Hahne		11							0
	88	(Japan) Hisashi Wada (Japan) Naohiro Furuya	15	Ret	14	Ret	17	Ret	14	12	0
	55	(Germany) Dominik Schwager			15						0
	55	(Japan) Motoyuki Yasuyuki								10	0
Rank	No.	Driver	SUZ (Japan)	FUJ (Japan)	SUG (Japan)	MIN (Japan)	FUJ (Japan)	TAI (Japan)	MOT (Japan)	AUT (Japan)	Pts.

==== Teams' standings ====
For teams that entered multiple cars, only the best result from each round counted towards the teams' championship.

Rank	Team	No.	SUZ (Japan)	FUJ (Japan)	SUG (Japan)	MIN (Japan)	FUJ (Japan)	TAI (Japan)	MOT (Japan)	AUT (Japan)	Pts.
1	Toyota Castrol Team TOM'S	36	4	9	1	10	4	4	1	6	97
1	Toyota Castrol Team TOM'S	37	3	4	11	2	15	15	10	Ret	97
2	Nismo	1	2	5	6	1	3	7	3	4	91
2	Nismo	2	5	11	9	12	12	2	2	3	91
3	Mugen x Dome Project	16	14	12	3	3	9	16	4	5	81
3	Mugen x Dome Project	18	1	Ret	Ret	11	2	3	Ret	Ret	81
4	Mobil 1 Nakajima Racing	64	11	14	4	Ret	8	1	5	1	41
5	Team Impul	12	10	3	5	6	5	10	7	11	40
6	Team Kunimitsu with Mooncraft	100	Ret	1	13	15	7	5	9	2	34
7	Esso Ultron Toyota Team LeMans	6	DNP	8	16	5	1	9	13	15	33
8	Toyota Team Cerumo	38	7	2	Ret	8	6	8	12	7	31
9	MatsumotoKiyoshi Team TOM'S	35	13	Ret	2	14	13	6	6		27
10	Hasemi Motorsports	3	6	7	7	4	11	12	8	9	27
11	cdma One Toyota Team Cerumo with Key's	32	8	6	8	Ret	Ret	11	15	8	12
12	Toyota Team SARD	39	16	15	Ret	7	10	13	Ret	13	5
13	Team Taisan Advan	55	9	13	15	13				10	2
14	Team Take One	30	17	Ret	12	9	14	14	11	14	2
15	Endless Sports	11	12	10	10		16				2
-	JLOC	88	15	Ret	14	Ret	17	Ret	14	12	0
Rank	Team	No.	SUZ (Japan)	FUJ (Japan)	SUG (Japan)	MIN (Japan)	FUJ (Japan)	TAI (Japan)	MOT (Japan)	AUT (Japan)	PTS

=== GT300 Drivers' championship ===
Rank	No.	Driver	SUZ (Japan)	FUJ (Japan)	SUG (Japan)	MIN (Japan)	FUJ (Japan)	TAI (Japan)	MOT (Japan)	AUT (Japan)	Pts.
1	25	(Japan) Morio Nitta	8	1	2	2	5	Ret	3	6	73
2	15	(Japan) Takeshi Tsuchiya (Japan) Yuji Ide	9	Ret	1	1	NC	1	4	3	72
3	19	(Japan) Manabu Orido (Japan) Takahiko Hara	1	2	Ret	3	Ret	5	2	5	70
3	25	(Japan) Shinichi Takagi		1	2	2	5	Ret	3	6	70
5	7	(Japan) Tetsuya Yamano (Japan) Haruhiko Matsumoto	4	4	Ret	12	2	2	5	2	58
6	61	(Republic of Ireland) Ralph Firman	2	Ret	5	Ret	3	8	7		42
6	61	(Japan) Akihiko Nakaya	2		5	Ret	3	8	7		42
8	26	(Germany) Dominik Schwager				Ret	1	Ret	1	7	40
8	26	(Japan) Hideshi Matsuda					1	Ret	1	7	40
10	81	(Japan) Hideo Fukuyama (Japan) Nobuyuki Oyagi	10	Ret	3	Ret	4	4	Ret	4	33
11	77	(Japan) Katsuo Kobayashi (Japan) Tatsuya Tanigawa	Ret	NC	4	8	18	3	6	1	31
12	14	(Japan) Tetsuo Kozai (Japan) Nobuo Komiya	6	5	7		6		8		27
13	70	(Japan) Yoshimi Ishibashi	7	6	8	4	11	10	13		24
14	910	(Japan) Atsushi Yogo	3	7	Ret		8	9	9		23
15	71	(Japan) Masaki Jyonai (Japan) Naohiro Kawano	DSQ	3	6	11	19	Ret	Ret		18
16	26/55	(Japan) Hiroaki Suga	5	Ret	Ret	Ret	7	6	11		18
17	910	(Japan) Hideyuki Tamamoto	3	7	Ret						16
18	70	(Japan) Hiroshi Sakai			8	4					13
19	86	(Japan) Minoru Tanaka (Japan) Eiki Amemiya		DNP	11	5	10	7	Ret		13
20	26/910	(Japan) Tomohiko Sunako	5						9		10
21	55	(Japan) Eiichi Tajima					7	6	11		10
22	70	(Japan) Kaoru Hoshino		6				10			7
23	20	(Japan) Masahiro Matsunaga		11		6	Ret	DNS	14		6
23	20	(Japan) Yasuhisa Fujiwara		11		6					6
25	21	(Japan) Daisuke Itō	12	NC	12	7	9	14	DNA		6
26	26/910	(Sri Lanka) Dilantha Malagamuwa		Ret	Ret		8	9			5
27	70	(Belgium) Patrick van Schoote	7				11		13		4
27	21	(Japan) Mikio Hitotsuyama				7		14	DNA		4
29	99	(Japan) Akira Yoshitomi	11	9	13	9	17	11	12		4
29	99	(Japan) Tsunefumi Hioki	11	9		9	17	11	12		4
31	10	(Japan) Yasutaka Hinoi (Japan) Hidehiko Aso	DNQ	10	9	Ret	15	12	10		4
32	25	(Japan) Yasushi Kikuchi	8								3
32	355	(Japan) Taki Inoue (Japan) Tsuyoshi Takahashi		8	Ret		12		Ret		3
34	21	(Japan) Yasushi Hitotsuyama	12	NC	12		9				2
35	9	(Japan) Teruyuki Tokada (Japan) Yukihiro Hane	Ret		10			13			1
35	72	(Japan) Akira Ishikawa (Japan) Koh Hirano	Ret	Ret	DNA	10	13	Ret	Ret	Ret	1
NC	99	(Japan) Kiichi Takahashi			13						0
NC	20	(Japan) Kumi Sato					Ret	DNS	14		0
NC	911	(Japan) Masamitsu Ishihara (Japan) Hiroyuki Noji					14				0
NC	111	(Japan) Junichi Ikura (Japan) Yusei Maki		Ret			16	NC	Ret		0
NC	84	(Japan) Seiichi Sodeyama (Japan) Yoshikuni Nakamura		Ret			DNQ	DNA			0
NC	61	(Argentina) Rubén Derfler		Ret							0
NC	24	(Japan) Toshiyuki Hirano (Japan) Teruhiko Someba		DNS			DNQ				0
Rank	No.	Driver	SUZ (Japan)	FUJ (Japan)	SUG (Japan)	MIN (Japan)	FUJ (Japan)	TAI (Japan)	MOT (Japan)	AUT (Japan)	Pts.

==== GT300 Teams' standings ====
For teams that entered multiple cars, only the best result from each round counted towards the teams' championship.

Rank	Team	No.	SUZ (Japan)	FUJ (Japan)	SUG (Japan)	MIN (Japan)	FUJ (Japan)	TAI (Japan)	MOT (Japan)	AUT (Japan)	Pts.
1	Momo Corse Racing Team with Tsuchiya	25	8	1	2	2	5	Ret	3	6	73
2	Xanavi Nismo	15	9	Ret	1	1	NC	1	4	3	72
3	Racing Project Bandoh	19	1	2	Ret	3	Ret	5	2	5	70
4	RE Amemiya Racing	7	4	4	Ret	12	2	2	5	2	58
5	Team Taisan Jr. with Advan	26	5	Ret	Ret	Ret	1	Ret	1	7	48
6	Team Taeivon Ralliart	61	2	Ret	5	Ret	3	8	7		42
7	Team Daishin	81	10	Ret	3	Ret	4	4	Ret	4	33
8	Cusco Racing	77	Ret	NC	4	8	18	3	6	1	31
9	Alta Racing Team	14	6	5	7		6		8		27
10	Team Gaikokuya	70	7	6	8	4	11	10	13		24
11	910 Racing	910	3	7	Ret		8	9	9		23
11	910 Racing	911					14				23
12	SigmaTec Racing Team	71	DSQ	3	6	11	19	Ret	Ret		18
13	KRAFT	86		DNP	11	5	10	7	Ret		13
14	Team Taisan with Advan	55					7	6	11		10
15	TOM'S Spirit	20		11		6	Ret	DNS	14		6
16	Hitotsuyama Racing	21	12	NC	12	7	9	14	DNA		6
17	Team Daikokuya	9	Ret		10			13			5
17	Team Daikokuya	99	11	9	13	9	17	11	12		5
18	Ability Motorsport	10	DNQ	10	9	Ret	15	12	10		4
19	Club: Yellow Magic	355		8	Ret		12		Ret		3
20	Okura Rotary Racing	72	Ret	Ret	DNA	10	13	Ret	Ret	Ret	1
-	Team Gainer	111		Ret			16	NC	Ret		0
-	I.A. Tec Racing Team	84		Ret			DNQ	DNA			0
-	Hirano Motorsport	24		DNS			DNQ				0
Rank	Team	No.	SUZ (Japan)	FUJ (Japan)	SUG (Japan)	MIN (Japan)	FUJ (Japan)	TAI (Japan)	MOT (Japan)	AUT (Japan)	Pts.
