= Tetsuya Yamano =

Japanese racing driver

Tetsuya Yamano (Shinjitai: 山野 哲也, born 2 October 1965, in Tokyo) is a Japanese racing driver. He won three consecutive JGTC/Super GT GT300 class championship, notably with three different teams in all occasions.

== Complete JGTC/Super GT Results ==
Year	Team	Car	Class	1	2	3	4	5	6	7	8	9	DC	Pts
1999	RE Amemiya Racing	Mazda RX-7	GT300	SUZ; 4	FSW; 4	SUG; Ret	MIN; 12	FSW; 2	TAI; 2	TRM; 5			5th	58
2000	RE Amemiya Racing	Mazda RX-7	GT300	TRM; 2	FSW; 5	SUG; Ret	FSW; 3	TAI; Ret	MIN; 4	SUZ; 3			5th	57
2001	RE Amemiya Racing	Mazda RX-7	GT300	TAI; 3	FSW; 5	SUG; 1	FSW; 4	TRM; 7	SUZ; 15	MIN; 11			2rd	54
2002	Hasemi MotorSports	Nissan Silvia	GT300	TAI; 4	FSW; Ret	SUG; 1	SEP; 3	FSW; 3	TRM; 4	MIN; Ret	SUZ; Ret		3rd	70
2003	AMPREX MOTORSPORTS	Mazda RX-7	GT300	TAI	FSW	SUG	FSW	FSW; NC	TRM				NC	0
2003	AMPREX MOTORSPORTS	BMW M3	GT300							AUT; 14	SUZ; Ret		NC	0
2004	M-TEC CO., LTD.	Honda NSX	GT300	TAI; 3	SUG; 7	SEP; 2	TOK; 2	TRM; 2	AUT; 6	SUZ; 1			1st	93
2005	TEAM RECKLESS	Toyota MR-S	GT300	OKA; 5	FSW; 3	SEP; 2	SUG; 3	TRM; 8	FSW; 3	AUT; 1	SUZ; 3		1st	93
2006	RE Amemiya Racing	Mazda RX-7	GT300	SUZ; 2	OKA	FSW; 11	SEP; 1	SUG; 9	SUZ; 4	TRM; 4	AUT; 2	FSW; 6	1st	86
2007	CUSCO RACING	Subaru Impreza	GT300	SUZ; 21	OKA; 13	FSW; Ret	SEP; 5	SUG; Ret	SUZ; Ret	TRM; 11	AUT; 14	FSW; 11	22nd	7
2008	CUSCO RACING	Subaru Impreza	GT300	SUZ; 6	OKA; 3	FSW; 18	SEP; 1	SUG; 14	SUZ; 17	TRM; 14	AUT; 6	FSW; 3	6th	59
2009	R&D Sport	Subaru Legacy B4	GT300	OKA	SUZ	FSW	SEP	SUG	SUZ; DNQ	FSW; 18	AUT	TRM; Ret	NC	0
2010	R&D Sport	Subaru Legacy B4	GT300	SUZ; 13	OKA; 12	FSW; Ret	SEP	SUG; 13	SUZ; 1	FSW; C	TRM; 10		11th	21
2011	R&D Sport	Subaru Legacy B4	GT300	OKA; 8	FSW; 18	SEP; 8	SUG; Ret	SUZ; 1	FSW; 6	AUT; 1	TRM; 6		4th	56
2012	R&D Sport	Subaru BRZ	GT300	OKA; Ret	FSW; 9	SEP; 8	SUG; 10	SUZ; Ret	FSW; 6	AUT; 4	TRM; 15		14th	19
2013	R&D Sport	Subaru BRZ	GT300	OKA; 5	FSW; Ret	SEP; 4	SUG; 6	SUZ; 1	FSW; 9	AUT; 7	TRM; 3		4th	66
