= Shinichi Takagi =

Japanese racing driver

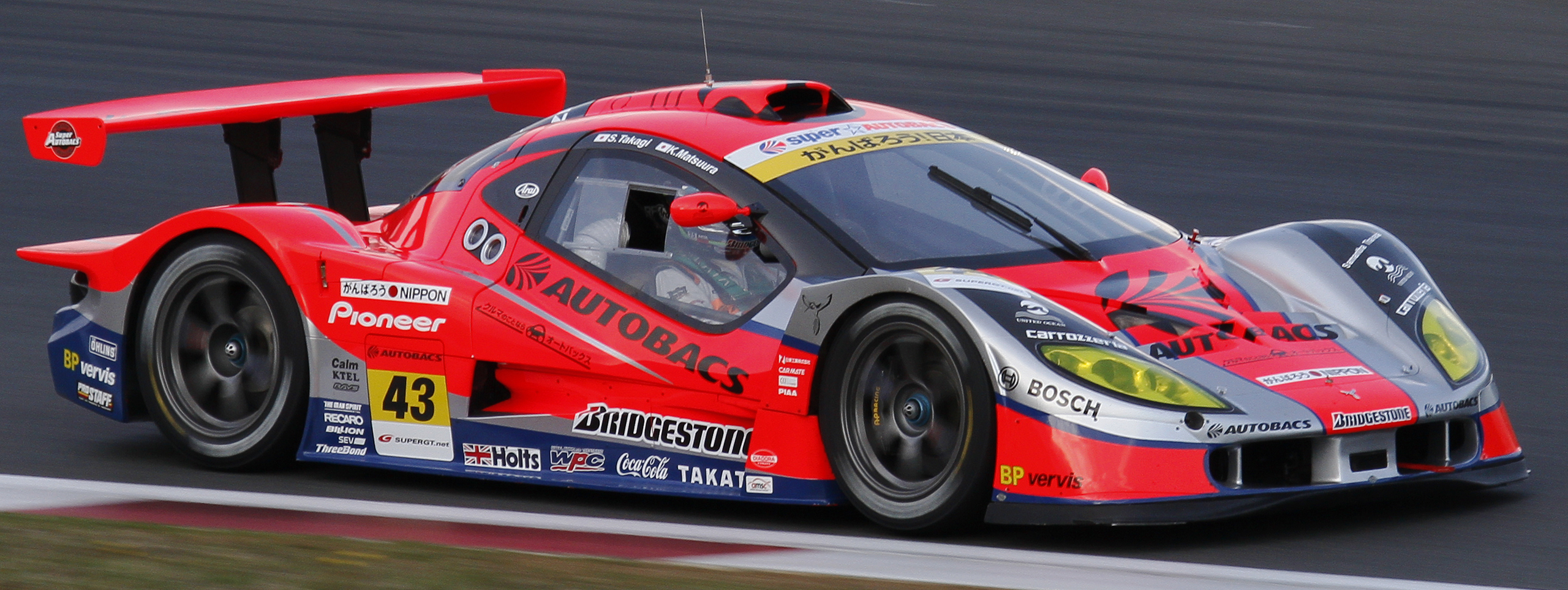
- Nationality: (Japan) Japanese
- Born: 6 May 1970 (age 56) Yanai, Yamaguchi, Japan

Super GT career
- Debut season: 1998
- Current team: K-tunes racing
- Categorisation: FIA Gold (until 2020); FIA Silver (2021–)
- Car number: 96
- Former teams: INGING, Momo Corse Racing Team with Tsuchiya, Super Autobacs Racing with A'PEX, Autobacs Racing Team Aguri, apr
- Starts: 188
- Wins: 20
- Podiums: 57
- Poles: 18
- Fastest laps: 13
- Best finish: 1st in 2002, 2019

Championship titles
- 2002, 2019: Super GT

Shinichi Takagi (高木真一, Takagi Shin'ichi; born 6 May 1970) is a Japanese professional racing driver. He won the GT300 class Super GT championship in 2002 and 2019.

== Career ==
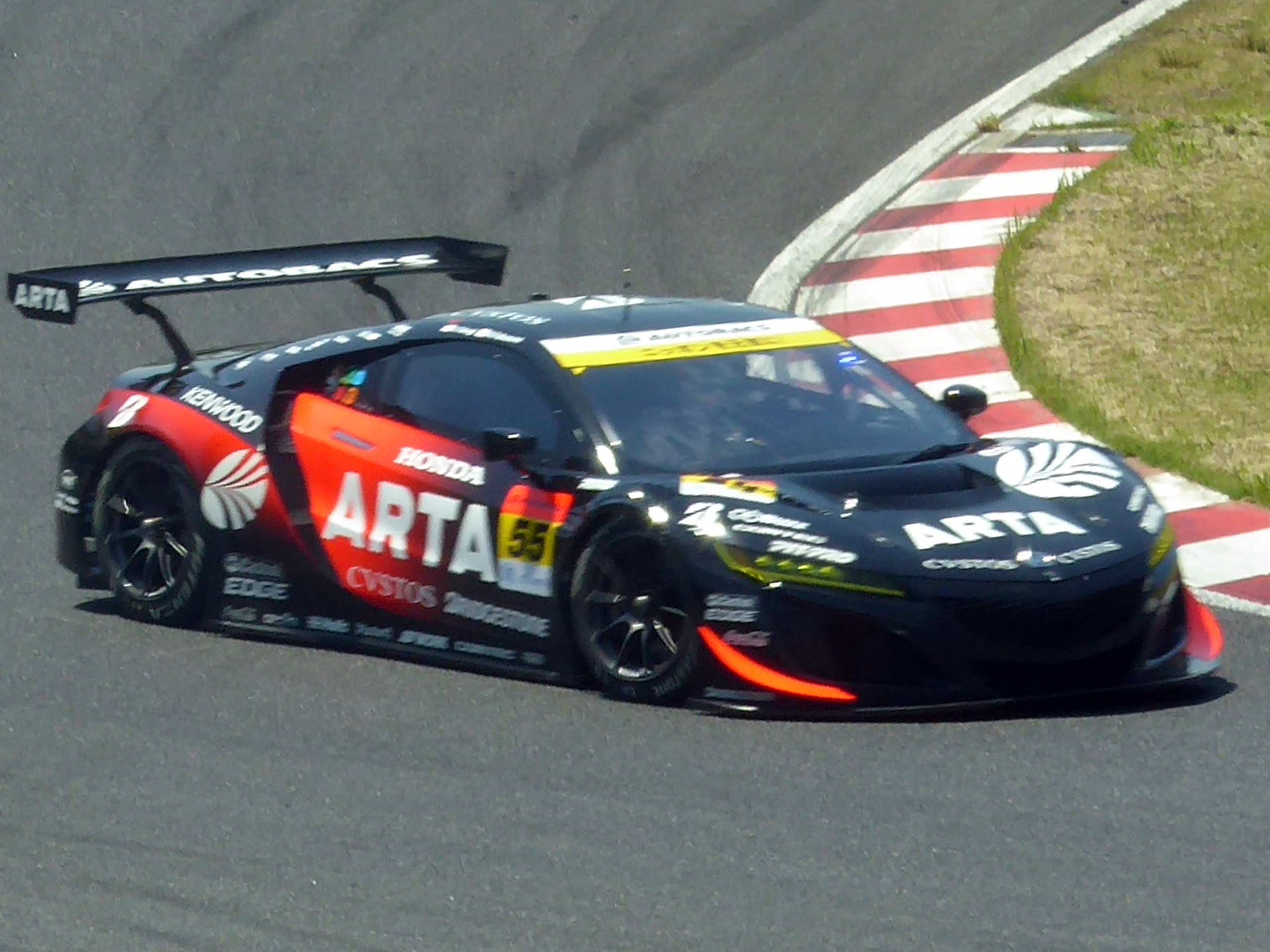
Takagi won the 2019 GT300 championship driving a Honda NSX GT3 Evo for ARTA.

Takagi made his debut in the All-Japan GT Championship (JGTC) in 1998, driving for INGING in the GT500 class. For the 1999 season, he switched to the GT300 class, finishing third in the championship that year. He won his maiden title in 2002 with Autobacs Racing Team Aguri (ARTA), driving an apr Racing-prepared Toyota MR-S alongside Morio Nitta. In the following years, with the series renamed as Super GT in 2005, Takagi won numerous races and finished runner-up in the standings in 2004, 2008, 2010 and 2018. In 2019, he won his second GT300 championship seventeen years after his first, driving the Honda NSX GT3 Evo of ARTA, with Takagi and his co-driver Nirei Fukuzumi finishing over ten points clear of the second place finishers.

== Complete JGTC/Super GT Results ==
(key) (Races in bold indicate pole position) (Races in italics indicate fastest lap)

Year	Team	Car	Class	1	2	3	4	5	6	7	8	9	DC	Pts
1998	Inging	Toyota Supra	GT500	SUZ; Ret	FUJ; C	SEN; Ret	FUJ; 13	MOT; Ret	MIN; 6	SUG; DNQ			18th	6
1999	MOMOCORSE Racing Team with Tsuchiya	Toyota MR2	GT300	SUZ	FUJ; 1	SUG; 2	MIN; 2	FUJ; 5	TAI; Ret	MOT; 3			**3rd**	**70**
2000	Super AUTOBACS Racing with A’PEX	Toyota MR-S	GT300	MOT	FUJ	SUG	FUJ; 6	TAI; Ret	MIN; 14	SUZ; 1			12th	26
2001	ARTA with A’PEX	Toyota MR-S	GT300	TAI; 1	FUJ; 3	SUG; Ret	FUJ; 5	MOT; Ret	SUZ; Ret	MIN; Ret			7th	40
2002	ARTA with A’PEX	Toyota MR-S	GT300	TAI; 1	FUJ; Ret	SUG; 17	SEP; 2	FUJ; 4	MOT; 5	MIN; 5	SUZ; 4		**1st**	**75**
2003	Autobacs Racing Team Aguri	ASL ARTA Garaiya	GT300	TAI; 19	FUJ; 3	SUG; 4	FUJ; 10	FUJ; 6	MOT; 2	AUT; 5	SUZ; NC		7th	55
2004	Autobacs Racing Team Aguri	ASL ARTA Garaiya	GT300	TAI; 2	SUG; 5	SEP; 21	TOK; 1	MOT; 1	AUT; 2	SUZ; 2			**2nd**	**92**
2005	Autobacs Racing Team Aguri	ASL ARTA Garaiya	GT300	OKA; 10	FUJ; 2	**SEP**; 1	SUG; 18	MOT; 3	FUJ; Ret	**AUT**; 2	SUZ; 8		**3rd**	**74**
2006	apr	Toyota MR-S	GT300	SUZ; Ret	OKA; 9	FUJ; 2	SEP; Ret	SUG; 5	SUZ; 3	MOT; 10	AUT; Ret	FUJ; 1	5th	60
2007	Autobacs Racing Team Aguri	ASL ARTA Garaiya	GT300	SUZ; 18	OKA; 17	FUJ; 1	SEP; Ret	SUG; Ret	SUZ; 2	**MOT**; 3	AUT; 5	FUJ; 7	4th	66
2008	Autobacs Racing Team Aguri	ASL ARTA Garaiya	GT300	SUZ; 5	**OKA**; 1	FUJ; 7	SEP; 12	SUG; 1	SUZ; Ret	MOT; 9	AUT; 2	FUJ; 9	**2nd**	**77**
2009	Autobacs Racing Team Aguri	ASL ARTA Garaiya	GT300	OKA; 2	SUZ; 5	**FUJ**; 1	SEP; 10	SUG; 9	SUZ; 2	FUJ; 7	**AUT**; 4	MOT; 14	5th	71
2010	Autobacs Racing Team Aguri	ASL ARTA Garaiya	GT300	SUZ; Ret	OKA; 6	FUJ; 2	SEP; 2	SUG; 6	SUZ; 2	FUJ; C	MOT; 12		**2nd**	**55**
2011	Autobacs Racing Team Aguri	ASL ARTA Garaiya	GT300	OKA; 20	FUJ; 6	SEP; 5	**SUG**; 3	**SUZ**; 20	FUJ; 12	AUT; 13	MOT; 7		12th	26
2012	Autobacs Racing Team Aguri	ASL ARTA Garaiya	GT300	OKA; 8	FUJ; 4	SEP; 9	SUG; 9	SUZ; 4	FUJ; 5	AUT; 17	MOT; 21		9th	33
2013	Autobacs Racing Team Aguri	Honda CR-Z GT	GT300	OKA; 12	FUJ; 19	**SEP**; 1	SUG; 1	SUZ; Ret	**FUJ**; 16	FUJ; Ret	AUT; 16	MOT; 15	7th	40
2014	Autobacs Racing Team Aguri	Honda CR-Z GT	GT300	OKA; 6	FUJ; 18	AUT; 1	SUG; 16	FUJ; 22	**SUZ**; 16	CHA; 13	MOT; 12		11th	25
2015	Autobacs Racing Team Aguri	Honda CR-Z GT	GT300	OKA; 2	FUJ; 17	CHA; 10	**FUJ**; 1	SUZ; 12	**SUG**; 12	AUT; 6	MOT; 4		6th	49
2016	Autobacs Racing Team Aguri	BMW M6 GT3	GT300	OKA; 11	**FUJ**; 2	SUG; Ret	**FUJ**; 1	SUZ; 14	CHA; 3	MOT; Ret	MOT; DNS		5th	48
2017	Autobacs Racing Team Aguri	BMW M6 GT3	GT300	OKA; 5	FUJ; 17	AUT; 3	SUG; Ret	**FUJ**; 1	SUZ; Ret	CHA; 4	MOT; 2		4th	61
2018	Autobacs Racing Team Aguri	BMW M6 GT3	GT300	OKA; 6	**FUJ**; 1	SUZ; 20	CHA; 11	FUJ; 1	SUG; 10	AUT; 4	MOT; 9		**2nd**	**62**
2019	ARTA	Honda NSX GT3	GT300	**OKA**; 2‡	FUJ; 2	SUZ; 6	CHA; 9	FUJ; 6	AUT; 6	SUG; 1	MOT; 4		**1st**	**69.5**
2020	ARTA	Honda NSX GT3	GT300	FUJ; 7	FUJ; 3	SUZ; 26	MOT; 7	FUJ; 2	FUJ; 7	MOT	FUJ		7th	38
2021	ARTA	Honda NSX GT3	GT300	OKA; 26	FUJ; 3	MOT; 23	SUZ; 7	SUG; 2	AUT; 20	MOT; 2	FUJ; 24		4th	45
2022	K-tunes Racing	Lexus RC F GT3	GT300	OKA; 27	FUJ; 6	SUZ; 7	FUJ; 5	SUZ; 25	SUG; 9	AUT; 8	MOT; 6		16th	22.5
2023	K-tunes Racing	Lexus RC F GT3	GT300	OKA; 14	FUJ; 9	SUZ; 22	FUJ; 23	SUZ; 8	**SUG**; 8	AUT; Ret	MOT; 5		18th	15
2024	K-tunes Racing	Lexus RC F GT3	GT300	OKA; 6	FUJ; 17	SUZ; 9	FUJ; Ret	SUG; Ret	AUT; 3	MOT; 14	SUZ; 9		13th	20
2025	K-tunes Racing	Lexus RC F GT3	GT300	OKA; 6	FUJ; 13	SEP; 16	FS1 (Ret)	FS2; 15	SUZ; 14	SUG; Ret	AUT; 17	MOT; 13	22nd	18.5
2026	K-tunes Racing	Lexus RC F GT3	GT300	OKA; 7	FUJ; 10	FUJ; 15	SUZ; 26	SUG; 24	AUT; 1	MOT; 1	MOT; 9		3rd	73

* Season still in progress.
