= Tomohiko Sunako =

Japanese racing driver

Tomohiko Sunako (砂子 智彦, Sunako Tomohiko; born 6 November 1964 in Tokyo), professionally known as Jukuchou Sunako (砂子塾長), is a semi-retired Japanese racing driver, motoring journalist, and driving instructor. He is the son of former Nissan works racing driver and Yamaha factory motorcycle racer, Yoshikazu Sunako.

Sunako competed in the Super Taikyu Series (formerly the N1 Endurance Series, and Super N1 Endurance Series) from 1990 to 2008. He won the Class 1 championship in 1996 driving a Nissan Skyline GT-R.

Sunako suffered a broken leg and minor burns in an accident at Fuji Speedway during the All-Japan Fuji GT Race on 3 May 1998, when his car spun off during the formation laps in torrential rain, and was then struck by the Ferrari F355 of Tetsuya Ota which also lost control and burst into flames. Sunako recovered from his injuries and continued to race in the All-Japan Grand Touring Car Championship / Super GT Series until 2006.

Sunako retired in 2008, but came back to racing in 2018 to compete in the GT World Challenge Asia series in a BMW Team Studie M4 GT4. Sunako and Takayuki Kinoshita steered BMW Team Studie to the GT4 teams' championship in 2018, and Sunako won the GT4 overall drivers' championship in 2019.

In 2012, Sunako established Tokyo Virtual Circuit, a simulator facility based in the Minato ward of Tokyo.

== Complete JGTC/Super GT Results ==
Year	Team	Car	Class	1	2	3	4	5	6	7	8	9	DC	Pts
1997	910 Racing	Porsche 911	GT300	SUZ	FUJ; 8	SEN; 4	FUJ	MIN					13th	13
1997	ecurie SiFo	Renault Sport Spider	GT300						SUG; 18				13th	13
1998	910 Racing	Porsche 911	GT300	SUZ; 5	FUJ; C	SEN	FUJ	MOT	MIN	SUG			23rd	8
1999	Team Taisan Jr.	Porsche 911	GT300	SUZ; 5	FUJ	SUG	MIN	FUJ	TAI				20th	10
1999	910 Racing	Porsche 911	GT300							MOT; 9			20th	10
2000	910 Racing	Porsche 911	GT300	MOT; Ret	FUJ; 8	SUG; Ret	FUJ; 9	TAI	MIN	SUZ; 12			25th	5
2001	910 Racing	Porsche 911	GT300	TAI; 5	FUJ; 6	SUG; 2	FUJ; 6	MOT; 10	SUZ; 4	MIN; 5			3rd	54
2002	Team Taisan Jr.	Porsche 911	GT300	TAI	FUJ; 7	SUG	SEP						21st	7
2002	910 Racing	Porsche 911	GT300					FUJ; 14	MOT	MIN; 8	SUZ		21st	7
2003	910 Racing	Porsche 911	GT300	TAI	FUJ; 17	SUG	FUJ; 21	FUJ; 15	MOT; 11	AUT	SUZ; 16		NC	0
2004	910 Racing	Porsche 911	GT300	TAI; 16	SUG; 24	SEP; 15	TOK; 19	MOT; 12	AUT; 22	SUZ; 20			NC	0
2005	910 Racing	Porsche 911	GT300	OKA; Ret	FUJ; 18	SEP; 15	SUG; 15	MOT; 17	FUJ; Ret	AUT; 15	SUZ; 20		NC	0
2006	Endless Sports	Porsche 911	GT300	SUZ	OKA	FUJ	SEP	SUG	SUZ; Ret	MOT	AUT	FUJ	NC	0
