= RE Amemiya =

Japanese tuning company

- Type: Public
- Industry: Car tuning
- Founded: 1974
- Founder: Isami Amemiya
- Headquarters: Tomisato, Chiba Prefecture, Japan
- Key people: Isami Amemiya
- Owner: Isami Amemiya
- Website: http://www.re-amemiya.co.jp

RE Amemiya Car Co., Ltd. (有限会社RE雨宮自動車, Yūgen Kaisha Āru-ī Amemiya Jidōsha) is a car tuning company from Tomisato, Chiba Prefecture, Japan, founded by Isami Amemiya (雨宮 勇美, Amemiya Isami) in 1974. Amemiya and his company are known for their expertise in tuning rotary-powered Mazdas; the "RE" in its name is an allusion to the rotary engine.

== In popular culture ==
RE Amemiya's cars are often featured in touge races on the Japanese show Hot Version; these races are run in a cat-and-mouse fashion, much like in Initial D. The RE Amemiya-tuned Mazda FD3S RX-7 has competed against the Amuse Honda S2000, the J's Racing Honda S2000 and the MCR Nissan R34 Skyline GT-R. RE Amemiya's blue FD3S held the title of "Maou" (魔王, Maō; "Demon King") from 2004 through 2006, before losing the title to the J's Racing car at the 2007 event as the battle conditions were in the rain. The company reclaimed the title of Maou after winning against the J's Racing S2000 in 2009 with a new green FD3S. Thus far, RE Amemiya has won the Maou title four times with three different cars.

Both the blue FD3S and its GT300 counterpart, as detailed below, are featured in Polyphony Digital's Gran Turismo series of racing video games.

In the anime and manga series Initial D, during the Project D arc, protagonists Keisuke and Ryosuke Takahashi's FD and FC RX-7s are equipped with bodykits from RE Amemiya, respectively.

== Motorsport ==
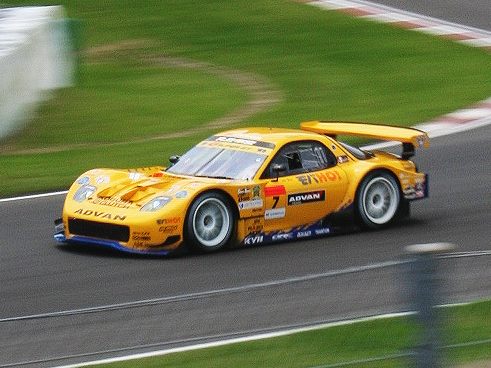
RE Amemiya RX-7 GT300

In addition to competing in tuner events, RE Amemiya began its participation as the lone rotary entry in the Super GT series in 1995, with a 3-rotor 20B-powered RX-7 in the GT300 class. The team achieved a GT300 victory in 2006 and would go on to achieve more success over the following seasons, including 3 more race wins and 11 podiums. In 2009, RE Amemiya finished 2nd in the GT300 Championship, narrowly being beaten by the Racing Project Bandoh Lexus IS350. In 2010, their final season in Super GT, RE Amemiya finished 3rd in the GT300 Championship behind Hasemi Motorsport and Autobacs Racing Team Aguri, respectively.

RE Amemiya have also competed in the D1 Grand Prix drifting series since 2004. For their second year of competition (2005), driver Masao Suenaga scored a victory at Fuji Speedway but finished as runner-up overall in the Grand Prix, losing by just one point to Yasuyuki Kazama.

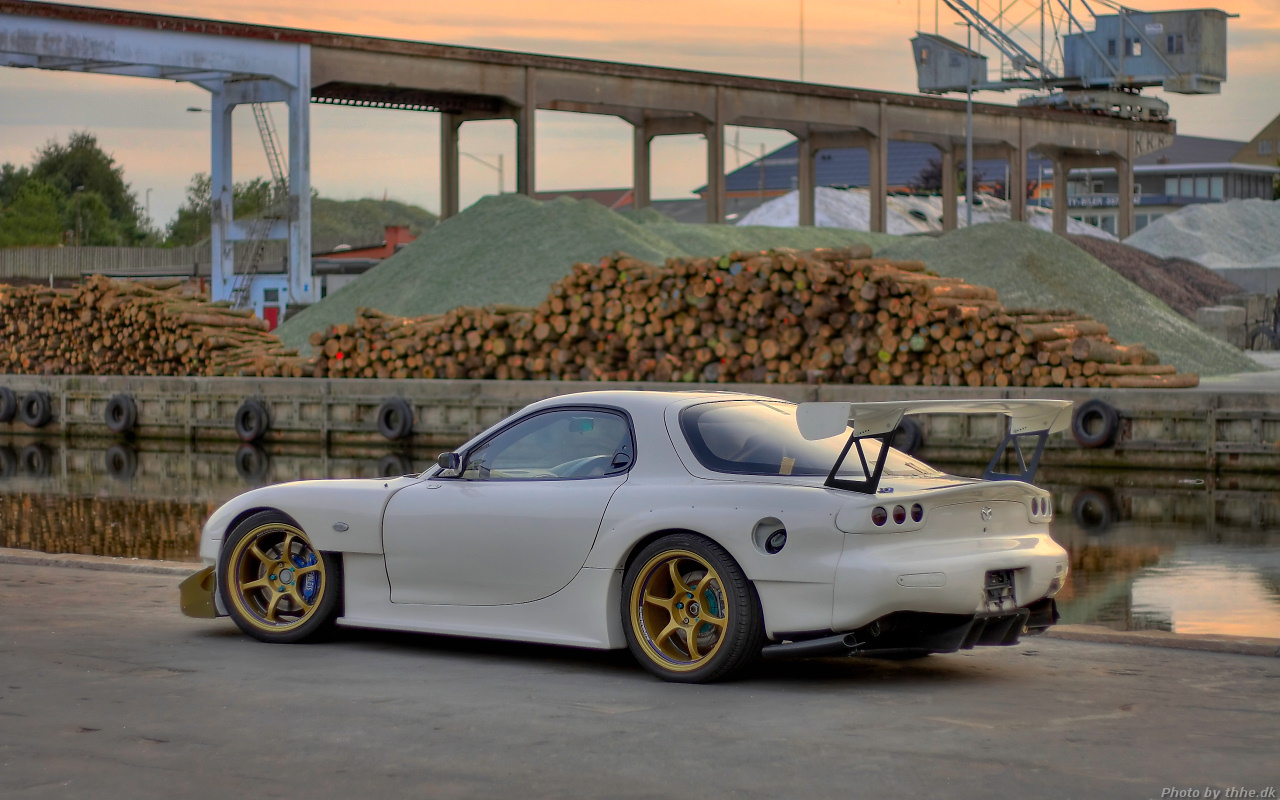
Mazda RX-7 fitted with RE Amemiya parts

== Racing results ==
=== Complete JGTC results ===
(key) Races in bold indicate pole position. Races in italics indicate fastest lap.

Year	Car	Tyres	Class	No.	Drivers	1	2	3	4	5	6	7	8	9	Pos	Pts
1995	Mazda RX-7	Y	GT2	7	(Japan) Hironori Takeuchi (Japan) Haruhiko Matsumoto	SUZ	FUJ; 9	SEN; 1	**FUJ**; 2	**SUG**; Ret	**MIN**; 1				**3rd**	**57**
1996	Mazda RX-7	D	GT300	7	(Japan) Shinichi Yamaji (Japan) Masato Yamamoto (Japan) Hisashi Wada (Japan) Haruhiko Matsumoto	SUZ; Ret	FUJ; 9	SEN; 3	FUJ; 3	SUG; 5	MIN; 6	**NC1**; 1			5th	40
1997	Mazda RX-7	D	GT300	7	(Japan) Shinichi Yamaji (Japan) Haruhiko Matsumoto	SUZ; Ret	FUJ; 3	SEN; 5	FUJ; Ret	MIN; 10	SUG; 4	NC1; 6	NC2; 10		7th	31
1998	Mazda RX-7	D	GT300	7	(Japan) Shinichi Yamaji (Japan) Haruhiko Matsumoto	SUZ; Ret	FUJ; C	SEN; 3	FUJ; 5	MOT; Ret	MIN; 9	SUG; 6	NC1; 2		8th	28
1999	Mazda RX-7	Y	GT300	7	(Japan) Tetsuya Yamano (Japan) Haruhiko Matsumoto	SUZ; 4	FUJ; 4	SUG; Ret	MIN; 12	FUJ; 2	OKA; 2	MOT; 5	NC1; 2		4th	58
2000	Mazda RX-7	Y	GT300	7	(Japan) Tetsuya Yamano (Japan) Haruhiko Matsumoto	MOT; 2	FUJ; 5	SUG; Ret	**NC1**; 1	FUJ; 3	OKA; Ret	MIN; 4	SUZ; 3		4th	57
2001	Mazda RX-7	Y	GT300	7	(Japan) Tetsuya Yamano (Japan) Haruhiko Matsumoto	OKA; 3	FUJ; 5	SUG; 1	NC1	FUJ; 4	MOT; 7	SUZ; 15	MIN; 11		**3rd**	**54**
2002	Mazda RX-7	Y	GT300	7	(Japan) Haruhiko Matsumoto (Japan) Nobuteru Taniguchi (Japan) Takayuki Kinoshita	OKA; 6	FUJ; 12	SUG; Ret	SEP; 1	FUJ; 12	MOT; Ret	MIN; Ret	SUZ; 3		8th	41
2003	Mazda RX-7	Y	GT300	7	(Japan) Nobuteru Taniguchi (Japan) Takashi Ooi (Japan) Haruhiko Matsumoto	OKA; 21	FUJ; 10	SUG; 3	FUJ; Ret	FUJ; Ret	MOT; 14	AUT; 20	SUZ; 6		12th	19
2004	Mazda RX-7	Y	GT300	7	(Japan) Hiroyuki Iiri (Japan) Shinichi Yamaji	OKA; 11	**SUG**; 4	SEP; 1	TOK; 10	MOT; Ret	**AUT**; 1	SUZ; 18	NC1; Ret	NC2; WD	4th	55

=== Complete Super GT results ===
(key) Races in bold indicate pole position. Races in italics indicate fastest lap.

Year	Car	Tyres	Class	No.	Drivers	1	2	3	4	5	6	7	8	9	10	Pos	Points
2005	Mazda RX-7	Y	GT300	7	(Japan) Hiroyuki Iiri (Japan) Shinichi Yamaji	OKA; 2	FUJ; Ret	SEP; 8	SUG; 4	MOT; 7	FUJ; 17	AUT; 4	SUZ; 12			9th	41
2006	Mazda RX-7	Y	GT300	7	(Japan) Hiroyuki Iiri (Japan) Tetsuya Yamano (Japan) Shinichi Yamaji	SUZ; 2	OKA	FUJ; 11	SEP; 1	SUG; 9	SUZ; 4	MOT; 4	AUT; 2	FUJ; 6		1st	78
2007	Mazda RX-7	Y	GT300	7	(Japan) Hiroyuki Iiri (Japan) Ryo Orime (Japan) Naoya Yamano	SUZ; 9	OKA; 12	FUJ; 8	SEP; 8	SUG; 8	SUZ; 11	MOT; 8	AUT; Ret	FUJ; 12		14th	32
2008	Mazda RX-7	Y	GT300	7	(Japan) Hiroyuki Iiri (Japan) Ryo Orime (Japan) Hiroyuki Matsumura	SUZ; 1	OKA; 14	FUJ; 19	SEP; 3	SUG; 4	SUZ; 3	MOT; 13	AUT; 20	FUJ; Ret		7th	66
2009	Mazda RX-7	Y	GT300	7	(Japan) Nobuteru Taniguchi (Japan) Ryo Orime	OKA; 3	SUZ; 2	FUJ; 3	SEP; 3	SUG; 11	SUZ; 7	FUJ; DNS	AUT; 2	MOT; 2		2nd	106
2010	Mazda RX-7	Y	GT300	7	(Japan) Ryo Orime (Japan) Nobuteru Taniguchi	SUZ; 1	OKA; 18	FUJ; 11	SEP; 1	SUG; 7	SUZ; 6	FUJ; C	MOT; 8	NC1; 4	NC2; 6	3rd	71

Note: Non-championship races (NC1, NC2) are major championship races that did not count towards the championship.
