= Shinichi Yamaji =

Japanese racing driver

- Nationality: Japanese
- Born: May 5, 1964 Noda, Chiba, Japan
- Died: May 26, 2014 (aged 50) Nagaizumi, Shizuoka, Japan

Japanese Grand Touring Championship
- Years active: 1986–2011
- Teams: YOURS Sports

Previous series
- 1994: All Japan GT Championship

Championship titles
- 1986: Fuji Freshman Race Series

Shinichi Yamaji (山路 慎一, Yamaji Shin'ichi; May 5, 1964 – May 26, 2014) was a Japanese race car driver. He formerly raced in the Japanese Grand Touring Championship, currently known as Super GT.

Yamaji's race debut was in 1986. He competed for YOURS Sports in the RX-7 at the JSS race at Fuji. He went on to take the championship in the RX-7 class of the Fuji Freshman Race series and from 1994 moved up to the All Japan GT Championship. He is widely remembered for an incident that occurred at the start of the 1998 race at Fuji in which, following a serious accident that resulted in an outbreak of fire, he rushed over to the stricken car and frantically worked to extinguish the engulfing flames. Thanks to his heroic efforts the driver, Tetsuya Ota, was able to escape with his life. In recent years, he served as the Clerk of the Course at various events such as Fuji Speedway races and the D1 Grand Prix. In 2011, he retired from Super GT300. On May 25, 2014, he checked into a hospital due to a worsening illness and died the next day.

== Complete JGTC/Super GT Results ==
(key) (Races in bold indicate pole position) (Races in italics indicate fastest lap)

Year	Team	Car	Class	1	2	3	4	5	6	7	8	9	DC	Pts
1994	Racing Team Nakaharu	Nissan Skyline GT-R	GT1	FUJ; 2	SEN; 4	FUJ; 5	SUG; 5	MIN; 6					3rd	47
1996	RE Amemiya	Mazda RX-7	GT300	SUZ; Ret	FUJ; 9	SEN; 3	FUJ; 3	SUG; 5	MIN; 6				6th	40
1997	RE Amemiya	Mazda RX-7	GT300	SUZ; Ret	FUJ; 3	SEN; 5	FUJ; Ret	MIN; 10	SUG; 4				8th	31
1998	RE Amemiya	Mazda RX-7	GT300	SUZ; Ret	FUJ; C	SEN; 3	FUJ; 5	MOT; Ret	MIN; 9	SUG; 6			10th	28
1999	Matsumotokiyoshi Team Tom's	Toyota Supra	GT500	SUZ; 13	FUJ; Ret	SUG; 2	MIN; 14	FUJ; 13	TAI; 6	MOT; 6			16th	27
2000	MatsumotoKiyoshi Team Tom's	Toyota Supra	GT500	MOT; 12	FUJ; Ret	SUG; 3	FUJ; 13	TAI; 9	MIN; Ret	SUZ; 7			14th	18
2001	TOMs Racing Team	Toyota Supra	GT500	TAI; 5	FUJ; 9	SUG; 1	FUJ; 10	MOT; 8	SUZ; 4	MIN; 9			6th	46
2002	Tsuchiya Engineering	Toyota Supra	GT500	TAI; 6	FUJ; 13	SUG; 11	SEP; Ret	FUJ; 3	MOT; 9	MIN; 5	SUZ; 7		15th	32
2003	Team Taisan Advan	Porsche 996 GT3 R	GT300	TAI; 2	FUJ; 1	SUG; 8	FUJ; 6	FUJ; 4	MOT; Ret	AUT; 3	SUZ; 9		3rd	72
2004	RE Amemiya	Mazda RX-7	GT300	TAI; 11	SUG; 4	SEP; 1	TOK; 10	MOT; Ret	AUT; 1	SUZ; 18			4th	55
2005	RE Amemiya	Mazda RX-7	GT300	OKA; 2	FUJ; Ret	SEP; 8	SUG; 4	MOT; 7	FUJ; 17	AUT; 4	SUZ; 12		9th	41
2006	Team Taisan Advan	Porsche 996 GT3 RSR	GT300	SUZ	OKA; 8	FUJ; 7	SEP	SUG				FUJ; 8	18th	16
2006	RE Amemiya	Mazda RX-7	GT300						SUZ; 4				18th	16
2006	910 Racing with Team Ishimatsu	Porsche 996 GT3 R	GT300							MOT; 14	AUT		18th	16
2007	Taisan with Nishizawa	Porsche 996 GT3 RS	GT300	SUZ; 11	OKA; 3	FUJ; 21	SEP	SUG	SUZ	MOT	AUT	FUJ	21st	12
2008	Taisan with Nishizawa	Porsche 911 GT3 RS	GT300	SUZ; 3	OKA; 2	FUJ; Ret	SEP; 15	SUG; 7	SUZ; 5	**MOT**; 4	AUT; 15	FUJ	8th	51
2011	Team Taisan Cinecitta	Ferrari F430	GT300	OKA; 9	FUJ; 9	SEP	SUG; 12	SUZ; 17	FUJ; 21	AUT	MOT; Ret		18th	4
