= Naohiro Furuya =

Japanese racing driver

Naohiro Furuya (古谷 直広, Naohiro Furuya; born July 30, 1963, in Urawa, Saitama Prefecture) is a Japanese racing driver.

== Career ==
Furuya was active in automobile racing. He has competed in the Italian Formula 3 Championship, the Italian Touring Car Championship and in Formula 3 races at the Macau Grand Prix and the Monaco Grand Prix. He came second at the Japanese Formula 3 Championship, after Naoki Hattori. In the following year, Furuya joined Japan's top formula and raced until 1995. From 2003 to 2010, he also took part in the Japanese Super-Endurance (Super Taikyu Series) taking eight wins in total and six pole positions, with a best finish of third in the championship. He also participated in the All Japan GT Championship race until 2010.
