= Tarzan Yamada =

Japanese racecar driver

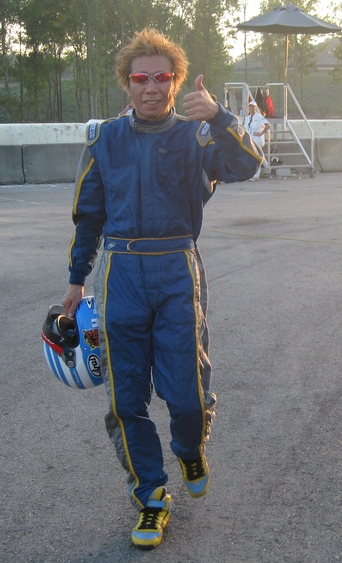
Yamada at Virginia International Raceway in 2007

Eiji "Tarzan" Yamada (山田 英二, Yamada Eiji; 25 April 1962) is a Japanese time attack driver. He is currently a judge at American Formula D events. Yamada has raced in both the JGTC and Japanese Touring Car Championship.

Yamada gained popularity on several Japanese videos with BAKA-MON, his trademarked logo that translates loosely as "stupid monkey." Players of the Juiced 2: Hot Import Nights video game need to compete against a representation of Yamada to advance in the game. Before that, he was a regular feature on Video Option.

Yamada has raced in numerous series in Japan and America since 1981. His championships include the 1991 Formula Mirage class and 2002 N1 Super Taikyu endurance.

Yamada, competing in the Cyber Evo, is a two-time World Time Attack Challenge champion (2010, 2011) in the event held annually in Sydney, Australia.

== Racing record ==
=== Complete Japanese Formula 3 results ===
(key) (Races in bold indicate pole position) (Races in italics indicate fastest lap)

Year	Team	Engine	1	2	3	4	5	6	7	8	9	10	DC	Pts
1983	？	Toyota	SUZ; 4	NIS	SUG	SUZ; 5	TSU	SUZ; 7	SUZ				6th	18
1984	Seto Love Racing	Toyota	**SUZ**; 2	NIS	FUJ; 13	**SUZ**; 1	TSU; 8	**SUZ**; 1	TSU; 5	**SUZ**; 5			2nd	74
1985	Tomei Sports	Nissan	SUZ	FUJ; 8	SUZ; 10	TSU; 6	NIS; 11	SUZ; Ret	SUZ; Ret				13th	10
1988	Hot Laps	VW	SUZ; Ret	TSU; 18	FUJ	SUZ	SUG	TSU	SEN	SUZ	NIS	SUZ	NC	0
1992	Will Racing Co., Ltd.	Toyota	SUZ	TSU	FUJ	SUZ	SEN	TAI	MIN	SUG	SUZ; DNQ		NC	0

=== Japanese Touring Car Championship (-1993) Class results ===
Year	Team	Car	Class	1	2	3	4	5	6	DC	Pts
1991	Nismo	Nissan Skyline GT-R	JTC-1	SUG	SUZ	TSU; 6	SEN; 4	AUT	FUJ	10th	26

=== Super Taikyu Series Class results ===
(key) (Races in bold indicate pole position) (Races in italics indicate fastest lap)

Year	Team	Class	Co-Drivers	Car	1	2	3	4	5	6	7	8	DC	Pts
1992	Team Zexel	1	(Japan) Takayuki Kinoshita	Nissan Skyline GT-R	SEN; 4	FUJ; 2	TAI; 4	TSU; 2	MIN; 2	SUG; 2			？	？
1993	Team Zexel	1	(Japan) Takayuki Kinoshita	Nissan Skyline GT-R	TAI; 2	SEN; 2	SUZ; 1	FUJ; 7	TOK; 4	TSU; 2	MIN; 5	SUG; 7	？	？
1994	Prince Tokyo Fujitsubo	1	(Japan) Takayuki Kinoshita (Japan) Tomohiko Sunako	Nissan Skyline GT-R	MIN	SUZ	SEN	FUJ	TAI	TOK; 9	TSU	SUG	？	？
1998	Manpukudō	1	(Japan) Takayuki Kinoshita(Rd.2) (Japan) Takayuki Aoki(Rd.3,4)	Nissan Skyline GT-R	MIN	SUG; NC	SUZ; 4	TAI; Ret	TOK	SEN	MOT	FUJ	？	？
1999	Prince Tokyo Fujitsubo	1	(Japan) Tomohiko Sunako (Japan) Shinichi Katura(Rd.5)	Nissan Skyline GT-R	MIN; 1	SEN; 3	SUZ; Ret	TAI; 1	TOK; Ret	MOT; 4	FUJ; 2	SUG; 1	2nd	？
2000	Totomu Fujitsubo	1	(Japan) Tomohiko Sunako (Japan) Shinichi Katura(Rd.5)	Nissan Skyline GT-R	MIN; 3	SEN; 3	SUZ; 3	TAI; 3	TOK; 3	MOT; 3	FUJ; Ret	SUG; 4	3rd	？
2001	Totomu Fujitsubo	1	(Japan) Tomohiko Sunako (Japan) Hisashi Wada(Rd.5)	Nissan Skyline GT-R	MIN; 1	SEN; 2	SUZ; 1	MOT; 2	TOK; 5	TAI; 2	SUG; 2	FUJ; 1	2nd	？
2002	C-West Advan	3	(Japan) Naofumi Omoto (Japan) Masaaki Nagashima	Mazda RX-7	MIN; Ret	SEN; 1	SUZ; 1	MOT; 3	TOK; 1	TAI; 3	SUG	FUJ; Ret	1st	？

=== Complete JGTC/Super GT Results ===
(key) (Races in bold indicate pole position) (Races in italics indicate fastest lap)

Year	Team	Car	Class	1	2	3	4	5	6	7	8	9	DC	Pts
1994	Johnson Nismo	Nissan Skyline GT-R	GT1	FUJ; Ret	SEN; 5	FUJ	SUG	MIN					18th	8
1995	Team Comtech Racing Club	Porsche 911 GT2	GT1	SUZ	FUJ	SEN	FUJ; 15	SUG	MIN				NC	0
1996	Prova Motorsport	Porsche 911 GT2	GT500	SUZ	FUJ	SEN	FUJ	SUG; 11	MIN				NC	0
2000	Auto Staff Racing	Nissan Silvia	GT300	MOT	FUJ; Ret	SUG; 8							26th	4
2000	Team Taisan Advan	Dodge Viper GTS-R	GT500				FUJ; 18	TAI					NC	0
2000	Team Taisan Advan	Dodge Viper GTS-R	GT300						MIN; 10	SUZ; 15			26th	4
2001	Team Taisan Advan Jr.	Dodge Viper GTS-R	GT300	TAI; 8	FUJ; 9	SUG	FUJ; 9	MOT; 14	SUZ	MIN; 3			15th	19
2002	Team Taisan Advan Jr.	Dodge Viper GTS-R	GT300	TAI; 10	FUJ; 16	SUG; 5	SEP; 9	FUJ; 8	MOT; 9	MIN; 4	SUZ; 21		14th	26
2003	Team Taisan Advan	Dodge Viper GTS-R	GT300	TAI; 16	FUJ; 16	SUG; Ret	FUJ; 1	FUJ; 5	MOT; Ret	AUT; 7	SUZ; Ret		12th	34
2005	A&S Racing	Mosler MT900R	GT300	OKA; 16	FUJ; 15	SEP; Ret	SUG; 14		FUJ; 11	AUT; 13	SUZ		NC	0
2005	A&S Racing	Chevrolet Corvette	GT300					MOT; 22					NC	0
2006	JIM Gainer	Ferrari 360 modena	GT300	SUZ	OKA	FUJ	SEP	SUG	SUZ; Ret	MOT	AUT	FUJ	NC	0

=== Complete Japanese Formula 3000 results ===
(key) (Races in bold indicate pole position; races in italics indicate fastest lap)

Year	Entrant	1	2	3	4	5	6	7	8	9	10	DC	Pts
1994	Team Glory With Nova	SUZ	FUJ	MIN	SUZ	SUG	FUJ	SUZ	FUJ	FUJ; 17	SUZ	NC	0
