= Team Taisan =

Racing team

(Japan) Team Taisan
- Founded: October 1983
- Founder(s): Yasutsune Chiba
- Base: Fukushima Prefecture, Japan
- Team principal(s): Yasunori Chiba
- Current series: All Japan EV-GP Series
- Former series: Fuji Long Distance Series, All-Japan Sports Prototype Championship, Japanese Touring Car Championship, Asian Le Mans Series, Super GT Series
- Current drivers: (Japan) Shinnosuke Yamada (Japan) Shintaro Kawabata
- Teams' Championships: JGTC GT500: 1995; JGTC/Super GT GT300: 1996, 1998, 2000–2003, 2012; GP-EV: 2011; ALMS LMGTE: 2013
- Drivers' Championships: JTCC JTC-2: 1989; JGTC/Super GT GT300: 1996, 1998, 2000, 2012; ALMS LMGTE: 2013

Team Taisan (チーム・タイサン, Chīmu Taisan; stylized as Team TAISAN) is a Japanese auto racing team founded in 1983 by Yasutsune "Ricky" Chiba (3 April 1945 - 7 June 2024) and owned by the Taisan Industrial Company. Most active in the Super GT Series, formerly known as the All Japan Grand Touring Car Championship (JGTC), Taisan has been involved in all but one season from 1994 to 2018, taking a sabbatical in 2015. During that time they have won eight team championships and four drivers championships, representing manufacturers Ferrari, Porsche, Dodge, Toyota, Nissan, and Audi. Team Taisan has also participated in the 24 Hours of Le Mans, winning their class on their debut in 2000. For nearly their entire career, Taisan has been sponsored by tire manufacturer Yokohama Rubber Company, often carrying the name of Yokohama's Advan brand.

== History ==
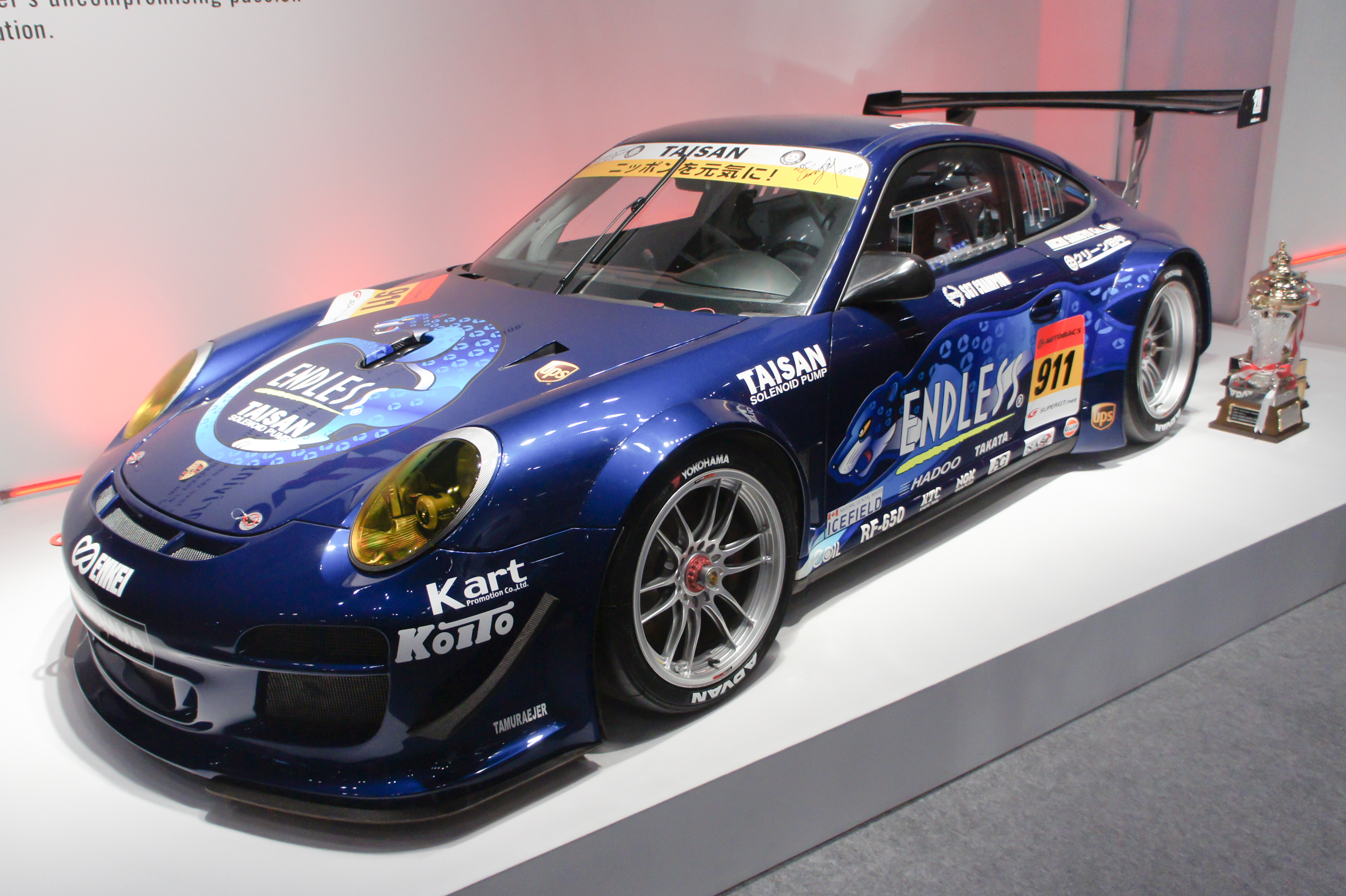
The Team Taisan Endless Porsche which won the 2012 GT300 Drivers and Teams Championships

The team was initially formed through Nova Engineering and their efforts in the All Japan Endurance Championship and Fuji Long Distance Series. Taisan operated one of the teams' Porsche 962C with drivers Kunimitsu Takahashi and Kenji Takahashi. Kunimitsu went on to win the Endurance Championship three times from 1985 to 1987, while Nova Engineering won the team championships in the Fuji Long Distance Series those same years. Taisan expanded their program to include the Japanese Touring Car Championship in 1989 with BMW M3s, adding Briton Will Hoy to the team in 1990. A Group A category Nissan Skyline GT-R was added to the team in 1991 for Kenji Takahashi and Keiichi Tsuchiya while their BMWs continued in the lower JTC-2 category. Kunimitsu replaced Kenji in the Skyline for 1992 and 1993 before Kunimitsu and Tsuchiya left to form their own racing team and the JTCC eliminated the Group A cars from the series, leaving the team with a single Super Touring BMW for Kazuo Mogi in 1994.

Taisan returned to sports car racing in 1994 in the new All Japan Grand Touring Car Championship, the team participating with one of their former 962Cs and teamed alongside a Ferrari F40. Masahiko Kondo and Anthony Reid won one race for the Porsche while Tetsuya Ota and Oscar Larrauri earned one victory in the Ferrari. A switch to a pair of Porsche 911 GT2s earned three GT1 victories in 1995 and the teams championship for the GT1 category, while the team also added a GT2 class campaign under the Team Taisan Jr. moniker for a Porsche 964. Taisan Jr. became a dominant team in the rechristened GT300 class, winning the drivers and teams championships in 1996, followed by second place in 1997 and another championship in 1998 while campaigning a new Toyota MR2 in cooperation with Tsuchiya Engineering.

=== Taisan International ===
Taisan's success led to the team being invited to participate in the 24 Hours of Le Mans in 2000 for the LMGT category. Their Porsche 911 GT3-R, driven by Hideo Fukuyama, Atsushi Yogo, and Bruno Lambert won the category by a six-lap margin. Upon returning to Japan, Taisan began a streak of four consecutive GT300 team championships from 2000–2003, including a drivers championship with Fukuyama in 2000. Another Le Mans also earned the team a podium finish in their class for 2002. Taisan downsized to a single Porsche team from 2004 onward as the JGTC transitioned to the new Super GT Series; Taisan eventually joined with Endless for a joint program that earned them another drivers and teams championships in 2012. The team expanded once again in 2013, retaining the Porsche in Super GT while joining the new Asian Le Mans Series with a Ferrari 458 Italia GT2, winning the series championship and earning the team an automatic invitation to Le Mans, their first since 2006. A difficult 2014 season with a new Nissan GT-R led Taisan to take a sabbatical year from Super GT, returning in 2016 with an Audi R8 LMS in cooperation with SARD.

=== Taisan Electric ===
Team Taisan also began to embrace electric motorsport by participating in the All Japan EV-GP Series in 2011 with Tesla Roadsters as well as a modified Porsche 914, winning the 2011 championship. The team also began developing electric karts. In 2018 Chiba announced an auction of many former Taisan racing cars dating back to the early 1990s, including several JGTC and Super GT machines. Chiba also announced at the conclusion of the 2018 Super GT season that the team would cease participation in Super GT, instead concentrating solely on electric motorsports.

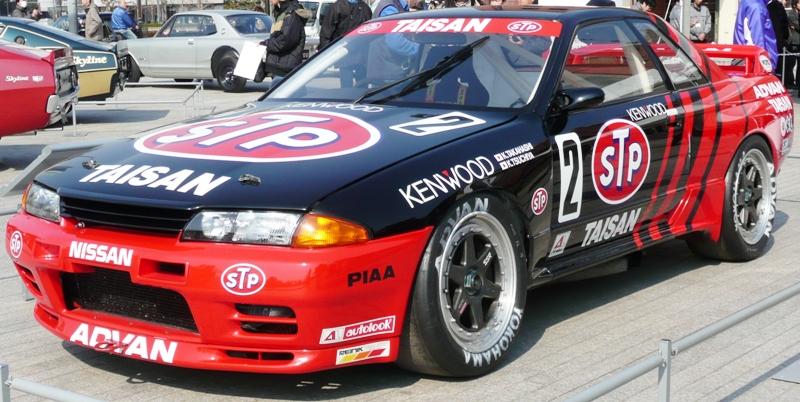
1991 Nissan Skyline GT-R Group A

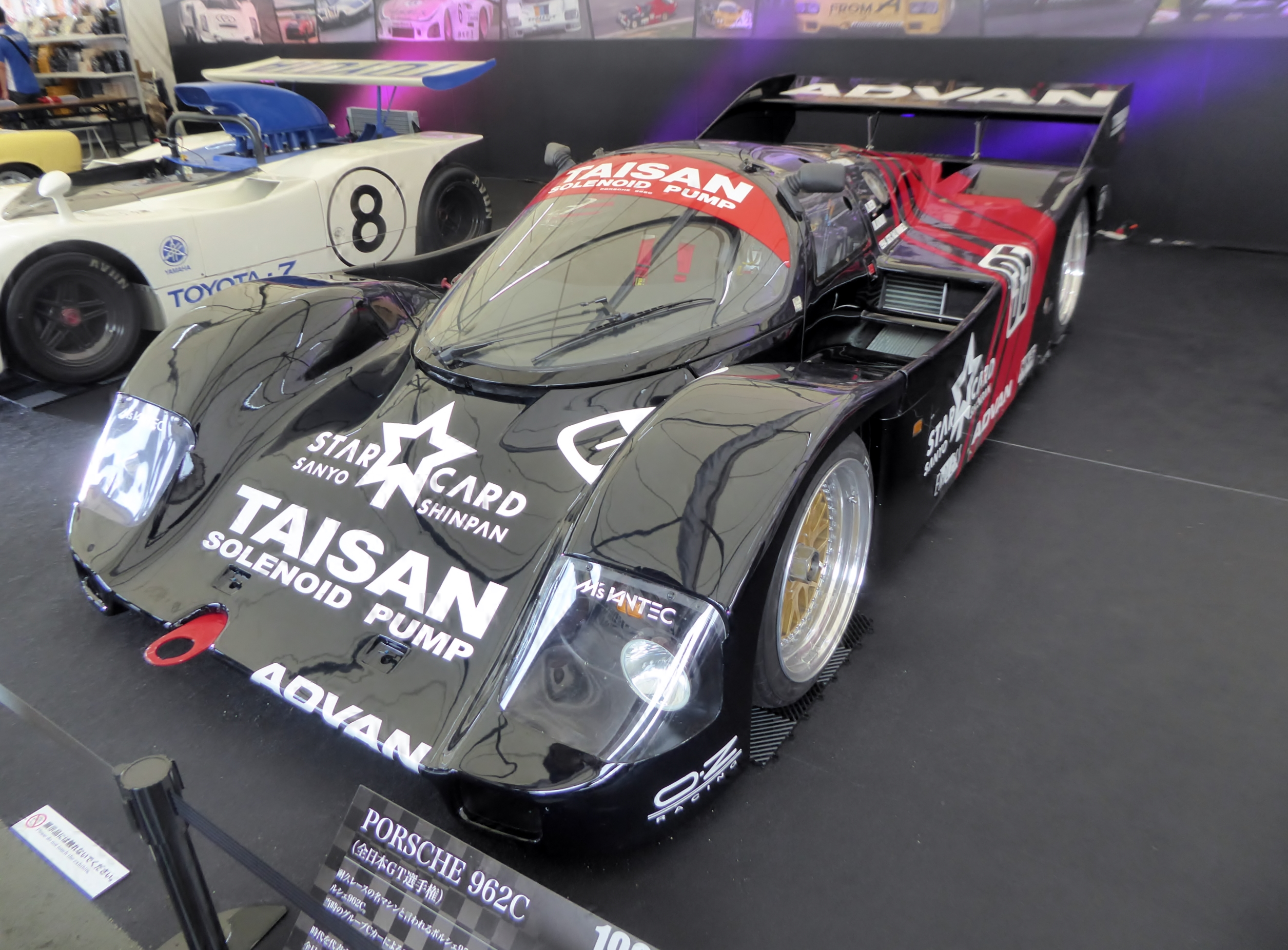
1994 Porsche 962C

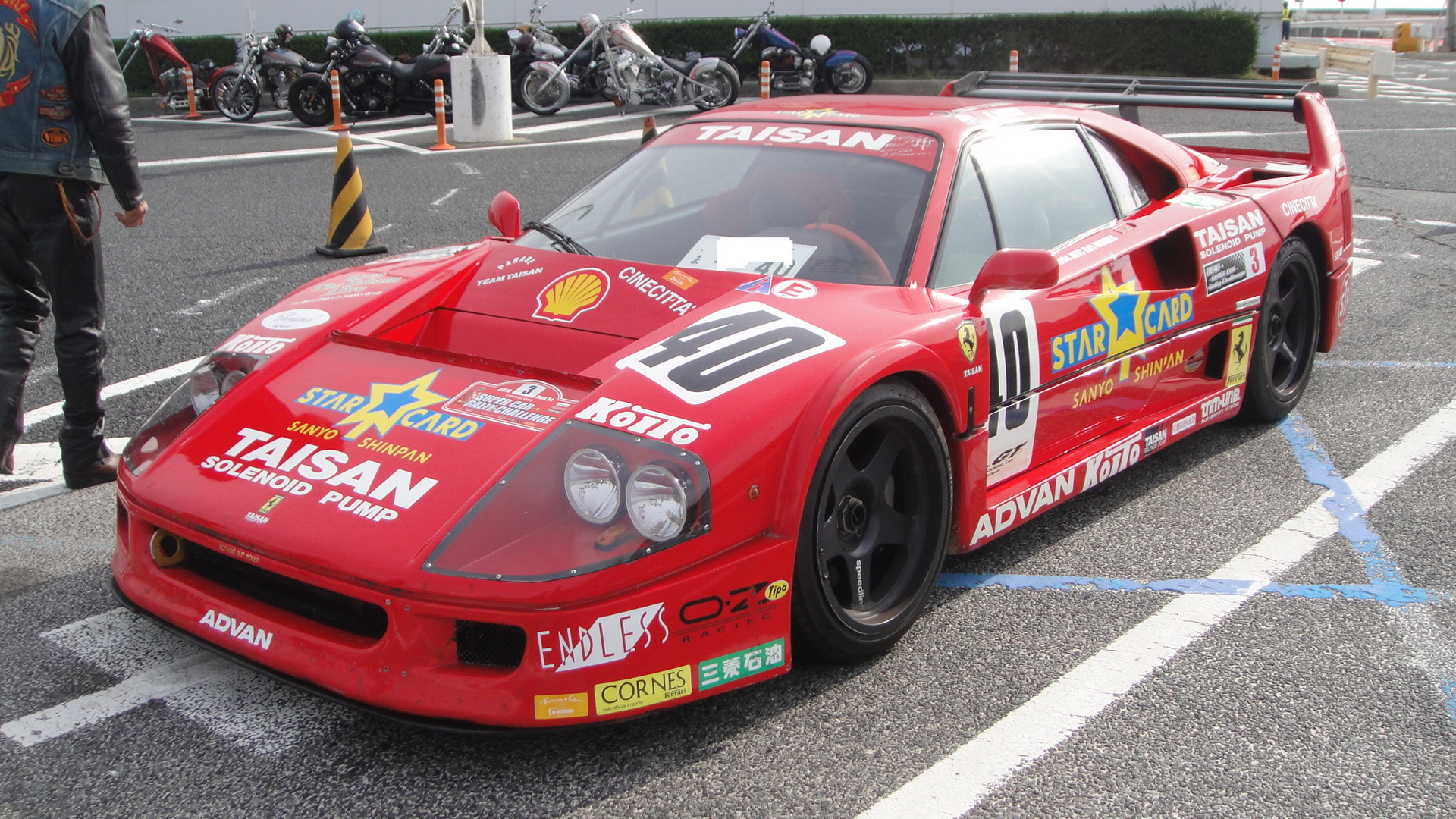
1994 Ferrari F40

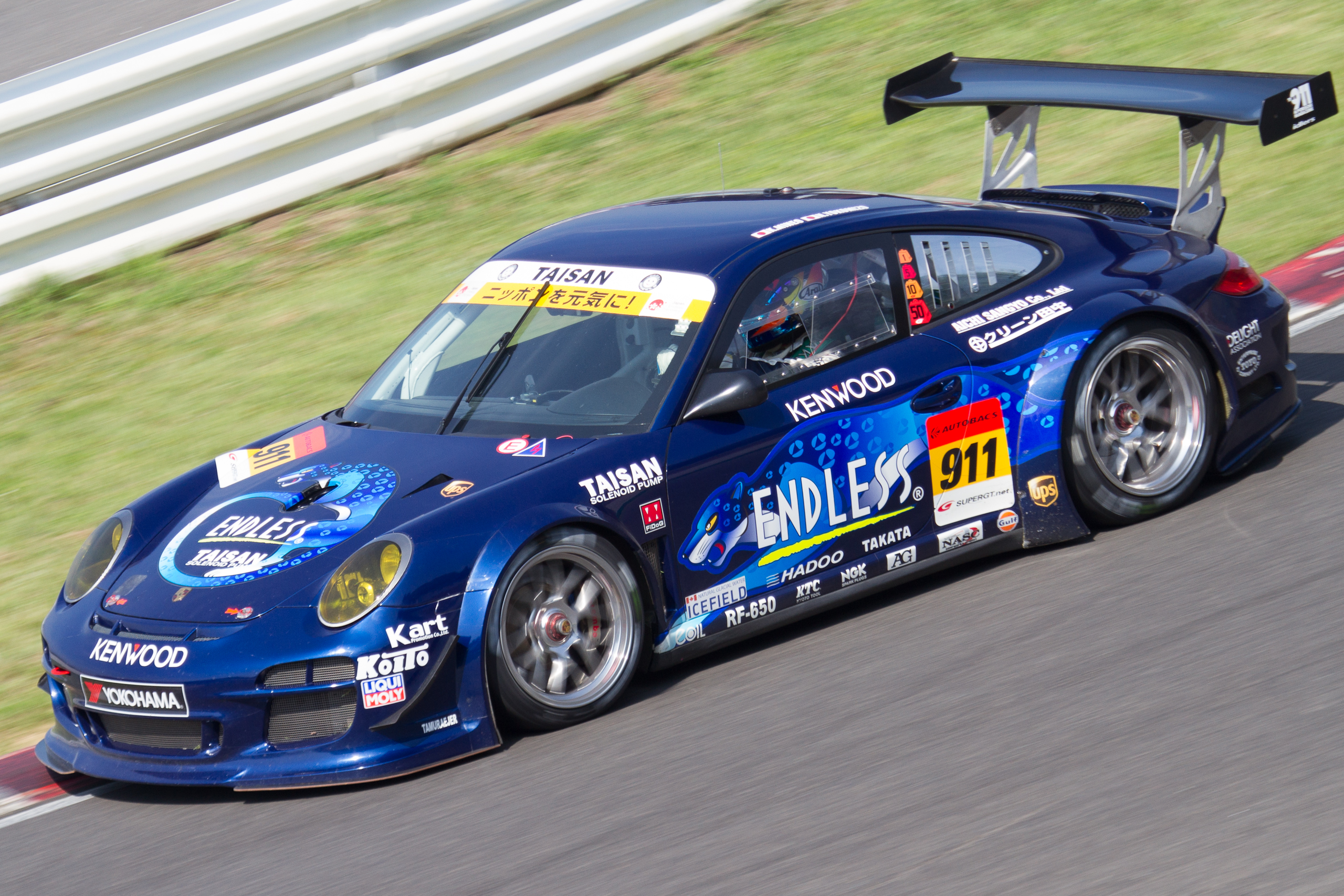
2012 Porsche 911 GT3 R

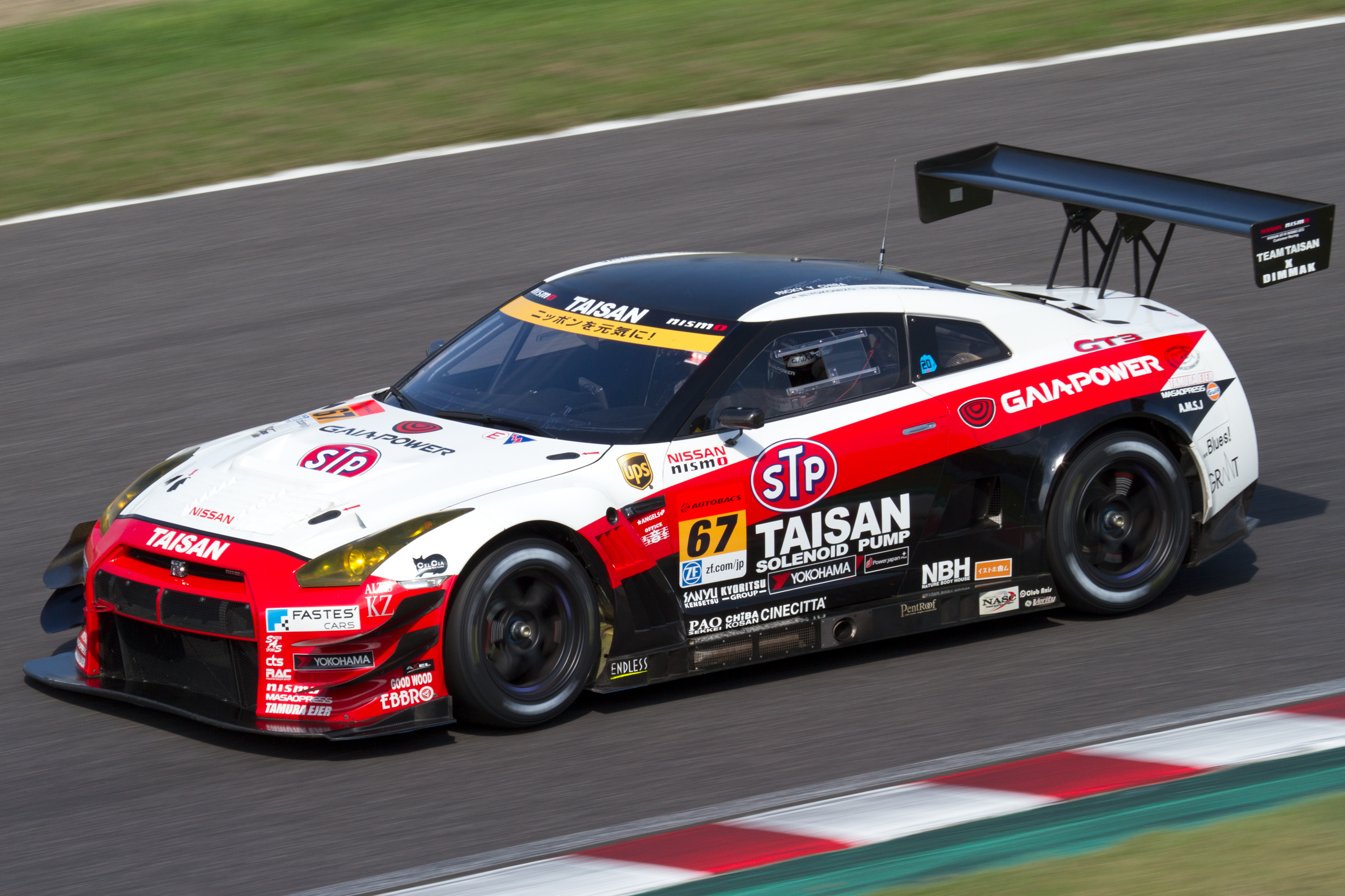
2014 Nissan GT-R GT3

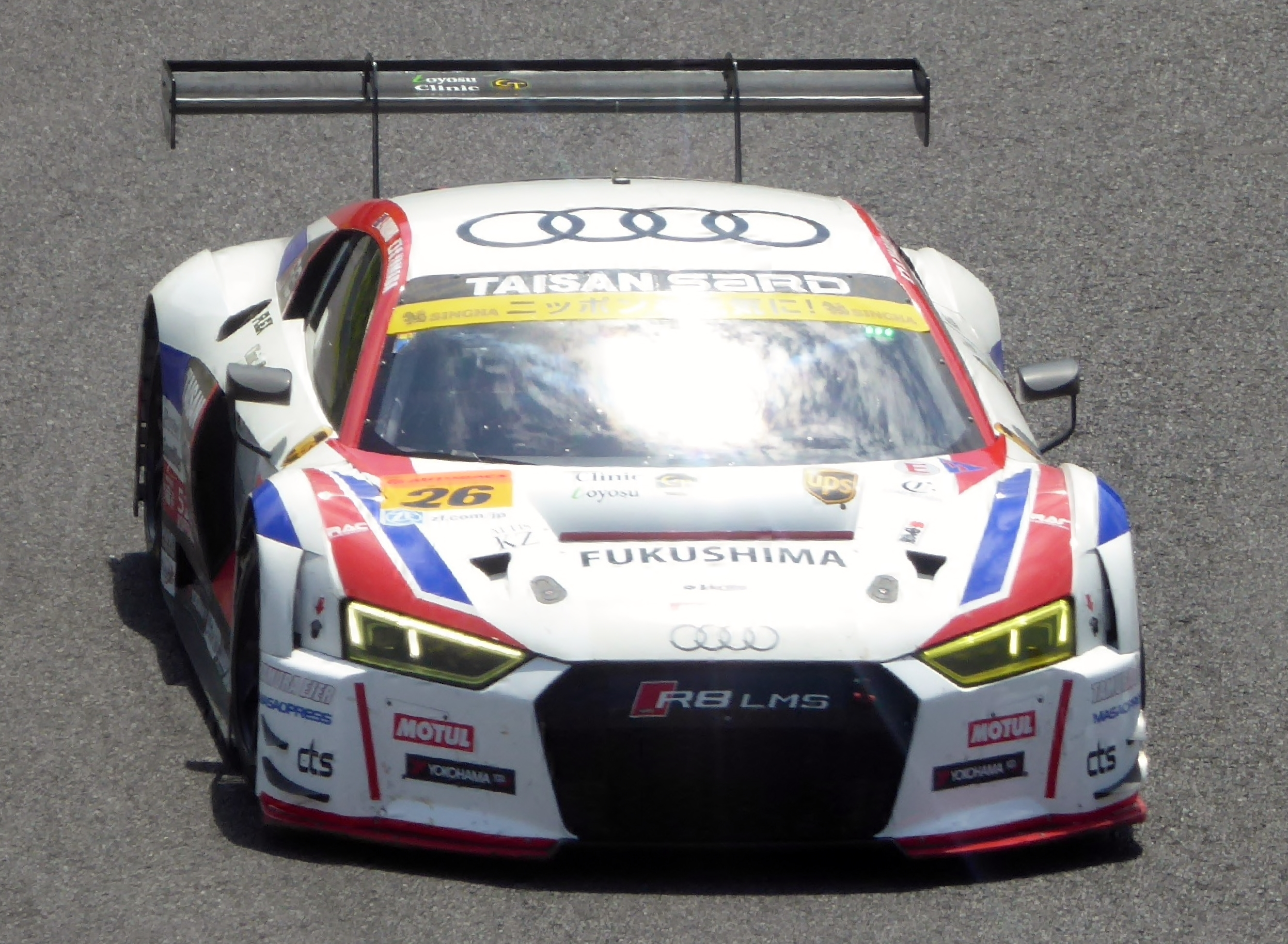
2017 Audi R8 LMS

== Complete race results ==
=== Complete 24 Hours of Le Mans Results ===
Year	Class	No.	Drivers	Car	Tyres	Laps	Pos.	Class Pos.
2000	GT	73	(Japan) Hideo Fukuyama (Japan) Atsushi Yogō (Belgium) Bruno Lambert	Porsche 911 GT3-R	Y	310	16th	1st
2001	GT	73	(Japan) Hideo Fukuyama (Japan) Atsushi Yogō (Japan) Kazuyuki Nishikawa	Porsche 911 GT3 RS (996)	Y	273	11th	5th
2002	GT	73	(Japan) Atsushi Yogō (Japan) Akira Iida (Japan) Kazuyuki Nishizawa	Porsche 911 GT3 RS (996)	Y	316	21st	3rd
2003	GT	77	(Japan) Atsushi Yogō (Japan) Akira Iida (Japan) Kazuyoshi Nishizawa	Porsche 911 GT3 RS (996)	Y	304	19th	4th
2006	GT2	93	(Japan) Kazuyuki Nishizawa (Japan) Shinichi Yamaji (United States) Philip Collin	Porsche 911 GT3 RS (996)	Y	291	22nd	5th
2014	LMGTE Am	70	(Japan) Shinji Nakano (United Kingdom) Martin Rich (Germany) Pierre Ehret	Ferrari 458 Italia GT2	M	327	28th	9th

=== Complete JGTC Results ===
(key) (Races in bold indicate pole position) (Races in italics indicate fastest lap)

Year	Car	Tyres	Class	No.	Drivers	1	2	3	4	5	6	7	8	9	Pos	Pts
1994	Ferrari F40 LM	Y	GT1	34	(Japan) Keiichi Suzuki (Japan) Hideshi Matsuda	FUJ	SEN	FUJ	SUG	MIN; 8					2nd	64
1994	Porsche 962C	Y	GT1	35	(United Kingdom) Anthony Reid (Japan) Kazuo Mogi (Japan) Masahiko Kondo	**FUJ**; NC	SEN	**FUJ**; 1	SUG	MIN; 3					2nd	64
1994	Ferrari F40 LM	Y	GT1	40	(Japan) Tetsuya Ota (Japan) Keiichi Suzuki (United Kingdom) Anthony Reid (Argentina) Oscar Larrauri	FUJ; 3	SEN; 3	FUJ; 3	SUG; Ret	**MIN**; 1					2nd	64
1995	BMW M3 (E30)	Y	GT2	26	(Japan) Motoji Sekine (Japan) Fumio Mutoh (Japan) Junichi Yamanashi (Japan) Masaoki Nagashima	SUZ; 4	FUJ; 11	SEN; 6	FUJ; 5	SUG; 5	MIN; Ret				5th	44
1995	BMW M3 (E30)	Y	GT2	28	(Japan) Motoji Sekine (Japan) Fumio Mutoh	SUZ	FUJ	SEN	FUJ; Ret	SUG; 4	MIN; 4				5th	44
1995	Porsche 911 GT2	Y	GT1	33	(Japan) Hideshi Matsuda (Japan) Kaoru Iida (Japan) Keiichi Suzuki	SUZ	FUJ; 1	SEN; 8	FUJ; Ret	SUG	MIN				1st	80
1995	Ferrari F40 LM	Y	GT1	34	(United Kingdom) Anthony Reid (Japan) Masahiko Kondo (Japan) Hideshi Matsuda (Japan) Takeshi Tsuchiya (Argentina) Oscar Larrauri (Japan) Keiichi Suzuki	SUZ; 11	FUJ; Ret	SEN; 3	FUJ; 5	SUG; 6	MIN; 1				1st	80
1995	Porsche 911 GT2	Y	GT1	34	(United Kingdom) Anthony Reid (Japan) Masahiko Kondo (Japan) Hideshi Matsuda (Japan) Takeshi Tsuchiya (Argentina) Oscar Larrauri (Japan) Keiichi Suzuki	SUZ; 11	FUJ; Ret	SEN; 3	FUJ; 5	SUG; 6	MIN; 1				1st	80
1995	Porsche 911 GT2	Y	GT1	35	(Japan) Keiichi Suzuki (Japan) Hideshi Matsuda (Japan) Takeshi Tsuchiya (United Kingdom) Anthony Reid (Japan) Masahiko Kondo	SUZ; Ret	FUJ; 7	SEN	FUJ; 9	SUG; 1	MIN; 9				1st	80
1995	Ferrari F40 LM	Y	GT1	40	(Argentina) Oscar Larrauri (Japan) Tetsuya Ota	SUZ; Ret	FUJ; 9	SEN	**FUJ**; 18	SUG	MIN; 12				1st	80
1996	Porsche 964 RSR	Y	GT300	26	(Japan) Keiichi Suzuki (Japan) Morio Nitta	**SUZ**; 1	FUJ; 2	SEN; Ret	FUJ; 2	SUG; 1	MIN; 1	NC1; 3			**1st**	**93**
1996	BMW M3 (E30)	Y	GT300	28	(Japan) Masaoki Nagashima (Japan) Junichi Yamanashi (Japan) Manabu Orido (Japan) Takeshi Tsuchiya	SUZ; 12	FUJ	SEN	FUJ						**1st**	**93**
1996	Toyota MR2	Y	GT300	28	(Japan) Masaoki Nagashima (Japan) Junichi Yamanashi (Japan) Manabu Orido (Japan) Takeshi Tsuchiya					SUG; 4	MIN; DNA	NC1			**1st**	**93**
1996	Porsche 993 RSR	Y	GT300	38	(Hong Kong) Adrian Fu (Australia) Rodney Jones (Japan) Masaoki Nagashima	SUZ; 9	FUJ; DNA	SEN; 8	FUJ; 12	SUG; DNA	MIN; 8	NC1			**1st**	**93**
1996	Porsche 993 GT2	Y	GT500	34	(Japan) Hideshi Matsuda (Japan) Osamu Nakako	SUZ; 9	FUJ; 9	SEN; Ret	FUJ; 12	SUG; 12	MIN; 6	NC1; 8			8th	12
1996	Porsche 993 GT2	Y	GT500	35	(Japan) Takeshi Tsuchiya (United Kingdom) Anthony Reid (Argentina) Oscar Larrauri (Japan) Mitsuhiro Kinoshita	SUZ; 12	FUJ; 7	SEN; Ret	FUJ; DNS	SUG; 15	MIN; Ret	NC1			8th	12
1997	Porsche 993 RSR	Y	GT300	26	(Japan) Keiichi Suzuki (Japan) Morio Nitta	**SUZ**; 4	FUJ; 1	SEN; 3	FUJ; 1	MIN; 3	SUG; 2	NC1; DNS	NC2; DNS		**2nd**	**89**
1997	Porsche 993 GT2	Y	GT500	34	(Japan) Keiichi Tsuchiya (Japan) Hideshi Matsuda	SUZ	FUJ	SEN; 10	FUJ; Ret						13th	4
1997	Chrysler Viper GTS-R	Y	GT500	34	(Japan) Keiichi Tsuchiya (Japan) Hideshi Matsuda					MIN; 14	SUG; 8	NC1; 6	NC2; Ret		13th	4
1998	Toyota MR2	Y	GT300	25	(Japan) Keiichi Suzuki (Japan) Shingo Tachi	SUZ; 1	FUJ; C	SEN; 1	**FUJ**; 1	MOT; 6	MIN; 1	**SUG**; 1	**NC1**; 1		**1st**	**106**
1998	Chrysler Viper GTS-R	Y	GT500	55	(Japan) Hideshi Matsuda (Japan) Eiichi Tajima (Japan) Fuminori Mizuno (United Kingdom) Anthony Reid (Japan) Mitsuhiro Kinoshita	SUZ; 14	FUJ; C	SEN	FUJ; 14	MOT	MIN; DNA	SUG; 10	NC1; 8		17th	1
1999	Porsche 993 GT3-R	Y	GT300	26	(Japan) Hiroaki Suga (Sri Lanka) Dilantha Malagamuwa (Germany) Dominik Schwager (Japan) Hideshi Matsuda (Japan) Tomohiko Sunako	SUZ; 5	FUJ; Ret	SUG; Ret	MIN; Ret						5th	48
1999	Porsche 996 GT3-R	Y	GT300	26	(Japan) Hiroaki Suga (Sri Lanka) Dilantha Malagamuwa (Germany) Dominik Schwager (Japan) Hideshi Matsuda (Japan) Tomohiko Sunako					FUJ; 1	OKA; Ret	MOT; 1	NC1; 7		5th	48
1999	Porsche 993 GT3-R	Y	GT300	55	(Japan) Hiroaki Suga (Japan) Eiichi Tajima					FUJ; 7	OKA; 6	MOT; 11			14th	10
1999	Chrysler Viper GTS-R	Y	GT500	55	(Japan) Eiichi Tajima (Japan) Hideshi Matsuda (Germany) Dominik Schwager (Japan) Yasuyuki Honjo	SUZ; 9	FUJ; 13	SUG; 15	MIN; 13				NC1; 10		13th	2
2000	Porsche 996 GT3-R	Y	GT300	26	(Japan) Hideshi Matsuda (Japan) Hideo Fukuyama (Japan) Fuminori Mizuno (Japan) Atsushi Yogo	**MOT**; 1	**FUJ**; 1	SUG; 9	NC1; 5	FUJ; 7	OKA; 7	MIN; 1	SUZ; 2		**1st**	**101**
2000	Porsche 996 GT3-R	Y	GT300	28	(Japan) Hiroaki Suga (Japan) Shinsuke Shibahara	MOT	FUJ	SUG; 10	NC1	FUJ; 1	OKA; 8	**MIN**; 3	SUZ; Ret		**1st**	**101**
2000	Chrysler Viper GTS-R	Y	GT300	55	(Japan) Hiroaki Suga (Japan) Shinsuke Shibahara (Japan) Eiji Yamada (Japan) Takahide Tasaki (Sri Lanka) Dilantha Malagamuwa							MIN; 10	SUZ; 15		17th	1
2000	Chrysler Viper GTS-R	Y	GT500	55	(Japan) Hiroaki Suga (Japan) Shinsuke Shibahara (Japan) Eiji Yamada (Japan) Takahide Tasaki (Sri Lanka) Dilantha Malagamuwa	MOT; 16	FUJ; Ret	SUG; DNA	NC1; Ret	FUJ; 18	OKA; DNA				NC	0
2001	Porsche 996 GT3-R	Y	GT300	24	(Japan) Hideshi Matsuda (Japan) Kazuyushi Nishizawa	OKA; 11	FUJ; 4	SUG; 5	NC1; 6	FUJ; 7	MOT; 3	SUZ; 16	MIN; 2		**1st**	**74**
2001	Porsche 996 GT3-R	Y	GT300	26	(Japan) Hideo Fukuyama (Japan) Atsushi Yogo	OKA; 4	FUJ; 17	SUG; 7	NC1; 4	FUJ; 13	MOT; 2	SUZ; 3	MIN; 8		**1st**	**74**
2001	Chrysler Viper GTS-R	Y	GT300	55	(Japan) Eiji Yamada (Japan) Takayuki Kinoshita	OKA; 8	FUJ; 9	SUG; DNA	NC1; 8	FUJ; 9	MOT; 14	SUZ; DNA	MIN; 3		12th	19
2002	Porsche 911 GT3-R	Y	GT300	24	(Japan) Hideo Fukuyama (Japan) Mitsuhiro Kinoshita	OKA; 2	FUJ; Ret	SUG; 16	SEP; 5	FUJ; 1	MOT; 7	MIN; Ret	SUZ; 2		**1st**	**102**
2002	Porsche 911 GT3-R	Y	GT300	26	(Japan) Atsushi Yogo (Japan) Kazuyushi Nishizawa (Japan) Takayuki Kinoshita	OKA; 5	FUJ; 3	SUG; 7	SEP; 10	FUJ; 7	MOT; 3	MIN; 3	SUZ; 17		**1st**	**102**
2002	Porsche 911 GT3-R	Y	GT300	28	(Japan) Yutaka Yamagishi (Japan) Yukihiro Hane (Japan) Sunako Jukuchō	OKA; 11	FUJ; 7	SUG; 6	SEP; 11	FUJ; 11	MOT; 17	MIN; Ret	SUZ; 8		9th	33
2002	Chrysler Viper GTS-R	Y	GT300	55	(Japan) Eiji Yamada (Japan) Takashi Shimizu (Japan) Takayuki Kinoshita	OKA; 10	FUJ; 16	SUG; 5	SEP; 9	FUJ; 8	MOT; 9	MIN; 4	SUZ; 21		9th	33
2003	Porsche 911 GT3-R	Y	GT300	24	(Japan) Akihiro Asai (Japan) Atsushi Yogo (United Kingdom) Adam Wilcox	**OKA**; 1	FUJ; 11	SUG; 13	FUJ; 8	FUJ; 10	MOT; 18	AUT; 8	SUZ; 5		9th	38
2003	Porsche 911 GT3-R	Y	GT300	26	(Japan) Shinichi Yamaji (Japan) Kazuyushi Nishizawa	OKA; 2	FUJ; 1	SUG; 8	FUJ; 6	FUJ; 4	MOT; Ret	AUT; 3	SUZ; 9		**1st**	**88**
2003	Dodge Viper Competition Coupe	Y	GT300	55	(Japan) Eiji Yamada (Japan) Takayuki Kinoshita	OKA; 16	FUJ; 16	SUG; Ret	FUJ; 1	FUJ; 5	MOT; Ret	AUT; 7	SUZ; Ret		**1st**	**88**
2004	Porsche 911 GT3-R	Y	GT300	26	(Japan) Yutaka Yamagishi (Japan) Kaoru Ijiri (Japan) Akihiro Asai	OKA; 9	SUG; 10	SEP; Ret	TOK; 11	MOT; Ret	AUT; 13	SUZ; 8	NC1	NC2	14th	6
2004	Dodge Viper Competition Coupe	Y	GT300	55	(Japan) Eiji Yamada (Belgium) Patrick Van Schoot	OKA	SUG	SEP	TOK	MOT	AUT	SUZ	NC1; 9	NC2; 6	NC	0

=== Complete Super GT Results ===
(key) (Races in bold indicate pole position) (Races in italics indicate fastest lap)

Year	Car	Tyres	Class	No.	Drivers	1	2	3	4	5	6	7	8	9	10	Pos	Points
2005	Porsche 996 GT3-RS	Y	GT300	26	(Japan) Yutaka Yamagishi (Japan) Kaoru Ijiri (Japan) Takashi Inoue (Japan) Isao Ihashi	OKA; Ret	FUJ; 12	SEP; 16	SUG	MOT	FUJ	AUT	SUZ; 19			NC	0
2006	Porsche 996 GT3-RS	Y	GT300	26	(Japan) Kazuyuki Nishizawa (Japan) Shinichi Yamaji	SUZ	OKA; 8	FUJ; 7	SEP	SUG	SUZ	MOT	AUT	FUJ; 8		18th	10
2007	Porsche 996 GT3-RS	Y	GT300	26	(Japan) Nobuteru Taniguchi (Japan) Shinichi Yamaji (Japan) Kazuyuki Nishizawa (Germany) Dominik Farnbacher	SUZ; 11	OKA; 3	FUJ; 19	SEP; 13	SUG; Ret	SUZ; Ret	MOT; 1	AUT; 8	FUJ; 1		5th	72
2008	Porsche 996 GT3-RS	Y	GT300	26	(Japan) Nobuteru Taniguchi (Japan) Shinichi Yamaji (Japan) Keita Sawa (Germany) Dominik Farnbacher	SUZ; 3	OKA; 2	FUJ; Ret	SEP; 15	SUG; 7	SUZ; 5	**MOT**; 4	AUT; 15	FUJ; 1		4th	83
2009	Porsche 996 GT3-RS	Y	GT300	26	(Japan) Haruki Kurosawa (Japan) Tsubasa Abe (Japan) Katsuhiko Tsutsui (Japan) Tsubasa Kurosawa	OKA; 10	SUZ; 10	FUJ; 4	SEP; Ret	SUG; 7	SUZ; 16	FUJ; 14	AUT; 9	MOT; 9		11th	38
2010	Porsche 996 GT3-RS	Y	GT300	26	(Ukraine) Igor Sushko (Japan) Masayuki Ueda (Japan) Shogo Mitsuyama	SUZ; 11	OKA; 13	FUJ; 10	SEP	SUG; 18	**SUZ**; Ret	FUJ; C	MOT; 11	NC1; 14	NC2; Ret	20th	12
2010	Porsche 996 GT3-RS	Y	GT300	51	(Japan) Yuya Sakamoto (Japan) Shogo Mitsuyama (Japan) Hideki Yamauchi	SUZ	OKA	FUJ; 20	SEP	SUG; 15	SUZ	FUJ; C	MOT; 16	NC1; 8	NC2; 8	22nd	5
2011	Porsche 996 GT3-RS	Y	GT300	26	(Japan) Kyosuke Mineo (Japan) Hideshi Matsuda (Japan) Junichiro Yamashita (Japan) Shogo Mitsuyama	OKA; 12	FUJ; 11	SEP; 13	SUG; 11	SUZ; 14	FUJ; 15	AUT; 20	MOT; 10	NC1; Ret	NC2; 14	16th	19
2011	Ferrari F430 GT2	Y	GT300	41	(Japan) Shinichi Yamaji (Japan) Hiroshi Koizumi (Japan) Kyosuke Mineo (Japan) Junichiro Yamashita	OKA; 9	FUJ; 9	SEP	SUG; 12	SUZ; 17	FUJ; 21	AUT	MOT; Ret	NC1; 15	NC2; 13	17th	15
2012	Porsche 911 GT3-R	Y	GT300	911	(Japan) Kyosuke Mineo (Japan) Naoki Yokomizo	**OKA**; 2	FUJ; 8	SEP; 2	SUG; 5	SUZ; Ret	FUJ; 4	AUT; 2	MOT; 1	NC1; 8	NC2; 18	**1st**	**102**
2013	Porsche 911 GT3-R	Y	GT300	0	(Japan) Kyosuke Mineo (Japan) Naoki Yokomizo	OKA; 10	FUJ; Ret	SEP; 11	SUG; 3	SUZ; 7	FUJ; 19	AUT; 8	MOT; 10	NC1; 7	NC2; 13	9th	40
2014	Nissan GT-R GT3	Y	GT300	67	(Japan) Shogo Mitsuyama (Japan) Naoki Yokomizo (Japan) Kyosuke Mineo	OKA; 19	FUJ; 9	AUT; 9	SUG; 5	FUJ; 17	SUZ; Ret	BUR	MOT; 16			16th	24
2016	Audi R8 LMS	Y	GT300	26	(Japan) Shogo Mitsuyama (Japan) Yuya Motojima (Japan) Tsubasa Kondo	OKA; 20	FUJ; 15	SUG; 19	FUJ; 8	SUZ; 20	CHA	MOT; 6	MOT; 7			16th	27
2017	Audi R8 LMS	Y	GT300	26	(Japan) Shinnosuke Yamada (Australia) Jake Parsons (Austria) Christian Klien	OKA; 21	FUJ; 21	AUT; 14	SUG; 18	FUJ; 19	SUZ; Ret	CHA; 19	MOT; 14			24th	11
2018	Audi R8 LMS	Y	GT300	26	(Japan) Shinnosuke Yamada (Japan) Shintaro Kawabata (Japan) Shinji Nakano	OKA; 9	FUJ; 15	SUZ; 28	CHA	FUJ; Ret	SUG; 20	AUT; 20	MOT; 16			19th	16

Note: Non-championship races (NC1, NC2) are major races that did not count towards the championship.
