= Hideo Fukuyama =

Japanese racing driver (born 1955)

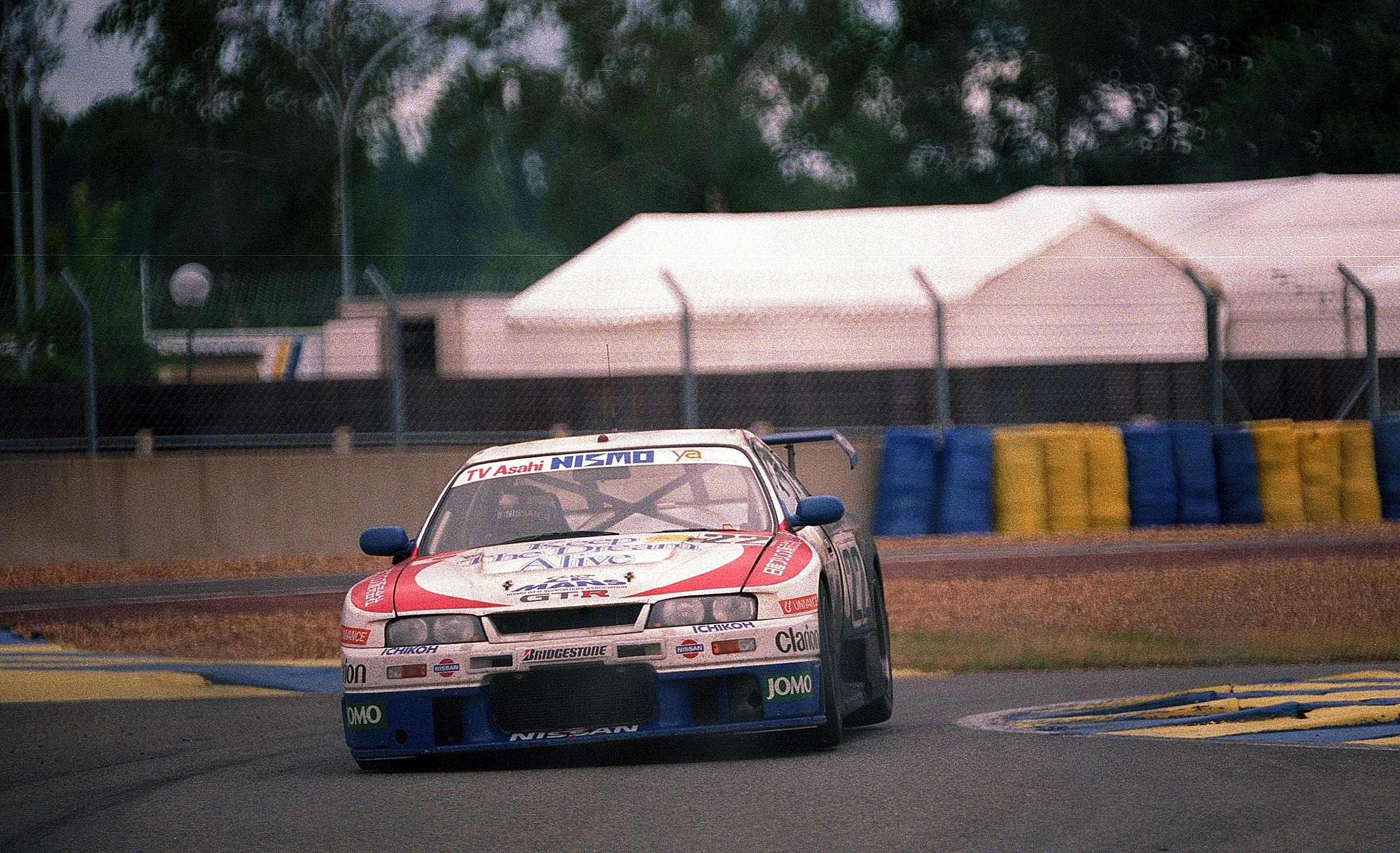
- Hideo Fukuyama's NISMO GT-R at the 1995 24 Hours of Le Mans
- Born: August 13, 1955 (age 71); Suzuka City, Mie Prefecture, Japan
- Achievements: 2000 24 Hours of Le Mans GT3 Class Winner

NASCAR Cup Series career
- 4 races run over 2 years
- Best finish: 63rd (2003)
- First race: 2002 MBNA All-American Heroes 400 (Dover)
- Last race: 2003 Dodge/Save Mart 350 (Sonoma)
Wins	Top tens	Poles
0	0	0

24 Hours of Le Mans career
- Years: 1995, 2000, 2001
- Teams: Team Taisan Advan, NISMO
- Best finish: 10th (1995)
- Class wins: 1 (2000)
- Statistics up to date as of August 15, 2012.

Hideo Fukuyama (福山 英朗, Hideo Fukuyama; born August 13, 1955) is a Japanese former racing driver. A former competitor at the 24 Hours of Le Mans, he attempted to compete in the NASCAR Winston Cup Series in the early 2000s, but only qualified for four races before leaving the series. He was the first Japanese driver to compete in NASCAR's top series. Fukuyama won the JGTC/Super GT title on three occasions, in 1992, 1997 and 2000, as well as the 2000 24 Hours of Le Mans in the GT3 class alongside Atsushi Yogo and Bruno Lambert.

== Career ==
=== Open-wheel and sports cars ===
Competing in his native Japan, Fukuyama established a career as a road racer, winning the 1979 Formula Libre 500 Japanese championship, the 1992 Japanese Touring Car Championship and 1997 Super GT GT300 class championship, and winning the LMGT class at the 2000 24 Hours of Le Mans.

=== Stock cars ===
Fukuyama made his debut in NASCAR competition driving in exhibition races at Suzuka Circuit in 1996 and 1997 for Travis Carter Enterprises, and at Twin Ring Motegi in 1998 for Jeff Davis Racing. He crashed in the inaugural Suzuka Thunder Special in 1996, finishing 22nd; in 1997 he finished 21st, retiring with ignition failure after 103 laps. In Motegi's Coca-Cola 500, he finished seventeenth in the No. 98 Ford.

In 1998 and 1999, Fukuyama competed in two events in the NASCAR Winston West Series, at Pikes Peak International Raceway in 1998, where he finished nineteenth, and in the first NASCAR points event held outside of North America, at Twin Ring Motegi in 1999, where he finished fifteenth.

Having been encouraged to pursue a NASCAR career by Dale Earnhardt, and in September 2002 at Dover International Speedway became the first Japanese driver to qualify for a Winston Cup Series points event. Driving the No. 66 Ford for Haas-Carter Motorsports, he started 43rd in the event, finishing 39th due to transmission failure. Later that year at Martinsville Speedway he finished 43rd in the second and final race of the year he qualified for.

In 2003, Fukuyama competed for Rookie of the Year in the Winston Cup Series, running a limited schedule in Cup as well as in the ARCA Racing Series for Carter, the team being renamed BelCar Racing. He only qualified for two races, at Las Vegas Motor Speedway and Infineon Raceway, posting his best career finish, 33rd, at the former track.

Released from his ride with TCM midway through the 2003 season, Fukuyama returned to his native Japan, where he resumed racing in the Super GT series, as well as becoming an analyst for Japanese television broadcasts of NASCAR.

== Motorsports career results ==
=== 24 Hours of Le Mans results ===
Year	Team	Co-Drivers	Car	Class	Laps	Pos.	Class Pos.
1988	(United Kingdom) ADA Engineering	(United Kingdom) Ian Harrower (Japan) Jiro Yoneyama	ADA 03-Ford Cosworth	C2	318	18th	**2nd**
1995	(Japan) NISMO	(Japan) Masahiko Kondo (Japan) Shunji Kasuya	Nissan Skyline GT-R LM	GT1	271	10th	5th
2000	(Japan) Team Taisan Advan	(Japan) Atsushi Yogo (Belgium) Bruno Lambert	Porsche 911 GT3-R	GT	310	16th	**1st**
2001	(Japan) Team Taisan Advan	(Japan) Atsushi Yogo (Japan) Kazuyuki Nishizawa	Porsche 911 GT3-RS	GT	273	11th	5th

=== Complete Japanese Touring Car Championship results ===
Year	Team	Car	Class	1	2	3	4	5	6	7	8	9	DC	Pts
1992	Hasemi Motorsport	Nissan Skyline GT-R	JTC-1	AID; 1	AUT; 7	SUG; 5	SUZ; 2	MIN; 1	TSU; 4	SEN; 3	FUJ; 2		1st	110
1993	Hasemi Motorsport	Nissan Skyline GT-R	JTC-1	MIN; 2	AUT; 4	SUG; 4	SUZ; 1	AID; 4	TSU; 5	TOK; 5	SEN; Ret	FUJ; 5	7th	89

=== Complete JGTC/Super GT results ===
Year	Team	Car	Class	1	2	3	4	5	6	7	8	9	DC	Pts
1994	Blitz Racing Team	Toyota Supra	GT1	FUJ; Ret	SEN; 7	FUJ	SUG	MIN					20th	4
1995	Makiguchi Engineering	BMW M3	GT2	SUZ; Ret									NC	0
1995	Racing Team Nakaharu	Nissan Skyline GT-R	GT1		FUJ	SEN	FUJ; 6	SUG; Ret	MIN				22nd	6
1996	Nismo	Nissan Skyline GT-R	GT500	SUZ; 4	FUJ; Ret	SEN; 7	FUJ; 3	SUG; 5	MIN; 3				6th	42
1997	RS★R Racing with BANDOH	Nissan Silvia	GT300	SUZ; 1	FUJ; 2	SEN; 2	FUJ; 3	MIN; 1	SUG; 5				**1st**	**90**
1998	Team Daishin	Nissan Silvia	GT300	SUZ; Ret	FUJ; C	SEN; Ret	FUJ; 6	MOT; 8	MIN; 3	SUG; 8			11th	24
1999	Team Daishin	Nissan Silvia	GT300	SUZ; 10	FUJ; Ret	SUG; 3	MIN; Ret	FUJ; 4	TAI; 4	MOT; Ret			10th	33
2000	Team Taisan	Porsche 911	GT300	MOT; 1	FUJ; 1	SUG; 9	FUJ; 7	TAI; 7	MIN; 1	SUZ; 2			**1st**	**85**
2001	Team Taisan	Porsche 911	GT300	TAI; 4	FUJ; 17	SUG; 7	FUJ; 13	MOT; 2	SUZ; 3	MIN; 8			6th	44
2002	Team Taisan	Porsche 911	GT300	TAI; 2	FUJ; Ret	SUG; 16	SEP; 5	FUJ; 1	MOT; 7	MIN; Ret	SUZ; 2		4th	65
2004	Team Gaikokuya	Porsche 911	GT300	TAI	SUG	SEP; Ret	TOK; 13	MOT; Ret	AUT; 15	SUZ; 21			NC	0
2005	A&S Racing	Chevrolet Corvette	GT300	OKA; DNS	FUJ; Ret	SEP; DNQ	SUG; DNQ	MOT; 22	FUJ; Ret	AUT	SUZ		NC	0
2007	DHG Racing	Ford GT	GT300	SUZ	OKA	FUJ	SEP	SUG	SUZ; 9	MOT	AUT	FUJ	28th	2

=== NASCAR ===
(key) (Bold – Pole position awarded by qualifying time. Italics – Pole position earned by points standings or practice time. * – Most laps led.)

==== Winston Cup Series ====
NASCAR Winston Cup Series results
Year	Team	No.	Make	1	2	3	4	5	6	7	8	9	10	11	12	13	14	15	16	17	18	19	20	21	22	23	24	25	26	27	28	29	30	31	32	33	34	35	36	NWCC	Pts	Ref
2002	Haas-Carter Motorsports	66	Ford	DAY	CAR	LVS	ATL	DAR	BRI	TEX	MAR	TAL	CAL	RCH	CLT	DOV	POC	MCH	SON	DAY	CHI	NHA	POC	IND	GLN	MCH	BRI	DAR	RCH	NHA	DOV; 39	KAN	TAL	CLT	MAR; 43	ATL	CAR; DNQ	PHO	HOM	72nd	80	
2003	BelCar Racing	66	Ford	DAY	CAR	LVS; 33	ATL	DAR	BRI	TEX	TAL	MAR	CAL; DNQ	RCH; Wth	CLT	DOV	POC	MCH	SON; 43	DAY	CHI	NHA	POC	IND	GLN	MCH	BRI	DAR	RCH	NHA	DOV	TAL	KAN	CLT	MAR	ATL	PHO	CAR	HOM	63rd	98	

==== Winston West Series ====
NASCAR Winston West Series results
Year	Team	No.	Make	1	2	3	4	5	6	7	8	9	10	11	12	13	14	NWWC	Pts	Ref
1998	Stroppe Motorsports	38	Ford	TUS	LVS	PHO	CAL	HPT	MMR	AMP	POR	CAL	PPR; 19	EVG	SON	MMR	LVS	79th	106	
1999		19	Ford	TUS	LVS	PHO	CAL	PPR	MMR	IRW	EVG	POR	IRW	RMR	LVS	MMR	MOT; 15	69th	118	

=== ARCA Re/Max Series ===
(key) (Bold – Pole position awarded by qualifying time. Italics – Pole position earned by points standings or practice time. * – Most laps led.)

ARCA Re/Max Series results
Year	Team	No.	Make	1	2	3	4	5	6	7	8	9	10	11	12	13	14	15	16	17	18	19	20	21	22	ARMC	Pts	Ref
2003	Travis Carter Enterprises	9	Ford	DAY	ATL; DNQ	NSH; 34	SLM	TOL	KEN	CLT; 16	BLN	KAN	MCH	LER	POC; 38	POC	NSH	ISF	WIN	DSF	CHI	SLM	TAL	CLT	SBO	108th	235	
