= Mitsuhiro Kinoshita =

Japanese racing driver

Mitsuhiro Kinoshita (born January 31, 1965) is a Japanese race car driver.

== Racing record ==
=== Complete Japanese Touring Car Championship (1994-) results ===
Year	Team	Car	1	2	3	4	5	6	7	8	9	10	11	12	13	14	15	16	17	18	DC	Pts
1994	Team Advan	BMW 318i	AUT; 1	AUT; 2	SUG; 1 NC	SUG; 2 Ret	TOK; 1	TOK; 2	SUZ; 1; 18	SUZ; 2; 14	MIN; 1; 13	MIN; 2 Ret	AID; 1 Ret	AID; 2 DNS	TSU; 1; 14	TSU; 2 Ret	SEN; 1 Ret	SEN; 2; 14	FUJ; 1; 25	FUJ; 2 DSQ	NC	0
1995	Club Endless	BMW 318i	FUJ; 1; 5	FUJ; 2; 4	SUG; 1; 10	SUG; 2 Ret	TOK; 1; 6	TOK; 2; 18	SUZ; 1; 21	SUZ; 2 Ret	MIN; 1; 19	MIN; 2; 6	AID; 1; 8	AID; 2; 15	SEN; 1 Ret	SEN; 2; 14	FUJ; 1; 13	FUJ; 2; 13			15th	27
1996	Endless Sport	BMW 318i	FUJ; 1; 11	FUJ; 2; 16	SUG; 1 Ret	SUG; 2; 5	SUZ; 1; 7	SUZ; 2; 10	MIN; 1; 5	MIN; 2; 10	SEN; 1; 8	SEN; 2; 10	TOK; 1; 11	TOK; 2; 11	FUJ; 1; 11	FUJ; 2; 11					15th	22
1997	Endless Sport	BMW 318i	FUJ; 1	FUJ; 2	AID; 1	AID; 2	SUG; 1	SUG; 2	SUZ; 1	SUZ; 2	MIN; 1	MIN; 2	SEN; 1	SEN; 2	TOK; 1	TOK; 2	FUJ; 1 Ret	FUJ; 2; 9			20th	2

=== Complete JGTC/Super GT Results ===
Year	Team	Car	Class	1	2	3	4	5	6	7	8	9	DC	Pts
1995	Endless Sports	Nissan Skyline GT-R	GT1	SUZ	FUJ	SEN	FUJ; 17	SUG	MIN				NC	0
1996	Team Taisan	Ferrari F40	GT500	SUZ	FUJ	SEN	MIN	SUG	MIN; Ret				NC	0
1997	Endless Sports	Nissan Skyline GT-R	GT500	SUZ; 8	FUJ; Ret	SEN; 11	FUJ; 7	MIN; 10	SUG; 12				22nd	8
1998	Endless Sports	Nissan Skyline GT-R	GT500	SUZ	FUJ; C	SEN; Ret	FUJ; 16	MOT; 12	MIN; 17	SUG; Ret			NC	0
1999	Endless Sports	Nissan Skyline GT-R	GT500	SUZ; 12	FUJ; 10	SUG; 10	MIN	FUJ; 16	TAI	MOT			26th	2
2000	Tsuchiya Engineering	Toyota Supra	GT500	MOT; 13	FUJ; 10	SUG; 14	FUJ; 8	TAI; 8	MIN; 7	SUZ; 13			18th	11
2001	Hitotsuyama Racing	McLaren F1 GTR	GT500	TAI; 10	FUJ	SUG	FUJ	MOT	SUZ	MIN			26th	1
2002	Team Taisan Advan	Porsche 911	GT300	TAI; 2	FUJ; Ret	SUG; 16	SEP; 5	FUJ; 1	MOT; 7	MIN; Ret	SUZ; 2		4th	65
2003	Hasemi Motorsports	Nissan Fairlady Z	GT300	TAI; 6	FUJ; 2	SUG; 17	FUJ; 3	FUJ; 21	MOT; 3	AUT; 4	SUZ; 2		1st	77
2004	Team Daishin	Nissan Fairlady Z	GT300	TAI; 8	SUG; 11	SEP; 7	TOK; 9	MOT; 17	AUT; 4	SUZ; 6			7th	29
2005	Endless Sports	Nissan Fairlady Z	GT300	OKA; 1	FUJ; 9	SEP; 3	SUG; 5	MOT; 4	FUJ; 5	AUT; Ret	SUZ; 10		6th	58
2006	Endless Sports	Porsche 911	GT300	SUZ; 9	OKA; 22	FUJ; 3	SEP; 6	SUG; Ret	SUZ; Ret	MOT; 11	AUT; 14	FUJ; 20	21st	18
2007	Hankook KTR	Porsche 911 GT3-RSR	GT300	SUZ	OKA; 10	FUJ; 20	SEP; 10	SUG; 3	SUZ; 16	MOT; 17	AUT; 11	FUJ; 9	17th	18
2008	Hankook KTR	Porsche 911 GT3-RSR	GT300	SUZ; 11	OKA; 7	FUJ; 17	SEP; 11	SUG; 9	SUZ; Ret	MOT; 6	AUT; 5	FUJ; Ret	21st	18
2009	Hankook KTR	Porsche 911 GT3-RSR	GT300	OKA	SUZ; 1	FUJ	SEP	SUG; 1	SUZ	FUJ; 6	AUT	MOT	9th	45
2010	Hankook KTR	Porsche 997 GT3-RSR	GT300	SUZ; 6	OKA; 8	FUJ; Ret	SEP; 16	SUG					16th	8
2010	Good Smile Racing with COX	Porsche 997 GT3-RSR	GT300						SUZ; 10	FUJ	MOT		16th	8
