= 2001 All Japan Grand Touring Car Championship =

Motor racing season

The 2001 All Japan Grand Touring Car Championship was the ninth season of Japan Automobile Federation GT premiere racing. It was marked as well as the nineteenth season of a JAF-sanctioned sports car racing championship dating back to the All Japan Sports Prototype Championship. The GT500 class drivers' champions of 2001 were Yuji Tachikawa and Hironori Takeuchi, who had not won a single race during the season driving the No. 38 au Cerumo Toyota Supra, while Nismo won the teams' championship. In the GT300 category, the class champions were the No. 81 Advan Team Daishin Nissan Silvia driven by Takayuki Aoki and Noboyuki Oyagi.

This season marked the final competitive race victory for the McLaren F1 GTR, when Team Take One won the CP Mine GT Race.

== Drivers and teams ==
=== GT500 ===
Team	Make	Car	Engine	No.	Drivers	Tyre	Rounds
Mugen x Dome Project	Honda	Honda NSX	Honda C32B 3.5 L V6	1	(Japan) Ryō Michigami	B	All
Mugen x Dome Project	Honda	Honda NSX	Honda C32B 3.5 L V6	1	(Japan) Hidetoshi Mitsusada	B	All
Mugen x Dome Project	Honda	Honda NSX	Honda C32B 3.5 L V6	18	(France) Sébastien Philippe	B	All
Mugen x Dome Project	Honda	Honda NSX	Honda C32B 3.5 L V6	18	(Japan) Hiroki Katoh	B	1–4, NC
Mugen x Dome Project	Honda	Honda NSX	Honda C32B 3.5 L V6	18	(France) Benoît Tréluyer	B	5–7
Esso Toyota Team LeMans	Toyota	Toyota Supra	Toyota 3S-GT 2.0 L Turbo I4	6	(Japan) Hideki Noda	B	All
Esso Toyota Team LeMans	Toyota	Toyota Supra	Toyota 3S-GT 2.0 L Turbo I4	6	(Japan) Juichi Wakisaka	B	All
Autobacs Racing Team Aguri	Honda	Honda NSX	Honda C32B 3.5 L V6	8	(Japan) Katsutomo Kaneishi	B	All
Autobacs Racing Team Aguri	Honda	Honda NSX	Honda C32B 3.5 L V6	8	(Japan) Keiichi Tsuchiya	B	All
Calsonic Team Impul	Nissan	Nissan Skyline GT-R	Nissan RB26DETT 2.7 L Twin Turbo I6	12	(Japan) Satoshi Motoyama	B	All
Calsonic Team Impul	Nissan	Nissan Skyline GT-R	Nissan RB26DETT 2.7 L Twin Turbo I6	12	(Japan) Naoki Hattori	B	1–3
Calsonic Team Impul	Nissan	Nissan Skyline GT-R	Nissan RB26DETT 2.7 L Twin Turbo I6	12	(Japan) Kazuyoshi Hoshino	B	4–7, NC
Hitotsuyama Racing	McLaren	McLaren F1 GTR	BMW S70/2 6.0 L V12	21	(Japan) Akihiko Nakaya	D	1–3, 5–6
Hitotsuyama Racing	McLaren	McLaren F1 GTR	BMW S70/2 6.0 L V12	21	(Japan) Mitsuhiro Kinoshita	D	1
Hitotsuyama Racing	McLaren	McLaren F1 GTR	BMW S70/2 6.0 L V12	21	(Japan) Yasushi Hitotsuyama	D	2–4, NC
Hitotsuyama Racing	McLaren	McLaren F1 GTR	BMW S70/2 6.0 L V12	21	(Japan) Naoki Hattori	D	4–7, NC
Hitotsuyama Racing	McLaren	McLaren F1 GTR	BMW S70/2 6.0 L V12	21	(Japan) Mikio Hitotsuyama	D	7
Nismo	Nissan	Nissan Skyline GT-R	Nissan RB26DETT 2.7 L Twin Turbo I6	22	(Germany) Michael Krumm	B	All
Nismo	Nissan	Nissan Skyline GT-R	Nissan RB26DETT 2.7 L Twin Turbo I6	22	(Japan) Tetsuya Tanaka	B	All
Nismo	Nissan	Nissan Skyline GT-R	Nissan RB26DETT 2.7 L Twin Turbo I6	23	(France) Érik Comas	B	All
Nismo	Nissan	Nissan Skyline GT-R	Nissan RB26DETT 2.7 L Twin Turbo I6	23	(Japan) Masami Kageyama	B	All
Tsuchiya Engineering	Toyota	Toyota Supra	Toyota 3S-GT 2.0 L Turbo I4	25	(Japan) Manabu Orido	Y	1–7
Tsuchiya Engineering	Toyota	Toyota Supra	Toyota 3S-GT 2.0 L Turbo I4	25	(Japan) Seiji Ara	Y	1–7
Team Take One	McLaren	McLaren F1 GTR	BMW S70/2 6.0 L V12	30	(Portugal) André Couto	B	1–7
Team Take One	McLaren	McLaren F1 GTR	BMW S70/2 6.0 L V12	30	(Japan) Hideki Okada	B	1–7
Toyota Team Cerumo	Toyota	Toyota Supra	Toyota 3S-GT 2.0 L Turbo I4	33	(Japan) Masahiko Kondo	B	All
Toyota Team Cerumo	Toyota	Toyota Supra	Toyota 3S-GT 2.0 L Turbo I4	33	(Japan) Ukyo Katayama	B	1–4, 6–7, NC
Toyota Team Cerumo	Toyota	Toyota Supra	Toyota 3S-GT 2.0 L Turbo I4	33	(Japan) Shigekazu Wakisaka	B	5
Toyota Team Cerumo	Toyota	Toyota Supra	Toyota 3S-GT 2.0 L Turbo I4	38	(Japan) Yuji Tachikawa	B	All
Toyota Team Cerumo	Toyota	Toyota Supra	Toyota 3S-GT 2.0 L Turbo I4	38	(Japan) Hironori Takeuchi	B	All
Toyota Team TOM'S	Toyota	Toyota Supra	Toyota 3S-GT 2.0 L Turbo I4	36	(Japan) Takeshi Tsuchiya	M	All
Toyota Team TOM'S	Toyota	Toyota Supra	Toyota 3S-GT 2.0 L Turbo I4	36	(Japan) Takuya Kurosawa	M	1–4, 6–7
Toyota Team TOM'S	Toyota	Toyota Supra	Toyota 3S-GT 2.0 L Turbo I4	36	(Italy) Paolo Montin	M	5
Toyota Team TOM'S	Toyota	Toyota Supra	Toyota 3S-GT 2.0 L Turbo I4	36	(Australia) Wayne Gardner	M	NC
Toyota Team TOM'S	Toyota	Toyota Supra	Toyota 3S-GT 2.0 L Turbo I4	37	(Australia) Wayne Gardner	M	1–7
Toyota Team TOM'S	Toyota	Toyota Supra	Toyota 3S-GT 2.0 L Turbo I4	37	(Japan) Shinichi Yamaji	M	1–7
Denso Toyota Team SARD	Toyota	Toyota Supra	Toyota 3S-GT 2.0 L Turbo I4	39	(France) Jérémie Dufour	Y	1–7
Denso Toyota Team SARD	Toyota	Toyota Supra	Toyota 3S-GT 2.0 L Turbo I4	39	(Japan) Masahiko Kageyama	Y	1–2
Denso Toyota Team SARD	Toyota	Toyota Supra	Toyota 3S-GT 2.0 L Turbo I4	39	(France) Romain Dumas	Y	3–7
Mobil 1 Nakajima Racing	Honda	Honda NSX	Honda C32B 3.5 L V6	64	(Japan) Tsugio Matsuda	B	All
Mobil 1 Nakajima Racing	Honda	Honda NSX	Honda C32B 3.5 L V6	64	(Germany) Dominik Schwager	B	All
JLOC	Lamborghini	Lamborghini Diablo JGT-1	Lamborghini L532 6.0 L V12	88	(Italy) Marco Apicella	D	All
JLOC	Lamborghini	Lamborghini Diablo JGT-1	Lamborghini L532 6.0 L V12	88	(Japan) Naohiro Furuya	D	All
Raybrig Team Kunimitsu with Mooncraft	Honda	Honda NSX	Honda C32B 3.5 L V6	100	(Japan) Akira Iida	B	All
Raybrig Team Kunimitsu with Mooncraft	Honda	Honda NSX	Honda C32B 3.5 L V6	100	(Japan) Daisuke Ito	B	All

=== GT300 ===
Team	Make	Car	Engine	No.	Drivers	Tyre	Rounds
TOM'S Spirit	Toyota	Toyota MR-S	Toyota 3S-GTE 2.0 L Turbo I4	0	(Japan) Masahiro Matsunaga	Y	All
TOM'S Spirit	Toyota	Toyota MR-S	Toyota 3S-GTE 2.0 L Turbo I4	0	(Japan) Kumi Sato	Y	All
Dream28	Honda	Honda NSX	Honda C32B 3.4 L V6	2	(Japan) Kazuho Takahashi	Y	5, 6
Dream28	Honda	Honda NSX	Honda C32B 3.4 L V6	2	(Japan) Hiroshi Kimura	Y	5
Dream28	Honda	Honda NSX	Honda C32B 3.4 L V6	2	(Japan) Akira Watanabe	Y	6
Hasemi Motorsport	Nissan	Nissan Silvia (S15)	Nissan SR20DET 2.0 L Turbo I4	3	(Japan) Yuji Ide	Y	All
Hasemi Motorsport	Nissan	Nissan Silvia (S15)	Nissan SR20DET 2.0 L Turbo I4	3	(Japan) Masataka Yanagida	Y	All
BSA Porsche Team Competizione	Porsche	Porsche 993 RS	Porsche M64/60 3.6 L Turbo F6	5	(Malaysia) Key Soon Yue	M	NC
BSA Porsche Team Competizione	Porsche	Porsche 993 RS	Porsche M64/60 3.6 L Turbo F6	5	(Malaysia) Ila Ridak	M	NC
BSA Porsche Team Competizione	Porsche	Porsche 993 RS	Porsche M64/60 3.6 L Turbo F6	15	(Hong Kong) Siu Tit Lung	M	NC
BSA Porsche Team Competizione	Porsche	Porsche 993 RS	Porsche M64/60 3.6 L Turbo F6	15	(Hong Kong) Siu Yuk Lung	M	NC
RE Amemiya Racing	Mazda	Mazda RX-7	Mazda RE20B 2.0 L 3-rotor	7	(Japan) Tetsuya Yamano	Y	All
RE Amemiya Racing	Mazda	Mazda RX-7	Mazda RE20B 2.0 L 3-rotor	7	(Japan) Haruhiko Matsumoto	Y	All
Team Daikokuya	Porsche	Porsche 993 RS	Porsche M64/80 3.6 L Turbo F6	9	(Japan) Akira Watanabe	Y	1–5
Team Daikokuya	Porsche	Porsche 993 RS	Porsche M64/80 3.6 L Turbo F6	9	(Japan) Tsunefumi Hioki	Y	1, 4–6
Team Daikokuya	Porsche	Porsche 993 RS	Porsche M64/80 3.6 L Turbo F6	9	(Japan) Yukihiro Hane	Y	2, NC
Team Daikokuya	Porsche	Porsche 993 RS	Porsche M64/80 3.6 L Turbo F6	9	(Japan) Yosuke Shimoshima	Y	NC, 6
Ability Motorsport	Porsche	Porsche 996 GT3-R	Porsche M96/77 3.6 L F6	10	(Japan) Yutaka Yamagishi	Y	1–2, 4
Ability Motorsport	Porsche	Porsche 996 GT3-R	Porsche M96/77 3.6 L F6	10	(Japan) Takahisa Ohno	Y	1–2, 4
Team Gainer	Porsche	Porsche 996 GT3-R	Porsche M96/77 3.6 L F6	11	(Japan) Junichi Ikura	Y	All
Team Gainer	Porsche	Porsche 996 GT3-R	Porsche M96/77 3.6 L F6	11	(Japan) Koji Ushikubo	Y	1, 7
Team Gainer	Porsche	Porsche 996 GT3-R	Porsche M96/77 3.6 L F6	11	(Japan) Yusei Maki	Y	2–6
Racing Project Bandoh	Toyota	Toyota MR-S	Toyota 3S-GTE 2.0 L Turbo I4	19	(Japan) Satoshi Goto	Y	All
Racing Project Bandoh	Toyota	Toyota MR-S	Toyota 3S-GTE 2.0 L Turbo I4	19	(Japan) Minoru Tanaka	Y	All
Team Taisan	Porsche	Porsche 911 GT3-R	Porsche M96/77 3.6 L F6	24	(Japan) Hideshi Matsuda	Y	All
Team Taisan	Porsche	Porsche 911 GT3-R	Porsche M96/77 3.6 L F6	24	(Japan) Kazuyuki Nishizawa	Y	All
Team Taisan	Porsche	Porsche 911 GT3-R	Porsche M96/77 3.6 L F6	26	(Japan) Atsushi Yogo	Y	All
Team Taisan	Porsche	Porsche 911 GT3-R	Porsche M96/77 3.6 L F6	26	(Japan) Hideo Fukuyama	Y	All
Team Taisan	Chrysler	Chrysler Viper GTS-R	Chrysler EWB 8.0 L V10	55	(Japan) Eiji Yamada	Y	All
Team Taisan	Chrysler	Chrysler Viper GTS-R	Chrysler EWB 8.0 L V10	55	(Japan) Takayuki Kinoshita	Y	All
ARTA with A'PEX	Toyota	Toyota MR-S	Toyota 3S-GTE 2.0 L Turbo I4	31	(Japan) Morio Nitta	Y	All
ARTA with A'PEX	Toyota	Toyota MR-S	Toyota 3S-GTE 2.0 L Turbo I4	31	(Japan) Shinichi Takagi	Y	All
Auto Staff Racing	Nissan	Nissan Silvia (S15)	Nissan SR20DET 2.0 L Turbo I4	51	(Japan) Naofumi Omoto	Y	2–7
Auto Staff Racing	Nissan	Nissan Silvia (S15)	Nissan SR20DET 2.0 L Turbo I4	51	(Japan) Yasukichi Yamamoto	Y	2–7
R&D Sport	Porsche	Porsche 911 GT3-R	Porsche M96/77 3.6 L F6	62	(Japan) Shinsuke Shibahara	D	All
R&D Sport	Porsche	Porsche 911 GT3-R	Porsche M96/77 3.6 L F6	62	(Japan) Yasuhisa Fujiwara	D	1–2
R&D Sport	Porsche	Porsche 911 GT3-R	Porsche M96/77 3.6 L F6	62	(Japan) Shogo Mitsuyama	D	3–7
R&D Sport	Porsche	Porsche 911 GT3-R	Porsche M96/77 3.6 L F6	63	(Japan) "OSAMU"	D	All
R&D Sport	Porsche	Porsche 911 GT3-R	Porsche M96/77 3.6 L F6	63	(Japan) Takamasa Nakagawa	D	All
Amprex Motorsports	Mazda	Mazda RX-7	Mazda RE20B 2.0 L 3-rotor	65	(Japan) Genji Hashimoto	Y	NC
Amprex Motorsports	Mazda	Mazda RX-7	Mazda RE20B 2.0 L 3-rotor	65	(Hong Kong) Charles Kwan	Y	NC
Team Gaikokuya	Porsche	Porsche 996 GT3-RS	Porsche M96/77 3.6 L F6	70	(Japan) Yoshimi Ishibashi	D	All
Team Gaikokuya	Porsche	Porsche 996 GT3-RS	Porsche M96/77 3.6 L F6	70	(Japan) Hiroaki Suga	D	All
SigmaTec Racing Team	Toyota	Toyota MR-S	Toyota 3S-GTE 2.0 L Turbo I4	71	(Japan) Guts Jyonai	Y	1, 3–7
SigmaTec Racing Team	Toyota	Toyota MR-S	Toyota 3S-GTE 2.0 L Turbo I4	71	(Japan) Eiichi Tajima	Y	1, 3–7
Cusco Racing	Subaru	Subaru Impreza WRX STI	Subaru EJ20 2.0 L Turbo F4	77	(Japan) Katsuo Kobayashi	Y	All
Cusco Racing	Subaru	Subaru Impreza WRX STI	Subaru EJ20 2.0 L Turbo F4	77	(Japan) Tatsuya Tanigawa	Y	All
Team Daishin	Nissan	Nissan Silvia (S15)	Nissan SR20DET 2.0 L Turbo I4	81	(Japan) Nobuyuki Ohyagi	Y	All
Team Daishin	Nissan	Nissan Silvia (S15)	Nissan SR20DET 2.0 L Turbo I4	81	(Japan) Takayuki Aoki	Y	All
KRAFT	Toyota	Toyota Corolla Sprinter Trueno (AE86)	Toyota 3S-GTE 2.0 L Turbo I4	86	(Japan) Masaoki Nagashima	Y	1–3
KRAFT	Toyota	Toyota Corolla Sprinter Trueno (AE86)	Toyota 3S-GTE 2.0 L Turbo I4	86	(Japan) Koji Matsuda	Y	1–3
KRAFT	Toyota	Toyota MR-S	Toyota 3S-GTE 2.0 L Turbo I4	86	(Japan) Masaoki Nagashima	Y	4–7
KRAFT	Toyota	Toyota MR-S	Toyota 3S-GTE 2.0 L Turbo I4	86	(Japan) Koji Matsuda	Y	4–7
Dentaire ProJet Racing	Ferrari	Ferrari 360	Ferrari F131B 3.6 L V8	360	(Japan) Seigo Nishizawa	Y	All
Dentaire ProJet Racing	Ferrari	Ferrari 360	Ferrari F131B 3.6 L V8	360	(Japan) Kota Sasaki	Y	All
Team Sri Lanka	Mosler	Mosler MT900R	Chevrolet LS1 5.7 L V8	900	(Sri Lanka) Dilantha Malagamuwa	Y	1–4
Team Sri Lanka	Mosler	Mosler MT900R	Chevrolet LS1 5.7 L V8	900	(Japan) Takeshi Asami	Y	1–4
Team Sri Lanka	Mosler	Mosler MT900R	Chevrolet LS1 5.7 L V8	900	(Portugal) João Barbosa	Y	NC
A&S Racing	Mosler	Mosler MT900R	Chevrolet LS1 5.7 L V8	901	(Japan) Takeshi Asami	Y	5
A&S Racing	Mosler	Mosler MT900R	Chevrolet LS1 5.7 L V8	901	(Japan) Yasutaka Hinoi	Y	5–6
A&S Racing	Mosler	Mosler MT900R	Chevrolet LS1 5.7 L V8	901	(Japan) Tetsuji Tamanaka	Y	6–7
A&S Racing	Mosler	Mosler MT900R	Chevrolet LS1 5.7 L V8	901	(Japan) Tetsuya Nakajima	Y	6–7
910 Racing	Porsche	Porsche 996 GT3 RS	Porsche M96/77 3.6 L F6	910	(Japan) Jukuchou Sunako	Y	All
910 Racing	Porsche	Porsche 996 GT3 RS	Porsche M96/77 3.6 L F6	910	(Japan) Hisashi Wada	Y	All
910 Racing	Porsche	Porsche 996 GT3 RS	Porsche M96/77 3.6 L F6	910	(United Kingdom) Adam Wilcox	Y	NC
910 Racing	Porsche	Porsche 996 GT3 RS	Porsche M96/77 3.6 L F6	911	(Japan) Masamitsu Ishihara	Y	2, 4
910 Racing	Porsche	Porsche 996 GT3 RS	Porsche M96/77 3.6 L F6	911	(Japan) Akira Hirakawa	Y	1

== Schedule ==
Round	Race	Circuit	Date
1	GT Championship in TI	(Japan) TI Circuit	April 15
2	All Japan Fuji GT Race	(Japan) Fuji Speedway	May 4
3	SUGO GT Championship	(Japan) Sportsland SUGO	May 27
NC	Tmtouch Japan GT Championship Malaysia	(Malaysia) Sepang Circuit	June 24
4	Japan Special GT Cup	(Japan) Fuji Speedway	August 5
5	Motegi GT Championship Race	(Japan) Twin Ring Motegi	September 16
6	Suzuka GT 300 km	(Japan) Suzuka Circuit	October 28
7	CP Mine GT Race	(Japan) Mine Circuit	November 11

== Season results ==
Round	Circuit	GT500 Winning Team	GT300 Winning Team
Round	Circuit	GT500 Winning Drivers	GT300 Winning Drivers
1	TI Circuit	(Japan) #1 Loctite Mugen Honda NSX	(Japan) #31 ARTA A'PEX Toyota MR-S
1	TI Circuit	(Japan) Hidetoshi Mitsusada (Japan) Ryō Michigami	(Japan) Morio Nitta (Japan) Shinichi Takagi
2	Mt. Fuji	(Japan) #6 ESSO Toyota Supra	(Japan) #81 Advan Team Daishin Nissan Silvia
2	Mt. Fuji	(Japan) Hideki Noda (Japan) Juichi Wakisaka	(Japan) Takayuki Aoki (Japan) Noboyuki Oyagi
3	Sportsland SUGO	(Japan) #37 ZENT TOM'S Toyota Supra	(Japan) #7 RE Amemiya Mazda RX-7
3	Sportsland SUGO	(Japan) Shinichi Yamaji (Australia) Wayne Gardner	(Japan) Haruhiko Matsumoto (Japan) Tetsuya Yamano
NC	Sepang Circuit	(Japan) #6 ESSO Toyota Supra	(Japan) #3 Hasemi Motorsports Nissan Silvia
NC	Sepang Circuit	(Japan) Hideki Noda (Japan) Juichi Wakisaka	(Japan) Masataka Yanagida (Japan) Yuji Ide
4	Mt. Fuji	(Japan) #22 Xanavi NISMO Nissan Skyline GT-R	(Japan) #81 Advan Team Daishin Nissan Silvia
4	Mt. Fuji	(Japan) Tetsuya Tanaka (Germany) Michael Krumm	(Japan) Takayuki Aoki (Japan) Noboyuki Oyagi
5	Twin Ring Motegi	(Japan) #64 Mobil 1 Honda NSX	(Japan) #19 WedsSport Toyota MR-S
5	Twin Ring Motegi	(Japan) Tsugio Matsuda (Germany) Dominik Schwager	(Japan) Minoru Tanaka (Japan) Satoshi Goto
6	Suzuka Circuit	(Japan) #8 ARTA Honda NSX	(Japan) #86 KRAFT Toyota MR-S
6	Suzuka Circuit	(Japan) Keiichi Tsuchiya (Japan) Katsutomo Kaneishi	(Japan) Koji Matsuda (Japan) Masaoki Nagashima
7	Mine Circuit	(Japan) #30 Team Take One McLaren F1 GTR	(Japan) #71 Sigma Tech Toyota MR-S
7	Mine Circuit	(Portugal) Andre Couto (Japan) Hideki Okada	(Japan) Eiichi Tajima (Japan) Guts Jyonai

== Standings ==
=== GT500 class ===
==== Drivers' standings ====
Scoring system

Position	1st	2nd	3rd	4th	5th	6th	7th	8th	9th	10th
Points	20	15	12	10	8	6	4	3	2	1

Rank	No.	Driver	TAI (Japan)	FUJ (Japan)	SUG (Japan)	SEP (Malaysia)	FUJ (Japan)	MOT (Japan)	SUZ (Japan)	MIN (Japan)	PTS
1	38	(Japan) Hironori Takeuchi (Japan) Yuji Tachikawa	Ret	2	3	12	4	2	6	16	58
2	8	(Japan) Katsutomo Kaneishi (Japan) Keiichi Tsuchiya	2	6	2	9	12	11	1	Ret	56
3	1	(Japan) Ryō Michigami (Japan) Hidetoshi Mitsusada	1	8	4	5	5	12	2	12	56
4	23	(France) Érik Comas (Japan) Masami Kageyama	13	4	10	4	2	Ret	3	2	53
5	22	(Germany) Michael Krumm (Japan) Tetsuya Tanaka	4	3	Ret	3	1	10	8	6	52
6	37/36	(Australia) Wayne Gardner	5	9	1	Ret	10	8	4	9	46
6	37	(Japan) Shinichi Yamaji	5	9	1		10	8	4	9	46
7	6	(Japan) Hideki Noda (Japan) Juichi Wakisaka	Ret	1	5	1	3	13	Ret	14	40
8	64	(Japan) Tsugio Matsuda (Germany) Dominik Schwager	3	12	14	8	6	1	Ret	Ret	38
9	30	(Portugal) André Couto (Japan) Hideki Okada	8	Ret	12		16	6	10	1	30
10	100	(Japan) Akira Iida (Japan) Daisuke Ito	6	5	Ret	6	9	4	13	8	29
11	12	(Japan) Satoshi Motoyama	15	Ret	7	7	7	3	11	5	28
12	36	(Japan) Takeshi Tsuchiya	11	10	8	Ret	8	5	5	7	27
13	12	(Japan) Kazuyoshi Hoshino				7	7	3	11	5	24
14	39	(France) Jérémie Dufour	7	7	9		13	Ret	9	4	22
15	36	(Japan) Takuya Kurosawa	11	10	8		8		5	7	19
16	18	(France) Sébastien Philippe	14	15	6	2	15	14	12	3	18
17	39	(France) Romain Dumas			9		13	Ret	9	4	14
18	18	(France) Benoît Tréluyer						14	12	3	12
19	25	(Japan) Manabu Orido (Japan) Seiji Ara	9	11	11		DNQ	7	7	10	11
20	36	(Italy) Paolo Montin						5			8
21	39	(Japan) Masahiko Kageyama	7	7							8
22	18	(Japan) Hiroki Katoh	14	15	6	2	15				6
23	12/21	(Japan) Naoki Hattori	15	Ret	7	10	11	Ret	Ret	11	4
24	33	(Japan) Masahiko Kondo	12	14	13	11	14	9	Ret	13	2
24	33	(Japan) Shigekazu Wakisaka						9			2
26	21	(Japan) Akihiko Nakaya	10	13	Ret			Ret	Ret		1
26	21	(Japan) Mitsuhiro Kinoshita	10								1
-	21	(Japan) Yasushi Hitotsuyama		13	Ret	10	11				0
-	21	(Japan) Mikio Hitotsuyama								11	0
-	33	(Japan) Ukyo Katayama	12	12	13	11	14		Ret	13	0
-	88	(Italy) Marco Apicella (Japan) Naohiro Furuya	DNS	Ret	DNS	Ret	Ret	15	14	15	0
Rank		Driver	TAI (Japan)	FUJ (Japan)	SUG (Japan)	SEP (Malaysia)	FUJ (Japan)	MOT (Japan)	SUZ (Japan)	MIN (Japan)	PTS

Colour	Result
Gold	Winner
Silver	Second place
Bronze	Third place
Green	Points classification
Blue	Non-points classification
Blue	Non-classified finish (NC)
Purple	Retired, not classified (Ret)
Red	Did not qualify (DNQ)
Red	Did not pre-qualify (DNPQ)
Black	Disqualified (DSQ)
White	Did not start (DNS)
White	Withdrew (WD)
White	Race cancelled (C)
Blank	Did not practice (DNP)
Blank	Did not arrive (DNA)
Blank	Excluded (EX)

==== GT500 Teams' standings ====
For teams that entered multiple cars, only the best result from each round counted towards the teams' championship.

Rank	Team	No.	TAI (Japan)	FUJ (Japan)	SUG (Japan)	SEP (Malaysia)	FUJ (Japan)	MOT (Japan)	SUZ (Japan)	MIN (Japan)	PTS
1	Nismo	22	4	3	Ret	3	1	10	8	6	71
1	Nismo	23	13	4	10	4	2	Ret	3	2	71
2	Mugen x Dome Project	1	1	8	4	5	5	12	2	12	68
2	Mugen x Dome Project	18	14	15	6	2	15	14	12	3	68
3	Toyota Team Cerumo	33	12	14	13	11	14	9	Ret	13	58
3	Toyota Team Cerumo	38	Ret	2	3	12	4	2	6	16	58
4	Autobacs Racing Team Aguri	8	2	6	2	9	12	11	1	Ret	56
5	Toyota Team TOM'S	36	11	10	8	Ret	8	5	5	7	55
5	Toyota Team TOM'S	37	5	9	1		10	8	4	9	55
6	Esso Toyota Team LeMans	6	Ret	1	5	1	3	13	Ret	14	40
7	Mobil 1 Nakajima Racing	64	3	12	14	8	6	1	Ret	Ret	38
8	Team Take One	30	8	Ret	12		16	6	10	1	30
9	Team Kunimitsu with Mooncraft	100	6	5	Ret	6	9	4	13	8	29
10	Team Impul	12	15	Ret	7	7	7	3	11	5	28
11	Toyota Team SARD	39	7	7	9		13	Ret	9	4	22
12	Tsuchiya Engineering	25	9	11	11		-	7	7	10	11
13	Hitotsuyama Racing	21	10	13	Ret	10	11	Ret	Ret	11	1
-	JLOC	88	DNS	Ret	DNS	Ret	Ret	15	14	15	0
Rank	Team	No.	TAI (Japan)	FUJ (Japan)	SUG (Japan)	SEP (Malaysia)	FUJ (Japan)	MOT (Japan)	SUZ (Japan)	MIN (Japan)	PTS

=== GT300 Drivers' championship ===
Rank	No.	Driver	TAI (Japan)	FUJ (Japan)	SUG (Japan)	SEP (Malaysia)	FUJ (Japan)	MOT (Japan)	SUZ (Japan)	MIN (Japan)	Pts.
1	81	(Japan) Nobuyuki Ohyagi (Japan) Takayuki Aoki	12	1	4		1	4	Ret	6	66
2	7	(Japan) Tetsuya Yamano (Japan) Haruhiko Matsumoto	3	5	1		4	7	15	11	54
3	910	(Japan) Hisashi Wada	5	6	2	7	6	10	4	5	54
3	910	(Japan) Jukuchou Sunako	5	6	2		6	10	4	5	54
4	3	(Japan) Yuji Ide (Japan) Masataka Yanagida	6	2	12	1	2	9	2	12	53
5	24	(Japan) Hideshi Matsuda (Japan) Kazuyuki Nishizawa	11	4	5	6	7	3	16	2	49
6	26	(Japan) Atsushi Yogo (Japan) Hideo Fukuyama	4	17	7	4	13	2	3	8	44
7	31	(Japan) Morio Nitta (Japan) Shinichi Takagi	1	3	Ret	3	5	Ret	Ret	17	40
8	77	(Japan) Katsuo Kobayashi (Japan) Tatsuya Tanigawa	2	Ret	3	2	10	6	Ret	Ret	34
9	19	(Japan) Satoshi Goto (Japan) Minoru Tanaka	DNA	16	10		3	1	17	13	33
10	62	(Japan) Shinsuke Shibahara	7	Ret	9	10	11	5	6	4	30
11	62	(Japan) Shogo Mitsuyama			9	10	11	5	6	4	26
12	63	(Japan) "OSAMU" (Japan) Takamasa Nakagawa	9	8	6		17	17	5	7	23
13	86	(Japan) Masaoki Nagashima (Japan) Koji Matsuda	Ret	18	Ret		DNA	18	1	10	21
14	71	(Japan) Guts Jyonai (Japan) Eiichi Tajima	Ret	DNA	Ret		Ret	Ret	11	1	20
15	55	(Japan) Eiji Yamada (Japan) Takayuki Kinoshita	8	9	DNA	8	9	14	DNA	3	19
16	51	(Japan) Naofumi Omoto (Japan) Yasukichi Yamamoto		14	13		8	8	14	9	8
17	0	(Japan) Masahiro Matsunaga (Japan) Kumi Sato	10	11	Ret		Ret	11	7	Ret	5
18	11	(Japan) Junichi Ikura	14	13	8		14	15	9	DNA	5
18	11	(Japan) Yusei Maki		13	8		14	15	9		5
20	62	(Japan) Yasuhisa Fujiwara	7	Ret							4
20	9/2	(Japan) Akira Watanabe	Ret	7			Ret	16	13		4
20	9	(Japan) Yukihiro Hane		7		11					4
23	360	(Japan) Seigo Nishizawa (Japan) Kota Sasaki	16	Ret	Ret	12	Ret	12	8	16	3
24	900	(Sri Lanka) Dilantha Malagamuwa	13	10	14	5	15				1
24	900/901	(Japan) Takeshi Asami	13	10	14			Ret			1
24	70	(Japan) Yoshimi Ishibashi (Japan) Hiroaki Suga	15	12	11	9	12	19	10	14	1
NC	9	(Japan) Tsunefumi Hioki	Ret				Ret	16	12		0
NC	9	(Japan) Yosuke Shimoshima				11			12		0
NC	2	(Japan) Kazuho Takahashi						13	13		0
NC	2	(Japan) Hiroshi Kimura						13			0
NC	11	(Japan) Koji Ushikubo	14							DNA	0
NC	911	(Japan) Masamitsu Ishihara (Japan) Akira Hirakawa		15			16				0
NC	900/901	(Japan) Tetsuya Nakajima					15			15	0
NC	901	(Japan) Tetsuji Tamanaka							Ret	15	0
NC	10	(Japan) Yutaka Yamagishi (Japan) Takahisa Ohno		Ret			18				0
NC	901	(Japan) Yasutaka Hinoi						Ret	Ret		0
NC	900	(Portugal) João Barbosa				5					0
NC	910	(United Kingdom) Adam Wilcox				7					0
NC	65	(Japan) Genji Hashimoto (Hong Kong) Charles Kwan				Ret					0
NC	5	(Malaysia) Key Soon Yue (Malaysia) Ila Ridak				DSQ					0
NC	15	(Hong Kong) Siu Tit Lung (Hong Kong) Siu Yuk Lung				DNR					0
Rank	No.	Driver	TAI (Japan)	FUJ (Japan)	SUG (Japan)	SEP (Malaysia)	FUJ (Japan)	MOT (Japan)	SUZ (Japan)	MIN (Japan)	Pts.

==== GT300 Teams' standings ====
For teams that entered multiple cars, only the best result from each round counted towards the teams' championship.

Rank	Team	No.	TAI (Japan)	FUJ (Japan)	SUG (Japan)	SEP (Malaysia)	FUJ (Japan)	MOT (Japan)	SUZ (Japan)	MIN (Japan)	PTS
1	Team Taisan with Advan	24	11	4	5	6	7	3	16	2	74
1	Team Taisan with Advan	26	4	17	7	4	13	2	3	8	74
2	Team Daishin	81	12	1	4		1	4	Ret	6	66
3	RE Amemiya Racing	7	3	5	1		4	7	15	11	54
4	910 Racing	910	5	6	2	7	6	10	4	5	54
4	910 Racing	911		15			16				54
5	Hasemi Motorsport	3	6	2	12	1	2	9	2	12	53
6	ARTA with A'PEX	31	1	3	Ret	3	5	Ret	Ret	17	40
7	R&D Sport	62	7	Ret	9	10	11	5	6	4	39
7	R&D Sport	63	9	8	6		17	17	5	7	39
8	Cusco Racing	77	2	Ret	3	2	10	6	Ret	Ret	34
9	Racing Project Bandoh	19	DNA	16	10		3	1	17	13	33
10	KRAFT	86	Ret	18	Ret		DNA	18	1	10	21
11	SigmaTec Racing Team	71	Ret	DNA	Ret		Ret	Ret	11	1	20
12	Team Taisan Advan jr.	55	8	9	DNA	8	9	14	DNA	3	19
13	Auto Staff Racing	51		14	13		8	8	14	9	8
14	TOM'S Spirit	0	10	11	Ret		Ret	11	7	Ret	5
15	Team Gainer	11	14	13	8		14	15	9	DNA	5
16	Team Daikokuya	9	Ret	7		11	Ret	16	12		4
17	Dentaire ProJet Racing	360	14	Ret	Ret	12	Ret	12	8	16	3
18	Team Sri Lanka	900	13	10	14	5	15				1
18	Team Gaikokuya	70	15	12	11	9	12	19	10	14	1
NC	Dream28	2						13	13		0
NC	A&S Racing	901						Ret	Ret	15	0
NC	Ability Motorsport	10		Ret			18				0
NC	Amprex Motorsports	65				Ret					0
NC	BSA Porsche Team Competizione	5				DSQ					0
NC	BSA Porsche Team Competizione	15				DNR					0
Rank	Team	No.	TAI (Japan)	FUJ (Japan)	SUG (Japan)	SEP (Malaysia)	FUJ (Japan)	MOT (Japan)	SUZ (Japan)	MIN (Japan)	PTS
