= Hideshi Matsuda =

Japanese car racer and TV reporter (born 1954)

- 松田 秀士
- Born: 22 December 1954 (age 71); Kōchi, Kōchi, Japan
- Occupations: Television personality Car racer
- Years active: 1985–present
- Relatives: Takeshi Kitano (brother-in-law)

Hideshi Matsuda (松田 秀士, Matsuda Hideshi; born 22 December 1954) is a Japanese car racer and TV reporter. He is the brother-in-law of Beat Takeshi.

== Racing career ==
Matsuda has most notably raced 20 seasons of Super GT from 1993-2012, and also raced in six seasons of Super Formula (then Japanese Formula 2) from 1985 to 1991. He has also raced in several 24-hour races, including Daytona and LeMans, four times in the Indianapolis 500, in 1994-1996 and 1999, usually for Beck Motorsports, and raced in three CART Championship Car races, one of which at Twin Ring Motegi in his native Japan.

== Racing record ==
=== Indy Car World Series / CART ===
Year	Team	Chassis	Engine	1	2	3	4	5	6	7	8	9	10	11	12	13	14	15	16	17	18	19	Rank	Points	Ref
1994	Dick Simon Racing	Lola T93	Ford XB	SRF	PHX	LBH	INDY; 24	MIL	DET	POR	CLE	TOR	MIS	MDO	NHM	VAN	ROA	NZR	LS				51st	0	
1995	Beck Motorsports	Lola T94	Ford XB	MIA	SRF	PHX	LBH	NZR	INDY; 15	MIL	DET	POR	ROA	TOR	CLE	MIS	MDO	NHM	VAN	LS			36th	0	
1998	Della Penna Motorsports	Swift 009.c	Ford XB	MIA	MOT; 18	LBH	NZR	RIO	STL	MIL	DET	POR	CLE	TOR	MIS	MDO	ROA	VAN	LS	HOU	SRF	FON	34th	0	

=== Indy Racing League ===
Year	Team	Chassis	No.	Engine	1	2	3	4	5	6	7	8	9	10	11	Rank	Points	Ref
1996	Beck Motorsports	Lola T94	52	Ford Cosworth	WDW	PHX	INDY; 8									30th	27	
1998	Beck Motorsports	Dallara IR8	54	Infiniti	WDW	PHX	INDY; DNQ	TEX	NHS	DOV	CLT	PIK	ATL	TEX	LSV	-	0	
1999	Beck Motorsports	Dallara IR9	54	Oldsmobile Aurora V8	WDW	PHX	CLT	INDY; 10	TEX	PIK	ATL	DOV	PIK	LSV	TEX	34th	20	
2000	Hubbard-Immke Racing	Dallara	20	Oldsmobile Aurora V8	WDW	PHX	LSV	INDY; DNQ	TEX	PIK	ATL	KTY	TEX			-	0	

=== Indy 500 results ===
Year	Chassis	Engine	Start	Finish
1994	Lola	Ford-Cosworth	14th	24th
1995	Lola	Ford-Cosworth	20th	15th
1996	Lola	Ford-Cosworth	30th	8th
1998	Dallara	Infiniti	Failed to Qualify	
1999	Dallara	Oldsmobile	10th	10th
2000	Dallara	Oldsmobile	Failed to Qualify	

=== Complete JGTC/Super GT results ===
Year	Team	Car	Class	1	2	3	4	5	6	7	8	9	DC	Pts
1993	Chamberlain Engineering	Lotus Esprit	LM GT4	FUJ	FUJ	SUZ; Ret	FUJ						NC	0
1994	Makiguchi Engineering	BMW M3	GT2	FUJ	SEN	FUJ	SUG; 2						12th	15
1994	Team Taisan	Ferrari F40	GT1					MIN; 8					21st	3
1995	Team Taisan	Porsche 911 GT2	GT1	SUZ; Ret	FUJ; 1	SEN; 8	FUJ; 5	SUG; 6	MIN; 1				4th	57
1996	Team Taisan	Porsche 911 GT2	GT500	SUZ; 9	FUJ; 9	SEN; Ret	FUJ; 12	SUG; 12	MIN; 6				15th	10
1997	Team Taisan	Porsche 911 GT2	GT500	SUZ	FUJ	SEN; 10	FUJ; Ret	MIN; 14	SUG; 8				23rd	6
1998	Team Taisan	Dodge Viper	GT500	SUZ; 14	FUJ; C	SEN	FUJ; 14	MOT	MIN	SUG; 10			21st	1
1999	Team Taisan	Dodge Viper	GT500	SUZ; 9	FUJ; 13	SUG	MIN; 13						23rd	2
1999	Team Taisan	Porsche 911 GT3 R	GT300					FUJ; 1	TAI; Ret	MOT; 1			8th	40
2000	Team Taisan	Porsche 911 GT3 R	GT300	MOT; 1	FUJ; 1	SUG	FUJ; 7	TAI; 7	MIN; 1	SUZ; 2			2nd	83
2001	Team Taisan	Porsche 911 GT3 R	GT300	TAI; 11	FUJ; 4	SUG; 5	FUJ; 7	MOT; 3	SUZ; 16	MIN; 2			5th	49
2002	910 Racing	Porsche 911 GT3 RS	GT300	TAI; 8	FUJ; 4	SUG; Ret	SEP; 4	FUJ; 6	MOT; 8	MIN; 2	SUZ; 5		6th	55
2003	Team Gainer	Ferrari F360	GT300	TAI; 13	FUJ; 4	SUG; Ret	FUJ; 2	FUJ; 20	MOT; Ret	AUT; 2	SUZ; 12		8th	46
2004	Team Gainer	Ferrari F360	GT300	TAI; 10	SUG; 3	SEP; 9	TOK; 8	MOT; 20	AUT; 7	SUZ; 14			8th	26
2005	Jim Gainer Racing	Ferrari F360	GT300	OKA; 13	FUJ	SEP; Ret	SUG; 10	MOT; 5	FUJ	AUT; 19	SUZ; 5		11th	13
2006	Arktech Motorsports	Porsche Boxster	GT300	SUZ; 3	OKA; 3	FUJ; 8	SEP; 9	SUG; 6	SUZ; 10	MOT; 17	AUT; 4	FUJ; Ret	9th	49
2007	Jim Gainer Racing	Ferrari F360	GT300	SUZ; 22	OKA; 16	FUJ; 15			SUZ; DSQ	MOT	AUT	FUJ	26th	2
2007	JLOC	Lamborghini Murciélago RG-1	GT300				SEP; 12	SUG; 9					26th	2
2008	JLOC	Lamborghini Gallardo RG-3	GT300	SUZ; DNQ	OKA; 16	FUJ; 16	SEP; 16	SUG; 19	SUZ; 12	MOT; Ret	AUT; 19	FUJ; 14	NC	0
2009	JLOC	Lamborghini Gallardo RG-3	GT300	OKA; Ret	SUZ; 13	FUJ; 19	SEP; Ret	SUG; 12	SUZ; 10	FUJ; 10	AUT; 12	MOT; 11	25th	2
2010	A speed	Aston Martin V8 Vantage GT2	GT300	SUZ; DSQ	OKA; 15	FUJ; 3	SEP; 12	SUG; 11	SUZ; Ret	FUJ; C	MOT; 23		14th	11
2011	Team Taisan	Porsche 996 GT3	GT300	OKA; 11	FUJ; 12	SEP; 13	SUG	SUZ	FUJ; 15	AUT	MOT; 10		26th	1
2012	JLOC	Lamborghini Gallardo RG-3	GT300	OKA; Ret	FUJ; 14	SEP; DNQ	SUG; 15	SUZ; Ret	FUJ	AUT; 15	MOT		NC	0

=== 24 Hours of Le Mans results ===
Year	Team	Co-Drivers	Car	Class	Laps	Pos.	Class Pos.
2001	(United States) Dick Barbour Racing	(Belgium) Didier de Radiguès (Germany) Sascha Maassen	Reynard 01Q-LM-Judd	LMP675	95	DNF	DNF
