= Takayuki Kinoshita =

Japanese racing driver

- Nationality: Japanese
- Born: 5 May 1960 (age 66)
- Debut season: 1989
- Current team: GAZOO Racing
- Categorisation: FIA Bronze
- Former teams: Team LF-A, Sport Auto, Falken Motorsports, Team Taisan

Takayuki Kinoshita (木下 隆之, Kinoshita Takayuki) is a Japanese racing car driver, author, and automotive journalist. Kinoshita is affiliated with Toyota Motorsport's GAZOO Racing arm, with whom he scored SP8 class wins in the 2010, 2012, and 2014 24 Hours Nürburgring driving the Lexus LFA. He also won A8 class in the 2004 24 Hours Nürburgring driving a Nissan Skyline GT-R (R34) for Falken Motorsports.

Among Japanese drivers, Kinoshita has raced the most times in the 24 Hours Nürburgring. He has also raced in All Japan Grand Touring Car Championship, Japanese Touring Car Championship, Japanese Formula Three, and Super Taikyu N1 Endurance Series.

Kinoshita is a member of the Automotive Journalists Association of Japan and is on the selection committee for Car of the Year Japan. He was also a presenter on the Japanese Best Motoring TV series.

== Results ==
Season Series / Class Standing Team / Car / Races

GT 2013 24h Nürburgring Nordschleife, Class SP 8 »(single race) Gazoo Racing » / Lexus LF-A »

GT 2012 24h Nürburgring Nordschleife, Class SP 8 »(single race) 1st Gazoo Racing » / Lexus LF-A » Class Win

GT 2011 24h Nürburgring Nordschleife, Class SP 8 »(single race) 11th Gazoo Racing » / Lexus LF-A »

GT 2010 24h Nürburgring Nordschleife, Class SP 8 »(single race) 1st Gazoo Racing » / Lexus LF-A » Class Win

GT 2009 24h Nürburgring Nordschleife, Class SP8 »(single race) 4th Gazoo Racing » / Lexus LF-A »

GT 2008 24h Nürburgring Nordschleife, Class SP8 »(single race) 7th Team LF-A » / Lexus LF-A »

GT 2007 24h Nürburgring Nordschleife, Class SP6 »(single race) 6th Sport Auto » / Honda NSX Type-R »

GT 2006 24h Nürburgring Nordschleife, Class SP6 »(single race) Sport Auto » / Honda NSX Type-R »

GT 2005 24h Nürburgring Nordschleife, Class A8 »(single race) Falken Motorsports » / Skyline GT-R (R34) »

GT 2004 24h Nürburgring Nordschleife, Class A8 »(single race) 1st Falken Motorsports » / Skyline GT-R (R34) » Class Win

GT 2003 All-Japan GT Championship, Class GT300 » 19th Team Taisan » / Chrysler Viper GTS-R »(8 of 8 races, 1 Win)

GT 2002 All-Japan GT Championship, Class GT300 » 18th Team Taisan » / Porsche 911 GT3-RS (996) »(1 of 8 races)

GT 2002 All-Japan GT Championship, Class GT300 » Team Taisan » / Chrysler Viper GTS-R »(2 of 8 races)

GT 2002 All-Japan GT Championship, Class GT300 » Amemiya Racing » / Mazda RX-7 (FD) »(1 of 8 races)

GT 2001 All-Japan GT Championship, Class GT300 » 27th Team Taisan » / Chrysler Viper GTS-R »(5 of 7 races)

2000 Japanese GT Series, 24th

1999 Japanese GT Series, 18th

1998 Japanese GT Series, GT300-19th

1997 Japanese GT Series, GT300-13th

1996 Japanese GT Series, GT300-3rd

1995 Japanese GT Series, GT300-11th

1993 Japanese Touringcars

1992 Japanese Touringcars

1991 Japanese Touringcars

1990 Japanese Touringcars

19** Japanese N1 Endurance Series

1989 Japanese Touringcars

19** Japanese Formula 3

=== Complete Spa 24 Hour results ===
Year	Team	Co-Drivers	Car	Class	Laps	Pos.	Class Pos.
1990	(Japan) Team Zexel	(Japan) Kenji Tohira (Belgium) Dirk Schoysman	Nissan Skyline GT-R	N/class5	409	13th	**3rd**
1991	(Japan) Team Zexel	(Belgium) Dirk Schoysman (United Kingdom) Kieth O'dor	Nissan Skyline GT-R	N/Div.4	457	6th	**1st**
1992	(Japan) Nismo	(Belgium) Dirk Schoysman (Spain) Luis Pérez-Sala	Nissan Skyline GT-R	N3.0		DNF	DNF

=== Complete Japanese Touring Car Championship (-1993) results ===
Year	Team	Car	Class	1	2	3	4	5	6	7	8	DC	Pts
1989	Nismo	Nissan Skyline GTS-R	JTC-1	NIS; Ret	SEN; 4	TSU; 8	SUG; 5	SUZ; 3	FUJ; Ret			?	?
1992	Nismo	Nissan Skyline GT-R	JTC-1	AID; 9	**AUT**; 1	SUG; 2	SUZ; 4	MIN; NC	TSU; 3	SEN; 2	FUJ; 1	6th	100

=== Complete JGTC results ===
(key) (Races in bold indicate pole position) (Races in italics indicate fastest lap)

Year	Team	Car	Class	1	2	3	4	5	6	7	8	DC	Pts
1995	Makiguchi Engineering	BMW M3	GT2	SUZ	FUJ	SEN; Ret	FUJ; 1	SUG; Ret	MIN; 2			11th	35
1996	Makiguchi Engineering	BMW M3	GT300	SUZ; 3	FUJ; 4	SEN; 1	FUJ; Ret	SUG; 10	MIN; 4			3rd	53
1997	Hitotsuyama Racing	BMW 318i	GT300	SUZ; Ret								14th	13
1997	Team Daishin	Nissan Silvia	GT300		FUJ; 7	SEN; 6	FUJ; Ret	MIN; Ret	SUG; 8			14th	13
1998	Hitotsuyama Racing	BMW M3	GT300	SUZ	FUJ; C	SEN	FUJ					19th	12
1998	910 Racing	Porsche 993 RSR	GT300					MOT; 3	MIN; Ret	SUG; 14		19th	12
1999	CdmaOne Toyota Team Cerumo with Key's	Toyota Supra	GT500	SUZ; 8	FUJ; 6	SUG; 8	MIN; Ret	FUJ; Ret	TAI; 11	MOT; 15		16th	12
2000	CdmaOne Toyota Team Cerumo with Key's	Toyota Supra	GT500	MOT; 11	FUJ; Ret	SUG; 16	FUJ; 19	TAI; 13	MIN; Ret	SUZ; 10		23rd	1
2001	Team Taisan Advan Jr.	Chrysler Viper GTS-R	GT300	TAI; 8	FUJ; 9	SUG	FUJ; 9	MOT; 14	SUZ	MIN; 3		15th	19
2002	Team Taisan Advan	Porsche 911 GT3-R	GT300	TAI	FUJ; 3							11th	34
2002	Team Taisan Advan Jr.	Chrysler Viper GTS-R	GT300			SUG; 5	SEP; 9	FUJ	MOT	MIN		11th	34
2002	RE Amemiya Racing	Mazda RX-7	GT300								SUZ; 3	11th	34
2003	Team Taisan Advan	Chrysler Viper GTS-R	GT300	TAI; 16	FUJ; 16	SUG; Ret	FUJ; 1	FUJ; 5	MOT; Ret	AUT; 7	SUZ; Ret	12th	34
