= Yukihiro Hane =

Japanese racing driver

Yukihiro Hane (Hane Yukihiro (羽根 幸浩), born August 26, 1962) is a former Japanese racing driver.

== Career ==
Hane is active in automobile racing. He participates in both domestic and overseas races like the Macau Grand Prix and the FIA GT Championship; he was the first Japanese driver to fully participate in the latter.

After his debut, Hane participated in the Japanese Formula 3 Championship. In 1990, he ranked fourth after Naoki Hattori, Naohiro Furuya and Hisashi Wada.

Hane mainly drives Porsches and is well known as a Porsche messenger. At the Japan Touring Car Championship, he drove the Skyline GT-R and performed well in his vehicle without Nissan's support, but Masahiro Hasemi and Hideo Fukuyama won the championship.

== Racing record ==
=== Complete Japanese Touring Car Championship results ===
Year	Team	Car	Class	1	2	3	4	5	6	7	8	9	DC	Pts
1992	Kenji HKS Racing	Nissan Skyline GT-R	JTC-1	TAI; 15	AUT	SUG; 6	SUZ; 5	MIN	TSU; 7	SEN; 6	FUJ; 4		11th	42
1993	HKS Racing Co. Ltd.	Nissan Skyline GT-R	JTC-1	MIN; 9	AUT; Ret	SUG; 1	SUZ; 19	TAI; Ret	TSU; 9	TOK; 3	SEN; 2	FUJ; 4	9th	79

=== Japanese Top Formula Championship results ===
Year	Team	1	2	3	4	5	6	7	8	9	10	DC	Pts
1995	Team Nova	SUZ	FUJ	MIN	SUZ; Ret	SUG	FUJ	TOK	FUJ	SUZ		NC	0
1996	Slim Beauty House Cerumo	SUZ; 16	MIN; Ret	FUJ; Ret	TOK; Ret	SUZ; 13	SUG; Ret	FUJ; 16	MIN; 13	SUZ; 12	FUJ; Ret	NC	0
