= Enthusia Professional Racing =

2005 video game

- North American cover art featuring the Aston Martin Vanquish.
- Developer: Konami
- Publisher: Konami
- Designer: Manabu Akita
- Composers: Masanori Akita; Yuichi Tsuchiya; HAL
- Platform: PlayStation 2
- Release: JP: March 17, 2005; NA: May 3, 2005; PAL: May 6, 2005
- Genre: Sim racing
- Modes: Single-player, multiplayer

Enthusia Professional Racing is a 2005 racing game for the PlayStation 2, made by Konami as their first sim racing title.

== Gameplay ==
Enthusia Professional Racing has five available play modes:

- Enthusia Life (career mode)
- Driving Revolution
- Free Race
- Time Attack
- Versus Racing

=== Enthusia Life ===
As opposed to purchasing vehicles as in the majority of games in the sim racing genre, cars are unlocked by a roulette-style method after completing a race, which determines which opposing car in the race the player unlocks, although in this roulette "no car" is also one of the possibilities.

Instead of purchasing parts to improve cars, a points-based system is used to determine upgrades. When enough of these "Enthu Points" (otherwise known as "Driver HP" in Japan) are obtained, a stat of the car (weight, power, or tires) is upgraded, up to three times each. The game also uses these points to keep track of collisions with walls and cars, or going off course, reducing the player's overall point count in each case. The more points are lost, the less points one gets to upgrade a car.

The driver can also be upgraded in the same way, with the points changing stats such as maximum number of Driver HP or the rate at which they are recovered after a race. If a player runs out of points during a race, the player has to miss the next race. Full HP can be restored by "resting", and a large amount is restored when changing a car.

=== Driving Revolution ===
In this mode players must attempt to pass through gates at the correct speed while accelerating, braking or keeping a constant speed. Points are gained for doing this correctly and enough points must be gained to pass on to the next level.

== Features ==
Promotional material for the game emphasised the accuracy of the game's physics. To demonstrate the accuracy, a video was produced which shows a direct comparison between a Mazda MX5 being driven in Enthusia and its real life counterpart on the same course. It is among the demos that play when the game is left idle on the title screen.

The game's visual effects include a G meter termed "FGS" (which includes a representation of the car's tyres and their grip), a translucent "moving window" g-force effect and a speed blur effect in first person view.

The game's highly detailed car models include additional animated parts for specific cars, such as the retracting spoiler of the Bugatti EB110.

Featured race tracks (of which all but 2 - Tsukuba and Nürburgring Nordschleife - are fictional) include realistic foreground textures, and feature animations such as birds taking off, spinning wind turbines, flowing waterfalls, rivers and fountains, moving car traffic, sand being blown over dunes, and even a full aerobatic demonstration team emitting coloured smoke trails.

Enthusia accurately represents automatic transmissions, taking advantage of the Dualshock 2's pressure-sensitive throttle input to mimic real automatic transmission characteristics.

Enthusia can be used with the Logitech Driving Force, Driving Force Pro, Driving Force GT and G25 steering wheels.

== Reception ==
Reception

Aggregate score
Aggregator	Score
Metacritic	70/100

Review scores
Publication	Score
Edge	5/10
Electronic Gaming Monthly	8.33/10
Eurogamer	6/10
Famitsu	29/40
Game Informer	8/10
GamePro	4/5
GameRevolution	C
GameSpot	7.4/10
GameSpy	3.5/5
GameZone	6.9/10
IGN	7.2/10
Official U.S. PlayStation Magazine	2.5/5
Detroit Free Press	2/4

The game received "average" reviews according to the review aggregation website Metacritic. In Japan, Famitsu gave it a score of one eight and three sevens for a total of 29 out of 40. IGN rated the game 7.2/10, suggesting that the game's enthusiast driving lifestyle would have been more accessible to gamers if it had come out in 2004, but its qualities are dwarfed by the fact that it was released around the same time as Gran Turismo 4.

Based on data provided by Famitsu, the game sold 52,248 copies in Japan during that year.
