= Kazuyuki Nishizawa =

Japanese racing driver

Kazuyuki Nishizawa (西澤 和之 - Nishizawa Kazuyuki; born October 11, 1967) is a Japanese professional racing driver.

== Complete JGTC/Super GT Results ==
(key) (Races in bold indicate pole position) (Races in italics indicate fastest lap)

Year	Team	Car	Class	1	2	3	4	5	6	7	8	9	DC	Pts
2000	MTCI Racing Team	Porsche Boxster	GT300	TRM; 11	FSW; Ret	SUG; 5	FSW; 13	TAI; 13	MIN; 8	SUZ; 9			15th	13
2001	Team Taisan Advan	Porsche 911 GT3R	GT300	TAI; 11	FSW; 4	SUG; 5	FSW; 7	TRM; 3	SUZ; Ret	MIN; 2			5th	49
2002	Team Taisan Advan	Porsche 911 GT3R	GT300	TAI; 5	FSW	SUG; 7	SEP; 10	FSW; 7	TRM; 3	MIN; 3	SUZ; 17		9th	42
2003	Team Taisan Advan	Porsche 911 GT3R	GT300	TAI; 2	FSW; 1	SUG; 8	FSW; 6	FSW; 4	TRM; Ret	AUT; 3	SUZ; 9		**3rd**	**72**
2006	Team Taisan Advan	Porsche 911 GT3R	GT300	SUZ	OKA; 8	FSW; 7	SEP	SUG	SUZ	TRM	AUT	FSW; 8	24th	10
2007	Team Taisan with Nishizawa	Porsche 911 GT3R	GT300	SUZ	OKA	FSW	SEP; 13	SUG	SUZ; Ret	TRM	AUT	FSW	NC	0
