= Tsukuba Circuit =

Motorsport track in Japan

- Location: Shimotsuma, Ibaraki, Japan
- Coordinates: 36°09′6″N 139°55′17″E
- Capacity: 8,500
- Broke ground: 1966
- Opened: 22 June 1970; 55 years ago
- Major events: Current: MFJ Superbike; Tsukuba Time Attack Challenge; Former: Japanese F3 (1994–2004); JTCC (1985–1994)

Car Circuit (1970–present)
- Length: 2.045 km (1.271 mi)
- Turns: 12
- Race lap record: 0:52.149 ( (Brazil) Fábio Carbone, Dallara F304, 2004, F3)

Bike Circuit (1990–present)
- Length: 2.070 km (1.286 mi)
- Turns: 13

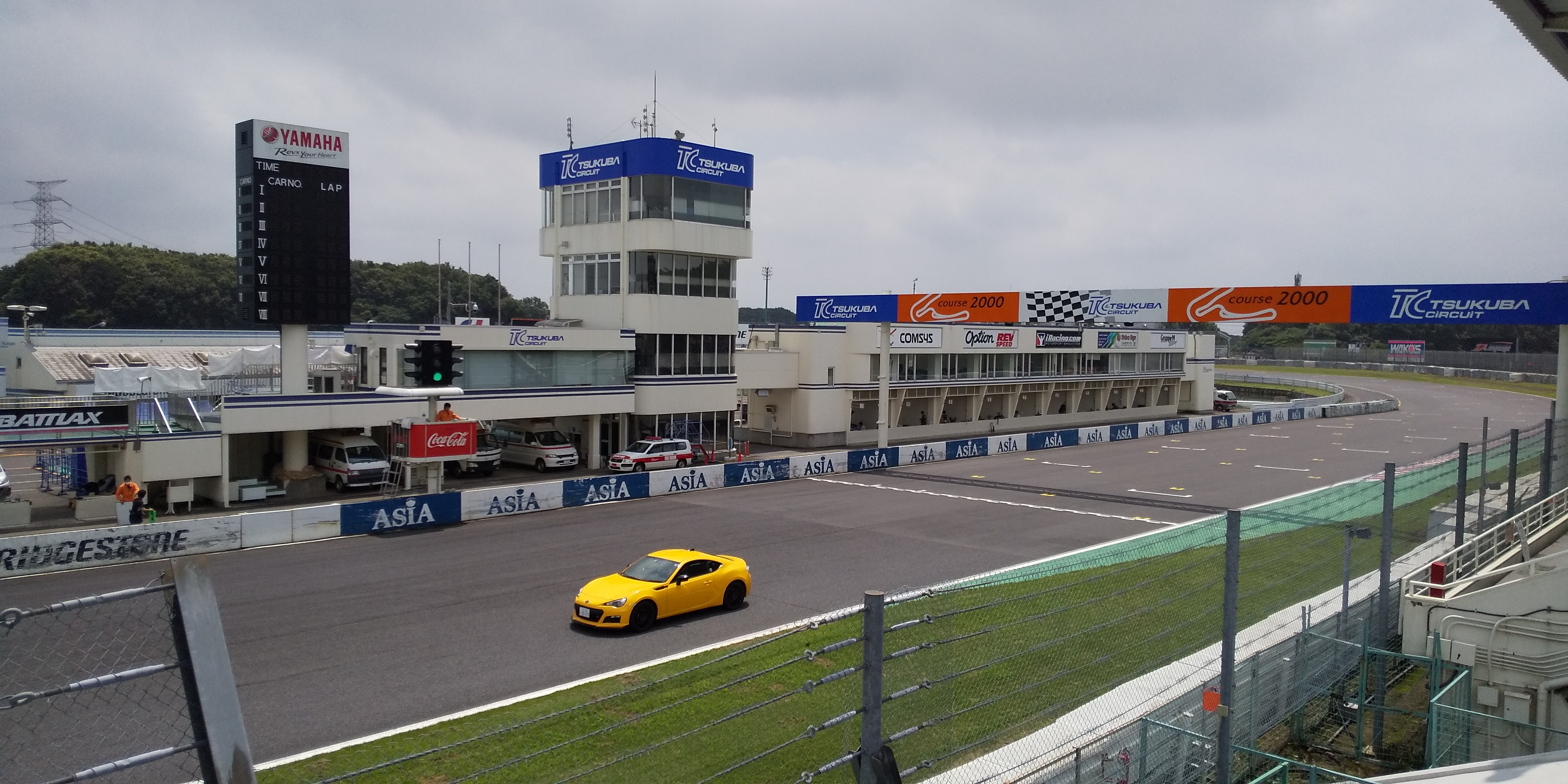
Home straight of Tsukuba Circuit

Tsukuba Circuit (筑波サーキット, Tsukuba Sākitto) is a motorsport race track located in Shimotsuma, a neighboring city of Tsukuba, Ibaraki Prefecture, Japan, about 60 km (37 mi) north of central Tokyo. It is 2.045 km (1.271 mi) long, with 32 pit garages and a 437 m (0.272 mi) long back straight. There is a small chicane used only for motorcycle racing that increases the track's total length to 2.070 km (1.286 mi).

The track was established in 1966 with the aim of attracting young people to participate in motor sports, but was not actually completed until 1970. At the present time, an event is held every week. The track has a large variety of corners, ranging from wide sweepers to hairpins. The circuit accommodates 8500 spectators on the track, 3000 in the stands, 5000 on lawn seats, and 500 standing over the pits.

The illustration of the course guide shows that there are various courses other than the main course.

- Course 1000

In 2001, the minibike course that had been called the "East Course" was completely renovated and opened as Course 1000 (TC1000), which is almost 1,000 meters in circumference. The TC1000 is a safe course that is open to cars and motorcycles, and features excellent visibility, making it ideal for beginners.

- Gymkhana track

The trapezoid-shaped area just outside the last corner of the main course is the Gymkhana track. Gymkhana is a popular motor sport in Japan, and the All Japan Gymkhana Championships are held by JAF. Practice sessions and Gymkhana competitions are held at the Gymkhana track.

- Oval Course

The Oval Course, located between the first corner and the second hairpin of the main course, is a course for training Auto Race drivers. Auto Race is a unique form of public gambling motor sport in Japan.

Admission is free on weekdays and ¥500 on weekends, but only when there are no scheduled events. The gas station in the paddock sells original Tsukuba Circuit souvenirs and other items. Across from the No.1 pit in the paddock, there is a small restaurant. The most popular menu item is the set meal of stewed motsu(Motsu-Teishoku). Visitors are allowed to drive on the track with a license. Tsukuba Circuit is not convenient to public transportation, so it is best accessed by a private car. The nearest station can only provide access via lengthy taxi ride.

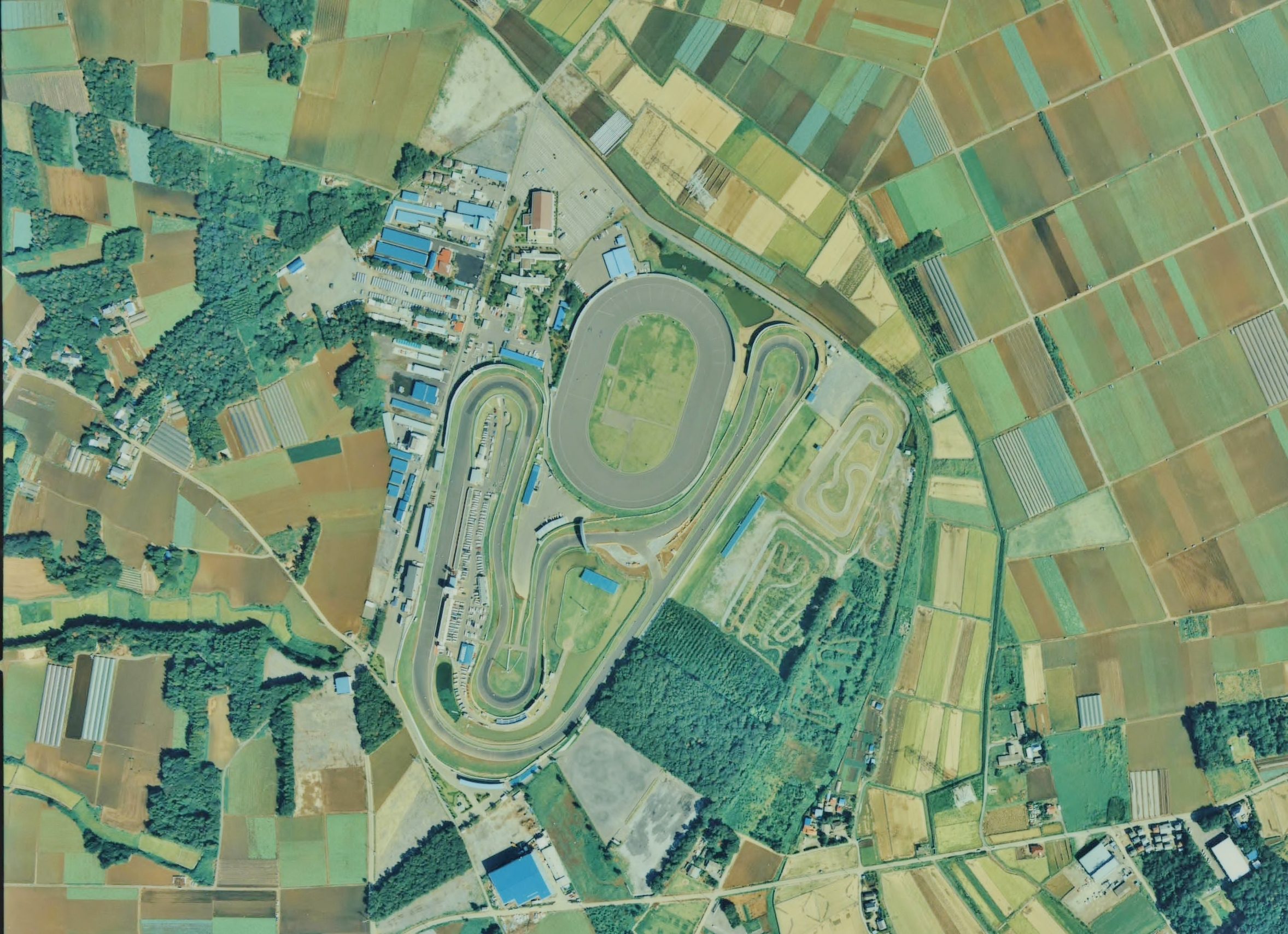
A satellite image of Tsukuba Circuit in 1990

== Time Attack ==
Tsukuba's "Time Attack" event (alternatively known as Super Lap or Tuner Battles) originated in Japan when the tuning media organized the event on race circuits such as Tsukuba, as a proving ground for street tuned cars built at a large budget by highly respected tuning companies. As a result of the quick rise in popularity, tuners developed specialized cars to beat the competition, including the purpose-built HKS CT230R Lancer Evolution with a body made entirely out of carbon fibre.

Unlike other timed motorsport disciplines such as sprinting and hillclimbing, the car is required to start off under full rolling start conditions following a warm-up lap, where they will have to accelerate out as fast as possible to determine how fast they enter their timed lap. Commonly, as competing cars consist of modified road-going models, that are required to wear tires authorized for road use. Although as time attack cars have gotten fast, due to safety concerns with aerodynamic loads, slicks in faster classes are now common place.

On 27 January 2023 Yoshiki 'Fire' Ando with the Escort Drag Racing Service Mitsubishi Lancer Evolution IX became the first driver to break through the 50-second barrier at Tsukuba. This was the first time that a tuner car with a production chassis had gone sub-50 seconds on street semi-slick tires. HKS and Nobuteru Taniguchi had gone sub-50 seconds before Ando, with a time of 49.445 seconds and a top speed of 238.253 km/h in the HKS Toyota 86 TRB-03 on slick tires. However, this was largely disputed as a traditional tuner car record since it was set on slick tires. HKS maintains a time of 50.259 seconds in the TRB-03 on traditional semi-slick street tires.

=== Time Attack top 50 rankings ===
The following is the top 50 ranking for tuning cars on street tires, as of 17 February 2024:

Pos	Team	Driver	Car	Time (s)	Top speed (km/h)	Drivetrain
1	HKS	Nobuoteru 'NOB' Taniguchi	Toyota 86 (HKS TRB-03)	49.445	238.253	FR
2	Escort Drag Racing Service	Yoshiki 'Fire' Ando	Mitsubishi Lancer Evolution IX	49.897	253.938	4WD
3	Scorch Racing / ADVAN	Tomohiko 'Under' Suzuki	Nissan Silvia (S15)	50.366	243.847	FR
4	Qartoumy Racing	Feras Qartoumy	Chevrolet Corvette (C6)	51.231	242.642	FR
5	Top Fuel Drag & Street Shop	Nobuoteru 'NOB' Taniguchi	Honda S2000 (AP1)	51.762	233.060	FR
6	Garage G-Force	Nobuoteru 'NOB' Taniguchi	Mitsubishi Lancer Evolution IX	52.391	223.927	4WD
7	AutoBahn / Joyo	Kunihiko Bando	Toyota Soarer (JZZ30)	52.454	248.447	FR
8	PZ Tuning / Vibrant Performance	Will Au-Yeung	Honda Civic (FG4)	53.071	237.781	FF
9	Esprit	Nobuoteru 'NOB' Taniguchi	Honda NSX (NA1)	53.474	239.734	MR
10	Car Shop Dream / KJM / Vortex	Testuhiro Kurokawa	Mazda RX-7 (FD3S)	53.489	225.894	FR
11	Arvou	Yusaku Shibata	Honda S2000 (AP1)	53.571	210.608	FR
12	HKS	Nobuoteru 'NOB' Taniguchi	Mitsubishi Lancer Evolution IX (HKS CT230R)	53.589	228.xxx	4WD
13	Revolution	Yasushi Kikuchi	Mazda RX-7 (FD3S)	53.673	225.894	FR
14	Friends Racing	Toru Inose	Nissan Silvia (S15)	53.821	223.602	FR
15	Seyamax Admix	Kyushu Danji	Honda NSX (NA1)	53.915	219.601	MR
16	Autobahn / Joyo	Kunihiko Bando	Nissan Skyline GT-R (BCNR33)	54.010	246.070	4WD
17	RGN CTA	Daisuke Aoki	Mazda RX-7 (FD3S)	54.035	205.950	FR
18	Kyushu Danji / Tomiyoshi Racing	Tsutomu Hanita	Honda NSX (NA2)	54.101	222.635	MR
19	Garage S Complete	Mitsuyoshi Nishio	Nissan Onevia	54.124	234.324	FR
20	DLanguage	Yasushi Kikuchi	Subaru Impreza R205 (GR)	54.115	225.282	4WD
21	ATTKD Super	Mitsuhiro Kinoshita	Nissan Skyline GT-R (BNR32)	54.145	232.909	4WD
22	Sakamoto Engineering	Hiroki Sakamoto	Mazda RX-7 (FD3S)	54.252	225.282	FR
23	Garage HRS / Sun Automobile	Tarzan Yamada	Mitsubishi Lancer Evolution VII (CyberEVO)	54.392		4WD
24	ARIOS Okuyama	Yoshiaki Itagaki	Mazda RX-7 (FD3S)	54.476	206.936	FR
25	M Speed	Tetsuya Tanaka	Nissan Skyline GT-R (BNR34)	54.481		4WD
26	Endless / ADVAN	Atsushi Shimaya	Mazda RX-7 (FD3S)	54.483	212.014	FR
27	Wacky Mate	Masayoshi Kato	Nissan Skyline GT-R (BNR32)	54.571	239.150	4WD
28	TFR Mukaishima	Kiyotaka Ejima	Mazda RX-7 (FD3S)	54.585	224.439	FR
29	ADMIX / SHORIN / CHEMITEC	Shoichiro Masumoto	Nissan Skyline GT-R (BNR32)	54.828	233.817	4WD
30	Exceed Moat	Tsumotu Hirokoshi	Nissan 240SX S14	54.882	230.868	FR
31	JDMYard / Hardrace	Adam Casmiri	Honda Civic (EG6)	54.901	241.827	FF
32	DKOS GG-R	Aso Daimajin	Nissan Skyline GT-R (BNR34)	54.917	224.859	4WD
33	RACK / INTEC	Takataka	Subaru Impreza (GF8)	55.071	210.158	4WD
34	Auto Rescue Izu / Scoot Sports	Yasuhiro 'Yabatan' Ando	Mazda RX-7 (FD3S)	55.109	213.65	FR
35	Moty's t-one	Kazuyuki '01.t' Takahashi	Mazda RX-7 (FD3S)	55.237	214.328	FR
36	Panspeed	Kota Sasaki	Mazda RX-7 (FD3S)	55.320	212.976	FR
37	Ti Racing	Tomohiro Ido	Lotus Exige S2	55.402	217.962	MR
38	Phoenix Power	Yui Tsutsumi	Nissan GTR (R35)	55.455	237.885	4WD
39	Nobuemon / Joyo	Nobuemon	Toyota Supra (JZA80)	55.458	233.615	FR
40	HKS	Nobuoteru 'NOB' Taniguchi	Suzuki Swift (HKS TRB-04)	55.498	227.225	FF
41	M's Machine Works	Yuta Uemura	Porsche Cayman (987)	55.509	205.089	MR
42	Wacky Mate	Kengo 'Lock' Suzuki	Mazda RX-7 (FD3S)	55.510	221.538	FR
43	Full Stage / ENDLESS	Hiroyuki 'Shark' Iiri	Mazda RX-7 (FD3S)	55.595	200.632	FR
44	Anshin / Lucas Oil	Anshin Manabe	Nissan Skyline GT-R (BNR32)	55.811	239.521	4WD
45	Ti Racing	Tomohiro Ido	Lotus Exige S2	55.824		MR
46	Racing Project Bandoh	Manabu "Max" Orido	Toyota GT86 (ZN6)	55.927	212.797	FR
47	R-Magic Pink	Mitsuhiro Kinoshita	Mazda RX-7 (FD3S)	55.947	217.742	FR
48	GNR Racing / Garage Rise-Up	Koji Asai	Honda Civic (EK9)	55.964	201.831	FF
49	JUN	Mitsuhiro Kinoshita	Mitsubishi Lancer Evolution V	55.976		4WD
50	BT Racing	Ootori	Mitsubishi Lancer Evolution IV	55.979	197.08	4WD
51	Yellow Factory / RF KEW	Ryo Kaneko	Honda Civic (EG6)	55.984	187.826	FF
52	New Type Racing	Nyan	Mazda RX-7 (FD3S)	56.015	237.102	FR

== Lap records ==
The outright all-time unofficial track record is 0:50.230 seconds, set by Kazuyoshi Hoshino in a March 792 Formula Two car, during qualifying for the 1979 Tsukuba Champions race. As of April 2004, the fastest official race lap records at the Tsukuba Circuit are listed as:

Category	Time	Driver	Vehicle	Event
Car Circuit (1970–present): 2.045 km (1.271 mi)
Formula Three	0:52.149	Fábio Carbone	Dallara F304	2004 Tsukuba Japanese F3 round
Formula Toyota	0:54.942	Mitsuharu Kawazu	Tom's FT20	2001 Tsukuba Formula Toyota round
Group A	0:58.726	Kazuyoshi Hoshino	Nissan Skyline GT-R BNR32	1992 Tsukuba JTCC round
Super Touring	1:06.357	Tetsuya Tanaka	Honda Civic Ferio	1994 Tsukuba JTCC round

== In popular culture ==
Tsukuba Circuit has appeared in numerous video games, including iRacing, Forza Motorsport, 2, 3, and 4, Gran Turismo 4, PSP, 5, 6, 7 and Sport, Tourist Trophy, Enthusia Professional Racing, rFactor, and D1 Grand Prix.

The track is commonly used for tuner events and has appeared in the final installment of the Shuto Kousoku Trial series, SKT Max. The circuit has also gained popularity because of its use by Best Motoring to test and race a variety of vehicles.
