= Mooncraft Shiden 77 =

Japanese racing car

Mooncraft Shiden 77 Mooncraft Shiden Kai
- Category: Group 6 Fuji Grand Champion
- Constructor: Mooncraft (Ito Racing)
- Designer(s): Takuya Yura; Motoyasu Moriwaki; Akihiko Ogura

Technical specifications
- Chassis: Aluminum
- Suspension (front): Double wishbone
- Suspension (rear): Same as front
- Length: 4,500 mm (177.2 in)
- Width: 1,950 mm (76.8 in)
- Height: 800 mm (31.5 in)
- Engine: BMW M12/7 1,991 cc I4 DOHC; Mazda RE13B 1,308 cc 2-rotor Mid-engined, longitudinally mounted
- Transmission: Hewland FG400 5-speed manual
- Weight: 670 kg (1,477 lb)
- Tyres: Bridgestone (1977); Dunlop (1978)

Competition history
- Notable entrants: Takahara Racing; Shizumatsu Racing
- Notable drivers: (Japan) Noritake Takahara; (Japan) Masanori Sekiya; (Japan) Takashi Yorino
- Debut: 1977 Fuji Grand 250km
- Last season: 1978 500 mile Fuji
Races	Wins	Poles	F/Laps
8	0	0	0
- Constructors' Championships: 0
- Drivers' Championships: 0

The Mooncraft Shiden 77 (Japanese: ムーンクラフト・紫電７７, Hepburn: Mūnkurafuto Shiden 77) was a Group 6 sports prototype racing car introduced by Mooncraft in 1977.

== Etymology ==
The Shiden 77 was named after the Kawanishi N1K World War II fighter plane, nicknamed the "Shiden", and for its year of introduction, 1977.

== Specifications ==
The Shiden 77 was a sports prototype race car designed by Mooncraft. It featured an aluminum twin-tube monocoque chassis and a body structure intended for competition in the Fuji Grand Champion Series. The car was powered by a BMW M12/7 2.0 L inline-four engine, prominently used in touring cars and in Formula 2. The car would later use a Mazda Mazda RE13B 1.3 L two-rotor engine.

The vehicle was built by Ito Racing. It featured double wishbone front and rear suspension. The body was formed using molds made of fibre-reinforced plastic.

== Racing history ==
Development on the Shiden 77 commenced in summer 1976. The project was overseen by Akihiko Ogura, with Takuya Yura in charge of styling and Motoyasu Moriwaki in charge of engineering the vehicle. Ito Racing would build the car. Yura designed the car's livery.

The car was completed in March 1977, with Noritake Takahara selected to drive the car in the Fuji Grand Champion Series; Takahara was a three-time champion of the Grand Champion Series and a two-time All-Japan Formula 2000 champion. The Shiden 77's first race was at the 1977 Fuji Grand 250km in June 1977, replacing the March 74S he had used in the first round. Despite running as high as 6th, the Shiden 77 retired due to brake issues after twelve laps. After this race, Takahara replaced his Shiden 77 with a Chevron B36.

The Shiden 77 would then be returned to Mooncraft and rebuilt extensively, becoming what was known as the Shiden Kai (Japanese: ムーンクラフト・紫電改, Hepburn: Mūnkurafuto Shiden Kai). The Shiden Kai featured a heavily modified replica March chassis and a Mazda rotary engine, along with numerous other modifications from the Shiden 77 such as an open top.

The Shiden Kai would be entered in the 1978 Fuji Grand Champion Series, with Takahara being selected to drive the car again; results did not improve, with the car remaining unclassified, 35 laps down on Kazuyoshi Hoshino's winning March 74S. Takahara also competed in the Fuji Long Distance Series as well, driving the Shiden Kai alongside Takashi Yorino in the first round of the championship.

Following the first Fuji Grand Champion race of the year, Takahara replaced the Shiden Kai with a replica March chassis, while the Shiden Kai was loaned to Shizumatsu Racing in the Grand Champion Series, to be driven by series debutant Masanori Sekiya. In his first race with the Shiden Kai, Sekiya retired after 11 laps; he would finish the next two races in tenth and eighth respectively. Sekiya also competed in the Long Distance Series, taking over from Takahara but still without success. In the 1978 500 mile Fuji, the final round of the Long Distance Series, Sekiya crashed the Shiden Kai and retired from the race; the car burst into flames and was destroyed as a result.

== Legacy ==
Mooncraft would later create the Shiden MC/RT-16, a closed-cockpit prototype race car based on a Riley MkXI chassis for use in Super GT; it was raced in the series by Cars Tokai Dream28 from 2006 to 2012 when rule changes were enacted to prevent low-volume cars from competing in the series from 2013 onwards. The Shiden is said to be a "modern recreation" of the Shiden 77 for modern competition and achieved the constructor's title in 2007.

A fully-functioning replica of the Shiden 77 was constructed in the mid-2000s by Mooncraft; it is built around a FJ1600 chassis and uses a Subaru EA71 engine. A second fully-functioning replica of the Shiden 77 was constructed by Mooncraft from 2018 to 2019. The car was exhibited at the 2018 Suzuka Sound of Engine but without an engine as it was not installed in time for the event. This replica is based on a West Racing Cars VIVACE-7 chassis and uses a Toyota 4A-GE engine. A shakedown test for the second replica was conducted in November 2020.

Tomy produced a 1/62 scale model of the Shiden 77 for their Tomica miniature car model lineup, sold from 1978 to 1981.
