= 2007 Super GT Series =

15th season of sports car racing series

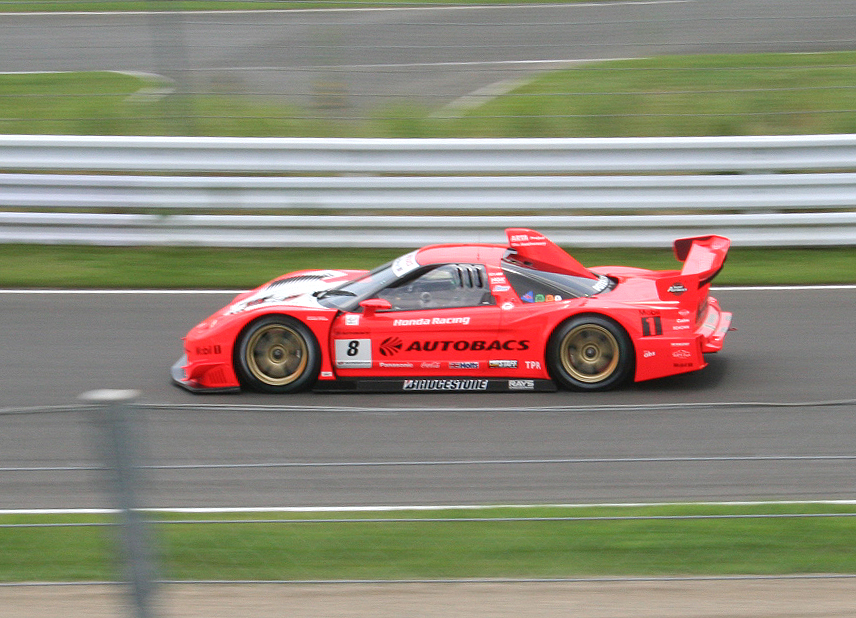
GT500 champions, #8 ARTA Honda NSX.

GT300 drivers' champions #101 Toy Story Racing Toyota MR-S

The 2007 Autobacs Super GT Series was the fifteenth season of the Japan Automobile Federation Super GT Championship including the All Japan Grand Touring Car Championship (JGTC) era and the third season as the Super GT series. It is also marked as the twenty-fifth season of a JAF-sanctioned sports car racing championship dating back to the All Japan Sports Prototype Championship. It is a series for Grand Touring race cars divided into two categories: GT500 and GT300. This was the final season for the 350Z, as it was announced by Nissan and Nismo near the end of the season that the new R35 GT-R would be replacing it the following season. The season began on March 18 and ended on November 4, 2007, after 9 races.

In the GT500 class, ARTA drivers Ralph Firman and Daisuke Itō won the championship in a dominating fashion, becoming the first GT500 champion to clinch the title before the final race of the season, a feat only matched by the 2012 champions Masataka Yanagida and Ronnie Quintarelli as of the end of the 2018 season. In the GT300 class, Kazuya Oshima and Hiroaki Ishiura in the apr Toyota MR-S won the driver's championship title by winning the tiebreaker against the Shiden of Kazuho Takahashi and Hiroki Katoh - the two teams finished the season with the same number of points, but Oshima and Ishiura had two race wins compared to Takahashi and Katoh's one. Takahashi and Katoh's overall consistency, however, would gave Cars Tokai Dream28 the team's championship title by six points over Oshima and Ishiura.

== Drivers and teams ==
=== GT500 ===
Team	Make	Car	Engine	No.	Drivers	Tyre	Rounds
Houzan Toyota Team TOM'S	Lexus	Lexus SC430 GT500	Lexus 3UZ-FE 4.5 L V8	1	(Japan) Juichi Wakisaka	B	All
Houzan Toyota Team TOM'S	Lexus	Lexus SC430 GT500	Lexus 3UZ-FE 4.5 L V8	1	(Germany) André Lotterer	B	All
Houzan Toyota Team TOM'S	Lexus	Lexus SC430 GT500	Lexus 3UZ-FE 4.5 L V8	1	(United Kingdom) Oliver Jarvis	B	6
Hasemi Motorsport	Nissan	Nissan Fairlady Z GT500	Nissan VK45DE 4.5 L V8	3	(France) Sébastien Philippe	B	All
Hasemi Motorsport	Nissan	Nissan Fairlady Z GT500	Nissan VK45DE 4.5 L V8	3	(Japan) Masataka Yanagida	B	All
Forum Engineering Toyota Team LeMans	Lexus	Lexus SC430 GT500	Lexus 3UZ-FE 4.5 L V8	6	(Japan) Tatsuya Kataoka	B	All
Forum Engineering Toyota Team LeMans	Lexus	Lexus SC430 GT500	Lexus 3UZ-FE 4.5 L V8	6	(Sweden) Björn Wirdheim	B	All
Autobacs Racing Team Aguri	Honda	Honda NSX GT500	Honda C32B 3.5 L V6	8	(Republic of Ireland) Ralph Firman	B	All
Autobacs Racing Team Aguri	Honda	Honda NSX GT500	Honda C32B 3.5 L V6	8	(Japan) Daisuke Itō	B	All
Autobacs Racing Team Aguri	Honda	Honda NSX GT500	Honda C32B 3.5 L V6	8	(Japan) Yuji Ide	B	6
Team Impul	Nissan	Nissan Fairlady Z GT500	Nissan VK45DE 4.5 L V8	12	(Japan) Kazuki Hoshino	B	All
Team Impul	Nissan	Nissan Fairlady Z GT500	Nissan VK45DE 4.5 L V8	12	(France) Benoît Tréluyer	B	1–4, 6–9
Team Impul	Nissan	Nissan Fairlady Z GT500	Nissan VK45DE 4.5 L V8	12	(France) Jérémie Dufour	B	5–6
Rolling Stone Real Racing	Honda	Honda NSX GT500	Honda C32B 3.5 L V6	17	(Japan) Katsutomo Kaneishi	B	All
Rolling Stone Real Racing	Honda	Honda NSX GT500	Honda C32B 3.5 L V6	17	(Japan) Toshihiro Kaneishi	B	All
Rolling Stone Real Racing	Honda	Honda NSX GT500	Honda C32B 3.5 L V6	17	(Japan) Takuya Izawa	B	6
Dome Racing Team	Honda	Honda NSX GT500	Honda C32B 3.5 L V6	18	(Japan) Ryō Michigami	B	All
Dome Racing Team	Honda	Honda NSX GT500	Honda C32B 3.5 L V6	18	(Japan) Takashi Kogure	B	All
Nismo	Nissan	Nissan Fairlady Z GT500	Nissan VK45DE 4.5 L V8	22	(Germany) Michael Krumm	B	All
Nismo	Nissan	Nissan Fairlady Z GT500	Nissan VK45DE 4.5 L V8	22	(Japan) Tsugio Matsuda	B	All
Nismo	Nissan	Nissan Fairlady Z GT500	Nissan VK45DE 4.5 L V8	23	(Japan) Satoshi Motoyama	B	All
Nismo	Nissan	Nissan Fairlady Z GT500	Nissan VK45DE 4.5 L V8	23	(United Kingdom) Richard Lyons	B	All
Nismo	Nissan	Nissan Fairlady Z GT500	Nissan VK45DE 4.5 L V8	23	(Japan) Hironobu Yasuda	B	6
Kondo Racing	Nissan	Nissan Fairlady Z GT500	Nissan VK45DE 4.5 L V8	24	(Brazil) João Paulo de Oliveira	Y	All
Kondo Racing	Nissan	Nissan Fairlady Z GT500	Nissan VK45DE 4.5 L V8	24	(Japan) Seiji Ara	Y	All
Toyota Team Tsuchiya	Lexus	Lexus SC430 GT500	Lexus 3UZ-FE 4.5 L V8	25	(Japan) Takeshi Tsuchiya	Y	All
Toyota Team Tsuchiya	Lexus	Lexus SC430 GT500	Lexus 3UZ-FE 4.5 L V8	25	(Japan) Manabu Orido	Y	All
Epson Nakajima Racing	Honda	Honda NSX GT500	Honda C32B 3.5 L V6	32	(France) Loïc Duval	D	All
Epson Nakajima Racing	Honda	Honda NSX GT500	Honda C32B 3.5 L V6	32	(Brazil) Fabio Carbone	D	All
Bandai Toyota Team Kraft	Lexus	Lexus SC430 GT500	Lexus 3UZ-FE 4.5 L V8	35	(Japan) Naoki Hattori	D	All
Bandai Toyota Team Kraft	Lexus	Lexus SC430 GT500	Lexus 3UZ-FE 4.5 L V8	35	(United Kingdom) Peter Dumbreck	D	1–3, 6–9
Bandai Toyota Team Kraft	Lexus	Lexus SC430 GT500	Lexus 3UZ-FE 4.5 L V8	35	(Italy) Ronnie Quintarelli	D	4–6
ZENT Toyota Team Cerumo	Lexus	Lexus SC430 GT500	Lexus 3UZ-FE 4.5 L V8	38	(Japan) Toranosuke Takagi	B	All
ZENT Toyota Team Cerumo	Lexus	Lexus SC430 GT500	Lexus 3UZ-FE 4.5 L V8	38	(Japan) Yuji Tachikawa	B	All
Denso Toyota Team SARD	Lexus	Lexus SC430 GT500	Lexus 3UZ-FE 4.5 L V8	39	(Portugal) André Couto	B	All
Denso Toyota Team SARD	Lexus	Lexus SC430 GT500	Lexus 3UZ-FE 4.5 L V8	39	(Japan) Katsuyuki Hiranaka	B	All
Raybrig Team Kunimitsu	Honda	Honda NSX GT500	Honda C32B 3.5 L V6	100	(Germany) Dominik Schwager	B	All
Raybrig Team Kunimitsu	Honda	Honda NSX GT500	Honda C32B 3.5 L V6	100	(Japan) Shinya Hosokawa	B	All

=== GT300 ===
Team	Make	Car	Engine	No.	Drivers	Tyre	Rounds
Honda Cars Tokai Dream28	Mooncraft	Mooncraft Shiden	Toyota 1UZ-FE 4.4 L V8	2	(Japan) Kazuho Takahashi	Y	All
Honda Cars Tokai Dream28	Mooncraft	Mooncraft Shiden	Toyota 1UZ-FE 4.4 L V8	2	(Japan) Hiroki Katoh	Y	All
Honda Cars Tokai Dream28	Mooncraft	Mooncraft Shiden	Toyota 1UZ-FE 4.4 L V8	2	(Japan) Hiroki Yoshimoto	Y	6
Ebbro Team Nova	Vemac	Vemac RD350R	Zytek ZV348 3.9 L V8	4	(Japan) Tetsuya Tanaka	Y	1–4, 6–9
Ebbro Team Nova	Vemac	Vemac RD350R	Zytek ZV348 3.9 L V8	4	(Japan) Shinsuke Yamazaki	Y	1–4, 6–9
Ebbro Team Nova	Vemac	Vemac RD350R	Zytek ZV348 3.9 L V8	4	(Japan) Akira Watanabe	Y	6
Team Mach	Vemac	Vemac RD320R	Honda C32B 3.4 L V6	5	(Japan) Tetsuji Tamanaka	K	All
Team Mach	Vemac	Vemac RD320R	Honda C32B 3.4 L V6	5	(Japan) Hironori Takeuchi	K	All
Team Mach	Vemac	Vemac RD320R	Honda C32B 3.4 L V6	5	(Japan) Keita Sawa	K	6
RE Amemiya Racing	Mazda	Mazda RX-7	Mazda RE20B 2.0 L 3-rotor	7	(Japan) Hiroyuki Iiri	Y	All
RE Amemiya Racing	Mazda	Mazda RX-7	Mazda RE20B 2.0 L 3-rotor	7	(Japan) Ryo Orime	Y	All
RE Amemiya Racing	Mazda	Mazda RX-7	Mazda RE20B 2.0 L 3-rotor	7	(Japan) Naoya Yamano	Y	6
A&S Racing	Mosler	Mosler MT900R	Chevrolet LS1 6.0 L V8	9	(Japan) "OSAMU"	D	1–3, 6, 9
A&S Racing	Mosler	Mosler MT900R	Chevrolet LS1 6.0 L V8	9	(Japan) Guts Jyonai	D	1–3
A&S Racing	Mosler	Mosler MT900R	Chevrolet LS1 6.0 L V8	9	(Japan) Masaki Tanaka	D	5–8
A&S Racing	Mosler	Mosler MT900R	Chevrolet LS1 6.0 L V8	9	(Japan) Katsuhiko Tsutsui	D	5–9
Jim Gainer Racing	Ferrari	Ferrari 360	Ferrari F131B 3.6 L V8	11	(Japan) Masayuki Ueda	Y	All
Jim Gainer Racing	Ferrari	Ferrari 360	Ferrari F131B 3.6 L V8	11	(Japan) Hideshi Matsuda	Y	1–3, 6
Jim Gainer Racing	Ferrari	Ferrari 360	Ferrari F131B 3.6 L V8	11	(Japan) Ichijo Suga	Y	4–9
Endless Sports	Nissan	Nissan Fairlady Z	Nissan VQ35DE 3.5 L V6	13	(Japan) Tomonobu Fujii	Y	All
Endless Sports	Nissan	Nissan Fairlady Z	Nissan VQ35DE 3.5 L V6	13	(Japan) Masami Kageyama	Y	All
Racing Project Bandoh	Toyota	Toyota Celica	Toyota 3S-GTE 2.0 L Turbo I4	19	(Japan) Akira Iida	Y	All
Racing Project Bandoh	Toyota	Toyota Celica	Toyota 3S-GTE 2.0 L Turbo I4	19	(Japan) Yuhi Sekiguchi	Y	All
Team Taisan with Nishizawa	Porsche	Porsche 996 GT3-RS	Porsche M96/77 3.6 L F6	26	(Japan) Nobuteru Taniguchi	Y	All
Team Taisan with Nishizawa	Porsche	Porsche 996 GT3-RS	Porsche M96/77 3.6 L F6	26	(Japan) Shinichi Yamaji	Y	1–3
Team Taisan with Nishizawa	Porsche	Porsche 996 GT3-RS	Porsche M96/77 3.6 L F6	26	(Japan) Kazuyuki Nishizawa	Y	4, 6
Team Taisan with Nishizawa	Porsche	Porsche 996 GT3-RS	Porsche M96/77 3.6 L F6	26	(Germany) Dominik Farnbacher	Y	5–9
apr	Toyota	Toyota MR-S	Toyota 2GR-FSE 3.5 L V6	31	(Japan) Kyosuke Mineo	M	All
apr	Toyota	Toyota MR-S	Toyota 2GR-FSE 3.5 L V6	31	(Japan) Yuya Sakamoto	M	All
apr	Toyota	Toyota MR-S	Toyota 2GR-FSE 3.5 L V6	101	(Japan) Hiroaki Ishiura	M	All
apr	Toyota	Toyota MR-S	Toyota 2GR-FSE 3.5 L V6	101	(Japan) Kazuya Oshima	M	All
Hankook KTR	Porsche	Porsche 997 GT3-RSR	Porsche M97/80 3.8 L F6	33	(Japan) Mitsuhiro Kinoshita	H	2–9
Hankook KTR	Porsche	Porsche 997 GT3-RSR	Porsche M97/80 3.8 L F6	33	(Japan) Yuya Sakamoto	H	2–9
Autobacs Racing Team Aguri	ASL	ASL ARTA Garaiya	Nissan VQ35DE 3.5 L V6	43	(Japan) Morio Nitta	M	All
Autobacs Racing Team Aguri	ASL	ASL ARTA Garaiya	Nissan VQ35DE 3.5 L V6	43	(Japan) Shinichi Takagi	M	All
MOLA	Nissan	Nissan Fairlady Z	Nissan VQ35DE 3.5 L V6	46	(Japan) Kota Sasaki	D	All
MOLA	Nissan	Nissan Fairlady Z	Nissan VQ35DE 3.5 L V6	46	(Japan) Naoki Yokomizo	D	All
MOLA	Nissan	Nissan Fairlady Z	Nissan VQ35DE 3.5 L V6	47	(Japan) Shogo Mitsuyama	D	All
MOLA	Nissan	Nissan Fairlady Z	Nissan VQ35DE 3.5 L V6	47	(Japan) Shigekazu Wakisaka	D	All
DHG Racing	Ford	Ford GT	DHG D35806V 3.5 L V8	55	(Japan) Daisuke Ikeda	Y	1–3, 5–9
DHG Racing	Ford	Ford GT	DHG D35806V 3.5 L V8	55	(Japan) Taku Bamba	Y	1–3, 5–9
DHG Racing	Ford	Ford GT	DHG D35806V 3.5 L V8	55	(Japan) Hideo Fukuyama	Y	6
Willcom R&D Sport	Vemac	Vemac RD408R	Mugen MF458S 4.5 L V8	62	(Japan) Shinsuke Shibahara	Y	All
Willcom R&D Sport	Vemac	Vemac RD408R	Mugen MF458S 4.5 L V8	62	(Japan) Haruki Kurosawa	Y	All
JLOC	Lamborghini	Lamborghini Gallardo RG-3	Lamborghini 07L1 5.0 L V10	66	(Japan) Naohiro Furuya	Y	All
JLOC	Lamborghini	Lamborghini Gallardo RG-3	Lamborghini 07L1 5.0 L V10	66	(Japan) Muneyuki Kurihara	Y	All
JLOC	Lamborghini	Lamborghini Gallardo RG-3	Lamborghini 07L1 5.0 L V10	66	(Japan) Atsushi Yogo	Y	6
JLOC	Lamborghini	Lamborghini Gallardo RG-3	Lamborghini 07L1 5.0 L V10	67	(Japan) Tsubasa Kurosawa	Y	All
JLOC	Lamborghini	Lamborghini Gallardo RG-3	Lamborghini 07L1 5.0 L V10	67	(Japan) Hisashi Wada	Y	All
JLOC	Lamborghini	Lamborghini Gallardo RG-3	Lamborghini 07L1 5.0 L V10	67	(Japan) Yasutaka Hinoi	Y	6
JLOC	Lamborghini	Lamborghini Murciélago RG-1	Lamborghini L535 6.0 L V12	87	(Japan) Yasutaka Hinoi	Y	1–5, 9
JLOC	Lamborghini	Lamborghini Murciélago RG-1	Lamborghini L535 6.0 L V12	87	(Japan) Atsushi Yogo	Y	1–5, 9
JLOC	Lamborghini	Lamborghini Murciélago RG-1	Lamborghini L535 6.0 L V12	87	(Japan) Yoshihisa Namekata	Y	6
JLOC	Lamborghini	Lamborghini Murciélago RG-1	Lamborghini L535 6.0 L V12	88	(Japan) Koji Yamanishi	Y	1–5, 9
JLOC	Lamborghini	Lamborghini Murciélago RG-1	Lamborghini L535 6.0 L V12	88	(Italy) Marco Apicella	Y	1–3, 9
JLOC	Lamborghini	Lamborghini Murciélago RG-1	Lamborghini L535 6.0 L V12	88	(Japan) Hideshi Matsuda	Y	4–5
Team Gaikokuya	Porsche	Porsche 996 GT3-RS	Porsche M96/97 3.6 L F6	70	(Japan) Hiroshi Koizumi	Y	1–3, 5–6
Team Gaikokuya	Porsche	Porsche 996 GT3-RS	Porsche M96/97 3.6 L F6	70	(Japan) Kazuyoshi Takamizawa	Y	1
Team Gaikokuya	Porsche	Porsche 996 GT3-RS	Porsche M96/97 3.6 L F6	70	(Japan) Yoshimi Ishibashi	Y	2–3, 5–6, 9
Team Gaikokuya	Porsche	Porsche 996 GT3-RS	Porsche M96/97 3.6 L F6	70	(Japan) Akazame Oyaji	Y	6, 9
Team Gaikokuya	Porsche	Porsche 996 GT3-RS	Porsche M96/97 3.6 L F6	71	(Japan) Yoshimi Ishibashi	Y	7–8
Team Gaikokuya	Porsche	Porsche 996 GT3-RS	Porsche M96/97 3.6 L F6	71	(Japan) Hirofumi Takei	Y	7
Team Gaikokuya	Porsche	Porsche 996 GT3-RS	Porsche M96/97 3.6 L F6	71	(Japan) Yutaka Yamagishi	Y	8
Cusco Racing	Subaru	Subaru Impreza WRX STI	Subaru EJ20 2.0 L Turbo F4	77	(Japan) Tetsuya Yamano	D	All
Cusco Racing	Subaru	Subaru Impreza WRX STI	Subaru EJ20 2.0 L Turbo F4	77	(Japan) Takayuki Aoki	D	All
Yokoyama Racing	Vemac	Vemac RD320R	Honda C32B 3.4 L V6	83	(Japan) Tadao Uematsu	Y	1, 3
Yokoyama Racing	Vemac	Vemac RD320R	Honda C32B 3.4 L V6	83	(Japan) Ryohei Sakaguchi	Y	1, 3
Arktech Motorsports	Porsche	Porsche 986 Boxster	Porsche M96/77 3.6 L F6	110	(Japan) Takuya Kurosawa	Y	1–2
Arktech Motorsports	Porsche	Porsche 986 Boxster	Porsche M96/77 3.6 L F6	110	(Japan) Hidetoshi Mitsusada	Y	1–2
Arktech Motorsports	Porsche	Porsche 986 Boxster	Porsche M96/77 3.6 L F6	110	(Japan) Takuya Kurosawa	K	3–9
Arktech Motorsports	Porsche	Porsche 986 Boxster	Porsche M96/77 3.6 L F6	110	(Japan) Hidetoshi Mitsusada	K	3–9
Arktech Motorsports	Porsche	Porsche 986 Boxster	Porsche M96/77 3.6 L F6	111	(Japan) Yasushi Kikuchi	K	3, 5–6
Arktech Motorsports	Porsche	Porsche 986 Boxster	Porsche M96/77 3.6 L F6	111	(Japan) Takaya Tsubobayashi	K	3–6
Arktech Motorsports	Porsche	Porsche 986 Boxster	Porsche M96/77 3.6 L F6	111	(Japan) Guts Jyonai	K	5–6
Arktech Motorsports	Porsche	Porsche 986 Boxster	Porsche M96/77 3.6 L F6	112	(Japan) Hiroshi Koizumi	K	7–9
Arktech Motorsports	Porsche	Porsche 986 Boxster	Porsche M96/77 3.6 L F6	112	(Japan) Yasushi Kikuchi	K	7
Arktech Motorsports	Porsche	Porsche 986 Boxster	Porsche M96/77 3.6 L F6	112	(Japan) Guts Jyonai	K	8–9
Tomei Sports	Porsche	Porsche 996 GT3-RS	Porsche M96/77 3.6 L F6	118	(Japan) Takashi Miyamoto	Y	1, 3, 8–9
Tomei Sports	Porsche	Porsche 996 GT3-RS	Porsche M96/77 3.6 L F6	118	(Japan) Shozo Tagahara	Y	1, 3
Tomei Sports	Porsche	Porsche 996 GT3-RS	Porsche M96/77 3.6 L F6	118	(Japan) Takashi Ohi	Y	8–9
Mario Racing	Porsche	Porsche 996 GT3-RSR	Porsche M96/73 3.6 L F6	333	(Japan) Takashi Inoue	Y	1–3
Mario Racing	Porsche	Porsche 996 GT3-RSR	Porsche M96/73 3.6 L F6	333	(Japan) Katsuo Kobayashi	Y	1–3
Team Uematsu	Vemac	Vemac RD320R	Honda C32B 3.4 L V6	333	(Japan) Tadao Uematsu	Y	4–7, 9
Team Uematsu	Vemac	Vemac RD320R	Honda C32B 3.4 L V6	333	(Japan) Takashi Inoue	Y	4, 6
Team Uematsu	Vemac	Vemac RD320R	Honda C32B 3.4 L V6	333	(Japan) Ryohei Sakaguchi	Y	5–6, 9
Avanzza Bomex	Vemac	Vemac RD320R	Honda C32B 3.4 L V6	666	(Japan) Shogo Suho	K	All
Avanzza Bomex	Vemac	Vemac RD320R	Honda C32B 3.4 L V6	666	(Japan) Junichiro Yamashita	K	All
Avanzza Bomex	Vemac	Vemac RD320R	Honda C32B 3.4 L V6	666	(Japan) Masato Shimoyama	K	6

== Schedule ==
Round	Race	Circuit	Date
1	(Japan) Suzuka GT 300 km	Suzuka Circuit	March 18
2	(Japan) Okayama GT 300 km	Okayama International Circuit	April 8
3	(Japan) Fuji GT 500 km	Fuji Speedway	May 4
4	Super GT International Series Malaysia	Sepang International Circuit	June 24
5	(Japan) SUGO GT 300 km	Sportsland SUGO	July 29
6	(Japan) International POKKA 1000km	Suzuka Circuit	August 19
7	(Japan) Motegi GT 300 km	Twin Ring Motegi	September 9
8	(Japan) Autopolis GT 300 km	Autopolis	October 14
9	(Japan) Fuji GT 300 km	Fuji Speedway	November 4

== Season Winners ==
Rd	Circuit	GT500 Winning Team	GT300 Winning Team
Rd	Circuit	GT500 Winning Drivers	GT300 Winning Drivers
1	Suzuka	(Japan) #38 Zent Cerumo SC430	(Japan) #13 Endless Advan Senzaikakumei Z
1	Suzuka	(Japan) Yuji Tachikawa (Japan) Toranosuke Takagi	(Japan) Masami Kageyama (Japan) Tomonobu Fujii
2	Okayama	(Japan) #8 ARTA NSX	(Japan) #101 Toy Story Racing apr MR-S
2	Okayama	(Japan) Daisuke Itō (Republic of Ireland) Ralph Firman	(Japan) Kazuya Oshima (Japan) Hiroaki Ishiura
3	Mt. Fuji	(Japan) #23 Xanavi NISMO Z	(Japan) #43 ARTA Garaiya
3	Mt. Fuji	(Japan) Satoshi Motoyama (United Kingdom) Richard Lyons	(Japan) Morio Nitta (Japan) Shinichi Takagi
4	Kuala Lumpur	(Japan) #24 Woodone Clarion Kondo Z	(Japan) #101 Toy Story Racing apr MR-S
4	Kuala Lumpur	(Japan) Seiji Ara (Brazil) João Paulo de Oliveira	(Japan) Kazuya Oshima (Japan) Hiroaki Ishiura
5	Sportsland SUGO	(Japan) #8 Honda Racing ARTA NSX	(Japan) #19 WedsSport Racing Celica
5	Sportsland SUGO	(Japan) Daisuke Itō (Republic of Ireland) Ralph Firman	(Japan) Akira Iida (Japan) Yuhi Sekiguchi
6	Suzuka; Report	(Japan) #1 Toyota houzan TOM'S SC430	(Japan) #2 Privée KENZO Asset Shiden
6	Suzuka; Report	(Japan) Juichi Wakisaka (Germany) André Lotterer (United Kingdom) Oliver Jarvis	(Japan) Kazuho Takahashi (Japan) Hiroki Katoh (Japan) Hiroki Yoshimoto
7	Motegi	(Japan) #18 Takata Dome NSX	(Japan) #26 Yunker-Power Taisan Porsche 996 GT3
7	Motegi	(Japan) Ryō Michigami (Japan) Takashi Kogure	(Japan) Nobuteru Taniguchi (Germany) Dominik Farnbacher
8	Autopolis	(Japan) #8 Honda Racing ARTA NSX	(Japan) #62 Willcom Advan Vemac 408R
8	Autopolis	(Japan) Daisuke Itō (Republic of Ireland) Ralph Firman	(Japan) Shinsuke Shibahara (Japan) Haruki Kurosawa
9	Mt. Fuji	(Japan) #32 Epson Nakajima Racing NSX	(Japan) #26 Yunker-Power Taisan Porsche 996 GT3
9	Mt. Fuji	(France) Loïc Duval (Brazil) Fabio Carbone	(Japan) Nobuteru Taniguchi (Germany) Dominik Farnbacher

== Standings ==
=== GT500 Drivers ===
Scoring system

Position	1st	2nd	3rd	4th	5th	6th	7th	8th	9th	10th
Points	20	15	11	8	6	5	4	3	2	1
Qualifying	3	2	1							
Fastest lap	1	1	1							

- Only the best four results in the first six races would be counted for the championship.
- There were no points awarded for pole position and fastest lap in the final race.

Rank	Driver	No.	SUZ (Japan)	OKA (Japan)	FUJ (Japan)	SEP (Malaysia)	SUG (Japan)	SUZ (Japan)	MOT (Japan)	AUT (Japan)	FUJ (Japan)	Pts.
1	(Republic of Ireland) Ralph Firman (Japan) Daisuke Itō	8	12	1	9	9	1	2	12	1	8	94
2	(Brazil) Fabio Carbone (France) Loïc Duval	32	3	4	Ret	15	3	13	4	9	1	69
3	(Japan) Shinya Hosokawa (Germany) Dominik Schwager	100	Ret	2	5	2	12	4	Ret	2	4	64
4	(Japan) Takashi Kogure (Japan) Ryō Michigami	18	13	7	11	Ret	2	12	1	5	10	63
5	(Germany) Michael Krumm (Japan) Tsugio Matsuda	22	5	3	2	10	Ret	6	2	4	9	63
6	(Germany) André Lotterer (Japan) Juichi Wakisaka	1	7	5	DNS	8	5	1	6	6	6	54
7	(Japan) Yuji Tachikawa (Japan) Toranosuke Takagi	38	1	11	6	4	11	7	14	Ret	4	53
8	(Japan) Satoshi Motoyama (United Kingdom) Richard Lyons	23	2	Ret	1	14	Ret	3	13	12	14	48
9	(Japan) Tatsuya Kataoka (Sweden) Björn Wirdheim	6	4	14	3	9	DNS	9	3	8	16	38
10	(Brazil) João Paulo de Oliveira (Japan) Seiji Ara	24	Ret	15	Ret	1	10	10	5	Ret	5	34
11	(Japan) Kazuki Hoshino	12	11	8	10	3	7	Ret	Ret	Ret	2	34
12	(France) Sébastien Philippe (Japan) Masataka Yanagida	3	10	13	4	7	4	8	11	7	15	30
13	(France) Benoît Tréluyer	12	11	8	10	3		Ret	Ret	Ret	2	30
14	(Japan) Katsutomo Kaneishi (Japan) Toshihiro Kaneishi	17	6	10	Ret	12	Ret	5	7	Ret	3	29
15	(Portugal) André Couto (Japan) Katsuyuki Hiranaka	39	Ret	12	8	13	6	11	10	3	13	21
16	(United Kingdom) Oliver Jarvis	1						1				20
17	(Japan) Manabu Orido (Japan) Takeshi Tsuchiya	25	9	6	Ret	5	8	Ret	8	10	12	20
18	(Japan) Yuji Ide	8						2				15
19	(Japan) Naoki Hattori	35	8	9	7	11	9	Ret	9	11	11	14
20	(Japan) Hironobu Yasuda	23						3				12
21	(United Kingdom) Peter Dumbreck	35	8	9	7			Ret	9	11	11	12
22	(Japan) Takuya Izawa	17						5				6
23	(France) Jérémie Dufour	12					7	Ret				4
24	(Italy) Ronnie Quintarelli	35				11	9	Ret				2
Rank	Driver	No.	SUZ (Japan)	OKA (Japan)	FUJ (Japan)	SEP (Malaysia)	SUG (Japan)	SUZ (Japan)	MOT (Japan)	AUT (Japan)	FUJ (Japan)	Pts.

==== Teams' standings ====
Rank	Team	No.	SUZ (Japan)	OKA (Japan)	FUJ (Japan)	SEP (Malaysia)	SUG (Japan)	SUZ (Japan)	MOT (Japan)	AUT (Japan)	FUJ (Japan)	Pts.
1	Autobacs Racing Team Aguri	8	12	1	9	6	1	2	12	1	8	108
2	Nismo	22	5	3	2	10	Ret	6	2	4	9	85
3	Nakajima Racing	32	3	4	Ret	15	3	13	4	9	1	81
4	Team Kunimitsu	100	Ret	2	5	2	12	4	Ret	2	7	81
5	Toyota Team TOM'S	1	7	5	Ret	8	5	1	6	6	6	78
6	Dome Racing Team	18	13	7	11	Ret	2	12	1	5	10	63
7	Toyota Team Cerumo	38	1	11	6	4	11	7	14	Ret	4	61
8	Nismo	23	2	Ret	1	14	Ret	3	13	12	14	60
9	Forum Eng. Toyota Team LeMans	6	4	14	3	9	Ret	9	3	8	16	56
10	Team Impul	12	11	8	10	3	7	Ret	Ret	Ret	2	49
11	Hasemi Motorsport	3	10	13	4	7	4	8	11	7	15	48
12	Kondo Racing	24	Ret	15	Ret	1	10	10	5	Ret	5	47
13	Rolling Stone Real Racing	17	6	10	Ret	12	Ret	5	7	Ret	3	41
14	Toyota Team Tsuchiya	25	9	6	Ret	5	8	Ret	8	10	12	38
15	Toyota Team SARD	39	Ret	12	8	13	6	11	10	3	13	37
16	Toyota Team Kraft	35	8	9	7	11	9	Ret	9	11	11	32
Rank	Team	No.	SUZ (Japan)	OKA (Japan)	FUJ (Japan)	SEP (Malaysia)	SUG (Japan)	SUZ (Japan)	MOT (Japan)	AUT (Japan)	FUJ (Japan)	Pts.

Colour	Result
Gold	Winner
Silver	Second place
Bronze	Third place
Green	Points classification
Blue	Non-points classification
Blue	Non-classified finish (NC)
Purple	Retired, not classified (Ret)
Red	Did not qualify (DNQ)
Red	Did not pre-qualify (DNPQ)
Black	Disqualified (DSQ)
White	Did not start (DNS)
White	Withdrew (WD)
White	Race cancelled (C)
Blank	Did not practice (DNP)
Blank	Did not arrive (DNA)
Blank	Excluded (EX)

=== GT300 Drivers' championship ===
Rank	Driver	No.	SUZ (Japan)	OKA (Japan)	FUJ (Japan)	SEP (Malaysia)	SUG (Japan)	SUZ (Japan)	MOT (Japan)	AUT (Japan)	FUJ (Japan)	Pts.
1	(Japan) Hiroaki Ishiura (Japan) Kazuya Oshima	101	3	1	3	1	15	14	21	9	2	89
2	(Japan) Kazuho Takahashi (Japan) Hiroki Katoh	2	2	2	5	11	4	1	6	10	3	89
3	(Japan) Shinsuke Shibahara (Japan) Haruki Kurosawa	62	5	8	Ret	14	5	3	2	1	4	76
4	(Japan) Morio Nitta (Japan) Shinichi Takagi	43	18	17	1	Ret	Ret	2	3	5	7	66
5	(Japan) Masami Kageyama (Japan) Tomonobu Fujii	13	1	7	4	6	12	5	23	3	5	59
6	(Japan) Nobuteru Taniguchi	26	11	3	19	13	Ret	Ret	1	8	1	58
7	(Japan) Kota Sasaki (Japan) Naoki Yokomizo	46	13	6	18	3	6	4	24	2	18	48
8	(Germany) Dominik Farnbacher	26					Ret	Ret	1	8	1	46
9	(Japan) Shogo Mitsuyama (Japan) Shigekazu Wakisaka	47	17	14	11	4	2	8	7	4	14	36
10	(Japan) Akira Iida (Japan) Yuhi Sekiguchi	19	14	19	Ret	4	1	12	18	4	16	32
11	(Japan) Koji Yamanishi	88	4	Ret	2	12	9				Ret	29
12	(Italy) Marco Apicella	88	4	Ret	2						Ret	27
13	(Japan) Tetsuya Tanaka (Japan) Shinsuke Yamazaki	4	10	22	10	2		6	10	Ret	8	27
14	(Japan) Hiroki Yoshimoto	2						1				24
15	(Japan) Takuya Kurosawa (Japan) Hidetoshi Mitsusada	110	6	5	Ret	Ret	13	Ret	5	7	10	22
16	(Japan) Tetsuji Tamanaka (Japan) Hironori Takeuchi	5	7	11	12	19	14	Ret	4	18	6	19
17	(Japan) Mitsuhiro Kinoshita (Japan) Yuya Sakamoto	33		10	20	10	3	16	17	11	9	18
18	(Japan) Kyosuke Mineo (Japan) Yuya Sakamoto	31	8	9	6	15	7	7	9	Ret	Ret	18
19	(Japan) Yasutaka Hinoi (Japan) Atsushi Yogo	87	12	4	9	7	DNS				15	14
20	(Japan) Hiroyuki Iiri (Japan) Ryo Orime	7	9	12	8	8	8	11	8	Ret	12	14
21	(Japan) Shinichi Yamaji	26	11	3	19	13						12
22	(Japan) Tetsuya Yamano (Japan) Takayuki Aoki	77	21	13	Ret	5	Ret	Ret	11	14	11	7
23	(Japan) Akira Watanabe	4						6				5
24	(Japan) Tadao Uematsu	83/333	15		7		16	10	12		13	5
25	(Japan) Ryohei Sakaguchi	83/333	15		7		16	10			13	5
26	(Japan) Hideshi Matsuda	11/88	22	16	15	12	9	DSQ				2
27	(Japan) Daisuke Ikeda (Japan) Taku Bamba	55	Ret	15	13		11	9	14	Ret	17	2
28	(Japan) Hideo Fukuyama	55						9				2
29	(Japan) Masayuki Ueda	11/10	22	16	15	18	10	DSQ	13	12	21	1
30	(Japan) Ichijo Suga	11				18	10	DSQ	13	12		1
31	(Japan) Takashi Inoue	333						10	12			1
-	(Japan) Naoya Yamano	7						11				0
-	(Japan) Shogo Suho (Japan) Junichiro Yamashita	666	16	Ret	14	17	18	13	16	Ret	20	0
-	(Japan) Masato Shimoyama	666						13				0
-	(Japan) Katsuhiko Tsutsui	9					Ret	18	15	13	23	0
-	(Japan) Masaki Tanaka	9					Ret	18	15	13		0
-	(Japan) Yoshimi Ishibashi	70/71		20	Ret		DNQ	15	20	16	22	0
-	(Japan) Hiroshi Koizumi	70/112	20	20	Ret		DNQ	15	Ret	17	19	0
-	(Japan) Akazame Oyaji	70						15				0
-	(Japan) Takashi Miyamoto	118	Ret		Ret					15	24	0
-	(Japan) Takashi Ohi	118								15	24	0
-	(Japan) Yasushi Kikuchi	111/112			16		17	Ret	Ret			0
-	(Japan) Takaya Tsubobayashi	111			16			Ret				0
-	(Japan) Katsuo Kobayashi	333/77	19	18	17	16		Ret				0
-	(Japan) Yutaka Yamagishi	71								16		0
-	(Japan) Guts Jyonai	9/111/112	Ret	23	Ret		17	Ret		17	19	0
-	(Japan) Tsubasa Kurosawa (Japan) Hisashi Wada	67	DNP	DNQ	DNQ	DNS	DNQ	17	19	Ret	25	0
-	(Japan) Naohiro Furuya	66/67	DNP	21	Ret	DNS		17	22	Ret	Ret	0
-	(Japan) Osamu Nakajima	9	Ret	23	Ret			18			23	0
-	(Japan) Kazuyoshi Takamizawa	70	20									0
-	(Japan) Hirofumi Takei	71							20			0
-	(Japan) Muneyuki Kurihara	66	DNP	21	Ret	DNS			22	Ret	Ret	0
-	(Japan) Hironobu Yasuda	10									21	0
-	(Japan) Shozo Tagahara	118	Ret		Ret							0
-	(Japan) Kazuyuki Nishizawa	26						Ret				0
-	(Japan) Keita Sawa	5						Ret				0
Rank	Driver	No.	SUZ (Japan)	OKA (Japan)	FUJ (Japan)	SEP (Malaysia)	SUG (Japan)	SUZ (Japan)	MOT (Japan)	AUT (Japan)	FUJ (Japan)	Pts.

==== GT300 Teams' standings ====
Rank	Team	No.	SUZ (Japan)	OKA (Japan)	FUJ (Japan)	SEP (Malaysia)	SUG (Japan)	SUZ (Japan)	MOT (Japan)	AUT (Japan)	FUJ (Japan)	Pts.
1	Cars Tokai Dream28	2	2	2	5	11	4	1	6	10	3	106
2	apr	101	3	1	3	1	15	14	21	9	2	100
3	WILLCOM R&D Sport	62	5	8	Ret	14	5	3	2	1	4	91
4	Endless Sports	13	1	7	4	6	12	5	23	3	5	81
5	Team Taisan with Nishizawa	26	11	3	19	13	Ret	Ret	1	8	1	72
6	Autobacs Racing Team Aguri	43	18	17	1	Ret	Ret	2	3	5	7	72
7	MOLA	46	13	6	18	3	6	4	24	2	18	64
8	MOLA	47	17	14	11	4	2	8	7	4	14	53
9	Racing Project Bandoh	19	14	19	Ret	4	1	12	18	4	16	46
10	Ebbro Team Nova	4	10	22	10	2		6	10	Ret	8	41
11	Arktech Motorsports	110	6	5	Ret	Ret	13	Ret	5	7	10	37
12	JLOC	88	4	Ret	2	12	9				Ret	36
13	apr	31	8	9	6	15	7	7	9	Ret	Ret	35
14	RE Amemiya Racing	7	9	12	8	8	8	11	8	Ret	12	32
15	Team Mach	5	7	11	12	19	14	Ret	4	18	6	32
16	Hankook KTR	33		10	20	10	3	16	17	11	9	31
17	JLOC	87	12	4	9	7	DNS				15	25
18	Cusco Racing	77	21	13	Ret	5	Ret	Ret	11	14	11	17
19	Mario Racing/Team Uematsu	333	19	18	17	16	16	10	12		13	11
20	Jim Gainer Racing	11	22	16	15	18	10	DSQ	13	12		9
21	DHG Racing	55	Ret	15	13		11	9	14	Ret	17	9
22	Yokoyama Racing	83	15		7							8
23	Avanzza Bomex	666	16	Ret	14	17	18	13	16	Ret	20	8
24	A&S Racing	9	Ret	23	Ret		Ret	18	15	13	23	5
25	Team Gaikokuya	70	20	20	Ret		DNQ	15			22	4
26	JLOC	67	DNP	DNQ	DNQ	DNS	DNQ	17	19	Ret	25	3
27	Arktech Motorsports	112							Ret	17	19	3
28	Arktech Motorsports	111			16		17	Ret				2
29	JLOC	66	DNP	21	Ret	DNQ	DNP	DNP	22	Ret	Ret	2
30	Team Gaikokuya	71							20	16		2
31	Tomei Sports	118	Ret		Ret					15	24	2
32	Jim Gainer Racing	10									21	1
Rank	Team	No.	SUZ (Japan)	OKA (Japan)	FUJ (Japan)	SEP (Malaysia)	SUG (Japan)	SUZ (Japan)	MOT (Japan)	AUT (Japan)	FUJ (Japan)	Pts.
