= Hiroki Katoh =

Japanese racing driver

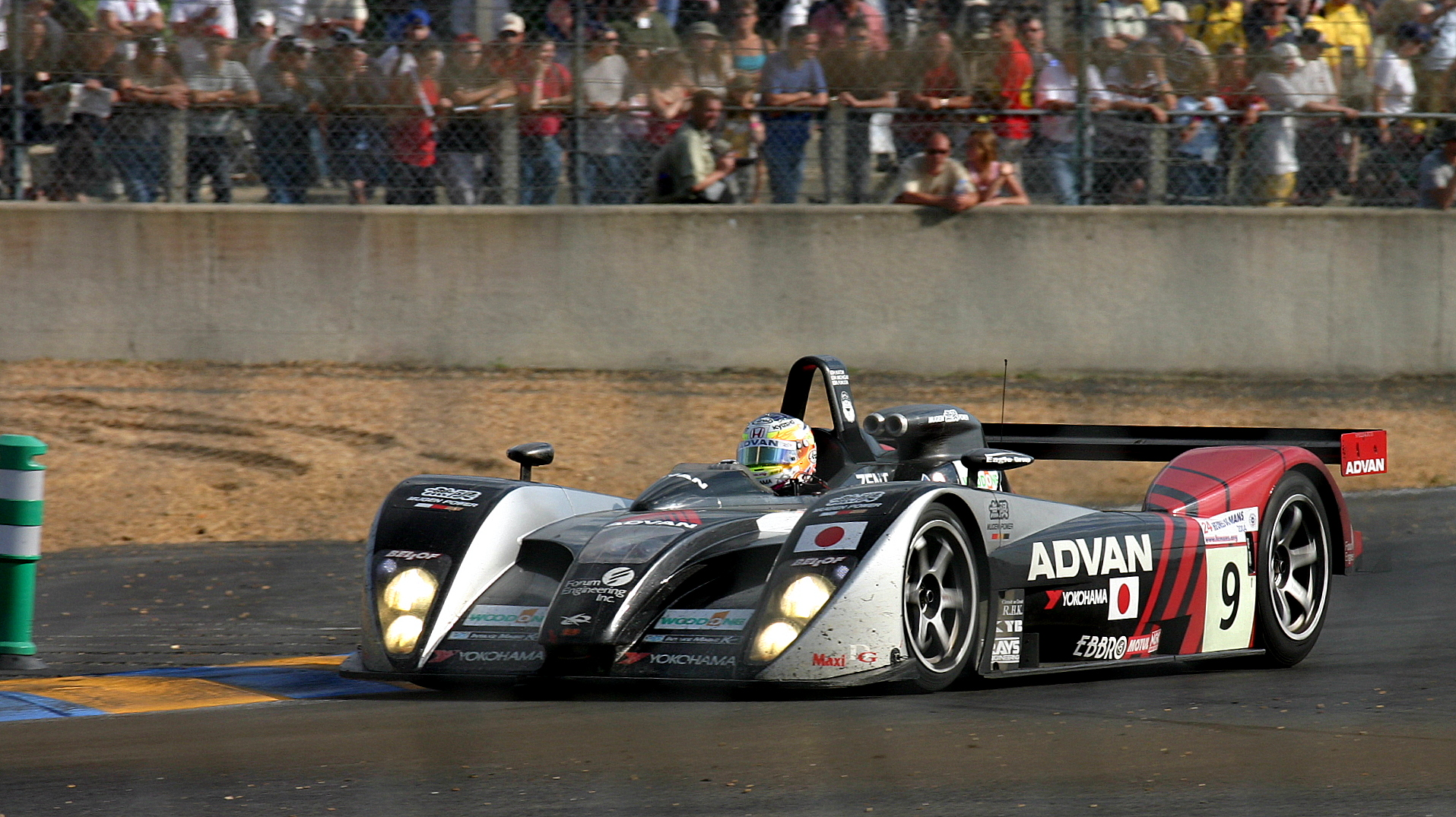
- Dome S101 Mugen driven by Hiroki Katoh, Ryo Michigami & Ryo Fukuda at the 2004 24 Hours of Le Mans
- Nationality: (Japan) Japanese
- Born: 23 February 1968 (age 58) Isehara, Kanagawa, Japan

Super GT career
- Debut season: 1997
- Current team: muta Racing INGING
- Categorisation: FIA Gold (until 2016); FIA Silver (2017–2024); FIA Bronze (2025–)
- Car number: 2
- Former teams: KRAFT, Hitotsuyama Racing, Autobacs Racing Team Aguri, Mugen × Dome Project, Team Kunimitsu with Mooncraft, Racing Project Bandoh, Cars Tokai Dream28
- Starts: 189
- Wins: 7
- Podiums: 22
- Poles: 11
- Fastest laps: 9
- Best finish: 2nd in 2006, 2007

Previous series
- 1994–2005 1999, 2003: Japanese Formula 3 Championship; Formula Nippon
24 Hours of Le Mans career
- Years: 1999–2002, 2004, 2008, 2017
- Teams: Team Goh David Price Racing, Panoz Motorsports, Audi Sport Japan Team Goh, Team Den Blå Avis-Goh, Kondo Racing, Terramos, Clearwater Racing
- Best finish: 5th (2000)
- Class wins: 0

Hiroki Katoh (加藤 寛規, Katō Hiroki; born 23 February 1968) is a Japanese racing driver and team manager.

== Racing career ==
Katoh started karting in 1990 and entered four-wheeled racing in 1992 with Formula Toyota. He would then compete in the Japanese Formula 3 Championship, with a highlight being a sixth place at the Macau Grand Prix. Katoh entered the All Japan Grand Touring Car Championship in 1997 with Kraft and has competed mainly in that series since; his best championship result was a second place with Cars Tokai Dream28 in 2006 and 2007. In 2004, he also won the 12 Hours of Sepang. He has won seven races as of 2023.

In 2021, Cars Tokai Dream28 and INGING merged to form a collaborative entry known as muta Racing INGING; Katoh would drive for the team alongside veteran driver Ryohei Sakaguchi. Katoh stepped back from racing full-time in 2023, becoming the director for muta Racing INGING; he remains in the team as a third driver. In addition to Super GT, Katoh has raced in the 24 Hours of Le Mans multiple times.

Outside of racing, Katoh is an instructor at the Honda Racing School in Suzuka and a driving advisor.

== Racing record ==
=== Formula racing ===
==== Complete Japanese Formula 3 results ====
(key) (Races in bold indicate pole position) (Races in italics indicate fastest lap)

Year	Team	Chassis	Engine	1	2	3	4	5	6	7	8	9	10	11	12	13	14	15	16	17	18	19	20	DC	Points
1994	The Next One	Dallara F393	Mugen MF204 2.0 I4	SUZ	FUJ; 12	TSU; Ret	SUZ; 16	SEN; 14	TOK	MIN; 8	TAI; 10	SUG; 12	SUZ; 7											NC	0
1995	The Next One	Dallara F395	Mugen MF204 2.0 I4	SUZ	FUJ; C	TSU; 6	MIN; 2	SUZ; 6	TAI; 5	SUG; 2	FUJ; 3	SUZ; 3	SEN; 2											3rd	30
1997	Pal Sport	Dallara F397	HKS 4G93 2.0 I4	SUZ	TSU	MIN	FUJ	SUZ; Ret	SUG; 10	SEN; 4	MOT	FUJ	SUZ											12th	3
1998	Toda Racing	Dallara F398	Mugen MF204B 2.0 I4	SUZ; 3	**TSU**; 1	**MIN**; 2	FUJ; 2	MOT; 4	SUZ; 5	SUG; Ret	TAI; 3	SEN; 4	SUG; 2											2nd	38
2005	INGING	Dome F107	Toyota 3S-GE 2.0 I4	MOT; 1	MOT; 2	SUZ; 1	SUZ; 2	SUG; 1; 9	SUG; 2; 6	FUJ; 1	FUJ; 2	OKA; 1	OKA; 2	SUZ; 1	SUZ; 2	MIN; 1	MIN; 2	FUJ; 1	FUJ; 2	MIN; 1	MIN; 2	MOT; 1; 6	MOT; 2; 6	12th	20

==== Complete Formula Nippon results ====
(key) (Races in bold indicate pole position) (Races in italics indicate fastest lap)

Year	Team	1	2	3	4	5	6	7	8	9	10	DC	Points
1999	Shionogi Team Nova	SUZ; Ret	MOT; 10	MIN; Ret	FUJ; 15	SUZ; 10	SUG; 12	FUJ; 12	MIN; Ret	MOT; 7	SUZ; 6	15th	1
2003	Oizumi Team Nova	SUZ	FUJ	MIN	MOT	SUZ	SUG	FUJ	MIN; Ret	MOT; 11	SUZ; 7	NC	0

=== Complete Super GT results ===
(key) (Races in bold indicate pole position) (Races in italics indicate fastest lap)

Year	Team	Car	Class	1	2	3	4	5	6	7	8	9	DC	Points
1997	KRAFT	Toyota MR2	GT300	SUZ; Ret	FUJ; Ret	SEN; Ret	FUJ; 11	MIN; Ret	SUG; 6				21st	6
1998	Hitotsuyama Racing	BMW M3 (E46)	GT300	SUZ; Ret	FUJ	SEN; 5	FUJ; 3	MOT; 5	MIN; 5	SUG; 5			4th	44
1998	Autobacs Racing Team Aguri	Nissan Skyline GT-R GT500	GT500	SUZ	FUJ; C	SEN	FUJ	MOT	MIN	SUG			NC	0
2001	Mugen × Dome Project	Honda NSX GT500	GT500	TAI; 14	FUJ; 15	SUG; 6	FUJ; 15	MOT	SUZ	MIN			22nd	6
2002	Team Kunimitsu with Mooncraft	Honda NSX GT500	GT500	TAI; 9	FUJ	SUG; 2	SEP; 5	FUJ; 8	MOT; 2	MIN; Ret	SUZ; 4		6th	55
2003	Team Kunimitsu with Mooncraft	Honda NSX GT500	GT500	TAI; 7	FUJ; 7	SUG; 16	FUJ; 17	FUJ; 13	MOT; 5	AUT; 9	SUZ; 5		12th	27
2004	Team Kunimitsu with Mooncraft	Honda NSX GT500	GT500	TAI; Ret	SUG; 8	SEP; 15	TOK; 10	MOT; 9	AUT; 10	SUZ; 9			13th	9
2005	Racing Project Bandoh	Toyota Celica	GT300	**OKA**; 7	FUJ; 6	SEP; 7	SUG; 7	MOT; 2	FUJ; 6	AUT; 3	SUZ; 9		7th	54
2006	Cars Tokai Dream28	Mooncraft Shiden	GT300	SUZ; 6	OKA; 11	**FUJ**; 4	**SEP**; 4	SUG; 3	SUZ; 5	MOT; 21	**AUT**; 1	FUJ; 12	2nd	89
2007	Cars Tokai Dream28	Mooncraft Shiden	GT300	SUZ; 2	**OKA**; 2	FUJ; 5	SEP; 11	**SUG**; 4	**SUZ**; 1	MOT; 6	AUT; 10	FUJ; 3	2nd	89
2008	Cars Tokai Dream28	Mooncraft Shiden	GT300	**SUZ**; 2	OKA; 9	FUJ; 3	SEP; 5	SUG; 10	SUZ; Ret	MOT; 2	AUT; 3	FUJ; 11	4th	68
2009	Cars Tokai Dream28	Mooncraft Shiden	GT300	OKA; 6	SUZ; 7	FUJ; 9	SEP; 1	SUG; 2	SUZ; 3	FUJ; 5	AUT; 16	MOT; 16	6th	63
2010	Cars Tokai Dream28	Mooncraft Shiden	GT300	SUZ; Ret	OKA; 2	FUJ; 13	SEP; Ret	**SUG**; 1	SUZ; 18	FUJ; C	MOT; 2		4th	50
2011	Cars Tokai Dream28	Mooncraft Shiden	GT300	OKA; 7	FUJ; Ret	SEP; 10	SUG; 13	SUZ; 6	FUJ; 3	AUT; 4	MOT; 8		10th	32
2012	Cars Tokai Dream28	Mooncraft Shiden	GT300	OKA; 7	FUJ; 2	SEP; DNS	SUG; Ret	SUZ; 15	FUJ; 13	AUT; DNQ	MOT; 16		11th	25
2013	Cars Tokai Dream28	McLaren MP4-12C GT3	GT300	OKA; Ret	FUJ; 18	SEP; 15	SUG; 16	SUZ; 18	FUJ; 14	FUJ; 5	AUT; 11	MOT; 17	25th	3
2014	Cars Tokai Dream28	McLaren MP4-12C GT3	GT300	OKA; 14	FUJ; 7	AUT; 13	SUG; 21	FUJ; 12	SUZ; 12	CHA; 15	MOT; 19		33rd	4
2015	Cars Tokai Dream28	Lotus Evora MC GT300	GT300	OKA; 16	FUJ; Ret	CHA; 11	FUJ; 22	**SUZ**; 7	SUG; Ret	**AUT**; 21	MOT; 13		24th	5
2016	Cars Tokai Dream28	Lotus Evora MC GT300	GT300	OKA; 17	FUJ; 13	SUG; 23	FUJ; Ret	SUZ; Ret	CHA; DNS	MOT; 19	MOT; Ret		NC	0
2017	Cars Tokai Dream28	Lotus Evora MC GT300	GT300	OKA; 26	FUJ; 22	AUT; 24	SUG; Ret	FUJ; 24	SUZ; 23	CHA; 20	MOT; Ret		NC	0
2018	Cars Tokai Dream28	Lotus Evora MC GT300	GT300	OKA; 23	FUJ; 23	SUZ; 13	CHA; 12	FUJ; 20	SUG; Ret	AUT; 21	MOT; 22		NC	0
2019	Cars Tokai Dream28	Lotus Evora MC GT300	GT300	OKA; 14	FUJ; 23	SUZ; 23	CHA; 21	FUJ; 12	AUT; 23	SUG; 17	MOT; 29		NC	0
2020	Cars Tokai Dream28	Lotus Evora MC GT300	GT300	FUJ; 12	FUJ; 1	SUZ; 3	MOT; 13	FUJ; 27	SUZ; 11	MOT; 24	FUJ; 23		10th	31
2021	muta Racing INGING	Lotus Evora MC GT300	GT300	OKA; Ret	FUJ; 10	SUZ; 9	MOT; 1	SUG; 16	AUT; 18	MOT; 24	FUJ; 12		11th	23
2022	muta Racing INGING	Toyota GR86 GT300	GT300	OKA; 20	FUJ; 8	SUZ; 14	FUJ; 18	SUZ; 8	SUG; 1	AUT; 27	MOT; 12		14th	24.5
2023	muta Racing INGING	Toyota GR86 GT300	GT300	OKA	FUJ; 2 (Note: Did not run in race as third driver and therefore ineligible for points)	SUZ; 2	FUJ; 11	SUZ; 7	SUG	**AUT**; 2	MOT		26th	1

* Season still in progress.

=== 24 Hours of Le Mans results ===
Year	Team	Co-Drivers	Car	Class	Laps	Pos.	Class Pos.
1999	(Japan) Team Goh David Price Racing	(Japan) Hiro Matsushita (Japan) Akihiko Nakaya	BMW V12 LM	LMP	223	DNF	DNF
2000	(United States) Panoz Motorsports	(United States) Johnny O'Connell (France) Pierre-Henri Raphanel	Panoz LMP-1 Roadster-S	LMP900	342	5th	5th
2001	(Denmark) Team Den Blå Avis-Goh	(Denmark) John Nielsen (Denmark) Casper Elgaard	Dome S101	LMP900	66	DNF	DNF
2002	Audi Sport Japan Team Goh	(France) Yannick Dalmas (Japan) Seiji Ara	Audi R8	LMP900	358	7th	6th
2004	(Japan) Kondo Racing	(Japan) Ryō Fukuda (Japan) Ryo Michigami	Dome S101	LMP1	206	DNF	DNF
2008	(Japan) Terramos	(Japan) Yojiro Terada (Japan) Kazuho Takahashi	Courage LC70	LMP1	224	NC	NC
2017	(Singapore) Clearwater Racing	(Singapore) Richard Wee (Portugal) Álvaro Parente	Ferrari 488 GTE	LM GTE Am	327	40th	11th
