= Mazda 717C =

Prototype racing car

The Mazda 717C is a prototype racing car built for Mazdaspeed for the 24 Hours of Le Mans under the Group C Junior formula. It was the first race car built by Mazda since the ending of their running in GT with the RX-7 in 1982. It used a 2-rotor 13B Wankel engine, similar to the production engine in the Mazda RX-7.

The bodywork and chassis were actually built by Mooncraft racing with assistance from Mazda.

Two 717Cs were entered at 1983 24 Hours of Le Mans, being the only finishers in the C Junior class and finishing 12th and 18th overall.

The following year the car would be replaced by the 727C. The Yamaha OX99-11 is said to have a similar design to the 717C.
