= CUSCO Japan =

Japanese automotive parts company

CUSCO is a Japanese automotive parts company, specializing in car suspension parts. They are most famous for their coilover suspensions, and are a large presence in the Japanese automotive aftermarket in the domestic Japanese market and around the globe.

A notable product of CUSCO is the "E-CON", a coilover suspension set with electronically controlled dampers.

Cusco sponsored a high performance, RWD mid-engined two-door version of the Subaru WRX STI for professional racing.

== Company Information ==
CUSCO Japan is an automotive company that was started in December 1977. As stated above it is a company specializing in car parts specifically suspension and coilover kits. Its company name is actually Carrosser Co. Ltd with Cusco being one of four brands. The four brands are as follows: Cusco, Vacanza, Carrosser, and Safety21. The President of Operations is Tsutomu Nagase and they are a considerably small company, with only 45 active members as of 2011. They have a capital of 10 Million Yen (roughly 100,000 USD).

== Foreign Expansion and Auto History ==
Cusco have had a history of providing parts for Rallycross races, and even having a Rallycross car represent them in a race. An example would be when they sponsored Subaru. Carrosser is actually the only brand in Japan that has participated in all of the events at the All Japanese Championships.

== Brands ==
The company is divided into 4 separate brands each having a purpose to the company. These brands are Cusco, Vacanza, Carrosser, and Safety21. Each brand plays a part in manufacturing and selling parts for a type of car. Some parts are tested on the track in racing events, and all products are tested in the laboratory.

=== Cusco ===
Cusco is the main brand, responsible for selling generic and racing gears.

=== Vacanza ===
Vacanza manufactures coilover kits and parts for minivans, SUVs (Sports Utility Vehicles), and station wagons. Designed by Carrosser.

=== Carrosser ===
The design philosophy of both Cusco and Vacanza lie in the Carrosser brand. Given authority from the JAF (Japanese Automotive Federation) Carrosser is the competition brand of the company. They participate in all the races of the All Japan Championship, and have gotten sponsorship from Japanese automaker Subaru

=== Safety21 ===
This brand is specifically put into place to manufacture the safety equipment in performance cars. This includes roll cages, bars and guards. They are place through extensive tests both in the laboratory and on the track, to provide the best body and rigidity,

== Super GT/JGTC ==
From 1997 until 2008, Cusco Racing participated in the GT300 class of JGTC (renamed Super GT in 2005) with a Subaru Impreza WRX STI. Cusco Racing made their JGTC debut at the 1997 season finale at Sugo.

in the GT300 class, the team achieved four pole positions and three race wins, one of which in 2008 saw the Subaru Impreza become the first AWD vehicle to take victory in the championships history.

=== Complete JGTC Results ===
(key) (Races in bold indicate pole position) (Races in italics indicate fastest lap)

Year	Car	Tyres	Class	No.	Drivers	1	2	3	4	5	6	7	8	9	Pos	Pts
1997	Subaru Impreza	Y	GT300	77	(Japan) Katsuo Kobayashi (Japan) Naohiro Furuya	SUZ	FUJ	SEN	FUJ	MIN	SUG; Ret	NC1	NC2		NC	0
1998	Subaru Impreza	Y	GT300	77	(Japan) Katsuo Kobayashi (Japan) Hideyuki Tamamoto	SUZ; 8	FUJ; C	SEN; Ret	FUJ; 17	**MOT**; 1	MIN; Ret	SUG; 12	NC1; Ret		10th	23
1999	Subaru Impreza	Y	GT300	77	(Japan) Katsuo Kobayashi (Japan) Tatsuya Tanigawa	SUZ; Ret	FUJ; NC	SUG; 4	MIN; 8	FUJ; 18	OKA; 3	MOT; 6	NC1; 1		8th	31
2000	Subaru Impreza	Y	GT300	77	(Japan) Katsuo Kobayashi (Japan) Tatsuya Tanigawa	MOT; DNA	FUJ; 4	SUG; 3	NC1; 4	FUJ; 5	OKA; Ret	MIN; 6	SUZ; Ret		7th	36
2001	Subaru Impreza	Y	GT300	77	(Japan) Katsuo Kobayashi (Japan) Tatsuya Tanigawa	OKA; 2	FUJ; Ret	SUG; 3	NC1; 2	FUJ; 10	MOT; 6	SUZ; Ret	MIN; Ret		8th	34
2002	Subaru Impreza	Y	GT300	77	(Japan) Katsuo Kobayashi (Japan) Tatsuya Tanigawa	OKA; 7	FUJ; 6	SUG; 2	SEP; 16	FUJ; 5	MOT; 2	MIN; 7	SUZ; Ret		7th	53
2003	Subaru Impreza	Y	GT300	77	(Japan) Katsuo Kobayashi (Japan) Tatsuya Tanigawa	OKA; 10	FUJ; Ret	SUG; 6	FUJ; 24	FUJ; 19	MOT; Ret	AUT; 9	SUZ; Ret		14th	10
2004	Subaru Impreza	Y	GT300	77	(Japan) Katsuo Kobayashi (Japan) Tatsuya Tanigawa	OKA; 14	SUG; 12	SEP; 18	TOK; 6	MOT; 11	AUT; 3	SUZ; 11	NC1; 3	NC2; Ret	9th	17

Note: Non-championship races (NC) do not count towards the championship

=== Complete Super GT results ===
(key) (Races in bold indicate pole position) (Races in italics indicate fastest lap)

Year	Car	No.	Tyres	Class	Drivers	1	2	3	4	5	6	7	8	9	Pos	Points
2005	Subaru Impreza	77	**Y**	GT300	(Japan) Katsuo Kobayashi (Japan) Tatsuya Tanigawa	OKA; 12	FUJ; 21	SEP; 10	SUG; 11	MOT; 13	FUJ; 9	AUT; Ret	SUZ; 13		14th	3
2006	Subaru Impreza WRX STI	77	**Y**	GT300	(Japan) Katsuo Kobayashi (Japan) Tatsuya Tanigawa (Japan) Yasushi Kikuchi	SUZ	OKA	FUJ	SEP	SUG; Ret	SUZ	MOT; 7	AUT; 9	FUJ; 11	20th	6
2007	Subaru Impreza WRX STI	77	**D**	GT300	(Japan) Tetsuya Yamano (Japan) Takayuki Aoki	SUZ; 21	OKA; 13	FUJ; Ret	SEP; 5	SUG; Ret	SUZ; Ret	MOT; 11	AUT; 14	FUJ; 11	18th	17
2008	Subaru Impreza WRX STI	77	**D**	GT300	(Japan) Tetsuya Yamano (Japan) Kota Sasaki (Netherlands) Carlo van Dam	SUZ; 6	OKA; 3	FUJ; 18	**SEP**; 1	SUG; 14	**SUZ**; 17	MOT; 14	AUT; 6	**FUJ**; 3	6th	71
