= 2006 Super GT Series =

Sports car racing season in Japan

The 2006 Autobacs Super GT Series was the fourteenth season of the Japan Automobile Federation Super GT Championship including the All Japan Grand Touring Car Championship (JGTC) era and the second season as the Super GT series. It was also the twenty-fourth season of a JAF-sanctioned sports car racing championship dating back to the All Japan Sports Prototype Championship. The season began on March 19 and ended on November 5, 2006, after 9 races.

Juichi Wakisaka, André Lotterer, and Toyota Team TOM'S won the GT500 drivers' and teams' championships, in the debut season for the new Lexus SC430. Tetsuya Yamano, Hiroyuki Iiri, and RE Amemiya Racing won the GT300 drivers' and teams' championships in their Mazda RX-7. The championship battle was decided on the final lap of the season, with Yamano and Iiri winning the drivers' title on a tiebreaker over Kazuho Takahashi and Hiroki Katoh of Cars Tokai Dream28.

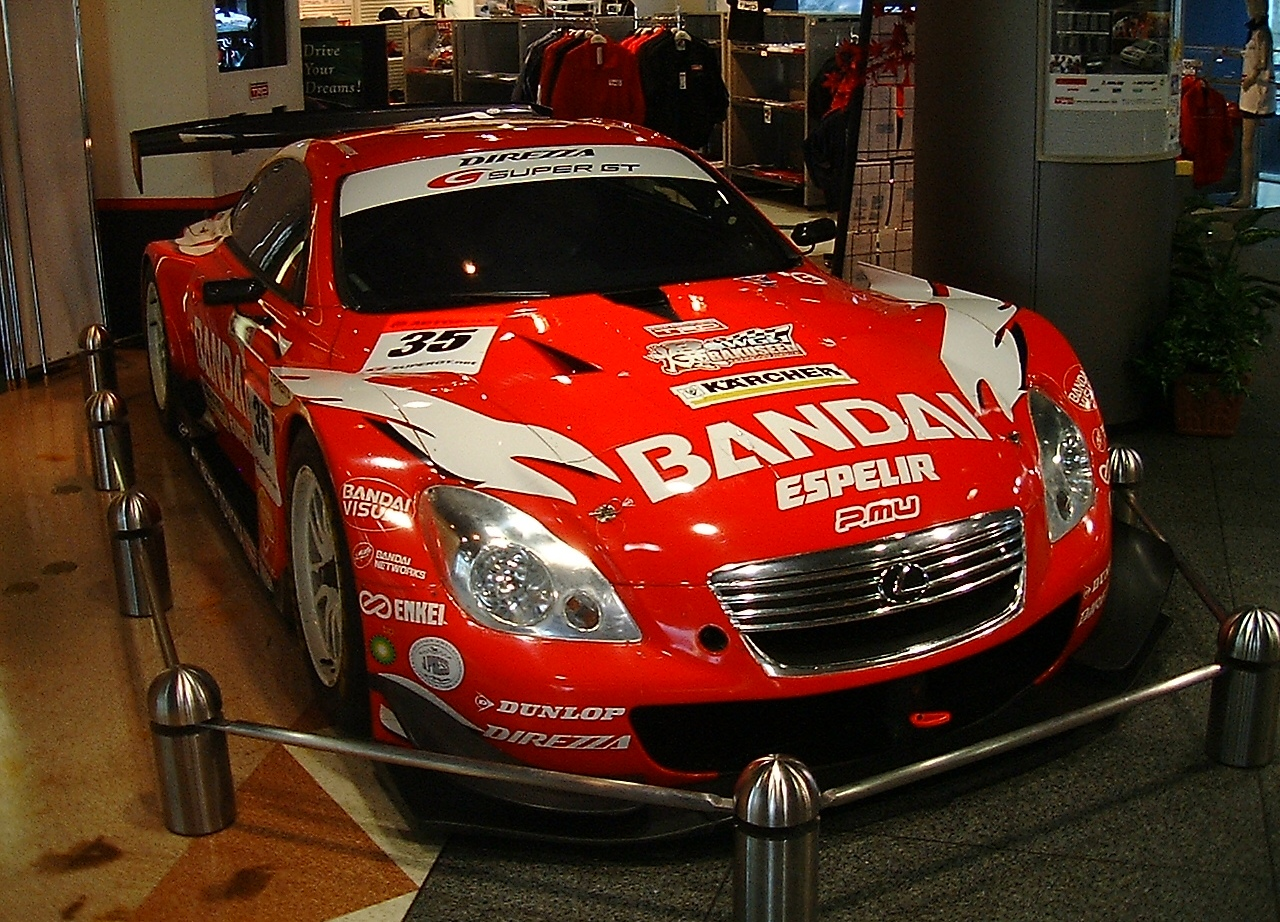
2006 Bandai Direzza SC430.

== Drivers and teams ==
=== GT500 ===
Team	Make	Car	Engine	No.	Drivers	Tyre	Rounds
Toyota Team Cerumo	Lexus	Lexus SC430 GT500	Lexus 3UZ-FE 4.5 L V8	1	(Japan) Toranosuke Takagi	B	All
Toyota Team Cerumo	Lexus	Lexus SC430 GT500	Lexus 3UZ-FE 4.5 L V8	1	(Japan) Yuji Tachikawa	B	All
Toyota Team Cerumo	Lexus	Lexus SC430 GT500	Lexus 3UZ-FE 4.5 L V8	1	(Italy) Ronnie Quintarelli	B	6
Hasemi Motorsport	Nissan	Nissan Fairlady Z GT500	Nissan VQ30DETT 3.0 L Twin Turbo V6	3	(Brazil) João Paulo de Oliveira	B	All
Hasemi Motorsport	Nissan	Nissan Fairlady Z GT500	Nissan VQ30DETT 3.0 L Twin Turbo V6	3	(Japan) Naoki Yokomizo	B	All
Hasemi Motorsport	Nissan	Nissan Fairlady Z GT500	Nissan VQ30DETT 3.0 L Twin Turbo V6	3	(United Kingdom) Darren Manning	B	6
Mobil 1 Toyota Team LeMans	Lexus	Lexus SC430 GT500	Lexus 3UZ-FE 4.5 L V8	6	(Japan) Akira Iida	B	All
Mobil 1 Toyota Team LeMans	Lexus	Lexus SC430 GT500	Lexus 3UZ-FE 4.5 L V8	6	(Japan) Tatsuya Kataoka	B	All
Mobil 1 Toyota Team LeMans	Lexus	Lexus SC430 GT500	Lexus 3UZ-FE 4.5 L V8	6	(Sweden) Björn Wirdheim	B	6
Team Honda Racing	Honda	Honda NSX GT500	Honda C32B 3.5 L V6	8	(Republic of Ireland) Ralph Firman	B	All
Team Honda Racing	Honda	Honda NSX GT500	Honda C32B 3.5 L V6	8	(Japan) Daisuke Ito	B	All
Team Honda Racing	Honda	Honda NSX GT500	Honda C32B 3.5 L V6	8	(Japan) Toshihiro Kaneishi	B	6
Team Honda Racing	Honda	Honda NSX GT500	Honda C32B 3.5 L V6	18	(Japan) Ryō Michigami	B	All
Team Honda Racing	Honda	Honda NSX GT500	Honda C32B 3.5 L V6	18	(Japan) Takashi Kogure	B	All
Team Honda Racing	Honda	Honda NSX GT500	Honda C32B 3.5 L V6	18	(Japan) Katsutomo Kaneishi	B	6
Team Impul	Nissan	Nissan Fairlady Z GT500	Nissan VQ30DETT 3.0 L Twin Turbo V6	12	(Japan) Kazuki Hoshino	B	All
Team Impul	Nissan	Nissan Fairlady Z GT500	Nissan VQ30DETT 3.0 L Twin Turbo V6	12	(France) Benoît Tréluyer	B	All
Team Impul	Nissan	Nissan Fairlady Z GT500	Nissan VQ30DETT 3.0 L Twin Turbo V6	12	(France) Jérémie Dufour	B	6
Nismo	Nissan	Nissan Fairlady Z GT500	Nissan VQ30DETT 3.0 L Twin Turbo V6	22	(Germany) Michael Krumm	B	All
Nismo	Nissan	Nissan Fairlady Z GT500	Nissan VQ30DETT 3.0 L Twin Turbo V6	22	(Japan) Sakon Yamamoto	B	1–3
Nismo	Nissan	Nissan Fairlady Z GT500	Nissan VQ30DETT 3.0 L Twin Turbo V6	22	(United Kingdom) Richard Lyons	B	4–9
Nismo	Nissan	Nissan Fairlady Z GT500	Nissan VQ30DETT 3.0 L Twin Turbo V6	22	(Brazil) Fabio Carbone	B	6
Nismo	Nissan	Nissan Fairlady Z GT500	Nissan VQ30DETT 3.0 L Twin Turbo V6	23	(Japan) Tsugio Matsuda	B	All
Nismo	Nissan	Nissan Fairlady Z GT500	Nissan VQ30DETT 3.0 L Twin Turbo V6	23	(Japan) Satoshi Motoyama	B	All
Nismo	Nissan	Nissan Fairlady Z GT500	Nissan VQ30DETT 3.0 L Twin Turbo V6	23	(Japan) Yuji Ide	B	6
Kondo Racing	Nissan	Nissan Fairlady Z GT500	Nissan VQ30DETT 3.0 L Twin Turbo V6	24	(Japan) Masataka Yanagida	Y	All
Kondo Racing	Nissan	Nissan Fairlady Z GT500	Nissan VQ30DETT 3.0 L Twin Turbo V6	24	(France) Érik Comas	Y	1–4, 6
Kondo Racing	Nissan	Nissan Fairlady Z GT500	Nissan VQ30DETT 3.0 L Twin Turbo V6	24	(Japan) Seiji Ara	Y	5–9
Toyota Team Tsuchiya	Toyota	Toyota Supra GT500	Toyota 3UZ-FE 4.5 L V8	25	(Japan) Takeshi Tsuchiya	Y	All
Toyota Team Tsuchiya	Toyota	Toyota Supra GT500	Toyota 3UZ-FE 4.5 L V8	25	(Japan) Manabu Orido	Y	All
Toyota Team Tsuchiya	Toyota	Toyota Supra GT500	Toyota 3UZ-FE 4.5 L V8	25	(Japan) Hideki Noda	Y	6
Nakajima Racing	Honda	Honda NSX GT500	Honda C32B 3.5 L V6	32	(France) Loïc Duval	D	All
Nakajima Racing	Honda	Honda NSX GT500	Honda C32B 3.5 L V6	32	(Japan) Hideki Mutoh	D	All
Toyota Team Kraft	Lexus	Lexus SC430 GT500	Lexus 3UZ-FE 4.5 L V8	35	(Japan) Naoki Hattori	D	All
Toyota Team Kraft	Lexus	Lexus SC430 GT500	Lexus 3UZ-FE 4.5 L V8	35	(United Kingdom) Peter Dumbreck	D	All
Toyota Team Kraft	Lexus	Lexus SC430 GT500	Lexus 3UZ-FE 4.5 L V8	35	(Japan) Eiichi Tajima	D	6
Toyota Team TOM'S	Lexus	Lexus SC430 GT500	Lexus 3UZ-FE 4.5 L V8	36	(Japan) Juichi Wakisaka	B	All
Toyota Team TOM'S	Lexus	Lexus SC430 GT500	Lexus 3UZ-FE 4.5 L V8	36	(Germany) André Lotterer	B	All
Toyota Team TOM'S	Lexus	Lexus SC430 GT500	Lexus 3UZ-FE 4.5 L V8	36	(Germany) Adrian Sutil	B	6
Stile Corse	Maserati	Maserati MC12 GT1	Maserati M144B/2 6.0 L V12	51	(Denmark) Jan Magnussen	B	None
Stile Corse	Maserati	Maserati MC12 GT1	Maserati M144B/2 6.0 L V12	51	(Japan) Seiji Ara	B	None
Toyota Team SARD	Toyota	Toyota Supra GT500	Toyota 3UZ-FE 4.5 L V8	66	(Portugal) André Couto	B	All
Toyota Team SARD	Toyota	Toyota Supra GT500	Toyota 3UZ-FE 4.5 L V8	66	(Japan) Katsuyuki Hiranaka	B	All
Toyota Team SARD	Toyota	Toyota Supra GT500	Toyota 3UZ-FE 4.5 L V8	66	(France) Soheil Ayari	B	6
Team Kunimitsu	Honda	Honda NSX GT500	Honda C32B 3.5 L V6	100	(Japan) Shinya Hosokawa	B	All
Team Kunimitsu	Honda	Honda NSX GT500	Honda C32B 3.5 L V6	100	(France) Sébastien Philippe	B	All

=== GT300 ===
Team	Make	Car	Engine	No.	Drivers	Tyre	Rounds
Cars Tokai Dream28	Mooncraft	Mooncraft Shiden	Toyota 1UZ-FE 4.2 L V8	2	(Japan) Kazuho Takahashi	Y	All
Cars Tokai Dream28	Mooncraft	Mooncraft Shiden	Toyota 1UZ-FE 4.2 L V8	2	(Japan) Hiroki Katoh	Y	All
Cars Tokai Dream28	Mooncraft	Mooncraft Shiden	Toyota 1UZ-FE 4.2 L V8	2	(Japan) Hiroki Yoshimoto	Y	6
Team Mach	Vemac	Vemac RD320R	Honda C32B 3.4 L V6	5	(Japan) Tetsuji Tamanaka	Y	All
Team Mach	Vemac	Vemac RD320R	Honda C32B 3.4 L V6	5	(Japan) Katsuhiko Tsutsui	Y	All
Team Mach	Vemac	Vemac RD320R	Honda C32B 3.4 L V6	5	(Japan) Akira Watanabe	Y	6
RE Amemiya Racing	Mazda	Mazda RX-7	Mazda RE20B 2.0 L 3-rotor	7	(Japan) Hiroyuki Iiri	Y	1, 3–9
RE Amemiya Racing	Mazda	Mazda RX-7	Mazda RE20B 2.0 L 3-rotor	7	(Japan) Tetsuya Yamano	Y	1, 3–9
RE Amemiya Racing	Mazda	Mazda RX-7	Mazda RE20B 2.0 L 3-rotor	7	(Japan) Shinichi Yamaji	Y	6
A&S Racing	Mosler	Mosler MT900R	Chevrolet LS1 6.0 L V8	9	(Japan) Osamu Nakajima	Y	1–3, 5–9
A&S Racing	Mosler	Mosler MT900R	Chevrolet LS1 6.0 L V8	9	(Japan) Takaya Tsubobayashi	Y	1
A&S Racing	Mosler	Mosler MT900R	Chevrolet LS1 6.0 L V8	9	(Japan) Masaki Tanaka	Y	2–3, 5–9
JIM Gainer	Ferrari	Ferrari 360	Ferrari F131B 3.6 L V8	10	(Japan) Hiromi Kozono	D	1–7, 9
JIM Gainer	Ferrari	Ferrari 360	Ferrari F131B 3.6 L V8	10	(Japan) Naofumi Omoto	D	1–7, 9
JIM Gainer	Ferrari	Ferrari 360	Ferrari F131B 3.6 L V8	10	(Japan) Eiji Yamada	D	6
JIM Gainer	Ferrari	Ferrari 360	Ferrari F131B 3.6 L V8	11	(Japan) Tetsuya Tanaka	D	All
JIM Gainer	Ferrari	Ferrari 360	Ferrari F131B 3.6 L V8	11	(Japan) Takayuki Aoki	D	All
Endless Sports	Nissan	Nissan Fairlady Z	Nissan VQ35DE 3.5 L V6	13	(Japan) Tomonobu Fujii	Y	All
Endless Sports	Nissan	Nissan Fairlady Z	Nissan VQ35DE 3.5 L V6	13	(Japan) Masami Kageyama	Y	All
Endless Sports	Porsche	Porsche 996 GT3-R	Porsche M96/73 3.6 L F6	14	(Japan) Mitsuhiro Kinoshita	H	All
Endless Sports	Porsche	Porsche 996 GT3-R	Porsche M96/73 3.6 L F6	14	(Japan) Kyosuke Mineo	H	All
Endless Sports	Porsche	Porsche 996 GT3-R	Porsche M96/73 3.6 L F6	14	(Japan) Jukuchou Sunako	H	6
Racing Project Bandoh	Toyota	Toyota Celica	Toyota 3S-GTE 2.0 L Turbo I4	19	(Japan) Koji Matsuda	Y	All
Racing Project Bandoh	Toyota	Toyota Celica	Toyota 3S-GTE 2.0 L Turbo I4	19	(Japan) Shigekazu Wakisaka	Y	All
Team Taisan with Nishizawa	Porsche	Porsche 996 GT3-RS	Porsche M96/77 3.6 L F6	26	(Japan) Kazuyuki Nishizawa	Y	2–3, 9
Team Taisan with Nishizawa	Porsche	Porsche 996 GT3-RS	Porsche M96/77 3.6 L F6	26	(Japan) Shinichi Yamaji	Y	2–3, 9
Direxiv Motorsport	Vemac	Vemac RD320R	Honda C32B 3.4 L V6	27	(Japan) Shogo Mitsuyama	Y	1–6
Direxiv Motorsport	Vemac	Vemac RD320R	Honda C32B 3.4 L V6	27	(Japan) Nobuteru Taniguchi	Y	1–6
MOLA	Nissan	Nissan Fairlady Z	Nissan VQ35DE 3.5 L V6	46	(Japan) Kota Sasaki	D	All
MOLA	Nissan	Nissan Fairlady Z	Nissan VQ35DE 3.5 L V6	46	(Japan) Taku Bamba	D	All
MOLA	Nissan	Nissan Fairlady Z	Nissan VQ35DE 3.5 L V6	47	(Japan) Hironobu Yasuda	D	All
MOLA	Nissan	Nissan Fairlady Z	Nissan VQ35DE 3.5 L V6	47	(Japan) Masaoki Nagashima	D	All
Toyota Team Cerumo	Toyota	Toyota Celica	Toyota 3S-GTE 2.0 L Turbo I4	52	(Japan) Hironori Takeuchi	K	1–3, 5–9
Toyota Team Cerumo	Toyota	Toyota Celica	Toyota 3S-GTE 2.0 L Turbo I4	52	(Japan) Koki Saga	K	1–3, 5–9
Toyota Team Cerumo	Toyota	Toyota Celica	Toyota 3S-GTE 2.0 L Turbo I4	52	(Japan) Keita Sawa	K	6
DHG Racing	Ford	Ford GT	DHG D35806V 3.5 L V8	55	(Japan) Daisuke Ikeda	Y	All
DHG Racing	Ford	Ford GT	DHG D35806V 3.5 L V8	55	(Japan) Hidetoshi Mitsusada	Y	All
DHG Racing	Ford	Ford GT	DHG D35806V 3.5 L V8	55	(Japan) Hiroaki Ishiura	Y	6
R&D Sport	Vemac	Vemac RD320R	Honda C32B 3.4 L V6	61	(Japan) Shogo Mitsuyama	Y	7–9
R&D Sport	Vemac	Vemac RD320R	Honda C32B 3.4 L V6	61	(Japan) Nobuteru Taniguchi	Y	7–9
R&D Sport	Vemac	Vemac RD408R	Mugen MF458S 4.5 L V8	62	(Japan) Shinsuke Shibahara	Y	All
R&D Sport	Vemac	Vemac RD408R	Mugen MF458S 4.5 L V8	62	(Japan) Hiroyuki Yagi	Y	1–4
R&D Sport	Vemac	Vemac RD408R	Mugen MF458S 4.5 L V8	62	(Japan) Haruki Kurosawa	Y	5–9
Team Gaikokuya	Porsche	Porsche 996 GT3-RS	Porsche M96/77 3.6 L F6	70	(Japan) Yoshimi Ishibashi	Y	1–4, 6
Team Gaikokuya	Porsche	Porsche 996 GT3-RS	Porsche M96/77 3.6 L F6	70	(Japan) Akira Hirakawa	Y	1–4
Team Gaikokuya	Porsche	Porsche 996 GT3-RS	Porsche M96/77 3.6 L F6	70	(Japan) Yutaka Yamagishi	Y	6–7
Team Gaikokuya	Porsche	Porsche 996 GT3-RS	Porsche M96/77 3.6 L F6	70	(Japan) Isao Ihashi	Y	6
Cusco Racing	Subaru	Subaru Impreza WRX STI	Subaru EJ20 2.0 L Turbo F4	77	(Japan) Katsuo Kobayashi	Y	5, 7–9
Cusco Racing	Subaru	Subaru Impreza WRX STI	Subaru EJ20 2.0 L Turbo F4	77	(Japan) Tatsuya Tanigawa	Y	5
Cusco Racing	Subaru	Subaru Impreza WRX STI	Subaru EJ20 2.0 L Turbo F4	77	(Japan) Yasushi Kikuchi	Y	7–9
JLOC	Lamborghini	Lamborghini Murciélago RG-1	Lamborghini L535 6.0 L V12	87	(Japan) Koji Yamanishi	Y	1–3, 5–9
JLOC	Lamborghini	Lamborghini Murciélago RG-1	Lamborghini L535 6.0 L V12	87	(Japan) Hisashi Wada	Y	1–3, 5–9
JLOC	Lamborghini	Lamborghini Murciélago RG-1	Lamborghini L535 6.0 L V12	87	(Japan) Atsushi Yogo	Y	6
JLOC	Lamborghini	Lamborghini Murciélago RG-1	Lamborghini L535 6.0 L V12	88	(Italy) Marco Apicella	Y	1–3, 5–9
JLOC	Lamborghini	Lamborghini Murciélago RG-1	Lamborghini L535 6.0 L V12	88	(Japan) Yasutaka Hinoi	Y	1–3, 5–9
JLOC	Lamborghini	Lamborghini Murciélago RG-1	Lamborghini L535 6.0 L V12	88	(Japan) Naohiro Furuya	Y	6
Ebbro Team Nova	Vemac	Vemac RD350R	Zytek ZV348 4.0 L V8	96	(Japan) Takuya Kurosawa	D	All
Ebbro Team Nova	Vemac	Vemac RD350R	Zytek ZV348 4.0 L V8	96	(Japan) Tsubasa Kurosawa	D	All
apr	Toyota	Toyota MR-S	Toyota 2GR-FE 3.5 L V6	101	(Japan) Morio Nitta	M	All
apr	Toyota	Toyota MR-S	Toyota 2GR-FE 3.5 L V6	101	(Japan) Shinichi Takagi	M	All
apr	Toyota	Toyota MR-S	Toyota 2GR-FE 3.5 L V6	777	(Japan) Minoru Tanaka	M	All
apr	Toyota	Toyota MR-S	Toyota 2GR-FE 3.5 L V6	777	(Japan) Kazuya Oshima	M	All
apr	Toyota	Toyota MR-S	Toyota 2GR-FE 3.5 L V6	777	(Japan) Keiichi Kobayashi	M	6
Arktech Motorsports	Porsche	Porsche 986 Boxster	Porsche M96/77 3.6 L F6	110	(Japan) Hideshi Matsuda	Y	All
Arktech Motorsports	Porsche	Porsche 986 Boxster	Porsche M96/77 3.6 L F6	110	(Japan) Ichijo Suga	Y	All
Arktech Motorsports	Porsche	Porsche 986 Boxster	Porsche M96/77 3.6 L F6	110	(Japan) Takaya Tsubobayashi	Y	6
Team LeyJun	Porsche	Porsche 996 GT3 Cup	Porsche M96/77 3.6 L F6	111	(Japan) Hiroya Iijima	Y	1, 3, 6–7
Team LeyJun	Porsche	Porsche 996 GT3 Cup	Porsche M96/77 3.6 L F6	111	(Japan) Masaki Jyonai	Y	1, 3, 6–7
Team LeyJun	Porsche	Porsche 996 GT3 Cup	Porsche M96/77 3.6 L F6	111	(Japan) Takeshi Namekawa	Y	6
Team Bomex Dream28	Honda	Honda NSX	Honda C32B 3.4 L V6	666	(Japan) Shogo Suho	Y	1–7, 9
Team Bomex Dream28	Honda	Honda NSX	Honda C32B 3.4 L V6	666	(Japan) Junichiro Yamashita	Y	1, 3–7, 9
Team Bomex Dream28	Honda	Honda NSX	Honda C32B 3.4 L V6	666	(Japan) Yasuhiro Takasaki	Y	2
910 Racing With Team Ishimatsu	Porsche	Porsche 996 GT3 RSR	Porsche M96/73 3.6 L F6	910	(Japan) Tadao Uematsu	Y	1–4, 6–7, 9
910 Racing With Team Ishimatsu	Porsche	Porsche 996 GT3 RSR	Porsche M96/73 3.6 L F6	910	(Japan) Yasushi Kikuchi	Y	1–4, 6
910 Racing With Team Ishimatsu	Porsche	Porsche 996 GT3 RSR	Porsche M96/73 3.6 L F6	910	(Japan) Ryohei Sakaguchi	Y	6, 9
910 Racing With Team Ishimatsu	Porsche	Porsche 996 GT3 RSR	Porsche M96/73 3.6 L F6	910	(Japan) Shinichi Yamaji	Y	7

=== Vehicle changes ===
==== GT500 ====
- Toyota introduced the Lexus SC 430 as their new GT500 vehicle, replacing the fourth-generation Toyota Supra. This coincided with the introduction of the Lexus nameplate for the Japanese market in July 2005. Four teams (TOM'S, Cerumo, LeMans, and Kraft) would run the new SC430, while SARD and Tsuchiya Engineering continued to use the Supra.
- Team Goh planned to enter the series with a Maserati MC12 GT1 driven by Seiji Ara and Jan Magnussen. Competing as Stile Corse, they participated in the pre-season test at Suzuka on 3–4 March, but after lacklustre results, the team scrapped their plans to race in GT500.

==== GT300 ====
- Mooncraft Engineering and Cars Tokai Dream28 introduced the Shiden MC/RT-16, a prototype racing car based upon the Riley Mk.XI Daytona Prototype powered by a Toyota 1UZ-FE V8 engine.
- DHG Racing debuted in the series with a new racing version of the Ford GT supercar. The car was powered by the 3.5 litre DHG D35806V V8 engine, which was derived from the Mugen MF308 engine previously used in the Formula Nippon championship.

=== Team changes ===
==== GT500 ====
- Kondo Racing, owned by Japanese musician and former racing driver Masahiko Kondo, entered Super GT for the first time as a Nissan factory team.
- Toyota teams TOM'S and Kraft scaled back to single-car teams after running two cars each in 2005.
- Hitotsuyama Racing and their privately entered Ferrari 550 GTS and McLaren F1 GTR withdrew from the series.

==== GT300 ====
- M-TEC (Mugen) closed their GT300 team to focus on their ongoing technical alliance with Team Kunimitsu in GT500.
- Autobacs Racing Team Aguri (ARTA) closed their GT300 team. apr, who operated ARTA's GT300 programme, signed ARTA drivers Morio Nitta and Shinichi Takagi to drive their number 101 Toyota MR-S sponsored by Toy Story Racing (through Run'A Entertainment).

=== Driver changes ===
==== GT500 ====
- Tsugio Matsuda transferred from Honda to Nissan, where he joined two-time GT500 champion Satoshi Motoyama in the number 23 NISMO entry. Likewise, Sakon Yamamoto transferred from Toyota to Nissan to partner another two-time GT500 champion, Michael Krumm, in the NISMO number 22 car.
- Masataka Yanagida and two-time GT500 champion Érik Comas joined the new Kondo Racing team. Yanagida transferred from NISMO, and Comas transferred from Hasemi Motorsport.
- Naoki Yokomizo transferred from Toyota to Nissan and joined Hasemi Motorsport, who also signed reigning All-Japan Formula 3 champion João Paulo de Oliveira for his Super GT series debut.
- Kazuki Hoshino, son of Impul co-founder Kazuyoshi Hoshino, stepped up to GT500 to join Team Impul. Hoshino replaced Yuji Ide, who signed with Super Aguri F1 Team.
- Nakajima Racing and Honda signed two recent Formula 3 graduates to drive for them in 2006: Formula 3 Euroseries graduate Loïc Duval, and All-Japan F3 race winner Hideki Mutoh.
- 2005 GT300 championship runner-up Shinya Hosokawa was promoted to GT500 with Team Kunimitsu, partnering Sébastien Philippe.
- André Lotterer transferred from Honda to Toyota, and joined Toyota Team TOM'S in the number 36 car. His new teammate was 2002 champion Juichi Wakisaka, who transferred from Toyota Team LeMans.
- In exchange for Wakisaka, Tatsuya Kataoka transferred from the defunct number 37 TOM'S team to join Toyota Team LeMans, alongside 2002 co-champion Akira Iida.
- Takeshi Tsuchiya joined his father's team, Toyota Team Tsuchiya, after transferring from TOM'S.
- Katsuyuki Hiranaka was promoted to GT500 with Toyota Team SARD, joining André Couto.

== Schedule ==
Round	Race	Circuit	Date
1	(Japan) Suzuka GT 300 km	Suzuka Circuit	March 19
2	(Japan) Okayama GT 300 km Race	Okayama International Circuit	April 9
3	(Japan) Fuji GT 500 km Race	Fuji International Speedway	May 4
4	Japan GT Championship Malaysia	Sepang International Circuit	June 25
5	(Japan) SUGO GT 300 km Race	Sportsland Sugo	July 23
6	(Japan) International POKKA 1000km	Suzuka Circuit	August 20
7	(Japan) Motegi GT 300 km Race	Twin Ring Motegi	September 10
8	(Japan) Super GT in Kyushu GT 300 km	Autopolis International Race Course	October 15
9	(Japan) Fuji GT 300 km Race	Fuji International Speedway	November 5

== Results ==
Round	Circuit	Date	Class	Pole position	Fastest lap	Race winner
1	Suzuka Circuit	19 March	GT500	No. 8 Team Honda Racing	No. 12 Team Impul	No. 36 Toyota Team TOM'S
1	Suzuka Circuit	19 March	GT500	(Japan) Daisuke Ito (Republic of Ireland) Ralph Firman	(France) Benoît Tréluyer (Japan) Kazuki Hoshino	(Japan) Juichi Wakisaka (Germany) André Lotterer
1	Suzuka Circuit	19 March	GT300	No. 46 MOLA	No. 87 JLOC	No. 88 JLOC
1	Suzuka Circuit	19 March	GT300	(Japan) Kota Sasaki (Japan) Taku Bamba	(Japan) Koji Yamanishi (Japan) Hisashi Wada	(Italy) Marco Apicella (Japan) Yasutaka Hinoi
2	Okayama International Circuit	9 April	GT500	No. 18 Team Honda Racing	No. 18 Team Honda Racing	No. 18 Team Honda Racing
2	Okayama International Circuit	9 April	GT500	(Japan) Ryō Michigami (Japan) Takashi Kogure	(Japan) Ryō Michigami (Japan) Takashi Kogure	(Japan) Ryō Michigami (Japan) Takashi Kogure
2	Okayama International Circuit	9 April	GT300	No. 46 MOLA	No. 27 direxiv motorsport	No. 27 direxiv motorsport
2	Okayama International Circuit	9 April	GT300	(Japan) Kota Sasaki (Japan) Taku Bamba	(Japan) Shogo Mitsuyama (Japan) Nobuteru Taniguchi	(Japan) Shogo Mitsuyama (Japan) Nobuteru Taniguchi
3	Fuji Speedway	4 May	GT500	No. 1 Toyota Team Cerumo	No. 1 Toyota Team Cerumo	No. 35 Toyota Team Kraft
3	Fuji Speedway	4 May	GT500	(Japan) Yuji Tachikawa (Japan) Toranosuke Takagi	(Japan) Yuji Tachikawa (Japan) Toranosuke Takagi	(Japan) Naoki Hattori (United Kingdom) Peter Dumbreck
3	Fuji Speedway	4 May	GT300	No. 2 Cars Tokai Dream28	No. 13 Endless Sports	No. 62 Willcom R & D Sport
3	Fuji Speedway	4 May	GT300	(Japan) Kazuho Takahashi (Japan) Hiroki Katoh	(Japan) Masami Kageyama (Japan) Tomonobu Fujii	(Japan) Shinsuke Shibahara (Japan) Hiroyuki Yagi
4	Sepang Circuit	25 June	GT500	No. 8 Team Honda Racing	No. 8 Team Honda Racing	No. 8 Team Honda Racing
4	Sepang Circuit	25 June	GT500	(Japan) Daisuke Ito (Republic of Ireland) Ralph Firman	(Japan) Daisuke Ito (Republic of Ireland) Ralph Firman	(Japan) Daisuke Ito (Republic of Ireland) Ralph Firman
4	Sepang Circuit	25 June	GT300	No. 2 Cars Tokai Dream28	No. 7 RE Amemiya Racing	No. 7 RE Amemiya Racing
4	Sepang Circuit	25 June	GT300	(Japan) Kazuho Takahashi (Japan) Hiroki Katoh	(Japan) Tetsuya Yamano (Japan) Hiroyuki Iiri	(Japan) Tetsuya Yamano (Japan) Hiroyuki Iiri
5	Sportsland SUGO	23 July	GT500	No. 1 Toyota Team Cerumo	No. 18 Team Honda Racing	No. 1 Toyota Team Cerumo
5	Sportsland SUGO	23 July	GT500	(Japan) Yuji Tachikawa (Japan) Toranosuke Takagi	(Japan) Ryō Michigami (Japan) Takashi Kogure	(Japan) Yuji Tachikawa (Japan) Toranosuke Takagi
5	Sportsland SUGO	23 July	GT300	No. 88 JLOC	No. 11 JIM GAINER	No. 46 MOLA
5	Sportsland SUGO	23 July	GT300	(Italy) Marco Apicella (Japan) Yasutaka Hinoi	(Japan) Tetsuya Tanaka (Japan) Takayuki Aoki	(Japan) Kota Sasaki (Japan) Taku Bamba
6	Suzuka Circuit; Report	20 August	GT500	No. 12 Team Impul	No. 12 Team Impul	No. 12 Team Impul
6	Suzuka Circuit; Report	20 August	GT500	(France) Benoît Tréluyer (Japan) Kazuki Hoshino (France) Jérémie Dufour	(France) Benoît Tréluyer (Japan) Kazuki Hoshino (France) Jérémie Dufour	(France) Benoît Tréluyer (Japan) Kazuki Hoshino (France) Jérémie Dufour
6	Suzuka Circuit; Report	20 August	GT300	No. 52 Toyota Team Cerumo	No. 19 Racing Project Bandoh	No. 52 Toyota Team Cerumo
6	Suzuka Circuit; Report	20 August	GT300	(Japan) Hironori Takeuchi (Japan) Koki Saga (Japan) Keita Sawa	(Japan) Koji Matsuda (Japan) Shigekazu Wakisaka	(Japan) Hironori Takeuchi (Japan) Koki Saga (Japan) Keita Sawa
7	Twin Ring Motegi	10 September	GT500	No. 100 Team Kunimitsu	No. 100 Team Kunimitsu	No. 100 Team Kunimitsu
7	Twin Ring Motegi	10 September	GT500	(France) Sébastien Philippe (Japan) Shinya Hosokawa	(France) Sébastien Philippe (Japan) Shinya Hosokawa	(France) Sébastien Philippe (Japan) Shinya Hosokawa
7	Twin Ring Motegi	10 September	GT300	No. 62 Willcom R & D Sport	No. 62 Willcom R & D Sport	No. 11 JIM GAINER
7	Twin Ring Motegi	10 September	GT300	(Japan) Shinsuke Shibahara (Japan) Haruki Kurosawa	(Japan) Shinsuke Shibahara (Japan) Haruki Kurosawa	(Japan) Tetsuya Tanaka (Japan) Takayuki Aoki
8	Autopolis	15 October	GT500	No. 18 Team Honda Racing	No. 23 NISMO	No. 23 NISMO
8	Autopolis	15 October	GT500	(Japan) Ryō Michigami (Japan) Takashi Kogure	(Japan) Satoshi Motoyama (Japan) Tsugio Matsuda	(Japan) Satoshi Motoyama (Japan) Tsugio Matsuda
8	Autopolis	15 October	GT300	No. 2 Cars Tokai Dream28	No. 2 Cars Tokai Dream28	No. 2 Cars Tokai Dream28
8	Autopolis	15 October	GT300	(Japan) Kazuho Takahashi (Japan) Hiroki Katoh	(Japan) Kazuho Takahashi (Japan) Hiroki Katoh	(Japan) Kazuho Takahashi (Japan) Hiroki Katoh
9	Fuji Speedway	5 November	GT500	No. 32 Nakajima Racing	No. 32 Nakajima Racing	No. 32 Nakajima Racing
9	Fuji Speedway	5 November	GT500	(France) Loïc Duval (Japan) Hideki Mutoh	(France) Loïc Duval (Japan) Hideki Mutoh	(France) Loïc Duval (Japan) Hideki Mutoh
9	Fuji Speedway	5 November	GT300	No. 777 Ryozanpaku with apr	No. 777 Ryozanpaku with apr	No. 101 apr
9	Fuji Speedway	5 November	GT300	(Japan) Minoru Tanaka (Japan) Kazuya Oshima	(Japan) Minoru Tanaka (Japan) Kazuya Oshima	(Japan) Morio Nitta (Japan) Shinichi Takagi

== Standings ==
=== GT500 Drivers ===
Scoring system

Position	1st	2nd	3rd	4th	5th	6th	7th	8th	9th	10th	11th	12th	13th	14th	15th
Points	20	15	11	8	6	5	4	3	2	1					
Suzuka 1000	25	20	16	13	11	10	9	8	7	6	5	4	3	2	1
Qualifying	4	3	2												
Fastest lap	3	2	1												

- Only the best five results in the first six races would be counted for the championship.
- There were no points awarded for pole position and fastest lap in the final race.

Rank	Driver	No.	SUZ (Japan)	OKA (Japan)	FUJ (Japan)	SEP (Malaysia)	SUG (Japan)	SUZ (Japan)	MOT (Japan)	AUT (Japan)	FUJ (Japan)	Pts.
1	(Germany) André Lotterer (Japan) Juichi Wakisaka	36	1	8	3	15	4	10	2	7	4	80
2	(Japan) Shinya Hosokawa (France) Sébastien Philippe	100	7	2	Ret	4	11	9	1	3	13	79
3	(Japan) Takashi Kogure (Japan) Ryō Michigami	18	4	1	Ret	6	Ret	Ret	5	2	7	76
4	(Germany) Michael Krumm	22	12	3	9	2	3	2	10	6	6	75
5	(Japan) Yuji Tachikawa (Japan) Toranosuke Takagi	1	5	5	Ret	12	1	7	3	5	Ret	71
6	(Japan) Tsugio Matsuda (Japan) Satoshi Motoyama	23	2	Ret	4	5	2	DSQ	14	1	11	69
7	(Republic of Ireland) Ralph Firman (Japan) Daisuke Ito	8	3	7	8	1	8	6	15	11	14	68
8	(Japan) Kazuki Hoshino (France) Benoît Tréluyer	12	13	6	5	3	6	1	13	4	12	67
9	(Japan) Naoki Hattori (United Kingdom) Peter Dumbreck	35	14	12	1	11	7	3	7	9	2	64
10	(United Kingdom) Richard Lyons	22				2	3	2	10	6	6	62
11	(France) Loïc Duval (Japan) Hideki Mutoh	32	15	Ret	7	9	5	4	8	12	1	51
12	(Japan) Akira Iida (Japan) Tatsuya Kataoka	6	6	11	2	14	9	Ret	4	13	5	41
13	(Japan) Masataka Yanagida	24	10	10	10	8	10	5	6	14	3	34
14	(France) Jérémie Dufour	12						1				32
15	(Brazil) João Paulo de Oliveira (Japan) Naoki Yokomizo	3	9	4	12	7	13	8	11	8	8	32
16	(Japan) Seiji Ara	24					10	5	6	14	3	28
17	(Brazil) Fabio Carbone	22						2				20
18	(France) Érik Comas	24	10	10	10	8		5				18
19	(Japan) Manabu Orido (Japan) Takeshi Tsuchiya	25	8	9	6	10	12	Ret	12	15	9	18
20	(Japan) Eiichi Tajima	35						3				16
21	(Japan) Sakon Yamamoto	22	12	3	9							15
22	(Japan) Toshihiro Kaneishi	8						6				13
23	(Portugal) André Couto (Japan) Katsuyuki Hiranaka	66	11	13	11	13	Ret	11	9	10	10	13
24	(Italy) Ronnie Quintarelli	1						7				9
25	(United Kingdom) Darren Manning	3						8				8
26	(Germany) Adrian Sutil	36						10				6
27	(France) Soheil Ayari	66						11				5
28	(Japan) Hideki Noda	25						Ret				5
-	(Sweden) Björn Wirdheim	6						Ret				0
-	(Japan) Yuji Ide	23						DSQ				0
Rank	Driver	No.	SUZ (Japan)	OKA (Japan)	FUJ (Japan)	SEP (Malaysia)	SUG (Japan)	SUZ (Japan)	MOT (Japan)	AUT (Japan)	FUJ (Japan)	Pts.

Colour	Result
Gold	Winner
Silver	Second place
Bronze	Third place
Green	Points classification
Blue	Non-points classification
Blue	Non-classified finish (NC)
Purple	Retired, not classified (Ret)
Red	Did not qualify (DNQ)
Red	Did not pre-qualify (DNPQ)
Black	Disqualified (DSQ)
White	Did not start (DNS)
White	Withdrew (WD)
White	Race cancelled (C)
Blank	Did not practice (DNP)
Blank	Did not arrive (DNA)
Blank	Excluded (EX)

==== Teams' standings ====
Rank	Team	No.	SUZ (Japan)	OKA (Japan)	FUJ (Japan)	SEP (Malaysia)	SUG (Japan)	SUZ (Japan)	MOT (Japan)	AUT (Japan)	FUJ (Japan)	Pts.
1	Toyota Team TOM'S	36	1	8	3	15	4	10	2	7	4	75
2	Nismo	22	12	3	9	2	3	2	10	6	6	70
3	Team Kunimitsu	100	7	2	Ret	4	11	9	1	3	13	65
4	Nismo	23	2	Ret	4	5	2	DSQ	14	1	11	64
5	Toyota Team Kraft	35	14	12	1	11	7	3	7	9	2	61
6	Team Impul	12	13	6	5	3	6	1	13	4	12	60
7	Toyota Team Cerumo	1	5	5	Ret	12	1	7	3	5	Ret	58
8	Team Honda Racing	18	4	1	Ret	6	Ret	Ret	5	2	7	58
9	Team Honda Racing	8	3	7	8	1	8	6	15	11	14	48
10	Nakajima Racing	32	15	Ret	7	9	5	4	8	12	1	48
11	Mobil 1 Toyota Team LeMans	6	6	11	2	14	9	Ret	4	13	5	36
12	Kondo Racing	24	10	10	10	8	10	5	6	14	3	33
13	Hasemi Motorsport	3	9	4	12	7	13	8	11	8	8	28
14	Toyota Team Tsuchiya	25	8	9	6	10	12	Ret	12	15	9	13
15	Toyota Team SARD	66	11	13	11	13	Ret	11	9	10	10	9
Rank	Team	No.	SUZ (Japan)	OKA (Japan)	FUJ (Japan)	SEP (Malaysia)	SUG (Japan)	SUZ (Japan)	MOT (Japan)	AUT (Japan)	FUJ (Japan)	Pts.

=== GT300 Drivers' championship ===
Rank	Driver	No.	SUZ (Japan)	OKA (Japan)	FUJ (Japan)	SEP (Malaysia)	SUG (Japan)	SUZ (Japan)	MOT (Japan)	AUT (Japan)	FUJ (Japan)	Pts.
1	(Japan) Hiroyuki Iiri (Japan) Tetsuya Yamano	7	2		11	1	9	4	4	2	6	86
2	(Japan) Kazuho Takahashi (Japan) Hiroki Katoh	2	6	11	4	4	3	5	21	1	12	86
3	(Japan) Shogo Mitsuyama (Japan) Nobuteru Taniguchi	27/61	7	1	18	2	4	2	6	20	13	75
4	(Japan) Masami Kageyama (Japan) Tomonobu Fujii	13	16	4	13	18	2	16	2	11	3	62
5	(Japan) Morio Nitta (Japan) Shinichi Takagi	101	Ret	9	2	Ret	5	3	10	Ret	1	60
6	(Japan) Shinsuke Shibahara	62	18	7	1	13	Ret	7	3	6	14	57
7	(Japan) Kota Sasaki (Japan) Taku Bamba	46	12	5	6	12	1	8	24	16	7	56
8	(Japan) Takayuki Aoki (Japan) Tetsuya Tanaka	11	Ret	2	19	17	16	9	1	19	16	51
9	(Japan) Hideshi Matsuda (Japan) Ichijo Suga	110	3	3	8	9	6	10	17	4	Ret	49
10	(Japan) Koji Matsuda (Japan) Shigekazu Wakisaka	19	4	10	17	3	18	19	16	12	2	44
11	(Italy) Marco Apicella (Japan) Yasutaka Hinoi	88	1	6	Ret		15	Ret	Ret	8	5	40
12	(Japan) Haruki Kurosawa	62					Ret	7	3	6	14	33
13	(Japan) Koki Saga (Japan) Hironori Takeuchi	52	11	12	12		11	1	Ret	13	21	31
14	(Japan) Keita Sawa	52						1				31
15	(Japan) Minoru Tanaka (Japan) Kazuya Oshima	777	Ret	15	9	7	7	14	9	5	4	28
16	(Japan) Daisuke Ikeda (Japan) Hidetoshi Mitsusada	55		DNQ	10	5	Ret	Ret	5	3	15	25
17	(Japan) Hiroyuki Yagi	62	18	7	1	13						24
18	(Japan) Shinichi Yamaji	26/7/910		8	7			4	14		8	23
19	(Japan) Koji Yamanishi (Japan) Hisashi Wada	87	5	Ret	5		12	17	13	18	9	20
20	(Japan) Hironobu Yasuda (Japan) Masaoki Nagashima	47	10	18	14	10	8	6	8	10	19	20
21	(Japan) Mitsuhiro Kinoshita (Japan) Kyosuke Mineo	14	9	22	3	6	Ret	Ret	11	14	20	18
22	(Japan) Takuya Kurosawa (Japan) Tsubasa Kurosawa	96	8	21	15	DNS	10	Ret	12	15	10	12
23	(Japan) Hiroki Yoshimoto	2						5				11
24	(Japan) Kazuyuki Nishizawa	26		8	7						8	10
25	(Japan) Yasushi Kikuchi	910/77	15	19	Ret	11		12	7	9	11	10
26	(Japan) Tetsuji Tamanaka (Japan) Katsuhiko Tsutsui	5	14	13	Ret	8	17	18	18	7	17	7
27	(Japan) Katsuo Kobayashi	77					Ret		7	9	11	6
28	(Japan) Takaya Tsubobayashi	9/110	13					10			Ret	6
29	(Japan) Yoshimi Ishibashi	70	17	17	20	16		11	20		24	5
30	(Japan) Yutaka Yamagishi	70						11	20			5
31	(Japan) Isao Ihashi	70						11				5
32	(Japan) Tadao Uematsu	910	15	19	Ret	11		12	14		18	4
33	(Japan) Ryohei Sakaguchi	910						12				4
34	(Japan) Osamu Nakajima	9	13	20	Ret		13	13	22	17	Ret	3
35	(Japan) Masaki Tanaka	9		20	Ret		13	13	22	17		3
36	(Japan) Keiichi Kobayashi	777						14				2
37	(Japan) Hiroya Iijima (Japan) Masaki Jyonai	111	Ret		16			15	23		25	1
38	(Japan) Takeshi Namekawa	111						15				1
-	(Japan) Shogo Suho	666	Ret	14	21	15	14		15		23	0
-	(Japan) Junichiro Yamashita	666	Ret		21	15	14		15		23	0
-	(Japan) Hiromi Kozono (Japan) Naofumi Omoto	10	19	16	Ret	14	Ret	Ret	19		22	0
-	(Japan) Yasuhiro Takasaki	666		14								0
-	(Japan) Akira Hirakawa	70	17	17	20	16						0
-	(Japan) Atsushi Yogo	87						17				0
-	(Japan) Akira Watanabe	5						18				0
-	(Japan) Kazuyoshi Takamizawa	70									24	0
-	(Japan) Tatsuya Tanigawa	77					Ret					0
-	(Japan) Jukuchou Sunako	14						Ret				0
-	(Japan) Naohiro Furuya	88						Ret				0
-	(Japan) Hiroaki Ishiura	55						Ret				0
-	(Japan) Eiji Yamada	10						Ret				0
Rank	Driver	No.	SUZ (Japan)	OKA (Japan)	FUJ (Japan)	SEP (Malaysia)	SUG (Japan)	SUZ (Japan)	MOT (Japan)	AUT (Japan)	FUJ (Japan)	Pts.

==== GT300 Teams' standings ====
Rank	Team	No.	SUZ (Japan)	OKA (Japan)	FUJ (Japan)	SEP (Malaysia)	SUG (Japan)	SUZ (Japan)	MOT (Japan)	AUT (Japan)	FUJ (Japan)	Pts.
1	RE Amemiya Racing	7	2		11	1	9	4	4	2	6	78
2	Direxiv Motorsport	27	7	1	18	2	4	2				67
3	Cars Tokai Dream28	2	6	11	4	4	3	5	21	1	12	63
4	apr	101	Ret	9	2	Ret	5	3	10	Ret	1	60
5	WILLCOM R&D Sport	62	18	7	1	13	Ret	7	3	6	14	49
6	Endless Sports	13	16	4	13	18	2	16	2	11	3	49
7	Arktech Motorsports	110	3	3	8	9	6	10	17	4	Ret	44
8	MOLA	46	12	5	6	12	1	8	24	16	7	43
9	JIM Gainer Racing	11	Ret	2	19	17	16	9	1	19	16	42
10	Racing Project Bandoh	19	4	10	17	3	18	19	16	12	2	35
11	JLOC	88	1	6	Ret		15	Ret	Ret	8	5	34
12	Liangshan Po with apr	777	Ret	15	9	7	7	14	9	5	4	28
13	Toyota Team Cerumo	52	11	12	12		11	1	Ret	13	21	25
14	DHG Racing	55		DNQ	10	5	Ret	Ret	5	3	15	24
15	MOLA	47	10	18	14	10	8	6	8	10	19	19
16	Endless Sports	14	9	22	3	6	Ret	Ret	11	14	20	18
17	JLOC	87	5	Ret	5		12	17	13	18	9	14
18	Team Taisan with Nishizawa	26		8	7						8	10
19	Team Mach	5	14	13	Ret	8	17	18	18	7	17	7
20	Cusco Racing	77					Ret		7	9	11	6
21	Team Gaikokuya	70	17	17	20	16		11	20		24	5
22	R&D Sport	62							6	20	13	5
23	Ebbro Team Nova	96	8	21	15	DNS	10	Ret	12	15	10	5
24	910 Racing	910	15	19	Ret	11		12	14		18	4
25	A&S Racing	9	13	20	Ret		13	13	22	17	Ret	3
26	Team LeyJun	111	Ret		16			15	23		25	1
-	Team Bomex Dream28	666	Ret	14	21	15	14		15		23	0
-	JIM Gainer Racing	10	19	16	Ret	14	Ret	Ret	19		22	0
Rank	Team	No.	SUZ (Japan)	OKA (Japan)	FUJ (Japan)	SEP (Malaysia)	SUG (Japan)	SUZ (Japan)	MOT (Japan)	AUT (Japan)	FUJ (Japan)	Pts.
