= Mooncraft Shiden =

Japanese prototype race car

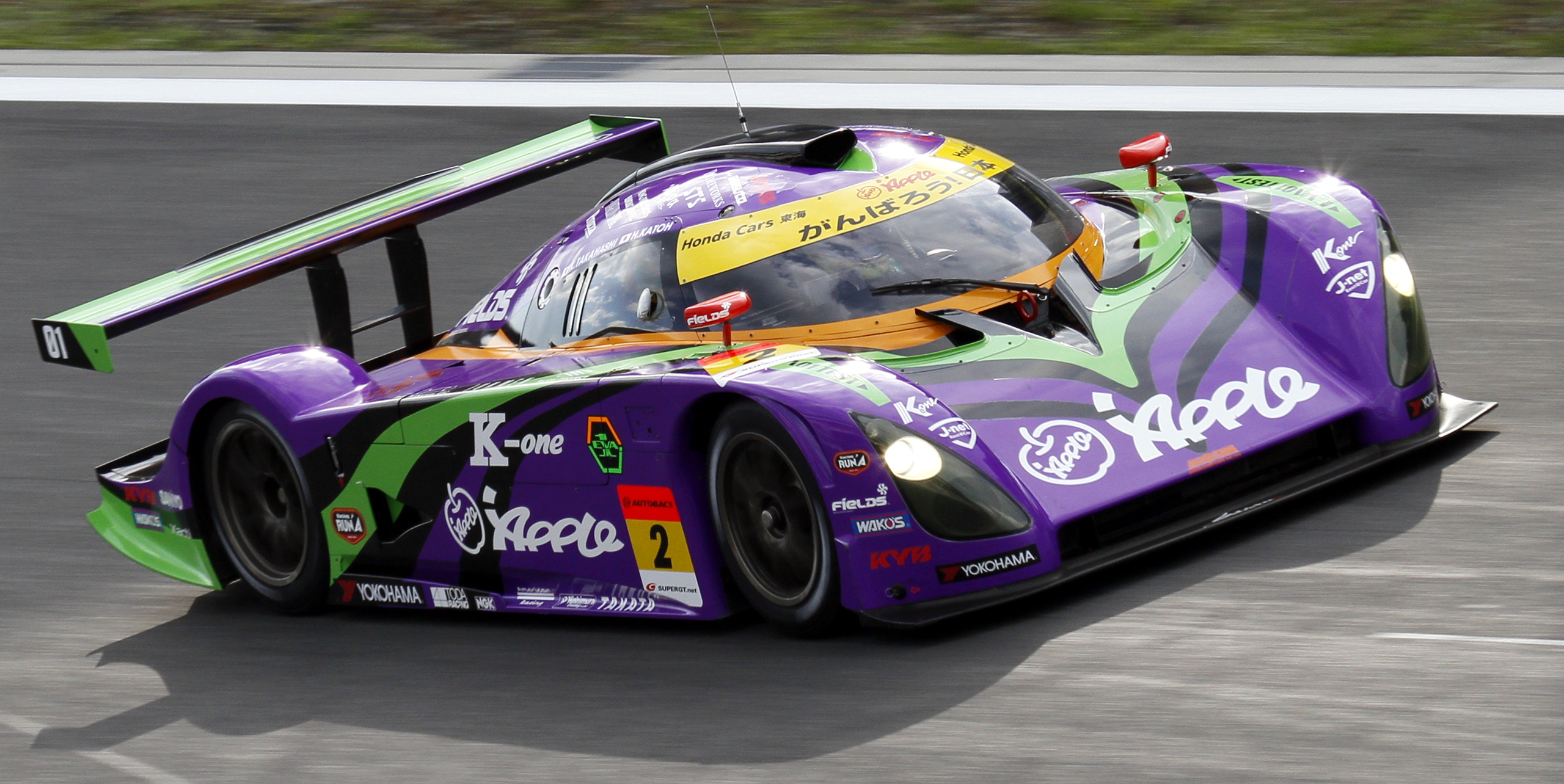
- Category: Super GT GT300
- Constructor: Mooncraft
- Designer: Takuya Yura

Technical specifications
- Chassis: Steel-aluminum hybrid
- Suspension (front): Double wishbone pushrod with 3-way adjustable dampers
- Suspension (rear): Same as front
- Length: 4,640 mm (182.7 in)
- Width: 1,985 mm (78.1 in)
- Height: 1,210 mm (47.6 in)
- Axle track: 1,625–1,630 mm (64.0–64.2 in)
- Wheelbase: 2,788 mm (109.8 in)
- Engine: Toyota 1UZ-FE 4,200–4,400 cc V8 naturally aspirated Mid-engined, longitudinally mounted
- Transmission: Xtrac 6-speed sequential manual
- Power: 460 ps @ 7800 rpm
- Weight: 1,150 kg (2,535 lb)
- Tyres: Advan 300-640x18/355-710x18 (275-620x17/330-700x17)

Competition history
- Notable entrants: Cars Tokai Dream28
- Notable drivers: (Japan) Hiroki Katoh; (Japan) Kazuho Takahashi; (Japan) Hiroki Yoshimoto; (Japan) Hiroshi Hamaguchi
- Debut: 2006 Suzuka GT 300 km
- Last season: 2012
Races	Wins	Poles	F/Laps
59	4	8	9
- Constructors' Championships: 1 (2007)
- Drivers' Championships: 0

The Mooncraft Shiden MC/RT-16 (Japanese: ムーンクラフト・紫電 MC/RT-16, Hepburn: Mūnkurafuto Shiden MC/RT-16) is a Japanese Super GT GT300 class prototype race car introduced by Mooncraft in 2006.

== Etymology ==
The Shiden's name is a callback to the Mooncraft Shiden 77, a Group 6 sports prototype racing car produced by Mooncraft to compete in the Fuji Grand Champion Series; the Shiden itself was named after the Kawanishi N1K World War II fighter plane, nicknamed the "Shiden". The Shiden 77 was not a particularly successful race car and was ultimately destroyed in a crash during a Fuji Long Distance Series race.

== Specifications ==
The Shiden's basic design is based on a Riley Technologies MkXI chassis; despite being based on the MkXI, virtually no parts are shared with the car apart from the chassis. The use of a Riley chassis is hinted at in the car's internal designation, "MC/RT-16". In comparison to other GT300 cars, the Shiden resembled a sports prototype more than a GT3 car. The Shiden itself is said to be a "modern recreation" of its direct ancestor, the Shiden 77, for modern competition.

The Shiden uses a fiberglass composite body, with impact-absorbing structures added to reinforce the body at certain points. The Shiden is powered by a Toyota 1UZ-FE 4.2 L naturally-aspirated V8 tuned by Toda Racing; this engine would later be bored and stroked to 4.4 L in 2007. This engine is mated to a Xtrac 6-speed sequential manual shifted using a shift lever. Safety was a major concern when designing the Shiden, with the car featuring the aforementioned crash structures and a FIA-compliant roll cage design allowing ample space in the cockpit.

The proposed road-going version of the Shiden would have featured a smaller spoiler but would have retained a similar silhouette.

== Development and racing history ==
The Shiden was unveiled on 1 December 2005 in an online press release from Mooncraft. Designed by Takuya Yura, the Shiden was Yura's vision for the ultimate road car, featuring the best driving performance and safety features. Yura was also involved in the design of the original Shiden 77 which this car was named after. The Shiden was advertised to give drivers pleasure that they had never felt before with its driving characteristics.

The road-going Shiden was announced to enter production in February 2006; no details on pricing or production numbers were given. At the same time, Mooncraft announced that a privateer team would take delivery of a racing version of the Shiden road car to compete in the 2006 Super GT Series in the GT300 class. No road cars would be built, with the GT Association saying that building a road-going version was not required to allow the car's participation in the series; no further mention of a road-going Shiden would be made in future press releases.

Cars Tokai Dream28, the racing arm of Honda Cars Tokai, a chain of Honda dealerships based in Tōkai, Aichi, took delivery of a Shiden for the 2006 Super GT Series, replacing the Vemac RD320R they had raced in 2005. The team's lineup of Kazuho Takahashi and Hiroki Katoh would remain unchanged from 2005. From the first race at Suzuka, the Shiden was immediately competitive, consistently scoring points over the season as well as multiple pole positions; at Autopolis, the Shiden converted a pole position to a win. A non-score at the November Fuji race gave the #7 RE Amemiya Mazda RX-7 of Tetsuya Yamano and Hiroyuki Iiri and the Shiden a tie in points; the Shiden would finish the season strongly with second in the standings, losing to Yamano and Iiri on countback.

Takahashi and Katoh would continue driving the Shiden for 2007. The Shiden's competitiveness continued for 2007, with two second places to start off the season. The Shiden would score points consistently, with the highlight of the season being a win at the International POKKA 1000km at Suzuka; by the end of round 8 at Autopolis, the Shiden was leading both the drivers's and teams's championships. A victory by the #101 apr Toyota MR-S of Kazuya Oshima and Hiroaki Ishiura allowed them to tie in the standings with the Shiden, with the #101 car winning on countback having won twice compared to the Shiden winning only once. Despite this, Cars Tokai Dream28 were the 2007 Teams's Champions with 106 points.

2008 was a quieter year for the Shiden as the team scored no wins throughout the season; their best finish was a 2nd place in Motegi. The team finished fourth in the standings. Takahashi and Katoh would start off the 2009 season in 6th, with Takahashi being replaced by Hiroki Yoshimoto after the first round for the rest of the season. The Shiden would bounce back in 2009, winning Sepang and claiming the fastest lap. The team would finish the season sixth in the standings with 63 points. For 2010, Hiroshi Hamaguchi would replace Takahashi, although he remained in the team as third driver for the Suzuka 1000 km. The Shiden would pole, set the fastest lap and win the Sugo race; this was the last win for the Shiden and any JAF-GT Category C or D car in the series. Two second places in other races throughout the season elevated them to 4th in the standings by the end of the year.

For 2011, the Shiden was given a striking purple and green livery resembling that of the Eva-01 mecha as seen in the anime Neon Genesis Evangelion. Takahashi returned to drive the car in 2011; the car was still a reliable point scorer but other GT cars were starting to become much faster and more competitive and the Shiden's Riley-based chassis was starting to show its obsolescence. The team finished the season 10th in the standings. The driver pairing of Takahashi and Katoh would continue for 2012, as well as the Evangelion-inspired livery. The season started strongly for the Shiden, with a 7th at Okayama and a 2nd at Fuji, but after this race the Shiden's performance took a significant slump; while the car was still reliable, when it did finish it was in a low non-scoring position. The car failed to start at Sepang and failed to qualify at Autopolis. This combination of results led the Shiden to 11th in the standings, its lowest position yet.

Changes to the Super GT rule structure were enacted in 2012 to take effect the next season; this would lead to the phasing out of JAF-GT Category C and D vehicles from competition, categories spanning prototype sports cars based on modified sports cars with few or no road-going counterparts. As a result of the rule changes, the Shiden was no longer able to race in the series. Yura announced the car's retirement on his personal social media page. Cars Tokai Dream28 would replace their Shiden with a McLaren MP4-12C GT3 for the 2013 Super GT Series.

After the Shiden's retirement, the car was returned to Mooncraft. Yura intended to sell the car with two spare Toyota 1UZ-FE V8 engines and a full set of parts although ultimately the car did not find a buyer and remains with Mooncraft; Yura may have also planned to revive the concept of a road-going Shiden. The car was then sent into storage, it having no opportunities to race due to constant regulation changes, although it was displayed publicly in 2017 at a Formula SAE Japan event in Shizuoka.
