= Mazda 727C =

The Mazda 727C is a prototype racing car that was built for Mazdaspeed for the 24 Hours of Le Mans in the Group C2 class. It replaced the 717C in 1984 as an evolution of the Mooncraft-built design and used the same 2-rotor 13B Wankel engine as the previous model.

Two 727Cs were entered in the 1984 24 Hours of Le Mans, finishing 4th and 6th in the C2 class. However, a pair of Lola T616s run by B.F. Goodrich Company used the same Mazda engine and were successful in beating both 727Cs, claiming 1st and 3rd.

The 727C was used a few more times in the 1984 World Sportscar Championship season, managing a mere 10th place in the C2 manufacturer's championship, behind two separate teams of privateers. The 727C was then replaced by the 737C in 1985.
