= Yamaha OX99-11 =

Yamaha OX99-11 V12
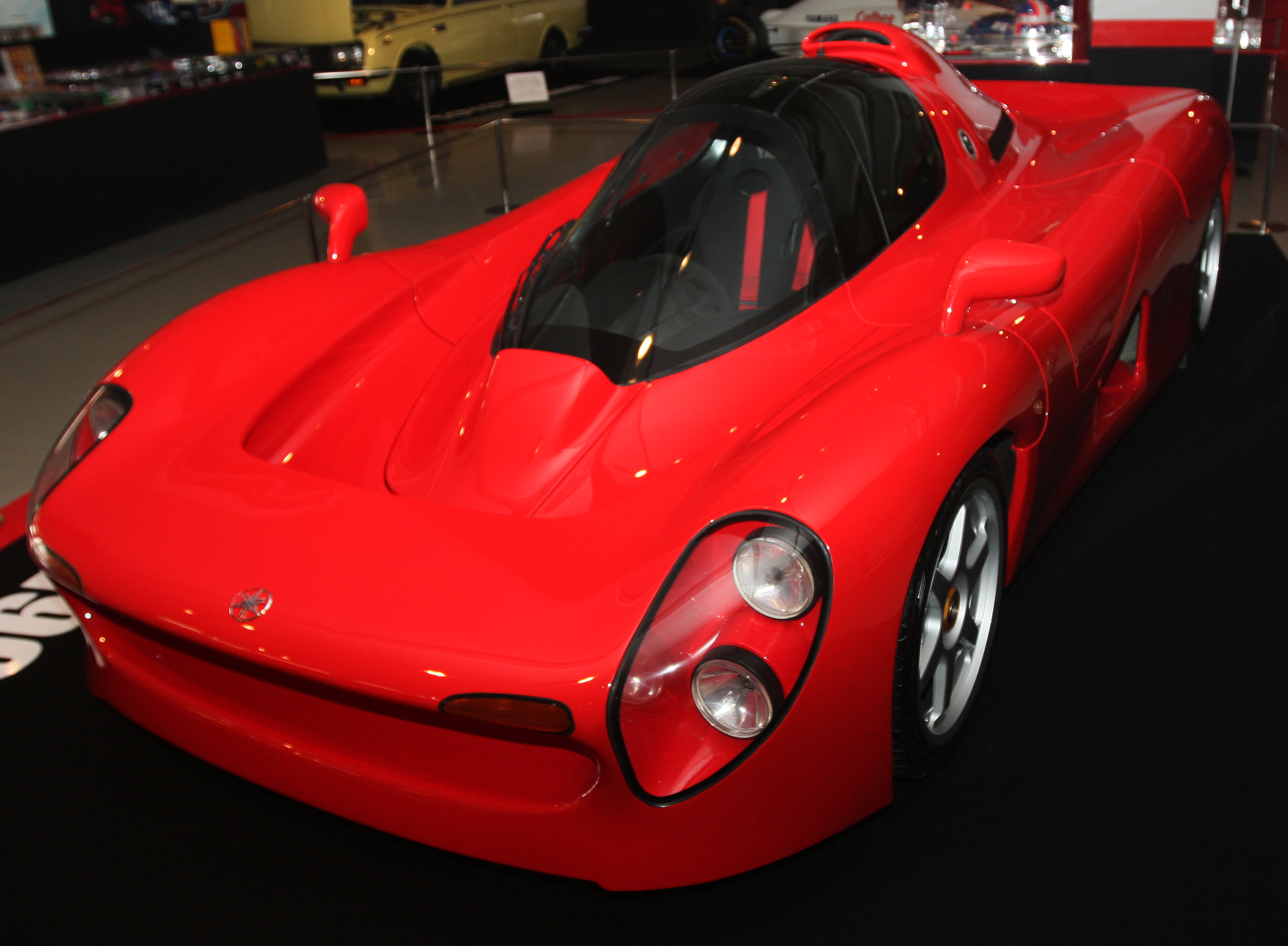

Overview
- Manufacturer: Yamaha Motor Company
- Production: 1992 (3 prototypes)
- Designer: Takuya Yura

Body and chassis
- Class: Sports car (S)
- Body style: 1-door coupe
- Layout: RMR layout
- Doors: Canopy doors

Powertrain
- Engine: 3.5L OX99 70° V12; 400 hp (300 kW) @ 10,000 rpm
- Transmission: 6-speed manual

Dimensions
- Wheelbase: 2,650 mm (104.3 in)
- Length: 4,400 mm (173.2 in)
- Width: 2,000 mm (78.7 in)
- Height: 1,220 mm (48.0 in)
- Curb weight: 1,150 kg (2,540 lb)

The Yamaha OX99-11 was a sports car project designed by Yamaha's subsidiary Ypsilon Technology and International Automotive Design (IAD) that was supposed to enter production in 1994.

== Background ==
The OX99-11 project was a collaboration between Yamaha and International Automotive Design (IAD), but budget disagreements between the two parties led the project to be handed to Yamaha's subsidiary, Ypsilon Technology. It was aimed to bring Formula One technology to the road.

== Design and technical ==
The OX99-11 was built on a carbon fiber monocoque chassis with hand-beaten aluminium panels for the bodywork, including the central driver's and a passenger seat positioned behind.

The OX99-11 was powered by a 3.5L V12 engine derived from Yamaha's Formula One engine detuned to 400 hp (300 kW) @ 10,000 rpm, longitudinally mounted with a 6-speed manual transmission.

== Cancellation and demise ==
The global economic recession of the early 1990s led to significant challenges to the project. High costs ($800,000 to $1,000,000 per unit) a six month build time resulted in delays and financial struggles, and finally the cancellation of the project.

One of the known prototypes was located at Iwata, Shizouka at Yamaha Motor Company's Communication Plaza while the other two are in private hands.
