= Mooncraft =

Japanese racing car manufacturer

Mooncraft Co., Ltd.
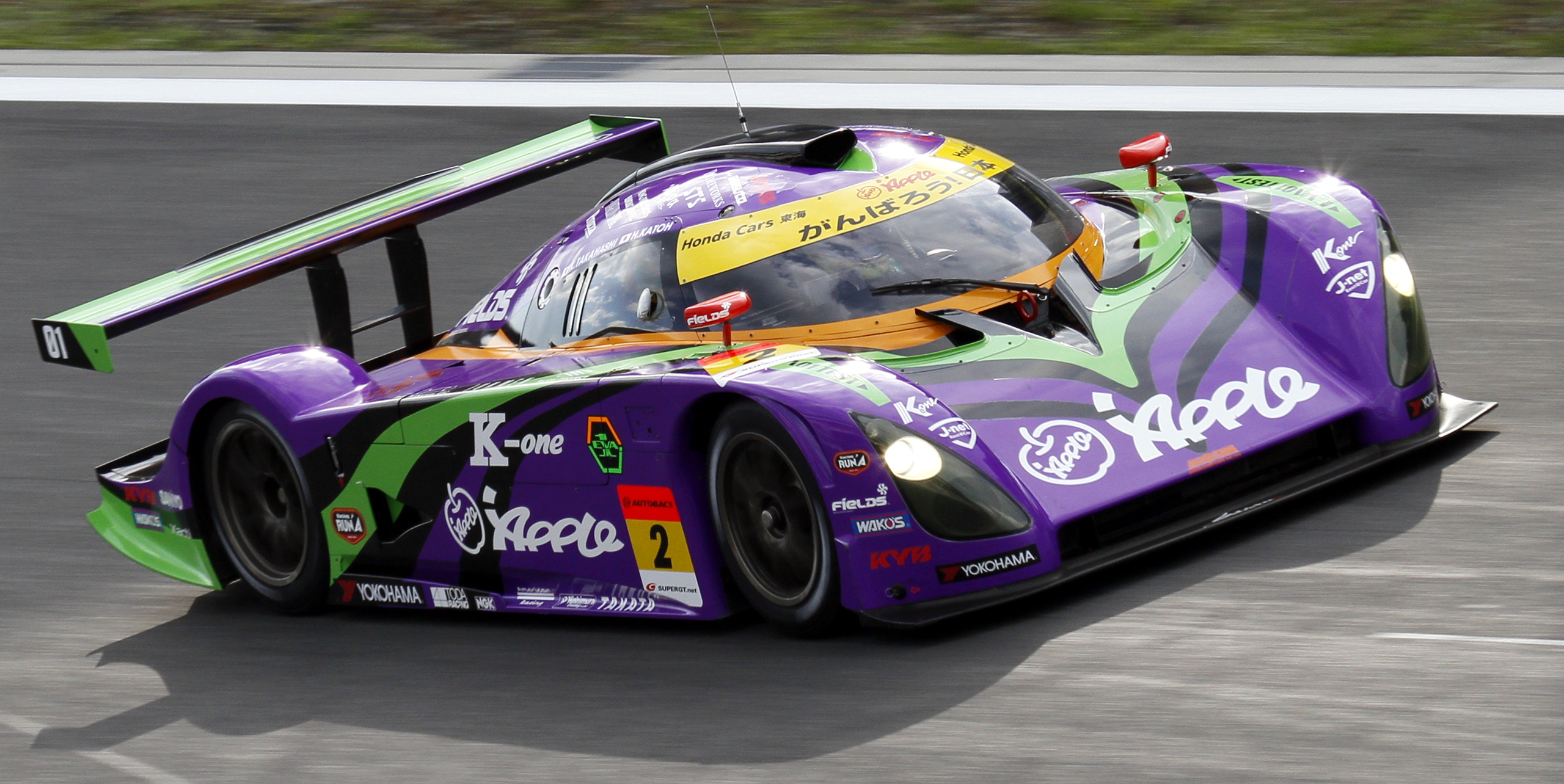
- Mooncraft Shiden
- Company type: Kabushiki gaisha
- Industry: Automotive
- Founded: 1975
- Founder: Takuya Yura
- Headquarters: Gotemba, Shizuoka, Japan
- Area served: Worldwide
- Key people: Takuya Yura; Masato Furukawa
- Parent: Toray Carbon Magic
- Website: https://www.mooncraft.jp/

Mooncraft Co., Ltd. (Japanese: ムーンクラフト株式会社, Hepburn: Mūnkurafuto Kabushiki Gaisha) is a Japanese race car constructor based in Shizuoka, Japan.

== History ==
Mooncraft was founded by Takuya Yura in 1975. The company was created to design and market race cars within Japan and abroad.

The company created the Shiden 77 in 1977, driven by Noritake Takahara in the Fuji Grand Champion Series; the car featured a unique design that won it many fans although it was not competitive and was ultimately destroyed in a crash. In addition to their own cars, Mooncraft also constructed cars for other teams and manufacturers; one of their most notable early creations was the Mazda 717C, which won in its class at the 1983 24 Hours of Le Mans, the first Japanese car to do so.

Mooncraft formed their own race team in 1985; since then, Mooncraft vehicles have been used in all forms of motorsports. A new wind tunnel facility was installed in the company's new facility in Gotemba in 1986. Toray Carbon Magic acquired Mooncraft in 2018.

== Models ==
Pre-Mooncraft

- Formula 2000 (1970)
- RQC Nova (1970)
- Augusta MK 3 (1972)
- Tokyo Giken FJ1300 (1973)
- Brabham BT36 Kai (1973)
- Nova 01 (1974)

Sports prototype

- Mazda RX-3 251 (1979)
- Mazda RX-7 252 (1980)
- Mazda RX-7 253 (1981)
- Mazda RX-7 254 (1982)
- Mazda 717C (1983)
- MCS Guppy (1983)
- Mazda 727C (1984)
- Mazda 737C (1985)
- Mooncraft Shiden MC/RT-16 (2006)
- Lotus Evora MC GT300 (2015)

Open-wheel

- Nova 02 (1975)
- Nova 512 (1976)
- Nova 513 (1976)
- Nova 532 (1976)
- Kojima KE007 (1976)
- Mooncraft Luna Nuova (1977)
- Kojima KE009 (1977)
- Niki 79 (1979)
- Mooncraft MC-030 (1988)
- Mooncraft MC-031 (1988)
- Mooncraft MC-040 (1988)
- Mooncraft MC-041 (1989)
- Mooncraft MC-041B (1990)
- Lola T91/50 (1991)
- Mooncraft MC-060EL (1992)
- Lola MCS94 (1994)
- Lola MCS99 (1999)
- Mooncraft MC-080 (2009)
- Mooncraft MC-090 (2010)

Fuji Grand Champion

- March 73S Kai (1973)
- GRD S74 Kai (1974)
- Mooncraft March (1974)
- Mooncraft Shiden 77 (1977)
- McLaren M12 Kai (1977)
- Mooncraft Shiden Kai (1978)
- Nova 53S (1978)
- Nova 54S (1978)
- Mooncraft MCS (1979)
- Thunder LM39 (1979)
- Royce RM-1 (1980)
- Mooncraft Kibo (1980)
- Mooncraft MCS 2 (1981)
- Mooncraft MCS 3 (1982)
- Mooncraft MCS 4 (1983)
- Mooncraft MCS 5 (1984)
- Mooncraft MCS 6 (1985)
- Mooncraft MCS 7 (1986)
- Mooncraft MCS 8 (1988)
- Mooncraft MCS 9 (1989)
- Dallara GC21 (2002)

Sports cars

- Nissan Super Silhouette race cars
  - Nissan Silvia Turbo (1981)
  - Nissan Bluebird SSS Turbo (1982)
  - Nissan Skyline RS Silhouette Formula (1982)
- Yamaha OX99-11 (1992)
- Mooncraft Moke Sport (1993)
- Mooncraft Tottini (1995)
- Mooncraft Koshiden (2006)
- Mooncraft Koshiden-R (2006)
