= March 74S =

Sports prototype race car

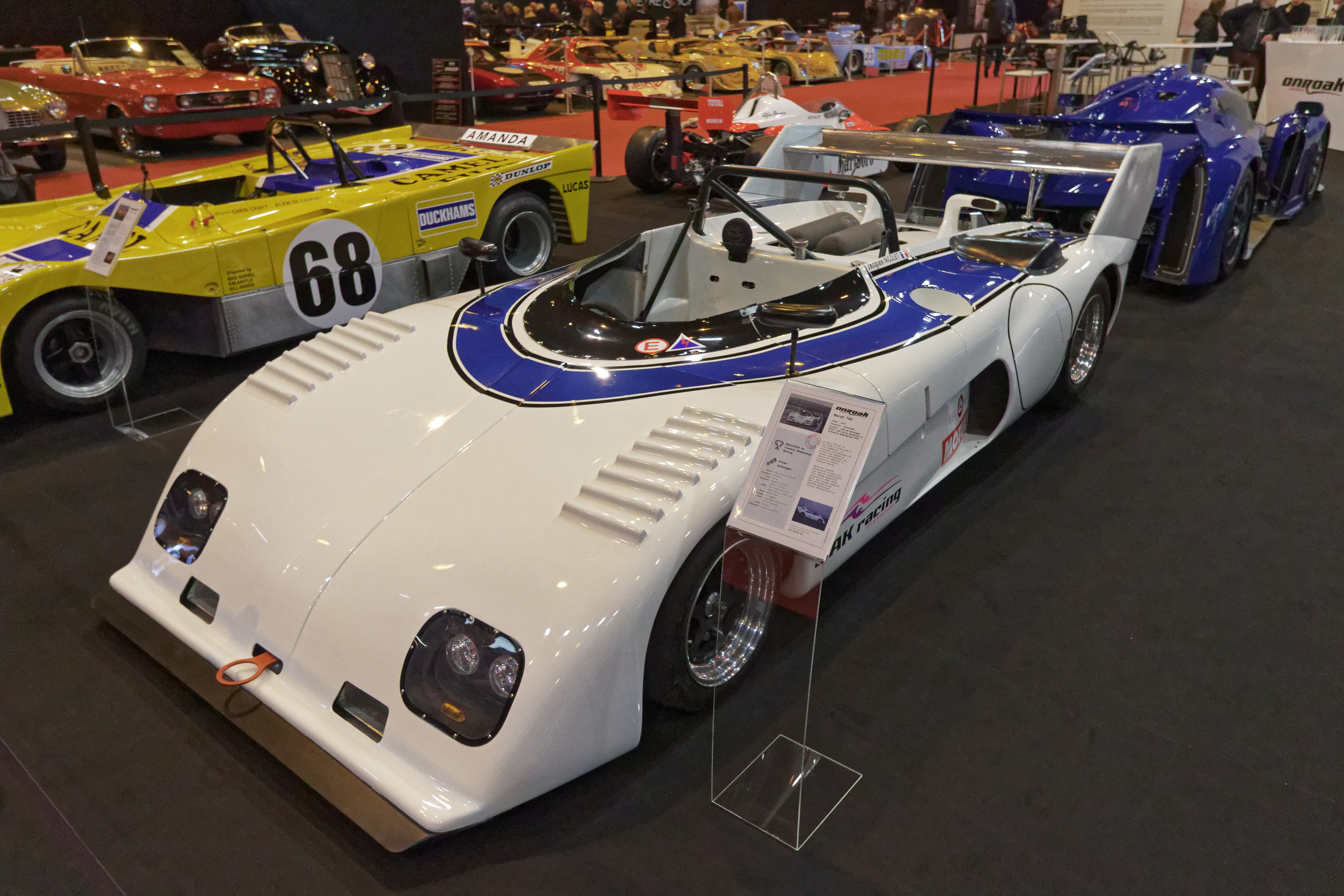
- Category: Group 5

Technical specifications
- Chassis: fibreglass body on aluminium monocoque
- Suspension: double wishbones, push-rod actuated coil springs over shock absorbers, anti-roll bar (front) twin lower links, single upper links, trailing arms, coil springs over dampers, anti-roll bar (rear)
- Engine: Ford-Cosworth DFV 3.0 L (183.1 cu in) DOHC 90° V8 naturally-aspirated mid-engined Ford-Cosworth BDA 2.0 L (122.0 cu in) DOHC I4 naturally-aspirated mid-engined
- Transmission: Hewland FT200 5-speed manual
- Power: 280–400 hp (210–300 kW)
- Weight: 525–700 kg (1,157–1,543 lb)
- Tires: Firestone

Competition history
- Debut: 1974 24 Hours of Le Mans

The March 74S is a prototype race car, designed, developed and built by British manufacturer March Engineering in 1975 for the FIA Group 5 class of sports car racing. It was a development on the earlier March 73S.
