= SW20 =

SW20 may refer to

- The chassis code for the second generation of Toyota MR2, equipped with S engines
- SW20, a postcode district in the SW postcode area
