= 1992 Yokohama 6-Hour for Production Cars =

Original layout of the Winton Circuit (1961–present)

The 1992 Yokohama 6-Hour for Production Cars was an endurance motor race staged at the Winton Circuit in Victoria, Australia on 29 November 1992. There were twenty one starters in the race, which was won by Mark Brame and Henry Draper driving a Suzuki Swift GTi.

== Results ==
Position	Drivers	No.	Car	Entrant	Laps
1	Mark Brame, Henry Draper		Suzuki Swift GTi		282
2	Steven Richards, Melinda Price	22	Nissan Pulsar SSS	Garry Rogers	281
3	Neal Bates, Peter McKay, Angas McKenzie		Toyota MR2	Toyota	280
4	Craig Dare, Brian Callaghan		Ford Laser TX3 Turbo 4WD		279
5	Iain Thompson, Eric Houghton, Gary Waldon		Mitsubishi Lancer GSR		279
6	Kevin Burton, Mark Gibbs, Peter Vorst		Ford EBII Falcon		278
7	Colin Osborne, Ron Masing		Toyota Corolla S		278
8	Ferrier, Parsons, Robson		Suzuki Swift GTi		278
9	Bennett, Borg, Merlino		Toyota MR2		277
10	Bogut, Craig, Janssen		Suzuki Swift GTi		277
11					
12	Tim Lynas, Bob Jennings		Ford Laser TX3 Turbo 4WD		
?	Murray Carter, Peter Kyriakidis		Nissan Pulsar		
?	Kent Youlden, Brett Youlden		Ford Laser TX3		
?	Renato, Muscat		Hyundai		
?	Alexander		Toyota Corolla		
?	Brierley, Hinton		Holden Commodore		
?					
DNF	Burton		Mitsubishi Lancer		
DNF	Morriss, Lewis		Toyota Corolla		
DNF	Rohan Cooke, Andrew Harris, John Trimble		Mitsubishi Lancer GSR	Nascon Racing	58
