= Toyota MR2 =

Mid-engined, two-seat Japanese sports car

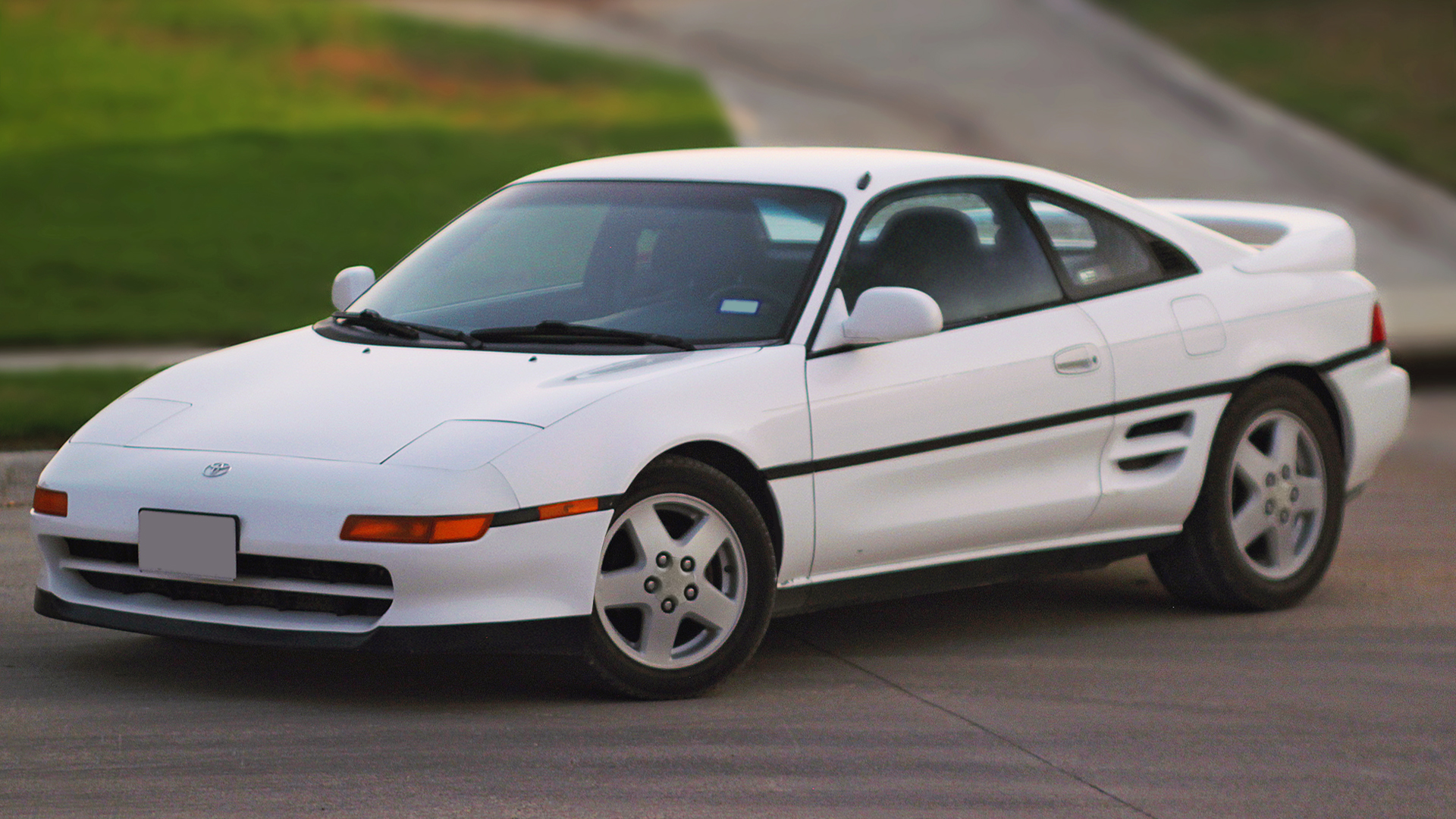
- Second generation MR2

Overview
- Manufacturer: Central Motors (part of the Toyota Motor Corporation)
- Also called: Toyota MR (France and Belgium)
- Production: 1984–2007
- Model years: 1985–2007
- Assembly: Japan: Sagamihara, Kanagawa (Central Motors)

Body and chassis
- Class: Sports car (S)
- Layout: Transverse mid-engine, rear-wheel drive

The Toyota MR2 is a two-seater sports car which was manufactured and marketed by Toyota from 1984 until 2007 over three generations. It was the first Japanese rear-mid-engine, rear-wheel-drive production car and was sold around the world. The first generation (W10) was produced from 1984 to 1989, the second generation (W20) from 1989 to 1999, and the third generation (W30) from 1999 to 2007.

Conceived as a small, economical and sporty car, the MR2 features a straight-four engine, transversely mounted in front of the rear axle, four-wheel disc brakes, and fully independent coilover suspension with MacPherson struts on each wheel.

The name MR2 stands for either "mid-ship run-about 2-seater" or "mid-engine, rear-wheel-drive, 2-seater". In French-speaking markets, the vehicle was renamed Toyota MR because the abbreviation "MR2" sounds like the profanity "merde" when spoken in French.

== Origins ==
The MR2 derived from a 1976 Toyota design project with the goal of a car which would be enjoyable to drive, yet still provide good fuel economy, although not necessarily a sports car. Design work began in 1979 when Akio Yoshida from Toyota's testing department started to evaluate alternatives for engine placement and drive method, finalizing a mid-transverse engine placement. Toyota called the 1981 prototype SA-X.

From its original design, the car evolved into a sports car, and further prototypes were tested both in Japan and in the US. Significant testing was performed on race circuits including Willow Springs, where former Formula One driver Dan Gurney tested the car.

All three generations were in compliance with Japanese government regulations concerning exterior dimensions and engine displacement. The MR2 appeared around the same time as the Honda CR-X and the Nissan EXA from Japan, the Pontiac Fiero and Ford EXP from North America, and about a decade after the VW Scirocco and Fiat X1/9 from Europe made their debut.

Toyota debuted its SV-3 concept car in October 1983 at the 25th Tokyo Motor Show, gathering press and audience publicity. The car was scheduled for a Japanese launch in the second quarter of 1984 under the name MR2.

== First generation (W10; 1984–1989) ==
W10
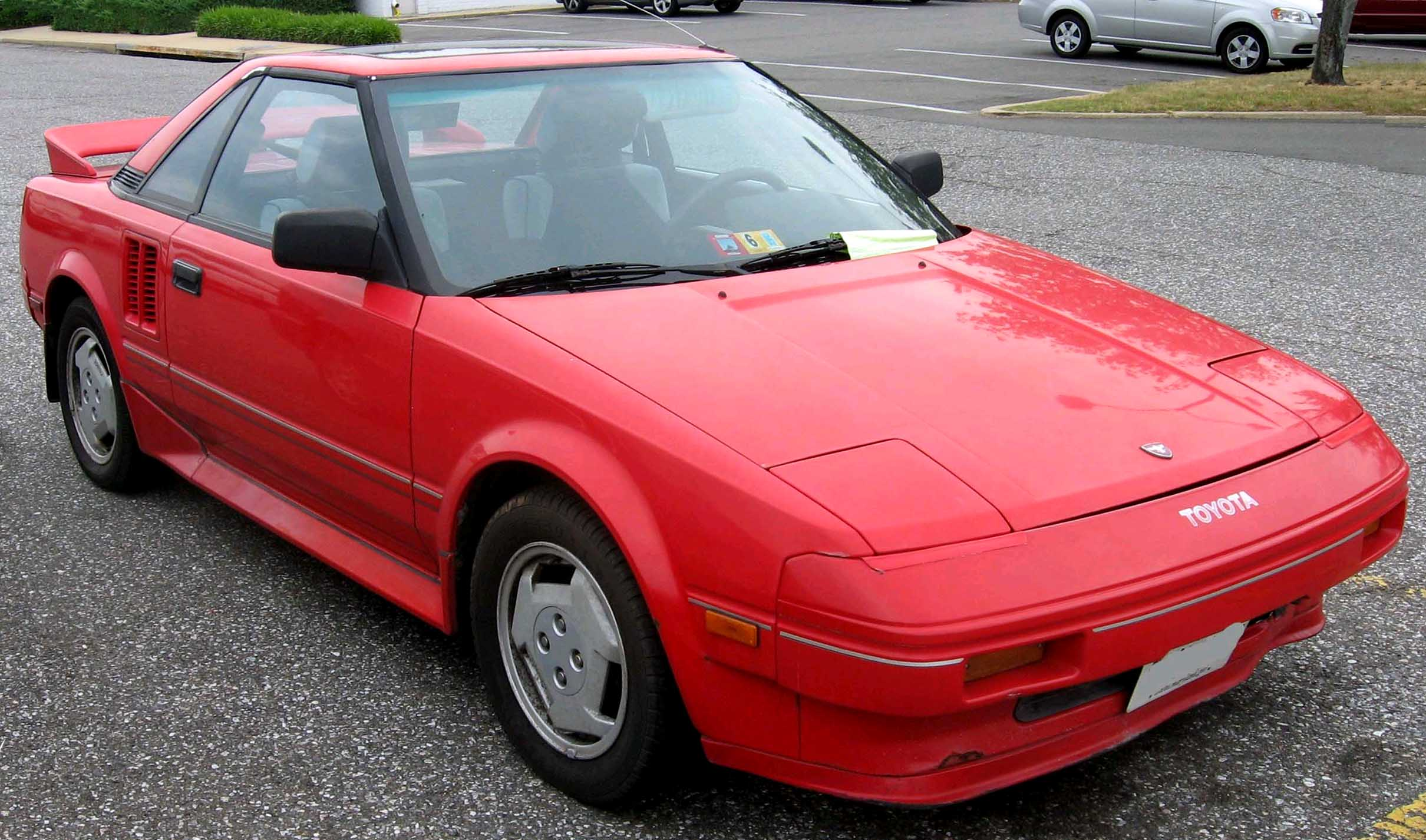
- MR2 AW11

Overview
- Also called: Toyota MR
- Production: June 1984–1989
- Designer: Seiichi Yamauchi (1981)

Body and chassis
- Body style: 2-door coupé or T-top

Powertrain
- Engine: 1.5 L 3A-LU I4 (AW10); 1.6 L 4A-GE DOHC I4 (AW11); 1.6 L 4A-GZE supercharged I4 (AW11)
- Transmission: 5-speed manual; 4-speed automatic

Dimensions
- Wheelbase: 2,319 mm (91.3 in)
- Length: 3,950 mm (155.5 in)
- Width: 1,666 mm (65.6 in)
- Height: 1,234 mm (48.6 in)
- Curb weight: 1,035 kg (2,282 lb) (1985 NA); 1,066 kg (2,350 lb) (1988 NA); 1,131 kg (2,493 lb) (1988 SC)

Toyota introduced the first-generation MR2 in 1984, designating it the model code "W10". When fitted with the 1.5-liter 3A engine, it was known as the "AW10". Likewise, the 1.6-liter 4A version is identified by the "AW11" code.

In Japan, the MR2 was marketed exclusively via Toyota's Toyota Auto Store and Toyota Vista Store, both rebranded in 1998 as Netz Toyota Store. At its introduction in 1984, the MR2 won the Car of the Year Japan.

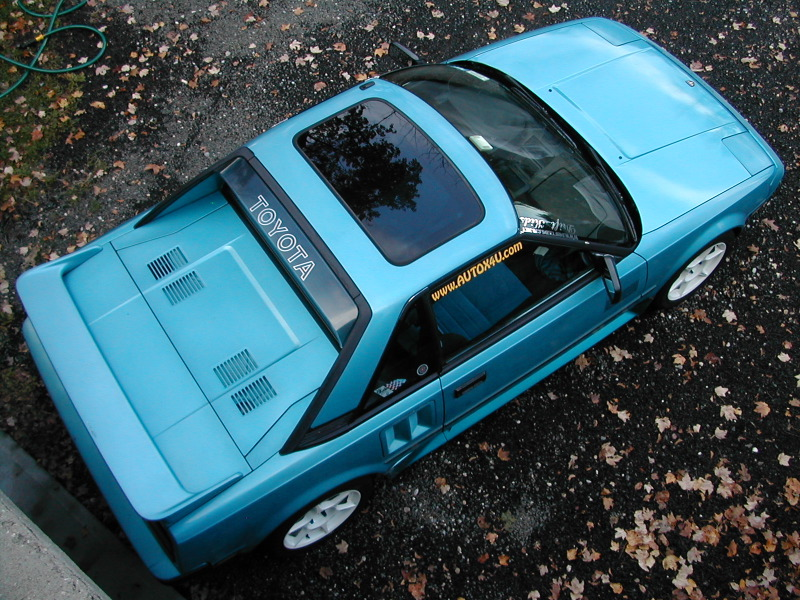
1986 MR2 in Light Blue Metallic

As Toyota engineered the MR2 to accommodate a 2-liter engine, its primary features included its light body (as low as 950 kg (2,094 lb) in Japan and 1,066 kg (2,350 lb) in the US), strong handling, and low-power small-displacement engine. The car is often referred to as the AW11, referring to the chassis code of the most common 1.6-liter, A-engined versions.

The MR2's suspension and handling were designed by Toyota with the help of Lotus engineer Roger Becker. Toyota's cooperation with Lotus during the prototype phase can be seen in the AW11, and it owes much to Lotus's sports cars of the 1960s and 1970s. Toyota's active suspension technology, called TEMS, was not installed. With five structural bulkheads, the MR2 was quite heavy for a two-seater of its size.

Toyota employed the naturally aspirated 4A-GE 1,587 cc (1.6 L; 96.8 cu in) straight-four engine, a DOHC four-valve-per-cylinder motor, borrowed from the E80 series Corolla. This engine was also equipped with Denso electronic port fuel injection and T-VIS variable intake geometry, giving the engine a maximum power output of 112 hp (84 kW) in the US, 128 hp (95 kW) in the UK, 116 or 124 PS (85 or 91 kW; 114 or 122 hp) in Europe (with or without catalytic converter), 118 hp (88 kW) in Australia and 130 PS (96 kW; 128 hp) in Japan. Japanese models were later detuned to 120 PS (88 kW; 118 hp). A five-speed manual transmission was standard, with a four-speed automatic available as an option.

Road tests delivered 0–60 mph (97 km/h) times in the mid- to high-8 second range and 1/4 mile (402 m) times in the mid- to high-16 second range, significantly faster than the four-cylinder Pontiac Fiero or Fiat X1/9. In the home market, the AW10 base model was offered, which used the more economical 1,452 cc (1.5 L; 88.6 cu in) 3A-U engine rated at 83 PS (61 kW).

In 1986 (1988 for the US market), Toyota introduced a supercharged engine for the MR2. Based on the same block and head, the 4A-GZE was equipped with a small Roots-type supercharger and a Denso intercooler. T-VIS was eliminated and the compression ratio was lowered to 8:1. It produced 145 hp (147 PS; 108 kW) at 6,400 rpm and 186 N⋅m; 137 lb⋅ft (19 kg⋅m) of torque at 4,400 rpm and accelerated the car from 0 to 100 km/h (62 mph) in 6.5 to 7.0 seconds. The supercharger was belt-driven but actuated by an electromagnetic clutch, so that it would not be driven except when needed, increasing fuel economy. Curb weight increased to as much as 2,494 lb (1,131 kg) for supercharged models, due to the weight of the supercharger equipment and a new, stronger transmission. A fuel selector switch was also added in some markets, to allow the car to run on regular unleaded fuel if required. In addition to the new engine, the MR2 SC was also equipped with stiffer springs, and received special "tear-drop" aluminum wheels. The engine cover had two raised vents (only one of which was functional) that visually distinguished it from the naturally aspirated models. It was also labeled "SUPER CHARGER" on the rear trunk and body mouldings behind both doors. This model was never offered outside of the Japanese and North American markets, although some cars were privately imported to other countries.

The first-generation MR-2 featured a unique eagle emblem as its logo. Although it disappeared when the second generation was introduced, the redesigned eagle emblem returned on the MR-S.

=== Yearly changes ===
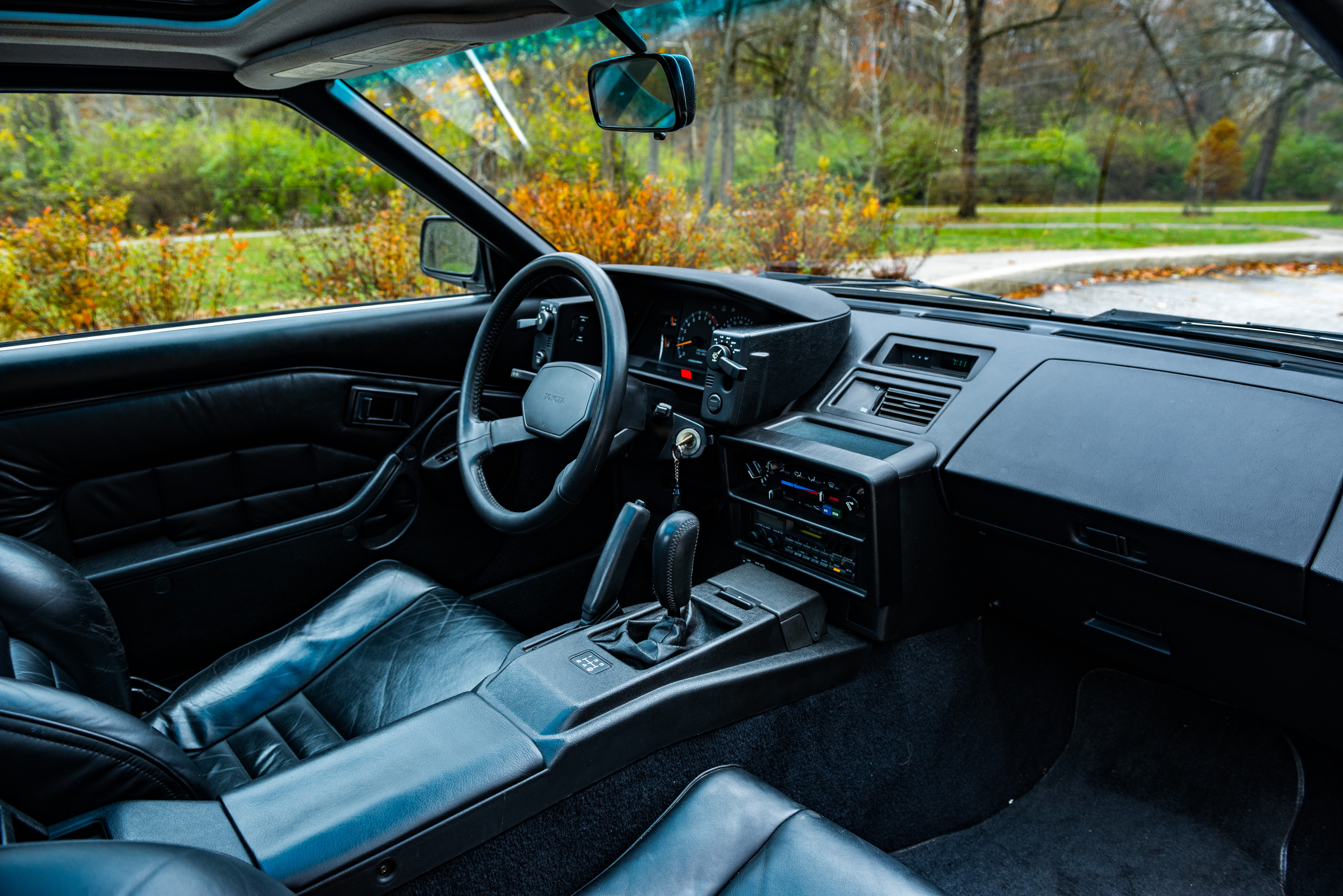
MK1A AW11 leather interior

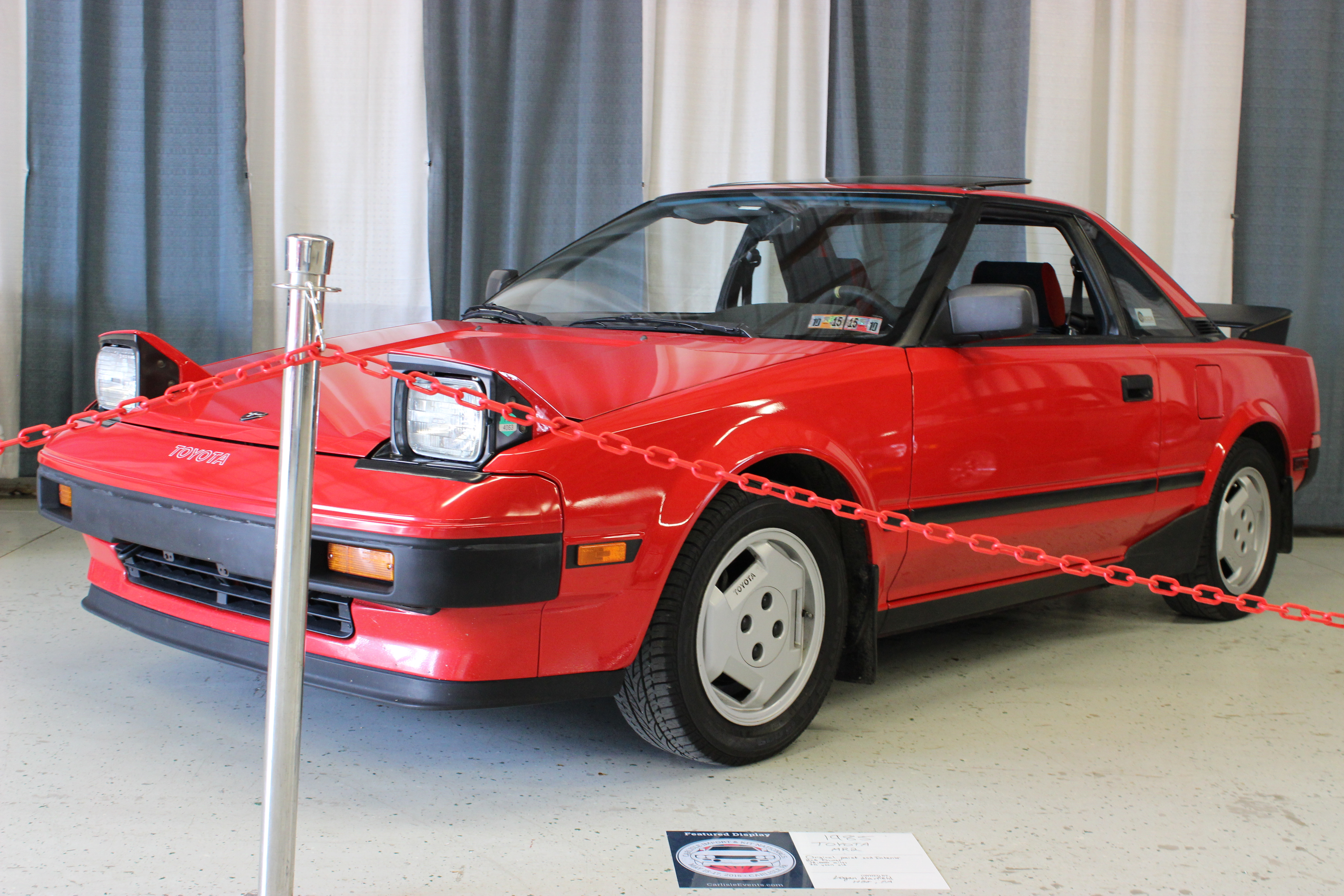
1985 AW11

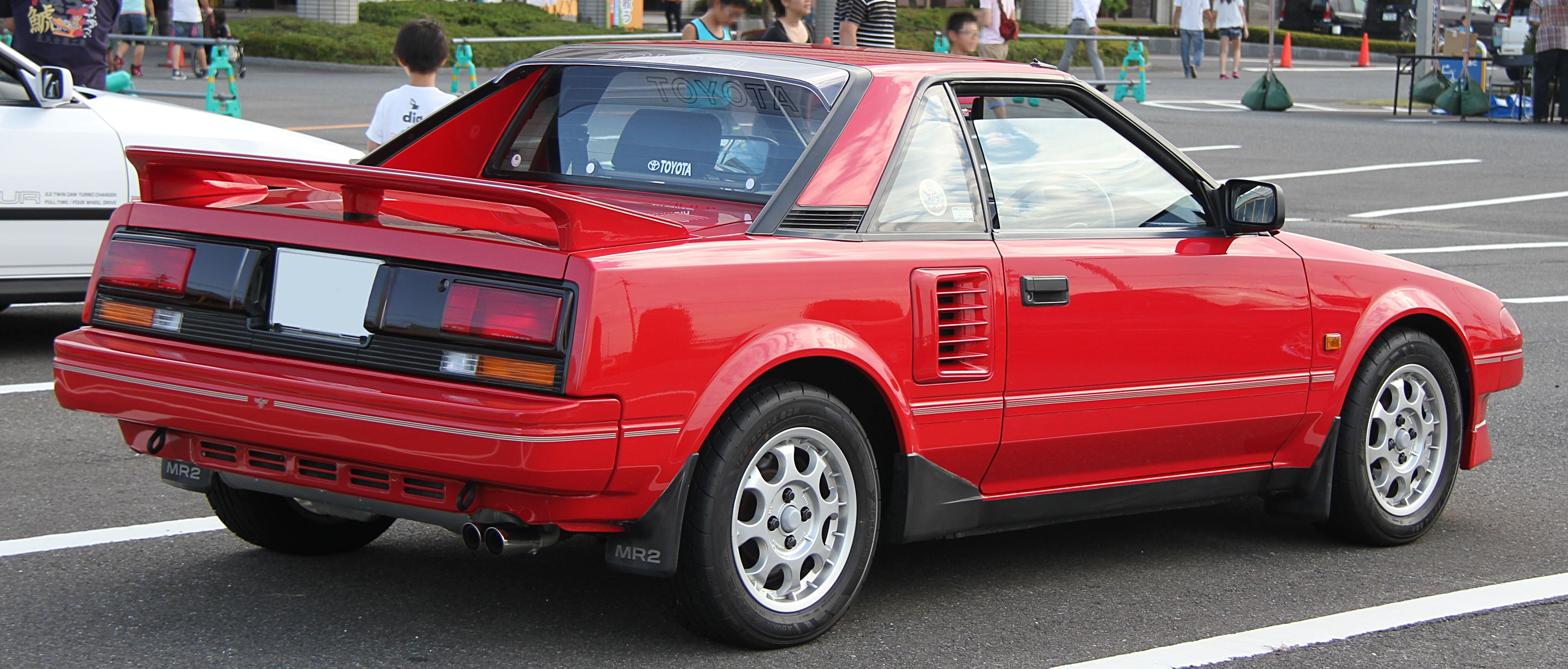
1987 Toyota MR2 rear view

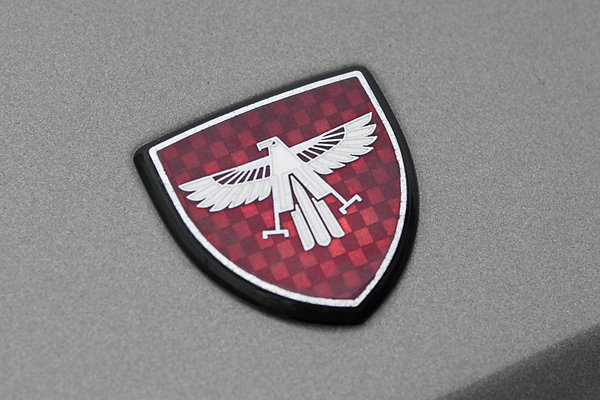
W10 eagle emblem

MK1a and MK1b are unofficial designations, but are frequently used by owners and vendors to distinguish between early production vehicles and later face-lifted models. While there are considerable differences detailed below, the most notable being that rear suspension components are not interchangeable between the MK1a and MK1b cars.

MK1a – June 1984 (MY 1985)

Original introduction

June 1985 (MY 1986)

- Japanese model changes:
  - Supercharged model introduced, offered with four-speed A/T or five-speed M/T
  - T-bar roof option available
- Color-keyed front lip and bumpers, side stripes, mudflaps, side skirts option now available
- Mudflap removed for models equipped with "Aerodynamic Spoiler Package" as the side skirts are full-length along the side
- Rear sunshade with Toyota logo above rear window added
- Third brake light added
- Leather interior option now available
- Bigger 212 mm flywheel and clutch for naturally aspirated models
- Rear anti-roll bar discontinued on North American models

MK1b Facelift – August 1986 (MY 1987)

- Powertrain changes:
  - Naturally aspirated 4A-GE now upgraded with a "7-rib" structural design as well as larger 42 mm (1.65 in) connecting rods. North American 4A-GE is also now rated at 115 hp (86 kW).
  - Intake camshaft valve cover now has the "16 Valve" portion in red instead of blue (this is not to be confused with the smallport third generation 4A-GE where the intake camshaft cover lettering has the entire "Twin Cam 16 Valve" in red)
  - EGR port repositioned on exhaust manifold to prevent cracking
  - Revised manual transmission internals.
  - Air filter rerouted to the trunk and continues around the trunk towards the air vent on the opposite side of the engine bay.
- Chassis changes:
  - Slight unibody changes
  - Radiator tilted back at an angle to force air down towards the bottom of the car
  - Revised rear suspension
  - Larger 258 mm (10.16 in) front and 262 mm (10.31 in) rear brake rotors
  - New tail lights (UK models retained old tail light design with different integrated reflector)
  - New front lip and front bumper
  - Radio antenna moved to rear right quarter panel for t-top/sunroof models
  - T-bar roof available in North America and Europe
- Interior changes:
  - LHD models now have parking brake on the right side
  - New center console, center armrest
  - Glovebox lock
  - Double-DIN radio, rear speakers added to the upper C pillar
  - Door panels, three-spoke steering wheel, gauge cluster markings
  - Seat changed to single-color velour and perforations added for leather seats

1987 (MY 1988)

- Supercharged model available in North America
- Color-coded side mirrors and new engine lid for supercharged models
- Full-length side skirts now standard on all models
- Heater water pipes changed from zinc-plated steel to brass

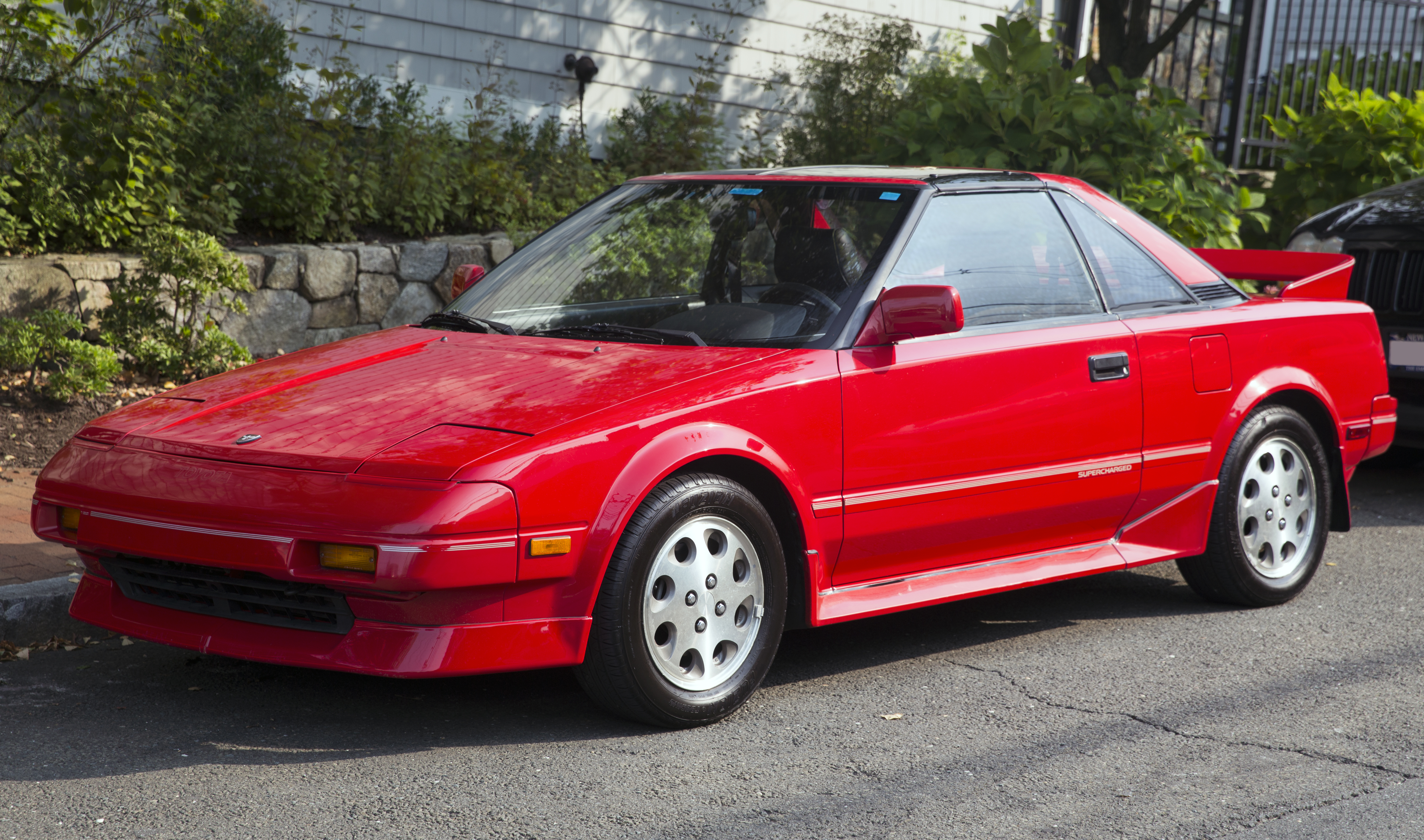
1988 Toyota MR2 Supercharged (North American model)

1988 (MY 1989)

- T-bar glass panels changed from smoked (clear) to mirrored (opaque)
- Color-code door handle and side mirrors for all models
- Incandescent third brake lamp replaced by LED strip integrated into the rear spoiler
- More aerodynamic wing mirrors introduced, with optional power retract mechanism
- North American supercharged models equipped with rear anti-roll bar

The changes in MY 1986 and MY 1987 occurred in parts. Instead of a drastic change in MY 1987 models for the above MK1b upgrades, some MK1a parts continued on in early MY 1987 cars while some MK1b parts came on MY 1986 cars as options. An example is that some MY 1987 cars still retained the old "flat" front bumper despite having MK1b upgrades everywhere else on the car. Some early MY 1987 7-rib engines came with the earlier blue top valve cover. This was also noticed in the rear sway bar removal for the MY 1986. Some MY 1986 cars have a rear sway bar, while the mounting tabs on the strut housing were either there for both sides, only one side, or none at all depending on when Toyota ran out of the older rear struts with mounting tabs as production used up parts.

=== Reception ===
American car magazines Road & Track and Car and Driver both chose the MR2 on their "ten best" car lists. The Australian Wheels magazine chose the 1988 MR2 as its favourite sports car. The MR2 was Motor Trend's Import Car of the Year for 1985. The MR2 was also on Car and Driver magazine's Ten Best list for 1986 and 1987. In 2004, Sports Car International ranked the MR2 number eight on the list of Top Sports Cars of the 1980s.

In 1988 and 1989 Toyota produced two final production runs of fully optioned "Super Edition" MR2s, based upon the supercharged Japanese market model, and only sold in Japan. The 1988 'Super Edition' was a run of 300 units, had white/gold two-tone paint, bronze glass, unique half-leather and half-cloth seats, along with a MOMO-commissioned steering wheel and gear knob. The 1989 model, a run of 270 units, featured a special Midnight Blue paint, the MOMO-commissioned steering wheel and gear knob, Recaro "Milano" seats with matching door panels. The 1989 model also benefited from some of the last G-Limited model options, such as the LED rear spoiler brake light and more aerodynamic wing mirrors. Both "Super Edition" models had unique decals on the rear visor and side stripes.

=== Motorsport (W10) ===
==== Toyota 222D rally car ====
While Toyota's front-engine, rear-drive Celica rally cars proved dominant in the African Group B rallies of the 1980s, they were at a disadvantage on the twistier European stages. Thus, Toyota Team Europe started a rally project in 1985, codenamed "222D" based on the MR2, for competition in Group S and potentially Group B. Though somewhat similar on the outside, it is clear that the prototype had very little in common with the production car although the two appear to share the same factory AW11 floor pan. Little else is known about the project as it never competed. With Group B cancelled in 1986, the proposed Group S regulations suffered the same fate, and the remaining prototypes were reduced to museum pieces and private collections. Supposedly eleven prototypes were made, of which eight were destroyed during testing, leaving only three known examples: Two in black, one stored at Toyota Gazoo's facility in Cologne and one sold to a private collector in 2017, one in white, with a 50mm lengthened wheelbase and a more production styled body located in Tokyo.

Although the 222D was still a prototype, it made it very far into development before Group B was canceled. Of the rumored eleven built, eight were destroyed in testing, indicating Toyota was considering bringing the 222D to competition. However, the short wheelbase proved to be a challenge during testing, as the 222D also suffered from enormous turbo lag (as did most of the competitive Group B cars), but paired with the extremely short wheel base made driving at speed almost impossible.Toyota Team Europe owner Ove Anderson describes: "you never knew what it was going to do. With such a short wheelbase and such power in such a light car it could swap ends at any time, and without any warning".

During a surprise appearance at the 2006 Goodwood Festival of Speed, Toyota drove and displayed a black 222D. The race-ready car weighed around 750 kg (1,650 lb) and its transverse-mounted, four-cylinder, turbocharged engine (what appears to be a 503E race engine, though other prototypes may have used the 4T-GTE) was reported to produce as much as 750 hp (559 kW).

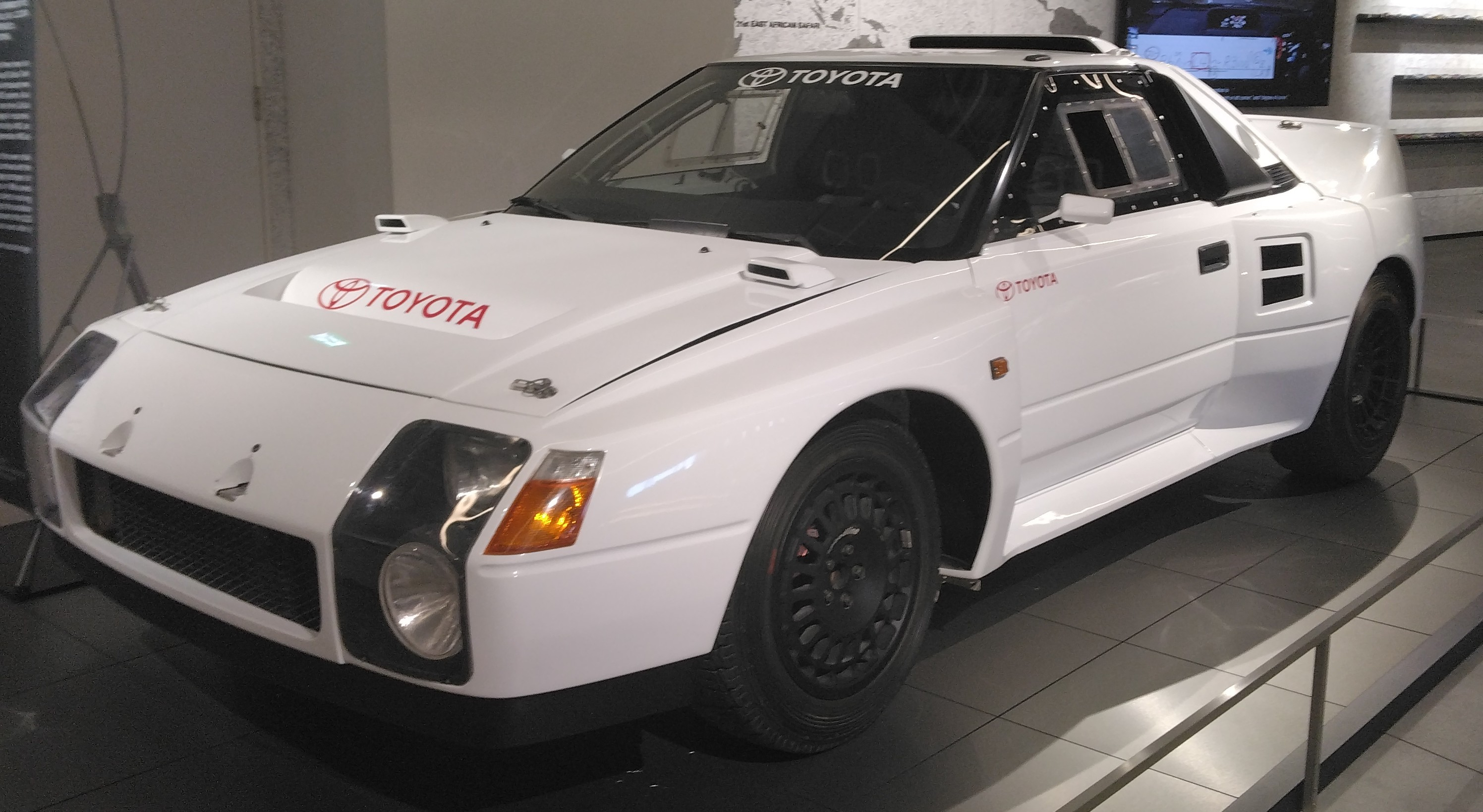
Toyota WRC Group S 222D MR2 Prototype

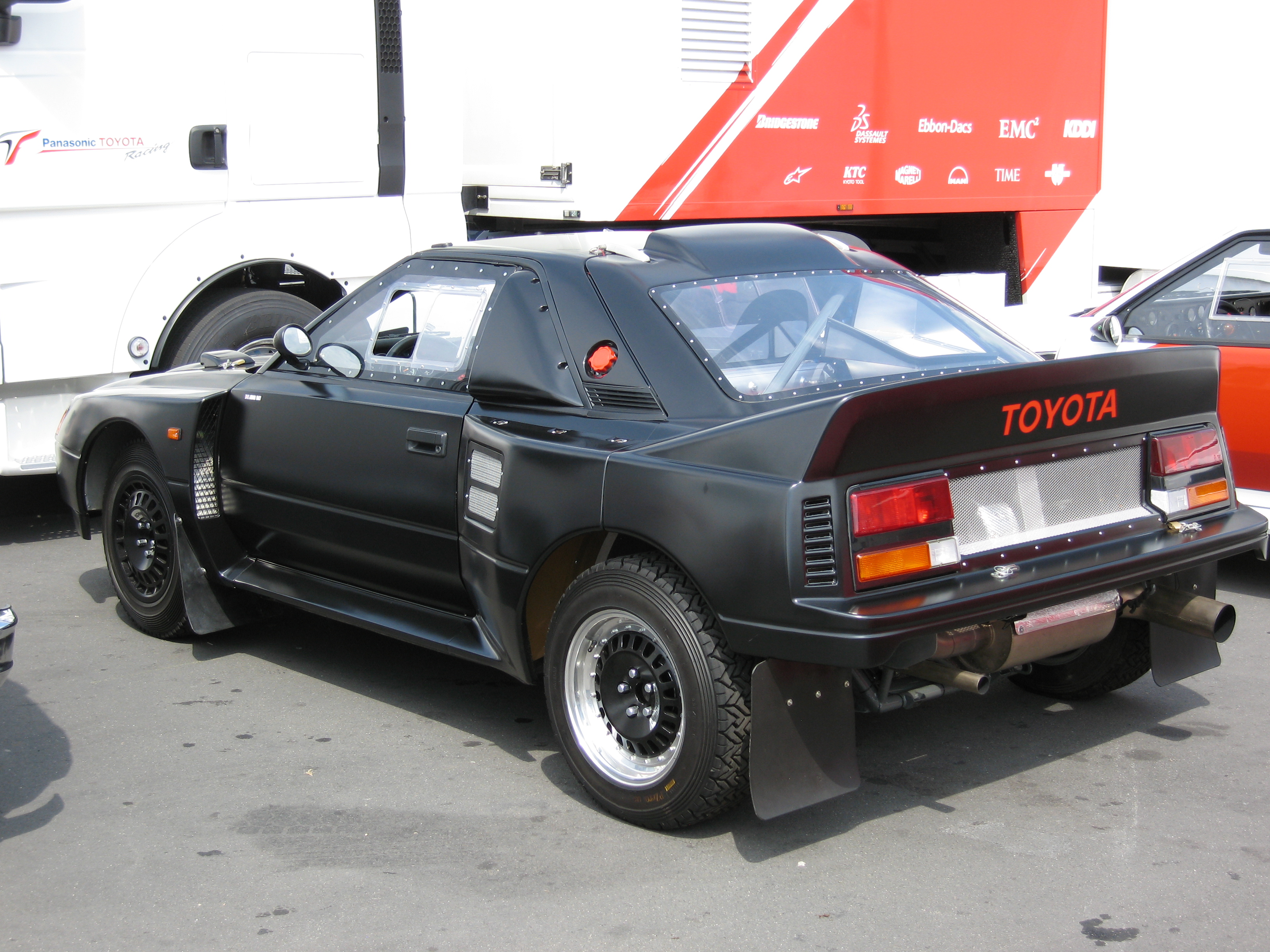
A black Toyota 222D rally car

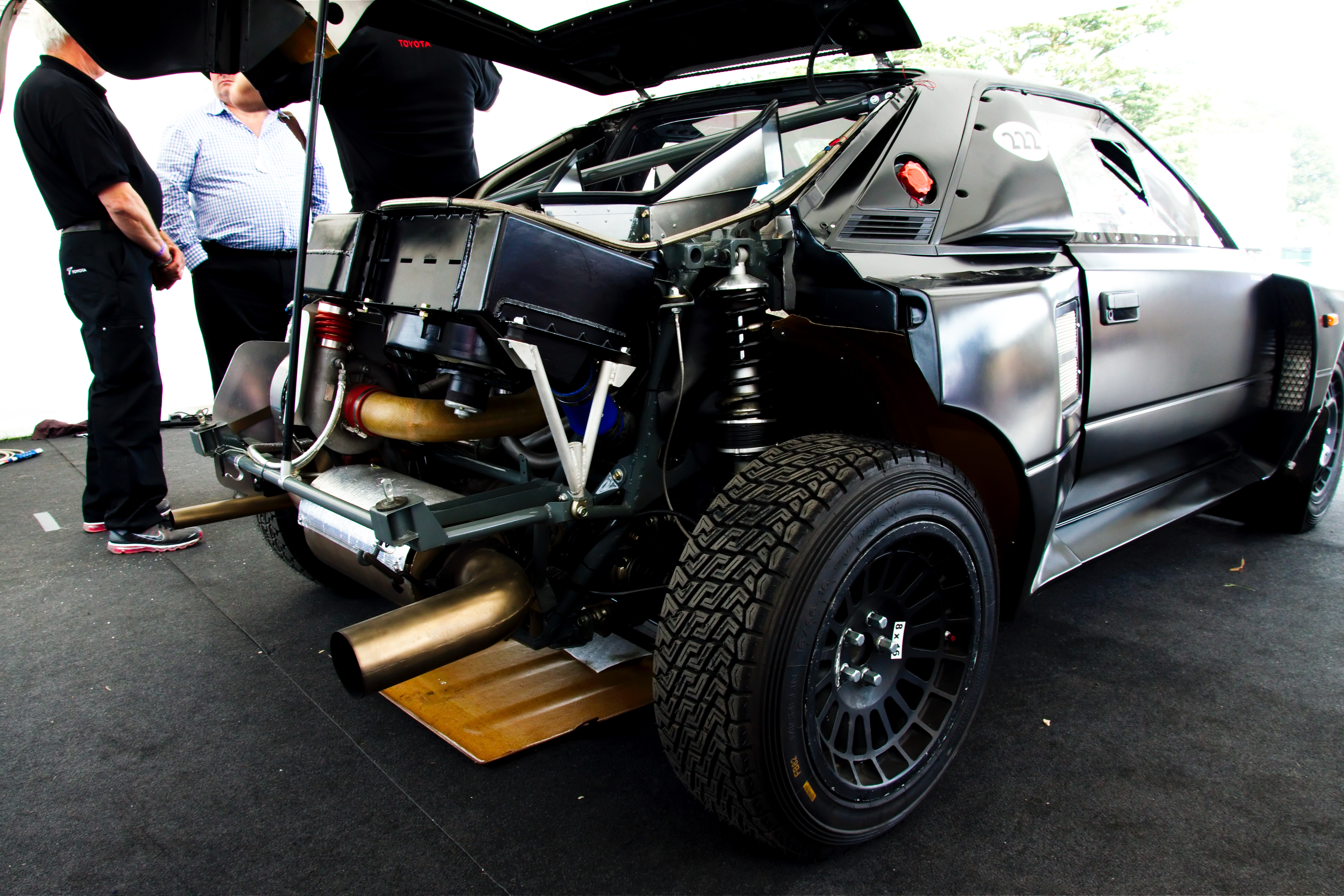
The 222D's engine bay exposed

== Second generation (W20; 1989–1999) ==
W20
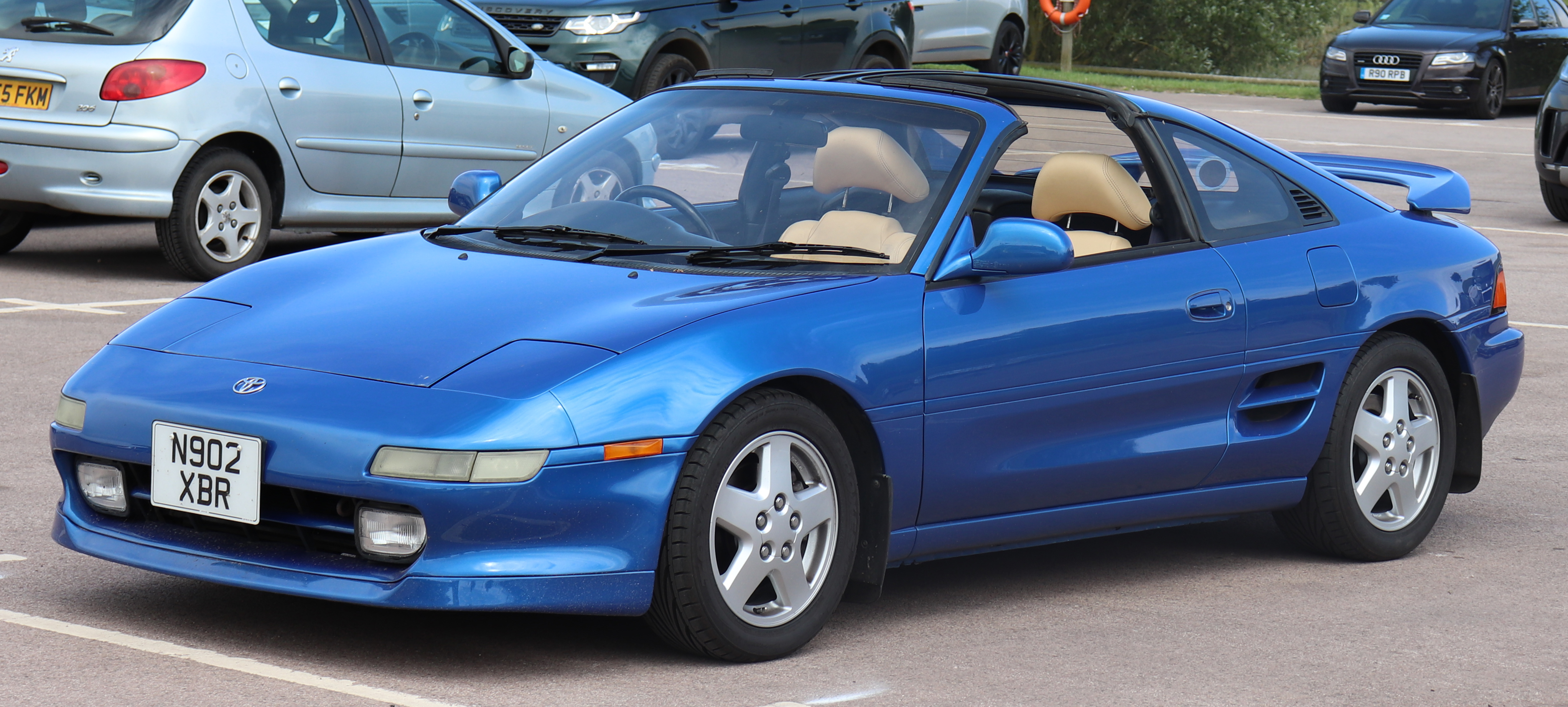

Overview
- Also called: Toyota MR
- Production: 1989 – August 1999
- Designer: Kunihiro Uchida (1987); Tadashi Nakagawa (roadster)

Body and chassis
- Body style: 2-door coupé or T-top

Powertrain
- Engine: 2.0 L 3S-FE/3S-GE I4 (SW20); 2.0 L 3S-GTE turbo I4 (SW20); 2.2 L 5S-FE I4 (SW21)
- Transmission: 5-speed manual; 4-speed automatic

Dimensions
- Wheelbase: 2,400 mm (94.5 in)
- Length: 4,170 mm (164.2 in)
- Width: 1,695 mm (66.7 in)
- Height: 1,235–1,240 mm (48.6–48.8 in)
- Curb weight: 1,250 kg (2,755 lb) (1993 T GTS Hardtop); 1,310 kg (2,888 lb) (1991 T T-top); 1,179 kg (2,599 lb) (1991 NA)

The MR2 went through a redesign in 1989 (though North America did not receive them until early 1990 as 1991 models). The new car was larger, weighed 350 to 400 lb (159 to 181 kg) more than its predecessor due to having a more luxurious and spacious cabin, larger engine sizes, sturdier transaxle, and a more durable suspension setup. The overall design of the automobile received more rounded, streamlined styling, with some calling the MR2 SW20 a "baby Ferrari" or "poor man's Ferrari" due to design cues similar to the Ferrari 308 GTB/GTS or Ferrari 348.

Like the AW11 before it, Toyota focused on fine-tuning the handling capabilities of the SW20, seeking advice from professional race car drivers, including Dan Gurney of Formula One, NASCAR, and Le Mans fame.

When the AW11 was still in production and before the SW20 was officially shown to the public, several rumors were spreading stating that Toyota was building yet another mid-engine sports car, one that would have a 3.0-liter V6 engine that could directly compete with the 348, though this specific rumor was later shot down under the pretense that such a car would belong under the Lexus brand.

- Japanese market trim levels:
1. G with an NA 2.0L 3S-GE engine producing 165 PS (121 kW; 163 hp); with an A/T standard and an optional M/T. The G was the base model of the SW20 line-up. Standard features included: manual steering, manual climate control but no air conditioning, electric mirror adjustment but manual folding, and fabric door/seat trim. The rear spoiler was optional.
2. G-Limited with the NA 2.0L 3S-GE engine; an A/T was standard or an M/T was optional. The G-Limited was the higher-specification naturally aspirated SW20. Additional standard features: electric folding mirrors, power steering, steering fog lamps, and rear spoiler.
3. GT-S with a turbocharged 2.0L 3S-GTE engine producing 221 PS (163 kW; 218 hp); an M/T was the only choice. The GT-S had the same standard features as the G-Limited.
4. GT with the turbocharged 2.0L 3S-GTE engine and manual transmission. The GT was considered as the luxury specification in the SW20 line-up and had suede/leather door and seat trim in addition to G-Limited standard features. All Japanese market cars came equipped with electronic climate control featuring 2 stage air conditioning.
- European market trim levels:
1. Coupé with the NA 2.0L 3S-FE engine producing 138 hp (103 kW) (not available with T-bar roof). This model had no rear spoiler or front fog lights
2. GT-i Coupé with the NA 2.0L 3S-GE engine producing 158 PS (116 kW; 156 hp).
3. GT-i T-Bar with the NA 2.0L 3S-GE engine. Options included as standard were full leather seats/door cards and the premium, eight-speaker audio system.

There were no turbo models officially offered to the European market; however, many Japanese models were sold via the grey market.

- US market trim levels:
1. MR2 with a NA 2.2L 5S-FE engine producing 130 hp (97 kW) and offered with a four-speed A/T or five-speed M/T.
2. MR2 Turbo with a turbocharged 2.0L 3S-GTE engine producing 200 bhp (203 PS; 149 kW) at 6,000 rpm and 200 lb⋅ft (271 N⋅m) of torque at 3,200 rpm, offered only with a 5-speed M/T (offered solely with the T-bar roof after early 1993).

Differences between the naturally aspirated and turbocharged models include the "Turbo" emblem (US) on the rear trunk, 'TWIN CAM 16 TURBO' decal above the side intake (Japanese market), a fiberglass engine lid with raised vents, fog lights, and an added interior center storage compartment located between the two seats. All SW20 MR2s came with a staggered wheel setup, with wider wheels and tires in the rear than in the front.

Mechanical differences on the Turbo models include:

- 3S-GTE engine with associated air-to-air intercooler and different exhaust configuration;
- Stronger and heavier E153 gearbox with different ratios and stronger axles;
- Larger fuel pump and radiator.
- Models with 3S-GE and 3S-GTE engines had twin-piston front brake calipers. Models with the 5S-FE engine had only single-piston calipers.

The US market MR2 Turbo model was able to accelerate from 0–60 mph (0–97 km/h) in 6.1 seconds and finish the 1/4 mile in 14.7 seconds.

The Revision 1 Turbo SW20 can pull 0.89g at the skidpad, with later revisions averaging 0.90g – 0.94g.

Revision 2 cars were fitted with Yokohama A022 tires; coincidentally, the Honda NSX also uses a special variant of the A022.

Best Motoring, a Japanese automobile TV show, raced a stock Revision 5 GT-S Turbo versus other Japanese market contemporaries on the Tsukuba Circuit, with the MR2 winning the circuit race. In the rankings of personal bests, a Rev 2 GT-S was able to clock 1:08.00 at Tsukuba Circuit.

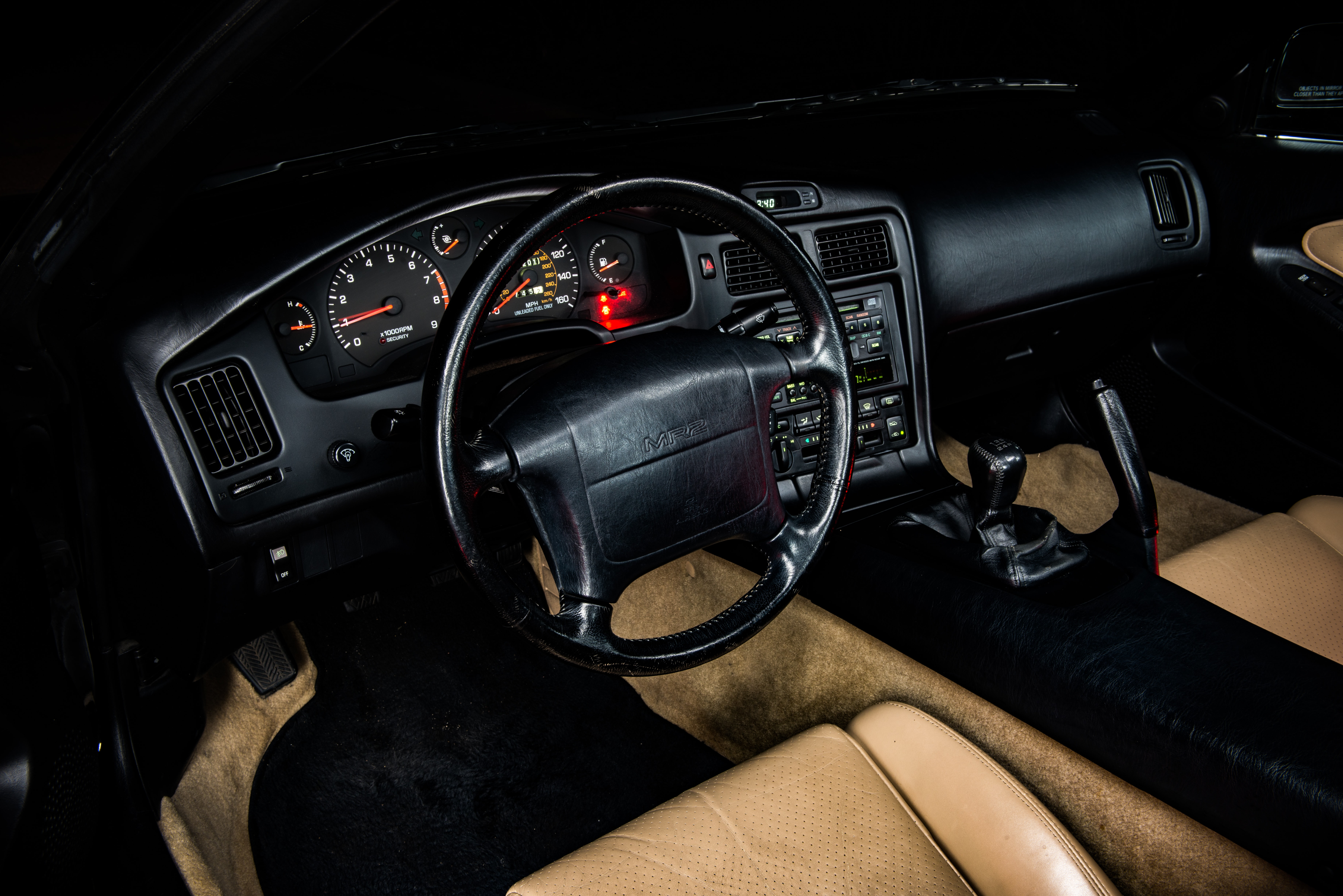
1993 Turbo Interior (US)

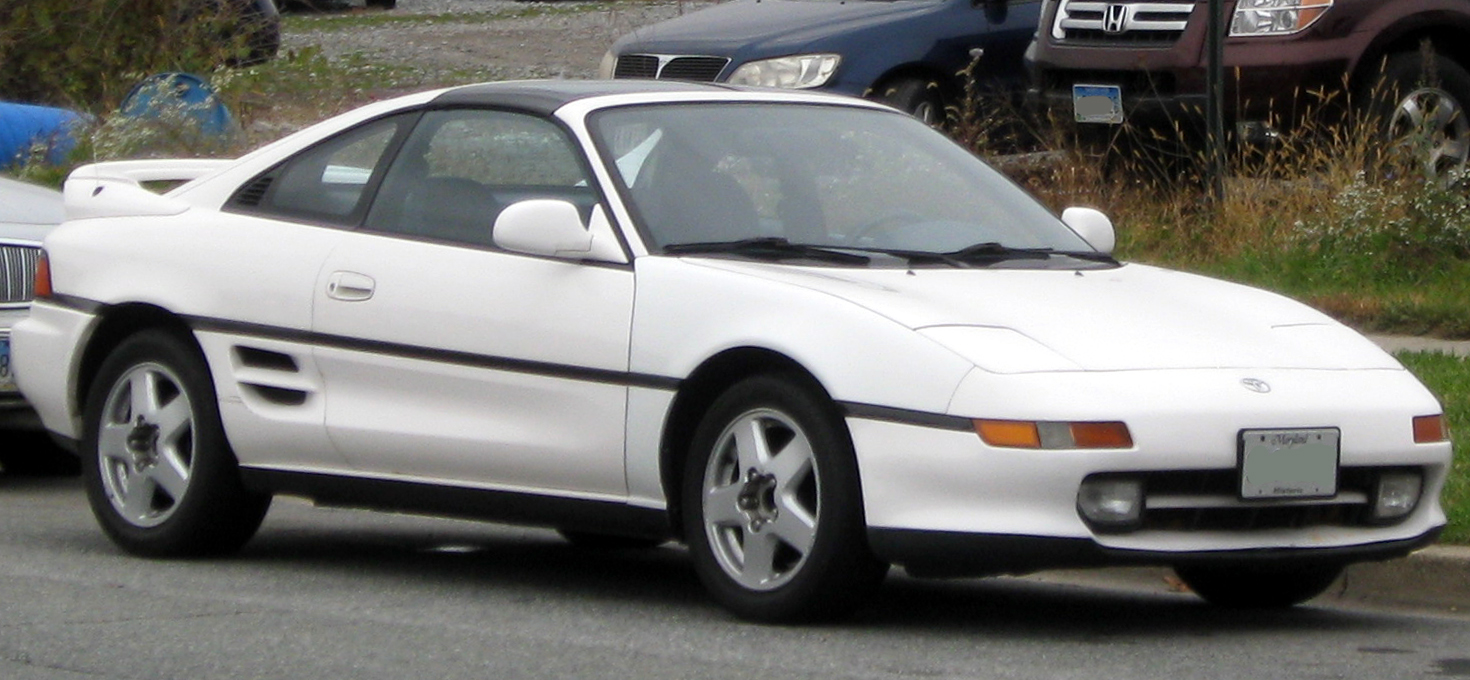
1991 MR2 SW20 (US)

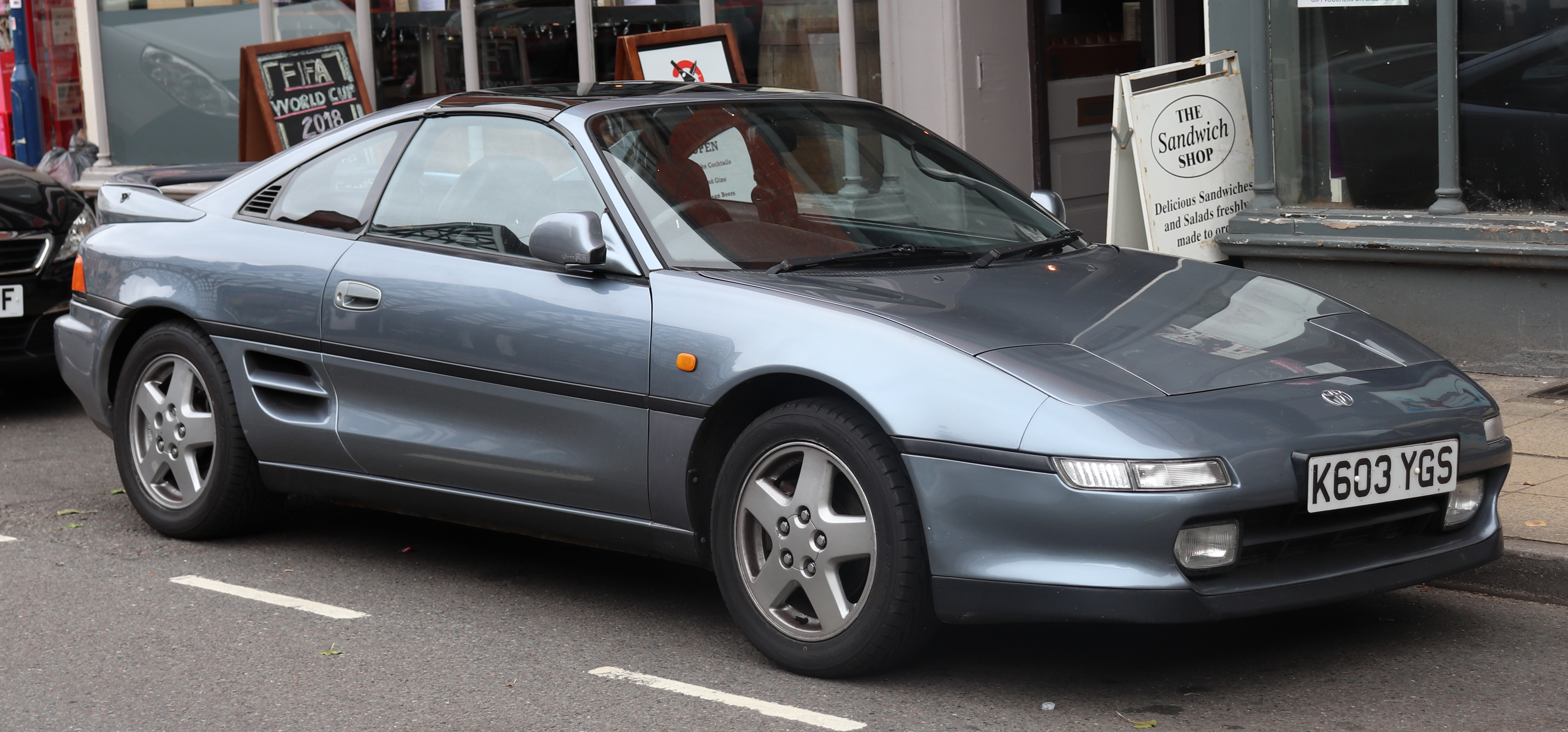
MR2 SW20 Revision 2

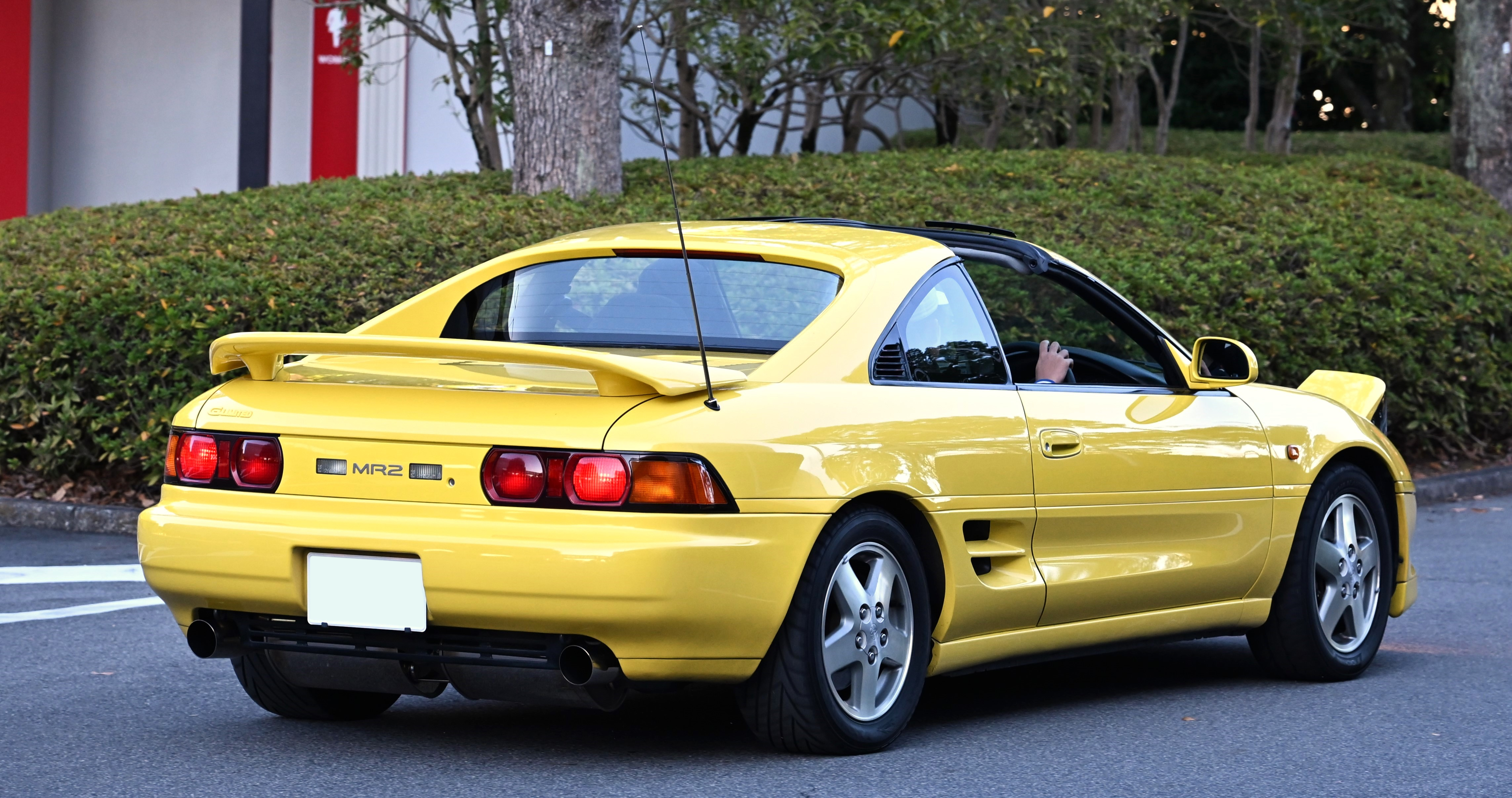
MR2 SW20 Revision 3

=== Revisions and model year changes ===
The second-generation MR2 underwent a variety of changes during its 10 years of production, grouped in four different periods:

1989 (Revision 1)

Introduction of the new generation.

January 1992 (Revision 2, MY 1993)

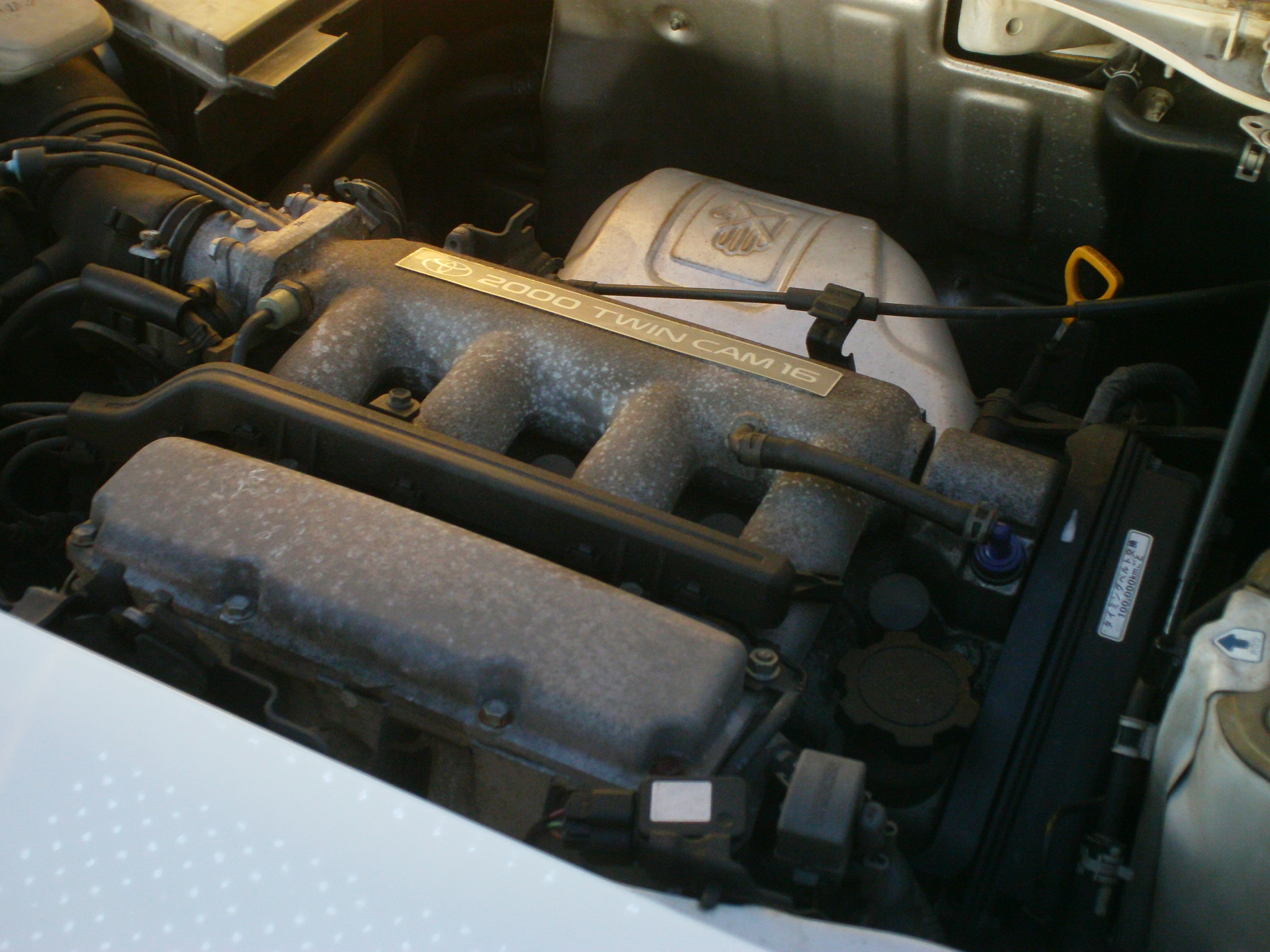
3S-GE equipped SW20

- Revised rear suspension with longer toe links
- Revised front suspension which removed castor angle adjustment
- Larger front lip
- 15-inch wheels and wider tires on all models (front: 195/55/15, rear: 225/50/15)
- Larger brakes (turbo only in US market, all cars for Japanese and European markets)
- Shorter shift lever and smaller knob
- Viscous LSD option (turbo only)
- Upgraded transmission synchronizers
- US turbo models now only sold with T-bar roof (except for a few sold in early 1993)
- Canadian sales cease after 1993
- EBFD and TC added as options on Japanese market models

November 1993 (Revision 3, MY 1994–1995)

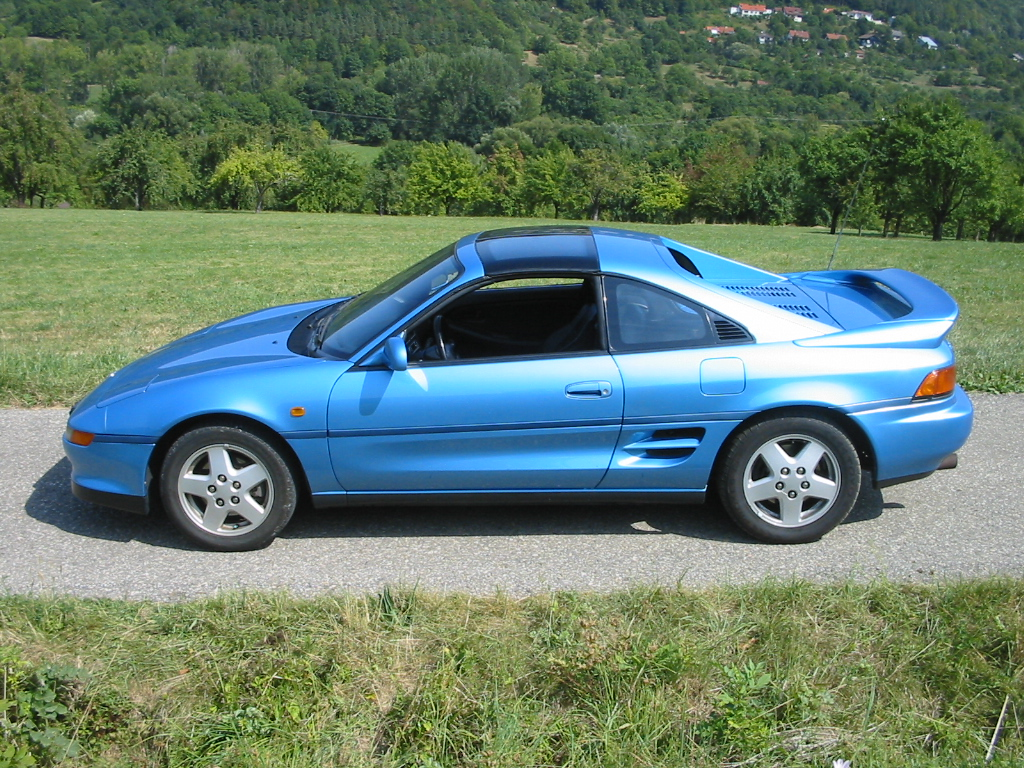
1992 SW20 T-Top. Note the 3-piece spoiler that integrates with the body.

- European & Japanese market 3S-GE now rated at 173 hp
- Japanese market 3S-GTE (Gen 3) now rated at 245 PS (180 kW; 242 hp)
- American market 5S-FE now rated at 135 hp (101 kW).
- American market Turbo models retained the Gen 2 3S-GTE.
- Round "Kouki" tail lights
- Prior 3-piece rear wing replaced with revised one-piece
- Color-coded center panel, front lip, and side skirts.
- Passenger airbag (not available for the Japanese market)
- Viscous LSD added as standard in Japanese market Turbo models
- Japanese market E153 gearbox revised with upgraded synchros
- Cruise control no longer an option on Japanese market models
- Upgrades made to ABS system, which now induced an acceleration sensor located behind the gear stick
- Upgrades to electronic power steering system (EHPS) to boost assist at low speeds and reduce assist at high speeds
- Strengthening pieces added to rear strut towers
- American sales cease in 1995; turbo models are not offered in California-emission states after 1994

June 1996 (Revision 4, MY 1996–1997)

- Fender mounted turn signals on all models
- 5-spoke alloy wheels featured diamond cut faces
- Passenger airbag added as an option in Japanese market
- Revisions to ABS system
- European 3S-GE down-rated to 168 hp due to the introduction of EGR.
- Unavailable in North America

Revision 5 : 1998–1999 Model (Introduced Nov-1997):

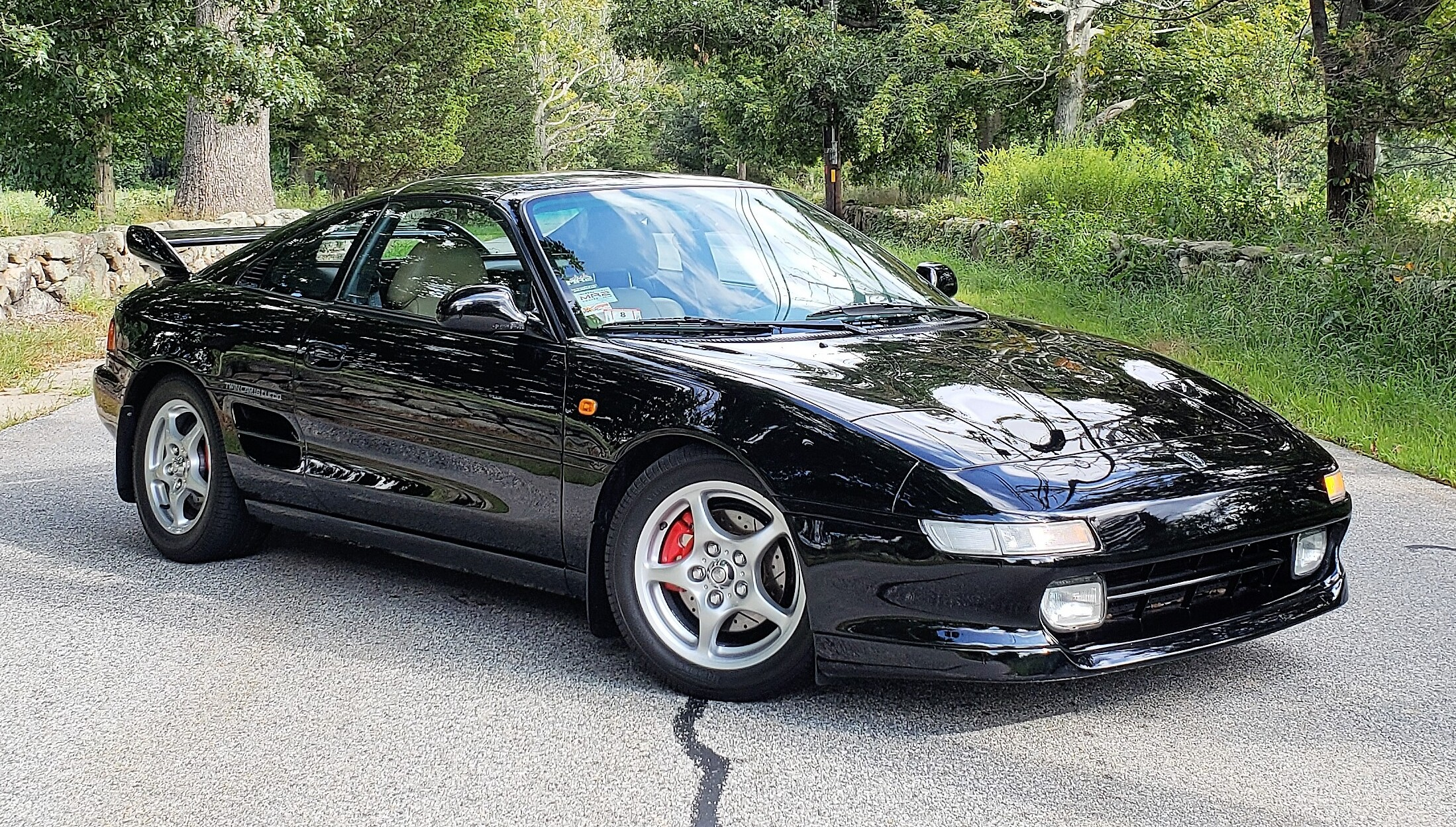
The 1998+ year model SW20s were equipped with a large, adjustable "combat" spoiler and had clear corner front lenses.

- Clear fender mounted turn signals
- New 15-inch wheels featuring narrower spokes
- Adjustable rear spoiler, revised from the earlier versions
- Red rings around gauges, red stitching on leather-wrapped shift knob (and on leather seats on turbos)
- Japan receives the new BEAMS 3S-GE rated at 200 PS (147 kW; 197 hp)

Changes to the suspension geometry, tire sizes and power steering in January 1992 (MY 1993) were made in response to journalist reports that the MR2 was prone to "snap-oversteer". As a counterpoint to the snap-oversteer phenomenon of the MR2, other journalists point out that most mid-engine and rear-engine sports and super cars exhibit similar behaviour, and that a change to the driver's response to oversteer is really the solution. In any car, braking shifts the weight forward, and acceleration to the rear. When drivers enter a corner with too much speed, and lift the throttle mid-corner, the weight transfers forward causing the rear tires to lose traction (called lift-off oversteer), which can result in a spin. When improper steering inputs were made attempting to correct this non-power-on oversteer, the rear of the MR2 would swing one way, then wildly (and quickly) the other—thus the term "snap" oversteer. Toyota elected to change the MR2 suspension and tires to reduce the likelihood that this would occur, though some drivers lament the change and claim that it "neutered" the sharp edge the MR2 was known for. Toyota claimed that the changes were made "for drivers whose reflexes were not those of Formula One drivers".

=== Special variants ===
==== TRD2000GT ====
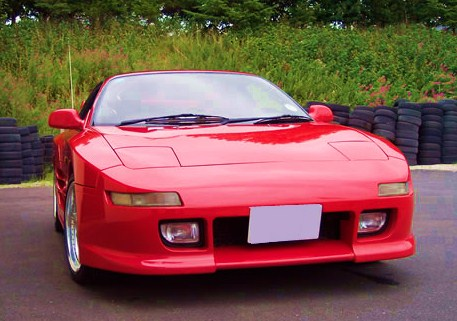
TRD2000GT, the bodykit gives a wider, more aggressive stance.

In 1998, Toyota Racing Development offered an official kit body conversion and tuning program for MR2 owners to transform their existing SW20 MR2 into a wide-body TRD2000GT replica car. This was to pay homage to the TRD2000GT wins in the GT-C Japanese racing series, since the TRD2000GT racing series cars were based on the SW20 floor pan. The TRD2000GT body kit widened the MR2 by a total of 100 mm (4 in). Prior to MR2s being fitted with the TRD2000GT body kit, TRD had its customers select which additional engine, wheel, and interior upgrades they wanted. For this reason, no two TRD2000GT MR2s are alike. It is rumored that at least one was built to produce up to 373 kW (500 bhp) whereas some others had few modifications to their engines.

In order to ensure exclusivity, a high price tag was charged and total of just 35 factory car conversions were completed by Toyota Technocraft Ltd. Each official Technocraft-converted car was made using lightweight fiberglass components (front fenders, trunk lid extension, rear quarter panels, gas door, front and rear bumpers, 3-piece wing) and re-classified as completely new cars (with their own specially numbered TRD VIN plate riveted to the body to indicate their authenticity and rarity).

The Toyota Technocraft Ltd. TRD2000GT had a 60 mm (2.4 in) wider front and rear track (due to the addition of wider wheels and tires). Virtually every car converted also had other TRD parts fitted too, including extensive changes to the engine. Most cars left the factory making more power due to TRD bolt-ons, some cars even left the factory boasting up to 500 PS (368 kW; 493 hp) and less than 1,100 kg (2,425 lb). While TRD Japan only offered a small number of kits with all body parts required for third-party conversion, Toyota Technocraft Ltd. offered complete car conversions.

Apart from the cars listed on the TRD2000GT register it is unknown how many original Toyota Technocraft Ltd. cars still exist today, but it is rumored that approximately 10 conversion kits were imported from TRD Japan into the US for conversions. Very little is known about these cars outside Japan.

==== TOM'S T020 ====
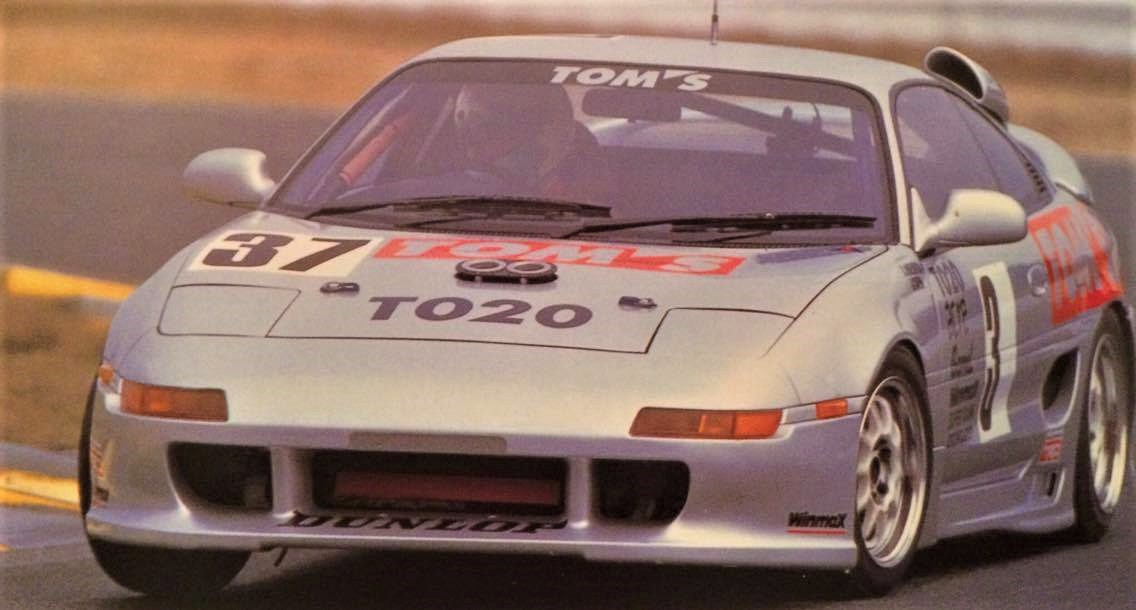
TOM'S T020 complete car

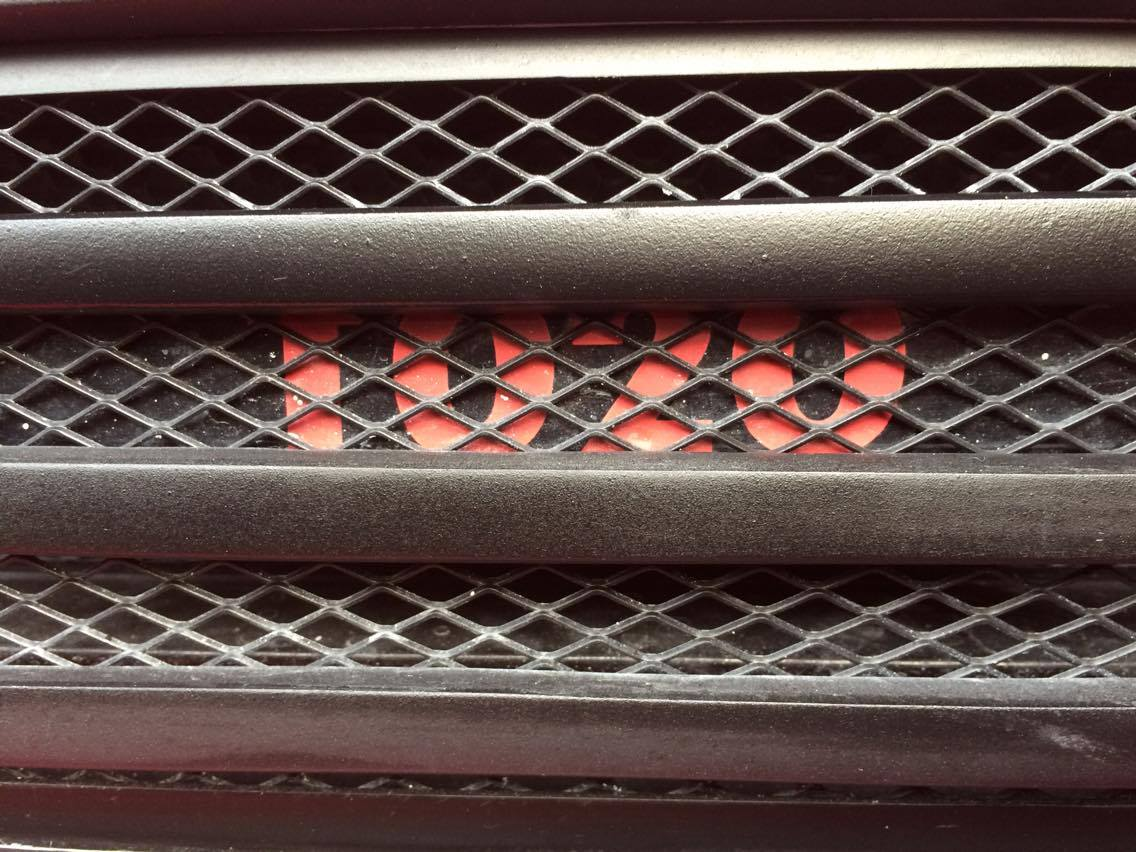
TOM'S T020 badge

Apart from Toyota Racing Development, TOM'S also released official body kits and a variety of tuning parts for the MR2. The "T020" as it was called, was powered by a naturally aspirated 2.2L stroked 3S-GE that produced 175 kW (235 bhp) at 6,800 rpm, this was due to more aggressive "F3" cams, a stroker kit, better intake flow with the aid of the "TOM'S Hyper Induction Carbon" intake kit, and an upgraded exhaust system labeled the "TOM'S Barrel", a lightened flywheel was also equipped to help the engine rev easier. The T020 also featured a more race-oriented suspension/chassis set up via camber kits, upgraded tie-rods, strut bars, roll center adjusters, stiffer springs, race shock absorbers, and sports brake pads. These modifications lowered the vehicle's center of gravity for increased agility and stability while cornering. The engine modifications enabled the T020 to accelerate from 0–60 mph (0–97 km/h) in 4.9 seconds. A sportier look was given to the vehicle as well through engine scoops, side skirts, a Ferrari 348-esque rear light grille, forged wheels, revised bumper designs, and a larger rear spoiler.

While the T020 normally featured natural aspiration, TOM'S also produced equipment for turbocharged models — e.g. wastegates, boost controllers, air filters, a 3S-GTE version of their "TOM'S Barrel" exhaust system, and "T.E.C. II" Engine Control Units. TOM'S still keeps a T020 part list on their website, and there are still T020 part catalogues in circulation between buyers to this day, albeit second-hand.

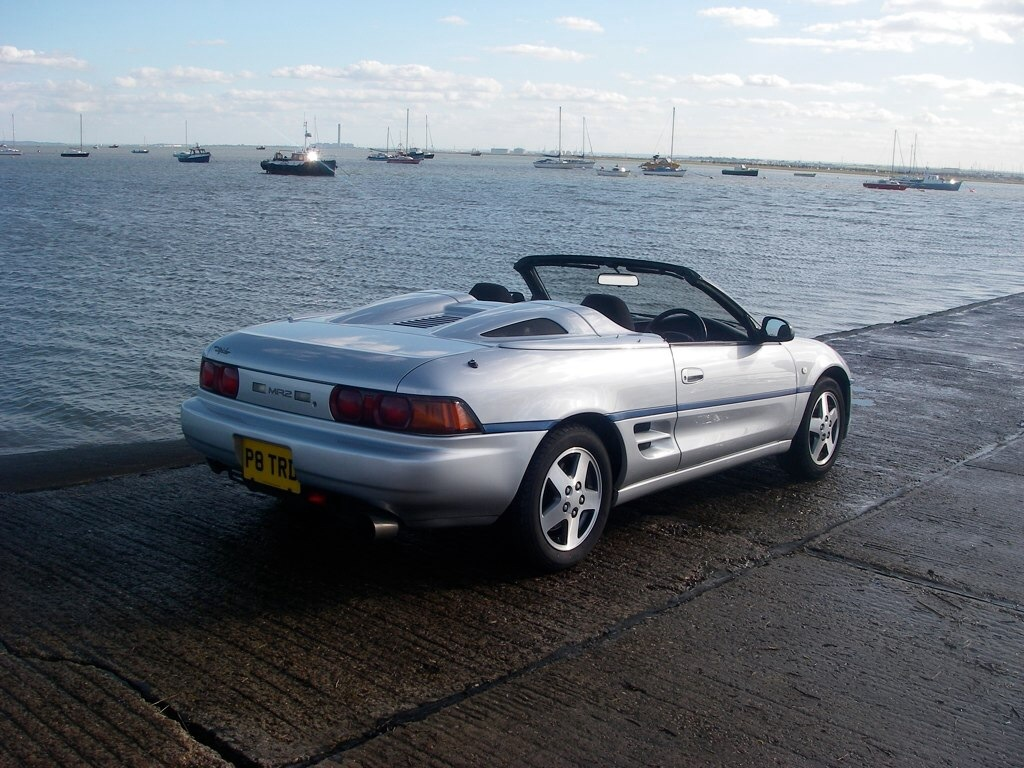
An MR Spider with the unique engine lid.

==== SW20 Spider ====
Between 1996 and 1999, Toyota TechnoCraft (TTC) produced 88 or 91 SW20 MR2 Spider convertible conversions. These cars featured a retractable cloth soft top roof and exclusive wingless trunk and engine lids. Most Spiders had automatic transmissions, naturally aspirated engines, and Lucerne Silver paint with blue side mouldings and black and blue accented cloth seats. The Toyota name and logo were not applied to these cars due to concerns about roof leaks.

=== Aftermarket ===
During its production, the SW20 enjoyed a myriad of tuning parts from Japanese tuners such as HKS, Blitz, Phoenix Power, etc. While some companies only offered aesthetic modifications for the SW20, others such as Phoenix Power offered modifications such as a tuned ECU, long block modifications, and a trunk-mounted intercooler combined with a T04R turbocharger. The Phoenix Power MR2 also featured a large rear wing reminiscent of the 911 (993) GT2 for increased downforce at high speeds, and a reworked suspension set up with Öhlins equipment. Japanese tuner Border Racing, made available several parts as well, consisting mostly of parts that improved the car's suspension geometry, namely roll-center adapters, extended tie rods, etc., though they have also produced intercooler kits for the car and several interior pieces. AP Racing at a time also produced a brake kit as well for the MR2, but this has been discontinued. Performance parts manufacturer JUN offered engine upgrades for the MR2's 3S-GTE engine which came in the form of stroker kits, which were co-developed with Cosworth, and also offered lightened flywheels, cam gears, and camshafts.

The 2GR-FE V6, used in various Toyota and Lexus models, is a popular engine swap candidate for the MR2, especially the SW20 generation.

=== Reception ===
The SW20 garnered generally favorable reviews during its production life, with various sources complimenting the styling, power, and responsive handling. Car and Driver noted the revised SW20's braking capabilities to be superb, stating that 70 mph to standstill could be done in 157 feet, rivaling that of the Honda NSX. Former Top Gear host and racing driver Tiff Needell commended the SW20's handling having said that it "encourages you to drive with enthusiasm" in a review back in 1990. He did note however, that the sudden transition from understeer to oversteer may be startling for some people.

The car is known for a phenomenon known as "snap-oversteer". This comes from numerous instances where individuals crash their SW20s either on or off the race track, typically due to inexperience with a mid-ship platform, as MR layouts handle differently in comparison to the more common FF or FR layouts. Even in its revised state from January 1992, the SW20 still has a large enough following to be labeled as a very challenging car to push to its limits, with some labeling it as "the most dangerous car that you can buy". Such a label may be true as MR2s are one of the more affordable automobiles with an MR platform.

=== Motorsport (W20) ===
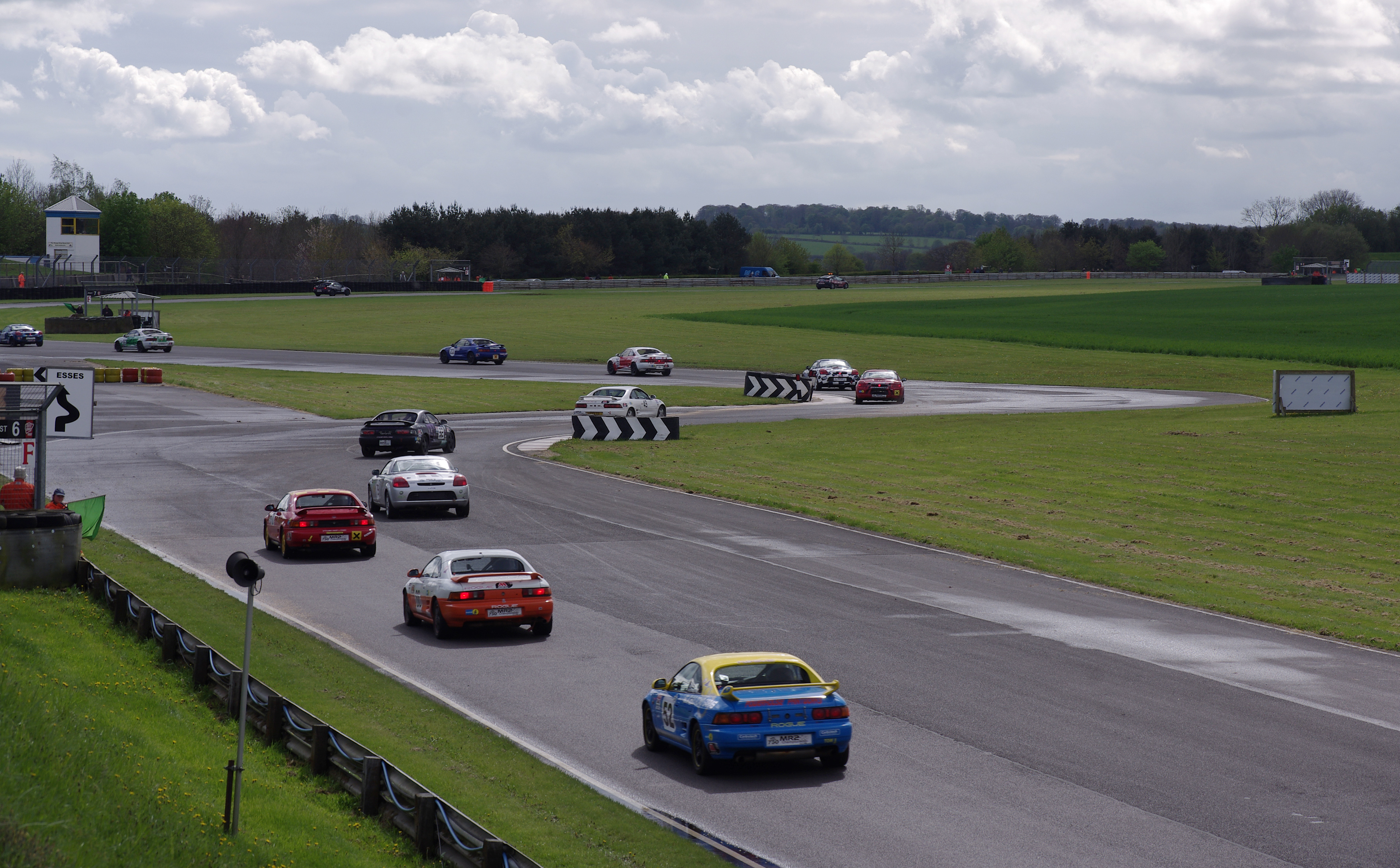
The MR2 Championship, a series in the UK that makes use of both the SW20 and ZZW30 models. Both cars are kept relatively stock except for the addition of safety equipment.

Early in the 1990s, the SW20 enjoyed considerable motorsport success throughout the world. Several teams fielded the MR2 in the Swiss Touring Car Championship, as well as in the South-East Asian Supercar Championship, with much success. The chassis was also used for a time during the mid 90s in the Fuji Freshman Series in Japan in which the SW20 succeeded the earlier AE86 chassis. As of 2022, both the SW20 and ZZW30 chassis are used in 750 Motor Club's MR2 Championship in the UK which started in the early 2000s.

==== SARD MC8-R ====
SARD (Sigma Advanced Research Development) built a heavily modified and lengthened version of the SW20 for GT racing called the SARD MC8-R. It used a heavily modified MR2 frontal chassis with a custom rear chassis made to fit a twin-turbo version of the 4.0-liter 1UZ-FE V8 producing 600 bhp (447 kW). This is the first car which only used the frontal chassis of a production car and was effectively a purpose-built semi-sports-prototype that successfully got GT1 homologation. The overall construction method of this car (a heavily modified production car frontal chassis with race-built rear chassis combined into a style of semi-prototype) inspired Porsche to make 911 GT1 homologation specials which dominates the GT1, and foreshadowed the cancellation of GT1.

==== Japanese Grand Touring Championship (now Super GT) ====
With JGTC being the highest form of sports car racing in Japan, many manufacturers and private teams alike spent countless hours of research and development into perfecting their respective chassis. Toyota would enter their premier production cars, namely the Celica, MR2, and Supra. Unlike the experimental MC8-R, the MR2 JGTC shared more qualities chassis wise to the road-going production car, though it had a lower ride height than the standard SW20s, was wider, featured advanced aerodynamics and Brembo racing brakes. While it kept the MacPherson suspension setup from the road car, these components too were heavily modified (strut towers were more inward). The standard E153 5-speed transmission was swapped out for a race sequential transmission, which was mated to a race-spec version of the 3S-GTE engine. With the car's interior gutted, the intercooler was placed in the forward section of the vehicle with pipes travelling to and fro inside the cabin, as opposed to in the engine bay as a "side-mount" in production MR2s. Having won back to back in the years 1998 to 1999 against arguably more sophisticated race cars such as the BMW M3, Porsche 911, Ferrari F355, Toyota has proven that the SW20 chassis was competitive enough for top level sports car racing.

1998

- Team Taisan Jr. with Tsuchiya campaigned a MR2 #25 powered by the factory 3S-GTE powerplant in the 1998 JGTC season. Keiichi Suzuki and Shingo Tachi drove an amazing five GT300 victories out of six races (as the Fuji Speedway race was cancelled due to inclement weather and several accidents), winning the teams' and drivers' championship for GT300 accumulating a total of 106 points. Their #25 MR2 also participated and won the "All-Star race" at the end of the year.

1999

- For following year, Team Taisan Jr. moved to a Porsche chassis in GT300, while MOMOCORSE A'PEX Racing Team with Tsuchiya campaigned a crimson MR2 and won both teams' and drivers' championships. Morio Nitta and Shinichi Takagi drove to one victory, two 2nd places, and one third place to secure the teams' championship, with Nitta winning the drivers' championship by just one point over the Nismo Silvia that was driven by Takeshi Tsuchiya and Yuji Ide. Momocorse Racing would move to the MR-S chassis for the 2000 season, marking the end of the SW20's participation in JGTC.

==== Land speed record ====
In 1992, Dennis Aase, a member of Toyota's American factory team, became the first driver to achieve over 320 km/h (200 mph) in the cars class as he took his SW20 to a 339.686 km/h (211.071 mph) average. The car posted 326.697 and 352.068 km/h (203 and 218.765 mph) on the two opposing runs required for the record.

The car, which previously saw action at the Firestone Firehawk Endurance Championship by P. J. Jones, ran with a boost of 16 psi (1.1 bar) with changes to the intake and exhaust systems and the cam timing, output a maximum of 494 PS; 363 kW (487 hp). The car ran with its stock body apart minus wing mirrors and wiper blades. His attempt at improving his record the following year was thwarted by poor weather.

As of July 2015, the G/BGT record (Class G, Blown Grand Touring Sports or 2 Liter production turbo-charged GT) still stands.

== Third generation (W30; 1999–2007) ==
W30
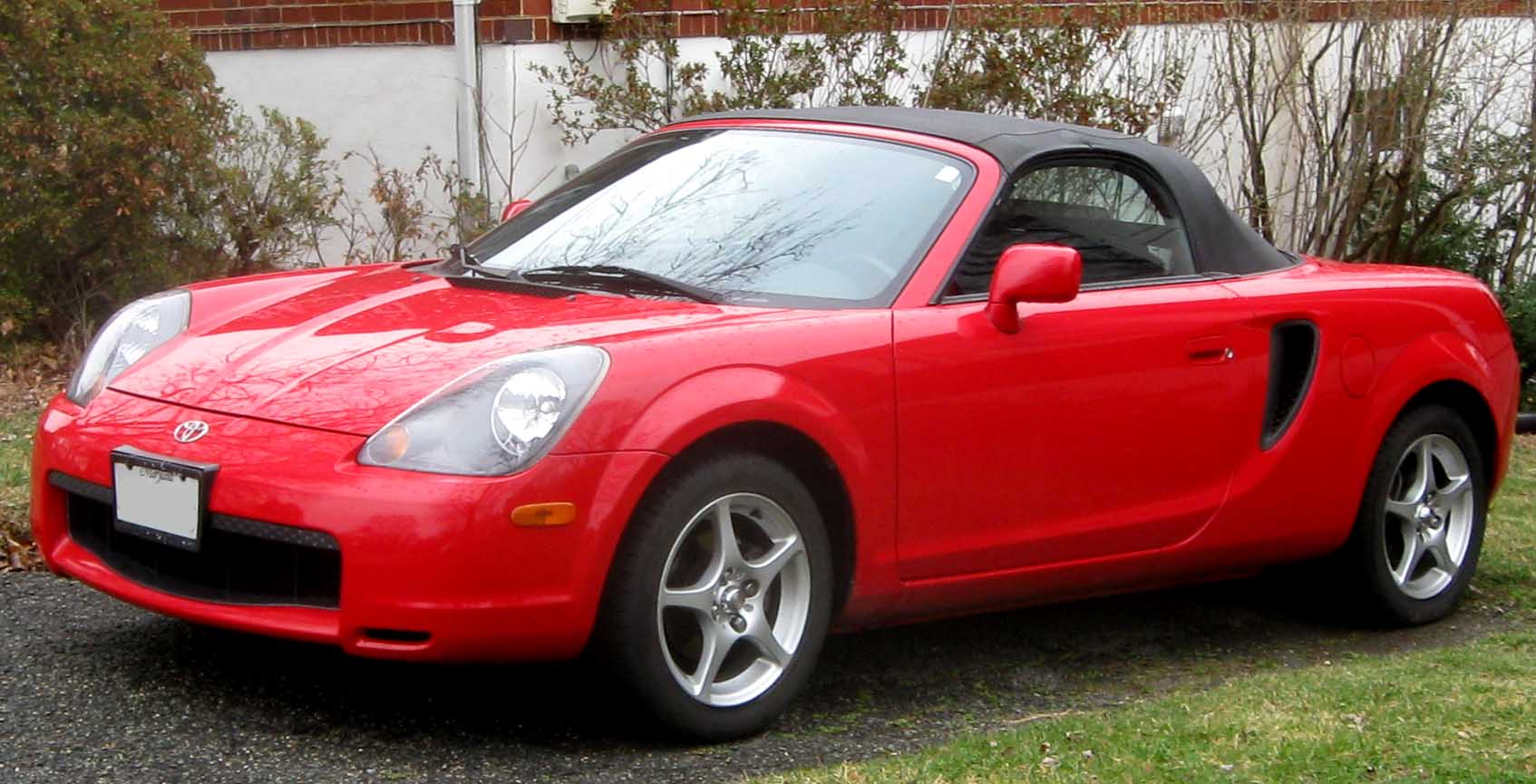

Overview
- Also called: Toyota MR-S (Japan); Toyota MR2 Spyder (United States, Australia); Toyota MR2 Roadster (Europe, except France and Belgium); Toyota MR Roadster (France and Belgium)
- Production: October 1999 – July 2007
- Model years: 2000–2005 (North America)
- Designer: Naoki Nagatsu

Body and chassis
- Body style: 2-door convertible

Powertrain
- Engine: 1.8 L (1,794 cc) 1ZZ-FE VVT-i I4 (ZZW30)
- Power output: 138 bhp (140 PS; 103 kW) and 126 lb⋅ft (171 N⋅m) of torque
- Transmission: 5-speed manual; 6-speed manual (Europe); 5-speed SMT; 6-speed SMT

Dimensions
- Wheelbase: 2,451 mm (96.5 in)
- Length: 3,886 mm (153 in)
- Width: 1,694 mm (66.7 in)
- Height: 1,240 mm (48.8 in)
- Curb weight: 996 kg (2,195 lb)

The third-generation MR2 was marketed as the Toyota MR-S in Japan, Toyota MR2 Spyder in the US and Australia, and the Toyota MR2 Roadster in Europe, except for France and Belgium, where it was marketed as the Toyota MR Roadster.

Also known as the Midship Runabout-Sports, the newest MR2 took a different approach than its predecessor, most obviously becoming a convertible and receiving the 'Spyder' marketing nomenclature.

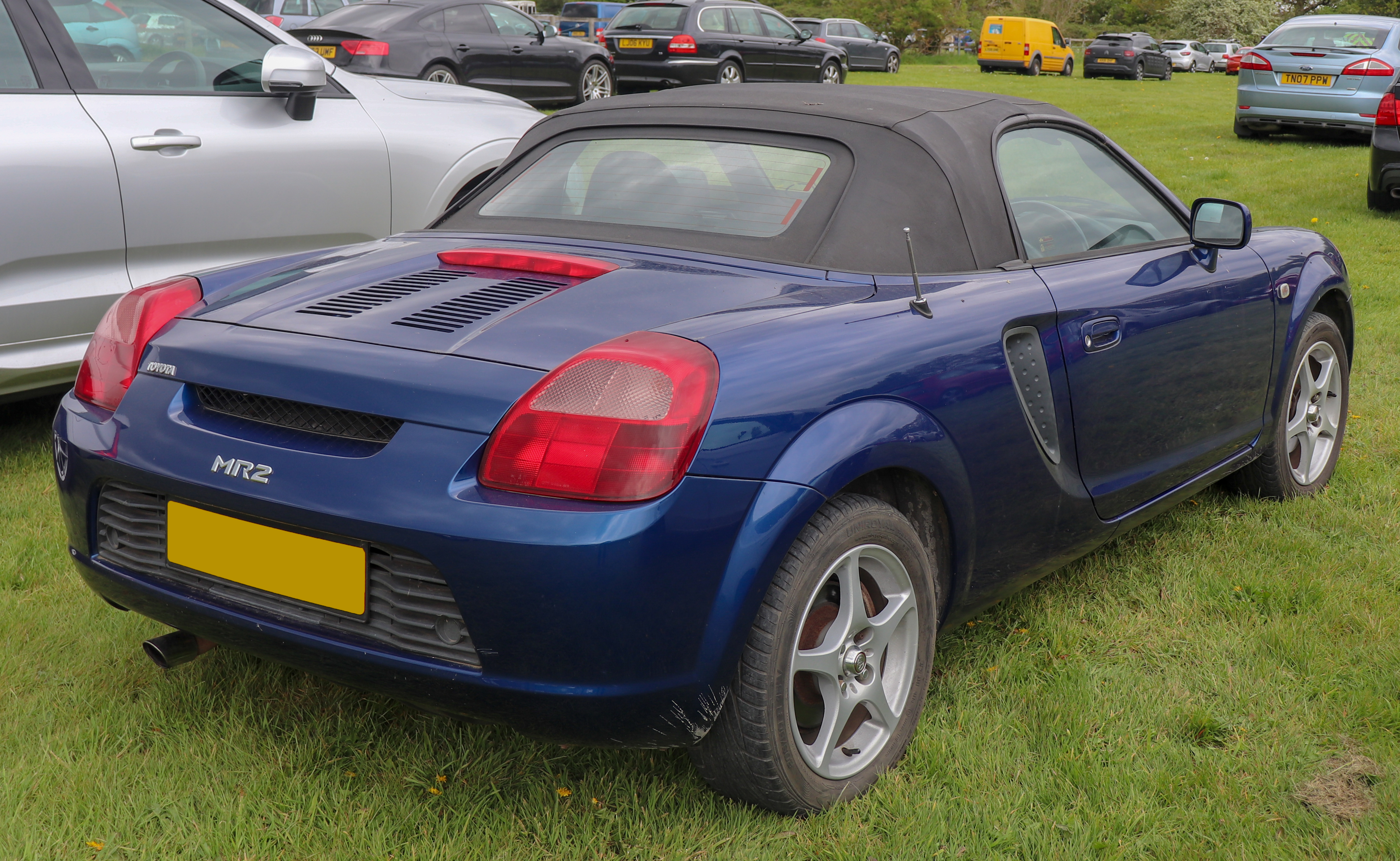
Rear

The first prototype of the MR-S appeared in 1997 at the Tokyo Motor Show. The MR2 Spyder chief engineer Harunori Shiratori said, "First, we wanted true driver enjoyment, blending good movement, low inertia, and lightweight. Then, a long wheelbase to achieve high stability and fresh new styling; a mid-engine design to create excellent handling and steering without the weight of the engine upfront; a body structure as simple as possible to allow for easy customizing, and low cost to the consumer."

The only engine available for the ZZW30 was the all-aluminum alloy 1ZZ-FE, a 1.8 L (1,794 cc) straight-four engine. Like its predecessors, it used DOHC and 4 valves per cylinder. The intake camshaft timing was adjustable via the VVT-i system, which was introduced earlier on the 1998 MR2 in some markets. Unlike its predecessors, however, the engine was placed onto the car the other way round, with the exhaust manifold towards the rear of the car instead of towards the front. The maximum power of 138 bhp (140 PS; 103 kW) at 6,400 rpm and 126 lb⋅ft (171 N⋅m) of torque at 4,400 rpm was a drop from the previous generation, but thanks to the lightness of the car, it could accelerate from 0 to 100 km/h (62 mph) in 6.8 to 8.7 seconds depending on the transmission option, with the SMT being unable to launch and shift as quickly as the conventional manual transmission. Curb weight is 996 kg (2,195 lb) for manual transmission models.

In addition to the 5-speed manual transmission, a 6-speed manual and 5-speed SMT were made available starting in 2002. A form of automated manual transmission, the SMT has no conventional H-pattern shift lever nor clutch pedal. The driver shifts gears by tapping the shift lever forward or backward or by pressing steering-wheel-mounted buttons. Clutch engagement is automated, and the system modulates the throttle on downshifts, matching engine speed to transmission speed seamlessly. The system prioritizes clutch life over shift speed, hence shifts and launches are slower and gentler than those a human driver can perform using a conventional manual transmission, hindering acceleration somewhat. Unlike similar systems offered in contemporary sports cars, the SMT lacks a fully automated mode emulating an automatic transmission. The SMT automatically shifts to second (in the 6-speed) and then first gear when stopping (5-speed only shifts automatically down to 1st). The SMT was a standard feature in the Australian market; however, air conditioning was optional. Torsen LSD was also standard on Australian delivered cars. After 2003, a 6-speed SMT was an option. Cruise control was never offered with the manual transmission but was standard for SMT-equipped cars (cruise control was not standard in Australia). In top gear at 60 mph (97 km/h) the SMT spins at 2,780 rpm rather than 3,000 rpm for the 5-speed manual at the same speed – making it slightly quieter and giving better economy, even with the extra weight. In Australia, SMT-equipped cars had the same 4.3 short-ratio final-drive as the manual versions in other markets.

The MR2 Spyder featured a heated glass rear window. A hardtop was also available from Toyota in Japan and Europe. Cargo volume was extremely limited, with only 11 L (0.4 cu ft) of usable space under the front trunk and an additional 42 L (1.5 cu ft) in an area behind the seats.

=== Yearly changes ===
October 1999

The MR-S was introduced in October 1999 to the Japanese market in three trim levels: the "B", the "Standard", and the "S". The "S" trim level included power windows, locks, mirrors, AM/FM/CD radio, cloth seats, tilt steering wheel, and alloy wheels. In Japan, this model is exclusive to Netz dealership.

In March 2000, for the US 2001 model year, the car was introduced into the United States and Europe as a "monospec" level, which included the same features as Japan's "S" trim level. In October 2000 the car was introduced in Australia as a 5-speed SMT only.

2001

In 2001, for the US 2002 model year:

- 5-speed SMT introduced in the US.

2002 Facelift

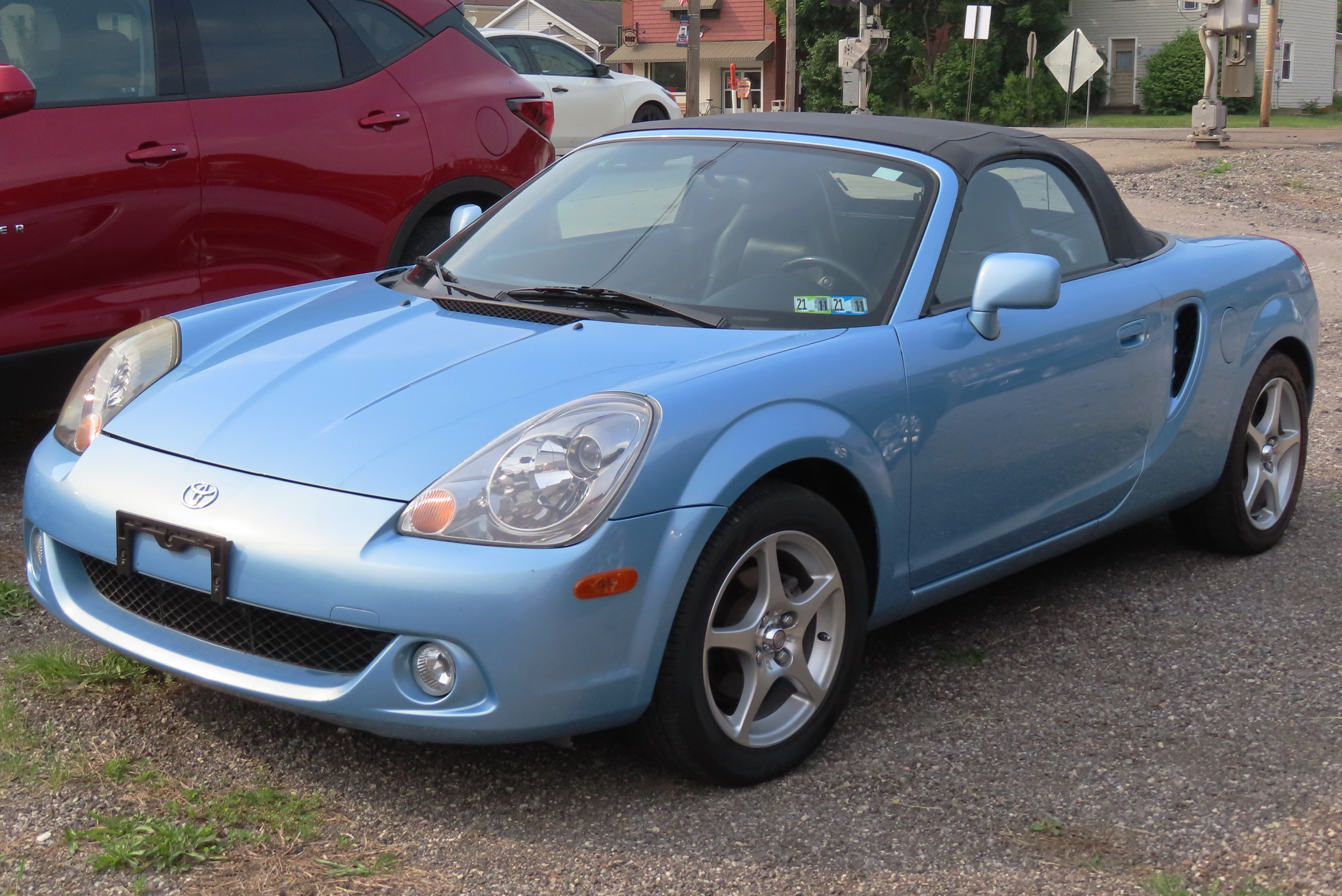

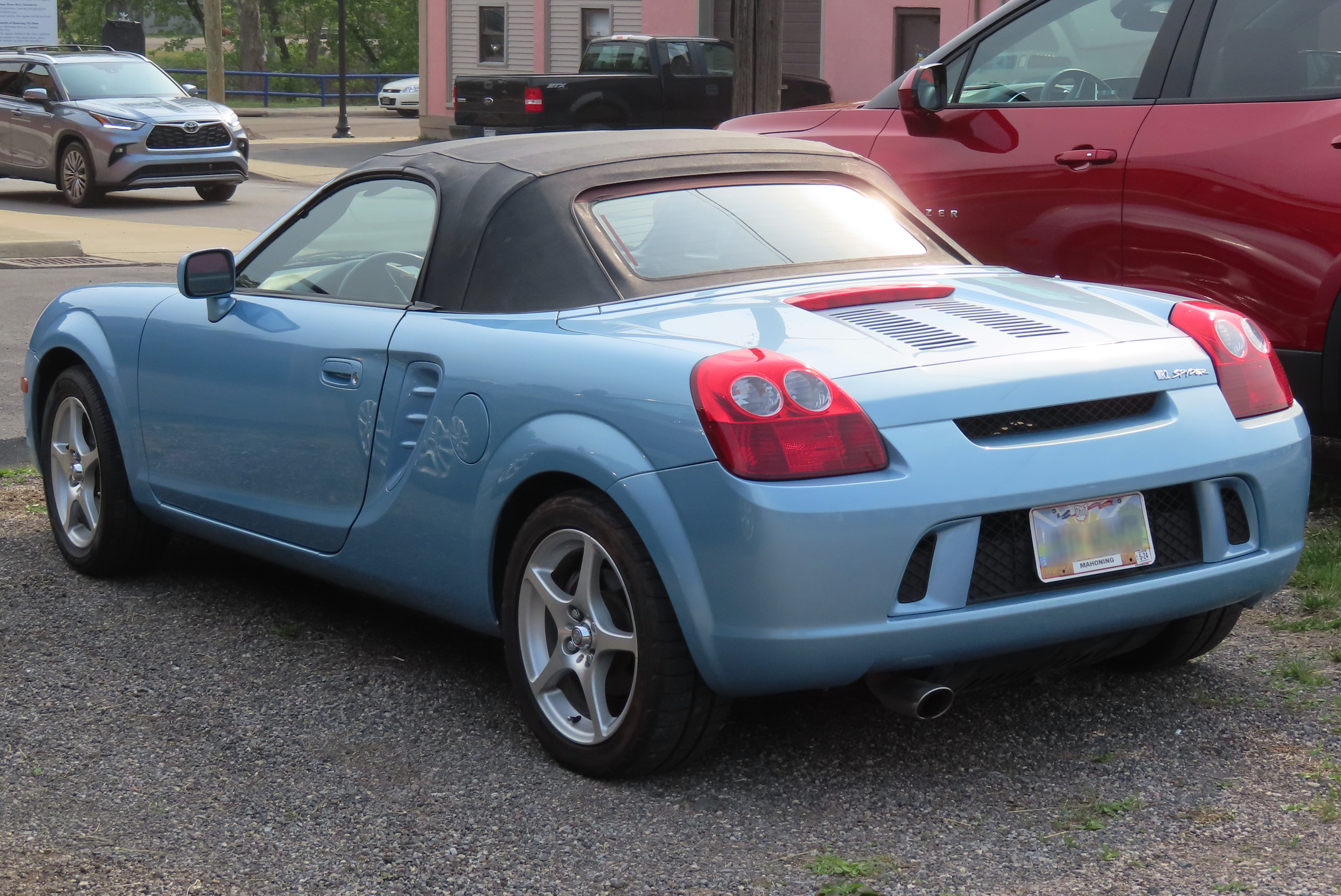
2002 Facelift

In August 2002, for the US 2003 model year, the MR2 received a major facelift for 2003 model year. This facelift includes: redesigned front fascia and taillights, fog lights added, new 16-inch wheels with wider tires, new seats, slight changes to the gauge cluster and interior, transmission upgraded to 6-speed manual, and new springs, dampers, and a new underbody brace.

2003

In 2003, for the US 2004 model year:

- Torsen (helical) limited-slip differential available as an option (C65-01B transmission)
- Strengthened unibody for crash intrusion protection (resulting in 10 kg (22 lb) greater curb weight)
- Ride height increased approximately 1 inch in all markets

2004

In 2004, for the US 2005 model year:

- 6-disc in-dash CD player standard
- Last year of sales in North America

2006

In 2006, for the 2007 model year:

- Last year of sales
- Special "V-Edition" limited run of 1000 units and sold only in Japan.
- Special "TF300" editions sold only in the United Kingdom.
- Some "Final Edition" models came with a burgundy soft top.

=== Performance and handling ===
The feedback for the new model was somewhat mixed. Some liked its new design, while fans of the SW20 would've liked it to continue along the path of the previous model. The handling, however, was praised. For example, Tiff Needell, a professional race driver and the former host of the BBC television series Top Gear, praised the handling of the ZZW30. As some complained of the relative lack of power, some owners have opted to switch out the 1ZZ-FE engine in exchange for the 141 kW; 189 bhp; 192 PS 2ZZ-GE.

=== Productions numbers ===
MR2 Spyder production numbers (North American sales figures only).

- 2000: 7,233
- 2001: 6,750
- 2002: 5,109
- 2003: 3,249
- 2004: 2,800
- 2005: 780
- Total: 27,941

=== The end of the Spyder ===
In July 2004, Toyota announced that sales of the MR2 (as well as the Celica) would be discontinued in the US at the end of the 2005 model year because of lower sales numbers. The ZZW30 sold 7,233 units in its debut year, falling to just 901 for the 2005 model, for a total of 27,941 through its six years of production in the US. The 2005 model year was the last year of the MR2 in the US. While the MR2 Spyder was not sold after 2005 in the US, it still was offered in Japan, Mexico, and Europe until production of the car ceased permanently in July 2007.

=== Special variants ===
==== Modellista Caserta ====
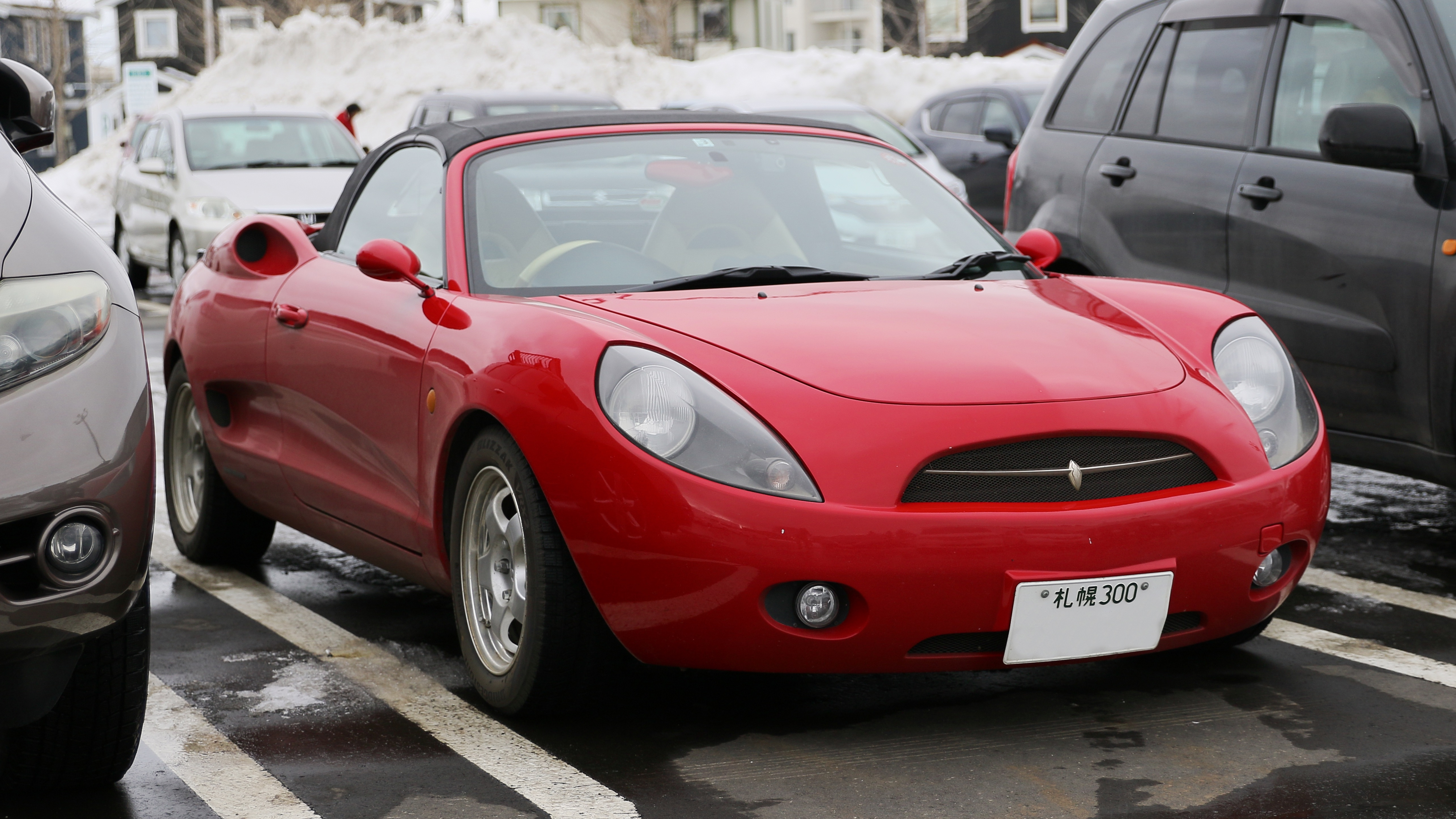
MR-S Caserta

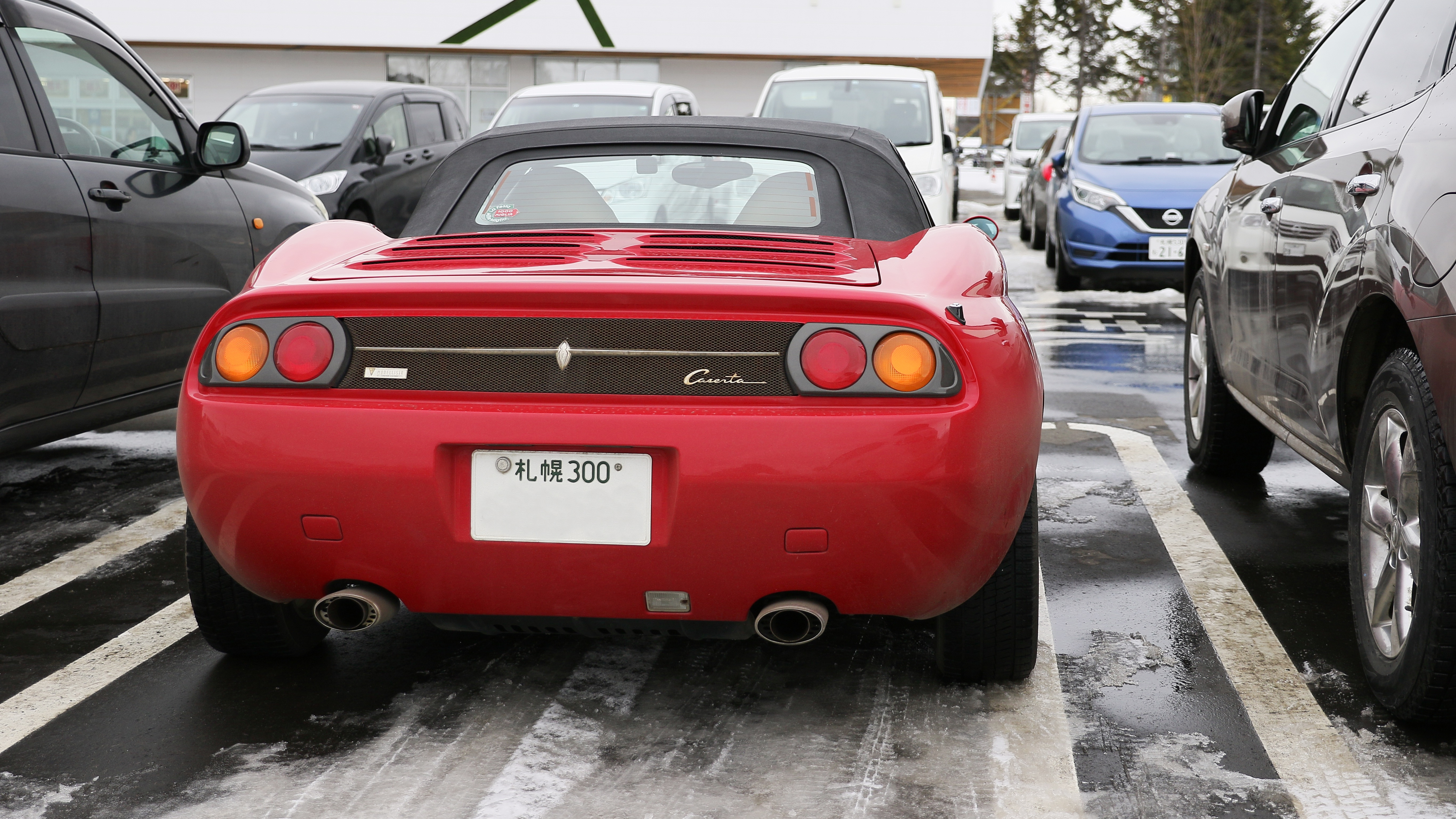
Rear view

Toyota Modellista International developed a rebodied version of the MR-S and showed it at the January 2000 Tokyo Auto Salon, a show for customized cars. As the design met with a positive response, it was decided to put it into production and 150 examples were projected. The Caserta is more rounded than the MR-S it is based on, featuring a Ferrari 360-inspired air intake atop the rear fenders. The Caserta used the MR-S' drivetrain without modifications, but the car did sit 20 mm (0.8 in) lower than the original.

==== VM180 Zagato ====
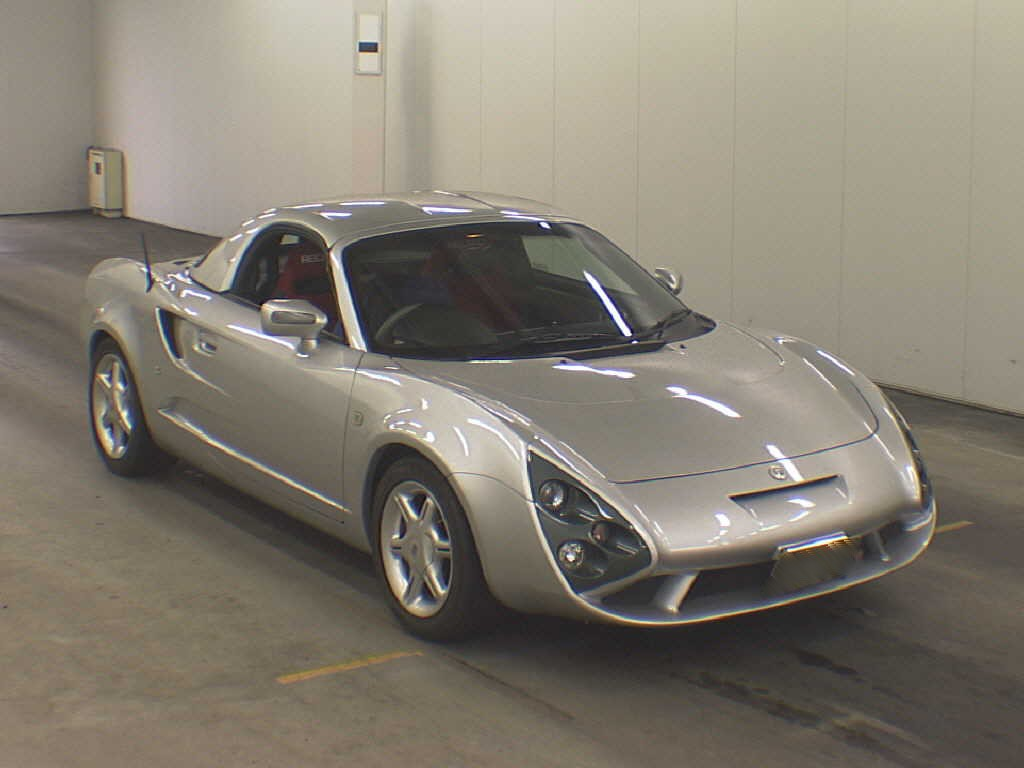
Toyota VM180 Zagato (non-standard wheels)

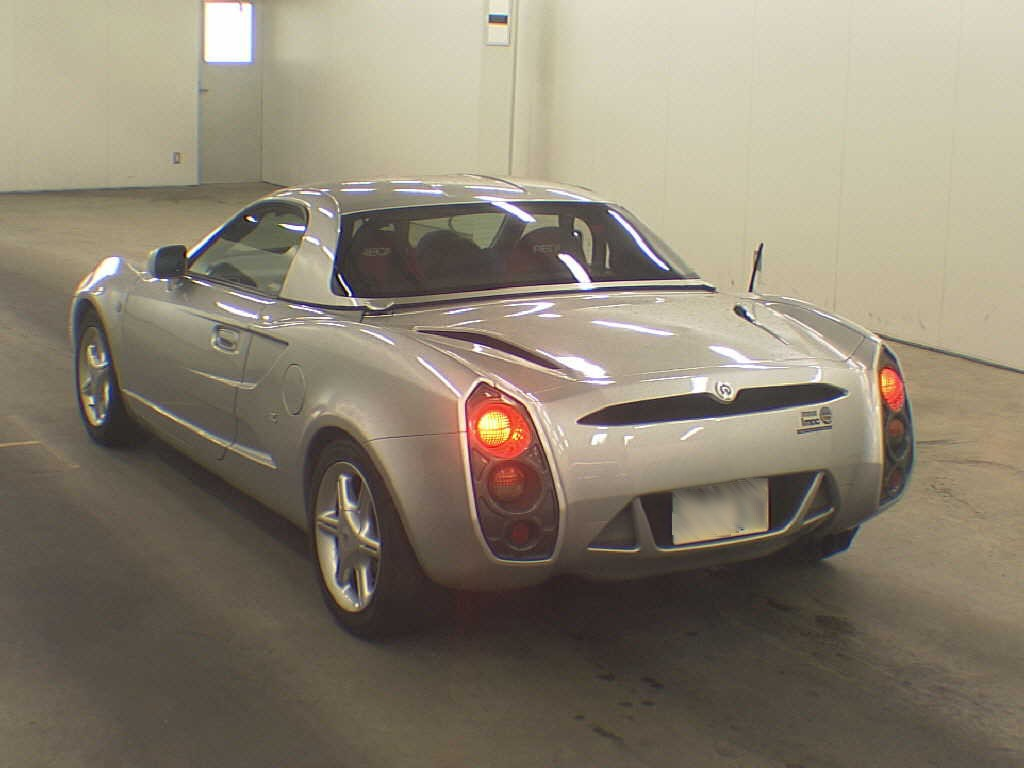

The Toyota VM180 Zagato was designed by Zagato, based on the MR-S, and built by Toyota Modellista International for sale in Japan only through the Toyota Vista dealer network. It was first shown on 10 January 2001 in Tokyo and then at the February 2001 Geneva Motor Show. The body panels are all new, except for the A-pillar, glass, and door mirrors, and are made of fiberglass reinforced plastic, bolted and bonded to the MR-S chassis. For the doors, an FRP panel was fitted over top of the original door panels, as can be seen by the recess around the door handles. The engine was tuned to produce 116 kW; 157 PS (155 bhp) at 6400 rpm, and the car was offered with a choice of a 5-speed manual or 5-speed SMT transmission. The VM180 was slightly longer and wider than a standard MR-S, as well as reportedly 50 kg (110 lb) heavier. The original base price was more than double that of a standard MR-S. Sources say that between 100-200 examples were built.

==== V-Edition ====
As a farewell to the MR2, Toyota produced 1000 limited-production V-Edition cars for Japan and the UK. They featured different color wheels, titanium interior accents, minor body changes, a helical limited-slip differential, and different steering wheel trim.

==== TF300 ====
Also for the 2007 model year, the United Kingdom received 300 models in a special numbered TF300 series. A special 136 kW (182 bhp) turbocharged variant called the TTE Turbo (TTE standing for Toyota Team Europe) was available as a dealer-installed package. This package was also available for fitting to customer MR2s.

=== Motorsport (W30) ===
==== Super GT ====
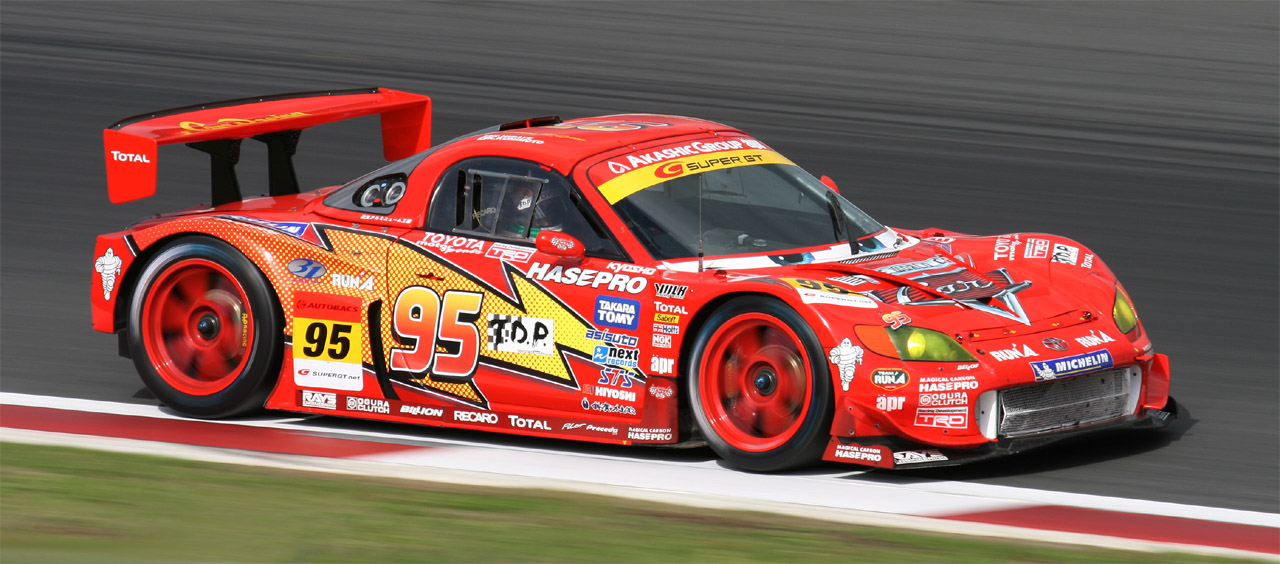
The No. 95 MR-S GT300, operated by the Toyota factory-backed team APR, sporting the Lightning McQueen-based livery as it appeared in the 2008 Super GT season

Between 2000 and 2008, several teams campaigned the MR-S in Super GT (known as JGTC prior to the 2004 season).

- In 2002, Morio Nitta and Shinichi Takagi shared the GT300 drivers' championship in the ARTA MR-S.
- Team Reckless's MR-S won both the drivers' and teams' championships in 2005, driven by Kota Sasaki and Tetsuya Yamano.
- For 2007, Kazuya Oshima and Hiroaki Ishiura shared the drivers' championship in the Toy Story APR MR-S, with wins at Okayama and Sepang, but lost the teams' championship by six points to the Mooncraft Shiden prototype racer of team Privée Kenzo Asset Shiden.

== The future ==
On March 8, 2017, automotive website and magazine Evo revealed that Toyota had expressed a desire for a performance range of cars whose core has been referred to as "the Three Brothers" by Tetsuya Tada, chief of Toyota Gazoo Racing. This included a lightweight mid-engined sports car, rumored to be a spiritual, if not direct, successor to the MR2.

== Bibliography ==
- "2000–2005 MR2 Spyder: Year-to-year Changes". Consumer Guide Automotive. Archived from the original on 2012-04-22.
- Burton, Nigel (2015). Toyota MR2: The Complete Story. Ramsbury, Marlborough: Crowood. ISBN 9781847979322.
- Heick, Terrell (2009). Toyota MR2 Performance HP1553: A Practical Owner's Guide for Everyday. HPBooks. HP1553.
- Long, Brian (2002). Toyota MR2 Coupe & Spyders. Veloce Publishing. ISBN 1903706165.
