= 1996 Formula Nippon Championship =

The 1996 Formula Nippon Championship was the twenty-fourth season of premier Japanese single-seater racing, the first season under the management of the newly created Japan Race Promotion (JRP), and the first under the name Formula Nippon, after changing its name from the All-Japan Formula 3000 Championship.

The season was contested over 10 rounds across five venues. Fifteen different teams, 28 different drivers, three different chassis and three different engines competed. Team LeMans driver Ralf Schumacher became the first and only driver to win the Japanese Top Formula championship in his rookie season.

This was the final season for six-time Top Formula Champion Kazuyoshi Hoshino, who announced his retirement from the series prior to the start of the 1997 season. This was also the last year of open tyre competition between Bridgestone and Yokohama Rubber, as Bridgestone would be the series' sole supplier beginning in 1997.

== Teams and drivers ==
Team	#	Driver	Chassis	Engine	Tyre	Rounds
Kamome Service Racing Team with Impul; Calsonic Racing Team with Impul	1	(Japan) Toshio Suzuki	Lola T96/94; Lola T96/52	Mugen MF308	B	All
Kamome Service Racing Team with Impul; Calsonic Racing Team with Impul	19	(Japan) Kazuyoshi Hoshino	Lola T96/95; Lola T96/52	Mugen MF308	B	All
Team Anabuki Dome with Mugen; Team avex Dome with Mugen	2	(Japan) Katsumi Yamamoto	Dome F104i	Mugen MF308	B	All
Team Anabuki Dome with Mugen; Team avex Dome with Mugen	8	(Japan) Shinji Nakano	Dome F104i	Mugen MF308	B	All
Team 5ZIGEN	5	(Italy) Marco Apicella	Reynard 95D; Reynard 96D	Judd KV2	Y	All
Team 5ZIGEN	6	(Japan) Hidetoshi Mitsusada	Lola T95/50; Reynard 96D	Judd KV2	Y	All
Advan Pal Checkers	7	(Japan) Masami Kageyama	Lola T95/50	Judd KV2	Y	All
Advan Pal Checkers	17	(Japan) Taichiro Oonishi	Lola T94/50	Mugen MF308	Y	All
Shionogi Team Nova	9	(Spain) Pedro de la Rosa	Lola T96/51	Mugen MF308	B	All
Shionogi Team Nova	10	(Argentina) Norberto Fontana	Lola T96/51	Mugen MF308	B	All
Slim Beauty House Cerumo	12	(Japan) Yukihiro Hane	Lola T94/50	Mugen MF308	B	All
Nihon Lead Yamada	15	(Japan) Masao Yamada	Lola T94/50	Mugen MF308	Y	1–5, 7–8, 10
Nihon Lead Yamada	15	(Japan) Tetsuya Tanaka	Lola T94/50	Mugen MF308	Y	6, 9
Kanagawa Clinic Stellar	20	(United Kingdom) Andrew Gilbert-Scott	Reynard 96D	Mugen MF308	B	All
Kanagawa Clinic Stellar	21	(Germany) Michael Krumm	Reynard 96D	Mugen MF308	B	All
X Japan Racing Team LeMans	24	(Japan) Naoki Hattori	Reynard 96D	Mugen MF308	B	All
X Japan Racing Team LeMans	25	(Germany) Ralf Schumacher	Reynard 96D	Mugen MF308	B	All
Navi Connection Racing Team	27	(Japan) Masahiko Kageyama	Reynard 96D	Mugen MF308	B	All
Navi Connection Racing Team	28	(Japan) Masahiko Kondo	Reynard 94D; Reynard 95D	Mugen MF308	B	1–7, 9–10
Navi Connection Racing Team	28	(Denmark) Tom Kristensen	Reynard 94D; Reynard 95D	Mugen MF308	B	8
Art Brilliant Gullwing	30	(Japan) Eiichi Tajima	Lola T94/50	Mugen MF308	B	All
Art Brilliant Gullwing	31	(Japan) Hideki Okada	Lola T95/50	Mugen MF308	B	All
Funai Super Aguri	55	(Japan) Katsutomo Kaneishi	Reynard 95D	Mugen MF308	B	All
Funai Super Aguri	56	(Japan) Satoshi Motoyama	Reynard 95D	Mugen MF308	B	All
PIAA Nakajima Racing	64	(Japan) Toranosuke Takagi	Reynard 96D	Mugen MF308	B	All
PIAA Nakajima Racing	65	(Japan) Takuya Kurosawa	Reynard 96D	Mugen MF308	B	All
Asahi Kiko Sports	72	(Japan) Atsushi Kawamoto	Lola T93	Cosworth DFV	B	All
Asahi Kiko Sports	73	(Japan) Tetsuji Tamanaka	Lola T93	Cosworth DFV	B	All

== Race calendar and results ==
All races were held in Japan.

Race	Track	Date	Pole position	Fastest Race Lap	Winning driver	Winning team
1	Suzuka Circuit	28 April	(Japan) Toranosuke Takagi	(Germany) Michael Krumm	(Japan) Kazuyoshi Hoshino	Calsonic Racing Team with Impul
2	Mine Circuit	12 May	(Germany) Michael Krumm	(Argentina) Norberto Fontana	(Germany) Ralf Schumacher	X Japan Racing Team LeMans
3	Fuji Speedway	26 May	(Germany) Ralf Schumacher	(Argentina) Norberto Fontana	(Argentina) Norberto Fontana	Shionogi Team Nova
4	Tokachi International Speedway	23 June	(Japan) Toranosuke Takagi	(Germany) Michael Krumm	(Germany) Ralf Schumacher	X Japan Racing Team LeMans
5	Suzuka Circuit	7 July	(Japan) Toranosuke Takagi	(Japan) Shinji Nakano	(Japan) Toranosuke Takagi	PIAA Nakajima Racing
6	Sportsland SUGO	4 August	(Japan) Toranosuke Takagi	(Japan) Toranosuke Takagi	(Japan) Toranosuke Takagi	PIAA Nakajima Racing
7	Fuji Speedway	1 September	(Japan) Naoki Hattori	(Argentina) Norberto Fontana	(Japan) Naoki Hattori	X Japan Racing Team LeMans
8	Mine Circuit	15 September	(Japan) Toshio Suzuki	(Japan) Katsutomo Kaneishi	(Germany) Ralf Schumacher	X Japan Racing Team LeMans
9	Suzuka Circuit	29 September	(Germany) Ralf Schumacher	(Japan) Shinji Nakano	(Japan) Naoki Hattori	X Japan Racing Team LeMans
10	Fuji Speedway	20 October	(Japan) Kazuyoshi Hoshino	(Japan) Shinji Nakano	(Japan) Katsutomo Kaneishi	Funai Super Aguri

== Championship standings ==
=== Drivers' Championship ===
Scoring system

Position	1st	2nd	3rd	4th	5th	6th
Points	10	6	4	3	2	1

Rank	Driver	SUZ	MIN	FUJ	TOK	SUZ	SUG	FUJ	MIN	SUZ	FUJ	Points
1	(Germany) Ralf Schumacher	3	1	**19**	1	4	Ret	Ret	1	**4**	Ret	40
2	(Japan) Naoki Hattori	8	Ret	2	3	3	8	**1**	3	1	Ret	38
3	(Japan) Kazuyoshi Hoshino	1	Ret	3	4	5	2	Ret	Ret	2	**Ret**	31
4	(Japan) Toranosuke Takagi	**Ret**	3	Ret	**Ret**	**1**	**1**	Ret	Ret	6	Ret	25
5	(Argentina) Norberto Fontana	14	2	1	Ret	8	Ret	2	Ret	11	Ret	22
6	(Japan) Shinji Nakano	2	13	Ret	9	6	7	3	2	9	4	20
7	(Japan) Katsutomo Kaneishi	6	Ret	4	5	7	Ret	4	Ret	Ret	1	19
8	(Spain) Pedro de la Rosa	5	7	6	6	Ret	11	6	Ret	5	2	13
9	(Japan) Takuya Kurosawa	Ret	8	15	7	2	5	8	5	8	Ret	10
10	(Japan) Satoshi Motoyama	7	Ret	5	17	12	3	5	6	Ret	DNS	9
11	(Japan) Masami Kageyama	10	5	Ret	2	17	15	9	11	Ret	Ret	8
12	(Japan) Toshio Suzuki	18	Ret	12	11	9	10	7	**4**	3	Ret	7
13	(United Kingdom) Andrew Gilbert-Scott	Ret	Ret	7	14	Ret	4	Ret	7	Ret	5	5
14	(Japan) Masahiko Kageyama	Ret	Ret	Ret	Ret	16	12	Ret	9	7	3	4
14	(Germany) Michael Krumm	4	**6**	11	16	11	9	Ret	Ret	Ret	Ret	4
16	(Italy) Marco Apicella	12	4	8	8	14	13	12	Ret	10	Ret	3
17	(Japan) Katsumi Yamamoto	9	Ret	10	Ret	Ret	6	Ret	10	Ret	Ret	1
17	(Japan) Masahiko Kondo	Ret	9	16	13	Ret	Ret	14		Ret	6	1
–	(Japan) Atsushi Kawamoto	Ret	11	Ret	15	19	16	13	Ret	Ret	7	0
–	(Denmark) Tom Kristensen								8			0
–	(Japan) Hidetoshi Mitsusada	Ret	Ret	9	Ret	10	14	10	12	Ret	Ret	0
–	(Japan) Hideki Okada	11	Ret	17	10	20	Ret	11	10	Ret	DNS	0
–	(Japan) Taichiro Ohnishi	15	10	14	Ret	15	Ret	Ret	Ret	14	Ret	0
–	(Japan) Eiichi Tajima	13	12	13	12	18	Ret	Ret	Ret	Ret	DNS	0
–	(Japan) Yukihiro Hane	16	Ret	Ret	Ret	13	Ret	16	13	12	Ret	0
–	(Japan) Tetsuya Tanaka						Ret			13		0
–	(Japan) Tetsuji Tamanaka	17	Ret	Ret	Ret	Ret	Ret	Ret	15	Ret	NC	0
–	(Japan) Masao Yamada	DNQ	DNQ	18	DNQ	DNQ		15	DNQ		Ret	0

Colour	Result
Gold	Winner
Silver	Second place
Bronze	Third place
Green	Points classification
Blue	Non-points classification
Blue	Non-classified finish (NC)
Purple	Retired, not classified (Ret)
Red	Did not qualify (DNQ)
Red	Did not pre-qualify (DNPQ)
Black	Disqualified (DSQ)
White	Did not start (DNS)
White	Withdrew (WD)
White	Race cancelled (C)
Blank	Did not practice (DNP)
Blank	Did not arrive (DNA)
Blank	Excluded (EX)

**Bold** – Pole
Italics – Fastest Lap

=== Team's championship ===
Rank	Team	Car	SUZ	MIN	FUJ	TOK	SUZ	SUG	FUJ	MIN	SUZ	FUJ	Points
1	X-Japan Le Mans	24	8	Ret	2	3	3	8	**1**	3	1	Ret	78
1	X-Japan Le Mans	25	3	1	**19**	1	4	Ret	Ret	1	**4**	Ret	78
2	Team Impul	1	18	Ret	12	11	9	10	7	**4**	3	Ret	38
2	Team Impul	19	1	Ret	3	4	5	2	Ret	Ret	2	**Ret**	38
3	PIAA Nakajima	64	**Ret**	3	Ret	**Ret**	**1**	**1**	Ret	Ret	6	Ret	35
3	PIAA Nakajima	65	Ret	8	15	7	2	5	8	5	8	Ret	35
4	Shionogi Nova	9	5	7	6	6	Ret	11	6	Ret	5	2	35
4	Shionogi Nova	10	14	2	1	Ret	8	Ret	2	Ret	11	Ret	35
5	Funai Super Aguri	55	6	Ret	4	5	7	Ret	4	Ret	Ret	1	35
5	Funai Super Aguri	56	7	Ret	5	17	12	3	5	6	Ret	DNS	35
6	Mugen Dome	2	9	Ret	10	Ret	Ret	6	Ret	10	Ret	Ret	21
6	Mugen Dome	8	2	13	Ret	9	6	7	3	2	9	4	21
7	Kanagawa Clinic Stellar	20	Ret	Ret	7	14	Ret	4	Ret	7	Ret	5	9
7	Kanagawa Clinic Stellar	21	4	**6**	11	16	11	9	Ret	Ret	Ret	Ret	9
8	Pal Checkers	7	10	5	Ret	2	17	15	9	11	Ret	Ret	8
8	Pal Checkers	17	15	10	14	Ret	15	Ret	Ret	Ret	14	Ret	8
9	Navi Connection	27	Ret	Ret	Ret	Ret	16	12	Ret	9	7	3	5
9	Navi Connection	28	Ret	9	16	13	Ret	Ret	14	8	Ret	6	5
10	5Zigen	5	12	4	8	8	14	13	12	Ret	10	Ret	3
10	5Zigen	6	Ret	Ret	9	Ret	10	14	10	12	Ret	Ret	3
–	Asahi Kiko Sports	72	Ret	11	Ret	15	19	16	13	Ret	Ret	7	0
–	Asahi Kiko Sports	73	17	Ret	Ret	Ret	Ret	Ret	Ret	15	Ret	NC	0
–	Art Brilliant Gullwing	30	13	12	13	12	18	Ret	Ret	Ret	Ret	DNS	0
–	Art Brilliant Gullwing	31	11	Ret	17	10	20	Ret	11	10	Ret	DNS	0
–	Slim Beauty House Cerumo	12	16	Ret	Ret	Ret	13	Ret	16	13	12	Ret	0
–	Nihon Lead Yamada	15	DNQ	DNQ	18	DNQ	DNQ	Ret	15	DNQ	13	Ret	0

Colour	Result
Gold	Winner
Silver	Second place
Bronze	Third place
Green	Points classification
Blue	Non-points classification
Blue	Non-classified finish (NC)
Purple	Retired, not classified (Ret)
Red	Did not qualify (DNQ)
Red	Did not pre-qualify (DNPQ)
Black	Disqualified (DSQ)
White	Did not start (DNS)
White	Withdrew (WD)
White	Race cancelled (C)
Blank	Did not practice (DNP)
Blank	Did not arrive (DNA)
Blank	Excluded (EX)

**Bold** – Pole
Italics – Fastest Lap

== Complete Overview ==
first column of every race	10	= grid position

second column of every race	10	= race result

R=retired NC=not classified NS=did not start NQ=did not qualify

Place	Name	Country	Team	Chassis	Engine	(Japan)		(Japan)		(Japan)		(Japan)		(Japan)		(Japan)		(Japan)		(Japan)		(Japan)		(Japan)
1	Ralf Schumacher	Germany	Team LeMans	Reynard	Mugen Honda	10	3	8	1	1	19	4	1	8	4	8	R	8	R	3	1	1	4	9	R
2	Naoki Hattori	Japan	Team LeMans	Reynard	Mugen Honda	9	8	10	R	2	2	5	3	2	3	16	8	1	1	7	3	2	1	3	R
3	Kazuyoshi Hoshino	Japan	Team Impul	Lola	Mugen Honda	2	1	4	R	5	3	18	4	4	5	3	2	4	R	6	R	4	2	1	R
4	Toranosuke Takagi	Japan	Nakajima Racing	Reynard	Mugen Honda	1	R	5	3	10	R	1	R	1	1	1	1	2	R	19	R	3	6	4	R
5	Norberto Fontana	Argentina	Team Nova	Lola	Mugen Honda	16	14	11	2	4	1	8	R	22	8	15	R	6	2	8	R	17	11	11	R
6	Shinji Nakano	Japan	Dome Mugen	Dome	Mugen	4	2	22	13	3	R	10	9	13	6	14	7	3	3	4	2	21	9	5	4
7	Katsutomo Kaneishi	Japan	Super Aguri	Reynard	Mugen Honda	13	6	17	R	8	4	11	5	12	7	6	R	14	4	5	R	11	R	7	1
8	Pedro de la Rosa	Spain	Team Nova	Lola	Mugen Honda	11	5	3	7	7	6	9	6	7	R	9	11	5	6	2	R	6	5	14	2
9	Takuya Kurosawa	Japan	Nakajima Racing	Reynard	Mugen Honda	18	R	18	8	15	15	2	7	3	2	7	5	10	8	12	5	7	8	8	R
10	Satoshi Motoyama	Japan	Super Aguri	Reynard	Mugen Honda	15	7	9	R	14	5	19	17	10	12	4	3	7	5	9	6	12	R	2	NS
11	Masami Kageyama	Japan	Advan Sport Pal	Lola	Mugen Honda	14	10	12	5	11	R	7	2	16	17	11	15	20	9	15	11	13	R	18	R
12	Toshio Suzuki	Japan	Team Impul	Lola	Mugen Honda	5	18	2	R	18	12	3	11	6	9	12	10	13	7	1	4	5	3	13	R
13	Andrew Gilbert Scott	United Kingdom	Stellar International	Reynard	Mugen Honda	21	R	19	R	17	7	13	14	9	R	2	4	23	R	13	7	15	R	15	5
14	Michael Krumm	Germany	Stellar International	Reynard	Mugen Honda	3	4	1	6	19	11	6	16	17	11	10	9	16	R	18	R	14	R	17	R
	Masahiko Kageyama	Japan	Navi Connection Racing	Reynard	Mugen Honda	8	R	15	R	12	R	16	R	5	16	13	12	9	R	16	9	8	7	12	3
16	Marco Apicella	Italy	Team 5Zigen	Reynard	Judd	12	12	6	4	6	8	17	8	24	14	26	13	11	12	11	R	9	10	10	R
17	Katsumi Yamamoto	Japan	Dome Mugen	Dome	Mugen	7	9	13	R	13	10	15	R	15	R	5	6	12	R	20	14	10	R	16	R
	Masahiko Kondo	Japan	Navi Connection Racing	Reynard	Mugen Honda	20	R	21	9	22	16	22	13	20	R	17	R	19	14	-	-	20	R	19	6
-	Atsushi Kawamoto	Japan	Asahi Kiko Sports	Lola	Cosworth	22	R	20	11	24	R	21	15	19	19	21	16	22	13	24	R	19	R	20	7
-	Tom Kristensen	Denmark	Navi Connection Racing	Reynard	Mugen Honda	-	-	-	-	-	-	-	-	-	-	-	-	-	-	10	8	-	-	-	-
-	Hidetoshi Mitsusada	Japan	Team 5Zigen	Lola	Judd	6	R	16	R	9	9	14	R	11	10
-	Hidetoshi Mitsusada	Japan	Team 5Zigen	Reynard	Judd											22	14	15	10	17	12	16	R	6	R
-	Hideki Okada	Japan	Team Gullwing	Lola	Mugen Honda	17	11	7	R	16	17	12	10	14	20	18	R	18	11	21	10	24	R	21	NS
-	Taichiro Oonishi	Japan	Advan Sport Pal	Lola	Mugen Honda	23	15	24	10	21	14	23	R	21	15	24	R	24	R	23	R	23	14	24	R
-	Eiichi Tajima	Japan	Team Gullwing	Lola	Mugen Honda	19	13	14	12	20	13	20	12	18	18	20	R	21	R	22	R	26	R	22	NS
-	Yukihiro Hane	Japan	Team Cerumo	Lola	Mugen Honda	24	16	23	R	23	R	24	R	23	13	19	R	17	16	14	13	18	12	23	R
-	Tetsuya Tanaka	Japan	Nihon Lead Yamada	Lola	Mugen Honda	-	-	-	-	-	-	-	-	-	-	23	R	-	-	-	-	22	13	-	-
-	Tetsuji Tamanaka	Japan	Asahi Kiko Sports	Lola	Cosworth	25	17	25	R	25	R	25	R	25	R	25	R	25	R	25	15	25	R	25	NC
-	Masao Yamada	Japan	Nihon Lead Yamada	Lola	Mugen Honda	26	NQ	26	NQ	26	18	26	NQ	26	NQ	-	-	26	15	26	NQ	-	-	26	R
