= 1998 Formula Nippon Championship =

The 1998 Formula Nippon Championship was the twenty-sixth season of premier Japanese single-seater racing, and the third under the Formula Nippon name and Japan Race Promotion (JRP) management. The series was scheduled to take place over ten rounds, though one round at Fuji Speedway was cancelled due to weather, leaving only nine rounds at five venues. Team LeMans driver Satoshi Motoyama won his first career championship.

14 different teams, 29 different drivers, and three different chassis series. It was the first season in which Mugen supplied engines to all teams, though open tuning was still permitted. As was the case in 1997, each round saw a Special Stage after the original qualifying. The best six qualifiers had to compete in a separate session for the pole.

== Teams and drivers ==
All teams used tyres supplied by Bridgestone and Mugen MF308 engines.

Team	#	Driver	Chassis	Rounds
Shionogi Team Nova	1	(Japan) Masami Kageyama	Lola T97/51	All
Shionogi Team Nova	2	(Republic of Ireland) Ralph Firman Jr.	Lola T96/51	All
Asahi Kiko Sports	3	(Japan) Atsushi Kawamoto	Reynard 96D	All
Team 5ZIGEN	5	(Belgium) Marc Goossens	Reynard 97D	All
Team 5ZIGEN	6	(Japan) Shigekazu Wakisaka	Reynard 96D	All
LEMONed Racing Team LeMans	7	(Argentina) Norberto Fontana	Reynard 97D	All
LEMONed Racing Team LeMans	8	(Japan) Satoshi Motoyama	Reynard 97D	All
Cosmo Oil Racing Team Cerumo	11	(Japan) Hideki Noda	Lola T98/51	All
Cosmo Oil Racing Team Cerumo	12	(Japan) Akira Iida	Lola T96/52	3–10
Jaccs Mooncraft M.S.P	14	(Japan) Ryō Michigami	Reynard 96D	All
Team TMS	17	(Japan) Masahiko Kondō	Reynard 97D	All
Team TMS	18	(Japan) Tsuyoshi Takahashi	Reynard 97D	1–2
Team TMS	18	(Japan) Yuji Tachikawa	Reynard 97D	3–10
Maziora Team Impul	19	(Japan) Takuya Kurosawa	Lola T98/51	All
Maziora Team Impul	20	(Japan) Masahiko Kageyama	Lola T96/52	All
Be Brides Racing	21	(Japan) Tetsuya Tanaka	Lola T95/50	All
Be Brides Racing	22	(Japan) Akira Ishikawa	Lola T96/52	All
Kyoetsu Stellar; Stellar International	35	(Japan) Tokiyasu Soda	Reynard 96D	1
Kyoetsu Stellar; Stellar International	35	(Sri Lanka) Dilantha Malagamuwa	Reynard 96D	7–9
Takagi B-1 Racing	36	(Japan) Tetsuji Tamanaka	Lola T96/51	All
Takagi B-1 Racing	37	(Japan) Masao Yamada	Lola T95/50; Lola T94/50	2–5
Autobacs Racing Team Aguri	55	(Japan) Katsutomo Kaneishi	Lola T98/51	All
Autobacs Racing Team Aguri	56	(Japan) Juichi Wakisaka	Lola T97/51	All
Team LeyJun	62	(Japan) Shinsuke Shibahara	Reynard 95D; Reynard 96D	All
Team LeyJun	63	(Japan) "Osamu"	Reynard 95D; Reynard 97D	1, 4–10
Team LeyJun	63	(Japan) Taichiro Oonishi	Reynard 95D; Reynard 97D	2–3
PIAA Nakajima Racing	64	(Japan) Koji Yamanishi	Reynard 97D	1–4, 6–10
PIAA Nakajima Racing	64	(Japan) Tsugio Matsuda	Reynard 97D	5
PIAA Nakajima Racing	65	(Netherlands) Tom Coronel	Reynard 97D	All

Masao Yamada died from a subarachnoid hemorrhage on 12 July 1998.

== Race calendar and results ==
All races were held in Japan.

Race	Track	Date	Pole position	Fastest Race Lap	Winning driver	Winning team
1	Suzuka Circuit	19 April	(Republic of Ireland) Ralph Firman Jr.	(Netherlands) Tom Coronel	(Japan) Masahiko Kageyama	Maziora Team Impul
2	Mine Circuit	17 May	(Japan) Juichi Wakisaka	(Japan) Satoshi Motoyama	(Japan) Satoshi Motoyama	LEMONed Racing Team LeMans
3	Fuji Speedway	31 May	(Japan) Satoshi Motoyama	(Japan) Katsutomo Kaneishi	(Japan) Satoshi Motoyama	LEMONed Racing Team LeMans
4	Twin Ring Motegi	14 June	(Argentina) Norberto Fontana	(Japan) Hideki Noda	(Japan) Juichi Wakisaka	Autobacs Racing Team Aguri
5	Suzuka Circuit	5 July	(Japan) Masahiko Kageyama	(Japan) Juichi Wakisaka	(Japan) Masahiko Kageyama	Maziora Team Impul
6	Sportsland SUGO	2 August	(Japan) Masami Kageyama	(Japan) Masami Kageyama	(Japan) Masami Kageyama	Shionogi Team Nova
7	Fuji Speedway	30 August	(Japan) Takuya Kurosawa	Race cancelled		
8	Mine Circuit	20 September	(Japan) Hideki Noda	(Japan) Satoshi Motoyama	(Japan) Satoshi Motoyama	LEMONed Racing Team LeMans
9	Fuji Speedway	18 October	(Japan) Masami Kageyama	(Japan) Hideki Noda	(Argentina) Norberto Fontana	LEMONed Racing Team LeMans
10	Suzuka Circuit	29 November	(Japan) Satoshi Motoyama	(Japan) Masami Kageyama	(Japan) Masami Kageyama	Shionogi Team Nova

Round 7 at Fuji Speedway was cancelled due to weather conditions.

== Championship standings ==
=== Drivers' Championship ===
Scoring system

Position	1st	2nd	3rd	4th	5th	6th
Points	10	6	4	3	2	1

Rank	Name	SUZ	MIN	FUJ	MOT	SUZ	SGO	FUJ	MIN	FUJ	SUZ	Points
1	(Japan) Satoshi Motoyama	Ret	1	1	2	Ret	4	C	1	2	Ret	45
2	(Japan) Masami Kageyama	2	10	Ret	3	3	1	C	6	4	1	38
3	(Japan) Juichi Wakisaka	Ret	2	Ret	1	4	Ret	C	Ret	Ret	2	25
4	(Argentina) Norberto Fontana	3	Ret	6	Ret	Ret	Ret	C	2	1	8	21
5	(Japan) Masahiko Kageyama	1	Ret	Ret	8	1	Ret	C	Ret	Ret	6	21
6	(Belgium) Marc Goossens	6	4	Ret	Ret	2	Ret	C	3	Ret	4	17
7	(Japan) Katsutomo Kaneishi	4	5	2	Ret	Ret	7	C	5	10	Ret	13
8	(Republic of Ireland) Ralph Firman Jr.	12	Ret	Ret	Ret	Ret	2	C	4	3	7	13
9	(Japan) Ryō Michigami	7	3	4	9	Ret	Ret	C	Ret	Ret	3	11
10	(Japan) Hideki Noda	5	Ret	5	6	Ret	3	C	Ret	9	Ret	9
11	(Netherlands) Tom Coronel	8	6	Ret	4	5	5	C	Ret	Ret	14	8
12	(Japan) Takuya Kurosawa	Ret	Ret	3	Ret	Ret	Ret	C	Ret	Ret	5	6
13	(Japan) Yuji Tachikawa			9	5	Ret	Ret	C	Ret	Ret	9	2
14	(Japan) Akira Iida			8	Ret	Ret	9	C	Ret	5	12	2
15	(Japan) Tsugio Matsuda					6						1
16	(Japan) Koji Yamanishi	Ret	7	Ret	Ret		6	C	Ret	Ret	11	1
17	(Japan) Tetsuya Tanaka	Ret	Ret	7	Ret	Ret	11	C	Ret	6	16	1
18	(Japan) Masahiko Kondō	9	8	11	10	7	8	C	7	7	Ret	0
19	(Japan) Shigekazu Wakisaka	10	Ret	10	7	Ret	Ret	C	Ret	Ret	10	0
20	(Japan) Akira Ishikawa	Ret	Ret	Ret	11	9	10	C	Ret	8	15	0
21	(Japan) Tetsuji Tamanaka	Ret	11	14	13	Ret	Ret	C	8	Ret	17	0
22	(Japan) "Osamu"	13			Ret	Ret	13	C	9	Ret	18	0
23	(Japan) Atsushi Kawamoto	Ret	9	Ret	Ret	Ret	Ret	C	Ret	Ret	13	0
24	(Japan) Shinsuke Shibahara	11	Ret	12	12	Ret	Ret	C	10	Ret	Ret	0
25	(Sri Lanka) Dilantha Malagamuwa							C	Ret	12		0
26	(Japan) Taichiro Oonishi		Ret	13								0
27	(Japan) Tsuyoshi Takahashi	14	Ret									0
28	(Japan) Masao Yamada		Ret	15	Ret	DNQ						0
29	(Japan) Tokiyasu Soda	Ret										0

=== Teams' Championship ===
Rank	Name	Car	SUZ	MIN	FUJ	MOT	SUZ	SGO	FUJ	MIN	FUJ	SUZ	Points
1	LEMONed LeMans	7	3	Ret	6	Ret	Ret	Ret	C	2	1	8	66
1	LEMONed LeMans	8	Ret	1	1	2	Ret	4	C	1	2	Ret	66
2	Shionogi Nova	1	2	10	Ret	3	3	1	C	6	4	1	51
2	Shionogi Nova	2	12	Ret	Ret	Ret	Ret	2	C	4	3	7	51
3	ARTA	55	4	5	2	Ret	Ret	7	C	5	10	Ret	38
3	ARTA	56	Ret	2	Ret	1	4	Ret	C	Ret	Ret	2	38
4	Maziora Impul	19	Ret	Ret	3	Ret	Ret	Ret	C	Ret	Ret	5	27
4	Maziora Impul	20	1	Ret	Ret	8	1	Ret	C	Ret	Ret	6	27
5	5ZIGEN	5	6	4	Ret	Ret	2	Ret	C	3	Ret	4	14
5	5ZIGEN	6	10	Ret	10	7	Ret	Ret	C	Ret	Ret	10	14
6	Jaccs Mooncraft	14	7	3	4	9	Ret	Ret	C	Ret	Ret	3	14
7	Cosmo Oil Cerumo	11	5	Ret	5	6	Ret	3	C	Ret	9	Ret	11
7	Cosmo Oil Cerumo	12			8	Ret	Ret	9	C	Ret	5	12	11
8	PIAA Nakajima	64	Ret	7	Ret	Ret	6	6	C	Ret	Ret	11	10
8	PIAA Nakajima	65	8	6	Ret	4	5	5	C	Ret	Ret	14	10
9	Team TMS	17	9	8	11	10	7	8	C	7	7	Ret	2
9	Team TMS	18	14	Ret	9	5	Ret	Ret	C	Ret	Ret	9	2
10	Be Brides	21	Ret	Ret	7	Ret	Ret	11	C	Ret	6	16	1
10	Be Brides	22	Ret	Ret	Ret	11	9	10	C	Ret	8	15	1
11	Asahi Kiko Sports	3	Ret	9	Ret	Ret	Ret	Ret	C	Ret	Ret	13	0
12	Takagi B-1 Racing	36	Ret	11	14	13	Ret	Ret	C	8	Ret	17	0
12	Takagi B-1 Racing	37		Ret	15	Ret	DNQ						0
13	Team LeyJun	62	11	Ret	12	12	Ret	Ret	C	10	Ret	Ret	0
13	Team LeyJun	63	13	Ret	13	Ret	Ret	13	C	9	Ret	18	0
14	Kyoetsu Stellar; Stellar International	35	Ret						C	Ret	12		0
