= Hidetoshi Mitsusada =

Japanese racing driver

Hidetoshi Mitsusada 光貞秀俊
- Nationality: (Japan) Japanese
- Born: 29 December 1970 (age 55) Osaka, Japan

Super GT
- Years active: 1996-2008
- Teams: Arktech Motorsports; DHG Racing; Hitotsuyama Racing; Raybrig Team Kunimitsu with Mooncraft; Mugen x Dome Project; Nakajima Racing; Toyota Castrol Team Cerumo
- Starts: 70
- Wins: 2
- Poles: 1
- Fastest laps: 1
- Best finish: 3rd in 2001

Previous series
- 1994-2002 1999-2000 1995: Formula Nippon; Formula 3000; Japanese Touring Car Championship

Hidetoshi Mitsusada (光貞秀俊, Mitsusada Hidetoshi; born 29 December 1970) is a Japanese former racing driver and current motorsport announcer. He competed in Formula Nippon and JGTC in the late 1990s and early 2000s, and was test driver for Benetton in Formula One. He currently serves as a commentator for Super GT on J Sports, partnering lead announcer Sascha Boeckle on its live broadcasts.

== Career ==
Mitsusada began competing in Japanese Formula Three in 1991 with Now Motor Sports and secured a podium in his first season with the team. By 1993, he continued to race with the team and won his first race, along with a further four podium finishes. He finished 4th in the championship, and represented the team at the 1993 Macau Grand Prix. In 1994, he graduated to Formula Nippon and drove for DOME. In 1995, he continued racing in Formula Nippon now for Team 5Zigen, and also raced for Toyota Team Cerumo in the Japanese Touring Car Championship. In that series he secured 57 points and two podium finishes driving their Toyota Corona. In 1996, Mitsusada made his debut at the 24 Hours of Le Mans, racing for Team SARD Toyota Co Ltd in their Toyota Supra. He also raced for the first time in Super GT with the Toyota Castrol Team, having close battles with the Lark McLaren F1. A return to Formula Nippon in the same year followed, again with Team 5Zigen, however, over the ten races he scored no points. For 1997, he switched to Cosmo Team Cerumo and saw greater success with three podium finishes and fourth place in the championship.

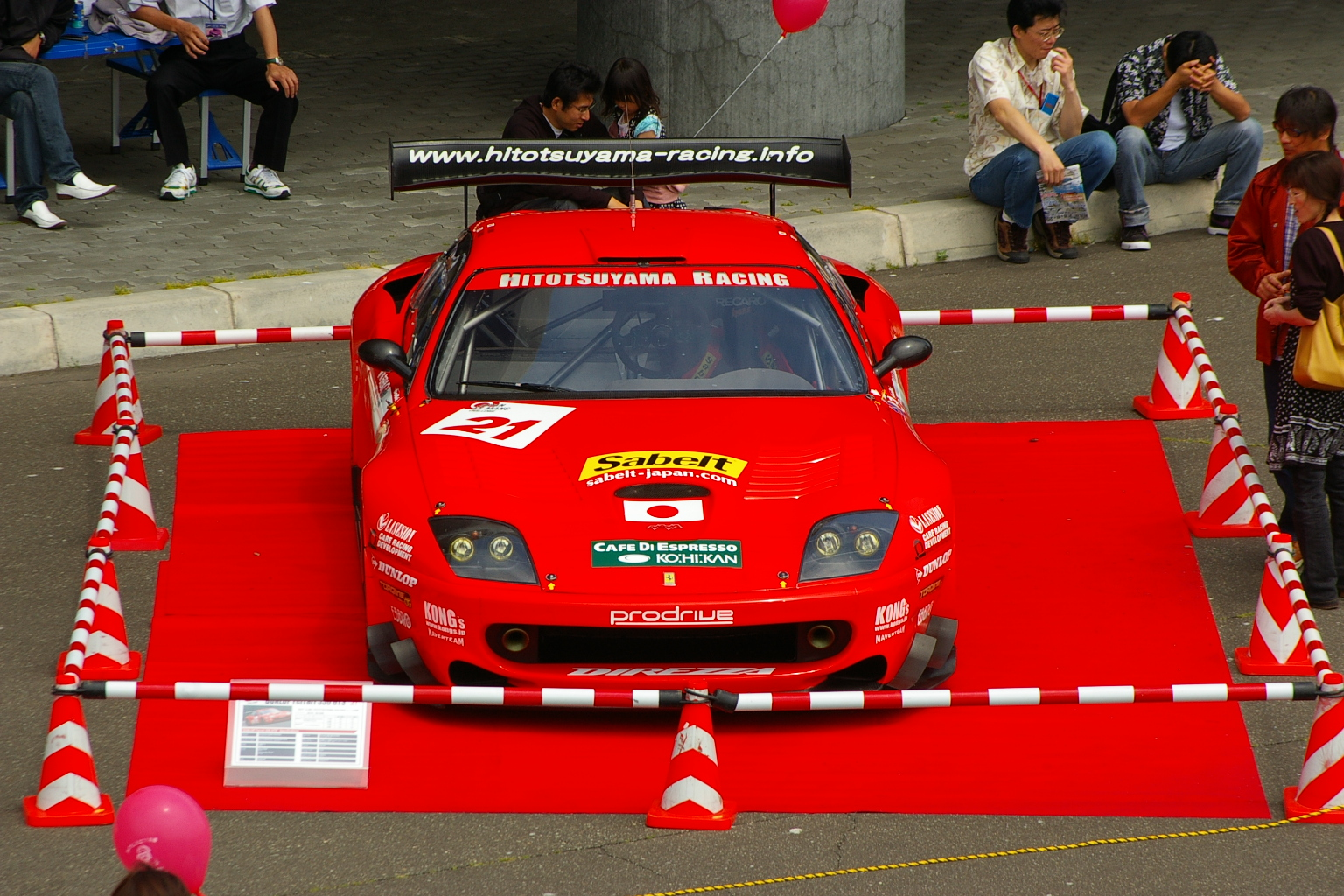
Hitotsuyama Racing's Ferrari 550, a car Mitsusada raced in 2004 and 2005

For 1998, Mitsusada moved away from Japan to compete in the final three rounds of the Formula 3000 International Championship with Nordic Racing. His best result came in the final round of the season with a 15th place finish. He returned to Japan for 1999, and once again competed in Formula Nippon this time with Nakajima Racing. He finished the season in third place, collecting two wins and 31 points along the way. He also raced for the team three times in Super GT, winning one race.

In 2000, Mitsusada was appointed official test driver for the Benetton Formula One team. He would support the drivers developing the B200 race car. Alongside this, he was confirmed to race for World Racing Team in the Formula 3000 International Championship. However, he failed to qualify for any of the first three races and was dropped from his race seat and Benetton test role. He returned to compete in Super GT, now with DOME and secured two podium finishes. He also competed in the 1000km Suzuka race. Across 2001 and 2002, Mitsusada continued to race across both Formula Nippon and Super GT.

In 2003, Mitsusada switched attention purely to the Super GT series. He finished the season in 20th, driving the Raybrig Honda NSX. In 2004, he switched teams to Hitotsuyama Racing where he would stay until the end of 2005 racing their Ferrari 550 Maranello. Between 2006 and 2008, Mitsusada switched from GT500 to the GT300 class, initially with DHG Racing racing their Ford GT. He secured one podium finish in the first season, on his way to 16th in the championship. For his final two seasons, Mitsusada raced the Arktech Motorsports teams Porsche Boxster, finishing 15th and 26th in each season respectively.

In 2013, Mitsusada launched Team MPR a karting team he manages. Mitsusada currently acts as one of the lead commentators for Super GT's live broadcast on J Sports, a role that he has had since at least 2018.

== Racing record ==
=== Complete Japanese Formula 3 results ===
(key) (Races in bold indicate pole position) (Races in italics indicate fastest lap)

Year	Team	engine	1	2	3	4	5	6	7	8	9	10	11	DC	Pts
1991	Now Motor Sports	Mugen	SUZ; 11	FUJ; C	FUJ; DNS	SUZ; 3	TSU; DNS	SEN; 7	MIN; 11	TSU; DNS	SUG; 20	SUZ; 19	SUZ; 13	16th	4
1992	Now Motor Sports	Mugen	SUZ; Ret	TSU; 12	FUJ; 12	SUZ; 13	SEN; 16	TAI; 12	MIN; 12	SUG; 5	SUZ; Ret	SUZ; Ret		13th	2
1993	Now Motor Sports	Toyota	SUZ; 4	TSU; 3	FUJ; 9	SUZ; 5	SEN; 2	**TAI**; 1	MIN; 4	SUG; Ret	SUZ; 3	SUZ; 3		4th	33

=== Complete Formula Nippon results ===
Year	Team	1	2	3	4	5	6	7	8	9	10	DC	Pts
1994	Dome	SUZ; Ret	FUJ; Ret	MIN; 10	SUZ; 9	SUG; 8	FUJ; 12	SUZ; 10	FUJ	FUJ	SUZ	NC	0
1995	Team 5Zigen	SUZ	FUJ	MIN	SUZ; Ret	SUG	FUJ; 7	TOK; Ret	FUJ; Ret	SUZ; 9		NC	0
1996	Team 5Zigen	SUZ; Ret	MIN; Ret	FUJ; 9	TOK; Ret	SUZ; 10	SUG; 14	FUJ; 10	MIN; 12	SUZ; Ret	FUJ; Ret	NC	0
1997	Cosmo Team Cerumo	SUZ; 3	MIN; 7	FUJ; 4	SUZ; 4	SUG; Ret	FUJ; 3	MIN; 3	MOT; 9	FUJ; 5	SUZ	4th	20
1999	Piaa Nakajima Racing	SUZ; 3	**MOT**; 1	MIN; 8	FUJ; 10	SUZ; 5	SUG; 11	FUJ; 4	MIN; 1	MOT; 5	SUZ; 9	**3rd**	**31**
2001	DoCoMo Dandelion Racing	SUZ	MOT	MIN	FUJ	SUZ; 13	SUG	FUJ	MIN	MOT	SUZ	NC	0
2002	Team 5Zigen	SUZ	FUJ	MIN; 5	SUZ; 2	MOT	SUG	FUJ	MIN	MOT	SUZ	9th	8

=== Complete Formula 3000 results ===
Year	Team	1	2	3	4	5	6	7	8	9	10	11	12	Points	Championship
1998	Nordic	GER	SAN	SPA	GBR	MON	FRA	AUS	GER	HUN	BEL; 23	ITA; Ret	GER; 15	0	NC
2000	World Racing Team	SAN; DNQ	GBR; DNQ	SPA; DNQ	GER	MON	FRA	AUS	GER	HUN	BEL			0	NC

=== Complete Japanese Touring Car Championship results ===
(key) (Races in bold indicate pole position) (Races in italics indicate fastest lap)

Year	Team	Car	1	2	3	4	5	6	7	8	9	10	11	12	13	14	15	16	DC	Pts
1995	Toyota Team Cerumo	Toyota Corona	FUJ; 1 Ret	FUJ; 2; 12															7th	57
1995	Toyota Team Cerumo	Toyota Corona EXiV			SUG; 1; 6	SUG; 2; 2	TOK; 1; 7	TOK; 2; 2	SUZ; 1; 4	SUZ; 2; 5	MIN; 1; 6	MIN; 2 Ret	TAI; 1 Ret	TAI; 2 Ret	SEN; 1; 16	SEN; 2 DSQ	FUJ; 1; 5	FUJ; 2; 20	7th	57

=== Complete JGTC/Super GT results ===
(key) (Races in bold indicate pole position) (Races in italics indicate fastest lap)

Year	Team	Car	Class	1	2	3	4	5	6	7	8	9	DC	Pts
1996	Toyota Castrol Team Cerumo	Toyota Supra	GT500	SUZ; 16	FUJ; 4	SEN	FUJ	SUG	MIN				14th	10
1999	Mobil1 Nakajima Racing	Honda NSX	GT500	SUZ	FUJ	SUG	MIN	FUJ; 8	**TAI**; 1	MOT; 5			13th	31
2000	Mugen x Dome Project	Honda NSX	GT500	MOT	FUJ	SUG	FUJ	TAI; 2	MIN; 4	SUZ; 2			7th	40
2001	Mugen x Dome Project	Honda NSX	GT500	**TAI**; 1	FUJ; 8	SUG; 4	FUJ; 5	MOT; 12	SUZ; 2	MIN; 12			**3rd**	**56**
2002	Raybrig Team Kunimitsu with Mooncraft	Honda NSX	GT500	TAI; 9	FUJ; 5	SUG; 2	SEP; 5	FUJ; 8	MOT; 2	MIN; Ret	SUZ; 4		4th	63
2003	Raybrig Team Kunimitsu with Mooncraft	Honda NSX	GT500	TAI; 7	FUJ; 7	SUG; 16	FUJ; 17	FUJ; 13	MOT; 5	AUT; 9	SUZ; 5		12th	27
2004	Hitotsuyama Racing	Ferrari 550	GT500	TAI; 15	SUG; DNQ	SEP; 13	TOK; 16	MOT; 14	AUT; 15	SUZ; 14			NC	0
2005	Hitotsuyama Racing	Ferrari 550	GT500	TAI; Ret	FUJ; Ret	SEP; Ret	SUG; 12	SEP; Ret	FUJ; 15	AUT; 13	SUZ; 15		NC	0
2006	Dhg Racing	Ford GT	GT300	SUZ; DNQ	TAI; DNQ	SUZ; 10	SEP; 5	SUG; Ret	SUZ; Ret	MOT; 5	AUT; 3	FUJ; 15	16th	25
2007	Arktech Motorsports	Porsche Boxster	GT300	SUZ; 6	TAI; 5	FUJ; Ret	SEP; Ret	SUG; 13	SUZ; Ret	MOT; 5	AUT; 7	FUJ; 10	15th	22
2008	Arktech Motorsports	Porsche Boxster	GT300	SUZ; 9	TAI; 17	FUJ; 11	SEP; Ret	SUG; DNQ	SUZ; Ret	MOT; 5	AUT; 13	FUJ; 20	26th	11
