= Tetsuya Tanaka (racing driver) =

Japanese racing driver

Tetsuya Tanaka (田中哲也, Tanaka Tetsuya, born 16 December 1965) is a Japanese racing driver. Since 1996, he has competed in the Japanese Grand Touring Championship for a variety of teams, and has won the Tokachi 24 Hours five times.

== Racing record ==
=== Complete Japanese Formula 3 results ===
(key) (Races in bold indicate pole position) (Races in italics indicate fastest lap)

Year	Team	Engine	1	2	3	4	5	6	7	8	9	10	11	DC	Pts
1989	Megane Super Ralt	Toyota	SUZ	FUJ	SUZ	SEN	TSU	SUG	TSU	SUZ; DNQ		SUZ; 21		NC	0
1989	Giza House Racing	Mugen									NIS; DNQ			NC	0
1990	Kawai Steel Le Garage	VW	SUZ; 16	FUJ; Ret	SUZ; DNQ	TSU; DNQ	SEN; 21	SUG; DNQ	TSU; 18	SUZ; DNQ	NIS; 25	SUZ; DNQ		NC	0
1991	Alexel Shimizu Torii Racing	Toyota	SUZ; 4	FUJ; C	FUJ; 3	SUZ; Ret	TSU; 5	**SEN**; 1	MIN; 4	TSU; 7	SUG; 9	SUZ; 8	SUZ; 5	3rd	23
1992	Sekisui Two You Home with TOM'S	Toyota	SUZ; 10	TSU; Ret	FUJ	SUZ; 17	SEN; 6	TAI; 4	MIN; 2	SUG; 11	SUZ; 5	SUZ; 10		7th	12
1993	Br Sports	Toyota	SUZ; 3	TSU; 6	FUJ; 6	SUZ; Ret	SEN; DNS	TAI; 10	MIN; DNS	SUG; 7	SUZ; 9	SUZ; 6		8th	7
1994	PIAA Nakajima Racing	Mugen	SUZ	FUJ; 8	TSU	SUZ; 11	SEN; 10	TOK; 8	MIN	TAI	SUG; 11	SUZ; 18		NC	0

=== Complete Formula Nippon results ===
(key) (Races in bold indicate pole position; races in italics indicate fastest lap)

Year	Entrant	1	2	3	4	5	6	7	8	9	10	DC	Pts
1996	Nihon Lead Yamada	SUZ	MIN	FUJ	TOK	SUZ	SUG; Ret	FUJ	MIN	SUZ; 13	FUJ	NC	0
1997	Be Brides ARP Asuka	SUZ; Ret	MIN	FUJ	SUZ	SUG; Ret	FUJ; 11	MIN; 14	MOT; Ret	FUJ; 13	SUZ; 6	16th	1
1998	Be Brides Racing	SUZ; Ret	MIN; Ret	FUJ; 7	MOT; Ret	SUZ; Ret	SUG; 11	FUJ; C	MIN; Ret	FUJ; 6	SUZ; 16	17th	1
1999	Team 5ZIGEN	SUZ; Ret	MOT	MIN	FUJ	SUZ; 4	SUG; Ret	FUJ; 11	MIN; Ret	MOT; 14	SUZ; Ret	14th	3

=== Complete JGTC/Super GT results ===
(key) (Races in bold indicate pole position) (Races in italics indicate fastest lap)

Year	Team	Car	Class	1	2	3	4	5	6	7	8	9	DC	Pts
1996	Hasemi Motorsport	Nissan Skyline GT-R	GT500	SUZ; 3	FUJ; 6	SEN; 2	FUJ; 14	SUG; 6	MIN; 5				5th	47
1997	Hasemi Motorsport	Nissan Skyline GT-R	GT500	SUZ; 4	FUJ; 2	SEN; 9	FUJ; 6	MIN; 7	SUG; Ret				7th	37
1998	Hasemi Motorsport	Nissan Skyline GT-R	GT500	SUZ; 5	FUJ; C	SEN; Ret	FUJ; 2	MOT; 8	MIN; 8	SUG; 5			5th	37
1999	Hasemi Motorsport	Nissan Skyline GT-R	GT500	SUZ; 6	FUJ; 7	SUG; 7	MIN; 4	FUJ; 11	TAI; 12	MOT; 8			17th	27
2000	Hasemi Motorsport	Nissan Skyline GT-R	GT500	MOT; 5	FUJ; 9	SUG; Ret	FUJ; 11	TAI; 15	MIN; 11	SUZ; 8			16th	13
2001	NISMO	Nissan Skyline GT-R	GT500	TAI; 4	FUJ; 3	SUG; Ret	FUJ; 1	MOT; 10	SUZ; 8	MIN; 6			5th	52
2002	Impul	Nissan Skyline GT-R	GT500	TAI; 14	FUJ; Ret	SUG; 8	SEP; 14	FUJ; Ret	MOT; 11	MIN; 13	SUZ; 17		23rd	7
2003	Team Gainer	Ferrari 360	GT300	TAI; 13	FUJ; 4	SUG; Ret	FUJ; 2	FUJ; 20	MOT; Ret	AUT; 2	SUZ; 12		8th	46
2004	Team Gainer	Ferrari 360	GT300	TAI; 1	SUG; 8	SEP; 5	TOK; 4	MOT; 3	AUT; 8	SUZ; 3			3rd	64
2005	Jim Gainer	Ferrari 360	GT300	OKA; 6	FUJ; 4	SEP; 4	SUG; Ret	MOT; 9	FUJ; 2	AUT; 5	SUZ; 1		4th	66
2006	Jim Gainer	Ferrari 360	GT300	SUZ; Ret	OKA; 2	FUJ; 19	SEP; 17	SUG; 16	SUZ; 9	MOT; 1	AUT; 19	FUJ; 16	8th	51
2007	Team Nova	Vemac RD350R	GT300	SUZ; 10	OKA; 22	FUJ; 10	SEP; 2	SUG	SUZ; 6	MOT; 10	AUT; Ret	FUJ; 8	13th	27
2008	Jim Gainer	Ferrari F430	GT300	SUZ; 12	OKA; 20	FUJ; 12	SEP; 17	SUG; 12	SUZ; 7	MOT; 24	**AUT**; 8	FUJ; 12	24th	14
2009	Jim Gainer	Ferrari F430 GT2	GT300	**OKA**; 4	SUZ; 4	FUJ; Ret	SEP; 8	SUG; 3	SUZ; 5	FUJ; 2	AUT; 1	MOT; 4	3rd	79
2010	Jim Gainer	Ferrari F430 GT2	GT300	SUZ; Ret	OKA; 7	FUJ; 6	SEP; 4	SUG; 5	SUZ; 8	FUJ; C	MOT; 4		7th	34
2011	Gainer	Ferrari 458 Italia GT2	GT300	**OKA**; 2	FUJ; 2	SEP; 2	SUG; 7	SUZ; 4	FUJ; 22	AUT; 2	MOT; 3		2nd	83
2012	Gainer	Audi R8 LMS ultra	GT300	OKA; 1	**FUJ**; 5	SEP; 7	SUG; 6	SUZ; 5	FUJ; 7	AUT; 16	MOT; 13		7th	47
2013	Gainer	Mercedes-Benz SLS AMG GT3	GT300	OKA; 14	FUJ; 10	SEP; 7	SUG; 10	SUZ; 13	FUJ; 6	FUJ	AUT; 20	MOT; 12	20th	11
2014	Green Tec Racing	Mercedes-Benz SLS AMG GT3	GT300	OKA	FUJ	AUT	SUG; 20	FUJ	SUZ	BUR	MOT		NC	0
