= Atsushi Kawamoto =

Japanese racing driver

Atsushi Kawamoto (川本篤, Kawamoto Atsushi; born April 17, 1966) is a professional race car driver who competed in Formula Nippon from 1996 to 1999.

== Complete Formula Nippon results ==
(key) (Races in bold indicate pole position) (Races in italics indicate fastest lap)

Year	Team	1	2	3	4	5	6	7	8	9	10	DC	Pts
1996	Asahi kiko Sports	SUZ; Ret	MIN; 11	FSW; Ret	TOK; 15	SUZ; 19	SUG; 16	FSW; 13	MIN; Ret	SUZ; Ret	FSW; 7	NC	0
1997	Asahi kiko Sports	SUZ; Ret	MIN; 10	FSW; 16	SUZ; 15	SUG; 9	FSW; Ret	MIN; 12	TRM; 15	FSW; 8	SUZ; 14	NC	0
1998	Asahi kiko Sports	SUZ; Ret	MIN; 9	FSW; Ret	TRM; Ret	SUZ; Ret	SUG; Ret	FSW; C	MIN; Ret	FSW; Ret	SUZ; 13	NC	0
1999	Asahi kiko Sports	SUZ; 8	TRM; Ret	MIN; 11	FSW; 18	SUZ; 13	SUG; Ret	FSW; 13	MIN; 7	TRM; Ret	SUZ; 16	NC	0
