= Takuya Kurosawa =

Japanese racing driver

Takuya Kurosawa (Shinjitai: 黒澤琢弥, Kurosawa Takuya; born in Ibaraki, June 7, 1962) is a Japanese race car driver.

Kurosawa raced in All-Japan Formula Three from 1988 to 1989, Japanese Formula 3000 from 1990 to 1995 and the JGTC series from 1994 to 1999, also driving in the 1998 24 Hours of Le Mans, finishing tenth.

Kurosawa then obtained sponsorship to drive in the American CART series for Dale Coyne Racing in 2000. He made eight starts with a best finish of 12th at the Detroit Grand Prix. He became the first Japanese driver to lead a Champ Car race when he led seven laps at the Long Beach Grand Prix.

Kurosawa then returned to JGTC for the next three seasons, drove in the Super Taikyu series in 2004. He currently competes in the Super GT series, driving a Porsche Boxster for Arktech Motorsports.

Kurosawa is the son of Best Motoring presenter Motoharu Kurosawa, and elder brother of Haruki and Tsubasa Kurosawa, all of whom are racing drivers.

== Racing record ==
=== Complete Japanese Formula 3000 Championship/Formula Nippon results ===
(key) (Races in bold indicate pole position) (Races in italics indicate fastest lap)

Year	Entrant	1	2	3	4	5	6	7	8	9	10	11	DC	Points
1990	taka-Q Racing w/ Team Le Mans	SUZ; Ret	FUJ; 9	MIN; Ret	SUZ; Ret	SUG; 18	FUJ; Ret	FUJ; Ret	SUZ; 19	FUJ; 4	SUZ; Ret		16th	3
1991	Nakajima Racing	SUZ; Ret	AUT; 8	FUJ; 6	MIN; 7	SUZ; Ret	SUG; 15	FUJ; 11	SUZ	FUJ; C	SUZ; 17	FUJ; Ret	22nd	1
1992	Cabin Racing Team w/ Heroes	SUZ; 5	FUJ; Ret	MIN; Ret	SUZ; Ret	AUT; Ret	SUG; 18	FUJ; 4	FUJ; 3	SUZ; Ret	FUJ; 2	SUZ; 2	6th	21
1993	Cabin Racing Team w/ Heroes	SUZ; 4	**SUZ**; Ret	MIN; Ret	SUZ; 15	AUT; C	SUG; 5	FUJ; C	FUJ; Ret	SUZ; Ret	FUJ	SUZ	13th	5
1994	Cosmo Oil Racing Team Cerumo	SUZ; 10	FUJ; 10	MIN; 3	SUZ; 4	SUG; 1	FUJ; 6	SUZ; 4	FUJ; 2	FUJ; 6	SUZ; 2		4th	32 (33)
1995	Nakajima Racing	SUZ; 2	FUJ; C	MIN; Ret	**SUZ**; 4	SUG; Ret	FUJ; 9	TOK; Ret	FUJ; 7	SUZ; 2			6th	15
1996	PIAA Nakajima Racing	SUZ; Ret	MIN; 8	FUJ; 15	TOK; 7	SUZ; 2	SUG; 5	FUJ; 8	MIN; 5	SUZ; 8	FUJ; Ret		9th	10
1997	Team Impul	SUZ; 2	MIN; 2	**FUJ**; 1	SUZ; Ret	SUG; Ret	FUJ; Ret	MIN; Ret	MOT; Ret	FUJ; Ret	SUZ; 2		2nd	28
1998	Maziora Team Impul	SUZ; Ret	MIN; Ret	FUJ; 3	MOT; Ret	SUZ; Ret	SUG; Ret	**FUJ**; C	MIN; Ret	FUJ; Ret	SUZ; 5		12th	6
1999	Team TMS	SUZ; Ret	MOT; Ret	MIN; 12	FUJ; 5	SUZ; 3	SUG; 3	FUJ	MIN	MOT	SUZ		9th	10

=== Complete Japanese Touring Car Championship (1994-) results ===
Year	Team	Car	1	2	3	4	5	6	7	8	9	10	11	12	13	14	15	16	17	18	DC	pts
1994	Toyota Team Cerumo	Toyota Corona	AUT; 1; 8	AUT; 2 DNS	SUG; 1 Ret	SUG; 2 DNS	TOK; 1 DNS	TOK; 2 Ret	SUZ; 1; 9	SUZ; 2 Ret	MIN; 1; 8	MIN; 2 Ret	AID; 1 Ret	AID; 2 Ret	TSU; 1 Ret	TSU; 2; 6	SEN; 1 Ret	SEN; 2; 10	FUJ; 1; 9	FUJ; 2; 9	18th	18
1995	Nakajima Racing	Honda Civic Ferio	FUJ; 1	FUJ; 2	SUG; 1	SUG; 2	TOK; 1	TOK; 2	SUZ; 1 Ret	SUZ; 2 Ret	MIN; 1; 5	MIN; 2; 8	AID; 1; 14	AID; 2 Ret	SEN; 1; 23	SEN; 2; 15	FUJ; 1; 9	FUJ; 2; 11			18th	11
1996	Nakajima Racing	Honda Accord	FUJ; 1; 3	FUJ; 2; 4	SUG; 1; 10	SUG; 2; 7	**SUZ**; **1**; 5	SUZ; 2; 2	MIN; 1	MIN; 2	**SEN**; **1** Ret	**SEN**; **2**; 1	**TOK**; **1**; 3	TOK; 2; 3	FUJ; 1 Ret	**FUJ**; **2** DNS					4th	72
1997	Nakajima Racing	Honda Accord	FUJ; 1 C	FUJ; 2 C	AID; 1; 1	AID; 2; 4	SUG; 1; 5	SUG; 2; 6	**SUZ**; **1**; 1	**SUZ**; **2**; 2	MIN; 1 Ret	MIN; 2; 6	SEN; 1; 7	SEN; 2; 6	TOK; 1; 1	**TOK**; **2**; 1	FUJ; 1; 10	FUJ; 2; 4			2nd	102

=== JGTC/Super GT results ===
(key) (Races in bold indicate pole position) (Races in italics indicate fastest lap)

Year	Team	Car	Class	1	2	3	4	5	6	7	8	9	DC	Pts
1997	Mugen/Dome	Honda NSX	GT500	SUZ	FUJ; Ret	SEN; Ret	FUJ; Ret	**MIN**; 8	SUG; 5				16th	11
1998	Team Impul	Nissan Skyline GT-R	GT500	SUZ; 11	FUJ; C	SEN; 5	FUJ; 3	MOT; 2	MIN; 7	SUG; 4			**3rd**	**49**
1999	Toyota Castrol Team Tom's	Toyota Supra	GT500	SUZ; 4	FUJ; 9	SUG; 1	MIN; 10	**FUJ**; 4	TAI; 4	**MOT**; 1			**2nd**	**73**
2001	Toyota Team Tom's	Toyota Supra	GT500	TAI; 11	FUJ; 10	SUG; 8	FUJ; 8	MOT	SUZ; 5	MIN; 7			15th	19
2002	Toyota Team Tom's	Toyota Supra	GT500	TAI; Ret	FUJ; 12	SUG; 5	SEP; 3	FUJ; 3	MOT; 7	MIN; Ret	SUZ; 16		11th	38
2003	Toyota Team Tom's	Toyota Supra	GT500	TAI; Ret	FUJ; 8	SUG; 13	FUJ; 15	FUJ; 6	MOT; 10	AUT; 13	SUZ; 14		18th	15
2005	Hitotsuyama Racing	Ferrari 550 Maranello	GT500	TAI; Ret	FUJ; Ret	SEP; Ret	SUG; 12	MOT; Ret	FUJ; 15	AUT; 13	SUZ; 15		NC	0
2006	Ebbro Team Nova	Vemac RD350R	GT300	SUZ; 8	TAI; 21	FUJ; 15	SEP; DNS	SUG; 10	SUZ; Ret	MOT; 12	AUT; 15	FUJ; 10	22nd	12
2007	Arktech Motorsports	Porsche Boxster	GT300	SUZ; 6	TAI; 5	FUJ; Ret	SEP; Ret	SUG; 13	SUZ; Ret	MOT; 5	AUT; 7	FUJ; 10	15th	22
2008	Team Takeuchi	Lexus IS350	GT300	SUZ	TAI	FUJ; Ret	SEP; 13	SUG; 17	SUZ; 18	MOT; 8	AUT; 12	FUJ; 13	32nd	3

=== Complete CART results ===
(key)

Year	Team	1	2	3	4	5	6	7	8	9	10	11	12	13	14	15	16	17	18	19	20	Rank	Points	Ref
2000	Dale Coyne Racing	MIA; 24	LBH; 13	RIO; 19	MOT; 20	NZR; DNS	MIL; Wth	DET; 12	POR; 22	CLE; 25	TOR; 23	MIS; DNS	CHI	MDO	ROA	VAN	LS	STL	HOU	SRF	FON	**29th**	**1**	

=== Complete 24 Hours of Le Mans results ===
Year	Team	Co-Drivers	Car	Class	Laps	Pos.	Class Pos.
1998	(Japan) Nissan Motorsports (United Kingdom) TWR	(Japan) Satoshi Motoyama (Japan) Masami Kageyama	Nissan R390 GT1	GT1	319	10th	9th
