= Masao Yamada =

Japanese racing driver

Masao Yamada (Shinjitai: 山田 政夫, born 7 May 1951 – 12 July 1998 ) was a Japanese racing driver.

== Racing record ==
=== Complete Formula Nippon results ===
(key) (Races in bold indicate pole position) (Races in italics indicate fastest lap)

Year	Team	1	2	3	4	5	6	7	8	9	10	DC	Pts
1996	Nihon Lead Yamada	SUZ; DNQ	MIN; DNQ	FUJ; 18	TOK; DNQ	SUZ; DNQ	SUG	FUJ; 15	MIN; DNQ	SUZ	FUJ; Ret	NC	0
1997	Takagi B-1 Racing Team	SUZ; Ret	MIN; 12	FUJ; Ret	SUZ; Ret	SUG; DSQ	FUJ	MIN; DNQ	MOT; DNQ	FUJ; DNQ	SUZ; DNQ	NC	0
1998	Takagi B-1 Racing Team	SUZ	MIN; Ret	FUJ; 15	MOT; Ret	SUZ; DNQ	SUG	FUJ	MIN	FUJ	SUZ	NC	0
