= 1997 Formula Nippon Championship =

The 1997 Formula Nippon Championship was the twenty-fifth season of premier Japanese single-seater racing, and the second under the Formula Nippon name and the management of Japan Race Promotion (JRP). The series was contested over 10 rounds at five venues, including the new Twin Ring Motegi circuit. 17 different teams, 37 different drivers, three different chassis and three different engines competed. This was also the first season with Bridgestone as the series' sole tyre supplier, and the last with multiple engine suppliers before Mugen supplied engines to all teams in 1998.

Beginning in 1997, each round saw a Special Stage after the original qualifying. The best six qualifiers had to compete in a separate session for the pole.

Team Nova driver Pedro de la Rosa won the championship in his second season, with six wins and podium finishes in all ten races. He became the first driver to win the Formula Nippon and All-Japan Grand Touring Car GT500 Championships in the same year.

== Teams and drivers ==
All teams competed with tyres supplied by Bridgestone.

Team	#	Driver	Chassis	Engine	Rounds
Team LeMans	1	(Argentina) Norberto Fontana	Reynard 96D; Reynard 97D	Mugen MF308	All
Team LeMans	2	(Argentina) Esteban Tuero	Reynard 96D	Mugen MF308	1–6
Team LeMans	2	(Germany) Michael Krumm	Reynard 96D	Mugen MF308	8
Team LeMans	2	(Japan) Yuji Tachikawa	Reynard 96D	Mugen MF308	9–10
Asahi Kiko Sports	3	(Japan) Atsushi Kawamoto	Reynard 96D	Mugen MF308	All
Team 5ZIGEN	5	(Belgium) Marc Goossens	Reynard 96D	Judd KV2; Mugen MF308	All
Team 5ZIGEN	6	(Finland) Risto Virtanen	Reynard 95D; Reynard 96D	Judd KV2	1–3
Team 5ZIGEN	6	(Japan) Eiichi Tajima	Reynard 95D; Reynard 96D	Judd KV2	4–10
Team Anabuki Dome with Mugen	8	(Japan) Juichi Wakisaka	Dome F104	Mugen MF308	All
Shionogi Team Nova	9	(Spain) Pedro de la Rosa	Lola T97/51	Mugen MF308	All
Shionogi Team Nova	10	(Japan) Akira Iida	Lola T97/51	Mugen MF308	All
Team Cerumo	11	(Japan) Hidetoshi Mitsusada	Lola T96/52	Mugen MF308	1–9
Team Cerumo	11	(Germany) Michael Krumm	Lola T96/52	Mugen MF308	10
Team Cerumo	12	(Republic of Ireland) Sarah Kavanagh	Reynard 95D; Lola T94/50	Cosworth AC; Mugen MF308	1–2
Team Cerumo	12	(Japan) Shinsuke Shibahara	Reynard 95D; Lola T94/50	Cosworth AC; Mugen MF308	8–10
Team TMS	17	(Japan) Masahiko Kondo	Reynard 97D	Mugen MF308	All
Team TMS	18	(Republic of Ireland) Ralph Firman Jr.	Reynard 97D	Mugen MF308	All
Team Impul	19	(Japan) Takuya Kurosawa	Lola T96/52	Mugen MF308	All
Team Impul	20	(Japan) Masahiko Kageyama	Reynard 96D; Lola T95/50	Mugen MF308	All
Be Brides ARP Asuka	21	(Japan) Tetsuya Tanaka	Lola T95/50	Mugen MF308	1, 5–10
Navi Connection Racing Team	27	(Japan) Masami Kageyama	Reynard 96D; Reynard 97D	Mugen MF308	All
Navi Connection Racing Team	28	(Japan) Katsumi Yamamoto	Reynard 95D; Reynard 96D	Mugen MF308	All
Super Nova with Mirai; Kamome Service with Mirai	32	(Italy) Vincenzo Sospiri	Reynard 95D	Mugen MF308	9–10
Super Nova with Mirai; Kamome Service with Mirai	33	(Japan) Toshio Suzuki	Reynard 95D	Mugen MF308	All
Auto Tech Stellar; STP Stellar	34	(Italy) Mauro Martini	Reynard 96D	Mugen MF308	3
Auto Tech Stellar; STP Stellar	34	(United Kingdom) Andrew Gilbert-Scott	Reynard 96D	Mugen MF308	4, 6, 9
Auto Tech Stellar; STP Stellar	34	(Italy) Andrea Boldrini	Reynard 96D	Mugen MF308	7–8, 10
Auto Tech Stellar; STP Stellar	35	(Germany) Michael Krumm	Reynard 96D	Mugen MF308	1–3
Auto Tech Stellar; STP Stellar	35	(Italy) Marco Apicella	Reynard 96D	Mugen MF308	4–10
Takagi B-1 Racing Team	36	(Japan) Tetsuji Tamanaka	Lola T95/50	Mugen MF308	All
Takagi B-1 Racing Team	37	(Japan) Masao Yamada	Lola T94/50	Mugen MF308	1–5, 7–10
Funai Super Aguri	55	(Japan) Katsutomo Kaneishi	Reynard 96D	Mugen MF308	All
Funai Super Aguri	56	(Japan) Satoshi Motoyama	Reynard 94D; Reynard 97D; Reynard 95D	Mugen MF308	1–9
Funai Super Aguri	56	(Japan) Ryō Michigami	Reynard 94D; Reynard 97D; Reynard 95D	Mugen MF308	10
Team LeyJun; Sri Lanka with Team LeyJun	62	(Japan) Tetsushi Toda	Reynard 94D	Mugen MF308	4–8
Team LeyJun; Sri Lanka with Team LeyJun	63	(Sri Lanka) Dilantha Malagamuwa	Reynard 96D	Mugen MF308	1–5
Team LeyJun; Sri Lanka with Team LeyJun	63	(Japan) "Osamu"	Reynard 96D	Mugen MF308	6–10
PIAA Nakajima Racing	64	(Japan) Toranosuke Takagi	Reynard 97D	Mugen MF308	All
PIAA Nakajima Racing	65	(Japan) Koji Yamanishi	Reynard 97D	Mugen MF308	All

== Race calendar and results ==
All races were held in Japan.

Race	Track	Date	Pole position	Fastest Race Lap	Winning driver	Winning team
1	Suzuka Circuit	27 April	(Japan) Toranosuke Takagi	(Japan) Katsutomo Kaneishi	(Spain) Pedro de la Rosa	Shionogi Team Nova
2	Mine Circuit	18 May	(Japan) Toranosuke Takagi	(Japan) Katsumi Yamamoto	(Spain) Pedro de la Rosa	Shionogi Team Nova
3	Fuji Speedway	1 June	(Japan) Takuya Kurosawa	(Japan) Takuya Kurosawa	(Japan) Takuya Kurosawa	Team Impul
4	Suzuka Circuit	6 July	(Japan) Toranosuke Takagi	(Japan) Masahiko Kageyama	(Japan) Toranosuke Takagi	PIAA Nakajima Racing
5	Sportsland SUGO	3 August	(Spain) Pedro de la Rosa	(Argentina) Norberto Fontana	(Spain) Pedro de la Rosa	Shionogi Team Nova
6	Fuji Speedway	31 August	(Spain) Pedro de la Rosa	(Spain) Pedro de la Rosa	(Spain) Pedro de la Rosa	Shionogi Team Nova
7	Mine Circuit	14 September	(Japan) Toranosuke Takagi	(Spain) Pedro de la Rosa	(Argentina) Norberto Fontana	Team LeMans
8	Twin Ring Motegi	28 September	(Spain) Pedro de la Rosa	(Japan) Masami Kageyama	(Spain) Pedro de la Rosa	Shionogi Team Nova
9	Fuji Speedway	19 October	(Japan) Katsutomo Kaneishi	(Spain) Pedro de la Rosa	(Japan) Katsutomo Kaneishi	Funai Super Aguri
10	Suzuka Circuit	9 November	(Spain) Pedro de la Rosa	(Japan) Masahiko Kageyama	(Spain) Pedro de la Rosa	Shionogi Team Nova

== Championship standings ==
=== Drivers' Championship ===
Scoring system

Position	1st	2nd	3rd	4th	5th	6th
Points	10	6	4	3	2	1

Rank	Name	SUZ	MIN	FUJ	SUZ	SGO	FUJ	MIN	MOT	FUJ	SUZ	Points
1	(Spain) Pedro de la Rosa	1	1	2	3	1	1	2	1	2	1	82
2	(Japan) Takuya Kurosawa	2	2	1	Ret	Ret	Ret	Ret	Ret	Ret	2	28
3	(Argentina) Norberto Fontana	9	8	6	Ret	7	2	1	3	Ret	Ret	21
4	(Japan) Hidetoshi Mitsusada	3	7	4	4	Ret	3	3	9	5		20
5	(Japan) Masami Kageyama	11	9	11	5	6	4	7	2	3	4	19
6	(Japan) Toranosuke Takagi	Ret	DNS	3	1	Ret	Ret	5	Ret	Ret	5	18
7	(Japan) Masahiko Kageyama	Ret	Ret	5	2	3	Ret	15	Ret	12	3	16
8	(Republic of Ireland) Ralph Firman Jr.	Ret	4	15	6	2	13	Ret	5	Ret	11	12
9	(Japan) Katsutomo Kaneishi	7	Ret	Ret	10	Ret	18	8	Ret	1	Ret	10
10	(Japan) Akira Iida	6	3	Ret	7	Ret	5	10	11	Ret	13	7
11	(Japan) Satoshi Motoyama	4	DNS	Ret	Ret	Ret	Ret	6	Ret	4		7
12	(Italy) Marco Apicella				8	5	8	4	Ret	6	8	6
13	(Japan) Toshio Suzuki	8	5	7	Ret	4	16	9	8	Ret	9	5
14	(Japan) Juichi Wakisaka	12	6	Ret	Ret	Ret	7	11	4	Ret	Ret	4
15	(Japan) Koji Yamanishi	5	Ret	8	Ret	Ret	Ret	Ret	17	Ret	7	2
16	(Argentina) Esteban Tuero	Ret	Ret	9	11	Ret	6					1
17	(Germany) Michael Krumm	Ret	13	Ret					6		10	1
18	(Japan) Tetsuya Tanaka	Ret				Ret	11	14	Ret	13	6	1
19	(Japan) Katsumi Yamamoto	10	Ret	Ret	9	Ret	12	Ret	14	7	Ret	0
20	(Italy) Andrea Boldrini							13	7		Ret	0
21	(Japan) Atsushi Kawamoto	Ret	10	16	15	9	Ret	12	15	8	14	0
22	(Japan) Masahiko Kondo	15	DNS	12	14	8	14	Ret	13	11	Ret	0
23	(Japan) Eiichi Tajima				13	Ret	9	Ret	Ret	Ret	12	0
24	(Japan) Yuji Tachikawa									9	Ret	0
25	(Belgium) Marc Goossens	Ret	Ret	Ret	Ret	Ret	10	Ret	10	Ret	Ret	0
26	(Sri Lanka) Dilantha Malagamuwa	Ret	11	14	Ret	10						0
27	(Japan) Shinsuke Shibahara								12	10	Ret	0
28	(Finland) Risto Virtanen	Ret	Ret	10								0
29	(United Kingdom) Andrew Gilbert-Scott				12		Ret			14		0
30	(Japan) Masao Yamada	Ret	12	Ret	Ret	DSQ		DNQ	DNQ	DNQ	DNQ	0
31	(Japan) Tetsuji Tamanaka	13	Ret	13	16	Ret	Ret	Ret	Ret	DNQ	DNQ	0
32	(Republic of Ireland) Sarah Kavanagh	14	Ret									0
33	(Japan) "Osamu"						15	16	16	Ret	16	0
34	(Italy) Vincenzo Sospiri									Ret	15	0
35	(Japan) Tetsushi Toda				17	Ret	17	17	DNQ			0
36	(Italy) Mauro Martini			Ret								0
37	(Japan) Ryō Michigami										Ret	0

=== Teams' Championship ===
Rank	Name	Car	SUZ	MIN	FUJ	SUZ	SGO	FUJ	MIN	MOT	FUJ	SUZ	Points
1	Shionogi Nova	9	1	1	2	3	1	1	2	1	2	1	89
1	Shionogi Nova	10	6	3	Ret	7	Ret	5	10	11	Ret	13	89
2	Impul	19	2	2	1	Ret	Ret	Ret	Ret	Ret	Ret	2	44
2	Impul	20	Ret	Ret	5	2	3	Ret	15	Ret	12	3	44
3	LeMans	1	9	8	6	Ret	7	2	1	3	Ret	Ret	23
3	LeMans	2	Ret	Ret	9	11	Ret	6		6	9	Ret	23
4	PIAA Nakajima	64	Ret	DNS	3	1	Ret	Ret	5	Ret	Ret	5	20
4	PIAA Nakajima	65	5	Ret	8	Ret	Ret	Ret	Ret	17	Ret	7	20
5	Cerumo	11	3	7	4	4	Ret	3	3	9	5	10	20
5	Cerumo	12	14	Ret						12	10	Ret	20
6	Navi Connection	27	11	9	11	5	6	4	7	2	3	4	19
6	Navi Connection	28	10	Ret	Ret	9	Ret	12	Ret	14	7	Ret	19
7	Funai Super Aguri	55	7	Ret	Ret	10	Ret	18	8	Ret	1	Ret	17
7	Funai Super Aguri	56	4	DNS	Ret	Ret	Ret	Ret	6	Ret	4	Ret	17
8	Team TMS	17	15	DNS	12	14	8	14	Ret	13	11	Ret	12
8	Team TMS	18	Ret	4	15	6	2	13	Ret	5	Ret	11	12
9	Stellar	34			Ret	12		Ret	13	7	14	Ret	6
9	Stellar	35	Ret	13	Ret	8	5	8	4	Ret	6	8	6
10	Mirai	32									Ret	15	5
10	Mirai	33	8	5	7	Ret	4	16	9	8	Ret	9	5
11	Dome with Mugen	8	12	6	Ret	Ret	Ret	7	11	4	Ret	Ret	4
12	Be Brides	21	Ret				Ret	11	14	Ret	13	6	1
13	Asahi Kiko Sports	3	Ret	10	16	15	9	Ret	12	15	8	14	0
14	5ZIGEN	5	Ret	Ret	Ret	Ret	Ret	10	Ret	10	Ret	Ret	0
14	5ZIGEN	6	Ret	Ret	10	13	Ret	9	Ret	Ret	Ret	12	0
15	Team LeyJUN	62				17	Ret	17	17	DNQ			0
15	Team LeyJUN	63	Ret	11	14	Ret	10	15	16	16	Ret	16	0
16	Takagi B-1 Racing	36	13	Ret	13	16	Ret	Ret	Ret	Ret	DNQ	DNQ	0
16	Takagi B-1 Racing	37	Ret	12	Ret	Ret	DSQ		DNQ	DNQ	DNQ	DNQ	0
