= Tokachi 24 Hours =

Endurance motor race

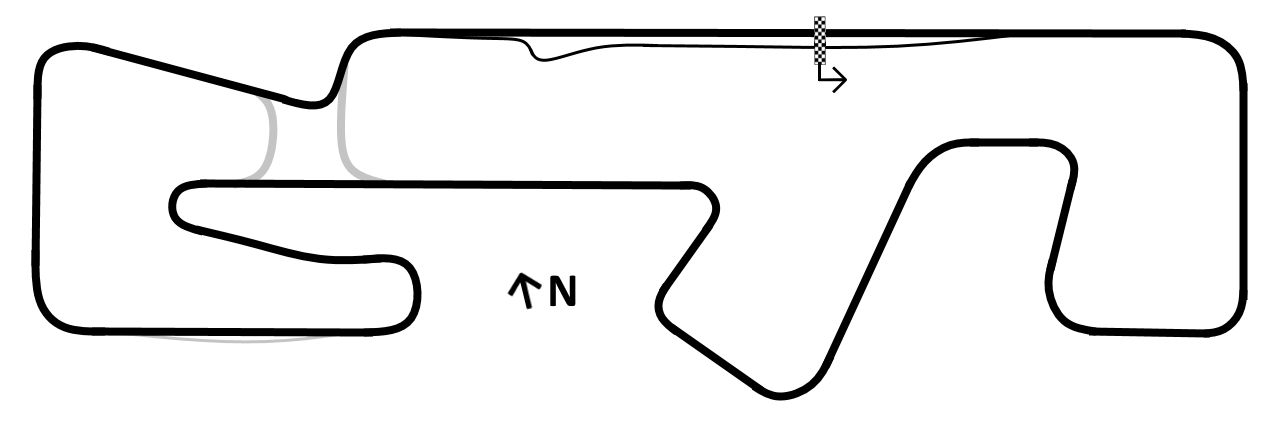
- Venue: Tokachi International Speedway
- First race: 1994
- Last race: 2008
- Duration: 24 Hours
- Most wins (driver): Tetsuya Tanaka (5)
- Most wins (manufacturer): Porsche (6)

The Tokachi 24 Hours (十勝24時間レース) was an endurance race held at the Tokachi International Speedway between 1994 and 2008 for GT and production cars. For each year of the event, the Tokachi 24 Hour was part of the Super Taikyu championship, however cars and teams from Super GT were able to participate in the event; where most recently in 2007 a Hybrid GT500 Toyota Supra HV-R was able to win the race overall.

For each race between 1995 and 2002, and along with the 2007 and 2008 races, the 'Grand Prix' layout of 5.091 km was used, for all the other races, the 'Clubman' layout of 3.408 km was used.

== List of winners ==
Year	Drivers	Car	Laps	Distance	Circuit Configuration
1994	(Japan) Masahiro Hasemi (Japan) Yukihiro Hane (Japan) Hideo Fukuyama	Nissan Skyline GT-R	946	3216.4 km	Clubman
1995	(Japan) Kunimitsu Takahashi (Japan) Keiichi Tsuchiya (Japan) Akira Iida	Honda NSX	623	3177.3 km	Grand Prix
1996	(Japan) Yoji Yamada (Japan) Eiichi Tajima (Japan) Hideki Okada (Japan) Kazuo Mogi	Porsche 993	595	3034.5 km	Grand Prix
1997	(Japan) Tetsuya Tanaka (Japan) Aguri Suzuki (Japan) Masahiko Kageyama	Nissan Skyline GT-R	607	3095.7 km	Grand Prix
1998	(Japan) Minoru Tanaka (Japan) Eiichi Tajima (Japan) Yuji Tachikawa	Toyota Supra	586	2988.6 km	Grand Prix
1999	(Japan) Hironori Takeuchi (Japan) Tetsuya Tanaka (Japan) Masahiko Kondo	Nissan Skyline GT-R	591	3014.1 km	Grand Prix
2000	(Japan) Mitsuhiro Kinoshita (Japan) Takeshi Tsuchiya (Japan) Seiji Ara (Japan) Yuji Tachikawa	Toyota Supra	605	3085.5 km	Grand Prix
2001	(Japan) Noboyuki Oyagi (Japan) Takayuki Aoki (Japan) Hisashi Yokoshima	Nissan Skyline GT-R	603	3075.3 km	Grand Prix
2002	(Japan) Akira Hirakawa (Japan) Toshihide Hashimura (Japan) Kiichi Takahashi (Japan) Shigemitsu Haga	Porsche 911 (996) GT3	465	2361.3 km	Grand Prix
2003	(Japan) Hironori Takeuchi (Japan) Tetsuya Tanaka (Japan) Masami Kageyama	Porsche 911 (996) GT3	949	3226.6 km	Clubman
2004	(Japan) Hironori Takeuchi (Japan) Tetsuya Tanaka (Japan) Seiji Ara	Porsche 911 (996) GT3	947	3219.8 km	Clubman
2005	(Japan) Manabu Orido (Japan) Nobuteru Taniguchi (Germany) Dominik Schwager	Porsche 911 (996) GT3	957	3253.8 km	Clubman
2006	(Japan) Tetsuya Tanaka (Japan) Morio Nitta (Japan) Shinichi Takagi	Porsche 911 (996) GT3	956	3250.4 km	Clubman
2007	(Japan) Akira Iida (Japan) Takayuki Kinoshita (Japan) Tatsuya Kataoka (Portugal) André Couto	Toyota Supra HV-R	616	3141.6 km	Grand Prix
2008	(Japan) Tatsuya Kataoka (Japan) Masataka Yanagida (Malaysia) Fariqe Hairuman	BMW Z4M	637	3243.2 km	Grand Prix
