= Katsutomo Kaneishi =

Japanese racing driver (born 1968)

- Nationality: (Japan) Japanese
- Born: November 21, 1968 (age 57) Osaka Prefecture (Japan)
- Relatives: Toshihiro Kaneishi (cousin)

Katsutomo Kaneishi (金石 勝智, Kaneishi Katsutomo; born November 21, 1968 in Osaka Prefecture, Japan) is a Japanese racing driver. He has competed in such series as the Japanese Touring Car Championship, Deutsche Tourenwagen Masters and Formula Nippon. He currently serves as the owner and manager of Super GT team Real Racing, which he formed in 2007 to compete in the GT500 class.

== Racing record ==
=== Complete Japanese Formula 3 results ===
(key) (Races in bold indicate pole position) (Races in italics indicate fastest lap)

Year	Team	Engine	1	2	3	4	5	6	7	8	9	10	11	DC	Pts
1988	Funaki Racing	Toyota	SUZ	TSU	FUJ	SUZ	SUG	TSU; DNS	SEN; 8	SUZ; 7	MIN; 10	SUZ; 8		NC	0
1989	Le Garage Kox Racing Team	Mugen	SUZ; 7	FUJ; 3	SUZ; 3	SEN; C	TSU; 8	SUG; 21	TSU; 12	SUZ; 3	MIN; 2	SUZ; Ret		4th	18
1991	Cabin Racing Team with Impul	Mugen	SUZ; 8	FUJ; C	FUJ; Ret	SUZ; 12	TSU; 4	SEN; 5	MIN; 5	TSU; Ret	SUG; 2	SUZ; 1	**SUZ**; 1	**2nd**	**31**

=== Complete Japanese Formula 3000 Championship/Formula Nippon results ===
(key) (Races in bold indicate pole position) (Races in italics indicate fastest lap)

Year	Entrant	1	2	3	4	5	6	7	8	9	10	11	DC	Points
1990	Mola C2 Racing Team	SUZ; Ret	FUJ; 12	MIN; 10	SUZ; DNQ	SUG; 15	FUJ; 18	FUJ; 9	SUZ; DNQ	FUJ; Ret	SUZ; DNQ		26th	0
1991	Zoom Racing Team	SUZ	AUT; 22	FUJ; DNQ	MIN	SUZ; Ret	SUG; DNQ	FUJ; 22	SUZ; 18	FUJ; C	SUZ	FUJ; DNQ	37th	0
1992	Team Nova	SUZ; Ret	FUJ; Ret	MIN	SUZ	AUT	SUG	FUJ; Ret	FUJ; Ret	SUZ	FUJ	SUZ	NC	0
1993	Cabin Racing Team w/ Heroes	SUZ	SUZ	MIN	SUZ	AUT; C	SUG	FUJ; C	FUJ	SUZ	FUJ; 8	SUZ; 6	18th	1
1994	Cabin Racing Team w/ Heroes	SUZ; 5	FUJ; 8	MIN; 12	SUZ; Ret	SUG; 7	FUJ; Ret	SUZ; 13	FUJ; 6	FUJ; 8	SUZ; Ret		12th	3
1995	Heroes Racing Corporation	SUZ; Ret	FUJ; C	MIN; Ret	SUZ; 5	SUG; 7	FUJ; 13	TOK; 4	FUJ; 4	SUZ; Ret			10th	8
1996	Funai Super Aguri	SUZ; 6	MIN; Ret	FUJ; 4	TOK; 5	SUZ; 7	SUG; Ret	FUJ; 4	MIN; Ret	SUZ; Ret	FUJ; 1		7th	19
1997	Funai Super Aguri	SUZ; 7	MIN; Ret	FUJ; Ret	SUZ; 10	SUG; Ret	FUJ; 18	MIN; 8	MOT; Ret	**FUJ**; 1	SUZ; Ret		9th	10
1998	Autobacs Racing Team Aguri	SUZ; 4	MIN; 5	FUJ; 2	MOT; Ret	SUZ; Ret	SUG; 7	FUJ; C	MIN; 5	FUJ; 10	SUZ; Ret		7th	13
1999	Autobacs Racing Team Aguri	SUZ; 9	MOT; Ret	MIN; Ret	FUJ; 11	SUZ; Ret	SUG; 8	FUJ; 6	MIN; Ret	MOT; Ret	SUZ; 7		16th	1
2000	Autobacs Racing Team Aguri	SUZ; 4	MOT; 6	MIN; 5	FUJ; 3	SUZ; Ret	SUG; 3	MOT; 11	FUJ; Ret	MIN	SUZ		6th	14
2001	Olympic Kondo Racing Team	SUZ; 7	MOT; 6	MIN; Ret	FUJ; 4	SUZ; Ret	SUG; 9	FUJ; 11	MIN; Ret	MOT; 11	SUZ; 13		13th	4
2002	Olympic Kondo Racing Team	SUZ; 12	FUJ; Ret	MIN; 8	SUZ; 12	MOT; Ret	SUG; 11	FUJ; 10	MIN; 12	MOT; 14	SUZ; 9		18th	0

=== Complete Japanese Touring Car Championship (1994-) results ===
(key) (Races in bold indicate pole position) (Races in italics indicate fastest lap)

Year	Team	Car	1	2	3	4	5	6	7	8	9	10	11	12	13	14	15	16	17	18	DC	Pts
1994	Team Tanabe	Mazda Lantis	AUT; 1	AUT; 2	SUG; 1	SUG; 2	TOK; 1	TOK; 2	SUZ; 1	SUZ; 2	MIN; 1	MIN; 2	AID; 1	AID; 2	TSU; 1	TSU; 2	SEN; 1; 19	SEN; 2; 17	FUJ; 1; 18	FUJ; 2; 19	NC	0
1995	Racing Project Bandoh	Toyota Sprinter Marino	FUJ; 1; 12	FUJ; 2; 9																	25th	3
1995	Racing Project Bandoh	Toyota Corona EXiV			SUG; 1; 19	SUG; 2 Ret	TOK; 1; 12	TOK; 2; 10	SUZ; 1; 20	SUZ; 2 Ret	MIN; 1; 15	MIN; 2 Ret	AID; 1; 12	AID; 2; 19	SEN; 1; 13	SEN; 2 Ret	FUJ; 1; 11	FUJ; 2; 27			25th	3
1996	Racing Project Bandoh	Toyota Corona EXiV	FUJ; 1; 6	FUJ; 2; 5	SUG; 1; 14	SUG; 2 Ret	SUZ; 1; 6	SUZ; 2; 8	MIN; 1; 10	MIN; 2; 12	SEN; 1; 13	SEN; 2 Ret	TOK; 1 NC	TOK; 2; 9	FUJ; 1; 6	FUJ; 2; 5					12th	33
1997	Racing Project Bandoh	Toyota Corona EXiV	FUJ; 1 C	FUJ; 2 C	AID; 1 Ret	AID; 2; 10	SUG; 1 Ret	SUG; 2; 7	SUZ; 1; 11	SUZ; 2; 10	MIN; 1; 3	MIN; 2; 14	SEN; 1 Ret	SEN; 2; 5	TOK; 1; 4	TOK; 2; 5	FUJ; 1; 3	FUJ; 2; 3			7th	52
1998	Racing Project Bandoh	Toyota Corona EXiV	FUJ; 1 Ret	FUJ; 2; 1	MOT; 6	SUG; 1; 3	SUG; 2 Ret	SUZ; 1; 1	SUZ; 2; 2	MIN; 1; 3	MIN; 1; 2	AID; Ret	FUJ; 1; 1								**2nd**	**108**

=== Complete JGTC/Super GT Results ===
(key) (Races in bold indicate pole position) (Races in italics indicate fastest lap)

Year	Team	Car	Class	1	2	3	4	5	6	7	8	9	DC	Pts
1997	Toyota Castrol Team	Toyota Supra	GT500	SUZ; 7	FUJ; 9	SEN; 4	FUJ; 8	MIN; 5	SUG; 10				10th	21
1998	mugen×Dome	Honda NSX	GT500	SUZ; Ret	FUJ; C	SEN; Ret	FUJ; 4	MOT; Ret	MIN; 15	SUG; DSQ			15th	10
1999	mugen×Dome	Honda NSX	GT500	SUZ; 1	FUJ; Ret	SUG; Ret	MIN; 11	FUJ; 2	TAI; 3	MOT; Ret			4th	47
2000	mugen×Dome	Honda NSX	GT500	MOT; Ret	FUJ; 1	SUG; 7	FUJ; 17	TAI; 10	MIN; 2	SUZ; 15			6th	46
2001	Autobacs Racing Team Aguri	Honda NSX	GT500	TAI; 2	FUJ; 6	SUG; 2	FUJ; 12	MOT; 11	SUZ; 1	MIN; Ret			2nd	56
2002	Autobacs Racing Team Aguri	Honda NSX	GT500	TAI; 7	FUJ; 4	SUG; 13	SEP; 6	FUJ; 9	MOT; 8	MIN; 8	SUZ; 2		10th	28
2004	Autobacs Racing Team Aguri	Honda NSX	GT500	TAI; 13	SUG; 9	SEP; 11	TOK; 12	MOT; 11	AUT; 13	SUZ; 11			15th	2
2007	RollingStone Real Racing	Honda NSX	GT500	SUZ; 6	TAI; 10	FUJ; Ret	SEP; 12	SUG; Ret	SUZ; 5	MOT; 7	AUT; Ret	FUJ; 3	14th	29
2008	RollingStone Real Racing	Honda NSX	GT500	SUZ; 8	OKA; 16	FUJ; 10	SEP; 6	SUG; 9	SUZ; Ret	MOT; 15	AUT; 11	FUJ; 10	19th	16
2009	Keihin Real Racing	Honda NSX	GT500	OKA	SUZ	FUJ	SEP	SUG	SUZ; 10	FUJ	AUT	MOT	19th	1

=== Complete Deutsche Tourenwagen Masters results ===
(key) (Races in bold indicate pole position) (Races in italics indicate fastest lap)

Year	Team	Car	1	2	3	4	5	6	7	8	9	10	Pos	Points
2003	Persson Motorsport	AMG-Mercedes CLK-DTM 2002	HOC; 19	ADR; 14	NÜR; 19	LAU; 17	NOR; 17†	DON; Ret	NÜR; 16†	A1R; 17	ZAN; 18	HOC; 16	22nd	0

^{†} - Driver did not finish, but completed 90% of the race distance.
