= Norberto Fontana =

Argentine racing driver (born 1975)

- Born: Norberto Edgardo Fontana; 20 January 1975 (age 51); Arrecifes, Buenos Aires, Argentina

Formula One World Championship career
- Nationality: (Argentina) Argentine
- Active years: 1997
- Team: Sauber
- Entries: 4
- Championships: 0
- Wins: 0
- Podiums: 0
- Career points: 0
- Pole positions: 0
- Fastest laps: 0
- First entry: 1997 French Grand Prix
- Last entry: 1997 European Grand Prix

Norberto Edgardo Fontana (born 20 January 1975) is an Argentine racing driver. He participated in four Formula One Grands Prix, debuting on 29 June 1997 but scoring no championship points.

Fontana's opportunity to race came as a result of two separate injuries sustained by regular Sauber driver Gianni Morbidelli during the 1997 season. During the 1997 European Grand Prix, Fontana had gained attention for apparently blocking Jacques Villeneuve to let rival Michael Schumacher pull away from the Canadian. He attempted to enter with the Tyrrell team for 1998 but was dropped in favour of Brazilian Ricardo Rosset and with Minardi for 2000. In between his time in F1, Fontana raced in Formula Nippon. In 2010, he won the Konex Award as one of the five best Racing Drivers of the last decade in Argentina.

== Early career ==
Fontana was born in Arrecifes, Buenos Aires, as the son of Hector and Clara Fontana. He started racing at the age of eight at the Summer Night Championship in Lujan. In 1989, he began a full season of karting and finished 2nd in the Youth Kart Championship of Buenos Aires Province. The following year, Fontana progressed to a higher level of championship and finished fourth. In 1992, he moved into car racing and competed in the Formula Renault Argentina series before moving into the European series events in 1993.

Fontana raced in the German Formula Three Championship series in 1994 and 1995, winning the 1995 title as well as that year's Marlboro Masters event at Zandvoort circuit. He claimed the title ahead of drivers including Ralf Schumacher, Alexander Wurz, Jarno Trulli and Jan Magnussen.

In 1996, Fontana entered Formula Nippon for the Nova Engineering team driving a Lola T96/51 Mugen. His highlights were finishing second twice in Fuji in a season that included multiple accidents, mechanical failures and poor results. In 1997, he drove for the Le Mans team in their Reynard 97D Mugen. The season started badly but made a comeback to finish fifth in Fuji, a win at Mine and third in Motegi.

== Formula One ==
Fontana joined the Sauber test team in 1995 when Peter Sauber approached him for a test session that took place at Barcelona in late 1994. He retained this role throughout 1995 and 1996.

=== 1997 ===
Fontana made his Formula One debut at the 1997 French Grand Prix, replacing Gianni Morbidelli, who had broken his arm prior to the race. He qualified 20th and retired when he understeered and ended up in a gravel trap. Prior to the British GP, team principal Peter Sauber looked for replacements to take Fontana's seat but eventually decided to keep Fontana on board. During qualifying, he missed a red light, indicating that the car must come in for a mandatory weight check. Fontana drove past the light and was forced to start at the back of the grid. In the race, Fontana finished ninth despite his right leg becoming numb. At Hockenheim, he started 18th and finished ninth despite spinning early on.

At the 1997 European Grand Prix in Jerez, Fontana received a $5,000 fine for speeding in the pit lane and eventually qualified 18th. During the race, Fontana appeared to block Jacques Villeneuve, who was the direct rival of Ferrari driver Michael Schumacher at the time. ITV commentator Martin Brundle pointed out that the Sauber team used Ferrari engines at the time. Fontana eventually finished 14th with his highlight being overtaking Jos Verstappen with two wheels on the grass.

=== Attempted comebacks ===
Fontana was considered as a driver for the dying Tyrrell team for 1998, with team principal Ken Tyrrell negotiating with the Argentine. Fontana signed a draft contract, but did not sign the final contract as the owners, British American Tobacco, had vetoed the suggestion, and Tyrrell was forced to sign Brazilian Ricardo Rosset, who had more sponsorship brought to the team. In 1999, Fontana tested with Minardi for a seat that would partner Marc Gené. However, sponsorship once again caused the Argentine to lose the seat for a possible comeback.

== Post-Formula One ==
Fontana decided to return to Formula Nippon and finished fourth in the series, which included a win in Fuji. He also competed in the Japanese GT Championship and was paired with Masanori Sekiya. The pair finished sixth in Suzuka, third at Sendai and Motegi. The pair finished seventh in the championship.

=== Touring car racing ===
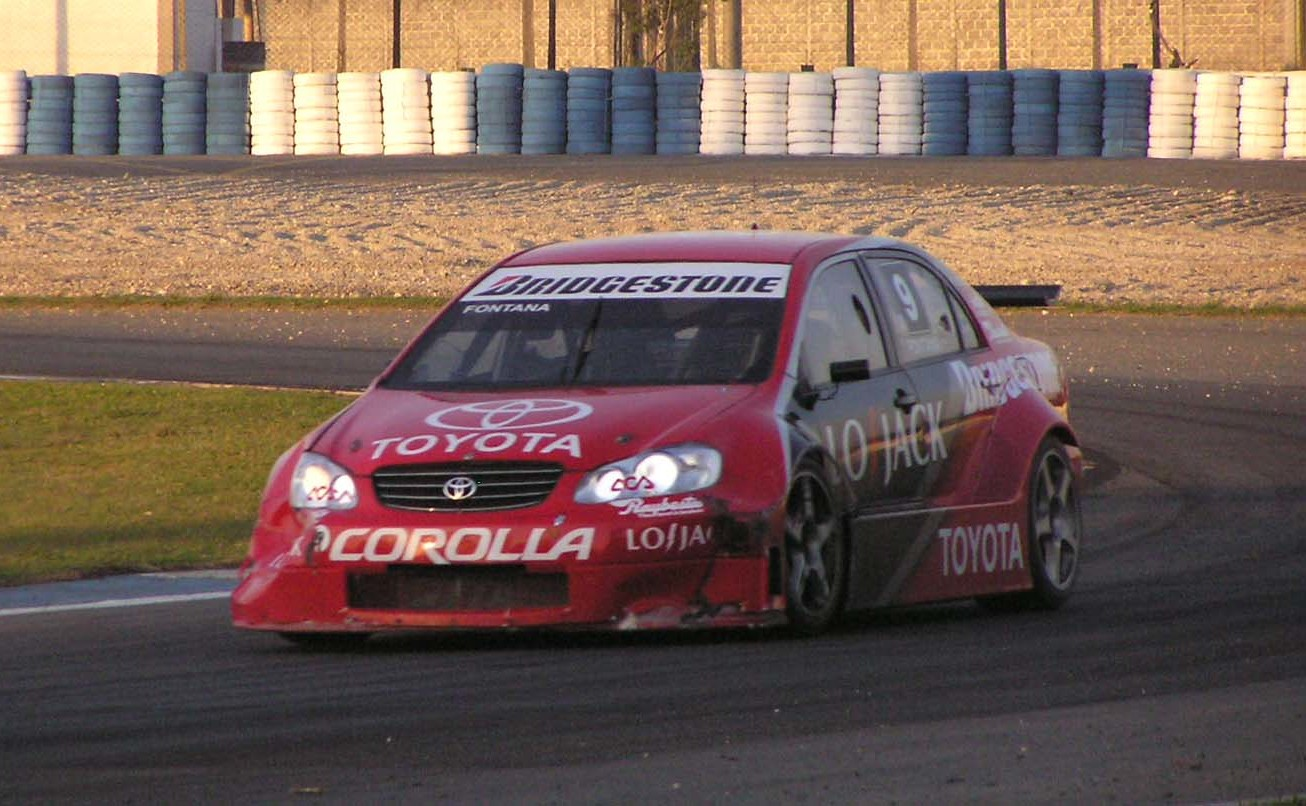
Fontana driving a Toyota Corolla in the TC2000 Championship.

Fontana subsequently moved into Argentine touring car racing, driving in the Turismo Carretera, TC2000 and Top Race V6. In the TC2000, he was champion in 2002 (with Toyota) and 2010 (with Ford), and third in 2004 and 2014. In 2006, he was the Turismo Carretera champion. Until 2009, he drove for Toyota, given the relationship he had with the brand when he raced in Japan.

In 2022, at the age of 49, Fontana joined TCR South America.

Fontana also competed at the 2011 Dakar Rally in a buggy.

== Racing record ==
=== Complete German Formula Three results ===
(key) (Races in bold indicate pole position) (Races in italics indicate fastest lap)

Year	Entrant	Engine	Class	1	2	3	4	5	6	7	8	9	10	11	12	13	14	15	16	17	18	19	20	DC	Pts
1994	KMS	Opel	A	ZOL; 1 C	ZOL; 2; 15	HOC; 1; 11	HOC; 2; 8	NÜR; 1 Ret	NÜR; 2; 9	WUN; 1; 1	**WUN**; **2**; 8	NOR; 1; 5	NOR; 2; 20	DIE; 1 Ret	DIE; 2; 13	**NÜR**; **1**; 1	**NÜR**; **2**; 1	AVU; 1; 3	AVU; 2; 2	ALE; 1 Ret	ALE; 2 DNS	HOC; 1; 2	HOC; 2 Ret	6th	118
1995	KMS	Opel	A	**HOC**; **1**; 1	**HOC**; **2**; 1	**AVU**; **1**; 1	**AVU**; **2**; 1	NOR; 1; 3	NOR; 2; 4	DIE; 1; 3	DIE; 2; 3	**NÜR**; **1**; 1	**NÜR**; **2**; 1	ALE; 1; 1	**ALE**; **2**; 1	**MAG**; **1**; 1	**MAG**; **2**; 1	**HOC**; **1**; 4	HOC; 2; 20					1st	256

=== Complete Formula Nippon results ===
(key) (Races in bold indicate pole position) (Races in italics indicate fastest lap)

Year	Entrant	1	2	3	4	5	6	7	8	9	10	DC	Points
1996	Shionogi Team Nova	SUZ; 14	MIN; 2	FUJ; 1	TOK; Ret	SUZ; 8	SUG; Ret	FUJ; 2	MIN; Ret	SUZ; 11	FUJ; Ret	5th	22
1997	Team LeMans	SUZ; 9	MIN; 8	FUJ; 6	SUZ; Ret	SUG; 7	FUJ; 2	MIN; 1	MOT; 3	**FUJ**; Ret	SUZ; Ret	**3rd**	**21**
1998	LEMONed Racing Team LeMans	SUZ; 3	MIN; Ret	**FUJ**; 6	**MOT**; Ret	SUZ; Ret	SUG; Ret	FUJ; C	MIN; 2	FUJ; 1	SUZ; 8	4th	21

=== Complete International Formula 3000 results ===
(key) (Races in bold indicate pole position) (Races in italics indicate fastest lap)

Year	Entrant	1	2	3	4	5	6	7	8	9	10	11	12	DC	Points
1996	Edenbridge Racing	NÜR	PAU	PER	HOC	SIL	SPA	MAG	EST; Ret	MUG	HOC			NC	0
1999	Fortec Motorsport	IMO; Ret	MON; 5	CAT; Ret	MAG; Ret	SIL; 5	A1R; 8	HOC; Ret	HUN; Ret	SPA; 14	NÜR; 10			15th	4
2001	F3000 Prost Junior Team	INT	IMO	CAT	A1R	MON	NÜR	MAG	SIL	HOC	HUN; 14	SPA; Ret	MNZ; Ret	32nd	0

=== Complete Formula One results ===
(key)

Year	Entrant	Chassis	Engine	1	2	3	4	5	6	7	8	9	10	11	12	13	14	15	16	17	WDC	Points
1997	Red Bull Sauber Petronas	Sauber C16	Petronas V10	AUS	BRA	ARG	SMR	MON	ESP	CAN	FRA; Ret	GBR; 9	GER; 9	HUN	BEL	ITA	AUT	LUX	JPN	EUR; 14	NC	0

=== Complete JGTC results ===
(key) (Races in bold indicate pole position) (Races in italics indicate fastest lap)

Year	Team	Car	Class	1	2	3	4	5	6	7	DC	Pts
1998	Toyota Castrol Team	Toyota Supra	GT500	SUZ; 6	FUJ; C	SEN; 3	FUJ; 8	MOT; 3	MIN; 16	SUG; Ret	7th	33

=== Complete CART results ===
(key)

Year	Team	No.	1	2	3	4	5	6	7	8	9	10	11	12	13	14	15	16	17	18	19	20	Rank	Points	Ref
2000	Della Penna	10	MIA; 15	LBH; 15	RIO; 23	MOT; DNS	NZR; 20	MIL; Wth	DET; 14	POR; 21	CLE; 11	TOR; 20	MIS	CHI	MOH	ROA	VAN	LS	STL	HOU	SRF	FON	**28th**	**2**	

=== Complete TCR World Tour results ===
(key)

Year	Team	Car	1	2	3	4	5	6	7	8	9	10	11	12	13	14	DC	Points
2024	Cobra Racing Team	Toyota GR Corolla Sport TCR	VAL; 1	VAL; 2	MRK; 1	MRK; 2	MOH; 1	MOH; 2	SAP; 1; 19	SAP; 2; 16	ELP; 1 Ret	ELP; 2; 12	ZHZ; 1	ZHZ; 2	MAC; 1	MAC; 2	37th	4

Sporting positions
Preceded by Gareth Rees	Masters of Formula 3 Winner; 1995	Succeeded by Kurt Mollekens
Preceded by Jörg Müller	German Formula Three champion 1995	Succeeded by Jarno Trulli
Preceded by Gabriel Ponce de León	TC 2000 Championship; Champion; 2002	Succeeded by Gabriel Ponce de León
Preceded by Juan Manuel Silva	Turismo Carretera; Champion; 2006	Succeeded by Christian Ledesma
Preceded by José María López; Anthony Reid	Winner of the 200 km de Buenos Aires; 2009; With: Ricardo Mauricio	Succeeded by Bernardo Llaver; Mauro Giallombardo
Preceded by José María López	TC 2000 Championship; Champion; 2010	Succeeded by Matías Rossi
