= Tetsuji Tamanaka =

Japanese racing driver

Tetsuji Tamanaka (玉中 哲二, Tamanaka Tetsuji; born May 13, 1962) is a professional race car driver.

== Complete Formula Nippon results ==
(key) (Races in bold indicate pole position) (Races in italics indicate fastest lap)

Year	Team	1	2	3	4	5	6	7	8	9	10	DC	Pts
1996	Asahi Kiko Sports	SUZ; 17	MIN; Ret	FSW; Ret	TOK; Ret	SUZ; Ret	SUG; Ret	FSW; Ret	MIN; 15	SUZ; Ret	FSW; NC	NC	0
1997	Takagi B-1 Racing Team	SUZ; 13	MIN; Ret	FSW; 13	SUZ; 16	SUG; Ret	FSW; Ret	MIN; Ret	TRM; Ret	FSW; DNQ	SUZ; DNQ	NC	0
1998	Takagi B-1 Racing Team	SUZ; Ret	MIN; 11	FSW; 14	TRM; 13	SUZ; Ret	SUG; Ret	FSW; C	MIN; 8	FSW; Ret	SUZ; 17	NC	0
1999	Takagi B-1 Racing Team	SUZ; Ret	TRM	MIN; 14	FSW; 19	SUZ; 14	SUG; Ret	FSW; Ret	MIN; 10	TRM; Ret	SUZ; 17	NC	0
2000	Takagi B-1 Racing Team	SUZ; Ret	TRM; Ret	MIN; 10	FSW; 10	SUZ; 15	SUG; 10	TRM; Ret	FSW; Ret	MIN; 14	SUZ; Ret	NC	0
2001	Takagi B-1 Racing Team	SUZ; 15	TRM; Ret	MIN; 14	FSW; 8	SUZ; Ret	SUG; 15	FSW; 15	MIN; 7	TRM; 15	SUZ; Ret	NC	0
