= Juichi Wakisaka =

Japanese racing driver (born 1972)

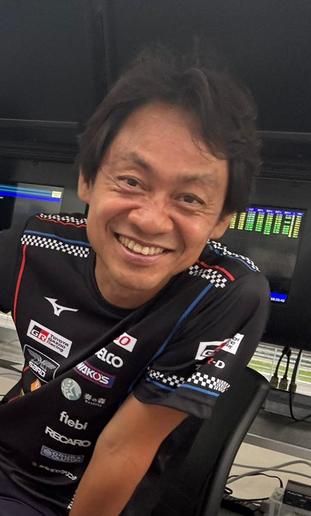
- Wakisaka at Super GT Malaysia Round in 2025
- Nationality: (Japan) Japanese
- Born: July 29, 1972 (age 54) Nara, Japan
- Relatives: Shigekazu Wakisaka (brother)

Super GT career
- Debut season: 1998
- Former teams: Lexus Team Kraft; Lexus Team TOM'S; Lexus Team SARD; Toyota Team LeMans; Mugen x Dome Project; Lexus Team WedsSport Bandoh
- Starts: 97
- Wins: 10
- Best finish: 1st in 2002, 2006, 2009

Previous series
- 1997-2004 1995-1996: Formula Nippon; All-Japan Formula Three

Championship titles
- 2002, 2006, 2009: 3

Awards
- 1996: All-Japan F3 champion

Juichi Wakisaka (脇阪寿一, Wakisaka Juichi; born July 29, 1972 in Nara) is a Japanese former racing driver who was a 2002, 2006 and 2009 champion in Japan's Super GT series in the GT500 category. Prior to the 1998 Formula One season he tested for the Jordan Grand Prix team. In 2002, Wakisaka raced the Toyota Supra GT with Akira Iida, in 2006 and 2009 Wakisaka raced the Lexus SC 430 with André Lotterer. He retired from driving after the conclusion of the 2015 Super GT Series season, becoming the team director of Lexus Team LeMans Wako's.

Wakisaka was also a regular presenter of Best Motoring and is brother to Shigekazu, who also competes in Super GT.

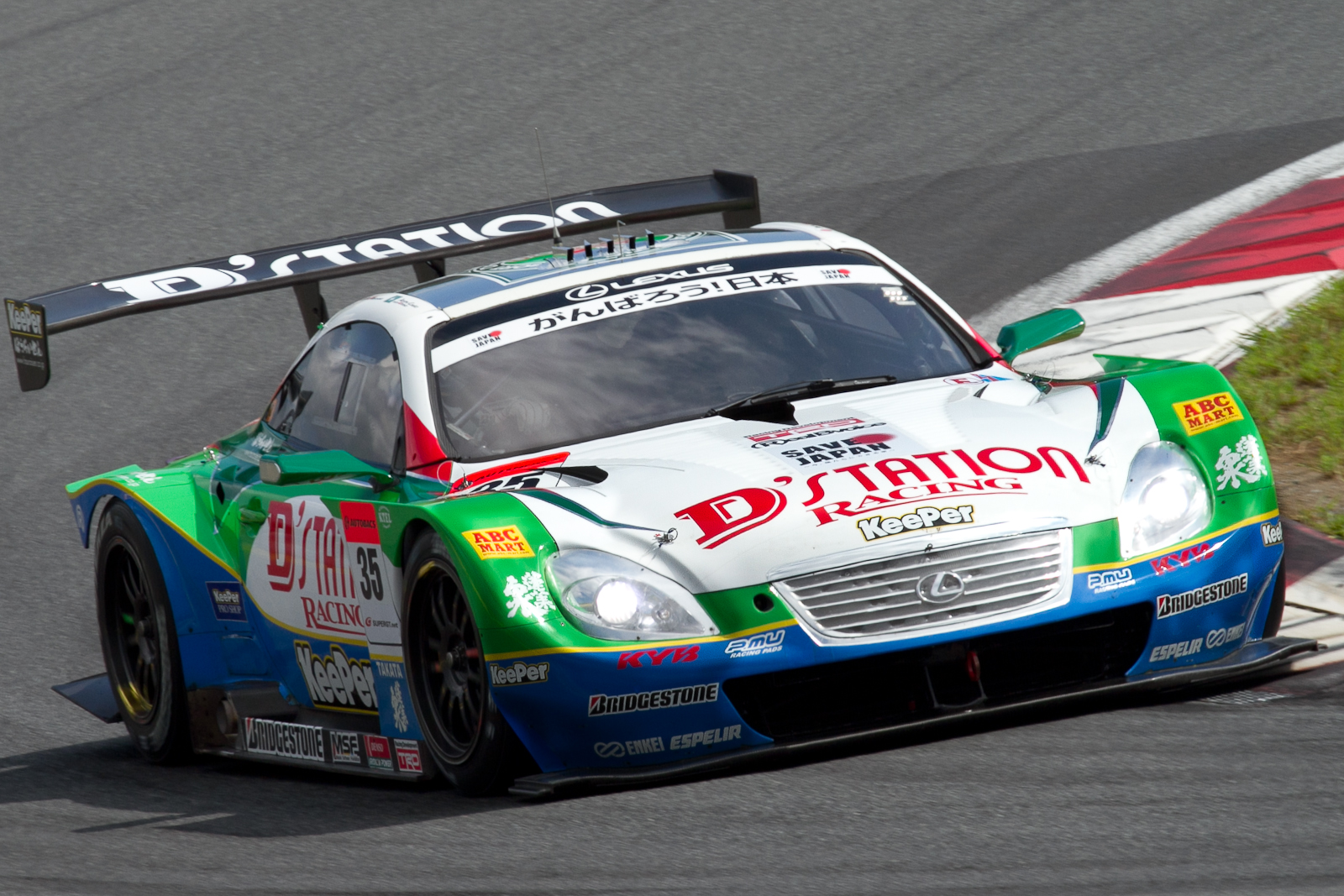
Wakisaka driving the Lexus SC430 GT500 for Kraft Racing in 2011

== Media Appearances ==
Wakisaka made a guest appearance in Downtown no Gaki no Tsukai ya Arahende!!, driving a Lexus LFA around Fuji Speedway for the 2013 No-Laughing Earth Defence Force Batsu Game

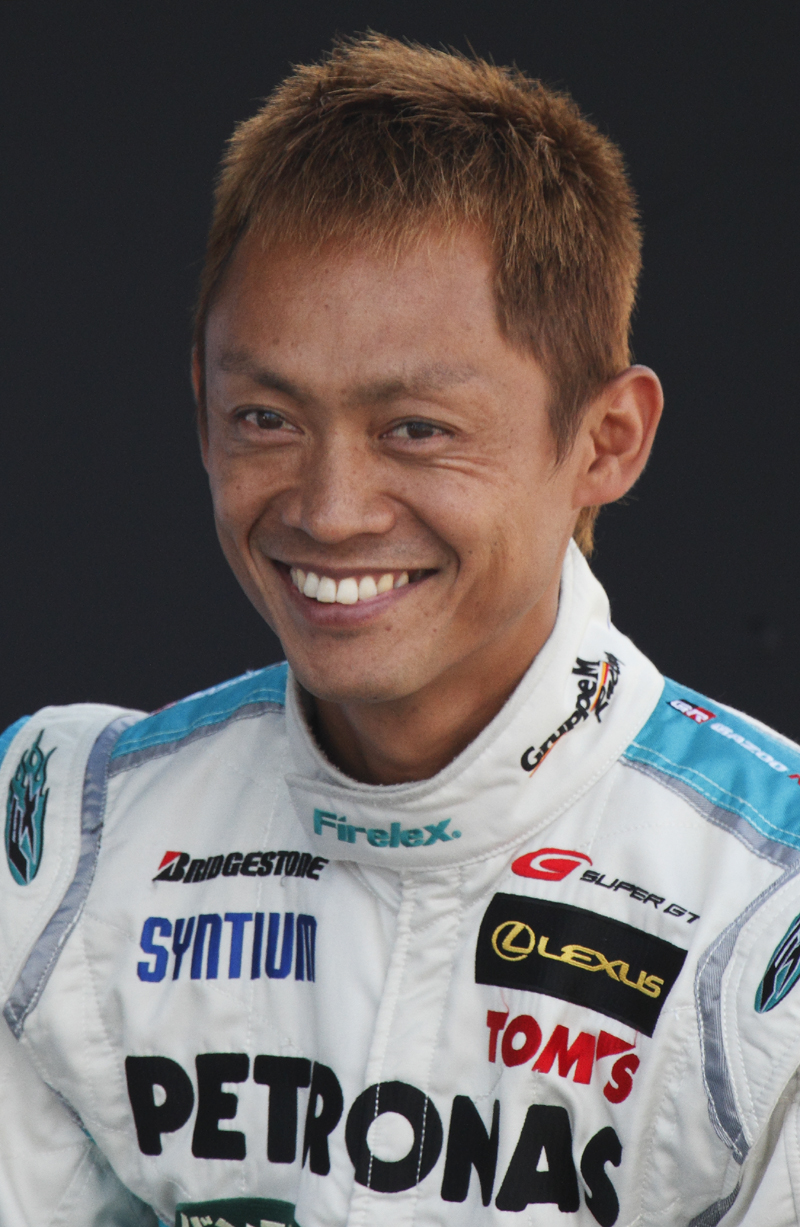
Wakisaka in 2010

== Racing record ==
=== Complete JGTC/Super GT results ===
(key) (Races in bold indicate pole position) (Races in italics indicate fastest lap)

Year	Team	Car	Class	1	2	3	4	5	6	7	8	9	DC	Pts
1998	Mugen x Dome Project	Honda NSX	GT500	SUZ	FUJ	SEN	FUJ	MOT	MIN; 15	SUG; DSQ			NC	0
1999	Mugen x Dome Project	Honda NSX	GT500	**SUZ**; 1	FUJ; Ret	SUG; Ret	MIN; 11	FUJ; 2	TAI; 3	MOT; Ret			4th	47
2000	Mugen x Dome Project	Honda NSX	GT500	**MOT**; Ret	**FUJ**; 1	**SUG**; 7	FUJ; 17	TAI; 10	**MIN**; 2	SUZ; 15			6th	46
2001	Toyota Team LeMans	Toyota Supra	GT500	TAI; Ret	**FUJ**; 1	SUG; 5	FUJ; 3	MOT; 13	SUZ; Ret	MIN; 14			7th	40
2002	Toyota Team LeMans	Toyota Supra	GT500	TAI; 10	**FUJ**; 2	SUG; 1	SEP; 11	FUJ; 7	MOT; 4	MIN; 4	**SUZ**; 3		**1st**	**75**
2003	Toyota Team LeMans	Toyota Supra	GT500	TAI; 1	FUJ; 12	**SUG**; 1	FUJ; 6	FUJ; 4	MOT; 4	AUT; 4	SUZ; 7		**2nd**	**83**
2004	Toyota Team LeMans	Toyota Supra	GT500	TAI; 2	**SUG**; 11	SEP; 14	TOK; 2	MOT; 2	AUT; 4	SUZ; Ret			**3rd**	**57**
2005	Toyota Team LeMans	Toyota Supra	GT500	OKA; 11	FUJ; 5	SEP; 4	SUG; 4	MOT; 9	FUJ; 3	AUT; 10	SUZ; 3		6th	51
2006	Toyota Team TOM'S	Lexus SC430	GT500	SUZ; 1	OKA; 8	FUJ; 3	SEP; 15	SUG; 4	SUZ; 10	MOT; 2	AUT; 7	FUJ; 4	**1st**	**80**
2007	Toyota Team TOM'S	Lexus SC430	GT500	SUZ; 7	OKA; 5	FUJ; DNS	SEP; 8	SUG; 5	SUZ; 1	MOT; 6	AUT; 6	FUJ; 6	6th	54
2008	Toyota Team TOM'S	Lexus SC430	GT500	SUZ; 3	OKA; 4	FUJ; 2	SEP; 7	SUG; 10	SUZ; 3	MOT; 3	AUT; 8	FUJ; 7	**3rd**	**63**
2009	Lexus Team TOM'S	Lexus SC430	GT500	OKA; 11	SUZ; 2	FUJ; 2	SEP; 6	SUG; 7	SUZ; 8	FUJ; 3	AUT; 1	MOT; 2	**1st**	**88**
2010	Lexus Team TOM'S	Lexus SC430	GT500	SUZ; 4	OKA; 3	FUJ; 2	SEP; 8	SUG; 7	SUZ; 10	FUJ; C	MOT; 1		**2nd**	**62**
2011	Lexus Team Kraft	Lexus SC430	GT500	OKA; 14	FUJ; 11	SEP; 10	SUG; Ret	SUZ; 7	FUJ; 9	AUT; 9	MOT; 14		15th	7
2012	Lexus Team SARD	Lexus SC430	GT500	OKA; 9	FUJ; 1	SEP; 4	SUG; 4	SUZ; Ret	FUJ; 6	AUT; 5	MOT; 4		**3rd**	**57**
2013	Lexus Team SARD	Lexus SC430	GT500	OKA; 8	FUJ; 4	SEP; 2	SUG; 4	SUZ; 9	FUJ; 11	AUT; 7	MOT; 4		8th	47
2014	Lexus Team WedsSport Bandoh	Lexus RC F	GT500	OKA; 11	FUJ; 7	AUT; 8	SUG; 12	FUJ; 11	SUZ; Ret	BUR; 6	MOT; 6		15th	17
2015	Lexus Team WedsSport Bandoh	Lexus RC F	GT500	OKA; 10	FUJ; 7	CHA; 9	FUJ; 10	SUZ; 4	SUG; 5	AUT; 9	MOT; 10		11th	27

=== Complete Formula Nippon results ===
(key) (Races in bold indicate pole position) (Races in italics indicate fastest lap)

Year	Team	1	2	3	4	5	6	7	8	9	10	DC	Pts
1997	Team Anabuki Dome with Mugen	SUZ; 12	MIN; 6	FUJ; Ret	SUZ; Ret	SUG; Ret	FUJ; 7	MIN; 11	MOT; 4	FUJ; Ret	SUZ; Ret	14th	4
1998	Autobacs Racing Team Aguri	SUZ; Ret	**MIN**; 2	FUJ; Ret	MOT; 1	SUZ; 4	SUG; Ret	MIN; Ret	FUJ; Ret	SUZ; 2		**3rd**	**25**
1999	Autobacs Racing Team Aguri	SUZ; Ret	MOT; 15	MIN; 10	FUJ; Ret	SUZ; 9	SUG; 5	FUJ; 2	MIN; 3	MOT; 11	SUZ; 3	7th	16
2000	Autobacs Racing Team Aguri	SUZ; 11	MOT; 5	MIN; 4	FUJ; 2	SUZ; 8	SUG; Ret	MOT; 9	FUJ; Ret	MIN; 6	SUZ; 6	7th	13
2001	Autobacs Racing Team Aguri	SUZ; 2	MOT; 10	MIN; 12	FUJ; 14	SUZ; 6	**SUG**; 2	**FUJ**; 1	MIN; DSQ	MOT; 16	SUZ; Ret	5th	23
2002	Autobacs Racing Team Aguri	SUZ; 5	FUJ; 3	MIN; Ret	SUZ; 3	**MOT**; 3	SUG; Ret	FUJ; 1	MIN; 8	**MOT**; 2	**SUZ**; 4	**3rd**	**33**
2003	TEAM 22	SUZ; 18	FUJ; 5	MIN; Ret	**MOT**; 1	SUZ; 3	SUG; 3	FUJ; Ret	MIN; 6	MOT; Ret	SUZ; 1	**3rd**	**31**
2004	Team LeMans	SUZ; 13	SUG; 3	MOT; Ret	SUZ; 5	SUG; 3	MIN; 2	SEP; 3	**MOT**; Ret	SUZ; 4		5th	23

=== Complete Japanese Formula 3 results ===
(key) (Races in bold indicate pole position) (Races in italics indicate fastest lap)

Year	Team	Engine	1	2	3	4	5	6	7	8	9	10	DC	Pts
1995	Toda Racing	Mugen	SUZ; 9	FUJ; C	TSU; 8	MIN; 15	SUZ; 4	TAI; 9	SUG; 13	FUJ; 2	SUZ; 6	SEN; 9	6th	10
1996	Team Anabuki Dome	Mugen	SUZ; 1	TSU; 1	MIN; 4	FUJ; 3	SUZ; 1	SUG; 6	SEN; 1	SUZ; 3	FUJ; C		**1st**	**40**

Sporting positions
Preceded by Pedro de la Rosa	All-Japan Formula Three; Champion; 1996	Succeeded by Tom Coronel
Preceded by Hironori Takeuchi; Yuji Tachikawa	All-Japan Grand Touring Car Champion (GT500); 2002 with: Akira Iida	Succeeded by Satoshi Motoyama; Michael Krumm
Preceded by Yuji Tachikawa; Toranosuke Takagi	Super GT (GT500) Champion; 2006 with: André Lotterer	Succeeded by Daisuke Ito; Ralph Firman
Preceded by Satoshi Motoyama; Benoît Tréluyer	Super GT (GT500) Champion; 2009 with: André Lotterer	Succeeded by Takashi Kogure; Loïc Duval
