= Yuji Tachikawa =

Japanese racing driver (born 1975)

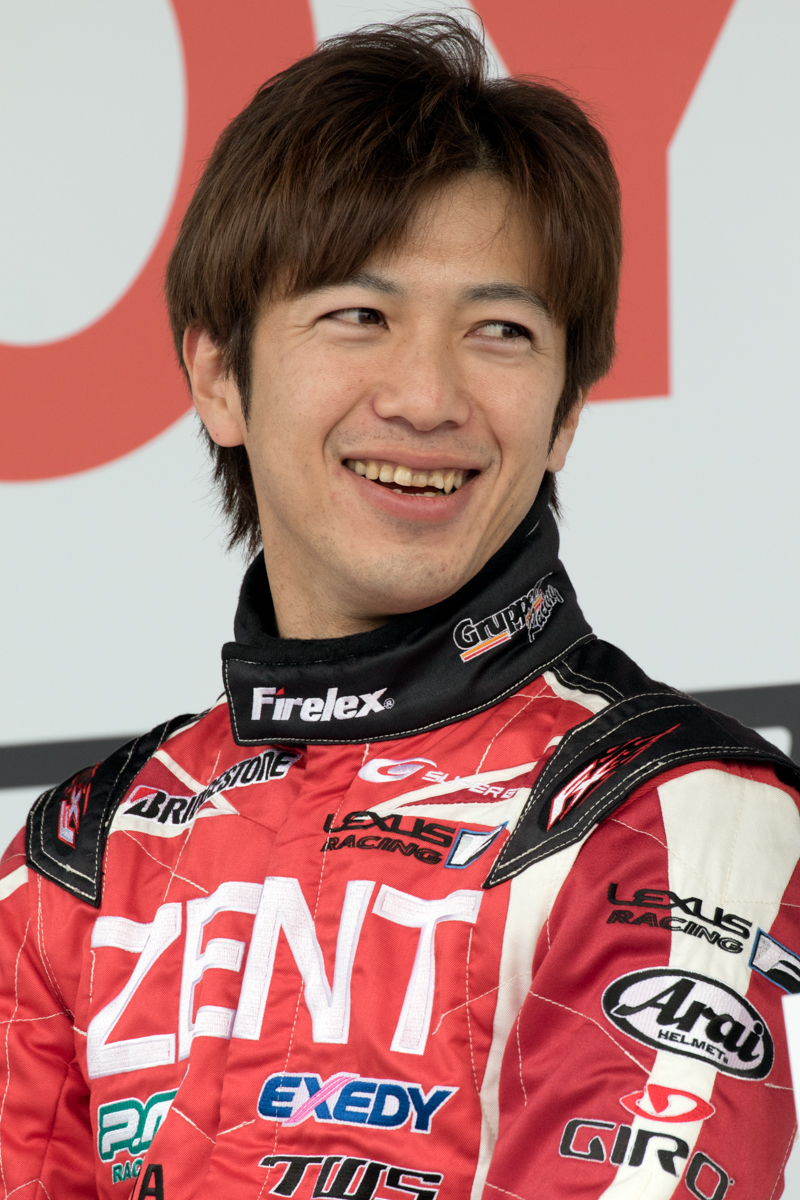
- Tachikawa in 2015
- Nationality: (Japan) Japanese
- Born: 5 July 1975 (age 51) Kamakura, Kanagawa, Japan

Super GT career
- Years active: 1996–2023
- Teams: Team LeMans; Bros Factory; Cerumo
- Starts: 125
- Wins: 19
- Poles: 24
- Fastest laps: 6

Previous series
- 1995–1997 1998 1997-2009: All-Japan F3; JTCC; Formula Nippon

Championship titles
- 2001 2005, 2013: JGTC - GT500; Super GT - GT500

Yuji Tachikawa (立川祐路, Tachikawa Yūji; born 5 July 1975) is a Japanese motorsport executive and former racing driver. He competed in Super GT between 1996 and 2023, and in Formula Nippon between 1997 and 2009. He is a three-time Super GT champion in the GT500 class, having won the championship in its previous guise as the All-Japan Grand Touring Car Championship in 2001, and after its rebranding in 2005 and 2013. A longtime Toyota factory driver, he competed for the Cerumo team for the majority of his racing career.

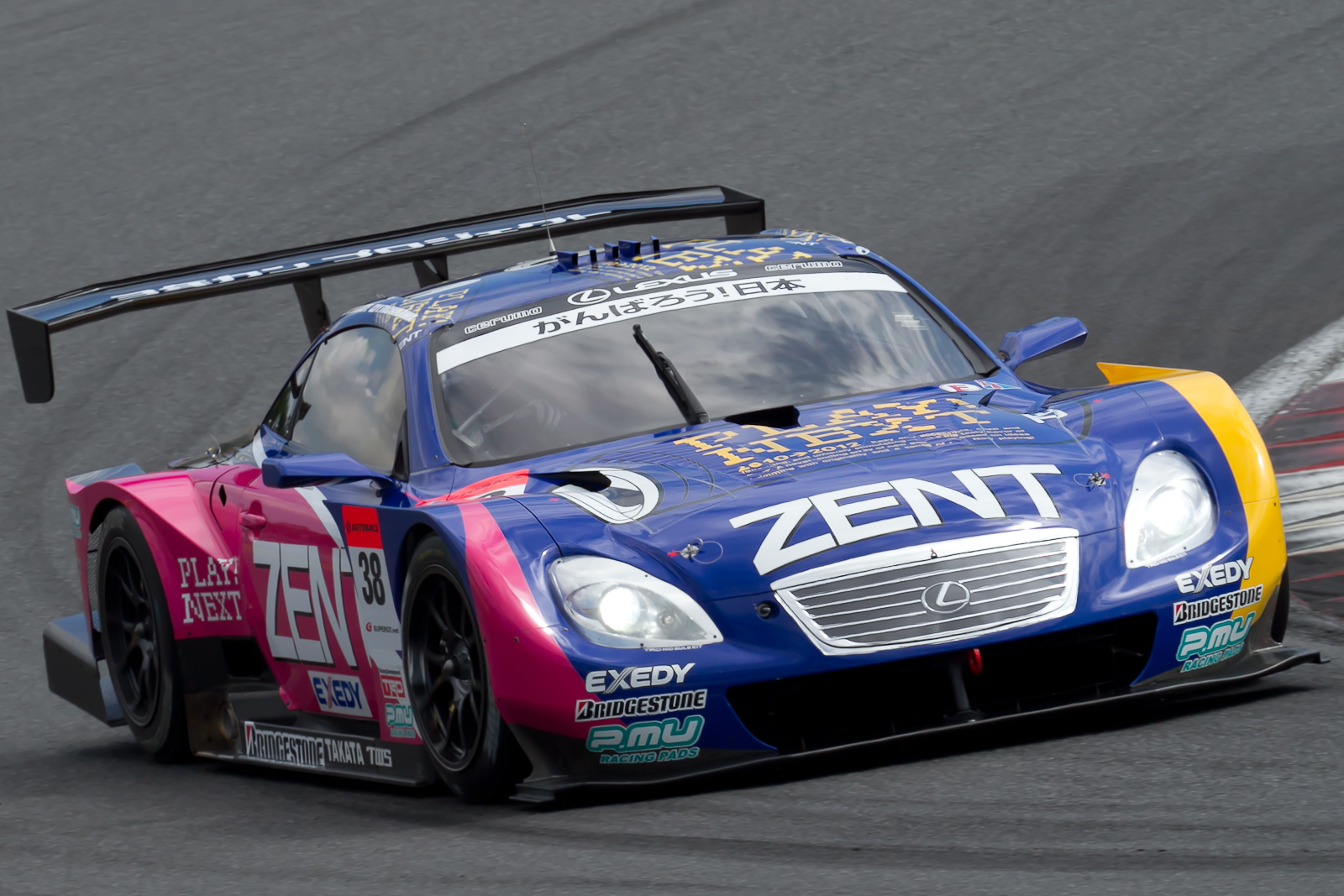
Tachikawa driving the Lexus SC430 GT500 for Cerumo in 2011.

== Racing record ==
=== Complete Japanese Formula 3 results ===
(key) (Races in bold indicate pole position) (Races in italics indicate fastest lap)

Year	Team	Engine	1	2	3	4	5	6	7	8	9	10	DC	Pts
1995	Morisawa Racing	Toyota	SUZ	FUJ; C	TSU; Ret	MIN; 10	SUZ; 7	TAI; 6	SUG; 8	FUJ; 11	SUZ	SEN; 7	8th	1
1996	Morisawa Racing	Toyota	SUZ; Ret	TSU; Ret	MIN	FUJ	SUZ	SUG	SEN	SUZ	FUJ		NC	0
1997	Toda Racing	Mugen	SUZ; 2	TSU; 4	**MIN**; Ret	FUJ; 3	SUZ; 2	SUG; 1	SEN; Ret	MOT; 2	FUJ; C	SUZ; 2	2nd	40

=== Complete JGTC/Super GT results ===
(key) (Races in bold indicate pole position) (Races in italics indicate fastest lap)

Year	Team	Car	Class	1	2	3	4	5	6	7	8	9	DC	Pts
1996	Bros Factory	BMW M3	GT500	SUZ	FUJ; Ret								25th	2
1996	Bros Factory	Nissan 300ZX	GT500			SEN; Ret	FUJ	SUG; Ret	MIN; 9				25th	2
1997	Team LeMans	Nissan 300ZX	GT500	SUZ; 10	FUJ; DNS	SEN	FUJ	MIN	SUG				29th	1
1999	Team Cerumo	Toyota Supra	GT500	SUZ; 7	**FUJ**; 2	SUG; Ret	MIN; 8	FUJ; 6	TAI; 8	MOT; 12			14th	31
2000	Team Cerumo	Toyota Supra	GT500	MOT; 4	FUJ; 3	SUG; 12	**FUJ**; Ret	**TAI**; 1	MIN; 6	SUZ; 11			4th	58
2001	Team Cerumo	Toyota Supra	GT500	TAI; Ret	FUJ; 2	SUG; 3	FUJ; 4	MOT; 2	SUZ; 6	MIN; 16			**1st**	**58**
2002	Team Cerumo	Toyota Supra	GT500	TAI; 4	FUJ; 1	SUG; 16	SEP; 9	**FUJ**; 1	MOT; 13	MIN; 9	SUZ; 6		**3rd**	**65**
2003	Team Cerumo	Toyota Supra	GT500	TAI; Ret	**FUJ**; Ret	SUG; 10	**FUJ**; 4	**FUJ**; 3	MOT; 9	**AUT**; 3	SUZ; 13		9th	46
2004	Team Cerumo	Toyota Supra	GT500	TAI; 5	SUG; 1	SEP; 7	TOK; 14	MOT; 10	**AUT**; 11	SUZ; 4			5th	45
2005	Team Cerumo	Toyota Supra	GT500	OKA; 14	**FUJ**; 1	SEP; 11	SUG; 11	MOT; 12	FUJ; 1	AUT; 7	**SUZ**; 1		**1st**	**67**
2006	Team Cerumo	Lexus SC430	GT500	SUZ; 5	OKA; 5	**FUJ**; Ret	SEP; 12	**SUG**; 1	SUZ; 7	MOT; 3	AUT; 5	FUJ; Ret	5th	71
2007	Team Cerumo	Lexus SC430	GT500	SUZ; 1	OKA; 11	FUJ; 6	SEP; 4	SUG; 11	SUZ; 7	MOT; 14	**AUT**; Ret	FUJ; 4	7th	53
2008	Team Cerumo	Lexus SC430	GT500	SUZ; 4	OKA; 7	FUJ; 1	SEP; Ret	SUG; 3	SUZ; 9	MOT; 9	AUT; 4	FUJ; 2	**2nd**	**72**
2009	Team Cerumo	Lexus SC430	GT500	**OKA**; 6	SUZ; 1	FUJ; 9	SEP; 10	SUG; 10	SUZ; 3	FUJ; 10	**AUT**; 11	MOT; 12	10th	41
2010	Team Cerumo	Lexus SC430	GT500	SUZ; 9	OKA; 2	FUJ; 4	SEP; 6	SUG; 9	SUZ; 6	FUJ; C	MOT; Ret		9th	37
2011	Team Cerumo	Lexus SC430	GT500	OKA; 8	FUJ; 5	SEP; 5	SUG; 11	SUZ; 14	FUJ; 1	AUT; 3	MOT; 10		6th	47
2012	Team Cerumo	Lexus SC430	GT500	**OKA**; 1	FUJ; 8	SEP; 2	SUG; 5	SUZ; 8	FUJ; 8	AUT; 7	**MOT**; 1		**2nd**	**74**
2013	Team Cerumo	Lexus SC430	GT500	OKA; 4	FUJ; 2	SEP; 14	SUG; 11	SUZ; 11	**FUJ**; 1	**AUT**; 2	MOT; 3		**1st**	**69**
2014	Lexus Team Cerumo	Lexus RC F	GT500	OKA; 14	FUJ; 2	AUT; 12	SUG; 1	FUJ; 14	SUZ; 8	BUR; 11	MOT; 7		8th	43
2015	Lexus Team Cerumo	Lexus RC F	GT500	OKA; 3	FUJ; Ret	**CHA**; Ret	**FUJ**; 2	SUZ; 2	SUG; 10	AUT; 4	MOT; 5		4th	59
2016	Lexus Team Cerumo	Lexus RC F	GT500	OKA; 6	FUJ; 14	SUG; 3	FUJ; 7	SUZ; 1	CHA; 15	**MOT**; 6	**MOT**; 9		6th	52
2017	Lexus Team Cerumo	Lexus LC500	GT500	OKA; 4	FUJ; 1	AUT; 10	SUG; 13	FUJ; 3	SUZ; 10	CHA; 4	MOT; 3		4th	62
2018	Lexus Team ZENT Cerumo	Lexus LC500	GT500	OKA; 8	FUJ; 3	SUZ; 8	CHA; 4	FUJ; 8	SUG; 8	AUT; 4	MOT; 2		4th	59
2019	Lexus Team ZENT Cerumo	Lexus LC500	GT500	OKA; 8	FUJ; 1	SUZ; 6	CHA; 7	FUJ; Ret	AUT; 4	SUG; 11	MOT; 4		4th	46.5
2020	TGR Team ZENT Cerumo	Toyota GR Supra GT500	GT500	FUJ; 4	FUJ; 7	SUZ ret	MOT; 2	FUJ; 9	SUZ; 5	MOT; 10	FUJ; 8		10th	40
2021	TGR Team ZENT Cerumo	Toyota GR Supra GT500	GT500	OKA; 6	FUJ; Ret	MOT; 8	SUZ; 8	SUG; Ret	AUT; 2	MOT; 9	FUJ; 5		12th	34
2022	TGR Team ZENT Cerumo	Toyota GR Supra GT500	GT500	OKA; 4	FUJ; 12	SUZ; Ret	FUJ; Ret	SUZ; Ret	SUG; 4	AUT; Ret	MOT; 10		14th	16.5
2023	TGR Team ZENT Cerumo	Toyota GR Supra GT500	GT500	OKA; 5	FUJ; 13	SUZ; 10	FUJ; 6	SUZ; 5	SUG; Ret	AUT; 4	MOT; 11		13th	26

=== Complete Formula Nippon results ===
(key) (Races in bold indicate pole position) (Races in italics indicate fastest lap)

Year	Entrant	1	2	3	4	5	6	7	8	9	10	11	DC	Points
1997	Team LeMans	SUZ	MIN	FUJ	SUZ	SUG	FUJ	MIN	MOT	FUJ; 9	SUZ; Ret		24th	0
1998	Team TMS	SUZ	MIN	FUJ; 9	MOT; 5	SUZ; Ret	SUG; Ret	FUJ	MIN; Ret	FUJ; Ret	SUZ; 9		13th	2
1999	Cosmo Oil Racing Team Cerumo	SUZ; 5	MOT; 4	MIN; Ret	FUJ; 7	SUZ; 7	SUG; Ret	FUJ; Ret	MIN; Ret	MOT; 6	SUZ; 8		13th	6
2000	Cosmo Oil Racing Team Cerumo	SUZ; 8	MOT; Ret	MIN; Ret	FUJ; 4	SUZ; Ret	SUG; Ret	MOT; Ret	FUJ; 4	MIN; 4	SUZ; 12		10th	9
2001	Olympic Kondo Racing Team	SUZ; 13	MOT; 2	MIN; 11	FUJ; Ret	SUZ; 4	SUG; 4	FUJ; 2	MIN; 3	MOT; 5	SUZ; 2		**3rd**	**30**
2002	Cosmo Oil Racing Team Cerumo	SUZ	FUJ	MIN	SUZ	MOT	SUG; Ret	FUJ; 11	MIN; Ret	MOT; 9	SUZ; Ret		20th	0
2003	Olympic Kondo Racing Team	SUZ; 10	FUJ; 12	MIN; 10	MOT; Ret	SUZ; Ret	SUG; Ret	FUJ; Ret	MIN; Ret	MOT; 8	SUZ; Ret		18th	0
2004	Olympic Kondo Racing Team	SUZ; Ret	SUG; Ret	MOT; Ret	SUZ; 6	SUG; 5	MIN; 9	SEP; Ret	MOT; 7	SUZ; 9			14th	3
2006	Team Cerumo	FUJ; 12	SUZ; Ret	MOT; 10	SUZ; 4	AUT; 4	FUJ; 5	SUG; 7	MOT; 5	SUZ; Ret			8th	10
2007	Team Reckless Cerumo	FUJ; 16	SUZ; 8	MOT; 12	OKA; 6	SUZ; 12	FUJ; 5	SUG; 6	MOT; 9	SUZ; 13			12th	11
2008	Cerumo/INGING Motorsport	FUJ; 2	SUZ; 17	MOT; 7	OKA; 4	SUZ1; 17	SUZ2; 12	MOT1; 4	MOT2; 4	FUJ1; 9	FUJ2; 9	SUG; 15	7th	31
2009	Cerumo/INGING Motorsport	FUJ; 5	SUZ; 11	MOT; Ret	FUJ; 9	SUZ; 6	MOT; 7	AUT; Ret	SUG; 12				12th	9

=== 24 Hours of Le Mans results ===
Year	Team	Co-Drivers	Car	Class	Laps	Pos.	Class Pos.
2008	(Japan) Dome Racing Team	(Japan) Tatsuya Kataoka (Japan) Daisuke Itō	Dome S102-Judd	LMP1	272	33rd	13th

Sporting positions
Preceded by Jiro Nakatani	Formula Toyota West; Champion; 1994	Succeeded by Shinya Kurushima
Preceded by Ryo Michigami	All-Japan Grand Touring Car Champion (GT500); 2001 with: Hironori Takeuchi	Succeeded by Juichi Wakisaka; Akira Iida
Preceded by Satoshi Motoyama; Richard Lyons	Super GT (GT500) Champion; 2005 with: Toranosuke Takagi	Succeeded by Juichi Wakisaka; André Lotterer
Preceded by Ronnie Quintarelli; Masataka Yanagida	Super GT (GT500) Champion; 2013 with: Kohei Hirate	Succeeded by Tsugio Matsuda; Ronnie Quintarelli
