= 5ZIGEN =

Japanese automotive manufacturer

5ZIGEN International Inc.
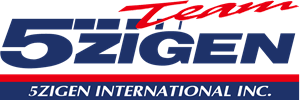
- Native name: 5ZIGENインターナショナル株式会社
- Romanized name: Go ZIGEN Intānashonaru Kabushiki-gaisha
- Industry: Manufacturing, Sales of automobile parts
- Founded: February 1987; 39 years ago
- Headquarters: Yao, Osaka Prefecture
- Key people: Masashi Kinoshita (President)
- Website: www.5zigen.co.jp

(Japan) Team 5ZIGEN
- Founded: 1989
- Base: Yao, Osaka Prefecture
- Team principal(s): Masashi Kinoshita
- Current series: GT World Challenge Asia; F4 Japanese Championship
- Former series: Japanese Formula 3 Championship; Japanese Touring Car Championship; Japan Grand Touring Car Championship; Formula Nippon; Super Taikyu
- Current drivers: GT World Challenge Asia: (Japan) "Hirobon"; (Japan) Yu Kanamaru; F4 Japanese Championship: (Japan) Motohiro Kotani
- Teams' Championships: 2022 Super Taikyu Series; 2001 Formula Nippon Championship
- Website: www.5zigen.co.jp

5ZIGEN International Inc. (5ZIGENインターナショナル株式会社, Go ZIGEN Intānashonaru Kabushiki-gaisha) is a Japanese automotive manufacturer which produces wheel parts, exhaust systems, which mostly involved in the motorsport industry. The company also runs a racing team, Team 5ZIGEN

== Company's history ==
5ZIGEN was founded in February 1987, starting out by developing sports mufflers. Following that, the company expanded into motorsport related parts, developing wheel rims, suspensions, etc.

== Racing team's history ==
5ZIGEN then expanded into racing in 1989, as the company built a racing team named "Team 5ZIGEN". They first competed in the Regional Championship Suzuka RS Race. In 1991, the team competed in the Japanese Formula 3 Championship. For 1992, they competed in Japanese Touring Car Championship. Team 5ZIGEN then participated in the All-Japan Formula 3000 in 1993 with Ad Racing Team Co. Ltd., using a Lola Mugen Honda, with Minoru Tanaka as the driver, but in the following season the team ran independently, with Thomas Danielsson as their driver. For 1997, the team started to get involved in Japan Grand Touring Car Championship. They raced with Toyota Supra as Eiichi Tajima, and Marc Goossens drove the car. The pair won on the last race of the season, and finished in 8th in the standings.

In 2003 the elected to focus on the maintenance of teams competing in Super GT, and other local Japanese series. In 2008, the team stopped racing under the "Team 5ZIGEN" banner, as they elected to focus more on running other teams' operational technical cooperation in various categories, including Super GT GT300.

Team 5ZIGEN returned racing the brand in 2020, competing in the Super Taikyu Series. They race in the ST-Z Class with a Mercedes-AMG GT4. In Super Taikyu Series, Ryuichiro Otsuka, Kakunoshin Ohta, and Toshihiro Kaneishi won the Super Taikyu ST-Z title. The team changed their car to Nissan GT-R Nismo GT3 as they moved to the ST-X class. Shintaro Kawabata, "Hirobon", Hiromasa Kitano, and Yu Kanamaru competed for the first round and sixth round. The team are currently focusing on the GT World Challenge Asia four-round Fanatec Japan Cup for 2023, as Shintaro Kawabata, and "Hirobon" compete with the same Nissan they race in Super Taikyu. The team continued to compete in the GT World Challenge Asia, this time doing the full calendar with Yu Kanamaru and "Hirobon". They won in the second race at Buriram in the Silver Am Class. The team also entered in the F4 Japanese Championship, with Motohiro Kotani as their Independent class driver.
