= Mine Circuit =

Motor racing circuit in Japan

- Central Park Mine Circuit (1991–2006)
- Location: Mine, Yamaguchi Prefecture, Japan
- Coordinates: 34°08′35″N 131°06′12″E
- Owner: Mazda (January 2006–February 2006); CQ Motors (2002–January 2006)
- Opened: November 1972; 53 years ago
- Closed: 28 February 2006; 20 years ago
- Former names: Nishi-Nihon Circuit (1976–1990); Atsu Circuit (1972–1975)
- Major events: Formula Nippon (1977–1980, 1983–2005); Japanese F3 (1994–2005); JGTC (1994–2002); JTCC (1985–1990, 1992–1998); All-Japan Sports Prototype Championship (1992)

Central Park Mine Circuit (1991–2006)
- Length: 3.331 km (2.070 mi)
- Turns: 16
- Race lap record: 1:14.618 ( (Japan) Katsumi Yamamoto, Reynard 97D, 1997, Formula Nippon)

Nishi-Nihon Circuit (1976–1990)
- Length: 2.830 km (1.758 mi)
- Turns: 13
- Race lap record: 1:01.447 ( (Japan) Hitoshi Ogawa, Lola T90/50, 1990, F3000)

Atsu Circuit (1972–1975)
- Length: 1.300 km (0.808 mi)
- Turns: 7

Mine Circuit (みねサーキット) was a 3.331 km (2.070 mi) motor racing circuit in Nagao, Nishiatsu-cho, Mine, Yamaguchi Prefecture, Japan. It used to be known as Nishinihon. The track closed in February 2006 as it was sold to Mazda for development purposes.

It was one of the main circuits in Japanese motorsport; until 2005, every year, one or more races of the most important national categories, (the Japan GT Championship and Formula Nippon series) were held at this circuit.

== Lap records ==
The fastest official race lap records at the Mine Circuit are listed as:

Category	Time	Driver	Vehicle	Event
Central Park Mine Circuit (1991–2006): 3.331 km (2.070 mi)
Formula Nippon	1:14.618	Katsumi Yamamoto	Reynard 97D	1997 Mine Formula Nippon round
Formula 3000	1:14.669	Jeff Krosnoff	Lola T94/50	1995 F3000 Mine All Star
Group C	1:17.615	Geoff Lees	Toyota TS010	1992 Inter-Challenge Cup Mine 500 km
Formula Three	1:22.842	Fábio Carbone	Dallara F304	2004 Mine Japanese F3 round
JGTC (GT500)	1:23.186	Ryo Michigami	Honda NSX (LA-NA2)	2002 CP Mine GT Race
GT1	1:23.940	André Couto	McLaren F1 GTR	2001 CP Mine GT Race
Formula Toyota	1:27.933	Kohei Hirate	Tom's FT30	2002 Mine Formula Toyota round
Group A	1:29.259	Kazuyoshi Hoshino	Nissan Skyline GT-R BNR32	1993 Mine JTCC round
JGTC (GT300)	1:29.507	Masaoki Nagashima	Toyota MR-S (ZZW30)	2002 CP Mine GT Race
GT2	1:29.948	Eiichi Tajima	Porsche 911 GT2	1995 CP Mine GT Race
Super Touring	1:31.982	Masanori Sekiya	Toyota Chaser	1998 Mine JTCC round
GT	1:32.418	Shinsuke Shibahara	Porsche 911 (996) GT3-R	2000 CP Mine GT Race
Nishi-Nihon Circuit (1976–1990): 2.830 km (1.758 mi)
Formula 3000	1:01.447	Hitoshi Ogawa	Lola T90/50	1990 Mine Japanese F3000 round
Group C	1:07.920	Kunimitsu Takahashi	Porsche 962C	1985 Mine Super Cup
Group A	1:13.377	Kazuyoshi Hoshino	Nissan Skyline GT-R BNR32	1990 Mine JTCC round

== See also ==
- Mazda Proving Grounds
