= 1997 All Japan Grand Touring Car Championship =

Motorsports season

Seasons
- ← 1996 1998 →

The 1997 All Japan Grand Touring Car Championship was the fifth season of the All-Japan GT Championship, now known as the Super GT Series, and the 15th season of top-level Japanese sports car racing dating back to the formation of the previous All-Japan Endurance/Sports Prototype Championship.

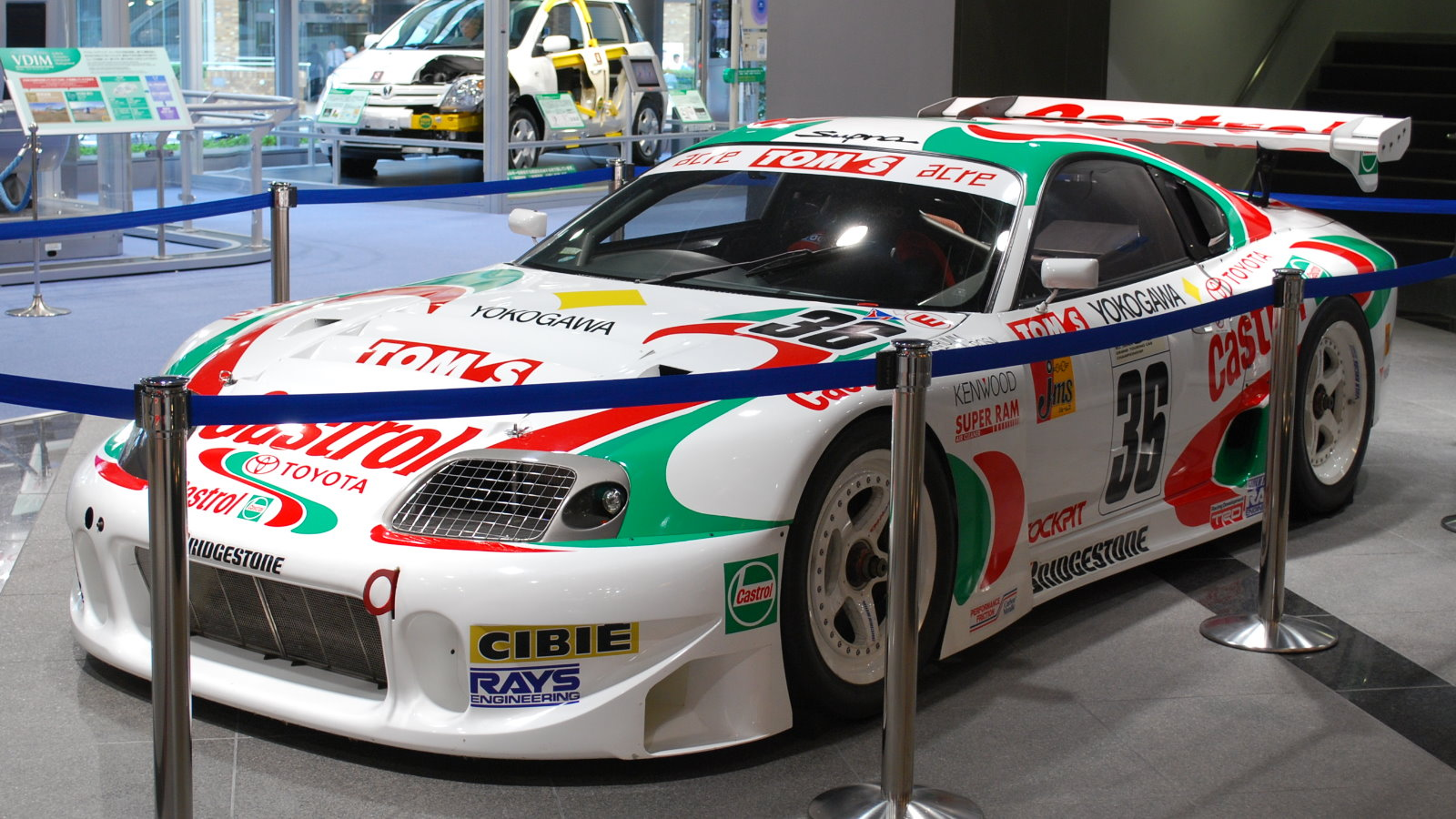
1997 GT500 champions, #36 Castrol TOM'S Toyota Supra

Michael Krumm and Pedro de la Rosa won the GT500 class championship for Toyota Castrol Team in the #36 Castrol TOM's Supra. Hideo Fukuyama and Manabu Orido won the GT300 class championship for Racing Project Bandoh in the #19 Nissan Silvia.

The GT500 Drivers' Championship was decided on a tiebreaker for the first time in JGTC/Super GT history. The duo of De la Rosa and Krumm, and Toyota Team SARD driver Masami Kageyama each scored 67 points, with two victories, and one second place finish. But a third-place finish for De la Rosa and Krumm broke the tie, giving them the championship for the Toyota Castrol Team. De la Rosa became the first driver to win both the GT500 Drivers' Championship, and the Japanese Top Formula Championship in Formula Nippon (now Super Formula), in the same calendar year.

For the second year in a row, the GT Association (GTA) held a non-championship all-star race at the end of the year. The race was held at the new Twin Ring Motegi circuit which had opened earlier in the year. Instead of using the 4.801-kilometre road course, the series raced around the 2.414 km superspeedway oval with cone chicanes installed around the banked corners. The circuit, now known as Mobility Resort Motegi, staged its first championship race the following year and has remained on the JGTC/Super GT schedule ever since.

== Drivers and teams ==
=== GT500 ===
Entrant	Team Name	Make	Car	Engine	No.	Drivers	Tyre	Rounds
NISMO	ZEXEL Skyline	Nissan	Nissan Skyline GT-R	Nissan RB26DETT 2.6 L Twin Turbo I6	2	(Japan) Aguri Suzuki	B	All
NISMO	ZEXEL Skyline	Nissan	Nissan Skyline GT-R	Nissan RB26DETT 2.6 L Twin Turbo I6	2	(France) Érik Comas	B	1, 3–6, NC
NISMO	ZEXEL Skyline	Nissan	Nissan Skyline GT-R	Nissan RB26DETT 2.6 L Twin Turbo I6	2	(Italy) Marco Apicella	B	2
NISMO	KURE R33	Nissan	Nissan Skyline GT-R	Nissan RB26DETT 2.6 L Twin Turbo I6	556	(Japan) Masahiko Kageyama	B	All
NISMO	KURE R33	Nissan	Nissan Skyline GT-R	Nissan RB26DETT 2.6 L Twin Turbo I6	556	(Japan) Masahiko Kondo	B	All
Hasemi Motorsports	Unisia JECS Skyline	Nissan	Nissan Skyline GT-R	Nissan RB26DETT 2.6 L Twin Turbo I6	3	(Japan) Masahiro Hasemi	B	All
Hasemi Motorsports	Unisia JECS Skyline	Nissan	Nissan Skyline GT-R	Nissan RB26DETT 2.6 L Twin Turbo I6	3	(Japan) Tetsuya Tanaka	B	All
Suzuki Bankin	Advan Porsche (1); Alpha Computer Porsche (2, 4–5); Dunlop Porsche (3, 6)	Porsche	Porsche 993 GT2	Porsche M64/81 3.6 L Turbo F6	4	(Japan) Tatsuhiko Kaneumi	Y (1–2); D (3–6)	All
Suzuki Bankin	Advan Porsche (1); Alpha Computer Porsche (2, 4–5); Dunlop Porsche (3, 6)	Porsche	Porsche 993 GT2	Porsche M64/81 3.6 L Turbo F6	4	(Japan) Mitsutake Koma	Y (1–2); D (3–6)	All
Team 5ZIGEN	5ZIGEN Supra	Toyota	Toyota Supra	Toyota 3S-GT 2.0 L Turbo I4	5	(Japan) Eiichi Tajima	D	All
Team 5ZIGEN	5ZIGEN Supra	Toyota	Toyota Supra	Toyota 3S-GT 2.0 L Turbo I4	5	(Belgium) Marc Goossens	D	1–6
Team 5ZIGEN	5ZIGEN Supra	Toyota	Toyota Supra	Toyota 3S-GT 2.0 L Turbo I4	5	(Japan) Hiro Matsushita	D	NC
Power Craft	Power Craft TRD Supra	Toyota	Toyota Supra	Toyota 3S-GT 2.0 L Turbo I4	8	(France) Bertrand Gachot	B	1–2
Power Craft	Power Craft TRD Supra	Toyota	Toyota Supra	Toyota 3S-GT 2.0 L Turbo I4	8	(France) Paul Belmondo	B	1–2
Power Craft	Power Craft TRD Supra	Toyota	Toyota Supra	Toyota 3S-GT 2.0 L Turbo I4	8	(Australia) Wayne Gardner	B	3–4, 6, NC
Power Craft	Power Craft TRD Supra	Toyota	Toyota Supra	Toyota 3S-GT 2.0 L Turbo I4	8	(Japan) Naoki Nagasaka	B	3, 5, 6
Power Craft	Power Craft TRD Supra	Toyota	Toyota Supra	Toyota 3S-GT 2.0 L Turbo I4	8	(Denmark) Tom Kristensen	B	4–5, NC
Team TMS	Chateraise Porsche GT2	Porsche	Porsche 993 GT2	Porsche M64/81 3.6 L Turbo F6	10	(Japan) Kaoru Iida	D	All
Team TMS	Chateraise Porsche GT2	Porsche	Porsche 993 GT2	Porsche M64/81 3.6 L Turbo F6	10	(Republic of Ireland) Ralph Firman	D	All
Hoshino Racing	Calsonic Skyline	Nissan	Nissan Skyline GT-R	Nissan RB26DETT 2.6 L Twin Turbo I6	12	(Japan) Satoshi Motoyama	B	1–6
Hoshino Racing	Calsonic Skyline	Nissan	Nissan Skyline GT-R	Nissan RB26DETT 2.6 L Twin Turbo I6	12	(Japan) Kazuyoshi Hoshino	B	1, 3–6, NC
Hoshino Racing	Calsonic Skyline	Nissan	Nissan Skyline GT-R	Nissan RB26DETT 2.6 L Twin Turbo I6	12	(Japan) Fuminori Mizuno	B	2
Hoshino Racing	Calsonic Skyline	Nissan	Nissan Skyline GT-R	Nissan RB26DETT 2.6 L Twin Turbo I6	12	(Japan) Takeshi Tsuchiya	B	NC
Endless Sports	Endless Advan GT-R	Nissan	Nissan Skyline GT-R	Nissan RB26DETT 2.6 L Twin Turbo I6	13	(Japan) Mitsuhiro Kinoshita	Y	All
Endless Sports	Endless Advan GT-R	Nissan	Nissan Skyline GT-R	Nissan RB26DETT 2.6 L Twin Turbo I6	13	(Japan) Yasushi Kikuchi	Y	1
Endless Sports	Endless Advan GT-R	Nissan	Nissan Skyline GT-R	Nissan RB26DETT 2.6 L Twin Turbo I6	13	(Japan) Mitsuo Fujimura	Y	2–6
Mugen + Dome Project	avex Dome Mugen NSX	Honda	Honda NSX	Honda C32B 3.5 L V6	18	(Japan) Takuya Kurosawa	B	2–6, NC
Mugen + Dome Project	avex Dome Mugen NSX	Honda	Honda NSX	Honda C32B 3.5 L V6	18	(Japan) Katsumi Yamamoto	B	2–6, NC
Team Take One	SOK Porsche	Porsche	Porsche 993 GT2	Porsche M64/81 3.6 L Turbo F6	30	(Japan) Yoji Yamada	B	All
Team Take One	SOK Porsche	Porsche	Porsche 993 GT2	Porsche M64/81 3.6 L Turbo F6	30	(Japan) Kazuo Mogi	B	All
Team Taisan Advan	STP Taisan Porsche GT2	Porsche	Porsche 993 GT2	Porsche M64/81 3.6 L Turbo F6	34	(Japan) Keiichi Tsuchiya	Y	3–4
Team Taisan Advan	STP Taisan Porsche GT2	Porsche	Porsche 993 GT2	Porsche M64/81 3.6 L Turbo F6	34	(Japan) Hideshi Matsuda	Y	3–4
Team Taisan Advan	STP Taisan Advan Viper	Dodge	Dodge Viper GTS-R	Dodge EWB 8.0 L V10	34	(Japan) Keiichi Tsuchiya	Y	5–6, NC
Team Taisan Advan	STP Taisan Advan Viper	Dodge	Dodge Viper GTS-R	Dodge EWB 8.0 L V10	34	(Japan) Hideshi Matsuda	Y	5–6, NC
Toyota Castrol Team (Note: 1. 36 and #37 operated by TOM's, #38 operated by Cerumo)	Castrol TOM's Supra	Toyota	Toyota Supra	Toyota 3S-GT 2.0 L Turbo I4	36	(Germany) Michael Krumm	B	1–6
Toyota Castrol Team	Castrol TOM's Supra	Toyota	Toyota Supra	Toyota 3S-GT 2.0 L Turbo I4	36	(Spain) Pedro de la Rosa	B	1–6
Toyota Castrol Team	Castrol TOM's Supra	Toyota	Toyota Supra	Toyota 3S-GT 2.0 L Turbo I4	36	(Japan) Masanori Sekiya	B	NC
Toyota Castrol Team	Castrol TOM's Supra	Toyota	Toyota Supra	Toyota 3S-GT 2.0 L Turbo I4	36	(Japan) Ukyo Katayama	B	NC
Toyota Castrol Team	Castrol TOM's Supra	Toyota	Toyota Supra	Toyota 3S-GT 2.0 L Turbo I4	37	(Japan) Toshio Suzuki	B	All
Toyota Castrol Team	Castrol TOM's Supra	Toyota	Toyota Supra	Toyota 3S-GT 2.0 L Turbo I4	37	(Japan) Masanori Sekiya	B	1–6
Toyota Castrol Team	Castrol TOM's Supra	Toyota	Toyota Supra	Toyota 3S-GT 2.0 L Turbo I4	37	(Japan) Shingo Tachi	B	NC
Toyota Castrol Team	Castrol Cerumo Supra	Toyota	Toyota Supra	Toyota 3S-GT 2.0 L Turbo I4	38	(Japan) Hironori Takeuchi	B	All
Toyota Castrol Team	Castrol Cerumo Supra	Toyota	Toyota Supra	Toyota 3S-GT 2.0 L Turbo I4	38	(Japan) Katsutomo Kaneishi	B	All
Toyota Team SARD	Denso SARD Supra	Toyota	Toyota Supra	Toyota 3S-GT 2.0 L Turbo I4	39	(Japan) Masami Kageyama	Y	All
Toyota Team SARD	Denso SARD Supra	Toyota	Toyota Supra	Toyota 3S-GT 2.0 L Turbo I4	39	(France) Olivier Grouillard	Y	1
Toyota Team SARD	Denso SARD Supra	Toyota	Toyota Supra	Toyota 3S-GT 2.0 L Turbo I4	39	(Japan) Tatsuya Tanigawa	Y	2–6, NC
Susuki Racing Mechanics	Advance Auto GT Camaro	Chevrolet	Chevrolet Camaro	Chevrolet LT1 6.0 L V8	47	(Japan) Masato Yamamoto	G	4
Susuki Racing Mechanics	Advance Auto GT Camaro	Chevrolet	Chevrolet Camaro	Chevrolet LT1 6.0 L V8	47	(Japan) Katsuhiko Okamoto	G	4
Team LeMans	Nissan 300ZX-GTS	Nissan	Nissan Fairlady Z LM	Nissan VH45DE 4.5 L V8	75	(Japan) Yuji Tachikawa	Y	1–2
Team LeMans	Nissan 300ZX-GTS	Nissan	Nissan Fairlady Z LM	Nissan VH45DE 4.5 L V8	75	(Japan) Tsuyoshi Takahashi	Y	1–2
JLOC Corsa	JLOC Diablo GTR	Lamborghini	Lamborghini Diablo GTR	Lamborghini L532 6.0 L V12	88	(Japan) Takao Wada	D	2–6, NC
JLOC Corsa	JLOC Diablo GTR	Lamborghini	Lamborghini Diablo GTR	Lamborghini L532 6.0 L V12	88	(Japan) Hisashi Wada	D	2–6, NC
Team Kunimitsu with Mooncraft	Raybrig NSX	Honda	Honda NSX	Honda C32B 3.5 L V6	100	(Japan) Kunimitsu Takahashi	B	2–6, NC
Team Kunimitsu with Mooncraft	Raybrig NSX	Honda	Honda NSX	Honda C32B 3.5 L V6	100	(Japan) Akira Iida	B	2–6, NC
Ryowa House Pacific Team Cerumo (Note: Operated by Cerumo with drivers from Power Craft)	RH Cerumo Supra	Toyota	Toyota Supra	Toyota 3S-GT 2.0 L Turbo I4	510	(France) Bertrand Gachot	B	3–6
Ryowa House Pacific Team Cerumo	RH Cerumo Supra	Toyota	Toyota Supra	Toyota 3S-GT 2.0 L Turbo I4	510	(France) Paul Belmondo	B	3–6

=== GT300 ===
Entrant	Team Name	Make	Car	Engine	No.	Drivers	Tyre	Rounds
KRAFT	Wise Sports Dunlop BP MR2	Toyota	Toyota MR2	Toyota 3S-GE 2.0 L I4	6	(Japan) Hiroki Katoh	D	1–6
KRAFT	Wise Sports Dunlop BP MR2	Toyota	Toyota MR2	Toyota 3S-GE 2.0 L I4	6	(Japan) Takahiro Fujita	D	1–6
KRAFT	Wise Sports Dunlop BP Cavalier	Toyota	Toyota Cavalier	Toyota 3S-GE 2.0 L I4	60	(Japan) Kumi Sato	D	4–6, NC
KRAFT	Wise Sports Dunlop BP Cavalier	Toyota	Toyota Cavalier	Toyota 3S-GE 2.0 L I4	60	(Japan) Minoru Tanaka	D	4–6, NC
RE Amemiya Racing	RE Amemiya SuperG RX-7	Mazda	Mazda RX-7 (FD3S)	Mazda RE20B 2.0 L 3-rotor	7	(Japan) Shinichi Yamaji	D	All
RE Amemiya Racing	RE Amemiya SuperG RX-7	Mazda	Mazda RX-7 (FD3S)	Mazda RE20B 2.0 L 3-rotor	7	(Japan) Haruhiko Matsumoto	D	All
Team 5ZIGEN	PCJ 5ZIGEN RSR	Porsche	Porsche 993 RSR	Porsche M64/80 3.8 L F6	9	(Japan) Tsunefumi Hioki	D	1–2
Team 5ZIGEN	PCJ 5ZIGEN RSR	Porsche	Porsche 993 RSR	Porsche M64/80 3.8 L F6	9	(Japan) Masaharu Kinoshita	D	1–2
M Factory Racing	Murauchi Kamei Skyline	Nissan	Nissan Skyline GTS-R (HR31)	Nissan SR20DET 2.0 L Turbo I4	11	(Japan) Hiromoto Ishimori	B	2
M Factory Racing	Murauchi Kamei Skyline	Nissan	Nissan Skyline GTS-R (HR31)	Nissan SR20DET 2.0 L Turbo I4	11	(Japan) Kinji Suzuki	B	2
Kamco Works	Kamco Workstation GT-R	Nissan	Nissan Skyline GT-R (R32)	Nissan RB26DETT 2.6 L Twin Turbo I6	15	(Japan) Takeshi Odagiri	Y	4
Kamco Works	Kamco Workstation GT-R	Nissan	Nissan Skyline GT-R (R32)	Nissan RB26DETT 2.6 L Twin Turbo I6	15	(Japan) Takatoshi Onoda	Y	4
Team Power Magic	YB BMW 318i Coupe	BMW	BMW 318i Coupe	BMW M43B18 1.8L I4	16	(Japan) Motoji Sekine	Y	All
Team Power Magic	YB BMW 318i Coupe	BMW	BMW 318i Coupe	BMW M43B18 1.8L I4	16	(Japan) Hiroyuki Iiri	Y	1–2
Team Power Magic	YB BMW 318i Coupe	BMW	BMW 318i Coupe	BMW M43B18 1.8L I4	16	(Japan) Toshiya Fujishima	Y	3–6
Kageisen Racing Team	Tokyo College of Science and Arts RX-7 (1)	Mazda	Mazda RX-7 (FC3S)	Mazda RE13B 1.3 L 2-rotor	17	(Japan) Toshihiko Nogami	D	1
Kageisen Racing Team	Tokyo College of Science and Arts RX-7 (1)	Mazda	Mazda RX-7 (FC3S)	Mazda RE13B 1.3 L 2-rotor	17	(Japan) Toshiaki Koshimizu	D	1
Kageisen Racing Team	Tokyo Polytechnic Institute Roadster (2–4, 6)	Mazda	Mazda Roadster (NA)	Mazda RE13B 1.3 L 2-rotor	17	(Japan) Toshihiko Nogami	D	2–4, 6, NC
Kageisen Racing Team	Tokyo Polytechnic Institute Roadster (2–4, 6)	Mazda	Mazda Roadster (NA)	Mazda RE13B 1.3 L 2-rotor	17	(Japan) Tomoyuki Hosono	D	2–4, 6, NC
RS-R Racing with Bandoh	RS-R Silvia	Nissan	Nissan Silvia (S14)	Nissan SR20DET 2.0 L Turbo I4	19	(Japan) Manabu Orido	Y	All
RS-R Racing with Bandoh	RS-R Silvia	Nissan	Nissan Silvia (S14)	Nissan SR20DET 2.0 L Turbo I4	19	(Japan) Hideo Fukuyama	Y	All
AI Auto Racing	AI Auto GAB Porsche	Porsche	Porsche 993 RS	Porsche M64/70 3.8 L F6	20	(Japan) Kenji Takahashi	Y	All
AI Auto Racing	AI Auto GAB Porsche	Porsche	Porsche 993 RS	Porsche M64/70 3.8 L F6	20	(Japan) Hiroaki Suga	Y	All
Hitotsuyama Racing	Dunlop BP BMW	BMW	BMW M3 (E36)	BMW S14 2.2 L Turbo I4	21	(Japan) Yasushi Hitotsuyama	D	1–2, 6
Hitotsuyama Racing	Dunlop BP BMW	BMW	BMW M3 (E36)	BMW S14 2.2 L Turbo I4	21	(Japan) Takayuki Kinoshita	D	1
Hitotsuyama Racing	Dunlop BP BMW	BMW	BMW M3 (E36)	BMW S14 2.2 L Turbo I4	21	(Japan) Kenji Yamamoto	D	2–4
Hitotsuyama Racing	Dunlop BP BMW	BMW	BMW M3 (E36)	BMW S14 2.2 L Turbo I4	21	(Japan) Mikio Hitotsuyama	D	3–5
Hitotsuyama Racing	Dunlop BP BMW	BMW	BMW M3 (E36)	BMW S14 2.2 L Turbo I4	21	(Japan) Mizuno Fuminori	D	5–6
Hirano Motorsport	Hirano Motorsport R32M	Nissan	Nissan Skyline GTS-i (R32)	Nissan RB20DET 2.0 L Turbo I6	24	(Japan) Toshiyuki Hirano	Y	4
Hirano Motorsport	Hirano Motorsport R32M	Nissan	Nissan Skyline GTS-i (R32)	Nissan RB20DET 2.0 L Turbo I6	24	(Japan) Hisanori Kuboyama	Y	4
Tsuchiya Engineering	Atlus Tsuchiya MR2 (1–2); Tsuchiya MR2 (3–6)	Toyota	Toyota MR2	Toyota 3S-GTE 2.0 L Turbo I4	25	(Japan) Masaoki Nagashima	Y	All
Tsuchiya Engineering	Atlus Tsuchiya MR2 (1–2); Tsuchiya MR2 (3–6)	Toyota	Toyota MR2	Toyota 3S-GTE 2.0 L Turbo I4	25	(Japan) Takeshi Tsuchiya	Y	1–6
Tsuchiya Engineering	Atlus Tsuchiya MR2 (1–2); Tsuchiya MR2 (3–6)	Toyota	Toyota MR2	Toyota 3S-GTE 2.0 L Turbo I4	25	(Japan) Sakae Obata	Y	NC
Team Taisan Jr.	Taisan Star Card RSR	Porsche	Porsche 993 RSR	Porsche M64/80 3.8 L F6	26	(Japan) Keiichi Suzuki	Y	All
Team Taisan Jr.	Taisan Star Card RSR	Porsche	Porsche 993 RSR	Porsche M64/80 3.8 L F6	26	(Japan) Morio Nitta	Y	All
Team Ferrari Club of Japan	Team FCJ Ferrari (1–4); Shell Ferrari F355 (5–6)	Ferrari	Ferrari F355 GT	Ferrari F129B 3.5 L V8	27	(Japan) Tetsuya Ota	Y	1–4, 6, NC
Team Ferrari Club of Japan	Team FCJ Ferrari (1–4); Shell Ferrari F355 (5–6)	Ferrari	Ferrari F355 GT	Ferrari F129B 3.5 L V8	27	(Sweden) Anders Olofsson	Y	1–2, 4, NC
Team Ferrari Club of Japan	Team FCJ Ferrari (1–4); Shell Ferrari F355 (5–6)	Ferrari	Ferrari F355 GT	Ferrari F129B 3.5 L V8	27	(Sweden) Steven Andskär	Y	3, 6
Team Ferrari Club of Japan	Team FCJ Ferrari	Ferrari	Ferrari F355 GT	Ferrari F129B 3.5 L V8	28	(Japan) Masami Sugiyama	Y	All
Team Ferrari Club of Japan	Team FCJ Ferrari	Ferrari	Ferrari F355 GT	Ferrari F129B 3.5 L V8	28	(Japan) Masahiro Yamazaki	Y	1–4, 6
Team Ferrari Club of Japan	Team FCJ Ferrari	Ferrari	Ferrari F355 GT	Ferrari F129B 3.5 L V8	28	(Japan) Tetsuya Ota	Y	5
Signal	Friends Nito Seaside Silvia	Nissan	Nissan Silvia (S13)	Nissan FJ20DET 2.0 L Turbo I4	45	(Japan) Takeshi Yuasa	Y	1–2
Signal	Friends Nito Seaside Silvia	Nissan	Nissan Silvia (S13)	Nissan FJ20DET 2.0 L Turbo I4	45	(Japan) Kiyoaki Hanai	Y	1–2
Cobra Racing Team	Cobra Porsche	Porsche	Porsche 993 RSR	Porsche M64/80 3.8 L F6	51	(Japan) Katsunori Iketani	Y	All
Cobra Racing Team	Cobra Porsche	Porsche	Porsche 993 RSR	Porsche M64/80 3.8 L F6	51	(Japan) Masamitsu Ishihara	Y	1–2, 4–6
Cobra Racing Team	Cobra Porsche	Porsche	Porsche 993 RSR	Porsche M64/80 3.8 L F6	51	(Japan) Masami Sugiyama	Y	3
S.D.R.	Che'Nelle Porsche SDR	Porsche	Porsche 993 RSR	Porsche M64/80 3.8 L F6	54	(Japan) Nobuyuki Tanaka	Y	6
S.D.R.	Che'Nelle Porsche SDR	Porsche	Porsche 993 RSR	Porsche M64/80 3.8 L F6	54	(Japan) Kazushige Saito	Y	6
Sports Factory Racing	Castrol RX-7 (1–3); Castrol FS RX-7 (4, 6)	Mazda	Mazda RX-7 (FD3S)	Mazda RE13B 1.3 L 2-rotor	55	(Japan) Toshihiro Fukazawa	D	1–3, 4, 6
Sports Factory Racing	Castrol RX-7 (1–3); Castrol FS RX-7 (4, 6)	Mazda	Mazda RX-7 (FD3S)	Mazda RE13B 1.3 L 2-rotor	55	(Japan) Masaaki Nagashima	D	1–3, 4, 6
ecurie SiFo	SiFo Spider Version GT	Renault	Renault Sport Spider	Renault F7R 2.0 L I4	57	(Japan) Hideyuki Tamamoto	M	2
ecurie SiFo	SiFo Spider Version GT	Renault	Renault Sport Spider	Renault F7R 2.0 L I4	57	(Japan) Michiko Okuyama	M	2
ecurie SiFo	SiFo Spider Version GT	Renault	Renault Sport Spider	Renault F7R 2.0 L I4	57	(Japan) Tomohiko Sunako	M	6
ecurie SiFo	SiFo Spider Version GT	Renault	Renault Sport Spider	Renault F7R 2.0 L I4	57	(Japan) Akira Yoshitomi	M	6
Team Gaikokuya	Gaikokuya Dunlop Porsche	Porsche	Porsche 993 RSR	Porsche M64/80 3.8 L F6	70	(Japan) Yoshimi Ishibashi	Y	All
Team Gaikokuya	Gaikokuya Dunlop Porsche	Porsche	Porsche 993 RSR	Porsche M64/80 3.8 L F6	70	(Japan) Nobuo Komiya	Y	All
SigmaTec Racing Team	SigmaTec 911	Porsche	Porsche 993 RSR	Porsche M64/80 3.8 L F6	71	(Japan) Kaoru Hoshino	D	All
SigmaTec Racing Team	SigmaTec 911	Porsche	Porsche 993 RSR	Porsche M64/80 3.8 L F6	71	(Japan) Masaki Jyonai	D	All
Makiguchi Engineering	WAKO'S BMW M3	BMW	BMW M3 (E36)	BMW S14 2.5 L I4	72	(Japan) Norio Makiguchi	Y	All
Makiguchi Engineering	WAKO'S BMW M3	BMW	BMW M3 (E36)	BMW S14 2.5 L I4	72	(Japan) Takeshi Asami	Y	All
Cusco Racing	Cusco Subaru Impreza	Subaru	Subaru Impreza WRX STI	Subaru EJ20 2.0 L Turbo F4	77	(Japan) Katsuo Kobayashi	Y	6
Cusco Racing	Cusco Subaru Impreza	Subaru	Subaru Impreza WRX STI	Subaru EJ20 2.0 L Turbo F4	77	(Japan) Naohiro Furuya	Y	6
NAC West	NAC West Silvia	Nissan	Nissan Silvia (S13)	Nissan FJ20DET 2.0 L Turbo I4	79	(Japan) Masanori Sugiyama	D	2, 4
NAC West	NAC West Silvia	Nissan	Nissan Silvia (S13)	Nissan FJ20DET 2.0 L Turbo I4	79	(Japan) Hiroyasu Aoyagi	D	2, 4
Team Daishin	Daishin Silvia	Nissan	Nissan Silvia (S14)	Nissan SR20DET 2.0 L Turbo I4	81	(Japan) Nobuyuki Ohyagi	B (1–2); D (3–6)	All
Team Daishin	Daishin Silvia	Nissan	Nissan Silvia (S14)	Nissan SR20DET 2.0 L Turbo I4	81	(Japan) Tsuneaki Mankumo	B (1–2); D (3–6)	1
Team Daishin	Daishin Silvia	Nissan	Nissan Silvia (S14)	Nissan SR20DET 2.0 L Turbo I4	81	(Japan) Takayuki Kinoshita	B (1–2); D (3–6)	2–6
First Racing Team	Buddy Club MR2	Toyota	Toyota MR2	Toyota 3S-GTE 2.0 L Turbo I4	91	(Japan) Masahiro Matsunaga	Y	All
First Racing Team	Buddy Club MR2	Toyota	Toyota MR2	Toyota 3S-GTE 2.0 L Turbo I4	91	(Japan) Junko Mihara	Y	All
Shimizu Racing Enterprise	Castrol Porsche (1–3); Porsche (4, 6)	Porsche	Porsche 993 RSR	Porsche M64/80 3.8 L F6	333	(Japan) Masatomo Shimizu	D	1–2, 4, 6
Shimizu Racing Enterprise	Castrol Porsche (1–3); Porsche (4, 6)	Porsche	Porsche 993 RSR	Porsche M64/80 3.8 L F6	333	(Japan) Yoshimi Katayama	D	1–2
Shimizu Racing Enterprise	Castrol Porsche (1–3); Porsche (4, 6)	Porsche	Porsche 993 RSR	Porsche M64/80 3.8 L F6	333	(Japan) Shigekazu Saeki	D	4
Shimizu Racing Enterprise	Castrol Porsche (1–3); Porsche (4, 6)	Porsche	Porsche 993 RSR	Porsche M64/80 3.8 L F6	333	(Japan) Fumihito Sakamoto	D	6
Tackle & RS Matsumoto	PCJ Shiomi Clinic RSR	Porsche	Porsche 993 RSR	Porsche M64/80 3.8 L F6	777	(Japan) Katsuya Makita	D	1
Tackle & RS Matsumoto	PCJ Shiomi Clinic RSR	Porsche	Porsche 993 RSR	Porsche M64/80 3.8 L F6	777	(Japan) Katsuharu Shiomi	D	1
910 Racing	910 Porsche	Porsche	Porsche 993 RSR	Porsche M64/80 3.8 L F6	910	(Japan) Seiichi Sodeyama	D	All
910 Racing	910 Porsche	Porsche	Porsche 993 RSR	Porsche M64/80 3.8 L F6	910	(Japan) Kiyoshi Misaki	D	1
910 Racing	910 Porsche	Porsche	Porsche 993 RSR	Porsche M64/80 3.8 L F6	910	(Japan) Tomohiko Sunako	D	2–3
910 Racing	910 Porsche	Porsche	Porsche 993 RSR	Porsche M64/80 3.8 L F6	910	(Japan) Hideyuki Tamamoto	D	4–6
910 Racing	910 TIB Porsche	Porsche	Porsche 993 RSR	Porsche M64/80 3.8 L F6	911	(Japan) Shigemitsu Haga	D	6
910 Racing	910 TIB Porsche	Porsche	Porsche 993 RSR	Porsche M64/80 3.8 L F6	911	(Japan) Kiichi Takahashi	D	6

== Schedule ==
Round	Race	Circuit	Dates
1	Suzuka GT 300 km	(Japan) Suzuka Circuit	29–30 March
2	All Japan Fuji GT Race	(Japan) Fuji Speedway	3–4 May
3	Hi-Land GT Championship	(Japan) Sendai Hi-Land Raceway	28–29 June
4	Japan Special GT Cup	(Japan) Fuji Speedway	9–10 August
5	CP Mine GT Race	(Japan) Miné Circuit	4–5 October
6	Sugo GT Championship	(Japan) Sportsland SUGO	25–26 October
NC	Nicos Cup GT Allstar Race	(Japan) Twin Ring Motegi	15–16 November

== Season results ==
Drivers credited with winning Pole Position for their respective teams are indicated in bold text.

Round	Circuit	Date	Class	Pole position	Race winner
1	Suzuka Circuit	30 March	GT500	No. 37 Toyota Castrol Team	No. 2 NISMO
1	Suzuka Circuit	30 March	GT500	**(Japan) Masanori Sekiya** (Japan) Toshio Suzuki	(Japan) Aguri Suzuki (France) Érik Comas
1	Suzuka Circuit	30 March	GT300	No. 26 Team Taisan Jr.	No. 19 Racing Project Bandoh
1	Suzuka Circuit	30 March	GT300	(Japan) Keiichi Suzuki **(Japan) Morio Nitta**	(Japan) Hideo Fukuyama (Japan) Manabu Orido
2	Fuji Speedway	4 May	GT500	No. 36 Toyota Castrol Team	No. 39 Toyota Team SARD
2	Fuji Speedway	4 May	GT500	**(Germany) Michael Krumm** (Spain) Pedro de la Rosa	(Japan) Masami Kageyama (Japan) Tatsuya Tanigawa
2	Fuji Speedway	4 May	GT300	No. 19 Racing Project Bandoh	No. 26 Team Taisan Jr.
2	Fuji Speedway	4 May	GT300	**(Japan) Hideo Fukuyama** (Japan) Manabu Orido	(Japan) Keiichi Suzuki (Japan) Morio Nitta
3	Sendai Hi-Land Raceway	29 June	GT500	No. 37 Toyota Castrol Team	No. 36 Toyota Castrol Team
3	Sendai Hi-Land Raceway	29 June	GT500	(Japan) Masanori Sekiya **(Japan) Toshio Suzuki**	(Germany) Michael Krumm (Spain) Pedro de la Rosa
3	Sendai Hi-Land Raceway	29 June	GT300	No. 21 Hitotsuyama Racing	No. 25 Tsuchiya Engineering
3	Sendai Hi-Land Raceway	29 June	GT300	(Japan) Yasushi Hitotsuyama **(Japan) Kenji Yamamoto**	(Japan) Takeshi Tsuchiya (Japan) Masaoki Nagashima
4	Fuji Speedway	10 August	GT500	No. 36 Toyota Castrol Team	No. 39 Toyota Team SARD
4	Fuji Speedway	10 August	GT500	**(Germany) Michael Krumm** (Spain) Pedro de la Rosa	(Japan) Masami Kageyama (Japan) Tatsuya Tanigawa
4	Fuji Speedway	10 August	GT300	No. 25 Tsuchiya Engineering	No. 26 Team Taisan Jr.
4	Fuji Speedway	10 August	GT300	(Japan) **Takeshi Tsuchiya** (Japan) Masaoki Nagashima	(Japan) Keiichi Suzuki (Japan) Morio Nitta
5	Miné Circuit	5 October	GT500	No. 18 Mugen + Dome Project	No. 36 Toyota Castrol Team
5	Miné Circuit	5 October	GT500	**(Japan) Takuya Kurosawa** (Japan) Katsumi Yamamoto	(Germany) Michael Krumm (Spain) Pedro de la Rosa
5	Miné Circuit	5 October	GT300	No. 6 Kraft	No. 19 Racing Project Bandoh
5	Miné Circuit	5 October	GT300	**(Japan) Hiroki Katoh** (Japan) Takahiro Fujita	(Japan) Hideo Fukuyama (Japan) Manabu Orido
6	Sportsland SUGO	26 October	GT500	No. 100 Team Kunimitsu with Mooncraft	No. 5 Team 5Zigen
6	Sportsland SUGO	26 October	GT500	(Japan) Kunimitsu Takahashi **(Japan) Akira Iida**	(Japan) Eiichi Tajima (Belgium) Marc Goossens
6	Sportsland SUGO	26 October	GT300	No. 25 Tsuchiya Engineering	No. 71 Sigmatech Racing Team
6	Sportsland SUGO	26 October	GT300	(Japan) **Takeshi Tsuchiya** (Japan) Masaoki Nagashima	(Japan) Kaoru Hoshino (Japan) Masaki Jyonai
NC	Twin Ring Motegi	Race 1–16 November	GT500	No. 2 NISMO	No. 2 NISMO
NC	Twin Ring Motegi	Race 1–16 November	GT500	(Japan) Aguri Suzuki **(France) Érik Comas**	(Japan) Aguri Suzuki (France) Érik Comas
NC	Twin Ring Motegi	Race 1–16 November	GT300	No. 910 910 Racing	No. 27 Ferrari Club of Japan
NC	Twin Ring Motegi	Race 1–16 November	GT300	(Japan) Seiichi Sodeyama **(Japan) Hideyuki Tamamoto**	(Japan) Tetsuya Ota (Sweden) Anders Olofsson
NC	Twin Ring Motegi	Race 2–16 November	GT500	No. 2 NISMO	No. 2 NISMO
NC	Twin Ring Motegi	Race 2–16 November	GT500	(Japan) Aguri Suzuki (France) Érik Comas	(Japan) Aguri Suzuki (France) Érik Comas
NC	Twin Ring Motegi	Race 2–16 November	GT300	No. 27 Ferrari Club of Japan	No. 27 Ferrari Club of Japan
NC	Twin Ring Motegi	Race 2–16 November	GT300	(Japan) Tetsuya Ota (Sweden) Anders Olofsson	(Japan) Tetsuya Ota (Sweden) Anders Olofsson

== Point ranking ==
=== GT500 class ===
==== Drivers ====
Rank	Driver	No.	SUZ (Japan)	FUJ (Japan)	SEN (Japan)	FUJ (Japan)	MIN (Japan)	SUG (Japan)	MOT (Japan)	MOT (Japan)	Pts.
1	(Spain) Pedro de la Rosa (Germany) Michael Krumm	No. 36 Toyota Castrol Team	13	3	1	2	1	15			67
2	(Japan) Masami Kageyama	No. 39 Toyota Team SARD	2	1	5	1	13	7	Ret	Ret	67
3	(Japan) Toshio Suzuki	No. 37 Toyota Castrol Team	3	6	3	3	3	4	3	2	64
3	(Japan) Masanori Sekiya	No. 37 Toyota Castrol Team	3	6	3	3	3	4			64
3	(Japan) Masanori Sekiya	No. 36 Toyota Castrol Team							Ret	5	64
4	(Japan) Aguri Suzuki	No. 2 NISMO	1	4	2	10	9	3	1	1	60
5	(Japan) Tatsuya Tanigawa	No. 39 Toyota Team SARD		1	5	1	13	7	Ret	Ret	52
6	(France) Érik Comas	No. 2 NISMO	1		2	10	9	3	1	1	50
7	(Japan) Masahiro Hasemi (Japan) Tetsuya Tanaka	No. 3 Hasemi Motorsports	4	2	9	6	7	Ret	4	3	37
8	(Japan) Eiichi Tajima	No. 5 Team 5Zigen	6	Ret	6	Ret	12	1	7	10	32
8	(Belgium) Marc Goossens	No. 5 Team 5Zigen	6	Ret	6	Ret	12	1			32
9	(Japan) Kunimitsu Takahashi (Japan) Akira Iida	No. 100 Team Kunimitsu with Mooncraft		Ret	16	11	2	2	10	11	30
10	(Japan) Hironori Takeuchi (Japan) Katsutomo Kaneishi	No. 38 Toyota Castrol Team	7	9	4	8	5	10	2	4	28
11	(Japan) Satoshi Motoyama	No. 12 Hoshino Racing	Ret	5	15	4	6	14			24
12	(Japan) Naoki Nagasaka	No. 8 Power Craft			7		4	6			20
13	(Japan) Kazuyoshi Hoshino	No. 12 Hoshino Racing	Ret		15	4	6	14	Ret	6	16
14	(France) Olivier Grouillard	No. 39 Toyota Team SARD	2								15
15	(France) Bertrand Gachot (France) Paul Belmondo	No. 8 Power Craft	10	Ret							12
15	(France) Bertrand Gachot (France) Paul Belmondo	No. 510 Ryowa House Pacific Team Cerumo			8	5	11				12
16	(Japan) Takuya Kurosawa (Japan) Katsumi Yamamoto	No. 18 Mugen + Dome Project		Ret	Ret	Ret	8	5	8	9	11
17	(Italy) Marco Apicella	No. 2 NISMO		4							10
17	(Denmark) Tom Kristensen	No. 8 Power Craft				15	4				10
19	(Japan) Masahiko Kageyama (Japan) Masahiko Kondo	No. 556 NISMO	5	Ret	14	9	Ret	Ret	Ret	7	10
20	(Australia) Wayne Gardner	No. 8 Power Craft			7	15		6			10
21	(Japan) Fuminori Mizuno	No. 12 Hoshino Racing		5							8
22	(Japan) Mitsuhiro Kinoshita	No. 13 Endless Sports	8	Ret	11	7	10	12			8
23	(Japan) Mitsuo Fujimura	No. 13 Endless Sports		Ret	11	7	10	12			5
24	(Japan) Kaoru Iida (Republic of Ireland) Ralph Firman	No. 10 Team TMS	12	7	13	13		DNQ			4
25	(Japan) Keiichi Tsuchiya (Japan) Hideshi Matsuda	No. 34 Team Taisan with Advan			10	Ret	14	8	6	Ret	4
26	(Japan) Yoji Yamada (Japan) Kazuo Mogi	No. 30 Team Take One	9	Ret	12	12	11	9	5	8	4
27	(Japan) Tatsuhiko Kanaumi (Japan) Mitsutake Koma	No. 4 Suzuki Bankin	11	8	DNQ	16		DNQ			3
27	(Japan) Yasushi Kikuchi	No. 13 Endless Sports	8								3
	(Japan) Takao Wada (Japan) Hisashi Wada	No. 88 JLOC Corsa		Ret	Ret	14	Ret	13	9	Ret	0
	(Japan) Masato Yamamoto (Japan) Katsuhiko Okamoto	No. 47 Susuki Racing Mechanics				Ret					0
	(Japan) Shingo Tachi	No. 37 Toyota Castrol Team							3	2	0
	(Japan) Ukyo Katayama	No. 36 Toyota Castrol Team							Ret	5	0
	(Japan) Takeshi Tsuchiya	No. 12 Hoshino Racing							Ret	6	0
	(Japan) Hiro Matsushita	No. 5 Team 5Zigen							7	10	0
Rank	Driver	No.	SUZ (Japan)	FUJ (Japan)	SEN (Japan)	FUJ (Japan)	MIN (Japan)	SUG (Japan)	MOT (Japan)	MOT (Japan)	Pts.

==== GT500 Teams' standings ====
For teams that entered multiple cars, only the best result from each round counted towards the teams' points.

Rank	Team	No.	SUZ (Japan)	FUJ (Japan)	SEN (Japan)	FUJ (Japan)	MIN (Japan)	SUG (Japan)	MOT (Japan)	MOT (Japan)	PTS
1	Toyota Castrol Team	36	13	3	1	2	1	15	Ret	5	79
1	Toyota Castrol Team	37	3	6	3	3	3	4	3	2	79
1	Toyota Castrol Team	38	7	9	4	8	5	10	2	4	79
2	Toyota Team SARD	39	2	1	5	1	13	7	Ret	Ret	67
3	Nismo	2	1	4	2	10	9	3	1	1	61
3	Nismo	556	5	Ret	14	9	Ret	Ret	Ret	7	61
4	Hasemi Motorsports	3	4	2	9	6	7	Ret	4	3	37
5	Team 5Zigen	5	6	Ret	6	Ret	12	1	7	10	32
6	Team Kunimitsu with Mooncraft	100		Ret	16	11	2	2	10	11	30
7	Calsonic Hoshino Racing	12	Ret	5	15	4	6	14	Ret	6	24
8	Power Craft	8	11	Ret	7	15	4	6			21
9	Ryowa House Pacific Team Cerumo	510			8	5	Ret	11			11
9	Mugen + Dome Project	18		Ret	Ret	Ret	8	5	8	9	11
11	Endless Sports	13	8	Ret	11	7	10	12			8
12	Team TMS	10	13	7	13	13		DNQ			4
13	Team Taisan Advan	34			10	Ret	14	8	6	Ret	4
14	Team Take One	30	9	Ret	12	12	11	9	5	8	4
15	Suzuki Bankin	4	12	8	DNQ	Ret	DNA	DNQ			3
-	Team Le Mans	75	10	DNS							0
-	JLOC	88		Ret	Ret	14	Ret	13	9	Ret	0
-	Suzuki Racing Mechanics	47				Ret					0
Rank	Team	No.	SUZ (Japan)	FUJ (Japan)	SEN (Japan)	FUJ (Japan)	MIN (Japan)	SUG (Japan)	MOT (Japan)	MOT (Japan)	PTS

=== GT300 Drivers' championship ===
Rank	No.	Driver	SUZ (Japan)	FUJ (Japan)	SEN (Japan)	FUJ (Japan)	MIN (Japan)	SUG (Japan)	MOT (Japan)	MOT (Japan)	Pts.
1	19	(Japan) Manabu Orido (Japan) Hideo Fukuyama	1	2	2	3	1	5	2	9	90
2	26	(Japan) Keiichi Suzuki (Japan) Morio Nitta	4	1	3	1	3	2	DNS	DNS	89
3	25/72	(Japan) Masaoki Nagashima	3	Ret	1	5	Ret	3	Ret	7	52
3	25	(Japan) Takeshi Tsuchiya	3	Ret	1	5		3			52
5	71	(Japan) Kaoru Hoshino (Japan) Masaki Jouchi	DNA	6	7	6	2	1	5	4	51
6	910	(Japan) Seiichi Sodeyama	2	8	4	4	12	12	4	3	38
7	27/28	(Japan) Tetsuya Ota	11	4	9	2	7	Ret	1	1	31
8	7	(Japan) Shinichi Yamaji (Japan) Haruhiko Matsumoto	Ret	3	5	Ret	10	4	6	10	31
9	27	(Sweden) Anders Olofsson	11	4		2	DNA		1	1	25
10	51	(Japan) Katsunori Iketani	5	5	DNQ	7	DNA	9			22
10	51	(Japan) Masamitsu Ishihara	5	5		7	DNA	9			22
11	81	(Japan) Nobuyuki Ohyagi	8	7	6	Ret	Ret	8	3	2	16
12	910	(Japan) Kiyoshi Misaki	2								15
13	910/57	(Japan) Tomohiko Sunako		8	4			18			13
14	21/81	(Japan) Takayuki Kinoshita	Ret	7	6	Ret	Ret	8	3	2	13
15	72	(Japan) Takeshi Asami	7	9	8	8	Ret	DNQ			12
15	72	(Japan) Norio Makiguchi	7	9	8	8		DNQ			12
17	57/910	(Japan) Hideyuki Tamamoto		DNS		4	12	12	4	3	10
17	60	(Japan) Kumi Sato (Japan) Minoru Tanaka				16	4	16	Ret	5	10
19	20	(Japan) Kenji Takahashi (Japan) Hiroaki Suga	Ret	Ret	11	9	5	11			10
20	70	(Japan) Yoshizo Ishibashi (Japan) Nobuo Komiya	10	Ret	Ret	10	6	17			8
21	9	(Japan) Tsunefumi Hioki (Japan) Masaharu Kinoshita	6	DNA							6
21	6	(Japan) Hiroki Kato (Japan) Takahiro Fujita	Ret	Ret	Ret	11	Ret	6			6
23	21	(Japan) Yasushi Hitotsuyama	Ret	10		Ret		7			5
24	21	(Japan) Mizuno Fuminori					Ret	7			4
25	81	(Japan) Tsuneaki Mankumo	8								3
25	16	(Japan) Motoji Sekine	15	15	12	12	8	13			3
27	777	(Japan) Katsuya Makita (Japan) Katsuharu Shiomi	9								2
27	27	(Sweden) Steven Andskär			9			Ret			2
27	91	(Japan) Masahiro Matsunaga (Japan) Junko Mihara	13	14	14	14	9	Ret	DNS	6	2
30	21	(Japan) Kenji Yamamoto		10	10	Ret					2
31	21	(Japan) Mikio Hitotsuyama			10		Ret				1
31	54	(Japan) Nobuyuki Tanaka (Japan) Kazushige Saito						10			1
NC	28	(Japan) Masami Sugiyama		Ret	13	15	7				0
NC	55	(Japan) Toshihiro Fukazawa (Japan) Masaaki Nagashima	12	11	Ret	13		15			0
NC	17	(Japan) Toshihiko Nogami	14	12	DNQ	Ret		Ret	7	8	0
NC	17	(Japan) Tomoyuki Hosono		12	DNQ	Ret		Ret	7	8	0
NC	16	(Japan) Hiroyuki Iiri	15	15	12						0
NC	79	(Japan) Masanori Sugiyama (Japan) Hiroyasu Aoyagi		13		19	DNA				0
NC	28	(Japan) Masahiro Yamazaki		Ret	13	15		Ret			0
NC	17	(Japan) Toshiaki Koshimizu	14								0
NC	911	(Japan) Shigemitsu Haga (Japan) Kiichi Takahashi						14			0
NC	45	(Japan) Takeshi Yuasa (Japan) Kiyoaki Hanai	16	Ret							0
NC	11	(Japan) Hiromoto Ishimori (Japan) Kinji Suzuki		16							0
NC	333	(Japan) Masatomo Shimizu	Ret	DNA		17		DNQ			0
NC	333	(Japan) Shigekazu Saeki				17					0
NC	15	(Japan) Takeshi Odagiri (Japan) Takatoshi Onoda				18					0
NC	57	(Japan) Akira Yoshitomi						18			0
NC	333	(Japan) Yoshimi Katayama	Ret	DNA							0
NC	77	(Japan) Katsuo Kobayashi (Japan) Naohiro Furuya						Ret			0
NC	28	(Belgium) Patrick van Schote						Ret			0
NC	57	(Japan) Michiko Okuyama		DNS							0
NC	24	(Japan) Toshiyuki Hirano (Japan) Hisanori Kuboyama				DNS					0
NC	51	(Japan) Tetsuhumi Toda			DNQ						0
NC	333	(Japan) Fumihito Sakamoto						DNQ			0
NC	25	(Japan) Sakae Obata							Ret	7	0
Rank	No.	Driver	SUZ (Japan)	FUJ (Japan)	SEN (Japan)	FUJ (Japan)	MIN (Japan)	SUG (Japan)	MOT (Japan)	MOT (Japan)	Pts.

==== GT300 Teams' standings ====
For teams that entered multiple cars, only the best result from each round counted towards the teams' championship.

Rank	Team	No.	SUZ (Japan)	FUJ (Japan)	SEN (Japan)	FUJ (Japan)	MIN (Japan)	SUG (Japan)	MOT (Japan)	MOT (Japan)	Pts.
1	RS-R Racing with Bandoh	19	1	2	2	3	1	5	2	9	90
2	Team Taisan Jr.	26	4	1	3	1	3	2	DNS	DNS	89
3	Tsuchiya Engineering	25	3	Ret	1	5		3	Ret	7	52
4	SigmaTec Racing Team	71	DNA	6	7	6	2	1	5	4	51
5	910 Racing	910	2	8	4	4	12	12	4	3	38
5	910 Racing	911						14			38
6	Team Ferrari Club of Japan	27	11	4	9	2	DNA	Ret	1	1	31
6	Team Ferrari Club of Japan	28		Ret	13	15	7	Ret			31
7	RE Amemiya Racing	7	Ret	3	5	Ret	10	4	6	10	31
8	Cobra Racing Team	51	5	5	DNQ	7	DNA	9			22
9	KRAFT	6	Ret	Ret	Ret	11	Ret	6			16
9	KRAFT	60				16	4	16	Ret	5	16
10	Team Daishin	81	8	7	6	Ret	Ret	8	3	2	16
11	Makiguchi Engineering	72	7	9	8	8	Ret	DNQ			12
12	AI Auto Racing	20	Ret	Ret	11	9	5	11			10
13	Team Gaikokuya	70	10	Ret	Ret	10	6	17			7
14	Team 5ZIGEN	9	6	DNA							6
15	Hitotsuyama Racing	21	Ret	10	10	Ret	Ret	7			6
16	Team Power Magic	16	15	15	12	12	8	13			3
17	Tackle & RS Matsumoto	777	9								2
17	First Racing Team	91	13	14	14	14	9	Ret	DNS	6	2
19	S.D.R.	54						10			1
-	Sports Factory Racing	55	12	11	DNS	Ret	13	15			0
-	Kageisen Racing Team	17	14	12	DNQ	Ret		Ret	7	8	0
-	NAC West	79		13		19	DNA				0
-	Signal	45	16	Ret							0
-	M Factory Racing	11		16							0
-	Shimizu Racing Enterprise	333	Ret	DNA		17		DNQ			0
-	Kamco Works	15				18					0
-	ecurie SiFo	57		DNS				18			0
-	Cusco Racing	77						Ret			0
-	Hirano Motorsport	24				DNS					0
Rank	Team	No.	SUZ (Japan)	FUJ (Japan)	SEN (Japan)	FUJ (Japan)	MIN (Japan)	SUG (Japan)	MOT (Japan)	MOT (Japan)	Pts.
