= Takeshi Tsuchiya =

Japanese racing driver

Takeshi Tsuchiya (土屋 武士, Tsuchiya Takeshi; born November 4, 1972) is a Japanese professional race car driver.

== Racing Record ==
=== Complete Japanese Formula 3 results ===
(key) (Races in bold indicate pole position) (Races in italics indicate fastest lap)

Year	Team	Engine	1	2	3	4	5	6	7	8	9	10	DC	Pts
1994	Team Cerumo	Toyota	SUZ; Ret										13th	2
1994	Toel	Toyota		FUJ; 16	TSU; 19	SUZ; 9	SEN; 8	TOK; 17	MIN; 9	TAI; 11	SUG; 5	SUZ; 9	13th	2
1995	Endless Sports	Toyota	SUZ; 6	TSU; 14	MIN	SUZ; 9	TAI; 7	SUG	FUJ; 10	SUZ; 11	SEN		?	1
1996	Team Nova / Carisma Ralliart	HKS	SUZ; 9	TSU; 16	MIN; DNS	FUJ; 7	SUZ; 6	SUG; 5	SEN; 3	SUZ; DNS	FUJ; C		6th	7
1997	Team Nova / Carisma Ralliart	HKS	**SUZ**; 3	TSU; 2	MIN; 1	FUJ; 1	SUZ; 6	SUG; 3	SEN; Ret	MOT; 3	FUJ; C	SUZ; 6	**3rd**	**31**
2000	Pal Sport	Nissan	SUZ; 3	TSU; DNS	FUJ	MIN; 14	TAI; Ret	SUZ; Ret	SUG; 12	MOT; 17	SEN; 4	SUZ; 5	8th	9

=== 24 Hours of Le Mans results ===
Year	Team	Co-Drivers	Car	Class	Laps	Pos.	Class Pos.
1998	(France) Courage Compétition	(France) Patrice Gay (Sweden) Fredrik Ekblom	Courage C51	LMP1	126	DNF	DNF

=== Complete Formula Nippon results ===
(key) (Races in bold indicate pole position) (Races in italics indicate fastest lap)

Year	Team	1	2	3	4	5		6		7		8	9	10	DC	Pts
2000	Olympic KONDO Racing Team	SUZ	MOT	MIN	FUJ	SUZ		SUG		MOT		FUJ	MIN; 10	SUZ	NC	0
2001	Autobacs Racing Team Aguri	SUZ; 10	MOT; 11	MIN; 3	FUJ; Ret	SUZ; 3		SUG; Ret		FUJ; 14		MIN; 2	MOT; 6	SUZ; 5	8th	17
2002	Team LeMans	SUZ; 2	FUJ; 6	MIN; 3	**SUZ**; Ret	MOT; 2		**SUG**; 4		**FUJ**; Ret		**MIN**; 7	MOT; 6	SUZ; 2	4th	27
2003	Forum eng, ARTA Team LeMans	SUZ; 14	FUJ; Ret	MIN; 2	MOT; 4	SUZ; 5		SUG; 7		FUJ; 6		MIN; 12	MOT; 6	SUZ; 4	8th	16
2004	Team LeMans	SUZ; 11	SUG; 10	MOT; 7	SUZ; 11	SUG; 9		MIN; 5		SEP; Ret		MOT; Ret	SUZ; 5		13th	4
2005	Forum Engineering Team LeMans	MOT; 5	SUZ; Ret	SUG; 4	FUJ; Ret	SUZ; Ret		MIN; 5		FUJ; 5		MOT; 3	SUG; Ret		8th	13
2006	DHG TOM'S RACING	FUJ; 9	SUZ; 10	MOT; Ret	SUZ; 7	AUT; 9		FUJ; Ret		SUG; 8		MOT; 8	SUZ; 5		13th	2
2008	DoCoMo TEAM DANDELION RACING	FUJ; 8	SUZ; 14	MOT; 14	OKA; 12	SUZ; 1; 16	SUZ; 2 Ret	MOT; 1; 8	**MOT**; **2**; 14	FUJ; 1; 11	FUJ; 2; 11	SUG; 14			17th	4

=== Complete JGTC/Super GT Results ===
(key) (Races in bold indicate pole position) (Races in italics indicate fastest lap)

Year	Team	Car	Class	1	2	3	4	5	6	7	8	9	DC	Pts
1995	Team Taisan	Porsche 911 GT2	GT1	SUZ	FUJ; 7	SEN	FUJ; 5	SUG	MIN				24th	4
1996	Team Taisan	Porsche 911 GT2	GT500	SUZ; 12	FUJ; 7	SEN; Ret	FUJ; DNQ						20th	4
1996	Team Taisan Jr.	Toyota MR2	GT300					SUG; 4					12th	18
1996	Imuraya Racing Team	Toyota MR2	GT300						MIN; 5				12th	18
1997	Tsuchiya Engineering	Toyota MR2	GT300	SUZ; 3	FUJ; Ret	SEN; 1	FUJ; 5	MIN	SUG; 3				**3rd**	**52**
1998	Autobacs Racing Team Aguri	Nissan Skyline GT-R	GT500	SUZ; 13	FUJ; C	SEN; 11	FUJ; 6	MOT; 6	MIN; 9	SUG; 8			12th	17
1999	Nismo	Nissan Silvia	GT300	SUZ; 9	FUJ; Ret	SUG; 1	MIN; 1	FUJ; Ret	TAI; 1	MOT; 4			**2nd**	**72**
2000	Toyota Castrol Team TOM'S	Toyota Supra	GT500	MOT; Ret	FUJ; 12	SUG; 9	FUJ; 5	TAI; 14	MIN; Ret	SUZ; 9			17th	12
2001	Toyota Team TOM'S	Toyota Supra	GT500	TAI; 11	FUJ; 10	SUG; 8	FUJ; 8	MOT; 5	SUZ; 5	MIN; 7			12th	27
2002	Toyota Team TOM'S	Toyota Supra	GT500	TAI; 8	FUJ; 14	SUG; 10	SEP; 2	FUJ; 5	MOT; 6	MIN; 3	SUZ; 9		7th	52
2003	Toyota Team TOM'S	Toyota Supra	GT500	TAI; 6	FUJ; 10	SUG; 2	FUJ; 7	FUJ; 5	**MOT**; 2	AUT; 8	SUZ; 8		5th	61
2004	Toyota Team TOM'S	Toyota Supra	GT500	TAI; 7	SUG; 7	SEP; 10	TOK; 4	MOT; 5	AUT; 7	**SUZ**; 2			7th	43
2005	Toyota Team TOM'S	Toyota Supra	GT500	OKA; 2	FUJ; 10	SEP; 3	SUG; 3	MOT; 7	FUJ; 5	AUT; 8	SUZ; 5		4th	60
2006	Toyota Team Tsuchiya	Toyota Supra	GT500	SUZ; 8	OKA; 9	FUJ; 6	SEP; 10	SUG; 12	SUZ; Ret	MOT; 12	AUT; 15	FUJ; 9	19th	18
2007	Toyota Team Tsuchiya	Lexus SC430	GT500	SUZ; 9	OKA; 6	FUJ; Ret	SEP; 5	SUG; 8	SUZ; Ret	MOT; 8	AUT; 10	FUJ; 12	17th	20
2008	Toyota Team Tsuchiya	Lexus SC430	GT500	SUZ; 11	OKA; 11	FUJ; 8	SEP; 4	SUG; 4	SUZ; 14	MOT; 10	AUT; 12	FUJ; 8	15th	23
2009	Team Nova	Aston Martin DBR9	GT500	OKA; 14	SUZ	FUJ; 14	SEP	SUG	SUZ	FUJ; 14	AUT	MOT	NC	0
2010	Samurai Team Tsuchiya	Porsche 911 GT3RSR	GT300	SUZ	OKA	FUJ; 7	SEP	SUG; 4	SUZ; Ret	FUJ; C	MOT; 6		13th	17
2011	Samurai Team Tsuchiya	Porsche 911 GT3RSR	GT300	OKA; Ret	FUJ; 3	SEP; Ret	SUG; 4	SUZ; 9	FUJ; 5	AUT; 5	MOT; 19		9th	33
2012	Team Art Taste	Porsche 911 GT3-R	GT300	OKA; 5	FUJ; Ret	SEP	SUG	SUZ					18th	8
2012	Green Tec & Leon with Shift	Mercedes-Benz SLS AMG GT3	GT300						FUJ; DNS	AUT	MOT		18th	8
2013	Okinawa-IMP Racing with Shift	Mercedes-Benz SLS AMG GT3	GT300	OKA; 4	FUJ; 4	SEP; 12	SUG; 4	SUZ; 2	FUJ; 10	AUT; 3	MOT; 7		5th	60
2014	R'Qs MotorSports	Mercedes-Benz SLS AMG GT3	GT300	OKA; 20	FUJ; 11	AUT; 17	SUG	FUJ	SUZ				NC	0
2014	Toyota Team Thailand	Toyota 86 MC	GT300							CHA; 14	MOT		NC	0
2015	VivaC team Tsuchiya	Toyota 86 MC	GT300	OKA; 6	FUJ; Ret	**CHA**; 7	FUJ; 5	SUZ; 23	SUG; 1	AUT; Ret	MOT; 12		10th	35
2016	VivaC team Tsuchiya	Toyota 86 MC	GT300	**OKA**; 6	FUJ; 3	**SUG**; 2	FUJ; 13	SUZ; 22	**CHA**; 1	MOT; 7	MOT; 1		**1st**	**78**
2018	Tsuchiya Engineering	Toyota 86 MC	GT300	OKA	FUJ; Ret	SUZ	CHA	FUJ	SUG	AUT	MOT		NC	0
2019	Tsuchiya Engineering	Toyota 86 MC	GT300	OKA	FUJ; 18	SUZ	CHA	FUJ; 26	AUT	SUG	MOT		NC	0
