= Shingo Tachi =

Japanese racing driver

Shingo, from a Vauxhall Junior Team poster from 1995

Shingo Tachi (舘 信吾, Tachi Shingo; September 1, 1977 – March 11, 1999) was a Japanese racing driver, the son of Nobuhide Tachi (舘 信秀), founder and head of TOM's, the motorsport side of Toyota.

== Racing career ==
Tachi raced in British Formula Vauxhall with Rowan Racing in 1994 and 1995 before switching to British Formula 3 in 1996 with a Dallara-Toyota prepared by Team Magic Racing. He had a good season finishing second in Class B. He returned to race in the Japanese F3 series in 1997 and 1998 finishing third.

Tachi also won the All-Japan Grand Touring Car Championship (JGTC) GT300 class championship in 1998, driving a Toyota MR2 for Team Taisan Jr. with Tsuchiya Engineering. Partnered with veteran co-driver Keiichi Suzuki, Tachi won a record five out of six races in 1998, and scored 106 points en route to winning the title.

== Death ==
Tachi was killed in 1999 while testing a GT500 category Toyota Supra at the TI Circuit, in Okayama, Japan. There was a technical failure and Tachi failed to slow down for the first corner, crashing into the tyre wall at unabated speed. He suffered massive chest injuries from the steering wheel and died an hour later. Before his death, Tachi had signed for Team LeMans in JGTC alongside former Formula One driver Hideki Noda, and was also set to make his Formula Nippon debut for Team TMS.

== Complete JGTC Results ==
Year	Team	Car	Class	1	2	3	4	5	6	7	DC	Pts
1998	Team Taisan Jr with Tsuchiya	Toyota MR2	GT300	SUZ; 1	FUJ; C	SEN; 1	FUJ; 1	MOT; 6	MIN; 1	SUG; 1	1st	106
