= Keiichi Suzuki (racing driver) =

Japanese racing driver

Keiichi Suzuki (鈴木恵一, Suzuki Keiichi, born 21 March 1949) is a former Japanese racing driver. In 1996 and 1998 Suzuki won the GT300 class in the Japan Grand Touring Car Championship. He retired in 1999 following the death of his teammate Shingo Tachi in a testing crash at the TI Circuit and has since worked with the Hankook KTR team in Super GT.

== Racing record ==
=== Complete Japanese Touring Car Championship (1994-) results ===
Year	Team	Car	1	2	3	4	5	6	7	8	9	10	11	12	13	14	15	16	17	18	DC	Pts
1994	Tsuchiya Engineering	Toyota Corolla Ceres	AUT; 1; 6	AUT; 2; 8	SUG; 1	SUG; 2	TOK; 1; 5	TOK; 2; 5	SUZ; 1	SUZ; 2	MIN; 1 Ret	MIN; 2; 4	AID; 1	AID; 2	TSU; 1 Ret	TSU; 2 DNS	SEN; 1	SEN; 2	FUJ; 1 DNS	FUJ; 2 DNS	12th	27

=== Complete JGTC Results ===
Year	Team	Car	Class	1	2	3	4	5	6	7	DC	Pts
1994	Team Taisan	Ferrari F40	GT1	FUJ; 3	SEN	FUJ; 3	SUG	MIN; 8			11th	27
1995	Team Taisan	Porsche 911 GT2	GT1	SUZ; Ret	FUJ; 7	SEN; 8	FUJ; Ret	SUG	MIN; 1		20th	7
1996	Team Taisan Jr	Porsche 964	GT300	SUZ; 1	FUJ; 2	SEN; Ret	FUJ; 2	SUG; 1	MIN; 1		1st	90
1997	Team Taisan Jr	Porsche 964	GT300	SUZ; 4	FUJ; 1	SEN; 3	FUJ; 1	MIN; 3	SUG; 2		2nd	89
1998	Team Taisan Jr with Tsuchiya	Toyota MR2	GT300	SUZ; 1	FUJ; C	SEN; 1	FUJ; 1	MOT; 6	MIN; 1	SUG; 1	1st	106
