= Tsuchiya Engineering =

Japanese racecar team

(Japan) Tsuchiya Engineering
- Founded: 1971
- Base: Fujisawa, Kanagawa, Japan
- Team principal(s): Takeshi Tsuchiya
- Founder(s): Haruo Tsuchiya
- Current series: Super GT
- Former series: Japanese Formula 3 Championship; Japan Formula 4 Super Taikyu
- Current drivers: (Japan) Takamitsu Matsui; (Japan) Ryota Horachi
- Teams' Championships: JGTC – GT300: 1998; 1999; Super GT – GT300; 2016
- Drivers' Championships: JGTC – GT300: 1998: Keiichi Suzuki & Shingo Tachi; 1999: Morio Nitta; Super GT – GT300: 2016: Takeshi Tsuchiya & Takamitsu Matsui
- Website: http://tsuchiya25.com

Tsuchiya Engineering is a Japanese motor racing team based in Fujisawa, Kanagawa, which competes in the GT300 class of Super GT.

A long-time Toyota-fielding team in Super GT, the team won three drivers' and teams' titles in the GT300 class, as well as two Japanese Touring Car Championship teams' titles in Division-3.

== History ==
=== Origins and first stint in Super GT (1971–2008) ===
Haruo Tsuchiya (1945-2021), a former motocross rider, worked at TOMEI Automotive from 1968 to 1971 to create his own shop and team. The team initially competed in local touring car races, before entering JTC, where it won the Division-3 title twice, in 1989 and 1990. Tsuchiya entered JGTC in 1997 with a Toyota MR2 and won its first title in 1998, after winning five out of six races with Shingo Tachi and Keiichi Suzuki behind the wheel. The following year, the team partnered with A'PEX and scored a lone win at Fuji and two more podiums to secure the drivers' title with Morio Nitta, as well as taking their second consecutive teams' title.

Entering GT500 in 2000, the team fielded a Toyota Supra until 2006, before fielding a Lexus SC430 for the following two years. In their nine-year stint in the category, the team scored five podiums, including their only win at Okayama in 2005. At the end of the 2008 season, the team suspended its motorsport activities in 2009 due to the economic recession and the reduction of manufacturer support.

=== Team Samurai and Return to Super GT (2010–present) ===
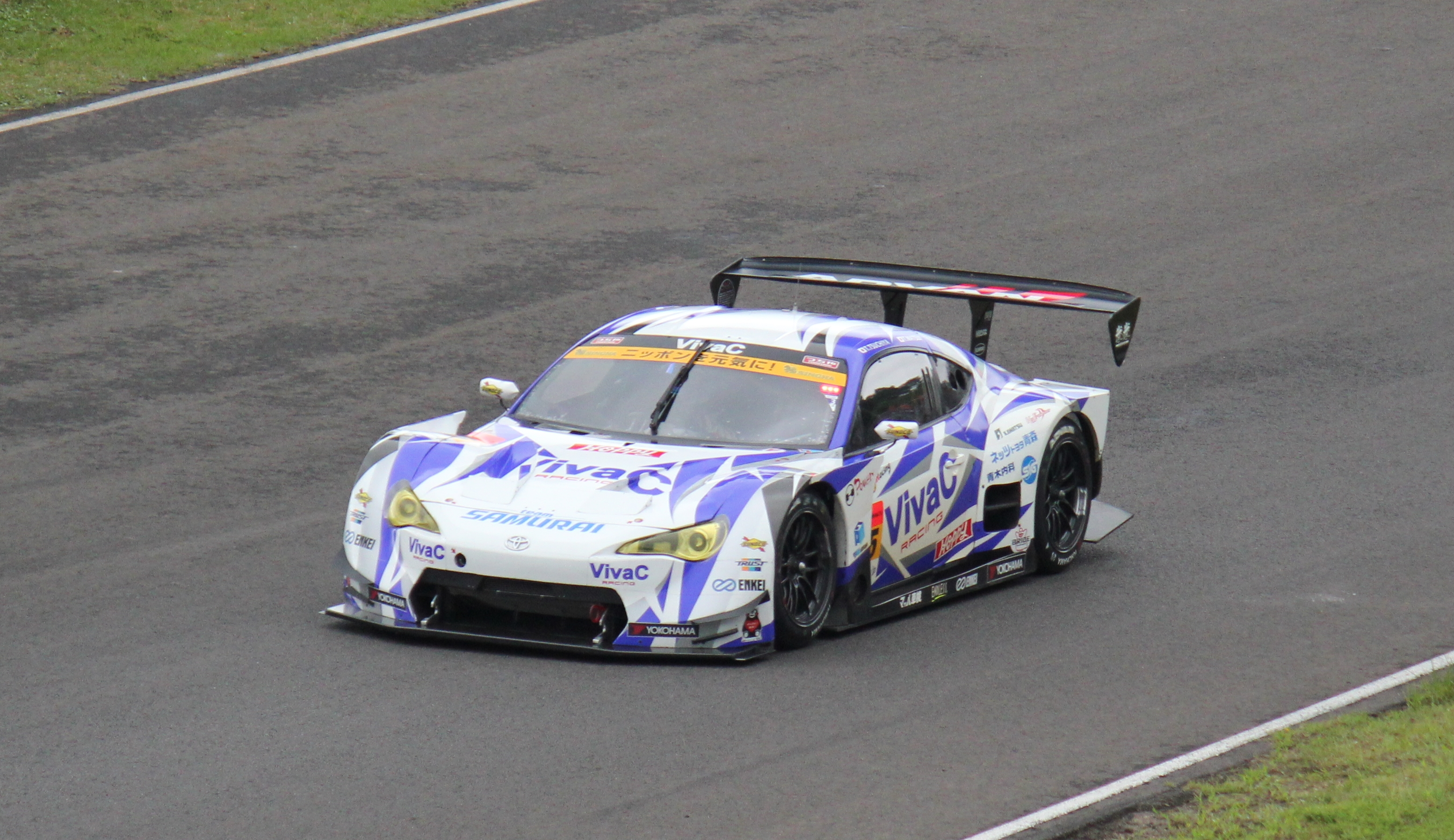
Takeshi Tsuchiya and Takamitsu Matsui's title winning car at Suzuka in 2016.

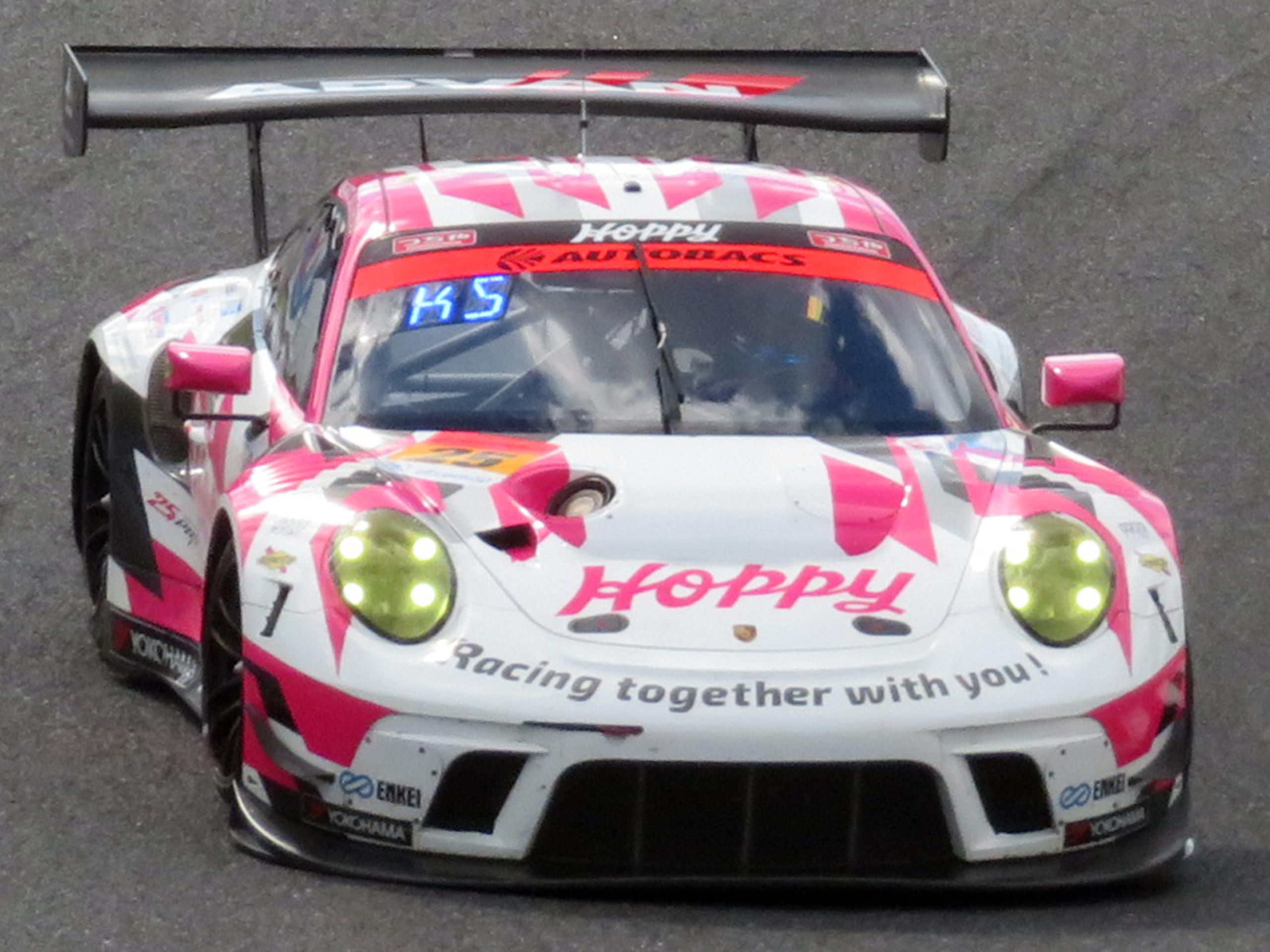
Hoppy Porsche at 2020 Fujimaki Group Suzuka 300km

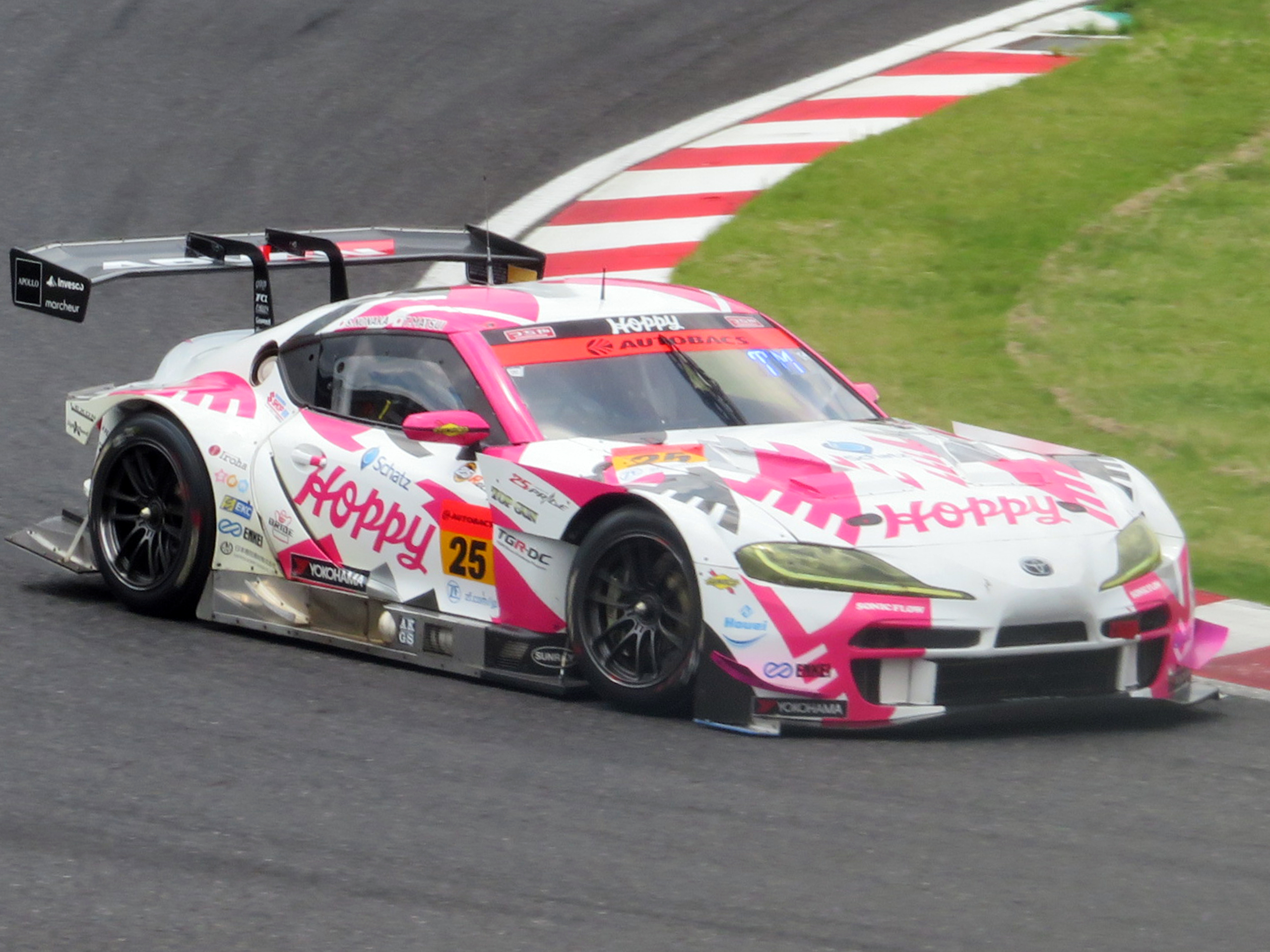
Hoppy schatz GR Supra GT at 2022 Takanoko no Hotel Suzuka GT 300km

Haruo's son Takeshi, founded 25 Racing/Team Samurai in 2010, with his father as manager. Across the next four years, the team competed in Super GT until 2011, before then competing in Porsche Carrera Cup Japan, Super Taikyu and JAF Formula 4. In 2015, Tsuchiya Engineering made their return to GT300 competition, with Takeshi Tsuchiya and Takamitsu Matsui driving a Toyota 86 MC GT300. In the team's first full season since 2011, the Tsuchiya-Matsui pairing won at Sportsland SUGO and qualified on pole at Buriram to end the season ninth in points. Retaining both Tsuchiya and Matsui for 2016, the pair scored wins at Buriram and Motegi to secure their third drivers' and teams' titles. Ten days after the season-finale, Haruo was diagnosed with oral cancer, and as a result Takeshi retired from full-time racing to take over the running of the team.

For the team's title defence, Matsui remained for a third consecutive season as Kenta Yamashita replaced Tsuchiya as the team's second driver. In their only season together, the Matsui-Yamashita pair won at Autopolis and finished third at Sportsland SUGO to secure sixth in the teams' standings. Matsui remained with the team as the sole full-time driver for the 2017 season, finishing third at Okayama and second at Suzuka alongside Sho Tsuboi as the team ended the year eighth in points. In 2019, Matsui remained with the team as he was joined by Kimiya Sato, as they scored a best result of fourth at Buriram and qualified on pole three times to end the year 18th in points.

Ahead of 2020, the team switched to a Porsche 911, fielding it until 2021, scoring a best result of fifth at Motegi in the latter year, before the team switched to a self-built Toyota GR Supra. In their first year with the Supra, the team scored a single points finish at Sportsland SUGO, by finishing tenth, to end the year 34th in the teams' standings in a season in which they missed the second Fuji round following a testing crash at Suzuka.

In 2023, at the fourth round of the season at Fuji, both Tsuchiya-ran cars caught fire, leading to both cars withdrawing from the following event and the rest of the season. Tsuchiya then started a fundraiser known as the "Hopico Revival Project" in order to help the team return to racing. The team returned to GT300 competition in the following year with Takamitsu Matsui and Togo Suganami, with a rebuilt version of "Hopico".

=== Partnership with Max Racing (2020–2023) ===
Before the 2020 Super GT season it was announced that Tsuchiya Engineering would support series newcomers Max Racing, by servicing their car. The partnership lasted until the 2023 Fuji GT 450km Race, where both cars caught fire and Max Racing ceased operations with immediate effect. In their three-year partnership, Max Racing scored a lone win at Suzuka in 2021 and scored a best points finish of fourth the same year.

== Former series results ==
=== JGTC ===
(key) (Races in bold indicate pole position) (Races in italics indicate fastest lap)

Year	Car	Tyres	Class	No.	Drivers	1	2	3	4	5	6	7	8	Pos	Pts
1997	Toyota MR2	Y	GT300	25	(Japan) Takeshi Tsuchiya (Japan) Masaoki Nagashima	SUZ; 3	FUJ; Ret	SEN; 1	FUJ; 5	MIN	**SUG**; 3			3rd	52
1998	Toyota MR2	Y	GT300	25	(Japan) Keiichi Suzuki (Japan) Shingo Tachi	SUZ; 1	FUJ; C	SEN; 1	**FUJ**; 1	MOT; 6	MIN; 1	**SUG**; 1		1st	106
1999	Toyota MR2	Y	GT300	25	(Japan) Morio Nitta (Japan) Yasushi Kikuchi (Japan) Shinichi Takagi	SUZ; 8	FUJ; 1	SUG; 2	MIN; 2	FUJ; 5	OKA; 8	MOT; Ret		1st	73
2000	Toyota Supra	Y	GT500	25	(Japan) Manabu Orido (Japan) Mitsuhiro Kinoshita	MOT; 13	FUJ; 10	SUG; 14	FUJ; 8	OKA; 8	MIN; 7	SUZ; 13		13th	11
2001	Toyota Supra	Y	GT500	25	(Japan) Manabu Orido (Japan) Seiji Ara	OKA; 9	FUJ; 11	SUG; 11	FUJ; DNS	MOT; 7	SUZ; 7	MIN; 10		12th	11
2002	Toyota Supra	Y	GT500	25	(Japan) Shinichi Yamaji (Japan) Seiji Ara (United Kingdom) Geoff Lees	OKA; 6	FUJ; 13	SUG; 11	SEP; Ret	FUJ; 4	MOT; 9	MIN; 5	SUZ; 7	10th	32
2003	Toyota Supra	Y	GT500	25	(France) Jérémie Dufour (Japan) Seiji Ara (Japan) Hideki Noda	OKA; 10	FUJ; Ret	SUG; 3	FUJ; 13	FUJ; 17	MOT; 3	AUT; 12	**SUZ**; Ret	10th	26
2004	Toyota Supra	Y	GT500	25	(Japan) Manabu Orido (Germany) Dominik Schwager	OKA; 14	SUG; 2	SEP; Ret	TOK; 13	MOT; 12	AUT; 3	SUZ; 10		10th	31

=== Super GT ===
(key) (Races in bold indicate pole position) (Races in italics indicate fastest lap)

Year	Car	Tyres	Class	No.	Drivers	1	2	3	4	5	6	7	8	9	Pos	Points
2005	Toyota Supra	Y	GT500	25	(Japan) Manabu Orido (Germany) Dominik Schwager (Japan) Hideki Noda	OKA; 1	FUJ; 14	SEP; 15	SUG; 9	MOT; 15	FUJ; NC	AUT; Ret	SUZ; 14		10th	26
2006	Toyota Supra	Y	GT500	25	(Japan) Takeshi Tsuchiya (Japan) Manabu Orido (Japan) Hideki Noda	SUZ; 8	OKA; 9	FUJ; 6	SEP; 10	SUG; 12	SUZ; Ret	MOT; 12	AUT; 15	FUJ; 9	14th	13
2007	Lexus SC430	Y	GT500	25	(Japan) Takeshi Tsuchiya (Japan) Manabu Orido	SUZ; 9	OKA; 6	FUJ; Ret	SEP; 5	SUG; 8	SUZ; Ret	MOT; 8	AUT; 10	FUJ; 12	14th	38
2008	Lexus SC430	Y	GT500	25	(Japan) Takeshi Tsuchiya (Japan) Hiroaki Ishiura	SUZ; 11	OKA; 11	FUJ; 8	SEP; 4	SUG; 4	SUZ; 14	MOT; 10	AUT; 12	FUJ; 8	14th	44
2010	Porsche 997 GT3-RSR	Y	GT300	25	(Japan) Takeshi Tsuchiya (Japan) Akihiro Tsuzuki (Japan) Yoshio Tsuzuki	SUZ	OKA	FUJ; 17	SEP	SUG; 16	SUZ; Ret	FUJ; C	MOT; 18		NC	0
2011	Porsche 997 GT3-RSR	Y	GT300	25	(Japan) Takeshi Tsuchiya (Japan) Akihiro Tsuzuki	OKA; 3	FUJ; Ret	SEP; Ret	SUG; 4	SUZ; 9	FUJ; 5	AUT; 5	MOT; 19		9th	49
2015	Toyota 86 MC GT300	Y	GT300	25	(Japan) Takeshi Tsuchiya (Japan) Takamitsu Matsui (Japan) Tatsuya Tanigawa	OKA; 6	FUJ; Ret	**CHA**; 7	FUJ; 5	SUZ; 23	SUG; 1	AUT; Ret	MOT; 12		9th	51
2016	Toyota 86 MC GT300	Y	GT300	25	(Japan) Takeshi Tsuchiya (Japan) Takamitsu Matsui (Japan) Kenta Yamashita	**OKA**; 6	FUJ; 3	**SUG**; 2	FUJ; 13	SUZ; 22	**CHA**; 1	MOT; 7	MOT; 1		1st	97
2017	Toyota 86 MC GT300	Y	GT300	25	(Japan) Takamitsu Matsui (Japan) Kenta Yamashita (Japan) Tsubasa Kondo	OKA; 4	FUJ; 15	**AUT**; 1	**SUG**; 3	FUJ; 29	**SUZ**; 18	**CHA**; 15	MOT; 5		6th	65
2018	Toyota 86 MC GT300	Y	GT300	25	(Japan) Takamitsu Matsui (Japan) Sho Tsuboi (Japan) Tsubasa Kondo (Japan) Takeshi Tsuchiya	OKA; 3	FUJ; Ret	SUZ; 2	CHA; 19	**FUJ**; 5	SUG; 24	**AUT**; 24	MOT; 8		8th	52
2019	Toyota 86 MC GT300	Y	GT300	25	(Japan) Takamitsu Matsui (Japan) Kimiya Sato	OKA; Ret	FUJ; 18	**SUZ**; 5	**BUR**; 4	FUJ; 26	**AUT**; 16	SUG; 27	MOT; 18		18th	29
2020	Porsche 911 GT3 R	Y	GT300	25	(Japan) Takamitsu Matsui (Japan) Kimiya Sato	FUJ; 19	FUJ; 20	SUZ; 14	MOT; 8	FUJ; 11	SUZ; 9	MOT; 6	FUJ; 14		15th	33
2020	Lexus RC F GT3	Y	GT300	244	(Japan) Atsushi Miyake (Japan) Rintaro Kubo	FUJ; 16	FUJ; 13	SUZ; 20	MOT; 26	FUJ; 19	SUZ; WD	MOT; 15	FUJ; 24		26th	19
2021	Porsche 911 GT3 R	Y	GT300	25	(Japan) Takamitsu Matsui (Japan) Kimiya Sato	OKA; 7	FUJ; 13	MOT; 6	SUZ; 23	SUG; 19	AUT; 10	MOT; 5	FUJ; 6		12th	45
2021	Toyota GR Supra GT300	Y	GT300	244	(Japan) Atsushi Miyake (Japan) Yuui Tsutsumi	OKA; 5	FUJ; 11	MOT; 4	SUZ; 1	SUG; 9	AUT; 17	MOT; 7	FUJ; 7		4th	68
2022	Toyota GR Supra GT300	Y	GT300	25	(Japan) Takamitsu Matsui (Japan) Seita Nonaka	OKA; 22	FUJ; 11	SUZ; Ret	FUJ	SUZ; 15	SUG; 10	AUT; 16	MOT; Ret		34th	1
2022	Toyota GR Supra GT300	Y	GT300	244	(Japan) Atsushi Miyake (Japan) Kimiya Sato	OKA	FUJ; 19	SUZ; 22	FUJ; Ret	SUZ; Ret	SUG; 14	AUT; 10	MOT; 17		35th	1
2023	Toyota GR Supra GT300	Y	GT300	25	(Japan) Seita Nonaka (Japan) Togo Suganami	OKA; 17	FUJ; 10	SUZ; 11	FUJ; Ret	SUZ	SUG	AUT	MOT		27th	10
2023	Toyota GR Supra GT300	Y	GT300	244	(Japan) Atsushi Miyake (Japan) Kimiya Sato	OKA; 3	FUJ; 16	SUZ; 16	FUJ; Ret	SUZ	SUG	AUT	MOT		20th	19
2024	Toyota GR Supra GT300	Y	GT300	25	(Japan) Takamitsu Matsui (Japan) Togo Suganami (Japan) Kimiya Sato	OKA; 14	FUJ; 23	SUZ; 18	FUJ; Ret	SUG; Ret	AUT; 11	MOT; Ret	SUZ; 15		22nd	12
2025	Toyota GR Supra GT300	Y	GT300	25	(Japan) Takamitsu Matsui (Japan) Kimiya Sato	OKA; 15	FUJ; 22	SEP	FS1; 25	FS2; 23	SUZ; 20	SUG; 20	AUT; 15	MOT; DNS	25th	15
2026	Toyota GR Supra GT300	Y	GT300	25	(Japan) Takamitsu Matsui (Japan) Ryota Horachi	OKA	FUJ	SEP	FUJ	SUZ	SUG	AUT	MOT		TBD	TBD

^{‡} Half points awarded as less than 75% of race distance was completed. * Season still in progress.

== Timeline ==
Current series
Super GT	1997–2008, 2010–2011, 2015–present
Former series
Japanese Touring Car Championship	1985–1998
Super Taikyu Series	2012
Japan Formula 4	2014
Japanese Formula 3 Championship	2016
