= 1998 All Japan Grand Touring Car Championship =

Motorsport championship

The 1998 All Japan Grand Touring Car Championship was the sixth season of Japan Automobile Federation GT premiere racing. It was marked as well as the sixteenth season of a JAF-sanctioned sports car racing championship dating back to the All Japan Sports Prototype Championship. The GT500 class champion was the #23 Pennzoil NISMO Nissan Skyline GT-R driven by Érik Comas and Masami Kageyama, and the GT300 class champion was the #25 Team Taisan Jr with Tsuchiya MR2 driven by Keiichi Suzuki and Shingo Tachi, who won a record five championship races, plus the post-season all-star race, giving them a total of six wins in 1998.

The season was marred by a horrific crash at the All Japan Fuji GT Race on May 3, 1998, when Ferrari Club of Japan driver Tetsuya Ota lost control of his Ferrari F355 in heavy rain and fog, and crashed into the stationary Porsche 911 of Tomohiko Sunako. Ota's car erupted into flames upon impact, and fellow racer Shinichi Yamaji rushed to extinguish the fire. Ota suffered severe burns and nerve damage that would force him to retire from full-time racing. Sunako suffered a broken leg, but would continue to race in the series later on.

1998 also saw the first GT500 class victory for Honda, at the Japan Special GT Cup at Fuji Speedway.

== Drivers and teams ==
=== GT500 ===
Team	Make	Car	Engine	No.	Drivers	Tyre	Rounds
Nismo	Nissan	Nissan Skyline GT-R	Nissan RB26DETT 2.7 L Twin Turbo I6	2	(Japan) Masahiko Kageyama	B	All
Nismo	Nissan	Nissan Skyline GT-R	Nissan RB26DETT 2.7 L Twin Turbo I6	2	(Japan) Aguri Suzuki	B	1, 3–7, NC
Nismo	Nissan	Nissan Skyline GT-R	Nissan RB26DETT 2.7 L Twin Turbo I6	2	(Spain) Pedro de la Rosa	B	2
Nismo	Nissan	Nissan Skyline GT-R	Nissan RB26DETT 2.7 L Twin Turbo I6	23	(Japan) Masami Kageyama	B	All
Nismo	Nissan	Nissan Skyline GT-R	Nissan RB26DETT 2.7 L Twin Turbo I6	23	(France) Érik Comas	B	1, 3–7, NC
Nismo	Nissan	Nissan Skyline GT-R	Nissan RB26DETT 2.7 L Twin Turbo I6	23	(Republic of Ireland) Ralph Firman	B	2
Hasemi Motorsport	Nissan	Nissan Skyline GT-R	Nissan RB26DETT 2.7 L Twin Turbo I6	3	(Japan) Masahiro Hasemi	B	All
Hasemi Motorsport	Nissan	Nissan Skyline GT-R	Nissan RB26DETT 2.7 L Twin Turbo I6	3	(Japan) Tetsuya Tanaka	B	All
Team 5ZIGEN	Toyota	Toyota Supra	Toyota 3S-GT 2.0 L Turbo I4	5	(Belgium) Marc Goossens	D	All
Team 5ZIGEN	Toyota	Toyota Supra	Toyota 3S-GT 2.0 L Turbo I4	5	(Japan) Yasutaka Hinoi	D	1–3
Team 5ZIGEN	Toyota	Toyota Supra	Toyota 3S-GT 2.0 L Turbo I4	5	(Japan) Eiichi Tajima	D	4–7
INGING	Toyota	Toyota Supra	Toyota 3S-GT 2.0 L Turbo I4	6	(Japan) Shinichi Takagi	B	All
INGING	Toyota	Toyota Supra	Toyota 3S-GT 2.0 L Turbo I4	6	(France) Pierre-Henri Raphanel	B	1, 3–7
INGING	Toyota	Toyota Supra	Toyota 3S-GT 2.0 L Turbo I4	6	(Sweden) Anders Olofsson	B	2
Team Power Craft	Toyota	Toyota Supra	Toyota 3S-GT 2.0 L Turbo I4	8	(Australia) Wayne Gardner	B	1–4, 6–7
Team Power Craft	Toyota	Toyota Supra	Toyota 3S-GT 2.0 L Turbo I4	8	(Japan) Minoru Tanaka	B	1–4, 6–7
Calsonic Team Impul	Nissan	Nissan Skyline GT-R	Nissan RB26DETT 2.7 L Twin Turbo I6	12	(Japan) Takuya Kurosawa	B	All
Calsonic Team Impul	Nissan	Nissan Skyline GT-R	Nissan RB26DETT 2.7 L Twin Turbo I6	12	(Japan) Kazuyoshi Hoshino	B	1, 3–7, NC
Calsonic Team Impul	Nissan	Nissan Skyline GT-R	Nissan RB26DETT 2.7 L Twin Turbo I6	12	(Germany) Michael Krumm	B	2
Endless Sports	Nissan	Nissan Skyline GT-R	Nissan RB26DETT 2.7 L Twin Turbo I6	13	(Japan) Mitsuhiro Kinoshita	Y	All
Endless Sports	Nissan	Nissan Skyline GT-R	Nissan RB26DETT 2.7 L Twin Turbo I6	13	(Japan) Mitsuo Fujimura	Y	All
Castrol Mugen	Honda	Honda NSX	Honda C32B 3.5 L V6	16	(Japan) Ryō Michigami	B	All
Castrol Mugen	Honda	Honda NSX	Honda C32B 3.5 L V6	16	(Japan) Osamu Nakako	B	All
Dome Racing Team	Honda	Honda NSX	Honda C32B 3.5 L V6	18	(Japan) Katsutomo Kaneishi	B	All
Dome Racing Team	Honda	Honda NSX	Honda C32B 3.5 L V6	18	(Japan) Katsumi Yamamoto	B	1–5
Dome Racing Team	Honda	Honda NSX	Honda C32B 3.5 L V6	18	(Japan) Juichi Wakisaka	B	6–7, NC
Team Take One	Porsche	Porsche 993 GT2	Porsche M64/81 3.6 L Twin Turbo F6	30	(Japan) Hideki Okada	B	All
Team Take One	Porsche	Porsche 993 GT2	Porsche M64/81 3.6 L Twin Turbo F6	30	(Japan) Yoji Yamada	B	All
Toyota Team TOM'S	Toyota	Toyota Supra	Toyota 3S-GT 2.0 L Turbo I4	36	(Japan) Masanori Sekiya	D	All
Toyota Team TOM'S	Toyota	Toyota Supra	Toyota 3S-GT 2.0 L Turbo I4	36	(Argentina) Norberto Fontana	D	All
Toyota Team TOM'S	Toyota	Toyota Supra	Toyota 3S-GT 2.0 L Turbo I4	37	(Japan) Toshio Suzuki	D	All
Toyota Team TOM'S	Toyota	Toyota Supra	Toyota 3S-GT 2.0 L Turbo I4	37	(United Kingdom) Kelvin Burt	D	All
Toyota Team Cerumo	Toyota	Toyota Supra	Toyota 3S-GT 2.0 L Turbo I4	38	(Japan) Hironori Takeuchi	B	All
Toyota Team Cerumo	Toyota	Toyota Supra	Toyota 3S-GT 2.0 L Turbo I4	38	(Japan) Hideki Noda	B	All
Denso Toyota Team SARD	Toyota	Toyota Supra	Toyota 3S-GT 2.0 L Turbo I4	39	(Japan) Keiichi Tsuchiya	Y	All
Denso Toyota Team SARD	Toyota	Toyota Supra	Toyota 3S-GT 2.0 L Turbo I4	39	(Japan) Tatsuya Tanigawa	Y	All
Autobacs Racing Team Aguri	Nissan	Nissan Skyline GT-R	Nissan RB26DETT 2.7 L Twin Turbo I6	50	(Japan) Takeshi Tsuchiya	B	All
Autobacs Racing Team Aguri	Nissan	Nissan Skyline GT-R	Nissan RB26DETT 2.7 L Twin Turbo I6	50	(Japan) Satoshi Motoyama	B	1, 3–7, NC
Autobacs Racing Team Aguri	Nissan	Nissan Skyline GT-R	Nissan RB26DETT 2.7 L Twin Turbo I6	50	(Japan) Hiroki Katoh	B	2
Team Taisan Advan	Chrysler	Chrysler Viper GTS-R	Chrysler EWB 8.0 L V10	55	(Japan) Hideshi Matsuda	Y	1–2, 4, 7, NC
Team Taisan Advan	Chrysler	Chrysler Viper GTS-R	Chrysler EWB 8.0 L V10	55	(Japan) Eiichi Tajima	Y	1–2
Team Taisan Advan	Chrysler	Chrysler Viper GTS-R	Chrysler EWB 8.0 L V10	55	(Japan) Fuminori Mizuno	Y	4
Team Taisan Advan	Chrysler	Chrysler Viper GTS-R	Chrysler EWB 8.0 L V10	55	(United Kingdom) Anthony Reid	Y	7
Team Taisan Advan	Chrysler	Chrysler Viper GTS-R	Chrysler EWB 8.0 L V10	55	(Japan) Mitsuhiro Kinoshita	Y	NC
Mobil 1 Nakajima Racing	Honda	Honda NSX	Honda C32B 3.5 L V6	64	(Netherlands) Tom Coronel	B	All
Mobil 1 Nakajima Racing	Honda	Honda NSX	Honda C32B 3.5 L V6	64	(Japan) Koji Yamanishi	B	1–2, 4–7, NC
Mobil 1 Nakajima Racing	Honda	Honda NSX	Honda C32B 3.5 L V6	64	(Japan) Koji Sato	B	3
JLOC Corsa	Lamborghini	Lamborghini Diablo GT-1	Lamborghini L532 6.0 L V12	88	(Japan) Naohiro Furuya	D	All
JLOC Corsa	Lamborghini	Lamborghini Diablo GT-1	Lamborghini L532 6.0 L V12	88	(Japan) Hisashi Wada	D	All
JLOC Corsa	Lamborghini	Lamborghini Diablo Jota	Lamborghini L532 6.0 L V12	777	(Japan) Takao Wada	D	2, 4–5, 7
JLOC Corsa	Lamborghini	Lamborghini Diablo Jota	Lamborghini L532 6.0 L V12	777	(Japan) Masami Sugiyama	D	2, 4–5, 7
Kenji Kawagoe	Porsche	Porsche 993 GT2	Porsche M64/81 3.6 L Twin Turbo F6	89	(Japan) Kenji Kawagoe	D	2
Kenji Kawagoe	Porsche	Porsche 993 GT2	Porsche M64/81 3.6 L Twin Turbo F6	89	(Japan) Toshikazu Kanamori	D	2
Raybrig Team Kunimitsu with Mooncraft	Honda	Honda NSX	Honda C32B 3.5 L V6	100	(Japan) Kunimitsu Takahashi	B	All
Raybrig Team Kunimitsu with Mooncraft	Honda	Honda NSX	Honda C32B 3.5 L V6	100	(Japan) Akira Iida	B	All

=== GT300 ===
Team	Make	Car	Engine	No.	Drivers	Tyre	Rounds
RE Amemiya Racing	Mazda	Mazda RX-7	Mazda RE20B 2.0 L 3-rotor	7	(Japan) Shinichi Yamaji	D	All
RE Amemiya Racing	Mazda	Mazda RX-7	Mazda RE20B 2.0 L 3-rotor	7	(Japan) Haruhiko Matsumoto	D	All
Team Daikokuya	Porsche	Porsche 993 RSR	Porsche M64/80 3.8 L F6	9	(Japan) Shuroku Sasaki	D	1–2
Team Daikokuya	Porsche	Porsche 993 RSR	Porsche M64/80 3.8 L F6	9	(Japan) Tsunefumi Hioki	D	1, 3
Team Daikokuya	Porsche	Porsche 993 RSR	Porsche M64/80 3.8 L F6	9	(Japan) Yukihiro Hane	D	3–5, 7
Team Daikokuya	Porsche	Porsche 993 RSR	Porsche M64/80 3.8 L F6	9	(Japan) Naohiro Kawano	D	4–5, 7
Team Daikokuya	Porsche	Porsche 993 RSR	Porsche M64/80 3.8 L F6	9	(Japan) Hideaki Ichimura	D	2
Team Daikokuya	Porsche	Porsche 993 RSR	Porsche M64/80 3.8 L F6	99	(Japan) Tsunefumi Hioki	D	5–6
Team Daikokuya	Porsche	Porsche 993 RSR	Porsche M64/80 3.8 L F6	99	(Japan) Kiichi Takahashi	D	5
Team Daikokuya	Porsche	Porsche 993 RSR	Porsche M64/80 3.8 L F6	99	(Japan) Akira Yoshitomi	D	6
Ability Motorsport	Porsche	Porsche 993 GT2	Porsche M64/82 3.6 L Turbo F6	10	(Japan) Hidehiko Aso	D	All
Ability Motorsport	Porsche	Porsche 993 GT2	Porsche M64/82 3.6 L Turbo F6	10	(Japan) Akira Ishikawa	D	All
M Factory Racing Club	Nissan	Nissan Skyline GTS-R (HR31)	Nissan SR20DET 2.0 L Turbo I4	11	(Japan) Hiromoto Ishimori	B	2, 4
M Factory Racing Club	Nissan	Nissan Skyline GTS-R (HR31)	Nissan SR20DET 2.0 L Turbo I4	11	(Japan) Kazuo Miura	B	2, 4
Xanavi Racing with Nismo Jr.	Nissan	Nissan Silvia (S14)	Nissan SR20DET 2.0 L Turbo I4	15	(Japan) Masahiko Kondo	B	All
Xanavi Racing with Nismo Jr.	Nissan	Nissan Silvia (S14)	Nissan SR20DET 2.0 L Turbo I4	15	(Japan) Takayuki Aoki	B	All
Kageisen Racing Team	Mazda	Mazda Roadster (NA)	Mazda RE13B 1.3 L 2-rotor	17	(Japan) Toshihiko Nogami	D	1–2, 4–5, 7
Kageisen Racing Team	Mazda	Mazda Roadster (NA)	Mazda RE13B 1.3 L 2-rotor	17	(Japan) Tomoyuki Hosono	D	1, 4
Kageisen Racing Team	Mazda	Mazda Roadster (NA)	Mazda RE13B 1.3 L 2-rotor	17	(Japan) Masaaki Nagashima	D	2, 5, 7
Racing Project Bandoh	Toyota	Toyota Celica	Toyota 3S-GE 2.0 L I4	19	(Japan) Manabu Orido	Y	4–7
Racing Project Bandoh	Toyota	Toyota Celica	Toyota 3S-GE 2.0 L I4	19	(Italy) Max Angelelli	Y	4–6
Racing Project Bandoh	Toyota	Toyota Celica	Toyota 3S-GE 2.0 L I4	19	(Japan) Katsumi Yamamoto	Y	7
Hitotsuyama Racing	BMW	BMW M3 (E36)	BMW S14 2.2 L Turbo I4	21	(Japan) Hiroki Katoh	D	1, 3–7
Hitotsuyama Racing	BMW	BMW M3 (E36)	BMW S14 2.2 L Turbo I4	21	(Japan) Yasushi Hitotsuyama	D	1–2, 4, 7
Hitotsuyama Racing	BMW	BMW M3 (E36)	BMW S14 2.2 L Turbo I4	21	(Japan) Mikio Hitotsuyama	D	3, 5–6
Hitotsuyama Racing	BMW	BMW M3 (E36)	BMW S14 2.2 L Turbo I4	21	(Japan) Takayuki Kinoshita	D	2
Hirano Motorsport	Nissan	Nissan Skyline GTS-i (R32)	Nissan RB20DET 2.0 L Turbo I6	24	(Japan) Toshiyuki Hirano	Y	2, 4
Hirano Motorsport	Nissan	Nissan Skyline GTS-i (R32)	Nissan RB20DET 2.0 L Turbo I6	24	(Japan) Teruhiko Someba	Y	2, 4
Team Taisan Jr. with Tsuchiya	Toyota	Toyota MR2	Toyota 3S-GTE 2.0 L Turbo I4	25	(Japan) Keiichi Suzuki	Y	All
Team Taisan Jr. with Tsuchiya	Toyota	Toyota MR2	Toyota 3S-GTE 2.0 L Turbo I4	25	(Japan) Shingo Tachi	Y	All
Team Ferrari Club of Japan	Ferrari	Ferrari F355 GT	Ferrari F129B 3.5 L V8	27	(Japan) Tetsuya Ota	Y	1–2
Team Ferrari Club of Japan	Ferrari	Ferrari F355 GT	Ferrari F129B 3.5 L V8	27	(Sweden) Anders Olofsson	Y	1
Team Ferrari Club of Japan	Ferrari	Ferrari F355 GT	Ferrari F129B 3.5 L V8	27	(Sweden) Steven Andskär	Y	2
Team Ferrari Club of Japan	Ferrari	Ferrari F355 GT	Ferrari F129B 3.5 L V8	28	(Japan) Masahiro Yamazaki	Y	2–3
Team Ferrari Club of Japan	Ferrari	Ferrari F355 GT	Ferrari F129B 3.5 L V8	28	(Japan) Hiroaki Suga	Y	5
A'PEX	Toyota	Toyota MR2	Toyota 3S-GTE 2.0 L Turbo I4	44	(Japan) Morio Nitta	D	All
A'PEX	Toyota	Toyota MR2	Toyota 3S-GTE 2.0 L Turbo I4	44	(Japan) Shota Mizuno	D	1–3
A'PEX	Toyota	Toyota MR2	Toyota 3S-GTE 2.0 L Turbo I4	44	(United Kingdom) Peter Dumbreck	D	4–7
Cobra Racing Team	Porsche	Porsche 993 RSR	Porsche M64/80 3.8 L F6	51	(Japan) Katsunori Iketani	Y	All
Cobra Racing Team	Porsche	Porsche 993 RSR	Porsche M64/80 3.8 L F6	51	(Japan) Seiichi Sodeyama	Y	1
Cobra Racing Team	Porsche	Porsche 993 RSR	Porsche M64/80 3.8 L F6	51	(Japan) Masamitsu Ishihara	Y	2–5, 7
Cobra Racing Team	Porsche	Porsche 993 RSR	Porsche M64/80 3.8 L F6	51	(Japan) "OSAMU"	Y	6
KRAFT	Toyota	Toyota Cavalier	Toyota 3S-GE 2.0 L I4	60	(Japan) Kumi Sato	D	All
KRAFT	Toyota	Toyota Cavalier	Toyota 3S-GE 2.0 L I4	60	(Japan) Masaoki Nagashima	D	1
KRAFT	Toyota	Toyota Cavalier	Toyota 3S-GE 2.0 L I4	60	(Japan) Junko Mihara	D	2
KRAFT	Toyota	Toyota Cavalier	Toyota 3S-GE 2.0 L I4	60	(Japan) Akira Watanabe	D	3–7
Team Taeivon Ralliart	Mitsubishi	Mitsubishi FTO	Mitsubishi 4G63 2.0 L Turbo I4	61	(Japan) Akihiko Nakaya	T	All
Team Taeivon Ralliart	Mitsubishi	Mitsubishi FTO	Mitsubishi 4G63 2.0 L Turbo I4	61	(Japan) Takahiko Hara	T	All
Team Gaikokuya	Porsche	Porsche 993 GT2	Porsche M64/81 3.6 L Turbo F6	70	(Japan) Yoshimi Ishibashi	Y	All
Team Gaikokuya	Porsche	Porsche 993 GT2	Porsche M64/81 3.6 L Turbo F6	70	(Belgium) Patrick van Schoote	Y	All
SigmaTec Racing Team	Porsche	Porsche 993 GT2	Porsche M64/81 3.6 L Turbo F6	71	(Japan) Kaoru Hoshino	D	All
SigmaTec Racing Team	Porsche	Porsche 993 GT2	Porsche M64/81 3.6 L Turbo F6	71	(Japan) Masaki Jyonai	D	All
Okura Rotary Racing	Mazda	Mazda RX-7	Mazda RE20B 2.0 L 3-rotor	72	(New Zealand) Mark Porter	Y	3–7
Okura Rotary Racing	Mazda	Mazda RX-7	Mazda RE20B 2.0 L 3-rotor	72	(Japan) Yoshimi Katayama	Y	3–4
Okura Rotary Racing	Mazda	Mazda RX-7	Mazda RE20B 2.0 L 3-rotor	72	(Japan) Isao Hirano	Y	5–7
Cusco Racing	Subaru	Subaru Impreza WRX STI	Subaru EJ20 2.0 L Turbo F4	77	(Japan) Katsuo Kobayashi	Y	All
Cusco Racing	Subaru	Subaru Impreza WRX STI	Subaru EJ20 2.0 L Turbo F4	77	(Japan) Hideyuki Tamamoto	Y	All
NAC West	Nissan	Nissan Silvia (S13)	Nissan FJ20DET 2.0 L Turbo I4	79	(Japan) Masanori Sugiyama	Y	2, 4
NAC West	Nissan	Nissan Silvia (S13)	Nissan FJ20DET 2.0 L Turbo I4	79	(Japan) Hiroyasu Aoyagi	Y	2, 4
Team Daishin	Nissan	Nissan Silvia (S14)	Nissan SR20DET 2.0 L Turbo I4	81	(Japan) Hideo Fukuyama	D	All
Team Daishin	Nissan	Nissan Silvia (S14)	Nissan SR20DET 2.0 L Turbo I4	81	(Japan) Nobuyuki Oyagi	D	All
First Racing Team	Toyota	Toyota MR2	Toyota 3S-GTE 2.0 L Turbo I4	91	(Japan) Masahiro Matsunaga	Y	1–3
First Racing Team	Toyota	Toyota MR2	Toyota 3S-GTE 2.0 L Turbo I4	91	(Japan) Yasuhisa Fujiwara	Y	1–3
First Racing Team	Toyota	Toyota Celica	Toyota 3S-GTE 2.0 L Turbo I4	91	(Japan) Masahiro Matsunaga	Y	4–7
First Racing Team	Toyota	Toyota Celica	Toyota 3S-GTE 2.0 L Turbo I4	91	(Japan) Yasuhisa Fujiwara	Y	4–7
Alta Racing Team	Mazda	Mazda RX-7	Mazda RE20B 2.0 L 3-rotor	117	(Japan) Toshihiro Fukazawa	Y	2, 4–5, 7
Alta Racing Team	Mazda	Mazda RX-7	Mazda RE20B 2.0 L 3-rotor	117	(Japan) Tetsuo Kozai	Y	2, 4–5, 7
NSX Dream28 Competition	Honda	Honda NSX	Honda C32B 3.5 L V6	280	(Japan) Hajime Oshiro	Y	4
NSX Dream28 Competition	Honda	Honda NSX	Honda C32B 3.5 L V6	280	(Japan) Mamoru Suzuki	Y	4
Yellow Magic	Ferrari	Ferrari F355	Ferrari F129B 3.6 L V8	355	(Japan) Hiroaki Suga	Y	4–5, 7
Yellow Magic	Ferrari	Ferrari F355	Ferrari F129B 3.6 L V8	355	(Japan) Takayuki Ohi	Y	4
Yellow Magic	Ferrari	Ferrari F355	Ferrari F129B 3.6 L V8	355	(Japan) Tatsuyuki Fujiwara	Y	5
Yellow Magic	Ferrari	Ferrari F355	Ferrari F129B 3.6 L V8	355	(Japan) Seiichi Sodeyama	Y	7
910 Racing	Porsche	Porsche 993 RSR	Porsche M64/80 3.8 L F6	910	(Japan) Atsushi Yogo	D	All
910 Racing	Porsche	Porsche 993 RSR	Porsche M64/80 3.8 L F6	910	(Japan) Tomohiko Sunako	D	1–2
910 Racing	Porsche	Porsche 993 RSR	Porsche M64/80 3.8 L F6	910	(Japan) Shogo Kobayashi	D	3–4
910 Racing	Porsche	Porsche 993 RSR	Porsche M64/80 3.8 L F6	910	(Japan) Takayuki Kinoshita	D	5–7
910 Racing	Porsche	Porsche 993 RSR	Porsche M64/80 3.8 L F6	911	(Japan) Kiichi Takahashi	D	1–4, 7
910 Racing	Porsche	Porsche 993 RSR	Porsche M64/80 3.8 L F6	911	(Japan) Shogo Kobayashi	D	1
910 Racing	Porsche	Porsche 993 RSR	Porsche M64/80 3.8 L F6	911	(Japan) Kazushige Saito	D	2–3, 7
910 Racing	Porsche	Porsche 993 RSR	Porsche M64/80 3.8 L F6	911	(Japan) Hirotaka Nakajima	D	4

== Schedule ==
Round	Race	Circuit	Date
1	Suzuka GT 300	(Japan) Suzuka Circuit	March 22
2	All Japan Fuji GT Race	(Japan) Fuji Speedway	May 3
3	HiLand GT Championship	(Japan) Sendai Hi-Land Raceway	June 28
4	Japan Special GT-Cup	(Japan) Fuji Speedway	August 9
5	Motegi GT Championship Race	(Japan) Twin Ring Motegi	September 13
6	CP Mine GT Race	(Japan) Mine Circuit	October 11
7	SUGO GT Championship	(Japan) Sportsland SUGO	October 25
NC	Nicos Cup GT Allstar Race	(Japan) TI Circuit	November 15

== Season results ==
Round	Circuit	GT500 Winning Team	GT300 Winning Team
Round	Circuit	GT500 Winning Drivers	GT300 Winning Drivers
1	Suzuka Circuit	#23 Pennzoil NISMO GT-R	#25 Team Taisan Jr with Tsuchiya MR-2
1	Suzuka Circuit	(Japan) Masami Kageyama (France) Érik Comas	(Japan) Keiichi Suzuki (Japan) Shingo Tachi
-	Mt. Fuji	Race abandoned because of crash at start and subsequent fog.	
2	Sendai	#23 Pennzoil NISMO GT-R	#25 Team Taisan Jr with Tsuchiya MR-2
2	Sendai	(Japan) Masami Kageyama (France) Érik Comas	(Japan) Keiichi Suzuki (Japan) Shingo Tachi
3	Mt. Fuji	#64 Mobil 1 Nakajima Racing Honda NSX	#25 Team Taisan Jr with Tsuchiya MR-2
3	Mt. Fuji	(Netherlands) Tom Coronel (Japan) Koji Yamanishi	(Japan) Keiichi Suzuki (Japan) Shingo Tachi
4	Twin Ring Motegi	#16 Castrol Mugen Honda NSX	#77 Cusco Subaru Impreza
4	Twin Ring Motegi	(Japan) Ryō Michigami (Japan) Osamu Nakako	(Japan) Katsuo Kobayashi (Japan) Hideyuki Tamamoto
5	Mine Circuit	#100 Team Kunimitsu Honda NSX	#25 Team Taisan Jr with Tsuchiya MR-2
5	Mine Circuit	(Japan) Kunimitsu Takahashi (Japan) Akira Iida	(Japan) Keiichi Suzuki (Japan) Shingo Tachi
6	Sportsland SUGO	#16 Castrol Mugen Honda NSX	#25 Team Taisan Jr with Tsuchiya MR-2
6	Sportsland SUGO	(Japan) Ryō Michigami (Japan) Osamu Nakako	(Japan) Keiichi Suzuki (Japan) Shingo Tachi
NC	TI Circuit	#64 Mobil 1 Nakajima Racing Honda NSX	#25 Team Taisan Jr with Tsuchiya MR-2
NC	TI Circuit	(Netherlands) Tom Coronel (Japan) Koji Yamanishi	(Japan) Keiichi Suzuki (Japan) Shingo Tachi

== Point Ranking ==
=== GT500 ===
==== Drivers ====
Rank	No.	Driver	SUZ (Japan)	FUJ (Japan)	SEN (Japan)	FUJ (Japan)	MOT (Japan)	MIN (Japan)	SUG (Japan)	TAI (Japan)	Pts.
1	23	(Japan) Masami Kageyama	1	C	1	10	4	4	6	10	67
1	23	(France) Érik Comas	1		1	10	4	4	6	10	67
2	64	(Japan) Koji Yamanishi	2	C		1	Ret	2	DNS	1	50
2	64	(Netherlands) Tom Coronel	2	C	Ret	1	Ret	2	DNS	1	50
3	12	(Japan) Kazuyoshi Hoshino	11		5	3	2	7	4	5	49
3	12	(Japan) Takuya Kurosawa	11	C	5	3	2	7	4	5	49
4	16	(Japan) Osamu Nakako (Japan) Ryō Michigami	Ret	C	Ret	5	1	11	1	7	48
5	3	(Japan) Masahiro Hasemi (Japan) Tetsuya Tanaka	5	C	Ret	2	8	8	5	4	37
6	39	(Japan) Keiichi Tsuchiya (Japan) Tatsuya Tanigawa	3	C	4	9	Ret	3	Ret	3	36
7	36	(Japan) Masanori Sekiya (Argentina) Norberto Fontana	6	C	3	8	3	16	Ret	Ret	33
8	2	(Japan) Aguri Suzuki	Ret		2	7	11	5	9	Ret	29
8	2	(Japan) Masahiko Kageyama	Ret	C	2	7	11	5	9	Ret	29
9	37	(Japan) Toshio Suzuki (United Kingdom) Kelvin Burt	7	C	6	11	Ret	10	2	6	26
10	100	(Japan) Kunimitsu Takahashi (Japan) Akira Iida	10	C	12	Ret	7	1	Ret	2	25
11	38	(Japan) Hironori Takeuchi (Japan) Hideki Noda	9	C	Ret	Ret	5	12	3	Ret	22
12	50	(Japan) Satoshi Motoyama	13		11	6	6	9	8	Ret	17
12	50	(Japan) Takeshi Tsuchiya	13	C	11	6	6	9	8	Ret	17
13	5	(Belgium) Marc Goossens	4	C	7	Ret	Ret	Ret	Ret		14
14	5	(Japan) Yasutaka Hinoi	4	C	7						14
15	18	(Japan) Katsutomo Kaneishi	Ret	C	Ret	4	Ret	15	DSQ	Ret	10
16	18	(Japan) Katsumi Yamamoto	Ret	C	Ret	4	Ret				10
17	8	(Australia) Wayne Gardner (Japan) Minoru Tanaka	8	C	10	12		Ret	7		8
18	6	(France) Pierre-Henri Raphanel	Ret		Ret	13	Ret	6	DNQ		6
18	6	(Japan) Shinichi Takagi	Ret	C	Ret	13	Ret	6	DNQ		6
19	30	(Japan) Yoji Yamada (Japan) Hideki Okada	12	C	8	15	9	14	Ret	9	5
20	88	(Japan) Hisashi Wada (Japan) Naohiro Furuya	Ret	C	9	18	10	13	11		3
21	55	(Japan) Hideshi Matsuda	14	C		14			10	8	1
22	55	(United Kingdom) Anthony Reid							10		1
-	55	(Japan) Eiichi Tajima	14	C							0
-	5	(Japan) Eiichi Tajima				Ret	Ret	Ret	Ret		0
-	55	(Japan) Fuminori Mizuno				14					0
-	13	(Japan) Mitsuhiro Kinoshita		C	Ret	16	12	17	Ret		0
-	55	(Japan) Mitsuhiro Kinoshita								8	0
-	13	(Japan) Mitsuo Fujimura		C	Ret	16	12	17	Ret		0
-	777	(Japan) Takao Wada (Japan) Masayoshi Sugiyama	15	C		17	Ret		Ret		0
-	18	(Japan) Juichi Wakisaka						15	DSQ	Ret	0
-	64	(Japan) Koji Sato			Ret						0
-	2	(Spain) Pedro de la Rosa		C							0
-	23	(Republic of Ireland) Ralph Firman		C							0
-	50	(Japan) Hiroki Katoh		C							0
-	12	(Germany) Michael Krumm		C							0
-	6	(Sweden) Anders Olofsson		C							0
-	89	(Japan) Kenji Kawagoe (Japan) Tonichi Kanamori		C							0
Rank	No.	Driver	SUZ (Japan)	FUJ (Japan)	SEN (Japan)	FUJ (Japan)	MOT (Japan)	MIN (Japan)	SUG (Japan)	TAI (Japan)	Pts.

==== GT500 Teams' standings ====
For teams that entered multiple cars, only the best result from each round counted towards the teams' points.

Rank	Team	No.	SUZ (Japan)	FUJ (Japan)	SEN (Japan)	FUJ (Japan)	MOT (Japan)	MIN (Japan)	SUG (Japan)	TAI (Japan)	Pts.
1	Nismo	2	Ret	C	2	7	11	5	9	Ret	70
1	Nismo	23	1	C	1	10	4	4	6	10	70
2	Mobil 1 Nakajima Racing	64	2	C	Ret	1	Ret	2	DNS	1	50
3	Toyota Castrol Team TOM'S	36	6	C	3	8	3	16	Ret	Ret	49
3	Toyota Castrol Team TOM'S	37	7	C	6	11	Ret	10	2	6	49
4	Calsonic Team Impul	12	11	C	5	3	2	7	4	5	49
5	Castrol Mugen	16	Ret	C	Ret	5	1	11	1	7	48
6	Hasemi Motorsports	3	5	C	Ret	2	8	8	5	4	37
7	Toyota Team SARD	39	3	C	4	9	Ret	3	Ret	3	36
8	Team Kunimitsu with Mooncraft	100	10	C	12	Ret	7	1	Ret	2	25
9	Toyota Team Cerumo	38	9	C	Ret	Ret	5	12	3	Ret	22
9	Autobacs Racing Team Aguri	50	13	C	11	6	6	9	8	Ret	17
11	Team 5Zigen	5	4	C	7	Ret	Ret	Ret	Ret		14
12	Dome Racing Team	18	Ret	C	Ret	4	Ret	15	DSQ	Ret	10
13	Team Power Craft	8	8	C	10	12		Ret	7		8
14	INGING	6	Ret	C	Ret	13	Ret	6	DNQ		6
15	Team Take One	30	12	C	8	15	9	14	Ret	9	5
16	JLOC	88	Ret	C	9	18	10	13	11		3
16	JLOC	777	15	C		17	Ret	DNA	Ret		3
17	Team Taisan Advan	34	14	C		14		DNA	10	8	1
-	Endless Sports	13	DNA	C	Ret	16	12	17	Ret		0
-	Kenji Kawagoe	89		C							0
Rank	Team	No.	SUZ (Japan)	FUJ (Japan)	SEN (Japan)	FUJ (Japan)	MOT (Japan)	MIN (Japan)	SUG (Japan)	TAI (Japan)	Pts.

=== GT300 Drivers' championship ===
Rank	No.	Driver	SUZ (Japan)	FUJ (Japan)	SEN (Japan)	FUJ (Japan)	MOT (Japan)	MIN (Japan)	SUG (Japan)	TAI (Japan)	Pts.
1	25	(Japan) Keiichi Suzuki (Japan) Shingo Tachi	1	C	1	1	6	1	1	1	106
2	19	(Japan) Manabu Orido				7	2	2	3		46
3	44	(Japan) Morio Nitta	7	C	6	2	4	4	Ret		45
4	21	(Japan) Hiroki Katoh	Ret		5	3	5	5	5		44
5	61	(Japan) Akihiko Nakaya (Japan) Takahiko Hara	3	C	7	Ret	Ret	6	2	Ret	37
6	15	(Japan) Masahiko Kondo (Japan) Takayuki Aoki	4	C	2	NC	14	Ret	4	3	35
6	44	(United Kingdom) Peter Dumbreck				2	4	4	Ret		35
8	19	(Italy) Max Angelelli				7	2	2			34
9	910	(Japan) Atsushi Yogo	5	C	4	8	3	Ret	14		33
10	7	(Japan) Shinichi Yamaji (Japan) Haruhiko Matsumoto	Ret	C	3	5	Ret	9	6	2	28
11	81	(Japan) Hideo Fukuyama (Japan) Nobuyuki Oyagi	Ret	C	Ret	6	8	3	8	4	24
12	21	(Japan) Mikio Hitotsuyama			5		5	5			24
13	77	(Japan) Katsuo Kobayashi (Japan) Hideyuki Tamamoto	8	C	Ret	17	1	Ret	12	Ret	23
14	21	(Japan) Yasushi Hitotsuyama	Ret	C		3			5		20
15	51	(Japan) Katsunori Iketani	2	C	Ret	10	9	10	Ret		19
16	51/355	(Japan) Seiichi Sodeyama	2						Ret		15
17	911/910	(Japan) Shogo Kobayashi	9	C	4	8	DNA	DNA			15
18	91	(Japan) Masahiro Matsunaga (Japan) Yasuhisa Fujiwara	6	DNS	8	9	7	Ret	13		15
19	21/910	(Japan) Takayuki Kinoshita		C			3	Ret	14		12
19	19	(Japan) Katsumi Yamamoto							3		12
21	71	(Japan) Kaoru Hoshino (Japan) Masaki Jyonai	Ret	C	9	4	DNA	DNA	16		12
22	44	(Japan) Shota Mizuno	7	C	6						10
23	910	(Japan) Tomohiko Sunako	5	C							8
24	60	(Japan) Kumi Sato	Ret	C	10	11	12	7	9		7
24	60	(Japan) Akira Watanabe				11	12	7	9		7
26	9	(Japan) Yukihiro Hane			13	DNS	Ret	DNA	7		4
26	9	(Japan) Naohiro Kawano				DNS	Ret	DNA	7		4
28	9/99	(Japan) Tsunefumi Hioki	12		13		10	8			4
29	99	(Japan) Akira Yoshitomi						8			3
30	911/99	(Japan) Kiichi Takahashi	9	C	11	Ret	10		11		3
30	51	(Japan) Masamitsu Ishihara		C	Ret	10	9		Ret		3
32	70	(Japan) Yoshimi Ishibashi (Belgium) Patrick van Schoote	10	C	Ret	12	Ret	Ret	10		2
33	51	(Japan) "OSAMU"						10			1
NC	10	(Japan) Hidehiko Aso (Japan) Akira Ishikawa	11	C	12	Ret	11	Ret	17		0
NC	911	(Japan) Hirotaka Nakajima			11	Ret	DNA	DNA			0
NC	911	(Japan) Kazushige Saito							11		0
NC	9	(Japan) Shuroku Sasaki	12	C							0
NC	117	(Japan) Toshihiro Fukazawa (Japan) Tetsuo Kozai		C		18	13	DNA	15		0
NC	11	(Japan) Hiromoto Ishimori (Japan) Kazuo Miura		C		13					0
NC	79	(Japan) Masanori Sugiyama (Japan) Hiroyasu Aoyagi		C		14					0
NC	72	(New Zealand) Mark Porter			DNQ	Ret	15	Ret	Ret		0
NC	72	(Japan) Isao Hirano					15	Ret	Ret		0
NC	17	(Japan) Toshihiko Nogami	Ret	C		15	DNA	DNA	DNA		0
NC	17	(Japan) Masaaki Nagashima		C		15	DNA	DNA	DNA		0
NC	24	(Japan) Toshiyuki Hirano (Japan) Teruhiko Someba		C		16					0
NC	28/355	(Japan) Hiroaki Suga		C	DNA	NC	DNA	DNA	Ret		0
NC	355	(Japan) Takayuki Ohi				NC					0
NC	27	(Japan) Tetsuya Ota	Ret	C							0
NC	27	(Sweden) Anders Olofsson	Ret								0
NC	17	(Japan) Tomoyuki Hosono	Ret								0
NC	60	(Japan) Masaoki Nagashima	Ret								0
NC	72	(Japan) Yoshimi Katayama			DNQ	Ret					0
NC	9	(Japan) Hideaki Ichimura		C							0
NC	27	(Sweden) Steven Andskär		C							0
NC	28	(Japan) Masahiro Yamazaki		C		DNA					0
NC	60	(Japan) Junko Mihara		C							0
NC	280	(Japan) Hajime Oshiro (Japan) Mamoru Suzuki				DNQ					0
NC	355	(Japan) Tatsuyuki Fujiwara					DNA	DNA			0
Rank	No.	Driver	SUZ (Japan)	FUJ (Japan)	SEN (Japan)	FUJ (Japan)	MOT (Japan)	MIN (Japan)	SUG (Japan)	TAI (Japan)	Pts.

==== GT300 Teams' standings ====
For teams that entered multiple cars, only the best result from each round counted towards the teams' championship.

Rank	Team	No.	SUZ (Japan)	FUJ (Japan)	SEN (Japan)	FUJ (Japan)	MOT (Japan)	MIN (Japan)	SUG (Japan)	TAI (Japan)	PTS
1	Team Taisan Jr. with Tsuchiya	25	1	C	1	1	6	1	1	1	106
2	Racing Project Bandoh	19				7	2	2	3		46
3	MOMOCORSE A'PEX	44	7	C	6	2	4	4	Ret		45
4	Hitotsuyama Racing	21	Ret	C	5	3	5	5	5		44
5	Team Taeivon Ralliart	61	3	C	7	Ret	Ret	6	2	Ret	37
6	Xanavi Racing with Nismo Jr.	15	4	C	2	NC	14	Ret	4	3	35
7	910 Racing	910	5	C	4	8	3	Ret	14		33
7	910 Racing	911	9	C	11	Ret	DNA	Ret	11		33
8	RE Amemiya Racing	7	Ret	C	3	5	Ret	9	6	2	28
9	Team Daishin	81	Ret	C	Ret	6	8	3	8	4	24
10	Cusco Racing	77	8	C	Ret	17	1	Ret	12	Ret	23
11	Cobra Racing Team	51	2	C	Ret	10	9	10	Ret		19
12	First Racing Team	91	6	C	8	9	7	Ret	13		15
13	SigmaTec Racing Team	71	Ret	C	9	4	DNA	DNA	16		12
14	Team Daikokuya	9	12	C	13	DNS	Ret	DNA	7		8
14	Team Daikokuya	99					10	8			8
15	KRAFT	60	Ret	C	10	11	12	7	9		7
16	Team Gaikokuya	70	10	C	Ret	12	Ret	Ret	10		2
-	Ability Motorsport	10	11	C	12	Ret	11	Ret	17		0
-	M Factory Racing Club	11		C		13					0
-	Alta Racing Team	117		C		18	13	DNA	15		0
-	NAC West	79		C		14					0
-	Kageisen Racing Team	17		C		15	DNA	DNA	DNA		0
-	Okura Rotary Racing	72			DNQ	Ret	15	Ret	Ret		0
-	Hirano Motorsport	24		C		16					0
-	Yellow Magic	355				NC	DNA	DNA	Ret		0
-	Team Ferrari Club of Japan	27	Ret	C	WD						0
-	Team Ferrari Club of Japan	28		C							0
-	NSX Dream28 Competition	280				DNQ					0
Rank	Team	No.	SUZ (Japan)	FUJ (Japan)	SEN (Japan)	FUJ (Japan)	MOT (Japan)	MIN (Japan)	SUG (Japan)	TAI (Japan)	PTS
