= Hideki Noda =

Japanese racing driver (born 1969)

Hideki Noda 野田 英樹
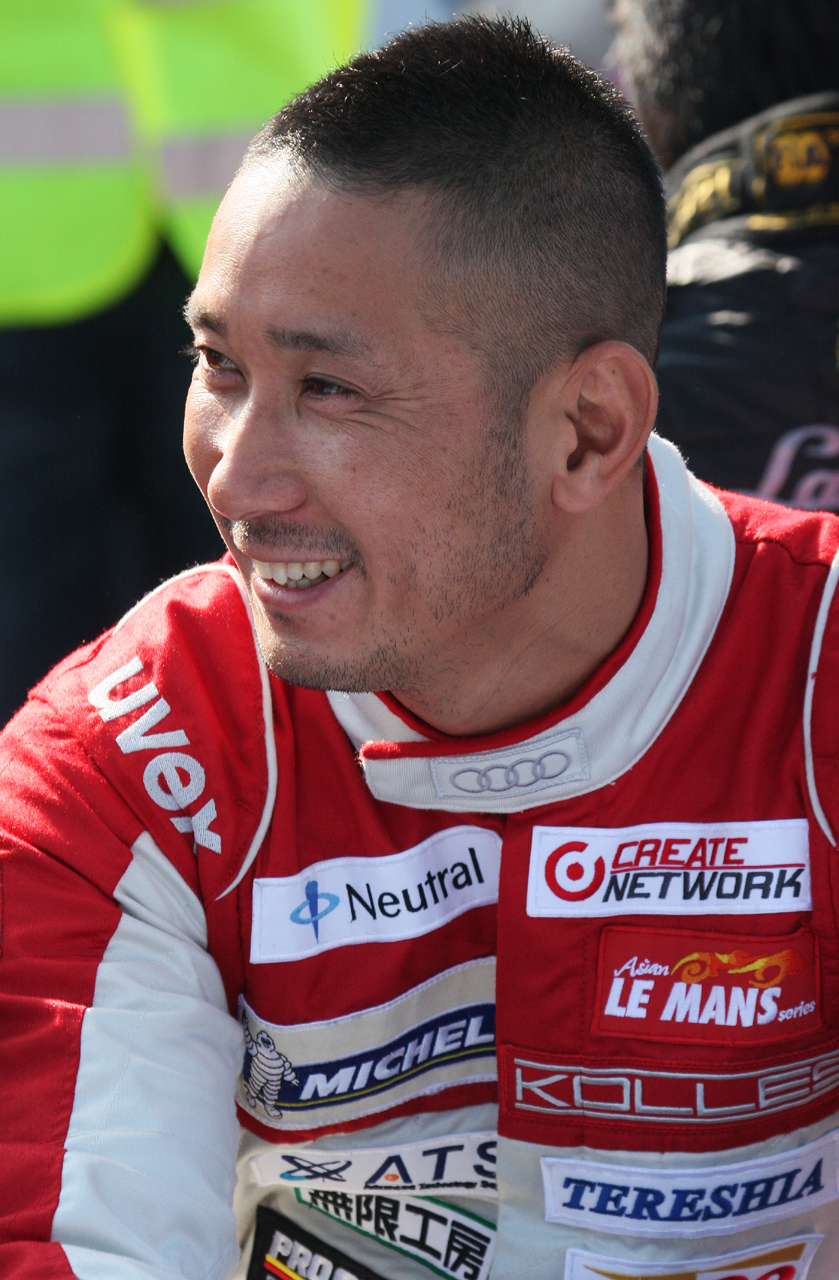
- Noda in 2009
- Born: 7 March 1969 (age 57); Osaka, Japan
- Relatives: Juju Noda (daughter)

Formula One World Championship career
- Nationality: Japanese
- Active years: 1994
- Team: Larrousse
- Entries: 3
- Championships: 0
- Wins: 0
- Podiums: 0
- Career points: 0
- Pole positions: 0
- Fastest laps: 0
- First entry: 1994 European Grand Prix
- Last entry: 1994 Australian Grand Prix

24 Hours of Le Mans career
- Years: 2008–2010
- Teams: Kruse Schiller Motorsport (KSM)
- Best finish: 26th (2010)
- Class wins: 0

Hideki Noda (野田 英樹, Noda Hideki; born 7 March 1969) is a Japanese professional racing driver. He participated in three Formula One Grands Prix, debuting in the 1994 European Grand Prix, but did not score any championship points. He replaced Yannick Dalmas in the Larrousse car for the last three Grands Prix of the season, but failed to finish in any of the three races. In 1995, he joined Simtek as a test driver, hoping to get some races in. However, the Kobe earthquake and the folding of the Simtek team ended his brief Formula 1 career.

A year later, Noda went to America and raced in the Indy Lights and became the only Japanese driver to win a CART-sanctioned event. After a few years in America, Noda moved back to Japan, where he drove a Team Cerumo Toyota Supra with Hironori Takeuchi. In the annual non-championship All-Star event at Aida, Noda and Takeuchi were forced out with mechanical problems. In 1999, he joined the Esso Tiger Team Le Mans under Koichiro Mori, again to drive a Toyota Supra, ex-Australian V8 Supercar driver Wayne Gardner. The highlight of their season was a win at Fuji. With 33 points, they were equal seventeenth in the series.

In 2002, Noda returned to the United States and drove in six Indy Racing League IndyCar Series races for Convergent Racing and Indy Regency Racing with a best finish of tenth at Phoenix International Raceway while with Convergent. He also competed in a round of the inaugural A1 Grand Prix season with Japan at Lausitz, where he scored three points for the Japanese team.

== Career ==
=== Early career ===
Noda began his racing career in karts winning the 1982 Kansai Kart Land J-class, the 1985 Kansai Kart Land A1-class, and the 1986 Kansai Kart Land A2-class. The following year, he joined Formula Junior 1600 and became Rookie of the Year.

=== Formula One (1994-1995) ===
Noda replaced French driver Yannick Dalmas at Larrousse towards the end of the 1994 season at the European Grand Prix in Jerez. After qualifying 24th behind his teammate Érik Comas, he retired due to gearbox failure. At his home race in Japan, Noda was 23rd on the grid but retired again due, this time due to an electrical fault. His last Grand Prix saw him 23rd on the grid at Adelaide, this time out qualifying his new teammate Jean-Denis Délétraz. Noda again retired, this time due to an oil leak.

In 1995, Noda was due to drive for Simtek in Canada, but the team withdrew from F1 before he could. In his last attempt to drive in F1, he was denied his super license, preventing him from driving for Forti at the TI Circuit for the Pacific Grand Prix.

=== A1 Grand Prix (2005–2009) ===
In 2005, Noda was announced as the second driver for the Japan entry for the 2005-06 A1 Grand Prix season, second to Ryo Fukuda. His first race for the team came at the second round at Lausitz, where he qualified in 21st place. In sprint race, Noda managed to move up eleven places to finish tenth and score one point for Japan. The feature race saw Noda finish one place higher in ninth place, scoring a further two points for the Japanese A1 GP team. Japan finished 21st at the end of the season, with eight points.

== Personal life ==
Noda's daughter Juju is also a racing driver, who competed in the W Series, the Super Formula Championship, and also the F2000 Italian Formula Trophy, where she became champion in 2023 for Noda's own racing team, Noda Racing (now known as Triple Tree Racing).

== Racing record ==
=== Complete Japanese Formula 3 Championship results ===
(key) (Races in bold indicate pole position) (Races in italics indicate fastest lap)

Year	Team	Engine	1	2	3	4	5	6	7	8	9	10	DC	Pts
1988	JAX Racing Team with TOM'S	Toyota	SUZ; Ret	TSU; 3	FUJ; Ret	SUZ; 9	SUG; DNS	TSU; 17	SEN; 9	SUZ; DSQ	NIS; 8	SUZ	10th	4

=== Complete British Formula Three Championship results ===
(key) (Races in bold indicate pole position) (Races in italics indicate fastest lap)

Year	Team	Engine	Class	1	2	3	4	5	6	7	8	9	10	11	12	13	14	15	16	17	DC	Pts
1990	Alan Docking Racing	Mugen	A	DON; 7	SIL; 6	THR; Ret	BRH; DNS	SIL; 6	BRH; 9	THR; 11	SIL; 16	DON; Ret	SIL; Ret	SNE; Ret	OUL; 6	SIL; 5	BRH; 11	DON; 4	THR; 10	SIL; Ret	12th	8
1991	Alan Docking Racing	Mugen	A	SIL; 2	THR; 4	DON; Ret	BRH; 10	BRH; 5	THR; 4	SIL; 4	DON; 7	SIL; 4	SIL; 5	SNE; 12	SIL; 1	BRH; 7	DON; 7	SIL; 5	THR; 4		7th	36

=== Complete International Formula 3000 results ===
(key) (Races in bold indicate pole position) (Races in italics indicate fastest lap)

Year	Entrant	1	2	3	4	5	6	7	8	9	10	DC	Points
1992	3001 International	SIL; Ret	PAU; DNQ	CAT; Ret	PER; Ret	HOC; DNS	NÜR; 14	SPA; 17	ALB; 12	NOG; Ret	MAG; 8	23rd	0
1993	TOM's	DON; Ret	SIL; 11	PAU; 9	PER	HOC; Ret	NÜR; 19	SPA; 15	MAG; Ret	NOG; 11		25th	0
1994	Forti Corse	SIL; 5	PAU; Ret	CAT; Ret	PER; 3	HOC; Ret	SPA; 7	EST; 16†	MAG; 11			10th	6

=== Complete Japanese Formula 3000/Formula Nippon results ===
(key) (Races in bold indicate pole position) (Races in italics indicate fastest lap)

Year	Entrant	1	2	3	4	5	6	7	8	9	10	11	DC	Points
1993	TOM'S	SUZ	FUJ	MIN	SUZ	AUT	SUG	FUJ	FUJ	SUZ	FUJ; 19	SUZ; Ret	NC	0
1998	Team Cerumo	SUZ; 5	MIN; Ret	FUJ; 5	MOT; 6	SUZ; Ret	SUG; 3	FUJ; C	**MIN**; Ret	FUJ; 9	SUZ; Ret		10th	9
1999	Impul	SUZ; Ret	MOT; 16	MIN; 13	FUJ; 14	SUZ; 6	SUG; Ret	FUJ; Ret	MIN; 2	MOT; 9	SUZ; 11		11th	7
2000	Team LeMans	SUZ; Ret	MOT; 10	MIN; 3	FUJ; 15	SUZ; 2	SUG; Ret	MOT; 5	FUJ; 6	MIN; 17	SUZ; 5		5th	15
2001	DoCoMo Team Dandelion	SUZ; Ret	MOT; Ret	MIN; Ret	FUJ; 13	SUZ; 12	SUG; Ret	FUJ; 13	MIN; Ret	MOT; Ret	SUZ; 11		21st	0
2003	Team MOHN	SUZ; 6	FUJ; 10	MIN; 8	MOT; Ret	SUZ; 12	SUG; Ret	FUJ; Ret	MIN; 10	MOT; Ret	SUZ; 10		13th	1
2004	Team MOHN	SUZ; 9	SUG; 8	MOT; 11	SUZ; Ret	SUG; 12	MIN; Ret	SEP; Ret	MOT; 11	SUZ; 14			15th	0
2005	Team MOHN	MOT; Ret	SUZ; Ret	SUG; 10	FUJ; Ret	SUZ; 9	MIN; Ret	FUJ; 10	MOT; 8	SUZ; 13			16th	0

=== Complete Formula One results ===
(key)

Year	Entrant	Chassis	Engine	1	2	3	4	5	6	7	8	9	10	11	12	13	14	15	16	WDC	Points
1994	Tourtel Larrousse F1	Larrousse LH94	Ford V8	BRA	PAC	SMR	MON	ESP	CAN	FRA	GBR	GER	HUN	BEL	ITA	POR	EUR; Ret	JPN; Ret	AUS; Ret	NC	0

=== American open-wheel racing results ===
(key) (Races in bold indicate pole position) (Races in italics indicate fastest lap)

==== Indy Lights ====
Year	Team	1	2	3	4	5	6	7	8	9	10	11	12	13	Rank	Points
1996	Indy Regency Racing	MIA; 11	LBH; 16	NAZ; 7	MIS; 13	MIL; 12	DET; 16	POR; 20	CLE; 5	TOR; 3	TRO; 12	VAN; 13	LS; 15		14th	34
1997	Indy Regency Racing	MIA; 18	LBH; 19	NAZ; 16	SAV; 6	STL; 16	MIL; 14	DET; 14	POR; 1	TOR; 15	TRO; 6	VAN; 3	LS; 12	FON	9th	51

==== Indy Racing League ====
Year	Team	No.	Chassis	Engine	1	2	3	4	5	6	7	8	9	10	11	12	13	14	15	Rank	Points	Ref
2002	Convergent Racing	20	G-Force	Chevrolet	HMS; 23	PHX; 10	FON; 25	NZR	INDY	TXS	PPI	RIR	KAN	NSH	MIS	KTY				32nd	54	
2002	Indy Regency Racing	28	G-Force	Chevrolet													STL; 17	CHI; 24	TX2; 27	32nd	54	

=== Complete JGTC/Super GT results ===
(key) (Races in bold indicate pole position) (Races in italics indicate fastest lap)

Year	Team	Car	Class	1	2	3	4	5	6	7	8	9	DC	Points
1998	Team Cerumo	Toyota Supra	GT500	SUZ; 9	FUJ; C	SEN; Ret	FUJ; Ret	MOT; 5	MIN; 12	SUG; 3			11th	22
1999	Team LeMans	Toyota Supra	GT500	SUZ	FUJ; 8	**SUG**; 16	MIN; 5	FUJ; 1	TAI; 9	MOT; 13			12th	33
2000	Team LeMans	Toyota Supra	GT500	MOT; 8	FUJ; 4	SUG; 7	FUJ; 15	TAI; 7	MIN; 5	SUZ; 6			9th	35
2001	Team LeMans	Toyota Supra	GT500	TAI; Ret	**FUJ**; 1	SUG; 5	FUJ; 3	MOT; 13	SUZ; Ret	MIN; 14			7th	40
2002	TOM'S	Toyota Supra	GT500	TAI	FUJ	SUG	SEP	FUJ	MOT	MIN	SUZ; 16		NC	0
2003	Team Tsuchiya	Toyota Supra	GT500	TAI	FUJ; Ret	SUG	FUJ	FUJ	MOT	AUT	SUZ		NC	0
2005	Team Tsuchiya	Toyota Supra	GT500	OKA	FUJ	SEP	SUG	MOT	FUJ; Ret	AUT	SUZ		20th	1
2006	Team Tsuchiya	Toyota Supra	GT500	SUZ	OKA	FUJ	SEP	SUG	SUZ; Ret	MOT	AUT	FUJ	28th	5
2012	Hitotsuyama Racing	Audi R8 LMS	GT300	OKA; 18	FUJ; 16	SEP	SUG	SUZ	FUJ	AUT	MOT		NC	0

=== 24 Hours of Le Mans results ===
Year	Team	Co-Drivers	Car	Class	Laps	Pos.	Class Pos.
2008	(Germany) Kruse Schiller Motorsport	(France) Jean de Pourtales (Denmark) Allan Simonsen	Lola B05/40-Mazda	LMP2	147	DNF	
2009	(Germany) Kruse Schiller Motorsport	(France) Jean de Pourtales (Hong Kong) Matthew Marsh	Lola B07/46-Mazda	LMP2	261	DNF	
2010	(Germany) Kruse Schiller Motorsport	(France) Jean de Pourtales (United Kingdom) Jonathan Kennard	Lola B07/40-Judd	LMP2	291	26th	10th
