= Fariman (disambiguation) =

Fariman is a city in Razavi Khorasan Province, Iran.

Fariman (Persian: فريمان) may also refer to:

- Fariman, North Khorasan
- Fariman, Joghatai, Razavi Khorasan Province
- Fariman County, in Razavi Khorasan Province
- Fariman Rural District

== See also ==
- Firman, a royal mandate of Islamic ruler
- Farman, French aircraft manufacturer
- Ferman, a name
- Firman (surname)
- Farman (surname)
