= 2001 Formula Nippon Championship =

The 2001 Formula Nippon Championship was the twenty-ninth season of premier Japanese single-seater racing, and the sixth under the Formula Nippon moniker. It was contested over ten rounds at five venues. 11 different teams, 23 different drivers, and two different chassis suppliers competed in the series. This would be the last season with multiple chassis suppliers after G-Force Technologies stopped supplying chassis after 2001.

Satoshi Motoyama of Team Impul won his second series championship.

== Teams and drivers ==
All teams used tyres supplied by Bridgestone and Mugen MF308 engines.

Team	#	Driver	Chassis	Rounds
PIAA Nakajima Racing	1	(Japan) Tsugio Matsuda	Reynard 2KL	All
PIAA Nakajima Racing	2	(Republic of Ireland) Ralph Firman Jr.	Reynard 99L	All
Olympic Kondo Racing Team	3	(Japan) Yuji Tachikawa	Reynard 99L	All
Olympic Kondo Racing Team	4	(Japan) Katsutomo Kaneishi	Reynard 99L	All
Team 5ZIGEN	5	(Japan) Naoki Hattori	Reynard 99L	All
Team 5ZIGEN	6	(Germany) Michael Krumm	Reynard 99L; Reynard 01L	All
Team LeMans	7	(Malaysia) Alex Yoong	Reynard 99L	1–6
Team LeMans	7	(Japan) Koji Yamanishi	Reynard 99L	7–10
Team LeMans	8	(Japan) Yudai Igarashi	Reynard 99L	All
Team Morinaga Nova	9	(United Kingdom) Richard Lyons	G-Force GF03C	All
Team Morinaga Nova	10	(Portugal) André Couto	G-Force GF03C; Reynard 99L	All
Cosmo Oil Racing Team Cerumo	11	(Japan) Masami Kageyama	Reynard 99L	All
Cosmo Oil Racing Team Cerumo	12	(Japan) Seiji Ara	Reynard 99L	All
Mooncraft	14	(Japan) Ryō Michigami	Reynard 01L	2–10
excite Team Impul	19	(Japan) Satoshi Motoyama	Reynard 01L	All
excite Team Impul	20	(India) Narain Karthikeyan	Reynard 99L	All
Takagi B-1 Car Club	36	(Japan) Tetsuji Tamanaka	Reynard 2KL; Reynard 99L	All
Takagi B-1 Car Club	37	(Japan) Masahiko Kageyama	Reynard 99L	All
Autobacs Racing Team Aguri	55	(Japan) Juichi Wakisaka	Reynard 99L	All
Autobacs Racing Team Aguri	56	(Japan) Takeshi Tsuchiya	Reynard 99L	All
DoCoMo Team Dandelion Racing	68	(Japan) Hideki Noda	Reynard 2KL	All
DoCoMo Team Dandelion Racing	69	(Poland) Jaroslaw Wierczuk	Reynard 99L	1–4
DoCoMo Team Dandelion Racing	69	(Japan) Hidetoshi Mitsusada	Reynard 99L	5

== Race calendar and results ==
All races were held in Japan.

Race	Track	Date	Pole position	Fastest race lap	Winning driver	Winning team
1	Suzuka Circuit	25 March	(Japan) Naoki Hattori	(Japan) Juichi Wakisaka	(Japan) Naoki Hattori	Team 5ZIGEN
2	Twin Ring Motegi	22 April	(Japan) Satoshi Motoyama	(Japan) Juichi Wakisaka	(Japan) Naoki Hattori	Team 5ZIGEN
3	Mine Circuit	20 May	(Japan) Satoshi Motoyama	(Japan) Satoshi Motoyama	(Japan) Satoshi Motoyama	excite Team Impul
4	Fuji Speedway	3 June	(Japan) Satoshi Motoyama	(Japan) Naoki Hattori	(Japan) Naoki Hattori	Team 5ZIGEN
5	Suzuka-East Circuit	1 July	(Japan) Ryō Michigami	(Republic of Ireland) Ralph Firman Jr.	(Japan) Satoshi Motoyama	excite Team Impul
6	Sportsland SUGO	29 July	(Japan) Juichi Wakisaka	(Japan) Juichi Wakisaka	(Japan) Satoshi Motoyama	excite Team Impul
7	Fuji Speedway	2 September	(Japan) Juichi Wakisaka	(Japan) Juichi Wakisaka	(Japan) Juichi Wakisaka	Autobacs Racing Team Aguri
8	Mine Circuit	23 September	(Japan) Juichi Wakisaka	(Japan) Ryō Michigami	(Japan) Satoshi Motoyama	excite Team Impul
9	Twin Ring Motegi	21 October	(Republic of Ireland) Ralph Firman Jr.	(Japan) Juichi Wakisaka	(Republic of Ireland) Ralph Firman Jr.	PIAA Nakajima Racing
10	Suzuka Circuit	18 November	(Japan) Tsugio Matsuda	(Germany) Michael Krumm	(Republic of Ireland) Ralph Firman Jr.	PIAA Nakajima Racing

Note:

Juichi Wakisaka set the fastest lap in Round 8 but was later disqualified.

== Championship standings ==
=== Drivers' Championship ===
Scoring system

Position	1st	2nd	3rd	4th	5th	6th
Points	10	6	4	3	2	1

Rank	Name	SUZ	MOT	MIN	FUJ	SUZ	SGO	FUJ	MIN	MOT	SUZ	Points
1	(Japan) Satoshi Motoyama	Ret	9	1	Ret	1	1	4	1	2	Ret	49
2	(Japan) Naoki Hattori	1	1	5	1	8	7	12	6	Ret	10	33
3	(Japan) Yuji Tachikawa	13	2	11	Ret	4	4	2	3	5	2	30
4	(Republic of Ireland) Ralph Firman Jr.	5	Ret	2	6	Ret	Ret	7	Ret	1	1	29
5	(Japan) Juichi Wakisaka	2	10	12	Ret	6	2	1	DSQ	Ret	Ret	23
6	(Japan) Ryō Michigami		Ret	10	3	2	3	Ret	Ret	3	3	22
7	(Germany) Michael Krumm	Ret	4	4	2	Ret	6	3	Ret	7	4	20
8	(Japan) Takeshi Tsuchiya	10	Ret	3	Ret	3	Ret	14	2	6	5	17
9	(Japan) Masami Kageyama	4	5	6	5	Ret	11	6	4	8	7	12
10	(Japan) Tsugio Matsuda	Ret	3	8	Ret	5	5	Ret	Ret	9	9	8
11	(Portugal) André Couto	Ret	Ret	Ret	12	Ret	Ret	5	Ret	4	14	5
12	(Japan) Seiji Ara	3	Ret	Ret	Ret	9	10	8	Ret	12	Ret	4
13	(Japan) Katsutomo Kaneishi	7	6	Ret	4	Ret	9	11	Ret	11	13	4
14	(Japan) Koji Yamanishi							10	5	10	Ret	2
15	(India) Narain Karthikeyan	6	7	9	Ret	Ret	Ret	9	Ret	Ret	6	2
16	(Malaysia) Alex Yoong	11	Ret	7	7	10	Ret					0
17	(Japan) Yudai Igarashi	9	Ret	Ret	11	7	8	Ret	Ret	Ret	8	0
18	(Japan) Tetsuji Tamanaka	15	Ret	14	8	Ret	15	15	7	15	Ret	0
19	(United Kingdom) Richard Lyons	8	8	Ret	9	11	12	Ret	Ret	13	12	0
20	(Japan) Masahiko Kageyama	12	Ret	Ret	10	DNS	14	16	Ret	Ret	Ret	0
21	(Japan) Hideki Noda	Ret	Ret	Ret	13	12	Ret	13	Ret	Ret	11	0
22	(Poland) Jaroslaw Wierczuk	14	Ret	13	DNS							0
23	(Japan) Hidetoshi Mitsusada					13						0

=== Teams' Championship ===
Rank	Team	Car	SUZ	MOT	MIN	FUJ	SUZ	SGO	FUJ	MIN	MOT	SUZ	Points
1	5ZIGEN	5	1	1	5	1	8	7	12	6	Ret	10	53
1	5ZIGEN	6	Ret	4	4	2	Ret	6	3	Ret	7	4	53
2	excite Impul	19	Ret	9	1	Ret	1	1	4	1	2	Ret	51
2	excite Impul	20	6	7	9	Ret	Ret	Ret	9	Ret	Ret	6	51
3	ARTA	55	2	10	12	Ret	6	2	1	DSQ	Ret	Ret	40
3	ARTA	56	10	Ret	3	Ret	3	Ret	14	2	6	5	40
4	PIAA Nakajima	1	Ret	3	8	Ret	5	5	Ret	Ret	9	9	37
4	PIAA Nakajima	2	5	Ret	2	6	Ret	Ret	7	Ret	1	1	37
5	Olympic Kondo	3	13	2	11	Ret	4	4	2	3	5	2	34
5	Olympic Kondo	4	7	6	Ret	4	Ret	9	11	Ret	11	13	34
6	Mooncraft	14		Ret	10	3	2	3	Ret	Ret	3	3	22
7	Cosmo Oil Cerumo	11	4	5	6	5	Ret	11	6	4	8	7	16
7	Cosmo Oil Cerumo	12	3	Ret	Ret	Ret	9	10	8	Ret	12	Ret	16
8	Team Morinaga Nova	9	8	8	Ret	9	11	12	Ret	Ret	13	12	5
8	Team Morinaga Nova	10	Ret	Ret	Ret	12	Ret	Ret	5	Ret	4	14	5
9	LeMans	7	11	Ret	7	7	10	Ret	10	5	10	Ret	2
9	LeMans	8	9	Ret	Ret	11	7	8	Ret	Ret	Ret	8	2
10	Takagi B-1 Racing	36	15	Ret	14	8	Ret	15	15	7	15	Ret	0
10	Takagi B-1 Racing	37	12	Ret	Ret	10	DNS	14	16	Ret	Ret	Ret	0
11	DoCoMo Dandelion	68	Ret	Ret	Ret	13	12	Ret	13	Ret	Ret	11	0
11	DoCoMo Dandelion	69	14	Ret	13	DNS	13						0
