= Autobacs Racing Team Aguri =

Japanese motorsport team

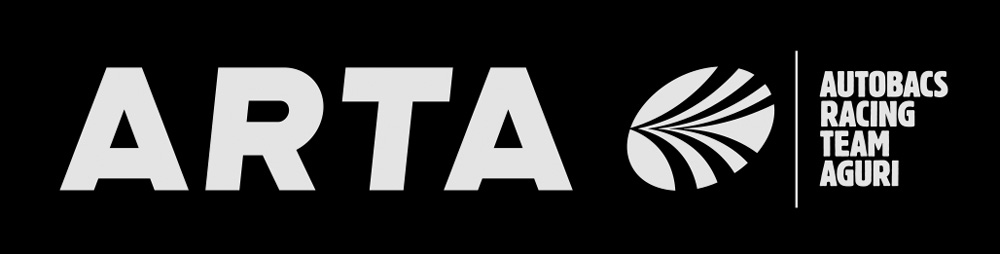
- Founded: October 1997
- Founder(s): Aguri Suzuki
- Team principal(s): Aguri Suzuki
- Current series: Super GT
- Former series: JGTC; Formula Nippon; Indy Racing League; All Japan Formula Three Championship; Formula Challenge Japan; Formula Dream
- Current drivers: Car #8: Kakunoshin Ohta; Hiroki Otsu; Car #16: Tomoki Nojiri; Ren Sato
- Teams' Championships: Super GT: GT500: 2007; GT300: 2019
- Drivers' Championships: Super GT: GT500: 2007; GT300: 2002, 2019; Formula Challenge Japan: 2009, 2012; Formula Dream: 1999
- Website: www.alnex.jp

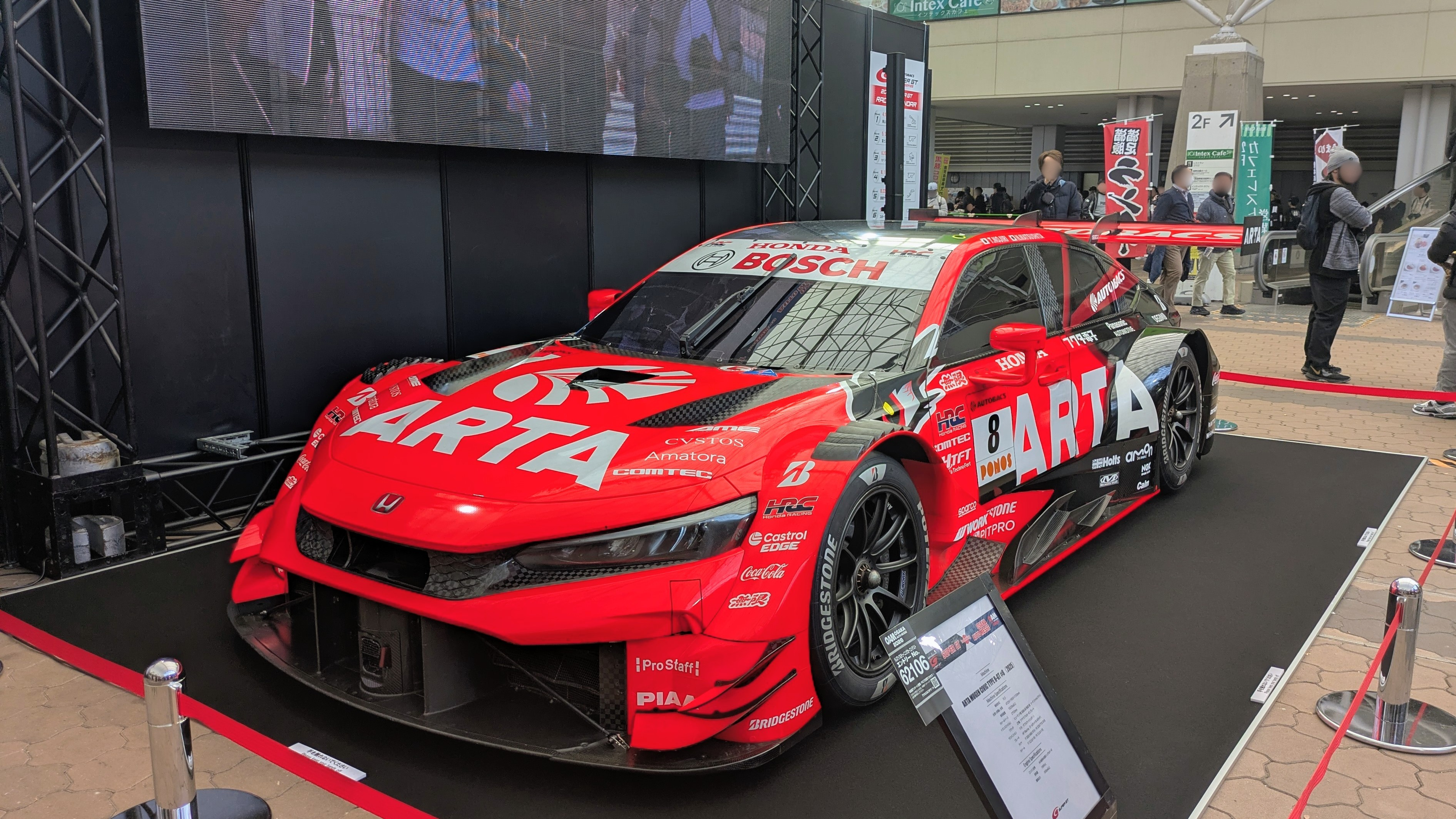
ARTA's Civic Type R GT500 in 2025

Autobacs Racing Team Aguri (ARTA) is a joint racing project formed between former F1 driver Aguri Suzuki and Autobacs in 1997. The team's original name was "ARTA F1 Project," but due to trademark claims based on the usage of the word "F1", the name has since been shortened to "ARTA". ARTA was the 2007 Super GT GT500 series champion in both the drivers' and team championship.

== History ==
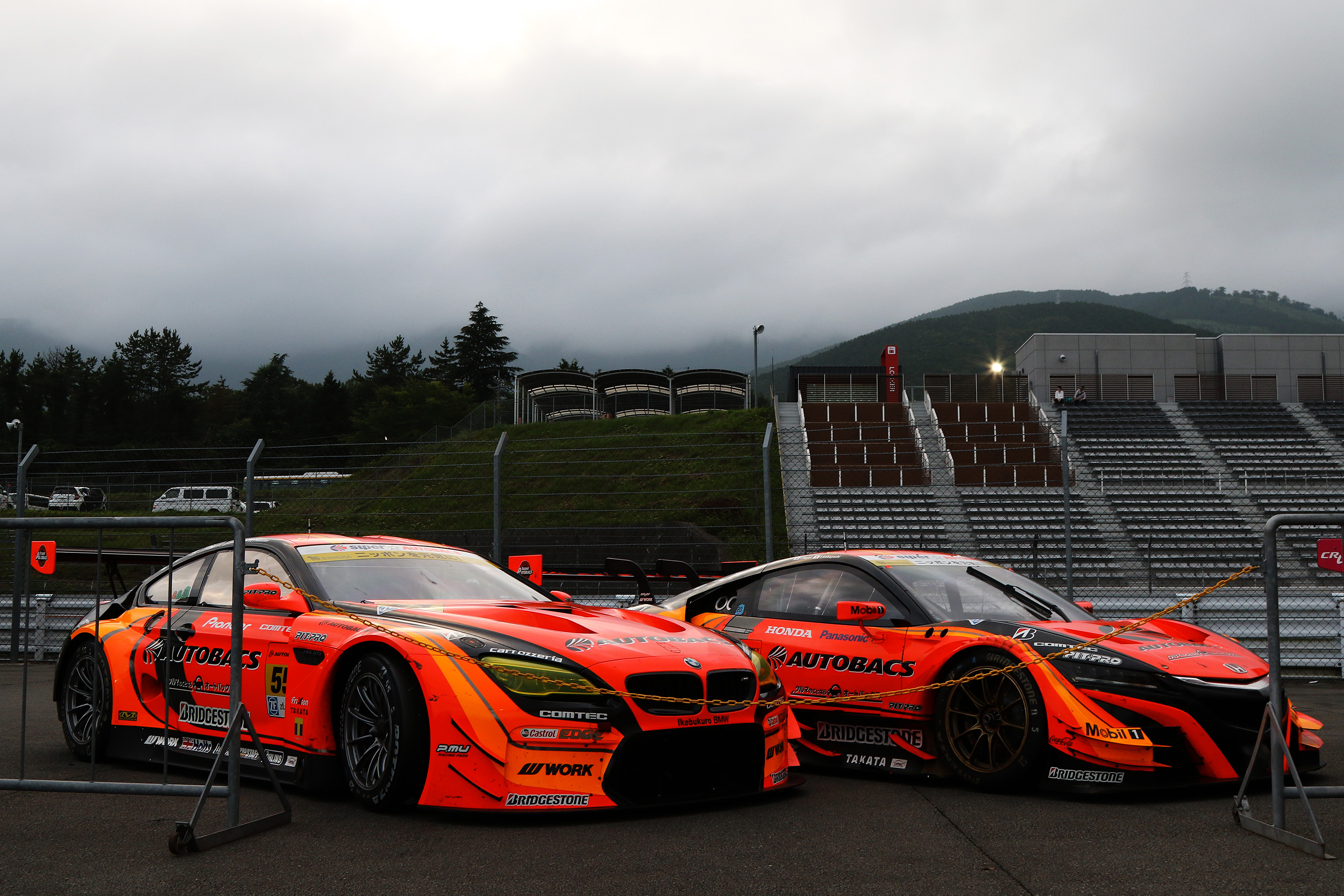
ARTA's GT500 class Winner NSX-GT and GT300 class Winner BMW M6 GT3 at Fuji Speedway in 2017

The team was created with the objective of developing drivers that could compete in the highest levels of F1 racing. In addition to competing in racing competitions such as Formula Nippon and Super GT, the team also holds its youth kart racing competition, the "ARTA Challenge," to find the next generation of competitive race drivers.

Toshihiro Kaneishi, a driver who received support from ARTA, won the German Formula Three Championship in 2001.

The team maintained a close relationship with Aguri Suzuki's F1 team, Super Aguri F1, before they were forced to withdraw from Formula One in 2008. ARTA is currently the largest racing team in Japan.

== Super GT ==
=== GT500 ===
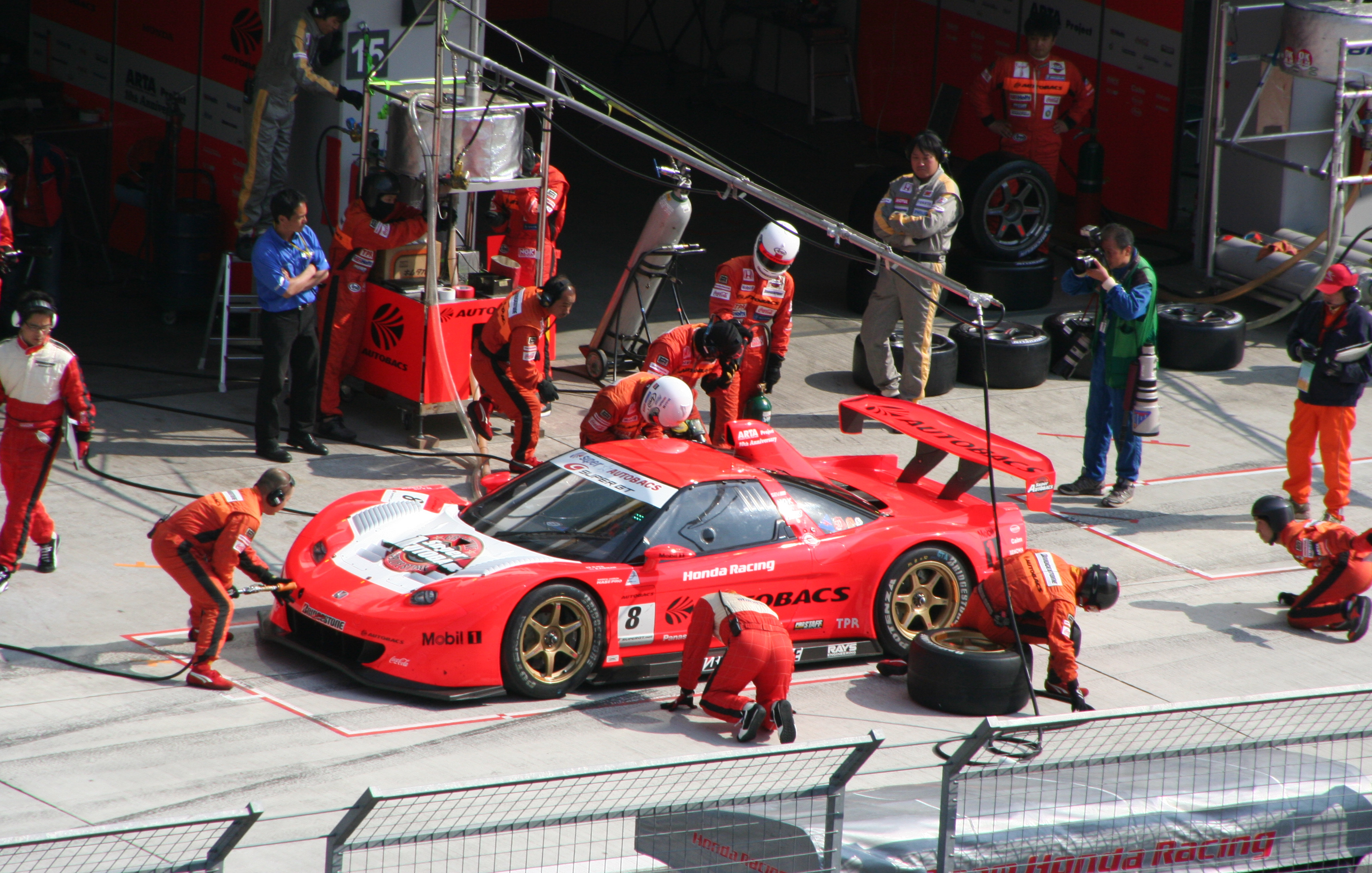
ARTA's Honda NSX which competed in the GT500 class of the Super GT series.

The team participated with the Nissan Skyline GT-R from 1998 to 1999. In 2000, the team joined up with Honda, and began using the Honda NSX. Owner Aguri Suzuki and Keiichi Tsuchiya drove in the first year with Honda, and Katsutomo Kaneishi replaced Aguri in 2001. In 2003, Kaneishi moved on to participate in the DTM series, and his cousin, Toshihiro Kaneishi, took over as driver. Tsuchiya also announced his retirement the same year. Katsutomo Kaneishi returned from DTM in 2004, and became driver along with Daisuke Ito. Tsuchiya became team director this year, but various mechanical failures caused the team to win only 2 points in the entire competition. In 2005, ARTA became a Honda team (Team Honda Racing), along with Takata Dome NSX. Aguri returned as team director, with Ito and Ralph Firman as drivers. The team took pole position 3 times, and was competitive all season. The team won the 7th race at Autopolis. ARTA kept the same drivers for 2006, but was unable to win the competition despite taking the pole position several times. The team did win the 4th race at Sepang. Team Honda Racing was dissolved in 2007, and ARTA participated in the competition with the same lineup as 2006. They won 3 races during the season on their way to championship victory. For 2008 Firman is joined by class newcomer Takuya Izawa while former driver Daisuke Ito left the team to drive for ENEOS TOYOTA Team LeMans.

=== GT300 ===
The team made its debut in 2001 with the Toyota MR-S, and became series champion in 2002 with drivers Morio Nitta and Shinichi Takagi.

In 2003, ARTA participated with the ASL Garaiya, which had been developed by Autobacs. The machine showed good cornering, but the Nissan SR engine lacked power, resulting in a poor finish. In 2004, the team switched over to the Nissan VQ engine, and won two consecutive races. However, they failed to win the competition by a margin of 1 point. In 2005, the team was leading in points at the 7th race, (Autopolis) but lost in the final race to place 3rd in the final standings. The team director had announced during the season that the team would be dissolved if they failed to become champion, leading ARTA to end its participation in the GT300 series.

However, in 2007, Aguri Suzuki announced that he would like to race the Garaiya to commemorate the ten-year anniversary of the start of ARTA, and the team renewed its participation in the series with the same lineup as 2005. The Garaiya won the 3rd race at Fuji Speedway but crashed in all of the proceeding races and was forced to retire from the competition. The Garaiya was replaced by the Honda CR-Z GT for 2013 (with the car renumbered from #43 to #55), followed by BMW M6 GT3 in 2016 and Honda NSX GT3 in 2019, winning the GT300 championship that year.

== IndyCar Series ==
ARTA first entered the IndyCar Series in 2003, backing a car driven by Japanese-American Roger Yasukawa that was prepared by Fernandez Racing. This car was called "Super Aguri Fernandez Racing" and Aguri Suzuki was listed as a team owner. Despite the partnership, Autobacs Racing Team Aguri didn't have de facto ownership stake with Fernandez Racing. In 2004, Yasukawa was replaced by Kosuke Matsuura, who won rookie of the year honors for both the Indianapolis 500 and the league, and finishing fourth at Kentucky. Matsuura continued with Aguri in 2005 and 2006, scoring several top 10s but no top 5s.

In 2007, ARTA and Aguri switched their support from Fernandez to Panther Racing, bringing Matsuura with them. He scored a fourth-place finish at Michigan and a fifth at Detroit. He finished no better than 13th in IndyCar Series points in his four years in the series.

Also in 2007, Aguri signed Japanese driver Hideki Mutoh to run in the Indy Pro Series developmental league. Mutoh won 2 races, finished second in Pro Series points, and made his IndyCar debut at the final race of the 2007 season, finishing 8th and recording the fastest race lap.

For 2008, Mutoh took on the Panasonic and Formula Dream sponsorship and moved to Andretti Green Racing, winning Rookie of the Year honors. However, the entry was no longer branded as an ARTA project.

== Results ==
=== Japanese Grand Touring Championship (JGTC) ===
(key) (Races in bold indicate pole position) (Races in italics indicate fastest lap)

| Year | Car | Tyres | Class | No. | Drivers | 1 | 2 | 3 | 4 | 5 | 6 | 7 | 8 | 9 | Pos | Pts |
|---|---|---|---|---|---|---|---|---|---|---|---|---|---|---|---|---|
| 1998 | Nissan Skyline GT-R (R33) | B | GT500 | 50 | (Japan) Takeshi Tsuchiya (Japan) Satoshi Motoyama (Japan) Hiroki Katoh | SUZ; 13 | FUJ; C | SEN; 11 | FUJ; 6 | MOT; 6 | MIN; 9 | SUG; 8 | NC1; Ret | | 9th | 17 |
| 1999 | Nissan Skyline GT-R (R34) | B | GT500 | 2 | (Japan) Aguri Suzuki (Germany) Michael Krumm (Germany) Armin Hahne | SUZ; 5 | FUJ; 11 | SUG; 9 | MIN; 12 | FUJ; 12 | OKA; 2 | MOT; 2 | NC1; 3 | | 2nd* | 91* |
| 2000 | Honda NSX | B | GT500 | 8 | (Japan) Aguri Suzuki (Japan) Keiichi Tsuchiya | MOT; 7 | FUJ; Ret | SUG; 15 | NC1; 5 | FUJ; 1 | OKA; Ret | MIN; Ret | SUZ; DSQ | | 8th | 24 |
| 2000 | Toyota MR-S | Y | GT300 | 31 | (Japan) Morio Nitta (Japan) Yudai Igarashi (Japan) Shinichi Takagi | MOT; 6 | FUJ; 10 | SUG; 6 | NC1; 3 | FUJ; 6 | OKA; Ret | MIN; 13 | SUZ; 1 | | 6th | 39 |
| 2001 | Honda NSX | B | GT500 | 8 | (Japan) Katsutomo Kaneishi (Japan) Keiichi Tsuchiya | OKA; 2 | FUJ; 6 | SUG; 2 | NC1; 9 | FUJ; 12 | MOT; 11 | **SUZ**; 1 | MIN; Ret | | 4th | 56 |
| 2001 | Toyota MR-S | Y | GT300 | 31 | (Japan) Morio Nitta (Japan) Shinichi Takagi | **OKA**; 1 | FUJ; 3 | SUG; Ret | NC1; 3 | FUJ; 5 | MOT; Ret | SUZ; Ret | MIN; 17 | | 6th | 40 |
| 2002 | Honda NSX | B | GT500 | 8 | (Japan) Katsutomo Kaneishi (Japan) Keiichi Tsuchiya | OKA; 7 | FUJ; 4 | **SUG**; 13 | SEP; 6 | FUJ; 9 | MOT; 8 | MIN; 8 | SUZ; 2 | | 8th | 46 |
| 2002 | Toyota MR-S | BF | GT300 | 31 | (Japan) Morio Nitta (Japan) Shinichi Takagi | **OKA**; 1 | FUJ; Ret | SUG; 17 | SEP; 2 | FUJ; 4 | MOT; 5 | MIN; 4 | SUZ; 4 | | 3rd | 75 |
| 2003 | Honda NSX | B | GT500 | 8 | (Japan) Keiichi Tsuchiya (Japan) Toshihiro Kaneishi (Japan) Katsutomo Kaneishi | OKA; 11 | FUJ; Ret | SUG; 11 | FUJ; 11 | FUJ; 12 | MOT; 8 | AUT; Ret | SUZ; 6 | | 13th | 9 |
| 2003 | ASL ARTA Garaiya | BF | GT300 | 43 | (Japan) Morio Nitta (Japan) Shinichi Takagi | OKA; 19 | FUJ; 3 | SUG; 4 | FUJ; 10 | FUJ; 6 | **MOT**; 2 | AUT; 5 | SUZ; 21 | | 7th | 55 |
| 2004 | Honda NSX | B | GT500 | 8 | (Japan) Katsutomo Kaneishi (Japan) Daisuke Ito | OKA; 13 | SUG; 9 | SEP; 11 | TOK; 12 | MOT; 11 | AUT; 13 | SUZ; 11 | NC1; Ret | NC2; WD | 13th | 2 |
| 2004 | ASL ARTA Garaiya | BF | GT300 | 43 | (Japan) Morio Nitta (Japan) Shinichi Takagi | OKA; 2 | SUG; 5 | SEP; 21 | TOK; 1 | MOT; 1 | AUT; 2 | **SUZ**; 2 | **NC1**; Ret | **NC2**; 1 | 2nd | 92 |

Note: In 1999, the No. 2 ARTA was run by NISMO and scored points for NISMO in the Teams Championship

=== Complete Super GT Results ===
(key) (Races in bold indicate pole position) (Races in italics indicate fastest lap)

| Year | Car | Tyres | Class | No. | Drivers | 1 | 2 | 3 | 4 | 5 | 6 | 7 | 8 | 9 | 10 | | Pos | Points |
|---|---|---|---|---|---|---|---|---|---|---|---|---|---|---|---|---|---|---|
| 2005 | Honda NSX | B | GT500 | 8 | (Republic of Ireland) Ralph Firman (Japan) Daisuke Ito | OKA; 4 | FUJ; 12 | **SEP**; 2 | SUG; 6 | **MOT**; 16 | FUJ; 8 | **AUT**; 1 | SUZ; 12 | | | | 2nd | 82 |
| 2005 | ASL ARTA Garaiya | M | GT300 | 43 | (Japan) Morio Nitta (Japan) Shinichi Takagi | OKA; 10 | FUJ; 2 | **SEP**; 1 | SUG; 18 | MOT; 3 | FUJ; Ret | **AUT**; 2 | SUZ; 8 | | | | 3rd | 74 |
| 2006 | Honda NSX | B | GT500 | 8 | (Republic of Ireland) Ralph Firman (Japan) Daisuke Ito (Japan) Toshihiro Kaneishi | **SUZ**; 3 | OKA; 7 | FUJ; 8 | **SEP**; 1 | SUG; 8 | SUZ; 6 | MOT; 15 | AUT; 11 | FUJ; 14 | | | 9th | 48 |
| 2007 | Honda NSX | B | GT500 | 8 | (Republic of Ireland) Ralph Firman (Japan) Daisuke Ito (Japan) Yuji Ide | **SUZ**; 12 | OKA; 1 | FUJ; 9 | SEP; 6 | SUG; 1 | SUZ; 2 | MOT; 12 | AUT; 1 | FUJ; 8 | | | 1st | 108 |
| 2007 | ASL ARTA Garaiya | M | GT300 | 43 | (Japan) Morio Nitta (Japan) Shinichi Takagi | SUZ; 18 | OKA; 17 | FUJ; 1 | SEP; Ret | SUG; Ret | SUZ; 2 | **MOT**; 3 | AUT; 5 | FUJ; 7 | | | 6th | 72 |
| 2008 | Honda NSX | B | GT500 | 8 | (Republic of Ireland) Ralph Firman (Japan) Takuya Izawa | SUZ; 14 | OKA; 3 | FUJ; Ret | SEP; 11 | SUG; 15 | SUZ; 13 | MOT; 2 | AUT; 3 | FUJ; 12 | | | 12th | 54 |
| 2008 | ASL ARTA Garaiya | M | GT300 | 43 | (Japan) Morio Nitta (Japan) Shinichi Takagi (Japan) Kyosuke Mineo | SUZ; 5 | **OKA**; 1 | FUJ; 7 | SEP; 12 | SUG; 1 | SUZ; Ret | MOT; 9 | AUT; 2 | FUJ; 9 | | | 2nd | 89 |
| 2009 | Honda NSX | B | GT500 | 8 | (Republic of Ireland) Ralph Firman (Japan) Takuya Izawa | OKA; 3 | SUZ; 14 | FUJ; 3 | SEP; 3 | SUG; 14 | SUZ; 12 | FUJ; 1 | AUT; 4 | **MOT**; 1 | | | 2nd | 102 |
| 2009 | ASL ARTA Garaiya | M | GT300 | 43 | (Japan) Morio Nitta (Japan) Shinichi Takagi | OKA; 2 | SUZ; 5 | **FUJ**; 1 | SEP; 10 | SUG; 9 | SUZ; 2 | FUJ; 7 | **AUT**; 4 | MOT; 14 | | | 4th | 96 |
| 2010 | Honda HSV-010 GT | B | GT500 | 8 | (Republic of Ireland) Ralph Firman (Japan) Yuji Ide (Japan) Takashi Kobayashi | SUZ; Ret | OKA; 6 | FUJ; 11 | SEP; 11 | SUG; 12 | **SUZ**; 1 | FUJ; C | MOT; 7 | NC1; 9 | NC2; 11 | | 11th | 42 |
| 2010 | ASL ARTA Garaiya | M | GT300 | 43 | (Japan) Morio Nitta (Japan) Shinichi Takagi (Japan) Kyosuke Mineo | SUZ; Ret | OKA; 6 | FUJ; 2 | SEP; 2 | SUG; 6 | SUZ; 2 | FUJ; C | MOT; 12 | **NC1**; 7 | **NC2**; 13 | | 2nd | 73 |
| 2011 | Honda HSV-010 GT | B | GT500 | 8 | (Japan) Hideki Mutoh (Japan) Takashi Kobayashi | OKA; 12 | FUJ; 9 | SEP; 9 | SUG; 10 | SUZ; 9 | FUJ; 9 | AUT; 12 | MOT; 13 | NC1; 10 | NC2; Ret | | 15th | 26 |
| 2011 | ASL ARTA Garaiya | B | GT300 | 43 | (Japan) Shinichi Takagi (Japan) Kosuke Matsuura | OKA; 20 | FUJ; 6 | SEP; 5 | **SUG**; 3 | **SUZ**; 20 | FUJ; 12 | AUT; 13 | MOT; 7 | NC1; 3 | NC2; 4 | | 10th | 46 |
| 2012 | Honda HSV-010 GT | B | GT500 | 8 | (Republic of Ireland) Ralph Firman (Japan) Takashi Kobayashi | OKA; 6 | FUJ; Ret | SEP; 12 | SUG; Ret | SUZ; 7 | FUJ; 9 | AUT; 11 | MOT; 13 | NC1; 8 | NC2; 9 | | 15th | 25 |
| 2012 | ASL ARTA Garaiya | B | GT300 | 43 | (Japan) Shinichi Takagi (Japan) Kosuke Matsuura | OKA; 6 | FUJ; 4 | SEP; 9 | SUG; 9 | SUZ; 4 | FUJ; 5 | AUT; 17 | MOT; 21 | NC1; 3 | NC2; 9 | | 8th | 51 |
| 2013 | Honda HSV-010 GT | B | GT500 | 8 | (Republic of Ireland) Ralph Firman (Japan) Kosuke Matsuura | OKA; 9 | FUJ; 8 | SEP; 8 | SUG; 1 | SUZ; 12 | FUJ; 8 | | AUT; 14 | MOT; 15 | NC1; 13 | NC2; 13 | 11th | 49 |
| 2013 | Honda CR-Z GT | B | GT300 | 55 | (Japan) Shinichi Takagi (Japan) Takashi Kobayashi (Japan) Tomoki Nojiri | OKA; 12 | FUJ; 19 | **SEP**; 1 | SUG; 1 | SUZ; Ret | **FUJ**; 16 | FUJ; Ret | AUT; 16 | MOT; 15 | NC1; 3 | NC2; 4 | 7th | 52 |
| 2014 | Honda NSX GT500 | B | GT500 | 8 | (Italy) Vitantonio Liuzzi (Japan) Kosuke Matsuura | OKA; 8 | FUJ; Ret | AUT; Ret | SUG; 15 | FUJ; 10 | SUZ; 4 | BUR; Ret | MOT; 12 | | | | 14th | 25 |
| 2014 | Honda CR-Z GT | B | GT300 | 55 | (Japan) Shinichi Takagi (Japan) Takashi Kobayashi | OKA; 6 | FUJ; 18 | AUT; 1 | SUG; 16 | **FUJ**; 22 | SUZ; 16 | **BUR**; 13 | MOT; 12 | | | | 10th | 41 |
| 2015 | Honda NSX GT500 | B | GT500 | 8 | (Japan) Kosuke Matsuura (Japan) Tomoki Nojiri | OKA; 4 | FUJ; 13 | CHA; Ret | FUJ; Ret | SUZ; 10 | SUG; 12 | AUT; 14 | MOT; 11 | | | | 14th | 19 |
| 2015 | Honda CR-Z GT | B | GT300 | 55 | (Japan) Shinichi Takagi (Japan) Takashi Kobayashi (Japan) Nirei Fukuzumi | OKA; 2 | FUJ; 17 | CHA; 10 | **FUJ**; 1 | SUZ; 12 | **SUG**; 12 | AUT; 6 | MOT; 4 | | | | 5th | 69 |
| 2016 | Honda NSX GT500 | B | GT500 | 8 | (Japan) Kosuke Matsuura (Japan) Tomoki Nojiri | OKA; Ret | FUJ; 6 | SUG; 14 | FUJ; 6 | SUZ; 9 | CHA; 8 | MOT; 11 | MOT; 13 | | | | 13th | 33 |
| 2016 | BMW M6 GT3 | B | GT300 | 55 | (Japan) Shinichi Takagi (Japan) Takashi Kobayashi | OKA; 11 | **FUJ**; 2 | SUG; Ret | **FUJ**; 1 | SUZ; 14 | CHA; 3 | MOT; Ret | MOT; DNS | | | | 8th | 59 |
| 2017 | Honda NSX GT500 | B | GT500 | 8 | (Japan) Tomoki Nojiri (Japan) Takashi Kobayashi | **OKA**; DNS | FUJ; 9 | AUT; Ret | **SUG**; 5 | **FUJ**; 1 | SUZ; 8 | CHA; 11 | MOT; 9 | | | | 9th | 50 |
| 2017 | BMW M6 GT3 | B | GT300 | 55 | (Japan) Shinichi Takagi (United Kingdom) Sean Walkinshaw | OKA; 5 | FUJ; 17 | AUT; 3 | SUG; Ret | **FUJ**; 1 | SUZ; Ret | CHA; 4 | MOT; 2 | | | | 4th | 76 |
| 2018 | Honda NSX GT500 | B | GT500 | 8 | (Japan) Tomoki Nojiri (Japan) Takuya Izawa | OKA; 11 | FUJ; 8 | **SUZ**; 1 | CHA; Ret | FUJ; 4 | SUG; 2 | **AUT**; 12 | **MOT**; 1 | | | | 3rd | 89 |
| 2018 | BMW M6 GT3 | B | GT300 | 55 | (Japan) Shinichi Takagi (United Kingdom) Sean Walkinshaw | OKA; 6 | **FUJ**; 1 | SUZ; 20 | CHA; 11 | FUJ; 1 | SUG; 10 | AUT; 4 | MOT; 9 | | | | 2nd | 85 |
| 2019 | Honda NSX GT500 | B | GT500 | 8 | (Japan) Tomoki Nojiri (Japan) Takuya Izawa | OKA; 1 | FUJ; 9 | SUZ; 4 | BUR; Ret | FUJ; 7 | AUT; 5 | SUG; 12 | MOT; 13 | NC1; 15 | NC2; 22 | | 10th | 47 |
| 2019 | Honda NSX GT3 Evo | B | GT300 | 55 | (Japan) Shinichi Takagi (Japan) Nirei Fukuzumi | **OKA**; 2 | FUJ; 2 | SUZ; 6 | BUR; 9 | FUJ; 6 | AUT; 6 | SUG; 1 | MOT; 4 | NC1 | NC2 | | 1st | 92.5 |
| 2020 | Honda NSX GT500 | B | GT500 | 8 | (Japan) Tomoki Nojiri (Japan) Nirei Fukuzumi | FUJ; 8 | FUJ; 14 | SUZ; 13 | MOT; Ret | FUJ; 3 | SUZ; 3 | MOT; 1 | FUJ; 5 | | | | 7th | 68 |
| 2020 | Honda NSX GT3 Evo | B | GT300 | 55 | (Japan) Toshiki Oyu (Japan) Shinichi Takagi (Japan) Nobuharu Matsushita | FUJ; 7 | FUJ; 3 | SUZ; 26 | MOT; 7 | FUJ; 2 | SUZ; 7 | MOT; 8 | FUJ; 7 | | | | 4th | 67 |
| 2021 | Honda NSX GT500 | B | GT500 | 8 | (Japan) Tomoki Nojiri (Japan) Nirei Fukuzumi | OKA; 7 | FUJ; 8 | MOT; 5 | SUZ; 11 | **SUG**; 10 | AUT; 1 | MOT; 1 | FUJ; 6 | | | | 2nd | 81 |
| 2021 | Honda NSX GT3 Evo | B | GT300 | 55 | (Japan) Shinichi Takagi (Japan) Ren Sato | OKA; 26 | FUJ; 3 | MOT; 23 | SUZ; 7 | SUG; 2 | AUT; 20 | MOT; 2 | FUJ; 24 | | | | 5th | 64 |
| 2022 | Honda NSX GT500 | B | GT500 | 8 | (Japan) Tomoki Nojiri (Japan) Nirei Fukuzumi | OKA; 10 | FUJ; 1 | SUZ; 7 | FUJ; 5 | SUZ; 13 | SUG; 13 | AUT; 11 | MOT; 8 | | | | 12th | 42.5 |
| 2022 | Honda NSX GT3 Evo | B | GT300 | 55 | (Japan) Hideki Mutoh (Japan) Iori Kimura | OKA; 15 | FUJ; Ret | SUZ; 10 | FUJ; Ret | SUZ; 24 | SUG; 7 | AUT; 18 | **MOT**; 1 | | | | 13th | 41 |
| 2023 | Honda NSX GT500 | B | GT500 | 8 | (Japan) Tomoki Nojiri (Japan) Toshiki Oyu (Japan) Iori Kimura | OKA; 3 | FUJ; 11 | SUZ; 12 | FUJ; 14 | SUZ; 14 | **SUG**; 1 | AUT; Ret | MOT; 5 | | | | 9th | 54 |
| 2023 | Honda NSX GT500 | B | GT500 | 16 | (Japan) Nirei Fukuzumi (Japan) Hiroki Otsu | OKA; 11 | FUJ; 10 | SUZ; 7 | FUJ; 3 | **SUZ**; 1 | SUG; 12 | **AUT**; 2 | MOT; 12 | | | | 4th | 73 |
| 2024 | Honda Civic Type R-GT | B | GT500 | 8 | (Japan) Tomoki Nojiri (Japan) Nobuharu Matsushita | OKA; 8 | FUJ; 14 | SUZ; Ret | FUJ; 1 | SUG; 15 | AUT; 11 | MOT; 2 | SUZ; 12 | | | | 9th | 55 |
| 2024 | Honda Civic Type R-GT | B | GT500 | 16 | (Japan) Hiroki Otsu (Japan) Ren Sato | OKA; 9 | FUJ; 15 | SUZ; 3 | FUJ; 11 | SUG; 10 | AUT; 6 | MOT; 4 | SUZ; 5 | | | | 10th | 54 |
| 2025 | Honda Civic Type R-GT | B | GT500 | 8 | (Japan) Tomoki Nojiri (Japan) Nobuharu Matsushita | OKA; 7 | FUJ; 9 | SEP; 2 | FS1; 10 | FS2; 11 | SUZ; 11 | SUG; 8 | AUT; 10 | MOT; 6 | | | 8th | 54.5 |
| 2025 | Honda Civic Type R-GT | B | GT500 | 16 | (Japan) Hiroki Otsu (Japan) Ren Sato | OKA; Ret | FUJ; 11 | SEP; 12 | FS1; 13 | FS2; 14 | **SUZ**; 4 | **SUG**; 4 | AUT; 3 | MOT; 8 | | | 9th | 50.5 |
| 2026 | Honda HRC Prelude-GT | B | GT500 | 8 | (Japan) Kakunoshin Ohta (Japan) Hiroki Otsu | OKA; 11 | FUJ; 11 | **FUJ**; 2 | SUZ; 3 | SUG; 9 | AUT; 6 | MOT; 3 | MOT; 7 | | | | 6th | 70 |
| 2026 | Honda HRC Prelude-GT | B | GT500 | 16 | (Japan) Tomoki Nojiri (Japan) Ren Sato | OKA; 6 | FUJ; 5 | FUJ; 9 | SUZ; 1 | SUG; Ret | AUT; 9 | MOT; 8 | MOT; 6 | | | | 7th | 64 |

Note: Non-championship (NC1, NC2) races are major races that do not count towards the championship.

=== Complete Japanese Top Formula racing results ===
(key) (Races in bold indicate pole position) (Races in italics indicate fastest lap)

| Year | Chassis | Engine | Tyres | No. | Drivers | 1 | 2 | 3 | 4 | 5 | 6 | 7 | 8 | 9 | 10 | 11 | D.C. | Pts | T.C. | Pts |
Formula Nippon
| 1996 | Reynard 95D | Mugen MF308 | B | 55 | (Japan) Katsutomo Kaneishi | SUZ; 6 | MIN; Ret | FUJ; 4 | TOK; 5 | SUZ; 7 | SUG; Ret | FUJ; 4 | MIN; Ret | SUZ; Ret | FUJ; 1 | | 7th | 19 | 5th | 35 |
| 1996 | Reynard 95D | Mugen MF308 | B | 56 | (Japan) Satoshi Motoyama | SUZ; 7 | MIN; Ret | FUJ; 5 | TOK; 17 | SUZ; 12 | SUG; 3 | FUJ; 5 | MIN; 6 | SUZ; Ret | FUJ; DNS | | 10th | 9 | 5th | 35 |
| 1997 | Reynard 97D; Reynard 96D; Reynard 95D; Reynard 94D | Mugen MF308 | B | 55 | (Japan) Katsutomo Kaneishi | SUZ; 7 | MIN; Ret | FUJ; Ret | SUZ; 10 | SUG; Ret | FUJ; 18 | MIN; 8 | MOT; Ret | **FUJ**; 1 | SUZ; Ret | | 9th | 10 | 7th | 17 |
| 1997 | Reynard 97D; Reynard 96D; Reynard 95D; Reynard 94D | Mugen MF308 | B | 56 | (Japan) Satoshi Motoyama | SUZ; 4 | MIN; DNS | FUJ; Ret | SUZ; Ret | SUG; Ret | FUJ; Ret | MIN; 6 | MOT; Ret | FUJ; 4 | | | 11th | 7 | 7th | 17 |
| 1997 | Reynard 97D; Reynard 96D; Reynard 95D; Reynard 94D | Mugen MF308 | B | 56 | (Japan) Ryō Michigami | | | | | | | | | | SUZ; Ret | | 37th | 0 | 7th | 17 |
| 1998 | Lola T98/51; Lola T97/51 | Mugen MF308 | B | 55 | (Japan) Katsutomo Kaneishi | SUZ; 4 | MIN; 5 | FUJ; 2 | MOT; Ret | SUZ; Ret | SUG; 7 | FUJ; C | MIN; 5 | FUJ; 10 | SUZ; Ret | | 7th | 13 | 3rd | 38 |
| 1998 | Lola T98/51; Lola T97/51 | Mugen MF308 | B | 56 | (Japan) Juichi Wakisaka | SUZ; Ret | **MIN**; 2 | FUJ; Ret | MOT; 1 | SUZ; 4 | SUG; Ret | FUJ; C | MIN; Ret | FUJ; Ret | SUZ; 2 | | 3rd | 25 | 3rd | 38 |
| 1999 | Lola B99/51; Reynard 99L | Mugen MF308 | B | 55 | (Japan) Katsutomo Kaneishi | SUZ; 9 | MOT; Ret | MIN; Ret | FUJ; 11 | SUZ; Ret | SUG; 8 | FUJ; 6 | MIN; Ret | MOT; Ret | SUZ; 7 | | 16th | 1 | 6th | 17 |
| 1999 | Lola B99/51; Reynard 99L | Mugen MF308 | B | 56 | (Japan) Juichi Wakisaka | SUZ; Ret | MOT; 15 | MIN; 10 | FUJ; Ret | SUZ; 9 | SUG; 5 | FUJ; 2 | MIN; 3 | MOT; 11 | SUZ; 3 | | 8th | 16 | 6th | 17 |
| 2000 | Reynard 99L | Mugen MF308 | B | 55 | (Japan) Katsutomo Kaneishi | SUZ; 4 | MOT; 6 | MIN; 5 | FUJ; 3 | SUZ; Ret | SUG; 3 | MOT; 11 | FUJ; Ret | MIN | SUZ | | 6th | 14 | 4th | 27 |
| 2000 | Reynard 99L | Mugen MF308 | B | 56 | (Japan) Juichi Wakisaka | SUZ; 11 | MOT; 5 | MIN; 4 | FUJ; 2 | SUZ; 8 | SUG; Ret | MOT; Ret | FUJ; Ret | MIN; 6 | SUZ; 6 | | 7th | 13 | 4th | 27 |
| 2001 | Reynard 99L | Mugen MF308 | B | 55 | (Japan) Juichi Wakisaka | SUZ; 2 | MOT; 10 | MIN; 12 | FUJ; Ret | SUZ; 6 | **SUG**; 2 | **FUJ**; 1 | **MIN**; DSQ | MOT; Ret | SUZ; Ret | | 5th | 23 | 3rd | 40 |
| 2001 | Reynard 99L | Mugen MF308 | B | 56 | (Japan) Takeshi Tsuchiya | SUZ; 10 | MOT; Ret | MIN; 3 | FUJ; Ret | SUZ; 3 | SUG; Ret | FUJ; 14 | MIN; 2 | MOT; 6 | SUZ; 5 | | 8th | 17 | 3rd | 40 |
| 2002 | Reynard 01L; Reynard 99L | Mugen MF308 | B | 55 | (Japan) Juichi Wakisaka | SUZ; 5 | FUJ; 3 | MIN; Ret | SUZ; 3 | **MOT**; 3 | SUG; Ret | FUJ; 1 | MIN; 8 | **MOT**; 2 | **SUZ**; 4 | | 3rd | 33 | 3rd | 44 |
| 2002 | Reynard 01L; Reynard 99L | Mugen MF308 | B | 56 | (Japan) Toshihiro Kaneishi | SUZ; Ret | FUJ; Ret | MIN; 4 | SUZ; 6 | MOT; 5 | SUG; 6 | FUJ; 5 | MIN; 5 | MOT; Ret | SUZ; 7 | | 7th | 11 | 3rd | 44 |
| 2003 | Lola B03/51 | Mugen MF308 | B | 7 | (Japan) Toshihiro Kaneishi | SUZ; 3 | FUJ; 8 | MIN; 5 | MOT; 7 | SUZ; Ret | SUG; 8 | FUJ; Ret | MIN; 2 | **MOT**; 1 | SUZ; Ret | | 4th | 22 | 2nd | 38 |
| 2003 | Lola B03/51 | Mugen MF308 | B | 8 | (Japan) Takeshi Tsuchiya | SUZ; Ret | FUJ; NC | MIN; 2 | MOT; 4 | SUZ; 5 | SUG; 7 | FUJ; 6 | MIN; 12 | MOT; 6 | SUZ; 4 | | 8th | 16 | 2nd | 38 |
| 2006 | Lola FN06 | Honda HF386E | B | 55 | (Japan) Toshihiro Kaneishi | FUJ; 16 | SUZ; Ret | MOT; Ret | SUZ; Ret | AUT; 2 | FUJ; 4 | SUG; Ret | MOT; Ret | SUZ; 7 | | | 9th | 9th | 7th | 12 |
| 2006 | Lola FN06 | Honda HF386E | B | 56 | (Japan) Takashi Kogure | FUJ; 10 | SUZ; 17 | **MOT**; Ret | SUZ; 9 | **AUT**; 19 | **FUJ**; Ret | **SUG**; DSQ | **MOT**; Ret | SUZ; 4 | | | 12th | 3 | 7th | 12 |
| 2007 | Lola FN06 | Honda HF386E | B | 55 | (Japan) Yuji Ide | FUJ; 14 | SUZ; 10 | MOT; 16 | OKA; Ret | SUZ; 3 | FUJ; 16 | SUG; Ret | MOT; Ret | SUZ; 10 | | | 13th | 6 | 10th | 6 |
| 2007 | Lola FN06 | Honda HF386E | B | 56 | (Japan) Toshihiro Kaneishi | FUJ; 12 | SUZ; 17 | MOT; 10 | OKA; Ret | SUZ; 9 | FUJ; 11 | SUG; Ret | MOT; 14 | SUZ; Ret | | | 18th | 0 | 10th | 6 |
| 2008 | Lola FN06 | Honda HF386E | B | 55 | (Japan) Yuji Ide | FUJ; 9 | SUZ; 18 | MOT; 15 | OKA; NC | SUZ; 15 | SUZ; Ret | MOT; 12 | MOT; Ret | FUJ; NC | FUJ; 19 | SUG; 17 | 19th | 2 | 8th | 21 |
| 2008 | Lola FN06 | Honda HF386E | B | 56 | (Japan) Takuya Izawa | FUJ; Ret | SUZ; 9 | MOT; 4 | OKA; 5 | SUZ; 12 | SUZ; Ret | MOT; Ret | MOT; 12 | FUJ; 18 | FUJ; 17 | SUG; 8 | 10th | 19 | 8th | 21 |

=== Complete Indycar series results ===
| Year | Chassis | Engine | Tyres | Drivers | No. | 1 | 2 | 3 | 4 | 5 | 6 | 7 | 8 | 9 | 10 | 11 | 12 | 13 | 14 | 15 | 16 | 17 | Pts Pos | Pts |
As "Super Aguri Fernandez Racing"
| 2003 | | | | | | HMS | PHX | MOT | INDY | TXS | PPIR | RIR | KAN | NSH | MCH | GAT | KTY | NAZ | CHI | FON | TXS | | | |
| 2003 | Dallara IR-03 | Honda HI3R V8 | F | (United States) Roger Yasukawa | 55 | 14 | 17 | 21 | 10 | 9 | 17 | 11 | 7 | 15 | 8 | 18 | 12 | 8 | 8 | 7 | 10 | | 12th | **301** |
| 2004 | | | | | | HMS | PHX | MOT | INDY | TXS | RIR | KAN | NSH | MIL | MCH | KTY | PPIR | NAZ | CHI | FON | TXS | | | |
| 2004 | G-Force GF09B | Honda HI4R V8 | F | (Mexico) Adrián Fernández | 5 | | 20 | 18 | 7 | 5 | 7 | 6 | 10 | 8 | 12 | 1 | 2 | 7 | 1 | 1 | 5 | | 5th | **445** |
| 2004 | G-Force GF09B | Honda HI4R V8 | F | (Japan) Kosuke Matsuura | 55 | 11 | 11 | 8 | 11 | 16 | 14 | 18 | 9 | 10 | 17 | 4 | 13 | 21 | 21 | 13 | 19 | | 14th | **280** |
| 2005 | | | | | | HMS | PHX | STP | MOT | INDY | TXS | RIR | KAN | NSH | MIL | MCH | KTY | PPIR | SNM | CHI | WGL | FON | | |
| 2005 | Panoz GF09C | Honda HI5R V8 | F | (Japan) Kosuke Matsuura | 55 | 12 | 10 | 13 | 9 | 17 | 7 | 9 | 20 | 14 | 11 | 16 | 8 | 13 | 6 | 23 | 6 | 19 | 14th | **320** |
| 2006 | | | | | | HMS | STP | MOT | INDY | WGL | TXS | RIR | KAN | NSH | MIL | MCH | KTY | SNM | CHI | | | | | |
| 2006 | Dallara IR-05; Panoz GF09C | Honda HI6R V8 | F | (Japan) Kosuke Matsuura | 55 | 6 | 7 | 7 | 15 | 18 | 8 | 12 | 8 | 13 | 17 | 9 | 19 | 13 | 11 | | | | 13th | **273** |
As "Aguri Panther Racing"
| 2007 | | | | | | HMS | STP | MOT | KAN | INDY | MIL | TXS | IOW | RIR | WGL | NSH | MDO | MCH | KTY | SNM | DET | CHI | | |
| 2007 | Dallara IR-05 | Honda HI7R V8 | F | (Japan) Kosuke Matsuura | 55 | 16 | 17 | 18 | 18 | 16 | 11 | 9 | 15 | 17 | 8 | 16 | 12 | 4 | 11 | 10 | 5 | 17 | 16th | **303** |
| 2007 | Dallara IR-05 | Honda HI7R V8 | F | (Japan) Hideki Mutoh | 60 | | | | | | | | | | | | | | | | | 8 | 25th | 24 |

== See also ==
- Super Aguri F1
- Team Aguri
