= 1996 Macau Grand Prix =

Formula Three motor race

Race details
Date	17 November 1996
Location	Guia Circuit, Macau
Course	Temporary street circuit 6.120 km (3.803 mi)
Distance	Leg 1; 15 laps, 73.44 km (45.63 mi); Leg 2; 15 laps, 73.44 km (45.63 mi)
- Leg 1

Pole
Driver	(Germany) Nick Heidfeld	Bertram Schafer Racing
Time	2:19.082

Fastest Lap
Driver	(Republic of Ireland) Ralph Firman	Paul Stewart Racing
Time	2:18.612

Podium
First	(Germany) Nick Heidfeld	Bertram Schafer Racing
Second	(Italy) Jarno Trulli	Paul Stewart Racing
Third	(Italy) Massimiliano Angelelli	Bertram Schafer Racing
- Leg 2
Driver	(Germany) Nick Heidfeld	Bertram Schafer Racing

Fastest Lap
Driver	(Netherlands) Tom Coronel	TOM'S
Time	2:18.612

Podium
First	(Republic of Ireland) Ralph Firman	Paul Stewart Racing
Second	(Italy) Massimiliano Angelelli	Bertram Schafer Racing
Third	(Italy) Jarno Trulli	KMS

The 1996 Macau Grand Prix Formula Three was the 43rd Macau Grand Prix race to be held on the streets of Macau on 17 November 1996. It was the thirteenth edition for Formula Three cars.

== Entry list ==
Team	No	Driver	Vehicle	Engine
(Switzerland) Mild Seven Benetton KMS	1	(Italy) Jarno Trulli	Dallara 396	Opel
(Switzerland) Mild Seven Benetton KMS	2	(Portugal) Rui Águas	Dallara 396	Opel
(France) Graff Racing	3	(France) Soheil Ayari	Dallara 396	Opel
(Japan) TOM'S	5	(Netherlands) Tom Coronel	TOM'S 036	Toyota
(Japan) TOM'S	6	(Japan) Takashi Yokoyama	TOM'S 036	Toyota
(United Kingdom) TOM'S GB	31	(Argentina) Brian Smith	TOM'S 036	Toyota
(United Kingdom) TOM'S GB	32	(United Kingdom) Guy Smith	TOM'S 036	Toyota
(Italy) RC Motorsport	7	(Italy) Andrea Boldrini	Dallara 395	Opel
(United Kingdom) San Miguel Paul Stewart Racing	8	(Republic of Ireland) Ralph Firman	Dallara 395	Mugen-Honda
(United Kingdom) San Miguel Paul Stewart Racing	9	(Spain) Pedro de la Rosa	Dallara 395	Mugen-Honda
(Germany) Bertram Schafer Racing	10	(Italy) Massimiliano Angelelli	Dallara 396	Opel
(Germany) Bertram Schafer Racing	11	(Germany) Arnd Meier	Dallara 395	Opel
(Germany) Bertram Schafer Racing	12	(Germany) Nick Heidfeld	Dallara 395	Opel
(Italy) EF Project	15	(Italy) Michele Gasparini	Dallara 395	Fiat
(United Kingdom) Alan Docking Racing	17	(Belgium) Kurt Mollekens	Dallara 396	Mugen-Honda
(United Kingdom) Alan Docking Racing	18	(United States) Brian Cunningham	Dallara 396	Mugen-Honda
(Italy) Prema Powerteam	19	(Portugal) André Couto	Dallara 396	Fiat
(Italy) Prema Powerteam	21	(France) Sebastien Boulet	Dallara 395	Fiat
(United Kingdom) Fortec Motorsports	22	(Colombia) Juan Pablo Montoya	Dallara 396	Mitsubishi
(United Kingdom) Fortec Motorsports	23	(United Kingdom) Jamie Davies	Dallara 396	Mitsubishi
(Germany) GM Motorsport	25	(United Kingdom) Jonny Kane	Dallara 396	Opel
(Germany) GM Motorsport	26	(Germany) Steffen Widmann	Dallara 395	Opel
(France) La Filiere	28	(France) Guillaume Greuet	Dallara 396	Fiat
(France) Racing for Europe	29	(Italy) Davide Campana	Dallara 396	Opel
(Japan) Tomei Sport Opel	30	(Japan) Keiichi Nishimiya	Dallara 396	Opel
(United Kingdom) Speedsport F3 Racing Team	33	(United Kingdom) Darren Manning	Dallara 396	Mugen-Honda
(Italy) Parma Motorsport	35	(Belgium) Tim Verbergt	Dallara 395	Fiat
(Japan) Nakajima Honda	64	(Japan) Koji Yamanishi	Dallara 396	Mugen-Honda

== Qualifying ==
Pos	Driver	Team	Laps
1	(Germany) Nick Heidfeld	(Germany) Bertram Schafer Racing	2.19.082
2	(Italy) Jarno Trulli	(Switzerland) Mild Seven Benetton KMS	2.19.166
3	(France) Soheil Ayari	(France) Graff Racing	2.19.201
4	(United Kingdom) Ralph Firman	(United Kingdom) Paul Stewart Racing	2.19.246
5	(United Kingdom) Jamie Davies	(United Kingdom) Fortec Motorsports	2.19.558
6	(Italy) Max Angelelli	(Germany) Bertram Schäfer Racing	2.19.687
7	(Colombia) Juan Pablo Montoya	(United Kingdom) Fortec Motorsports	2.20.050
8	(Spain) Pedro de la Rosa	(United Kingdom) Paul Stewart Racing	2.20.195
9	(Netherlands) Tom Coronel	(Japan) TOM'S Racing	2.20.203
10	(Italy) Michele Gasparini	(Italy) EF Project	2.20.272
11	(United Kingdom) Darren Manning	(United Kingdom) Speedsport F3 Racing Team	2.20.322
12	(Belgium) Kurt Mollekens	(United Kingdom) Alan Docking Racing	2.20.647
13	(Portugal) Rui Águas	(Switzerland) Mild Seven Benetton KMS	2.20.855
14	(Japan) Keiichi Nishimiya	(Japan) Tomei Sport	2.21.016
15	(Portugal) André Couto	(Italy) Prema Powerteam	2.21.035
16	(United States) Brian Cunningham	(United Kingdom) Alan Docking Racing	2.21.178
17	(Germany) Arnd Meier	(Germany) Bertram Schäfer Racing	2.21.207
18	(United Kingdom) Jonny Kane	(Germany) GM Motorsport	2.21.380
19	(Italy) Andrea Boldrini	(Italy) RC Motorsport	2.21.400
20	(Argentina) Brian Smith	(Japan) TOM'S Racing	2.21.812
21	(United Kingdom) Guy Smith	(Japan) TOM'S Racing	2.21.888
22	(France) Guillaume Greuet	(France) Elf La Filière	2.22.339
23	(France) Sébastien Boulet	(Italy) Prema Powerteam	2.22.613
24	(Germany) Steffen Widmann	(Italy) GM Motorsport	2.22.768
25	(Italy) Davide Campana	(France) Racing for Europe	2.22.899
26	(Japan) Koji Yamanishi	(Japan) Nakajima Racing	2.23.176
27	(Japan) Takashi Yokoyama	(Japan) TOM'S Racing	2.23.301
28	(Belgium) Tim Verbergt	(Italy) Parma Motorsport	2.30.288

== Main Race Results ==
Pos	Driver	Team	Laps
1	(Republic of Ireland) Ralph Firman	(United Kingdom) Paul Stewart Racing	27
2	(Italy) Max Angelelli	(Germany) Bertram Schäfer Racing	27
3	(Italy) Jarno Trulli	(Switzerland) Mild Seven Benetton KMS	27
4	(France) Soheil Ayari	(France) Graff Racing	27
5	(Netherlands) Tom Coronel	(Japan) TOM'S Racing	27
6	(Germany) Nick Heidfeld	(Germany) Bertram Schafer Racing	27
7	(Spain) Pedro de la Rosa	(United Kingdom) Paul Stewart Racing	27
8	(Portugal) André Couto	(Italy) Prema Powerteam	27
9	(United Kingdom) Darren Manning	(United Kingdom) Speedsport F3 Racing Team	27
10	(United Kingdom) Guy Smith	(Japan) TOM'S Racing	27
11	(Italy) Michele Gasparini	(Italy) EF Project	27
12	(United Kingdom) Jamie Davies	(United Kingdom) Fortec Motorsports	27
13	(France) Guillaume Greuet	(France) Elf La Filière	27
14	(Germany) Steffen Widmann	(Italy) GM Motorsport	27
15	(United Kingdom) Jonny Kane	(Germany) GM Motorsport	27
16	(Japan) Koji Yamanishi	(Japan) Nakajima Racing	27
17	(Japan) Keiichi Nishimiya	(Japan) Tomei Sport	27
DNF	(Argentina) Brian Smith	(Japan) TOM'S Racing	25
DNF	(France) Sébastien Boulet	(Italy) Prema Powerteam	24
DNF	(Colombia) Juan Pablo Montoya	(United Kingdom) Fortec Motorsports	21
DNF	(Portugal) Rui Águas	(Switzerland) Mild Seven Benetton KMS	17
DNF	(Germany) Arnd Meier	(Germany) Bertram Schäfer Racing	15
DNF	(United States) Brian Cunningham	(United Kingdom) Alan Docking Racing	15
DNF	(Japan) Takashi Yokoyama	(Japan) TOM'S Racing	15
DNF	(Belgium) Tim Verbergt	(Italy) Parma Motorsport	14
DNF	(Belgium) Kurt Mollekens	(United Kingdom) Alan Docking Racing	12
DNF	(Italy) Davide Campana	(France) Racing for Europe	12
DNF	(Italy) Andrea Boldrini	(Italy) RC Motorsport	12
