= 2002 Formula Nippon Championship =

The 2002 Formula Nippon Championship was the thirtieth season of premier Japanese single-seater racing, and the seventh under the Formula Nippon moniker. The series was contested over 10 rounds at five venues. 11 different teams and 22 different drivers completed in the series.

Reynard became the sole supplier of chassis to all teams after the withdrawal of G-Force Technologies, but this would only last one season after the company declared bankruptcy in February 2002.

Nakajima Racing driver Ralph Firman won the series championship before moving to Formula One in 2003.

== Teams and drivers ==
All teams used tyres supplied by Bridgestone and Mugen MF308 engines.

Team	#	Driver	Chassis	Rounds
Xbox Team Impul	1	(Japan) Satoshi Motoyama	Reynard 01L	All
Xbox Team Impul	2	(Germany) Michael Krumm	Reynard 99L	1–2
Olympic Kondo Racing Team	3	(Japan) Seiji Ara	Reynard 99L	All
Olympic Kondo Racing Team	4	(Japan) Katsutomo Kaneishi	Reynard 99L; Reynard 2KL	All
Team 5ZIGEN	5	(Japan) Naoki Hattori	Reynard 01L	All
Team 5ZIGEN	6	(Japan) Ryō Michigami	Reynard 01L	1–2, 5–10
Team 5ZIGEN	6	(Japan) Hidetoshi Mitsusada	Reynard 01L	3–4
Team LeMans	7	(Japan) Masami Kageyama	Reynard 99L; Reynard 01L	1–2
Team LeMans	7	(Germany) Dominik Schwager	Reynard 99L; Reynard 01L	3–10
Team LeMans	8	(Japan) Takeshi Tsuchiya	Reynard 01L	All
Soft On Demand Team Nova; Forward Team Nova	9	(Japan) Kiyoto Yamamoto	Reynard 99L	All
Soft On Demand Team Nova; Forward Team Nova	10	(Japan) Haruki Kurosawa	Reynard 99L	All
Cosmo Oil Racing Team Cerumo	11	(France) Benoît Tréluyer	Reynard 99L; Reynard 01L	1–5
Cosmo Oil Racing Team Cerumo	11	(Japan) Yuji Tachikawa	Reynard 99L; Reynard 01L	6–10
Mooncraft	14	(Japan) Yudai Igarashi	Reynard 01L	All
Team 22	22	(Japan) Daisuke Itō	Reynard 99L	All
PIAA Nakajima Racing	31	(Republic of Ireland) Ralph Firman Jr.	Reynard 01L	All
PIAA Nakajima Racing	32	(Japan) Tsugio Matsuda	Reynard 01L	All
Autobacs Racing Team Aguri	55	(Japan) Juichi Wakisaka	Reynard 99L; Reynard 01L	All
Autobacs Racing Team Aguri	56	(Japan) Toshihiro Kaneishi	Reynard 01L	All
DoCoMo Team Dandelion Racing	68	(France) Jonathan Cochet	Reynard 2KL	1–2
DoCoMo Team Dandelion Racing	68	(United Kingdom) Richard Lyons	Reynard 2KL	3–10

== Race calendar and results ==
All races were held in Japan.

Race	Track	Date	Pole position	Fastest race lap	Winning driver	Winning team
1	Suzuka Circuit	24 March	(Republic of Ireland) Ralph Firman Jr.	(Republic of Ireland) Ralph Firman Jr.	(Republic of Ireland) Ralph Firman Jr.	PIAA Nakajima Racing
2	Fuji Speedway	7 April	(Japan) Satoshi Motoyama	(Japan) Naoki Hattori	(Japan) Satoshi Motoyama	Xbox Team Impul
3	Mine Circuit	19 May	(Republic of Ireland) Ralph Firman Jr.	(Japan) Satoshi Motoyama	(Japan) Satoshi Motoyama	Xbox Team Impul
4	Suzuka-East Circuit	7 July	(Japan) Takeshi Tsuchiya	(Japan) Hidetoshi Mitsusada	(Republic of Ireland) Ralph Firman Jr.	PIAA Nakajima Racing
5	Twin Ring Motegi	21 July	(Japan) Juichi Wakisaka	(Japan) Satoshi Motoyama	(Japan) Satoshi Motoyama	Xbox Team Impul
6	Sportsland SUGO	4 August	(Japan) Takeshi Tsuchiya	(Japan) Naoki Hattori	(Republic of Ireland) Ralph Firman Jr.	PIAA Nakajima Racing
7	Fuji Speedway	1 September	(Japan) Takeshi Tsuchiya	(Japan) Ryō Michigami	(Japan) Juichi Wakisaka	Autobacs Racing Team Aguri
8	Mine Circuit	22 September	(Japan) Takeshi Tsuchiya	(Japan) Satoshi Motoyama	(Japan) Satoshi Motoyama	Xbox Team Impul
9	Twin Ring Motegi	20 October	(Japan) Juichi Wakisaka	(Japan) Juichi Wakisaka	(Republic of Ireland) Ralph Firman Jr.	PIAA Nakajima Racing
10	Suzuka Circuit	3 November	(Japan) Juichi Wakisaka	(Japan) Ryō Michigami	(Japan) Satoshi Motoyama	Xbox Team Impul

== Championship standings ==
=== Drivers' Championship ===
Scoring system

Position	1st	2nd	3rd	4th	5th	6th
Points	10	6	4	3	2	1

Rank	Name	SUZ	FUJ	MIN	SUZ	MOT	SGO	FUJ	MIN	MOT	SUZ	Points
1	(Republic of Ireland) Ralph Firman Jr.	1	2	Ret	1	9	1	2	2	1	3	62
2	(Japan) Satoshi Motoyama	Ret	1	1	5	1	Ret	3	1	3	1	60
3	(Japan) Juichi Wakisaka	5	3	Ret	3	3	Ret	1	8	2	4	33
4	(Japan) Takeshi Tsuchiya	2	6	3	Ret	2	4	Ret	7	6	2	27
5	(Japan) Tsugio Matsuda	3	10	2	Ret	Ret	5	Ret	4	4	6	19
6	(Japan) Ryō Michigami	4	DNS			4	3	4	3	12	11	17
7	(Japan) Toshihiro Kaneishi	Ret	Ret	4	6	5	6	5	5	Ret	7	11
8	(Japan) Naoki Hattori	6	Ret	Ret	4	6	12	6	6	8	5	9
9	(Japan) Hidetoshi Mitsusada			5	2							8
10	(United Kingdom) Richard Lyons			7	8	11	2	7	Ret	7	Ret	6
11	(Japan) Seiji Ara	8	4	9	10	Ret	Ret	NC	9	11	10	3
12	(Japan) Haruki Kurosawa	9	5	Ret	Ret	12	10	12	Ret	Ret	12	2
13	(Germany) Dominik Schwager			Ret	11	Ret	8	9	10	5	Ret	2
14	(France) Benoît Tréluyer	11	Ret	6	7	7						1
15	(Germany) Michael Krumm	7	7									0
16	(Japan) Yudai Igarashi	Ret	Ret	11	13	10	7	Ret	Ret	13	Ret	0
17	(Japan) Daisuke Itō	10	9	10	9	8	9	8	11	10	8	0
18	(Japan) Katsutomo Kaneishi	12	Ret	8	12	Ret	11	10	12	14	9	0
19	(France) Jonathan Cochet	13	8									0
20	(Japan) Yuji Tachikawa						Ret	11	Ret	9	Ret	0
21	(Japan) Kiyoto Yamamoto	15	11	12	Ret	Ret	Ret	13	DNS	15	13	0
22	(Japan) Masami Kageyama	Ret	Ret									0

=== Teams' Championship ===
Rank	Team	Car	SUZ	FUJ	MIN	SUZ	MOT	SGO	FUJ	MIN	MOT	SUZ	Points
1	PIAA Nakajima	31	1	2	Ret	1	9	1	2	2	1	3	81
1	PIAA Nakajima	32	3	10	2	Ret	Ret	5	Ret	4	4	6	81
2	Xbox Impul	1	Ret	1	1	5	1	Ret	3	1	3	1	60
2	Xbox Impul	2	7	7									60
3	ARTA	55	5	3	Ret	3	3	Ret	1	8	2	4	44
3	ARTA	56	Ret	Ret	4	6	5	6	5	5	Ret	7	44
4	5ZIGEN	5	6	Ret	Ret	4	6	12	6	6	8	5	34
4	5ZIGEN	6	4	DNS	5	2	4	3	4	3	12	11	34
5	LeMans	7	Ret	Ret	Ret	11	Ret	8	9	10	5	Ret	29
5	LeMans	8	2	6	3	Ret	2	4	Ret	7	6	2	29
6	DoCoMo Dandelion	68	13	8	7	8	11	2	7	Ret	7	Ret	6
7	Olympic Kondo	3	8	4	9	10	Ret	Ret	NC	9	11	10	3
7	Olympic Kondo	4	12	Ret	8	12	Ret	11	10	12	14	9	3
8	Nova	9	15	11	12	Ret	Ret	Ret	13	DNS	15	13	2
8	Nova	10	9	5	Ret	Ret	12	10	12	Ret	Ret	12	2
9	Cosmo Oil Cerumo	11	11	Ret	6	7	7	Ret	11	Ret	9	Ret	1
10	Mooncraft	14	Ret	Ret	11	13	10	7	Ret	Ret	13	Ret	0
11	Team 22	22	10	9	10	9	8	9	8	11	10	8	0
