= Daisuke Itō (racing driver) =

Japanese racing driver

- Itō in 2007
- Nationality: Japanese
- Born: 5 November 1975 (age 51) Mie, Japan

Super GT career
- Debut season: 1999 (GT300), 2000 (GT500)
- Categorisation: FIA Gold
- Former teams: Hitotsuyama Racing (GT300), Nakajima Racing, Team Kunimitsu, Dome Project, Mugen, Autobacs Racing Team Aguri, Lexus Team LeMans ENEOS, Lexus Team TOM'S
- Starts: 84
- Wins: 10
- Best finish: 1st in 2007

Previous series
- 2002 1997–99: Formula Nippon; All-Japan Formula Three

Daisuke Itō (伊藤 大輔, Itō Daisuke; born 5 November 1975 in Mie) is a Japanese racing driver. Itō won the 2007 Super GT Series in the GT500 class, sharing a Honda NSX with Ralph Firman.

== 24 Hours of Le Mans results ==
Year	Team	Co-Drivers	Car	Class	Laps	Pos.	Class Pos.
2008	(Japan) Dome Racing Team	(Japan) Tatsuya Kataoka (Japan) Yuji Tachikawa	Dome S102-Judd	LMP1	272	33rd	13th

== Racing record ==
=== Complete Japanese Formula 3 results ===
(key) (Races in bold indicate pole position) (Races in italics indicate fastest lap)

Year	Team	Engine	1	2	3	4	5	6	7	8	9	10	DC	Pts
1996	Smsc	Toyota	SUZ; Ret	TSU	MIN	FUJ	SUZ	SUG	SEN	SUZ	FUJ		NC	0
1997	Skill Speed	Mugen	SUZ; Ret	TSU; Ret	MIN; 8	FUJ; 4	SUZ; 14	**SUG**; 7	SEN; 7	MOT; 6	FUJ; C	**SUZ**; 1	6th	11
1998	Skill Speed	Mugen	SUZ; 2	TSU; 4	MIN; 7	FUJ; 3	MOT; 9	**SUZ**; 4	SUG; 6	TAI; Ret	SEN; 14	SUG; Ret	5th	17
1999	Skill Speed	Mugen	SUZ; 7	TSU; 6	FUJ; 7	MIN; 2	FUJ; 6	SUZ; 4	**SUG**; 2	TAI; 4	MOT; 7	**SUZ**; Ret	7th	20

=== Complete Super GT results ===
Year	Team	Car	Class	1	2	3	4	5	6	7	8	9	DC	Pts
1999	Hitotsuyama Racing	BMW M3	GT300	SUZ; 12	FUJ; Ret	SUG; 12	MIN; 7	FUJ; 9	TAI; 14	MOT			25th	6
2000	Nakajima Racing	Honda NSX	GT500	MOT; 3	FUJ; 7	SUG; 1	FUJ; 9	TAI; 16	MIN; Ret	SUZ; 1			4th	58
2001	Team Kunimitsu	Honda NSX	GT500	TAI; 6	FUJ; 5	SUG; Ret	FUJ; 9	MOT; 4	SUZ; 13	MIN; 8			10th	29
2002	Dome Project	Honda NSX	GT500	TAI; 5	FUJ; 3	SUG; 3	SEP; 10	FUJ; 11	MOT; 16	MIN; 1	SUZ; 10		5th	59
2003	Mugen	Honda NSX	GT500	TAI; 4	FUJ; Ret	SUG; 9	FUJ; 12	FUJ; 8	MOT; 1	AUT; 10	SUZ; 11		10th	38
2004	Autobacs Racing Team Aguri	Honda NSX	GT500	TAI; 13	SUG; 9	SEP; 11	TOK; 12	MOT; 11	AUT; 13	SUZ; 11			15th	2
2005	Autobacs Racing Team Aguri	Honda NSX	GT500	OKA; 4	FUJ; 12	SEP; 2	SUG; 6	MOT; 16	FUJ; 8	AUT; 1	SUZ; 12		**2nd**	**61**
2006	Autobacs Racing Team Aguri	Honda NSX	GT500	SUZ; 3	OKA; 7	FUJ; 8	SEP; 1	SUG; 8	SUZ; 6	MOT; 15	AUT; 11	FUJ; 14	7th	68
2007	Autobacs Racing Team Aguri	Honda NSX	GT500	SUZ; 12	OKA; 1	FUJ; 9	SEP; 6	SUG; 1	SUZ; 2	MOT; 12	AUT; 1	FUJ; 8	**1st**	**94**
2008	Team LeMans	Lexus SC430	GT500	SUZ; 9	OKA; 13	FUJ; 6	SEP; 8	SUG	SUZ	MOT	AUT	FUJ; 3	16th	21
2009	Team LeMans	Lexus SC430	GT500	OKA; 10	SUZ; 4	FUJ; 6	SEP; 14	SUG; 5	SUZ; Ret	FUJ; 5	AUT; 10	MOT; 4	12th	35
2010	Team LeMans	Lexus SC430	GT500	SUZ; 2	OKA; 5	FUJ; 3	SEP; 4	SUG; 3	SUZ; 11	FUJ; C	MOT; 12		4th	51
2011	Team LeMans	Lexus SC430	GT500	OKA; 11	FUJ; 2	SEP; 8	SUG; 5	SUZ; 8	FUJ; 10	AUT; 13	MOT; 15		11th	26
2012	Team LeMans	Lexus SC430	GT500	OKA; 13	FUJ; 10	SEP; 3	SUG; 1	SUZ; Ret	FUJ; 10	AUT; 12	MOT; 12		10th	33
2013	Lexus Team TOM'S	Lexus SC430	GT500	OKA; 15	FUJ; 6	SEP; 10	SUG; 2	SUZ; 5	FUJ; 3	AUT; 9	MOT; 6		8th	47
2014	Lexus Team TOM'S	Lexus RC F	GT500	OKA; 1	FUJ; 5	AUT; 4	SUG; 2	FUJ; 9	SUZ; 7	BUR; 4	MOT; 2		2nd	79
2015	Lexus Team Petronas TOM'S	Lexus RC F	GT500	OKA; 14	FUJ; 3	CHA; 8	FUJ; 7	SUZ; 1	SUG; 13	AUT; 5	MOT; Ret		7th	49
2016	Lexus Team TOM'S	Lexus RC F	GT500	OKA; 8	FUJ; 4	SUG; 11	FUJ; 5	SUZ; 2	CHA; 11	MOT; 3	MOT; 4		5th	54
2017	Lexus Team au TOM's	Lexus LC 500	GT500	OKA	FUJ; 5	AUT	SUG	FUJ	SUZ	BUR	MOT		19th	6

=== Complete Formula Nippon results ===
(key) (Races in bold indicate pole position) (Races in italics indicate fastest lap)

Year	Team	1	2	3	4	5	6	7	8	9	10	DC	Pts
2002	TEAM 22	SUZ; 10	FUJ; 9	MIN; 10	SUZ; 9	MOT; 8	SUG; 9	FUJ; 8	MIN; 11	MOT; 10	SUZ; 8	NC	0

Sporting positions
Preceded by Juichi Wakisaka; André Lotterer	Super GT (GT500) Champion; 2007 with: Ralph Firman	Succeeded by Satoshi Motoyama; Benoît Tréluyer
