= Firman (surname) =

Firman is a surname. Notable people with the surname include:

- Armen Firman (810–887), 9th century inventor
- Bert Firman (1906–1999), English bandleader of the 1920s–1940s
- Brett Firman (born 1976), Australian rugby league footballer
- Conor Firman (born 1998), Irish hurler
- David Firman, English orchestral conductor, musical director and composer
- Humphrey Firman (1886–1916), English recipient of the Victoria Cross
- Natasha Firman (born 1976), English racing driver, sister of Ralph
- Patricia Firman (1922–1980), Australian model, actress and TV personality
- Pete Firman (born 1980), English magician, comedian and television presenter
- Ralph Firman (born 1975), Irish racing driver

== See also ==
- Firmani
