= Firmani =

Firmani is a surname. Notable people with the surname include:

- Eddie Firmani (born 1933), Italian football player and manager
- Fabio Firmani (born 1978), Italian football player

== See also ==
- Firman (surname)
