= Farman (surname) =

Farman is a surname. Notable people with the surname include:

- Georgina Farman (born 1991), English ice hockey player
- Henri Farman, Anglo-French aviator, aircraft designer, and manufacturer
- Joe Farman (1930–2013), British geophysicist
- Maurice Farman (1877–1964), British-French Grand Prix motor racing driver and aviator
