= Nakajima Racing =

Japanese Super Formula and Super GT team

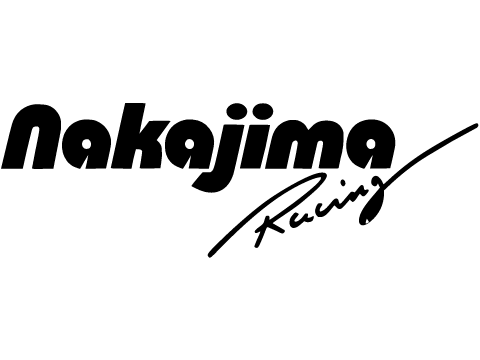
- Founded: 1983
- Base: Gotemba, Shizuoka Prefecture
- Team principal(s): Takuya Izawa
- Founder(s): Satoru Nakajima
- Current series: Super GT; Super Formula
- Former series: Japanese Touring Car Championship
- Current drivers: Super Formula: (Japan) Ren Sato; (Brazil) Igor Fraga; Super GT - GT500: (Japan) Riki Okusa; (Brazil) Igor Fraga

Nakajima Planning Co., Ltd, racing as Nakajima Racing, is a Super Formula and Super GT team organized and founded by Satoru Nakajima in 1983. The team has fielded four championship winners in the Formula Nippon racing series: Tom Coronel, Toranosuke Takagi, Ralph Firman and Loïc Duval. The organization races exclusively in Japan, although the drivers have different nationalities, and competes almost exclusively with Honda or Mugen based cars/engines.

== Drivers and veteran drivers ==
- (Netherlands) Tom Coronel
- (France) Loïc Duval
- (Republic of Ireland) Ralph Firman
- (Italy) Paolo Barilla
- (Japan) Takashi Kogure
- (Germany) André Lotterer
- (Japan) Tsugio Matsuda
- (Japan) Hidetoshi Mitsusada
- (Japan) Hideki Mutoh
- (Japan) Toranosuke Takagi
- (Japan) Naoki Yamamoto
- (Japan) Daisuke Nakajima
- (Belgium) Bertrand Baguette
- (Japan) Kosuke Matsuura

== Racing results ==
=== Complete JGTC results ===
(key) (Races in bold indicate pole position) (Races in italics indicate fastest lap)

Year	Car	Tyres	Class	No.	Drivers	1	2	3	4	5	6	7	8	9	Pos	Pts
1993	Honda Prelude	B	N1-2	6	(Japan) Koji Sato (Japan) Hidetoshi Mitsusada	FUJ	FUJ	SUZ; 2	FUJ						N/A	N/A
1998	Honda NSX	B	GT500	64	(Netherlands) Tom Coronel (Japan) Koji Yamanishi (Japan) Koji Sato	SUZ; 2	**FUJ**; C	SEN; Ret	FUJ; 1	MOT; Ret	MIN; 2	SUG; DNS	**NC1**; 1		2nd	50
1999	Honda NSX	B	GT500	64	(Netherlands) Tom Coronel (Japan) Koji Yamanishi (Japan) Hidetoshi Mitsusada	SUZ; 11	FUJ; 14	SUG; 4	MIN; Ret	FUJ; 8	**OKA**; 1	MOT; 5	**NC1**; 1		5th	41
2000	Honda NSX	B	GT500	64	(Japan) Daisuke Ito (Germany) Dominik Schwager	MOT; 3	FUJ; 7	SUG; 1	NC1; 3	FUJ; 9	OKA; 16	MIN; Ret	SUZ; 1		4th	58
2001	Honda NSX	B	GT500	64	(Germany) Dominik Schwager (Japan) Tsugio Matsuda	OKA; 3	FUJ; 12	SUG; 14	NC1; 8	FUJ; 6	**MOT**; 1	SUZ; Ret	MIN; Ret		8th	38
2002	Honda NSX	B	GT500	64	(Japan) Tsugio Matsuda (Republic of Ireland) Ralph Firman	**OKA**; 1	FUJ; 11	SUG; Ret	**SEP**; 1	FUJ; 12	MOT; 14	**MIN**; 6	SUZ; 1		2nd	74
2003	Honda NSX	B	GT500	64	(Japan) Tsugio Matsuda (Japan) Takashi Kogure (Germany) André Lotterer	OKA; 5	FUJ; 6	SUG; 8	FUJ; 13	FUJ; 9	MOT; Ret	AUT; 2	SUZ; 12		11th	36
2004	Honda NSX	B	GT500	32	(Japan) Tsugio Matsuda (Germany) André Lotterer	OKA; 10	SUG; 4	SEP; 9	TOK; 6	MOT; 1	AUT; 12	SUZ; 5	NC1; 2	NC2; 1	8th	42

=== Complete Super GT results ===
(key) (Races in bold indicate pole position) (Races in italics indicate fastest lap)

Year	Car	Class	No.	Drivers	1	2	3	4	5	6	7	8	9	Pos	Points
2005	Honda NSX	GT500	32	(Germany) André Lotterer (Japan) Tsugio Matsuda	OKA; 5	FUJ; 8	SEP; 5	SUG; 13	MOT; 10	FUJ; **2**	AUT; 21	SUZ; 10		9th	38
2006	Honda NSX	GT500	32	(France) Loïc Duval (Japan) Hideki Mutoh	SUZ; 15	OKA; Ret	FUJ; 7	SEP; 9	SUG; 5	SUZ; 4	MOT; 8	AUT; 12	FUJ; **1**	11th	51
2007	Honda NSX	GT500	32	(France) Loïc Duval (Brazil) Fabio Carbone	SUZ; 3	OKA; 4	FUJ; Ret	SEP; 15	SUG; 3	SUZ; 13	MOT; 4	AUT; 9	FUJ; 1	2nd	69
2008	Honda NSX	GT500	32	(France) Loïc Duval (Japan) Katsuyuki Hiranaka	SUZ; 10	OKA; 5	FUJ; 7	SEP; Ret	SUG; Ret	SUZ; 11	MOT; 5	AUT; 2	FUJ; 4	10th	43
2009	Honda NSX	GT500	32	(France) Loïc Duval (Japan) Yuhki Nakayama	OKA; 7	SUZ; 9	FUJ; 8	SEP; 11	SUG; 11	SUZ; Ret	FUJ; **9**	AUT; 9	MOT; 6	16th	18
2010	Honda HSV-010 GT	GT500	32	(Japan) Ryo Michigami (Japan) Yuhki Nakayama	SUZ; 10	OKA; 11	FUJ; 9	SEP; Ret	SUG; 11	SUZ; 7	FUJ; C	MOT; 9		14th	9
2011	Honda HSV-010 GT	GT500	32	(Japan) Ryo Michigami (Japan) Yuhki Nakayama	OKA; 15	FUJ; 10	SEP; 12	SUG; 3	SUZ; 13	FUJ; 12	AUT; 8	MOT; 5		12th	21
2012	Honda HSV-010 GT	GT500	32	(Japan) Ryo Michigami (Japan) Yuhki Nakayama	OKA; Ret	FUJ; 11	SEP; 11	SUG; 11	SUZ; Ret	FUJ; 14	AUT; 2	MOT; 3		14th	26
2013	Honda HSV-010 GT	GT500	32	(Japan) Ryo Michigami (Japan) Daisuke Nakajima	OKA; 18	FUJ; 13	SEP; 12	SUG; 8	SUZ; 13	FUJ; Ret	AUT; 10	MOT; 11		15th	4
2014	Honda NSX-GT	GT500	32	(Belgium) Bertrand Baguette (Japan) Daisuke Nakajima	OKA; 15	FUJ; Ret	AUT; 10	SUG; 13	FUJ; 3	SUZ; 12	BUR; Ret	MOT; 14		17th	12
2015	Honda NSX-GT	GT500	64	(Belgium) Bertrand Baguette (Japan) Daisuke Nakajima	OKA; Ret	FUJ; 12	CHA; Ret	FUJ; 11	SUZ; 9	SUG; Ret	AUT; 10	MOT; 13		15th	4
2016	Honda NSX-GT	GT500	64	(Belgium) Bertrand Baguette (Japan) Daisuke Nakajima	OKA; 14	FUJ; 10	SUG; 12	FUJ; 11	SUZ; 11	CHA; 5	MOT; 13	MOT; 14		18th	7
2017	Honda NSX-GT	GT500	64	(Japan) Kousuke Matsuura (Belgium) Bertrand Baguette	OKA; 12	FUJ; 13	AUT; 12	SUG; 8	FUJ; 12	SUZ; 1	CHA; 8	MOT; 10		11th	32
2018	Honda NSX-GT	GT500	64	(Japan) Kousuke Matsuura (Belgium) Bertrand Baguette	OKA; 15	FUJ; Ret	SUZ; 10	CHA; 9	FUJ; 13	SUG; 13	AUT; 10	MOT; 12		19th	4
2019	Honda NSX-GT	GT500	64	(India) Narain Karthikeyan (Japan) Tadasuke Makino	OKA; 10	FUJ; 10	SUZ; 11	BUR; 10	FUJ; 10	AUT; 7	SUG; 2	MOT; 12		12th	23.5
2020	Honda NSX-GT	GT500	64	(Japan) Takuya Izawa (Japan) Hiroki Otsu	FUJ; 13	FUJ; 13	SUZ; 4	MOT; 10	FUJ; 13	SUZ; 6	MOT; **2**	FUJ; 11		12nd	31
2021	Honda NSX-GT	GT500	64	(Japan) Takuya Izawa (Japan) Hiroki Otsu	OKA; 13	FUJ; 10	MOT**Ret**	SUZ; Ret	SUG; 8	AUT; 12	MOT; 13	FUJ; 12		18th	5
2022	Honda NSX-GT	GT500	64	(Japan) Takuya Izawa (Japan) Hiroki Otsu	OKA; 15	FUJ; 11	SUZ; 11	FUJ; 11	SUZ; 12	SUG; 7	AUT; 13	MOT; 12		15th	4
2023	Honda NSX-GT	GT500	64	(Japan) Takuya Izawa (Japan) Kakunoshin Ohta	OKA; 10	FUJ; 14	SUZ; 14	FUJ; 2	SUZ; 8	SUG; 11	AUT; 11	MOT; **Ret**		14th	19
2024	Honda Civic Type R-GT	GT500	64		OKA; 10	FUJ; 12	SUZ; 13	FUJ; 6	SUG; 14	HIT; Ret	AUT; 10	MOT; 13		13th	11
2025	Honda Civic Type R-GT	GT500	64		OKA; 9	FUJ; 13	SEP; 10	FUJ; 14	FUJ; 8	SUZ; 7	SUG; Ret	AUT -	MOT -	15th*	21.5

^{‡} Half points awarded as less than 75% of race distance was completed. * Season still in progress.

=== Complete Japanese Top Formula racing results ===
(key) (Races in bold indicate pole position) (Races in italics indicate fastest lap)

Year	Chassis	Engine	Tyres	No.	Drivers	1	2	3	4	5	6	7	8	9	10	11	12	D.C.	Pts	T.C.	Pts
All Japan Formula 2
1984	March 842	Honda RA264E	B	3	(Japan) Satoru Nakajima	**SUZ**; 1	**FUJ**; 3	**MIN**; Ret	SUZ; 9	**SUZ**; 1	**FUJ**; 2	**SUZ**; 1	SUZ; 1					**1st**	**107 (109)**	N/A	N/A
1985	March 85J	Honda RA264E Honda RA265E	B	1	(Japan) Satoru Nakajima	SUZ; 2	FUJ; 1	**MIN**; 1	**SUZ**; 1	**SUZ**; 2	**FUJ**; 2	**SUZ**; 1	**SUZ**; 1					**1st**	**115 (145)**	N/A	N/A
1986	March 86J	Honda RA266E	B	1	(Japan) Satoru Nakajima	SUZ; 2	**FUJ**; 2	MIN; 4	**SUZ**; 1	**SUZ**; 2	**FUJ**; 3	**SUZ**; 2	SUZ; 4					**1st**	**92 (112)**	N/A	N/A
Japanese Formula 3000
1987	March 87B	Honda RA387E	B	3	(Japan) Toshio Suzuki	SUZ; 3	FUJ; Ret	MIN; 1	SUZ; 5	SUZ; 6	SUG; 8	FUJ; 2	SUZ; Ret	SUZ; 5				5th	72	N/A	N/A
1988	March 87B	Mugen MF308	B	3	(Japan) Akio Morimoto	SUZ; 10	FUJ; Ret	MIN; 11	SUZ; 8	SUG; Ret								13th	0	N/A	N/A
1988	Reynard 88D	Mugen MF308	B	3	(Japan) Akio Morimoto						FUJ; Ret	SUZ; 7	SUZ; 7					13th	0	N/A	N/A
1989	Lola T88/50	Mugen MF308	B	2	(Japan) Osamu Nakako	SUZ; NC	FUJ; 10	MIN; 7	SUZ; 11	SUG; 6	FUJ; 9	SUZ; 15	SUZ; 13					17th	1	N/A	N/A
1989	Lola T89/50	Mugen MF308	B	12	(Italy) Paolo Barilla	SUZ; 8	FUJ; Ret	MIN; 2	SUZ; Ret	SUG; Ret	FUJ; Ret	SUZ; 10	SUZ; Ret					10th	6	N/A	N/A
1990	Lola T90/50	Mugen MF308	B	2	(Japan) Osamu Nakako	SUZ; 5	FUJ; 7	MIN; Ret	SUZ; Ret	SUG; Ret	FUJ; 16	FUJ; 7	SUZ; 9	FUJ; 9	SUZ; 6			16th	3	N/A	N/A
1990	Reynard 90D	Mugen MF308	B	12	(Japan) Koji Sato	SUZ; Ret	FUJ; Ret	MIN; 15	SUZ; 17	SUG; DNQ	FUJ; DNQ	FUJ; 14	SUZ; Ret	FUJ; Ret	SUZ; 11			NC	0	N/A	N/A
1991	Lola T90/50	Mugen MF308	B	2	(Japan) Osamu Nakako	SUZ; 10	AUT; 11	FUJ; Ret	MIN; 8	SUZ; Ret	SUG; Ret	FUJ; 20	SUZ; DNQ	FUJ; C		FUJ; DNQ		NC	0	N/A	N/A
1991	Lola T90/50	Mugen MF308	B	2	(Portugal) Pedro Chaves										SUZ; DSQ			NC	0	N/A	N/A
1991	Ralt RT23	Mugen MF308	B	12	(Japan) Takuya Kurosawa	SUZ; Ret	AUT; 8	FUJ; 6	MIN; 7	SUZ; Ret	SUG; 15	FUJ; 11				FUJ; Ret		22nd	1	N/A	N/A
1991	Reynard 90D	Mugen MF308	B	12	(Japan) Takuya Kurosawa									FUJ; C	SUZ; 17			22nd	1	N/A	N/A
1991	Reynard 90D	Mugen MF308	B	12	(Japan) Koji Sato								SUZ; Ret					NC	0	N/A	N/A
1992	Ralt RT24J	Mugen MF308	B	12	(Japan) Shinji Nakano	SUZ; DNQ	FUJ; 12	MIN; Ret	SUZ; DNQ									NC	0	N/A	N/A
1992	Reynard 92D	Mugen MF308	B	12	(Japan) Shinji Nakano					AUT; Ret	SUG; 12	FUJ; 13	FUJ; 14	SUZ; 16	FUJ; 17	SUZ; 9		NC	0	N/A	N/A
1993	Reynard 93D	Mugen MF308	B	14	(Japan) Masahiko Kageyama	SUZ; 12	FUJ; 8	MIN; 6	SUZ; Ret	AUT; C	SUG; 2	FUJ; C	FUJ; 8	SUZ; Ret	FUJ; Ret	SUZ; 11		10th	7	N/A	N/A
1993	Reynard 93D	Mugen MF308	B	15	(Japan) Yasutaka Hinoi	SUZ; Ret	FUJ; 14	MIN; 10	SUZ; Ret	AUT; C	SUG; 22	FUJ; C	FUJ; 14	SUZ; 13	FUJ; 15	SUZ; Ret		NC	0	N/A	N/A
1994	Reynard 94D	Mugen MF308	B	15	(Japan) Yasutaka Hinoi	SUZ; 9	FUJ; Ret	MIN; 8	SUZ; Ret	SUG; Ret	FUJ; 11	SUZ; Ret	FUJ; 9	FUJ; 13	SUZ; Ret			NC	0	N/A	N/A
1994	Reynard 94D	Mugen MF308	B	16	(Japan) Masahiko Kageyama	SUZ; 16	FUJ; Ret	MIN; 11	SUZ; Ret	SUG; 9	FUJ; Ret	SUZ; 5	FUJ; Ret	FUJ; 11	SUZ; 8			13th	2	N/A	N/A
1994	Reynard 93D	Mugen MF308	B	36	(Japan) Toranosuke Takagi	SUZ	FUJ	MIN	SUZ	SUG	FUJ	SUZ; 7	FUJ; 8	FUJ	SUZ; 9			NC	0	N/A	N/A
1994	Reynard 93D	Mugen MF308	B	65	(Japan) Shinji Nakano	SUZ	FUJ	MIN	SUZ	SUG	FUJ	SUZ	FUJ	FUJ	SUZ; Ret			NC	0	N/A	N/A
1995	Reynard 95D	Mugen MF308	B	64	(Japan) Toranosuke Takagi	SUZ; 7	FUJ; C	MIN; 5	SUZ; Ret	**SUG**; 1	FUJ; 12	**TOK**; 1	FUJ; 1	SUZ; Ret				**2nd**	**29**	N/A	N/A
1995	Reynard 95D	Mugen MF308	B	65	(Japan) Takuya Kurosawa	SUZ; 2	FUJ; C	MIN; Ret	**SUZ**; 4	SUG; Ret	FUJ; 9	TOK; Ret	FUJ; 7	SUZ; 2				6th	15	N/A	N/A
Formula Nippon
1996	Reynard 96D	Mugen MF308	B	64	(Japan) Toranosuke Takagi	**SUZ**; Ret	MIN; 3	FUJ; Ret	**TOK**; Ret	**SUZ**; 1	**SUG**; 1	FUJ; Ret	MIN; Ret	SUZ; 6	FUJ; Ret			4th	25	**3rd**	**35**
1996	Reynard 96D	Mugen MF308	B	65	(Japan) Takuya Kurosawa	SUZ; Ret	MIN; 8	FUJ; 15	TOK; 7	SUZ; 2	SUG; 5	FUJ; 8	MIN; 5	SUZ; 8	FUJ; Ret			9th	10	**3rd**	**35**
1997	Reynard 97D	Mugen MF308	B	64	(Japan) Toranosuke Takagi	**SUZ**; Ret	**MIN**; DNS	FUJ; 3	**SUZ**; 1	SUG; Ret	FUJ; Ret	**MIN**; 5	MOT; Ret	FUJ; Ret	SUZ; 5			6th	18	4th	20
1997	Reynard 97D	Mugen MF308	B	65	(Japan) Koji Yamanishi	SUZ; 5	MIN; Ret	FUJ; 8	SUZ; Ret	SUG; Ret	FUJ; Ret	MIN; Ret	MOT; 17	FUJ; Ret	SUZ; 7			15th	2	4th	20
1998	Reynard 97D	Mugen MF308	B	64	(Japan) Koji Yamanishi	SUZ; Ret	MIN; 7	FUJ; Ret	MOT; Ret		SUG; 6	FUJ; C	MIN; Ret	FUJ; Ret	SUZ; 11			16th	1	8th	10
1998	Reynard 97D	Mugen MF308	B	64	(Japan) Tsugio Matsuda					SUZ; 6								15th	1	8th	10
1998	Reynard 97D	Mugen MF308	B	65	(Netherlands) Tom Coronel	SUZ; 8	MIN; 6	FUJ; Ret	MOT; 4	SUZ; 5	SUG; 5	FUJ; C	MIN; Ret	FUJ; Ret	SUZ; 14			11th	8	8th	10
1999	Reynard 99L	Mugen MF308	B	64	(Netherlands) Tom Coronel	SUZ; 2	**MOT**; Ret	MIN; 3	FUJ; 1	SUZ; 2	**SUG**; 1	**FUJ**; 1	**MIN**; Ret	MOT; 3	SUZ; Ret			**1st**	**50**	**1st**	**81**
1999	Reynard 99L	Mugen MF308	B	65	(Japan) Hidetoshi Mitsusada	**SUZ**; 3	MOT; 1	MIN; 8	FUJ; 10	SUZ; 5	SUG; 11	FUJ; 4	MIN; 1	MOT; 5	SUZ; 9			**3rd**	**31**	**1st**	**81**
2000	Reynard 2KL	Mugen MF308	B	0	(Japan) Toranosuke Takagi	SUZ; 1	**MOT**; 1	**MIN**; Ret	FUJ; 1	**SUZ**; 1	**SUG**; 1	**MOT**; 1	FUJ; 1	**MIN**; 1	SUZ; 2			**1st**	**86**	**1st**	**113**
2000	Reynard 99L	Mugen MF308	B	2	(Japan) Tsugio Matsuda	SUZ; 12	MOT; 3	MIN; 1	FUJ; Ret	SUZ; 5	SUG; 11	MOT; 4	FUJ; Ret	MIN; 3	SUZ; 3			4th	27	**1st**	**113**
2001	Reynard 2KL	Mugen MF308	B	1	(Japan) Tsugio Matsuda	SUZ; Ret	MOT; 3	MIN; 8	FUJ; Ret	SUZ; 5	SUG; 5	FUJ; Ret	MIN; Ret	MOT; 9	**SUZ**; 9			10th	8	4th	37
2001	Reynard 99L	Mugen MF308	B	2	(Republic of Ireland) Ralph Firman	SUZ; 5	MOT; Ret	MIN; 2	FUJ; 6	SUZ; Ret	SUG; Ret	FUJ; 7	MIN; Ret	**MOT**; 1	SUZ; 1			4th	29	4th	37
2002	Reynard 01L	Mugen MF308	B	31	(Republic of Ireland) Ralph Firman	**SUZ**; 1	FUJ; 2	**MIN**; Ret	SUZ; 1	MOT; 9	SUG; 1	FUJ; 2	MIN; 2	MOT; 1	SUZ; 3			**1st**	**62**	**1st**	**81**
2002	Reynard 01L	Mugen MF308	B	32	(Japan) Tsugio Matsuda	SUZ; 3	FUJ; 10	MIN; 2	SUZ; Ret	MOT; Ret	SUG; 5	FUJ; Ret	MIN; 4	MOT; 4	SUZ; 6			5th	19	**1st**	**81**
2003	Lola B03/51	Mugen MF308	B	1	(Japan) Takashi Kogure	SUZ; 12	FUJ; 6	MIN; Ret	MOT; DNS	SUZ; 6	SUG; Ret	FUJ; Ret	MIN; 14	MOT; 4	SUZ; 2			10th	11	3rd	33
2003	Lola B03/51	Mugen MF308	B	2	(Germany) André Lotterer	SUZ; 2	FUJ; 4	MIN; 7	MOT; 6	SUZ; Ret	**SUG**; 2	FUJ; 3	MIN; 9	MOT; 5	SUZ; Ret			5th	22	3rd	33
2004	Lola B3/51	Mugen MF308	B	31	(Germany) André Lotterer	SUZ; 2	SUG; 4	MOT; 1	SUZ; 8	SUG; Ret	MIN; Ret	**SEP**; 1	MOT; 3	SUZ; 7				**2nd**	**33**	2nd	50
2004	Lola B3/51	Mugen MF308	B	32	(Japan) Takashi Kogure	SUZ; 1	SUG; 9	MOT; 9	SUZ; 7	SUG; 2	MIN; Ret	SEP; 6	MOT; 9	SUZ; 8				7th	17	2nd	50
2005	Lola B3/51	Mugen MF308	B	31	(Germany) André Lotterer	MOT; 11	SUZ; Ret	SUG; 9	FUJ; Ret	SUZ; Ret	MIN; 10	FUJ; 1	MOT; Ret	SUZ; 1				4th	20	3rd	35
2005	Lola B3/51	Mugen MF308	B	32	(Japan) Takashi Kogure	MOT; Ret	SUZ; 3	**SUG**; 3	FUJ; 8	SUZ; 2	MIN; Ret	FUJ; 11	MOT; 9	SUZ; 6				5th	15	3rd	35
2006	Lola FN06	Honda HF386E	B	31	(France) Loïc Duval	FUJ; 11	SUZ; 1	MOT; 6	SUZ; Ret	AUT; 18	FUJ; 9	SUG; 1	MOT; 4	SUZ; 6				4th	25	3rd	26
2006	Lola FN06	Honda HF386E	B	32	(Japan) Hideki Mutoh	FUJ; 19	SUZ; 6	MOT; 8	SUZ; Ret	AUT; 17	FUJ; 16	SUG; 10	MOT; 10	SUZ; Ret				14th	1	3rd	26
2007	Lola FN06	Honda HF386E	B	31	(France) Loïc Duval	FUJ; 3	SUZ; 4	MOT; Ret	OKA; 19	SUZ; 11	FUJ; 3	SUG; 3	MOT; 2	SUZ; Ret				6th	31	2nd	72
2007	Lola FN06	Honda HF386E	B	32	(Japan) Takashi Kogure	FUJ; 8	SUZ; 3	MOT; 1	**OKA**; 5	SUZ; 17	FUJ; Ret	**SUG**; 1	**MOT**; 1	**SUZ**; DSQ				**3rd**	**41**	2nd	72
2008	Lola FN06	Honda HF386E	B	31	(France) Loïc Duval	FUJ; 10	SUZ; 10	MOT; 3	OKA; 1	SUZ; 6	SUZ; 2	MOT; 1	MOT; Ret	FUJ; 2	FUJ; 7	SUG; 3		**2nd**	**62**	2nd	103
2008	Lola FN06	Honda HF386E	B	32	(Japan) Takashi Kogure	FUJ; 6	SUZ; 5	MOT; Ret	OKA; 9	SUZ; 3	SUZ; 7	MOT; 5	MOT; Ret	FUJ; 3	FUJ; 6	SUG; 2		5th	41	2nd	103
2009	Swift 017.n	Honda HR09E	B	31	(France) Loïc Duval	FUJ; 4	SUZ; 1	MOT; Ret	**FUJ**; 1	**SUZ**; 1	MOT; 2	AUT; 3	**SUG**; 1					**1st**	**62**	1st	93
2009	Swift 017.n	Honda HR09E	B	32	(Japan) Takashi Kogure	FUJ; 8	SUZ; Ret	**MOT**; 1	FUJ; 7	SUZ; 2	**MOT**; 6	**AUT**; 1	SUG; 10					4th	37	1st	93
2010	Swift 017.n	Honda HR10E	B	31	(Japan) Naoki Yamamoto	SUZ; 7	MOT; 5	FUJ; 7	MOT; 4	SUG; Ret	AUT; 5	SUZ; 6	SUZ; 5	FUJ‡ 8	FUJ‡ 2			7th	20.5	3rd	56.5
2010	Swift 017.n	Honda HR10E	B	32	(Japan) Takashi Kogure	SUZ; 1	MOT; 6	FUJ; 5	MOT; 2	SUG; 5	AUT; Ret	SUZ; 2	SUZ; 3	FUJ‡ 6	FUJ‡ DSQ			4th	38	3rd	56.5
2011	Swift 017.n	Honda HR10E	B	31	(Japan) Daisuke Nakajima	SUZ; 11	AUT; Ret	FUJ; 8	MOT; 9	SUZ; C	SUG; 10	MOT; 11	MOT; 7	FUJ‡ Ret				13th	2	5th	18.5
2011	Swift 017.n	Honda HR10E	B	32	(Japan) Takashi Kogure	SUZ; 2	AUT; Ret	FUJ; 7	MOT; Ret	SUZ; C	SUG; 7	MOT; 5	MOT; 4	FUJ‡ 12				7th	16.5	5th	18.5
2012	Swift 017.n	Honda HR12E	B	31	(Japan) Daisuke Nakajima	SUZ; 16	MOT; 10	AUT; 11	FUJ; 11	MOT; 12	SUG; 12	SUZ; 10	SUZ; 11	FUJ‡ 9				16th	0	7th	4
2012	Swift 017.n	Honda HR12E	B	32	(Japan) Takashi Kogure	SUZ; 15	MOT; Ret	AUT; 10	FUJ; 10	MOT; 13	SUG; Ret	SUZ; 6	SUZ; 4	FUJ‡ 11				10th	4	7th	4
Super Formula
2013	Swift SF13	Honda HR12E	B	31	(Japan) Daisuke Nakajima	SUZ; 16	AUT; Ret	FUJ; 11	MOT; 10	SUG; 7	SUZ; 2	SUZ; 11	FUJ‡ Ret					12th	6	6th	21
2013	Swift SF13	Honda HR12E	B	32	(Japan) Takashi Kogure	SUZ; 3	AUT; Ret	FUJ; 14	MOT; 5	SUG; 8	SUZ; 15	SUZ; 2	FUJ‡ 18					8th	15	6th	21
2014	Dallara SF14	Honda HR-414E	B	31	(Japan) Daisuke Nakajima	SUZ; Ret	FUJ; 9	FUJ; 14	FUJ; 9	MOT; 16	AUT; 12	SUG; 5	SUZ; 9	SUZ; 15				14th	4	9th	4
2014	Dallara SF14	Honda HR-414E	B	32	(Japan) Takashi Kogure	SUZ; Ret	FUJ; Ret	FUJ; DNS	FUJ; Ret	MOT; 11	AUT; Ret	SUG; 10	SUZ; Ret	SUZ; 16				17th	0	9th	4
2015	Dallara SF14	Honda HR-414E	B	64	(Japan) Daisuke Nakajima	SUZ; 6	OKA; 12	FUJ; Ret	MOT; 5	AUT; 9	SUG; 12	SUZ; Ret	SUZ; 10					10th	7	7th	7
2015	Dallara SF14	Honda HR-414E	B	65	(Belgium) Bertrand Baguette	SUZ; 10	OKA; 11	FUJ; Ret	MOT; 15	AUT; 16	SUG; 18	SUZ; 11	SUZ; Ret					18th	0	7th	7
2016	Dallara SF14	Honda HR-414E	Y	64	(Japan) Daisuke Nakajima	SUZ; Ret	OKA; 7	FUJ; DNS	MOT; 10	OKA; 6	OKA; 12	SUG; 2	SUZ; 10	SUZ; 10				12th	10.5	5th	15
2016	Dallara SF14	Honda HR-414E	Y	65	(Belgium) Bertrand Baguette	SUZ; 8	OKA; 14	FUJ; 14	MOT; Ret	OKA; 14	OKA; 18	SUG; 9	SUZ; 6	SUZ; 5				15th	4.5	5th	15
2017	Dallara SF14	Honda HR-414E	Y	64	(Japan) Daisuke Nakajima	SUZ; 7	OKA; 16	OKA; 14	FUJ; 11	MOT; 12	AUT; 11	SUG; 17	SUZ; C	SUZ; C				16th	2	10th	2
2017	Dallara SF14	Honda HR-414E	Y	65	(India) Narain Karthikeyan	SUZ; 13	OKA; 17	OKA; 13	FUJ; 14	MOT; Ret	AUT; Ret	SUG; 13	SUZ; C	SUZ; C				19th	0	10th	2
2018	Dallara SF14	Honda HR-414E	Y	64	(India) Narain Karthikeyan	SUZ; 17	AUT; C	SUG; 5	FUJ; 16	MOT; 11	OKA; 13	SUZ; 17						15th	4	8th	8
2018	Dallara SF14	Honda HR-414E	Y	65	(Japan) Takuya Izawa	SUZ; 5	AUT; C	SUG; 14	FUJ; 15	MOT; 14	OKA; 14	SUZ; 16						16th	4	8th	8
2019	Dallara SF19	Honda HR-414E	Y	64	(Spain) Álex Palou	SUZ; Ret	AUT; 6	SUG; 13	**FUJ**; 1	**MOT**; 4	OKA; 4	**SUZ**; 19						3rd	26	3rd	28
2019	Dallara SF19	Honda HR-414E	Y	65	(Japan) Tadasuke Makino	**SUZ**; Ret	AUT; 4	SUG; 14	FUJ; 10	MOT; Ret	OKA; 17	SUZ; 13						16th	6	3rd	28
2020	Dallara SF19	Honda HR-414E	Y	64	(Japan) Tadasuke Makino	MOT; 9	OKA; Ret	SUG; 7	AUT; 3	SUZ; Ret	SUZ; 8							12th	20	5th	57
2020	Dallara SF19	Honda HR-414E	Y	64	(Japan) Hiroki Otsu							FUJ; 13						25th	0	5th	57
2020	Dallara SF19	Honda HR-414E	Y	65	(Japan) Toshiki Oyu	MOT; 15	OKA; 15	SUG; 12	AUT; 10	SUZ; 8	SUZ; 1	FUJ; 2						6th	41	5th	57
2021	Dallara SF19	Honda HR-414E	Y	1	(Japan) Naoki Yamamoto	FUJ; 6	SUZ; 8	AUT; 9	SUG; 12	MOT; 12	MOT; Ret	SUZ; 9						13th	13	4th	47
2021	Dallara SF19	Honda HR-414E	Y	64	(Japan) Toshiki Oyu	FUJ; 2	SUZ; 10	AUT; 7	SUG; 2	MOT; 6	MOT; 14	SUZ; 11						5th	41	4th	47
2022	Dallara SF19	Honda HR-414E	Y	64	(Japan) Naoki Yamamoto	FUJ; 14	FUJ; 14	SUZ; 9	AUT; 14	SUG; 12	FUJ; 9	**MOT**; 1	MOT; 16	SUZ; 11	SUZ; 6			10th	32	5th	67
2022	Dallara SF19	Honda HR-414E	Y	65	(Japan) Toshiki Oyu	FUJ; 7	FUJ; 11	SUZ; 13	AUT; Ret	SUG; 2	FUJ; 10	MOT; Ret	**MOT**; 5	SUZ; 4	SUZ; 7			8th	43	5th	67
2023	Dallara SF23	Honda HR-417E	Y	64	(Japan) Naoki Yamamoto	FUJ; 4	FUJ; 15	SUZ; 11	AUT; 9	SUG; 13	FUJ; 7	MOT; Ret						13th	14	7th	31.5
2023	Dallara SF23	Honda HR-417E	Y	64	(Japan) Hiroki Otsu								SUZ; 17	SUZ; WD				24th	0	7th	31.5
2023	Dallara SF23	Honda HR-417E	Y	65	(Japan) Ren Sato	FUJ; 6	FUJ; 9	SUZ; DNS	AUT; 7	SUG; 12	FUJ; 5	MOT; 16	SUZ; 10	SUZ; Ret				10th	17.5	7th	31.5
2024	Dallara SF23	Honda HR-417E	Y	64	(Japan) Naoki Yamamoto	SUZ; 3	AUT; 4	SUG; DNS	FUJ; 10	MOT; 4	FUJ; 8	FUJ; Ret	SUZ; 7	SUZ; 6				8th	41	5th	61
2024	Dallara SF23	Honda HR-417E	Y	65	(Japan) Ren Sato	SUZ; 5	AUT; Ret	SUG; 11	FUJ; 7	MOT; 10	FUJ; 7	FUJ; DSQ	SUZ; Ret	SUZ; 5				11th	22	5th	61
2025	Dallara SF23	Honda HR-417E	Y	64	(Japan) Ren Sato	SUZ; 3	SUZ; 6	MOT; Ret	MOT; 12	AUT; 4	FUJ; 11	FUJ; 6	SUG; Ret	FUJ; 5	SUZ; 9	SUZ; 6	SUZ; 2	7th	56	4th	127.5
2025	Dallara SF23	Honda HR-417E	Y	65	(Brazil) Igor Omura Fraga	SUZ; 18	SUZ; 5	MOT; 3	MOT; 9	AUT; 8	FUJ; 9	FUJ; 18	SUG; 6	FUJ; 8	SUZ; 2	SUZ; 1	SUZ; 4	6th	77.5	4th	127.5
