= Ralph Firman =

British-Irish racing driver (born 1975)

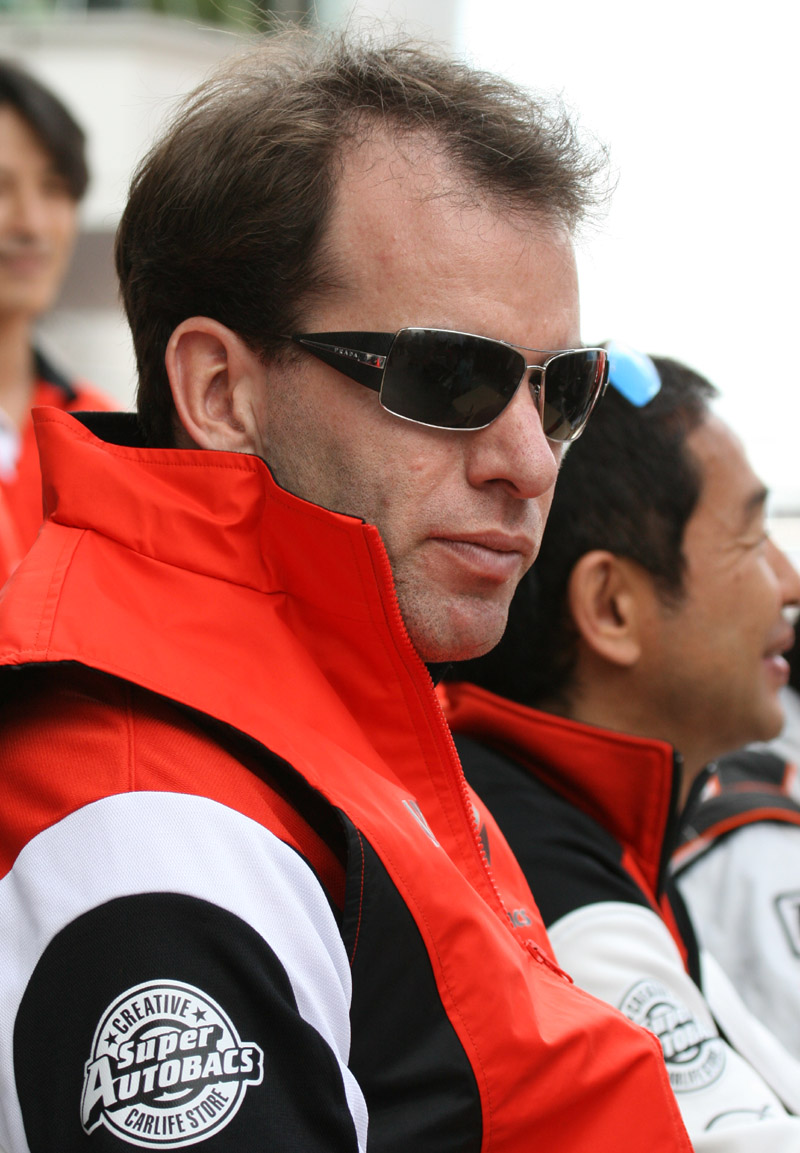
- Firman in 2008
- Nationality: (Republic of Ireland) Irish
- Born: Ralph David Firman Jr. 20 May 1975 (age 51) Norwich, Norfolk, England, United Kingdom
Ralph Firman
Formula One World Championship career
- Active years: 2003
- Team: Jordan
- Entries: 15 (14 starts)
- Championships: 0
- Wins: 0
- Podiums: 0
- Career points: 1
- Pole positions: 0
- Fastest laps: 0
- First entry: 2003 Australian Grand Prix
- Last entry: 2003 Japanese Grand Prix
24 Hours of Le Mans career
- Years: 2004
- Teams: Racing for Holland
- Best finish: NC
- Class wins: 0

Ralph David Firman Jr. (born 20 May 1975) is an Irish former racing driver who last raced under an Irish licence. His father, Ralph Firman Sr., co-founded the Van Diemen racecar constructor with Ross Ambrose, father of V8 Supercars champion Marcos, then more recently founded RFR. Firman won the 2002 Formula Nippon Championship, as well as the 2007 Super GT Series. He was also runner up in the 2002, 2005 and 2009 Super GT Series. He is married to Aldís Kristín Árnadóttir, an Icelandic UK-educated lawyer. Firman's sister, Natasha, is also a racing driver.

== Career ==
=== Formula Three ===
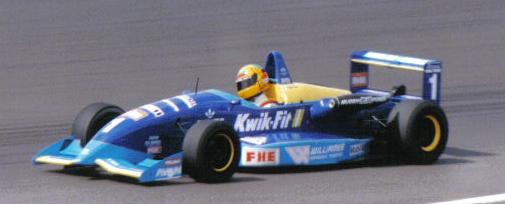
Firman driving for Paul Stewart Racing at Silverstone during the 1995 British Formula 3 Championship season.

Educated at Gresham's School between 1988 and 1993, Firman went straight into motor racing on leaving school. Despite leading much of the 1995 British F3 championship, he lost the title at the final round to Oliver Gavin. However, he continued in the championship in 1996 and captured the title at his second attempt.

==== Macau Grand Prix ====
Firman won the prestigious Macau Grand Prix in 1996 despite crashing out of the race. At the end of round 1, Firman finished ahead of German Formula 3 champion Jarno Trulli. In round 2, he was overtaken by Trulli on the last lap after breaking his front wing. He then crashed at the hairpin corner, blocking the track. The race was stopped as a result, and the results declared at the end of the previous lap, when Firman was ahead of Trulli, thus giving him the win.

=== Formula Nippon ===
Firman then moved to Japan, culminating in the 2002 Formula Nippon championship, before returning to Europe.

=== Formula One ===
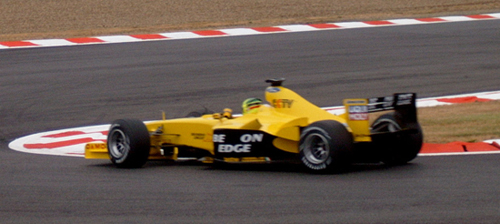
Firman driving for Jordan at the 2003 French GP.

Firman secured a seat in Formula One for the 2003 season at the Jordan team, alongside Giancarlo Fisichella. He participated in 14 Formula One Grands Prix, debuting at the 2003 Australian Grand Prix. He scored one championship point, in the 2003 Spanish Grand Prix. This point was the first for a Republic of Ireland driver since Derek Daly in 1982. He was injured in a huge crash during practice for the 2003 Hungarian Grand Prix which forced him to sit out that and the next race, in which he was replaced by Zsolt Baumgartner.

In November 2003, Firman drove a Jordan-Ford EJ13 at Macau's Guia Circuit as part of the Macau Grand Prix's 50th anniversary celebrations, the first time that a contemporary F1 machine had been seen in action around the tight and tricky Guia circuit. Firman clocked an impressive 1:59.4 seconds lap, 13 seconds quicker than F3 poleman Fabio Carbone managed on the same day.

=== Post-Formula One ===
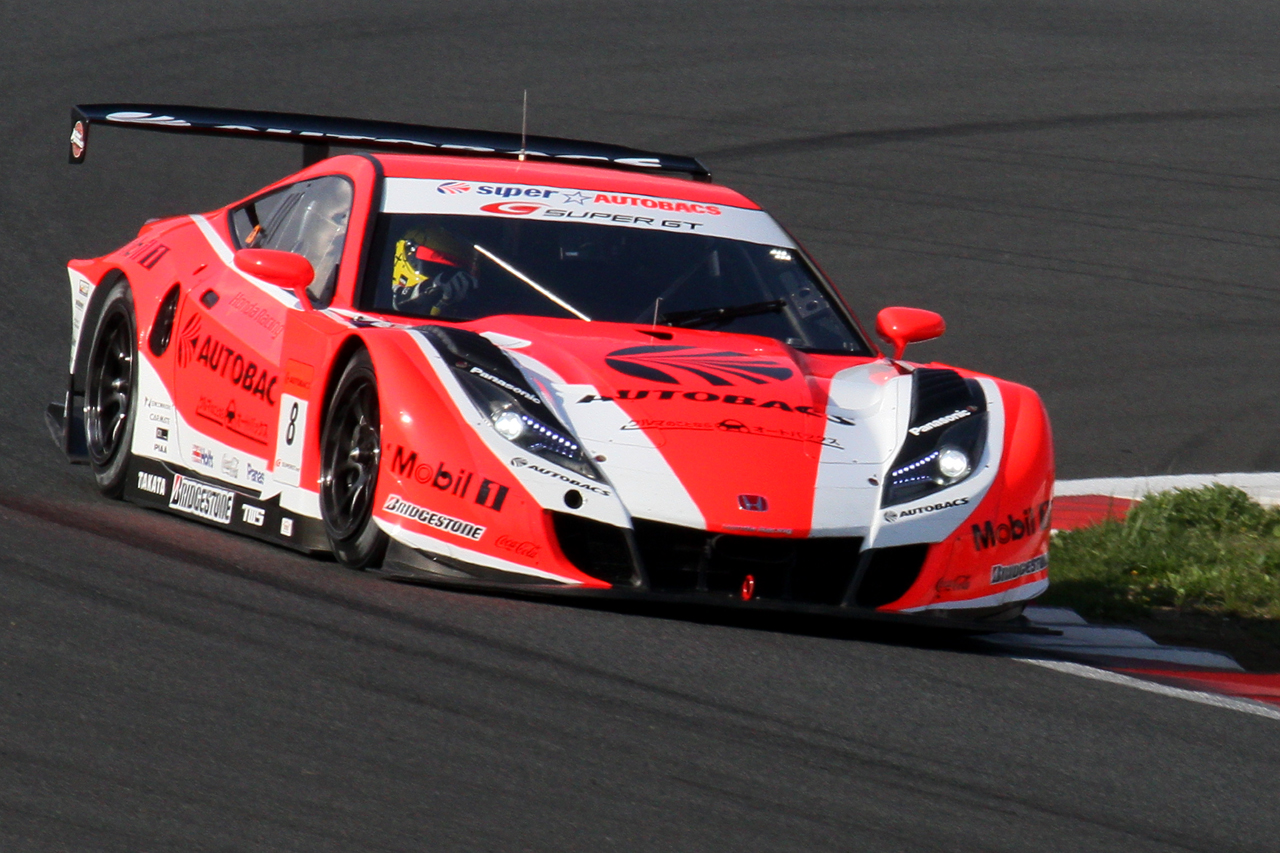
Firman driving the Honda HSV-010 GT for ARTA at the 2010 Super GT Fuji 400km race.

Firman has also competed in the 24 Hours of Le Mans, and was an official test driver for the A1 Grand Prix series in August 2004.

In August 2005, it was announced that Firman would be the driver for A1 Team Ireland. He had previously been seen to be in competition for the Great Britain seat.

In 2007, Firman, along with Daisuke Itō, won the Japan Super GT GT500 class championship with the Aguri Suzuki co-owned ARTA team. Firman and Ito won the championship before the final race of the season, a first in the series' competitive history.

=== Retirement from racing ===
Firman retired from racing in 2013, and now runs a British engineering company.

== Racing career ==
=== Career summary ===
Season	Series	Team	Races	Poles	Wins	FLaps	Podiums	Points	Position
1993	Formula Vauxhall Junior	?	?	9	11	?	?	?	?
1994	Formula Vauxhall Lotus	?	?	?	5	?	?	?	4th
1995	British Formula Three Championship	Paul Stewart Racing	18	9	6	4	9	176	**2nd**
1995	Masters of Formula 3	Paul Stewart Racing	1	0	0	0	0	N/A	10th
1995	Macau Grand Prix	San Miguel Paul Stewart Racing	1	0	0	0	0	N/A	NC
1995	Formula One	Marlboro McLaren Mercedes	Test driver						
1996	British Formula Three Championship	Paul Stewart Racing	15	4	3	4	8	188	**1st**
1996	Macau Grand Prix	San Miguel Paul Stewart Racing	1	0	1	0	1	N/A	**1st**
1996	Masters of Formula 3	Paul Stewart Racing	1	0	0	0	0	N/A	NC
1997	Formula Nippon Championship	Team TMS	10	0	0	0	1	12	8th
1997	All Japan Grand Touring Car Championship	Team TMS	4	0	0	0	0	4	24th
1997	Macau Grand Prix	San Miguel Paul Stewart Racing	1	0	0	0	0	N/A	NC
1998	Formula Nippon Championship	Team Nova	9	0	0	0	2	13	8th
1999	Formula Nippon Championship	Team Nova	10	1	1	2	3	21	4th
1999	All Japan Grand Touring Car Championship	Team Taeivon Ralliart	7	0	0	0	2	42	6th
2000	Formula Nippon Championship	Team Taeivon Ralliart	10	0	0	0	1	9	9th
2000	All Japan Grand Touring Car Championship	Toyota Team Sard	7	0	0	0	1	25	12th
2001	Formula Nippon Championship	Nakajima Racing	10	1	2	1	3	29	4th
2002	Formula Nippon Championship	Nakajima Racing	10	2	4	1	8	62	**1st**
2002	All Japan Grand Touring Car Championship	Nakajima Racing	8	0	3	0	3	74	**2nd**
2003	Formula One	Jordan	14	0	0	0	0	1	19th
2004	24 Hours of Le Mans	Racing for Holland	1	0	0	0	0	N/A	NC
2005	Super GT	Autobacs Racing Team Aguri	8	0	2	0	1	61	**2nd**
2005-06	A1 Grand Prix	Ireland	16	0	0	2	1	68	8th
2006	Super GT	Autobacs Racing Team Aguri	9	0	1	0	2	68	7th
2007	Super GT	Autobacs Racing Team Aguri	9	0	3	0	4	91	**1st**
2007-08	A1 Grand Prix	Ireland	2	0	0	0	0	8	6th
2008	Super GT	Autobacs Racing Team Aguri	9	0	0	0	3	49	8th
2009	Super GT	Autobacs Racing Team Aguri	9	0	2	0	5	81	**2nd**
2010	Super GT	Autobacs Racing Team Aguri	7	0	1	0	1	29	11th
2012	Super GT	Autobacs Racing Team Aguri	8	0	0	0	0	12	16th
2013	Super GT	Autobacs Racing Team Aguri	8	0	1	0	1	31	11th

=== Complete British Formula 3 results ===
(key) (Races in bold indicate pole position) (Races in italics indicate fastest lap)

Year	Entrant	Engine	1	2	3	4	5	6	7	8	9	10	11	12	13	14	15	16	17	18	DC	Pts
1995	Paul Stewart Racing	Mugen	**SIL**; 1	**SIL**; 1	THR; Ret	THR; 2	DON; Ret	**SIL**; 2	SIL; 3	**DON**; Ret	**DON**; 1	**OUL**; 9	**BRH**; 1	**BRH**; 1	SNE; Ret	**PEM**; 1	PEM; 7	SIL; DSQ	SIL; 12	THR; 7	2nd	176
1996	Paul Stewart Racing	Mugen	SIL; 4	SIL; 2	**THR**; 3	**DON**; DNS	**BRH**; 1	**BRH**; 1	OUL; 1	DON; 2	SIL; 2	THR; 2	SNE; 6	SNE; C	PEM; 13	PEM; 5	ZAN; 5	ZAN; 4	SIL; 4		1st	188

=== Complete Formula Nippon results ===
(key) (Races in bold indicate pole position) (Races in italics indicate fastest lap)

Year	Entrant	1	2	3	4	5	6	7	8	9	10	DC	Points
1997	Team TMS	SUZ; Ret	MIN; 4	FUJ; 15	SUZ; 6	SUG; 2	FUJ; 13	MIN; Ret	MOT; 5	FUJ; Ret	SUZ; 11	8th	12
1998	Team Nova	**SUZ**; 12	MIN; Ret	FUJ; Ret	MOT; 14	SUZ; Ret	SUG; 2	FUJ; C	MIN; 4	FUJ; 3	SUZ; 7	7th	13
1999	Team Nova	SUZ; Ret	MOT; 3	MIN; 2	FUJ; 9	SUZ; Ret	SUG; 6	FUJ; 10	MIN; 9	MOT; 8	**SUZ**; 1	4th	21
2000	Team Nova	**SUZ**; Ret	MOT; 11	MIN; Ret	FUJ; 6	SUZ; 7	SUG; 2	MOT; 10	FUJ; 13	MIN; 5	SUZ; Ret	9th	9
2001	Nakajima Racing	SUZ; 5	MOT; Ret	MIN; 2	FUJ; 6	SUZ; Ret	SUG; Ret	FUJ; 7	MIN; 8	**MOT**; 1	SUZ; 1	4th	29
2002	Nakajima Racing	**SUZ**; 1	FUJ; 2	**MIN**; Ret	SUZ; 1	MOT; 9	SUG; 1	FUJ; 2	MIN; 2	MOT; 1	SUZ; 3	**1st**	**62**

=== Complete JGTC/Super GT results ===
Year	Team	Car	Class	1	2	3	4	5	6	7	8	9	DC	Points
1997	Team TMS	Porsche 911 GT2	GT500	SUZ; 13	FUJ; 7	SEN; 13	FUJ; 13	MIN	SUG; DNQ				24th	4
1999	Team Taeivon Ralliart	Mitsubishi FTO	GT300	SUZ; 2	FUJ; Ret	SUG; 5	MIN; Ret	FUJ; 3	TAI; 8	MOT; 7			6th	42
2000	Toyota Team SARD	Toyota Supra	GT500	MOT; 10	FUJ; Ret	SUG; 6	FUJ; 2	TAI; Ret	MIN; 8	SUZ; 16			12th	25
2002	Nakajima Racing	Honda NSX	GT500	TAI; 1	FUJ; 11	SUG; Ret	SEP; 1	FUJ; 12	MOT; 14	MIN; 6	SUZ; 1		**2nd**	**74**
2005	Autobacs Racing Team Aguri	Honda NSX	GT500	OKA; 4	FUJ; 12	SEP; 2	SUG; 6	MOT; 16	FUJ; 8	AUT; 1	SUZ; 12		**2nd**	**61**
2006	Autobacs Racing Team Aguri	Honda NSX	GT500	SUZ; 3	OKA; 7	FUJ; 8	SEP; 1	SUG; 8	SUZ; 6	MOT; 15	AUT; 11	FUJ; 14	7th	68
2007	Autobacs Racing Team Aguri	Honda NSX	GT500	SUZ; 12	OKA; 1	FUJ; 9	SEP; 6	SUG; 1	SUZ; 2	MOT; 12	AUT; 1	FUJ; 8	**1st**	**94**
2008	Autobacs Racing Team Aguri	Honda NSX	GT500	SUZ; 14	OKA; 3	FUJ; Ret	SEP; 11	SUG; 15	SUZ; 13	MOT; 2	AUT; 3	FUJ; 12	8th	49
2009	Autobacs Racing Team Aguri	Honda NSX	GT500	OKA; 3	SUZ; 14	FUJ; 3	SEP; 3	SUG; 14	SUZ; 12	FUJ; 1	AUT; 4	MOT; 1	**2nd**	**81**
2010	Autobacs Racing Team Aguri	Honda HSV-010 GT	GT500	SUZ; Ret	OKA; 6	FUJ; 11	SEP; 11	SUG; 12	SUZ; 1	FUJ; C	MOT; 7		11th	29
2012	Autobacs Racing Team Aguri	Honda HSV-010 GT	GT500	OKA; 6	FUJ; Ret	SEP; 12	SUG; Ret	SUZ; 7	FUJ; 9	AUT; 11	MOT; 13		16th	12
2013	Autobacs Racing Team Aguri	Honda HSV-010 GT	GT500	OKA; 9	FUJ; 8	SEP; 8	SUG; 1	SUZ; 12	FUJ; 8	AUT; 14	MOT; 15		11th	31

=== Complete Formula One results ===
(key)

Year	Entrant	Chassis	Engine	1	2	3	4	5	6	7	8	9	10	11	12	13	14	15	16	WDC	Pts
2003	Jordan Ford	Jordan EJ13	Ford V10	AUS; Ret	MAL; 10	BRA; Ret	SMR; Ret	ESP; 8	AUT; 11	MON; 12	CAN; Ret	EUR; 11	FRA; 15	GBR; 13	GER; Ret	HUN; WD	ITA	USA; Ret	JPN; 14	19th	1

=== Complete World Series by Nissan results ===
(key) (Races in bold indicate pole position) (Races in italics indicate fastest lap)

Year	Entrant	1	2	3	4	5	6	7	8	9	10	11	12	13	14	15	16	17	18	DC	Pts
2004	Gabord Reyco	JAR; 1; 14	JAR; 2 Ret	ZOL; 1 DNS	ZOL; 2 DNS	MAG; 1	MAG; 2	VAL; 1	VAL; 2	LAU; 1	LAU; 2	EST; 1	EST; 2	CAT; 1	CAT; 2	VAL; 1	VAL; 2	JER; 1	JER; 2	30th	0

=== Complete 24 Hours of Le Mans results ===
Year	Team	Co-Drivers	Car	Class	Laps	Pos.	Class Pos.
2004	(Netherlands) Racing for Holland	(Netherlands) Tom Coronel (United Kingdom) Justin Wilson	Dome S101-Judd	LMP1	313	DNF	DNF

=== Complete A1 Grand Prix results ===
(key) (Races in bold indicate pole position) (Races in italics indicate fastest lap)

Year	Entrant	1	2	3	4	5	6	7	8	9	10	11	12	13	14	15	16	17	18	19	20	21	22	DC	Points	Ref
2005–06	Ireland	GBR; SPR	GBR; FEA	GER; SPR; 9	GER; FEA; 6	POR; SPR; 19	POR; FEA; 3	AUS; SPR	AUS; FEA	MYS; SPR; 7	MYS; FEA; 9	UAE; SPR; 4	UAE; FEA; Ret	RSA; SPR; 4	RSA; FEA; Ret	IDN; SPR; 6	IDN; FEA; Ret	MEX; SPR; Ret	MEX; FEA; Ret	USA; SPR; 5	USA; FEA; 6	CHN; SPR	CHN; FEA	8th	68	
2007–08	Ireland	NED; SPR; 8	NED; FEA; 6	CZE; SPR	CZE; FEA	MYS; SPR	MYS; FEA	ZHU; SPR	ZHU; FEA	NZL; SPR	NZL; FEA	AUS; SPR	AUS; FEA	RSA; SPR	RSA; FEA	MEX; SPR	MEX; FEA	SHA; SPR	SHA; FEA	GBR; SPR	GBR; SPR			6th	94	

Sporting positions
Preceded by Oliver Gavin	British Formula 3 Championship; Champion; 1996	Succeeded by Jonny Kane
Preceded by Ralf Schumacher	Macau Grand Prix; Winner; 1996	Succeeded by Soheil Ayari
Preceded by Satoshi Motoyama	Formula Nippon; Champion; 2002	Succeeded by Satoshi Motoyama
Preceded by Juichi Wakisaka; André Lotterer	Super GT; GT500 Champion; 2007; With: Daisuke Itō	Succeeded by Satoshi Motoyama; Benoît Tréluyer
Awards
Preceded by Dario Franchitti	McLaren Autosport BRDC Award; 1993	Succeeded by Jamie Davies
