= Mugen MF308 =

Overview
- Manufacturer: Mugen
- Production: 1988–2005

Layout
- Configuration: 90° V8
- Displacement: 2,997 cc (3 L; 183 cu in)
- Cylinder bore: 86 mm (3.39 in)
- Piston stroke: 64.5 mm (2.54 in)
- Cylinder block material: Aluminium alloy
- Cylinder head material: Aluminium alloy
- Valvetrain: 32-valve (four-valves per cylinder), DOHC

Combustion
- Fuel system: Honda PGM-FI Electronic indirect multi-point port fuel injection
- Management: Honda PGM-IG
- Fuel type: Petrol
- Oil system: Dry sump
- Cooling system: Single water pump

Output
- Power output: 490–500 hp (365–373 kW)
- Torque output: 363 N⋅m (268 lb⋅ft)

The Mugen MF308 is a naturally aspirated, petrol-powered, 3.0 L (180 cu in), V8 racing engine, designed, developed, and built by Mugen Motorsports, for Formula 3000 racing categories, between 1988 and 2005. It produced between 490–500 hp (370–370 kW) over its lifetime. It famously powered Jean Alesi to the 1989 International Formula 3000 Championship, with Eddie Jordan Racing.

== Performance / main specifications ==
- Model: V-type 8-cylinder, 4-valve DOHC, naturally aspirated
- Displacement: 2,997 cc (182.9 cu in)
- Bank angle: 90 degrees
- Bore x Stroke: 86.0 mm (3.39 in) x 64.5 mm (2.54 in)
- Maximum output: > 460 hp at 8,500 rpm
- Maximum torque: 362.5 N⋅m (267.4 lb⋅ft) at 7,500 rpm

== History ==
=== Background ===
In 1983, Honda signed a joint development contract with British racing engine builder Engine Development ( Judd ) for a V8 2.65L turbo engine for indie cars at the time. This was born from the idea that adding two cylinders to a V6 2.0L engine for F2 would make it 2.65L.

In 1985, the engine for Indy was completed, but Honda handed over all rights to the engine to Judd instead of terminating the contract with Judd because he concentrated on F1 activities and "no participation in IndyCar". This completed engine is "Jud AV". However, this story is not over, and Honda plans to make it for the F3000 by remodeling this engine. As a result, a joint development contract for the F3000 engine will be signed with Judd. As a result, the "Jud BV" was born, which increased the stroke of the "Jud AV" to 3.0L.

In 1986, the "Judd BV", renamed the "Honda RA386E", was mounted on a Ralt chassis and made its debut at the International F3000 Championship.

In 1987, the "Judd BV" sent to Japan was tuned at Honda R & D (Wako) and supplied to the All Japan F2 Championship as the "Honda RA387E".

=== Birth of the MF308 ===
During the All Japan F2 Championship, Honda, which had overwhelmed Hart and BMW engines, limited the engine supply quota to a small number. On the other hand, Yamaha supplied the engine to all those who wanted it, so Honda was sometimes criticized. In response to the shift of the All Japan Championship from F2 to F3000 from the reflection at this time, "Honda RA387E" is entrusted to "I want to aim for Cosworth in Japan" infinitely. Although it had undergone design changes on the assumption that it would be supplied to many users, the "MUGEN MF308", which had almost the same specifications as the RA387E, was born.

In 1988, supply to the All Japan F3000 Championship began, and Kazuyoshi Hoshino's drive made his debut win in the opening round. This year's record was 5 wins out of 8 races.

It was also supplied to the International F3000 Championship from 1989 and became the champion engine by Jean Alesi of EJR.

In the international F3000, DAMS's Eric Comas won the championship in 1990, and eight of the top 10 rankings used the MF308 engine. In 1991, Christian Fittipaldi was made the champion. Withdraw from International F3000 at the end of the 1992 season.

=== Until the retirement of the MF308 ===
The MF308, which started supply in 1988, will be delivered to each team by domestic engine tuners such as Tomei Engine and Ogawa Motor. Maintenance and tuning were also performed for each tuner. Infinite himself also participated as a tuner for advanced development. In 1988, he competed with the "Cosworth Yamaha OX77" and in 1989 with the " Ford Cosworth DFV Engine " (both Ken Matsuura Racing Service Tune). It will be supplied to the international F3000 after its domestic debut but withdrew after the introduction of the one-make system in 1996 and the adoption of "Judd KV" (supplied by Zytec).

In the All Japan F3000, the DFV of Ken Matsuura Racing Service took the position of the champion engine in 1991 and 1993.

In 1996, the All Japan F3000 Championship has renamed the All Japan Championship Formula Nippon. From this year, Ken Matsuura Racing Service will start delivering the MF308.

From 1998, it will be a de facto one-make.

In 2005, the supply to Formula Nippon was discontinued because the mold of the cylinder block was exhausted so much that it might be difficult to supply it for a long time in the future. The total results of All Japan F3000-Formula Nippon are 172 races and 161 wins.

During this time, MUGEN itself and each tuner have been constantly improving, MUGEN has developed and tested the parts related to basic performance, and the others have been improved for each tuner. Some of them have a short stroke with a bore of 88mm and are used until the final race. Finally, the maximum output was increased to about 500PS and the maximum torque was increased to about 412 N⋅m (304 lb⋅ft). Others that have been stored are trials such as the variable pipe length air supply system and the butterfly throttle, which are prohibited by the rules. During the period when MUGEN was doing F1 activities, advanced development using MF308 was also done.

== Features of the MF308 ==
The MF308 adopted a method of operating the intake/exhaust valve via the rocker arm while using DOHC. Normally, the mainstream of DOHC engines is "direct push" where the camshaft pushes the valve directly, and it can be said that the MF308 is extremely rare as a racing engine. Since the rocker arm can determine the valve lift amount regardless of the camshaft profile, it seems that the F3000 regulation, which limits the number of revolutions to 9,000 rpm, was rather convenient. However, on the other hand, considering that the cylinder head becomes large and the structure supports the latter half of the body of the formula car, the rigidity tends to be insufficient.

== Later usage ==
The Mugen MF308 engine also utilized by Audi in Deutsche Tourenwagen Masters in 2000 until 2018 but rebadged as Audi Sport and thus utilized the MF308N designation.
