= Tsugio Matsuda =

Japanese racing driver

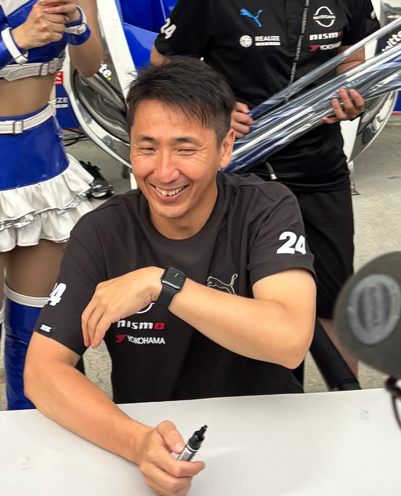
- Matsuda at the 2025 Super GT Malaysia Festival
- Nationality: (Japan) Japanese
- Born: June 18, 1979 (age 47) Kuwana, Mie, Japan

Super GT career
- Categorisation: FIA Platinum
- Years active: 2000–2025
- Teams: Team Impul, Nakajima, Take One, Nismo, Kondo
- Starts: 203
- Championships: 2 (2014 & 2015)
- Wins: 25
- Podiums: 51
- Poles: 3
- Best finish: 1st in 2014, 2015

Previous series
- 1998–2013: Formula Nippon

Championship titles
- 2014 & 2015 2007 & 2008: Super GT - GT500; Formula Nippon

Tsugio Matsuda (松田 次生, Matsuda Tsugio; born June 18, 1979) is a Japanese professional racing driver for Nissan and Kondo Racing in the Super GT Series, and a team ambassador for KCMG in the Super Formula Championship.

Matsuda is the Super GT Series' all-time career wins leader in the GT500 class, and a two-time GT500 class champion in 2014 and 2015. He raced in Super Formula from 1998 to 2013, and won back-to-back series titles in 2007 and 2008, when the series was known as Formula Nippon.

Matsuda has also represented Nissan in the FIA World Endurance Championship and Intercontinental GT Challenge.

== Career ==
=== Early career ===
Matsuda began his karting career in 1993, and achieved a notable result by winning the 1996 CIK/FIA Asia-Pacific Championship ICA Class race at his home track, Suzuka Circuit. He enrolled in the Suzuka Circuit Racing School Formula (SRS-F) in 1997 and graduated alongside classmates Toshihiro Kaneishi and future two-time Indianapolis 500 winner Takuma Sato.

Matsuda made the step up to the All-Japan Formula Three Championship in 1998, driving for Satoru Nakajima. He won his first race at the new Twin Ring Motegi circuit and finished fourth in the championship. Matsuda remained in All-Japan F3 for 1999, and finished fifth in the championship. After the season, he finished fourth in that year's Macau Grand Prix.

=== Formula Nippon/Super Formula ===
During his rookie season in All-Japan F3, Matsuda was called on to drive for Nakajima Racing in the fifth round of the Formula Nippon Championship at Suzuka, replacing Koji Yamanishi. Just a few weeks after his 19th birthday, Matsuda finished sixth and scored a championship point on debut.

Matsuda's first full-time ride in Formula Nippon came two years later when he joined Nakajima Racing alongside the returning Toranosuke Takagi. In just his fourth career race at Miné Circuit, Matsuda won the race, becoming the youngest Japanese driver to win a Formula Nippon race at 20 years, 11 months, and 3 days old.

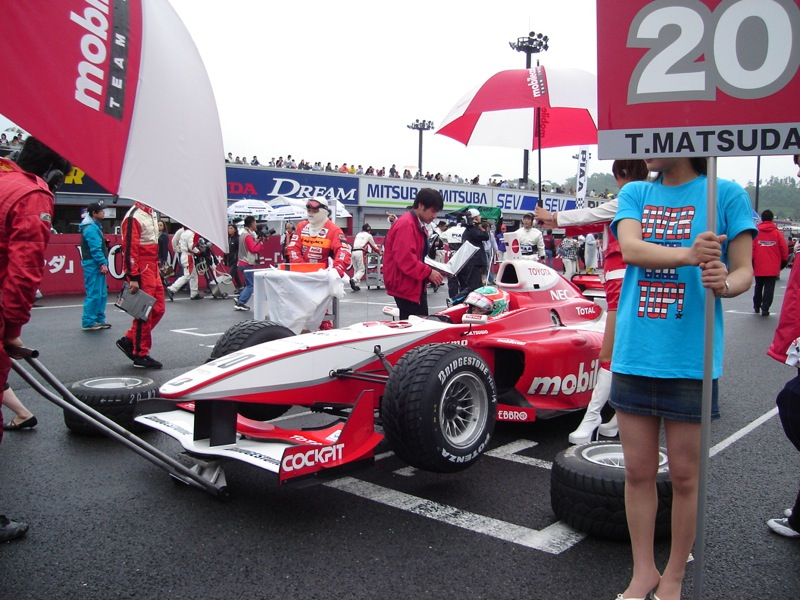
Tsugio Matsuda on the grid for a Formula Nippon (now Super Formula) race at Motegi in 2006.

Matsuda transferred from Nakajima Racing to Cerumo in 2003, then from Cerumo to Team 5Zigen in 2005. At the last race of the season, Matsuda talked with Team Impul founder Kazuyoshi Hoshino, who was seeking a driver to replace Yuji Ide at his team after his departure to Formula One. Matsuda joined Impul in 2006, and enjoyed his finest season to date - with a win at Autopolis, six podiums, and a pole position. He finished as runner-up in the championship to team-mate Benoît Tréluyer.

The following season, Matsuda won an unlikely first series championship in Formula Nippon, despite not winning a race. He was consistent throughout 2007, with eight top-five finishes in nine races. Matsuda was crowned the champion shortly after the final round at Suzuka after Takashi Kogure, who provisionally won the race and was champion-elect, was later disqualified when his car failed post-race technical inspection instead.

Matsuda would return in 2008, and had his best-ever season. He won three races in a row to open the season, four of the first five, with five straight pole positions in each. He clinched the championship at Fuji with two races remaining, and became the first driver since the formation of the Japan Race Promotion (JRP) to win back-to-back Formula Nippon Championship titles. Matsuda finished the season with five wins, six pole positions, and seven podiums.

Matsuda slumped the following season and finished 11th in the 2009 standings out of just 13 drivers. He was replaced by a returning João Paulo de Oliveira in 2010, while Matsuda joined Kondo Racing from the fourth round. A lack of sponsorship forced him to miss the 2011 season, but at the non-championship JAF Grand Prix round at Fuji Speedway, Matsuda returned to drive for KCMG in place of an absent Alexandre Imperatori.

Matsuda rejoined Impul in 2012 as Oliveira's team-mate. He returned to the podium with a second-place finish at Suzuka. Matsuda then opened the 2013 season, in what was now known as the Super Formula Championship, with another second-place finish, also at Suzuka.

Six years after his last race as a Super Formula driver, Matsuda was appointed team principal of KCMG in 2019. He continued in this role through 2023, then became a team ambassador

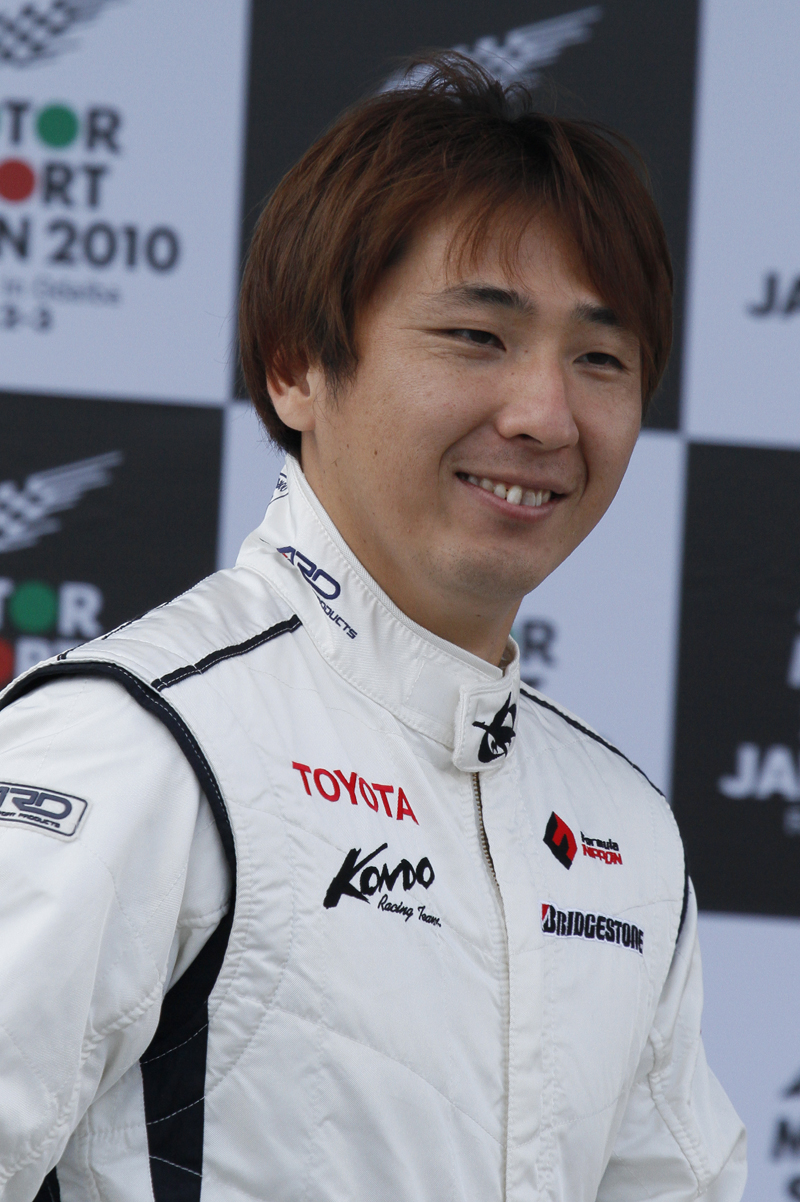
Matsuda in 2010

=== JGTC/Super GT ===
In the same year that Matsuda made his full-time Formula Nippon debut, he made his All-Japan Grand Touring Car Championship GT500 class debut on 10 September at TI Circuit Aida, driving the number 30 McLaren F1 GTR for privateer Team Take One. Matsuda finished fourth in his debut race, and despite retiring from the final two races, he finished 19th in the championship standings.

==== Honda (2001-2005) ====
Matsuda began racing full-time in GT500 in 2001. He spent the following five seasons driving for Nakajima Racing and scored his first career win at Twin Ring Motegi.

Matsuda's most successful season during this time was in 2002, partnered with Ralph Firman. They won three races that season, but Matsuda and Firman lost the Drivers' Championship by one point to Toyota Team LeMans' Akira Iida and Juichi Wakisaka.

For most of the next three seasons, Matsuda drove alongside future three-time 24 Hours of Le Mans winner André Lotterer. Matsuda and Lotterer won the 2004 round at Motegi, and finished second in the 2005 summer race at Fuji following an intense battle for the lead between Matsuda and eventual series champion, Yuji Tachikawa.

==== Nissan (2006-2025) ====
Concurrent to his move to Team Impul in Formula Nippon, and after rejecting an offer to stay with Honda for what he described as a "mid-tier team", Matsuda transferred from Honda to Nissan for the 2006 season. He drove for the flagship NISMO team through 2007. Joined by Satoshi Motoyama, Matsuda won his first race as a Nissan driver at Autopolis in 2006.

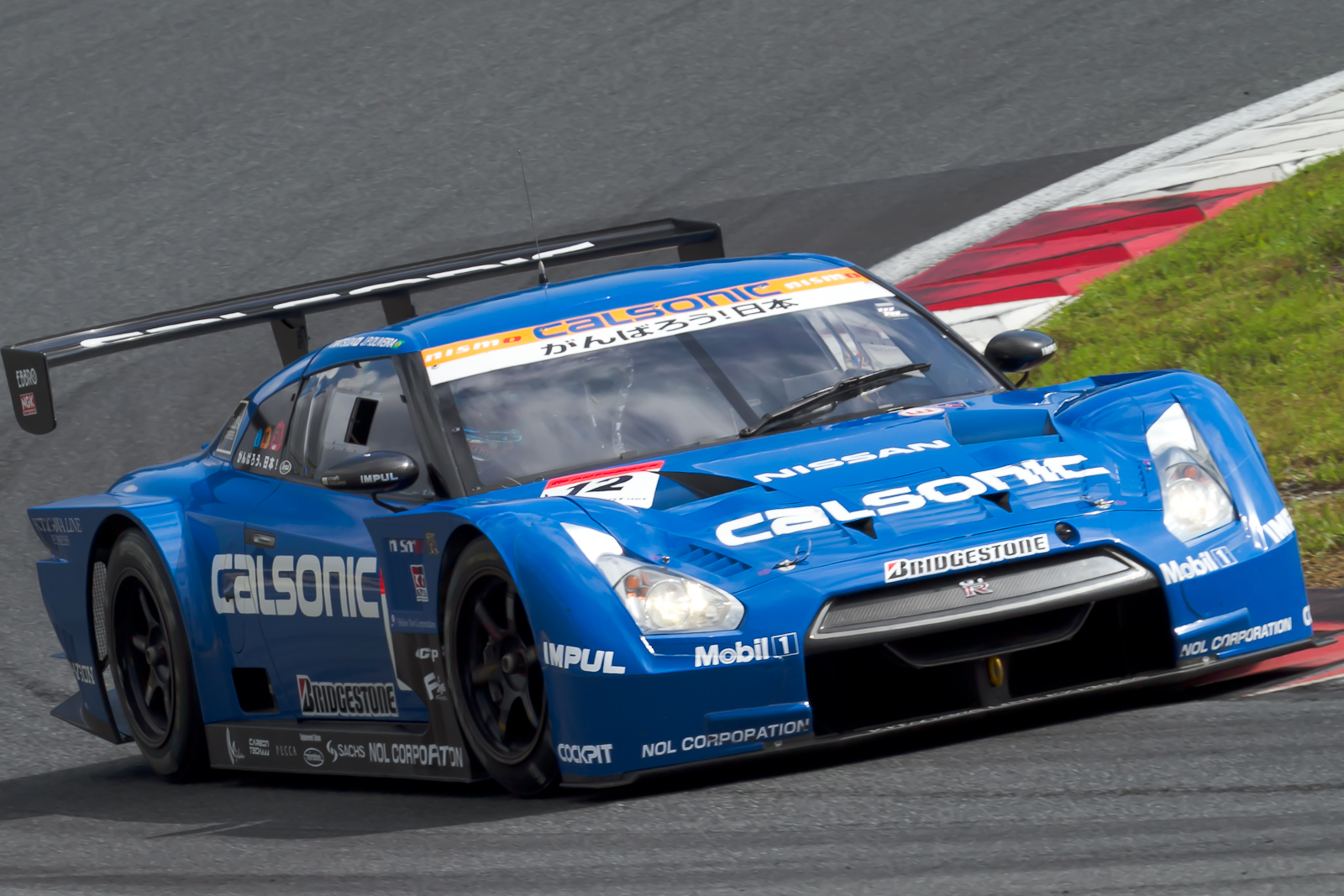
Matsuda driving the number 12 Calsonic Impul Nissan GT-R in 2011.

After two seasons, Matsuda transferred from Nismo to Team Impul, the team for which he already drove for in Formula Nippon. Driving the Calsonic Nissan GT-R (R35), Matsuda missed the fifth round at Sportsland Sugo due to illness, but came back in the following round and won the 2008 Suzuka 1000km alongside Sébastien Philippe. Matsuda and Philippe also won the season finale at Fuji, and finished fifth and fourth in the championship standings respectively. Team Impul's form dipped in 2009, managing just one podium finish in the Suzuka 300 km.

Matsuda and Team Impul rebounded in 2010 with the addition of new co-driver Ronnie Quintarelli. Matsuda and Quintarelli won their first race together at Sepang Circuit. Quintarelli left for the new MOLA team in 2011 and won back-to-back GT500 championships, while Matsuda remained at Team Impul, partnered with newly-crowned Formula Nippon champion João Paulo de Oliveira. Matsuda and Oliveira won one race in each of their three seasons together but could never win the championship title. Matsuda and Oliveira entered the seventh round of the 2013 season tied for the championship lead with two races remaining, but after a crash at Autopolis and a non-scoring finish at Motegi, they dropped to ninth in the final standings.

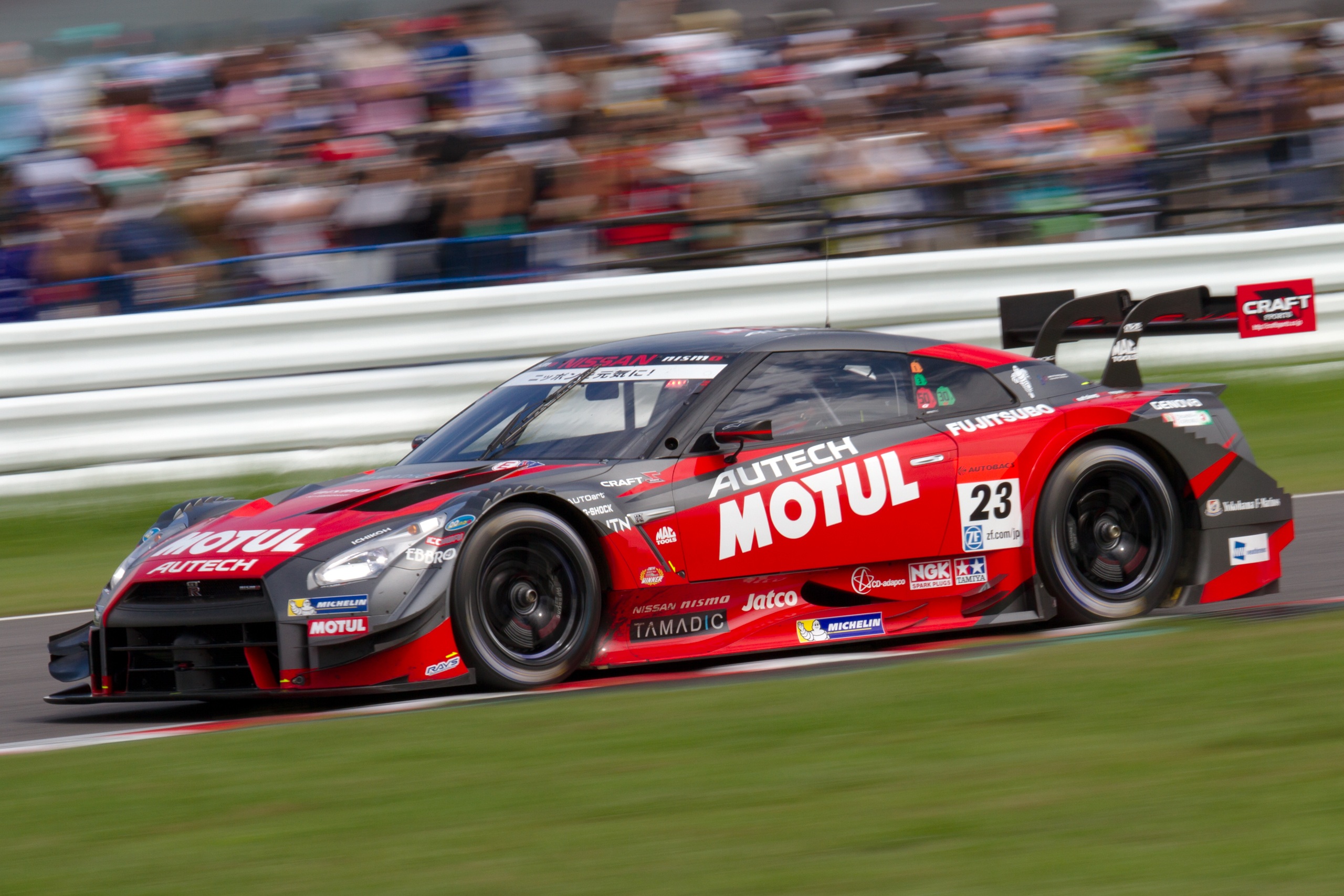
Matsuda and Ronnie Quintarelli won the 2014 Super GT Series GT500 championship driving the number 23 Motul Autech Nissan GT-R.

Matsuda rejoined NISMO for the 2014 season, reuniting with Quintarelli aboard the number 23 Motul Autech Nissan GT-R and driving with Michelin tyres for the first time in his career. NISMO had not won a race in GT500 since 2011, but Matsuda and Quintarelli ended the team's winless drought and led a Nissan 1-2-3 finish at Autopolis. Entering the final round at Motegi, Matsuda and Quintarelli were six points behind championship leader James Rossiter. Matsuda and Quintarelli won the race from pole position, and after a first-lap collision between Rossiter and Oliveira, Matsuda won his first GT500 championship after 15 years.

Matsuda and Quintarelli's championship defence kicked off with a win at the Fuji 500 km race on Golden Week, and the duo remained consistent throughout the season. In the penultimate round at Autopolis, Matsuda won a fierce battle with Team Impul driver Hironobu Yasuda and went on to win the race, allowing Matsuda and Quintarelli to close within two points of Yasuda and Oliveira before the season finale at Motegi. Matsuda and Quintarelli finished in second place, two places ahead of Yasuda and Oliveira, to clinch back-to-back GT500 championships.

At the opening round of the 2016 season at Okayama, Matsuda and Quintarelli won the race. It was Matsuda's 17th career win, which put him ahead of Tachikawa and Motoyama for sole possession of the all-time wins record in GT500. They won the following race, the Fuji 500 km, for Matsuda's 18th career win. Despite winning back-to-back races to open the season, Matsuda and Quintarelli fell short of an unprecedented triple championship, and finished third in the final standings.

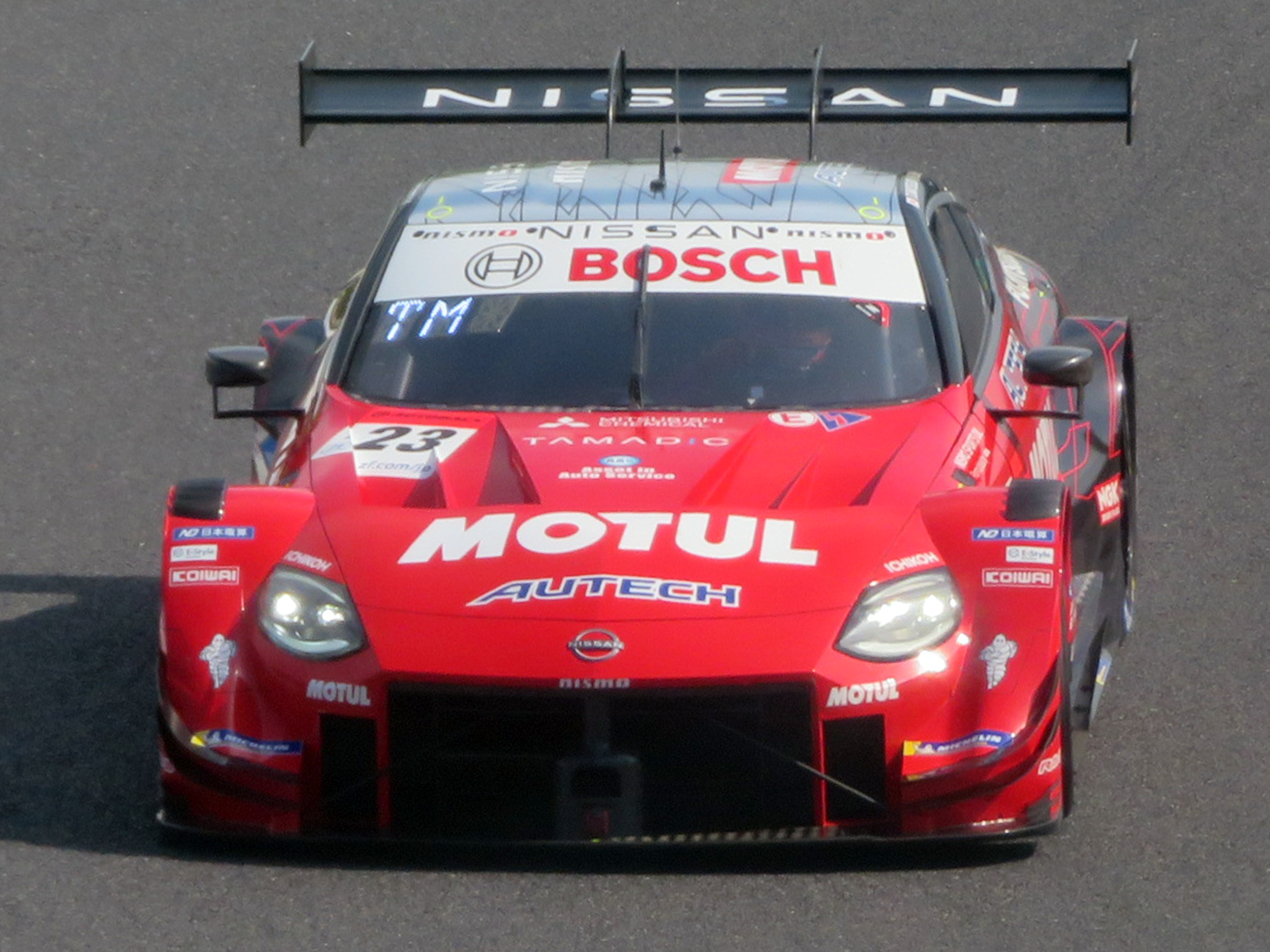
Matsuda driving the number 23 Motul Autech Nissan Z GT500 in 2022.

While the Nissan GT-R languished behind its rivals from Toyota and Honda over the ensuing years, Matsuda and Quintarelli continued to fight for wins and championships. They finished second in the 2017 championship, and third in 2019 despite not winning any races. Matsuda became the first GT500 driver to win 20 races at the 2018 Fuji 500 km. The duo swept both 300 km races at Suzuka during the 2020 season, and in 2021, Matsuda won his 23rd career race in car number 23, while NISMO won its third straight race at Suzuka.

At the third round of the 2023 season in Suzuka, Matsuda was involved in a multi-car accident that saw his car spin off at 130R, get airborne, and crash into the protective catch fence. Matsuda escaped serious injuries. He won the season-opening race at Okayama and finished second at Sugo and Motegi, and finished third in points.

After ten years at NISMO alongside Quintarelli, Matsuda was moved to Kondo Racing for the 2024 season, where he is set to join GT500 rookie Teppei Natori.

=== International sports car racing ===
Matsuda's affiliation with KCMG and Nissan eventually led him to his first opportunities to race in the FIA World Endurance Championship. His first start in the series was at the rain-shortened 2013 6 Hours of Fuji, driving a Morgan LMP2. He made two more starts in 2014, aboard the team's new Oreca 03. He finished second in class at the 6 Hours of Silverstone, and captured his first LMP2 class win at the 2014 6 Hours of Circuit of the Americas.

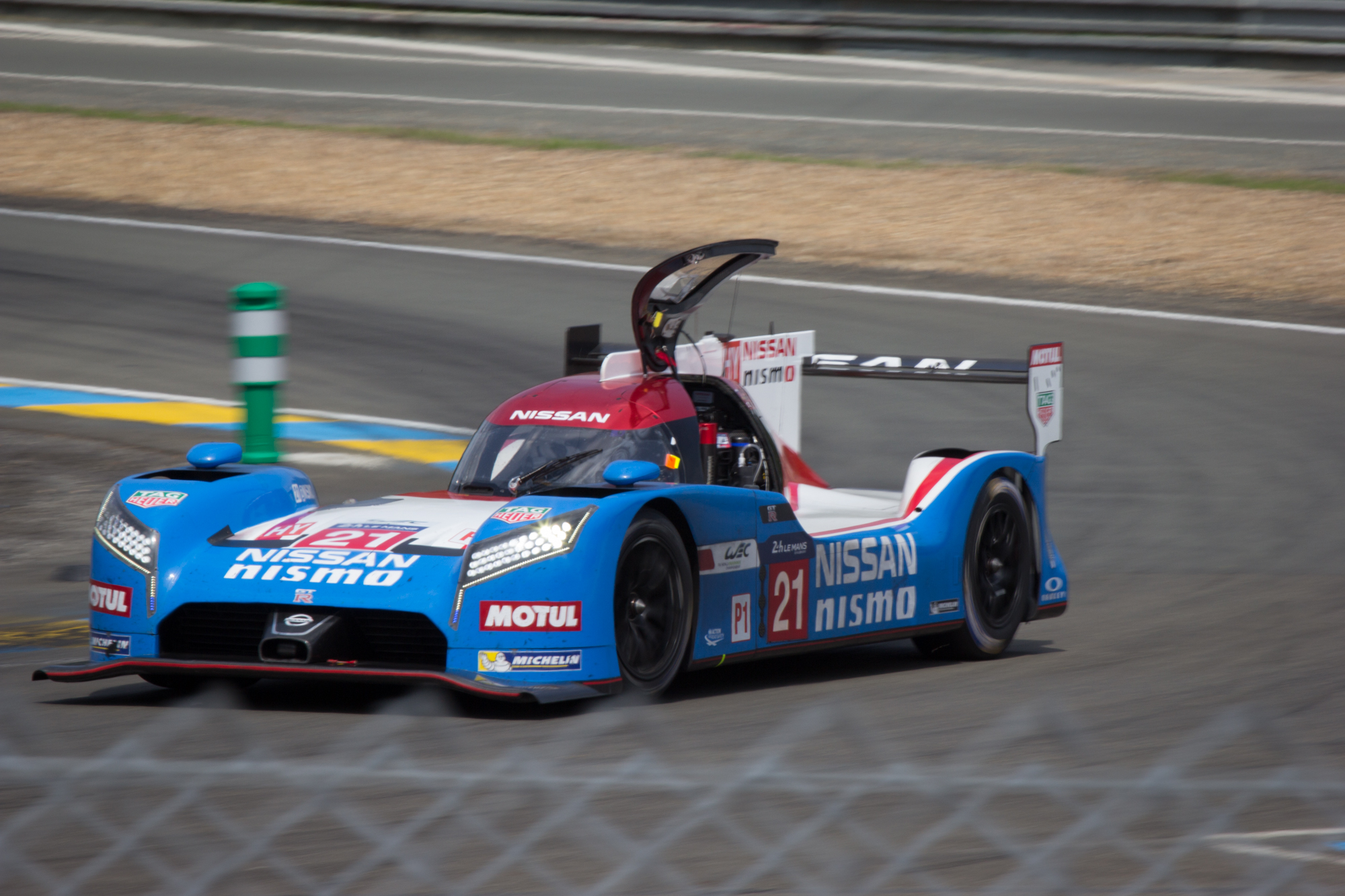
Matsuda made his first start at the 24 Hours of Le Mans in the number 21 Nissan GT-R LM Nismo.

As a reward for winning the GT500 championship in Super GT the previous year, Matsuda earned a drive in the new Nissan GT-R LM Nismo LMP1 car at the 2015 24 Hours of Le Mans. Sharing the car with GT Academy graduates Lucas Ordoñez and Mark Shulzhitskiy, Matsuda's race ended after 115 laps due to a terminal suspension failure. It would be Matsuda's only LMP1 appearance following the collapse of the ill-fated GT-R LM Nismo project.

However, Matsuda would return to Le Mans in 2016, this time driving for KCMG, now the reigning LMP2 race winners, in their new Oreca 05. Unfortunately, Matsuda's second outing at Le Mans also ended before the chequered flag when the number 47 Oreca suffered multiple mechanical failures including a power steering failure which ultimately ended the race for Matsuda, Richard Bradley, and Matthew Howson.

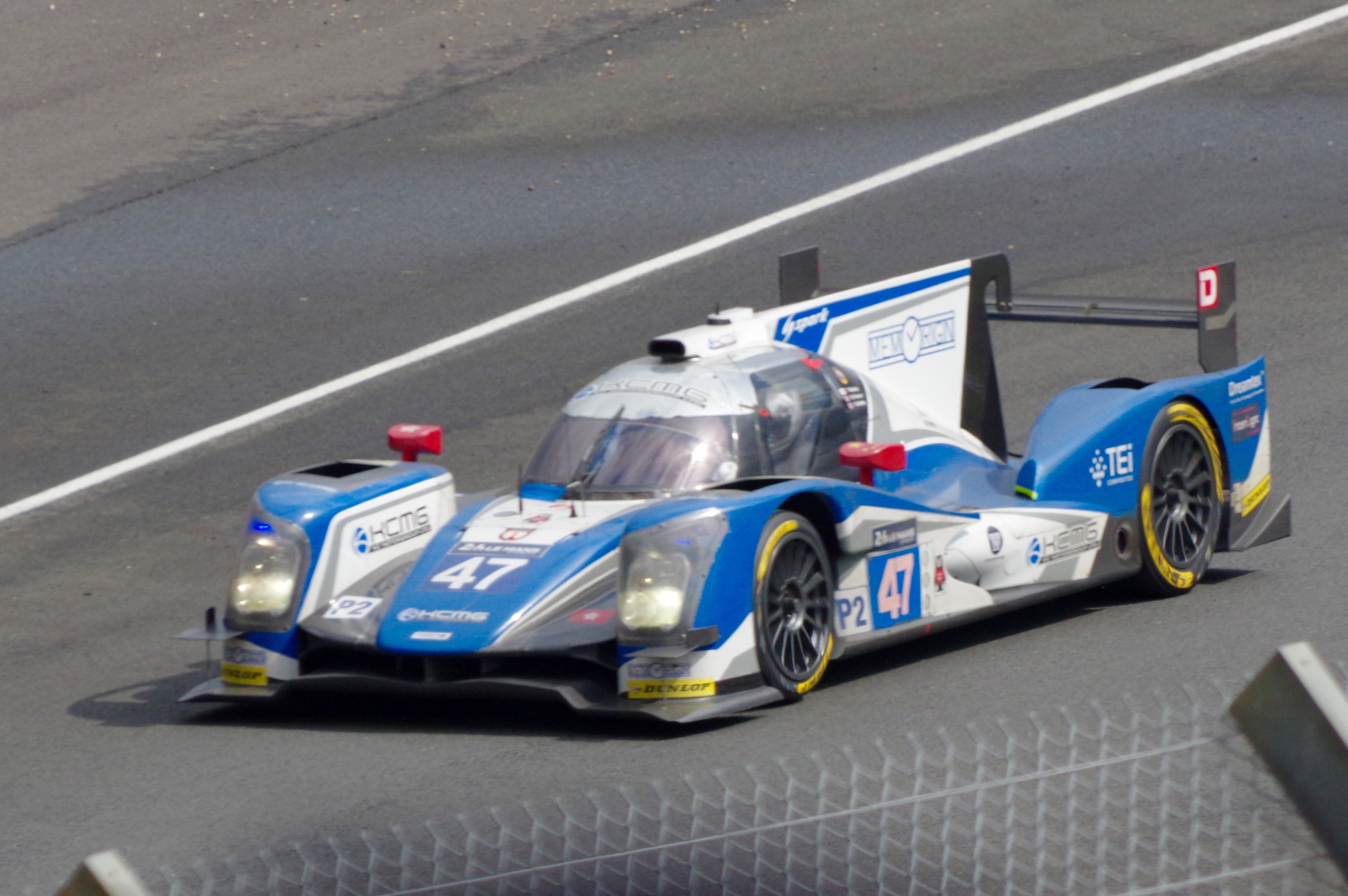
Matsuda returned to Le Mans in 2016 driving an LMP2 Oreca 05 for KCMG.

KCMG began a customer racing programme with the new Nissan GT-R NISMO GT3 in 2018 and recruited Matsuda as one of its drivers. He raced part-time in GT World Challenge Asia alongside Yukinori Taniguchi, and drove for KCMG in the inaugural Suzuka 10 Hours, the successor to the Suzuka 1000 km. He also returned to Macau for the first time in nearly 20 years, taking part in the FIA GT World Cup race.

Matsuda's international racing in 2019 included first appearances in the Bathurst 12 Hour, 24 Hours of Spa, and Dubai 24 Hour with KCMG, and the 24 Hours of Nürburgring with Kondo Racing, where he finished ninth overall. He also returned to the Suzuka 10 Hours and finished sixth overall. Matsuda appeared as a guest driver in the 2019 DTM championship finale at Hockenheimring, driving a Nissan GT-R NISMO GT500 in advance of the upcoming Super GT x DTM Dream Race at Fuji.

Due to the influence of the COVID-19 pandemic limiting travel into and out of Japan for an extended period of time, and the gradual shuttering of Nissan's GT3 racing activities outside of Japan, Matsuda's last race abroad was the 2020 Bathurst 12 Hour - but his car was withdrawn from the race after an incident in the first practice session.

== Racing record ==
=== Complete Japanese Formula 3 Championship results ===
(key) (Races in bold indicate pole position) (Races in italics indicate fastest lap)

Year	Team	Engine	1	2	3	4	5	6	7	8	9	10	DC	Pts
1998	Nakajima Racing	Mugen	SUZ; 5	TSU	MIN; 6	FUJ; 6	MOT; 1	SUZ	SUG; 3	TAI; 8	SEN; 18	SUG; 11	4th	17
1999	Nakajima Racing	Mugen	SUZ; 9	TSU; 7	FUJ; 2	MIN; Ret	FUJ; 4	SUZ; 3	SUG; 3	TAI; 5	MOT; 3	SUZ	5th	23

=== Complete Formula Nippon/Super Formula results ===
(key) (Races in bold indicate pole position) (Races in italics indicate fastest lap)

Year	Team	Engine	1	2	3	4	5	6	7	8	9	10	11	DC	Points
1998	PIAA Nakajima Racing	Honda	SUZ	MIN	FUJ	MOT	SUZ; 6	SUG	FUJ	MIN	FUJ	SUZ		15th	1
2000	PIAA Nakajima Racing	Mugen	SUZ; 12	MOT; 3	MIN; 1	FUJ; 16	SUZ; 5	SUG; 11	MOT; 4	FUJ; Ret	MIN; 3	SUZ; 3		4th	27
2001	PIAA Nakajima Racing	Mugen	SUZ; Ret	MOT; 3	MIN; 8	FUJ; Ret	SUZ; 5	SUG; 5	FUJ; Ret	MIN; Ret	MOT; 9	**SUZ**; 9		10th	8
2002	PIAA Nakajima Racing	Mugen	SUZ; 3	FUJ; 10	MIN; 2	SUZ; Ret	MOT; 13	SUG; 5	FUJ; Ret	MIN; 4	MOT; 4	SUZ; 6		5th	19
2003	Cosmo Oil Racing Team Cerumo	Mugen	SUZ; 5	FUJ; 9	MIN; Ret	MOT; Ret	SUZ; 15	SUG; 6	FUJ; 5	MIN; 5	MOT; 14	SUZ; Ret		11th	7
2004	Cosmo Oil Racing Team Cerumo	Mugen	SUZ; 4	SUG; Ret	MOT; 12	SUZ; 9	SUG; DSQ	MIN; 12	SEP; 4	MOT; 6	SUZ; Ret			9th	7
2005	Team 5ZIGEN	Mugen	MOT; 10	SUZ; 2	SUG; Ret	FUJ; 3	SUZ; 6	MIN; 4	FUJ; 9	MOT; 10	SUZ; 8			6th	14
2006	mobilecast Team Impul	Toyota	FUJ; 2	SUZ; 9	MOT; 5	SUZ; 2	AUT; 1	FUJ; 7	SUG; 3	MOT; 2	**SUZ**; 2			**2nd**	**37**
2007	mobilecast Team Impul	Toyota	FUJ; 2	**SUZ**; 2	**MOT**; 3	OKA; 3	**SUZ**; 4	FUJ; 13	SUG; 5	MOT; 5	SUZ; 4			**1st**	**46**
2008	Lawson Team Impul	Toyota	**FUJ**; 1	**SUZ**; 1	**MOT**; 1	**OKA**; Ret	**SUZ**; 1	SUZ; 8	**MOT**; 2	MOT; 2	FUJ; 4	FUJ; 5	SUG; 1	**1st**	**93.5**
2009	Lawson Team Impul	Toyota	FUJ; Ret	SUZ; Ret	MOT; 6	FUJ; Ret	SUZ; 12	MOT; 5	AUT; 7	SUG; 7				11th	11
2010	Kondo Racing	Toyota	SUZ	MOT	FUJ	MOT; Ret	SUG; 8	AUT; Ret	SUZ; 14	SUZ; 9				15th	1
2012	Team Impul	Toyota	SUZ; 8	MOT; 6	AUT; 4	FUJ; 5	MOT; 7	SUG; Ret	**SUZ**; 2	SUZ; Ret				8th	20
2013	Lenovo Team Impul	Toyota	SUZ; 2	AUT; 5	FUJ; 16	MOT; 13	SUG; 5	**SUZ**; 4	SUZ; 16					6th	18.5

=== Complete JGTC/Super GT results ===
(key) (Races in bold indicate pole position) (Races in italics indicate fastest lap)

Year	Team	Car	Class	1	2	3	4	5	6	7	8	9	DC	Points
2000	Team Take One	McLaren F1 GTR	GT500	MOT	FUJ	SUG	FUJ	TAI; 4	MIN; Ret	SUZ; Ret			19th	10
2001	Mobil 1 Nakajima Racing	Honda NSX	GT500	TAI; 3	FUJ; 12	SUG; 14	FUJ; 6	**MOT**; 1	SUZ; Ret	MIN; Ret			8th	38
2002	Mobil 1 Nakajima Racing	Honda NSX	GT500	**TAI**; 1	FUJ; 11	SUG; Ret	**SEP**; 1	FUJ; 12	MOT; 14	**MIN**; 6	SUZ; 1		2nd	74
2003	Mobil 1 Nakajima Racing	Honda NSX	GT500	TAI; 5	FUJ; 6	SUG; 8	FUJ; 13	FUJ; 9	MOT; Ret	AUT; 2	SUZ; 12		11th	36
2004	Epson Nakajima Racing	Honda NSX	GT500	TAI; 10	SUG; 4	SEP; 9	TOK; 6	MOT; 1	AUT; 12	SUZ; 5			8th	42
2005	Epson Nakajima Racing	Honda NSX	GT500	OKA; 5	FUJ; 8	SEP; 5	SUG; 13	MOT; 10	**FUJ**; 2	AUT; 14	SUZ; 10		9th	38
2006	NISMO	Nissan Z	GT500	SUZ; 2	OKA; Ret	FUJ; 4	SEP; 5	SUG; 2	SUZ; DSQ	MOT; 14	AUT; 1	FUJ; 11	6th	69
2007	NISMO	Nissan Z	GT500	SUZ; 5	OKA; 3	FUJ; 2	SEP; 10	SUG; Ret	SUZ; 6	MOT; 2	AUT; 4	FUJ; 9	5th	63
2008	Team Impul	Nissan GT-R	GT500	SUZ; Ret	OKA; 2	FUJ; 9	SEP; 14	SUG	SUZ; 1	MOT; 11	AUT; 10	FUJ; 1	5th	61
2009	Team Impul	Nissan GT-R	GT500	OKA; 4	SUZ; 3	FUJ; 15	SEP; 7	SUG; 8	SUZ; 5	FUJ; 15	AUT; Ret	MOT; 7	11th	36
2010	Team Impul	Nissan GT-R	GT500	SUZ; Ret	OKA; 4	FUJ; 6	**SEP**; 1	SUG; 4	SUZ; 12	FUJ; C	MOT; 5		5th	47
2011	Team Impul	Nissan GT-R	GT500	OKA; 1	FUJ; 14	SEP; 15	SUG; 13	SUZ; 3	FUJ; 2	AUT; 10	MOT; 9		5th	49
2012	Team Impul	Nissan GT-R	GT500	OKA; 10	FUJ; 5	SEP; 5	SUG; Ret	SUZ; 4	**FUJ**; 1	AUT; 10	MOT; 10		4th	45
2013	Team Impul	Nissan GT-R	GT500	OKA; 6	FUJ; 5	**SEP**; 1	SUG; Ret	SUZ; 4	FUJ; 6	AUT; Ret	MOT; 13		9th	46
2014	NISMO	Nissan GT-R	GT500	OKA; 7	FUJ; 8	**AUT**; 1	SUG; 14	FUJ; 2	SUZ; 2	BUR; 10	**MOT**; 1		1st	81
2015	NISMO	Nissan GT-R	GT500	OKA; 13	FUJ; 1	**CHA**; 5	FUJ; 4	SUZ; 7	SUG; 6	**AUT**; 1	**MOT**; 2		1st	79
2016	NISMO	Nissan GT-R	GT500	OKA; 1	FUJ; 1	SUG; 9	FUJ; 4	SUZ; 6	CHA; 14	MOT; 9	MOT; 7		3rd	62
2017	NISMO	Nissan GT-R	GT500	OKA; 7	FUJ; 4	AUT; 5	SUG; 4	FUJ; 2	SUZ; 2	CHA; 9	**MOT**; 1		2nd	82
2018	NISMO	Nissan GT-R	GT500	OKA; 5	FUJ; 1	SUZ; 6	CHA; 12	**FUJ**; 9	SUG; 7	AUT; 15	MOT; 7		8th	43
2019	NISMO	Nissan GT-R	GT500	**OKA**; 2‡	**FUJ**; 2	SUZ; Ret	CHA; 11	**FUJ**; 3	AUT; 13	SUG; 3	MOT; 8		3rd	52.5
2020	NISMO	Nissan GT-R Nismo	GT500	FUJ; 11	FUJ; 9	SUZ; 1	MOT; 8	FUJ; 11	SUZ; 1	MOT; 7	FUJ; 9		6th	51
2021	NISMO	Nissan GT-R Nismo	GT500	OKA; Ret	FUJ; Ret	MOT; 9	SUZ; 1	SUG; 7	AUT; 3	MOT; 15	FUJ; 7		9th	41
2022	NISMO	Nissan Z GT500	GT500	OKA; 3	FUJ; 4‡	SUZ; 12	FUJ; 14	**SUZ**; 5	SUG; 2	AUT; 14	MOT; 13		7th	37
2023	NISMO	Nissan Z GT500	GT500	**OKA**; 1	FUJ; 7	SUZ; 13	FUJ; 13	SUZ; DSQ	SUG; 2	AUT; 10	MOT; 2		3rd	56
2024	Kondo Racing	Nissan Z GT500	GT500	OKA; 12	FUJ; 13	SUZ; 9	FUJ; 14	SUG; 13	**AUT**; 12†	MOT; 8	SUZ; 15		14th	8
2025	Kondo Racing	Nissan Z GT500	GT500	OKA; 11†	FUJ; 15	SEP; Ret	FS1; 12	FS2 (10)	SUZ; 13	SUG; 1	AUT; Ret	MOT; 10	14th	21.5

^{‡} Half points awarded as less than 75% of race distance was completed. ^{†} Driver did not finish, but was classified as he completed over 90% of the race distance. ^{(Number)} Driver did not take part in this sprint race, points are still awarded for the teammate's result.

=== Complete Asian Le Mans Series results ===
(key) (Races in bold indicate pole position) (Races in italics indicate fastest lap)

Year	Team	Car	Class	1	2	3	4	DC	Points
2013	KCMG	Morgan LMP2	LMP2	INJ	FSW	ZHU	**SEP**; 2	9th	19

=== Complete FIA World Endurance Championship results ===
(key) (Races in bold indicate pole position) (Races in italics indicate fastest lap)

Year	Team	Car	Class	1	2	3	4	5	6	7	8	DC	Pts
2013	KCMG	Morgan LMP2	LMP2	SIL	SPA	LMN	SAO	COA	FSW; 6	SHA	BHR	NC	0
2014	KCMG	Oreca 03 Oreca 03R	LMP2	SIL; 2	SPA	LMN	COA; 1	FSW	SHA	BHR	SAO	7th	43
2015	NISMO	Nissan GT-R LM Nismo	LMP1	SIL	SPA	LMN; Ret	NUR	COA	FSW	SHA	BHR	NC	0

=== 24 Hours of Le Mans results ===
Year	Team	Co-Drivers	Car	Class	Laps	Pos.	Class Pos.
2015	(Japan) Nissan Motorsports	(Russia) Mark Shulzhitskiy (Spain) Lucas Ordóñez	Nissan GT-R LM Nismo	LMP1	115	DNF	DNF
2016	(Hong Kong) KCMG	(United Kingdom) Richard Bradley (United Kingdom) Matthew Howson	Oreca 05-Nissan	LMP2	116	DNF	DNF

Sporting positions
Preceded by Benoît Tréluyer	Formula Nippon; Champion; 2007–2008	Succeeded by Loïc Duval
Preceded by Kohei Hirate; Yuji Tachikawa	Super GT; GT500 Champion; 2014–2015; With: Ronnie Quintarelli	Succeeded by Kohei Hirate; Heikki Kovalainen
