= 2003 Formula Nippon Championship =

The 2003 Formula Nippon Championship was the thirty-first season of premier Japanese single-seater racing, and the eighth under the Formula Nippon moniker. The series was contested over 10 races at five venues, including the final races at Fuji Speedway before a comprehensive renovation of the circuit began later that year.

10 different teams and 21 different drivers competed in the series. For the first time, the series adopted a spec chassis supplied by Lola, who replaced Reynard as the series' chassis supplier.

Satoshi Motoyama of Team Impul won his third series championship, becoming only the third driver after Kazuyoshi Hoshino and Satoru Nakajima to win three or more championships in Japanese top formula racing. Motoyama also became the second driver to win both the Formula Nippon and All-Japan Grand Touring Car GT500 Championships in the same year.

== Teams and drivers ==
All teams used tyres supplied by Bridgestone, Lola B03/51 chassis, and Mugen MF308 engines.

Team	#	Driver	Rounds
PIAA Nakajima Racing	1	(Japan) Takashi Kogure	All
PIAA Nakajima Racing	2	(Germany) André Lotterer	All
Olympic Kondo Racing Team	3	(Japan) Yuji Tachikawa	All
Olympic Kondo Racing Team	4	(Germany) Dominik Schwager	All
Team 5ZIGEN	5	(Japan) Ryō Michigami	All
Team 5ZIGEN	6	(Japan) Ryo Fukuda	1–5
Team 5ZIGEN	6	(Australia) James Courtney	7–10
Forum Engineering ARTA Team LeMans	7	(Japan) Toshihiro Kaneishi	All
Forum Engineering ARTA Team LeMans	8	(Japan) Takeshi Tsuchiya	All
Planex EBBRO Nova; Kacchao TCPRO Nova; Team Nova; Oizumi Team Nova	9	(Japan) Haruki Kurosawa	All
Planex EBBRO Nova; Kacchao TCPRO Nova; Team Nova; Oizumi Team Nova	10	(Japan) Tetsuya Fujisawa	1–4
Planex EBBRO Nova; Kacchao TCPRO Nova; Team Nova; Oizumi Team Nova	10	(Japan) Yudai Igarashi	5–7
Planex EBBRO Nova; Kacchao TCPRO Nova; Team Nova; Oizumi Team Nova	10	(Japan) Hiroki Katoh	8–10
Cosmo Oil Racing Team Cerumo	11	(Japan) Tsugio Matsuda	All
Cosmo Oil Racing Team Cerumo	12	(Japan) Yuji Ide	All
Team Impul	19	(Japan) Satoshi Motoyama	All
Team Impul	20	(France) Benoît Tréluyer	All
Team 22	22	(Japan) Juichi Wakisaka	All
Carrozzeria Team MOHN	28	(Japan) Hideki Noda	All
DoCoMo Team Dandelion Racing	40	(United Kingdom) Richard Lyons	All
DoCoMo Team Dandelion Racing	41	(Japan) Naoki Hattori	All

== Race calendar and results ==
All races were held in Japan.

Race	Track	Date	Pole position	Fastest race lap	Winning driver	Winning team
1	Suzuka Circuit	23 March	(Japan) Ryō Michigami	(United Kingdom) Richard Lyons	(Japan) Satoshi Motoyama	Team Impul
2	Fuji Speedway	6 April	(Japan) Satoshi Motoyama	(Japan) Takeshi Tsuchiya	(Japan) Satoshi Motoyama	Team Impul
3	Mine Circuit	27 April	(Japan) Satoshi Motoyama	(Japan) Yuji Tachikawa	(Japan) Satoshi Motoyama	Team Impul
4	Twin Ring Motegi	8 June	(Japan) Juichi Wakisaka	(Japan) Satoshi Motoyama	(Japan) Juichi Wakisaka	Team 22
5	Suzuka Circuit	6 July	(United Kingdom) Richard Lyons	(Japan) Satoshi Motoyama	(United Kingdom) Richard Lyons	DoCoMo Team Dandelion Racing
6	Sportsland SUGO	27 July	(Germany) André Lotterer	(Japan) Satoshi Motoyama	(Japan) Satoshi Motoyama	Team Impul
7	Fuji Speedway	31 August	(Japan) Satoshi Motoyama	(Japan) Satoshi Motoyama	(France) Benoît Tréluyer	Team Impul
8	Mine Circuit	21 September	(Japan) Satoshi Motoyama	(Japan) Satoshi Motoyama	(France) Benoît Tréluyer	Team Impul
9	Twin Ring Motegi	19 October	(Japan) Toshihiro Kaneishi	(Japan) Takeshi Tsuchiya	(Japan) Toshihiro Kaneishi	Forum Engineering ARTA Team LeMans
10	Suzuka Circuit	2 November	(Japan) Satoshi Motoyama	(United Kingdom) Richard Lyons	(Japan) Juichi Wakisaka	Team 22

- For Round 5, an 18-lap (104.526 km) sprint race set the grid for the main race. The sprint race winner Richard Lyons started from pole in the main race. Takeshi Tsuchiya set pole position for the sprint race.

== Championship standings ==
=== Drivers' Championship ===
Scoring system

Position	1st	2nd	3rd	4th	5th	6th
Points	10	6	4	3	2	1

Rank	Name	SUZ	FUJ	MIN	MOT	SUZ	SGO	FUJ	MIN	MOT	SUZ	Points
1	(Japan) Satoshi Motoyama	1	1	1	9	14	1	2	13	2	3	56
2	(France) Benoît Tréluyer	Ret	2	Ret	NC	2	4	1	1	9	Ret	35
3	(Japan) Juichi Wakisaka	Ret	5	Ret	1	3	3	Ret	6	Ret	1	31
4	(Japan) Toshihiro Kaneishi	3	8	5	7	Ret	8	Ret	2	1	Ret	22
5	(Germany) André Lotterer	2	4	7	6	Ret	2	3	9	5	Ret	22
6	(United Kingdom) Richard Lyons	9	Ret	Ret	3	1	5	Ret	Ret	3	9	20
7	(Japan) Yuji Ide	4	7	3	2	7	10	Ret	3	12	5	19
8	(Japan) Takeshi Tsuchiya	Ret	NC	2	4	5	7	6	12	6	4	16
9	(Japan) Ryō Michigami	Ret	3	4	5	4	NC	Ret	NC	13	6	13
10	(Japan) Takashi Kogure	12	6	Ret	DNS	6	Ret	Ret	14	4	2	11
11	(Japan) Tsugio Matsuda	5	9	Ret	Ret	15	6	5	5	14	Ret	7
12	(Australia) James Courtney							4	7	Ret	Ret	3
13	(Japan) Naoki Hattori	8	Ret	Ret	11	8	9	9	4	7	11	3
14	(Japan) Hideki Noda	6	10	8	DNS	12	Ret	Ret	10	Ret	10	1
15	(Japan) Ryo Fukuda	7	Ret	6	Ret	13						1
16	(Germany) Dominik Schwager	Ret	Ret	Ret	8	9	11	7	8	10	8	0
17	(Japan) Hiroki Katoh								Ret	11	7	0
18	(Japan) Yuji Tachikawa	10	12	10	Ret	Ret	NC	Ret	Ret	8	Ret	0
19	(Japan) Haruki Kurosawa	Ret	Ret	9	10	11	Ret	Ret	11	Ret	Ret	0
20	(Japan) Yudai Igarashi					10	12	Ret				0
21	(Japan) Tetsuya Fujisawa	11	11	Ret	12							0

=== Teams' Championship ===
Rank	Team	Car	SUZ	FUJ	MIN	MOT	SUZ	SGO	FUJ	MIN	MOT	SUZ	Points
1	Impul	19	1	1	1	9	14	1	2	13	2	3	91
1	Impul	20	Ret	2	Ret	NC	2	4	1	1	9	Ret	91
2	Team LeMans	7	3	8	5	7	Ret	8	Ret	2	1	Ret	38
2	Team LeMans	8	Ret	NC	2	4	5	7	6	12	6	4	38
3	PIAA Nakajima	1	12	6	Ret	DNS	6	Ret	Ret	14	4	2	33
3	PIAA Nakajima	2	2	4	7	6	Ret	2	3	9	5	Ret	33
4	Team 22	22	Ret	5	Ret	1	3	3	Ret	6	Ret	1	31
5	Cosmo Oil Cerumo	11	5	9	Ret	Ret	15	6	5	5	14	Ret	23
5	Cosmo Oil Cerumo	12	4	7	3	2	7	10	Ret	3	12	5	23
6	DoCoMo Dandelion	40	9	Ret	Ret	3	1	5	Ret	Ret	3	9	23
6	DoCoMo Dandelion	41	8	Ret	Ret	11	8	9	9	4	7	11	23
7	5ZIGEN	5	Ret	3	4	5	4	NC	Ret	NC	13	6	17
7	5ZIGEN	6	7	Ret	6	Ret	13		4	7	Ret	Ret	17
8	Team MOHN	28	6	10	8	DNS	12	Ret	Ret	10	Ret	10	1
9	Team Nova	9	Ret	Ret	9	10	11	Ret	Ret	11	Ret	Ret	0
9	Team Nova	10	11	11	Ret	12	10	12	Ret	Ret	11	7	0
10	Kondo Racing Team	3	10	12	10	Ret	Ret	NC	Ret	Ret	8	Ret	0
10	Kondo Racing Team	4	Ret	Ret	Ret	8	9	11	7	8	10	8	0
