= 2000 Formula Nippon Championship =

The 2000 Formula Nippon Championship was the twenty-eighth season of premier Japanese single-seater racing, and the fifth under the Formula Nippon name and Japan Race Promotion (JRP) management. The series was contested over ten rounds at five venues. 13 different teams, 21 different drivers, and two different chassis suppliers competed in the series.

Nakajima Racing driver Toranosuke Takagi, who returned to Formula Nippon after two seasons in Formula One, won his first series championship and set a new single-season record with eight wins. Takagi moved to the CART Championship Series the following year.

== Teams and drivers ==
All teams used tyres supplied by Bridgestone and Mugen MF308 engines.

Team	#	Driver	Chassis	Rounds
PIAA Nakajima Racing	0	(Japan) Toranosuke Takagi	Reynard 2KL	All
PIAA Nakajima Racing	2	(Japan) Tsugio Matsuda	Reynard 99L	All
Olympic Kondo Racing Team	3	(Japan) Masahiko Kondo	Reynard 99L	All
Olympic Kondo Racing Team	4	(Japan) Takeshi Tsuchiya	G-Force GF03	9
Team 5ZIGEN	5	(Japan) Naoki Hattori	Reynard 99L	All
Team 5ZIGEN	6	(Germany) Michael Krumm	Reynard 99L	All
Team LeMans	7	(Japan) Hideki Noda	Reynard 99L	All
Team LeMans	8	(Japan) Yudai Igarashi	Reynard 99L	All
Team Morinaga Nova	9	(Republic of Ireland) Ralph Firman Jr.	G-Force GF03B	All
Team Morinaga Nova	10	(Japan) Koji Yamanishi	G-Force GF03B	All
Cosmo Oil Racing Team Cerumo	11	(Japan) Yuji Tachikawa	Reynard 99L	All
Cosmo Oil Racing Team Cerumo	12	(Poland) Jaroslaw Wierczuk	Reynard 99L	All
Mooncraft	14	(Japan) Shigekazu Wakisaka	Reynard 99L	All
Team Impul	19	(Japan) Satoshi Motoyama	Reynard 99L	All
Team Malaysia	21	(Malaysia) Alex Yoong	Reynard 99L	All
Takagi B-1 Racing	36	(Japan) Tetsuji Tamanaka	Reynard 99L	All
Autobacs Racing Team Aguri	55	(Japan) Katsutomo Kaneishi	Reynard 99L	1–8
Autobacs Racing Team Aguri	56	(Japan) Juichi Wakisaka	Reynard 99L	All
Team LeyJun	62	(Japan) Shinsuke Shibahara	Reynard 2KL	All
Team LeyJun	63	(Japan) "Osamu"	Reynard 99L; G-Force GF03	1–5, 7–10
DoCoMo Team Dandelion Racing	68	(Japan) Ryō Michigami	Reynard 2KL	All

== Race calendar and results ==
All races were held in Japan.

Race	Track	Date	Pole position	Fastest Race Lap	Winning driver	Winning team
1	Suzuka Circuit	26 March	(Republic of Ireland) Ralph Firman Jr.	(Japan) Toranosuke Takagi	(Japan) Toranosuke Takagi	PIAA Nakajima Racing
2	Twin Ring Motegi	16 April	(Japan) Toranosuke Takagi	(Japan) Tsugio Matsuda	(Japan) Toranosuke Takagi	PIAA Nakajima Racing
3	Mine Circuit	21 May	(Japan) Toranosuke Takagi	(Japan) Toranosuke Takagi	(Japan) Tsugio Matsuda	PIAA Nakajima Racing
4	Fuji Speedway	4 June	(Germany) Michael Krumm	(Japan) Hideki Noda	(Japan) Toranosuke Takagi	PIAA Nakajima Racing
5	Suzuka-East Circuit	2 July	(Japan) Toranosuke Takagi	(Japan) Toranosuke Takagi	(Japan) Toranosuke Takagi	PIAA Nakajima Racing
6	Sportsland SUGO	30 July	(Japan) Toranosuke Takagi	(Japan) Juichi Wakisaka	(Japan) Toranosuke Takagi	PIAA Nakajima Racing
7	Twin Ring Motegi	20 August	(Japan) Toranosuke Takagi	(Germany) Michael Krumm	(Japan) Toranosuke Takagi	PIAA Nakajima Racing
8	Fuji Speedway	3 September	(Japan) Satoshi Motoyama	(Japan) Hideki Noda	(Japan) Toranosuke Takagi	PIAA Nakajima Racing
9	Mine Circuit	17 September	(Japan) Toranosuke Takagi	(Japan) Satoshi Motoyama	(Japan) Toranosuke Takagi	PIAA Nakajima Racing
10	Suzuka Circuit	5 November	(Japan) Satoshi Motoyama	(Japan) Satoshi Motoyama	(Japan) Satoshi Motoyama	Team Impul

Notes:

- Race 1 stopped due to rain and restarted, originally scheduled over 35 laps.
- Race 8 stopped due to an accident and restarted, originally scheduled over 50 laps.

== Championship standings ==
=== Drivers' Championship ===
Scoring system

Position	1st	2nd	3rd	4th	5th	6th
Points	10	6	4	3	2	1

Rank	Name	SUZ	MOT	MIN	FUJ	SUZ	SGO	MOT	FUJ	MIN	SUZ	Points
1	(Japan) Toranosuke Takagi	1	1	Ret	1	1	1	1	1	1	2	86
2	(Germany) Michael Krumm	2	2	2	Ret	3	5	2	5	Ret	4	35
3	(Japan) Satoshi Motoyama	6	4	Ret	8	6	4	3	2	2	1	34
4	(Japan) Tsugio Matsuda	12	3	1	Ret	5	11	4	Ret	3	3	27
5	(Japan) Hideki Noda	Ret	10	3	15	2	Ret	5	6	17	5	15
6	(Japan) Katsutomo Kaneishi	4	6	5	3	Ret	3	11	Ret			14
7	(Japan) Juichi Wakisaka	11	5	4	2	8	Ret	Ret	Ret	6	6	13
8	(Japan) Naoki Hattori	3	7	6	5	4	Ret	7	8	8	9	10
9	(Republic of Ireland) Ralph Firman Jr.	Ret	11	Ret	6	7	2	10	13	5	Ret	9
10	(Japan) Yuji Tachikawa	8	Ret	Ret	4	Ret	Ret	9	4	4	12	9
11	(Japan) Shinsuke Shibahara	9	12	9	7	9	6	Ret	3	13	14	5
12	(Japan) Shigekazu Wakisaka	5	8	Ret	Ret	Ret	8	13	9	Ret	8	2
13	(Japan) Yudai Igarashi	Ret	Ret	Ret	12	12	Ret	6	10	16	Ret	1
14	(Japan) Koji Yamanishi	Ret	9	7	11	14	Ret	Ret	Ret	7	7	0
15	(Japan) Masahiko Kondo	7	14	Ret	13	13	7	Ret	Ret	11	10	0
16	(Japan) Ryō Michigami	Ret	13	Ret	Ret	10	Ret	8	7	9	Ret	0
17	(Poland) Jaroslaw Wierczuk	13	Ret	8	Ret	Ret	Ret	12	11	12	11	0
18	(Malaysia) Alex Yoong	DNS	Ret	Ret	9	11	9	Ret	12	Ret	Ret	0
19	(Japan) Tetsuji Tamanaka	Ret	Ret	10	10	15	10	Ret	Ret	14	Ret	0
20	(Japan) "Osamu"	10	Ret	11	14	Ret		14	14	15	13	0
21	(Japan) Takeshi Tsuchiya									10		0

=== Teams' Championship ===
Rank	Name	Car	SUZ	MOT	MIN	FUJ	SUZ	SGO	MOT	FUJ	MIN	SUZ	Points
1	PIAA Nakajima	0	1	1	Ret	1	1	1	1	1	1	2	113
1	PIAA Nakajima	2	12	3	1	Ret	5	11	4	Ret	3	3	113
2	5ZIGEN	5	3	7	6	5	4	Ret	7	8	8	9	45
2	5ZIGEN	6	2	2	2	Ret	3	5	2	5	Ret	4	45
3	Impul	19	6	4	Ret	8	6	4	3	2	2	1	34
4	ARTA	55	4	6	5	3	Ret	3	11	Ret			27
4	ARTA	56	11	5	4	2	8	Ret	Ret	Ret	6	6	27
5	LeMans	7	Ret	10	3	15	2	Ret	5	6	17	5	16
5	LeMans	8	Ret	Ret	Ret	12	12	Ret	6	10	16	Ret	16
6	Team Morinaga Nova	9	Ret	11	Ret	6	7	2	10	13	5	Ret	9
6	Team Morinaga Nova	10	Ret	9	7	11	14	Ret	Ret	Ret	7	7	9
7	Cosmo Oil Cerumo	11	8	Ret	Ret	4	Ret	Ret	9	4	4	12	9
7	Cosmo Oil Cerumo	12	13	Ret	8	Ret	Ret	Ret	12	11	12	11	9
8	LeyJun	62	9	12	9	7	9	6	Ret	3	13	14	5
8	LeyJun	63	10	Ret	11	14	Ret		14	14	15	13	5
9	Mooncraft	14	5	8	Ret	Ret	Ret	8	13	9	Ret	8	2
10	Kondo Racing	3	7	14	Ret	13	13	7	Ret	Ret	11	10	0
10	Kondo Racing	4									10		0
11	DoCoMo Dandelion	68	Ret	13	Ret	Ret	10	Ret	8	7	9	Ret	0
12	Team Malaysia	21	DNS	Ret	Ret	9	11	9	Ret	12	Ret	Ret	0
13	Takagi B-1 Racing	36	Ret	Ret	10	10	15	10	Ret	Ret	14	Ret	0
