= 2005 Formula Nippon Championship =

Seasons
- ← 2004 2006 →

The 2005 Formula Nippon Championship was the thirty-third season of premier Japanese single-seater racing, and the tenth under the Formula Nippon moniker. It was contested over nine rounds at five venues. The newly renovated Fuji Speedway returned to the calendar, replacing Sepang International Circuit. Miné Circuit, which had been a staple venue of the series since 1977, closed for spectator events after 2005. Eight teams and 17 drivers competed in the series.

This would be the final season for Mugen as the sole engine supplier to Formula Nippon, with Toyota and Honda introducing new engines for the 2006 season.

Satoshi Motoyama of Team Impul won his fourth series championship, becoming the most successful driver of the "modern era" of Japanese top formula racing.

== Teams and drivers ==
All teams used tyres supplied by Bridgestone, Lola B03/51 chassis, and Mugen MF308 engines.

Team	#	Driver	Rounds
DoCoMo Team Dandelion Racing	1	(United Kingdom) Richard Lyons	All
DoCoMo Team Dandelion Racing	2	(Japan) Naoki Hattori	All
Kondo Racing Team	3	(Japan) Sakon Yamamoto	All
Kondo Racing Team	4	(Czech Republic) Jaroslav Janiš	1–3
Kondo Racing Team	4	(Italy) Ronnie Quintarelli	4–9
Team 5ZIGEN	5	(Japan) Tsugio Matsuda	All
Forum Engineering Team LeMans	7	(Japan) Tatsuya Kataoka	All
Forum Engineering Team LeMans	8	(Japan) Takeshi Tsuchiya	All
Team Cerumo; Takagi Planning with Cerumo	11	(Japan) Katsuyuki Hiranaka	All
Team Cerumo; Takagi Planning with Cerumo	12	(Japan) Toranosuke Takagi	All
mobilecast Team Impul	19	(France) Benoît Tréluyer	All
mobilecast Team Impul	20	(Japan) Yuji Ide	All
arting Racing Team with Impul	23	(Japan) Satoshi Motoyama	All
Carrozzeria Team MOHN	27	(Japan) Masanobu Kato	1
Carrozzeria Team MOHN	28	(Japan) Hideki Noda	All
PIAA Nakajima Racing	31	(Germany) André Lotterer	All
PIAA Nakajima Racing	32	(Japan) Takashi Kogure	All

== Race calendar and results ==
2005 venues

All races were held in Japan.

Round	Track	Date	Pole position	Fastest lap	Winner	Team
1	Twin Ring Motegi	3 April	(Japan) Yuji Ide	(Japan) Katsuyuki Hiranaka	(United Kingdom) Richard Lyons	DoCoMoTeam Dandelion Racing
2	Suzuka Circuit	17 April	(France) Benoît Tréluyer	(Japan) Takashi Kogure	(Japan) Yuji Ide	mobilecast Team Impul
3	Sportsland SUGO	15 May	(Japan) Takashi Kogure	(Japan) Hideki Noda	(Japan) Satoshi Motoyama	arting Team Impul
4	Fuji Speedway	5 June	(United Kingdom) Richard Lyons	(Japan) Tsugio Matsuda	(France) Benoît Tréluyer	mobilecast Team Impul
5	Suzuka Circuit	3 July	(Japan) Satoshi Motoyama	(Japan) Yuji Ide	(Japan) Satoshi Motoyama	arting Team Impul
6	Mine Circuit	31 July	(France) Benoît Tréluyer	(Japan) Yuji Ide	(Japan) Yuji Ide	mobilecast Team Impul
7	Fuji Speedway	28 August	(United Kingdom) Richard Lyons	(Japan) Satoshi Motoyama	(Germany) André Lotterer	Nakajima Racing
8	Twin Ring Motegi	23 October	(Japan) Satoshi Motoyama	(Japan) Sakon Yamamoto	(Japan) Satoshi Motoyama	arting Team Impul
9	Suzuka Circuit	27 November	(Japan) Tsugio Matsuda	(France) Benoît Tréluyer	(Germany) André Lotterer	PIAA Nakajima Racing

Calendar changes

- The race in Sepang International Circuit was dropped, while Fuji returned with two races.

== Championship standings ==
=== Drivers' Championship ===
Scoring system

Position	1st	2nd	3rd	4th	5th	6th
Points	10	6	4	3	2	1

Rank	Name	MOT	SUZ	SGO	FUJ	SUZ	MIN	FUJ	MOT	SUZ	Points
1	(Japan) Satoshi Motoyama	4	4	1	2	1	3	13	1	2	52
2	(Japan) Yuji Ide	2	1	5	7	8	1	3	4	3	39
3	(United Kingdom) Richard Lyons	1	5	2	4	3	Ret	4	13	5	30
4	(Germany) André Lotterer	11	Ret	9	Ret	Ret	10	1	Ret	1	20
5	(Japan) Takashi Kogure	Ret	3	3	8	2	Ret	11	9	6	15
6	(France) Benoît Tréluyer	6	9	Ret	1	Ret	Ret	12	11	4	14
7	(Japan) Tsugio Matsuda	10	2	Ret	3	6	4	9	10	8	14
8	(Japan) Takeshi Tsuchiya	5	Ret	4	Ret	Ret	5	5	3	Ret	13
9	(Italy) Ronnie Quintarelli				5	5	2	Ret	5	10	12
10	(Japan) Sakon Yamamoto	14	Ret	Ret	Ret	4	8	Ret	2	11	9
11	(Japan) Tatsuya Kataoka	7	8	8	Ret	Ret	7	2	6	7	7
12	(Japan) Naoki Hattori	3	6	6	10	7	6	7	7	14	7
13	(Japan) Katsuyuki Hiranaka	8	Ret	Ret	6	Ret	Ret	6	12	9	2
14	(Czech Republic) Jaroslav Janiš	12	7	7							0
15	(Japan) Toranosuke Takagi	9	Ret	11	9	10	9	8	Ret	12	0
16	(Japan) Hideki Noda	Ret	Ret	10	Ret	9	Ret	10	8	13	0
17	(Japan) Masanobu Kato	13									0

=== Teams' Championship ===
Rank	Team	Car	MOT	SUZ	SGO	FUJ	SUZ	MIN	FUJ	MOT	SUZ	Points
1	mobilecast Impul arting Impul	19	6	9	Ret	1	Ret	Ret	12	11	4	101
1	mobilecast Impul arting Impul	20	2	1	5	7	8	1	3	4	3	101
1	mobilecast Impul arting Impul	23	4	4	1	2	1	3	13	1	2	101
2	DoCoMo Dandelion	1	1	5	2	4	3	Ret	4	13	5	37
2	DoCoMo Dandelion	2	3	6	6	10	7	6	7	7	14	37
3	PIAA Nakajima	31	11	Ret	9	Ret	Ret	10	1	Ret	1	35
3	PIAA Nakajima	32	Ret	3	3	8	2	Ret	11	9	6	35
4	Kondo Racing Team	3	14	Ret	Ret	Ret	4	8	Ret	2	11	21
4	Kondo Racing Team	4	12	7	7	5	5	2	Ret	5	10	21
5	Team LeMans	7	7	8	8	Ret	Ret	7	2	6	7	20
5	Team LeMans	8	5	Ret	4	Ret	Ret	5	5	3	Ret	20
6	5ZIGEN	5	10	2	Ret	3	6	4	9	10	8	14
7	Cerumo	11	8	Ret	Ret	6	Ret	Ret	6	12	9	2
7	Cerumo	12	9	Ret	11	9	10	9	8	Ret	12	2
8	Team MOHN	27	13									0
8	Team MOHN	28	Ret	Ret	10	Ret	9	Ret	10	8	13	0
