= HKS (company) =

Publicly traded automotive accessories company headquartered in Fujinomiya, Japan

HKS Co. Ltd.

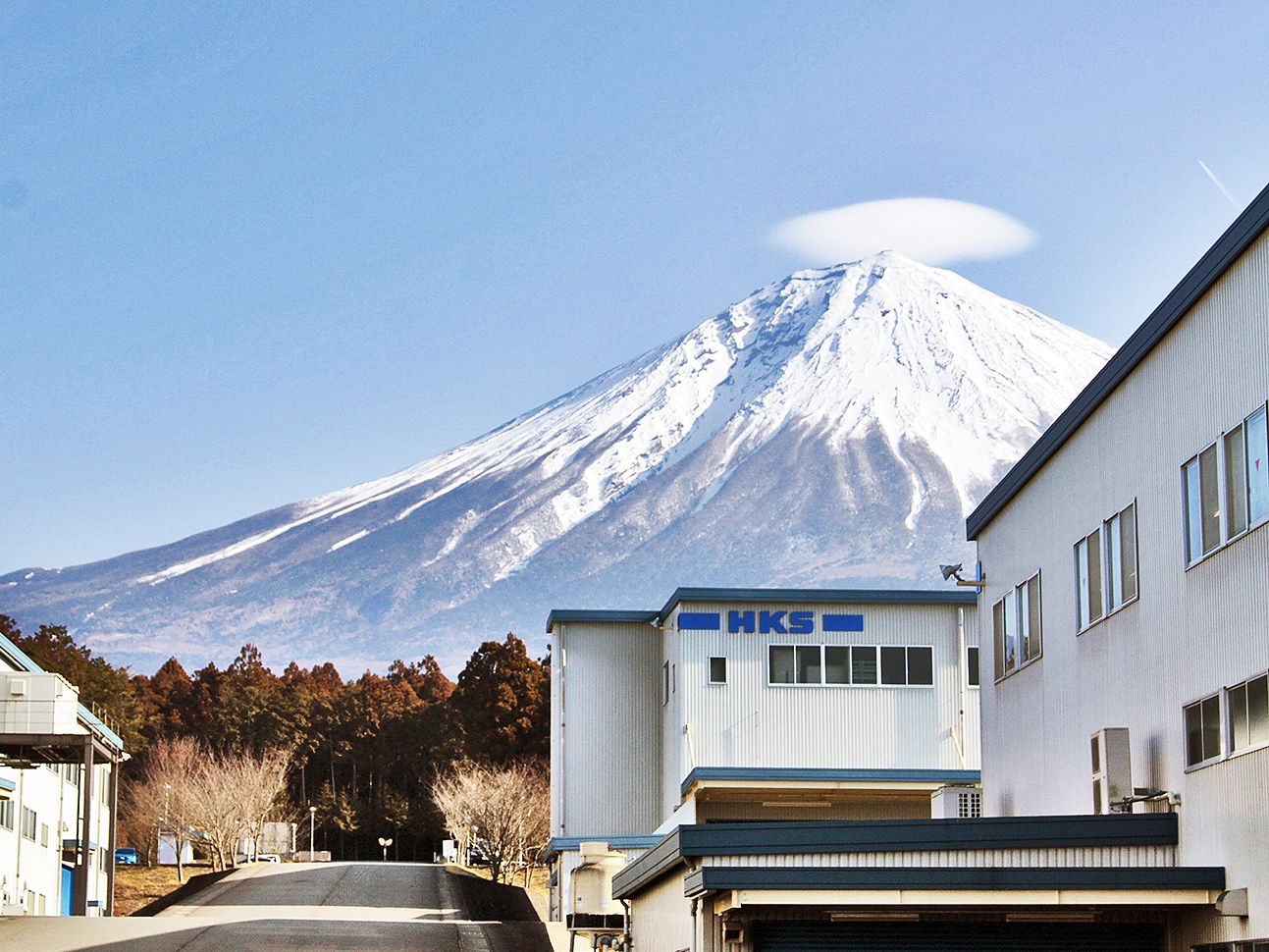
- HKS headquarters in Fujinomiya, Japan
- Type: Joint stock company
- Traded as: TYO: 7219
- Industry: Automotive, motorsport
- Founded: 1973
- Founder: Hiroyuki Hasegawa; Goichi Kitagawa
- Headquarters: Fujinomiya, Shizuoka, Japan
- Key people: Hiroyuki Hasegawa; Goichi Kitagawa; Daisuke Mizuguchi (President, 2016–)
- Products: Automotive accessories and tuning
- Revenue: ▲¥9.241 billion (2023)
- Operating income: ▲¥395 million (2025)
- Number of employees: 424 (2023)
- Subsidiaries: USA, Europe, Thailand, Shanghai, HKS Technical Factory, Nissei Kogyo Co., Ltd.
- Website: www.hks-power.co.jp

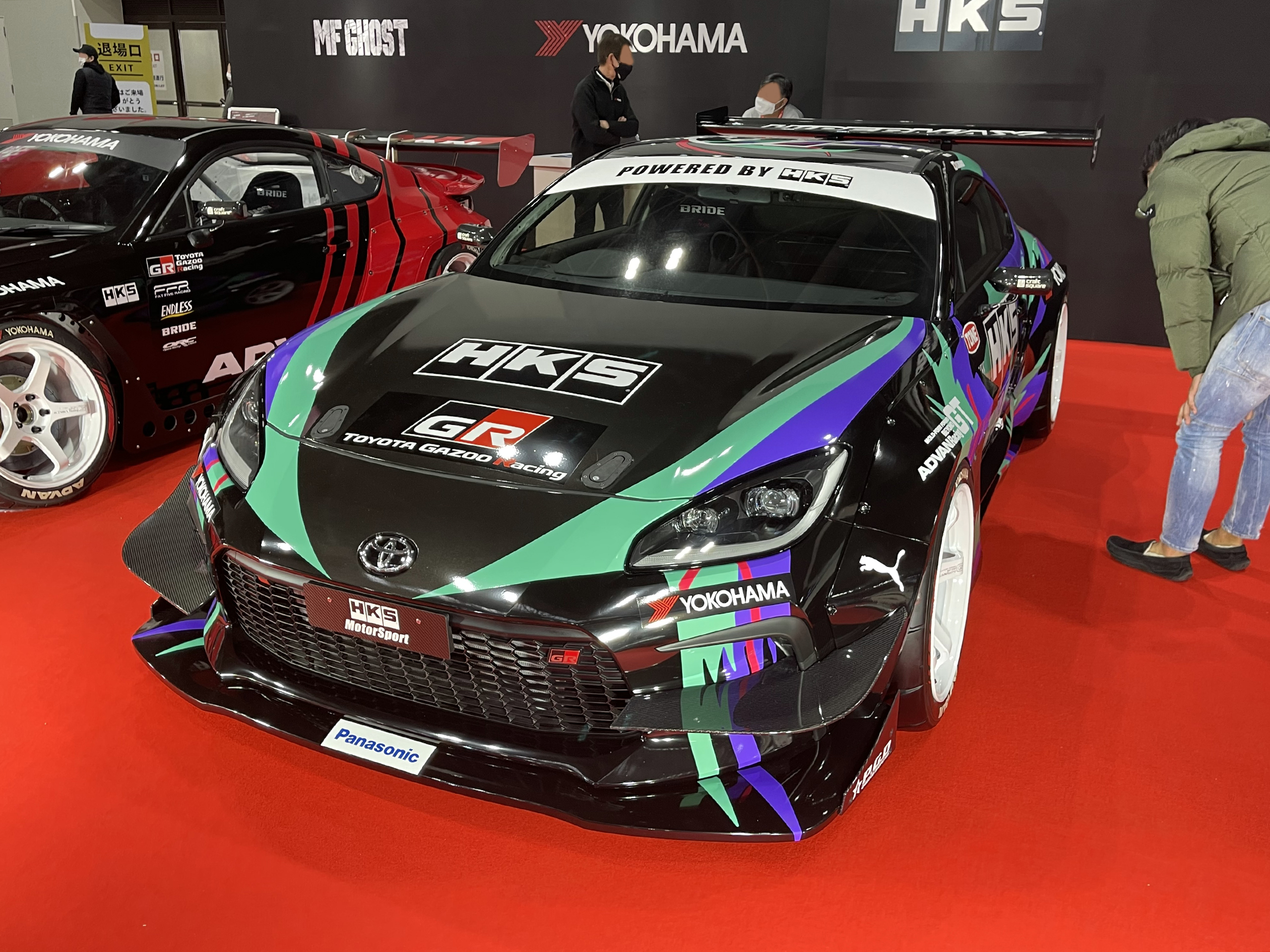
HKS Toyota GR86 with the HKS "Oil Slick" livery at the 2022 Osaka Auto Messe

HKS Co., Ltd. (株式会社エッチ・ケー・エス, Kabushiki-gaisha Ecchi Kē Esu) is a publicly traded company headquartered in Fujinomiya, Shizuoka Prefecture, Japan. The company specializes in the engineering, manufacturing, and sales of high performance aftermarket and accessory automotive parts and components. With 50 years in business, including global efforts in aftermarket parts and motorsport, the company claims, "HKS is perhaps the most known aftermarket brand in the world."

== History ==
HKS was formed in 1973 by Hiroyuki Hasegawa, a former engineer for the Yamaha Motor Company, and his partner Goichi Kitagawa, while the start up capital was supplied by Sigma Automotive (hence the name HKS). The company began operations by tuning gasoline engines in a dairy-farming shed at the foot of Mount Fuji. Their goal was to design and build high performance engines and components that major original equipment manufacturers could not, or would not, produce.

In July 1974, Hasegawa engineered and built the first commercialized turbocharger kit for passenger automobiles. Since then HKS has been developing turbocharger upgrades and bolt-on turbocharger kits that subsequently became the company's core business. HKS also created the first commercially available electronic turbo timer and boost controller, and also pioneered piggy-back fuel computers and aftermarket fuel management tools.

In 1984, HKS brought in the Nara-based tuning and service shop Twin Power Co., Ltd. under the new name of HKS Kansai Service Co., Ltd. as an affiliated partner with HKS. The shop served as a service center, tuning partner, parts distributor, and R&D partner for HKS. In 2002, HKS Kansai Service became a major suspension overhaul and servicing center for HKS suspension customers. HKS Kansai Service also gained their own accolades and accomplishments in motorsport and even began developing their own aftermarket parts. In 2010, the official affiliation came to a close and the company was renamed to Kansai Service Co., Ltd. but it still maintains a good working relationship with HKS.

In July 1984, HKS built a new factory in Kamiide, Fujinomiya, not far from the site of the original shop at the Mount Fuji dairy-farming shed. In April 1985, HKS built an additional factory in Kitayama specifically for muffler production for both HKS and on consignment. In 2003, the first HKS Technical Factory was established in Toda, Saitama and later another was established in Sapporo. These technical factories serve as HKS-owned service, tuning, and development centers, as well as offering the sale of select HKS complete vehicles and parts. Additionally, a dedicated HKS Service Center was also established in Kitakyushu. The company also operates three sales offices within Japan, in Tokyo, Nagoya, and Osaka. The HKS headquarters remains near Mount Fuji with its main 100,000 square foot manufacturing and R&D facility in Fujinomiya City, Shizuoka Prefecture with an international sales and distribution network spanning Asia, Europe, Australia and the Americas to support its customer base.

The subsidiary HKS USA was originally established in 1982 but shut down operations in 2011, with HKS electing instead to use wholesale distributors to handle their supply chain in the USA. Motovicity Distribution was selected as the North American master distributor in 2011. HKS USA was reestablished in 2017 as the consolidated subsidiary HKS USA, Inc. in Chandler, Arizona. In May 2020, Motovicity Distribution's assets were acquired by Turn 14 Distribution for authorized distribution of HKS's products in the United States. Additional subsidiary companies have been established in Cambridgeshire, England (HKS Europe) in 1996, Bangkok, Thailand (HKS Thailand) in 2001, and Shanghai, China (HKS Shanghai) in 2012.

Since June 1999, HKS has been a publicly traded company, first with the Japan Securities Dealers Association, and later in 2004 on the JASDAQ Securities Exchange.

HKS also gained full ownership of the metal processing and manufacturing company Nissei Kogyo Co., Ltd. in May, 2000. Nissei Industries also produces crankshafts, camshafts, cylinders, pistons, and injector parts.

In 2024, HKS launched a new collaborative brand with Studie AG, a BMW-specific tuning company, named HKSTUDIE. The company specializes in manufacturing tuning parts for BMW sports cars, such as exhaust systems and coilover suspension.

== Products ==
=== Automotive aftermarket ===
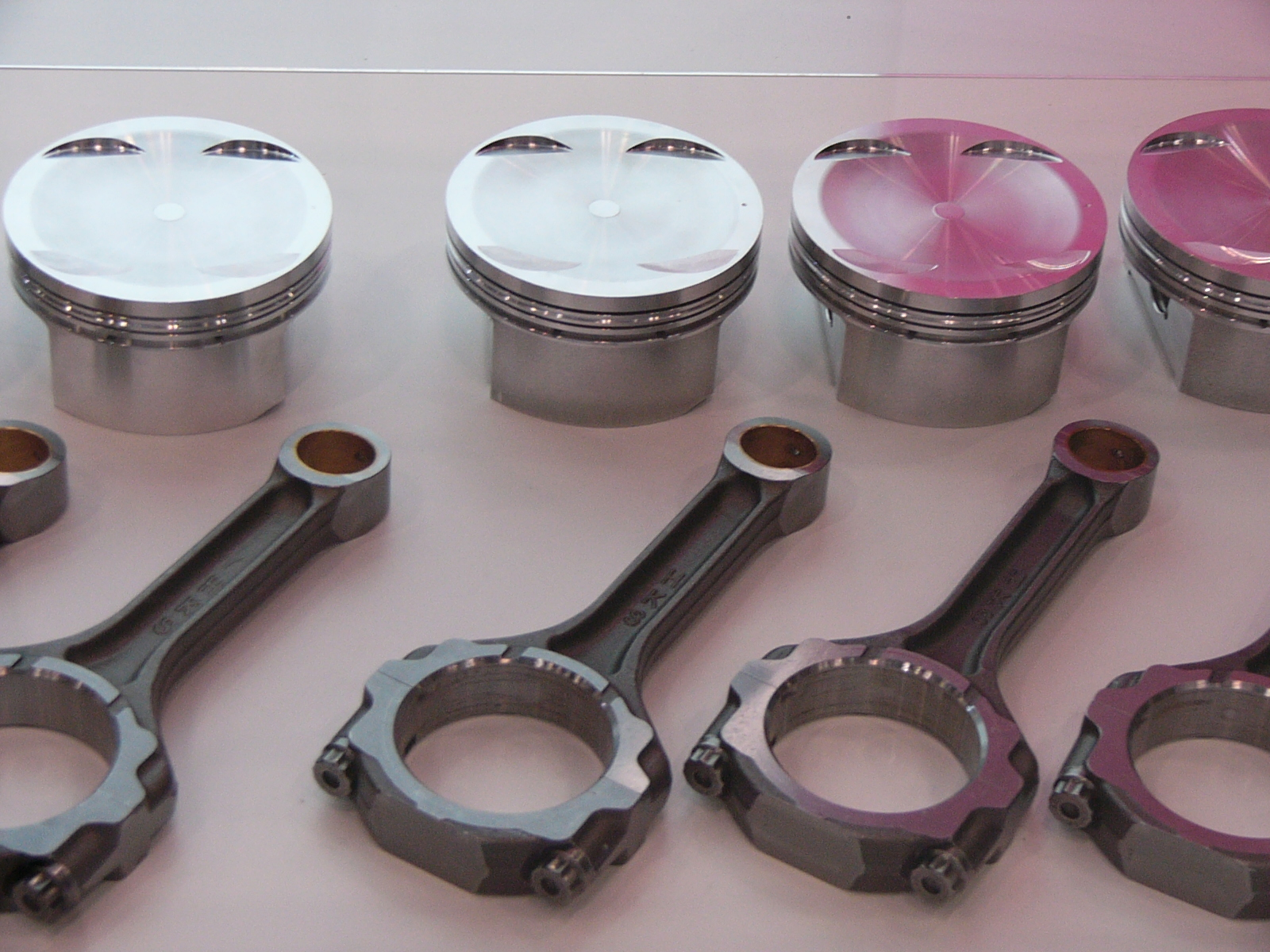
HKS pistons and connecting rods for the Nissan VQ35DE

HKS offers Japanese domestic model cars a wide variety of aftermarket parts ranging from engine internals such as connecting rods and camshafts to external parts such as blowoff valves, intercooler kits, full exhaust systems, turbo kits, engine management systems and other performance electronics.

==== Current automotive product lines ====
- Exhaust
- Suspension
- Intake
- Carbon fiber
- Electronics
- Blow off valve
- Cooling
- Turbocharger
- Supercharger
- Fuel
- Engine internals
- Drivetrain
- Brake system
- Oil
- Spark plugs
- Support parts
- Aero
- Tools
- Nano cabin filter
- Goods

=== Other products ===
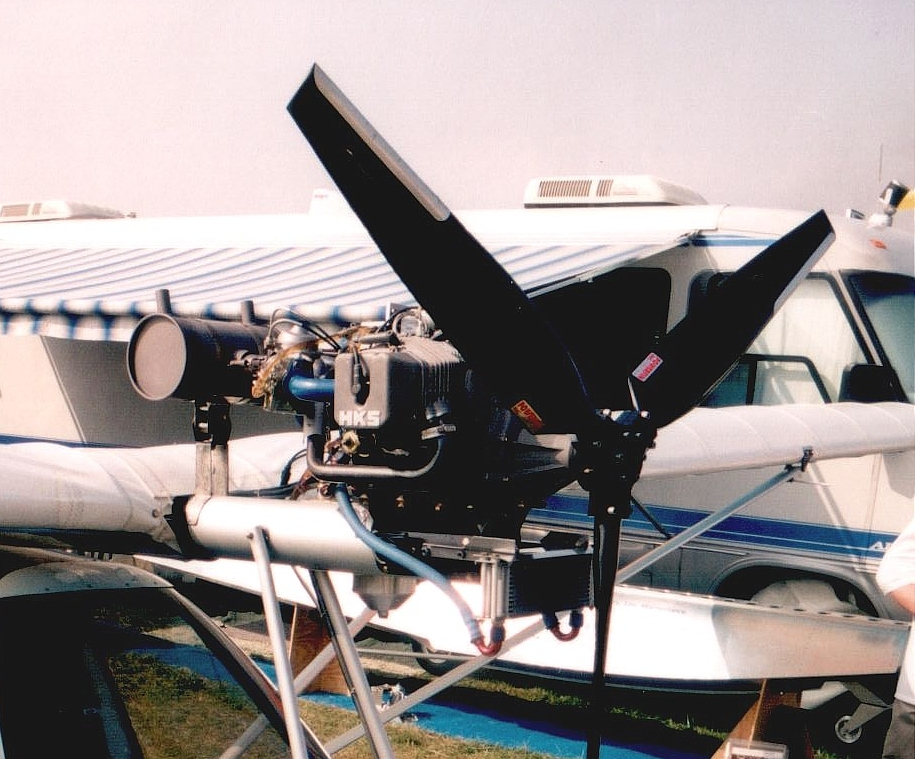
HKS 700E aircraft engine

HKS also manufactures OEM parts to automakers from technologies developed in aftermarket tuning, and even in usage such as marine jets. The company also undertakes contract manufacturing for clients. HKS received the ISO 9001 quality management standard certification in 2010, certifying manufacturing standards for OEM and contract clients.

Additionally, the company has a division for compressed natural gas engineering, as well as bi-fuel systems that run on both gasoline and compressed natural gas. These systems are designed for usage in commercial trucks as well as road vehicles.

The subsidiary HKS Aviation was launched in 1996. The company produced the HKS 700E aircraft engine along with other light-sport aircraft products, but the subsidiary has since ceased operations.

The HKS IoT Connected Service division was launched in 2019 for engineering and manufacturing connected devices such as a 360° camera, sensor system, coronavirus countermeasure device, and shuttle bus safety device. The Ministry of Land, Infrastructure, Transport and Tourism approved the Shuttle Bus Safety Monitoring Device, named "MAMORU", and HKS released it on March 31, 2023.

In 2021, the Ministry of the Environment commissioned HKS to join the "Battery Exchangeable EV Development and Renewable Energy Utilization Group" to aid in the development of exchangeable battery EV commercial (ExCVB) light-duty trucks. HKS began delivery demonstrations of prototypes at FamilyMart stores in November 2022.

== Motorsport ==
Since the 1980s, HKS has competed in many forms of motorsports including time attack, drag racing, JTCC, JGTC, F3, D1 Grand Prix, Superbikes, plus many others. They also sponsor many racers to carry the HKS name and to become part of the HKS team. They notably have had the likes of Anthony Reid (Super Touring/JTCC), Nobuteru Taniguchi (D1 Grand Prix and time attack), Tetsuya Kawasaki (Drag racing), Akira Iida (Time attack), and Max Orido (Test driver) drive for their in-house team.

=== Time attack and speed records ===
Since 1983, HKS has been heavily involved in developing and racing cars for setting both time attack and speed records. In 1983, HKS developed the HKS M300, a highly tuned Toyota Celica XX with a twin-turbocharged 5M-GE engine, to set speed records. The M300 became the first ever Japanese automobile to exceed 300 km/h (186.41 mph) with a speed record of 301.25 km/h (187.19 mph) at the Yatabe proving grounds in 1983.

In 1993, the HKS T-001, a modified Toyota Supra (A80), was developed for time attack and speed trials. It produced over 730 ps (720 hp), reached 344 km/h (214 mph), and set a lap time at the Tsukuba Circuit of 1 minute 1.97 seconds.

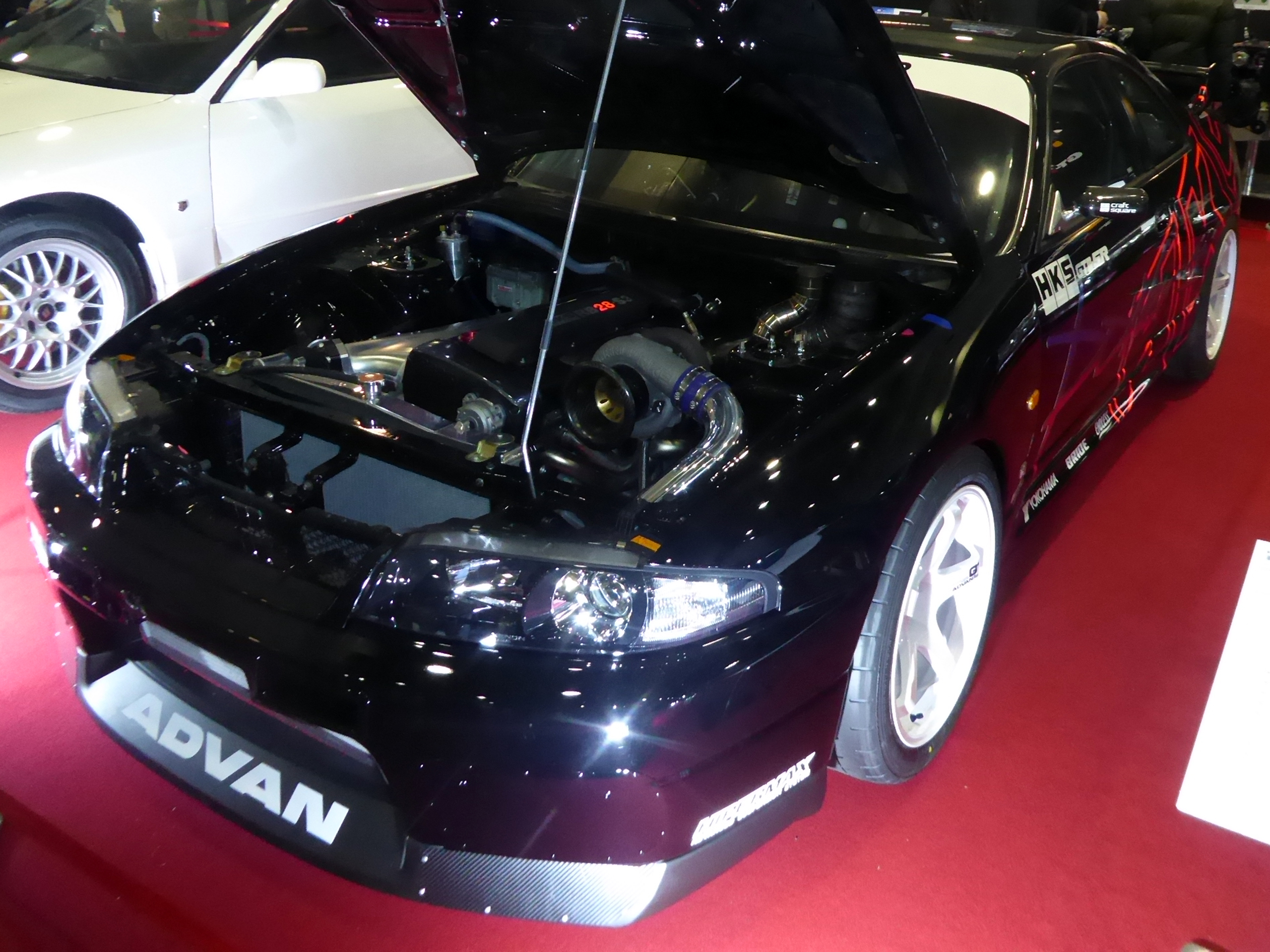
HKS T-002 R33 Skyline GT-R, lap record breaker at Tsukuba

In 1995, the team began testing with the HKS T-002, a specially tuned Nissan Skyline GT-R (R33). The T-002 set the lap record at the Tsukuba Circuit at 58.71 seconds, and a 0 to 300 km/h (186.41 mph) record of 17.64 seconds at Yatabe. It also went on to win Best Tuning Vehicle at the Tokyo Auto Salon.

The next HKS time attack vehicle, the HKS TRB-01 (an internal codename for "Tsukuba Record Breaker"), also known as the HKS Racing Altezza, was launched at the 2000 Tokyo Auto Salon. It was a tuned Toyota Altezza producing over 600 hp with extensive weight-saving, aerodynamic, and handling methods taken. It went on to set a new lap record at the Tsukuba Circuit of 55.85 seconds, driven by Nobuteru Taniguchi.

The HKS TRB-02, a time attack Mitsubishi Lancer Evolution VIII, was developed in 2003. Taniguchi set a lap record at Tsukuba in 2003 of 55.00 seconds and in 2004 of 54.73 seconds. It produced 560ps (552 hp) out of a tuned and turbocharged 4G63.

To compete in additional time attack events domestically and internationally, the HKS Racing Performer CT230R was developed in 2006. This tuned Mitsubishi Lancer Evolution IX set numerous lap records across Japan: 1 minute 42.37 seconds at Fuji Speedway, 1 minute 21.53 seconds at Tokachi Speedway, 1 minute 32.53 seconds at Okayama International Circuit, 1 minute 17.47 seconds at Central Circuit, 1 minute 23.15 seconds at Sportsland Sugo, and 53.99 seconds at Tsukuba Circuit. In the United States, the CT230R set a new record of 1 minute 43.52 seconds at Buttonwillow Raceway.

For the World Time Attack Challenge from 2014 to 2016, HKS developed the HKS GT1000+ Nissan GT-R R35. As the name implies, the GT1000+ produces over 1000 ps at 1200 ps (1183 hp). Driven by Taniguchi, the GT1000+ set a class record at Fuji Speedway of 1 minute 39.85 seconds in 2014 and 1 minute 37.77 seconds in 2015. It also won its class at the WTAC at Sydney Motorsport Park with a time of 1 minute 30.83 seconds. Notably, these lap records claim to be the fastest of any Nissan GT-R R35, and are even on par with the Nissan GT-R GT3 race car.

HKS returned to the Tsukuba Circuit in 2018 with the HKS TRB-03, a time attack Toyota 86 producing over 811 ps (800 hp). The TRB-03, again driven by Taniguchi, went on to set a new record and broke the 50-second barrier at Tsukuba with a lap time of 49.44 seconds. The TRB-03 also participated in the 2018 World Time Attack Challenge.

Later in 2018, HKS began a project to set the record for a front-wheel-drive tuner car at Tsukuba with the HKS TRB-04 Suzuki Swift. The TRB-04 weighed 930 kg (2050 lb) with a stripped body that heavily used carbon fiber, and was powered by a 4G63 MIVEC inline-four engine making 500 ps (492 hp) with an HKS GTIII turbocharger and sequential transmission. Taniguchi set the FF record at the time, with a lap time of 55.498 seconds in January 2019.

=== Japan Super Sports Championship ===
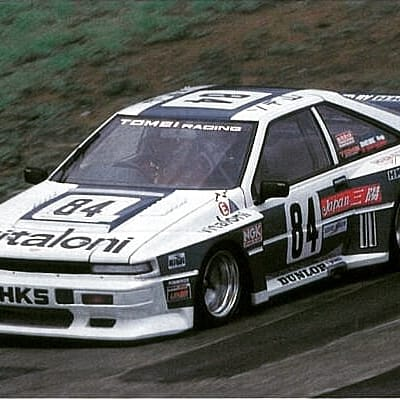
HKS World Trade Silvia S12, entered in the JSS championship

In 1984, HKS supported the FJ20ET engined 'HKS World Trade Silvia S12' competing in the JSS (Japan Super Sports) championship with driver Seiichi Sodeyama.

=== Fuji Grand Champion Series ===
HKS participated in the 1986 Grand Champion Series with an original 2000cc DOHC 4 cylinder 5 valve engine called the "186E", based on the BMW M12.

=== Formula One ===
In the early 1990s, HKS undertook a Formula One engine development program, to hopefully produce a motor in-house for use in F1 race cars. The result was the HKS 300E in 1992. The 300E was a 3.5-litre V12 (75 degree, five-valves per cylinder) producing 680 ps (671 hp) on pump gas with a 13,500 RPM redline. The engine was comparable to other F1 V12s of the era such as the Honda RA121E and Ferrari Tipo 038. It was tested in a Lola T91/50 F3000 chassis at Fuji Speedway. The program produced valuable engineering, technology, and brand value growth for HKS. However, the 300E was never used in competition and the Formula One engine program was closed after two years.

=== Japanese Touring Car Championship ===
HKS entered in the 1992 Japanese Touring Car Championship Group A, the top Japanese automobile race at the time. The team won the race at Sugo with the specially developed HKS Nissan Skyline GT-R (R32). This R32 Skyline GT-R gained popularity with its HKS "Oil Slick" livery, growth of the HKS brand during the period, and coverage in Option magazine, as well as the general success of the R32 GT-R within homologated Group A motorsports at the time.

From 1994 to 1997, the team entered the HKS Vauxhall Cavalier and HKS Opel Vectra in the JTCC. The team won three races in 1994, finishing 4th overall in 1994 and 1995. HKS also won the 12th race in 1997.

=== RRC/BE Drag Racing Series ===
From 1994 to 1996, HKS won each year's RRC and BE drag racing series with the HKS Drag R32 GT-R which produced 840 ps (828 hp). In the 1996 and 1997 BE Drag racing series, HKS entered a RB26DETT powered Nissan 180SX in the Pro Stock class.

In these drag racing series and other international drag racing competitions, the HKS team also developed the HKS Drag 70 Supra which set a 7-second 1/4 mile in 1991, the HKS Drag R33 GT-R which produced 1300 ps (1282 hp) and set a record 7.67 second 1/4 mile making it the world's fastest AWD car in 2001, and the HKS Drag 80 Supra which produced 1400 ps (1381 hp) and a sub-7 second 1/4 mile in 2001.

=== Japanese Formula 3 Championship ===
HKS participated in the Japanese Formula 3 Championship from 1994 to 1999, and won the 3rd race of the 1997 season. The team used an in-house developed engine called the 310E.

=== FIM Endurance World Championship ===
In the FIM Endurance World Championship, the premier motorcycle endurance championship, HKS entered in 1995 and 1996, especially in the Suzuka 8 Hours.

=== Formula 3 Sudamericana ===
In the South American Formula 3 Championship, HKS competed from 1995 onwards, winning the championship in 1998 with the Dallara-Mitsubishi 394 driven by Néstor Gabriel Furlán.

=== British Formula 3 Championship ===
HKS competed in the British Formula 3 Championship from 1995 to 1997 with the Fortec Motorsport Dallara-Mitsubishi team. The team finished 4th in 1995 with Warren Hughes, 5th in 1996 with Juan Pablo Montoya, and 7th in 1997 with Brian Smith.

=== D1 Grand Prix ===
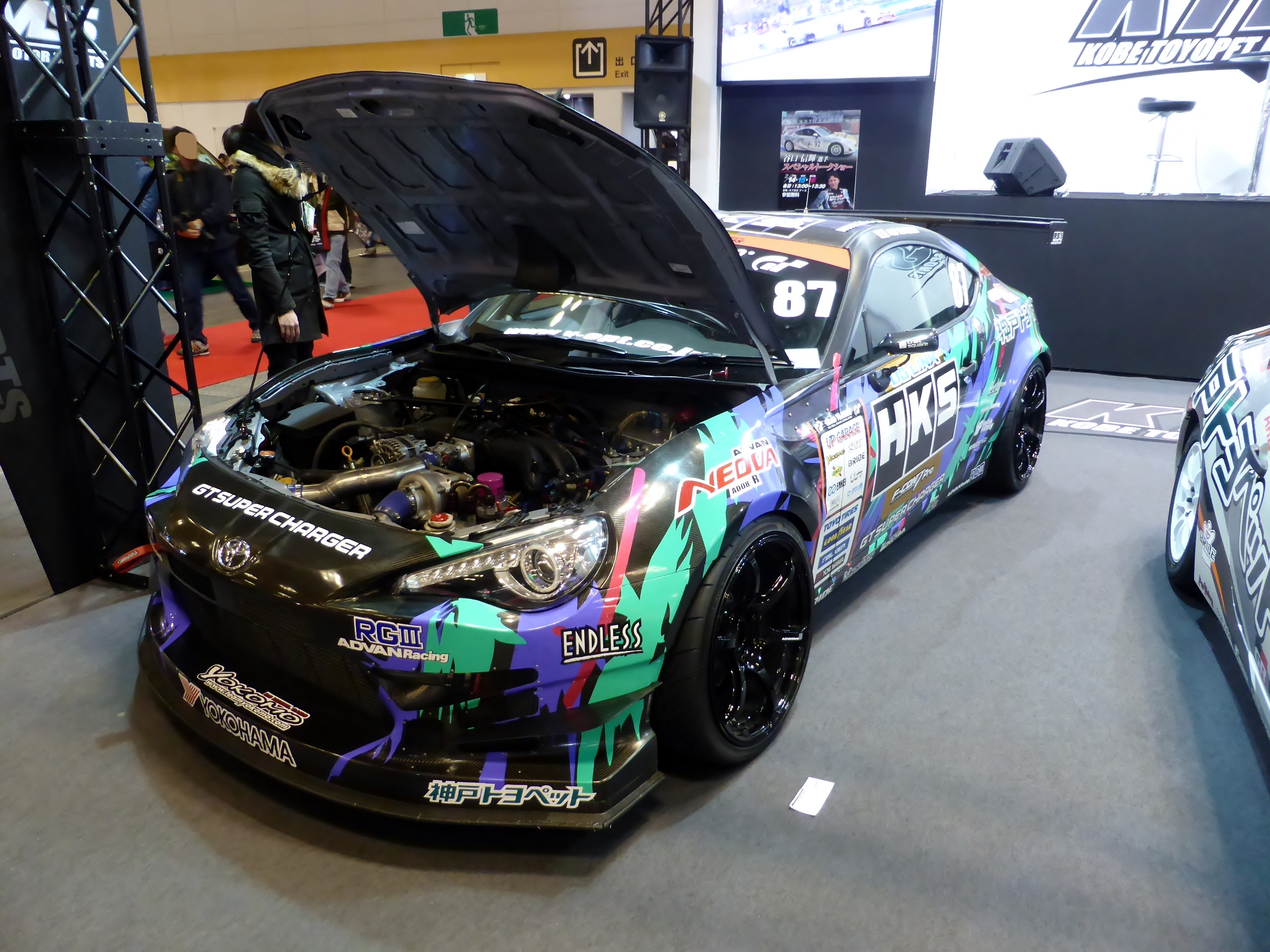
Racing Performer 86 demo car built by HKS for drifting at the 2014 Osaka Auto Messe

In the inaugural D1 Grand Prix drifting series in 2001, the HKS-sponsored Team After Fire Nissan S15 Silvia won the championship, driven by Nobuteru Taniguchi. In 2002, the HKS works team officially entered with a S15 Silvia, winning the 2nd round, and finishing as the runner-up for the season championship. The team then finished 4th for the 2003 season, after winning the last round.

The HKS team entered a modified Toyota Altezza entitled the "Racing Performer IS220R" in the 2004 series, won the 4th round and finishing in 2nd place as the championship runner-up. The Racing Performer IS220-Z was revealed for the 2006 series.

After a six-year hiatus, HKS returned to the D1GP in 2012 with the HKS Racing Performer 86 driven by Taniguchi and finished in 10th place.

The HKS works team continued to compete through 2014, whereafter HKS has chosen to instead sponsor and assist in tuning for other drift teams such as Team Toyo Tires Drift, Fat Five Racing, and Evangelion Racing. HKS-sponsored Daigo Saito later won the 2016 D1GP Championship.

=== Japanese Grand Touring Championship ===
HKS entered the Japanese Grand Touring Championship for the 2002 season with an HKS Mercedes-Benz CLK in the GT500 class, driven by Yudai Igarashi and Koji Yamanishi.

=== Japan Jet Sports Championship ===
From 2012 to 2014, HKS entered in the jet ski championship series called the Japan Jet Sports Championship and Tyking's Cup. The team ultimately finished 3rd in 2013 and 2nd in 2014.

=== JAF Cup All Japan Dirt Trial ===
In 2022, HKS entered in the rally time trial series called the JAF Cup All Japan Dirt Trial JMRC All-Star Dirt Trial Championship with a Mitsubishi Lancer Evolution X and finished in 3rd place.

HKS again entered the All Japan Dirt Trial in 2023 with the Lancer Evolution X driven by Katsuhiko Taguchi. The team won the first round at the Kyoto Cosmos Park, a fifth round heat at the Wajima City Monzen Motor Sports Park, the seventh round at Auto Park Imajyo, and the eighth round at Techniques Stage Takata.

With the victories during the 2023 season, HKS and Taguchi won the 2023 All Japan Dirt Trial Championship, marking a series championship win for their first full season of participation.

During the 2024 season, HKS won rounds 1, 3, and 5, and clinched the 2024 All Japan Dirt Trial Championship by the 6th race with 3 races left on the calendar.

== In popular culture ==
HKS tuned cars and aftermarket parts have been featured in video game series such as Need for Speed, Gran Turismo, Forza, Midnight Club, Street Racing Syndicate, and Juiced, and cars with HKS liveries and tuning have been featured in the Fast and the Furious movie series.

== Complete JGTC Results ==
(key) (Races in bold indicate pole position) (Races in italics indicate fastest lap)

Year	Car	Tyres	Class	No.	Drivers	1	2	3	4	5	6	7	8	Pos	Pts
2002	Mercedes-Benz CLK-Class	**M**	GT500	87	(Japan) Yudai Igarashi (Japan) Koji Yamanishi	TAI	FSW; DNQ	SUG; DNQ	SEP	FSW	TRM; Ret	MIN; Ret	SUZ; Ret	NC	0

== See also ==
- Winner Car and Driver Supercar Challenge
- Car tuning
- Import scene
