= Yudai Igarashi =

Japanese racing driver

Yudai Igarashi 五十嵐 勇大
- Nationality: (Japan) Japanese
- Born: September 28, 1978 (age 48) Yamagata, Japan

2003 Formula Nippon Championship
- Years active: 2000-2003
- Teams: Team Nova; Mooncraft; Team LeMans
- Starts: 33
- Wins: 0
- Poles: 0
- Fastest laps: 0
- Best finish: 13th in 2000

Previous series
- 2002-2003: All Japan Grand Touring Car Championship GT500

Yudai Igarashi (五十嵐 勇大, Igarashi Yudai; born September 24, 1978) is a Japanese retired professional race car driver, who last competed in 2003.

== Career ==
Igarashi competed in British Formula 3 in the late 1990s before returning to Japan to compete in the 2000 Formula Nippon Championship with Team LeMans. He drove ten races and scored one point, finishing 13th in the Drivers Championship. He would race in Formula Nippon for the next two seasons, with Team LeMans and Mooncraft. He scored no further points in the series. In 2003, he raced three times for Team Nova, again scoring no points.

Alongside his Formula Nippon racing, Igarashi raced GT cars. In 2000, competing in the All Japan Grand Touring Car Championship Japan GT300 series with Super Autobacs Racing driving a Toyota MR-S. The team scored 13 points and finished the championship in 16th place. In 2002, he completed three races in the series for HKS driving a Mercedes CLK in the GT500 class. The following year, he returned to the GT500 class this time with Hitotsuyama Racing. He completed 4 races driving their McLaren F1 GTR, scoring two points and finishing 32nd in the championship.

=== Complete Formula Nippon results ===
(key) (Races in bold indicate pole position) (Races in italics indicate fastest lap)

| Year | Team | 1 | 2 | 3 | 4 | 5 | 6 | 7 | 8 | 9 | 10 | DC | Pts |
|---|---|---|---|---|---|---|---|---|---|---|---|---|---|
| 2000 | Team Le Mans | SUZ; Ret | MOT; Ret | MIN; Ret | FUJ; 12 | SUZ; 12 | SUG; Ret | MOT; 6 | FUJ; 10 | MIN; 16 | SUZ; Ret | 13th | 1 |
| 2001 | Team Le Mans | SUZ; 9 | MOT; Ret | MIN; Ret | FUJ; 11 | SUZ; 7 | SUG; 8 | FUJ; Ret | MIN; Ret | MOT; Ret | SUZ; 8 | NC | 0 |
| 2002 | Mooncraft | SUZ; Ret | FUJ; Ret | MIN; 11 | SUZ; 13 | MOT; 10 | SUG; 7 | FUJ; Ret | MIN; Ret | MOT; 13 | SUZ; Ret | NC | 0 |
| 2003 | Team Nova | SUZ | FUJ | MIN | MOT | SUZ; 10 | SUG; 12 | FUJ; Ret | MIN | MOT | SUZ | NC | 0 |

=== Complete JGTC results ===
(key) (Races in bold indicate pole position) (Races in italics indicate fastest lap)

| Year | Team | Car | Class | 1 | 2 | 3 | 4 | 5 | 6 | 7 | 8 | DC | Pts |
|---|---|---|---|---|---|---|---|---|---|---|---|---|---|
| 2000 | Super AUTOBACS Racing with A’PEX | Toyota MR-S | GT300 | MOT; 6 | FUJ; 10 | SUG; 6 | FUJ | TAI | MIN | SUZ | | 16th | 13 |
| 2002 | HKS | Mercedes-Benz CLK | GT500 | TAI | FUJ; DNQ | SUG; DNQ | SEP | FUJ | MOT; Ret | MIN; Ret | SUZ; Ret | NC | 0 |
| 2003 | Hitotsuyama Racing | McLaren F1 GTR | GT500 | TAI; 13 | FUJ; 9 | SUG; 12 | FUJ | FUJ | MOT | AUT | SUZ | 20th | 2 |
