= Satoshi Motoyama =

Japanese racing driver

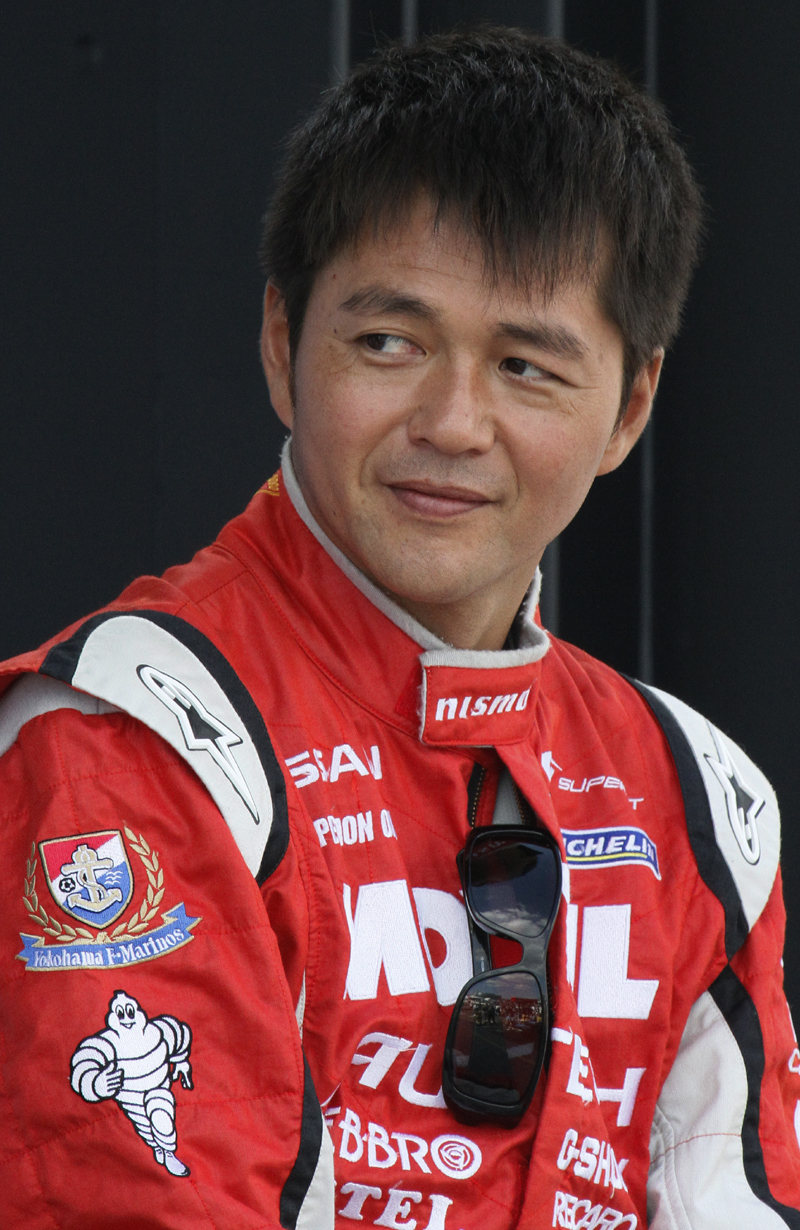
- Motoyama in 2010.
- Nationality: (Japan) Japanese
- Born: 4 March 1971 (age 55) Tokyo, Japan

Super GT career
- Debut season: 1997 (GT500)
- Current team: Audi Sport Team LeMans with Motoyama Racing
- Categorisation: FIA Platinum
- Car number: 6
- Former teams: Nismo, Impul, ARTA
- Starts: 137
- Wins: 16
- Poles: 9
- Fastest laps: 12

Previous series
- 1990–1995 1995-1997 1996-2008 1996: All-Japan F3; JTCC; Formula Nippon; JGTC GT300

Championship titles
- 1998, 2001, 2003 and 2005 2003-2004 2008: Formula Nippon JGTC (GT500); Super GT (GT500)

24 Hours of Le Mans career
- Years: 1998–1999, 2012, 2014
- Teams: Nismo/TWR
- Best finish: 10th (1998)
- Class wins: 0

Satoshi Motoyama (本山哲 - Motoyama Satoshi; born March 4, 1971) is a Japanese professional racing driver and team manager. He is best known for racing in the Super GT Series, formerly known as the All-Japan Grand Touring Car Championship (JGTC) as a factory driver for Nissan, and for racing in the Formula Nippon Championship (now known as the Super Formula Championship). He is a three-time champion of the GT500 class of Super GT, and a four-time Formula Nippon/Super Formula champion, making him one of the most successful Japanese racing drivers of all-time.

== Career ==
=== Early life and career ===
Born in Tokyo, Japan, Motoyama began his karting career at 13 years old in 1984. He won the A1 class All-Japan Karting Championship in 1986, and the A2 class titles in 1987 and 1989.

Motoyama graduated from karts in 1990, taking part in the All-Japan Formula Three Championship. Motoyama enjoyed only limited success over his first three seasons, and in 1993 and 1994 he struggled to secure sponsorship and raced only part-time in the series. In 1995, Motoyama signed with Dome Racing and finished second in the championship to Pedro de la Rosa, winning one race as De la Rosa took victories in the other eight races that season.

Motoyama raced in the Japanese Touring Car Championship (JTCC) from 1995 to 1997 during the Super Touring era. In 1997, Motoyama won three races and finished third in the championship driving for Nismo. But the season-ending race at Fuji Speedway was marred by controversy, when after he was hit by championship rival Osamu Nakako, Motoyama returned to the track and intentionally spun Nakako out and into the protective sponge barriers at the 100R corner. Motoyama was suspended for the final round of that year's Formula Nippon championship and the JGTC All-Star Race at Twin Ring Motegi, and fined ¥500,000.

=== JGTC/Super GT (1996-2018) ===
Motoyama made his debut in the All-Japan GT Championship in the third round of the 1996 season at Sendai Hi-Land Raceway, driving a GT300 class Nissan Silvia S14 owned by Kazuyoshi Hoshino. He took GT300 class pole position in his debut race, and also scored pole position in the fifth round at Sportsland Sugo.

For the 1997 season, Motoyama stepped up to the premier GT500 class, driving alongside Hoshino in the Calsonic Nissan Skyline GT-R for Team Impul. Motoyama switched teams for the 1998 season, partnering up with Aguri Suzuki and the new Autobacs Racing Team Aguri squad and co-driver Takeshi Tsuchiya. Motoyama finished 11th in the 1997 standings, and 12th in 1998.

In 1999, Motoyama, who had just won his first Formula Nippon championship, was promoted to the reigning champions at Nismo, driving the Pennzoil Skyline GT-R alongside defending series champion and Formula 1 veteran Érik Comas. In the fourth round of the season, Motoyama scored his first career GT500 victory at the Central Park Miné Circuit. Motoyama scored four podium finishes in total, and finished third in the Drivers' Championship as Comas went on to win his second straight GT500 title. Motoyama only missed the second round of the 1999 season at Fuji Speedway, as he was participating in a pre-qualifying session for the 24 Hours of Le Mans that same day. Motoyama moved back to Calsonic Team Impul in 2000, and had another solid year that included a second career win at Miné in the penultimate round of the year. He once again finished third in the championship with co-driver Hoshino.

In 2002, Motoyama moved back to Nismo having won his second Formula Nippon title. His new co-driver was German driver Michael Krumm. Motoyama and Krumm renewed their partnership in 2003 after a disappointing 2002 season, scoring points in all seven rounds that year, and podium finishes at TI Circuit Aida, Sugo, Fuji, and Suzuka Circuit. Despite not winning a race, Motoyama and Krumm's consistency in the #23 Xanavi Skyline GT-R was enough for them to become GT500 champions, clinching the championship with a third-place finish at Suzuka. By winning his first JGTC title, and the Formula Nippon title earlier in the year, Motoyama became only the second driver to win both championships in the same calendar year, joining 1997 "double champion" Pedro de la Rosa.

Motoyama was given a new car for his 2004 title defense, the new Nissan Fairlady Z33, which succeeded the Skyline GT-R as Nissan's flagship GT500 car. He also had a new co-driver in Richard Lyons. In their first race together at Nismo, and the first race for the new Nissan Z, Motoyama ended a four-year winless drought by winning the opening round at TI Circuit. Taking podium finishes at Sepang International Circuit and Twin Ring Motegi, plus a second win at the Autopolis circuit, Motoyama won back-to-back GT500 championships with Nismo. Motoyama won one race in each of the next three seasons, and continued to compete for championships in 2005 and in 2006, finishing third and sixth in the standings respectively.

2008 saw the introduction of the new R35 Nissan GT-R as Nissan's GT500 challenger, and Motoyama continued on with Nismo, with new co-driver Benoît Tréluyer. The duo led a 1-2 finish in the GT-R's Super GT debut at the opening round at Suzuka. They followed that up with a win at Okayama International Circuit, taking back-to-back wins to open the year. Though they struggled through the next few rounds with heavy success ballast, Motoyama and Tréluyer won their third race of the year at Autopolis, and went on to win the championship - making Motoyama the first three-time GT500 champion. Motoyama and Tréluyer won twice in 2009, at Fuji and at Sugo. The victory at Sugo was Motoyama's 12th career GT500 win, moving him ahead of Yuji Tachikawa for the all-time wins record. In 2010, Motoyama and Tréluyer failed to win a race for the first time, coming as close as two second-place finishes at Sepang, and at the Suzuka Summer Special in August.

In the final year of Motoyama and Tréluyer's partnership at Nismo, they won three races, at Fuji, Autopolis, and Motegi, and finished runner-up in the GT500 championship. The win at Autopolis was notable for Motoyama sprinting from 12th on the grid to the lead of the race in just 26 laps, in a race that they needed to win in order to keep their championship hopes alive going into the Motegi finale.

After switching from Nismo to two-time reigning GT500 champions MOLA in 2013, Motoyama claimed his last victory in the 2015 Buriram Super GT Race held at Chang International Circuit. At Sugo, he took his final career pole position. Reigning Blancpain GT Series Endurance Cup champion Katsumasa Chiyo joined Motoyama at MOLA for the 2016 season, and the duo scored a podium finish on debut at Okayama, and another podium finish that year in the Suzuka 1000 km, with Mitsunori Takaboshi replacing an injured Chiyo. At the fourth round of the 2017 season at Sugo, Motoyama took his final Super GT podium finish with a second place, notable for Motoyama's battle on the final corners of the final lap with Kohei Hirate. Motoyama and Chiyo remained together for 2018, this time driving for NDDP Racing with B-Max, who took over MOLA's entry in GT500. Motoyama drove his final race as a GT500 driver on November 11, 2018, at Twin Ring Motegi, finishing 9th.

On 10 February, 2019, Motoyama announced his retirement as a Nissan GT500 driver. He became an Executive Advisor to Nissan's factory GT500 programme that same year.

=== Formula Nippon (1996-2008) ===
Motoyama made his debut in the Formula Nippon Championship in 1996, driving for first-year team owner Aguri Suzuki and the new Funai Super Aguri team. He scored his first podium finish in the sixth round of the season at Sportsland Sugo, and started on the front row in the final round at Fuji Speedway before he was involved in a multi-car pileup on the first lap. He finished 10th in the championship in 1996 and 11th in 1997.

For 1998, Motoyama moved to Team LeMans. He took his first career win at the second round at Central Park Miné Circuit, and his second win in the following round at Fuji, where he also recorded his first pole position. He won his third race at Miné in the eighth round of the season, and clinched his first Formula Nippon championship with a second-place finish in the penultimate round at Fuji. Motoyama returned to Team LeMans the following year in 1999, taking another three victories and three pole positions. He went on to finish second in the championship standings to Tom Coronel.

In 2000, Motoyama changed teams to Team Impul, driving for Kazuyoshi Hoshino as he did in the JGTC. Motoyama finished a distant third in the championship behind Toranosuke Takagi, taking one win, two poles, and four podiums in the final four races. The 2001 season started with Motoyama taking three pole positions through the first four rounds, and a victory at Miné, but two retirements and a non-scoring finish saw him trail championship leader Naoki Hattori by 22 points after four races. However, Motoyama took victories in three of the following four rounds, taking the championship lead as Hattori began to struggle, and eventually clinching his second Formula Nippon title with a second-place finish at Motegi. In 2002, the first year in which Formula Nippon went to a spec chassis, Motoyama had another fantastic season, winning five out of the ten races that season. Despite winning more races than any other driver that year, Motoyama would end up losing the championship by just two points to Ralph Firman.

The 2003 season began with success and tragedy. Motoyama won the opening round at Suzuka Circuit, and won the following round at Fuji. Motoyama was unable to celebrate his win at Fuji, however, after he learned of his childhood friend Daijiro Kato suffering critical injuries in a crash during the 2003 MotoGP World Championship round at Suzuka. On April 27, a week after Kato died of his injuries, Motoyama took his third consecutive win of the season at Miné. Motoyama took another victory in the sixth round at Sugo, and despite a late surge from his Impul teammate Benoît Tréluyer, Motoyama was able to clinch his third championship with a second-place finish in the penultimate round at Motegi. He joined his mentor Kazuyoshi Hoshino and former F1 driver Satoru Nakajima as only the third driver to win three or more Japanese top formula championships, and was the first driver in the Formula Nippon era to win three championships.

After testing for the Renault and Jordan Formula 1 teams in hopes of landing a race set, Motoyama returned to Formula Nippon in 2004, switching teams to Team 5ZIGEN. Motoyama only won once, in the sixth round of the season at Sugo, and finished sixth in the championship - his worst result since 1997. For 2005, Motoyama secured a transfer back to Team Impul, and returned to championship form by winning three races at Sugo, Suzuka, and in the penultimate round at Motegi, a win which clinched his fourth Formula Nippon championship, ahead of his Impul teammate Yuji Ide. Motoyama remained with Impul in 2006, but failed to win a race for the first time since 1997 as he finished fifth in the championship with four podiums. Motoyama returned to winning form in 2007, winning all three of the season's races held at Suzuka Circuit. His victory in the final round at Suzuka was the 27th win of his Formula Nippon career, and it would turn out to be his last.

Motoyama returned to Team LeMans, the team for whom he won his first championship, for the 2008 season. He finished eleventh in the championship, with one podium finish in the second leg of a double-header round at Suzuka. On February 18, 2009, Motoyama announced on his website that he would not race in the 2009 Formula Nippon Championship, bringing an end to his career in Japanese top formula racing.

His four championships, 27 wins, and 21 pole positions are the most of any driver in the Formula Nippon/Super Formula era from 1996 to the present day. In the overall history of Japanese Top Formula racing, dating back to the inaugural 1973 All-Japan Formula 2000 Championship, Motoyama is second all-time in career victories to Kazuyoshi Hoshino, who won 39 races from 1974 to 1996.

Nearly nine years after his final race, Motoyama tested the Dallara SF14 at Sportsland Sugo on September 27, 2017. In March 2018, Motoyama became the team director of B-Max Racing Team in the Super Formula Championship. B-Max Racing won its first race under Motoyama's leadership when driver Nobuharu Matsushita won the third round of the 2022 Super Formula Championship at Suzuka.

=== Return to racing (2019-present) ===
Motoyama remained semi-active in racing after retiring from GT500 driving duties. In December 2020, Motoyama returned to single-seater racing, competing in the final round of the Formula Regional Japanese Championship at Autopolis in a car entered by Team Goh Motorsports. He entered the final round of the Super Formula Lights Championship at Fuji Speedway, driving for B-Max Racing. This marked Motoyama's return to the second tier of Japanese single-seater racing for the first time since 1995.

On 30 January, 2021, Motoyama announced that he would return to full-time Super GT competition in the GT300 class. Motoyama partnered with Team LeMans, the team for whom he won his first Formula Nippon Championship, to form Team LeMans with Motoyama Racing. The team fielded an Audi R8 LMS GT3 Evo for himself and former All-Japan Formula 3 National Class Champion, Yoshiaki Katayama. Team LeMans with Motoyama Racing recorded a best finish of 12th at Suzuka Circuit in 2021.

Motoyama returned to Team LeMans for the 2022 season, and achieved a breakthrough fifth-place finish to start the season at Okayama. But his contract was terminated prior to the second round at Fuji Speedway, and he was replaced by Roberto Merhi.

=== 24 Hours of Le Mans ===
Motoyama has competed at the 24 Hours of Le Mans four times, making his debut in 1998 with NISMO and Tom Walkinshaw Racing in one of four factory Nissan R390 GT1s. Motoyama, Masami Kageyama, and Takuya Kurosawa drove the #33 JOMO R390 GT1 to a tenth-place overall finish, ninth in the GT1 category. Motoyama returned the following year in 1999 with NISMO, driving the new Nissan R391 Le Mans prototype. Motoyama and co-drivers Érik Comas and Michael Krumm ran as high as fourth place overall in the #22 R391, before retiring after 110 laps with an electrical issue.

After thirteen years away from Le Mans, Motoyama made his return in 2012, driving the Nissan-powered DeltaWing experimental prototype for Highcroft Racing alongside Krumm and Marino Franchitti. With six hours elapsed in the race, Motoyama was racing in heavy traffic after a safety car restart when he was hit by the Toyota TS030 Hybrid of Kazuki Nakajima in the Porsche Curves, sending him crashing into the concrete barriers. In one of the race's most memorable moments, Motoyama spent two hours trying to repair the DeltaWing, as his Nissan mechanics stood behind the spectator fencing to give instructions. Ultimately, he was forced to abandon the car and retire from the race.

Motoyama's last Le Mans outing to date was in 2014, driving yet another Nissan experimental vehicle, the all-electric ZEOD RC, with Nissan GT Academy graduates Lucas Ordoñez and Wolfgang Reip. Shortly after the ZEOD completed the first all-electric lap at the Circuit de la Sarthe, the car was forced to retire after just five laps.

=== Formula One ===
After becoming JGTC and Formula Nippon champion in 2003, and motivated after the death of his childhood friend Daijiro Kato, Motoyama began to pursue opportunities to race in the Formula One World Championship. On October 10, 2003, Motoyama was given a Friday test drive for the Jordan F1 Team prior to the Japanese Grand Prix at Suzuka Circuit. On December 10, 2003, Motoyama was given a chance to test with the Renault F1 Team at Circuito de Jerez in Spain. He completed 69 laps and was only two seconds off the fastest lap recorded by Renault ace driver Fernando Alonso.

Ultimately, Motoyama was unable to secure a drive for the 2004 season, and soon thereafter abandoned his pursuit of a Formula One drive.

=== Other series ===
In 1999, Motoyama won the Le Mans Fuji 1000km at Fuji Speedway, driving the same Nissan R391 that he competed with at Le Mans that year.

Motoyama has competed in the Super Taikyu Series (formerly the N1 Endurance Series), most recently in 2023 in a one-off entry in the 2023 Fuji Super TEC 24 Hours, driving a Porsche 718 Cayman GT4 RS Clubsport for Porsche Team EBI Waimarama.

Motoyama ran the 2019 Fuji 24 Hours, driving a customer Nissan GT-R NISMO GT3 for Tairoku Racing with B-Max Engineering, and finished 2nd overall. Motoyama was expected to enter that year's Intercontinental GT Challenge Suzuka 10 Hours later that year, but health issues forced team president Tairoku Yamaguchi to suspend his team's operations for the rest of 2019. Motoyama was expected to return to the team for the 2020 Super Taikyu Series, but their entry was suspended due to complications caused by the COVID-19 pandemic. Two years prior, he competed as the owner and driver of SKT Team Motoyama, fielding a Nissan Fairlady Z34 in the ST-3 class.

== Racing record ==
=== Complete Japanese Formula 3 results ===
(key) (Races in bold indicate pole position) (Races in italics indicate fastest lap)

Year	Team	Engine	1	2	3	4	5	6	7	8	9	10	11	DC	Pts
1990	Le Garage Cox Racing Team	Mugen	SUZ; 9	FUJ; 15	SUZ; 12	TSU; 14	SEN; 5	SUG; 13	TSU; 13	SUZ; Ret	NIS; 5	SUZ; DNS		11th	4
1991	Le Garage Cox Racing Team	Mugen	SUZ; 6	FUJ; C	FUJ; 7	SUZ; 7	TSU; 16	SEN; 4	MIN; 14	TSU; 2	SUG; 3	SUZ; 26	SUZ; 20	6th	14
1992	Xebec Motor Sports	Mugen	SUZ; Ret	**TSU**; 2	FUJ; 17	SUZ; Ret	SEN; 5	TAI; 10	MIN; 6	SUG; 6	SUZ; 8	SUZ; 6		8th	11
1993	Dallara Automobili Japan	Mugen	SUZ	TSU	FUJ	SUZ	SEN; 11	TAI; Ret	MIN; 9					11th	4
1993	Dallara Automobili Japan	Fiat								SUG; 5	SUZ; 5			11th	4
1994	Team 5Zigen	Toyota	SUZ; 7	FUJ	TSU	SUZ	SEN	TOK	MIN; 5	TAI; 4	SUG; 4	SUZ; Ret		7th	8
1995	Dome Racing	Mugen	SUZ; 2	**FUJ**; C	TSU; 1	MIN; 3	SUZ; 2	TAI; 2	SUG; 5	FUJ; 9	SUZ; 2	SEN; 3		2nd	37

=== Complete Japanese Touring Car Championship (1994-) results ===
(key) (Races in bold indicate pole position) (Races in italics indicate fastest lap)

Year	Team	Car	1	2	3	4	5	6	7	8	9	10	11	12	13	14	15	16	DC	Pts
1995	Object T	Toyota Corona	FUJ; 1 Ret	FUJ; 2 Ret															19th	9
1995	Object T	Toyota Corona EXiV			SUG; 1; 8	SUG; 2; 5	TOK; 1; 22	TOK; 2; 17	SUZ; 1; 19	SUZ; 2; 16	MIN; 1; 22	MIN; 2 Ret	AID; 1 Ret	AID; 2; 11	SEN; 1 Ret	SEN; 2; 12	FUJ; 1 Ret	FUJ; 2; 17	19th	9
1996	Nismo	Nissan Sunny	FUJ; 1 Ret	FUJ; 2; 8	SUG; 1 Ret	SUG; 2 DNS	SUZ; 1; 8	SUZ; 2; 7	**MIN**; **1**; 8	MIN; 2; 9									9th	46
1996	Nismo	Nissan Primera Camino									SEN; 1; 5	SEN; 2 Ret	TOK; 1; 6	TOK; 2; 5	FUJ; 1; 4	FUJ; 2; 4			9th	46
1997	Nismo	Nissan Primera Camino	**FUJ**; **1** C	FUJ; 2 C	AID; 1; 4	AID; 2; 2	SUG; 1; 3	SUG; 2; 3	SUZ; 1 Ret	SUZ; 2; 1	**MIN**; **1** DSQ	**MIN**; **2**; 3	SEN; 1; 1	SEN; 2 Ret	**TOK**; **1**; 2	TOK; 2; 4	FUJ; 1; 6	FUJ; 2 DSQ	**3rd**	**100**

=== Complete JGTC/Super GT Results ===
(key) (Races in bold indicate pole position) (Races in italics indicate fastest lap)

Year	Team	Car	Class	1	2	3	4	5	6	7	8	9	DC	Points
1996	Hoshino Racing	Nissan Silvia	GT300	SUZ	FUJ	SEN; Ret	FUJ; Ret	SUG; 12	MIN; 7				29th	4
1997	Impul	Nissan Skyline GT-R	GT500	SUZ; Ret	FUJ; 5	SEN; 15	FUJ; 4	MIN; 6	SUG; 14				11th	24
1998	ARTA	Nissan Skyline GT-R	GT500	SUZ; 13	FUJ; C	SEN; 11	FUJ; 6	MOT; 6	MIN; 9	SUG; 8			12th	17
1999	NISMO	Nissan Skyline GT-R	GT500	SUZ; 2	FUJ	SUG; 6	MIN; 1	FUJ; 3	TAI; 7	MOT; 3			**3rd**	**69**
2000	Impul	Nissan Skyline GT-R	GT500	MOT; 17	FUJ; 5	SUG; 5	FUJ; 3	TAI; 6	MIN; 1	SUZ; 3			**3rd**	**66**
2001	Impul	Nissan Skyline GT-R	GT500	TAI; 15	FUJ; Ret	SUG; 7	FUJ; 7	MOT; 3	SUZ; 11	MIN; 5			11th	28
2002	NISMO	Nissan Skyline GT-R	GT500	TAI; 11	FUJ; 7	SUG; 7	SEP; 4	FUJ; 2	MOT; 10	MIN; 2	SUZ; Ret		8th	51
2003	NISMO	Nissan Skyline GT-R	GT500	**TAI**; 2	FUJ; 4	SUG; 3	FUJ; 5	FUJ; 2	MOT; 11	AUT; 5	SUZ; 3		**1st**	**86**
2004	NISMO	Nissan Z	GT500	TAI; 1	SUG; Ret	SEP; 3	TOK; Ret	MOT; 3	AUT; 1	SUZ; 7			**1st**	**73**
2005	NISMO	Nissan Z	GT500	OKA; Ret	FUJ; 4	SEP; 1	SUG; 8	MOT; 6	FUJ; 10	AUT; 6	SUZ; 2		**3rd**	**60**
2006	NISMO	Nissan Z	GT500	SUZ; 2	OKA; Ret	FUJ; 4	SEP; 5	SUG; 2	SUZ; DSQ	MOT; 14	AUT; 1	FUJ; 11	6th	69
2007	NISMO	Nissan Z	GT500	SUZ; 2	OKA; Ret	FUJ; 1	SEP; 14	SUG; Ret	SUZ; 3	MOT; 13	AUT; 12	FUJ; 14	8th	48
2008	NISMO	Nissan GT-R	GT500	SUZ; 1	**OKA**; 1	FUJ; 14	SEP; 13	SUG; 14	SUZ; 8	MOT; 12	**AUT**; 1	FUJ; 9	**1st**	**76**
2009	NISMO	Nissan GT-R	GT500	OKA; 13	**SUZ**; 11	**FUJ**; 1	**SEP**; 8	SUG; 1	SUZ; 6	FUJ; 2	AUT; 2	MOT; 14	**3rd**	**78**
2010	NISMO	Nissan GT-R	GT500	SUZ; 8	OKA; Ret	FUJ; Ret	SEP; 2	**SUG**; 6	SUZ; 2	FUJ; C	MOT; 8		7th	48
2011	NISMO	Nissan GT-R	GT500	OKA; 5	FUJ; 1	SEP; 14	SUG; 12	SUZ; 4	FUJ; 6	AUT; 1	MOT; 1		**2nd**	**79**
2012	NISMO	Nissan GT-R	GT500	OKA; 4	FUJ; 3	SEP; 7	SUG; Ret	SUZ; 5	FUJ; 11	AUT; 6	MOT; 6		8th	40
2013	MOLA	Nissan GT-R	GT500	OKA; 10	FUJ; 9	SEP; 6	**SUG**; 7	SUZ; 8	FUJ; 7	AUT; 4	MOT; 14		12th	28
2014	MOLA	Nissan GT-R	GT500	OKA; 10	FUJ; Ret	AUT; 2	SUG; 7	FUJ; 6	SUZ; 13	BUR; Ret	MOT; 5		11th	31
2015	MOLA	Nissan GT-R	GT500	OKA; 8	FUJ; 10	CHA; 1	FUJ; 14	SUZ; 6	**SUG**; 2	AUT; 6	MOT; Ret		6th	50
2016	MOLA	Nissan GT-R	GT500	OKA; 3	FUJ; 7	**SUG**; 13	FUJ; Ret	SUZ; 3	CHA; 12	MOT; 6	MOT; 8		10th	36
2017	MOLA	Nissan GT-R	GT500	OKA; Ret	FUJ; 11	AUT; 4	SUG; 2	FUJ; 11	SUZ; 14	CHA; 10	MOT; 6		12th	29
2018	NDDP by B-Max Racing	Nissan GT-R	GT500	OKA; 7	FUJ; 10	SUZ; 7	CHA; 13	FUJ; 15	SUG; 8	AUT; 13	MOT; 9		17th	14
2021	Motoyama Racing with Team LeMans	Audi R8 LMS Evo	GT300	OKA; 22	FUJ; 23	MOT; 19	SUZ; 12	SUG; 18	AUT; 24	MOT; 20	FUJ; 18		29th	0
2022	Motoyama Racing with Team LeMans	Audi R8 LMS Evo	GT300	OKA; 5	FUJ	SUZ	FUJ	SUZ	SUG	AUT	MOT		26th	6

=== Complete Formula Nippon results ===
(key) (Races in bold indicate pole position) (Races in italics indicate fastest lap)

Year	Entrant	1	2	3	4	5	6	7	8	9	10	11	DC	Points
1996	FUNAI SUPER AGURI	SUZ; 7	MIN; Ret	FUJ; 5	TOK; 17	SUZ; 12	SUG; 3	FUJ; 5	MIN; 6	SUZ; Ret	FUJ; DNS		10th	9
1997	FUNAI SUPER AGURI	SUZ; 4	MIN; DNS	FUJ; Ret	SUZ; Ret	SUG; Ret	FUJ; Ret	MIN; 6	MOT; Ret	FUJ; 4	SUZ		11th	7
1998	LEMONed Le Mans	SUZ; Ret	MIN; 1	**FUJ**; 1	MOT; 2	SUZ; Ret	SUG; 4	FUJ; C	MIN; 1	FUJ; 2	**SUZ**; Ret		**1st**	**45**
1999	UNLIMITED Le Mans	SUZ; 1	MOT; 2	MIN; 1	FUJ; Ret	**SUZ**; Ret	SUG; 2	FUJ; 3	MIN; Ret	**MOT**; 1	SUZ; Ret		**2nd**	**46**
2000	IMPUL	SUZ; 6	MOT; 4	MIN; Ret	FUJ; 8	SUZ; 6	SUG; 4	MOT; 3	**FUJ**; 2	MIN; 2	**SUZ**; 1		**3rd**	**34**
2001	excite IMPUL	SUZ; Ret	**MOT**; 9	**MIN**; 1	**FUJ**; Ret	SUZ; 1	SUG; 1	FUJ; 4	MIN; 1	MOT; 2	SUZ; Ret		**1st**	**49**
2002	Xbox IMPUL	SUZ; Ret	**FUJ**; 1	MIN; 1	SUZ; 5	MOT; 1	SUG; Ret	FUJ; 3	MIN; 1	MOT; 4	SUZ; 1		**2nd**	**60**
2003	IMPUL	SUZ; 1	**FUJ**; 1	**MIN**; 1	MOT; 9	SUZ; 14	SUG; 1	**FUJ**; 2	**MIN**; 13	MOT; 2	**SUZ**; 3		**1st**	**56**
2004	ADiRECT 5ZIGEN	SUZ; 5	SUG; 12	MOT; 5	SUZ; 4	SUG; 1	MIN; 6	SEP; Ret	MOT; 5	SUZ; 6			6th	21
2005	Arting IMPUL	MOT; 4	SUZ; 4	**SUG**; 1	FUJ; 2	**SUZ**; 1	MIN; 3	FUJ; 13	MOT; 1	SUZ; 2			**1st**	**52**
2006	arting IMPUL	FUJ; 3	SUZ; 8	MOT; 3	SUZ; 3	AUT; Ret	FUJ; 3	SUG; 5	MOT; Ret	SUZ; Ret			5th	16
2007	Arabian Oasis IMPUL	FUJ; Ret	SUZ; 1	MOT; 6	OKA; 10	SUZ; 1	**FUJ**; Ret	SUG; 4	MOT; 11	SUZ; 1			4th	38
2008	Team LeMans	FUJ; Ret	SUZ; 4	MOT; 16	OKA; Ret	SUZ1; 8	**SUZ2**; 3	MOT1; 9	MOT2; 5	FUJ1; 14	FUJ2; 14	**SUG**; Ret	11th	14

=== Complete Formula One participations ===
(key)

Year	Entrant	Chassis	Engine	1	2	3	4	5	6	7	8	9	10	11	12	13	14	15	16	WDC	Points
2003	Jordan Ford	Jordan EJ13	Ford V10	AUS	MAL	BRA	SMR	ESP	AUT	MON	CAN	EUR	FRA	GBR	GER	HUN	ITA	USA	JPN; TD	—	—

=== Complete 24 Hours of Le Mans results ===
Year	Team	Co-Drivers	Car	Class	Laps	Pos.	Class Pos.
1998	(Japan) Nissan Motorsports (United Kingdom) TWR	(Japan) Takuya Kurosawa (Japan) Masami Kageyama	Nissan R390 GT1	GT1	319	10th	9th
1999	(Japan) Nissan Motorsports	(Germany) Michael Krumm (France) Érik Comas	Nissan R391	LMP	110	DNF	DNF
2012	(United States) Highcroft Racing	(United Kingdom) Marino Franchitti (Germany) Michael Krumm	DeltaWing-Nissan	UNC	75	DNF	DNF
2014	(Japan) Nissan Motorsports Global	(Spain) Lucas Ordóñez (Belgium) Wolfgang Reip	Nissan ZEOD RC	UNC	5	DNF	DNF

== Sources ==
- Speedsport Magazine Race Driver Database

Sporting positions
Preceded by Pedro de la Rosa	Formula Nippon Champion; 1998	Succeeded by Tom Coronel
Preceded by Toranosuke Takagi	Formula Nippon Champion; 2001	Succeeded by Ralph Firman
Preceded by Ralph Firman	Formula Nippon Champion; 2003	Succeeded by Richard Lyons
Preceded by Juichi Wakisaka; Akira Iida	All-Japan Grand Touring Car Champion (GT500); 2003*–2004** *with:Michael Krumm **with:Richard Lyons	Succeeded by Yuji Tachikawa; Toranosuke Takagi
Preceded by Richard Lyons	Formula Nippon Champion; 2005	Succeeded by Benoît Tréluyer
Preceded by Daisuke Ito; Ralph Firman	Super GT (GT500) Champion; 2008 with: Benoît Tréluyer	Succeeded by Juichi Wakisaka; André Lotterer
