= Toyota Celica =

Sports car by Toyota, 1970 to 2006

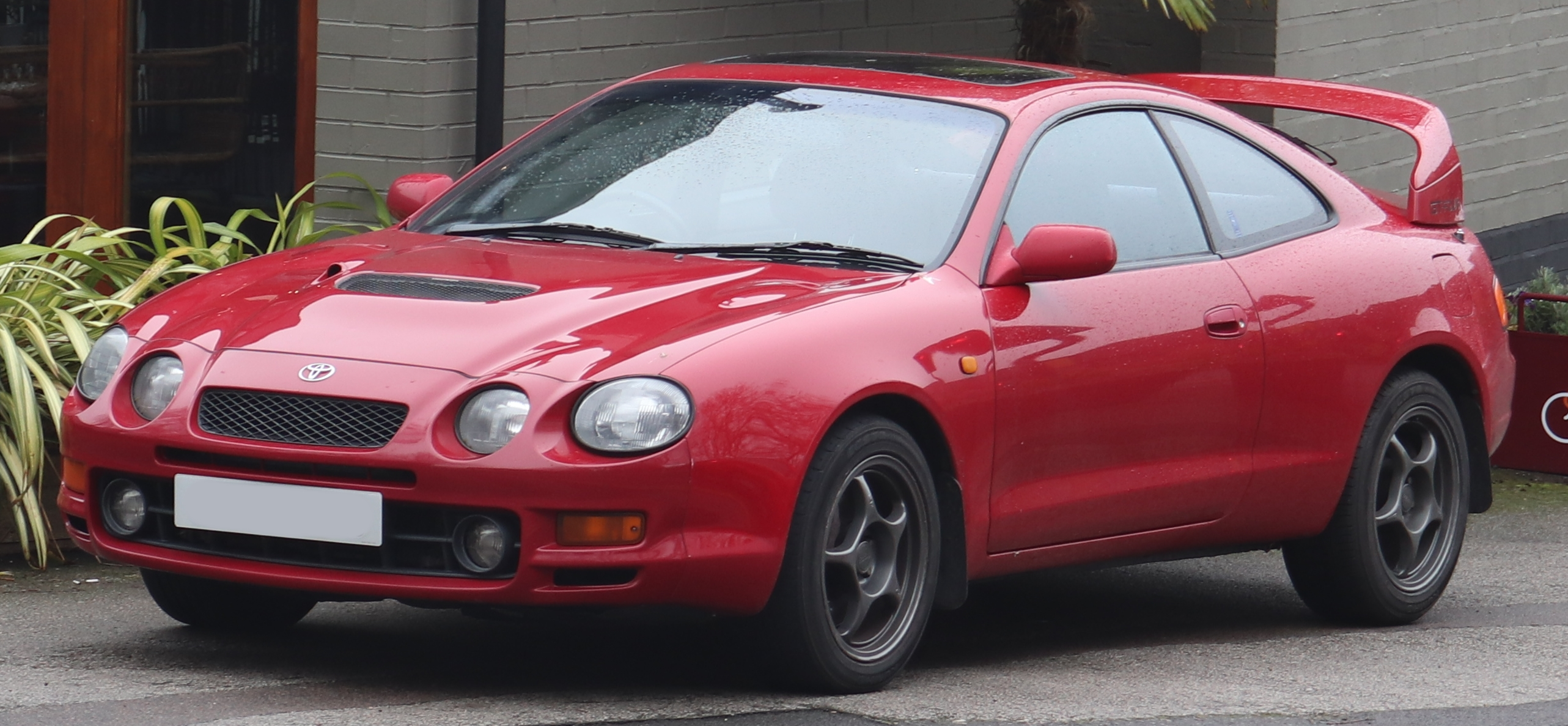
- 1994 Toyota Celica GT-Four (ST205, UK)

Overview
- Manufacturer: Toyota
- Production: December 1970 – April 2006
- Model years: 1971–2005
- Assembly: Japan: Toyota, Aichi (Tsutsumi plant); Tahara, Aichi (Tahara plant); Susono, Shizuoka (Higashi-Fuji plant)

Body and chassis
- Class: Sports car (S)
- Body style: 2-door notchback coupé (1970–1998); 3-door liftback coupé (1973–2006); 2-door convertible (1981–1999)
- Layout: Front-engine, rear-wheel-drive (1970–1985); Front-engine, front-wheel-drive (1985–2006); Front-engine, four-wheel-drive (GT-Four, 1986–1999)

The Toyota Celica (/ˈsɛlɪkə/ or /sɛˈliːkə/) (Japanese: トヨタ・セリカ, Hepburn: Toyota Serika) is an automobile produced by Toyota from 1970 until 2006. The Celica name derives from the Latin word coelica meaning heavenly or celestial. In Japan, the Celica was exclusive to Toyota Corolla Store dealer chain. Produced across seven generations, the Celica was powered by various four-cylinder engines, and body styles included convertibles, liftbacks, and notchback coupé.

In 1973, Toyota coined the term liftback to describe the Celica fastback hatchback, and the GT Liftback would be introduced for the 1976 model year in North America. Like the Ford Mustang, the Celica concept was to attach a coupe body to the chassis and mechanicals from a high volume sedan, in this case the Toyota Carina.

The first three generations of North American market Celicas were powered by variants of Toyota's R series engine. In August 1985, the car's drive layout was changed from rear-wheel drive to front-wheel drive. The all-wheel drive turbocharged models were manufactured from October 1986 to June 1999. Variable valve timing came in certain Japanese models starting from December 1997 and became standard in all models from the 2000 model year. In 1978, a restyled six-cylinder variant was introduced as the Celica Supra (Celica XX in Japan); it would be spun off in 1986 as a separate model, becoming simply the Supra. Lightly altered versions of the Celica were also sold through as the Corona Coupé through the Toyopet dealer network from 1985 to 1989, and as the Toyota Curren through the Vista network from 1994 to 1998.

== First generation (A20, A30; 1970) ==
First generation
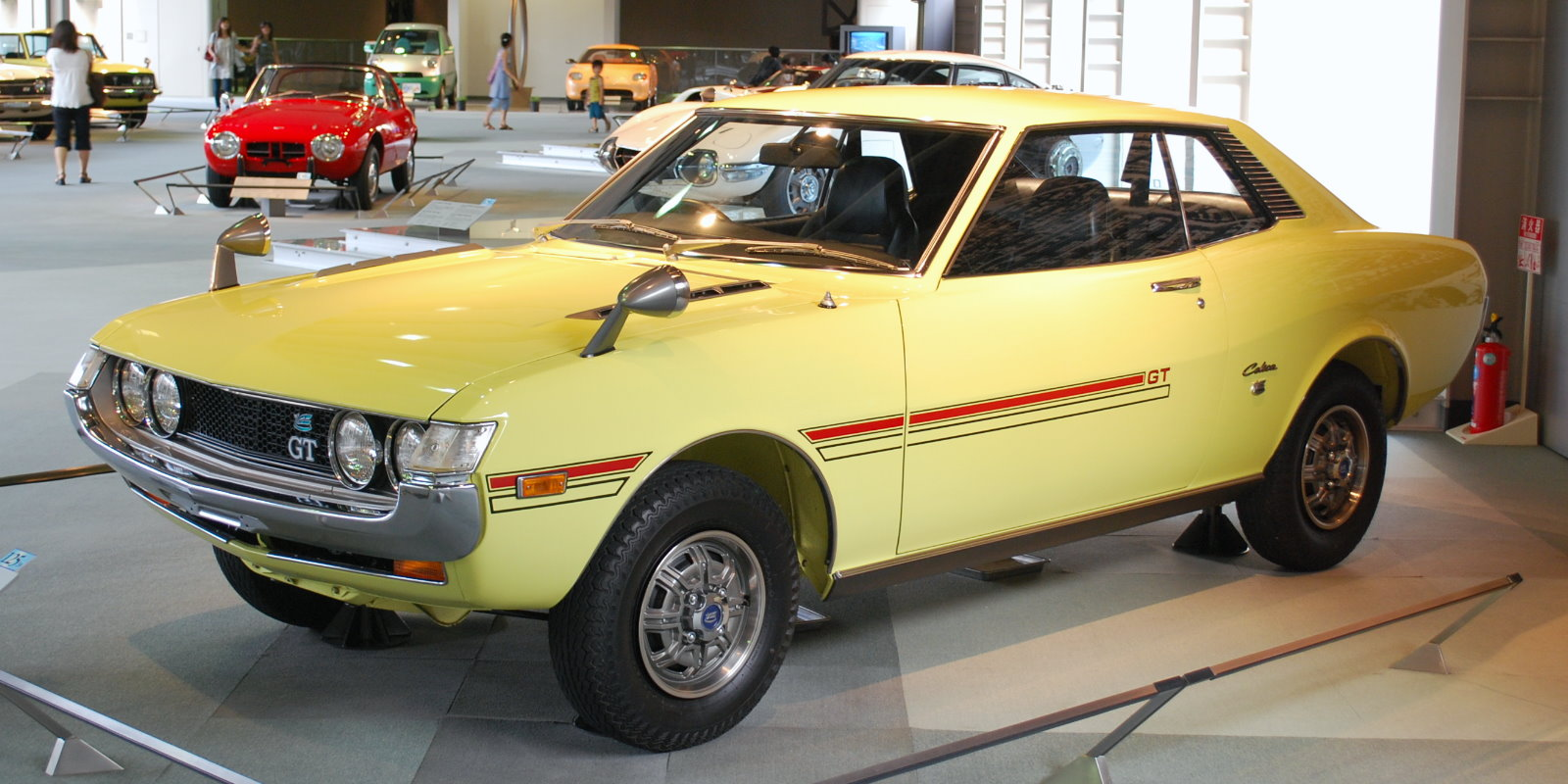
- Toyota Celica coupé 1600 GT (TA22, Japan)

Overview
- Model code: A20; A30
- Production: December 1970 – July 1977
- Designer: Masao Fujita, Tatsuo Hasegawa

Body and chassis
- Class: Sports car
- Body style: 3-door liftback coupé; 2-door hardtop
- Layout: Front-engine, rear-wheel-drive
- Related: Toyota Carina

Powertrain
- Engine: 1.4 L T I4; 1.6 L 2T/2T-B I4; 1.6 L 2T-G Twin Cam I4; 1.9 L 8R I4; 2.0 L 18R I4; 2.0 L 18R-G Twin Cam I4; 2.2 L 20R I4
- Transmission: 4-speed W40 manual; 5-speed W50 manual; 3-speed A40 automatic

Dimensions
- Wheelbase: 2,407 mm (94.75 in)
- Length: 4,170 mm (164.2 in) (pre-facelift), 4,360 mm (171.5 in) (facelift)
- Width: 1,600 mm (63.0 in)
- Height: 1,300 mm (53 in)
- Curb weight: 890–1,186 kg (1,962–2,615 lb)

Displayed at the October 1970 Tokyo Motor Show together with the Toyota Carina and marketed from December of the same year, the Celica was a two-door hardtop coupé that emphasized styling and driving enjoyment. Based on a platform shared with the Carina sedan which is one size above the Toyota Corolla, and a shared size with the Toyota Corona, according to Automobile Magazine, the Celica was based on the Corona platform benefiting from successes with the Toyota 1600GT.

This car was aimed at the North American market and was Toyota's response to the 1964½ Ford Mustang (Pony car) which also was based on the standard sedan with stylized 2+2 bodywork.

In Japan, where different dealer chains handle different models, the Celica was exclusive to Toyota Corolla Store Japanese dealerships as the top-level product. The Celica filled a market position previously held by the 1965–1969 Toyota Sports 800, when Toyota Corolla Store locations were known as Toyota Publica Store and were renamed in 1966 as Toyota Corolla Store.

The initial trim levels offered were ET (1.4L 4-speed), LT, ST (1.6L 4-speed, 5-speed manual, or 3-speed automatic) and GT (1.6L 5-speed) with GTV added in 1972. For export markets the Celica was available in three different trim levels; the LT, ST and GT.

At its introduction the Celica was only available as a pillarless hardtop notchback coupé, adopting "coke bottle styling". The prototype SV-1 Liftback was shown as a concept car at the 1971 Tokyo Motor Show and with slight modifications, the Celica Liftback (LB) was officially launched for the Japanese market in April 1973 as the 2-liter RA25 (18R engine family) and the 1.6-liter TA27 (2T engine family). Model grades were 1600 ST, 1600 GT, 2000 ST, and 2000 GT.

The Liftback model was then exported to many Asian countries and Europe in RHD form as the RA28 or TA28 with either a 18R 2.0-liter or 1.6-liter 2T-B engine. After the October 1975 facelift it was available in both RHD and LHD forms in other markets. The RV-1 "concept" wagon was also shown at the 1971 Tokyo Motor Show but it did not reach production.

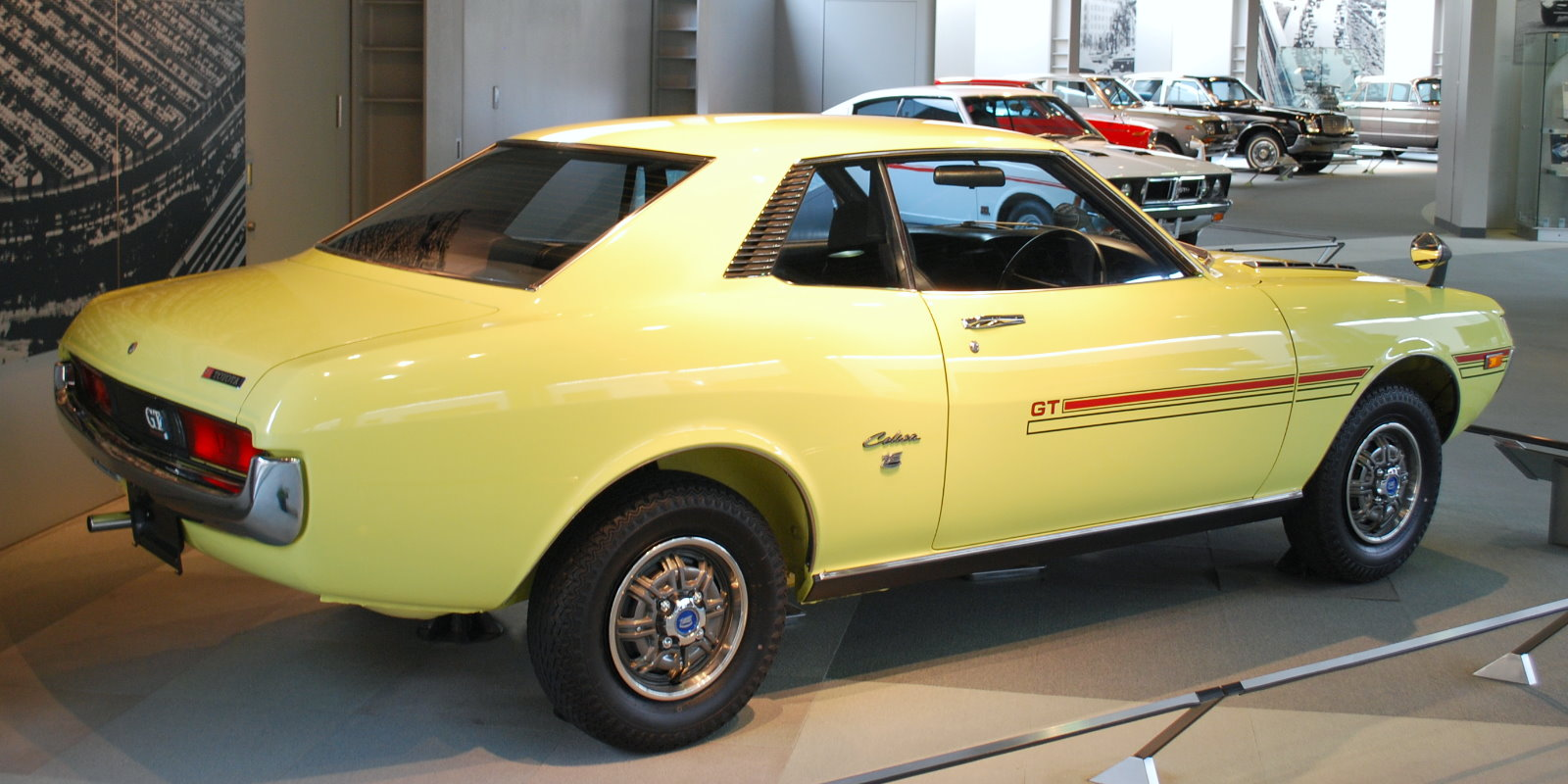
Toyota Celica coupé 1600 GT (TA22, Japan)

The Japanese domestic market GT models had various differences from the ET, LT and ST including the hood flutes, power windows, air conditioning and specific GT trim but shared a few things with the ST—a full-length center console and oil pressure/ammeter gauges—while the LT had warning lights for these functions. With the exception of the American market, the GT had a 1588 cc 2T-G twincam engine or a 1968 cc 18R-G, which not available on the ET, LT or ST and always had 5-speed manual gearbox. Typically for the Japanese market GTs had 18R-G motors that were mated to a Porsche designed closer ratio P51 5 speed gearbox whereas export models had the W-50. For the American market only the GT had only a single cam engine (2000 cc 18R or 2200 cc 20R) with a choice of automatic or 4 speed manual gearboxes on early models then upgrading to the W-50 5 speed in 1974–1977.

There was also the GTV version which introduced in 1972 with slightly less luxurious interior than the GT to reduce weight. The GTV came with the same 2T-G engine, but with a thicker front sway bar & firmer suspension for better handling. Later in 1973 Japanese GTVs had a roof console "OK" monitor with a map light and a cluster of trouble indicators which detected blown brake bulbs, brake fluid level, main fuse & a floor console engine oil temperature gauge.

The first-generation Celicas can be further broken down into two distinctive models. The first of these was the original with slant nose (trapezoid-like shape front corner light). This is for coupe model only, TA22, RA20, RA21 & RA22. These models were produced from 1970 to 1975 and came equipped with the 2T, 2T-G 1.6 liter, or 18R 2.0 liter motor. They had a 95 inches (2,400 mm) wheelbase.

The second series had a flat nose (square front corner light) and slightly longer wheelbase (98 in or 2,500 mm wheelbase). This facelift model appeared in Japan in 1974 but for export was the 1975 model year being TA23, RA23, RA24, RA25, RA28, TA28 & RA29. The Japanese version had engines under 2.0 liters so as to conform to Japanese regulations concerning engine displacement size, thereby allowing buyers to avoid an additional tax for a larger engine. Japanese buyers did pay a higher annual road tax for engines over 1.5 liters while staying under the 2.0 liter threshold.

In some markets, the lower-end LT was equipped with the single carbureted four-cylinder 2T engine displacing 1600 cc, while the ST came with a twin Solex downdraft carburetor 2T-B engine. The 2T-G that powered the high-end GT / GTV model was a DOHC 1600 cc engine equipped with twin Mikuni-Solex Carburetors.

The first Celica for North America, 1971 ST was powered by 1.9 liter 8R engine delivering 108 hp (81 kW) and 117 lb⋅ft (159 N⋅m) . The 1972–1974 models have 2.0 liter 18R-C engines with 97 hp (72 kW) and 106 lb⋅ft (144 N⋅m). For 1975–77, the engine for the North American Celica is the 2.2 liter 20R with 96 hp (72 kW) and 122 lb⋅ft (165 N⋅m). The Celica GT and LT models were introduced in the US for the 1974 model year. The top-line GT included a 5-speed W-50 manual transmission, rocker panel GT stripes and styled steel wheels with chrome trim rings. The North American Celica was equipped with federally mandated safety equipment such as an energy-absorbing steering column and seat belts. These were optional in some overseas markets.

The A40 automatic transmission became an option on North American ST and LT models starting in the 1973 model year. For 1975 the 1974 body was used and sturdier chrome and black rubber bumper bars with horizontally mounted shock absorber mounts (Volvo style) replaced the chrome bumpers used in the earlier cars (in accordance with US Federal bumper laws) mandating impacts without minor damage at 5 mph (8.0 km/h). Unfortunately the early 8R and 18R series engines proved to be less than durable, with early failures common. The 1974 18R-C engine's durability was improved somewhat, but the 20R introduced for 1975 proved to be a better engine in most respects.

=== 1972 update ===
In August 1972 the Celica's tail lights were updated from one-piece tail lights (affectionately called one-tail or flat lights) to tail lights with distinctive raised brake & turn signal "bubble" lenses. The rear center panel was also redesigned as the fuel tank was moved from the trunk bottom to behind the rear seats and the fuel filler was moved from a concealed location between the tail lights to the left "C" pillar. Other changes included changes to the front and rear badges, the relocation of the towing hooks, changes to the color of the fender mirrors (on cars equipped with sports type mirrors) and changes to the center console on ST and GT models.

=== 1974 update ===
In January 1974, the Japanese market Celica hardtop coupé received a facelift with a different front-end treatment of a flat nose, new hood, and front fenders which were similar to, but not interchangeable with later model Celica.

In mid-1974, for the 1975 model year, the North American spec Celica retained the earlier body but received federally mandated 5 mph bumpers front and rear. Body-color urethane panels filled in the spaces previously occupied by the smaller chrome bumpers. This style of bumpers were used in North America until the end of this generation in 1977. Japan also used these bumpers for the Liftback GT, but not lesser grades or the coupe, from 1976 to 1977.

Other changes done during the 1974 model year included the introduction of flared wheel arches, another change in the style of the badges and the introduction of a new style of rear quarter vents.

=== 1976 update ===
1976 brought the largest update to the model. The wheelbase of the car was increased and the car featured various difference both externally and internally. Externally the most noticeable difference is the flat front end (similar to earlier JDM models), the elimination of the removable hood vents (replaced by vents formed in the hood pressing) and the single cowl vent which replaced the twin vents on earlier models. Internally the cars also feature a different dash, seats and carpets. The liftback version also included these changes.

=== Liftback ===
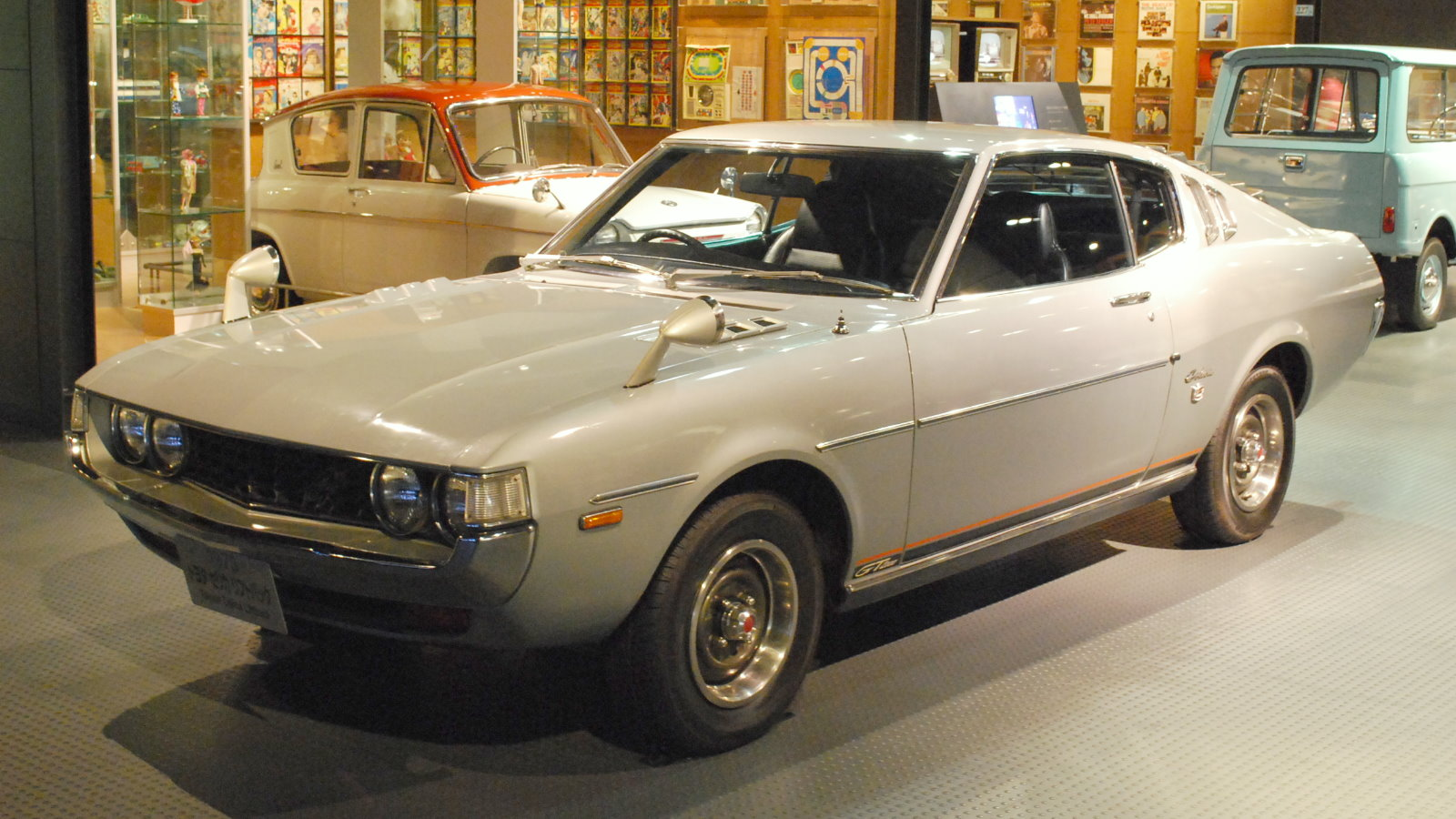
1973 Toyota Celica Liftback 2000 GT (RA25, Japan)

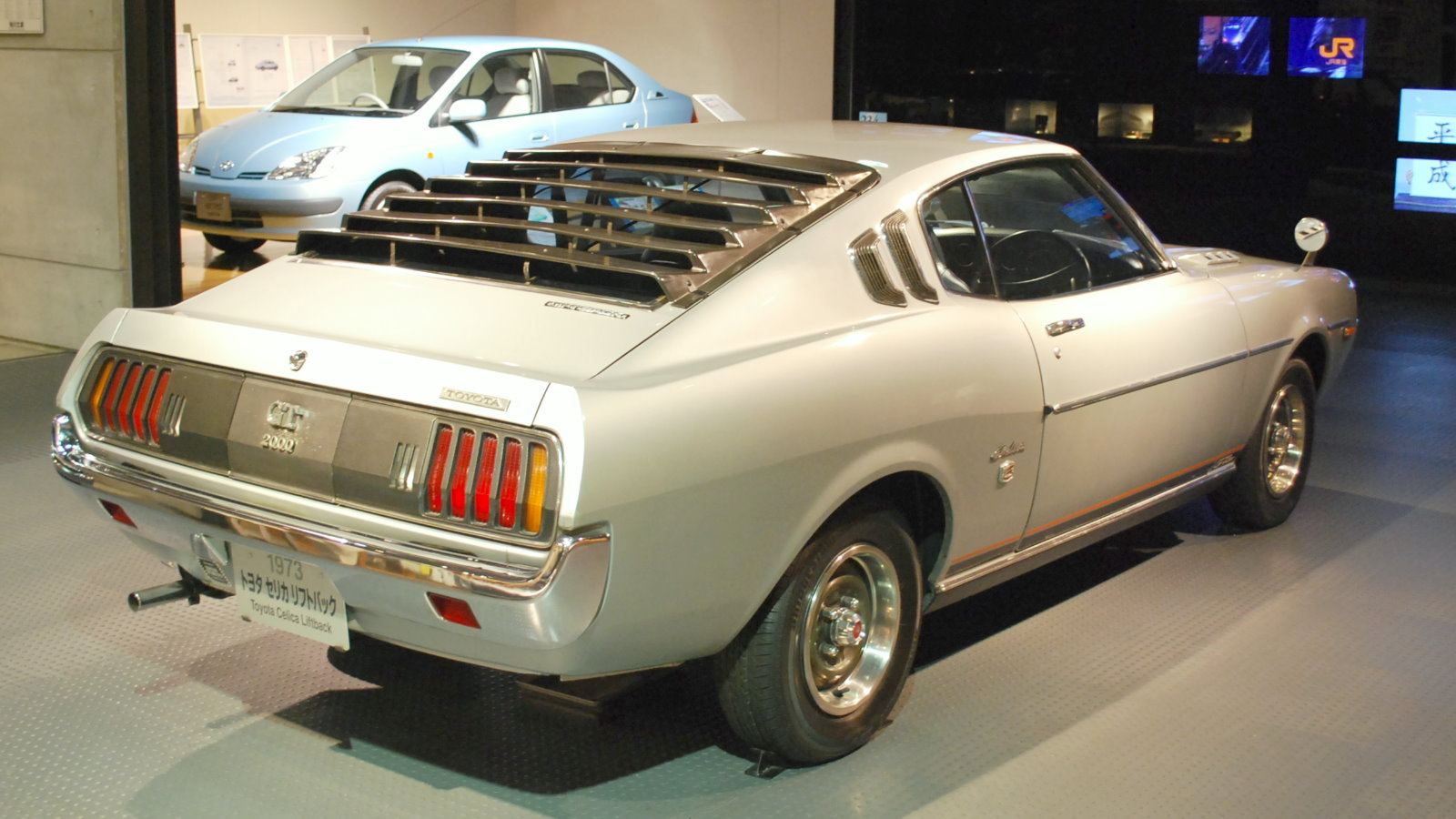
1973 Toyota Celica Liftback 2000 GT (RA25, Japan)

The fastback-styled hatchback, called the Liftback by Toyota, was introduced for the Japanese market in April 1973 but not until July 1974 for export models. Models for the Japanese domestic market Liftback were the 1600 ST, 1600 GT (TA27), 2000 ST, and 2000 GT (RA25 and RA28). The North American liftback (RA29) was only offered with a 2.2-liter 20R engine for the 1976 and 1977 model year. All the liftback models have flat noses. Although there is no "B" pillar in the Liftback, the rear quarter windows are fixed in place and do not roll down (as they do in the hardtop coupe).

The Liftback was often called the Japanese Mustang or the Mustang Celica. The liftback styling was largely inspired by the 1969 Ford Mustang fastback, including C-pillar louvers and the vertical bar tail lights that are a signature Mustang styling cue and pay overall homages to the muscle-car era.

=== Facelift export models ===
From its 1971 introduction in North America until the 1973 model year, the Celica retained its original styling and trim, and was sold only in ST trim. The tri-color taillights with the "bubble" style arrived for 1973, and continued into early 1974. Mid-1974, the trim was slightly revised. The original Celica quarter panel script was changed to a bold block-letter font, the "C" pillar trim was restyled with a more modern look, and GT logos switched to a bold serif font. The GT was the first American Celica to include a 5-speed overdrive transmission as standard, along with an FM/AM radio, leather-wrapped 4-spoke steering wheel, GT rocker panel stripes, styled steel wheels with bright trim rings, and 70-series radial tires. 1974 saw the introduction of the LT to North America. It was similarly equipped as the ST and lasted through the 1975 model year.

For the 1975 model year, US spec Celicas retained the 1974 body but received federally mandated 5-mph bumpers front and rear. Body-color urethane panels filled in the cutouts previously occupied by the smaller chrome bumpers.

In October 1975, the entire Celica lineup was given a facelift with a revised front bumper and grille. The new model codes for facelift hardtop coupe were RA23 for the general worldwide market with an 18R engine or RA24 for America with a 20R engine. The Liftbacks were coded RA28 and TA28 (global markets) or RA29 for the US. Also available was the TA23, which was similar to the RA23 but with the 2T engine and the TA28 offered with the 2T-B. The Toyota Celica Liftback GT won Motor Trend Car of the Year (Imported Vehicle) in 1976.

The Celica RA23, TA23, RA28, and TA28 had a more distinctive bulged hood which was lacking in the TA22 or RA20/21 coupé and in the TA27 and RA25 Liftback but was factory in 1975 on the North American RA22 Celica to accommodate the larger 20R motor. The TA22 Celica also had removable vents mounted in the hood which the RA23 and RA28 lacked, while the TA27 and RA25 models had three raised fluted vents inset into the hood. The RA series also had an elongated nose to accommodate the larger engine. The hood vents, fuel filler cap and interior options were also different between the TA and RA series across the model range. The 1976–77 North American Celicas lost their ammeter and oil pressure gauges; they were replaced by warning lamps in the gauge cluster.

Up until 1976, US Celicas got either wheel covers (ST, LT) or styled steel wheels with trim rings (GT) in the 13-inch size. Starting in 1976, all Celicas got 14-inch styled steel wheels, with trim rings (GT) or without them (ST and LT).

For 1976–1977, the non-US GT Liftback was also available with the 18R-G twincam engine with a Yamaha head and running gear. This engine produced significantly more power than the single-cam 18R. Peak power was about 100 kW (134 hp) at 6000 rpm.

In Australia, the 1971 TA22 Celica was first released with the 1.6-liter 2T motor, as well as the TA23 in the mid-1975 and the RA23 in 1976 with only 2000 1977 RA28s being imported, all with the 2.0-liter 18R-C motor. The only two GTs ever imported by the AMI (Australian Motor Industries) which later became Toyota Australia, were a 1971 red TA22 GT and a brown 1973 RA25 GT. These vehicles were a special import by Ken Hougham the managing director of AMI for evaluation. Just like the TA22 GT, the RA25 GT model was never imported due to the power to weight ratio and higher insurance for the twin-cam motor all of which quickly halted any notion of the GTs becoming a staple in the Celica family in Australia.

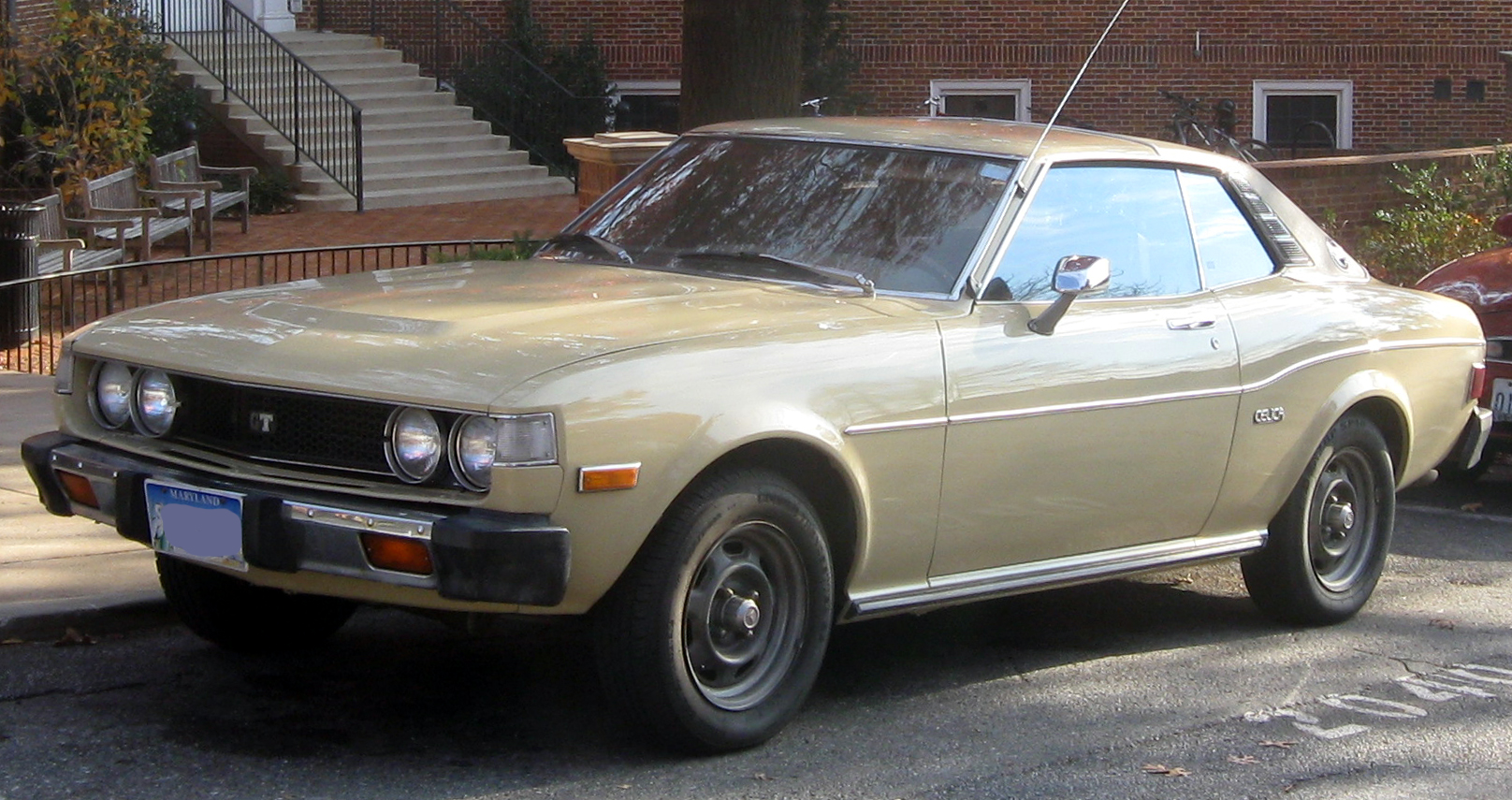
1976 Toyota Celica coupé GT (RA24, US). Note the enlarged bumpers, required by US federal law.

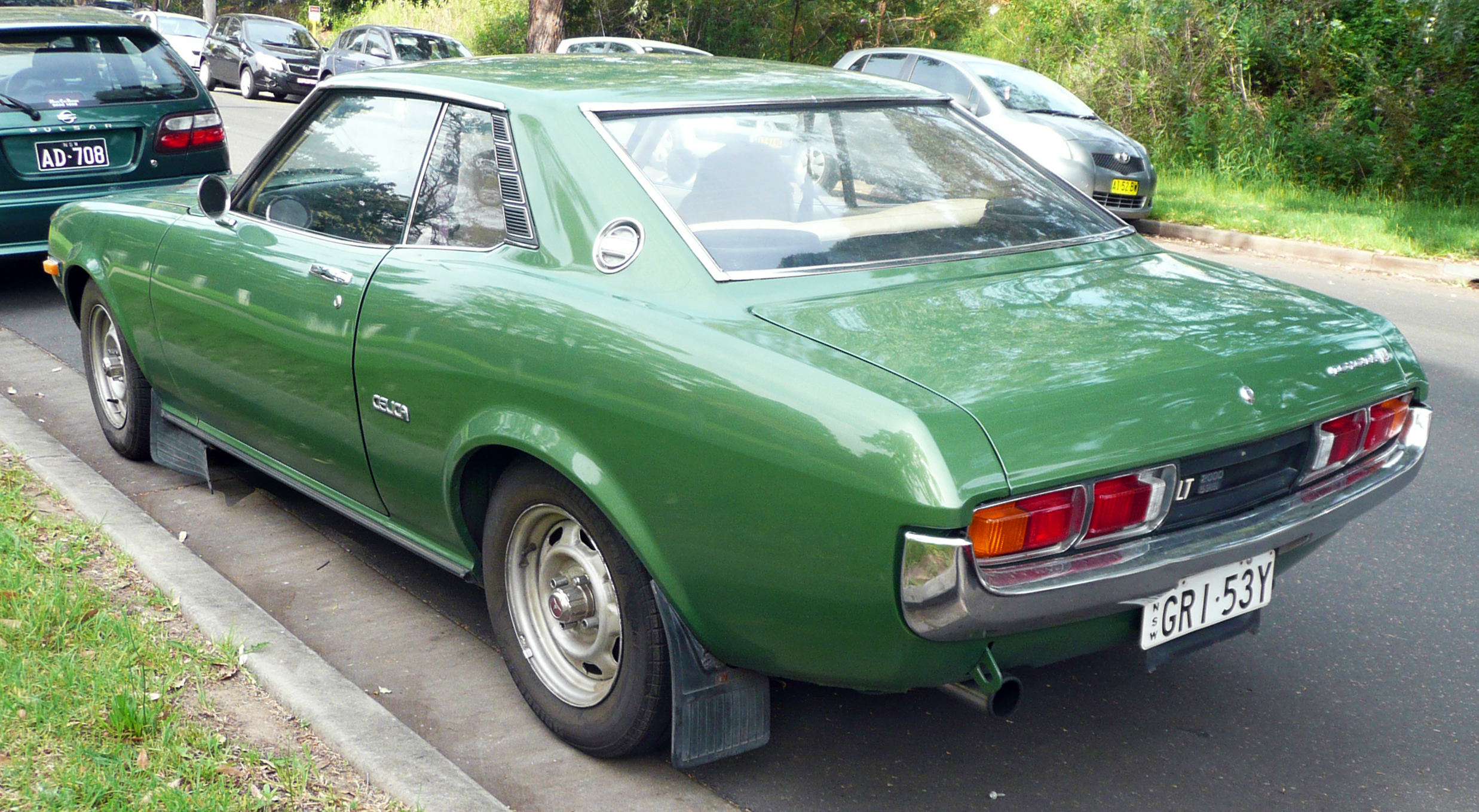
1976–1977 Toyota Celica Hardtop coupé 2000 LT (RA23, Australia)

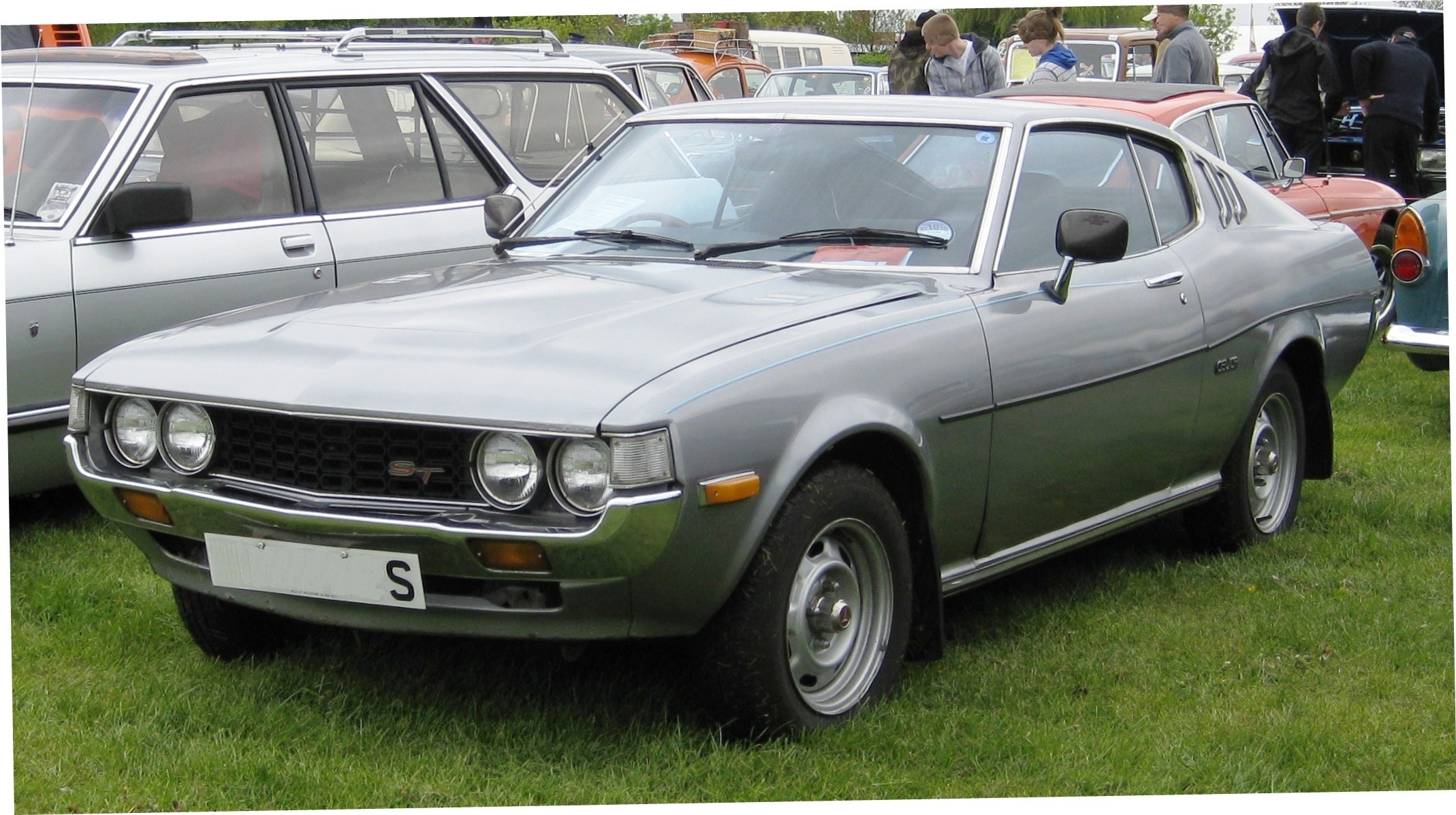
1976 Toyota Celica Liftback 2000 ST (RA28, UK)

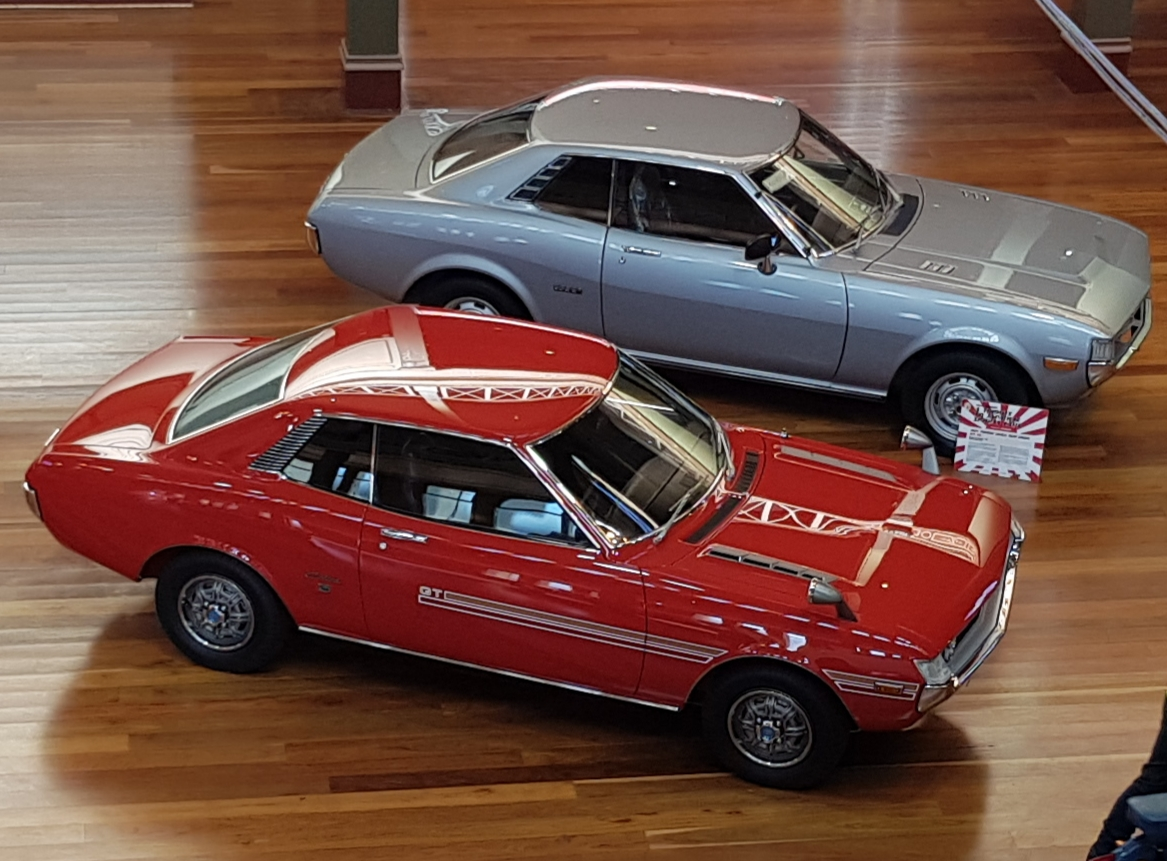
1971 red Toyota Celica GT, a show winner at the Australian Motorclassica Concours d’elegance, and a facelift silver LT.

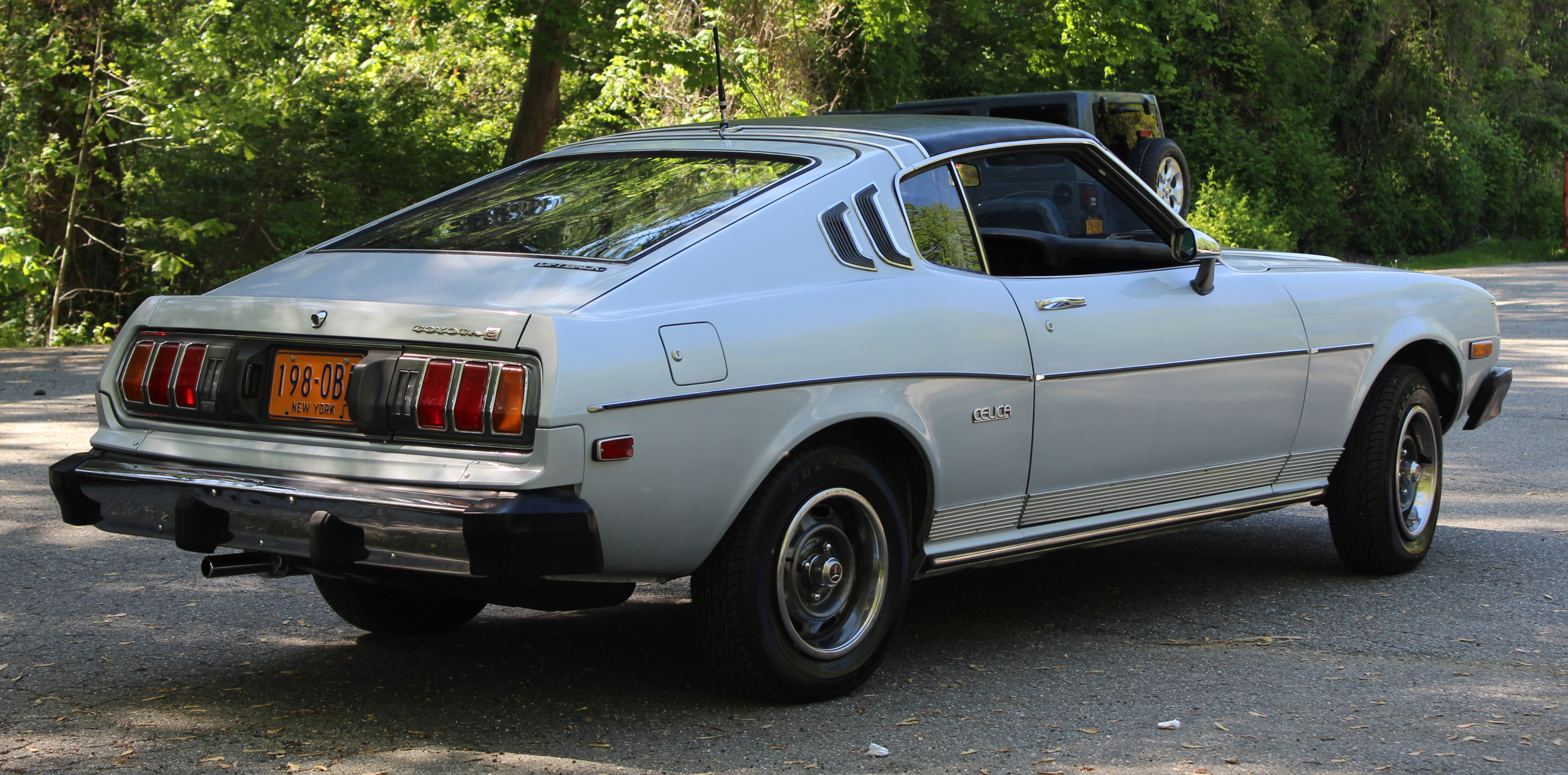
1977 Toyota Celica Liftback 2200 GT (RA29, US). Note the enlarged bumpers, required by US federal law.

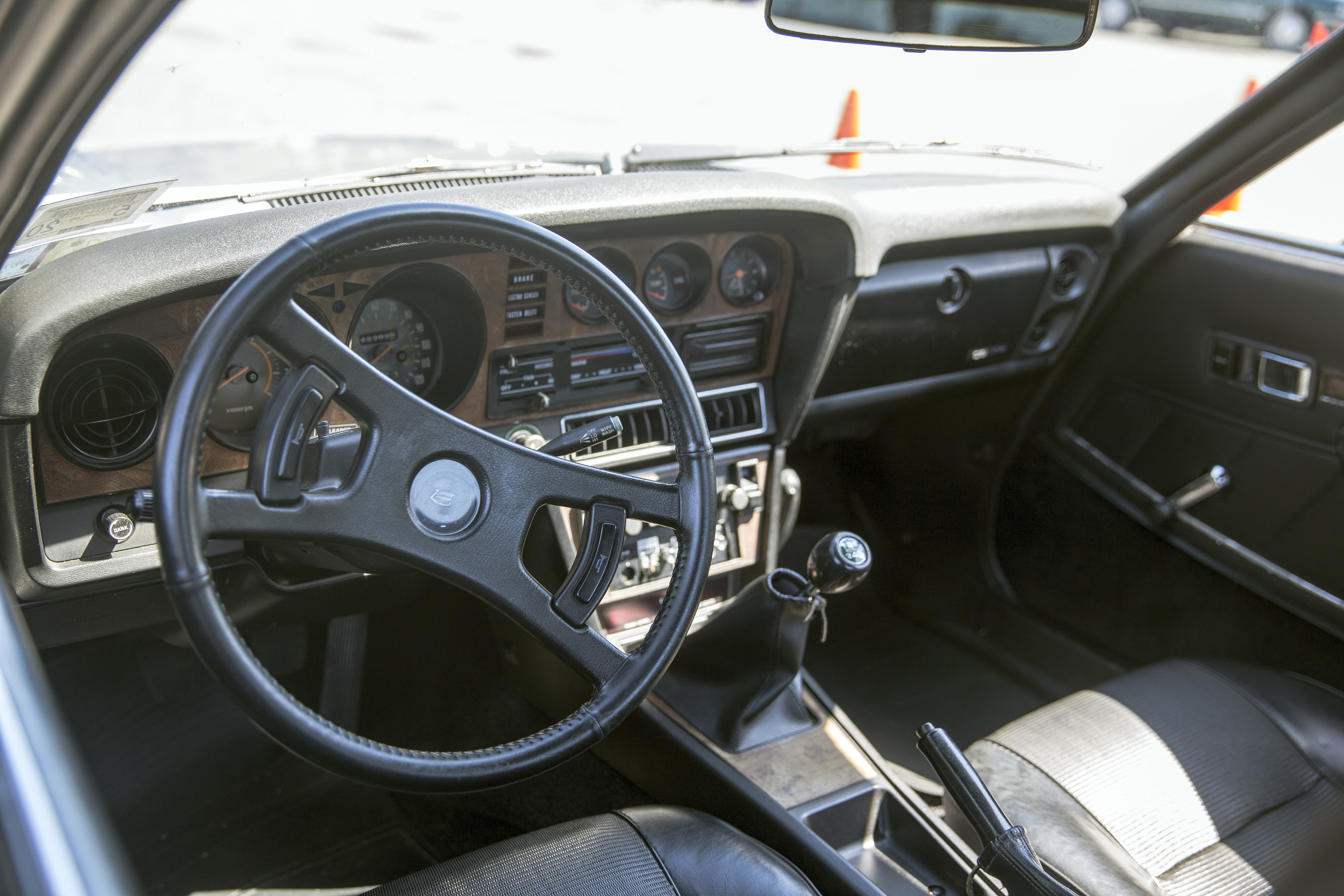
1977 Toyota Celica Liftback GT interior

== Second generation (A40, A50; 1977) ==
Second generation
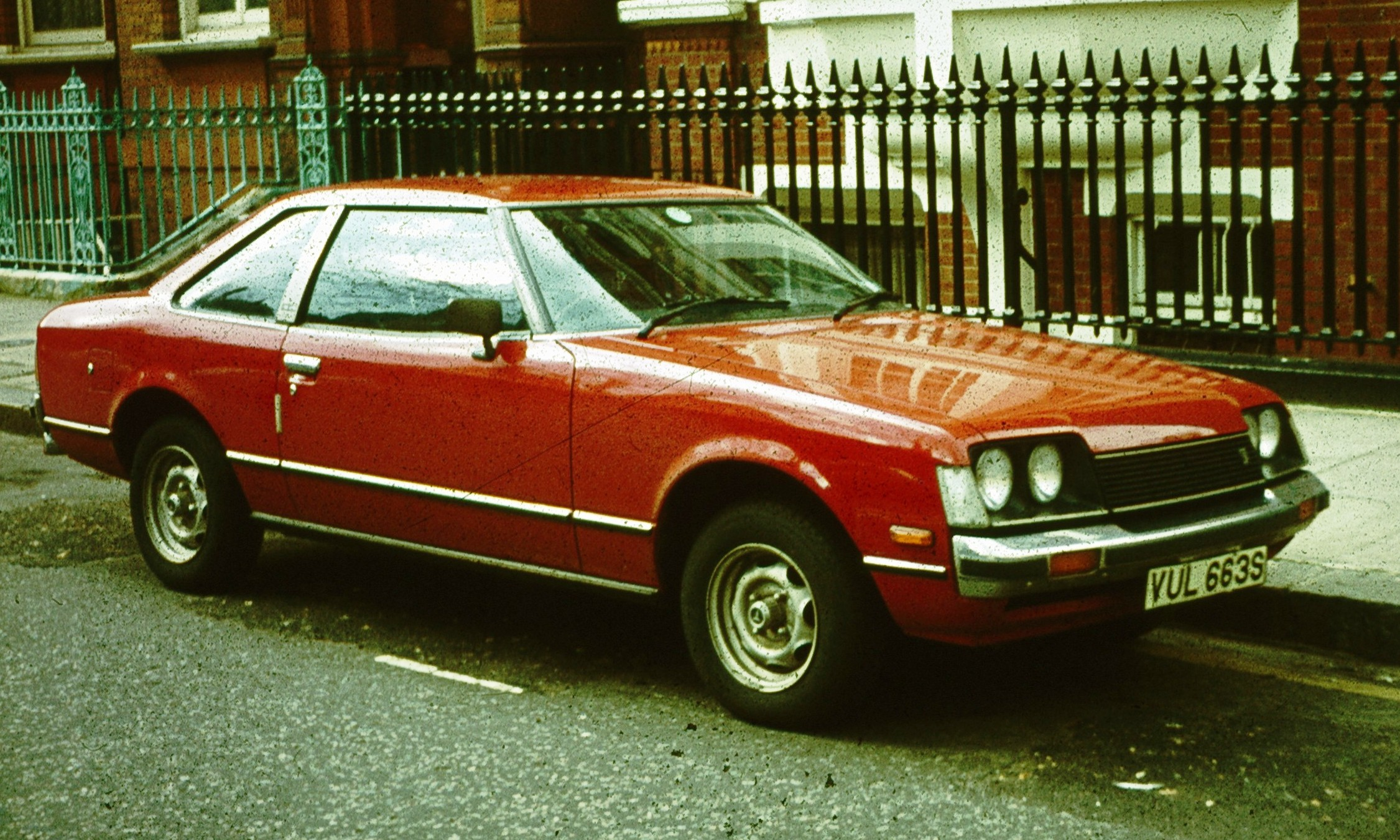
- Pre-facelift Toyota Celica 1600 ST Coupé (TA40, UK)

Overview
- Model code: A40; A50
- Production: August 1977 – July 1981
- Designer: David Stollery

Body and chassis
- Class: Sports car
- Body style: 2-door notchback coupé; 3-door liftback coupé
- Layout: Front-engine, rear-wheel-drive
- Related: Toyota Supra (A40, A50); Toyota Carina (A40, A50)

Powertrain
- Engine: 1588 cc 2T & 2T-G I4 (TA40/45); 1588 cc 12T I4 (TA41); 1770 cc 3T I4 (TA42); 1770 cc 13T I4 (TA46/47); 1968 cc 18R & 18R-G I4 (RA40/45/55); 1972 cc 21R I4 (RA46); 2189 cc 20R I4 (RA42); 2366 cc 22R I4 (RA43)
- Transmission: 3-speed A40 automatic ('78–'80); 4-speed A40D automatic ('81); 5-speed W50 manual; 5-speed W55 manual ('81)

Dimensions
- Wheelbase: 2,500 mm (98.4 in)
- Length: 4,410 mm (173.6 in)
- Width: 1,640 mm (64.6 in)
- Height: 1,310 mm (51.6 in)
- Curb weight: 1,055 kg (2,326 lb)

Pre-facelift Toyota Celica 2200 GT Liftback (RA42, US)

The second-generation Celica was released for the 1978 model year (production began in August 1977) and was again available in both notchback coupé and Liftback forms. It was designed in Toyota's Calty Design Research studio in California. David Stollery was responsible for its design. The coupé was no longer a true hardtop; both coupé and Liftback had frameless door glass but featured a thick "B" pillar. The glass areas were significantly increased over the original version, 26% larger for the coupé and 35% larger for the liftback. The A40 Celica was also the first Japanese production car to feature glass which curved in all three dimensions.

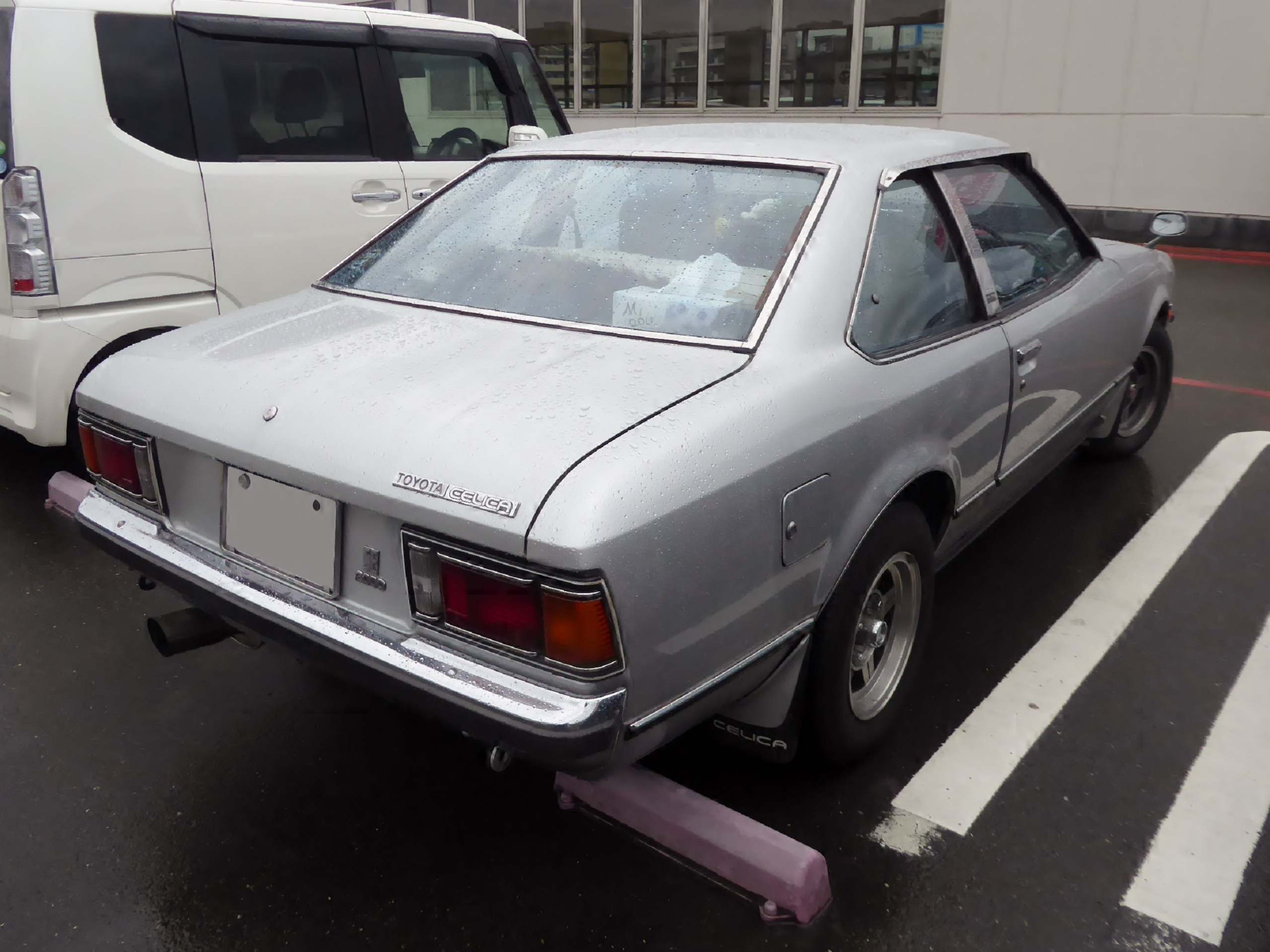
Pre-facelift Toyota Celica Coupé 2000 SE (RA46, Japan)

The early or pre-facelift second-generation Celica was released with round headlights and chrome bumpers for lower grades. The higher grades such as the Japanese GT and all US models have black rubber bumpers. The facelift was launched in August 1979 came with square headlights and revised tail lights. They came with chrome bumpers with rubber protectors on each corners, or for certain models with all polyurethane black bumpers such on the Japanese GT and all US spec cars. The facelift model front end was not only featured square headlights, but also came with new grille, and revised hood and fenders which were not interchangeable with the parts of pre-facelift model. This generation offered as standard equipment a new windshield wiper and headlight switch installation, with the controls operated by levers attached to the steering column.

From 1979 until 1981 the Griffith company in the US offered a Targa-style convertible conversion to the coupé. They were called the Sunchaser and had a removable Targa top and a folding rear roof, much like the '67 Porsche 911 soft-window Targa. These were Toyota approved and sold through Toyota dealers. Over 2,000 were produced. In Germany, the same Sunchaser version but also a full convertible and a traditional targa with a fixed rear window (called the TX22) were offered. Conversions were Toyota-approved and carried out from mid-1980 by a company called Tropic.

=== Markets ===
==== Japan ====
There were about 70 different variants of second-generation Celica sold in Japan over the model's lifetime. With the combination of Coupé and Liftback body styles, and the choice of different engine, trim levels, manual or automatic transmission, initially there were 64 different models offered at the introduction time. The Japanese model grades were ET, LT, ST, SE, XT, GT, and GTV. The high-performance GT and GTV were powered by the 1.6-liter 2T-GEU, or 2.0-liter 18R-GU Twincam engine.

In August 1978, the Celica line up was revised to have only 49 different models. The new model was the 1800 ST-EFI with the 1.8-liter 3T-EU engine. The 1600 ET with 4-speed manual transmission, 1800 LT, and 2000 ST were discontinued. The GTV was replaced by the GT-Rally, a limited-edition model that had a 1.6-liter 2T-GEU or 2.0-liter 18R-GEU engine, special grille, special bumpers, black interior with red or yellow stripes (against the norm of beige-colored interiors of the time) and was only available in white, red, metallic black, and lime green paint.

==== North America ====
North American models were powered by a 2.2 L SOHC 20R 4-cylinder engine developing 96 hp (72 kW) and 120 lb⋅ft (163 N⋅m) for both ST and GT models. This new generation offered more safety, power and fuel economy than previous models and was awarded Motor Trend's Import Car of the Year for 1978.

In 1980, the limited edition US Grand Prix GT Liftback was offered due to Toyota's connection to the US Grand Prix West in Long Beach, California. For 1981, the North American models were given a bigger 2.4-liter SOHC 22R 4-cylinder engine producing 97 hp (72 kW) and 128 lb⋅ft (174 N⋅m), which was simultaneously fitted to the Pickup. To celebrate the Celica 10th Anniversary, the GTA coupe was released. This was basically a GT coupe with a four-speed automatic transmission, Supra style interior, power windows, upgraded sound system and alloy wheels. The GTA is distinguishable by its copper brown / beige two-tone paint and a "GTA 10th anniversary" plaque on the center console.

The Canadian models were similar to the US models, but the Liftback was also offered in the more affordable ST trim, instead only the higher GT trim in the US.

==== Australia ====
In Australia, the new Celica was less sporty than earlier models. The only engine available was the 2-liter 18R, producing 66.4 kW (90 PS), hooked up to a five-speed manual or a three-speed automatic. The suspension was also quite soft and the recirculating ball steering came in for some criticism for its vagueness. Both the coupé and the liftback bodywork were available in Australia.

==== Europe ====
Across Europe, the Celica was offered with the 1.6-liter, 2.0-liter, and 2.0-liter Twincam engines. Trim levels were 1600 LT, 1600 ST, 1600 GT, 2000 ST, 2000 XT, and 2000 GT.

=== Gallery ===
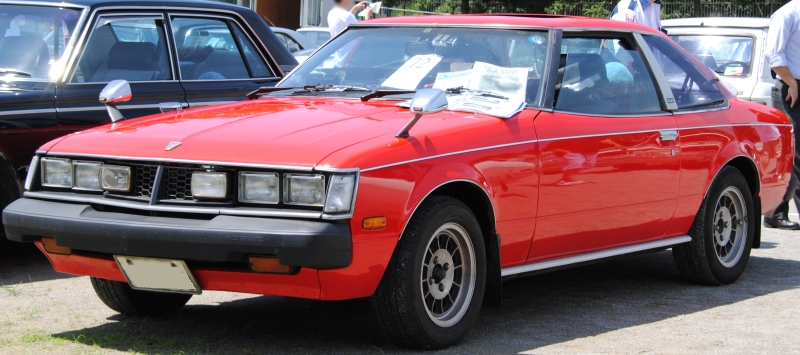
The facelift model Toyota Celica GT Coupé (Japan)

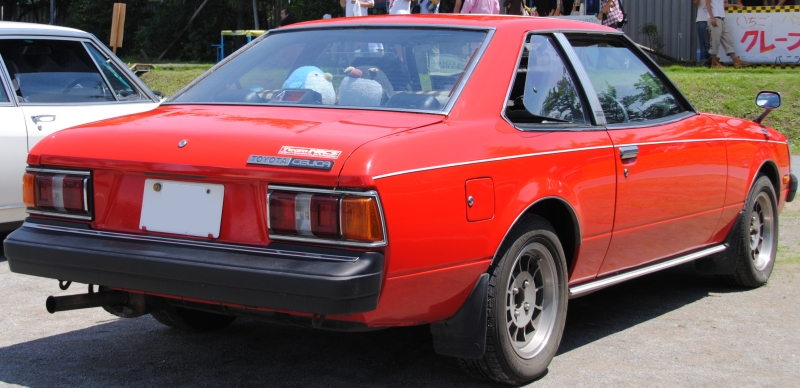
The facelift model Toyota Celica GT Coupé (Japan)

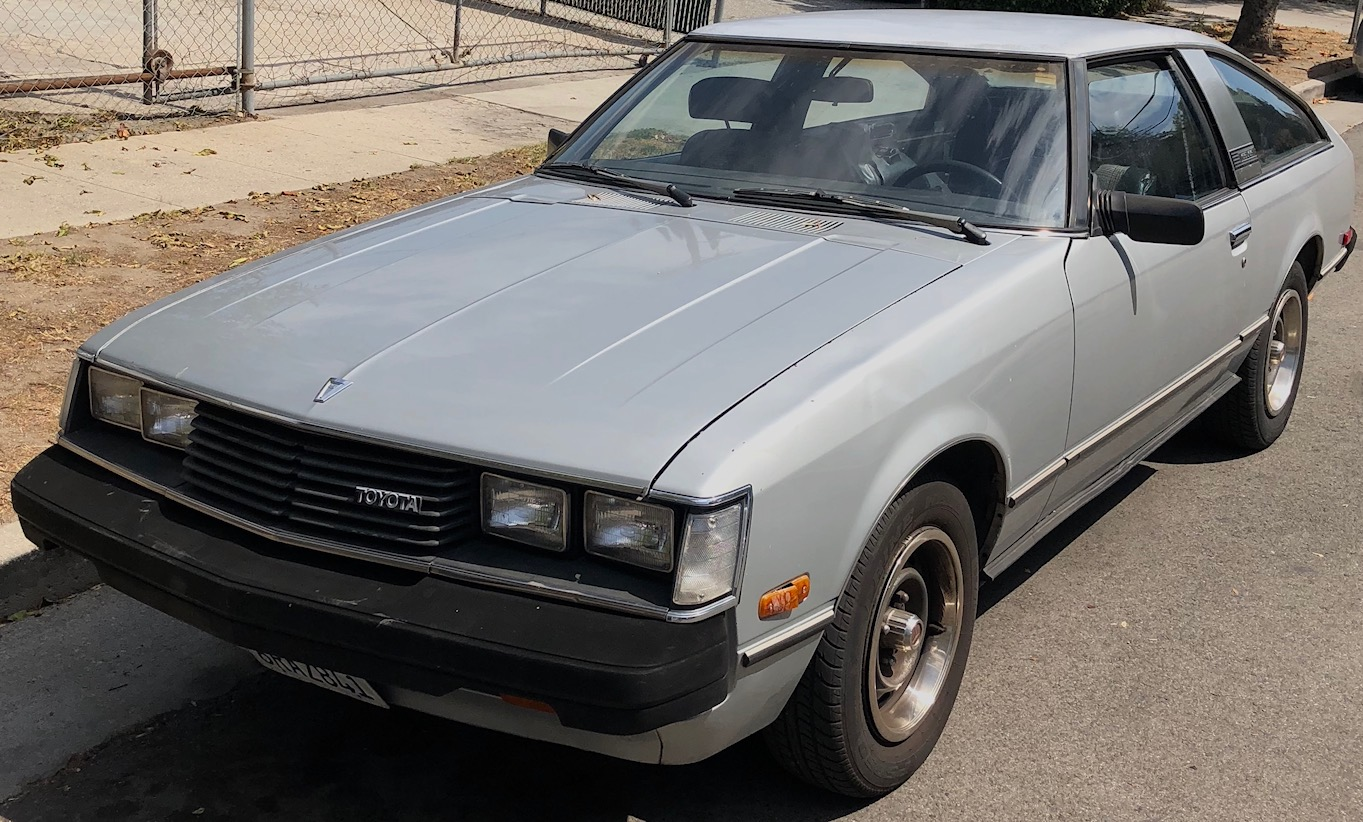
The facelift model Toyota Celica 2200 GT Liftback (RA42, US)

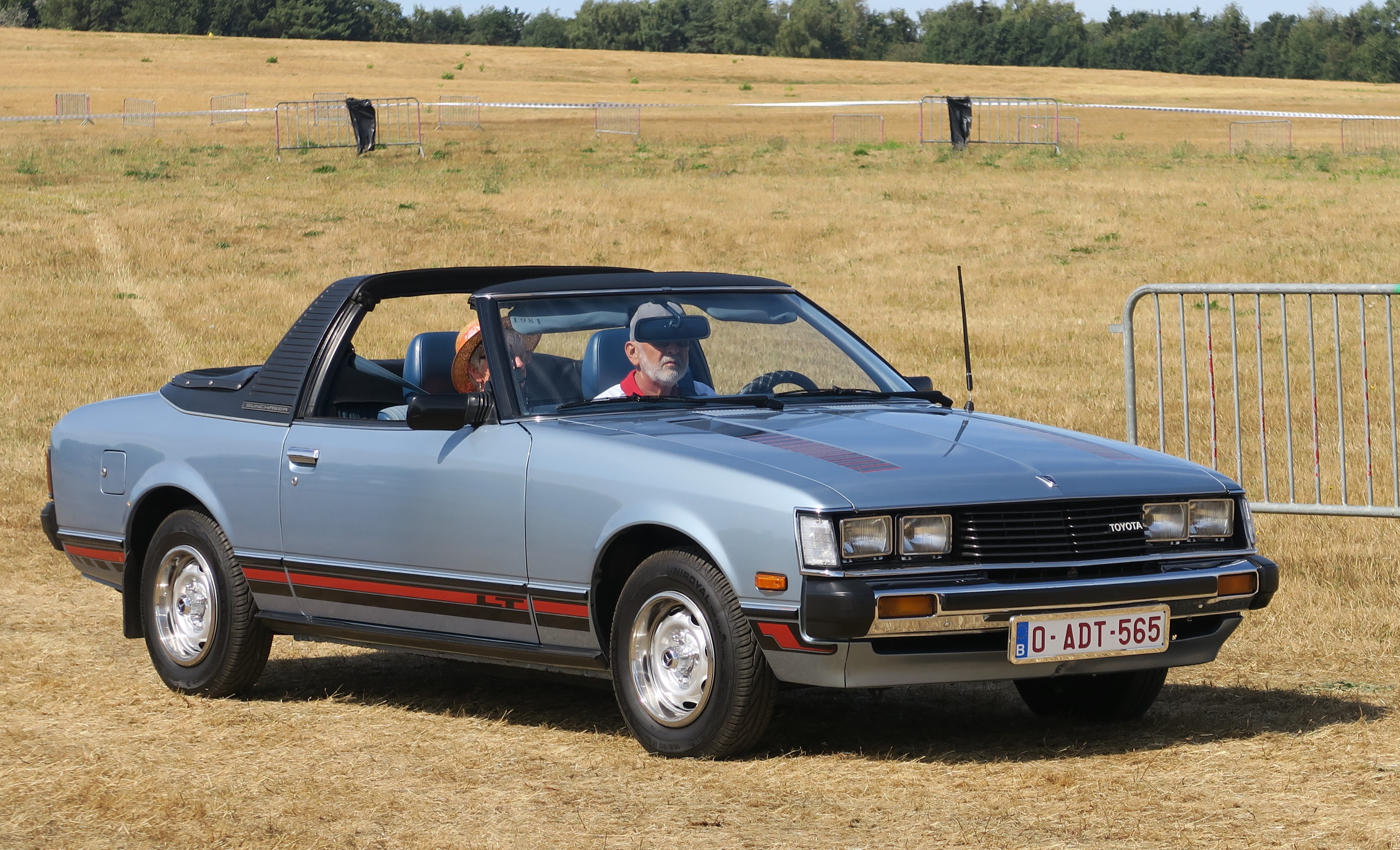
The facelift model Toyota Celica 1600 LT Sunchaser Convertible (TA40, Europe)

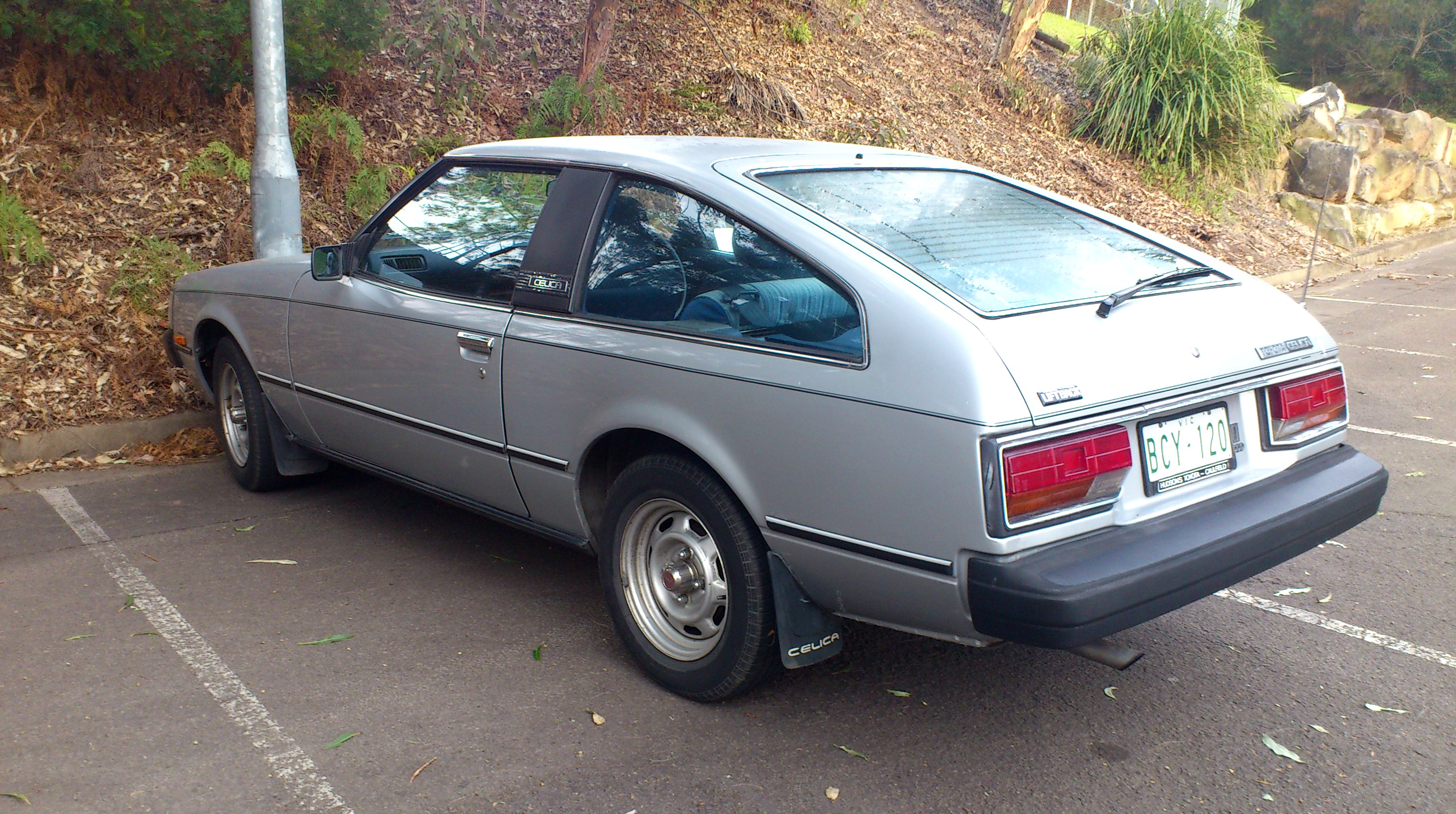
The facelift model Toyota Celica 2000 LT Liftback (RA40, Australia)

=== Celica XX/Celica Supra ===
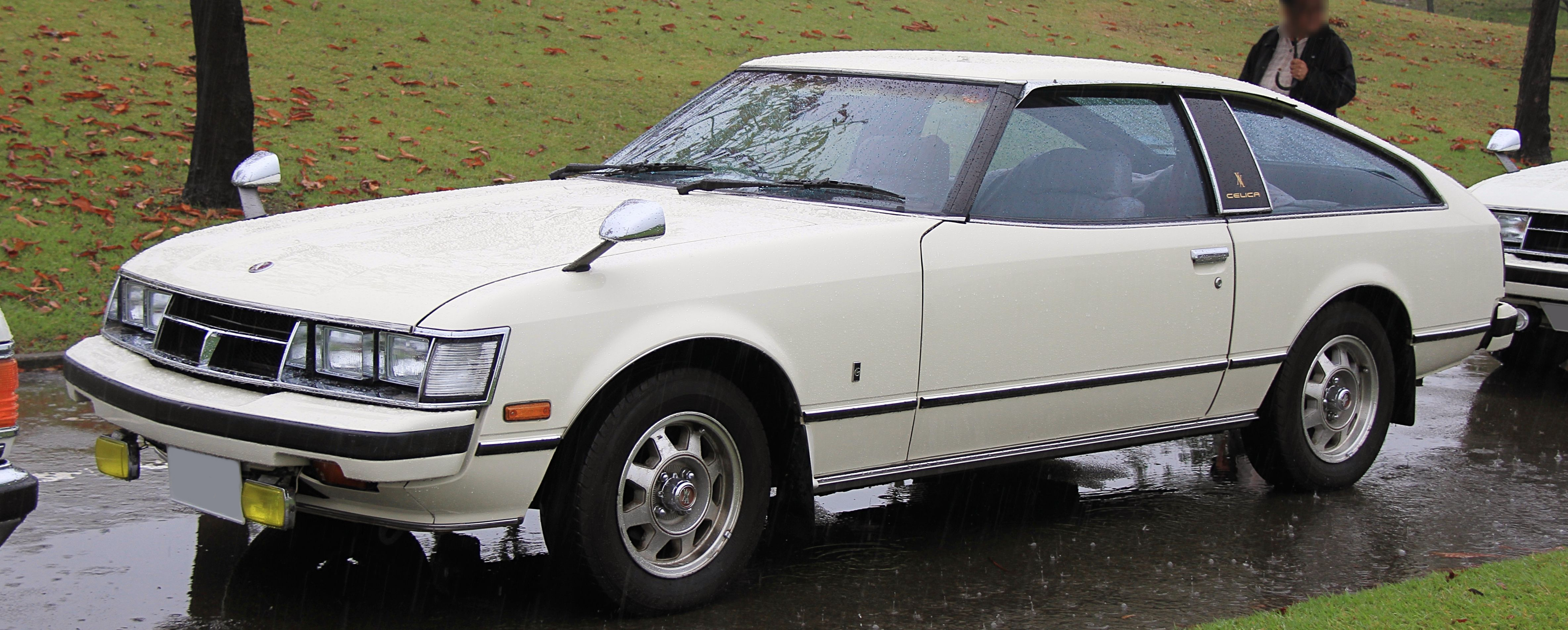
1979 Toyota Celica XX 2000G (Japan)

In April 1978 Toyota began production of the Mark I Toyota Supra in Japan, as the Toyota Celica XX. It debuted in the United States as the Toyota Celica Supra for the 1979 model year. The US Mark I (chassis code MA46) was originally equipped with a 110 hp (82 kW) 2.6 L (2563 cc) 12-valve SOHC straight-six engine (4M-E). Simultaneously the Japanese Celica XX (chassis code MA45) was offered with a 140 PS (103 kW) version of the 2.6 or with a 125 PS (92 kW) 2.0 L 12-valve SOHC inline-six engine (M-EU).

=== Celica Camry ===
Toyota launched the Celica Camry, a four-door sedan, in the Japanese market during January 1980. This model is a derivative of the second-generation 1977–1981 Toyota Carina (A40 and A50) with front-end styling resembling that of the contemporary Celica XX. Neither a coupe nor a liftback body was offered. Toyota replaced the Celica Camry with the front-wheel drive Toyota Camry (V10) in 1982.

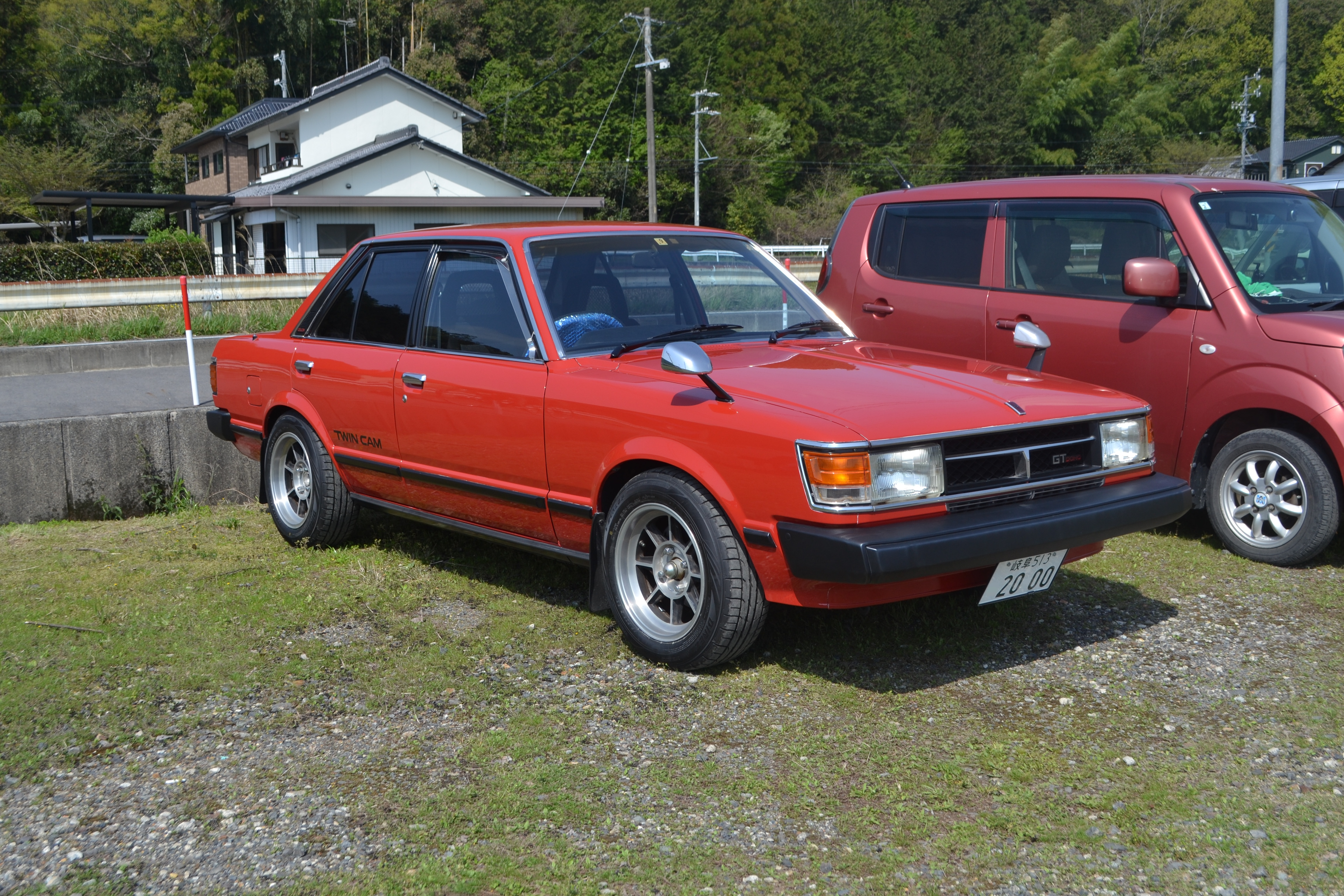
Toyota Celica Camry 2000 GT (Japan)

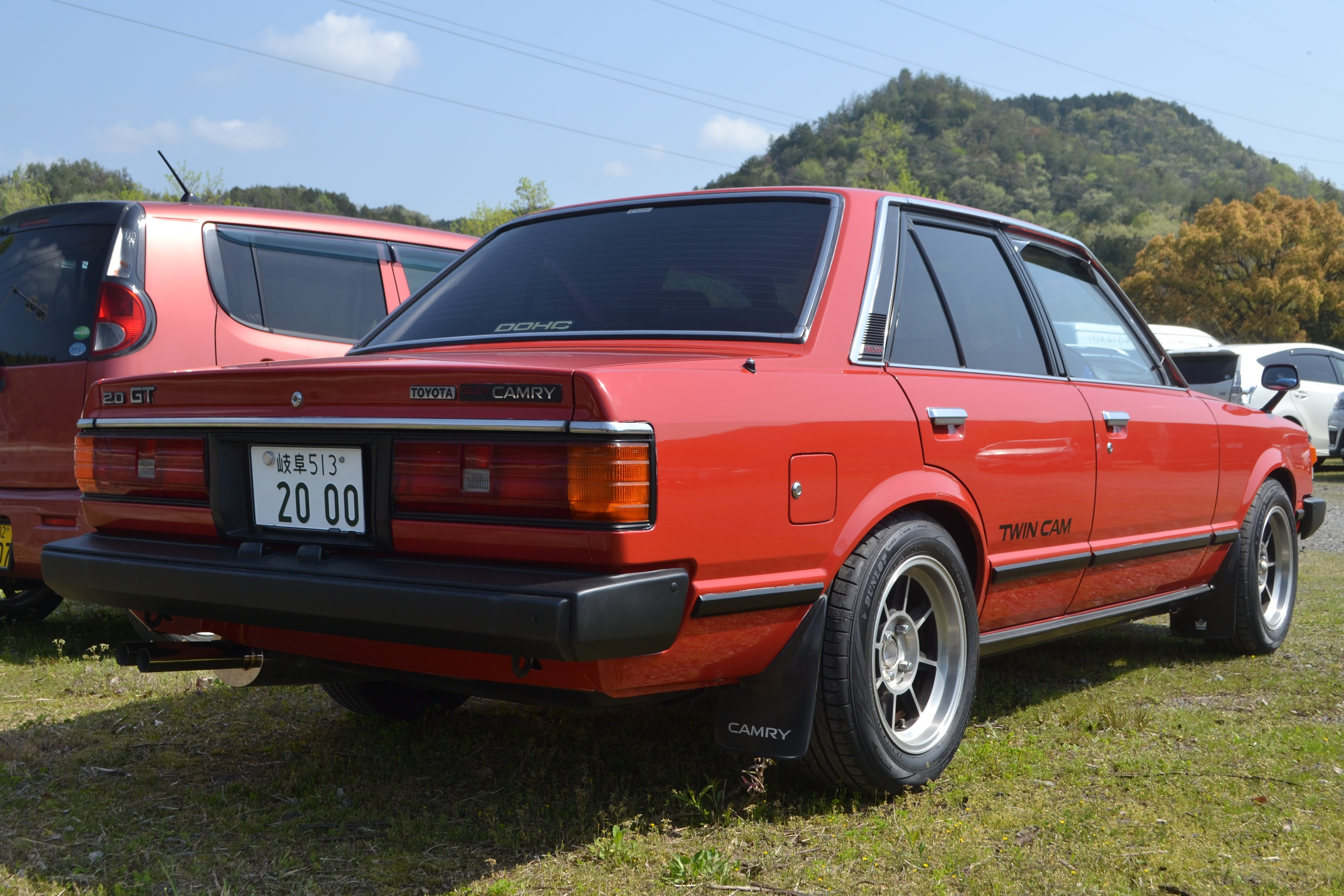
Toyota Celica Camry 2000 GT (Japan)

== Third generation (A60; 1981) ==
Third generation
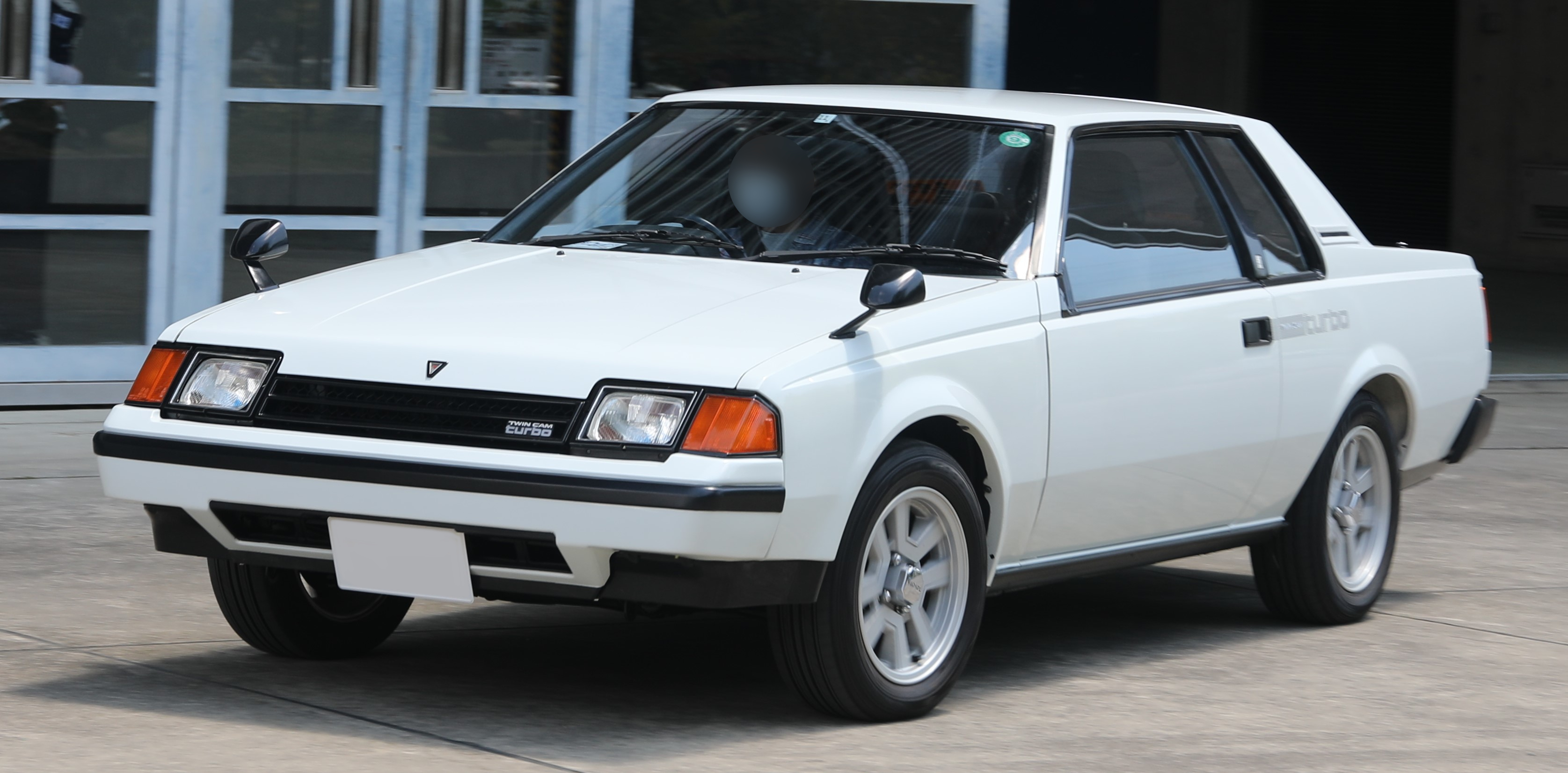
- Pre-facelift Toyota Celica Coupé GT-TS (TA64, Japan)

Overview
- Model code: A60
- Production: August 1981 – July 1985
- Assembly: Japan: Toyota City, Aichi (Tsutsumi plant); Tahara, Aichi (Tahara plant, 1981–1999)

Body and chassis
- Class: Sports car
- Body style: 3-door liftback coupé; 2-door notchback coupé; 2-door convertible
- Layout: Front-engine, rear-wheel-drive
- Related: Toyota Supra; Toyota Carina

Powertrain
- Engine: 1588 cc 2T-B/2T-G I4 (TA60/61); 1587 cc 4A-G I4 (AA63); 1770 cc 3T-E I4 (TA62); 1770 cc 3T-GTE I4 (TA63); 1791 cc 4T-GTEU I4 (TA64); 1832 cc 1S-U I4 (SA60); 1968 cc 18R-G I4 (RA63); 1972 cc 21R I4 (RA60/61); 1995 cc 2S-C I4 (SA63); 2366 cc 22R/22R-E I4 (RA64/65)
- Transmission: 4-speed A40D automatic; 5-speed W55, W58, T50 manual

Dimensions
- Wheelbase: 2,500 mm (98.4 in)
- Length: 4,435 mm (174.6 in)
- Width: 1,665 mm (65.6 in)
- Height: 1,310 mm (51.6 in)
- Curb weight: 970–1,227 kg (2,138–2,705 lb)

Toyota introduced the third-generation Celica in August 1981 with considerably revised styling, in notchback coupe and liftback body styles — followed by a convertible variant in 1984.

Engine choices varied by market and included the 1.6-liter 4A, 1.6-liter 2T, 1.8-liter 3T, 1.8-liter 4T, 1.8-liter 1S, 2.0-liter 2S, 2.0-liter 18R-G and 2.0-liter 21R. The Australian, European, Japanese, and general export model Celicas came with rear side vents, while the North American versions received red conspicuity lights on the rear quarter panels.

The Celica was facelifted in August 1983 for the 1984 model year. The revision included fully retractable headlights, restyled grille, and airdam. The rear combination lamps were also revised, and the notchback coupé got black center garnish that surrounded the rear license plate.

=== Japan ===
Initial trim levels for the Japanese market were SV, ST, ST-EFI, SX, GT, and GT Rally.

In September 1982, the Celica 1800 GT-T was launched exclusively for the Japanese market. It was the first-ever turbocharged Celica, although it's still rear-wheel drive.

In Japanese market after the facelift, the Celica was offered as below:

- SX/ST/SV with 1S-U(SA60)
- 1600 GT/GT-R with 4A-GE(AA63)
- 1800 GT-T/GT-TR with 3T-GTE(TA63)

=== North America ===
For the US and Canadian market, power for the Celica was provided by a 2.4 L 22R or 22R-E engine in all North American models that became the biggest 4-cylinder engine offered in any Celica ever. In 1982, the New York Yankees began using a Celica as their bullpen car. Fuel injection became standard on all North American Celicas started from August 1982, therefore the 22R engine became 22R-E (or 22R-EC with California emissions equipment)with power going up to 87 kW (117 hp) and 174 N⋅m (128 lb⋅ft). In August 1982, Toyota added the GT-S model to the North American market to re-inject the sports image that Celica had lost as it grew larger and heavier with each subsequent model. The GT-S included larger 14x7-inch wheels and 225/60HR14 tires, fender flares, independent rear suspension, a sports interior including special seats, and a leather-wrapped steering wheel and shifter knob. Most of these came from the Supra. From the windshield back, both cars were nearly identical when in Liftback form. There were also optional rear louvers for the coupe and Liftback. Rack and pinion steering was offered for this generation Celica.

The facelifted Celica was launched in late 1983 for the 1984 model year, in ST, GT, and GT-S trims.

The GT-S convertible was manufactured in conjunction with American Sunroof Company (ASC) in Long Beach, California at a dedicated $5M plant built by ASC. The bodies were manufactured nearly to completion in Japan, including all structural bracing as well as the integration of reinforcement plates, gussets, and strips — and forwarded to Long Beach with a package of further items to be altered and integrated — with careful scrutiny by onsite Japanese engineers and inspectors — and specific attention to assembly procedures, corrosion protection and leak tests. ASC removed the notchback's roof, integrated further bracing and hardware and constructed the convertible top itself, which was fully powered with headliner, zippered and heated glass rear window and a three-part rigid plastic tonneau cover, retaining a trunk pass-through for long objects. Trunk space was reduced from 10.6 to 9.9 cu ft (300 to 280 L). The design intent was to retain 95 percent of the notchback body's structural rigidity. The convertible was originally released in a run of 200 in 1983 for model year 1984, followed by 4,248 in 1984 for model year 1985.

=== Europe ===
For the European continent, the Celica was provided as below:

- 1600 ST with 2T engine and live rear axle (TA60)
- 2000 XT with 21R engine and independent rear suspension (RA61)
- 2000 GT with 18R-G engine (RA63)

In the UK, the 60-series Celica was offered as below:

- 2.0 ST (early) and 2.0 XT (facelift) with 21R engine(RA60/61).

All the facelifted European Celica got the same new front treatment as the other destination models. The Liftback also received new rear combination lamps, but the notchback coupé retained the old styles. The 18R-G powered 2000 GT was replaced by the new 4A-GE powered 1600 GT. In Germany, the facelifted Celica was offered as 1600 ST Coupé, 1600 ST Liftback, 2000 XT Liftback, and 1600 GT Coupé.

=== Australia ===
In Australia, Celica was initially provided as below:

- 2.0 21R-C that the car only produced 67 kW (90 hp) as a result.

For the 1983 facelifted model, the 2.0 21-RC was replaced by the more powerful engine as below:

- 73 kW (98 hp) 2S-C motor with independent rear suspension rather than the traditional live axle differential. This SA63 version was only sold in 1983 and 1984 and only in Australia. In late 1984, the SA63 was replaced by the RA65 which also has independent rear suspension and new fuel-injected 2.4-liter 22R-E engine which provided 87 kW (118 PS; 117 hp).
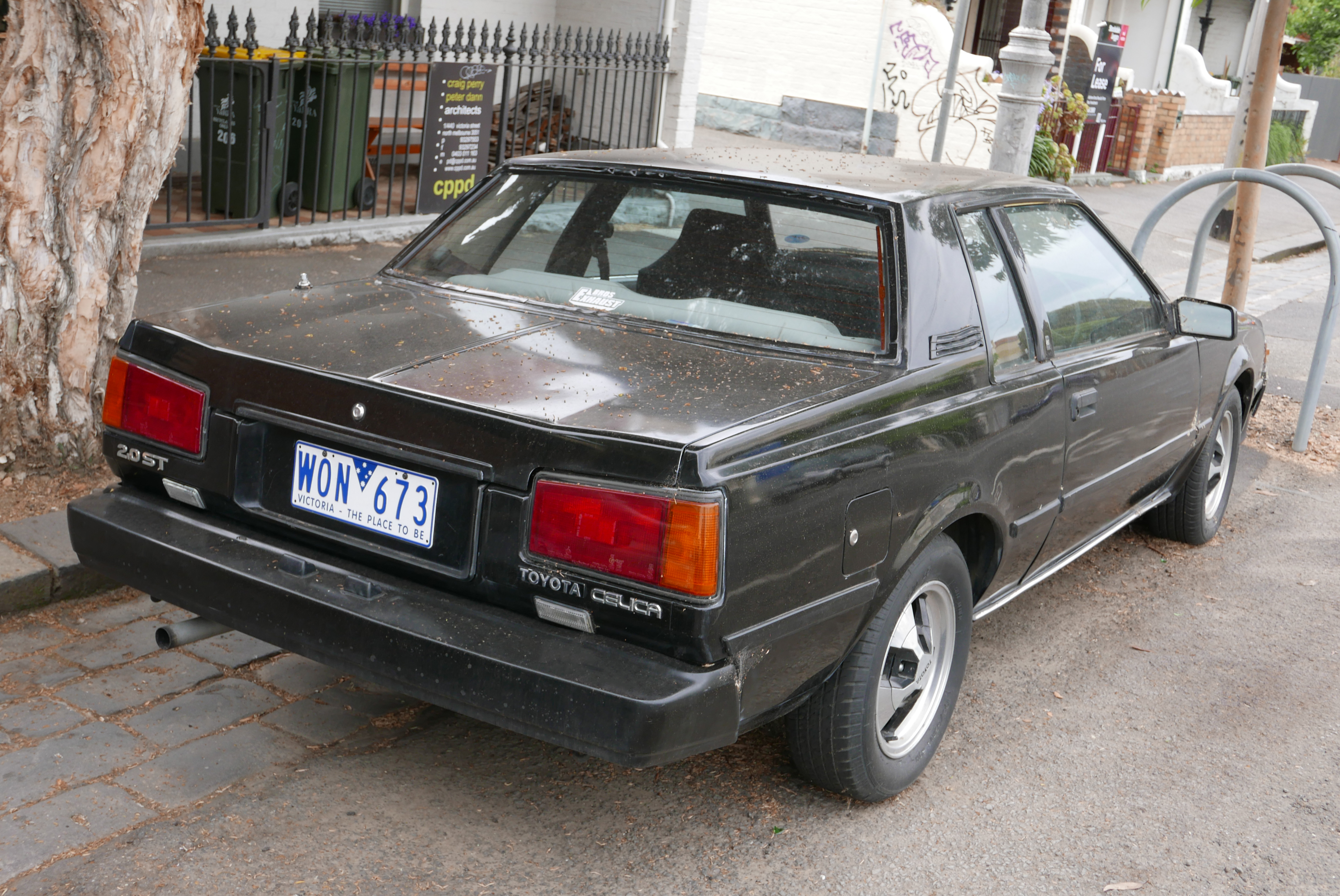
Pre-facelift Toyota Celica ST notchback coupe (SA63, Australia)

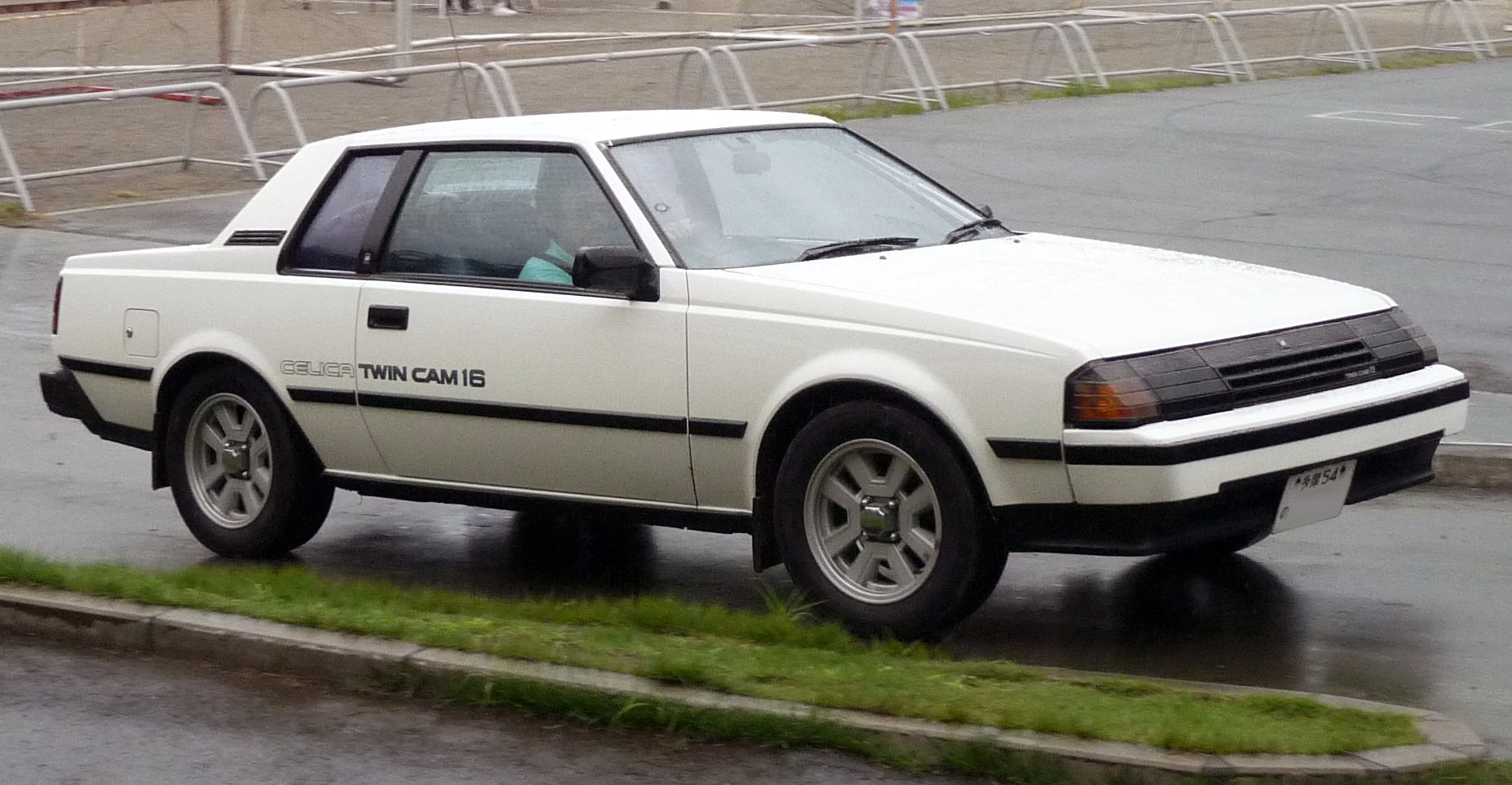
The facelift model Toyota Celica 1600 GT-R Coupe (AA63, Japan)

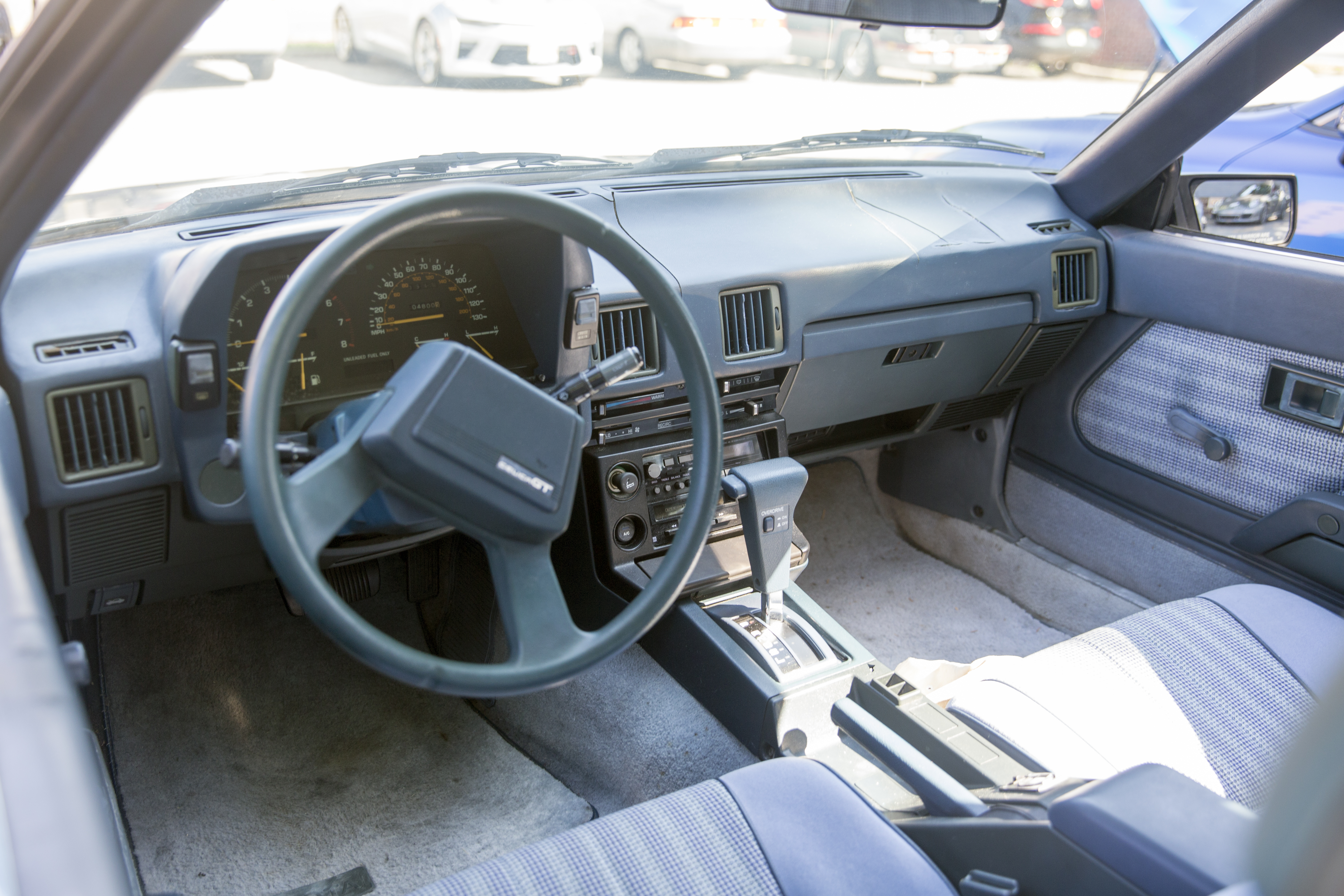
1984 Toyota Celica GT Coupe interior

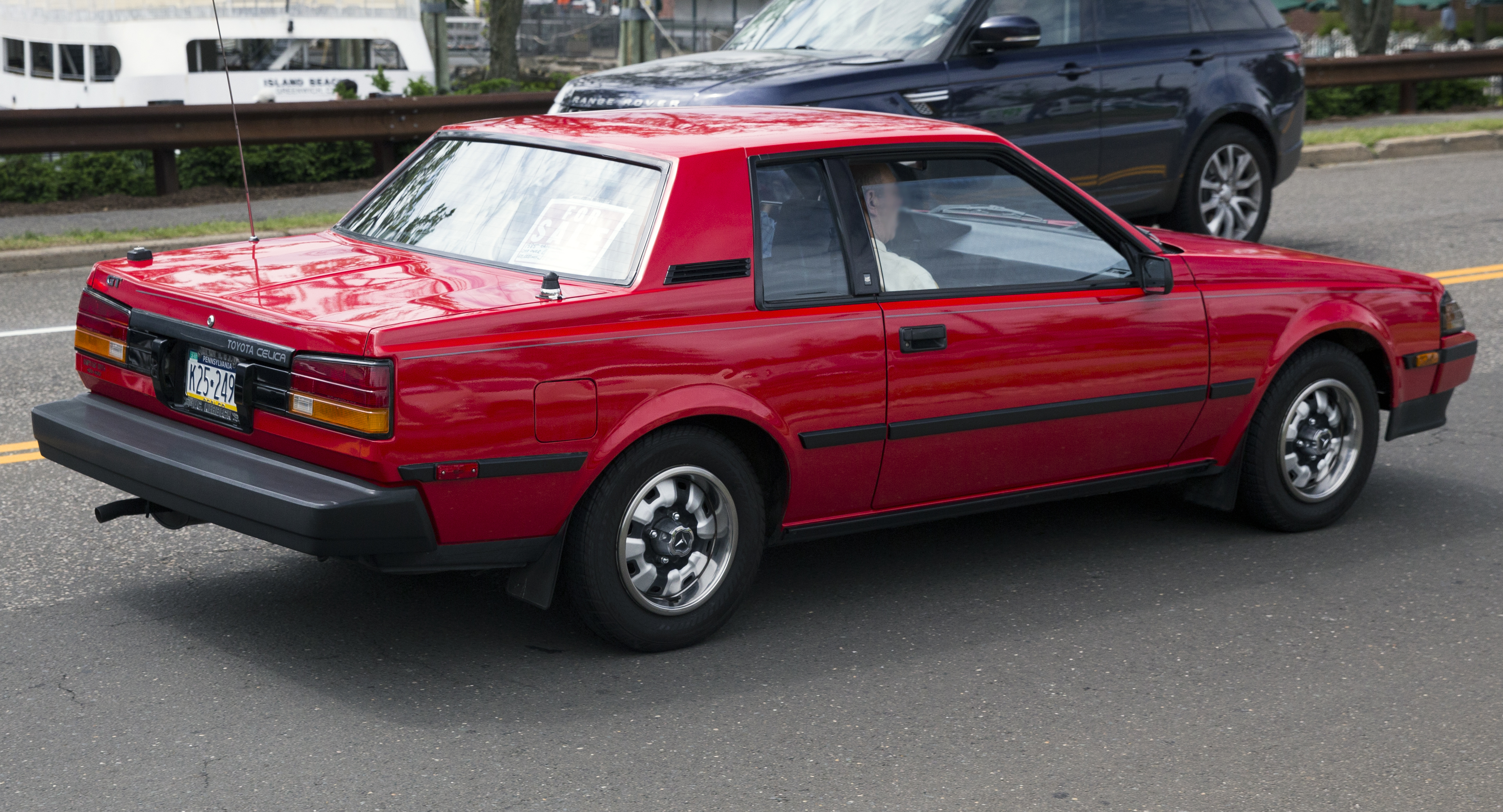
The facelift model Toyota Celica GT Coupe (RA64, US)

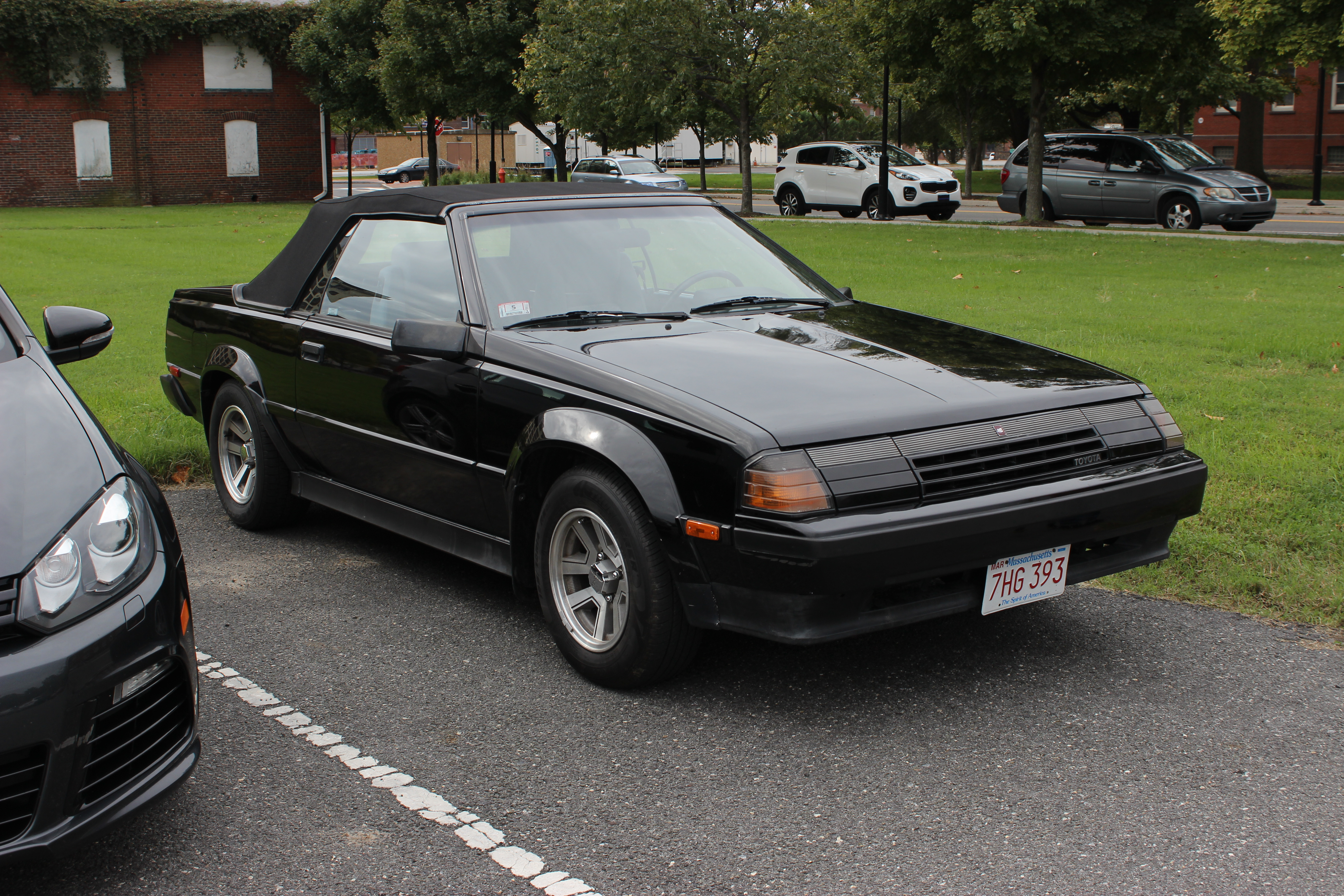
1985 Toyota Celica GT-S Convertible (RA65, US)

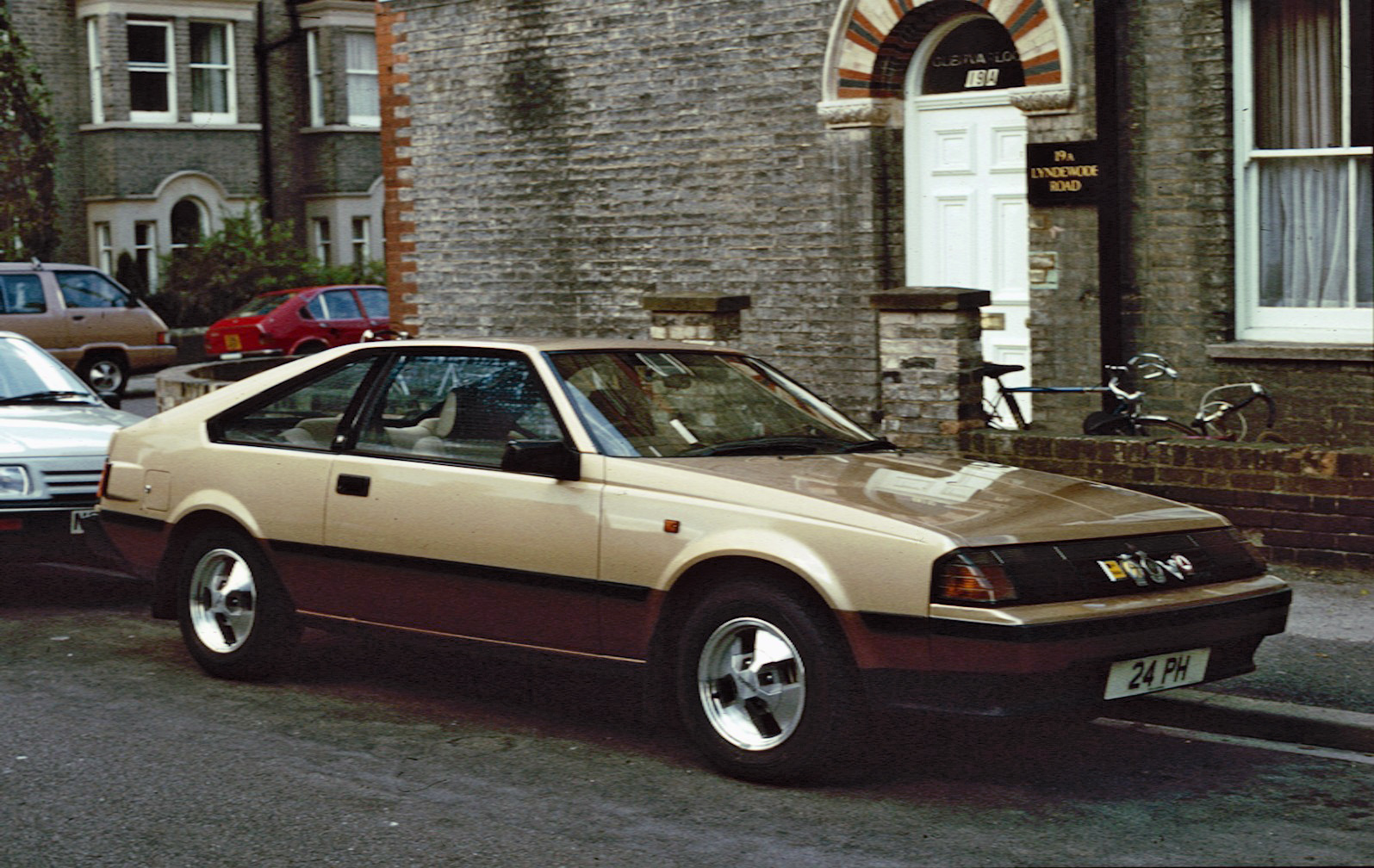
The facelift model Toyota Celica 2.0 XT Liftback (RA61, UK)

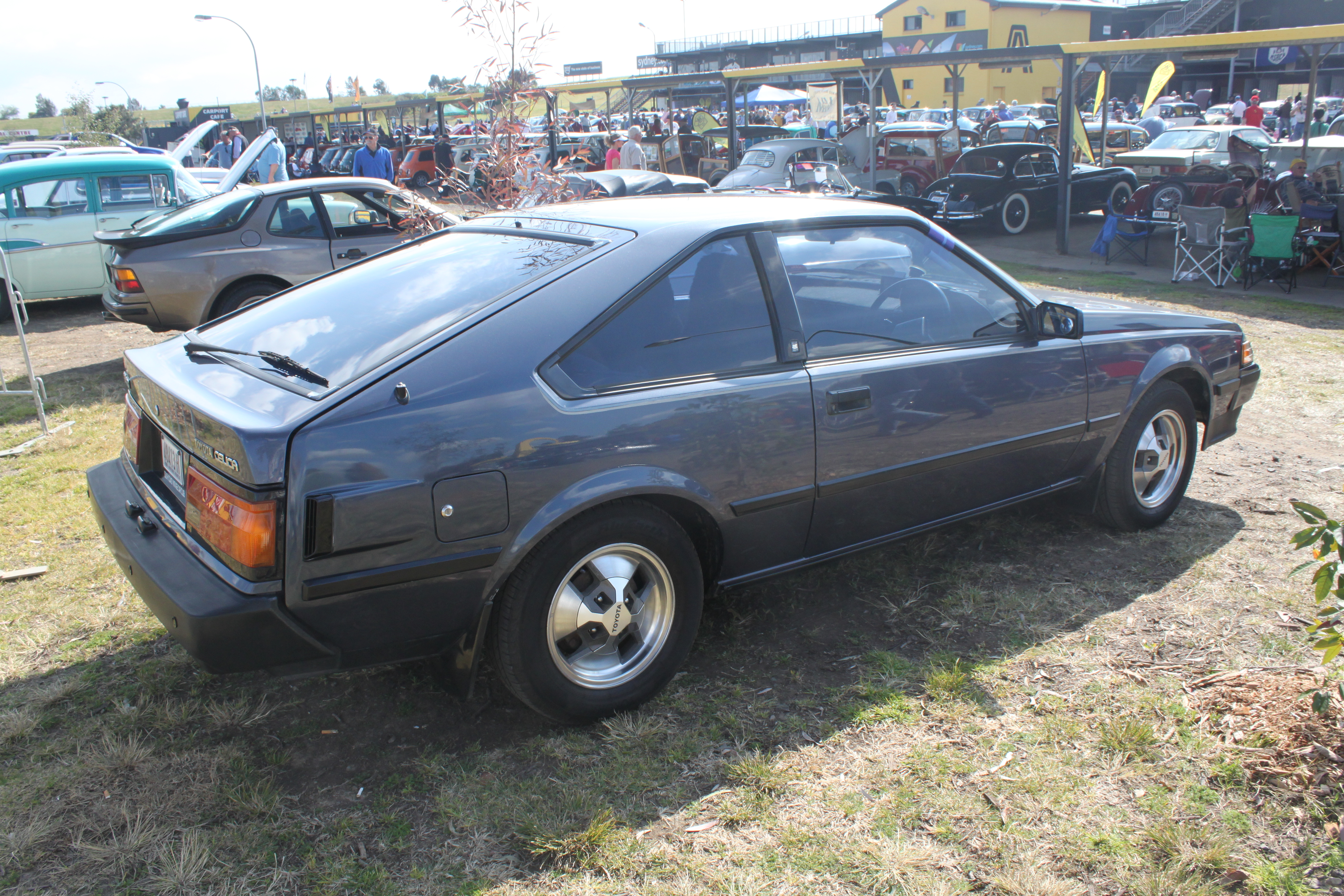
1985 Toyota Celica 2400 XT Liftback (RA65, Australia)

=== Twincam Turbo Group B Rally Car ===
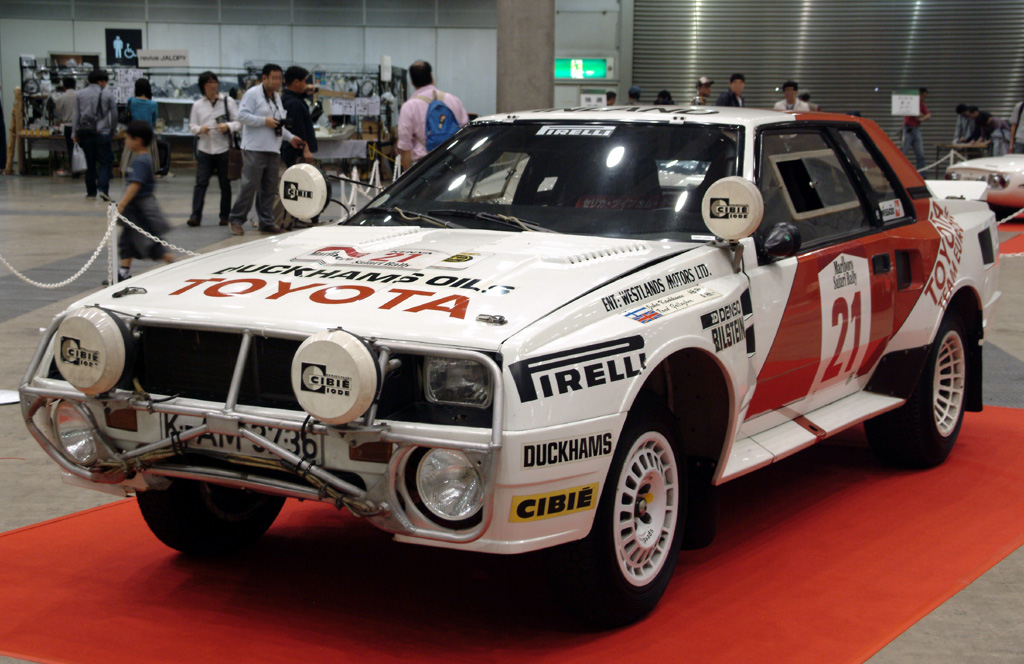
Juha Kankkunen's 1985 Toyota Celica TwinCam Turbo (TA64) Group B rally car

To meet the FISA regulation for Group B Rally Car to compete in the World Rally Championship (WRC), 200 units of the Celica GT-TS were built. These were the basic cars for Group B Celica Twincam Turbo (TA64) which were built and rallied by Toyota Team Europe (TTE). The Group B Celica TCT made its WRC debut in the 1983 Rally Finland. The production car had a 180 PS (132 kW; 178 hp) engine, and with a 320 bhp (239 kW; 324 PS) 4T-GTE engine, the fully works rally car was the most powerful third-generation Celica.

Before the turbo model, the naturally aspirated, twin-cam 16-valve Celica 2000 GT (RA63) was also campaigned; winning the 1982 Rally New Zealand on its first serious outing.

==== WRC victories ====
No.	Event	Season	Driver	Co-driver	Car
1	Rally New Zealand	1982	(Sweden) Björn Waldegård	(Sweden) Hans Thorszelius	Toyota Celica 2000GT
2	(Ivory Coast) 15ème Rallye Côte d'Ivoire	1983	(Sweden) Björn Waldegård	(Sweden) Hans Thorszelius	Toyota Celica Twincam Turbo
3	(Kenya) 32nd Marlboro Safari Rally	1984	(Sweden) Björn Waldegård	(Sweden) Hans Thorszelius	Toyota Celica Twincam Turbo
4	(Kenya) 33rd Marlboro Safari Rally	1985	(Finland) Juha Kankkunen	(United Kingdom) Fred Gallagher	Toyota Celica Twincam Turbo
5	(Ivory Coast) 17ème Rallye Côte d'Ivoire	1985	(Finland) Juha Kankkunen	(United Kingdom) Fred Gallagher	Toyota Celica Twincam Turbo
6	(Kenya) 34th Marlboro Safari Rally	1986	(Sweden) Björn Waldegård	(United Kingdom) Fred Gallagher	Toyota Celica Twincam Turbo
7	(Ivory Coast) 18ème Rallye Côte d'Ivoire	1986	(Sweden) Björn Waldegård	(United Kingdom) Fred Gallagher	Toyota Celica Twincam Turbo

== Fourth generation (T160; 1985) ==
Fourth generation
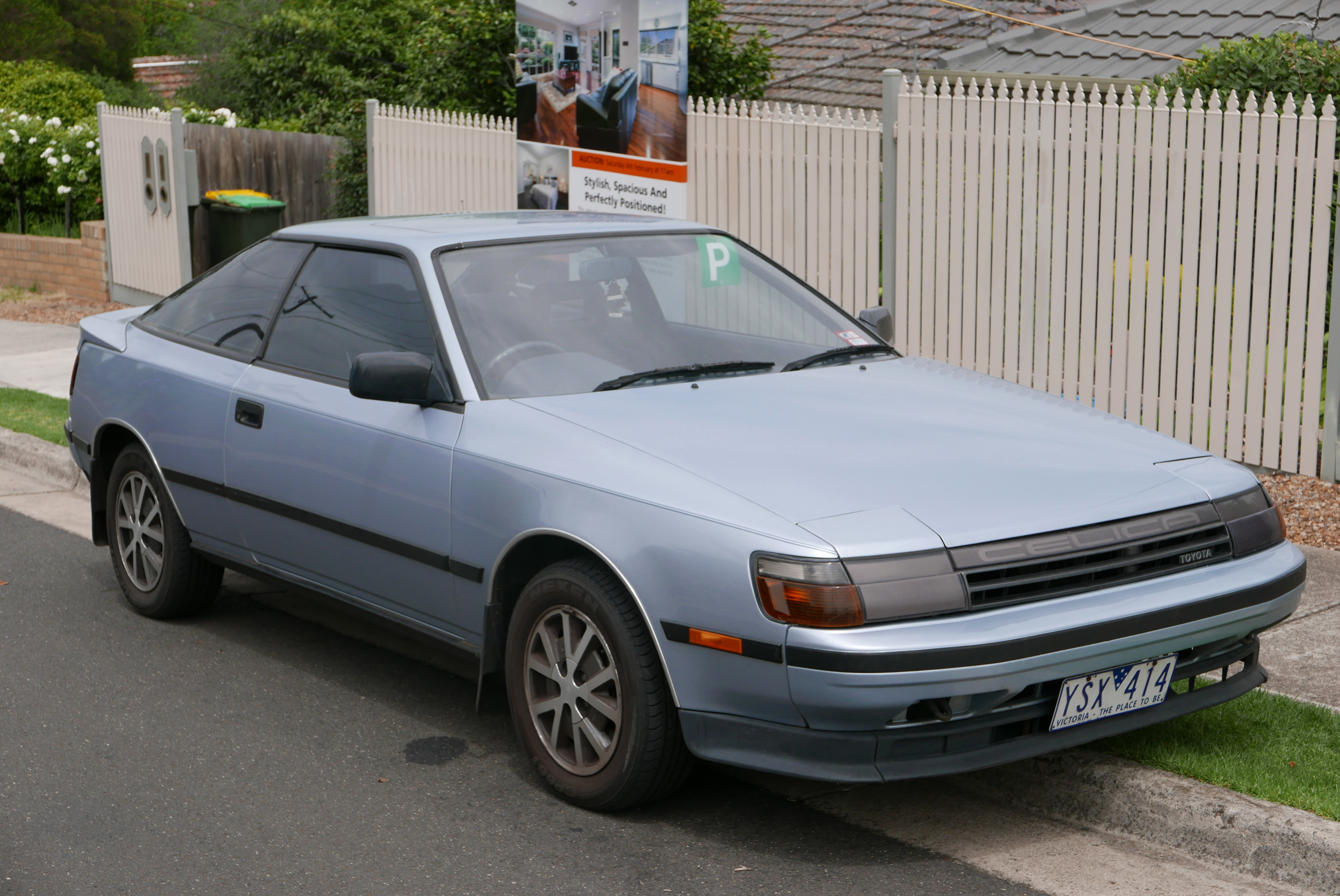
- Pre-facelift Toyota Celica 2.0 SX Liftback (ST162, Australia)

Overview
- Model code: T160
- Also called: Toyota Corona (T160) coupe
- Production: August 1985 – August 1989
- Assembly: Japan: Tahara, Aichi (Tahara plant)

Body and chassis
- Class: Sports car
- Body style: 3-door liftback coupé; 2-door notchback coupé; 2-door convertible
- Layout: Front-engine, front-wheel-drive; Front-engine, four-wheel-drive (GT-Four)
- Related: Toyota Carina; Toyota Carina ED

Powertrain
- Engine: 1.6 L 4A-GE DOHC I4; 1.8 L 1S-iLU I4; 1.8 L 4S-Fi I4; 2.0 L 2S-ELC I4; 2.0 L 3S-FE I4; 2.0 L 3S-GE DOHC I4; 2.0 L 3S-GTE turbo I4
- Transmission: 4-speed automatic; 5-speed manual

Dimensions
- Wheelbase: 2,525 mm (99.4 in)
- Length: 4,410 mm (173.6 in) (coupe/convertible); 4,365 mm (171.9 in) (liftback)
- Width: 1,710 mm (67.3 in); 1,690 mm (66.7 in) (Japan)
- Height: 1,260 mm (49.8 in)

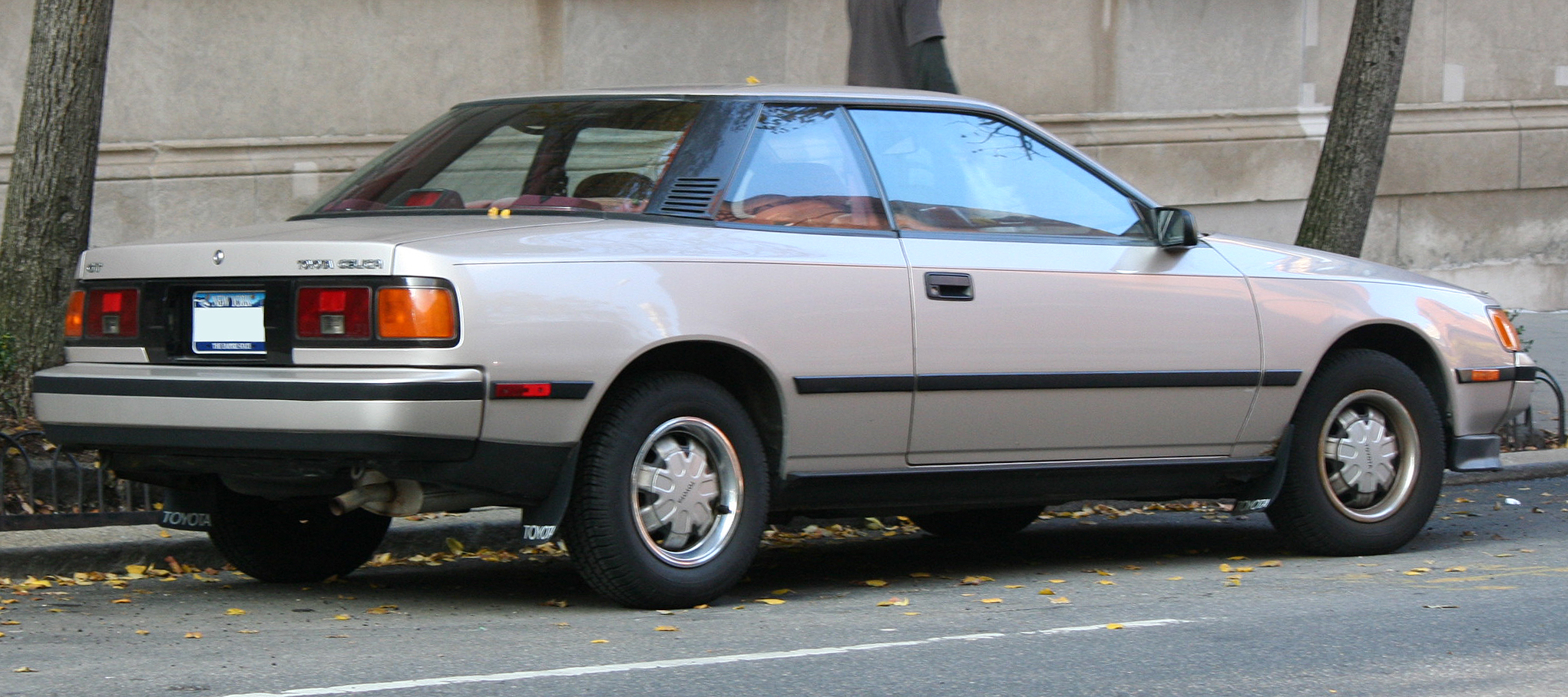
1986 Toyota Celica GT coupé (ST161, US)

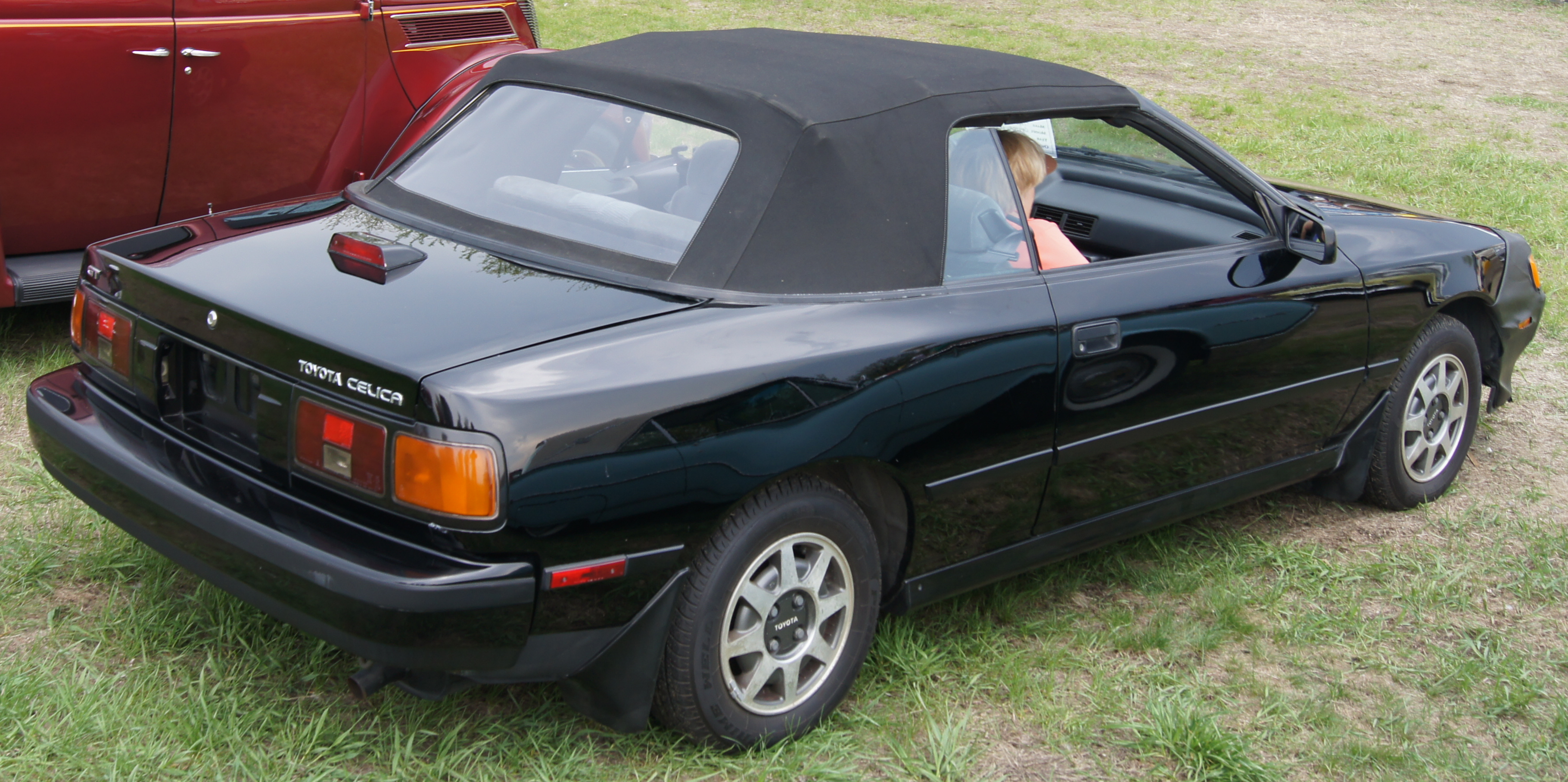
1987 Toyota Celica GT Convertible (ST162, US)

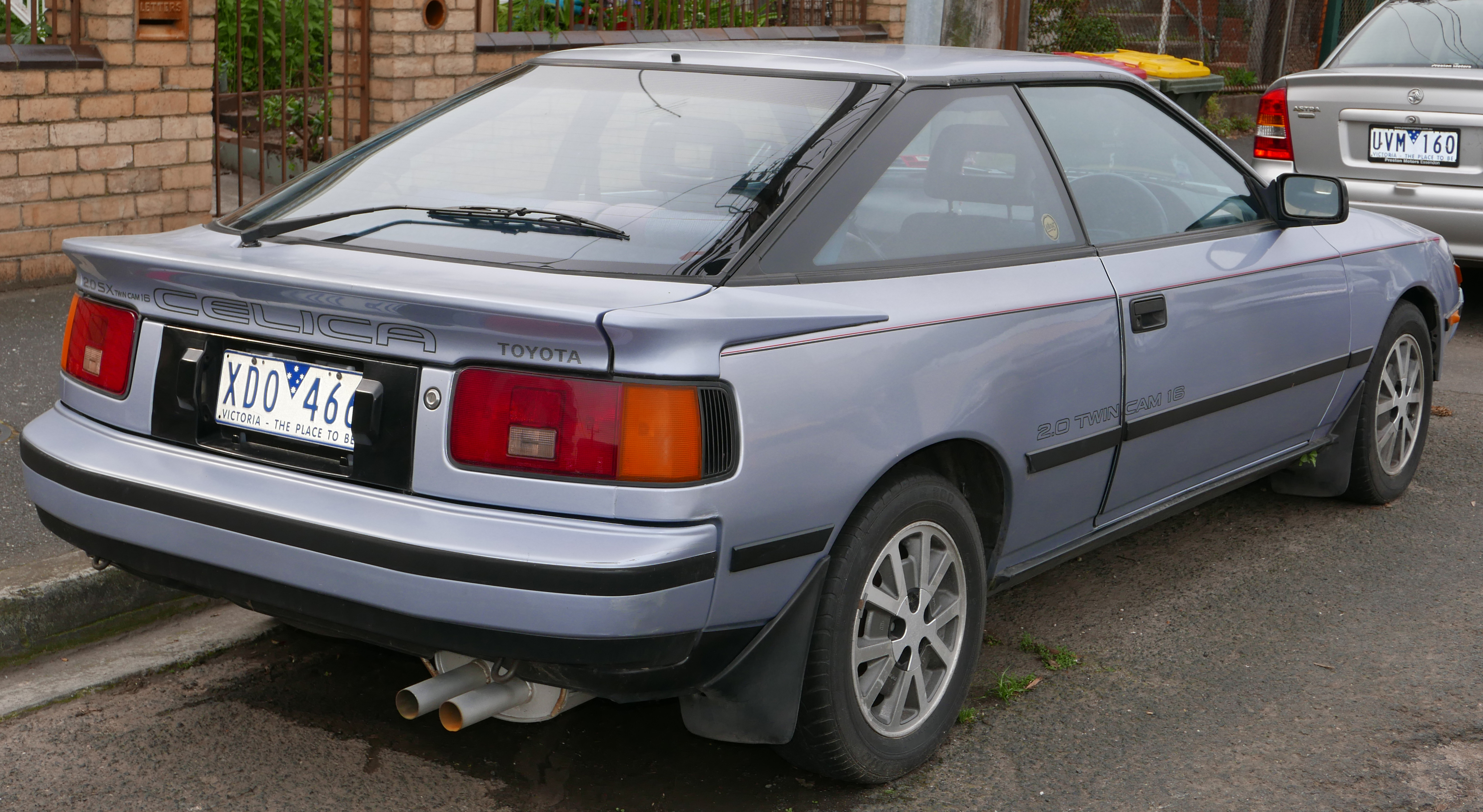
Pre-facelift Toyota Celica 2.0 SX Liftback (ST162, Australia)

In August 1985 the Celica was changed completely. It was an all-new vehicle with front wheel drive, a rounded, flowing body and new 2.0 L four-cylinder engines. The Celica was no longer built on the Toyota A platform, and instead realigned with the Toyota T platform underpinning the Toyota Corona. The Toyota A platform was now exclusive to the Toyota Supra. The coupe bodystyle in Japan was used only for the Corona coupe, sold only at Japanese Toyota dealerships Toyopet Store without the retractable headlights. An optional feature only offered on the Corona coupe was four-wheel steering, not shared with the Celica during this generation, however, the turbocharged engine on the Celica was not installed in the Corona coupe.

Toyota introduced the "ultimate Celica", the GT-Four (ST165) onto the Japanese market in October 1986. With full-time all-wheel drive, including an electronically controlled central locking differential, and a turbocharged version of the GT-S 2.0 L engine producing 185 PS (136 kW) (3S-GTE), it immediately took its place as the flagship of the Celica range and became the official Toyota rally car for all years of production. The GT-Four, with a revised viscous coupling central locking differential, began export in 1987 (1988 US model year) and marketed in North America as the All-trac Turbo. It was rated at 190 bhp (142 kW; 193 PS) and 190 lb⋅ft (258 N⋅m). The All-trac system was also offered for a limited time on the Camry, and Corolla in North America without the turbo, as well as the normally aspirated and supercharged Previa.

The ST165 chassis design was quite acclaimed in its time. Toyota chose not to make any drastic suspension changes for the AWD GT-Four. The front suspension comprises MacPherson struts with an anti-swaybar and strut tower brace, while the rear employs struts with a trailing link and twin lateral links per side plus an anti-swaybar.

The ST165 GT-Four made its World Rally debut in the 1988 Tour de Corse and finished 6th. The first victory came in 1988 Cyprus (non-WRC), and the first WRC victory in 1989 Rally Australia.

As with the previous generation, the convertibles were converted by ASC. Coupes were shipped from Japan to their facility in Rancho Dominguez, California, where the top was chopped and a power convertible top, reinforcements to the chassis, rear quarter windows, and a one-piece fold-down seat were installed. ASC also handled the process for the Japanese market. Partially built, right-hand-drive Celicas were shipped from Japan to California, ASC performed the conversion, and the completed cars made a second trip across the Pacific back to Japan. The Celica convertible was in high demand in Japan because of the exotic appeal of the American modifications.

Summary of 4th Generation Models
Chassis Code	Body Style	Engine	Trim Level	Market
AT160	Coupe, Liftback	4A-F, 4A-GE	1.6 ST (4A-F), 1.6 GT (4A-GE)	Japan, General
ST160	Liftback	1S-iLU	1.8 ST, 1.8 SX	Japan
ST161	Coupe, Liftback	2S-ELC	2.0 ST, 2.0 GT (1986 model year only)	North America
ST162	Coupe, Liftback, convertible	3S-FE, 3S-GE	2.0 ST & 2.0 GT (3S-FE), 2.0 GT-R (3S-GELU), 2.0 GT-i 16, 2.0 SX & 2.0 GT-S (3S-GE), 2.0 ZR (3S-FE)	Japan (liftback and convertible), North America (all body styles), Europe (liftback and convertible), Australia & New Zealand (liftback and coupe)
ST163	Liftback	4S-Fi	1.8 ST, 1.8 SX	Japan (introduced May 1988)
ST165	Liftback	3S-GTE	GT-Four, Turbo All-Trac	Japan, Europe, North America

=== Japan ===
For the Japanese market, the fourth-generation Celica started with the 1.8-liter 1S-iSU engine in the ST160 and 1.6-liter 4A-GE engine in the AT160. The 4A engine in the 1.6 GT was terminated in August 1987 and the 1S-iLU engine was replaced by the 4S-Fi engine in the ST163 in May 1988. Models with the 3S-GELU sports twincam came in GT and GT-R trim levels. The 3S-GTE turbo engine was also introduced in October 1986 for the all-wheel drive ST165 GT-Four. The factory Convertible (coded ST162C) was offered with the twincam 3S-FE engine. The vehicle with the 2.0 liter engine was regarded as the top trim level package due to the increased annual road tax so the GT was fully equipped to justify the tax liability.

Non twincam models came in ST and SX trim levels with the 1S-iLU engine. Models with the 3S-FE economy twincam came in the ZR trim level, including the Convertible. A digital instrument panel was offered on the higher grade GT and GT-R trims. The notchback two-door coupe bodystyle was not offered as a Celica in Japan; instead this body was sold as the Toyota Corona coupe, with fixed headlights rather than the Celica's pop-up units.

=== Australia ===
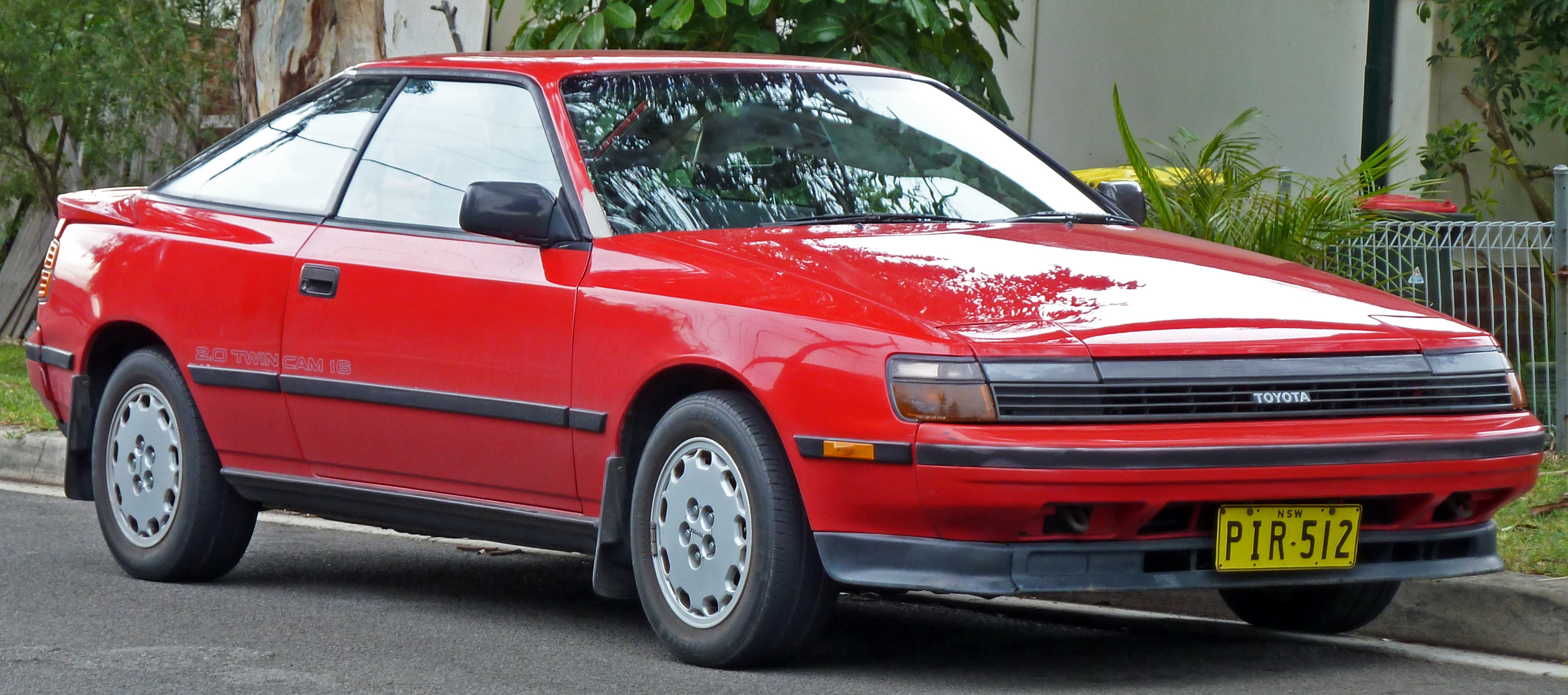
Facelift Toyota Celica 2.0 SX Liftback (ST162, Australia)

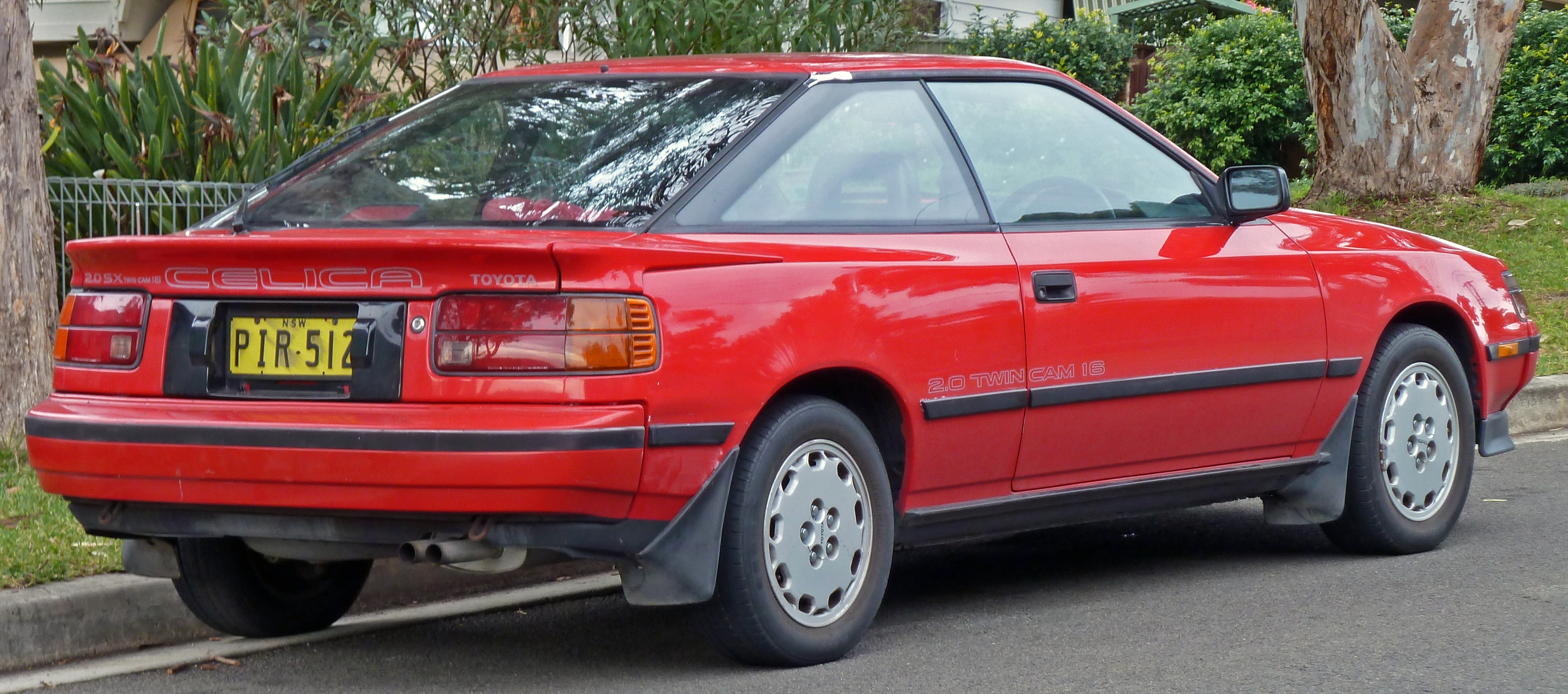
Facelift Toyota Celica 2.0 SX Liftback (ST162, Australia)

The Australian spec Celica ST162 were the base model ST with 3S-FE engine offered as notchback coupe and liftback, and the top-of-the-line SX Liftback with higher performance 3S-GE Twincam engine. Rear spoiler and alloy wheels came standard on the SX, which made it the same appearance as the Japanese GT-R or American GT-S.

The limited edition SX White Lightning with all white bumpers, side protectors and wheels was offered in 1989. Inside, it featured cruise control (automatic models only) and the same sports seats used in the ST165 GT-Four, but was otherwise identical to the SX.

=== Europe ===
In most European countries these models were available instead:

Chassis code	Model	Engine	Power		at rpm	Nm	at rpm	kg	0–100 km/h (0-62 mph)	Top Speed	
Chassis code	Model	Engine	kW	PS	at rpm	Nm	at rpm	kg	0–100 km/h (0-62 mph)	km/h	mph
AT160	1.6 ST	1587 cc 8V 4A-C (Carb)	64	87	5600	136	3600	1005	12.4 s	175	109
AT160	1.6 GT	1587 cc 16V 4A-GE	92	125	6600	142	5000	1060	8.9 s	205	127
ST162	2.0 GT	1998 cc 16V 3S-FE	92	125	5600	169	4400	1060	8.9 s	205	127
ST162	2.0 GT-S	1998 cc 16V 3S-GE	112	152	6400	180	4800	1130	8.6 s	210	130
ST165	2.0 GT-Four	1998 cc 16V 3S-GTE Turbo	142	193	6000	249	3200	1465	7.9 s	220	137

The convertible (better known as cabriolet) was based on the 2.0 GT. The GT-S was badged 2.0 GT-i 16. The GT-Four came with turbo 4WD decal on the rear spoiler and Toyota 4WD emblem on the grille.

=== North America ===
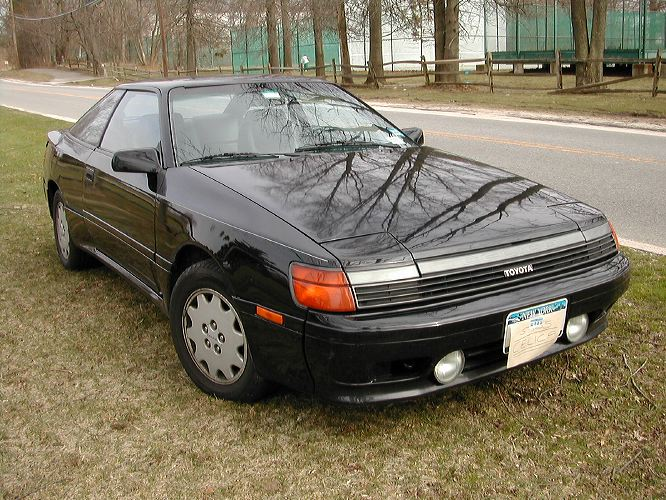
1988 Toyota Celica All-Trac Turbo (ST165, US)

Trims available were the ST coupe or the GT and GT-S that came as a coupe or Liftback; with the GT trim available as a soft-top convertible starting in the 1987 model year. The GT-Four which marketed as Turbo All-Trac was available for the 1988 model year. All trims came standard with a tachometer, oil pressure, voltmeter (replaced with a boost meter in the ST165) gauges and a rear window defogger for the interior.

ST: The ST was the most basic form of the T160 chassis. In 1986, for the 1987 model year, the chassis was designated as the ST161. It had the SOHC 8-valve, 2.0 L 2S-E 4-cylinder engine from the Camry, producing 97 hp (72 kW) at 4,400 rpm and 118 ft-lbs. of torque at 4,000 rpm. However, this only lasted a year as it was changed over to an all new DOHC engine 3S-FE for the 1987 model year producing 115 hp (86 kW) at 5,200 rpm and 124 ft-lbs. of torque at 4,400 rpm; and as a result, the chassis designation was changed to ST162. The ST was the lightest T160 chassis at 2,455 lbs. with the manual transmission. A 5-speed manual was the only transmission available in 1986, with a 4-speed automatic being optional 1987 onwards, bringing the curb weight to 2,522 lbs. Steel wheels were wrapped with 165/80-13 tires. The interior had manual windows and locks, bucket seats and an AM/FM receiver as standard features. Power steering and power brakes were standard, with ventilated discs in the front and drum brakes in the rear. Cable operated air conditioning was optional.

GT: The GT shared the ST's engine as well as the chassis designation being the ST161 with a 2S-E engine in 1986 quickly changing over to the ST162 with a 3S-FE engine 1987 onwards. The curb weight was 2,515 lbs for the coupe and 2546 lbs. for the Liftback. A 4-speed overdrive automatic transmission (A140L) was an option, bringing the curb weight up to 2,579 and 2,610 lbs., respectively. The convertible weighed in at 2,700 lbs. for the manual and 2760 lbs. for the automatic. For the interior, the GT came with an electronic 4-speaker AM/FM/MPX tuner, power side mirrors, tilt steering wheel, driver's lumbar support and an automatic retracting radio antenna was standard. Power locks, windows, power tilt/slide sunroof, side mirror defogger, cruise control, electronic air conditioning, and 13x5.5-inch aluminum alloy wheels were optional with 185/70-13 tires. A digital instrument panel was available as an option for the non-convertible GT trim only. The GT also includes a front strut bar across the two strut towers as an upgrade over the ST trim, but retains the front ventilated disc and rear drum brake combination from the ST.

GT-S: The GT-S (chassis code ST162) was given a de-tuned version of the DOHC 2.0 L engine (3S-GELC) featuring T-VIS and a 6,800 rpm redline producing 135 hp (101 kW) at 6,000 rpm and 125 ft-lbs of torque at 4,800 rpm. An EGR and O2 sensor restricted the engine along with a milder ECU. The GT-S replaced the rear drum brakes with disc brakes going along with a 5x100 bolt pattern. Standard features in addition to the GT trim included an 8-way adjustable sports bucket seats with power lumbar and side bolsters, automatic climate control, side mirror defogger, wrap-around spoiler, telescopic steering wheel, and speed-rated 205/60-14 tires on 14x6-inch alloy wheels. Leather interior including shift knob, door panel inserts, and steering wheel were optional. In Canada, all GT-S models were 5-speed (S53) manual transmissions, but in the US, an electronic-controlled 4-speed automatic (A140E) with lock-up torque converter was available. New features in 1988–1989 included an illuminated vanity light as standard and ABS as optional.

Turbo All-Trac: The Turbo All-Trac (chassis code ST165), or turbo 4wd as it was named in Canada, is the North American version of the GT-Four. It was given a DOHC turbocharged, water-to-air intercooled 2.0-liter 4-cylinder engine (3S-GTE) featuring T-VIS producing 190 hp (142 kW) at 6,000 rpm and 190 ft-lbs of torque at 3,200 rpm. The All-Trac only came with a 5-speed all-wheel-drive transmission with a viscous-coupling center differential, bringing the curb weight to 3,197 lbs. The ST165 was not sold in North America before 1988 except for seventy-seven special-edition cars sold in 1987 as 1988 models at each of the 77 Toyota dealerships in California to commemorate Toyota's IMSA GTO championship win. These Celicas are all white with white wheels and blue interior and have "IMSA GTO CHAMPION" printed in small letters on the side moulding, as well as a white stripe on the grille. This top-of-the-line trim came with the same options as the GT-S with the exception of the power interior options, leather steering wheel, fog lights, V-rated tires, and a factory full body kit as standard. One interior feature that is missing from the GT-S trim and other trims is the cup holder as the center console is different due to a larger center body tunnel to accommodate for the ST165's center drive shaft.

== Fifth generation (T180; 1989) ==
Fifth generation
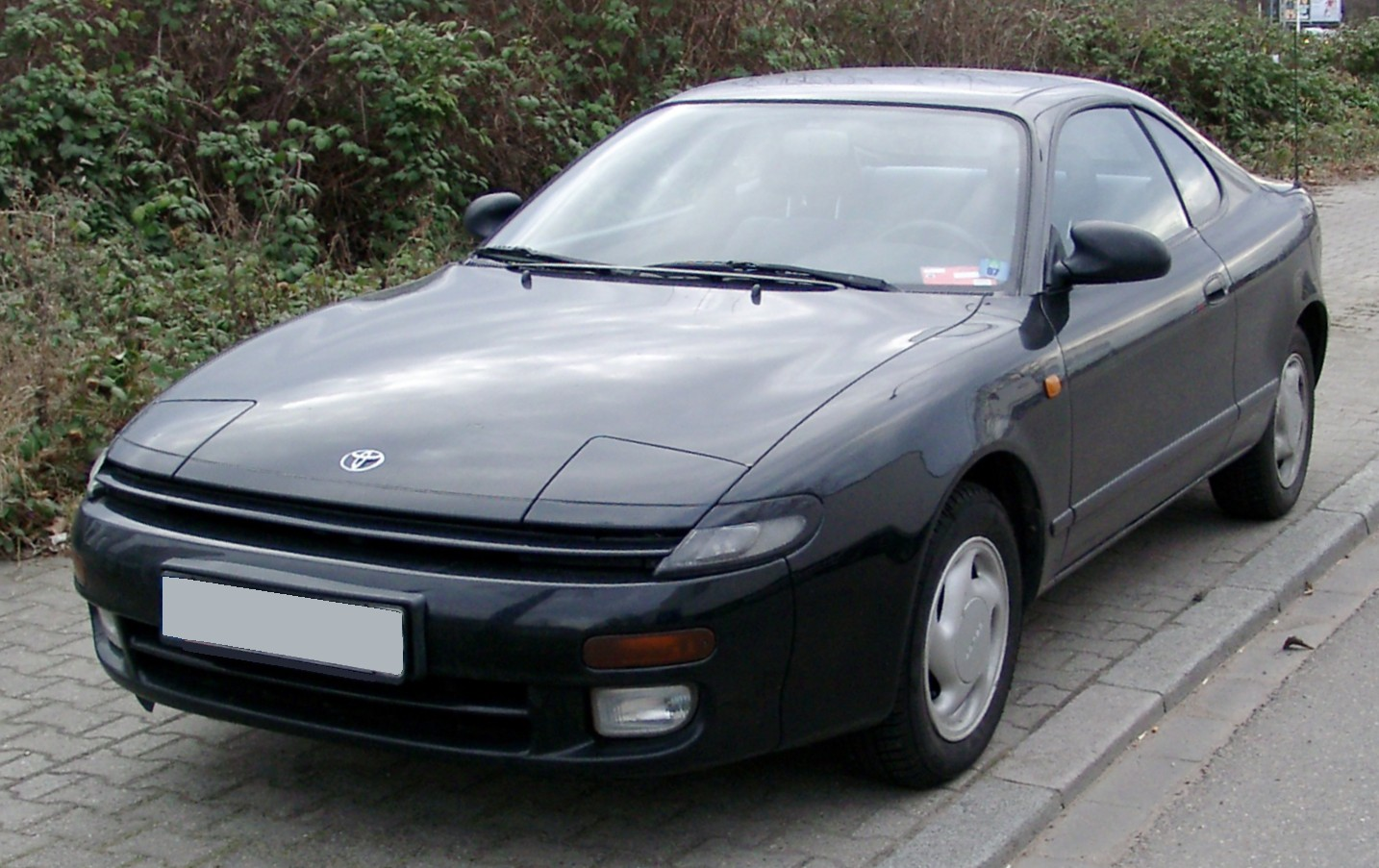
- Facelift Toyota Celica 1.6 ST-i Liftback (AT180, Europe)

Overview
- Model code: T180
- Production: September 1989 – September 1993
- Assembly: Japan: Tahara, Aichi (Tahara plant)

Body and chassis
- Class: Sports car
- Body style: 2-door notchback coupé; 2-door convertible; 3-door liftback (normal-body); 3-door liftback (wide-body)
- Layout: Front-engine, front-wheel-drive; Front-engine, four-wheel-drive (GT-Four)
- Related: Toyota Carina ED; Toyota Corona EXIV

Powertrain
- Engine: 1.6 L 4A-FE I4; 2.0 L 3S-FE I4; 2.0 L 3S-GE I4; 2.0 L turbo 3S-GTE I4; 2.2 L 5S-FE I4
- Transmission: 4-speed automatic; 5-speed manual

Dimensions
- Wheelbase: 2,525 mm (99.4 in)
- Length: Coupe/convertible: 4,470 mm (176.0 in); Narrow body Liftback: 4,410 mm (173.6 in); Wide body Liftback: 4,420 mm (174.0 in)
- Width: 1990 ST Coupe: 1,690 mm (66.5 in); Convertible, 1991–93 coupe, normal body liftback: 1,705 mm (67.1 in); Wide body Liftback: 1,745 mm (68.7 in)
- Height: Liftback FF: 1,280 mm (50.4 in); Coupe, Liftback 4WD: 1,285 mm (50.6 in); Convertible: 1,300 mm (51.2 in)

The fifth-generation Celica was introduced in September 1989 for the 1990 model year. The Celica received new Super Round organic styling, upgraded wheels and tires, more powerful GT-Four (All-Trac Turbo in the US) with better cooling system, and for the Japanese market only, the four-wheel steering (4WS) models. Toyota engineers claimed that the round styling and lack of straight edges increased strength without adding weight. The Japanese market models were now S-R, Z-R, GT-R, Active Sports (first Toyota with Toyota Active Control Suspension), and GT-Four. The S-R and Z-R were powered by a 3S-FE engine, while the GT-R and Active Sports came with a 3S-GE. The 3S-GTE in the GT-Four features an air-to-air intercooler and CT26 twin entry turbo to eliminate exhaust gas interference. The Japanese market GT-Four has 165 kW (221 hp) and 304 N⋅m (224 lb⋅ft) of torque, a result of more aggressive ignition advance and ceramic turbine. The Full-time 4WD system in the GT-Four has viscous coupling limited-slip center differential and Torsen rear differential.

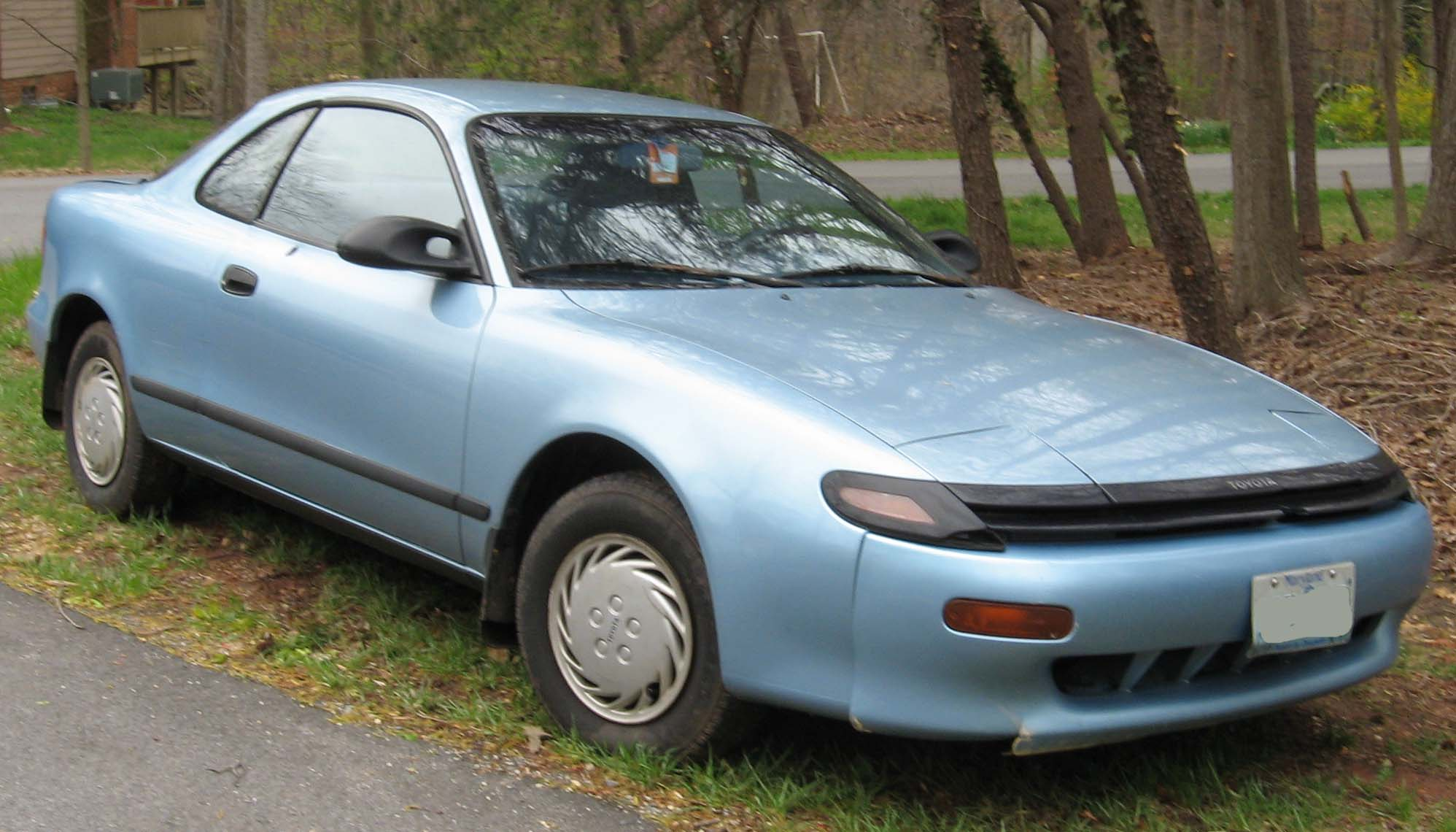
Pre-facelift Toyota Celica 1.6 ST notchback coupé (AT180, US)

The North American Celica had fixed door mirrors and amber front corner lights. All other destination models had folding mirrors and front clear corner lights. Driver's side SRS Airbag is standard on all US models. The base model ST has 1.6-liter 4A-FE, the GT and GT-S were powered by the 2.2-liter 5S-FE. The 1.6-liter was similar to the one used in the Corolla. The GT-S was rated 5 hp (4 kW) more than the GT at 135 bhp (101 kW; 137 PS). The 2.2-liter was designed for more low-end torque, which appealed to US buyers' preferences as opposed to the high-revving engines of the past. This engine was similar to the Camry's engine except for the balance shafts. The All-Trac Turbo was available with the improved 2.0-liter 3S-GTE engine. It was rated at 200 bhp (149 kW; 203 PS) and 200 lb⋅ft (271 N⋅m) torque. The GT-S and all export market GT-Four/All-Trac Turbo are wide-body liftbacks with flared fenders. The Japanese market GT-Four was also offered as normal-body for the pre-facelift model.

Trim levels for the European Celica were 1.6 ST-i, 2.0 GT-i 16, and GT-Four. The 2.0 GT-i 16 Cabriolet was offered only in certain European countries. Only the 2.0 GT-i 16 Liftback and GT-Four were officially sold in the UK. New for 1992, the wide body Liftback 2.0 GT-i 16 was offered in the Netherlands and Belgium. This was basically a GT-S with 3S-GE engine.

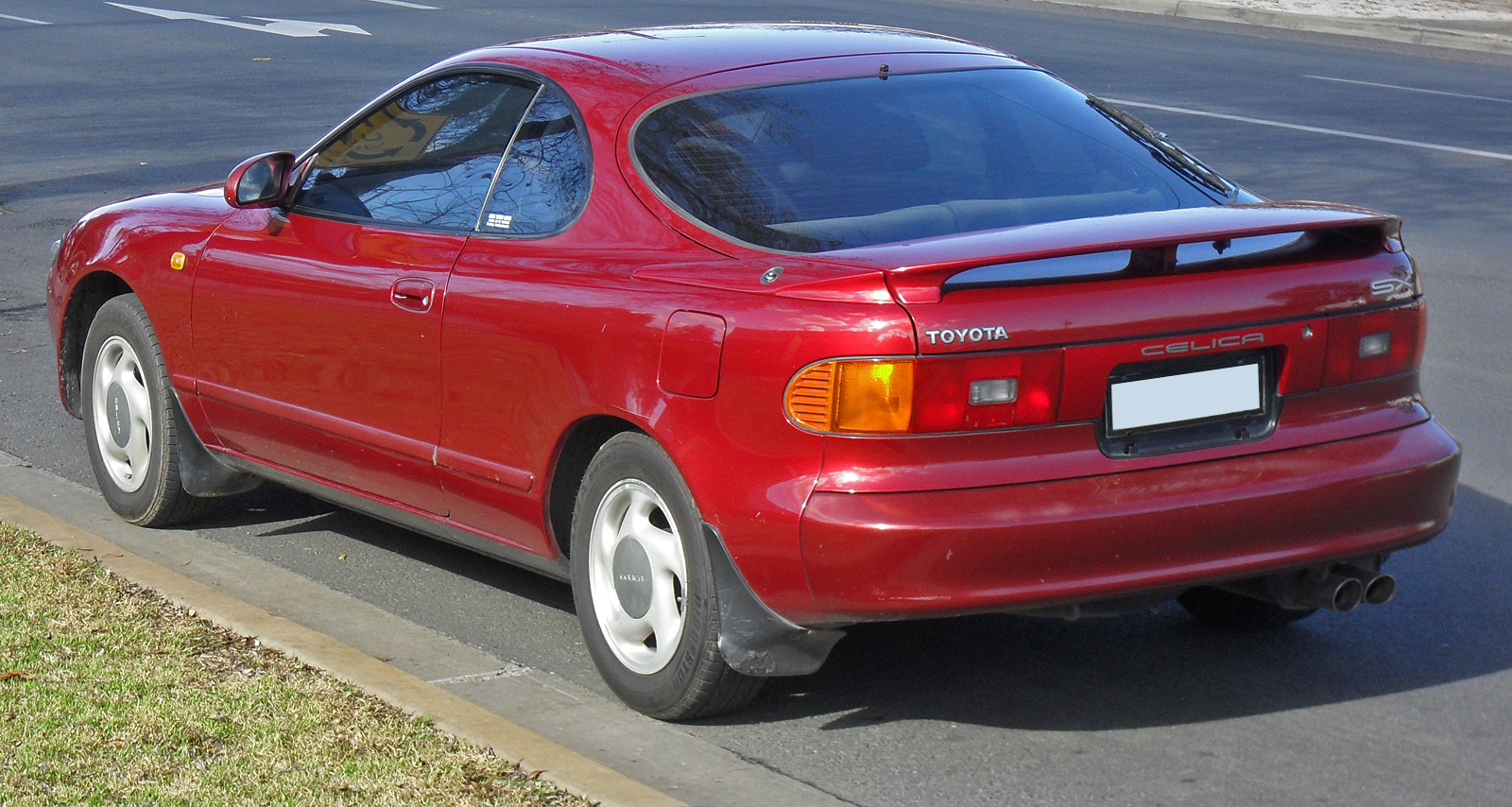
Pre-facelift Toyota Celica SX Liftback (ST184, Australia)

Model grades for Australian Celica were SX coupe, SX Liftback, GT-Four, and also 150 units limited edition GT-Four Group A Rallye. The Australian cars are less luxurious than Japanese market and North American market models. Initially, the GT-Four did not come with ABS and fog lamps, which became standard few months after the introduction. In 1993, the Limited Edition WRC Trophy model was offered in Australia. This is basically the SX with sport front seats from the GT-Four, cruise control, rear window shade / spoiler, and special decals.

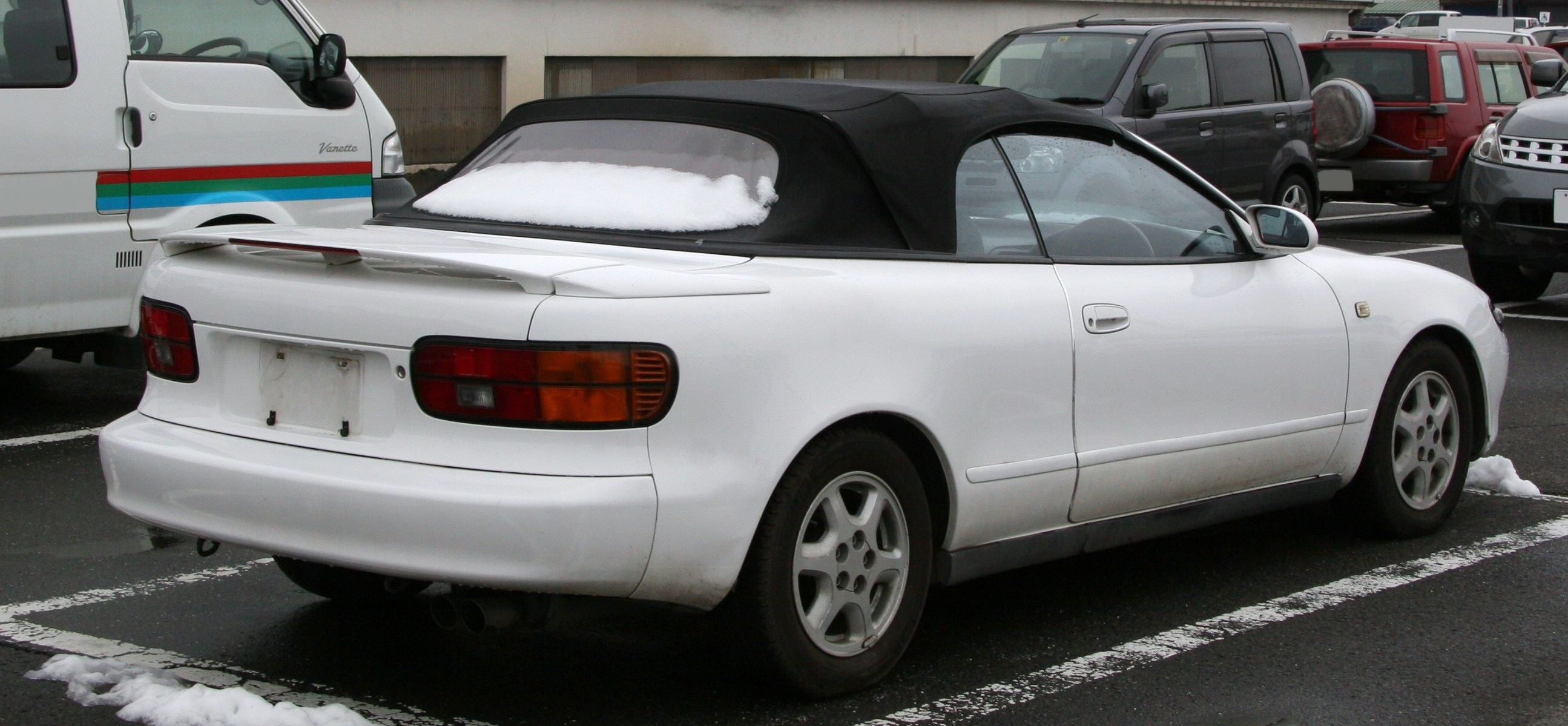
Pre-facelift Toyota Celica 4WS Convertible (ST183, Japan)

In August 1990, the wide body Liftback GT-Four A and Convertible, in base and Type G trim levels, were added into the Japanese Celica line up. Super Live Sound System with 10 speakers became standard on the GT-Four A and optional in other models except the S-R. The Celica convertible was built by American Sunroof Corporation (ASC) in California. It was offered as GT in the US with 5S-FE engine, and as base model and upmarket Type G in Japan or 2.0 GT-i 16 cabriolet in Europe with 3S-GE engine. The Japanese market convertible also has 4WS. To celebrate 20 years of Celica production, the 20th Anniversary GT-R was released for the Japanese market in December 1990. This limited edition GT-R has the GT-Four front bumper.

There are three different gearboxes for ST185 GT-Four. The E150F gearbox with 4.285 final gear ratio was installed in the regular Japanese version and All-Trac Turbo. The European and Australian models, as well as the RC/Carlos Sainz/Group A models, came with the E151F gearbox with 3.933 ratio. The Japanese market only GT-Four Rally, a limited edition lightweight rally version sold only in Japan (not to be confused with the Australian GT-Four Grp A Rallye model), has the E152F gearbox with close ratio on the 1st through 4th gear and 4.285 final ratio. It also came with steel wheels and without air conditioning, power windows, or a power antenna. The early model GT-Four Rally is based on the narrow body, and the facelift model is wide body with round fog lights. Also sold in Japan only was the GT-Four V. This was an economy version of normal body without alloy wheels, leather, or Super Live Sound System, but still came with fog lights, power windows, and optional sunroof.

Anti-lock brakes (ABS) were available on the GT-S and All-Trac for all four years and was available on the GT for 1992 and 1993 models. ABS, Leather interior, power sunroof, and System 10 premium sound system are optional on the GT-S and the 1990–1992 All-Trac Turbo, and standard on the 1993 All-Trac Turbo. With its sport-style interior, power-operated driver's seat, auto tilt-away steering wheel, and cruise control as standard equipment, the All-Trac Turbo (known as the GT-Four outside of the US) was the most expensive Celica yet. With a 2.0-liter turbocharged 3S-GTE producing 149 kW (200 hp), it was the most powerful Celica ever sold in the US.

Fifth Generation Models
Chassis code	Model(s)	Body style	2/4WS, FWD/4WD	Engine	Power	Torque	Markets	Japan price (¥1000)
AT180	ST-i (Europe), ST (North America, General)	Coupe, Liftback	2WS, FWD	4A-FE	77 kW (103 hp) at 6,000 rpm	138 Nm (101 lb-ft) at 4,800 rpm	Europe, North America, General	–
ST182	S-R	Liftback	2WS, FWD	3S-FE	93 kW (125 hp)	186 Nm (137 lb-ft) at 4,400 rpm	Japan	1464
ST182	Z-R	Liftback	2WS, FWD	3S-FE	93 kW (125 hp)	186 Nm (137 lb-ft) at 4,400 rpm	Japan	1608
ST182	GT-R	Liftback	2WS, FWD	3S-GE	121 kW (162 hp) at 6,800 rpm	191 Nm (142 lb-ft) at 4,800 rpm	Japan	1880
ST182	2.0 GT-i 16	Liftback (all), convertible (Europe only)	2WS, FWD	3S-GE	118 kW (158 hp) at 6,600 rpm	186 Nm (137 lb-ft) at 4,800 rpm	Europe, Middle East	–
ST182	2.0 GTS-i 16	Liftback wide-body	2WS, FWD	3S-GE	118 kW (158 hp) at 6,600 rpm	186 Nm (137 lb-ft) at 4,800 rpm	Belgium, The Netherlands	–
ST183	4WS S-R	Liftback	4WS, FWD	3S-FE	93 kW (125 hp) at 6,600 rpm	186 Nm (137 lb-ft) at 4,400 rpm	Japan	1554
ST183	4WS Z-R	Liftback	4WS, FWD	3S-FE	93 kW (125 hp)	186 Nm (137 lb-ft) at 4,400 rpm	Japan	1698
ST183	4WS GT-R	Liftback	4WS, FWD	3S-GE	121 kW (162 hp) at 6,800 rpm	191 Nm (142 lb-ft) at 4,800 rpm	Japan	1970
ST183	Active Sports	Liftback	4WS, FWD	3S-GE	121 kW (162 hp) at 6,800 rpm	191 Nm (142 lb-ft) at 4,800 rpm	Japan	3200
ST183	4WS convertible, 4WS convertible Type G	Convertible	4WS, FWD	3S-GE	121 kW (162 hp) at 6,800 rpm	191 Nm (142 lb-ft) at 4,800 rpm	Japan	2605
ST184	GT (North America), SX (Australia)	Convertible (North America only), Coupe & Liftback (all)	2WS, FWD	5S-FE	97–101 kW (130–135 hp) at 5,400 rpm	196 Nm (145 lb-ft) at 4,400 rpm	US, Canada, Australia	–
ST184	GT-S	Liftback wide-body	2WS, FWD	5S-FE	97–101 kW (130–135 hp) at 5,400 rpm	196 Nm (145 lb-ft) at 4,400 rpm	North America, Thailand	–
ST185	GT-Four, GT-Four V	Liftback normal-body	2WS, 4WD	3S-GTE	165 kW (221 hp) at 6,000 rpm	304 Nm (224 lb-ft) at 3,200 rpm	Japan	2685
ST185	GT-Four A, Turbo All-Trac, Turbo 4WD	Liftback wide-body	2WS, 4WD	3S-GTE	149–165 kW (200–221 hp) at 6,000 rpm	271 Nm (200 lb-ft) – 304 Nm (224 lb-ft) at 3,200 rpm	Japan, Europe, North America, Australia, New Zealand	2900
ST185	GT-Four RC, Turbo 4WD Carlos Sainz, GT-Four Grp A Rallye	Liftback wide-body	2WS, 4WD	3S-GTE	153–173 kW (205–232 hp) at 6,000 rpm	271 Nm (200 lb-ft) – 304 Nm (224 lb-ft) at 3,200 rpm	Japan, Europe, Singapore, Australia, New Zealand	3171

=== Facelift ===
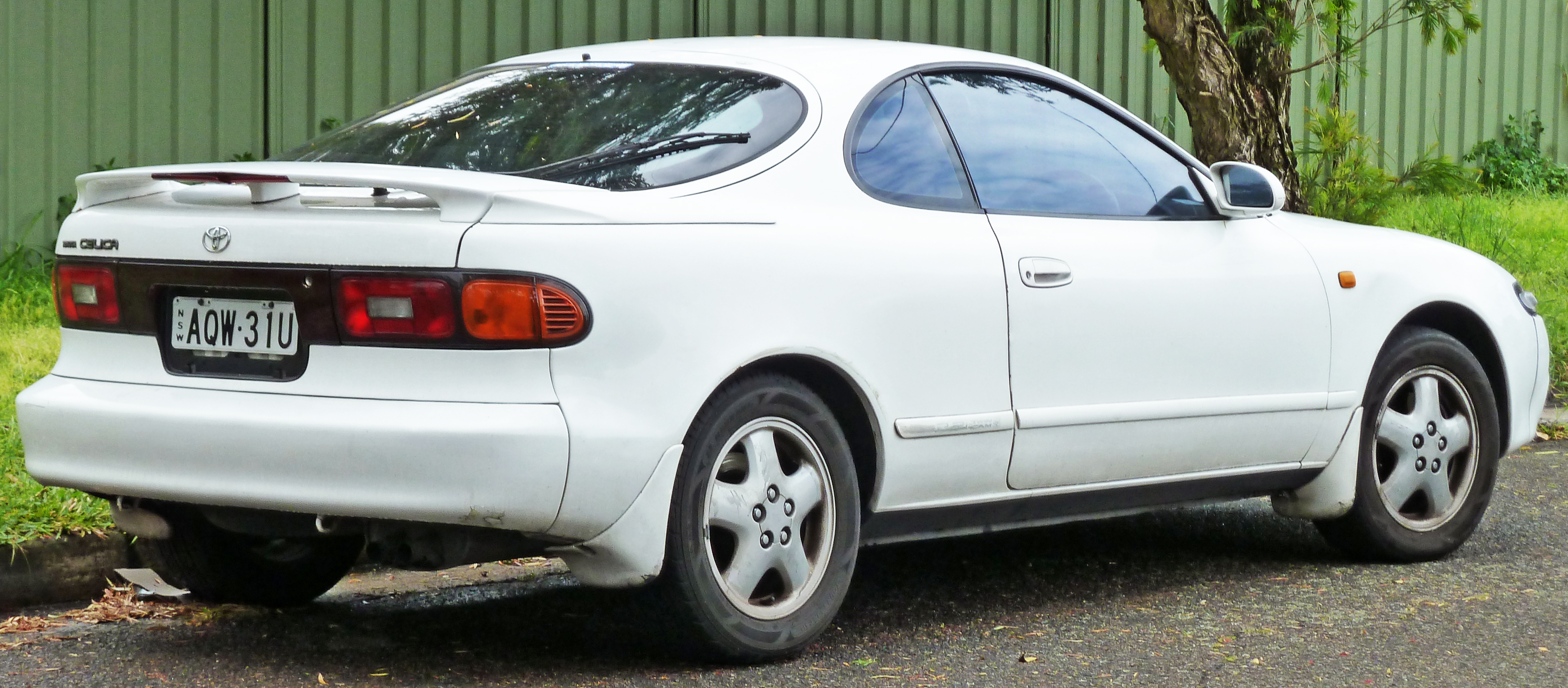
Facelift Toyota Celica 2.2 SX Liftback (ST184R, Australia)

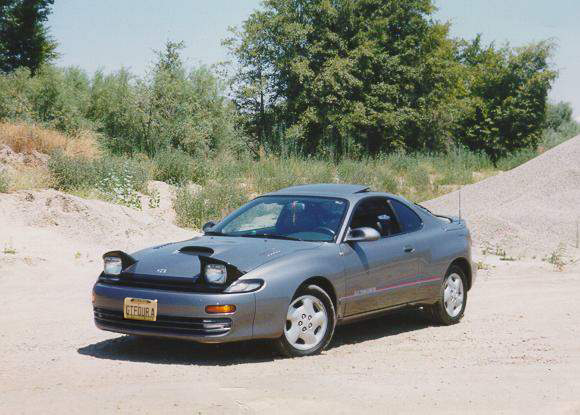
1993 Toyota Celica All-Trac Turbo (ST185, US)

In August 1991, Toyota facelifted the Celica for the 1992 model year. Changes included:

- Stiffer anti-roll bar was added and suspension spring rates were increased.
- New three-way catalytic converter.
- Toyota ellipse emblems on the hood and trunk.
- Taillights redesign (with smoke red frame).
- Improved gear linkage and a shorter gearshift.
- The Japanese market models received 3-point rear seat belts.
- New 5S-FE, producing 100 kW (134 hp) and 196 N⋅m (145 lb⋅ft) of torque.
- Front discs were now 277 mm (10.9 in) and ventilated.
- The front-drive models (except for the wide body Liftback GT-S, which used the same front bumper as the 4WD models) received a new style bumper.
- The export version GT-Four / All-Trac Turbo and GT-S retained automatic air conditioner, but the push button fan switch was replaced by the more conventional rotary type.
- The North American GT and Australian SX models received standard fog lights.
- 15-inch wheels on the Japanese Z-R (optional) and GT-R, European and North American GT, and Australian SX models (standard) fitted with 205/55VR tires.
- Discontinued Japanese market models: 4WS S-R, Active Sports, and narrow body GT-Four.
- The A was dropped from the GT-Four A and the wide-body turbo model was simply known as the GT-Four.
- New round fog lights with yellow bulbs for the Japanese market GT-Four.
- The Japanese market only GT-Four Rally uses the wide body shell.
- The Cruise Control Package (Cruise Control and sunroof), SD Package (ABS, driver-side SRS Airbag, and Ultrasonic raindrop removal door mirror), and Luxury Package (10-speaker Super Live Sound System, Ecsaine seats for the Z-R and GT-R, or leather seats for the GT-Four, and Wireless door remote control) became optional on the Japanese market Z-R, GT-R, and GT-Four models. However, not all the packages could be combined.

==== GT-Four RC ====
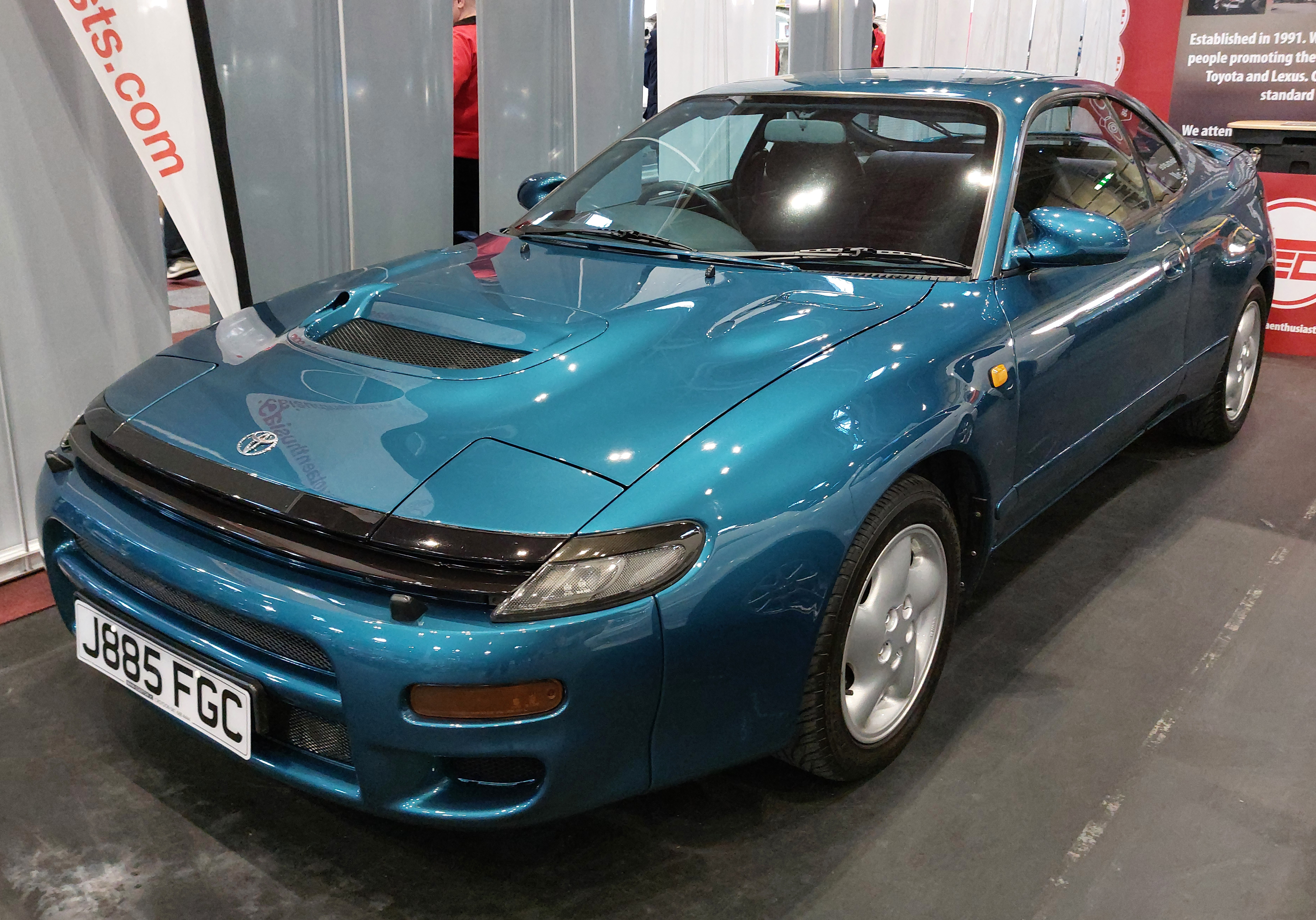
1992 Toyota Celica GT-Four Carlos Sainz Limited Edition (ST185, UK)

For the FIA WRC Group A homologation, the special rally edition of 5000 units named Celica GT-Four RC was launched in Japan in September 1991. The export models are called the Carlos Sainz (CS) Limited Edition in Europe and Singapore (in honour of the famous European World Rally Champion) or Group A Rallye in Australia.

Special features include:

- Different intercooler (water-to-air as opposed to air-to-air) which Toyota Team Europe wanted so they could more easily tune their WRC car.
- More aggressively tuned ECU.
- Shortened shift lever throw and clutch pedal travel.
- Triple cone synchromesh on gears 2 and 3, up from double cone.
- Different hood, the emphasis of which is to get rid of heat as fast as possible (instead of scooping in air, as is the case with the standard ST185 hood).
- Different style of front bumper that is much lighter and has more openings than the one on the regular GT-Four with air-to-air intercooler.

Out of the 5,000 units, 1,800 stayed in Japan, 3,000 were for the selected European countries, 150 were delivered to Australia, 25 went to Singapore, and a few were exported to other markets.

== Sixth generation (T200; 1993) ==
Sixth generation
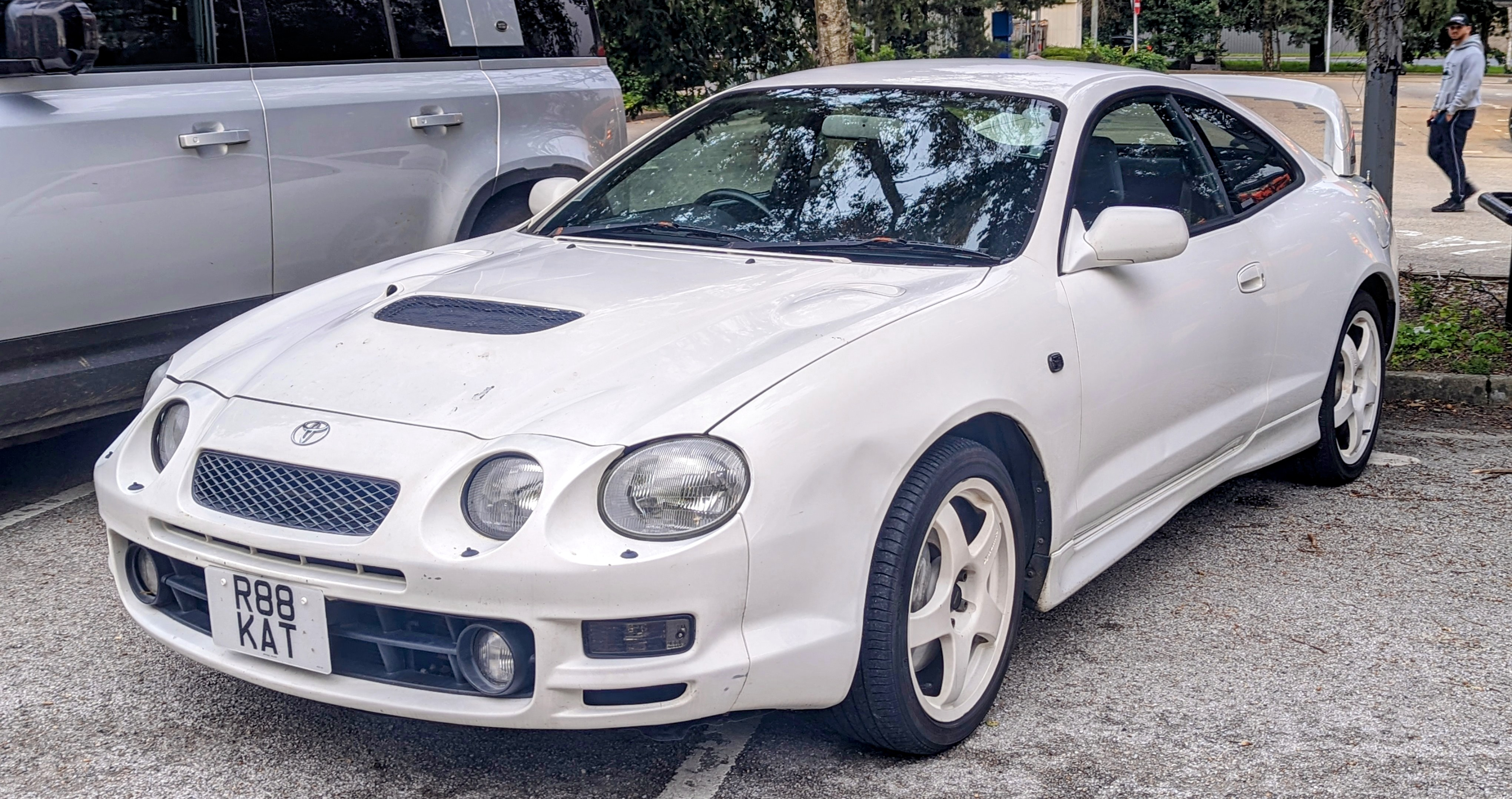
- Facelift Toyota Celica GT-Four (ST205, JDM-spec in the UK)

Overview
- Model code: T200
- Production: October 1993 – June 1999
- Assembly: Japan: Tahara, Aichi (Tahara plant)
- Designer: Takashi Okuda

Body and chassis
- Class: Sports car
- Body style: 3-door liftback coupé; 2-door notchback coupé; 2-door convertible
- Layout: Front-engine, front-wheel-drive; Front-engine, four-wheel-drive (GT-Four)
- Related: Toyota Carina ED; Toyota Corona EXiV; Toyota Curren; Toyota Carina; Toyota Corona/Carina E; Toyota Caldina

Powertrain
- Engine: 1.8 L 7A-FE I4; 2.0 L 3S-FE I4; 2.0 L 3S-GE I4; 2.0 L 3S-GTE I4 turbo; 2.2 L 5S-FE I4
- Transmission: 4-speed automatic; 5-speed manual

Dimensions
- Wheelbase: 2,535 mm (99.8 in)
- Length: Liftback: 4,420–4,435 mm (174.0–174.6 in); Coupe: 4,495 mm (177.0 in); Convertible: 4,505 mm (177.4 in)
- Width: 1,750 mm (69 in)
- Height: Liftback: 1,305 mm (51.4 in); Coupe: 1,310 mm (52 in); Convertible: 1,325 mm (52.2 in)
- Curb weight: Coupe: 1,090–1,250 kg (2,403–2,756 lb); Liftback: 1,160–1,390 kg (2,557–3,064 lb); Convertible: 1,250–1,350 kg (2,756–2,976 lb)

In October 1993, Toyota launched the sixth-generation Celica for the 1994 model year. Celicas were available in either notchback coupe or liftback form, the convertible would come later. New safety equipment in the form of driver (and then later passenger) airbags were standard in most markets, and anti-lock brakes (ABS) were available on all models.

=== Markets ===
==== Japan ====
Initially the Japanese market models were SS-I and SS-II. The ST205 GT-Four was launched in February 1994 and the Convertible in September of the same year. The width of this generation was no longer in compliance with Japanese Government regulations concerning exterior dimensions, which added an additional tax liability on Japanese buyers. This generation also saw a badge engineered version with different headlights, called the Toyota Curren, and was sold only in Japan at Toyota Vista Store locations, allowing the Celica to be sold at different retail sales channels. The Celica was exclusive to Toyota Corolla Store locations.

The fourth-generation convertible was introduced in September 1994. Unlike the American Convertible, the Japanese Convertible and European GT cabriolet are the 3S-GE powered ST202. The Japanese market soft top Celica was offered as the base model Convertible Type X with either manual or automatic transmission, and the fully equipped automatic only Convertible.

==== North America ====
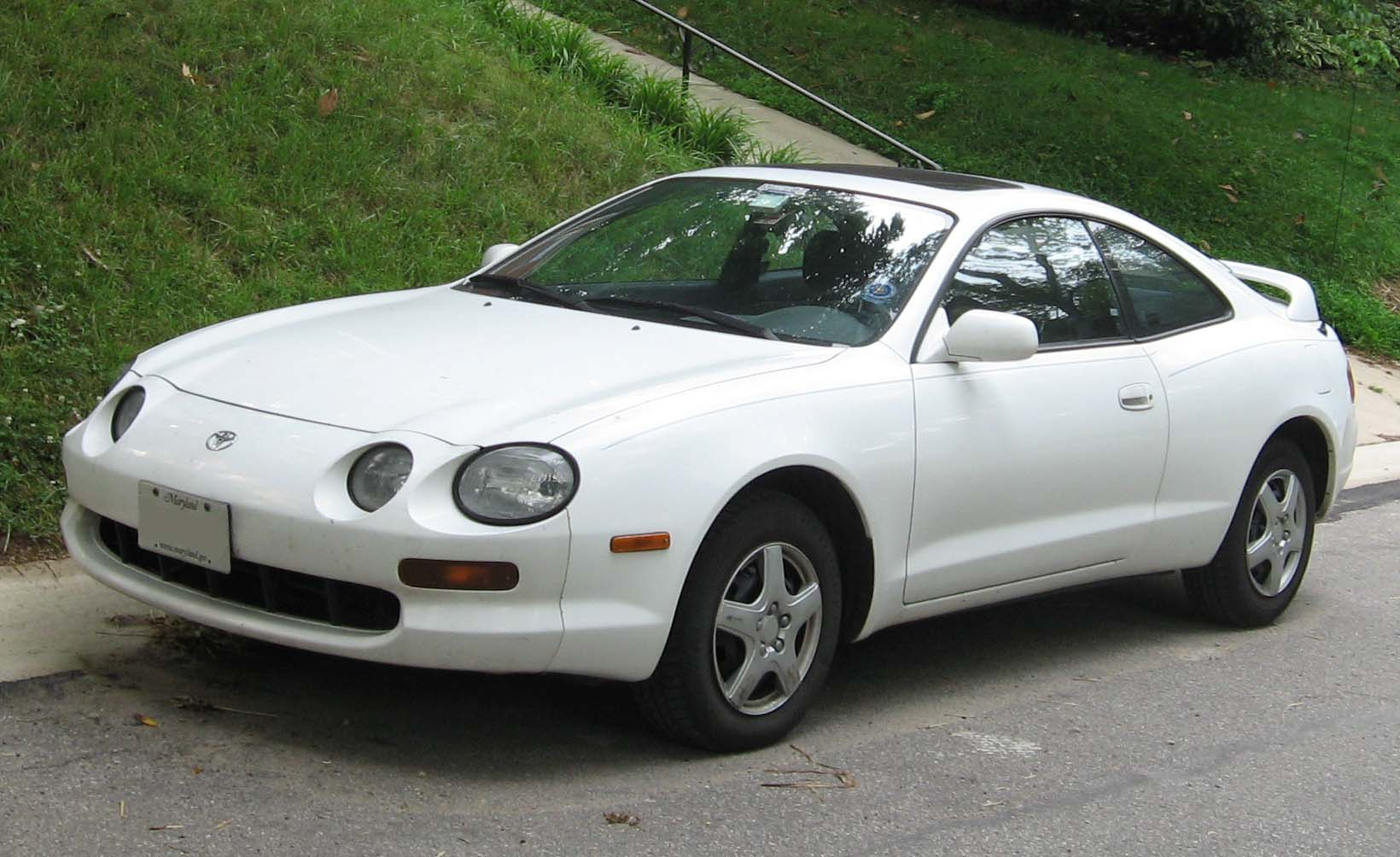
Pre-facelift Toyota Celica GT Liftback (ST204, US)

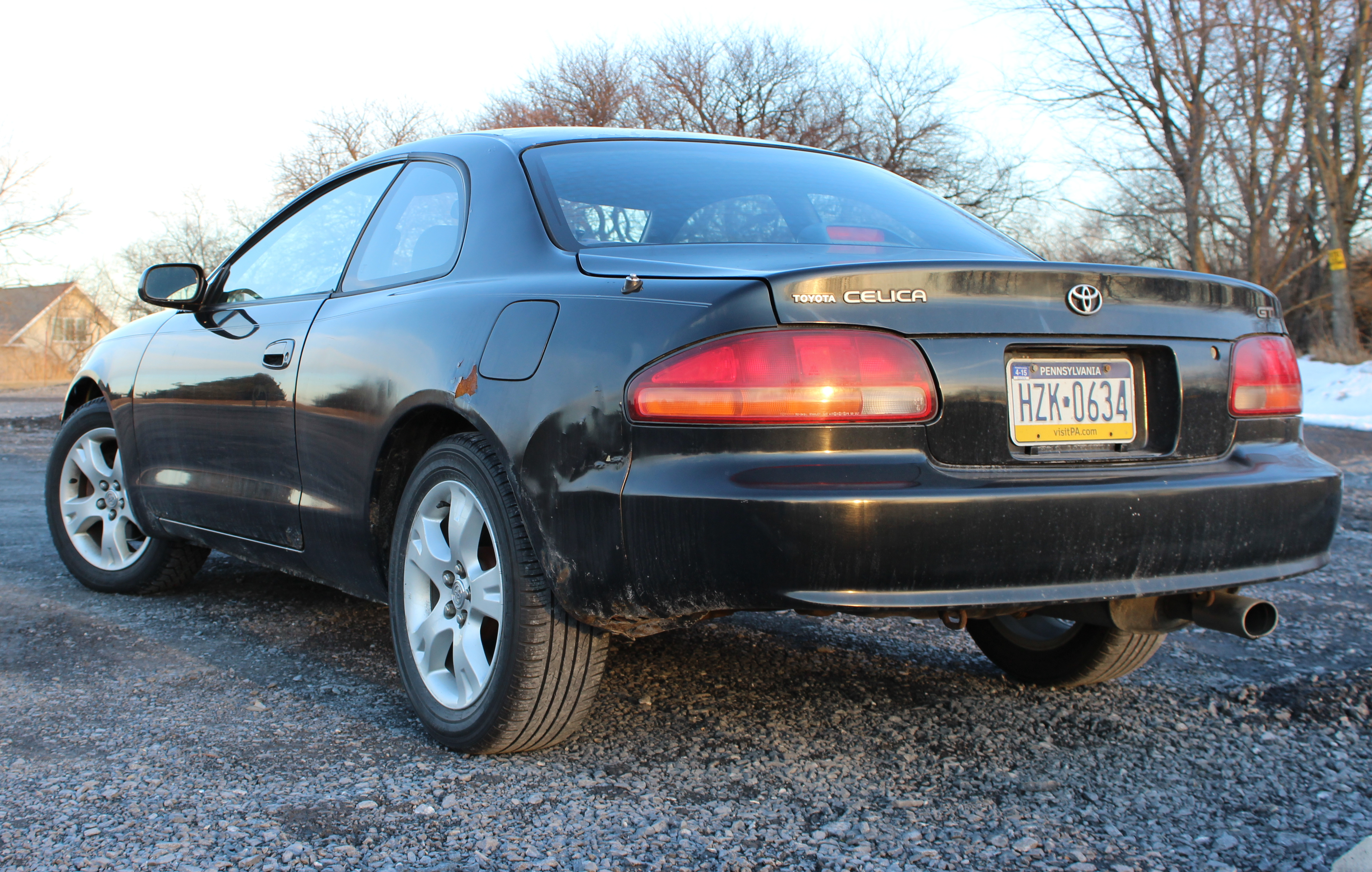
Toyota Celica GT notchback coupé (ST204, North America only)

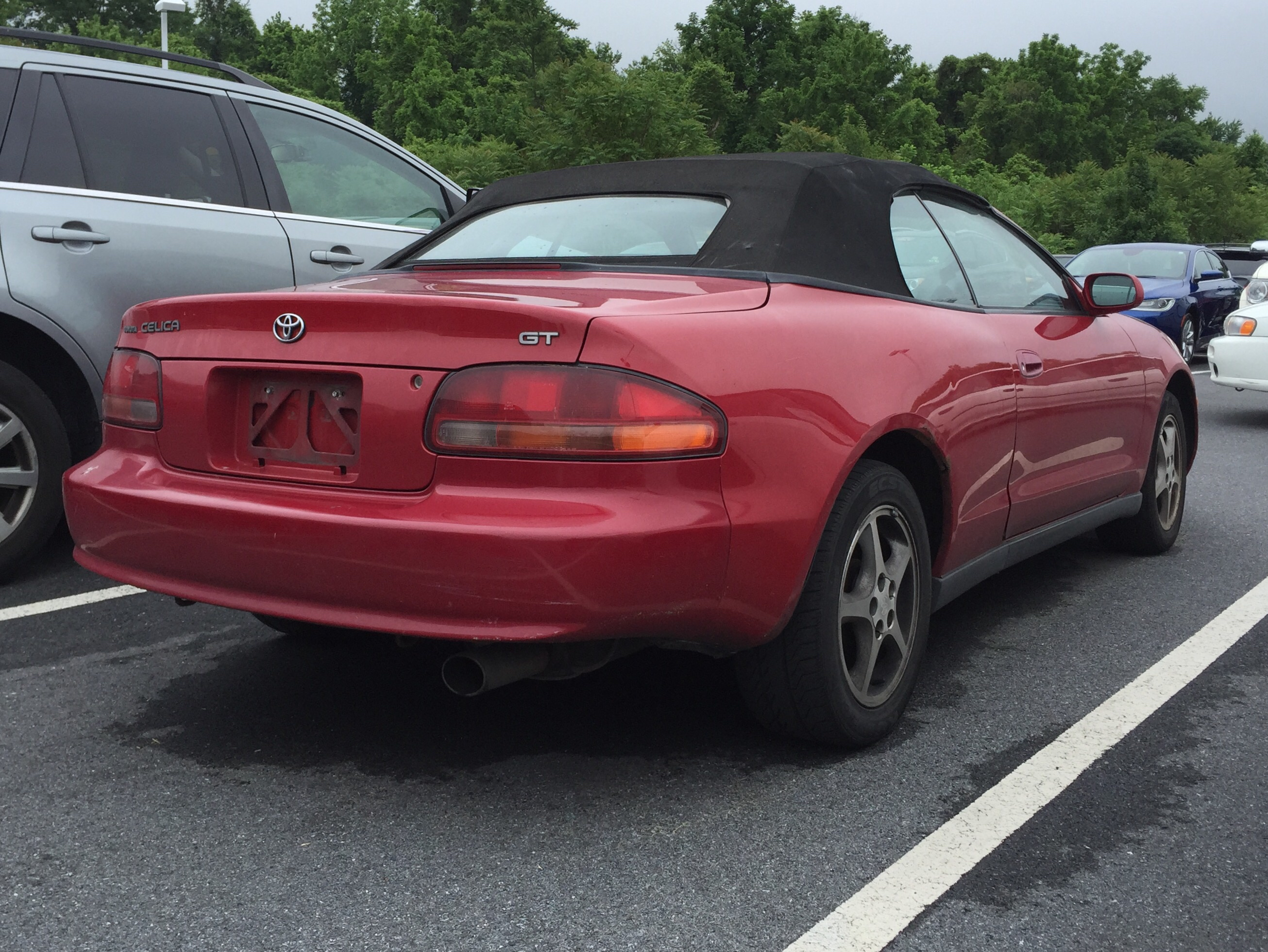
Toyota Celica GT Convertible (ST204, US)

For the US market, the Celica was only available in ST and GT trims for the 1994 model year, but the addition of the optional "Sports Package" to the GT Liftback produced GT-S-like handling. All models came with standard dual SRS Airbags. The ST had a new 1.8-liter 7A-FE engine which could also be found in the Corolla, while the GT was powered by the carried-over 2.2-liter 5S-FE engine which featured dual overhead camshafts and fuel injection, could also be found in the Camry. The turbocharged All-Trac was no longer offered in the US. The 7A-FE is rated at 110 hp (82 kW) and 110 lb⋅ft (149 N⋅m), while the 5S-FE is rated at 135 hp (101 kW) and 145 lb⋅ft (197 N⋅m). In Canada, the Celica GT liftback with "Sports Package" are badged GT-S.

The fourth-generation convertible was introduced in 1994. Based on the GT coupe, the conversion took place in the ASC facility in Rancho Dominguez, California. The vehicle arrived in the US as a partially assembled vehicle. At ASC, the roof was removed and a three-layer insulated and power-operated top was installed, producing a vehicle that was virtually water and windproof. Like its coupe and liftback siblings, the American GT convertible is ST204 with 5S-FE engine.

==== Europe ====
For the European and UK market, the 6th generation Celica was introduced in February 1994 for the GT Liftback (ST202), and in May 1994 for the GT-Four (ST205). The launch date of the base model 1.8 ST (AT200) were varied from one country to another, which was as early as March 1994 for the Dutch market, but not until mid-1995 for the UK market. The GT Convertible (ST202) was only offered in few European countries from late 1994 or early 1995.

All models of the 6th generation Celica officially sold in Europe have manual transmission. In Germany, the GT Liftback came with standard Super-Strut Suspension. In Austria, the ST202 Liftback came with either regular MacPherson Strut front suspension or Super-Strut. The regular model was called GT-i, and the Super-Strut model was badged GT-S. The cars equipped with Super-Strut suspension also came with front limited-slip-differential and G-Sensor 4-channel ABS. These features were offered as option package in Switzerland. For most other countries in the continent and the UK, the GT Liftback was equipped with regular front suspension.

To celebrate Didier Auriol's victory as the 1994 World Rally Champion, Toyota France released 200 units of the "Didier Auriol" limited edition in March 1995. Based on the 1.8 ST, it came exclusively in Super White with red and green decals, special rally logo on the front fenders, numbered plaque above the center air conditioner outlets, and special edition dark gray floor mats with red edging and "Celica" logo. It also came with standard rear spoiler and CD player which were optional on the regular ST.

==== Asia Pacific ====
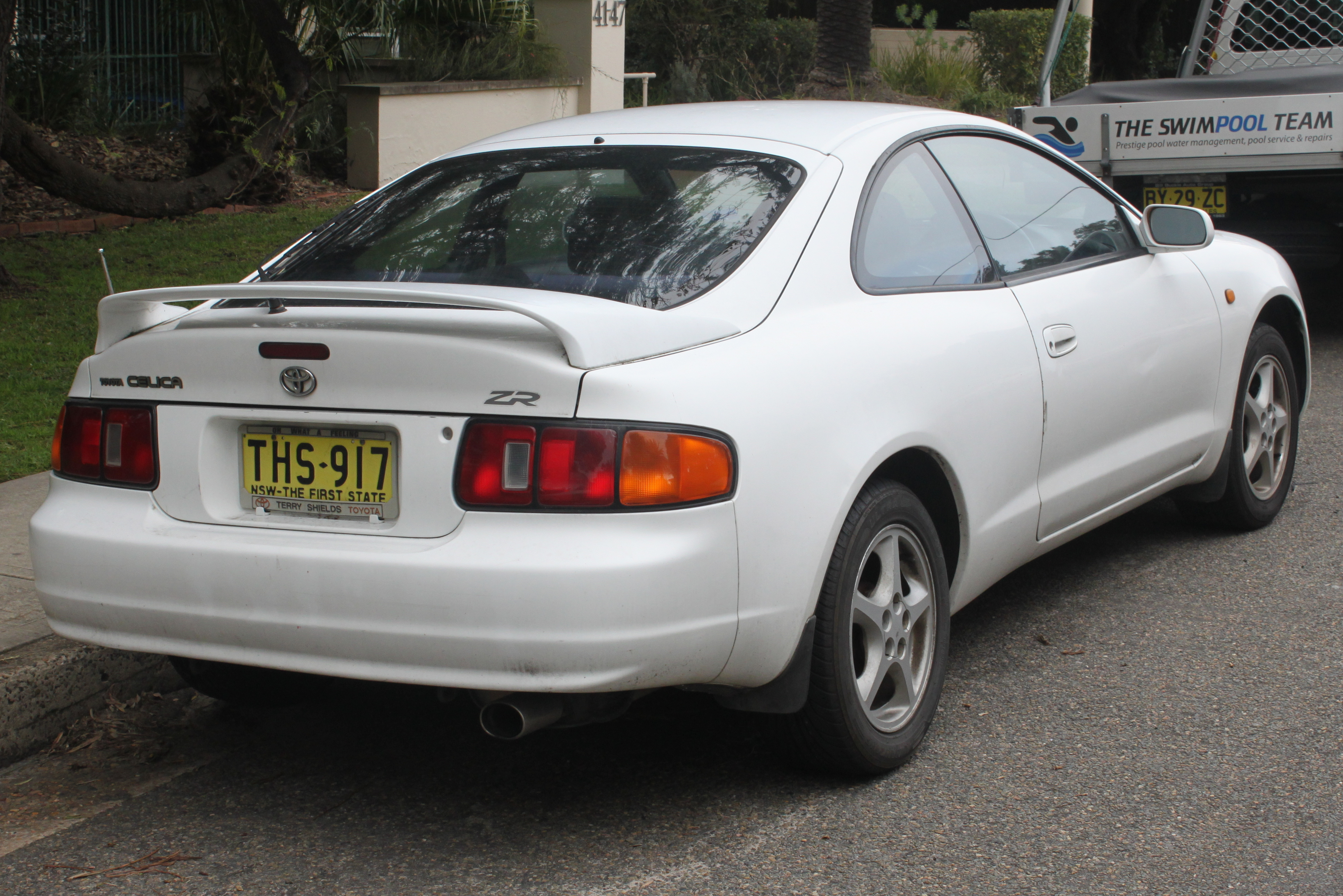
Pre-facelift Toyota Celica ZR Liftback (ST204, Australia)

In Australia, the 5S-FE powered Celica ST204 was offered in SX and ZR trim levels. The ZR has standard SRS Airbag, fog lights, alloys, and other features. The ST205 Celica GT-Four was available in Australia only in 1994. There was a limited delivery of only 77 units, and each vehicle came with an individually numbered plaque in the cabin and Group A Rallye emblem on the boot. All Australian models were taken from the 2,500 units homologation run and had black leather interior and a full-size spare wheel. The only option being a moonroof (17 of the 77 were available with this feature).

New Zealand received the Celica very similar to Australia. The ST204 was available as the base model and upgraded GS which were the equivalent of Australian SX and ZR respectively. The ST205 GT-Four was offered in the very small numbers, but unlike Australia, the facelift model was also offered in New Zealand.

=== GT-Four ===
Production of the GT-Four (or previously known as All-Trac in the US), continued for the Japanese, Australian, European, and British markets. This ST205 version was to be the most powerful Celica produced to date, producing 178 kW (239 hp) (export version) or 187 kW (251 hp) (Japanese market) from an updated 3S-GTE engine. Influenced strongly by Toyota Team Europe, Toyota's factory team in the World Rally Championship, the final version of the GT-Four included improvements such as an all-aluminum hood to save weight, four-channel ABS (with G-force sensor), an improved turbocharger (incorrectly known by enthusiasts as the CT20B), and Super Strut Suspension.

The 2500 homologation cars built to allow Toyota to enter the GT-Four as a Group A car in the World Rally Championship also sported extras such as all of the plumbing required to activate an antilag system, a water spray bar for the intercooler's front heat exchanger, a water injection system for detonation protection, a hood spoiler mounted in front of the windscreen to stop hood flex at high speed and the standard rear spoiler mounted on riser blocks. The car proved to be quite competitive in the 1995 World Championship. However, the team was banned from competition for a year after the car's single victory due to turbocharger fixing—a device that meant there was no air path restriction on the intake—when the jubilee clip (worm-drive hose clamp) was undone this would flick back into place so as to go un-noticed by inspectors. Toyota has always claimed that they knew nothing of the fix—but opponents say it was a very cleverly engineered device.

=== Facelift ===
In August 1995, minor changes were given to all Japanese market Celica Liftback models, and the SS-III was added to the line-up. All models received new rear combination lamps, and if fitted, the new style rear spoiler. The front wheel drive models received new a front bumper design. The base model SS-I got restyled 14-inch wheel covers. The SS-III came with standard Super Strut Suspension, power steering cooler, twin piston calipers, helical LSD, shorter steering ratio rack and side aerodynamic rocker panels. The GT-Four also got side rocker panels, restyled rear spoiler, and new 6-spoke alloy wheels. In January 1996, facelift was given to the Japanese market Celica Convertible.

The 1996 Celica for export market received the same front restyling as the Japanese models, although the tail-lights were untouched. The new front bumper has two smaller sections on each side of a smaller air dam as opposed to a single large air dam in previous models. Also new were optional side skirts to improve its aerodynamic efficiency, as well as a redesigned rear spoiler. The North American GT and Australian ZR models came with standard fog lights, and the ST and SX models without the optional fog lights had black grilles fill in their place.

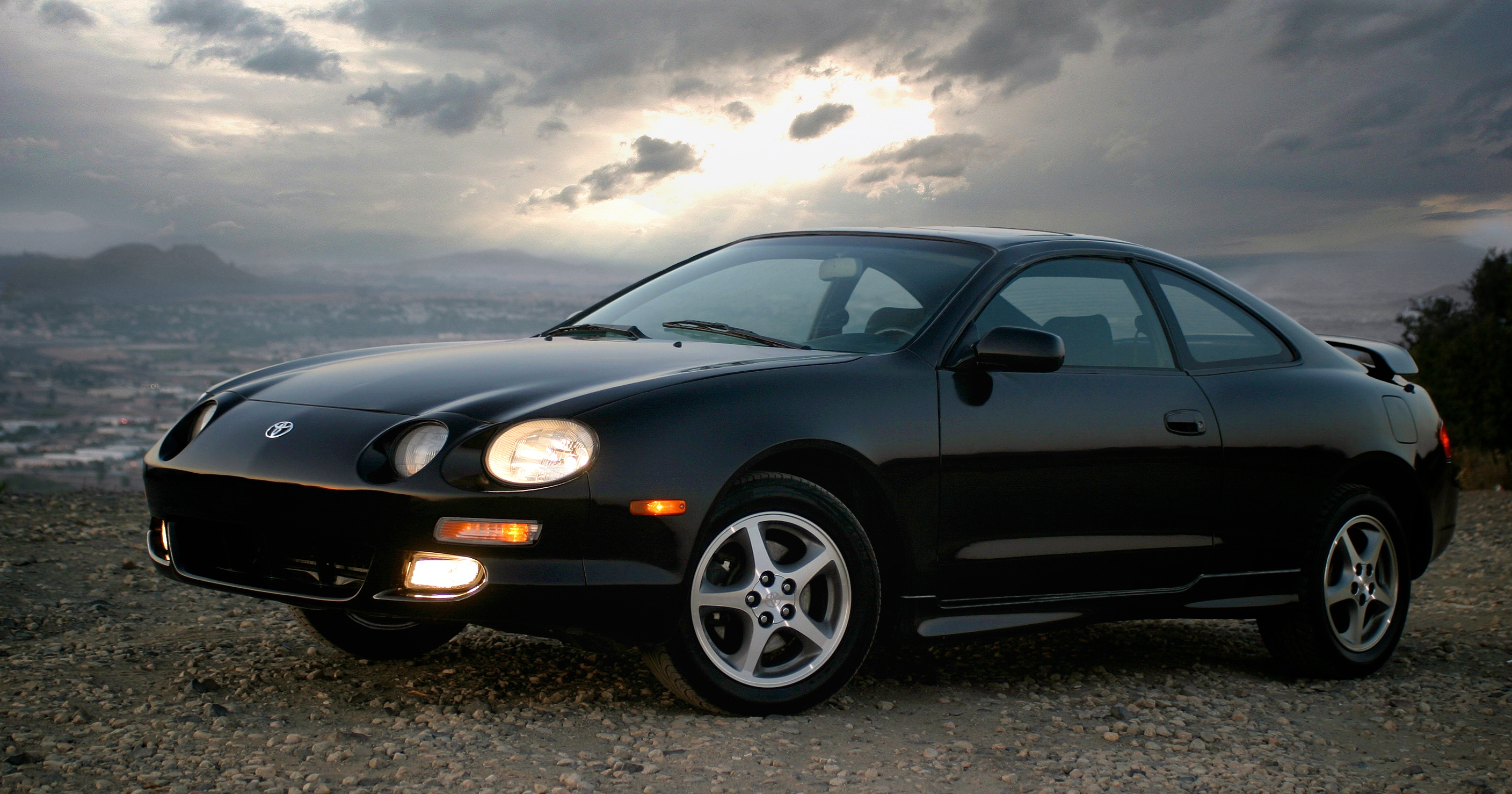
Facelift Toyota Celica GT Liftback (ST204, US)

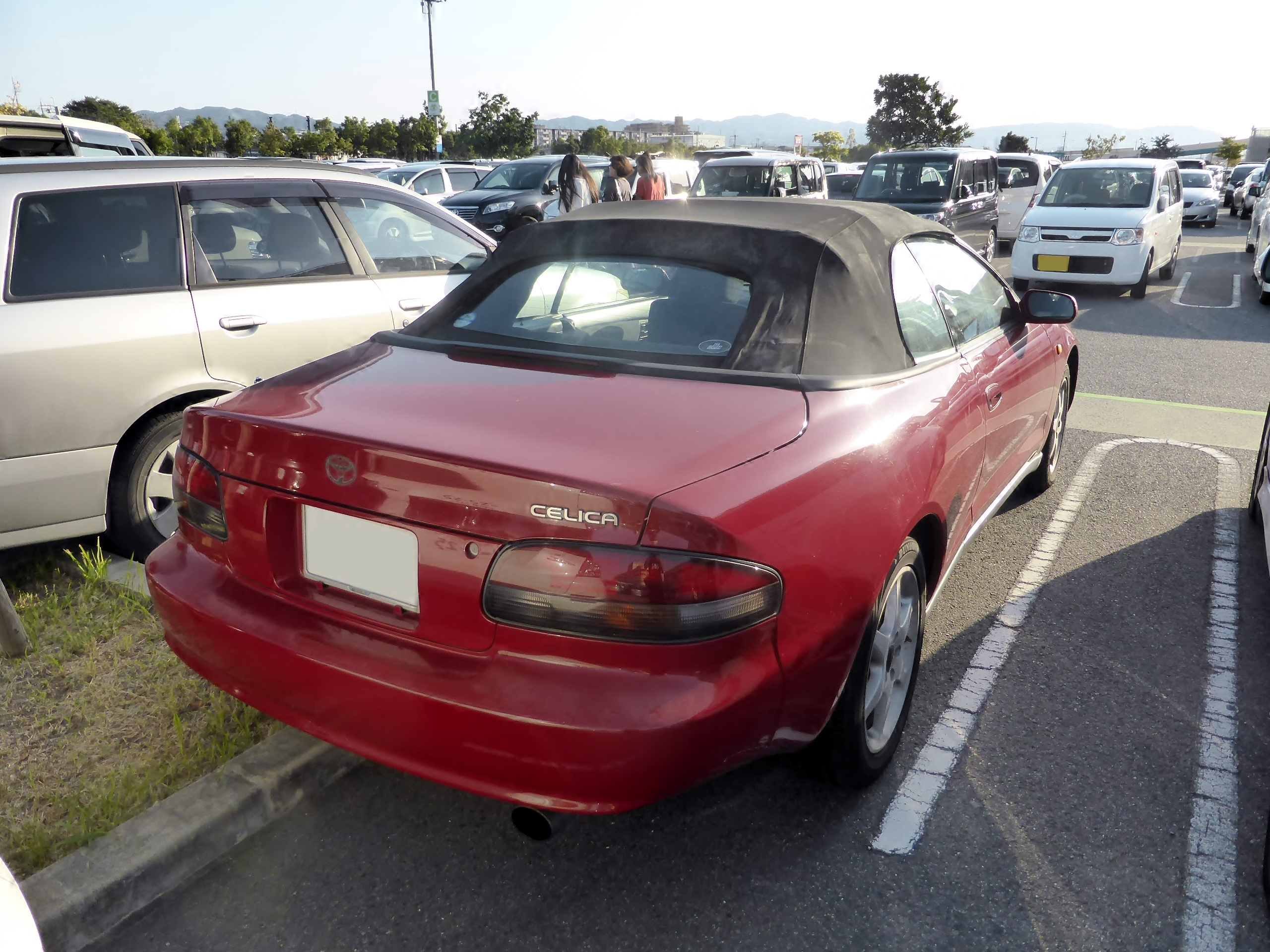
Facelift Toyota Celica Convertible (ST202, Japan only)

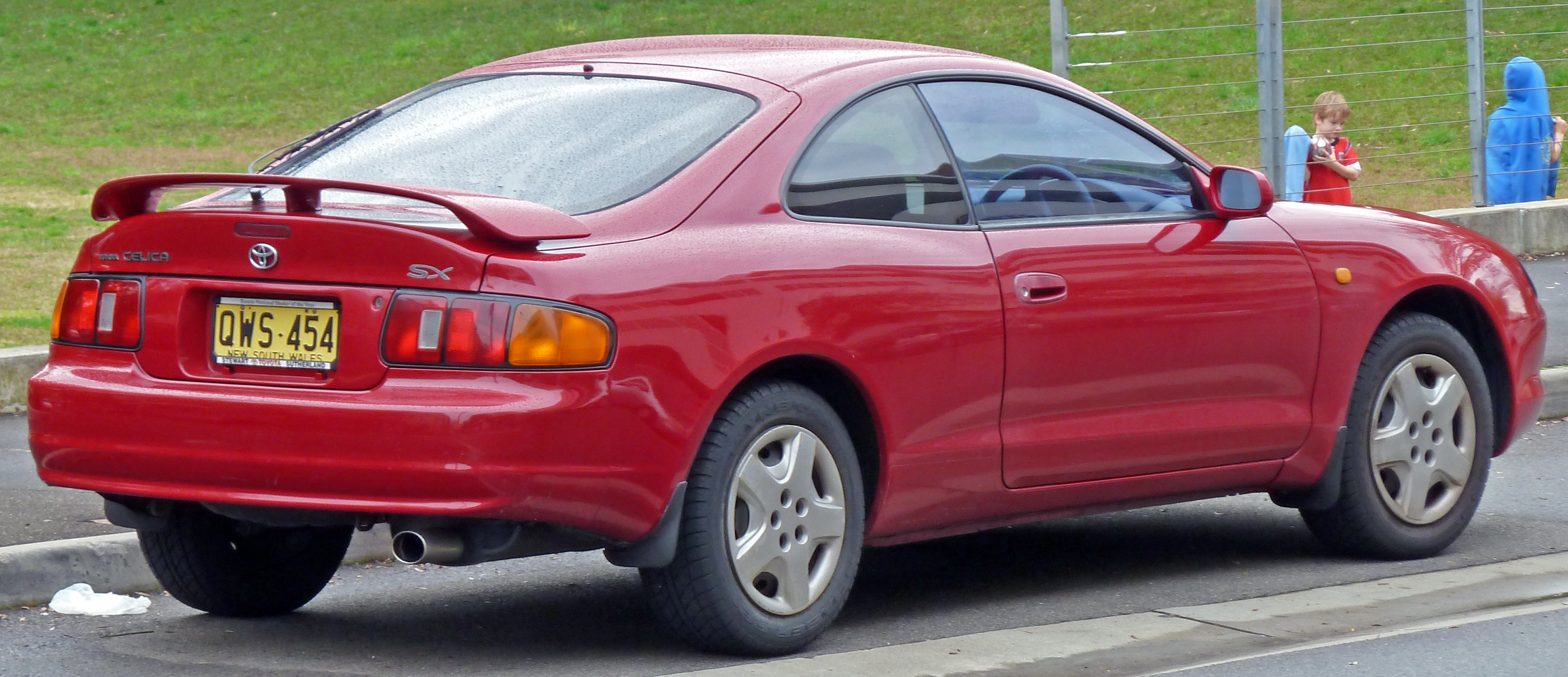
Facelift Toyota Celica SX Liftback (ST204, Australia)

To celebrate 25 years of the Celica, the SS-I and SS-III Special Edition were released in Japan, and the 25th Anniversary ST Limited Liftback and GT Convertible marked this occasion in the US. These Special Edition models have emblems on the front fenders, and inside on the rear-view mirror hanger, as well as the name Celica embroidered on the front seats.

For 1997, the only change in the North American Celica line up was the discontinuation of the GT coupe. Another minor change was given to Japanese market Celicas in December 1997. Projector headlights were standard for all models. The 3S-GE engine on the SS-II, SS-III and convertible was now the BEAMS version with VVT-i. The WRC style high rear spoiler returned on the GT-Four and was also standard on the SS-III. Recaro SR-II front seats were optional for the SS-III and GT-Four. The 4WS SS-I was discontinued.

In 1998, the ST model was discontinued in the US, leaving only GT models. In addition, the GT notchback coupe returned after a year's absence. In the UK, Toyota released the SR based on the 1.8 ST. The SR has a full body kit, mesh grille, 16-inch alloys, and upgraded sound system. For the Australian market, the limited edition SX-R was offered in 1998–1999. Based on the SX, this model came with black/red interior, white-faced speedometer and tachometer, fog lights and alloy wheels. The US Celica line up was simplified even further in 1999 by eliminating all coupes, leaving only the GT Liftback and GT convertible. The GT-Four was still offered in Japan. Also in early 1999, Toyota released pictures of their XYR concept car, which would soon become the next generation Celica.

Summary of sixth generation models
Model code	Body style	Engine	Trim level	Market
AT200	Coupe, Liftback	7A-FE	ST, ST Limited, SR	North America, Europe
ST202	Liftback, convertible	3S-FE, 3S-GE	SS-I (3S-FE), SS-II, SS-III, GT (3S-GE)	Japan, Europe (liftback and convertible), Hong Kong & Singapore (GT Liftback only)
ST203	Liftback	3S-FE	SS-I 4WS	Japan
ST204	Coupe, Liftback, Convertible	5S-FE	SX, SX-R, ZR, GT	North America (all body styles), Australia, New Zealand & Thailand (liftback only)
ST205	Liftback	3S-GTE	GT-Four	Japan, Europe, Australia, New Zealand

== Seventh generation (T230; 1999) ==
Seventh generation
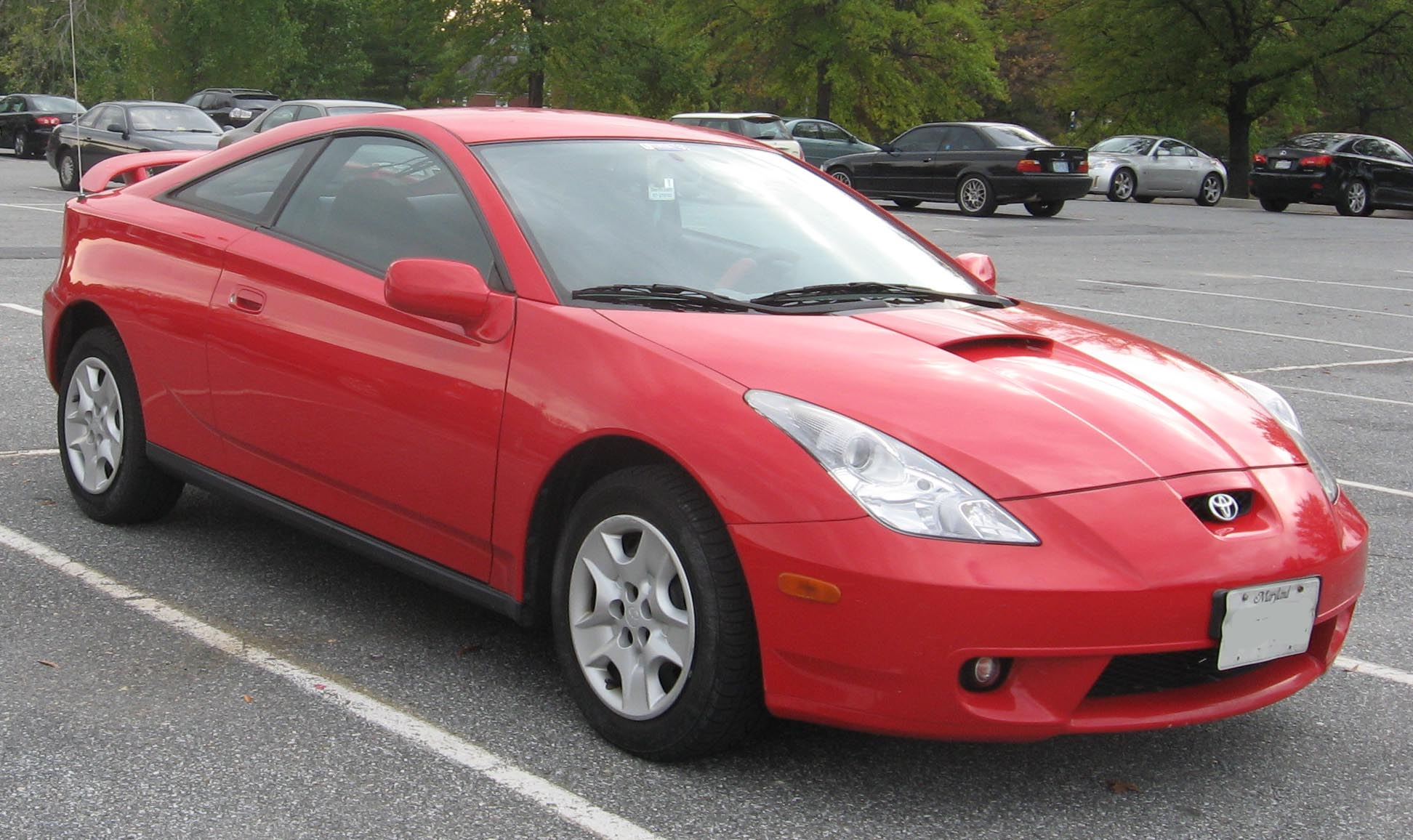
- Pre-facelift Toyota Celica GT (ZZT230, US)

Overview
- Model code: T230
- Production: July 1999 – April 2006
- Assembly: Japan: Susono, Shizuoka (Higashi-Fuji plant)
- Designer: Alan R. Schneider, Yasuhiko Mizuhata, Hiroyuki Metsugi (1997)

Body and chassis
- Class: Sports car
- Body style: 3-door liftback coupé
- Layout: Front-engine, front-wheel-drive
- Platform: Toyota MC platform

Powertrain
- Engine: 1.8 L 1ZZ-FE VVT-i I4 (ZZT230); 1.8 L 2ZZ-GE VVTL-i I4 (ZZT231)
- Transmission: 4-speed automatic; 5-speed manual; 6-speed manual

Dimensions
- Wheelbase: 2,600 mm (102.4 in)
- Length: 4,335 mm (170.7 in)
- Width: 1,735 mm (68.3 in)
- Height: 1,310 mm (51.4 in)
- Curb weight: 1,090–1,180 kg (2,403–2,601 lb)

In July 1999, Toyota began production of the seventh-generation Celica, with sales beginning late that year. It closely resembled the XYR concept with the exception of the front bumper and rear spoiler, while omitting the previously available coupe body style. This new generation of the Celica was an element of Toyota Project Genesis, a failed effort to bring younger buyers to the marque in the United States. Efforts were made to make the car light in weight and cost less to produce. Power window and door lock controls were placed in the center console so only one set was necessary for both doors. Initial sunroofs were made of polymer plastic instead of the traditional glass. The seventh-generation Celica was assembled by Kanto Auto Works at its Higashi-Fuji plant in Susono, Shizuoka Prefecture, Japan.

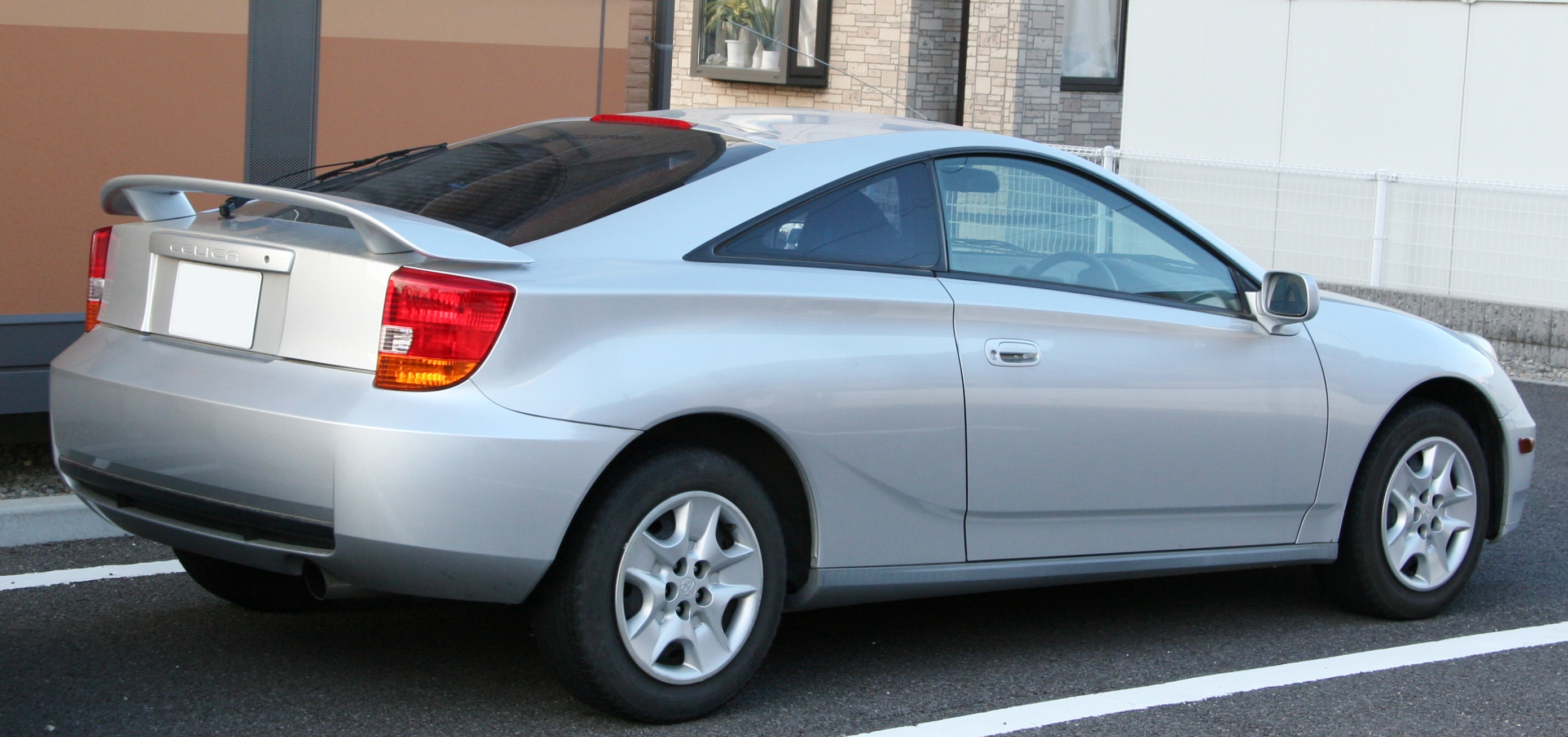
Pre-facelift Toyota Celica SS-II (ZZT231, Japan)

Only the Liftback body style was offered with the choice of two different engines. The ZZT230 model is powered by a relatively economical 1.8 L 4-cylinder 1ZZ-FE engine rated at 140 hp (142 PS; 104 kW) and the ZZT231 model is powered by a higher-performance 1.8 L 4-cylinder 2ZZ-GE engine rated at 192 hp (195 PS; 143 kW) (in Europe and Japan), co-developed with Yamaha, the latter featuring a two-step variable valve lift control in conjunction with its variable valve timing. Unlike its predecessors, the seventh-generation Celica did not offer an option for an all-wheel drive drivetrain. In 2004, CNNMoney.com rated the Celica as one of the best cars to purchase for fuel economy.

Exports of the Celica ceased in July 2005 for North American and Australian markets. However, until mid-May, customers could still order one, although it was advised they took action before that time ended.

The last Celica was rolled off production line on 21 April 2006, after 36 years and seven generations. In its last year of production, the Celica was only officially sold in Japan and Europe.

=== North America ===
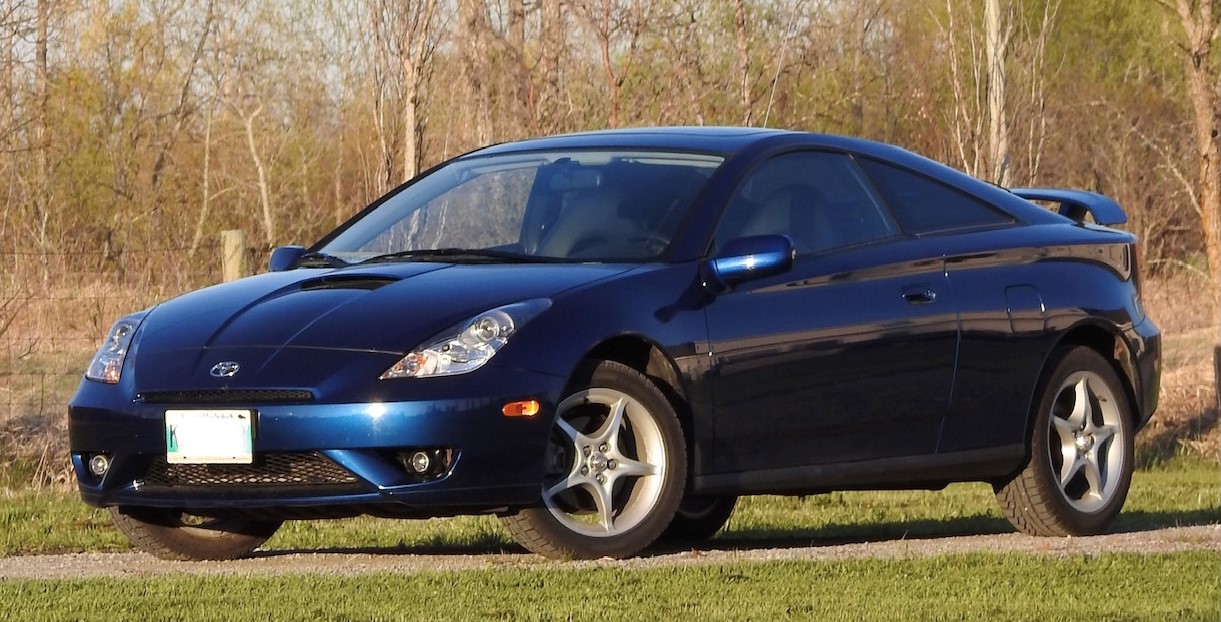
Facelift Toyota Celica GT-S (ZZT231, Canada)

In the US and Canada, two models were offered; the base model GT and the higher performance GT-S. All models were Liftback only. All models featured dual front airbags, daytime running lights (DRL) with auto-on parking and headlights, and 4 cup holders: two in the front and two in the rear. Power door lock and power window switches were mounted on the center console to reduce costs. Rear seats were contoured for only 2 passengers and can split down 50/50 to increase cargo capacity. Two-speed front wipers had variable intermittent adjustment. The rear wiper had a single speed and fixed intermittent speed. Windshield and rear window washers were also standard. In the interest of reducing weight, the optional sunroof was made of polymer plastics instead of glass. In later models, the sunroof was made of glass. Other options include ABS, rear spoiler, fog lights (for GT, standard on GT-S), 6-disc CD changer, leather seat surfaces, side-impact airbags, floor mats, vehicle intrusion protection (VIP) alarms with door lock/unlock feature, cargo net, cold area package (heavy-duty battery and starter motor) and liftback cargo cover.

The GT was powered by the 1ZZ-FE engine rated at 140 bhp (104 kW; 142 PS) at 6,400 rpm and 125 lb⋅ft (169 N⋅m) of torque at 4,200 rpm. It uses Toyota's VVT-i (Variable Valve Timing with intelligence) system which modulated the intake cam phase angle to increase torque and horsepower throughout the rev range. This is a similar engine used on the Matrix, Corolla, and MR2 Spyder. Transmission choices comprised a 5-speed manual or 4-speed automatic. The GT has standard front disc brakes and rear drum brakes, 195/60/15 tires with standard wheel covers or optional alloy wheels.

The GT-S was powered by the 2ZZ-GE engine rated at 180 bhp (134 kW; 182 PS) at 7,600 rpm and 133 lb⋅ft (180 N⋅m) torque at 6,800 rpm. The engine featured Toyota's VVTL-i (Variable Valve Timing and Lift control with intelligence). A second stage valve lift control for intake was added to the variable intake cam phase timing. Variants of this engine were offered in the Matrix XRS, Corolla XRS and the Lotus Elise (with a Lotus ECU which added 10 bhp). Buyers had the option of a four-speed automatic with shift buttons on the steering wheel, or a six-speed manual. The base tire size was 205/55/15 but the optional size offered was 205/50/16. All GT-S models had four-wheel disc brakes and metal pedals. Manual transmission shifters and all steering wheels were upgraded to leather-wrapped.

New in 2001, for the 2002 model year, was the “Action Package” which offered an aggressively styled front bumper with wider grille, rocker panels, rear bumper diffuser, and higher rear spoiler – this package could also be retrofitted to earlier 7th generation models. Liftback cargo covers were standard along with fog lights for models without the "Action Package". Initially this body kits option was the same as JDM Mechanical Sports. The front bumper fairing interfered with the mounting location for the standard factory fog lights, requiring them to be adjusted or removed when this option was added. TRD USA offered performance upgrades such as lowering springs, dampers, anti-sway bars, disc brake pads, air filters, exhaust, short-shift kits (manual transmissions), and body kits. The exhaust offered an increase of 14 hp (10 kW), albeit mostly at higher rpm.

The Celica received a facelift for the 2003 model year with the restyled front bumper and rear combination lamps. The interior was mildly restyled, a power antenna replaced the fixed one. A new option was High Intensity Discharge (HID) headlamps. JBL Premium 3-in-1 ETR/Cassette/CD was standard on the GT-S, or optional for the GT. For the 2004 model year, all models were fitted with a cabin air filter. The Action Package body kit was restyled for the 2004 model year with a different front bumper, side and rear spoiler which no longer bore a similarity to the Mechanical Sports package offered in Japan.

==== Decline ====
In July 2004, Toyota announced the Celica (as well as the MR2) would be discontinued in the United States at the end of the 2005 model year due to a lack of sales. Celica sales hit 52,406 units in 2000, but dropped sharply to 14,856 in 2003. Just 8,710 Celicas were sold in 2004, and only 3,113 were sold in 2005. At that time, the sports coupe market in general had been rapidly shrinking in that region, in part due to the 1997 Asian financial crisis, the effects of the collapse of the Japanese asset price bubble (also known in Japan as the "bubble economy" or the Lost Decades), and the rising yen that pushed up prices in overseas markets. Sales of all sports coupes started to decline in recent years, and customers began to choose other vehicles such as SUVs. The 2005 model year was the last year of the Celica in the US.

=== Japan ===
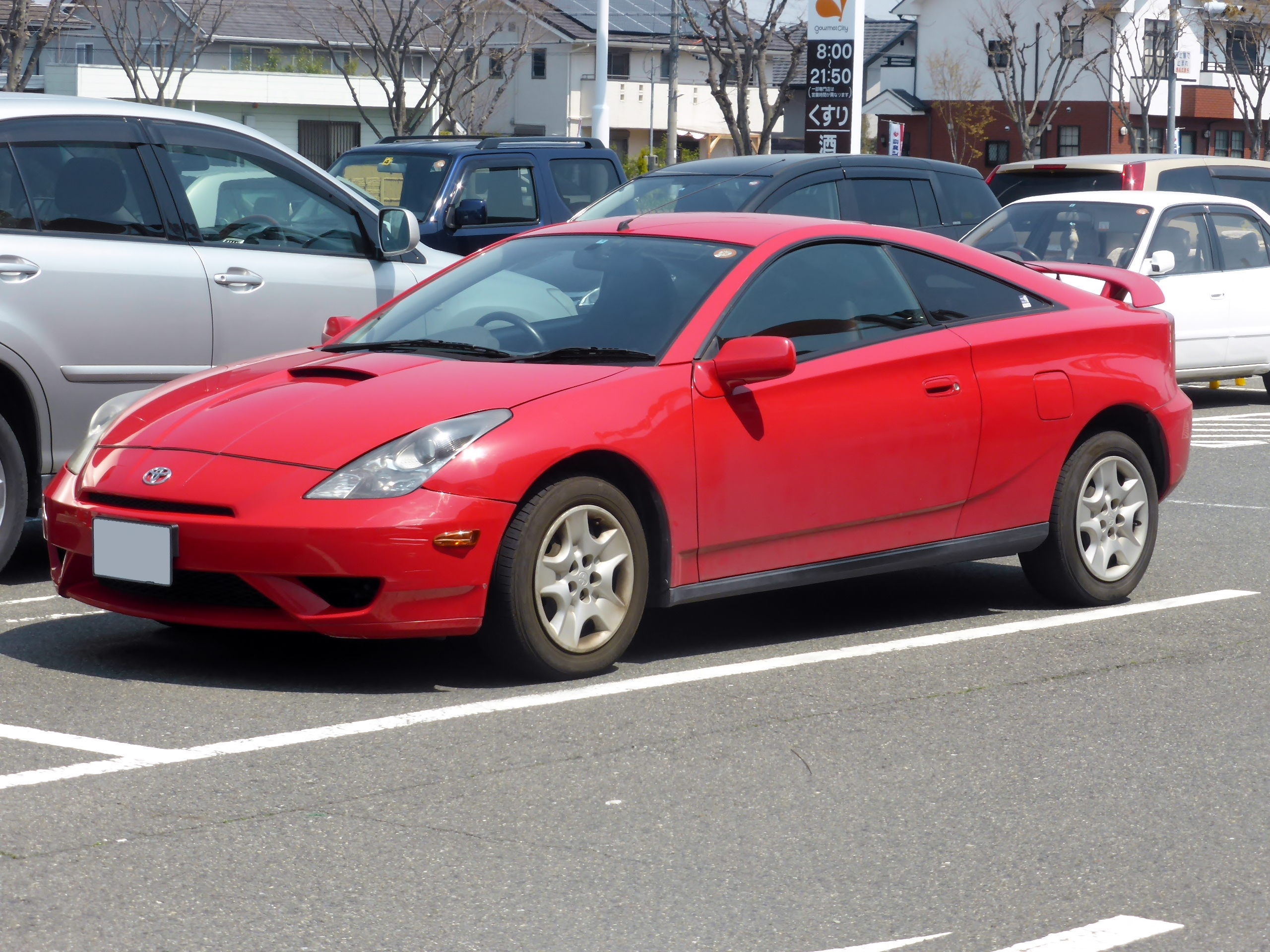
The facelift model Toyota Celica SS-I (ZZT230, Japan)

The Japanese models continued to carry SS-I and SS-II trim levels. The SS-I is powered by the 1ZZ-FE engine while the SS-II is powered by the 2ZZ-GE engine. The SS-II also could be ordered with the Super Strut Package which included super strut suspension, rear strut bar, 16-inch alloys, metal pedals, and colored rocker panels. The SS-II had climate control AC with a digital display. Options included the choice of the Elegant Sports Version with a front lip spoiler, headlight covers, and smoked-transparent fuel lid, or the Mechanical Sports Version with a full body kit (sportier front bumper with bigger grille, hood spoiler, rear bumper spoiler, side contoured spoilers or rocker panels, over fenders, and higher trunk spoiler).

Toyota also released a limited-production version of the 7th generation called the TRD Sports M based on the SS-II. This version was rated at 200 PS (147 kW; 197 hp) and featured a reinforced unibody, Sports Interface meter combination with center white tachometer and 240 km/h speedometer, TRD body kits with raised hood scoop and slightly different rear spoiler, and revised suspension components. The Sports M was only sold exclusively in Japan.

In terms of performance, SS-II models equipped with the 2ZZ-GE engine are capable of accelerating from 0–100 km/h in approximately 6.5–7.0 seconds, depending on transmission type, vehicle condition, and testing method. The engine features Toyota's VVTL-i system (Variable Valve Timing and Lift intelligent), where the “lift” cam profile engages at high engine speeds, significantly increasing airflow and power output. The lift engagement typically occurs around 6,200–6,400 rpm, with the engine's rev limit set at approximately 8,200-8,500 rpm.

The Japanese market Celica was updated with minor changes in August 2002, noticeably with the restyled front bumper and rear combination lamps. The reduction of engine displacement reflected a drop off in sales to Japanese customers due to the annual road tax liability of previous generations.

7th Generation Models as of 2002
Chassis Code	Model(s)	Drivetrain	Engine	Power	Torque	Markets	Price (¥1000)
ZZT230	SS-I	FWD MT	1ZZ-FE	145 PS (107 kW; 143 hp) at 6,400 rpm	170 N⋅m (125 lb⋅ft) at 4,200 rpm	JPN	1730 (US$14,400)
ZZT231	SS-II	FWD MT	2ZZ-GE	190 PS (140 kW; 187 hp) at 7,600 rpm	180 N⋅m (133 lb⋅ft) at 6,800 rpm	JPN	2020 (US$16,800)
ZZT231	SS-II Super Strut Package	FWD MT	2ZZ-GE	190 PS (140 kW; 187 hp) at 7,600 rpm	180 N⋅m (133 lb⋅ft) at 6,800 rpm	JPN	2250 (US$18,700)
ZZT231	TRD M Sport	FWD MT	2ZZ-GE	203 PS (149 KW; 200 hp) at 7,600 rpm	188 N⋅m (139 lb⋅ft) at 6,800 rpm	JPN	2550 (US$23,600)

=== Europe ===
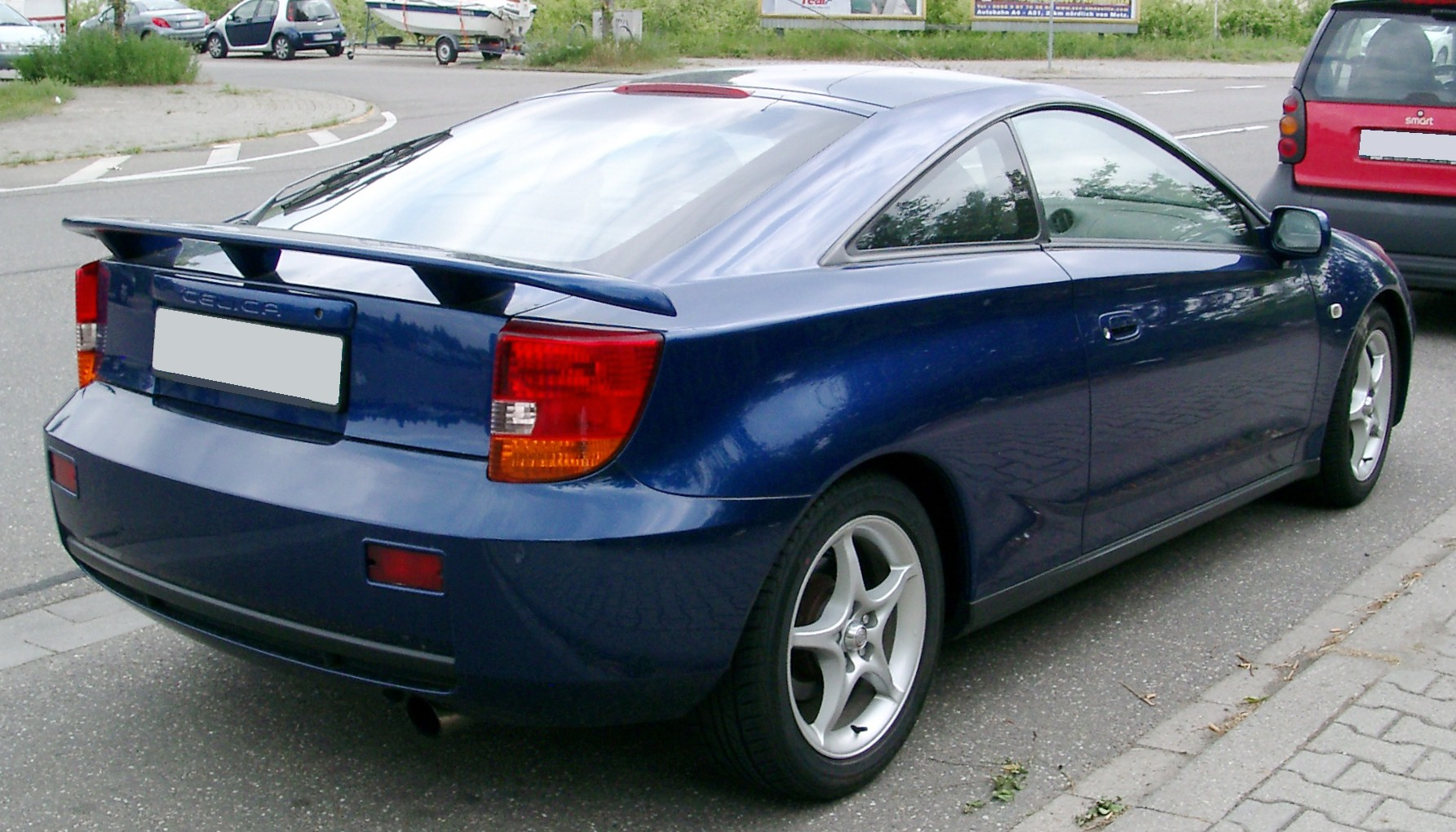
Toyota Celica 1.8 VVT-i (ZZT230, Germany)

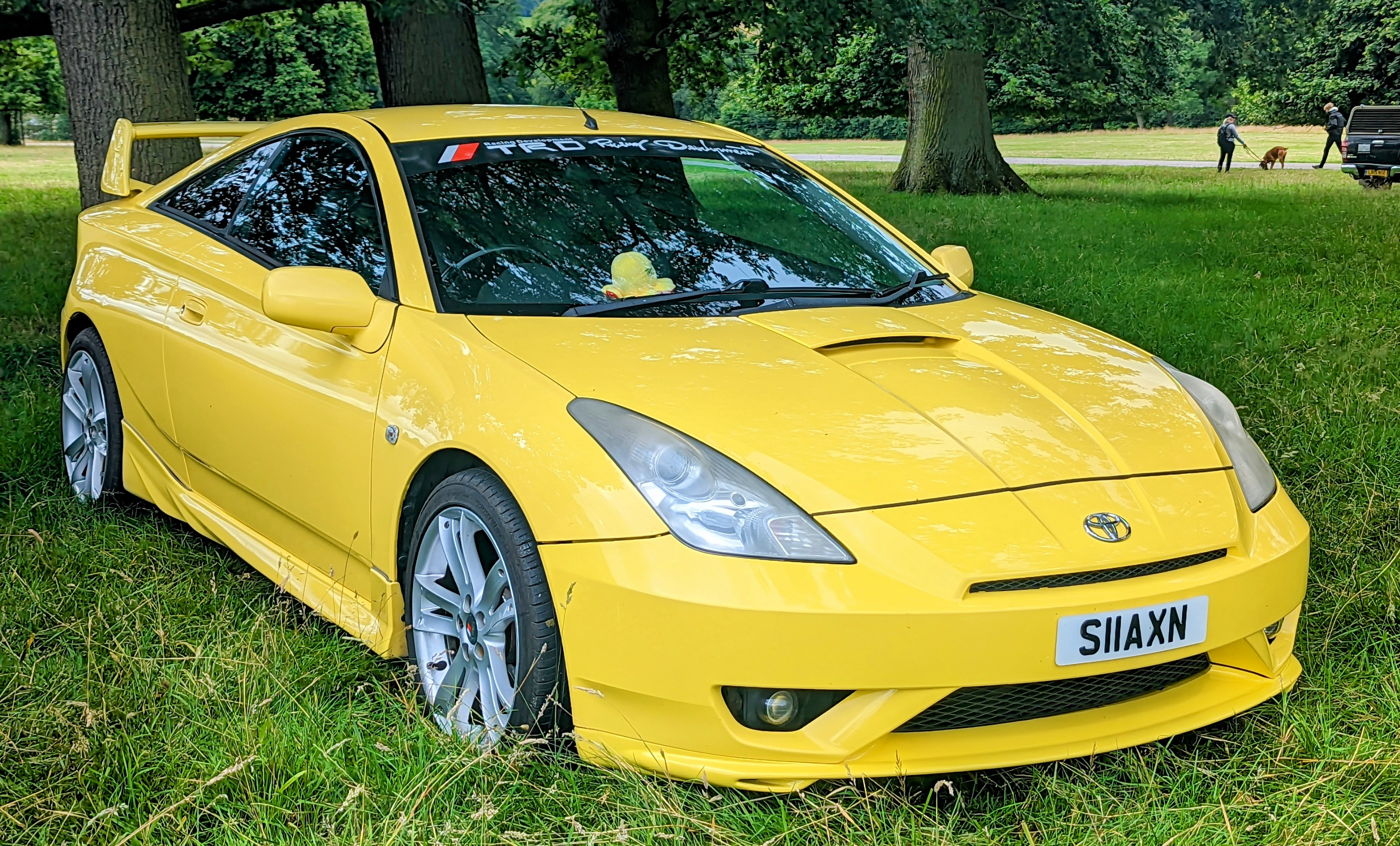
2005 Toyota Celica 1.8 VVTL-i GT (ZZT231, UK)

All the 7th generation Celica models for Europe have the 6-speed manual transmission and all-around disc brakes, and was just marketed as 1.8 VVT-i and 1.8 VVTL-i 190 or T-Sport, which are the GT and GT-S, respectively. The European Celica has rear fog lights on the rear bumper, and the trunk spoiler is slightly different from other regions' versions. The base 1.8 VVT-i also came with standard 16-inch alloy wheels which are the same as higher grade models in Japan, North America, and Asia Pacific. Premium and Style Packages were offered for the 1.8 VVT-i model. The 1.8 VVTL-i T-Sport received 17-inch 8-spoke alloy wheels, climate control air conditioning with digital display, and full leather interior.

The Celica GT debuted in the UK in 2005. It is unrelated to the GT trim offered in North America as it is powered by the more powerful 2ZZ-GE VVTL-i engine. The British GT is actually the T-Sport trim with more aggressive body kit, 17-inch double 5-spoke alloy wheels, 30 mm lowered suspension and part leather part Alcantara interior.

7th Generation Models as of 2006, pricing for UK market
Chassis Code	Model(s)	Drivetrain	Engine	Power	Torque	Markets	Price
ZZT230	1.8 VVTi	FWD MT	1ZZ-FE	142 PS (104 kW; 140 hp) at 6,400 rpm	173 N⋅m (128 lb⋅ft) at 4,200 rpm	UK, EUR	£16,670 (US$32,824)
ZZT231	1.8 VVTLi T Sport	FWD MT	2ZZ-GE	191 PS (140 kW; 188 hp) at 7,800 rpm	180.44 N⋅m (133.09 lb⋅ft) at 6,800 rpm	UK, EUR	£21,195 (US$41,711)
ZZT231	1.8 VVTLi GT	FWD MT	2ZZ-GE	191 PS (140 kW; 188 hp) at 7,800 rpm	180.44 N⋅m (133.09 lb⋅ft) at 6,800 rpm	UK	£22,640 (US$44,560)

=== Asia Pacific ===
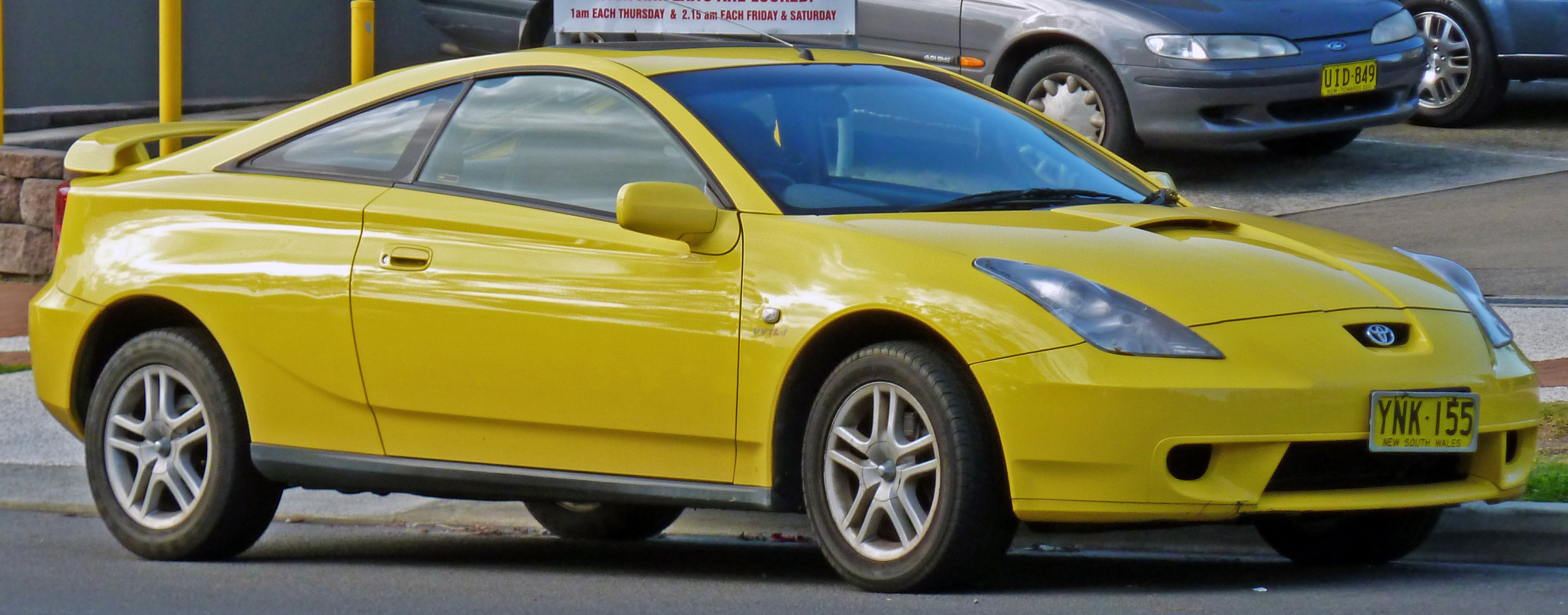
Pre-facelift Toyota Celica SX (ZZT231, Australia)

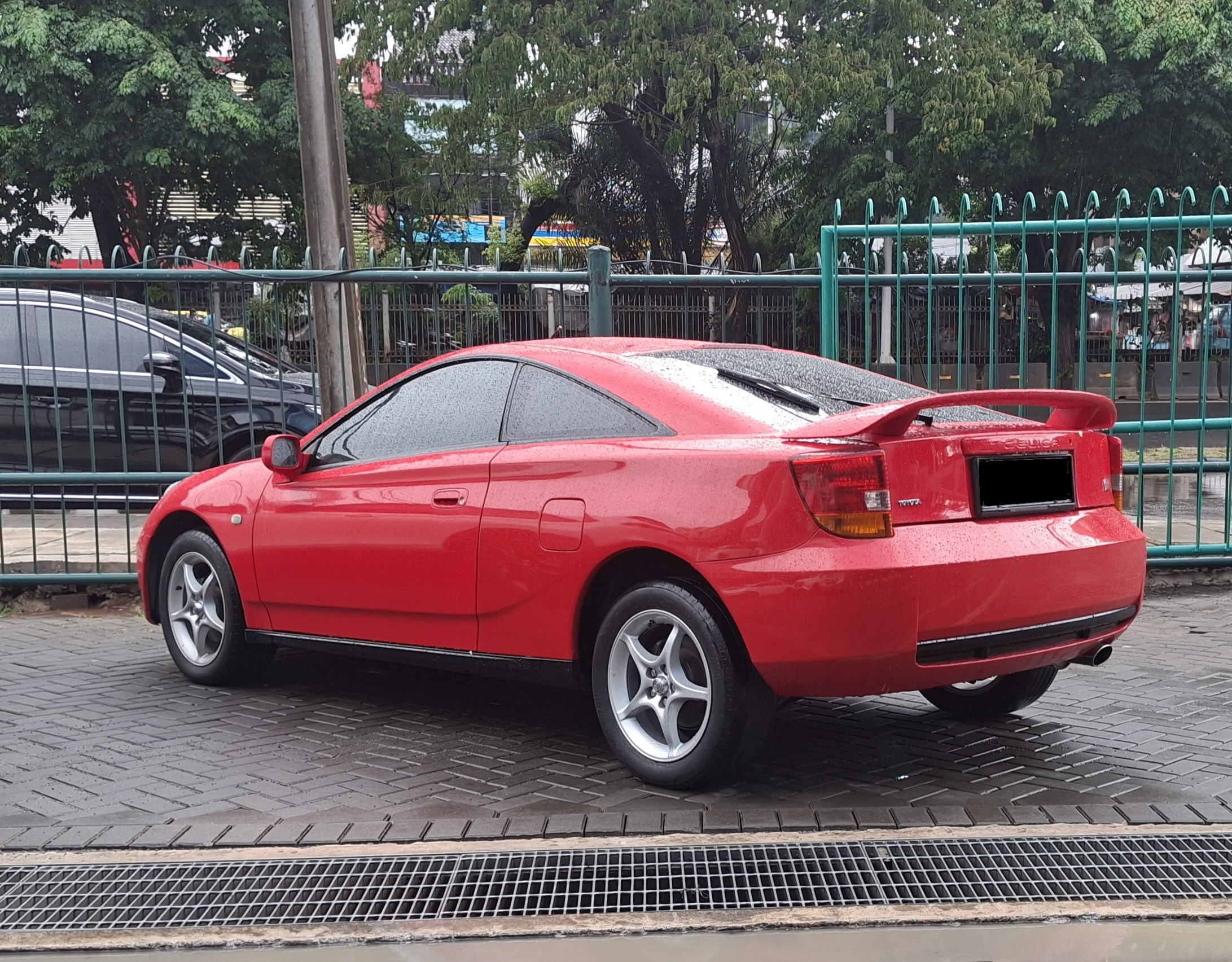
Pre-facelift Toyota Celica ZR (ZZT231, Australian-spec in Indonesia)

In Australia and New Zealand, the Celica was only offered with 2ZZ-GE engine in two trim levels, SX and ZR. The SX was fitted with 15-inch alloy wheels, CD player, electric windows and mirrors. The ZR has standard ABS, moonroof, SRS side and front airbags, fog lights, 16-inch alloy wheels, 6 stack in dash CD player with cassette, and aluminum pedals. All models have front and rear disc brakes. Optional extras was the 4-speed tiptronic Automatic, air conditioning, and metallic paint. TRD Sportivo body kits (which are the same as Mechanical Sports trim in Japan) were also available.

In Thailand and Hong Kong, the Celica was offered in a single trim level, similar to the Australian ZR with the 2ZZ-GE engine. Although not officially imported by the official Toyota dealerships, the Celica based on the Japanese market models was imported and sold through parallel import dealerships in some Asian markets such as Indonesia, Malaysia, and Singapore.

In Indonesia, for the pre-facelift models the Australian-spec SX and ZR trims, which are the same as those offered in Australia and New Zealand, were offered along with the Japanese SS-I and SS-II trims. After the facelift, most of the imported units were the Japanese SS-II trim models.

== Nameplate revival ==
In May 2023, Toyota President Koji Sato stated his desire to reintroduce the Celica brand. In November 2024, Toyota confirmed rumours that a new Celica model was being developed with a market introduction happening in 2026 or 2027.

== Safety ==
=== Australia ===
In Australia, 1981–1999 Toyota Celicas were all assessed in the Used Car Safety Ratings 2006 as providing "average" protection for their occupants in the event of a crash.

=== United States ===
A driver's side SRS airbag is standard in all US models from 1990. Dual SRS Airbags are standard from 1994. Seat-mounted side airbags are optional from 2000. The NHTSA NCAP rating for the 2005 model year is 4 stars for the Driver Front, 4 stars for the Passenger Front, and 3 stars for the Front side.

== Motorsports ==
=== Rallying ===
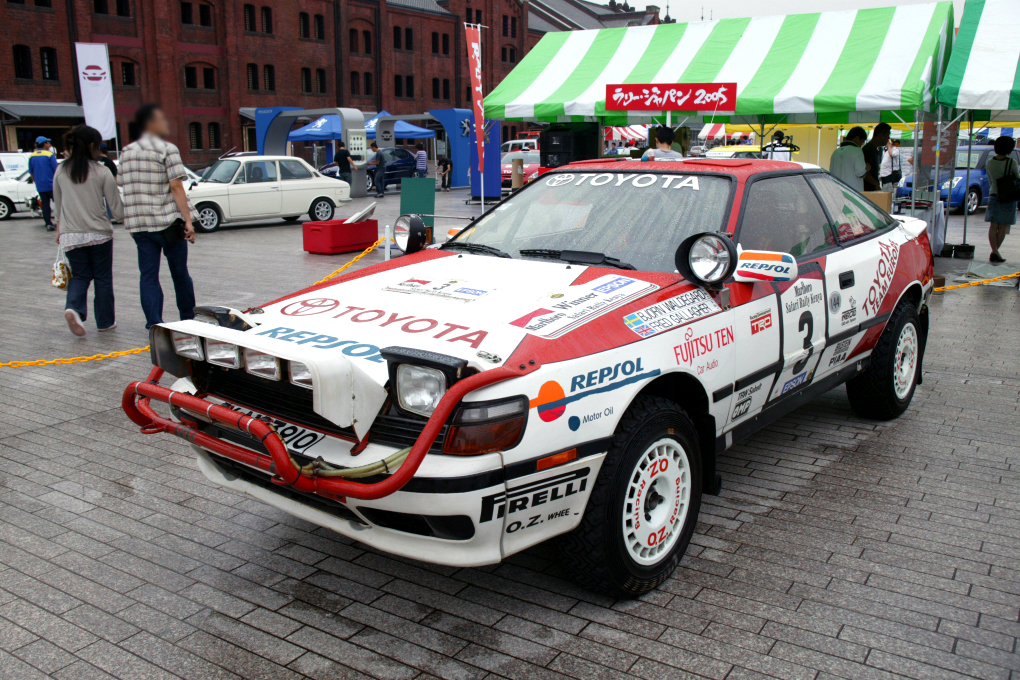
Toyota Celica GT-Four (ST165) Group A rally car, 1990 Safari Rally winner driven by Björn Waldegård.

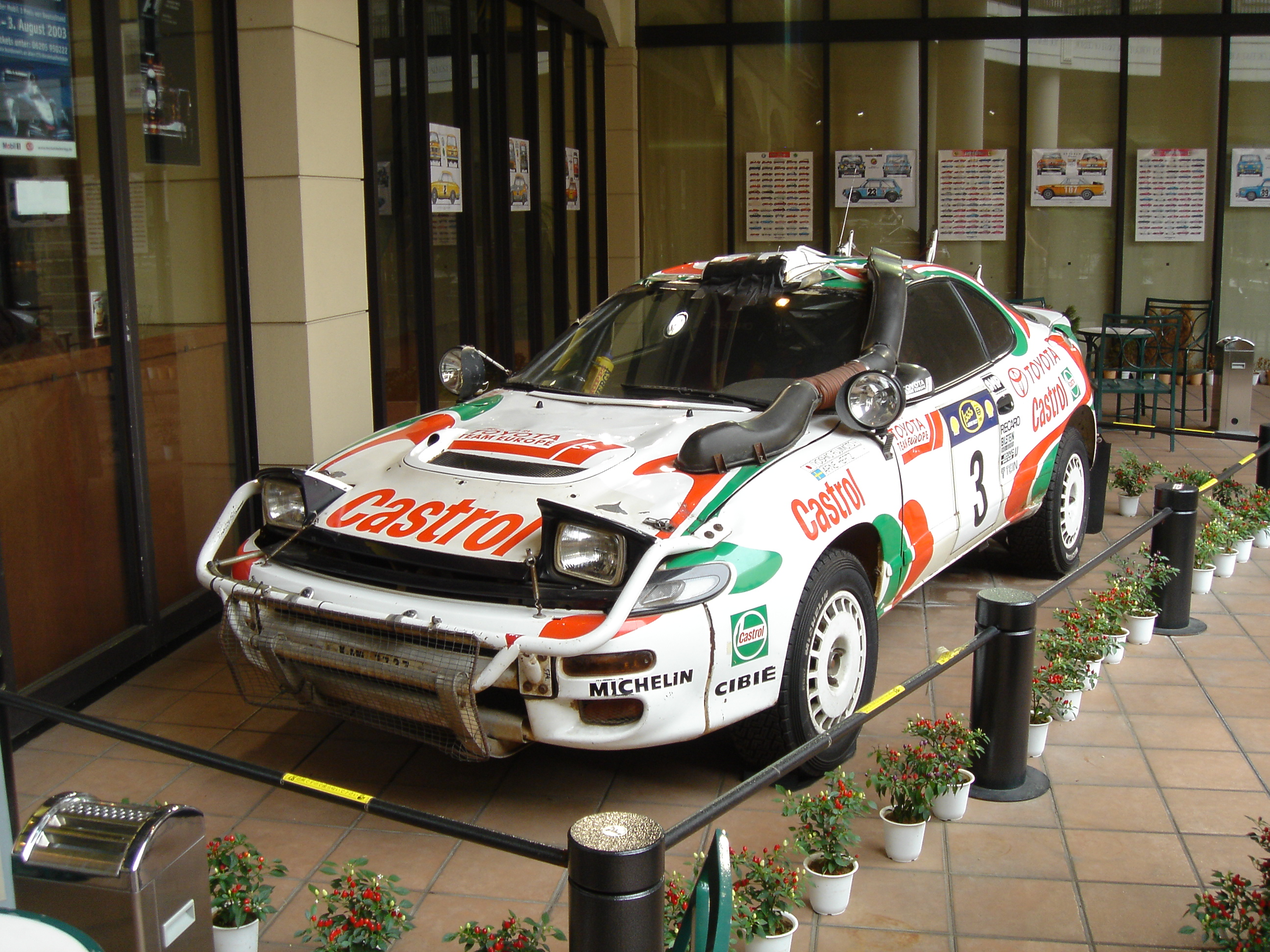
TTE's Celica GT-Four (ST185) Group A rally car, 1995 Safari Rally winner driven by Yoshio Fujimoto.

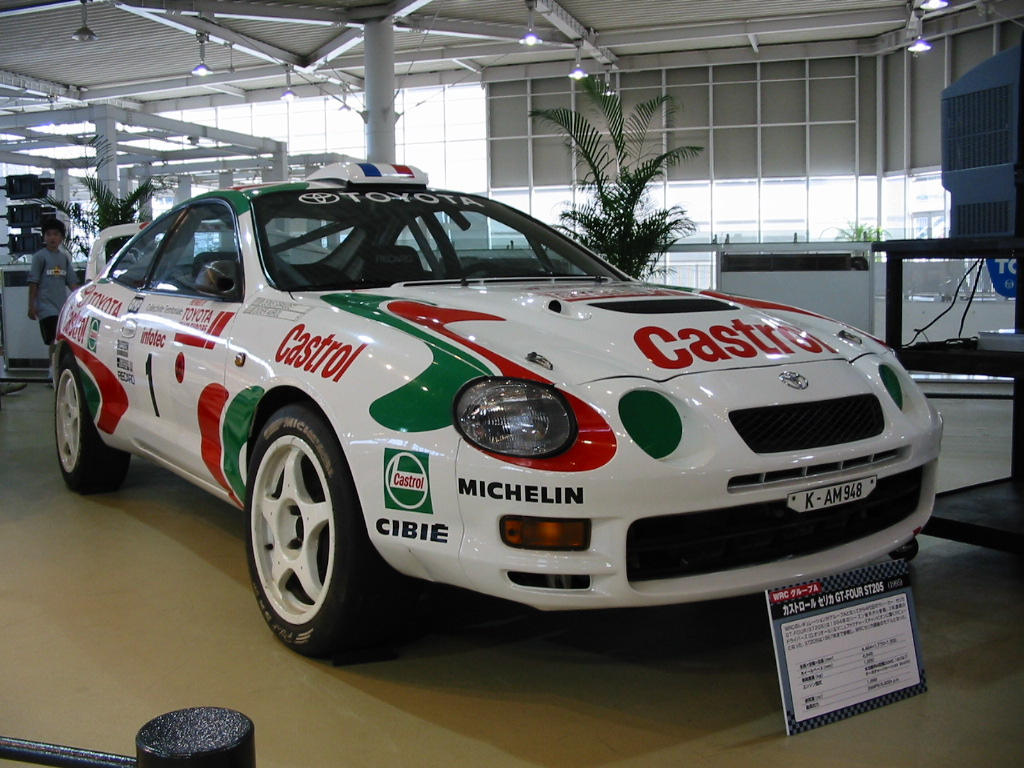
Toyota Celica GT-Four (ST205) 1995 Tour de Corse winner driven by Didier Auriol.

In motorsports, the Celica is known for its rallying prowess. The first World Rally Championship (WRC) event for the Celica was 1972 RAC Rally when Ove Andersson drove the 1600 GTV (TA22) into the ninth place. The first victory came in the 1982 Rally of New Zealand with Björn Waldegård in a 2000GT (RA63). From 1983 to 1986, the Group B Celica Twincam Turbo (TA64) won all six WRC events in Africa they entered.

After the demise of Group B, the Celica GT-Four competed in Group A Rally racing from 1988 to 1997. The car won two manufacturer's titles and four driver's titles. Carlos Sainz was its most successful driver, winning WRC titles with the ST165 in 1990 and the ST185 in 1992. The ST185 also won the 1993 and 1994 titles with Juha Kankkunen and Didier Auriol, respectively. The ST185's fourth consecutive Safari Rally victory came in 1995, which was also Toyota's 8th victory in this event. The ST205 became a center of controversy when the works Toyota Team Europe was banned for 12 months from the WRC because of use of an illegal turbo air restrictor. When TTE returned to the WRC, TTE switched to the shorter Corolla based on the European E110 3-door liftback and the new World Rally Car regulations, although the ST205 continued to be used by some regional Toyota and private teams.

=== Pikes Peak ===
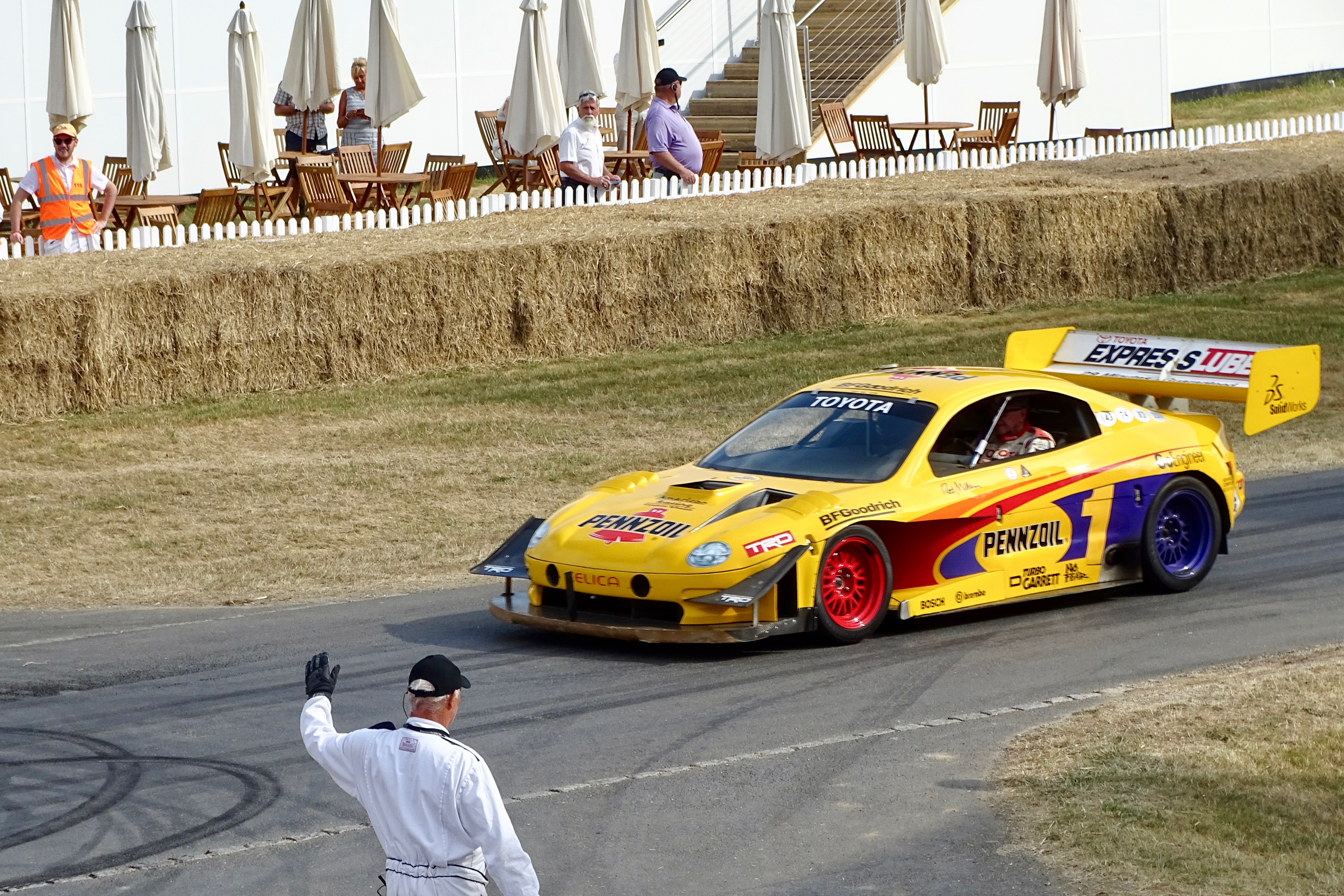
Pikes Peak Toyota Celica at 2018 Goodwood Festival of Speed

Toyota Motor Sales, USA and Rod Millen Motorsports (now MillenWorks) built a Toyota Celica silhouette race car specially for the Pikes Peak. It was powered by a modified 3S-GTE engine. Between 1994 and 1997, Rod Millen won the Pikes Peak International Hill Climb three times using this Celica, setting a record time which stood for more than 10 years.

=== Circuit racing ===
The first-generation liftback (known as Celica LB Turbo) was used to compete in the DRM between 1977 and 1978, the car was capable of producing 560 hp (418 kW). The car was entered by Schnitzer via Toyota Deutschland and was driven by Harald Ertl and Rolf Stommelen for the following season. The car had a limited success scoring only 4th and 8th and was plagued with various problems throughout the two seasons before it was sold to TOM'S in Japan which under company founder, Nobuhide Tachi, it had a successful career. Tachi also had a successful career with the second-generation version. Despite its limited success in the series, the DRM liftback was immortalized by Tamiya as a 1/12 radio controlled car and a 1/24 static model.

An almost identical Celica GT Coupe Turbo was built in Denmark in 1978–1979 and raced by Peter Hansen in the Danish championship. He came second in 1979 before winning the Danish Championship in 1980. The car had the same 2,148 cc engine block (18R) and the same Mahle forged pistons as the German DRM car but with an 8-valve cylinder head, producing 300 kW (400 hp). The Danish-built engine with K-jetronic fuel injection proved more reliable than the mechanically fuel injected Schnitzer built engine. Both engines were equipped with KKK turbochargers.

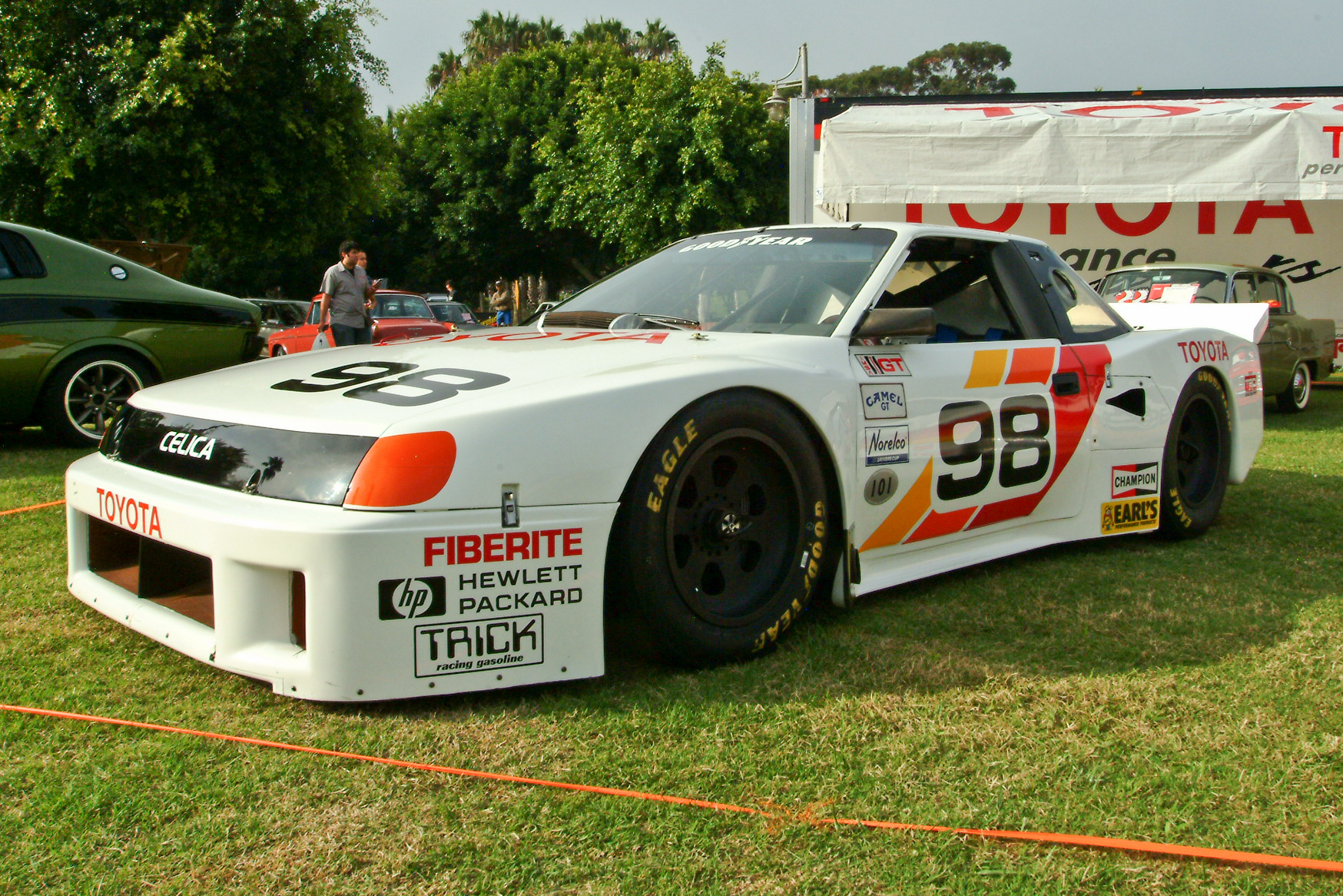
Toyota Celica Turbo IMSA GTO front

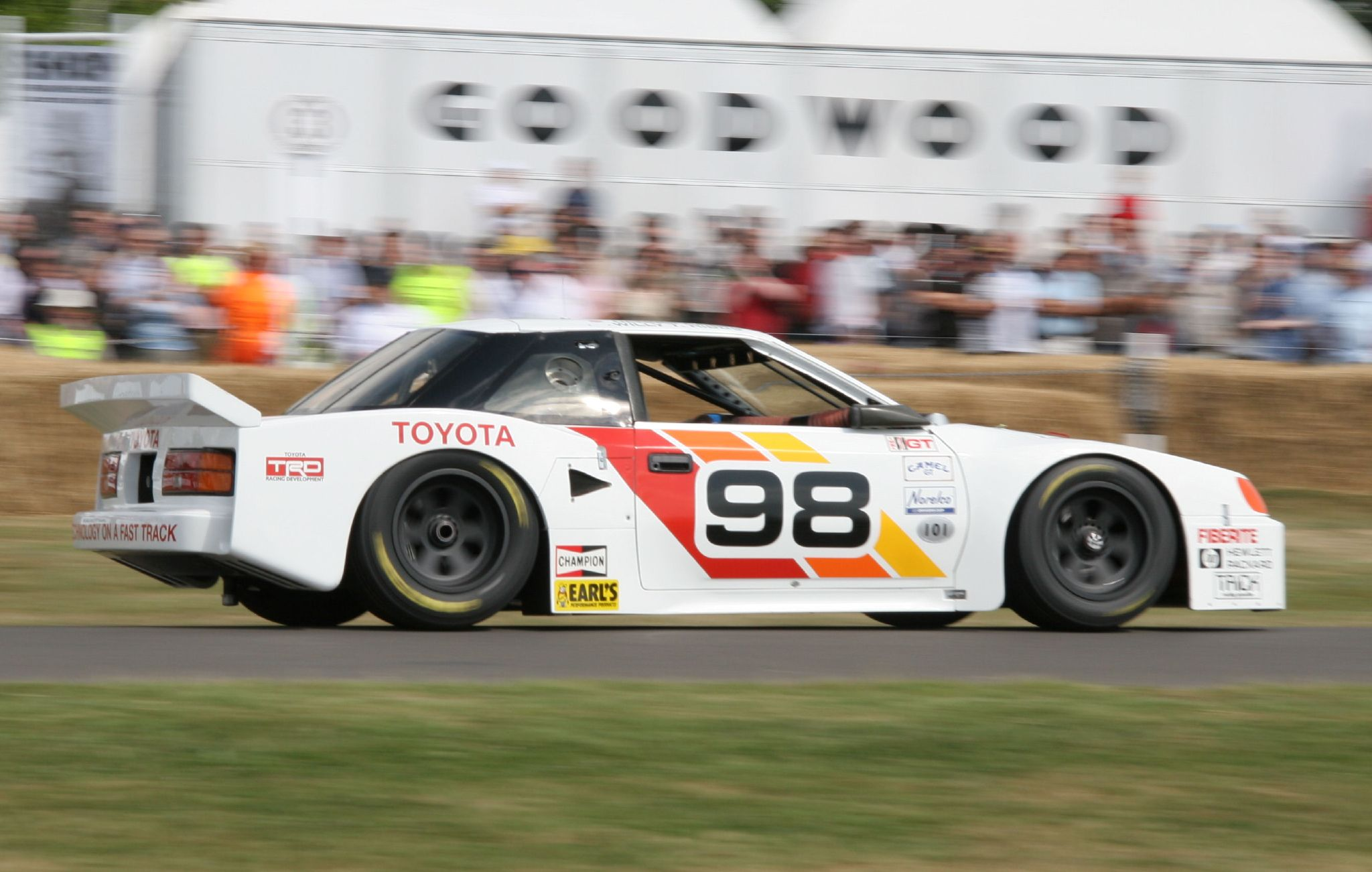
Toyota Celica Turbo IMSA GTO rear

In circuit racing, the Celica was raced by Dan Gurney's All American Racers team with factory backing in the IMSA GTU and GTO classes from 1983 to 1988. The team captured many class wins and the GTO Championship in 1987. Slightly modified versions of stock Celicas were also used as the spec car in the Toyota Pro/Celebrity Race, always held during the weekend of the Long Beach Grand Prix or (from 1976 to 1983) the United States Grand Prix West until 2005.

The Celica (usually the first through third-generation rear-wheel drive models powered by R series engines) was sometimes raced privately in stock car racing, usually in four-cylinder classes at the grassroots level. A less stock version of the Celica with factory backing and development was campaigned successfully by several drivers in the Goody's Dash Series. These Celicas started racing in 2000 and had 6th or 7th generation bodies but a steel tube-frame race chassis and a production-based V6 engine that was not available in the street Celica. Robert Huffman won the 2003 Dash Series Championship driving one of these Celicas, leading to Toyota's entry in the NASCAR Truck Series the following year and then the NASCAR Cup Series and the then-NASCAR Busch Series in 2007. Osborne Motorsport won their class in the 2003 Bathurst 24 Hour race.

The seventh-generation Celicas were also successfully campaigned in the NHRA Sport Compact Drag Racing series during the early 2000s. Toyotas run in the NHRA Funny Car class also used Celica bodies, although besides the body, these cars do not share any resemblance to their street counterparts.

In Japan, the Team Racing Project Bandoh created a special rear wheel drive variant of the seventh-generation Celica using a 3S-GTE engine, having previously ran a front wheel drive sixth generation model. It was entered into GT300 class of the Japanese Grand Touring Championship (and later Super GT) until 2008, when they switched their car to a Lexus IS350 in race 3 that season.

== Timeline ==
1970: Celica ET, LT, ST, GT introduced.
1972: Celica GTV introduced. The first World Rally Championship (WRC) in RAC Rally.
1973: Celica introduced in liftback body style in Japan (The RA25 and TA27 were released for sale in April 1973 in Japan).
1976: Celica Liftback began for export market. Celica won Motor Trend Import Car of the Year.
1977: The 1-millionth Celica produced in June 1977.
1978: Second-generation Celica introduced; was awarded Motor Trend Import Car of the Year.
1979: (Griffith produced) Sunchaser semi-convertible introduced, based on the 2nd generation notchback coupe.
1979 - (Griffith produced) TX22 Sport Targa Top (Sunchaser style) based on the 2nd generation Liftback.
1980 - (Griffith produced) LEGATO Targa Top (Sunchaser style) based on the 1st generation Celica Supra.
1981: Sunchaser, TX22 Sport and LEGATO production ended.
1982: Third generation introduced.
1983: Toyota Team Europe (TTE) introduced the Celica Twincam Turbo (TA64) Group B rally car.
1984: Celica GT-S among Consumer's Digest "Best Buys" and Car and Driver Ten Best Cars. 1st year for the convertible (based on the RA65 GT-S) from ASC 250 made.
1985: Fourth-generation; front-wheel drive introduced in August 1985. 4,248 units of 3rd generation RA65 GT-S convertible produced this year.
1986: All-wheel drive GT-Four introduced in October 1986.
1987: New-generation convertible / cabriolet (based on the ST162) introduced.
1988: All-Trac Turbo / GT-Four model for export.
1990: Fifth generation introduced. Spanish driver Carlos Sainz, driving ST165 GT-Four became World Rally Champion (WRC).
1991: New generation convertible / cabriolet (based on the ST182, ST183, and ST184) introduced.
1992: Carlos Sainz won his second WRC title with ST185 GT-Four
1993: Last year of the GT-S, All-Trac Turbo. Juha Kankkunen won his 4th WRC title, driving ST185 GT-Four.
1994: Sixth generation introduced. Didier Auriol won WRC title with ST185 GT-Four.
1995: New generation convertible / cabriolet (based on the ST202 & ST204) produced.
1997: "Most Reliable Used Vehicles, MYs '89–'95" J.D. Power & Associates.
1998: Last year for the notchback coupe body style.
2000: Seventh-generation Celica introduced.
2001: US Consumer Reports rates Celica GT-S "Best Sports Coupe" "Most Wanted Sport Coupe Under $30,000" Edmunds.com
2002: US Consumer Reports "Most Reliable Sporty Car"; Edmunds.com "Most Wanted Sport Coupe—Under $30,000"
2005: Final year for Celica in North America and Australia. Still in production in Japan.
2006: Toyota ended the production of the 7th-generation Celica in Japan and sales in Europe.

== Sales ==
Toyota Celica sales (1985–2006)
Model	Calendar year	US	Europe
T160	1985	80,480	
T160	1986	106,731	
T160	1987	79,333	
T160	1988	66,331	
T160	1989	61,936	
T160	Total	394,811	
T180	1990	78,521	
T180	1991	60,187	
T180	1992	41,750	
T180	1993	29,237	
T180	Total	209,695	
T200	1994	34,597	
T200	1995	21,260	
T200	1996	14,266	
T200	1997	9,895	7,766
T200	1998	4,290	6,420
T200	1999	16,418	6,996
T200	Total	100,726	21,182
T230	2000	52,406	17,996
T230	2001	35,720	13,460
T230	2002	22,893	9,446
T230	2003	14,856	8,540
T230	2004	8,710	6,590
T230	2005	3,113	4,536
T230	2006	9	1,684
T230	Total	137,707	62,252

Note : The above figures are not representing generations. For example, sales in the 1989 calendar year included the 1989 model year 4th generation and the 1990 model year 5th generation models which was launched in late 1989.

== See also ==
- List of Toyota vehicles
