= 1983 All Japan Endurance Championship =

Seasons
- ← none 1984 →

The 1983 All Japan Endurance Championship was the inaugural season of the All Japan Sports Prototype Championship. The series champion was the #1 Trust Racing Team Porsche 956 driven by Australian Vern Schuppan, who earlier in the year had won the 1983 24 Hours of Le Mans.

== Entry list ==
=== C ===
- For the WEC-Japan event, JSPC teams used different car numbers to avoid conflicts with the car numbers of the entrants of the World Sportscar Championship; each car's WEC-Japan race number is displayed in tooltips.

Team	Make	Car	Engine	No.	Drivers	Tyre	Rounds
Trust Racing Team	Porsche	Porsche 956B	Porsche 935/79 2.6 L Twin Turbo F6	1	(Australia) Vern Schuppan	D	All
Trust Racing Team	Porsche	Porsche 956B	Porsche 935/79 2.6 L Twin Turbo F6	1	(Japan) Naohiro Fujita	D	All
Alpha Cubic Racing Team	MCS	MCS Guppy	BMW M12/7 2.0 L I4	7	(Japan) Chiyomi Totani	B	All
Alpha Cubic Racing Team	MCS	MCS Guppy	BMW M12/7 2.0 L I4	7	(Japan) Taku Akaike	B	All
Hasemi Motorsport	Nissan	Nissan Skyline Turbo C	Nissan LZ20B 2.1 L Turbo I4	11	(Japan) Masahiro Hasemi	D	2–3
Hasemi Motorsport	Nissan	Nissan Skyline Turbo C	Nissan LZ20B 2.1 L Turbo I4	11	(Japan) Kenji Tohira	D	2–3
Mazdaspeed	Mazda	Mazda 717C	Mazda RE13B 1.3 L Twin Turbo 2-rotor	16	(Japan) Yojiro Terada	D	3
Mazdaspeed	Mazda	Mazda 717C	Mazda RE13B 1.3 L Twin Turbo 2-rotor	16	(Japan) Takashi Yorino	D	3
Mazdaspeed	Mazda	Mazda 717C	Mazda RE13B 1.3 L Twin Turbo 2-rotor	16	(Belgium) Pierre Dieudonné	D	3
TOM'S	Toyota	Toyota TOM'S Celica C	Toyota 3T-G 2.0 L I4	17	(Japan) Keiji Matsumoto	B	1
TOM'S	Toyota	Toyota TOM'S Celica C	Toyota 3T-G 2.0 L I4	17	(Japan) Masanori Sekiya	B	1
TOM'S	Toyota	Toyota TOM'S Celica C	Toyota 3T-G 2.0 L I4	17	(Japan) Kaoru Hoshino	B	1
TOM'S	Toyota	TOM'S 83C	Toyota 4T-G 2.1 L Twin Turbo I4	17	(Japan) Keiji Matsumoto	B	2–3
TOM'S	Toyota	TOM'S 83C	Toyota 4T-G 2.1 L Twin Turbo I4	17	(Japan) Masanori Sekiya	B	2–3
TOM'S	Toyota	TOM'S 83C	Toyota 4T-G 2.1 L Twin Turbo I4	17	(Japan) Kaoru Hoshino	B	2–3
Central 20 Racing Team	Nissan	Nissan Fairlady Z Turbo C	Nissan LZ20B 2.1 L Twin Turbo I4	20	(Japan) Haruhito Yanagida	D	3
Central 20 Racing Team	Nissan	Nissan Fairlady Z Turbo C	Nissan LZ20B 2.1 L Twin Turbo I4	20	(Japan) Takao Wada	D	3
Hoshino Racing	Nissan	Nissan Silvia Turbo C	Nissan LZ20B 2.1 L Turbo I4	23	(Japan) Kazuyoshi Hoshino	B	2–3
Hoshino Racing	Nissan	Nissan Silvia Turbo C	Nissan LZ20B 2.1 L Turbo I4	23	(Japan) Akira Hagiwara	B	2–3
Team Ikuzawa	Toyota	Toyota TOM'S Celica C	Toyota 3T-G 2.0 L I4	37	(United Kingdom) Geoff Lees	D	3
Team Ikuzawa	Toyota	Toyota TOM'S Celica C	Toyota 3T-G 2.0 L I4	37	(Republic of Ireland) Derek Daly	D	3
Team Ikuzawa	Toyota	Toyota TOM'S Celica C	Toyota 3T-G 2.0 L I4	37	(Japan) Toshio Suzuki	D	3
Auto Beaurex Motorsport	Lotec	Lotec M1C	BMW M88 3.5 L I6	65	(Japan) Naoki Nagasaka	Y	3
Auto Beaurex Motorsport	Lotec	Lotec M1C	BMW M88 3.5 L I6	65	(Germany) Kurt Lotterschmid	Y	3
Auto Beaurex Motorsport	Lotec	Lotec M1C	BMW M88 3.5 L I6	65	(Japan) Keiichi Suzuki	Y	3
Autobacs Dome Motorsport	Dome	Dome RC83	Ford DFL 4.0 L V8	77	(Sweden) Eje Elgh	D	2–3
Autobacs Dome Motorsport	Dome	Dome RC83	Ford DFL 4.0 L V8	77	(United Kingdom) Tiff Needell	D	2–3
Misaki Speed	MCS	MCS Guppy	Toyota 18R-G 2.2 L Turbo I4 (Rd. 2); Toyota 4T-GT 2.1 L Turbo I4 (Rd. 3)	81	(Japan) Kiyoshi Misaki	D	2–3
Misaki Speed	MCS	MCS Guppy	Toyota 18R-G 2.2 L Turbo I4 (Rd. 2); Toyota 4T-GT 2.1 L Turbo I4 (Rd. 3)	81	(Japan) Masakazu Nakamura	D	2–3
Panasport Japan	Panasport	Panasport C	BMW M12/7 2.0 L I4	88	(Japan) Aguri Suzuki	D	3
Panasport Japan	Panasport	Panasport C	BMW M12/7 2.0 L I4	88	(Japan) Toshio Motohashi	D	3

=== B ===
Team	Make	Car	Engine	No.	Drivers	Tyre	Rounds
Katayama Racing	Mazda	Mazda RX-7 254	Mazda RE13B 1.3 L 2-rotor	2	(Japan) Yoshimi Katayama	D	2
Katayama Racing	Mazda	Mazda RX-7 254	Mazda RE13B 1.3 L 2-rotor	2	(Japan) Tsunehisa Asai	D	2
Alpha Cubic Racing Team	Mazda	Mazda RX-7 825	Mazda RE13B 1.3 L 2-rotor	3	(Japan) Chiyomi Totani	D	1
Alpha Cubic Racing Team	Mazda	Mazda RX-7 825	Mazda RE13B 1.3 L 2-rotor	3	(Japan) Taku Akaike	D	1
MO Racing	Mazda	Mazda RX-7 253	Mazda RE13B 1.3 L 2-rotor	5	(Japan) Hiroyuki Ono	D	1
MO Racing	Mazda	Mazda RX-7 253	Mazda RE13B 1.3 L 2-rotor	5	(Japan) Kazuo Mogi	D	1
Capris Enterprise	Mazda	Mazda RX-7 253	Mazda RE13B 1.3 L 2-rotor	6	(Japan) Kazuyoshi Sakamoto	D	1–2
Capris Enterprise	Mazda	Mazda RX-7 253	Mazda RE13B 1.3 L 2-rotor	6	(Japan) Kenji Iya	D	1–2
Yours Sports	Mazda	Mazda RX-7 254	Mazda RE13B 1.3 L 2-rotor	7	(Japan) Takashi Yorino	B	1–2
Yours Sports	Mazda	Mazda RX-7 254	Mazda RE13B 1.3 L 2-rotor	7	(Japan) Chikage Oguchi	B	1–2
Yours Sports	Mazda	Mazda RX-7 253	Mazda RE13B 1.3 L 2-rotor	8	(Japan) Takashi Tosa	B	1–2
Yours Sports	Mazda	Mazda RX-7 253	Mazda RE13B 1.3 L 2-rotor	8	(Japan) Hideki Okada	B	1–2
TRS Itabashi	Mazda	Mazda RX-7 253	Mazda RE13B 1.3 L 2-rotor	10	(Japan) Tsutomu Itabashi	B	2
TRS Itabashi	Mazda	Mazda RX-7 253	Mazda RE13B 1.3 L 2-rotor	10	(Japan) Tetsuji Tabata	B	2
TRS Itabashi	Mazda	Mazda RX-7 253	Mazda RE13B 1.3 L 2-rotor	10	(Japan) Masahiro Kimoto	B	2
Malibu Motor Sports Club	Mazda	Mazda RX-7 253	Mazda RE13B 1.3 L 2-rotor	12	(Japan) Hironobu Tatsumi	B	2
Malibu Motor Sports Club	Mazda	Mazda RX-7 253	Mazda RE13B 1.3 L 2-rotor	12	(Japan) Yoshimasa Matsumoto	B	2
Malibu Motor Sports Club	Mazda	Mazda RX-7 253	Mazda RE13B 1.3 L 2-rotor	12	(Japan) Yoshiyuki Ogura	B	2
Orient Speed	Isuzu	Isuzu Piazza	Isuzu 4ZC1 2.0 L I4	14	(Japan) Akihiko Koto	D	1
Orient Speed	Isuzu	Isuzu Piazza	Isuzu 4ZC1 2.0 L I4	14	(Japan) Shuichi Ogata	D	1
Yoshiro Takaoka	Subaru	Subaru Leone	Subaru EA81 1.8 L F4	14	(Japan) Yoshiro Takaoka	B	2
Yoshiro Takaoka	Subaru	Subaru Leone	Subaru EA81 1.8 L F4	14	(Japan) Koichi Tahara	B	2
Yoshiro Takaoka	Subaru	Subaru Leone	Subaru EA81 1.8 L F4	14	(Japan) Akihiko Nakaya	B	2
Japan Sports Car Club	Mazda	Mazda RX-7 253	Mazda RE13B 1.3 L 2-rotor	17	(Japan) Yoshimasa Matsumoto	D	1
JACS Racing Team	Mazda	Mazda RX-7 253	Mazda RE13B 1.3 L 2-rotor	25	(Japan) Kozo Kamata	BF	2
JACS Racing Team	Mazda	Mazda RX-7 253	Mazda RE13B 1.3 L 2-rotor	25	(Japan) Tetsuya Ota	BF	2
Nagata Racing	Toyota	Toyota Corolla	Toyota 18R-G 2.0 L I4	27	(Japan) Tetsuhide Nagata	D	2
Nagata Racing	Toyota	Toyota Corolla	Toyota 18R-G 2.0 L I4	27	(Japan) Koichi Iwaki	D	2
Nagata Racing	Toyota	Toyota Corolla	Toyota 18R-G 2.0 L I4	27	(Japan) Makoto Nakamura	D	2
Akeno Car	Mazda	Mazda RX-7 253	Mazda RE13B 1.3 L 2-rotor	33	(Japan) Fumio Inagaki	D	1
Akeno Car	Mazda	Mazda RX-7 253	Mazda RE13B 1.3 L 2-rotor	33	(Japan) Masaaki Imai	D	1
Marukatsu Racing	Chevrolet	Chevrolet Corvette	Chevrolet LS6 7.4 L V8	93	(Japan) Tomohiko Tsutsumi	D	1
Marukatsu Racing	Chevrolet	Chevrolet Corvette	Chevrolet LS6 7.4 L V8	93	(Japan) Shuroku Sasaki	D	1
Tomei Jidosha	Nissan	Nissan 240RS	Nissan FJ24 2.4 L I4	102	(Japan) Eiji Shibuya	D	3
Tomei Jidosha	Nissan	Nissan 240RS	Nissan FJ24 2.4 L I4	102	(Japan) Fumio Aiba	D	3

=== A ===
Team	Make	Car	Engine	No.	Drivers	Tyre	Rounds
Horii Racing	West	West 83S	Subaru EA81 1.8 L F4	5	(Japan) Nobuyoshi Horii	D	2
Horii Racing	West	West 83S	Subaru EA81 1.8 L F4	5	(Japan) Hajime Kajiwara	D	2
Mariko Racing Team	West	West 83S	Subaru EA81 1.8 L F4	9	(Japan) Osamu Nakajima	B	2
Mariko Racing Team	West	West 83S	Subaru EA81 1.8 L F4	9	(Japan) Kazunori Kyutoku	B	2
Autobacs Racing Team	Toyota	Toyota Starlet	Toyota 4K-E 1.3 L I4	10	(United States) Ron Brown	D	1
Autobacs Racing Team	Toyota	Toyota Starlet	Toyota 4K-E 1.3 L I4	10	(Japan) Hideo Fukuyama	D	1
Cockpit Inazawa	Daihatsu	Daihatsu Consorte	Toyota 4K-E 1.3 L I4	11	(Japan) Shigehito Hirabayashi	D	1
Cockpit Inazawa	Daihatsu	Daihatsu Consorte	Toyota 4K-E 1.3 L I4	11	(Japan) Koji Sato	D	1
KSCC	Toyota	Toyota Starlet	Toyota 4K-E 1.3 L I4	12	(Japan) Taido Hashimoto	D	1
KSCC	Toyota	Toyota Starlet	Toyota 4K-E 1.3 L I4	12	(Japan) Masaharu Kinoshita	D	1
Koichi Nishikawa	Nissan	Nissan Sunny	Nissan A12 1.3 L I4	15	(Japan) Koichi Nishikawa	D	2
Koichi Nishikawa	Nissan	Nissan Sunny	Nissan A12 1.3 L I4	15	(Japan) Yasumi Fukao	D	2
Hiro Racing	Toyota	Toyota Starlet	Toyota 4K-E 1.3 L I4	16	(Japan) Makoto Iwasaki	B	1
Hiro Racing	Toyota	Toyota Starlet	Toyota 4K-E 1.3 L I4	16	(Japan) Masashi Kitagawa	B	1
Hiro Racing	Toyota	Toyota Starlet	Toyota 4K-E 1.3 L I4	30	(Japan) Makoto Iwasaki	B	2
Hiro Racing	Toyota	Toyota Starlet	Toyota 4K-E 1.3 L I4	30	(Japan) Kozo Okumura	B	2
Hideki Ogawa	West	West 83S	Subaru EA81 1.8 L F4	16	(Japan) Hideki Ogawa	D	2
Hideki Ogawa	West	West 83S	Subaru EA81 1.8 L F4	16	(Japan) Shuji Fujii	D	2
Hideki Ogawa	West	West 83S	Subaru EA81 1.8 L F4	16	(Japan) Makio Nonaka	D	2
ARCN	Nissan	Nissan Sunny	Nissan A12 1.3 L I4	18	(Japan) Kiyotaka Nonomura	D	1–2
ARCN	Nissan	Nissan Sunny	Nissan A12 1.3 L I4	18	(Japan) Mitsuo Yamamoto	D	1–2
Central 20 Racing Team	Nissan	Nissan Sunny	Nissan A12 1.3 L I4	20	(Japan) Hiroshi Tomioka	D	1
Central 20 Racing Team	Nissan	Nissan Sunny	Nissan A12 1.3 L I4	20	(Hong Kong) Peter Chau	D	2
Central 20 Racing Team	Nissan	Nissan Sunny	Nissan A12 1.3 L I4	20	"S. Kockie" (Note: Nationality unknown)	D	2
Suda Racing	Toyota	Toyota Starlet	Toyota 4K-E 1.3 L I4	21	(Japan) Yoshinori Sakurai	B	1–2
Suda Racing	Toyota	Toyota Starlet	Toyota 4K-E 1.3 L I4	21	(Japan) Masafumi Suda	B	1
Suda Racing	Toyota	Toyota Starlet	Toyota 4K-E 1.3 L I4	21	(Japan) Hideki Iida	B	2
Kumida Racing	West	West 83S	Subaru EA81 1.8 L F4	22	(Japan) Yukio Minagawa	D	2
Kumida Racing	West	West 83S	Subaru EA81 1.8 L F4	22	(Japan) Seiji Omura	D	2
Racing Service Masakazu	Nissan	Nissan Sunny	Nissan A12 1.3 L I4	24	(Japan) Teruki Koshino	B	2
Racing Service Masakazu	Nissan	Nissan Sunny	Nissan A12 1.3 L I4	24	(Japan) Koji Sato	B	2
Umeda Tuning Shop	Nissan	Nissan Sunny	Nissan A12 1.3 L I4	26	(Japan) Masahiro Shimada	B	2
Umeda Tuning Shop	Nissan	Nissan Sunny	Nissan A12 1.3 L I4	26	(Japan) Yoshimasa Fujiwara	B	2
Kyoko Racing Club	Nissan	Nissan Sunny	Nissan A12 1.3 L I4	44	(Japan) Katsuhisa Toda	B	2
Kyoko Racing Club	Nissan	Nissan Sunny	Nissan A12 1.3 L I4	44	(Japan) Toyoaki Iwata	B	2
Team Yamato	Honda	Honda Civic	Honda EN1 1.3 L I4	68	(Japan) Tsuguo Ohba	B	1–2
Team Yamato	Honda	Honda Civic	Honda EN1 1.3 L I4	68	(Japan) Katsuaki Sato	B	1–2
TMSC	Toyota	Toyota Starlet	Toyota 4K-E 1.3 L I4	69	(Japan) Satoshi Fujita	D	1–2
TMSC	Toyota	Toyota Starlet	Toyota 4K-E 1.3 L I4	69	(Japan) Shuji Fujii	D	1–2
Bellco West	West	West 83S	Subaru EA81 1.8 L F4	76	(Japan) Hideki Ogawa	D	1
Bellco West	West	West 83S	Subaru EA81 1.8 L F4	76	(Japan) Makio Nonaka	D	1
NRC	Toyota	Toyota Starlet	Toyota 4K-E 1.3 L I4	92	(Japan) Masahiro Kimoto	D	1
NRC	Toyota	Toyota Starlet	Toyota 4K-E 1.3 L I4	92	(Japan) Norimasa Sakamoto	D	1

=== GT Japan ===
Team	Make	Car	Engine	No.	Drivers	Tyre	Rounds
Yours Sports	Mazda	Mazda RX-7 254	Mazda RE13B 1.3 L 2-rotor	120	(Japan) Hideki Okada	D	3
Yours Sports	Mazda	Mazda RX-7 254	Mazda RE13B 1.3 L 2-rotor	120	(Japan) Akio Morimoto	D	3
Yours Sports	Mazda	Mazda RX-7 254	Mazda RE13B 1.3 L 2-rotor	120	(Japan) Seiichi Okada	D	3
Yours Sports	Mazda	Mazda RX-7 254	Mazda RE13B 1.3 L 2-rotor	121	(Japan) Chikage Oguchi	D	3
Yours Sports	Mazda	Mazda RX-7 254	Mazda RE13B 1.3 L 2-rotor	121	(Japan) Toshio Fujimura	D	3
Trust Racing Team	Toyota	Toyota Celica	Toyota 18R-G 2.0 L I4	122	(Japan) Ryusaku Hitomi	D	3
Trust Racing Team	Toyota	Toyota Celica	Toyota 18R-G 2.0 L I4	122	(Japan) Mitsutake Koma	D	3
ERC Racing	Mazda	Mazda RX-7 253	Mazda RE13B 1.3 L 2-rotor	123	(Japan) Masaatsu Ohya	D	3
ERC Racing	Mazda	Mazda RX-7 253	Mazda RE13B 1.3 L 2-rotor	123	(Japan) Shinichi Katsuki	D	3
ERC Racing	Mazda	Mazda RX-7 253	Mazda RE13B 1.3 L 2-rotor	123	(Japan) Yoshio Ishikawa	D	3
Sansho Kogyo Racing Team	Mazda	Mazda RX-7 825	Mazda RE13B 1.3 L 2-rotor	125	(Japan) Toru Shimegi	B	3
Sansho Kogyo Racing Team	Mazda	Mazda RX-7 825	Mazda RE13B 1.3 L 2-rotor	125	(Japan) Yoshiyuki Ogura	B	3
Sansho Kogyo Racing Team	Mazda	Mazda RX-7 825	Mazda RE13B 1.3 L 2-rotor	125	(Japan) Yoshimasa Matsumoto	B	3
Mishima Auto Racing	Mazda	Mazda RX-7 253	Mazda RE13B 1.3 L 2-rotor	126	(Japan) Minoru Sawada	D	3
Mishima Auto Racing	Mazda	Mazda RX-7 253	Mazda RE13B 1.3 L 2-rotor	126	(Japan) Kaneyuki Okamoto	D	3
Mishima Auto Racing	Mazda	Mazda RX-7 253	Mazda RE13B 1.3 L 2-rotor	126	(Japan) Toyoshi Sugiyama	D	3
TRS Itabashi	Mazda	Mazda RX-7 253i	Mazda RE13B 1.3 L 2-rotor	130	(Japan) Tsutomu Itabashi	D	3
TRS Itabashi	Mazda	Mazda RX-7 253i	Mazda RE13B 1.3 L 2-rotor	130	(Japan) Tetsuji Tabata	D	3
TRS Itabashi	Mazda	Mazda RX-7 253i	Mazda RE13B 1.3 L 2-rotor	130	(Japan) Kimiya Iwanalaya	D	3
TRS Itabashi	Mazda	Mazda RX-7 253i	Mazda RE13B 1.3 L 2-rotor	130	(Japan) Oneri Wenyapaimi	D	3
Team No. 3 Racing	Mazda	Mazda RX-7 253i	Mazda RE13B 1.3 L 2-rotor	133	(Japan) Seiji Kusano	D	3
Team No. 3 Racing	Mazda	Mazda RX-7 253i	Mazda RE13B 1.3 L 2-rotor	133	(Japan) Yasuhiro Isozaki	D	3
Team No. 3 Racing	Mazda	Mazda RX-7 253i	Mazda RE13B 1.3 L 2-rotor	133	(Japan) Tadao Furusawa	D	3
Gotanzaka Enterprise	Nissan	Nissan Fairlady Z	Nissan L28E 2.8 L I6	136	(Japan) Yoshio Nagata	D	3
Gotanzaka Enterprise	Nissan	Nissan Fairlady Z	Nissan L28E 2.8 L I6	136	(Japan) Hiroyuki Miyagawa	D	3
Gotanzaka Enterprise	Nissan	Nissan Fairlady Z	Nissan L28E 2.8 L I6	136	(Japan) Takamichi Shinohara	D	3
Tomei Jidosha	Nissan	Nissan Sunny	Nissan LZ14 1.6 L I4	171	(Japan) Yoshiaki Jitsukawa	D	3
Tomei Jidosha	Nissan	Nissan Sunny	Nissan LZ14 1.6 L I4	171	(Japan) Motoji Sekine	D	3
Shizumatsu Racing	Mazda	Mazda RX-7 254	Mazda RE13B 1.3 L 2-rotor	180	(Japan) Tetsuji Shiratori	D	3
Shizumatsu Racing	Mazda	Mazda RX-7 254	Mazda RE13B 1.3 L 2-rotor	180	(Japan) Seisaku Suzuki	D	3
Shizumatsu Racing	Mazda	Mazda RX-7 254	Mazda RE13B 1.3 L 2-rotor	180	(Japan) Osamu Ihara	D	3
Mazda Sport Car Club	Mazda	Mazda RX-7 254	Mazda RE13B 1.3 L 2-rotor	181	(Japan) Kenji Seino	D	3
Mazda Sport Car Club	Mazda	Mazda RX-7 254	Mazda RE13B 1.3 L 2-rotor	181	(Japan) Masashi Kitagawa	D	3
Mazda Sport Car Club	Mazda	Mazda RX-7 254	Mazda RE13B 1.3 L 2-rotor	181	(Japan) Yasaharu Nakajima	D	3
Mazda Sport Car Club	Mazda	Mazda RX-7 254	Mazda RE13B 1.3 L 2-rotor	182	(Japan) Kanjun Arai	D	3
Mazda Sport Car Club	Mazda	Mazda RX-7 254	Mazda RE13B 1.3 L 2-rotor	182	(Japan) Yuichi Hagiwara	D	3
Mazda Sport Car Club	Mazda	Mazda RX-7 254	Mazda RE13B 1.3 L 2-rotor	182	(Japan) Minoru Yajima	D	3

== Schedule ==
All races were held in Japan.

Round	Race	Circuit	Date
1	International Suzuka 500 km	Suzuka Circuit	3 April
2	International Suzuka 1000 km	Suzuka Circuit	28 August
3	WEC-Japan	Fuji Speedway	2 October

== Season results ==
Season results are as follows:

Round	Circuit	Winning team
Round	Circuit	Winning drivers
1	Suzuka Circuit	#1 Trust Racing Team Porsche 956
1	Suzuka Circuit	(Australia) Vern Schuppan (Japan) Naohiro Fujita
2	Suzuka Circuit; Report	#1 Trust Racing Team Porsche 956
2	Suzuka Circuit; Report	(Australia) Vern Schuppan (Japan) Naohiro Fujita
3	Mt. Fuji; Report	#2 Rothmans Porsche 956
3	Mt. Fuji; Report	(United Kingdom) Derek Bell (Germany) Stefan Bellof

== Point Ranking ==
=== Drivers ===
Rank	Drivers	Number/Team	Points	Wins
1	(Australia) Vern Schuppan	#1 Trust Racing Team Porsche 956 #6 Trust Racing Team Porsche 956	52	2
2	(Japan) Naohiro Fujita	#1 Trust Racing Team Porsche 956 #6 Trust Racing Team Porsche 956	52	2
3	(Japan) Taku Akaike	#7 Alpha Racing Team MCS Guppy-Mazda #62 Alpha Racing Team Mazda 83C	24	0
4	(Germany) Stefan Bellof	#2 Rothmans Porsche 956	20	1
5	(United Kingdom) Derek Bell	#2 Rothmans Porsche 956	20	1
