= 1984 All Japan Endurance Championship =

Motorsports season

Seasons
- ← 1983 1985 →

The 1984 All Japan Endurance Championship was the second season of the All Japan Sports Prototype Championship. The 1984 champion was the Auto Beaurex Motorsport Lotec M1C-BMW driven by Naoki Nagasaka.

== Entry list ==
=== C/B ===
- For the WEC-Japan event, JSPC teams used different car numbers to avoid conflicts with the car numbers of the entrants of the World Sportscar Championship; each car's WEC-Japan race number is displayed in tooltips.

Team	Make	Car	Engine	No.	Drivers	Tyre	Rounds
Trust Racing Team	Porsche	Porsche 956B	Porsche 935/79 2.6 L Twin Turbo F6	1	(Australia) Vern Schuppan	D	1, 3–4
Trust Racing Team	Porsche	Porsche 956B	Porsche 935/79 2.6 L Twin Turbo F6	1	(Japan) Yoshimi Katayama	D	1, 3
Trust Racing Team	Porsche	Porsche 956B	Porsche 935/79 2.6 L Twin Turbo F6	1	(Germany) Hans-Joachim Stuck	D	4
Alpha Cubic Racing Team	MCS	MCS Guppy	BMW M12/7 2.0 L I4	2	(Japan) Noritake Takahara	B	1, 3–4
Alpha Cubic Racing Team	MCS	MCS Guppy	BMW M12/7 2.0 L I4	2	(Japan) Chiyomi Totani	B	1, 3–4
From A Racing	Porsche	Porsche 956B	Porsche 935/79 2.6 L Twin Turbo F6	3	(Japan) Jiro Yoneyama	D	3–4
From A Racing	Porsche	Porsche 956B	Porsche 935/79 2.6 L Twin Turbo F6	3	(Japan) Chikage Oguchi	D	3–4
Setrab Racing by Yours	Mazda	Mazda 717C	Mazda RE13B 1.3 L 2-rotor	7	(Japan) Takashi Yorino	D	1–2
Setrab Racing by Yours	Mazda	Mazda 717C	Mazda RE13B 1.3 L 2-rotor	7	(Japan) Hideki Okada	D	1–2
Setrab Racing by Yours	Mazda	Mazda 727C	Mazda RE13B 1.3 L 2-rotor	7	(Japan) Takashi Yorino	D	3
Setrab Racing by Yours	Mazda	Mazda 727C	Mazda RE13B 1.3 L 2-rotor	7	(Japan) Hideki Okada	D	3
Setrab Racing by Yours	Mazda	Mazda 727C	Mazda RE13B 1.3 L 2-rotor	85	(Japan) Hideki Okada	D	4
Setrab Racing by Yours	Mazda	Mazda 727C	Mazda RE13B 1.3 L 2-rotor	85	(Japan) Masatomo Shimizu	D	4
Setrab Racing by Yours	Mazda	Mazda 727C	Mazda RE13B 1.3 L 2-rotor	85	(Japan) Tomohiko Tsutsumi	D	4
Hasemi Motorsport	Nissan	Nissan Skyline Turbo C	Nissan LZ20B 2.1 L Turbo I4	11	(Japan) Masahiro Hasemi	D	3–4
Hasemi Motorsport	Nissan	Nissan Skyline Turbo C	Nissan LZ20B 2.1 L Turbo I4	11	(Japan) Kenji Tohira	D	3–4
Hasemi Motorsport	Nissan	Nissan Skyline Turbo C	Nissan LZ20B 2.1 L Turbo I4	11	(Japan) Yoshiyasu Tachi	D	3
Panasport Japan	Nissan	Nissan Panasport Turbo C	Nissan LZ20B 2.1 L Turbo I4	12	(Japan) Keiji Matsumoto	B	1, 3–4
Panasport Japan	Nissan	Nissan Panasport Turbo C	Nissan LZ20B 2.1 L Turbo I4	12	(Japan) Kenji Takahashi	B	1
Panasport Japan	Nissan	Nissan Panasport Turbo C	Nissan LZ20B 2.1 L Turbo I4	12	(Japan) Osamu Nakako	B	3–4
Mazdaspeed	March	March 84G	Mazda RE13B 1.3 L Twin Turbo 2-rotor	17	(Japan) Yoshimi Katayama	D	4
Mazdaspeed	March	March 84G	Mazda RE13B 1.3 L Twin Turbo 2-rotor	17	(Japan) Takashi Yorino	D	4
Mazdaspeed	Mazda	Mazda 727C	Mazda RE13B 1.3 L 2-rotor	86	(Japan) Takashi Yorino	D	1, 4
Mazdaspeed	Mazda	Mazda 727C	Mazda RE13B 1.3 L 2-rotor	86	(Republic of Ireland) David Kennedy	D	4
Mazdaspeed	Mazda	Mazda 727C	Mazda RE13B 1.3 L 2-rotor	87	(Republic of Ireland) David Kennedy	D	4
Mazdaspeed	Mazda	Mazda 727C	Mazda RE13B 1.3 L 2-rotor	87	(Belgium) Jean-Michel Martin	D	4
ADVAN Nova	Porsche	Porsche 956B	Porsche 935/79 2.6 L Twin Turbo F6	18	(Japan) Kunimitsu Takahashi	Y	3–4
ADVAN Nova	Porsche	Porsche 956B	Porsche 935/79 2.6 L Twin Turbo F6	18	(Japan) Kenji Takahashi	Y	3–4
ADVAN Nova	Porsche	Porsche 956B	Porsche 935/79 2.6 L Twin Turbo F6	18	(United Kingdom) Geoff Lees	Y	3–4
Central 20 Racing Team	Nissan	Nissan Fairlady Z Turbo C	Nissan LZ20B 2.1 L Twin Turbo I4	20	(Japan) Haruhito Yanagida	D	1, 3–4
Central 20 Racing Team	Nissan	Nissan Fairlady Z Turbo C	Nissan LZ20B 2.1 L Twin Turbo I4	20	(Japan) Takao Wada	D	1, 3–4
Central 20 Racing Team	Nissan	Nissan Fairlady Z Turbo C	Nissan LZ20B 2.1 L Twin Turbo I4	20	(Japan) Tomohiko Tsutsumi	D	3
Hoshino Racing	Nissan	Nissan Silvia Turbo C	Nissan LZ20B 2.1 L Turbo I4	23	(Japan) Kazuyoshi Hoshino	B	1, 3–4
Hoshino Racing	Nissan	Nissan Silvia Turbo C	Nissan LZ20B 2.1 L Turbo I4	23	(Japan) Akira Hagiwara	B	1, 3–4
Autobacs Racing with Uchida	Dome	Dome RC83 i	Ford DFL 4.0 L V8	28	(Sweden) Eje Elgh	D	1
Autobacs Racing with Uchida	Dome	Dome RC83 i	Ford DFL 4.0 L V8	28	(Sweden) Stanley Dickens	D	1
Autobacs Racing with Uchida	Dome	Dome RC83 i	Ford DFL 4.0 L V8	28	(Japan) Aguri Suzuki	D	3–4
Autobacs Racing with Uchida	Dome	Dome RC83 i	Ford DFL 4.0 L V8	28	(Japan) Kaoru Hoshino	D	3
Autobacs Racing with Uchida	Dome	Dome RC83 i	Ford DFL 4.0 L V8	28	(Japan) Shinji Uchida	D	3
Autobacs Racing with Uchida	Dome	Dome RC83 i	Ford DFL 4.0 L V8	28	(United Kingdom) Rupert Keegan	D	4
Team Taku (Note: Competed as #33 in Rd. 2)	MCS	MCS Guppy	Mazda RE13B 1.3 L 2-rotor	31	(Japan) Taku Akaike	B	2–3
Team Taku	MCS	MCS Guppy	Mazda RE13B 1.3 L 2-rotor	31	(Japan) Toru Shimegi	B	2–3
XEBEC Motorsport Division	Dome	Dome RC83	Toyota 4T-GT 2.1 L Turbo I4	35	(Japan) Kiyoshi Misaki	B	4
XEBEC Motorsport Division	Dome	Dome RC83	Toyota 4T-GT 2.1 L Turbo I4	35	(Japan) Kaoru Hoshino	B	4
XEBEC Motorsport Division	Dome	Dome RC83	Toyota 4T-GT 2.1 L Turbo I4	35	(Japan) Hikaru Hagiwara	B	4
TOM'S	Toyota	TOM'S 84C	Toyota 4T-GT 2.1 L Turbo I4	36	(Japan) Satoru Nakajima	B	4
TOM'S	Toyota	TOM'S 84C	Toyota 4T-GT 2.1 L Turbo I4	36	(Japan) Keiji Matsumoto	B	4
TOM'S	Toyota	TOM'S 84C	Toyota 4T-GT 2.1 L Turbo I4	36	(Japan) Masanori Sekiya	B	4
Team Ikuzawa	Toyota	TOM'S 84C	Toyota 4T-GT 2.1 L Turbo I4	37	(United Kingdom) Tiff Needell	D	4
Team Ikuzawa	Toyota	TOM'S 84C	Toyota 4T-GT 2.1 L Turbo I4	37	(United Kingdom) James Weaver	D	4
Dome Motorsport	Toyota	TOM'S 84C	Toyota 4T-GT 2.1 L Turbo I4	38	(Sweden) Eje Elgh	D	3–4
Dome Motorsport	Toyota	TOM'S 84C	Toyota 4T-GT 2.1 L Turbo I4	38	(Sweden) Stanley Dickens	D	3
Dome Motorsport	Toyota	TOM'S 84C	Toyota 4T-GT 2.1 L Turbo I4	38	(Japan) Masanori Sekiya	D	4
Auto Beaurex Motorsport (Note: Competed as #10 from Rd. 1–2)	Lotec	Lotec M1C	BMW M88 3.5 L I6	62	(Japan) Naoki Nagasaka	D	All
Auto Beaurex Motorsport	Lotec	Lotec M1C	BMW M88 3.5 L I6	62	(Japan) Keiichi Suzuki	D	All
Mishima Auto	MCS	MCS Guppy	BMW M12/7 2.0 L I4	74	(Japan) Toru Sawada	D	4
Mishima Auto	MCS	MCS Guppy	BMW M12/7 2.0 L I4	74	(Japan) Kaneyuki Okamoto	D	4
Team Iwaki	MCS	MCS Guppy	Toyota 18R-G 2.0 L I4	78	(Japan) Koichi Iwaki	D	4
Team Iwaki	MCS	MCS Guppy	Toyota 18R-G 2.0 L I4	78	(Japan) Masakazu Nakamura	D	4
Team Iwaki	MCS	MCS Guppy	Toyota 18R-G 2.0 L I4	78	(Japan) Takashi Tosa	D	4

=== A/GTX ===
Team	Make	Car	Engine	No.	Drivers	Tyre	Rounds
Mecca	West	West 83S	Subaru EA81 1.8 L F4	2	(Japan) Makoto Kaneko	D	2
Mecca	West	West 83S	Subaru EA81 1.8 L F4	2	(Japan) Satoshi Ikezawa	D	2
Mecca	West	West 83S	Subaru EA81 1.8 L F4	2	(Japan) Matsuo Nakayama	D	2
Auto Kamida	West	West 83S-II	Honda EN1 1.3 L I4	3	(Japan) Seiji Omura	D	1–2
Auto Kamida	West	West 83S-II	Honda EN1 1.3 L I4	3	(Japan) Masaharu Kinoshita	D	1–2
Horii Racing	West	West 83S-II	Subaru EA81 1.8 L F4	5	(Japan) Nobuyoshi Horii	D	1
Horii Racing	West	West 83S-II	Subaru EA81 1.8 L F4	5	(Japan) Hajime Kajiwara	D	1
Horii Racing	West	West 83S-II	Subaru EA81 1.8 L F4	38	(Japan) Nobuyoshi Horii	D	3
Horii Racing	West	West 83S-II	Subaru EA81 1.8 L F4	38	(Japan) Osamu Nakajima	D	3
Shinryo Yonesaka	West	West 83S-II	Mitsubishi 4G63 2.0 L I4	6	(Japan) Akihiro Matsuda	D	1
Shinryo Yonesaka	West	West 83S-II	Mitsubishi 4G63 2.0 L I4	6	(Japan) Michiko Hashimoto	D	1
TRS Itabashi	Mazda	Mazda RX-7 825	Mazda RE13B 1.3 L 2-rotor	6	(Japan) Tsutomu Itabashi	D	2
TRS Itabashi	Mazda	Mazda RX-7 825	Mazda RE13B 1.3 L 2-rotor	6	(Japan) Yoshimasa Matsumoto	D	2
TRS Itabashi	Mazda	Mazda RX-7 825	Mazda RE13B 1.3 L 2-rotor	6	(Japan) Kenichi Kaneko	D	2
Target Oil	Manatee	Manatee Mk.IV	Mazda RE13B 1.3 L 2-rotor	7	(Japan) Masuo Takada	Y	1
Target Oil	Manatee	Manatee Mk.IV	Mazda RE13B 1.3 L 2-rotor	7	(Japan) Hitoshi Tomita	Y	1
Yours Sport	Mazda	Mazda RX-7 254	Mazda RE13B 1.3 L 2-rotor	8	(Japan) Yoshimasa Fujiwara	D	3
Yours Sport	Mazda	Mazda RX-7 254	Mazda RE13B 1.3 L 2-rotor	8	(Japan) Masahiro Shimada	D	3
Yours Sport	Mazda	Mazda RX-7 254	Mazda RE13B 1.3 L 2-rotor	9	(Japan) Hironobu Tatsumi	D	1
Yours Sport	Mazda	Mazda RX-7 254	Mazda RE13B 1.3 L 2-rotor	9	(Japan) Sadafumi Nakajima	D	1
TOM'S	Toyota	Toyota Celica LB Turbo	Toyota 18R-G 2.1 L Turbo I4	9	(Japan) Satoru Nakajima	B	2
TOM'S	Toyota	Toyota Celica LB Turbo	Toyota 18R-G 2.1 L Turbo I4	9	(Japan) Masanori Sekiya	B	2
TOM'S	Toyota	Toyota Corolla Levin	Toyota 4A 1.6 L I4	26	(Japan) Masami Takagi	B	3
TOM'S	Toyota	Toyota Corolla Levin	Toyota 4A 1.6 L I4	26	(Hong Kong) Peter Chau	B	3
TOM'S	Toyota	Toyota Corolla Levin	Toyota 4A 1.6 L I4	26	(Japan) Masami Ishikawa	B	3
Hajime Oshiro	Manatee	Manatee Mk.IV	Mazda RE13B 1.3 L 2-rotor	10	(Japan) Hajime Oshiro	D	3
Hajime Oshiro	Manatee	Manatee Mk.IV	Mazda RE13B 1.3 L 2-rotor	10	(Japan) Eiji Yamada	D	3
Hajime Oshiro	Manatee	Manatee Mk.IV	Mazda RE13B 1.3 L 2-rotor	10	(Japan) Hideshi Matsuda	D	3
AMRC Miyakoya	Mazda	Mazda RX-7 253	Mazda RE13B 1.3 L 2-rotor	11	(Japan) Masahiro Kimoto	D	1
AMRC Miyakoya	Mazda	Mazda RX-7 253	Mazda RE13B 1.3 L 2-rotor	11	(Japan) Yasuhiro Isozaki	D	1
Daimyojin	West	West 83S-II	Subaru EA81 1.8 L F4	14	(Japan) Keiichi Mizutani	D	1
Daimyojin	West	West 83S-II	Subaru EA81 1.8 L F4	14	(Japan) Hiroyuki Kondo	D	1
Daimyojin	West	West 83S-II	Mazda RE13B 1.3 L 2-rotor	33	(Japan) Keiichi Mizutani	D	3
Daimyojin	West	West 83S-II	Mazda RE13B 1.3 L 2-rotor	33	(Japan) Masato Kito	D	3
Daimyojin	West	West 83S-II	Mazda RE13B 1.3 L 2-rotor	33	(Japan) Hiroyuki Kondo	D	3
Valvoline	Manatee	Manatee Mk.IV	Mazda RE13B 1.3 L 2-rotor	14	(Japan) Tetsuya Kasai	D	3
Valvoline	Manatee	Manatee Mk.IV	Mazda RE13B 1.3 L 2-rotor	14	(Japan) Shigeki Matsui	D	3
Valvoline	Manatee	Manatee Mk.IV	Mazda RE13B 1.3 L 2-rotor	14	(Japan) Koichi Tahara	D	3
Capris Enterprise	Mazda	Mazda RX-7 253	Mazda RE13B 1.3 L 2-rotor	15	(Japan) Kazuyoshi Sakamoto	D	1
Capris Enterprise	Mazda	Mazda RX-7 253	Mazda RE13B 1.3 L 2-rotor	15	(Japan) Hiroshi Noda	D	1
Kansai Jukosha	West	West 83S-II	Mazda RE13B 1.3 L 2-rotor	16	(Japan) Hideki Ogawa	D	1, 3
Kansai Jukosha	West	West 83S-II	Mazda RE13B 1.3 L 2-rotor	16	(Japan) Shuji Fujii	D	1, 3
Kansai Jukosha	West	West 83S-II	Mazda RE13B 1.3 L 2-rotor	16	(Japan) Kenji Iya	D	3
Kansai Jukosha	West	West 83S-II	Mazda RE13B 1.3 L 2-rotor	76	(Japan) Hideki Ogawa	D	2
Kansai Jukosha	West	West 83S-II	Mazda RE13B 1.3 L 2-rotor	76	(Japan) Shuji Fujii	D	2
From A Racing	Mazda	Mazda RX-7 254	Mazda RE13B 1.3 L 2-rotor	17	(Japan) Jiro Yoneyama	D	1
From A Racing	Mazda	Mazda RX-7 254	Mazda RE13B 1.3 L 2-rotor	17	(Japan) Chikage Oguchi	D	1
Car Shop Kakogawa	Nissan	Nissan Sunny	Nissan A12 1.3 L I4	18	(Japan) Kiyotaka Nonomura	D	1
Car Shop Kakogawa	Nissan	Nissan Sunny	Nissan A12 1.3 L I4	18	(Japan) Mitsuo Yamamoto	D	1
Car Shop Kakogawa	Nissan	Nissan Sunny	Nissan A12 1.3 L I4	39	(Japan) Kiyotaka Nonomura	D	2
Car Shop Kakogawa	Nissan	Nissan Sunny	Nissan A12 1.3 L I4	39	(Japan) Mitsuo Yamamoto	D	2
Norikura	Mazda	Mazda RX-7 254	Mazda RE13B 1.3 L 2-rotor	18	(Japan) Yoshimasa Fujiwara	D	2
Norikura	Mazda	Mazda RX-7 254	Mazda RE13B 1.3 L 2-rotor	18	(Japan) Masahiro Shimada	D	2
Racing Service Showa	Nissan	Nissan Sunny	Nissan A12 1.3 L I4	21	(Japan) Naoki Wakasugi	D	1
Racing Service Showa	Nissan	Nissan Sunny	Nissan A12 1.3 L I4	21	(Japan) Teruki Koshino	D	1
Racing Service Showa	Manatee	Manatee Mk.IV	Mazda RE13B 1.3 L 2-rotor	35	(Japan) Teruki Koshino	D	3
Racing Service Showa	Manatee	Manatee Mk.IV	Mazda RE13B 1.3 L 2-rotor	35	(Japan) Koji Sato	D	3
Racing Service Showa	Manatee	Manatee Mk.IV	Mazda RE13B 1.3 L 2-rotor	35	(Japan) Yukinobu Mizutani	D	3
Trust Racing Team	Toyota	Toyota Celica LB Turbo	Toyota 18R-G 2.1 L Turbo I4	21	(Japan) Ryusaku Hitomi	D	3
Trust Racing Team	Toyota	Toyota Celica LB Turbo	Toyota 18R-G 2.1 L Turbo I4	21	(Japan) Mitsutake Koma	D	3
OlonaminC	Mazda	Mazda RX-7 254	Mazda RE13B 1.3 L 2-rotor	22	(Japan) Yoshimasa Fujiwara	D	1
OlonaminC	Mazda	Mazda RX-7 254	Mazda RE13B 1.3 L 2-rotor	22	(Japan) Masahiro Shimada	D	1
THK Bearing	West	West 83S-II	Mazda RE13B 1.3 L 2-rotor	22	(Japan) Fumiko Shinoda	D	3
THK Bearing	West	West 83S-II	Mazda RE13B 1.3 L 2-rotor	22	(Japan) Shigehito Hirabayashi	D	3
Cockpit Inazawa	Manatee	Manatee Mk.IV	Mazda RE13B 1.3 L 2-rotor	24	(Japan) Takayoshi Fukaya	B	1
Cockpit Inazawa	Manatee	Manatee Mk.IV	Mazda RE13B 1.3 L 2-rotor	24	(Japan) Koji Sato	B	1
Fuminori Shimogishi	Mazda	Mazda RX-7 253	Mazda RE13B 1.3 L 2-rotor	25	(Japan) Fuminori Shimogishi	D	3
Fuminori Shimogishi	Mazda	Mazda RX-7 253	Mazda RE13B 1.3 L 2-rotor	25	(Japan) Zenkichi Maruko	D	3
Fuminori Shimogishi	Mazda	Mazda RX-7 253	Mazda RE13B 1.3 L 2-rotor	25	(Japan) Kozo Kamata	D	3
Mariko Racing Team	West	West 83S-II	Subaru EA81 1.8 L F4	27	(Japan) Junichi Ikura	D	1–2
Mariko Racing Team	West	West 83S-II	Subaru EA81 1.8 L F4	27	(Japan) Yukio Mihagawa	D	1–2
Jonian Ogawa	Nissan	Nissan Sunny	Nissan A12 1.3 L I4	29	(Japan) Hideki Iida	D	3
Jonian Ogawa	Nissan	Nissan Sunny	Nissan A12 1.3 L I4	29	(Japan) Taido Hashimoto	D	3
Jonian Ogawa	Nissan	Nissan Sunny	Nissan A12 1.3 L I4	29	(Japan) Yoshinori Sakurai	D	3
Hiro Racing	Hiro	Hiro HRS-1	Mazda RE13B 1.3 L 2-rotor	30	(Japan) Masashi Kitagawa	D	3
Hiro Racing	Hiro	Hiro HRS-1	Mazda RE13B 1.3 L 2-rotor	30	(Japan) Kozo Okumura	D	3
Hiro & OOE	Toyota	Toyota Starlet	Toyota 4K-E 1.3 L I4	31	(Japan) Yoshimasa Nakamura	Y	1
Hiro & OOE	Toyota	Toyota Starlet	Toyota 4K-E 1.3 L I4	31	(Japan) Kazuya Nishiyama	Y	1
Oguri Tekko	Nissan	Nissan Sunny	Nissan A12 1.3 L I4	32	(Japan) Koichi Nishikawa	D	3
Oguri Tekko	Nissan	Nissan Sunny	Nissan A12 1.3 L I4	32	(Japan) Yasumi Fukao	D	3
Taku	Mazda	Mazda RX-7 253	Mazda RE13B 1.3 L 2-rotor	34	(Japan) Kaoru Iida	D	2
Taku	Mazda	Mazda RX-7 253	Mazda RE13B 1.3 L 2-rotor	34	(Japan) Koichi Iwaki	D	2
Desbea	Mazda	Mazda RX-7 825	Mazda RE13B 1.3 L 2-rotor	36	(Japan) Masahiro Kimoto	D	3
Desbea	Mazda	Mazda RX-7 825	Mazda RE13B 1.3 L 2-rotor	36	(Japan) Norimasa Sakamoto	D	3
Reconte	Manatee	Manatee Mk.IV	Mazda RE13B 1.3 L 2-rotor	41	(Japan) Tetsuya Kasai	D	1
Reconte	Manatee	Manatee Mk.IV	Mazda RE13B 1.3 L 2-rotor	41	(Japan) Ikuji Yamamoto	D	1
Geka	Mazda	Mazda RX-7 253	Mazda RE13B 1.3 L 2-rotor	41	(Japan) Motozo Fujikawa	Y	2
Geka	Mazda	Mazda RX-7 253	Mazda RE13B 1.3 L 2-rotor	41	(Japan) Tatsuki Yoshioka	Y	2
Geka	Mazda	Mazda RX-7 253	Mazda RE13B 1.3 L 2-rotor	41	(Japan) Kazuyuki Yoshizaki	Y	2
Toda Toso	Nissan	Nissan Sunny	Nissan A12 1.3 L I4	44	(Japan) Katsuhisa Toda	D	1, 3
Toda Toso	Nissan	Nissan Sunny	Nissan A12 1.3 L I4	44	(Japan) Toyoaki Iwata	D	1, 3
First Morlding	Collage	Collage FM45	Mazda RE13B 1.3 L 2-rotor	45	(Japan) Makio Nonaka	D	1, 3
First Morlding	Collage	Collage FM45	Mazda RE13B 1.3 L 2-rotor	45	(Japan) Masuo Takada	D	3
Meiwa MSC	Honda	Honda Ballade Sports CR-X	Honda D16A 1.6 L I4	67	(Japan) Tsuguo Ohba	B	3
Meiwa MSC	Honda	Honda Ballade Sports CR-X	Honda D16A 1.6 L I4	67	(Japan) Masami Fujita	B	3
Meiwa MSC	Honda	Honda Ballade Sports CR-X	Honda D16A 1.6 L I4	67	(Japan) Katsuaki Sato	B	3
Team Yamato	Honda	Honda Civic	Honda EN1 1.3 L I4	68	(Japan) Ken Mizokawa	B	1, 3
Team Yamato	Honda	Honda Civic	Honda EN1 1.3 L I4	68	(Japan) Katsuaki Sato	B	1
Team Yamato	Honda	Honda Civic	Honda EN1 1.3 L I4	68	(Japan) Yoshimi Watanabe	B	3
Team Yamato	Honda	Honda Civic	Honda EN1 1.3 L I4	68	(Japan) Hiroyuki Makino	B	3
Watanabe Jidosha	Toyota	Toyota Starlet	Toyota 4K-E 1.3 L I4	69	(Japan) Satoshi Fujita	D	1, 3
Watanabe Jidosha	Toyota	Toyota Starlet	Toyota 4K-E 1.3 L I4	69	(Japan) Toshio Fujimura	D	1, 3
Setrab Racing by Yours	West	West 83S-II	Mazda RE13B 1.3 L 2-rotor	77	(Japan) Shigeharu Kumakura	D	3
Setrab Racing by Yours	West	West 83S-II	Mazda RE13B 1.3 L 2-rotor	77	(Japan) Toru Hirano	D	3
Setrab Racing by Yours	West	West 83S-II	Mazda RE13B 1.3 L 2-rotor	77	(Japan) Masako Fujikawa	D	3
NEF	BMW	BMW 320i	BMW S14 2.0 L I4	80	(Hong Kong) Adrian Fu	D	3
NEF	BMW	BMW 320i	BMW S14 2.0 L I4	80	(Hong Kong) Michael Liu	D	3
NEF	BMW	BMW 320i	BMW S14 2.0 L I4	80	(France) Daniel Latour	D	3
Top Fuel Racing	Mazda	Mazda RX-7 845	Mazda RE13B 1.3 L 2-rotor	88	(Japan) Hironobu Tatsumi	B	3
Top Fuel Racing	Mazda	Mazda RX-7 845	Mazda RE13B 1.3 L 2-rotor	88	(Japan) Mutsuo Kazama	B	3
Top Fuel Racing	Mazda	Mazda RX-7 845	Mazda RE13B 1.3 L 2-rotor	138	(Japan) Hironobu Tatsumi	B	4
Top Fuel Racing	Mazda	Mazda RX-7 845	Mazda RE13B 1.3 L 2-rotor	138	(Japan) Mutsuo Kazama	B	4
Top Fuel Racing	Mazda	Mazda RX-7 845	Mazda RE13B 1.3 L 2-rotor	138	(Japan) Yoshiyuki Ogura	B	4
Top Racing	Honda	Honda Prelude	Honda B20A 2.0 L I4	96	(Japan) Hideki Ahara	D	1, 3
Top Racing	Honda	Honda Prelude	Honda B20A 2.0 L I4	96	(Japan) Tamotsu Tomimatsu	D	1, 3
Top Racing	Honda	Honda Prelude	Honda B20A 2.0 L I4	96	(Japan) Nobuyoshi Kishimoto	D	3
Meiju Sport	Mazda	Mazda RX-7 254i	Mazda RE13B 1.3 L 2-rotor	135	(Japan) Akio Morimoto	B	4
Meiju Sport	Mazda	Mazda RX-7 254i	Mazda RE13B 1.3 L 2-rotor	135	(Japan) Seiichi Okada	B	4
Meiju Sport	Mazda	Mazda RX-7 254i	Mazda RE13B 1.3 L 2-rotor	135	(Japan) Fuminori Shimogishi	B	4
Mazda Sport Car Club	Mazda	Mazda RX-7 254i	Mazda RE13B 1.3 L 2-rotor	137	(Japan) Iwao Sugai	D	4
Mazda Sport Car Club	Mazda	Mazda RX-7 254i	Mazda RE13B 1.3 L 2-rotor	137	(Japan) Hiroshi Sugai	D	4

== Schedule ==
All races were held in Japan.

Round	Race	Circuit	Date
1	International Suzuka 500 km	Suzuka Circuit	1 April
2	RRC Tsukuba 4 Hours	Tsukuba Circuit	1 July
3	International Suzuka 1000 km	Suzuka Circuit	30 August
4	WEC-Japan	Fuji Speedway	30 September

== Season results ==
Season results are as follows:

Round	Circuit	Winning team
Round	Circuit	Winning drivers
1	Suzuka Circuit	#1 Trust Racing Team Porsche 956
1	Suzuka Circuit	(Australia) Vern Schuppan (Japan) Yoshimi Katayama
2	Tsukuba Circuit	#33 Team Taku Mazda 83C
2	Tsukuba Circuit	(Japan) Taku Akikake (Japan) Toru Shimegi
3	Suzuka Circuit; Report	#19 Team Nova Porsche 956
3	Suzuka Circuit; Report	(United Kingdom) Geoff Lees (Japan) Kunimitsu Takahashi (Japan) Kenji Takahashi
4	Mt. Fuji; Report	#2 Rothmans Porsche 956
4	Mt. Fuji; Report	(United Kingdom) John Watson (Germany) Stefan Bellof

== Point Ranking ==
=== Drivers ===
Rank	Drivers	Number/Team	Points	Wins
1	(Japan) Naoki Nagasaka	#10 Auto Beaurex Motorsport Lotec M1C-BMW #62 Auto Beaurex Motorsport Lotec M1C-BMW #84 Auto Beaurex Motorsport Lotec M1C-BMW	48	0
2	(Japan) Keiichi Suzuki	#10 Auto Beaurex Motorsport Lotec M1C-BMW #62 Auto Beaurex Motorsport Lotec M1C-BMW #84 Auto Beaurex Motorsport Lotec M1C-BMW	48	0
3	(Australia) Vern Schuppan	#1 Trust Racing Team Porsche 956 #60 Trust Racing Team Porsche 956	47	1
4	(Japan) Yoshimi Katayama	#1 Trust Racing Team Porsche 956 #17 Mazdaspeed March 84G	35	1
5	(Japan) Toru Shimegi	#33 Team Taku Mazda 83C #31 Team Taku Mazda 83C #83 Shimegi Racing Team Mazda 83C	33	1
