= Toyota Celica Liftback Turbo =

- Category: Group 5 sportscar racer
- Constructor: Schnitzer Motorsport
- Successor: Dome Celica Turbo

Technical specifications
- Wheelbase: 95.3 in (2,420.6 mm)
- Engine: TRD 152E 2,090 cc (127.5 cu in) I4 Turbocharger Front-engined, longitudinally mounted
- Transmission: Getrag 5-speed manual transmission
- Weight: 860 kg (1,896.0 lb)
- Fuel: Shell
- Tyres: Dunlop: 275/600R16 (front); 325/600R16 (rear); BBS (wheels): 12×16 (front); 14×16 (rear)

Competition history
- Notable entrants: Schnitzer Motorsport; Toyota Händler Lipp; TOM'S; Trust Japan
- Notable drivers: Harald Ertl; Rolf Stommelen; Gerhard Lipp; Nobuhide Tachi; Kaoru Hoshino; Tatsuhiko Kaneumi
- Debut: 1977 DRM Hockenheim
Races	Wins
21	2

The Toyota Celica Liftback Turbo was a Group 5 Special Production racecar version of the 3-door liftback first generation Toyota Celica GT built by Schnitzer via Toyota Deutschland to compete in Division 1 of the DRM.

It competed in the German series in 1977 and 1978. Plagued by reliability problems, it finished twice and won a non-championship race. At the end of its European career, it went on to compete in Japan with minor success.

Throughout its competitive seasons, it was the only Japanese car to compete in the top division of the German series.

== Development ==
Schnitzer established their racing operation in Freilassing in 1967, specializing in BMWs. They had secured the 1975 European Formula Two title for Jacques Laffite.

Schnitzer's relations with Toyota began when they had prepared rallying engines for factory Toyotas in late-1976. Having recognized the potential for turbocharging in their Celica's TRD 152E engine, they presented this idea to Ove Andersson, head of motorsport operations for Toyota Europe, and Adolf Hüngsberg, head of press at Toyota Deutschland, to help promote their cars in Germany.

Budget was set by Nobuji Araki, president of Toyota Germany and vice president overall, for million Deutsche Mark for the 1977 season, more than what Andersson would allow. Sponsorship was provided by optical manufacturer Rodenstock at 10,000 DM per race.

Development began on March 26, 1977, when a dark green 3-door liftback TA28 Toyota Celica ST arrived at Schnitzer's workshop. The car was disassembled to allow for modifications for its lightweight fiberglass bodywork, retaining its hood, roof, doors and rail panel.

The Celica's distinctive features are its wider body sills in front of and behind the door panel and sloping nose beyond the bonnet, which encases the double headlamps and square grille. The car sat 20 cm lower and 25 cm shorter than a BMW 2002 and was then the lowest-profile car in the championship.

Whilst the green car was used for mechanical installation of its engine and gearbox, a white liftback was provided by Toyota Deutschland for modelling work for its body. This car was later used as a donor car in event of accidents.

As reported by Auto Motor und Sport, a 1421cc engine was said to be built for Division 2, producing 380 hp. Schnitzer built the car to keep all auxiliary components as far away from the engine as possible, engine changes were said to have taken 30 minutes.

To keep up with its competition, Schnitzer used the Toyota 18R-G engine from its production model with a specially designed 16 valve cylinder head and a Kugelfischer fuel injection system topped up with a KKK turbocharger. The engine produced a total output of 560 hp (418 kW) from its bored 2,090 cc (127.5 cu in) engine.

== 1977 ==
Driven by Harald Ertl, the blue Celica suffered from issues having not received any test drive but a quick test fit before the race to meet their deadline. Its debut was at the eighth round of the DRM series in Hockenheimring in July 1977, supporting the German Grand Prix. Also, whilst Porsche took several years to develop turbochargers, Schnitzer only had four months to develop the car. Competition was strong at Division 1 from the numerous Porsche 935s that had also dominated international motorsport. As a result, it qualified thirteenth, 25 seconds per lap slower than the pole-winning 935, retiring from the race after four laps.

It returned for the following round in Zolder, qualifying seventh, five seconds slower than the pole-winning 935. There it retired after three laps. At the final round in Nürburgring, it finished fourth behind three privateer Porsche 935s which it had intended to compete against.

The Celica returned to Zolder for a non-championship ADAC Trophy to score its only victory.

== 1978 ==
In the 1978 season, the Celica color scheme was changed from blue to red and white, as Kathrein had stepped in as main sponsor. Red and white was their corporate color scheme. Rodenstock still retained their sponsorship as with Schnitzer's BMWs which also shared their nose revisions.

Rolf Stommelen, the defending champion with Gelo Racing, a top Porsche privateer, took over driving duties from Ertl, who stepped down to campaign BMWs with the team in the lower Division 2. At the first round in Zolder, the Celica retired from engine failure on its second lap. At the Nürburgring round supporting the Eifelrennen skipping the previous round also at the same track, it retired after four laps. Skipping the next round at AVUS to prepare for the 1000 km Nürburgring, Stommelen partnered with Ertl.

They had shown themselves to be almost as fast as the Porsche 935s, reaching speeds of 310 km/h, allowing them to qualify sixth, technical defects forced them to retire in both 500 km heats. A broken spark plug connector at the second heat forced their retirement. The Porsches occupied the top five positions. Returning for the following round at Mainz Finthen, they finished eighth behind seven 935s (the highest finishing non-935 in the race).

Josef Schnitzer was involved in a road accident en route to a DRM round at Zolder, dying two weeks later from his injuries at the age of 37. After the Celica failed to complete a single lap, Sepp, the other Schnitzer brother, pulled the plug on the project and exclusively campaigned BMWs with greater successes.

== Japan ==
Schnitzer were keen to offload the car at season's end, Nobuhide Tachi saw an opportunity for the newly enacted Fuji Super Silhouette series for Gr. 5 cars. His then privateer team (TOM'S, a tuning house) was the leading representative for Toyota and thus, the car was sold to him at a low price and thus brought over to Japan. The other Celica, missing its engine, was sold to Lipp from Rosenheim, a Toyota dealer.

At its inaugural round, he and Haruto Yanagida (of Central 20 with his Nissan Violet) were the only drivers to field Gr. 5 cars amongst the Mazda RX-3s that overran the Fuji Super Touring series in prior seasons.

The car's unresolved issues of its German career were discovered in season's progress. Schnitzer had placed the bell housing in between the engine and gearbox, moving the gearbox back, and extending the driveshaft in order to improve the front-to-rear weight distribution, causing issues with its layout. Tachi thus altered the layout by connecting the gearbox and engine and shortening the drive shaft, returning it to the original production layout. The Celica was also plagued with the chassis's lack of rigidity in the space frame and suffered from poor drivability due to an uncontrollable turbo. As a result, this effort was rewarded with a victory in its third race. Despite this, the team lacked the strength of works support Nissan had, who went on to dominate the series through to its end.

Dome had taken interest in the Celica's 152E engine at season's progress. As Tachi was unhappy with his experience of the car and wanting a domestic produced car, Dome developed a steel tubeframe chassis around the body of the RA40 Celica. It retained the same turbocharged engine of its predecessor. Though intended to replace the RA20 in the series, the car was built with Le Mans in mind.

Dome also built the nimble TE71 based Corolla G5 for TOM's to specifically race at Macau, powered by the naturally aspirated version of that engine on an aluminium monocoque chassis. Unfortunately, this car proved itself to be underpowered in the single class series, dominated by 500ps turbocharged cars. The two Dome produced Toyotas formed a long collaboration.

The now redundant RA20 was later sold to Trust Japan in 1981, which then later reverted the front nose back to the original Schnitzer version configuration. Under Kaoru Hoshino, it retired on its first round at Fuji, then finished ninth, six laps behind the winning Nissan Bluebird of Yanagida. Subsequently, it finished third and then eighth.

In 1982, Hoshino retired in his next two races with the car after five and four laps respectively at Fuji. In its final round at Tsukuba Circuit, driven by Tatsuhiko Kaneumi, it finished fifth. The following year, the Schnitzer Celica was retired in favour of the newly acquired Porsche 956 to compete in the newly introduced All Japan Endurance Championship. The Celica resurfaced again for its final appearance again at the same final round at Tsukuba, managing to finish ninth.

Since the car was sold off, prior to the collapse of the super silhouette series in 1984, very little is known of its history. Nothing was heard of the car until it was discovered in the 2000s in a junkyard in Japan in a neglected state with its Trust color scheme.

== Models ==
Despite its limited success in the series in spite of its claim it "won the German National Championship in 1977" printed on its catalogue and its subsequent editions, the DRM liftback was immortalised in several different versions.

Tamiya released static plastic model kits in both 1/20 and 1/24 scale, and the 1/24 version was re-released several times until the late 2000s.

Tamiya also produced two different radio controlled car kits. The initial 1/12 scale version was released in 1977, followed by a bigger 1/10 scale version with polycarbonate body in 2012.

Bburago made a 1/24 scale toy model with metal body.

In 2003, slotcar manufacturer MRRC produced a 1/32 scale slotcar in different liveries, including a black colored fantasy "GSR" livery as a promotional item for the Spanish Guia Slot Racing Magazine.
