= MK-Motorsport =

German car tuning manufacturer

MK-Motorsport Krankenberg GmbH
- Company type: Public
- Industry: Automotive
- Founded: 1978
- Headquarters: Rastatt, Germany
- Key people: Michael Krankenberg
- Products: Automobiles
- Website: www.mk-motorsport.de

MK-Motorsport Krankenberg GmbH is a German car tuning manufacturer specialising in BMW cars. MK-Motorsport was founded by Michael Krankenberg in 1978. They are based in Rastatt in south-western part of Germany close to the French border. All MK products are exclusive own developments and constructions emphasizing the individuality of BMW cars.

MK-Motorsport is very closely linked to the car race sportive engagement of MK-Motorsport owner and General Manager Michael Krankenberg, having an experience in car race sport about 30 years. Among other victories he can look back to victory in group B of the 24 Hours of Le Mans in 1986, successful participation in sports car world championships 1983 till 1986 and at the DRM in 1978 and 1979.

MK-Motorsport was engaged as a team: 3rd total rank at the 24 hours race at Nürburgring out of 200 participants, sole victory of a completely private team against the work teams of BMW, Mercedes-Benz, Opel and Ford in the DTM. In 1992, most successful team of DTT (Deutsche Tourenwagen Trophäe) up to 2.500 ccm. Since 1991, Michael Krankenberg has been reactivated as racing driver. Until now, 12 first places participating in sprint and long-distance races.

Michael Krankenberg died on 14.04.2008 after an accident.
