= Nissan LM04C =

Group C race car developed by Le Mans Garage

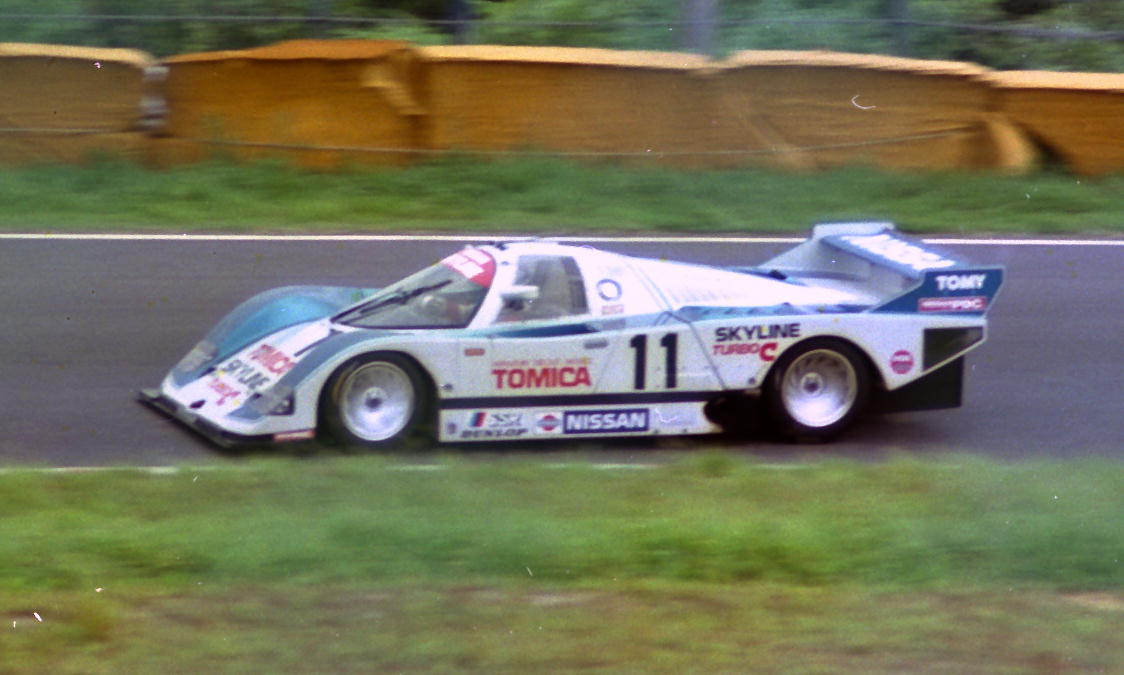
At the 1984 Suzuka 1000km race

The Nissan LM04C is a Group C race car developed by Le Mans Garage (now Le Mans Co., Ltd.) for the 1984 All Japan Endurance Championship (later JSPC) and Fuji Long Distance Series (Fuji LD).

== Overview ==
This is the company's second Group C car. The engine was initially Nissan's 2.1L in-line 4-cylinder turbo LZ20B type, and later it came to be equipped with the FJ20 type.

Three cars were produced; car No. 1 was purchased by UPI Corporation, car No. 2 by Hasemi Motorsport, and car No. 3 by Nissan for testing the FJ20 engine.

The debut race was the 1984 All Japan Endurance Opening Round Suzuka 500km. 1985 Round 2 Fuji 1000km was his last race. His highest finish was 4th place in the 1984 Fuji 1000km (Hasemi car). The reliability of the engine was significantly inferior, and the rigidity of the chassis was also low, so it was not possible to achieve good results.

Although it was a complete prototype racing car, the Hasemi car was entered under the name of "Skyline Turbo C Tomica", and the Central 20 used only in the beginning of 1985 under the name of "Fairlady ZC Canon".
