= Schnitzer Motorsport =

German auto racing team

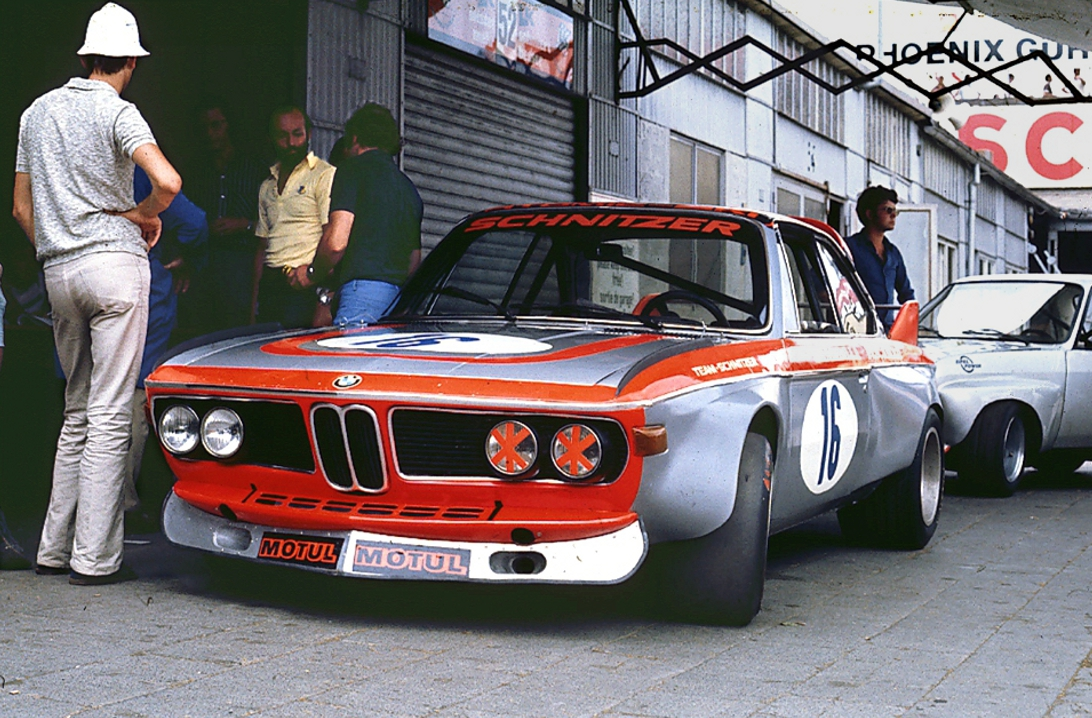
BMW Schnitzer CSL 1973

Schnitzer Motorsport was a motorsport team based in Freilassing near Munich, Germany. From the early days of its establishment in 1967, the team mostly operated an automobile racing squad for BMW, and had remarkable results in touring car and sports car racing. The team would often run the cars for BMW under the name of "BMW Motorsport". In 2012, the team operated the DTM team for BMW under the name of "BMW Team Schnitzer".

On 4 December 2020, BMW announced that it would terminate its relationship with Schnitzer Motorsport after more than 50 years.

== History ==
The team was founded in 1967 by the brothers Josef (August 7, 1939 – August 31, 1978) and Herbert Schnitzer (June 5, 1941 – June 5, 2026). Their stepfather Karl Lamm had a car repair shop and dealer business. The brothers started racing in 1962, and Josef Schnitzer won the 1966 German Championship in a BMW 2000ti. In 1968, both retired from active race driving to focus on the business and the race team.

In the 1970s, the Schnitzer's younger half-brothers Karl ("Charly") and Dieter Lamm joined the team, with Charly Lamm acting as team manager at the race tracks. In 1978, Josef Schnitzer died in an accident, and Herbert Schnitzer remained as the boss.

Apart from having the BMW dealership and Motorsport team based in Southern Germany's Bavaria, they also owned a BMW tuning specialist concern in the far north near the border of Belgium and the Netherlands, in Aachen. As this city has the license plate code AC, they called this branch AC Schnitzer.

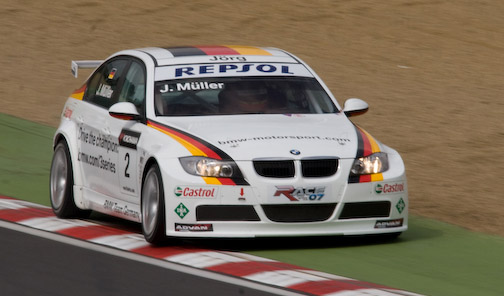
In the 2000s, Schnitzer Motorsport competed in the European Touring Car Championship (ETCC) and World Touring Car Championship (WTCC) as a BMW squad, BMW Team Germany.

Since the 1960s, the Schnitzer team was mainly active with BMW and BMW M cars in Touring car racing, namely in the European Touring Car Championship, the Deutsche Rennsport Meisterschaft, the Deutsche Tourenwagen Meisterschaft and the World Touring Car Championship (WTCC).

In 1977 and 1978, Schnitzer tried to take on the mighty Porsche 935 in the DRM. They developed a Group 5, 560 PS (412 kW) turbocharged silhouette version of the RA40 Toyota Celica and raced it with modest success. The best finish of the Celica LB Turbo was a fourth at Nürburgring in 1977, but with dismal reliability the next year Schnitzer withdrew and returned their focus to BMWs.

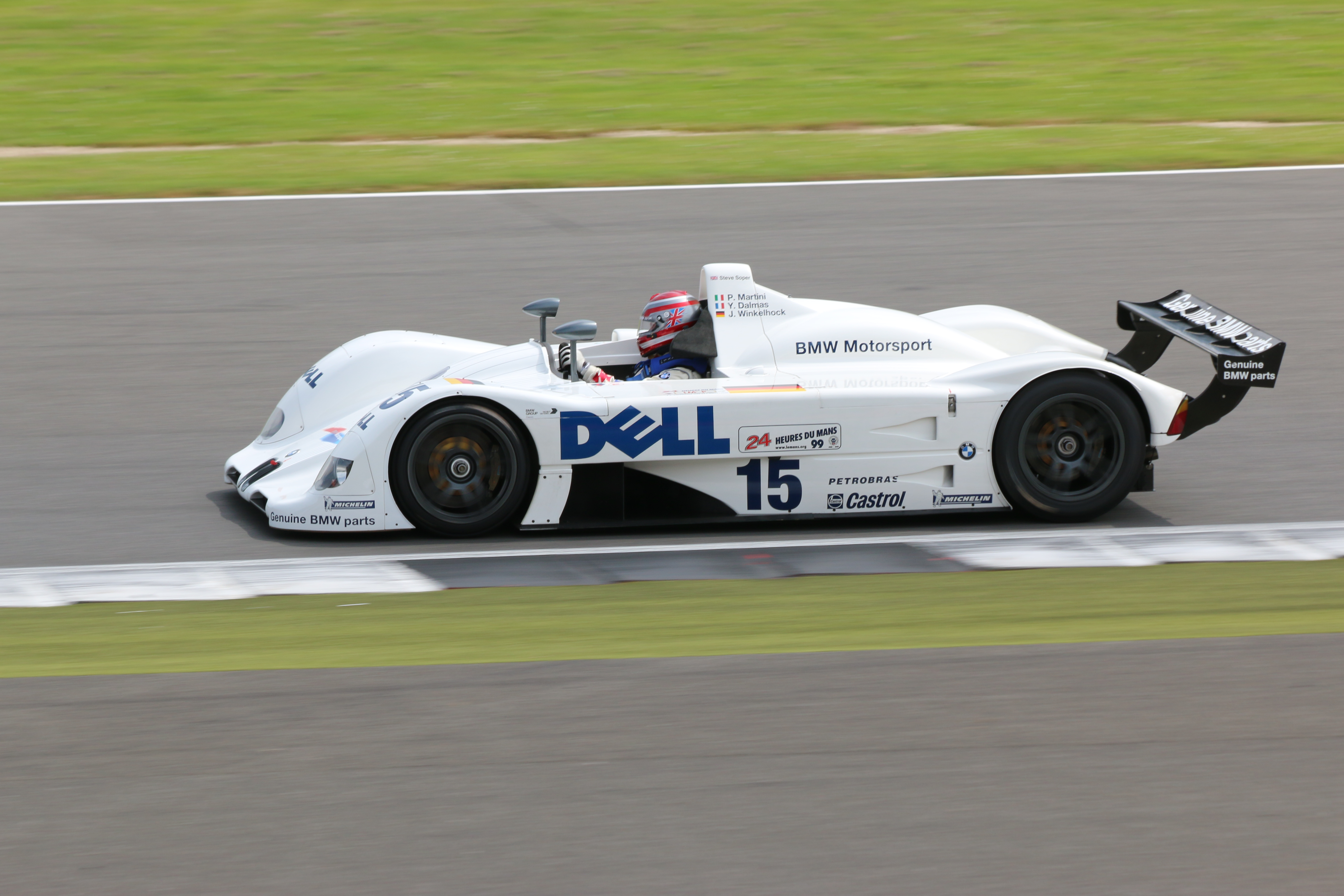
Schnitzer's BMW V12 LMR.

Joachim Winkelhock, Pierluigi Martini and Yannick Dalmas won the 1999 24 Hours of Le Mans for Team BMW Motorsport in a BMW V12 LMR, operated by Schnitzer Motorsport.

In the 2000s, they mainly competed as "BMW Team Germany" in the WTCC with drivers Jörg Müller, Dirk Müller, and Augusto Farfus from 2005 to 2009.

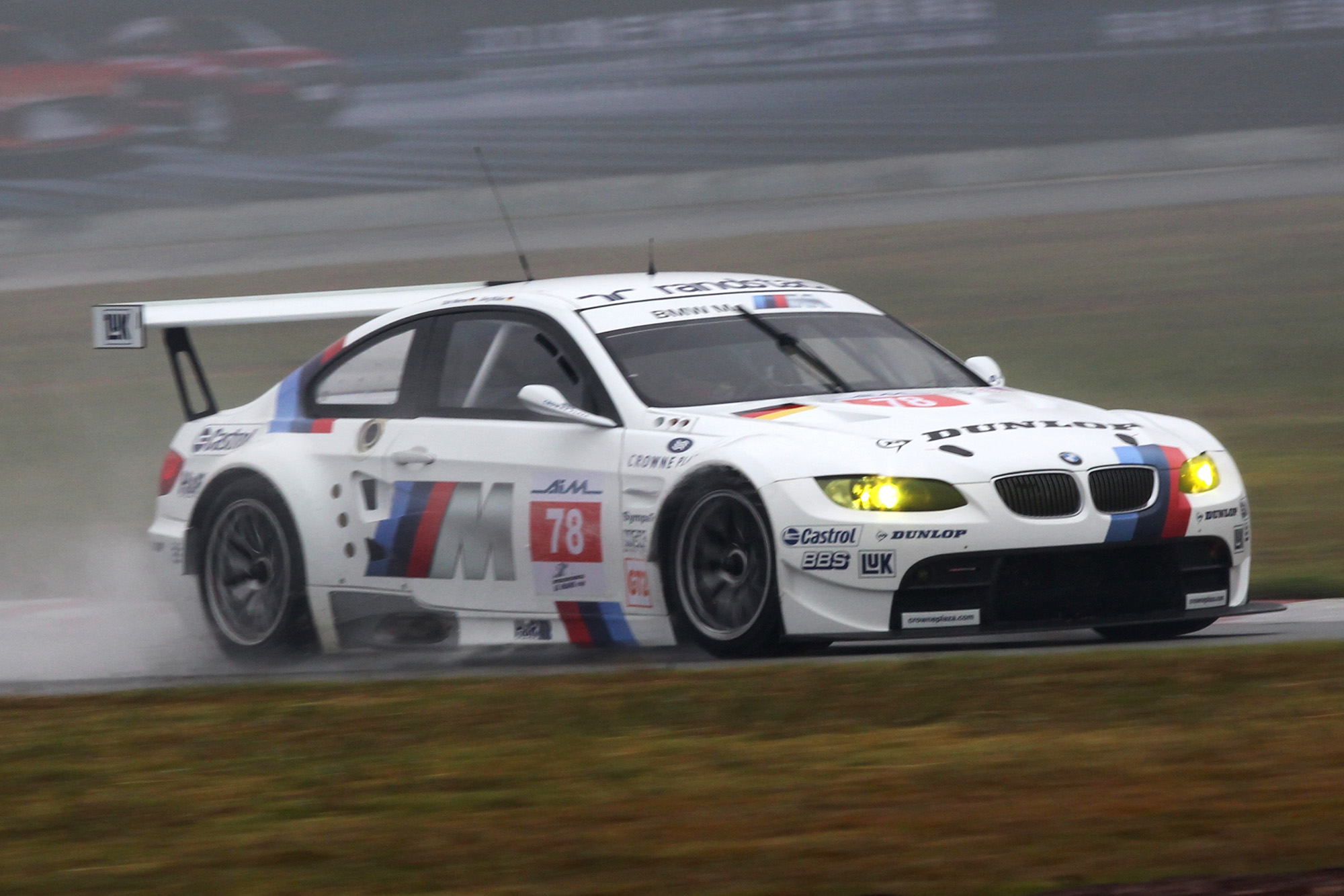
Schnitzer's BMW M3 GT2 at the 2010 1000 km of Zhuhai.

Schnitzer was also active in Sports car racing and Endurance racing, e.g. the ALMS and Le Mans Series. On 26 January 2011 it was announced that Schnitzer Motorsport, under the name Team Schnitzer, would run Andy Priaulx's GT2 M3 in the 2011 Intercontinental Le Mans Cup.

In 2012, BMW Team Schnitzer, along with BMW Team RBM, and Reinhold Motorsport GmbH, each line up with two BMW M3 DTM cars in the DTM.

In September 2018, Charly Lamm announced that he would step down from his role at Schnitzer at the end of the year. He died unexpectedly on 24 January 2019.

In early 2021, the organisation began the process of being liquidated.

== Major wins ==
Championships

- 1978 Deutsche Rennsport Meisterschaft (Harald Ertl, BMW 320i Turbo)
- 1983 European Touring Car Championship (Dieter Quester, BMW 635 CSi)
- 1986 European Touring Car Championship (Roberto Ravaglia, BMW 635 CSi)
- 1987 World Touring Car Championship (Roberto Ravaglia, BMW M3)
- 1988 European Touring Car Championship (Roberto Ravaglia, BMW M3)
- 1989 Deutsche Tourenwagen Meisterschaft (Roberto Ravaglia, BMW M3)
- 1989-1991 Italian Touring Car Championship (1989: Johnny Cecotto and 1990-1991: Roberto Ravaglia, BMW M3, BMW M3 Evolution)
- 1991 Nissan Mobil 500 Series (Emanuele Pirro, Joachim Winkelhock, BMW M3 Evolution)
- 1993 British Touring Car Championship (Champion: Joachim Winkelhock and Runner-up: Steve Soper, BMW 318i)
- 1994 Asia-Pacific Touring Car Championship (Joachim Winkelhock, BMW 318i)
- 1995 Japanese Touring Car Championship (Steve Soper, BMW 318is) and 1995 Super Tourenwagen Cup (Joachim Winkelhock)
- 1998 Super Tourenwagen Cup (Johnny Cecotto), BMW 320i
- 2001 American Le Mans Series GT (Jörg Müller, BMW M3 GTR V8)
- 2012 Deutsche Tourenwagen Masters (Bruno Spengler) (BMW M3 DTM)

Races

- 1976 1000km Nürburgring (Albrecht Krebs, Dieter Quester, BMW 3.5 CSL)
- 1985-1986 Spa 24 Hours (Roberto Ravaglia, Gerhard Berger, Marc Surer, Dieter Quester, Altfrid Heger, Thierry Tassin) (BMW 635 CSi)
- 1988 Spa 24 Hours (Roberto Ravaglia, Altfrid Heger, Dieter Quester) (BMW M3)
- 1988-1991 Wellington 500 (Roberto Ravaglia, Emanuele Pirro, Johnny Cecotto, Joachim Winkelhock, BMW M3, BMW M3 Evolution)
- 1990 Spa 24 Hours (Johnny Cecotto, Fabien Giroix, Markus Oestreich, BMW M3 Evolution)
- 1991 24 Hours Nürburgring (BMW M3 Evolution)
- 1992 Guia Race (1–2–3 finish, Winner: Emanuele Pirro, Runner-up: Joachim Winkelhock and Third: Roberto Ravaglia, BMW M3 Evolution)
- 1992 Pukekohe 500 (Emanuele Pirro, Joachim Winkelhock, BMW M3 Evolution)
- 1994 Guia Race (1–2 finish, Winner: Joachim Winkelhock, Runner-up: Steve Soper, BMW 318i)
- 1998 24 Hours Nürburgring (BMW 320d)
- 1999 24 Hours of Le Mans (BMW V12 LMR)
- 2004-2005 24 Hours Nürburgring (1–2 finishes two years in a row, BMW M3 GTR V8)
- 2010 24 Hours Nürburgring (Jörg Müller, Augusto Farfus, Uwe Alzen, Pedro Lamy, BMW M3 GT2)
- 2018 FIA GT World Cup (Augusto Farfus, BMW M6 GT3)

== Racing record ==
=== 24 Hours of Le Mans results ===
Year	Entrant	No.	Car	Drivers	Class	Laps	Pos.	Class Pos.
1972	(Germany) Team Schnitzer-Motul	49	BMW 2800 CS	(Switzerland) René Herzog (Germany) Hans Heyer	TS; 3.0	70	DNF	DNF
1976	(Germany) BMW Motorsport GmbH (Germany) Schnitzer Motorsport	43	BMW 3.0 CSL	(Germany) Albrecht Krebs (Belgium) Alain Peltier (Austria) Dieter Quester	Gp.5; SP	117	DNF	DNF
1997	(Germany) Team Schnitzer (Germany) BMW Motorsport	42	McLaren F1 GTR	(Finland) JJ Lehto (Brazil) Nelson Piquet (United Kingdom) Steve Soper	LMGT1	236	DNF	DNF
1997	(Germany) Team Schnitzer (Germany) BMW Motorsport	43	McLaren F1 GTR	(France) Éric Hélary (Netherlands) Peter Kox (Italy) Roberto Ravaglia	LMGT1	358	3rd	2nd
1998	(Germany) Team BMW Motorsport	1	BMW V12 LM	(Denmark) Tom Kristensen (United Kingdom) Steve Soper (Germany) Hans-Joachim Stuck	LMP1	60	DNF	DNF
1998	(Germany) Team BMW Motorsport	2	BMW V12 LM	(Venezuela) Johnny Cecotto (Italy) Pierluigi Martini (Germany) Joachim Winkelhock	LMP1	43	DNF	DNF
1999	(Germany) Team BMW Motorsport (Germany) Schnitzer Motorsport	15	BMW V12 LMR	(France) Yannick Dalmas (Italy) Pierluigi Martini (Germany) Joachim Winkelhock	LMP900	366	1st	1st
1999	(Germany) Team BMW Motorsport (Germany) Schnitzer Motorsport	17	BMW V12 LMR	(Denmark) Tom Kristensen (Finland) JJ Lehto (Germany) Jörg Müller	LMP900	304	DNF	DNF
2010	(Germany) BMW Motorsport	78	BMW M3 GT2	(Germany) Uwe Alzen (Brazil) Augusto Farfus (Germany) Jörg Müller	LMGT2	320	19th	6th
2010	(Germany) BMW Motorsport	79	BMW M3 GT2	(Germany) Dirk Müller (United Kingdom) Andy Priaulx (Germany) Dirk Werner	LMGT2	53	DNF	DNF
2011	(Germany) BMW Motorsport	55	BMW M3 GT2	(Brazil) Augusto Farfus (Germany) Jörg Müller (Germany) Dirk Werner	LMGTE Pro	276	DNF	DNF
2011	(Germany) BMW Motorsport	56	BMW M3 GT2	(United States) Joey Hand (Germany) Dirk Müller (United Kingdom) Andy Priaulx	LMGTE Pro	313	15th	3rd

=== Complete Deutsche Tourenwagen Masters results ===
(key)

Year	Entrant	Car	No	Driver	1	2	3	4	5	6	7	8	9	10	11	12	13	14	15	16	17	18	Pos	Points
2012	BMW Team Schnitzer	BMW M3 DTM	7	(Canada) Bruno Spengler	HOC; Ret	LAU; 1	BRH; 2	SPL; Ret	NOR; 3	NÜR; 1	ZAN; 6	OSC; 1	VAL; 6	HOC; 1									1st	149
2012	BMW Team Schnitzer	BMW M3 DTM	8	(Germany) Dirk Werner	HOC; 17	LAU; 19	BRH; 16	SPL; Ret	NOR; 10	NÜR; 12	ZAN; 8	OSC; 4	VAL; 9	HOC; 5									9th	29
2013	BMW Team Schnitzer	BMW M3 DTM	1	(Canada) Bruno Spengler	HOC; 5	BRH; 2	SPL; 1	LAU; 7	NOR; 6	MSC; 19	NÜR; 14	OSC; 21†	ZAN; 20	HOC; 3									3rd	82
2013	BMW Team Schnitzer	BMW M3 DTM	2	(Germany) Dirk Werner	HOC; 2	BRH; 12	SPL; 8	LAU; 13	NOR; 11	MSC; 8	NÜR; 15	OSC; 13	ZAN; 21†	HOC; 8									13th	30
2014	BMW Team Schnitzer	BMW M4 DTM	9	(Canada) Bruno Spengler	HOC; 6	OSC; 12	HUN; 3	NOR; 11	MSC; 2	SPL; 10	NÜR; 12	LAU; 15	ZAN; 16	HOC; 12									11th	42
2014	BMW Team Schnitzer	BMW M4 DTM	10	(Germany) Martin Tomczyk	HOC; 7	OSC; 9	HUN; 13	NOR; Ret	MSC; 13	SPL; 4	NÜR; 8	LAU; 8	ZAN; 3	HOC; 7									6th	49
2015	BMW Team Schnitzer	BMW M4 DTM	13	(Portugal) António Félix da Costa	HOC; 1; 13	HOC; 2; 20	LAU; 1; 19	LAU; 2; 14	NOR; 1; 12	NOR; 2; 12	ZAN; 1; 2	ZAN; 2; 1	SPL; 1; 13	SPL; 2; 10	MSC; 1; 11	MSC; 2; 22	OSC; 1; 3	OSC; 2; 4	NÜR; 1; 9	NÜR; 2; 15	HOC; 1; 11	HOC; 2; 7	11th*	79*
2015	BMW Team Schnitzer	BMW M4 DTM	77	(Germany) Martin Tomczyk	HOC; 1 Ret	HOC; 2; 4	LAU; 1; 12	LAU; 2; 11	NOR; 1; 6	NOR; 2; 11	ZAN; 1 Ret	ZAN; 2 Ret	SPL; 1 Ret	SPL; 2; 12	MSC; 1; 17	MSC; 2 Ret	OSC; 1; 8	OSC; 2; 20	NÜR; 1 WD	NÜR; 2; 9	HOC; 1; 15	HOC; 2; 10	19th	27*
2016	BMW Team Schnitzer	BMW M4 DTM	13	(Portugal) António Félix da Costa	HOC; 1; 7	HOC; 2 Ret	SPL; 1; 22	SPL; 2; 21	LAU; 1; 15	LAU; 2; 14	NOR; 1; 9	NOR; 2 DSQ	ZAN; 1; 6	ZAN; 2; 17	MSC; 1; 20	MSC; 2; 19	NÜR; 1; 20	NÜR; 2; 19	HUN; 1; 16	HUN; 2; 3	HOC; 1; 4	HOC; 2 Ret	17th	43
2016	BMW Team Schnitzer	BMW M4 DTM	100	(Germany) Martin Tomczyk	HOC; 1; 12	HOC; 2; 9	SPL; 1; 5	SPL; 2; 19	LAU; 1 Ret	LAU; 2; 18	NOR; 1; 12	NOR; 2; 10	ZAN; 1; 19	ZAN; 2; 11	MSC; 1; 21	MSC; 2; 23	NÜR; 1; 16	NÜR; 2; 12	HUN; 1; 23	HUN; 2; 9	HOC; 1; 20	HOC; 2; 10	21st	16

^{†} Driver did not finish, but completed 75% of the race distance.

== Bibliography ==
- Gustav Büsing & Uwe Mahla (2 December 2014). Die Meistermacher – Die BMW Schnitzer-Story (in German). Gruppe C Motorsport Verlag. ISBN 978-3-928540-71-1.
