= Anton Kathrein Jr. =

German billionaire businessman

- Born: 1983 or 1984 (age 41–42)
- Occupation: Businessman
- Known for: Owner and CEO of Kathrein
- Spouse: Married
- Children: 2
- Parent: Anton Kathrein Sr.

Anton Kathrein Jr. (born 1983/1984) is a German billionaire businessman. He is the owner of Kathrein-Werke KG, a German manufacturer of cables, antenna and receivers that allows cellphone signals to travel across the world. The company was originally founded in Rosenheim in 1919.

== Early life ==
Kathrein was born in Germany, the son of Anton Kathrein Sr., and grandson of Anton Kathrein, who founded the company in 1919.

== Career ==
Kathrein took charge of the company in 2012 following his father's death. His father had run the company since 1972.

As of November 2015, Forbes estimated his net worth at US$1.51 billion.

== Personal life ==
He is married, with two children, and lives near Rosenheim.
