= AC Schnitzer =

German automotive aftermarket company

- Industry: Automotive
- Founded: 1987
- Founder: Willi Kohl; Herbert Schnitzer
- Headquarters: Aachen, Germany
- Parent: Kohl Group
- Website: ac-schnitzer.de

AC Schnitzer is a third party tuning company based in Aachen, Germany, specializing in BMW and MINI cars, and BMW motorcycles.

Founded in 1987 by Willi Kohl and Herbert Schnitzer. Its range includes tuning for BMW vehicles and the Mini and Land Rover makes, and also a motorcycle arm. In addition to its customizing business, the firm's building in Aachen is home to several car firms, boutiques, and a luxury restaurant. The firm has roots with Schnitzer Motorsport, but is a completely independent company both commercially and legally. AC Schnitzer is part of the Kohl Group.

== Products ==
The core products offered by AC Schnitzer includes individual components such as chassis, custom exhaust systems, aerodynamic components, and light-alloy wheels, as well as complete vehicles and performance tuning for petrol and diesel engines.

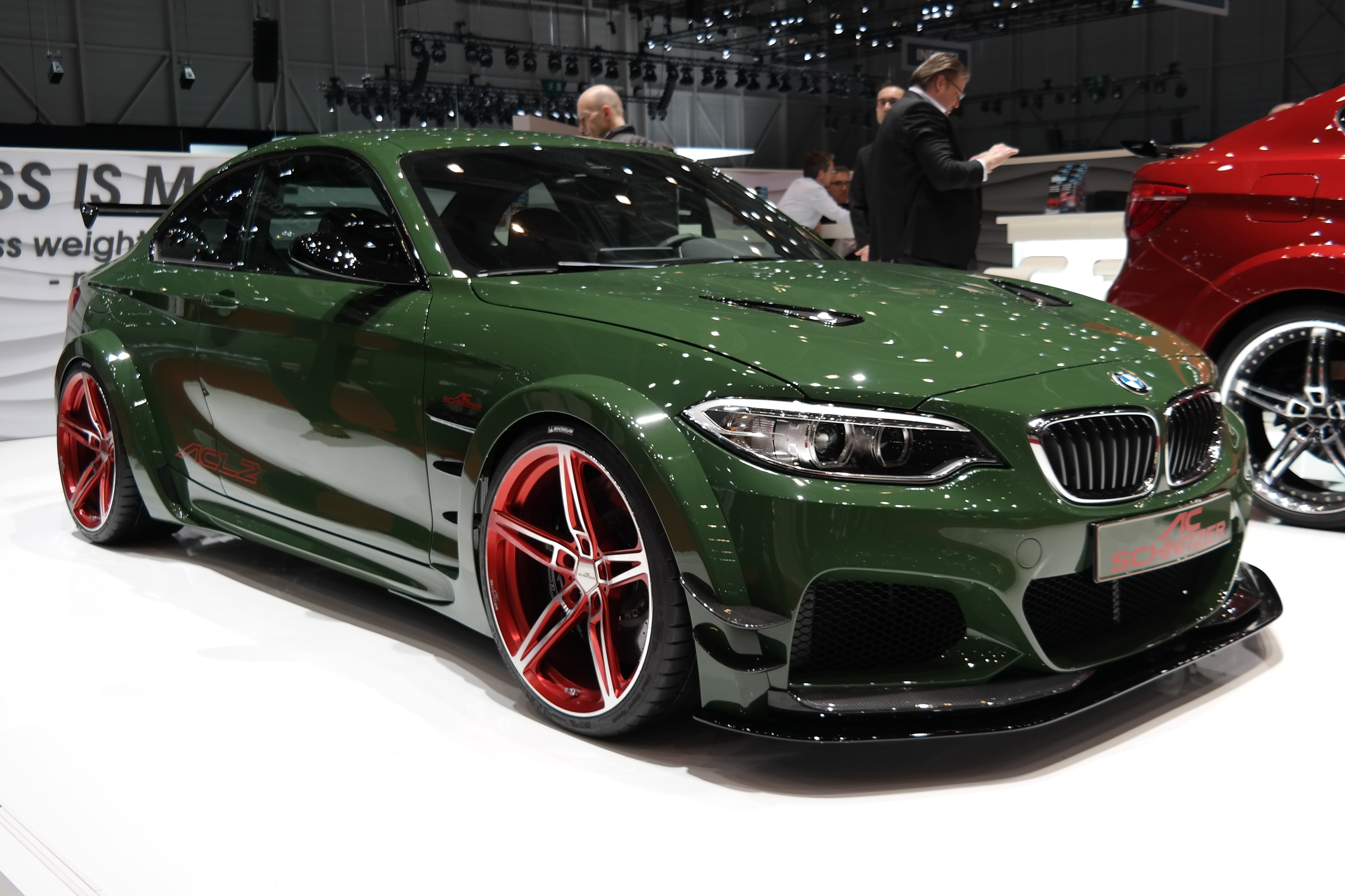
AC Schnitzer ACL2 concept at the 2016 Geneva Motor Show

AC Schnitzer also makes products for vehicle interiors using materials such as aluminium, leather or carbon fibre. The product range includes control elements such as steering wheels, pedals and hand-brake levers, or interior mouldings and cladding, as well as to customer requirements.

== Ownership Change & Continued Operations ==
AC Schnitzer was set to cease operations by 2027 due to mounting financial difficulties. However, the company was subsequently sold to Dutch holding company AM Group and will continue operating under its new ownership
