= Lotec 681 =

- Category: Group 6
- Constructor: Lotec
- Successor: Lotec M1C

Technical specifications
- Engine: BMW M88 3,453 cc (210.7 cu in) 24-valve, DOHC straight-six engine, naturally-aspirated, mid-engined
- Tyres: Dunlop

Competition history
- Notable entrants: Kurt Lotterschmid
- Notable drivers: Kurt Lotterschmid
- Debut: 1981 Interserie round 4, at the Nürburgring
| Races | Wins |
|---|---|
| 4 | 0 |
- Teams' Championships: 0
- Constructors' Championships: 0
- Drivers' Championships: 0

The Lotec 681 was a sports prototype racing car, built by Lotec in 1981. Fitted with a BMW M88 straight-six engine, the car had a reasonably successful, albeit very brief, career before it was replaced by the Lotec M1C in 1982. One car was built.

== Racing history ==
The Lotec 681 was developed by Lotec in 1981, and featured a 3.5-litre BMW M88 straight-six engine. It debuted at the fourth round of the 1981 Interserie season, held at the Nürburgring; Kurt Lotterschmid ran the car, finishing third overall, and second in the Sports 2000+ category. Lotterschmid ran the car again in the next round, at Most, but, whilst running in second place and with a lap to go, the BMW engine blew; although he was classified second for the first race, he was unable to compete in the second, preventing him from featuring in the overall classification. The series returned to the Nürburgring for the next round, and Lotterschmid took fourth overall, and third in his class. Lotterschmid finished the season by retiring from the final race, held at Zolder. Despite being reasonably successful, the car would not run again, having been made all-but-redundant by rule changes, and Lotec introduced the Group C-spec M1C for 1982.
