= Lotec Sirius =

Overview
- Manufacturer: Lotec
- Production: 2000; 1 produced

Body and chassis
- Class: Sports car (S)
- Body style: 2-door coupé
- Layout: Mid-engine, rear-wheel drive
- Doors: Butterfly

Powertrain
- Engine: 6.0 L Mercedes-Benz V12 twin-turbo
- Transmission: 6-speed manual

Dimensions
- Curb weight: 1,280 kg (2,820 lb)

The Lotec Sirius is a sports car built by German automotive company Lotec in 2000.

== Technical details ==
Only one car was produced. It had a claimed acceleration rate of 0–100 km/h (0–62 mph) in 3.8 seconds and a top speed of 430 km/h (267 mph), although figures were never verified. The engine was a twin-turbo V12 sourced from Mercedes-Benz and the chassis made of carbon fibre.

== Gallery ==
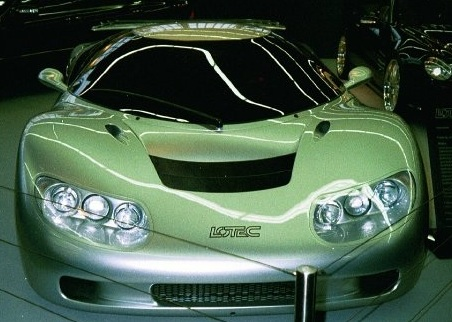
Front view, AutoRAI Amsterdam, 2003

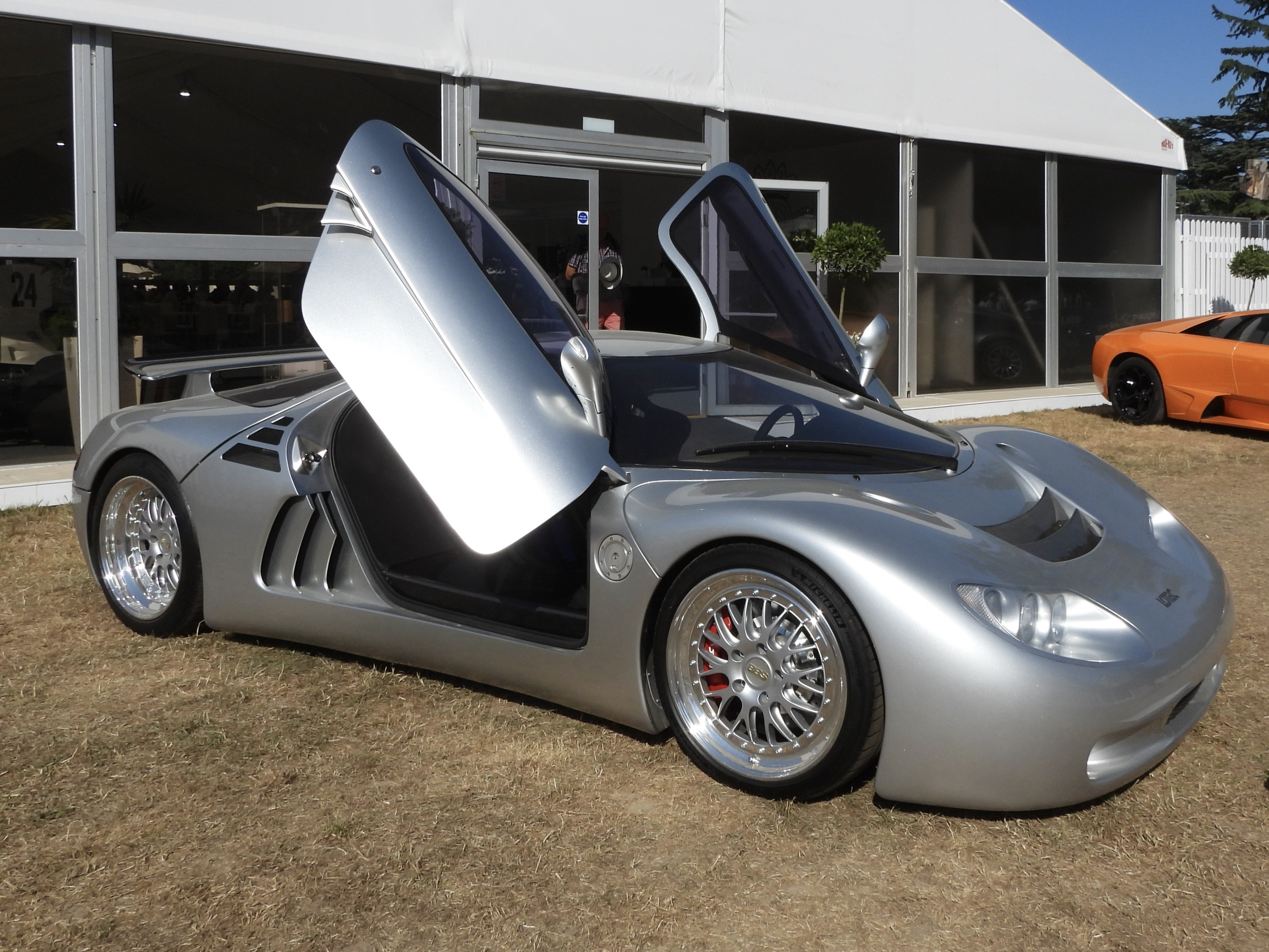
Side view, 2026 Goodwood Festival of Speed

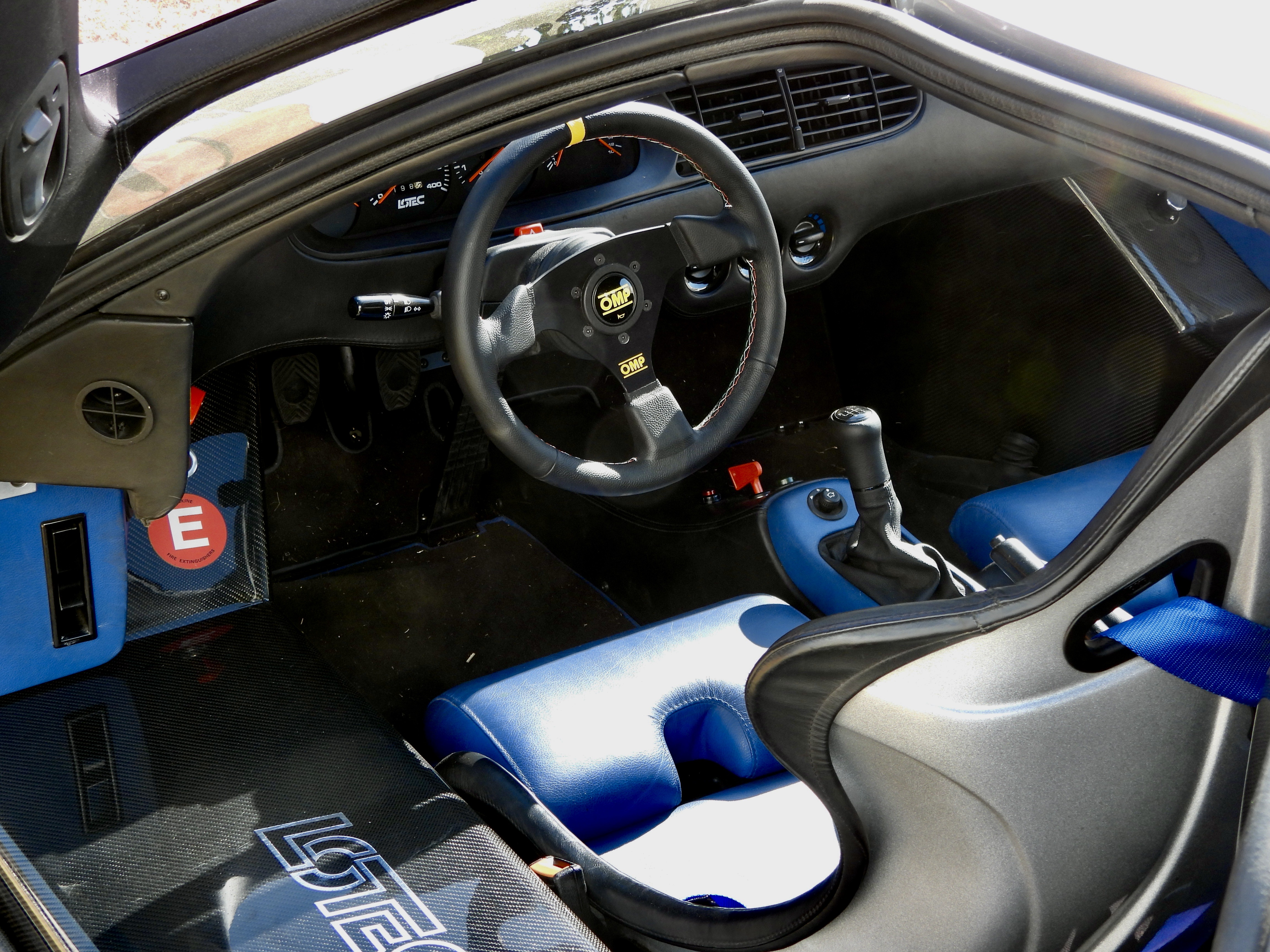
Interior, 2026 Goodwood Festival of Speed
