= Lotec M1C =

Group C Prototype race car

- Category: Group C
- Constructor: Lotec
- Designer: Gustav Brunner
- Production: 1982
- Predecessor: Lotec 681
- Successor: Lotec C302

Technical specifications
- Axle track: Front: 1,540 mm (61 in); Rear: Same as front
- Wheelbase: 2,450 mm (96 in)
- Engine: BMW M88 3,453 cc (3.5 L; 210.7 cu in) I6 N/A, 24-valve, DOHC mid-mounted, longitudinally-mounted
- Transmission: 6-speed sequential
- Power: 485 hp (492 PS; 362 kW)
- Weight: 550 kg (1,212.5 lb)
- Brakes: Girling; Front: 11 in (280 mm) X 16 in (410 mm) discs Rear: 16 in (410 mm) X 16 in (410 mm) discs
- Tyres: Dunlop; Goodyear; Yokohama

Competition history
- Notable entrants: (Japan) Auto Beaurex Motorsport
- Notable drivers: (Germany) Kurt Lotterschmid (Japan) Kazuo Mogi (Japan) Toshio Motohashi (Japan) Naoki Nagasaka (Japan) Keiichi Suzuki
- Debut: 1982 DRM Zolder round
- Last event: 1985 All Japan Endurance Fuji 500 km
Races	Wins	Podiums	Poles	F/Laps
33	0 overall 2 class	8	0	0
- Teams' Championships: 1 (1984 All Japan Endurance Championship)
- Constructors' Championships: 1 (1984 All Japan Endurance Championship)
- Drivers' Championships: 1 (1984 All Japan Endurance Championship)

The Lotec M1C is a Group C sports prototype designed, developed and built by German constructor Lotec. The car competed in championship the Deutsche Rennsport Meisterschaft and All Japan Endurance Championship. One car was built.

== Racing history ==
=== 1982–83 ===
Chassis #001 was built in 1982 based off the Lotec 681 for use in the Deutsche Rennsport Meisterschaft. Kurt Lotterschmid finished fourth and first in class (Group C) in its first race at Circuit Zolder. Lotterschmid finished sixth in the standings at seasons' end. The following year, Lotterschmid claimed the Group C-Junior championship finishing as high as fourth overall twice.

The car was sold at the conclusion of the 1983 season to the Japanese team, Auto Beaurex Motorsport. It made two appearances at Fuji Speedway at the end of the year, retiring from the 1000 km of Fuji and third at the final Fuji Long Distance Series race of 1983.

=== 1984–85 ===
In the hands of Auto Beaurex competing in the All Japan Endurance Championship, the car would have its greatest success. In 1984, Naoki Nagasaka and Keiichi Suzuki claimed the championship title by just one point over Vern Schuppan. Perhaps the car's best performance was at the World Sportscar Championship 1000 km of Fuji, where Nagasaka and Suzuki finished sixth overall and first in C2, beating many faster C1 cars through better fuel mileage.

For 1985, Kazuo Mogi and Toshio Motohashi were able to win in the C2 class at the 1000 km of Fuji, 14th overall, but the car was only able to muster a best of finish of sixth once at Suzuka Circuit. Two further ninth place finishes and retirements, first for a suspension failure and then an accident at the final race of the season at Fuji, would end up permanently finishing its racing career.
