= Lotec C1000 =

LOTEC C1000
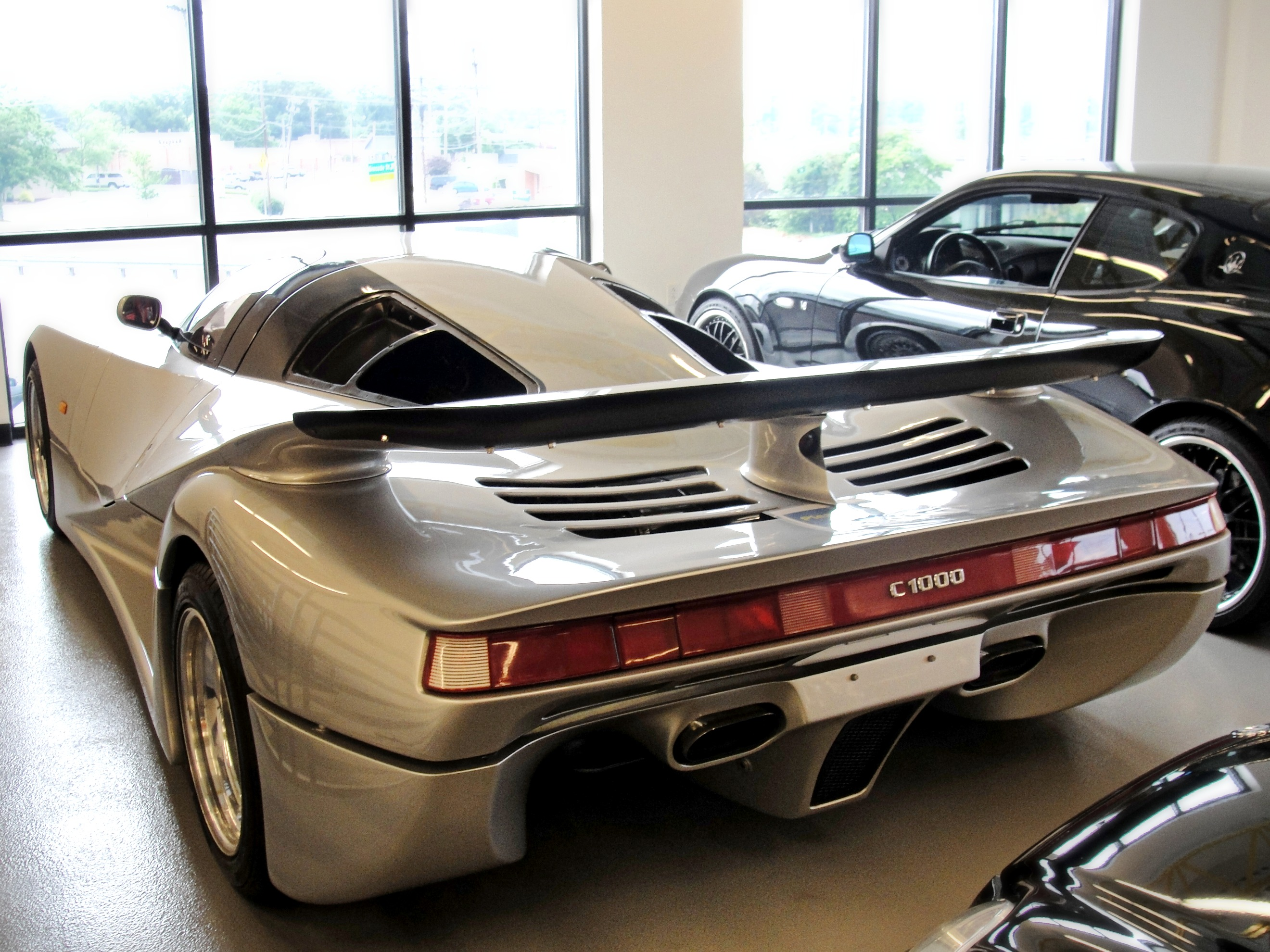

Overview
- Manufacturer: Lotec
- Production: 1995 (1 produced)

Body and chassis
- Class: Sports car (S)
- Body style: 2-door coupé
- Layout: Rear-mid engine, rear-wheel drive
- Doors: Butterfly

Powertrain
- Engine: 5.6 L V8 Garrett twin-turbos 1,000 PS (740 kW); 723 lb⋅ft (980 N⋅m)
- Transmission: Hewland 5-speed manual

Dimensions
- Length: 4,300 mm (170 in)
- Width: 2,000 mm (79 in)
- Height: 1,150 mm (45 in)
- Curb weight: 1,080 kg (2,380 lb)

The LOTEC C1000 is a one-off sports car, jointly designed, developed and built by German automotive manufacturers Lotec in collaboration with Mercedes-Benz. It was originally conceived in 1994, and constructed in 1995 by request of an Emirati oil tycoon. The 1000 in the name stood for the number of horsepower it produced. It was powered by a twin-turbocharged Mercedes-Benz M117 V8 engine, capable of producing 1,000 PS (735 kW; 986 hp), which enables it to accelerate from 0–60 mph (0–97 km/h) in 3.2 seconds, and was claimed to be able to reach a theoretical top speed of 431 km/h (268 mph). It reportedly cost LOTEC between US$2.2 and 3.6 million to develop the car.

In 2024, the LOTEC C1000 was exhibited at the Pebble Beach Concours d'Elegance in Monterey, California. It participated in the "Wedge Shaped Concept Cars and Prototypes - Late" class, winning third place.

The C1000 was a participant in the Petersen Automotive Museum's exhibit "Totally Awesome! Cars and Culture of the '80s and '90s", running from June 2025 to April 2026.
