= Nissan Skyline Turbo C =

Overview
- Manufacturer: Nissan (LeMans)
- Production: 1983
- Designer: Kazuo Mochizuki

Body and chassis
- Class: Group C race car
- Layout: Rear drive
- Chassis: Steel tubular spaceframe

Powertrain
- Engine: Nissan LZ20B, 4-stroke, petrol Twin-Turbocharged DOHC 16-valve I4
- Transmission: 5-Speed manual

Dimensions
- Wheelbase: 2,615 mm (103.0 in)
- Length: 5,065 mm (199.4 in)
- Width: 1,980 mm (78 in)
- Height: 1,239 mm (48.8 in)
- Curb weight: 1,005 kg (2,216 lb)

The Nissan Skyline Turbo C is a Group C prototype sports car developed by Garage Le Mans (currently Le Mans Co., Ltd.) for the 1983 All Japan Endurance Championship (later JSPC) and Fuji Long Distance Series (Fuji LD). While used as a marketing tool for the R30 Skyline, the Skyline Turbo C has no parts commonality or shared origin with the street car. The engine is equipped with Nissan's LZ20B type (2.1-liter in-line 4-cylinder turbo).

== Overview ==
In August 1982, apart from the Skyline Super Silhouette for sprints, Nissan's Oppama Works, Garage Le Mans (currently Le Mans Co., Ltd. ), and Tokyo R&D jointly developed the Skyline Group 5 (Silhouette Formula) for endurance racing. Although he did not participate in WEC-JAPAN as expected, on November 6, former F1 driver David Hobbs (GB), Masahiro Hasemi (J), rally in South Africa Kyalami 9 Hours Category 2 (Gr.4 and 5), which was driven by the legend Tony Pond (GB), ended up retiring due to an accident.

The following year, in 1983, Nissan asked Hoshino Racing, Central 20, and Hasemi Motorsports, which had been participating in the Sprint Super Silhouette Series with Nissan cars until the previous year, to enter the endurance race with engine supply and financial support. Unlike Toyota, which entered the endurance race collectively with TOM'S, Nissan took its own approach to each of the three teams. Hasemi Motorsports thought that the endurance Skyline Silhouette Group 5 car that went to South Africa the previous year was already a tubular frame racing machine, so it would be a good base for a genuine endurance prototype, so it was modified to meet Group C regulations. . With a truncated roof and lower ride height, a wider, longer body style, the overall shape of the car has been pushed down and the wings have been lowered and enlarged to reduce the aerodynamic profile. However, although it was adapted to the Group C regulations, it was originally a commercial car Skyline, so it became the only front-engined Group C car in the world. It is said that the cockpit was scorching due to the difficulty of heat treatment. The rubber soles of my driving shoes melt away, leaving me with stories of needing to cool my feet as soon as I get out of the car. Although he had never completed a race and did not have good results, it was more popular than Porsche due to its powerful style, and posters sold well.

The following year, 1984, Hasemi Motorsports also changed its machine to a full-fledged mid-ship Group C car, the LM 04C/Nissan. The name "Skyline Turbo C" was inherited by the LM 04C in 1984 and by the March 85G/Nissan in 1985, but both cars are pure Group C cars and have no connection with the production Skyline.

== Racing history ==
=== 1983 ===
==== 6/5 Fuji Long Distance Series Rd.1 Fuji 500km ====
The car number is 11. FLDS Class D. In this debut race, he overtook the Porsche 956 of Trust at the start and took the lead, and although he maintained his position until the hairpin, he was robbed of the lead by the time he returned to the control line, and was not recorded as the LAP leader. . The drivers are Masahiro Hasemi and Kenji Tohira. Crashed on lap 43 and retired due to a suspension accident.

==== 7/24 Fuji Long Distance Series Rd.2 Fuji 1000km ====
The car number is 11 [5] [6] . FLDS Class D. Taking the lead instead of Porsche, which had to make an emergency pit stop due to minor trouble, and became the first domestic Group C car LAP leader. 139 laps Engine overheat trouble, retired.

==== 8/28 All Japan Endurance Championship Rd.2 Suzuka 1000km ====
The car number is 11. Gr.C class. Retired after 106 laps.

==== 10/2 All Japan Endurance Championship Rd.3, WEC Rd.6 WEC-JAPAN ====
The car number is 10. Gr.C class. Fuji Speedway. Rothmans Porsche 956 and Sauber C7 BMW will participate in this race, which also serves as the World Sports Car Championship. A Mazda 717C, an Aruba AR2, a Rotec M1C BMW, and two MCS cars from the lower Group C Junior class also participated. After this race, Hasemi Motorsports installed noticeable filler panels on the left and right doors, which were left unmodified with the Group 5 remnants, to fill the gaps between the front and rear overfenders of the bottleneck. 16th in qualifying. Retired after 88 laps with an oil leak.

==== 11/27 Fuji Long Distance Series Rd.3 Fuji 500 miles ====
The car number is 11. FLDS Class D. 29 laps Engine overheat trouble. retired.
