= Kathrein =

German manufacturing company

Kathrein-Werke KG is a German manufacturer of antenna systems and related electronics. The company was founded in Rosenheim (Upper Bavaria) in 1919 and is still headquartered there.

It is the world's oldest and largest antenna manufacturer, valued at about $1.8 billion in 2015. The company is headed by the German billionaire Anton Kathrein Jr. who ascended to the CEO position in 2012 following the death of his father Anton Kathrein.

Kathrein produces antennas for GSM and UMTS mobile radio towers and for various car manufacturers such as BMW. Most satellite receivers and satellite parabolic antennas for radio and television reception are developed and partly produced by Kathrein in Germany. Many radio and television antenna towers in Germany (the ones with red and white striped tips) are equipped with Kathrein antennas. The corresponding transmitters usually are supplied by Rohde & Schwarz.

In February 2019 it became known that the core business with mobile phone antennas and filters would be sold to the Swedish network supplier Ericsson.
