= MCS Guppy =

Japanese racing car

- Category: Group C2
- Constructor: Mooncraft
- Designer(s): Takuya Yura

Technical specifications
- Chassis: Aluminum
- Suspension (front): Double wishbone
- Suspension (rear): Same as front
- Engine: Toyota 18R-G 2,200 cc I4; BMW M12/7 1,991 cc I4; Mazda Mazda RE13B 1,308 cc 2-rotor Toyota 4T-GT 2,100 cc turbocharged I4 Mid-engined, longitudinally mounted
- Transmission: Hewland FT200/FG400 5-speed manual
- Weight: Less than 700 kg (1,543 lb)
- Tyres: Bridgestone, Dunlop, Yokohama

Competition history
- Notable entrants: Team Taku; Misaki Speed; Panasport Japan; Alpha Cubic Racing Team; Mishima Auto Racing; Team Iwaki; Shimegi Racing Team; Mr S Racing Product; Oz Racing; Ba-Tsu Racing Team; Unicorn Racing; Cactus Racing
- Notable drivers: (Japan) Yoshimi Katayama; (Japan) Kiyoshi Misaki; (Japan) Toshio Suzuki; (Japan) Aguri Suzuki; (Japan) Noritake Takahara; (Japan) Seiichi Sodeyama
- Debut: 1983 1000 km Fuji
- Last season: 1988 500 km Suzuka
Races	Wins	Poles	F/Laps
28	3	0	0
- Constructors' Championships: 0
- Drivers' Championships: 0

The MCS Guppy (Japanese: MCS・グッピー, Hepburn: MCS Guppī) is a Group C2 sports prototype racing car introduced by Mooncraft in 1983.

== Specifications ==
The Guppy's basic design is based on various Group 6 cars constructed by March Engineering for the Fuji Grand Champion Series; Mooncraft describes the vehicle as essentially a closed-body version of their MCS series of racing cars used in the Fuji Grand Champion Series. The vehicle's monocoque, like many other Mooncraft creations, is of a twin-tube aluminum design. While the monocoque is of a similar design to that of most March Group 6 cars, it has been heavily modified to comply with Group C2 regulations. When other teams got their Guppies, they would sometimes modify the monocoque itself to their own specifications.

The car's windscreen is reused from the Mazda 717C, another Group C2 car built by Mooncraft. Teams may choose whatever engine they please for use in the Guppy; most engines installed in the various Guppies used in racing are engines that had been used previously in the Grand Champion series due to the car's rear frame and suspension design. These engines include the Toyota 18R-G, Mazda RE13B and BMW M12/7 engines. No matter the engine, the Guppy used a 5-speed Hewland manual transmission of either the FT200 or FG400 type.

Ballast was installed to weigh down the car as it was lighter than the 700 kg (1,543 lb) requirements for Group C.

== Development and racing history ==
The Guppy was developed in 1979 as a cheap, low-cost Group C race car. The vehicle was developed using parts of previous Fuji Grand Champion Series cars that were no longer used to reduce cost; the vehicle was advertised as "the world's cheapest Group C car". The car was given the MCS (Mooncraft Special) designation due to its relation to the older MCS Grand Champion cars.

The Guppy's first race was at the 1983 1000 km Fuji. Two Guppies were entered: one driven by Toshio Suzuki and Toshio Motohashi and another driven by Taku Akaike and Yoshimi Katayama; they finished second and third respectively, behind Vern Schuppan and Naohiro Fujita's Trust Racing Porsche 956; this result equated to the Guppy scoring a class victory in its first race.

In their first season, the Guppies failed to finish fairly frequently, with three of the races having at least one Guppy retiring. The Guppy would score two overall victories in 1984; following these victories, results were scarce for the Guppies, with only a single podium in the remaining years the Guppies competed and more retirements than finishes. When the Guppy did finish however it was usually in a non-scoring position.

The last race a Guppy would participate in would be the 1988 500 km Suzuka; Unicorn Racing's Guppy, driven by Masami Shirai and Shunji Abe, would participate in this race but failed to finish due to a crash. The last time a Guppy would be entered in a race was the Fuji 500 Miles the same year, the fourth race of the All Japan Sports Prototype Car Endurance Championship. Cactus Racing, having replaced their Mazda RX-7 they had used in previous rounds, would attempt to qualify at this race in a Guppy but failed. By this stage, the Guppy was severely outdated with many teams having upgraded to Group C1 machinery. Despite the vehicle's performance in later years, the Guppy was well-liked by privateer teams due to its good balance making it easy to drive.

Two chassis are known to exist as of 2011; at least one of the chassis is maintained in working order and is often driven at historic racing events in Japan, such as the Suzuka Sound of Engine.
