= Toyota TOM'S Celica C =

Group C racing car built by Toyota

Toyota TOM'S Celica C (TOM'S 82C)
- Category: Group C sports prototype
- Constructor: Toyota; Tom's; Dome

Technical specifications
- Chassis: Aluminum twin-tube monocoque, carbon-fiber-reinforced polymer body
- Suspension (front): Double wishbone suspension, coil-spring over shock absorbers, rocker arms
- Suspension (rear): Double wishbone suspension, coil-spring over shock absorbersrocker arms
- Length: 4,428 mm (174 in)
- Width: 1,900 mm (75 in)
- Height: 1,075 mm (42 in)
- Axle track: 1,480 mm (58 in) (front); 1,450 mm (57 in) (rear)
- Wheelbase: 2,500 mm (98 in)
- Engine: Toyota 2T-G 2.0 L (2,000 cc; 122 cu in) NA I4 mid-mounted
- Transmission: Hewland DG300LM 5-speed manual
- Weight: 800 kg (1,764 lb)
- Fuel: Elf

Competition history
- Notable entrants: (Japan) Toyota Team Tom's

The Toyota TOM'S Celica C, also known as the TOM'S 82C, was a Group C sports prototype race car, designed, developed, and built by Toyota, in collaboration and partnership with TOM'S, for sports car racing, in 1982. It was based on the regular Toyota Celica car.
