= Lotec =

German sports car manufacturer

Lotec GmbH
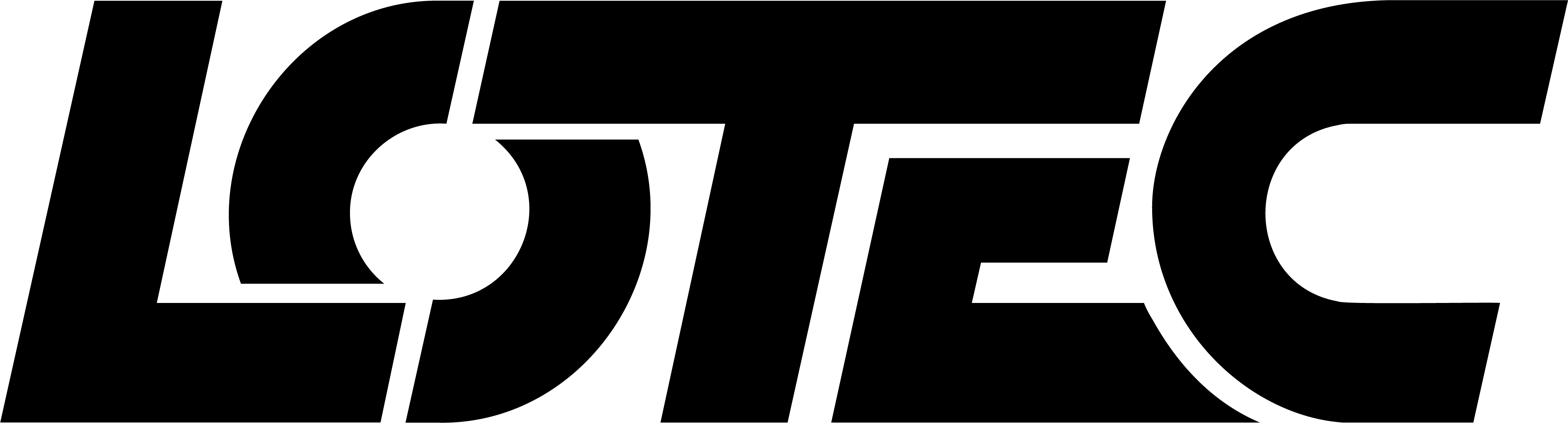
- Type: Gesellschaft mit beschränkter Haftung
- Industry: Automobiles
- Founded: 1962; 64 years ago
- Founder: Kurt Lotterschmid
- Headquarters: Kolbermoor, Germany
- Products: Sports cars, parts
- Website: loteclegacy.com

Lotec is a German sports car manufacturer, founded in 1962 by Kurt Lotterschmid.

== History ==
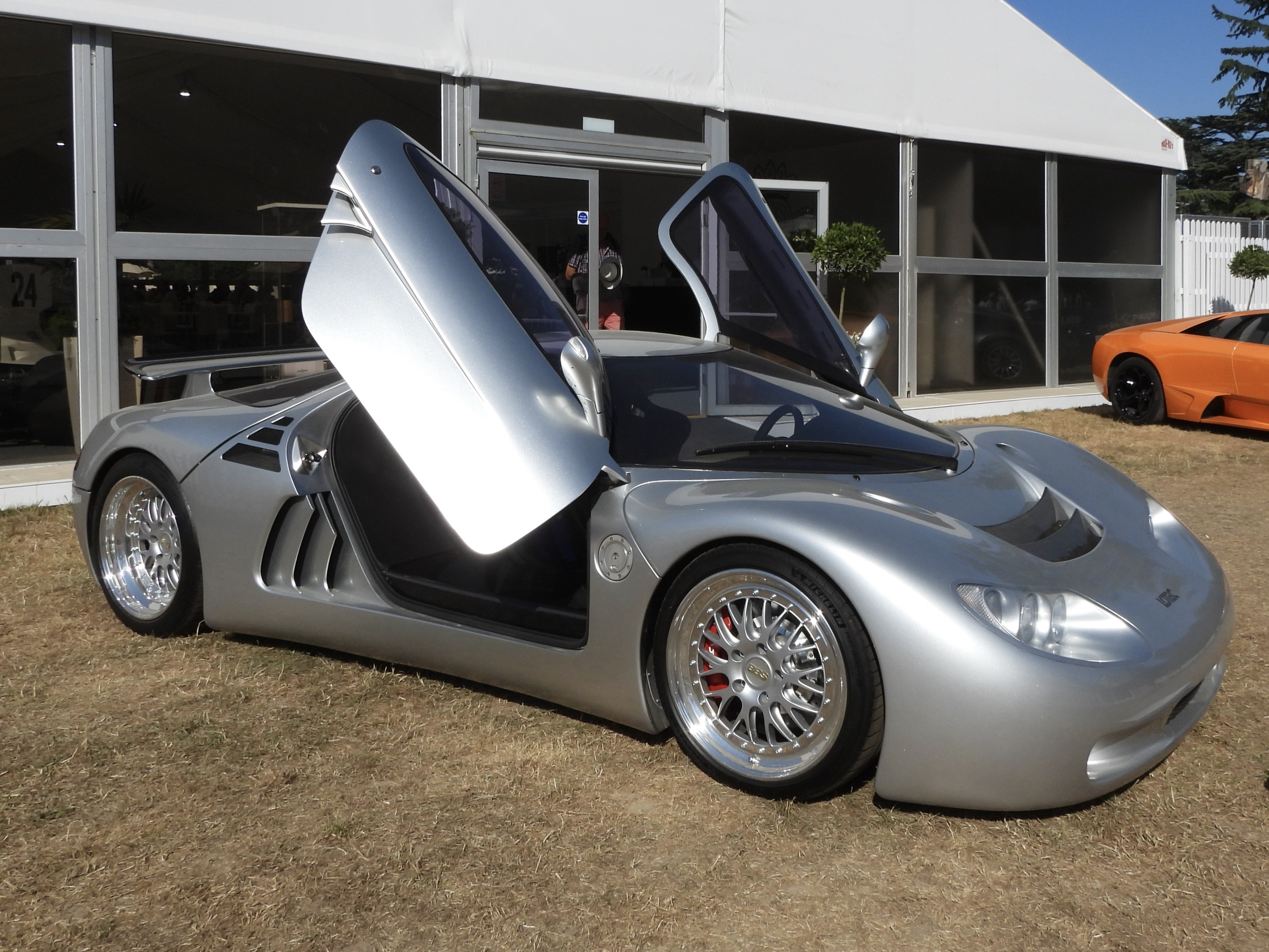
Lotec Sirius, 2026 Goodwood Festival of Speed

By 1969, the firm began building race cars, turned its attention to modifications for Porsches in 1975. In 1983, it began to create aftermarket aerodynamic and performance parts for Mercedes-Benz cars and Ferrari cars.

Lotec racing cars took part in the Group C2 category World Sportscar Championship from 1983 to 1985, an example entered by Beaurex Racing winning the Japanese Sportscar Championship in 1984, and scoring the marque's best result at the Fuji 1000km in 1984, sixth overall and first in class. The points earned placed Lotec fifth in the 1984 World Sportscar Championship for Manufacturers.

In 1990, Lotec was commissioned by an oil baron from the United Arab Emirates to build a sports car for him. The vehicle (known as the Lotec C1000) was completed in 1995, at a final price of around $3.4 million (USD). The car is equipped with a 5.6L Mercedes-Benz V8 fitted with two turbochargers for a total output of 1,000 PS (735 kW; 986 hp).

In 2000, the company completed its first production vehicle, badged the Sirius. The Sirius is powered by the same 5987cc Mercedes-Benz V12 as the Pagani Zonda. Lotec claimed that the car would produce 1000 PS, or up to 1200 PS when tuned differently. The vehicle itself is composed primarily of reinforced carbon fiber, which lends to its relatively low curb weight. However only one example was built. Lotec announced a re-designed version of the Sirius for 2009, that changes some of the body work but retains the same motor and transmission as the prototype but no example emerged.

== Car models ==
- Lotec 681, a Group 6 racing car fitted with a BMW M88 I6, built in 1981.
- Lotec M1C, a Group C racing car fitted with a BMW M88 I6, built in 1982, and raced until 1985.
- Lotec C302, a Group C racing car fitted with a BMW M88 I6 and a Ford-Cosworth DFL V8, built in 1985.
- Lotec C190, a Group C racing car fitted with a Mercedes-Benz M117 V8, built in 1990.
- Lotec C1000, a one-off sports car built in 1995 and fitted with a Mercedes-Benz M117 V8.
- Lotec 928 GT, a one-off sports car built in 1990 based on the Porsche 928.
- Lotec Colani Testa D’Oro, a one-off sports car built in 1991 based on the Ferrari Testarossa and designed by Luigi Colani.
- Lotec TT 1000, a sports car based on the Ferrari Testarossa, built in 1991.
- Lotec Sirius, a sports car built in 2000.

== See also ==
- List of German cars
- Isdera
- Sauber Motorsport
