= Nissan LM03C =

Motor vehicle

The Nissan LM03C is a Group C race car developed by Le Mans Garage (currently Le Mans Co., Ltd.) for the 1983 All Japan Endurance Championship (later JSPC) and Fuji Long Distance Series (Fuji LD).

== Overview ==
The engine is equipped with Nissan's 2.1L in-line 4-cylinder turbo LZ20B type. It is the first Group C car equipped with a Nissan engine, except for the Skyline Turbo C (front engine), which is a modification of the Skyline Silhouette Formula specification to Group C regulations . The chassis was designed by Kazuo Mochizuki of Le Mans Shokai, and the suspension was designed by Hiromitsu Mochizuki. *No siblings or relatives.

Garage Le Mans is also the first Group C car. The name "03" comes from the fact that it is the company's third generation racing machine after F2/GC chassis Thunder LM39 and Skyline Turbo C.

In 1983, the All Japan Endurance Championship started, and in order to participate in WEC-JAPAN, which started from the previous year, Nissan entered Hoshino Racing, Hasemi Motorsports, and Central 20, which were competing in the company's vehicles in Super Silhouette, with engines and each. Start entering the Group C race in the form by providing funds. The three teams will enter the endurance race with their own methods. Hoshino Racing purchased March Engineering's 83G prototype racing car, Hasemi Motorsports modified the silhouette version of the Skyline that competed in the previous year's Kyalami 9 Hours to Group C regulations, and Central 20 was made by a domestic constructor's garage Le Mans. chassis will be introduced. Nissan also cooperated in the aerodynamic design, and the company's 1/5 wind tunnel was also used.

The debut race was the 1983 Fuji 1000 km. Drivers are Haruto Yanagida / Takao Wada, and they entered in the red Coca-Cola color from Central 20. In his second race, the Suzuka 1000 km test, he crashed with a total loss. Although he entered WEC-Japan in car No. 2, he was disqualified for violating refueling regulations. The following year, 1984, won the non-title Sugo Sprint Race for the first time. At the Fuji 500 km, it became the first C-car with a Nissan engine to finish on the podium in 3rd place.

In addition, although it was a pure racing machine, it was entered under the name of "Nissan Fairlady ZC Coca-Cola". In order to create a Fairlady image, the taillights used were those of the Z31 Fairlady Z.
