= Deutsche Rennsport Meisterschaft =

German auto racing championship, 1972–1985

- Category: Sports car & touring car racing
- Country: West Germany
- Inaugural season: 1972
- Folded: 1985

Deutsche Rennsport Meisterschaft (German for German Racing Championship), formerly known as DRM, was a touring car and sports car racing series. It is regarded as a predecessor of the current DTM as Germany's top national series.

== History ==
The DRM began in 1972 as a Group 2 touring car and Group 4 GT racing series for cars like (BMW 2002) and (BMW Coupé), in addition to the Deutsche Rundstrecken-Meisterschaft (German circuit racing saloon car championship). In these years, the same or similar cars were also entered in the European Touring Car Championship.

Races were run separately as big Division 1 (for 2 to 4 liter) and small Division 2 (under 2 liter) in a sprint format.

In 1977, Group 5 cars were admitted into the series, making the series better supported with Group 5 cars than the World Championship of Makes they were intended for. These fast and spectacular turbocharged cars with wide fenders and wings were initially popular, but they were proved to be expensive with each round struggling to bring in more than 10 cars for each class during the 1978 season. At the same season, it became clear that a turbo-charged engine was a necessity to maintain competitiveness, especially in Division 2. Not even a weight increase (up 885kg from 735kg) for the 1979 season could prevent this.

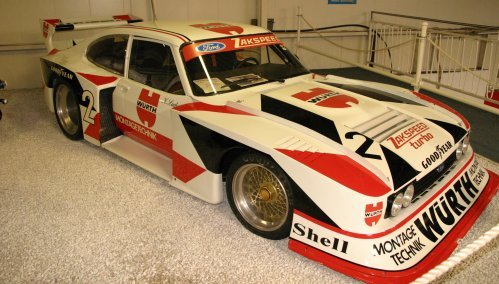
Klaus Ludwig's 1981 Group 5 Zakspeed Ford Capri at the Auto & Technik Museum in Sinsheim, Germany

In 1979, the Rennsport Trophäe (Racing Trophy) was introduced for the cheaper original series protagonists, the Group 2 and 4 cars. It consisted of combined races with the DRM until 1981.

In 1982, following the FIA rule changes, new Group C sportscars (along with existing Group 6) replaced the Group 5 machinery at the renamed International Deutsche Rennsport Meisterschaft. Meanwhile, the Rennsport Trophäe held separate races and events in 1982 and 1983, except for the 1982 ADAC Eifelrennen at the Nürburgring Nordschleife.

In 1984, with just three races held, organisers used three WEC (World Endurance Championship) races as additional IDRM point races. Also, the Rennsport Trophäe was replaced by the DPM (Deutsche Produktionswagen Meisterschaft), run with Group A cars.

1985 was the final year of the now called DSM (German: Deutsche Sportwagen Meisterschaft, lit. 'German Sportscar Championship'), with just one race was held at Norisring, the rest of them held in conjunction with the popular Interserie. This meant CanAm entered from the latter series, as it had always been, had to be counted for points

The series would be replaced by the Group C-only Supercup in 1986. At that time, the less expensive DTM (German: Deutsche Tourenwagen Meisterschaft, lit. 'German Touringcar Championship') had taken over as Germany's most important racing series.

Since 2005, the AvD the AvD organizes a "Revival Deutsche Rennsportmeisterschaft" race at the "Oldtimer Grand Prix".

== Champions ==
Season	Champion	Team	Car
1972	(Germany) Hans-Joachim Stuck	(Germany) Zakspeed Racing	Ford Capri RS
1973	(Germany) Dieter Glemser	(Germany) Zakspeed Racing	Ford Escort
1974	(Germany) Dieter Glemser	(Germany) Zakspeed Racing	Ford Escort
1975	(Germany) Hans Heyer	(Germany) Zakspeed Racing	Ford Escort
1976	(Germany) Hans Heyer	(Germany) Zakspeed Racing	Ford Escort
1977	(Germany) Rolf Stommelen	(Germany) Georg Loos	Porsche 935
1978	(Austria) Harald Ertl	(Germany) Schnitzer Motorsport	BMW 320i Turbo
1979	(Germany) Klaus Ludwig	(Germany) Kremer Racing	Porsche 935 K3
1980	(Germany) Hans Heyer	(Italy) Lancia Corse	Lancia Beta Monte Carlo Turbo
1981	(Germany) Klaus Ludwig	(Germany) Zakspeed Racing	Ford Capri Turbo
1982	(France) Bob Wollek	(Germany) Joest Racing	Porsche 936
1983	(France) Bob Wollek	(Germany) Joest Racing	Porsche 956
1984	(Germany) Stefan Bellof	(Switzerland) Brun Motorsport	Porsche 956B
1985	(Germany) Jochen Mass	(Germany) Joest Racing	Porsche 956
