= Team LeMans =

Automobile parts manufacturer and racing team

Le Mans Ltd.
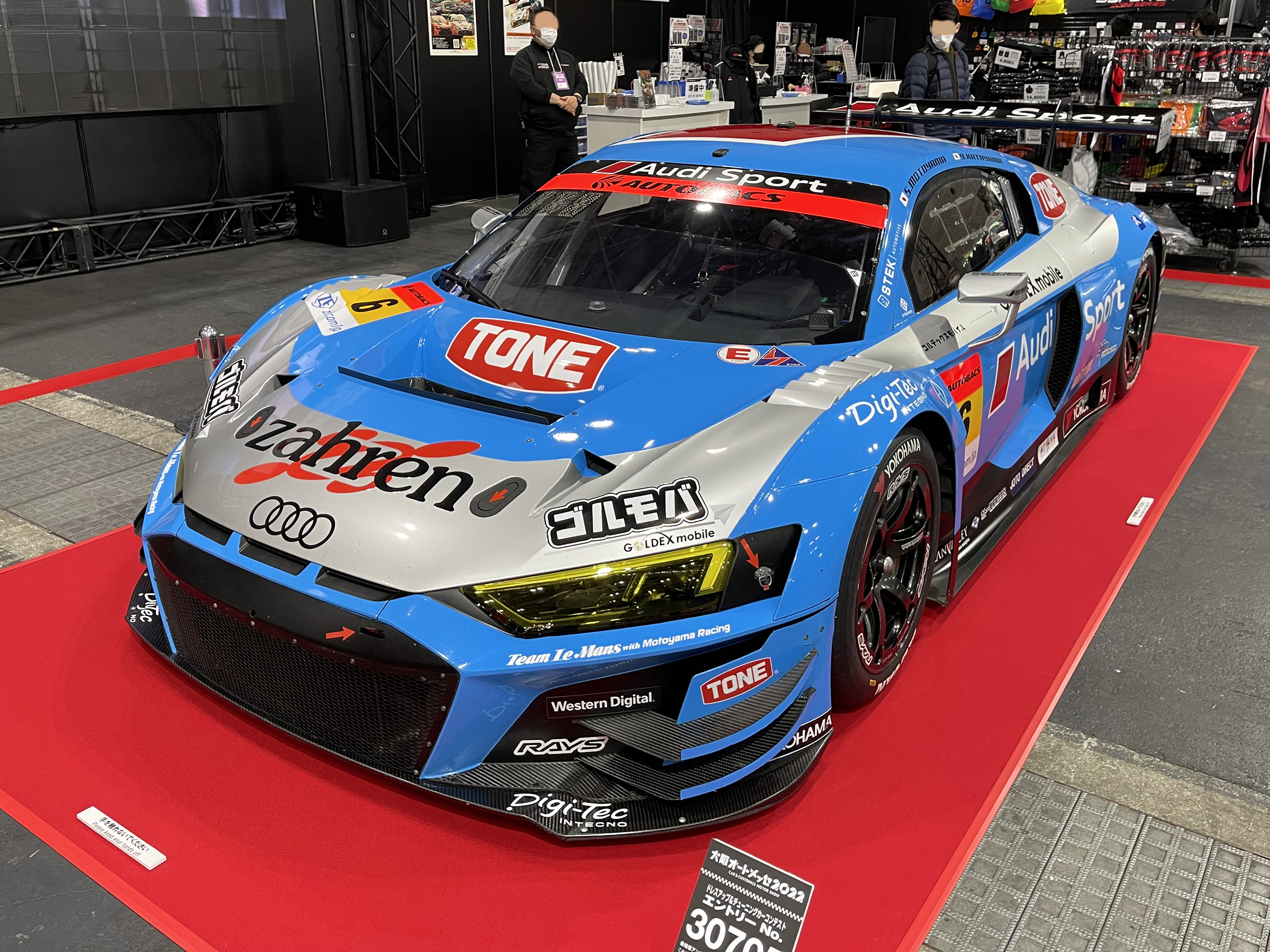
- Type: Inc.
- Founded: 1967
- Headquarters: Shibuya, Tokyo
- Website: http://www.lemans.co.jp/

(Japan) Velorex
- Founded: 1969
- Base: Gotemba, Shizuoka Prefecture
- Team principal(s): Yoshinori Katayama
- Current series: Super GT
- Former series: All-Japan Formula Three Championship; All-Japan Sports Prototype Championship; Fuji Grand Champion Series; Super Formula
- Current drivers: (Japan) Yoshiaki Katayama; (Germany) Niklas Krütten
- Teams' Championships: Super Formula: 1996, 1999
- Drivers' Championships: Super Formula: 1979: Keiji Matsumoto; 1996: Ralf Schumacher; 1998: Satoshi Motoyama; All-Japan Formula Three Championship: 1986: Akio Morimoto; Fuji Grand Champion Series: 1983: Keiji Matsumoto; 1988: Geoff Lees; 1989: Geoff Lees; Super GT: 2002: Juichi Wakisaka, Akira Iida; 2019: Kenta Yamashita, Kazuya Oshima
- Website: Team Le Mans

Le Mans Ltd., headquartered in Shibuya, Tokyo is an automobile parts manufacturer founded in 1967. The original company name was Le Mans Chamber of Commerce. The company is mainly engaged in the development and sales of motorsport parts and the import and sale of race cars overseas.

They also have a racing division called Team LeMans, currently compete under the Velorex name. The origin of the team name comes from 24 Hours of Le Mans. The team currently competes in Super GT, fielding the #6 Audi R8 LMS Evo II in the GT300 class for Yoshiaki Katayama, Roberto Merhi and Seiya Jin.

== Team LeMans ==
In 1969 Team LeMans was established as a racing department of Le Mans Chamber of Commerce. It has been active in a variety of categories since the 1970s as one of the top teams of Japan.

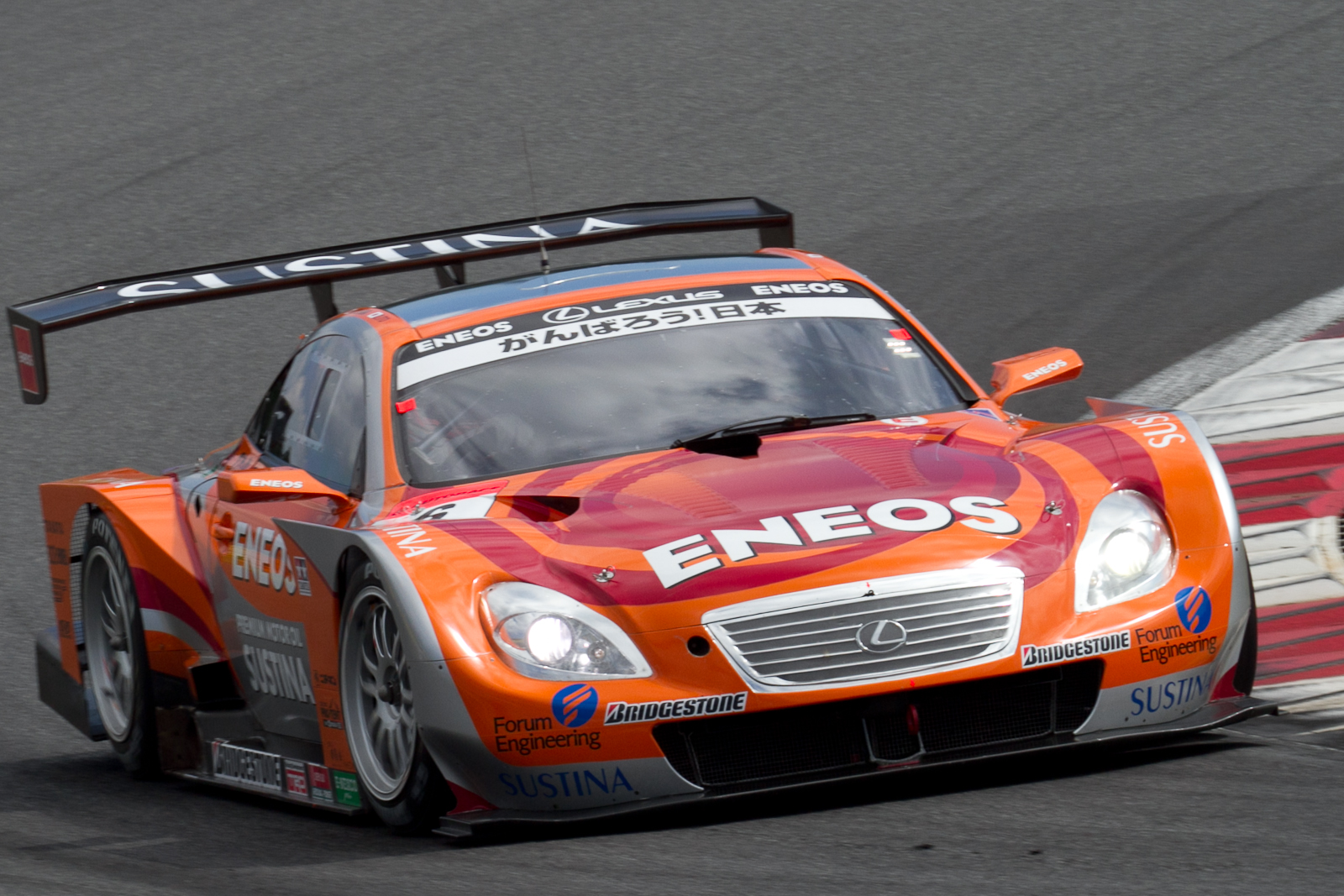
ENEOS SUSTINA SC430 (2011)

The team has competed in single-seaters since 1976, when they entered the All-Japan F2000 Championship. They served as the Japanese distributor of Reynard products until 2002. In 1991, Michael Schumacher, before his Formula One debut, raced with the team in the Sportsland SUGO round of the Japanese Formula 3000 Championship, while in 1996 his brother Ralf became the champion with the same team.

They also developed their own racing machine, that complied to Group C regulations.

In 2012 in collaboration with Hideki Noda they founded "NODA racing Academy Senior High School", several engineers such as Donuma Hiroyoshi, the team principal, have served as lecturers at the school.

== History ==
=== All-Japan F2000/F2/F3000 Championship ===
Their participation in the All Japan F2000 Championship started with Keiji Matsumoto in 1976. In 1979 he won the championship title. In 1988-89 Geoff Lees and Emanuele Pirro raced for the team, both winning one race.

=== Formula Nippon ===
In 1996, the team had its most successful year in Japan's top level open wheel series, when Ralf Schumacher and Naoki Hattori took the first two spots in the drivers' championship, also winning the first team title. The team repeated wins in the drivers and team championship with Satoshi Motoyama in 1998.

=== Fuji GC ===
The team achieved titles in The Fuji Grand Champion Series (Fuji GC) with in Keiji Matsumoto in 1983 and Geoff Lees in 1988 and 1989.

=== 24 Hours of Le Mans ===
Team LeMans first entered the 24 Hours of Le Mans in 1987 under the name Italya Sports. They competed in the race through 1990 without a single finish.

=== All-Japan GT Championship/Super GT ===
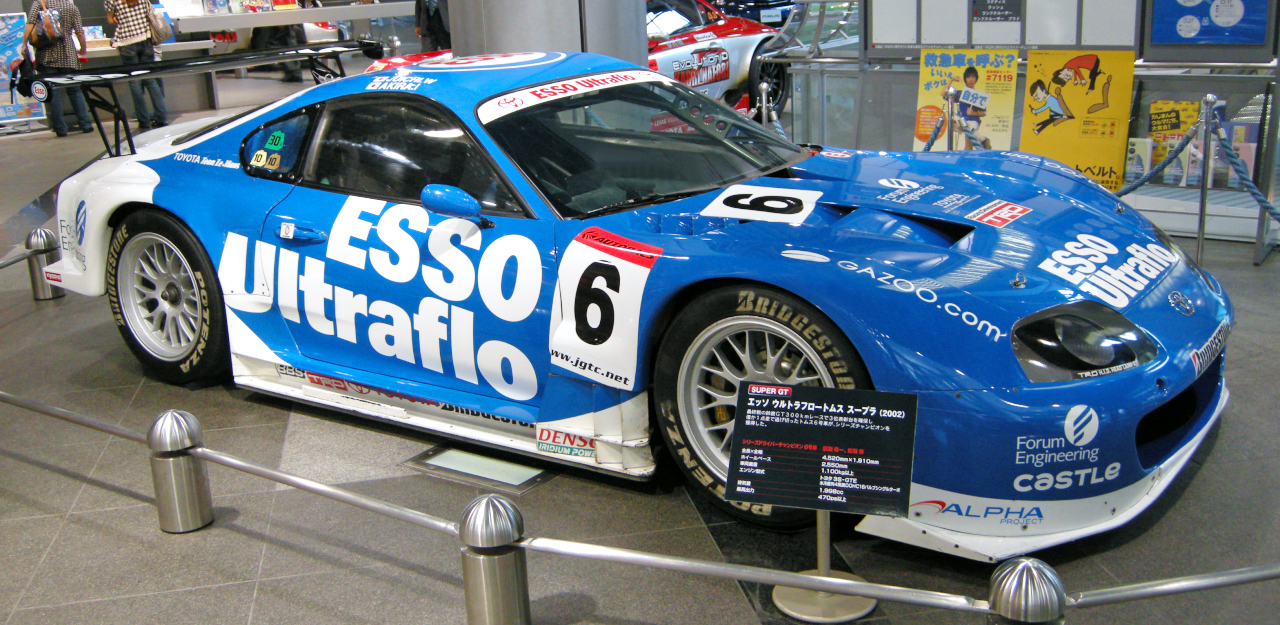
ESSO Ultraflo Supra (2002)

Team LeMans first entered the All Japan Grand Touring Car Championship on its inaugural season in 1994, fielding a production based Nissan 300ZX-LM in the GT1 class with FedEx as their primary sponsor. The team took three top-10 finishes with Masami Kageyama and finished 17th in the drivers standings. Kageyama and the 300ZX returned to compete in the following year, but the team failed to score any points and was not classified in the standings.

For the 1996 season, Team LeMans bought an ex-IMSA Nissan 300ZX-GTS to compete in the rebranded GT500 class. Kageyama and series debutant Yuji Tachikawa took one top-10 finish in the final round of the championship at Mine Circuit and finished 25th in the drivers standings. Tachikawa stayed with the team for the 1997 season and was partnered by Tsuyoshi Takahashi, who replaced Kageyama after he was signed by SARD. The team took a 10th place finish in the season opening round at Suzuka, but a practice crash in the next round at Fuji totaled their 300ZX-GTS and the team was forced to withdraw their entry for the rest of the season.

Team LeMans didn't take part in the 1998 season, but they returned in 1999 after they took over the entry of the #6 Esso Tiger Toyota Supra from Inging Motorsport. LeMans signed former Formula One driver Hideki Noda and reigning GT300 champion Shingo Tachi to compete with the team, but Tachi was killed in a pre-season testing accident at TI Aida with less than two weeks before the start of the 1999 season. Former MotoGP champion Wayne Gardner was then signed by the team to replace Tachi. The team took a pole position in the third round at Sportsland Sugo and a victory in the fifth round at Fuji Speedway on their first season with Toyota, finishing 12th in the drivers standings.

In 2002, the team won drivers' championship in the GT500 class of the All Japan Grand Touring Car Championship with Akira Iida and Juichi Wakisaka, who competed in a Toyota Supra race car. Wakisaka, as team principal, would later led Team LeMans to a second GT500 class title in 2019 with the driving pairing of Kazuya Oshima and Kenta Yamashita, but the team left the series at the conclusion of the season.

Team LeMans provided support to Hitotsuyama Racing in 2020 before they reentered the series in 2021 under a collaboration with Motoyama Racing. LeMans entered the #6 Audi R8 LMS Evo for ex-GT500 champion Satoshi Motoyama and Yoshiaki Katayama, son of the team's owner Yoshinori Katayama, in the GT300 class. The team finished all races that year, but was not classified as they failed to score a points finish. Motoyama and Katayama returned the following year with an Evo II model of the Audi R8 LMS, but Motoyama was released after one round. Financial issues on Motoyama's sponsors was reported to be the primary reason of Motoyama's dismissal. Roberto Merhi was then signed by the team to replace Motoyama for the rest of the season.

== Team LeMans Results ==
=== Complete JGTC Results ===
(key) (Races in bold indicate pole position) (Races in italics indicate fastest lap)

Year	Car	Tyres	Class	No.	Drivers	1	2	3	4	5	6	7	8	Pos	Pts
1993	Nissan R92CP	B	C1	25	(Japan) Takao Wada (Japan) Toshio Suzuki	FUJ	FUJ	SUZ; 1	FUJ					N/A	N/A
1994	Nissan Fairlady Z	B	GT1	25	(Japan) Masami Kageyama (Japan) Akira Ishikawa (United Kingdom) Richard Dean	FUJ; Ret	SEN; 9	FUJ; 11	SUG; 7	MIN; 7				10th	10
1995	Nissan Fairlady Z	Y	GT1	25	(Japan) Masami Kageyama	SUZ; 12	FUJ; DNS	SEN	FUJ; Ret	SUG; Ret	MIN; Ret			NC	0
1996	Nissan Fairlady Z	Y	GT500	25	(Japan) Masami Kageyama (Japan) Yuji Tachikawa	SUZ	FUJ; Ret	SEN; Ret	FUJ	SUG; Ret	MIN; 9			13th	2
1997	Nissan Fairlady Z	Y	GT500	75	(Japan) Yuji Tachikawa (Japan) Tsuyoshi Takahashi	SUZ; 10	FUJ; DNS	SEN	FUJ	MIN	SUG			NC	1
1999	Toyota Supra	B	GT500	6	(Australia) Wayne Gardner (Japan) Hideki Noda	SUZ; DNA	FUJ; 8	**SUG**; 16	MIN; 5	FUJ; 1	OKA; 9	MOT; 13		7th	33
2000	Toyota Supra	B	GT500	6	(Australia) Wayne Gardner (Japan) Hideki Noda	MOT; 8	FUJ; 4	SUG; 7	FUJ; 15	OKA; 7	MIN; 5	SUZ; 6		6th	35
2001	Toyota Supra	B	GT500	6	(Japan) Hideki Noda (Japan) Juichi Wakisaka	OKA; Ret	**FUJ**; 1	SUG; 5	FUJ; 3	MOT; 13	SUZ; Ret	MIN; 14		6th	40
2002	Toyota Supra	B	GT500	6	(Japan) Akira Iida (Japan) Juichi Wakisaka	OKA; 10	**FUJ**; 2	SUG; 1	SEP; 11	FUJ; 7	MOT; 4	MIN; 4	**SUZ**; 3	2nd	75
2003	Toyota Supra	B	GT500	1	(Japan) Akira Iida (Japan) Juichi Wakisaka	OKA; 1	FUJ; 12	**SUG**; 1	FUJ; 6	FUJ; 4	MOT; 4	AUT; 4	SUZ; 7	2nd	83
2004	Toyota Supra	B	GT500	6	(Japan) Akira Iida (Japan) Juichi Wakisaka	OKA; 2	**SUG**; 11	SEP; 14	TOK; 2	MOT; 2	AUT; 4	SUZ; Ret		4th	57

=== Complete Super GT Results ===
(key) (Races in bold indicate pole position) (Races in italics indicate fastest lap)

Year	Car	Tyres	Class	No.	Drivers	1	2	3	4	5	6	7	8	9	Pos	Points
2005	Toyota Supra	B	GT500	6	(Japan) Akira Iida (Japan) Juichi Wakisaka	OKA; 11	FUJ; 5	SEP; 4	SUG; 4	MOT; 9	FUJ; 3	AUT; 10	SUZ; 3		5th	51
2006	Lexus SC430	B	GT500	6	(Japan) Akira Iida (Japan) Tatsuya Kataoka (Sweden) Björn Wirdheim	SUZ; 6	OKA; 11	FUJ; 2	SEP; 14	SUG; 9	SUZ; Ret	MOT; 4	AUT; 13	FUJ; 5	11th	36
2007	Lexus SC430	B	GT500	6	(Japan) Tatsuya Kataoka (Sweden) Björn Wirdheim	SUZ; 4	OKA; 14	FUJ; 3	SEP; 9	SUG; DNS	SUZ; 9	MOT; 3	AUT; 8	FUJ; 16	9th	56
2008	Lexus SC430	B	GT500	6	(Japan) Daisuke Ito (Sweden) Björn Wirdheim (Japan) Akira Iida (Brazil) Roberto Streit	SUZ; 9	OKA; 13	FUJ; 6	SEP; 8	SUG; 7	SUZ; 6	MOT; 4	AUT; 14	FUJ; 3	8th	64
2009	Lexus SC430	B	GT500	6	(Japan) Daisuke Ito (Sweden) Björn Wirdheim	OKA; 10	SUZ; 4	FUJ; 6	SEP; 14	SUG; 5	SUZ; Ret	FUJ; 4	AUT; 10	MOT; 4	11th	54
2010	Lexus SC430	B	GT500	6	(Japan) Daisuke Ito (Sweden) Björn Wirdheim	SUZ; 2	OKA; 5	FUJ; 3	SEP; 4	SUG; 3	SUZ; 11	FUJ; C	MOT; 12		4th	70
2011	Lexus SC430	B	GT500	6	(Japan) Daisuke Ito (Japan) Kazuya Oshima	OKA; 12	FUJ; 2	SEP; 8	SUG; 5	SUZ; 8	FUJ; 10	AUT; 13	MOT; 15		10th	50
2012	Lexus SC430	B	GT500	6	(Japan) Daisuke Ito (Japan) Kazuya Oshima	OKA; 13	FUJ; 10	SEP; 3	**SUG**; 1	SUZ; Ret	FUJ; 10	AUT; 12	MOT; 12		10th	50
2013	Lexus SC430	B	GT500	6	(Japan) Kazuya Oshima (Japan) Yuji Kunimoto	OKA; 7	FUJ; 3	SEP; 7	SUG; 6	SUZ; Ret	FUJ; 4	AUT; 11	**MOT**; 1		5th	72
2014	Lexus RC F	B	GT500	6	(Japan) Kazuya Oshima (Japan) Yuji Kunimoto	**OKA**; 2	FUJ; 3	AUT; 9	SUG; 5	FUJ; 13	SUZ; 5	BUR; 9	MOT; 11		6th	62
2015	Lexus RC F	B	GT500	6	(Japan) Kazuya Oshima (Japan) Yuji Kunimoto	OKA; 9	FUJ; 9	CHA; 2	FUJ; 13	SUZ; Ret	SUG; 4	AUT; 8	MOT; 9		9th	49
2016	Lexus RC F	B	GT500	6	(Italy) Andrea Caldarelli (Japan) Kazuya Oshima	OKA; 4	FUJ; 5	**SUG**; 4	FUJ; 9	SUZ; 4	CHA; 3	MOT; 4	MOT; 2		2nd	92
2017	Lexus LC500 GT500	B	GT500	6	(Italy) Andrea Caldarelli (Japan) Kazuya Oshima	OKA; 2	FUJ; 2	AUT; 13	SUG; 3	FUJ; 9	SUZ; 7	CHA; 2	MOT; 13		3rd	82
2018	Lexus LC500 GT500	B	GT500	6	(Japan) Kazuya Oshima (Sweden) Felix Rosenqvist (United Kingdom) James Rossiter	OKA; 4	FUJ; 5	SUZ; 12	CHA; 2	FUJ; 7	SUG; 11	AUT; 9	MOT; 6		7th	65
2019	Lexus LC500 GT500	B	GT500	6	(Japan) Kazuya Oshima (Japan) Kenta Yamashita	OKA; 13	FUJ; 8	SUZ; 3	**BUR**; 1	FUJ; 1	AUT; 6	SUG; 6	MOT; 2		2nd	106
2021	Audi R8 LMS Evo	Y	GT300	6	(Japan) Yoshiaki Katayama (Japan) Satoshi Motoyama	OKA; 22	FUJ; 23	MOT; 19	SUZ; 12	SUG; 18	AUT; 24	MOT; 20	FUJ; 18		22nd	21
2022	Audi R8 LMS Evo II	Y	GT300	6	(Japan) Yoshiaki Katayama (Japan) Satoshi Motoyama (Spain) Roberto Merhi (Japan) Shintaro Kawabata	OKA; 5	FUJ; 14	SUZ; 18	FUJ; 16	SUZ; 5	SUG; 16	AUT; 20	MOT; 13		16th	31.5
2023	Audi R8 LMS Evo II	Y	GT300	6	(Japan) Yoshiaki Katayama (Spain) Roberto Merhi (Japan) Seiya Jin	OKA; 21	FUJ; 7	SUZ; 15	FUJ; 3	SUZ; Ret	SUG; 3	AUT; 15	MOT; 3		10th	55
2024	Ferrari 296 GT3	Y	GT300	6	(Japan) Yoshiaki Katayama (Spain) Roberto Merhi	OKA; 10	FUJ; 13	SUZ; 3	FUJ; 9	SUG; Ret	**AUT**; 8	MOT; 9	SUZ; 5		10th	44
2025	Ferrari 296 GT3	Y	GT300	6	(Japan) Yoshiaki Katayama (Spain) Roberto Merhi	OKA; DSQ	FUJ; 1	SEP; 13	FS1; 15	FS2; Ret	SUZ; 18	SUG; 12	AUT; 5	MOT; Ret	13th	59

^{‡} Half points awarded as less than 75% of race distance was completed. * Season still in progress.

=== All Japan Sports Prototype Championship ===
Year	Car	Drivers
1984	Nissan Skyline Turbo C (LM03C)	(Japan) Kenji Takahashi / (Japan) Osamu Nakako / (Japan) Toshio Suzuki
1985	Nissan LM04C Nissan LM05C	(Japan) Keji Matsumoto / (Japan) Osamu Nakako / (Japan) Akio Morimoto
1986	Nissan March 86G	(Japan) Keji Matsumoto / (Japan) Aguri Suzuki
1987	Nissan March 86G	(Sweden) Anders Olofsson / (Japan) Takao Wada
1988	#86 Nissan March 88G	(Sweden) Anders Olofsson / (Japan) Takao Wada
1989	#85 Nissan March 88G	(Japan) Osamu Nakako / (Japan) Akio Morimoto / (Japan) Koji Sato
1990	#85 Nissan R89C	(Japan) Osamu Nakako / (Japan) Takao Wada / (Brazil) Maurizio Sandro Sala
1991	#25 Nissan R89C #25 Nissan R90CP	(Japan) Hideki Okada / (Japan) Takao Wada (Japan) Masahiko Kageyama / (Brazil) Maurizio Sandro Sala

=== 24 Hours of Le Mans ===
Year	Entrant	No.	Tyres	Car	Drivers	Class	Laps	Pos.	Class Pos.
1987	(Japan) Italya Sports (Japan) Team LeMans	29	**Y**	Nissan R86V	(Sweden) Anders Olofsson (France) Alain Ferté (France) Patrick Gonin	Gr.C1	86	DNF	DNF
1988	(Japan) Italya Cabin (Japan) Team LeMans Co.	85	**Y**	Nissan R87S	(Japan) Toshio Suzuki (United States) Danny Ongais (France) Michel Trollé	Gr.C1	74	DNF	DNF
1988	(Japan) Italya Cabin (Japan) Team LeMans Co.	86	**Y**	Nissan R88S	(Sweden) Anders Olofsson (Italy) Lamberto Leoni (Japan) Akio Morimoto	Gr.C1	69	DNF	DNF
1989	(Japan) Team LeMans Co. (France) Courage Compétition	32	**Y**	March 88S	(Japan) Takao Wada (Japan) Akio Morimoto (Sweden) Anders Olofsson	C1	221	DNF	DNF
1990	(Japan) Team Le Mans	85	**Y**	Nissan R89C	(Japan) Takao Wada (Sweden) Anders Olofsson (Brazil) Maurizio Sandro Sala	C1	182	DNF	DNF

=== Super Formula (Formula Nippon, Japanese Formula 3000, Japanese Formula 2000) ===
Year	Team	Chassis	Engine	Drivers	Rankings
1979	Team LeMans	March 792	BMW M12/7	(Japan) Keiji Matsumoto	**1st**
1988	Team LeMans	March	Mugen Honda	(Italy) Emanuele Pirro / (United Kingdom) Geoff Lees	**3rd**
1988	Team LeMans	Reynard	Mugen Honda	(Italy) Emanuele Pirro / (United Kingdom) Geoff Lees	**3rd**
1989	Team LeMans	Reynard	Mugen Honda	(Italy) Emanuele Pirro / (United Kingdom) Geoff Lees	6th
1990	Team LeMans	Reynard	Mugen Honda	(United Kingdom) Johnny Herbert / (Japan) Takuya Kurosawa	16th
1991	Team LeMans	Reynard	Mugen Honda	(United States) Ross Cheever / (United Kingdom) Johnny Herbert / (Germany) Michael Schumacher	**2nd**
1991	Team LeMans	Ralt	Mugen Honda	(United States) Ross Cheever / (United Kingdom) Johnny Herbert / (Germany) Michael Schumacher	**2nd**
1992	Team LeMans	Reynard	Mugen Honda	(United States) Ross Cheever	**3rd**
1993	Team LeMans	Reynard	Mugen Honda	(Japan) Akira Ishikawa	NA
1994	Team LeMans	Reynard	Mugen Honda	(United States) Ross Cheever / (Japan) Naoki Hattori / (Japan) Masami Kageyama	**3rd**
1995	Team LeMans	Reynard	Mugen Honda	(Japan) Naoki Hattori	8th
1996	X Japan Racing Team LeMans	Reynard 96D	Mugen MF308	(Japan) Naoki Hattori / (Germany) Ralf Schumacher	**1st**
1997	Team LeMans	Reynard 96D Reynard 97D	Mugen MF308	(Argentina) Norberto Fontana	**3rd**
1998	LEMONed Racing Team LeMans	Reynard 97D	Mugen MF308	(Argentina) Norberto Fontana / (Japan) Satoshi Motoyama	**1st**
1999	Unlimited Racing Team LeMans	Reynard 99L	Mugen MF308	(Japan) Satoshi Motoyama / (Japan) Koji Yamanishi	**2nd**
2000	Team LeMans	Reynard 99L	Mugen MF308	(Japan) Hideki Noda / (Japan) Yudai Igarashi	5th
2001	Team LeMans	Reynard 99L	Mugen MF308	(Malaysia) Alex Yoong / (Japan) Koji Yamanishi / (Japan) Yudai Igarashi	14th
2002	Team LeMans	Reynard 99L Reynard 01L	Mugen MF308	(Japan) Masami Kageyama / (Germany) Dominik Schwager	13th
2002	Team LeMans	Reynard 99L Reynard 01L	Mugen MF308	(Japan) Takeshi Tsuchiya	4th
2003	Forum Engineering ARTA Team LeMans	Lola B03/51	Mugen MF308	(Japan) Toshihiro Kaneishi	4th
2003	Forum Engineering ARTA Team LeMans	Lola B03/51	Mugen MF308	(Japan) Takeshi Tsuchiya	8th
2004	Team LeMans	Lola B03/51	Mugen MF308	(Japan) Juichi Wakisaka	5th
2004	Team LeMans	Lola B03/51	Mugen MF308	(Japan) Takeshi Tsuchiya	13th
2005	Forum Engineering Team LeMans	Lola B03/51	Mugen MF308	(Japan) Tatsuya Kataoka	11th
2005	Forum Engineering Team LeMans	Lola B03/51	Mugen MF308	(Japan) Takeshi Tsuchiya	8th
2006	Team LeMans	Lola FN06	Toyota RV8J	(Japan) Tatsuya Kataoka	7th
2006	Team LeMans	Lola FN06	Toyota RV8J	(Japan) Toranosuke Takagi	18th
2007	Forum Engineering Team LeMans	Lola FN06	Toyota RV8J	(Japan) Tatsuya Kataoka	14th
2007	Forum Engineering Team LeMans	Lola FN06	Toyota RV8J	(Japan) Toranosuke Takagi	16th
2008	Team LeMans	Lola FN06	Toyota RV8J	(Japan) Satoshi Motoyama	11th
2008	Team LeMans	Lola FN06	Toyota RV8J	(Japan) Hiroaki Ishiura	16th
2009	Team LeMans	Swift 017.n	Toyota RV8K	(Japan) Keisuke Kunimoto	13th
2009	Team LeMans	Swift 017.n	Toyota RV8K	(Japan) Hiroaki Ishiura	6th
2010	Team LeMans	Swift 017.n	Toyota RV8K	(Italy) Kei Cozzolino	10th
2010	Team LeMans	Swift 017.n	Toyota RV8K	(Japan) Hiroaki Ishiura	8th
2011	Team LeMans	Swift 017.n	Toyota RV8K	(Japan) Kazuya Oshima	5th
2011	Team Kygnus Sunoco	Swift 017.n	Toyota RV8K	(Japan) Hiroaki Ishiura	6th
2012	Team LeMans	Swift 017.n	Toyota RV8K	(Japan) Kazuya Oshima	7th
2012	Team Kygnus Sunoco	Swift 017.n	Toyota RV8K	(France) Loïc Duval	6th
2013	Kygnus Sunoco Team LeMans	Swift 017.n	Toyota RV8K	(Japan) Ryō Hirakawa	11th
2013	Kygnus Sunoco Team LeMans	Swift 017.n	Toyota RV8K	(Italy) Andrea Caldarelli	13th
2013	Kygnus Sunoco Team LeMans	Swift 017.n	Toyota RV8K	(France) Loïc Duval	**3rd**
2014	Kygnus Sunoco Team LeMans	Dallara SF14	Toyota RI4A	(Japan) Ryō Hirakawa	8th
2014	Kygnus Sunoco Team LeMans	Dallara SF14	Toyota RI4A	(Italy) Andrea Caldarelli	12th
2014	Kygnus Sunoco Team LeMans	Dallara SF14	Toyota RI4A	(France) Loïc Duval	4th
2015	Kygnus Sunoco Team LeMans	Dallara SF14	Toyota RI4A	(Japan) Ryō Hirakawa	8th
2015	Kygnus Sunoco Team LeMans	Dallara SF14	Toyota RI4A	(Japan) Kamui Kobayashi	6th
2016	Sunoco Team LeMans	Dallara SF14	Toyota RI4A	(India) Narain Karthikeyan	14th
2016	Sunoco Team LeMans	Dallara SF14	Toyota RI4A	(Japan) Kamui Kobayashi	17th
2017	Sunoco Team LeMans	Dallara SF14	Toyota RI4A	(Sweden) Felix Rosenqvist	**3rd**
2017	Sunoco Team LeMans	Dallara SF14	Toyota RI4A	(Japan) Kazuya Oshima	12th
