= Akio Morimoto =

Japanese racing driver

Akio Morimoto (森本晃生 - Morimoto Akio; born 24 September 1960) is a Japanese team manager and retired racing driver.

== Racing record ==
=== Japanese Top Formula Championship results ===
(key) (Races in bold indicate pole position) (Races in italics indicate fastest lap)

Year	Team	1	2	3	4	5	6	7	8	9	DC	Pts
1985	Gear Racing	SUZ; 11	FSW; 9	MIN; 5	SUZ; 13	SUZ; 11	FSW	SUZ; 13	SUZ		14th	10
1986	Cabin Racing	SUZ	FSW	MIN	SUZ	SUZ	FSW	SUZ	SUZ; Ret		NC	0
1987	Cabin Racing	SUZ	FSW	MIN	SUZ	SUZ	SUG	FSW; Ret	SUZ	SUZ; Ret	NC	0
1988	Cabin Racing Team With Heroes	SUZ; 10	FSW; Ret	MIN; 11	SUZ; 8	SUG; Ret	FSW; Ret	SUZ; 7	SUZ; 7		NC	0
1989	Italya Nikkei Team Le Mans	SUZ	FSW	MIN	SUZ	SUG	FSW	SUZ; Ret	SUZ		NC	0

=== Complete 24 Hours of Le Mans results ===
Year	Team	Co-Drivers	Car	Class	Laps	Pos.	Class Pos.
1988	(Japan) Italya Sports (Japan) Team Le Mans Co.	(Italy) Lamberto Leoni (Sweden) Anders Olofsson	March 88S−Nissan	C1	69	DNF	DNF
1989	(Japan) Team Le Mans Co. (France) Courage Compétition	(Japan) Takao Wada (Sweden) Anders Olofsson	March 88S−Nissan	C1	221	DNF	DNF
