= Roberto Merhi =

Spanish racing driver (born 1991)

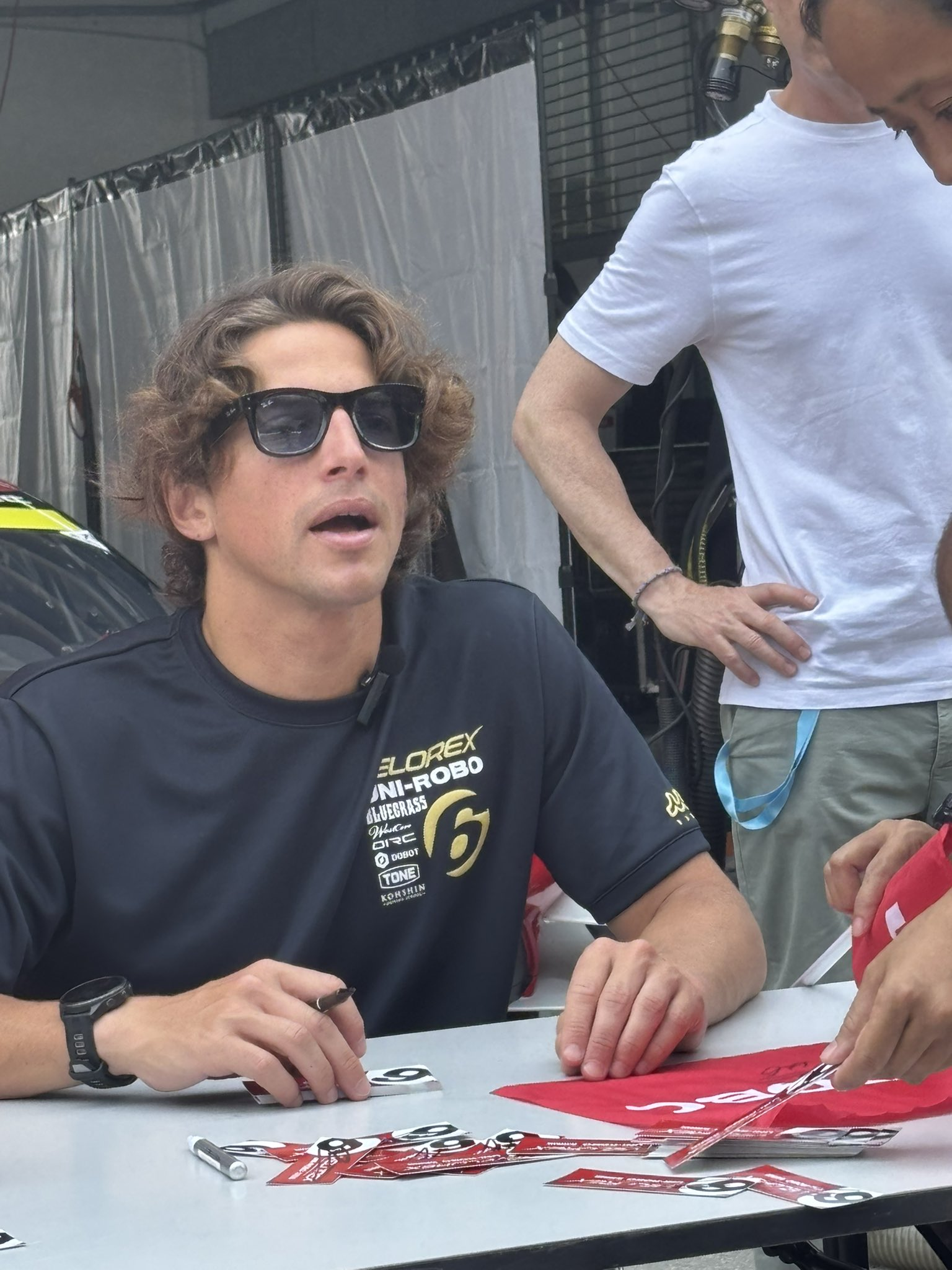
- Merhi at the 2025 Super GT Malaysia Festival
- Born: Roberto Merhi Muntan; 22 March 1991 (age 35); Castellón, Valencian Community, Spain

Formula One World Championship career
- Nationality: (Spain) Spanish
- Active years: 2015
- Team: Marussia
- Car number: 98
- Entries: 14 (13 starts)
- Championships: 0
- Wins: 0
- Podiums: 0
- Career points: 0
- Pole positions: 0
- Fastest laps: 0
- First entry: 2015 Australian Grand Prix
- Last entry: 2015 Abu Dhabi Grand Prix

Super GT career
- Debut season: 2022
- Current team: Velorex
- Categorisation: FIA Platinum
- Car number: 6
- Starts: 30
- Championships: 0
- Wins: 1
- Podiums: 5
- Poles: 1
- Fastest laps: 0
- Best finish: 9th in 2023 (GT300)

Formula E career
- Years active: 2023
- Teams: Mahindra
- Car number: 8
- Starts: 5
- Championships: 0
- Wins: 0
- Podiums: 0
- Poles: 0
- Fastest laps: 0
- Best finish: 23rd in 2022–23

Previous series
- 2014–2015 2014 2012–2013 2009–2011 2009 2008 2007–2008 2007–2008 2006–2007: Formula Renault 3.5; Stock Car Brasil; DTM; F3 Euro Series; British F3; Formula Renault WEC; Formula Renault Eurocup; Spanish F3; Italian Formula Renault

Championship titles
- 2011 2011: F3 Euro Series; FIA F3 International Trophy

Roberto Merhi Muntan (born 22 March 1991) is a Spanish racing driver. Merhi competed in Formula One for Marussia in 2015.

In his junior career, Merhi won the Formula 3 Euro Series in 2011, had a stint in DTM with Mercedes, and came third in the Formula Renault 3.5 Series in 2014. Despite a lack of funding, Merhi reached Formula One, entering 14 Grands Prix for Marussia in 2015. He later competed in LMP2, Formula 2 and Super GT. In 2023, Merhi raced part-time in Formula E for Mahindra.

Merhi currently travels to F1 races as part of Carlos Sainz Jr.'s circle.

== Career ==
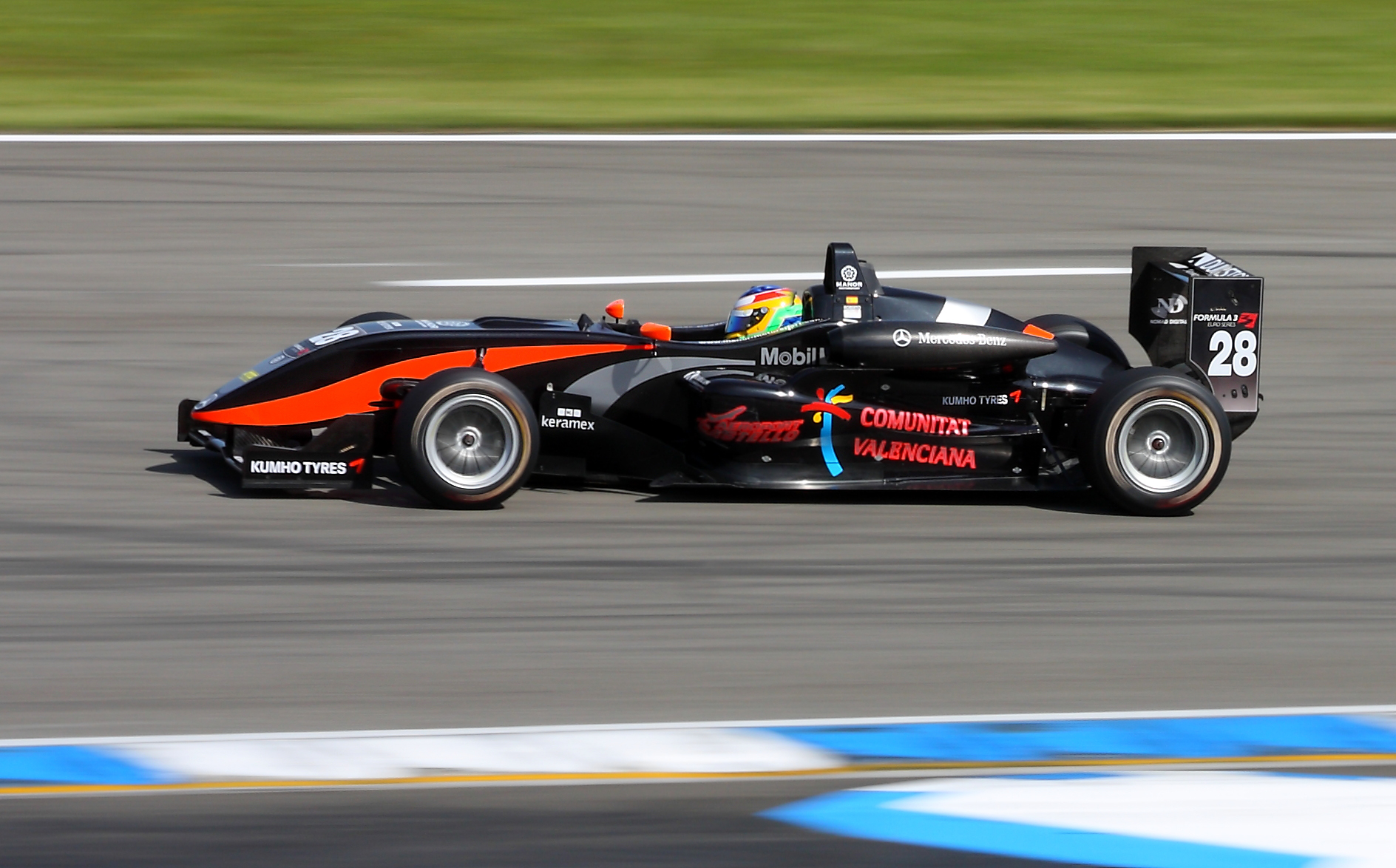
Merhi competing at the opening round of the 2009 Formula 3 Euro Series at Hockenheim.

Merhi was born in Castellón de la Plana, Spain to a Brazilian father of Lebanese descent and a Spanish mother of Austrian descent.

=== Formula Renault ===
In 2007, Merhi mainly competed in Italian Formula Renault and the Formula Renault Eurocup, finishing fourth and 18th respectively. In 2008, he competed in the West European Series, where he was runner-up, and he finished fourth in the Eurocup. He also did five races in the Spanish Formula Three Championship.

=== Formula Three ===
Merhi made the full-time step-up to Formula Three in 2009 when he was signed by Manor Motorsport for their Formula 3 Euro Series campaign, finishing seventh, with four podiums. He moved to Mücke Motorsport for the 2010 season, improving on his debut season by finishing fifth in the standings, with four podiums, including his maiden win at Hockenheim. 2011 saw another change in teams for Merhi, this time joining Prema Powerteam. Merhi subsequently won the championship, getting 20 top-three finishes, including eleven wins.

=== DTM ===
==== 2012 ====
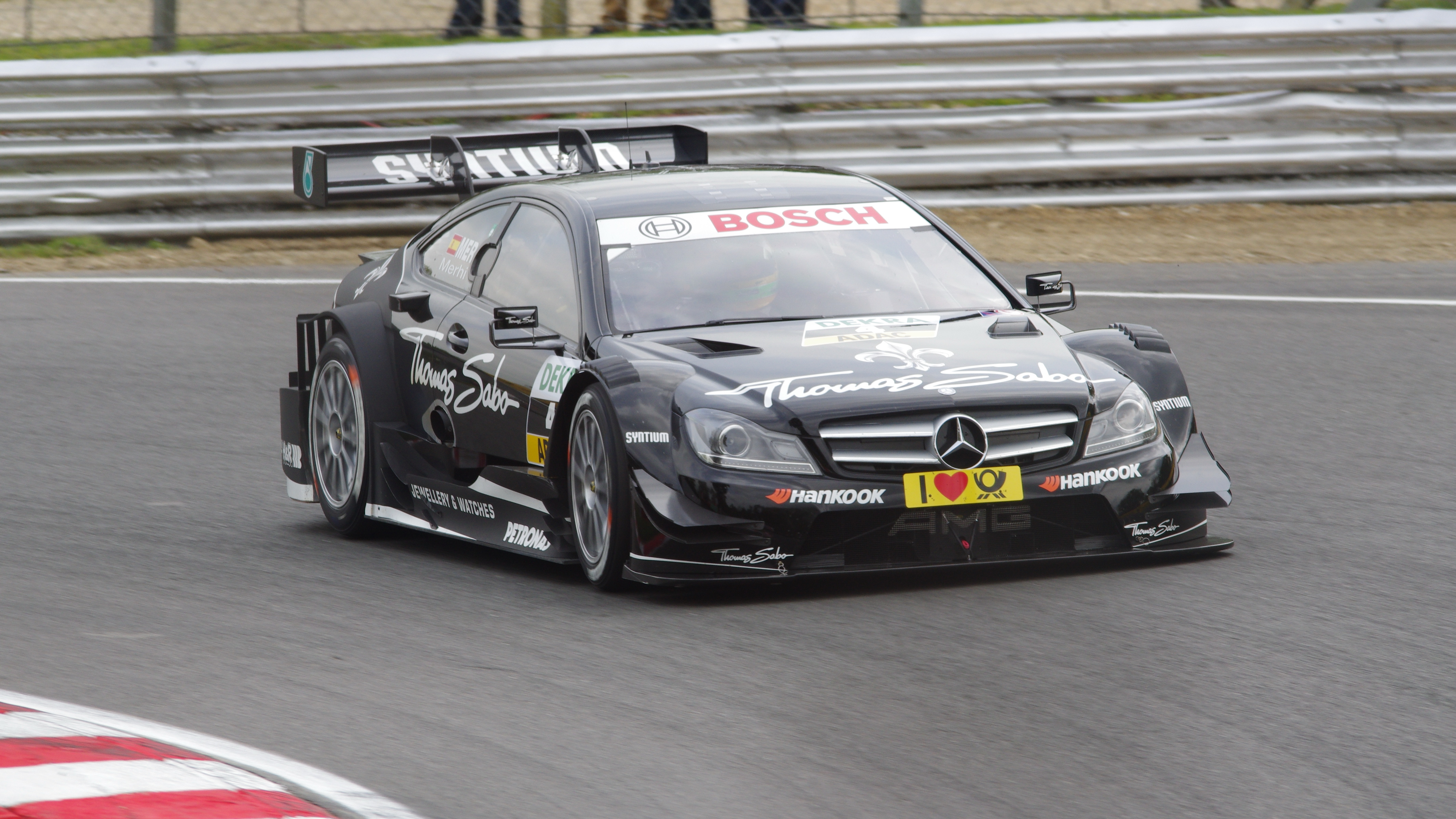
Merhi at Brands Hatch during the 2013 DTM season.

On 3 April 2012, Mercedes announced the revival of the Mercedes-Benz Junior Team that has guided several notable drivers in their racing careers like Heinz-Harald Frentzen, Karl Wendlinger and Michael Schumacher. With that announcement came the news that Merhi, together with the reigning Formula Renault 3.5 Series champion Robert Wickens and DTM-sophomore Christian Vietoris, would become a part of the new Junior Team and that the three of them would drive for the Junior Team in the 2012 DTM season. In addition to that, seven-time F1 World Champion Michael Schumacher would be involved with the three drivers by serving as a mentor. Merhi's entry into the DTM meant that he would be one of two Spaniards in the drivers field, together with Miguel Molina. Merhi scored no points in 2012 for Persson Motorsport.

==== 2013 ====
In his second season, Merhi switched to HWA Team. He collected a seventh place at the Norisring and two tenth-place finishes. In the final race of the season, he recorded his best finish of second to end the season 15th in the standings.

=== Formula Renault 3.5 Series ===
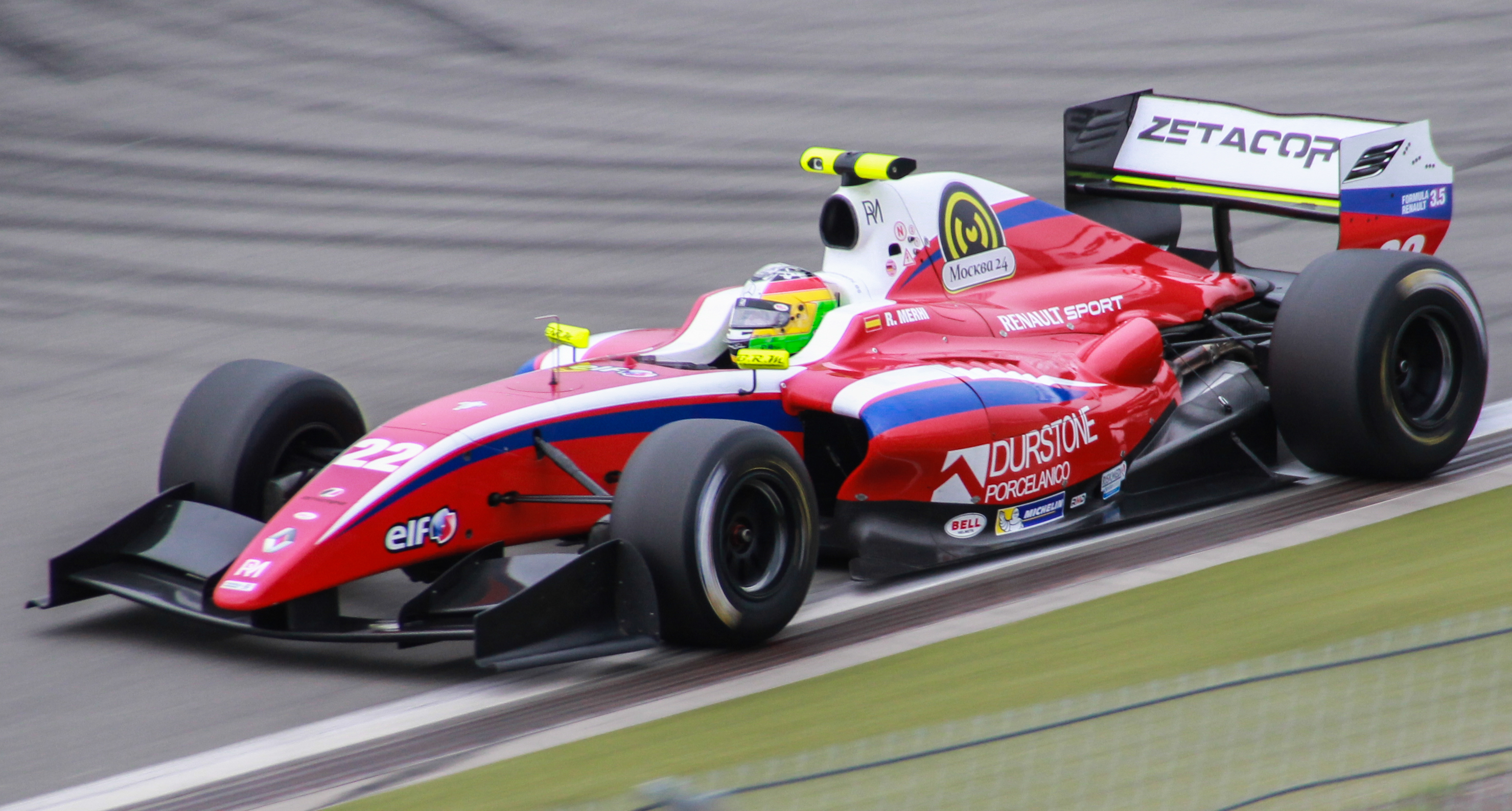
Merhi during Race 1 of the 2014 Formula Renault 3.5 Series season at Nürburgring.

Merhi moved to the Formula Renault 3.5 Series in 2014 with Zeta Corse. He achieved his first victory from pole position at the team's home race in Moscow. Merhi then scored two poles, two wins and two second places over the next two rounds at the Nürburgring and Hungaroring. In race one in Hungary, under heavy rain, Merhi dominated. By the end of lap one, Merhi had recovered from 7th to 2nd—he then pressured race leader Oliver Rowland into a mistake and ran away to win by 29 seconds over Pierre Gasly, the largest winning margin in FR3.5 history. Merhi eventually finished third in a four-way championship battle with Carlos Sainz Jr., Gasly and Rowland.

Despite his Formula One promotion, Merhi continued racing in the Formula Renault 3.5 Series in 2015, switching to Pons Racing. He missed round two at Monaco, where he was replaced by Alex Fontana. In round five at the Red Bull Ring, Merhi was deemed at fault for a post-race collision with Nicholas Latifi after Merhi slowed at the finish line. He was disqualified from the race and banned from the next two events. Merhi did not return to the series.

=== Endurance racing ===
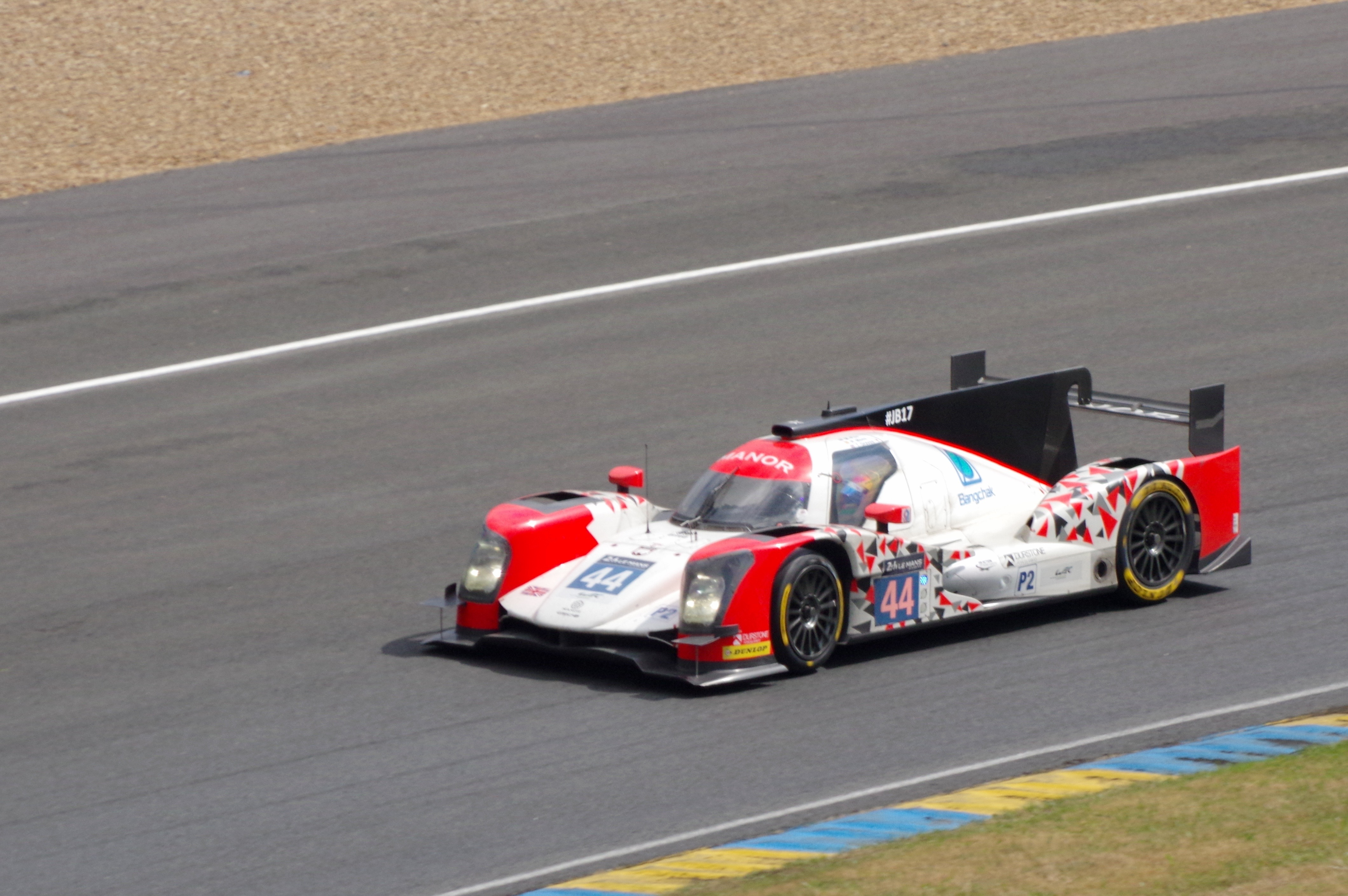
Merhi driving in the 2016 24 Hours of Le Mans

In 2016, after his Formula 1 exit, Merhi joined Manor Motorsport's LMP2 programme in the FIA World Endurance Championship. He finished third in class at the 6 Hours of Spa-Francorchamps alongside Matt Rao and Richard Bradley, and set the fastest lap on his 24 Hours of Le Mans debut.

Merhi returned to LMP2 in the 2019–20 Asian Le Mans Series, where he took a trio of podiums for Eurasia Motorsport on his way to third in the championship.

=== FIA Formula 2 Championship ===
==== 2017 ====
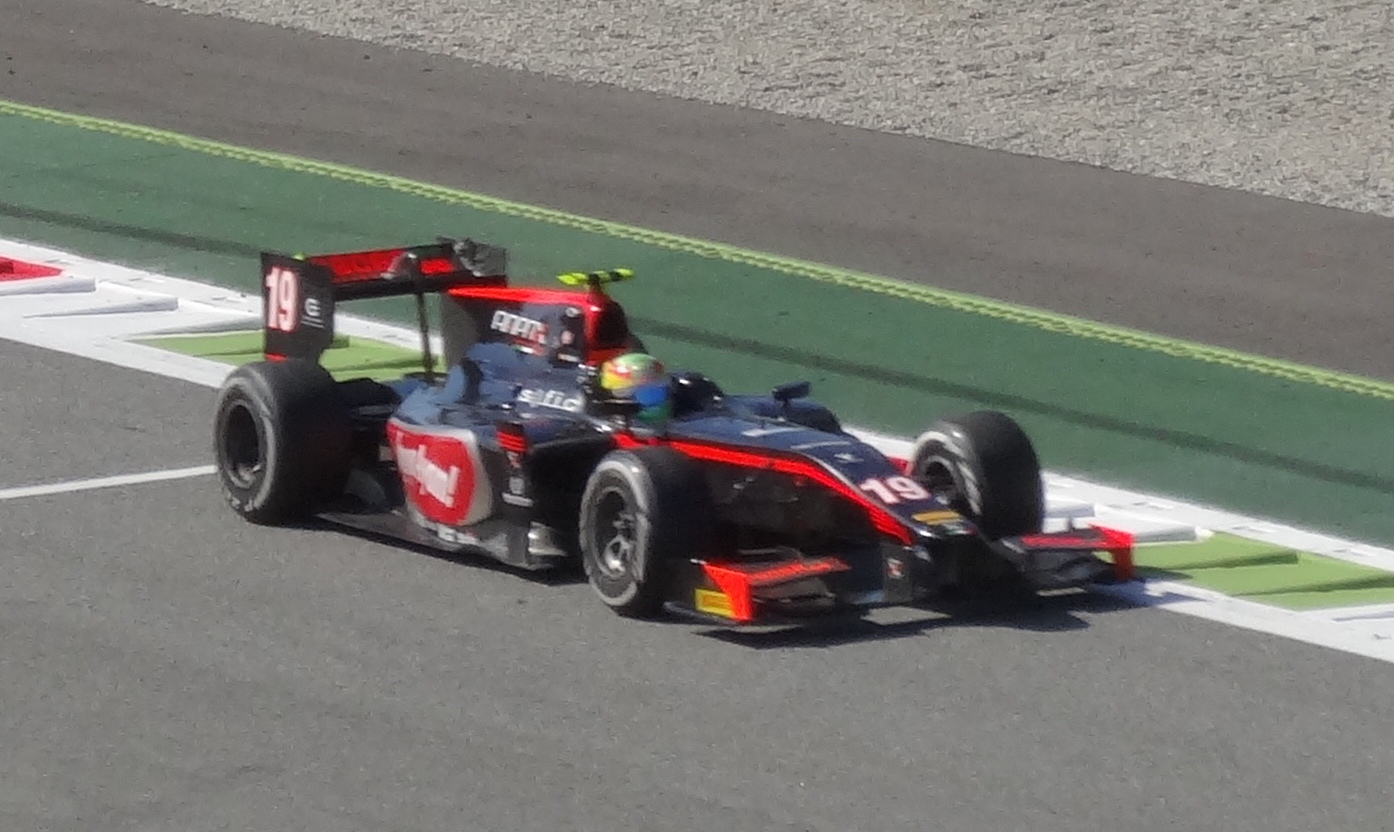
Merhi driving for Campos Racing during the 2017 Formula 2 Championship.

In 2017, Merhi replaced Stefano Coletti at Campos Racing for the Barcelona round of the championship. He also competed at the Spa, Monza and Yas Marina rounds, for Rapax Team.

==== 2018 ====
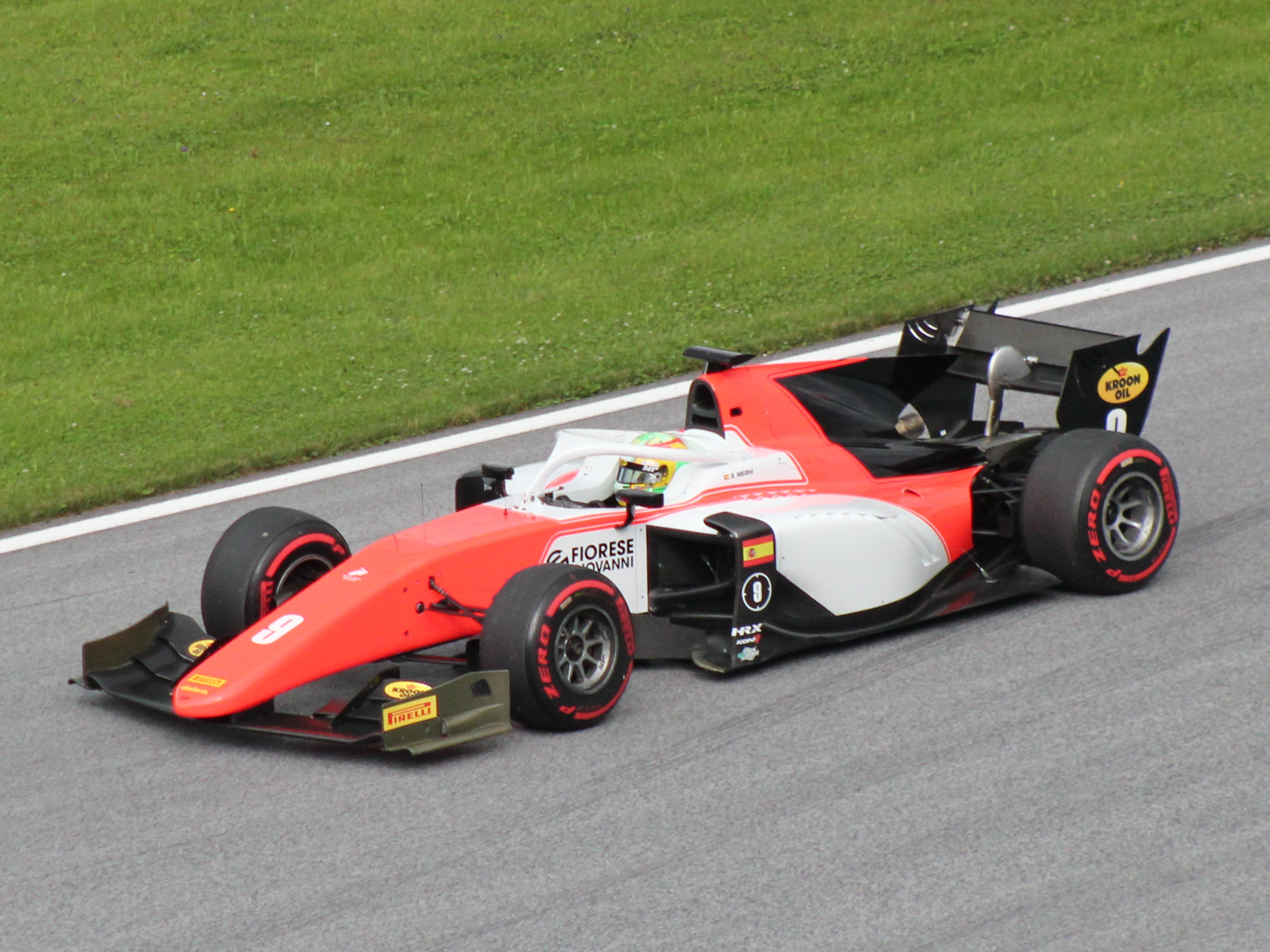
Merhi driving for MP Motorsport during the 2018 Spielberg Formula 2 round.

Merhi scored a full-time drive for the 2018 Formula 2 season with MP Motorsport. Before the Belgian round, he left the team and was replaced by their GP3 Series driver Dorian Boccolacci. He then joined Campos for the final two rounds of the season, replacing Roy Nissany.

==== 2022 ====
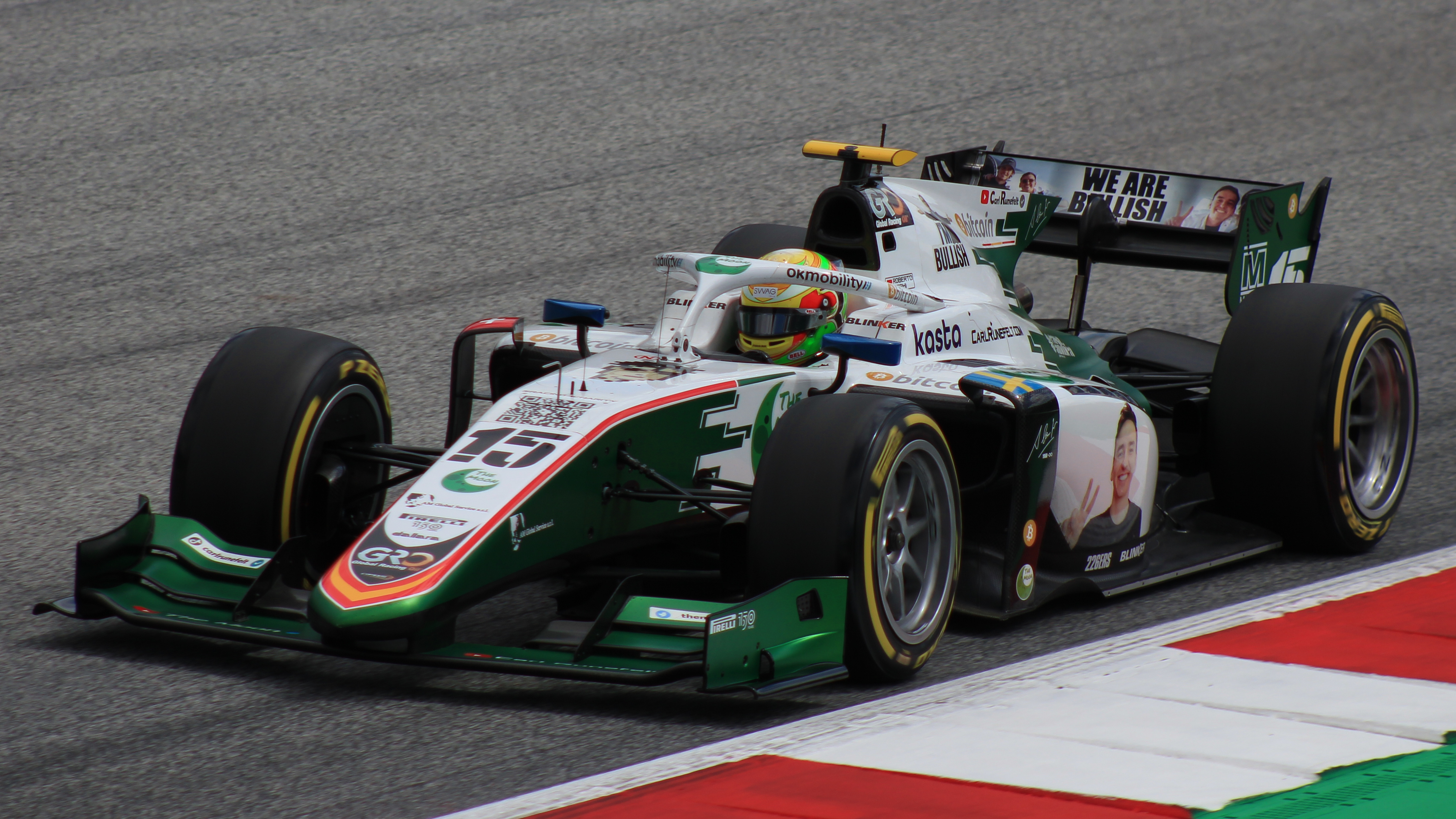
Merhi driving the Dallara F2 2018 during the 2022 Spielberg Formula 2 round.

Merhi made his Formula 2 return for Campos Racing at the Austrian round of 2022, replacing an injured Ralph Boschung. He retired from the sprint race, but scored third position in the feature race, coming back from 21st position. After his good result in Austria and the fact that Ralph Boschung was still injured, Merhi also competed in the Le Castellet round but he had to retire from both races. He also competed at the Budapest round.

=== S5000 Tasman Series ===
In 2021, Merhi competed in the Australian single-seater championship, the S5000 Tasman Series, racing for Team BRM. He got three podiums, one of them a victory, thus proclaiming himself runner-up.

=== Super GT ===
For 2022, Merhi would compete in Super GT for the Team LeMans in an Audi R8 LMS GT3 alongside drivers Yoshiaki Katayama and Shintaro Kawabata, making his debut at the second round of the championship at Fuji.

=== Super Formula Lights ===
In September 2022, Merhi announced that he would compete in the final round at Okayama of the 2022 Super Formula Lights.

=== Other racing ===
In April 2026, it was announced that Merhi would be taking part in the first round of the 2026 GT World Challenge Europe Endurance Cup with Comtoyou Racing, alongside Mari Boya and Lance Stroll.

== Formula One ==
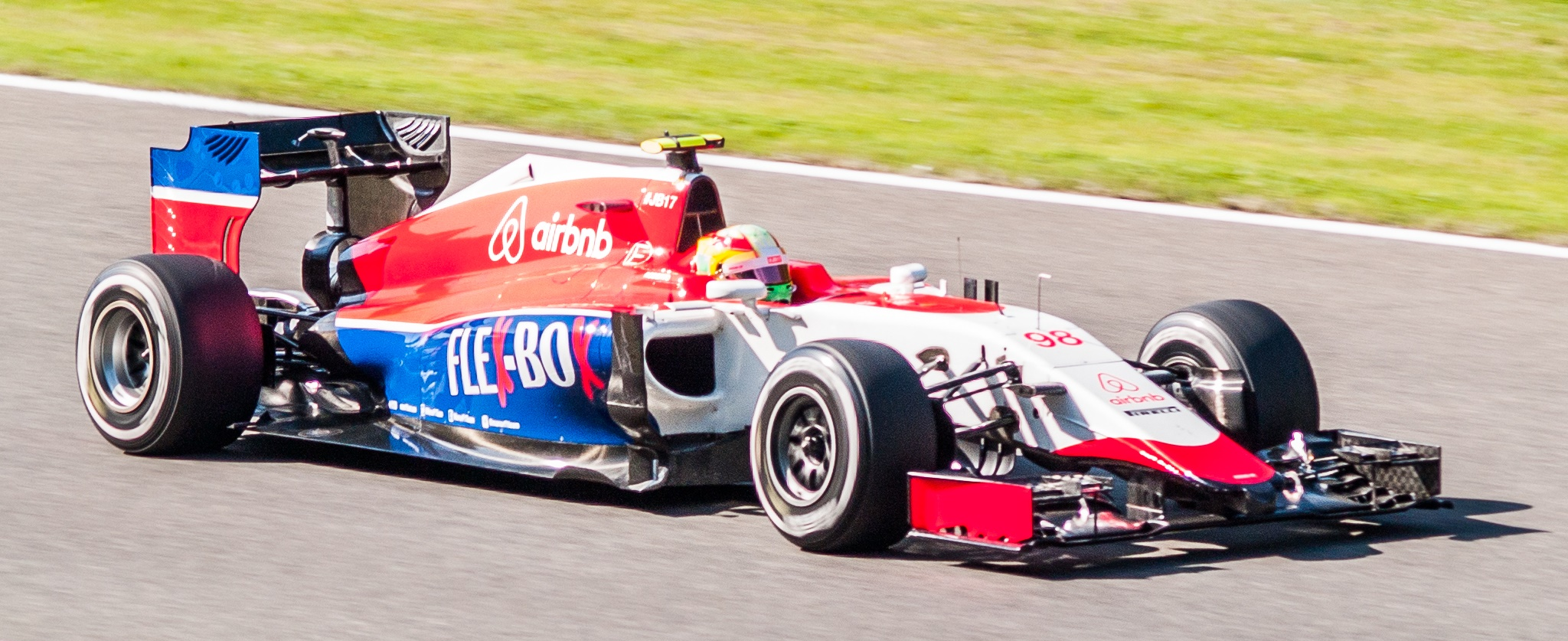
Merhi competing in the 2015 Belgian Grand Prix.

=== Caterham (2014) ===
Merhi made his first appearance in a Formula One car for the Caterham team during practice for the 2014 Italian Grand Prix. It is believed that he was being evaluated for a race seat in place of Kamui Kobayashi, but had yet to qualify for an FIA Super Licence.

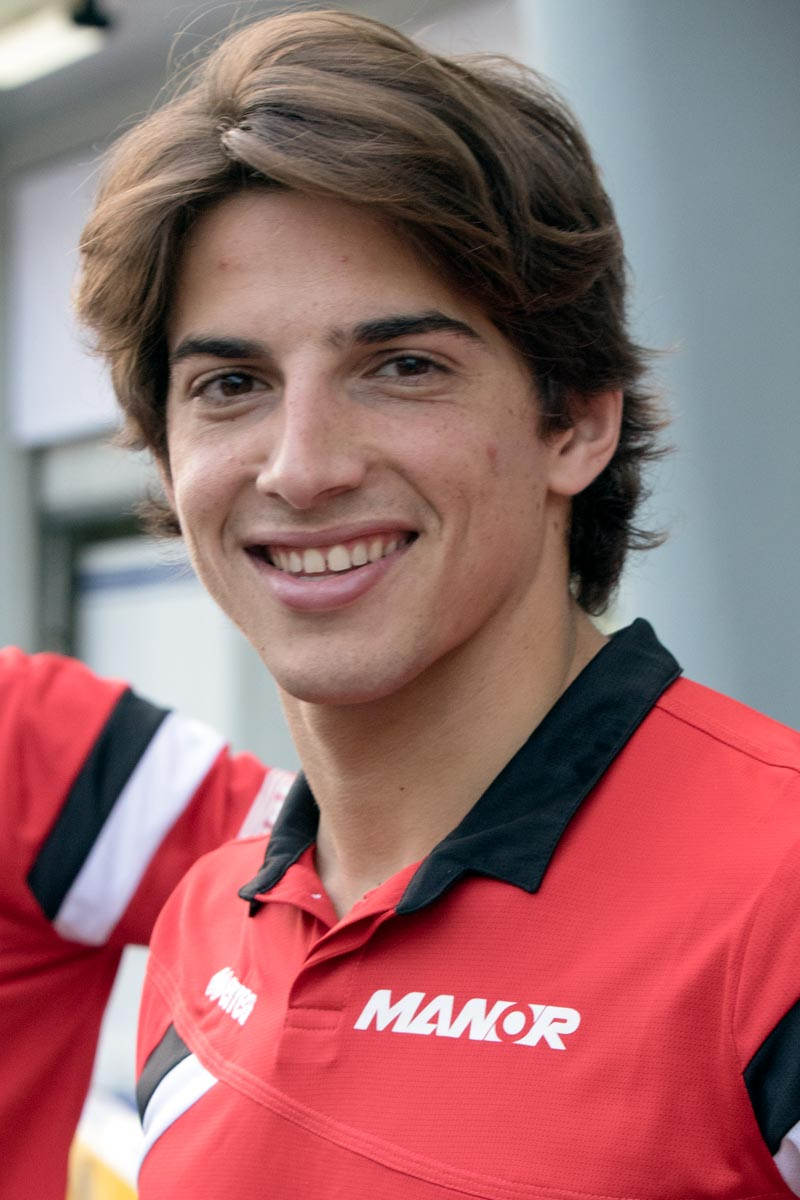
Merhi at the 2015 Malaysian Grand Prix

=== Marussia (2015) ===
On 9 March 2015, the Manor Marussia team announced that Merhi would drive in the Australian Grand Prix, alongside Britain's Will Stevens. Team principal John Booth, who had previously ran Merhi in Formula 3, chose him despite his lack of funding. Marussia ultimately did not compete in Australia due to a technical problem. Despite reportedly needing €2 million worth of sponsorship money to stay, Merhi kept his seat for the Malaysian Grand Prix. Merhi failed to set a lap time within 107% of the fastest time in Q1, but the race stewards allowed Merhi to start the race, while Stevens was sidelined by a fuel system issue. Merhi finished in 15th place, three laps down on race winner Sebastian Vettel.

In the Chinese Grand Prix, Merhi finished in 16th place behind his teammate Stevens. In Bahrain and Spain, Merhi also finished behind Stevens. However, in the Monaco Grand Prix, Merhi came 16th and beat Stevens for the first time. In Canada, Merhi was a minute ahead of Stevens when, on lap 56, he was forced to retire due to a driveshaft problem. It was Merhi's first and only DNF in Formula One, but he remained ahead of Stevens in the Drivers' Championship. After the arrival of Fabio Leimer as reserve driver, Booth and team director Graeme Lowdon brushed off rumours that Merhi was set to be replaced. In Austria, Merhi finished in 14th position. In British Grand Prix, Merhi was outqualified by Stevens, but overtook him in the race to finish 12th, Manor's best result of the year. In Italy, Merhi lost to Stevens, but started 14th, ahead of fellow Spaniards Fernando Alonso and Carlos Sainz Jr., after grid penalties in front. He finished 16th.

Merhi was dropped in favour of Alexander Rossi for five of the last seven Grands Prix of 2015, the exceptions being Russia and Abu Dhabi, which clashed with Rossi's GP2 commitments. Merhi, who was told about the swap on arrival at Singapore, expressed disappointment, but admitted that "it was difficult to continue without financial support and sponsors". Merhi came 13th in Russia, just one lap behind race winner Lewis Hamilton. He finished the season 19th in the Drivers' Championship, ahead of Rossi and Stevens.

=== Development driver (2019–2020) ===
In 2019, Merhi revealed that he was working with an F1 team as a development driver, but his contract prevented him from revealing which team he was working with. Merhi continued to work as a development driver for 2020.

== Formula E ==
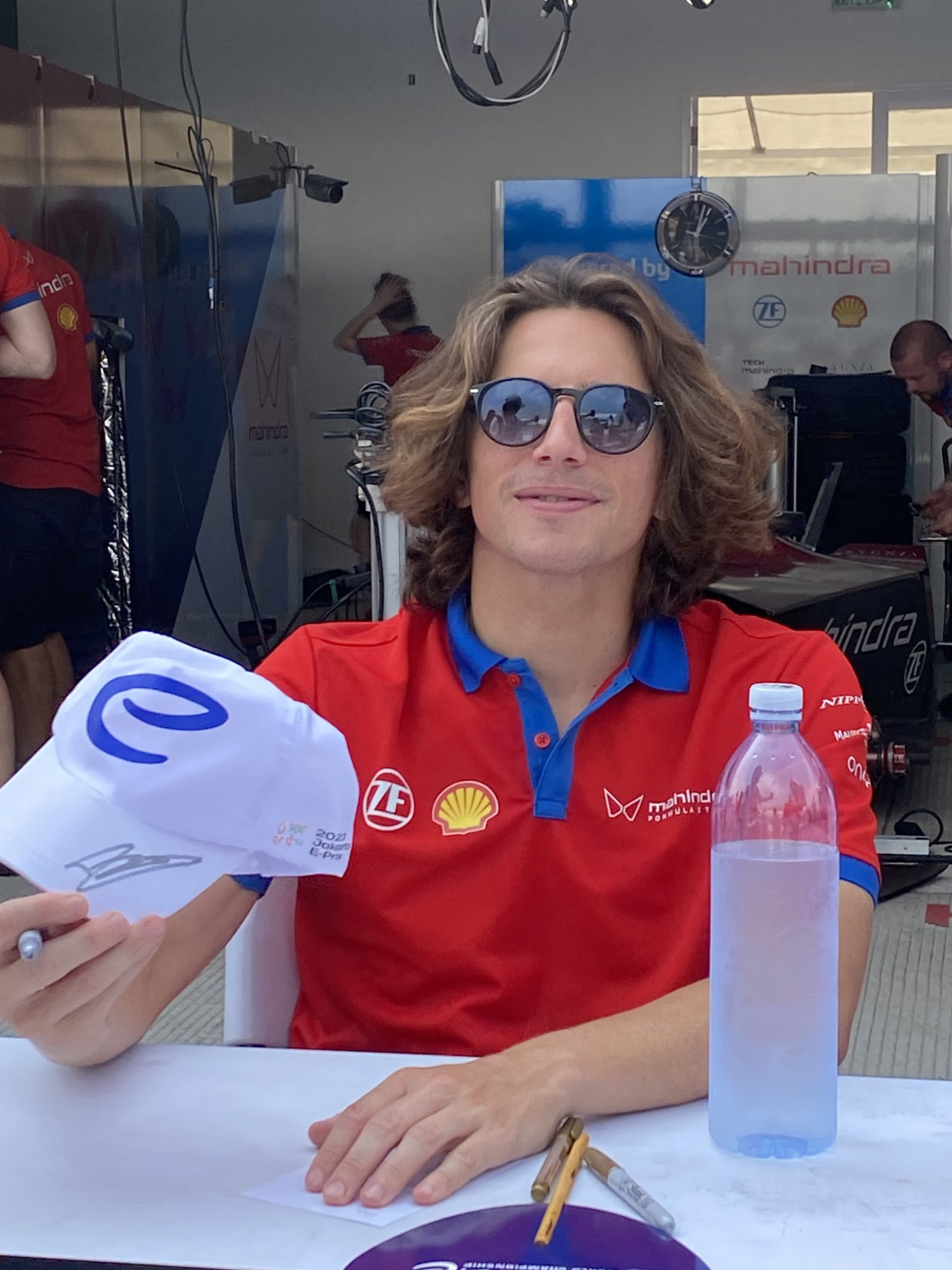
Merhi at the 2023 Jakarta ePrix

In April 2017, it was announced Merhi would be joining Formula E for the series' fourth season. However, he did not sign with any team.

Merhi returned to Formula E in April 2023, partaking in the rookie test at Berlin with Mahindra Racing.

=== Mahindra Racing (2023) ===
==== 2022–23 season ====
In May 2023, it was confirmed that Merhi would replace the departing Oliver Rowland for the 2023 Jakarta ePrix. Having been only under a contract for three races, it was confirmed that he would see out the remainder of the season with the team. Merhi was not retained by the team for the 2023–24 season.

== Other ventures ==
Merhi is a close friend of former FR3.5 title rival and F1 driver Carlos Sainz Jr., and has been part of his inner circle at Ferrari and Williams. Sainz has described Merhi as "part driver coach, part team anchor".

In 2023, Merhi co-founded TC Racing, a Spanish F4 team, with Real Madrid goalkeeper Thibaut Courtois.

== Racing record ==
=== Career summary ===
Season	Series	Team	Races	Wins	Poles	F/Laps	Podiums	Points	Position
2006	Formula Renault 2.0 Italy Winter Series	It Loox Racing	4	0	0	0	3	92	4th
2006	Spanish Formula 3 Championship	Porfesa Competición	2	0	0	0	0	0	NC
2007	Eurocup Formula Renault 2.0	Jenzer Motorsport	14	0	0	0	0	16	18th
2007	Formula Renault 2.0 Italy	Jenzer Motorsport	14	1	0	0	2	232	4th
2007	Formula Renault 2.0 Italy Winter Series	BVM Minardi	2	0	0	0	1	38	10th
2007	Spanish Formula 3 Championship	Novo	2	0	0	0	0	4	17th
2007	Spanish GT Championship - GTA	Santiago Garcia	2	0	0	0	1	6	19th
2008	Formula Renault 2.0 WEC	Epsilon Euskadi	15	3	5	6	13	184	**2nd**
2008	Eurocup Formula Renault 2.0	Epsilon Euskadi	14	2	2	1	7	108	4th
2008	Macau Grand Prix	Hitech Racing	1	0	0	0	0	0	NC
2008	Masters of Formula 3	Hitech Racing	1	0	0	0	0	0	NC
2008	Spanish Formula 3 Championship	R. Llusia Racing	5	2	1	2	3	36	13th
2009	Formula 3 Euro Series	Manor Motorsport	20	0	0	0	4	42	7th
2009	Macau Grand Prix	Manor Motorsport	1	0	0	0	0	0	17th
2009	British Formula 3 International Series	Manor Motorsport	2	0	0	0	0	0	NC
2009	Masters of Formula 3	Manor Motorsport	1	0	0	0	0	0	10th
2010	Formula 3 Euro Series	Mücke Motorsport	18	1	0	0	4	56	5th
2010	GP3 Series	ATECH CRS GP	12	0	0	1	3	26	6th
2010	Masters of Formula 3	ATECH CRS GP	1	0	0	0	0	0	12th
2010	Macau Grand Prix	Prema Powerteam	1	0	0	0	0	0	8th
2011	Formula 3 Euro Series	Prema Powerteam	27	11	8	10	20	406	**1st**
2011	FIA Formula 3 International Trophy	Prema Powerteam	8	4	3	5	6	133	**1st**
2011	British Formula 3 International Series	Prema Powerteam	3	2	2	2	2	0	NC†
2011	Macau Grand Prix	Prema Powerteam	1	0	0	0	0	0	NC
2011	Masters of Formula 3	Mücke Motorsport	1	0	1	0	0	0	NC
2012	Deutsche Tourenwagen Masters	Persson Motorsport	10	0	0	1	0	0	NC
2013	Deutsche Tourenwagen Masters	HWA Team	10	0	0	0	1	26	15th
2014	Formula Renault 3.5 Series	Zeta Corse	17	3	3	1	7	183	**3rd**
2014	British Formula 3 International Series	Double R Racing	2	0	2	2	2	39	11th
2014	Formula One	Caterham F1 Team	Test driver						
2014	Macau Grand Prix	W66.com Double R Racing	1	0	0	0	0	0	4th
2014	Stock Car Brasil	Hanier Racing	1	0	0	0	0	0	NC†
2015	Formula One	Manor Marussia F1 Team	14	0	0	0	0	0	19th
2015	Formula Renault 3.5 Series	Pons Racing	8	0	0	0	1	26	14th
2016	FIA World Endurance Championship - LMP2	Manor	7	0	0	1	1	35	14th
2016	24 Hours of Le Mans - LMP2	Manor	1	0	0	1	0	N/A	DNF
2017	FIA Formula 2 Championship	Campos Racing	2	0	0	0	0	16	18th
2017	FIA Formula 2 Championship	Rapax	8	0	0	0	0	16	18th
2017	FIA World Endurance Championship - LMP2	CEFC Manor TRS Racing	1	0	0	0	0	2	29th
2018	FIA Formula 2 Championship	MP Motorsport	16	0	0	0	1	61	12th
2018	FIA Formula 2 Championship	Campos Vexatec Racing	4	0	0	0	1	61	12th
2019–20	Asian Le Mans Series - LMP2	Eurasia Motorsport	4	0	1	2	3	65	**3rd**
2019–20	FIA World Endurance Championship - LMP2	Eurasia Motorsport	2	0	0	0	0	0	NC†
2020	24 Hours of Le Mans - LMP2	Eurasia Motorsport	1	0	0	0	0	N/A	14th
2021	S5000 Tasman Series	Team BRM	6	1	0	1	3	143	**2nd**
2021	GT World Challenge Australia	Team BRM	2	0	0	0	0	12	15th
2021	European Le Mans Series - LMP2	G-Drive Racing	3	0	0	0	1	26	14th
2021	FIA World Endurance Championship - LMP2	G-Drive Racing	1	0	0	0	0	0	NC†
2022	Super GT - GT300	Team LeMans	7	0	0	0	0	6	26th
2022	FIA Formula 2 Championship	Campos Racing	6	0	0	0	1	15	20th
2022	Super Formula Lights	B-Max Racing Team	3	0	0	0	0	0	14th
2022–23	Formula E	Mahindra Racing	7	0	0	0	0	0	23rd
2023	Super GT - GT300	Team LeMans	7	0	0	0	3	37	9th
2023	S5000 Australian Drivers' Championship	Garry Rogers Motorsport	3	0	0	1	1	63	14th
2023	S5000 Australian Drivers' Championship	88Racing	0	0	0	0	0	63	14th
2024	Super GT - GT300	Team LeMans	8	0	1	0	1	28	10th
2024	Gulf 12 Hours	Racing One	1	0	0	0	0	N/A	16th
2025	Super GT - GT300	Velorex	8	1	0	0	1	43.5	15th
2026	Porsche Carrera Cup Japan	NGR	1	0	0	0	0	4.5	20th
2026	GT World Challenge Europe Endurance Cup	Comtoyou Racing							

† As Merhi was a guest driver, he was ineligible for championship points.

==== Complete Formula Renault 2.0 Italia results ====
(key)

Year	Entrant	1	2	3	4	5	6	7	8	9	10	11	12	13	14	DC	Points
2007	Jenzer Motorsport	VAL1; 1; 5	VAL1; 2; 14	VAL2; 1; 10	VAL2; 2; 5	SPA; 1; 1	SPA; 2; 5	VAL; 1; 8	VAL; 2; 5	MIS; 1; 4	MIS; 2; 4	MUG; 1 Ret	MUG; 2 DSQ	MNZ; 1; 2	MNZ; 2; 5	4th	232

==== Complete Eurocup Formula Renault 2.0 results ====
(key)

Year	Entrant	1	2	3	4	5	6	7	8	9	10	11	12	13	14	DC	Points
2007	Jenzer Motorsport	ZOL; 1; 13	ZOL; 2; 10	NÜR; 1 Ret	NÜR; 2; 5	HUN; 1; 21	HUN; 2; 15	DON; 1; 16	DON; 2 Ret	MAG; 1; 16	MAG; 2; 9	EST; 1; 9	EST; 2; 28	CAT; 1; 11	CAT; 2; 6	18th	16
2008	Epsilon Euskadi	SPA; 1; 7	SPA; 2 Ret	SIL; 1; 3	SIL; 2; 5	HUN; 1; 3	HUN; 2; 6	**NÜR**; **1**; 1	NÜR; 2; 2	**LMS**; **1**; 1	LMS; 2; 3	EST; 1; 2	EST; 2; 7	CAT; 1; 8	CAT; 2; 28†	4th	108

==== Complete Formula Renault 2.0 WEC results ====
(key)

Year	Entrant	1	2	3	4	5	6	7	8	9	10	11	12	13	14	15	DC	Points
2008	Epsilon Euskadi	NOG; 1; 3	NOG; 2; 2	**DIJ**; **1**; 2	DIJ; 2; 2	VAL; 1; 2	VAL; 2; 4	LEM; 3	EST; 1; 3	EST; 2; 1	**SPA**; **1**; 1	SPA; 2; 2	**MAG**; **1**; 1	MAG; 2; 3	CAT; 1; 3	CAT; 2; 3	2nd	184

==== Complete Formula 3 Euro Series results ====
(key)

Year	Entrant	Engine	1	2	3	4	5	6	7	8	9	10	11	12	13	14	15	16	17	18	19	20	21	22	23	24	25	26	27	DC	Points
2009	Manor Motorsport	Mercedes	HOC; 1; 2	HOC; 2; 10	LAU; 1; 6	LAU; 2; 2	NOR; 1; 5	NOR; 2; 8	ZAN; 1; 18	ZAN; 2; 11	OSC; 1; 3	OSC; 2; 5	NÜR; 1; 18	NÜR; 2 Ret	BRH; 1; 9	BRH; 2; 11	CAT; 1; 9	CAT; 2 Ret	DIJ; 1; 5	DIJ; 2; 2	HOC; 1; 4	HOC; 2; 13								7th	42
2010	Mücke Motorsport	Mercedes	LEC; 1; 5	LEC; 2; 4	HOC; 1; 4	HOC; 2; 1	VAL; 1; 4	VAL; 2 Ret	NOR; 1; 5	NOR; 2; 11	NÜR; 1; 3	NÜR; 2; 5	ZAN; 1; 5	ZAN; 2; 3	BRH; 1; 11	BRH; 2; 10	OSC; 1; 5	OSC; 2; 9	HOC; 1; 5	HOC; 2; 2										5th	56
2011	Prema Powerteam	Mercedes	**LEC**; **1**; 4	LEC; 2; 1	**LEC**; **3**; 2	**HOC**; **1**; 1	HOC; 2; 4	HOC; 3; 1	ZAN; 1; 3	ZAN; 2; 4	ZAN; 3; 4	RBR; 1; 1	RBR; 2; 1	RBR; 3 Ret	NOR; 1; 4	NOR; 2; 2	NOR; 3; 2	NÜR; 1; 1	NÜR; 2; 1	NÜR; 3; 2	**SIL**; **1**; 1	SIL; 2; 3	**SIL**; **3**; 2	VAL; 1; 3	VAL; 2; 5	**VAL**; **3**; 1	**HOC**; **1**; 1	HOC; 2; 2	**HOC**; **3**; 1	**1st**	**406**

==== Complete GP3 Series results ====
(key) (Races in italics indicate fastest lap)

Year	Entrant	1	2	3	4	5	6	7	8	9	10	11	12	13	14	15	16	DC	Points
2010	ATECH CRS GP	CAT; FEA	CAT; SPR	IST; FEA	IST; SPR	VAL; FEA; 3	VAL; SPR; 2	SIL; FEA; Ret	SIL; SPR; 19	HOC; FEA; 16	HOC; SPR; Ret	HUN; FEA; Ret	HUN; SPR; 22	SPA; FEA; 2	SPA; SPR; 22	MNZ; FEA; 6	MNZ; SPR; 4	6th	26

==== Complete Deutsche Tourenwagen Masters results ====
(key) (Races in italics indicate fastest lap)

Year	Team	Car	1	2	3	4	5	6	7	8	9	10	Pos	Points
2012	Persson Motorsport	DTM AMG Mercedes C-Coupé	HOC; 18	LAU; 16	BRH; 17	SPL; 12	NOR; 13	NÜR; Ret	ZAN; 11	OSC; 14	VAL; Ret	HOC; 15	NC	0
2013	HWA Team	DTM AMG Mercedes C-Coupé	HOC; 10	BRH; 16	SPL; 20	LAU; 10	NOR; 7	MSC; 14	NÜR; 19	OSC; 14	ZAN; Ret	HOC; 2	15th	26

==== Complete Formula Renault 3.5 Series results ====
(key) (Races in bold indicate pole position; races in italics indicate fastest lap)

Year	Team	1	2	3	4	5	6	7	8	9	10	11	12	13	14	15	16	17	Pos	Points
2014	Zeta Corse	MNZ; 1; 2	MNZ; 2; 9	ALC; 1; 6	ALC; 2; 6	MON; 1; 9	SPA; 1 Ret	SPA; 2; 13	MSC; 1; 4	**MSC**; **2**; 1	NÜR; 1; 2	**NÜR**; **2**; 1	HUN; 1; 1	**HUN**; **2**; 2	LEC; 1; 5	LEC; 2; 4	JER; 1 Ret	JER; 2 Ret	3rd	183
2015	Pons Racing	ALC; 1 Ret	ALC; 2; 9	MON; 1	SPA; 1 Ret	SPA; 2 Ret	HUN; 1; 2	HUN; 2; 7	RBR; 1 DSQ	RBR; 2 EX	SIL; 1	SIL; 2	NÜR; 1	NÜR; 2	BUG; 1	BUG; 2	JER; 1	JER; 2	14th	26

==== Complete Formula One results ====
(key) (Races in bold indicate pole position; races in italics indicates fastest lap)

Year	Entrant	Chassis	Engine	1	2	3	4	5	6	7	8	9	10	11	12	13	14	15	16	17	18	19	WDC	Points
2014	Caterham F1 Team	Caterham CT05	Renault Energy F1‑2014 1.6 V6 t	AUS	MAL	BHR	CHN	ESP	MON	CAN	AUT	GBR	GER	HUN	BEL	ITA; TD	SIN	JPN; TD	RUS; TD	USA	BRA	ABU	–	–
2015	Manor Marussia F1 Team	Marussia MR03B	Ferrari 059/3 1.6 V6 t	AUS; DNP	MAL; 15	CHN; 16	BHR; 17	ESP; 18	MON; 16	CAN; Ret	AUT; 14	GBR; 12	HUN; 15	BEL; 15	ITA; 16	SIN	JPN	RUS; 13	USA	MEX	BRA	ABU; 19	19th	0

==== Complete FIA World Endurance Championship results ====
Year	Entrant	Class	Car	Engine	1	2	3	4	5	6	7	8	9	Rank	Points
2016	Manor	LMP2	Oreca 05	Nissan VK45DE 4.5 L V8	SIL; 6	SPA; 3	LMS; Ret	NÜR; Ret	MEX	COA; Ret	FUJ; 7	SHA	BHR; 7	14th	35
2017	CEFC Manor TRS Racing	LMP2	Oreca 07	Gibson GK428 4.2 L V8	SIL	SPA	LMS	NÜR; 9	MEX	COA	FUJ	SHA	BHR	29th	2
2019–20	Eurasia Motorsport	LMP2	Ligier JS P217	Gibson GK428 4.2 L V8	SIL	FUJ	SHA	BHR	COA	SPA; 8	LMS; 14	BHR		NC†	0†

==== Complete 24 Hours of Le Mans results ====
Year	Team	Co-Drivers	Car	Class	Laps	Pos.	Class Pos.
2016	(United Kingdom) Manor	(Thailand) Tor Graves (United Kingdom) Matt Rao	Oreca 05-Nissan	LMP2	283	DNF	DNF
2020	(Philippines) Eurasia Motorsport	(Australia) Nick Foster (Japan) Nobuya Yamanaka	Ligier JS P217-Gibson	LMP2	351	18th	14th
2021	(Russia) G-Drive Racing	(Angola) Rui Andrade (United States) John Falb	Aurus 01-Gibson	LMP2; Pro-Am	108	DNF	DNF

==== Complete FIA Formula 2 Championship results ====
(key) (Races in bold indicate pole position) (Races in italics indicate points for the fastest lap of top ten finishers)

Year	Entrant	1	2	3	4	5	6	7	8	9	10	11	12	13	14	15	16	17	18	19	20	21	22	23	24	25	26	27	28	DC	Points
2017	Campos Racing	BHR; FEA	BHR; SPR	CAT; FEA; 19†	CAT; SPR; 12	MON; FEA	MON; SPR	BAK; FEA	BAK; SPR	RBR; FEA	RBR; SPR	SIL; FEA	SIL; SPR	HUN; FEA	HUN; SPR															18th	16
2017	Rapax															SPA; FEA; 7	SPA; SPR; 6	MNZ; FEA; 11	MNZ; SPR; 5	JER; FEA	JER; SPR	YMC; FEA; 16	YMC; SPR; 10							18th	16
2018	MP Motorsport	BHR; FEA; DNS	BHR; SPR; 11	BAK; FEA; 8	BAK; SPR; 7	CAT; FEA; 13	CAT; SPR; Ret	MON; FEA; 3	MON; SPR; 7	LEC; FEA; DSQ	LEC; SPR; 15	RBR; FEA; 4	RBR; SPR; 16	SIL; FEA; 11	SIL; SPR; 9	HUN; FEA; 11	HUN; SPR; 5	SPA; FEA	SPA; SPR	MNZ; FEA	MNZ; SPR									12th	61
2018	Campos Vexatec Racing																					SOC; FEA; 9	SOC; SPR; 6	YMC; FEA; 8	YMC; SPR; 3					12th	61
2022	Campos Racing	BHR; SPR	BHR; FEA	JED; SPR	JED; FEA	IMO; SPR	IMO; FEA	CAT; SPR	CAT; FEA	MCO; SPR	MCO; FEA	BAK; SPR	BAK; FEA	SIL; SPR	SIL; FEA	RBR; SPR; 19†	RBR; FEA; 3	LEC; SPR; Ret	LEC; FEA; Ret	HUN; SPR; 14	HUN; FEA; 21†	SPA; SPR	SPA; FEA	ZAN; SPR	ZAN; FEA	MNZ; SPR	MNZ; FEA	YMC; SPR	YMC; FEA	20th	15

† Driver did not finish the race, but was classified as he completed over 90% of the race distance.

==== Complete Asian Le Mans Series results ====
(key) (Races in bold indicate pole position; results in italics indicate fastest lap)

Year	Entrant	Class	Chassis	Engine	1	2	3	4	Rank	Points
2019–20	Eurasia Motorsport	LMP2	Ligier JS P217	Gibson GK428 4.2 L V8	**SHA**; 2	BEN; 2	SEP; 2	CHA; 5	3rd	65

==== Complete European Le Mans Series results ====
(key) (Races in bold indicate pole position; results in italics indicate fastest lap)

Year	Entrant	Class	Chassis	Engine	1	2	3	4	5	6	Rank	Points
2021	G-Drive Racing	LMP2	Aurus 01	Gibson GK428 4.2 L V8	CAT	RBR; 3	LEC; 10	MNZ; 6	SPA	ALG	14th	26

==== Complete S5000 results ====
Year	Series	Team	1	2	3	4	5	6	7	8	9	10	11	12	13	14	15	16	17	18	Position	Points
2021	Tasman	Team BRM	SMP; R1; 5	SMP; R2; 1	SMP; R3; 3	BAT; R4; 4	BAT; R5; 2	BAT; R6; 5	BAT; R7; C												2nd	143
2023	Australian	Garry Rogers Motorsport	SYM; R1; 9	SYM; R2; 3	SYM; R3; 5	PHI; R4	PHI; R5	PHI; R6	WIN; R7	WIN; R8	WIN; R9	SMP; R10	SMP; R11	SMP; R12	BEN; R13	BEN; R14	BEN; R15				14th	63
2023	Australian	88Racing / Team BRM																ADL; R16; WD	ADL; R17; WD	ADL; R18; WD	14th	63

==== Complete Super Formula Lights results ====
(key) (Races in bold indicate pole position) (Races in italics indicate fastest lap)

Year	Entrant	1	2	3	4	5	6	7	8	9	10	11	12	13	14	15	16	17	18	Pos	Points
2022	B-Max Racing Team	FUJ; 1	FUJ; 2	FUJ; 3	SUZ; 1	SUZ; 2	SUZ; 3	AUT; 1	AUT; 2	AUT; 3	SUG; 1	SUG; 2	SUG; 3	MOT; 1	MOT; 2	MOT; 3	OKA; 1; 9	OKA; 2 Ret	OKA; 3; 9	14th	0

==== Complete Super GT results ====
(key) (Races in bold indicate pole position) (Races in italics indicate fastest lap)

Year	Team	Car	Class	1	2	3	4	5	6	7	8	9	DC	Points
2022	Team LeMans	Audi R8 LMS Evo II	GT300	OKA	FUJ; 14	SUZ; 18	FUJ; 16	SUZ; 5	SUG; 16	AUT; 20	MOT; 13		26th	6
2023	Team LeMans	Audi R8 LMS Evo II	GT300	OKA; 21	FUJ; 7	SUZ; WD	FUJ; 3	SUZ; Ret	SUG; 3	AUT; 15	MOT; 3		9th	37
2024	Team LeMans	Ferrari 296 GT3	GT300	OKA; 10	FUJ; 13	SUZ; 3	FUJ; 9	SUG; Ret	**AUT**; 8	MOT; 9	SUZ; 5		10th	28
2025	Velorex	Ferrari 296 GT3	GT300	OKA; DSQ	FUJ; 1	SEP; 13	FS1; 15	FS2 (Ret)	SUZ; 18	SUG; 12	AUT; 5	MOT; Ret	15th	43.5

^{‡} Half points awarded as less than 75% of race distance was completed.
^{(Number)} Driver did not take part in this sprint race, points are still awarded for the teammate's result.
^{*} Season still in progress.

==== Complete Formula E results ====
(key) (Races in bold indicate pole position; races in italics indicate fastest lap)

Year	Team	Chassis	Powertrain	1	2	3	4	5	6	7	8	9	10	11	12	13	14	15	16	Pos	Points
2022–23	Mahindra Racing	Formula E Gen3	Mahindra M9Electro	MEX	DRH	DRH	HYD	CAP	SAP	BER	BER	MCO	JAK; 18	JAK; 17	POR; Ret	RME; 12	RME; Ret	LDN; 15	LDN; 20	23rd	0

==== Complete GT World Challenge Europe Endurance Cup ====
Year	Team	Car	Class	1	2	3	4	5	6	7	Pos.	Points
2026	Comtoyou Racing	Aston Martin Vantage AMR GT3 Evo	Pro	LEC; 48†	MNZ	SPA; 6H	SPA; 12H	SPA; 24H	NÜR	POR	NC	0

Sporting positions
Preceded by Edoardo Mortara	Formula 3 Euro Series; Champion; 2011	Succeeded by Daniel Juncadella
