= Reynard 96D =

- Category: Formula Nippon
- Constructor: Reynard Motorsport
- Predecessor: Reynard 95D
- Successor: Reynard 97D

Technical specifications
- Chassis: Carbon fiber composite monocoque
- Suspension (front): Upper and lower wishbones, coil springs, rocker arms, pull-rod
- Suspension (rear): Upper and lower wishbones, coil springs, rocker arms, pull-rod
- Axle track: Front: 1,684 mm (66.3 in); Rear: 1,564 mm (61.6 in)
- Wheelbase: 2,828 mm (111.3 in)
- Engine: Mid-engine, longitudinally mounted, 3.0 L (183.1 cu in), Mugen MF308, 90° V8, NA
- Transmission: Reynard/Hewland 6-speed sequential manual
- Power: 380–500 hp (283–373 kW)
- Weight: 540 kg (1,190 lb)
- Brakes: Disc brakes
- Tyres: Bridgestone

Competition history

The Reynard 96D is an open-wheel formula race car, designed and developed by Malcolm Oastler, and constructed and built by Reynard Motorsport, for use in the Japanese Formula Nippon series, in 1996.
