= Reynard 97D =

- Category: Formula Nippon; Formula Holden
- Constructor: Reynard Motorsport
- Predecessor: Reynard 96D
- Successor: Reynard 98D

Technical specifications
- Chassis: Carbon fiber composite monocoque
- Suspension (front): Upper and lower wishbones, coil springs, rocker arms, pull-rod
- Suspension (rear): Upper and lower wishbones, coil springs, rocker arms, pull-rod
- Axle track: Front: 1,684 mm (66.3 in); Rear: 1,564 mm (61.6 in)
- Wheelbase: 2,828 mm (111.3 in)
- Engine: Mid-engine, longitudinally mounted, 3.0 L (183.1 cu in), Mugen MF308, 90° V8, NA; Mid-engine, longitudinally mounted, 3.8 L (231.9 cu in), Buick, 90° V6, NA
- Transmission: Reynard/Hewland 5-speed sequential manual
- Power: 380–500 hp (283–373 kW)
- Weight: 540 kg (1,190 lb)
- Brakes: Disc brakes
- Tyres: Bridgestone

Competition history

The Reynard 97D is an open-wheel formula race car, designed and developed by Malcolm Oastler, and constructed and built by Reynard Motorsport, for use in both the Japanese Formula Nippon, and later the Australian Formula Holden series, in 1997.
