= Marco Apicella =

Italian racing driver (born 1965)

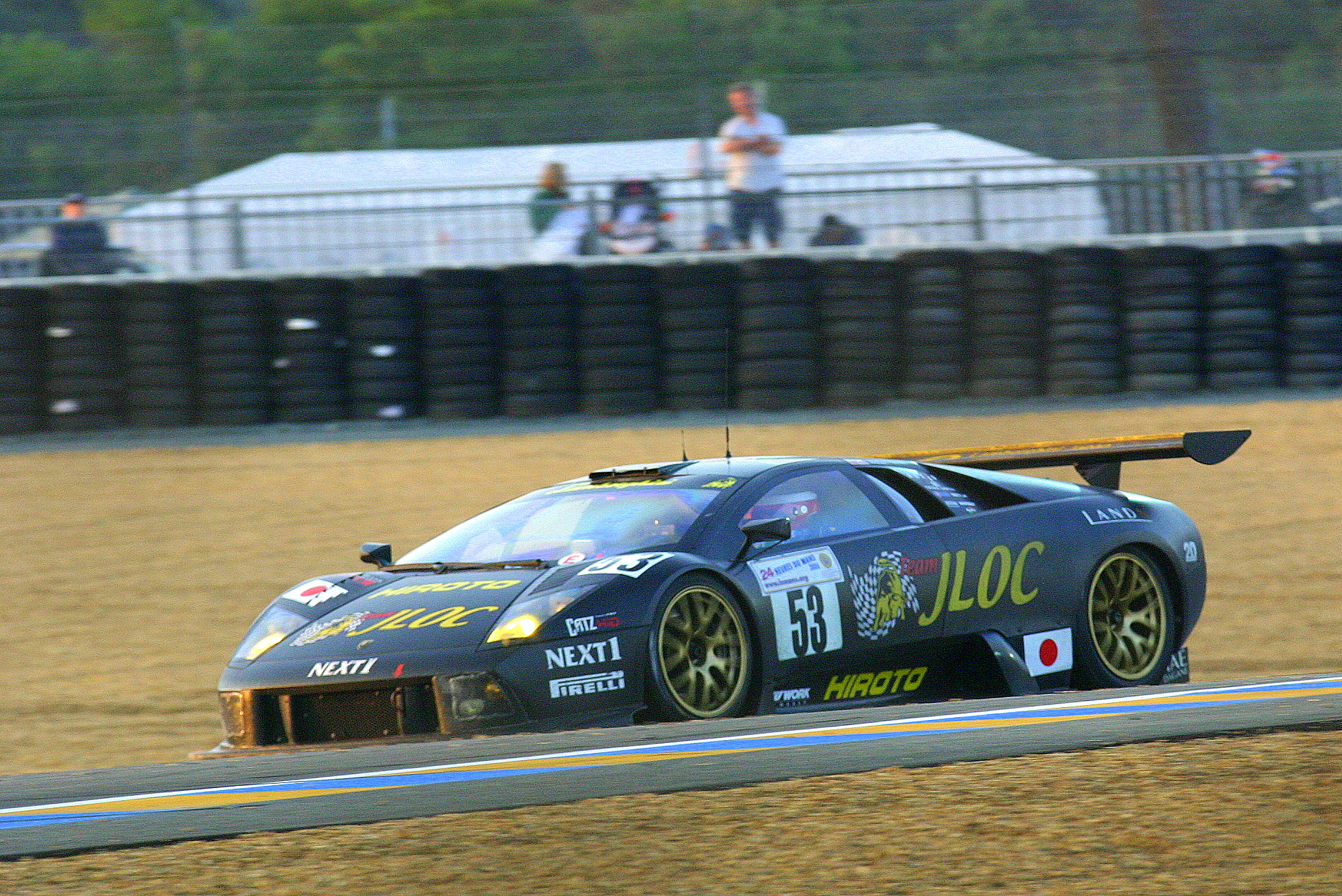
- Apicella at the 2006 24 Hours of Le Mans
- Born: 7 October 1965 (age 61) near Bologna, Italy
- Categorisation: FIA Platinum (until 2015); FIA Gold (2016–2020); FIA Silver (2021–)
Marco Apicella
Formula One World Championship career
- Nationality: (Italy) Italian
- Active years: 1993
- Team: Jordan
- Entries: 1
- Championships: 0
- Wins: 0
- Podiums: 0
- Career points: 0
- Pole positions: 0
- Fastest laps: 0
- First entry: 1993 Italian Grand Prix
24 Hours of Le Mans career
- Years: 1995, 1999, 2006–2007, 2009
- Teams: SARD Co. Ltd., Riley & Scott Europe, JLOC Isao Noritake
- Best finish: 14 (1995)
- Class wins: 0

Marco Apicella (born 7 October 1965) is an Italian former professional racing driver. He competed in one Formula One Grand Prix for the Jordan team in the 1993 Italian Grand Prix. He later won the 1994 Japanese Formula 3000 Championship driving for Dome.

== Career ==
Apicella was born in Bologna on 7 October 1965. He began competing in Formula Three racing in 1984, and took victory for Scuderia Coloni in the first two rounds of the 1986 Italian Formula Three season. Apicella competed in the 1985 Macau Grand Prix, where he failed to finish.

=== International Formula 3000 (1987–1991) ===
Apicella's first season in International Formula 3000, 1987, was uncompetitive in the EuroVenturini Dallara car, only scoring one point thanks to a fifth place at the Spa-Francorchamps circuit. During the same year, he tested the Minardi Formula One car at the Autódromo do Estoril circuit. Apicella moved to the FIRST team for the 1988 season and was a title favourite for the season. He bought the March Engineering car to a second-place finish in the Monza race, but was not as competitive as teammate Pierluigi Martini. The team underperformed, but in 1989, again with FIRST (who had made a change to Reynard Motorsport cars), Apicella achieved several podium finishes on his way to finishing fourth overall in the Drivers' Championship. Apicella looked like a championship contender for the 1990 season and continued with the FIRST team, but his performances worsened as the season progressed, ending with a disqualification in the Brands Hatch round. A crash at the Pau Grand Prix prevented him from claiming his first win. Despite a poor 1990 season, Apicella had the chance to test drive with the Modena and Minardi teams. Late in the year, he went to Japan and did some tests for Bridgestone in a Reynard-Mugen Formula One prototype car. Apicella chose to change teams for the 1991 season, moving to Paul Stewart Racing, teaming up with Stewart himself. He was classified fifth overall at the end of the season. Apicella was able to score podiums, but not victories, in the Lola car. Apicella started more International F3000 races than any other winless driver.

=== Japanese Formula 3000 (1992–1993) ===
With no offers for a drive in International F3000 for 1992, Apicella went to Japan to drive in the Japanese Formula 3000 series, setting up a relationship with the Dome team. Apicella came tenth in the standings, the best of any Dome driver. Apicella, driving the Dome F103, won the fifth round of the championship that year. He continued to improve, finishing fourth in the 1993 season, winning at the Sugo race circuit.

=== Formula One ===
Apicella's good performances in Japan during 1992 and early 1993 gave him a drive at the Jordan Formula One team for his home race in the 1993 season, with team boss Eddie Jordan wanting to try out up-and-coming Formula 3000 drivers. He replaced Thierry Boutsen. Apicella tested the Jordan 193 car at Imola before the race weekend. During practice for the race, he spun on the moist tarmac at the second Lesmo corner. He qualified in 23rd position, half a second behind teammate Barrichello, who set his times later in the session after the circuit had become less damp. It was the first time Apicella had driven a racing car with a semi-automatic gearbox. Apicella retired at the first corner of the first lap of the race after a multi-car collision. He was replaced by Emanuele Naspetti for the following round in Portugal. As a result of this, he is falsely considered to have had the shortest Formula 1 career out of any driver, a record held by Ernst Loof. Apicella retired after driving 800 metres, while Loof's car broke down as it was pulling away from the starting grid.

=== Japanese Formula 3000/Formula Nippon (1994–1996) ===
For 1994, Apicella continued with Dome in Japanese Formula 3000, winning at the Mine, Suzuka and Fuji circuits on his way to winning the title. He continued in Japanese F3000 for 1995 and 1996 (the series being renamed Formula Nippon for 1996), this time with Team 5Zigen, but his activities were limited, as he chose to do other motor sport activities such as the 24 Hours of Le Mans.

Apicella was appointed Chief Test Driver with Dome for 1996, testing the Dome F105 car alongside Shinji Nakano and Katsumi Yamamoto from April to June 1996 at the Suzuka Circuit. The aim was for the car to produce a base for them to mount a challenge into Formula One, but the project was shelved after the car was substantially damaged in an accident.

Apicella's last season in the Formula Nippon series was in 1997, driving for the Stellar International team. His best result for the team was a fourth place at the Mine circuit.

=== Other series (1999–2009) ===
Apicella moved back to Italy for 1999, competing in the Italian Formula 3000 championship and the Bologna Motorshow F3000 Sprint, which he won. He scored two wins during the season on his way to third place in the championship. Apicella also tried to qualify for the Spa round of the International Formula 3000 championship in 1999 for Monaco Motorsport, but failed to do so due to adverse weather conditions. Apicella has since gone back to Japan, to compete in touring cars with the All Japan GT Championship.

Apicella has also competed in several 24 Hours of Le Mans races. He was scheduled to compete in the 2007 event with the JLOC Isao Noritake team, but on the first day of practice he was involved in an accident on the Mulsanne Straight, which heavily damaged his Lamborghini Murciélago car. Apicella competed in the 2009 event, again with the JLOC team. This and a start for JLOC in the 2009 Super GT Series saw the end of Apicella's professional racing career.

== Racing record ==
=== Complete International Formula 3000 results ===
(key) (Races in bold indicate pole position; races in italics indicate fastest lap.)

Year	Entrant	1	2	3	4	5	6	7	8	9	10	11	DC	Points
1987	EuroVenturini	SIL; 15	VAL; Ret	SPA; 5	PAU; Ret	DON; 7	PER; Ret	BRH; DNQ	BIR; 13	IMO; 13	BUG; 15	JAR; 7	19th	1
1988	First Racing	JER; 13	VAL; 7	PAU; 5	SIL; 6	MNZ; 2	PER; Ret	BRH; Ret	BIR; Ret	BUG; Ret	ZOL; Ret	DIJ; Ret	11th	9
1989	First Racing	SIL; 8	VAL; Ret	**PAU**; 2	JER; 3	PER; 4	BRH; Ret	BIR; 2	SPA; 3	BUG; Ret	DIJ; Ret		4th	23
1990	First Racing	DON; 13	SIL; 3	PAU; Ret	JER; 2	MNZ; 5	PER; Ret	HOC; 2	BRH; DSQ	**BIR**; Ret	BUG; Ret	NOG; 5	6th	20
1991	Paul Stewart Racing	VAL; Ret	PAU; 4	JER; Ret	MUG; 2	PER; 2	HOC; Ret	BRH; 4	SPA; Ret	BUG; Ret	NOG; 11		5th	18
1999	Monaco Motorsport	IMO	MON	CAT	MAG	SIL	A1R	HOC	HUN	SPA; DNQ	NÜR		NC	0

=== Complete Japanese Formula 3000/Formula Nippon results ===
(key) (Races in bold indicate pole position; races in italics indicate fastest lap)

Year	Entrant	1	2	3	4	5	6	7	8	9	10	11	DC	Points
1989	Team LeMans	SUZ	FUJ	MIN	SUZ	SUG	FUJ	SUZ	SUZ; 4				16th	3
1992	Dome	SUZ; 9	FUJ; Ret	MIN; 6	SUZ; 11	AUT; 1	SUG; 5	FUJ; 8	FUJ; 6	SUZ; Ret	FUJ; 18†	SUZ; Ret	10th	13
1993	Dome	**SUZ**; 7	FUJ; 2	MIN; Ret	SUZ; 5	AUT; C	SUG; 1	FUJ; C	FUJ; Ret	SUZ; 4	FUJ; 4	SUZ; 9	4th	23
1994	Dome	SUZ; 2	FUJ; 4	MIN; 1	SUZ; 1	SUG; 6	FUJ; 4	SUZ; 2	**FUJ**; 1	**FUJ**; 2	SUZ; Ret		**1st**	**48**
1995	Team 5ZIGEN	SUZ; Ret	FUJ; C	MIN; Ret	SUZ; 8	SUG; Ret	FUJ; 8	TOK; Ret	FUJ; Ret	SUZ; 10			NC	0
1996	Team 5ZIGEN	SUZ; 12	MIN; 4	FUJ; 8	TOK; 8	SUZ; 14	SUG; 13	FUJ; 12	MIN; Ret	SUZ; 10	FUJ; Ret		16th	3
1997	STP Stellar	SUZ	MIN	FUJ	SUZ; 8	SUG; 5	FUJ; 8	MIN; 4	MOT; Ret	FUJ; 6	SUZ; 8		12th	6

† Did not finish, but was classified as he had completed more than 90% of the race distance.

=== Complete Formula One results ===
(key)

Year	Entrant	Chassis	Engine	1	2	3	4	5	6	7	8	9	10	11	12	13	14	15	16	WDC	Points
1993	Sasol Jordan	Jordan 193	Hart V10	RSA	BRA	EUR	SMR	ESP	MON	CAN	FRA	GBR	GER	HUN	BEL	ITA; Ret	POR	JPN	AUS	NC	0

=== 24 Hours of Le Mans results ===
Year	Team	Co-Drivers	Car	Class	Laps	Pos.	Class Pos.
1995	(Japan) SARD Co. Ltd.	(United States) Jeff Krosnoff (Italy) Mauro Martini	Toyota Supra LM	GT1	264	14th	6th
1999	(France) Riley & Scott Europe (France) Solution F	(Sweden) Carl Rosenblad (United States) Shane Lewis	Riley & Scott Mk III/2-Ford	LMP	67	DNF	DNF
2006	(Japan) JLOC Isao Noritake	(Japan) Koji Yamanishi (Japan) Yasutaka Hinoi	Lamborghini Murciélago RG-1LM	GT1	283	DNF	DNF
2007	(Japan) JLOC Isao Noritake	(Japan) Atsushi Yogo (Japan) Koji Yamanishi	Lamborghini Murciélago RG-1LM	GT1	1	DNF	DNF
2009	(Japan) JLOC	(Japan) Atsushi Yogo (Japan) Yutaka Yamagishi	Lamborghini Murciélago RG-1LM	GT1	1	DNF	DNF

=== Complete JGTC/Super GT results ===
(key) (Races in bold indicate pole position) (Races in italics indicate fastest lap)

Year	Team	Car	Class	1	2	3	4	5	6	7	8	9	DC	Pts
1997	Nismo	Nissan Skyline GT-R	GT500	SUZ	FUJ; 4	SEN	FUJ	MIN	SUG				17th	10
2000	MTCI Racing Team	Porsche Boxster	GT300	MOT; 11	FUJ; Ret	SUG; 5	FUJ; 13	TAI; 13	MIN; 8	SUZ; 9			15th	13
2001	JLOC	Lamborghini Diablo GT-1	GT500	TAI; DNQ	FUJ; Ret	SUG; Ret	FUJ; Ret	MOT; 15	SUZ; 14	MIN; 15			NC	0
2002	JLOC	Lamborghini Diablo GT-1	GT500	TAI; DNQ	FUJ; Ret	SUG; 15	SEP; Ret	FUJ; Ret	MOT; 18	MIN; Ret	SUZ; Ret		NC	0
2003	Toyota Team TOM'S	Toyota Supra	GT500	TAI; Ret	FUJ; 8	SUG; 13	FUJ; 15	FUJ; 6	MOT; 10	AUT; 13	SUZ; 14		18th	15
2004	Toyota Team TOM'S	Toyota Supra	GT500	TAI; 7	SUG; 7	SEP; 10	TOK; 4	MOT; 5	AUT; 7	**SUZ**; 2			7th	43
2005	JLOC	Lamborghini Murciélago R-GT	GT500	OKA	FUJ	SEP	SUG; Ret	MOT; 17					NC	0
2005	JLOC	Lamborghini Murciélago R-GT	GT300						FUJ; 8	AUT	SUZ; Ret		18th	3
2006	JLOC	Lamborghini Murciélago R-GT	GT300	SUZ; 1	OKA; 6	FUJ; Ret	SEP	**SUG**; 15	SUZ; Ret	MOT; Ret	AUT; 8	FUJ; 5	11th	40
2007	JLOC	Lamborghini Murciélago R-GT	GT300	SUZ; 4	OKA; Ret	**FUJ**; 2	SEP	SUG	SUZ	MOT	AUT	FUJ; Ret	12th	27
2009	JLOC	Lamborghini Murciélago R-GT	GT300	OKA	SUZ	FUJ; 18	SEP	SUG	SUZ	FUJ	AUT	MOT	NC	0

Sporting positions
Preceded by Kazuyoshi Hoshino	Japanese Formula 3000; Champion; 1994	Succeeded by Toshio Suzuki
