= 2027 Formula Regional Japanese Championship =

Motor racing competition

The 2027 Formula Regional Japanese Championship is a planned multi-event, Formula Regional open-wheel single seater motor racing championship held in Japan. Drivers will compete in Formula Regional cars that conform to the FIA Formula Regional regulations for the championship. This will be the eighth season of the series, promoted by New Pacific Sports Marketing Inc., and the 49th overall season of an FIA ladder series in Japan, dating back to the 1979 Japanese Formula 3 Championship.

== Teams and drivers ==
2027 is scheduled to see an overhaul of the chassis and engine package: The series will retire the Dome F111/3 car and replace it with the new second-generation Formula Regional Dome F112 car. The engine and tire suppliers were also changed, with Toyota now providing engines and Pirelli supplying tyres.

Team	No.	Driver	Status	Rounds	Ref
(Japan) TOM'S	35	TBA		TBC	
(Japan) TOM'S	36	TBA		TBC	
(Japan) TOM'S	37	TBA		TBC	
(Japan) TOM'S	38	TBA		TBC	

Icon	Legend
M	Masters' Class
