= Katsumi Yamamoto =

Katsumi Yamamoto may refer to:

- Katsumi Yamamoto (rowing)
- Katsumi Yamamoto (racing driver)
