= 1995 Japanese Formula 3000 Championship =

The 1995 Japanese Formula 3000 Championship was scheduled over 9 rounds and contested over 8 rounds. 16 different teams, 26 different drivers, 3 different chassis and 3 different engines competed.

This was the last season of the Japanese Formula 3000 Championship as the main single seater racing category in Japan. It was replaced in 1996 by the Japanese Formula Nippon Championship.

== Teams and drivers ==
Team	No.	Driver	Chassis	Engine	Tyre	Rounds
Team 5ZIGEN	1	(Italy) Marco Apicella	Reynard 94D; Reynard 95D	Judd KV2	Y	All
Team 5ZIGEN	5	(United States) Jeff Krosnoff	Lola T94/50	Judd KV2	Y	All
Team 5ZIGEN	6	(Japan) Hidetoshi Mitsusada	Lola T93/50	Cosworth DFV	Y	4, 6–9
Heroes Racing Corporation	3	(Japan) Katsutomo Kaneishi	Lola T94/50	Judd KV2	B	All
Advan Sport	7	(Japan) Masami Kageyama	Lola T94/50; Lola T95/50	Mugen MF308	Y	All
Speed Star Wheel Racing Team avex Dome with Mugen Racing Team	8	(Japan) Shinji Nakano	Dome F104	Mugen MF308	Y B	All
Shionogi Team Nova	9	(Italy) Mauro Martini	Lola T95/50	Mugen MF308	B	All
Shionogi Team Nova	10	(Japan) Akira Iida	Lola T95/50	Mugen MF308	B	1–3, 5–9
Shionogi Team Nova	10	(Japan) Yukihiro Hane	Lola T95/50	Mugen MF308	B	4
Cosmo Oil Racing Team Cerumo; Cerumo Co.	11	(Denmark) Tom Kristensen	Lola T94/50	Mugen MF308	B	All
Cosmo Oil Racing Team Cerumo; Cerumo Co.	12	(Japan) Motonari Higuchi	Lola T94/50	Mugen MF308	B	8
Cosmo Oil Racing Team Cerumo; Cerumo Co.	12	(Japan) "Osamu"	Lola T94/50	Mugen MF308	B	9
Hoshino Racing; Nisseki Impul Racing Team	15	(Japan) Toshio Suzuki	Lola T94/50	Mugen MF308	B	All
Hoshino Racing; Nisseki Impul Racing Team	19	(Japan) Kazuyoshi Hoshino	Lola T93/50; Lola T95/50	Mugen MF308	B	All
Ad Racing Team	17	(Japan) Taichiro Oonishi	Lola T94/50	Judd KV2	Y	1
Ad Racing Team	18	(Japan) Naohiro Furuya	Lola T93/50	Cosworth DFV	Y	1
Oasys; Stellar International	20	(United Kingdom) Andrew Gilbert-Scott	Lola T93/50	Mugen MF308	B	All
Oasys; Stellar International	21	(Germany) Michael Krumm	Lola T93/50	Mugen MF308	B	3–9
Team LeMans; X Japan Racing Team	24	(Japan) Naoki Hattori	Reynard 95D	Mugen MF308	B	All
Team LeMans; X Japan Racing Team	25	(Japan) Katsumi Yamamoto	Reynard 94D; Reynard 95D	Mugen MF308	B	All
Navi Connection Racing	27	(Japan) Masahiko Kageyama	Reynard 94D; Reynard 95D	Mugen MF308	Y B	All
Navi Connection Racing	28	(Japan) Masahiko Kondo	Reynard 94D	Mugen MF308	Y B	4–9
Team Gullwing	30	(Japan) Hideki Okada	Lola T93/50	Cosworth DFV	Y	3–6, 8–9
With Project	33	(Japan) Masatomo Shimizu	Lola T93/50	Mugen MF308	Y	2, 6, 8
Nakajima Planning	64	(Japan) Toranosuke Takagi	Reynard 94D; Reynard 95D	Mugen MF308	B	All
Nakajima Planning	65	(Japan) Takuya Kurosawa	Reynard 94D; Reynard 95D	Mugen MF308	B	All

== Race calendar ==
All races were held in Japan.

Round	Race name	Circuit	Location	Date
1	Million Card Cup Race Round 1 Suzuka	Suzuka Circuit	Suzuka, Mie	19 March
2	International Formula Cup	Fuji Speedway	Oyama, Shizuoka	9 April
3	F3000 Mine All Star	Mine Circuit	Mine, Yamaguchi Prefecture	7 May
4	Million Card Cup Race Round 2 Suzuka	Suzuka Circuit	Suzuka, Mie	21 May
5	Sugo Inter Formula F3000 & F3	Sportsland SUGO	Shibata, Miyagi	30 July
6	Fuji Inter F3000 & F3	Fuji Speedway	Oyama, Shizuoka	3 September
7	Tokachi International F3000	Tokachi International Speedway	Sarabetsu, Hokkaido	17 September
8	International F3000 Fuji Final	Fuji Speedway	Oyama, Shizuoka	15 October
9	Million Card Cup Race Final Round Suzuka	Suzuka Circuit	Suzuka, Mie	19 November

== Race results ==
Round 2 at Fuji Speedway was cancelled after the race was red flagged with one lap completed due to heavy rain.

Round	Circuit	Pole position	Fastest lap	Winning driver	Winning team
1	Suzuka Circuit	(United Kingdom) Andrew Gilbert-Scott	(Japan) Toshio Suzuki	(Japan) Naoki Hattori	Team LeMans
2	Fuji Speedway	(Japan) Naoki Hattori	Race cancelled due to weather conditions		
3	Mine Circuit	(Denmark) Tom Kristensen	(United States) Jeff Krosnoff	(Denmark) Tom Kristensen	Cosmo Oil Racing Team Cerumo
4	Suzuka Circuit	(Japan) Takuya Kurosawa	(Japan) Toshio Suzuki	(Japan) Toshio Suzuki	Hoshino Racing
5	Sportsland SUGO	(Japan) Toranosuke Takagi	(United States) Jeff Krosnoff	(Japan) Toranosuke Takagi	Nakajima Planning
6	Fuji Speedway	(Japan) Toshio Suzuki	(Japan) Katsutomo Kaneishi	(United Kingdom) Andrew Gilbert-Scott	Stellar International
7	Tokachi International Speedway	(Japan) Toranosuke Takagi	(Japan) Toranosuke Takagi	(Japan) Toranosuke Takagi	Nakajima Planning
8	Fuji Speedway	(Japan) Naoki Hattori	(Japan) Toranosuke Takagi	(Japan) Toranosuke Takagi	Nakajima Planning
9	Suzuka Circuit	(Japan) Masahiko Kageyama	(Japan) Kazuyoshi Hoshino	(Japan) Toshio Suzuki	Hoshino Racing

== Championship standings ==
Scoring system

Points were awarded to the top six classified finishers. For the Drivers standings, the best six results were counted

Position	1st	2nd	3rd	4th	5th	6th
Points	9	6	4	3	2	1

Driver standings

Rank	Driver	SUZ	FUJ	MIN	SUZ	SUG	FUJ	TOK	FUJ	SUZ	Points
1	(Japan) Toshio Suzuki	5	C	2	1	Ret	3	(6)	3	1	34 (35)
2	(Japan) Toranosuke Takagi	7	C	5	Ret	1	12	1	1	Ret	29
3	(Denmark) Tom Kristensen	4	C	1	2	Ret	4	2	Ret	5	29
4	(Japan) Kazuyoshi Hoshino	11	C	3	6	Ret	2	Ret	2	4	20
5	(Italy) Mauro Martini	(6)	C	6	3	4	5	Ret	5	3	16 (17)
6	(Japan) Takuya Kurosawa	2	C	Ret	4	Ret	9	Ret	7	2	15
7	(United Kingdom) Andrew Gilbert-Scott	8	C	Ret	11	6	1	8	6	6	12
8	(Japan) Naoki Hattori	1	C	Ret	7	5	Ret	10	Ret	Ret	11
9	(Japan) Katsumi Yamamoto	Ret	C	4	Ret	2	Ret	Ret	8	Ret	9
10	(Japan) Katsutomo Kaneishi	Ret	C	Ret	5	7	13	4	4	Ret	8
11	(Japan) Shinji Nakano	Ret	C	7	Ret	3	Ret	5	9	8	6
12	(Japan) Masahiko Kageyama	3	C	8	Ret	Ret	6	Ret	Ret	Ret	5
13	(Japan) Masami Kageyama	12	C	Ret	Ret	Ret	Ret	3	14	Ret	4
14	(Germany) Michael Krumm			Ret	Ret	Ret	Ret	7	Ret	7	0
15	(Japan) Hidetoshi Mitsusada				Ret		7	Ret	Ret	9	0
16	(Italy) Marco Apicella	Ret	C	Ret	8	Ret	8	Ret	Ret	10	0
17	(Japan) Akira Iida	Ret	C	Ret		8	11	Ret	11	11	0
18	(United States) Jeff Krosnoff	10	C	9	12	9	10	Ret	12	Ret	0
19	(Japan) Masahiko Kondo				10	10	Ret	9	13	12	0
20	(Japan) Hideki Okada			Ret	9	Ret	14		10	Ret	0
21	(Sweden) Thomas Danielsson	9									0
22	(Japan) Masatomo Shimizu		C				15		15		0
23	(Japan) Motonari Higuchi								16		0
	(Japan) Yukihiro Hane				Ret						-
	(Japan) "Osamu"									Ret	-
	(Japan) Naohiro Furuya	DNS									-
Rank	Driver	SUZ	FUJ	MIN	SUZ	SUG	FUJ	TOK	FUJ	SUZ	Points

== Complete Overview ==
first column of every race	10	= grid position

second column of every race	10	= race result

R13=retired, but classified R=retired NS=did not start

Place	Name	Country	Team	Chassis	Engine	(Japan)		(Japan)		(Japan)		(Japan)		(Japan)		(Japan)		(Japan)		(Japan)		(Japan)
1	Toshio Suzuki	Japan	Hoshino Racing	Lola	Mugen Honda	13	5	11	C	4	2	6	1	2	R	1	3	7	6	7	3	8	1
2	Toranosuke Takagi	Japan	Nakajima Racing	Reynard	Mugen Honda	9	7	12	C	10	5	13	R	1	1	5	12	1	1	5	1	3	R
3	Tom Kristensen	Denmark	Team Cerumo	Lola	Mugen Honda	6	4	3	C	1	1	4	2	5	R	2	4	3	2	11	R	18	5
4	Kazuyoshi Hoshino	Japan	Team Impul	Lola	Mugen Honda	4	11	6	C	7	3	15	6	3	R	3	2	4	R	4	2	2	4
5	Mauro Martini	Italy	Team Nova	Lola	Mugen Honda	10	6	10	C	2	6	9	3	11	4	18	5	15	R	9	5	14	3
6	Takuya Kurosawa	Japan	Nakajima Racing	Reynard	Mugen Honda	7	2	15	C	8	R	1	4	6	R	17	9	5	R	13	7	6	2
7	Andrew Gilbert Scott	United Kingdom	Stellar International	Lola	Mugen Honda	1	8	4	C	5	R	8	11	14	6	9	1	11	8	8	6	12	6
8	Naoki Hattori	Japan	Team LeMans	Reynard	Mugen Honda	2	1	1	C	11	R	16	7	12	5	4	R	8	10	1	R	4	R
9	Katsumi Yamamoto	Japan	X Japan Racing	Reynard	Mugen Honda	12	R	13	C	3	4	11	R	7	2	11	R	18	R	8	6	11	R
10	Katsutomo Kaneishi	Japan	Heros Racing	Lola	Judd	3	R	8	C	9	R	2	5	16	7	6	R13	9	4	10	4	7	R
11	Shinji Nakano	Japan	Speed Star Wheel Racing	Dome	Mugen Honda	15	R	5	C	14	7	10	R	10	3	10	R	13	5	15	9	15	8
12	Masahiko Kageyama	Japan	Navi Connection Racing	Reynard	Mugen Honda	5	3	9	C	17	8	5	R	8	R	7	6	17	R	2	R	1	R
13	Masami Kageyama	Japan	Advan Sport Pal	Lola	Mugen Honda	11	12	7	C	13	R	14	R	15	R	12	R	16	3	18	14	5	R
-	Michael Krumm	Germany	Stellar International	Lola	Mugen Honda	-	-	-	-	16	R	18	R	13	R	15	R	6	7	20	R	13	7
-	Hidetoshi Mitsusada	Japan	Team 5Zigen	Lola	Cosworth	-	-	-	-	-	-	12	R	-	-	13	7	12	R	16	R	10	9
-	Marco Apicella	Italy	Team 5Zigen	Reynard	Judd	8	R	2	C	6	R	7	8	4	R	8	8	2	R	3	R	16	10
-	Akira Iida	Japan	Team Nova	Lola	Mugen Honda	17	R	16	C	15	R	-	-	18	8	16	11	10	R	17	11	19	11
-	Jeff Krosnoff	United States	Team 5Zigen	Lola	Judd	14	10	14	C	12	9	3	12	9	9	19	10	14	R	12	12	9	R
-	Masahiko Kondo	Japan	Navi Connection Racing	Reynard	Mugen Honda	-	-	-	-	-	-	19	10	19	10	20	R	19	9	19	13	21	12
-	Hideki Okada	Japan	Team Gullwing	Lola	Cosworth	-	-	-	-	18	R	17	9	17	R	14	14	-	-	14	10	17	R
-	Thomas Danielsson	Sweden	Ad Racing Team Co. Ltd.	Lola	Judd	16	9	-	-	-	-	-	-	-	-	-	-	-	-	-	-	-	-
-	Masatomo Shimizu	Japan	With Project	Lola	Mugen Honda	-	-	17	C	-	-	-	-	-	-	21	15	-	-	21	15	-	-
-	Motonari Higuchi	Japan	Team Cerumo	Lola	Mugen Honda	-	-	-	-	-	-	-	-	-	-	-	-	-	-	22	16	-	-
-	Yukihiro Hane	Japan	Team Nova	Lola	Mugen Honda	-	-	-	-	-	-	20	R	-	-	-	-	-	-	-	-	-	-
-	"Osamu"	Japan	Team Cerumo	Lola	Mugen Honda	-	-	-	-	-	-	-	-	-	-	-	-	-	-	-	-	20	R
-	Naohiro Furuya	Japan	Ad Racing Team Co. Ltd.	Lola	Cosworth	18	NS	-	-	-	-	-	-	-	-	-	-	-	-	-	-	-	-
