= Dome F105 =

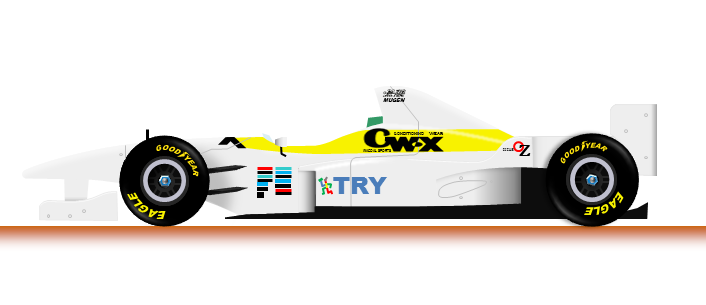
- Category: Formula One
- Constructor: Dome
- Designer: Akiyoshi Oku

Technical specifications
- Chassis: Carbon fibre/aluminium honeycomb sandwich monocoque
- Suspension (front): Double wishbone, pushrod-actuated with Showa shock absorbers
- Suspension (rear): As front
- Length: 4,515 millimetres (177.8 in)
- Width: 1,995 millimetres (78.5 in)
- Height: 980 millimetres (39 in)
- Axle track: Front: 1,708 millimetres (67.2 in); Rear: 1,619 millimetres (63.7 in)
- Wheelbase: 2,860 millimetres (113 in)
- Engine: Mugen-Honda MF301H 3.0 litres (180 in^{3}) V10 normally aspirated mid-mounted
- Transmission: Xtrac/DAMS/Minardi 6-speed sequential semi-automatic
- Weight: 510 kilograms (1,120 lb)
- Tyres: Goodyear

Competition history
- Notable entrants: Dome
- Notable drivers: (Italy) Marco Apicella (Japan) Naoki Hattori (Japan) Shinji Nakano
- Debut: Test car only
Races	Wins	Poles	F/Laps
0	0	0	0
- Constructors' Championships: 0
- Drivers' Championships: 0

The Dome F105 was an unraced Formula One car designed and built by the Japanese motorsport constructor, Dome.

== Concept and construction ==
Dome was founded in 1975 by brothers Minoru and Shoichi Hayashi, who had built their first racing car ten years earlier. In 1980 the company built its first Formula Three car, and the Hayashi Racing team won the All-Japan Formula Three Championship in 1981 using its own 320 chassis. Dome first entered the Japanese Formula 3000 series in 1987, using a March chassis, but had plans to build its own chassis. Hayashi established a separate company, Jiotto Design, as a design department for Dome. As a result of this progress, Marco Apicella won the 1994 championship driving the Dome F104 chassis equipped with a Mugen Honda engine. Jiotto's facilities included a 25 per cent wind tunnel, computer-aided design and computer-aided manufacturing equipment, and several autoclaves: all of which could be used to design and construct a more complicated Formula One car.

In 1995, the former team manager of the Minardi Formula One team, Tadashi Sasaki, joined Dome. Sasaki organised a Formula One project which was announced in the autumn of that year. Akiyoshi Oku, who had designed the F104 F3000 car, began work on the new F105 chassis in the summer of 1995. Sasaki's influence was crucial, as he was in a position to buy Minardi's old gearbox and hydraulic systems to use on the F105. The transmission was a six-speed semi-automatic gearbox designed by Xtrac, and had previously been used, in addition to the Minardi team, by the unraced DAMS GD-01 car and formerly in the Simtek S941 chassis during the 1994 season. In terms of the car's engine, Dome's success with Mugen Honda engines in the Japanese racing scene ensured that the F105 would be powered by the company's MF301 V10 engine, as used by the Ligier team during the 1995 Formula One season. Dome's close association with Mugen (an independent engine tuner closely linked to Honda), sparked rumours that the Japanese company was using the Dome F105 project as a discreet evaluation of a return to Formula One after its own withdrawal from the sport at the end of the 1992 season. Dome has denied that this was the case, insisting that it was an independent effort.

The F105 was, like any Formula One car of its time, constructed around a carbon-fibre monocoque. It featured a conventional double wishbone suspension arrangement with pushrod-actuated dampers provided by Showa. Dome reached an agreement with Goodyear for tyres, although this was almost scuppered when the American company suspected that the F105 project was a ruse constructed by Japanese rival Bridgestone, which had announced its own intention to enter Formula One in 1997, to acquire information about its tyres. The F105 ran on magnesium wheels made by Rays, with dimensions of 11 inches (28 cm) by 13 inches (33 cm) at the front, and 14 inches (36 cm) by 13 inches (33 cm) at the rear. It also featured one-piece bodywork covering the sidepods and engine cover. The F105 was liveried in traditional Japanese white with a fluorescent yellow stripe around the cockpit and engine cover, and had minimal sponsorship. The car was completed on March 17, 1996.

== Testing ==
The F105 was launched at the Spiral building in Tokyo on March 18, 1996. Marco Apicella, who had won the 1994 Japanese Formula 3000 championship with Dome, and local drivers Naoki Hattori and Shinji Nakano were selected as the project's test drivers. Apicella and Hattori both had brief experience of competing in F1, whilst Nakano was a Honda protégé who was driving for Dome in F3000. The F105 was tested for the first time at the Japanese Mine circuit in the spring of 1996, driven by Nakano, before the programme moved to Suzuka in the hands of Apicella. By April, the F105 had completed 550 kilometres (340 mi) and its engine was replaced with a new one. The car reached the 900 kilometres (560 mi) mark in May, by which time a baseline setup had been established. Apicella reported that it tended to oversteer at the entry to corners, understeer on exit, the aerodynamic balance was unstable, and that the car's brakes were spongy. A more serious problem occurred during one of the testing sessions at Suzuka when an oil leak stranded the car out on the circuit and caused a major fire which extensively damaged the F105 chassis.

Dome planned to establish a European test base during the summer of 1996 and run at several European circuits on the calendar of the 1996 Formula One season, but this plan never came to fruition due to a shortage of funding. The team did, however, test at Suzuka shortly after the season-ending 1996 Japanese Grand Prix at the circuit. Hattori set a best time of 1:46.270, which was more than seven seconds slower than Jacques Villeneuve's pole position time of 1:38.909 set in the Williams FW18 chassis. It was also 0.3 seconds slower than the 107% cut-off mark for qualification, although it is expected that lap times would have been lower with a better driver.

Dome's lack of sponsorship eventually forced it to cancel its plans to enter the 1997 Formula One season in the autumn of 1996. Nakano left the project and was promoted to Formula One with the Prost (formerly Ligier) team, which was equipped with Mugen engines. Sasaki attempted to obtain funding to compete in the 1998 season and beyond from a variety of sources, including the Nigerian Prince Malik Ado-Ibrahim, who eventually invested in the Arrows team instead after negotiations with Honda for a fresh supply of engines fell through. The 1998 season also saw changes to the sport's technical regulations which rendered the F105 obsolete. In 1999, Sasaki entered negotiations with a Dutch company and plans were made to put the ageing F105 through another testing programme before building a revised F106 chassis, but the company insisted that the chassis be equipped with a Honda engine. At this point, Honda was in the process of evaluating a full-scale return to the sport with the test Honda RA099 chassis, and ultimately through the supply of works engines to the British American Racing team for the 2000 season, and was unwilling to supply a new customer team in addition to these commitments. As a result, Dome definitively abandoned its Formula One ambitions and has concentrated on the Japanese racing scene and sports car racing in the 21st century. The sole F105 chassis, still fitted with its Mugen engine, is currently stored beneath the wind tunnel at Dome's headquarters in Maibara.

== Video games ==
Two sim racing video games based on the project was released for the PlayStation:

- Dōmu no Yabō: F1 GP NIPPON no Chōsen (1996)
- Dōmu no Yabō 2: The Race of Champions (1998)

One game for PC released on Steam:

- Automobilista 2 (2020)
