= Strakka-Dome S103 =

British race car model

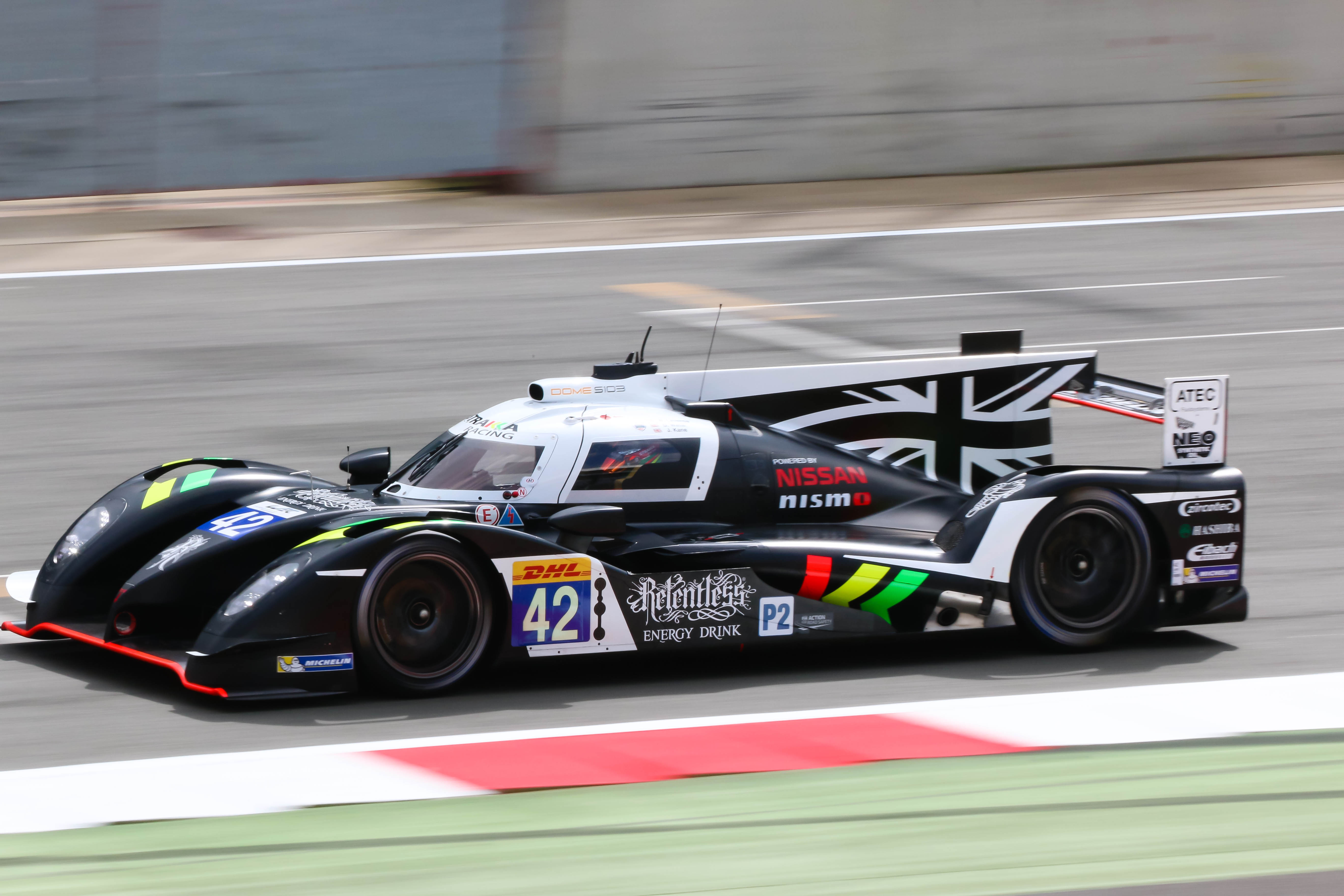
- #42 Strakka Racing Strakka-Dome S103
- Category: Le Mans Prototype (LMP2)
- Constructor: Dome Co. LTD
- Designer: Hiroshi Yuchi
- Predecessor: Dome S102

Technical specifications
- Chassis: Carbon fibre monocoque
- Suspension (front): Double wishbone, Pushrod, 2 Corner with Dome Dampers
- Suspension (rear): As Front
- Engine: Nissan VK45DE 90º 4.5L V8 Naturally Aspirated
- Transmission: Xtrac 6-Speed
- Weight: 900kg
- Tyres: Michelin

Competition history
- Notable entrants: (United Kingdom) Strakka Racing
- Notable drivers: (United Kingdom) Nick Leventis (United Kingdom) Jonny Kane (United Kingdom) Danny Watts
- Debut: 2015 6 Hours of Silverstone
Races	Wins	Podiums	Poles
3	0	1	0
- Teams' Championships: 0
- Drivers' Championships: 0

The Strakka-Dome S103 is a Le Mans Prototype LMP2, built to the ACO/FIA Le Mans Prototype LMP2 Regulations. The car was originally eligible for use in the FIA World Endurance Championship, European Le Mans Series, Asian Le Mans Series as well as the IMSA sanctioned WeatherTech Sportscar Championship. Following the 2017 rule changes for the class, the car is no longer eligible for use in the FIA World Endurance Championship, the WeatherTech Sportscar Championship and the European Le Mans Series. However, it is still eligible for use in the LMP2-Am Asian Le Mans Series.

== Development ==
=== Initial Development (Dome S103) ===
In May 2013 Dome Co. Ltd announced the development of the Dome S103, with the first concept sketches of the car being released online. The car was announced as meeting both the 2014 LMP1 and LMP2 Technical regulations, and was developed in Computational Fluid Dynamics (CFD), along with a 50% scale wind tunnel model at the Furyusha Wind Tunnel in Japan.

On 27 November 2013 Dome and Strakka Racing agreed to a long-term partnership, agreeing to jointly develop, market, and race the Dome S103, in the LMP2 "low-cost" guise, with the car becoming known as the Strakka-Dome S103. The car was also announced to be powered by the Nissan VK45 4.5L V8 engine.

On 24 March 2013 Strakka Racing gave the car its first shakedown, at the Turweston Aerodrome, with Jonny Kane and Danny Watts at the wheel. This was before the original intended debut of the car at the 2014 6 Hours of Silverstone, the first round of the 2014 FIA World Endurance Championship.

However, on 15 April 2014 it was announced by team principal Nick Levantis that the car would miss the first 2 rounds of the 2014 FIA World Endurance Championship, due to teething problems and a lack of running of the car. The car was originally to debut at Le Mans, but this was subsequently cancelled, due to extensive revisions to the rear geometry of the car, and long lead times for the parts to arrive, alongside a desire to complete a further test programme. Ultimately, the car would not race in 2014, after a planned debut at the 6 Hours of Sao Paulo failed, due to a homologation issue with the headrest of the car, in spite of the car running well at a preparation test for its intended debut, covering 3500 km at the Hungaroring.

Prior to the cars debut at the 2015 6 Hours of Silverstone, the car had testing at the Motorland Aragon, completing over 4000 km of running. The car was then launched at the FIA WEC Prologue at the Circuit Paul Ricard, on 26 March 2015.

=== Strakka S103B LMP1 ===
Following the decision to switch to the Gibson 015S chassis, following the LMP2 regulation change for 2017, a separate effort began to convert the Dome S103 to the Strakka S103B, which would run in the LMP1 class.

A tightly budgeted two-year LMP1 programme was launched in the wake of the regulation change, with design and engine supply discussions progressing prior to the program's cancellation. Owing to the escalating costs of logistics in the World Endurance Championship, and fuel flow regulations in LMP1 requiring expensive fuel metering systems, the programme was cancelled.

== Competition History ==
=== 2014 ===
Due to the numerous testing and homologation issues faced by the car, the car was unable to race.

=== 2015 ===
On its debut at the 2015 6 Hours of Silverstone, the car finished P4 on the road. It was subsequently elevated to a P3 finish, after the #30 Tequila Patron ESM car which originally finished P3 failed post-race scrutineering. The car qualified P7 at the 6 Hours of Spa Francorchamps, and finished in P5. The car was subsequently shelved in favour of the Gibson 015S, with the team electing to use the car as a developmental mule for its proposed 2017 LMP1 project. The LMP1 project would be subsequently shelved by the team, and the car would never be returned to competition.

No	Team	Car	(United Kingdom) SIL	(Belgium) SPA	(France) LMS	(Germany) NÜR	(United States) COA	(Japan) FUJ	(China) SHA	(Bahrain) BHR	Total points	Pos.
42	(United Kingdom) Strakka Racing	Strakka-Dome S103	3	5	Ret						63	6th
42	(United Kingdom) Strakka Racing	Gibson 015S				7	7	6	6	5	63	6th
