= Dome S102 =

Japanese sports car prototype

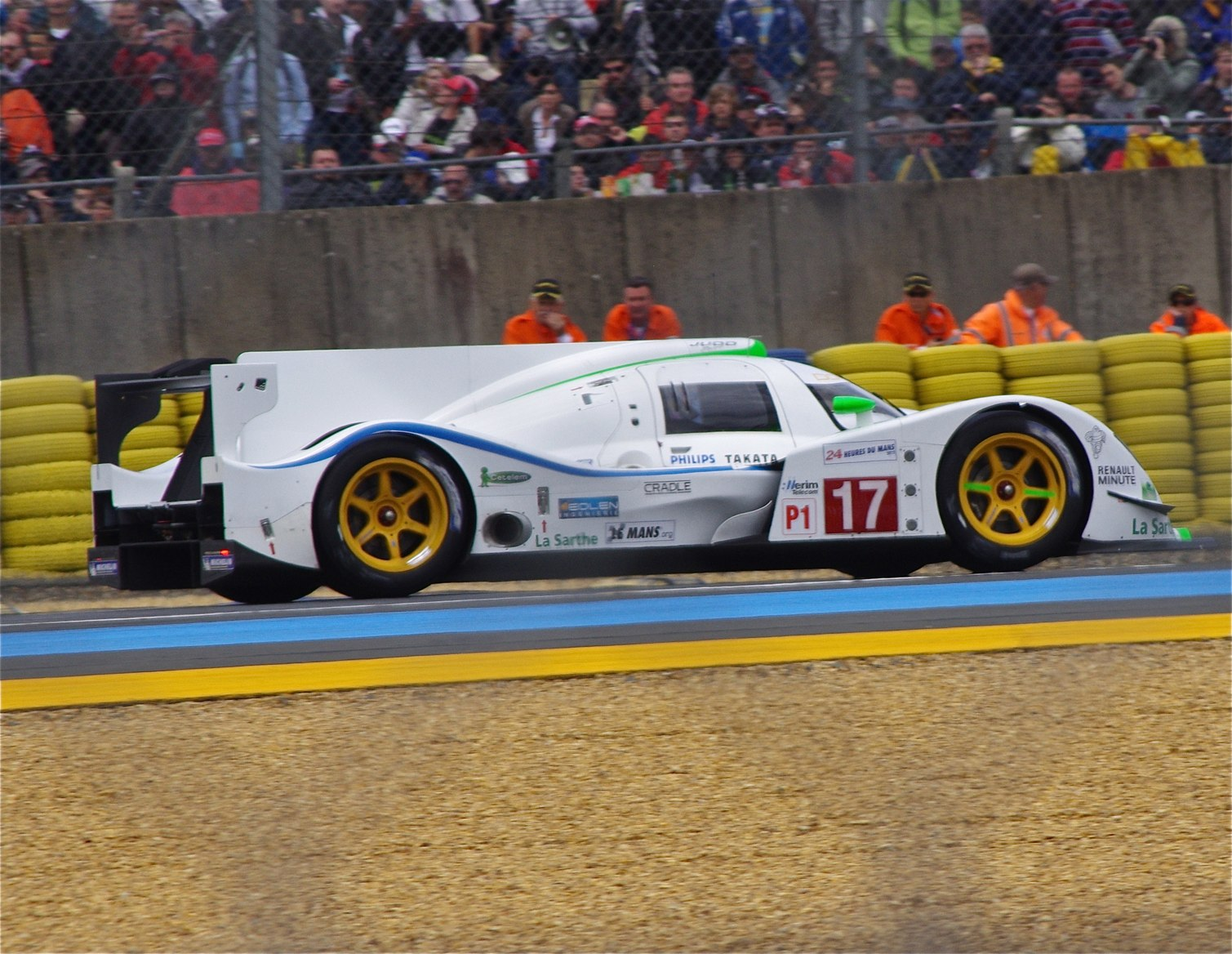
- #17 Pescarolo Team Dome S102.5 2012 24 Hours of Le Mans
- Category: Le Mans Prototype (LMP1)
- Constructor: Dome Co. LTD
- Designer: Hiroshi Yuchi
- Predecessor: Dome S101
- Successor: Strakka-Dome S103

Technical specifications
- Chassis: Carbon fibre monocoque
- Suspension (front): Double Wishbone twin-damper pullrod
- Suspension (rear): As Front
- Length: 4650mm
- Width: 1995mm
- Height: Dome S102: 920mm Dome S102.5: 1025mm
- Wheelbase: 2900mm
- Engine: Dome S102:Judd GV5 5.5L NA V10; Dome S102.5:Judd DB 3.4L NA V8
- Transmission: X-Trac 6 Speed
- Weight: 900kg
- Brakes: Dome S102: Alcon Calipers/Carbone Industrie Pads & Rotor; Dome S102.5: Alcon Calipers/Brembo Pads & Rotor
- Tyres: Michelin

Competition history
- Notable entrants: (Japan) Dome Racing Team (France) Pescarolo Team
- Notable drivers: (France) Nicolas Minassian (France) Sébastien Bourdais (Japan) Seiji Ara (Japan) Daisuke Itō (Japan) Yuji Tachikawa (Japan) Tatsuya Kataoka
Races	Wins	Poles	F/Laps
3	0	0	0
- Teams' Championships: 0
- Drivers' Championships: 0

The Dome S102, later upgraded and raced as the Dome S102.5, is a sports prototype built and designed for use in the LMP1 class of the 24 Hours Of Le Mans, and other similar endurance races. The car is the successor to the Dome S101, and its later evolutions. The car was unveiled on 21 March 2008.

== Development ==
=== Dome S102 ===
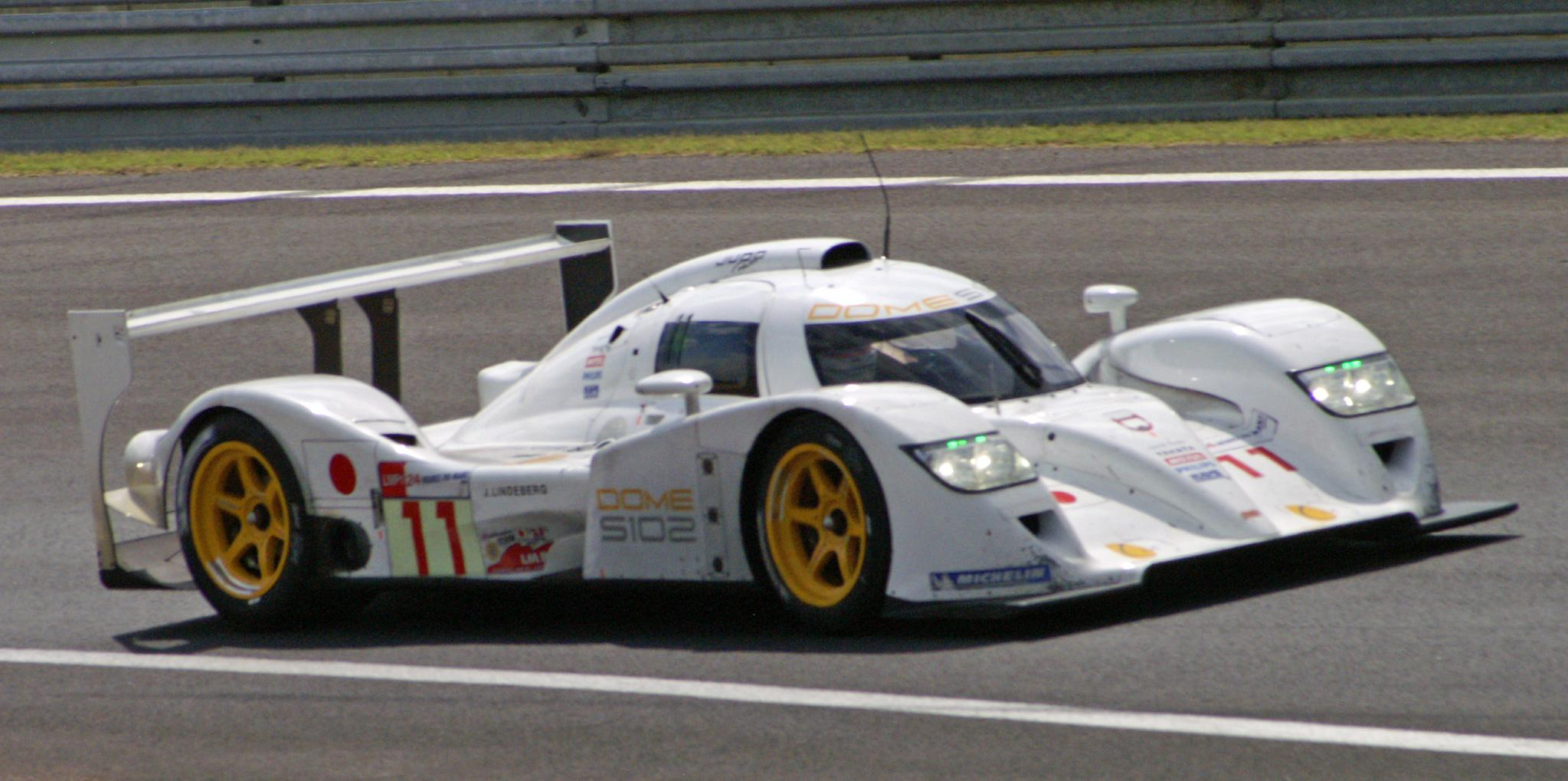
The #11 Dome Racing Team Dome S102-Judd, 2008 24 Hours of Le Mans

The Dome S102 is designed to be the successor to the open-topped Dome S101, featuring improved aerodynamics compared to the final iteration of the S101, with 9% Less Drag, as well as 11% More Aerodynamic Efficiency. The car was developed in-house, with 2 wind-tunnel models, one at 25% scale, alongside a larger 40% scale model. The 25% scale model was run at the Yajima Wind Tunnel. In order to test the reliability of the car's powertrain components, namely the Judd engine, as well as the X-Trac Transmission and the Zytek Paddle-shift system, Dome modified 1 Dome S101.5 into a testing mule, with the modified car being tested around Sportsland SUGO over a 2-day period, with Tatsuya Kataoka at the wheel. The car subsequently had its initial shakedown run at the Suzuka Circuit. The car was also tested at the Fuji Speedway.

=== Dome S102.5 ===
Over the winter of 2011, the 40% scale model was updated, in preparation for the car's return to competition, with redesigned front fenders, wider front tyres, as well as an engine cover fin. The Judd V10 was replaced with a smaller 3.4L Judd V8, with the car requiring a spacer plate in the engine bay to accommodate the newer engine. On the 2nd of February 2012, it was announced that the Dome S102 would return to competition, upgraded as the Dome S102.5, and to be run by the Pescarolo Team. The new DOME S102.5 was then given its shakedown run by the Pescarolo Team at Chateauroux Airport. The car was also tested at the Navarra Racetrack in Spain, with the team giving positive feedback about the car.

== Competition History ==
=== 2008 ===
The car had its debut at the 2008 24 Hours of Le Mans, with a single car, the #11 run by the factory Dome Racing Team. The car qualified well, with a P8, behind the 3rd Audi R10. The car was the last classified finisher in the race, completing 272 laps.

=== 2009 ===
The car was originally slated to be run in 2009 by the Ecospeed Team. However, due to the lack of payments to Dome, the contract was subsequently cancelled.

=== 2010 ===
The Dome Racing Team successfully received an entry for the 2010 24 Hours of Le Mans. However, it was subsequently withdrawn.

=== 2012 ===
The #17 car qualified P9 on its debut at the 2012 6 Hours of Spa Francorchamps, finishing 15th Overall, completing 147 laps. At the 2012 24 Hours of Le Mans, the car qualified 10th, but was unclassified, completing just 203 laps. This race would prove to be the last for both Pescarolo, who would collapse due to financial issues, and the car, in spite of Dome continuing development.

=== 24 Hours of Le Mans ===
Year	Entrant	#	Drivers	Class	Laps	Pos	Class Position
2008	(Japan) Dome Racing Team	11	(Japan) Daisuke Itō (Japan) Yuji Tachikawa (Japan) Tatsuya Kataoka	LMP1	272	33th	13th
2012	(France) Pescarolo Team	17	(France) Nicolas Minassian (France) Sébastien Bourdais (Japan) Seiji Ara	LMP1	203	NC	NC
