= Jiotto Caspita =

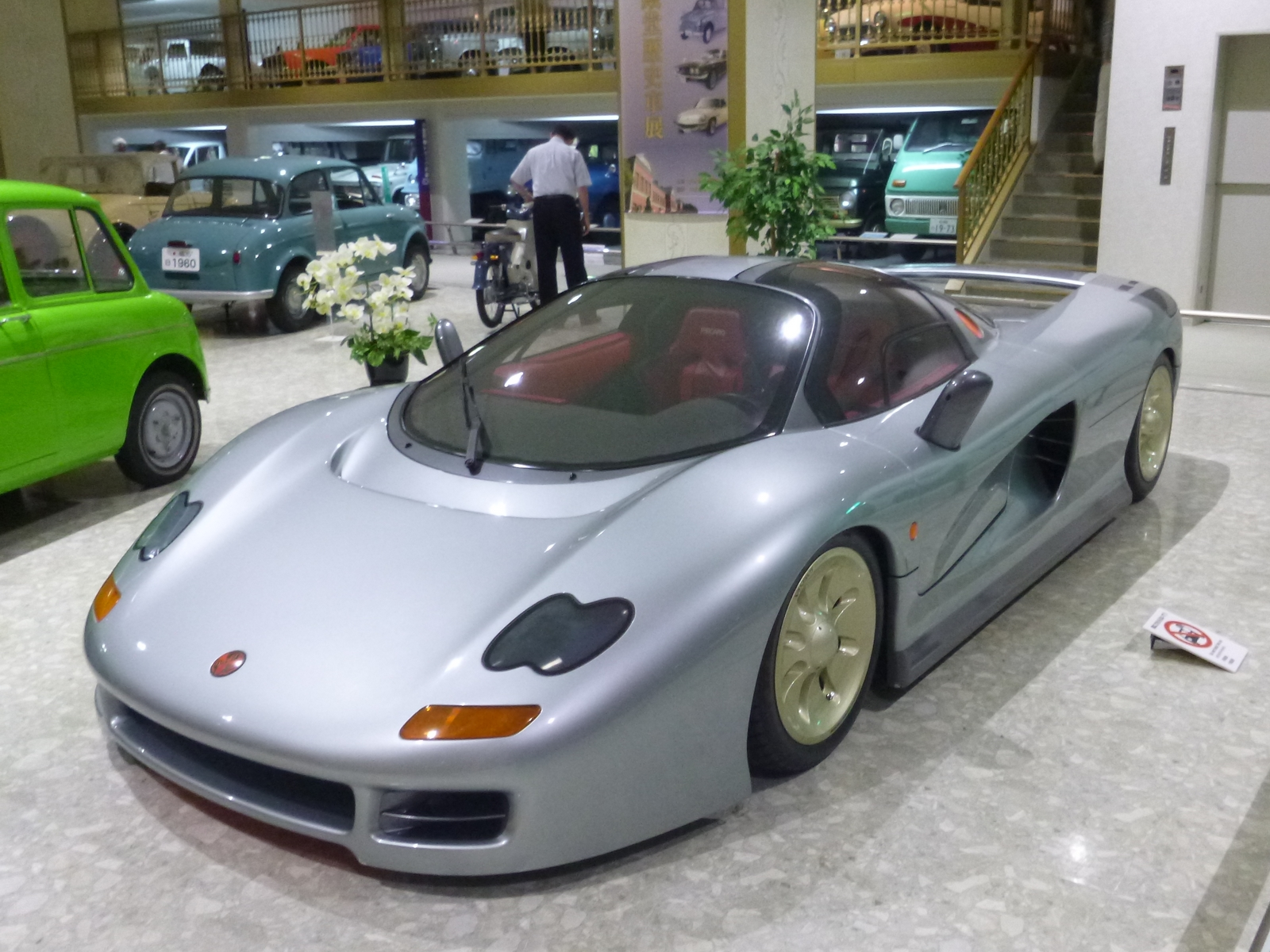
- 1989 Jiotto Caspita (Mk. I) on display

Overview
- Manufacturer: Dome Co. Ltd.
- Production: 1989 (Mk. I); 1990 (Mk. II)
- Assembly: Japan: Maihara
- Designer: Kunihisa Ito

Body and chassis
- Class: Concept car Sports car (S)
- Body style: 2-door coupé
- Layout: Longitudinal rear mid-engine, rear-wheel drive
- Doors: 2

Powertrain
- Engine: 3.5 L Motori Moderni 1235 F12 (Mk. I); 3.5 L Judd GV 72-degree V10 (Mk. II)
- Transmission: 6-speed manual

Dimensions
- Wheelbase: 2,700 mm (106.3 in)
- Length: 4,534 mm (178.5 in); 4,595 mm (180.9 in) (Mk II)
- Width: 1,996 mm (78.6 in)
- Height: 1,135 mm (44.7 in)
- Curb weight: 2,425 lb (1,100 kg); 2,734 lb (1,240 kg) (Mk II)

Chronology
- Predecessor: Dome Zero

The Jiotto Caspita is a prototype mid-engine sports car designed and manufactured by Dome in 1989. The car was billed as the "F1 on the Road". The original design of the car was done by Kunihisa Ito, who was the vice president and chief designer of Jiotto Design Incorporated. Its name is derived from the Italian exclamation "caspita".

== History ==
The Caspita was the brainchild of Wacoal president Yoshikata Tsukamoto and Dome president Minoru Hayashi. A joint venture between the two companies was formed in July 1988 by the name of Jiotto Inc. (60% held by Wacoal and 40% held by DOME) to design and build the car. The engineering was entrusted to Dome, while the newly incorporated Jiotto Design studio was tasked with designing the car.

The Caspita was displayed at the 28th Tokyo Motor Show in 1989. In light of positive reception, a limited production run of 30 units was considered, but never came to fruition. The project would die out in 1993 due to the collapse of the Japanese asset price bubble, which resulted in a lack of demand for sports cars.

The Mk. I Caspita is currently on display at the Motorcar Museum of Japan in Komatsu, whilst the Mk. II remains in possession of Dome and sits in their museum below the wind tunnel at their headquarters.

=== Design ===
The car had a sleek and aerodynamic body design inspired by Group C race cars. Design mockups of 1/5 scale were made for wind tunnel testing. Later, full-size models were made and tested at Dome's own wind tunnel as well as the JARI (Japan Automobile Research Institute) wind tunnel for aerodynamic refinement. Jiotto Design selected three design proposals out of the initially proposed 200 for final development. Out of the three, a design having an integrated rear wing and large side air intakes was fully developed.

The Mk. II Caspita was partially restyled with new twin circular taillights, circular headlights, and more traditionally styled side-view mirrors.

==== Powertrain ====
The Mk. I Caspita was built with a detuned Subaru 1235 flat-twelve engine, a Formula One engine originally built by Motori Moderni for Subaru and rated at 450 hp (336 kW; 456 PS) and 363 N⋅m (268 lb⋅ft); it could accelerate the car to 100 km/h from a standstill in 4.7 seconds. After the failure of Subaru's F1 effort, the 1235 was abandoned, leaving Jiotto without an engine supplier.

The Mk. II used a Judd GV V10 engine, with which it was capable of 585 hp (436 kW) at 10,500 rpm and 374 N⋅m (276 lb⋅ft) of torque at 10,500 rpm. This, combined with a curb weight of between 1,240 kg (2,730 lb) and 1,260 kg (2,780 lb), gave the Caspita a claimed 0-100 km/h acceleration time of 3.4 seconds.

Both engines were longitudinally mounted and coupled to a 6-speed gearbox built by Weismann.

==== Chassis ====
The Caspita had a bonded aluminium and carbon fibre monocoque chassis made by Mitsubishi Rayon Co., Ltd. The construction technique involved sandwiching aluminium between layers of carbon fibre and curing them in an autoclave to create a rigid structure. The process was repeated 15 times over a span of more than 2 months. This technique resulted in a kerb weight of 1,100 kg (2,425 lb) for the Mk. I Caspita.

Accessed via two gull-wing doors, the Caspita's red-and-black interior was driver-focused and spartan in nature, with no air conditioning, cruise control, or other such driver amenities.

Like its Tokyo Motor Show contemporaries the Mitsubishi HSR-II and Isuzu 4200R, the Caspita employed advanced technology for the time, such as an electronically retractable rear wing and an electronically controlled adjustable suspension system which could raise the car by 2.3 in (58.4 mm).

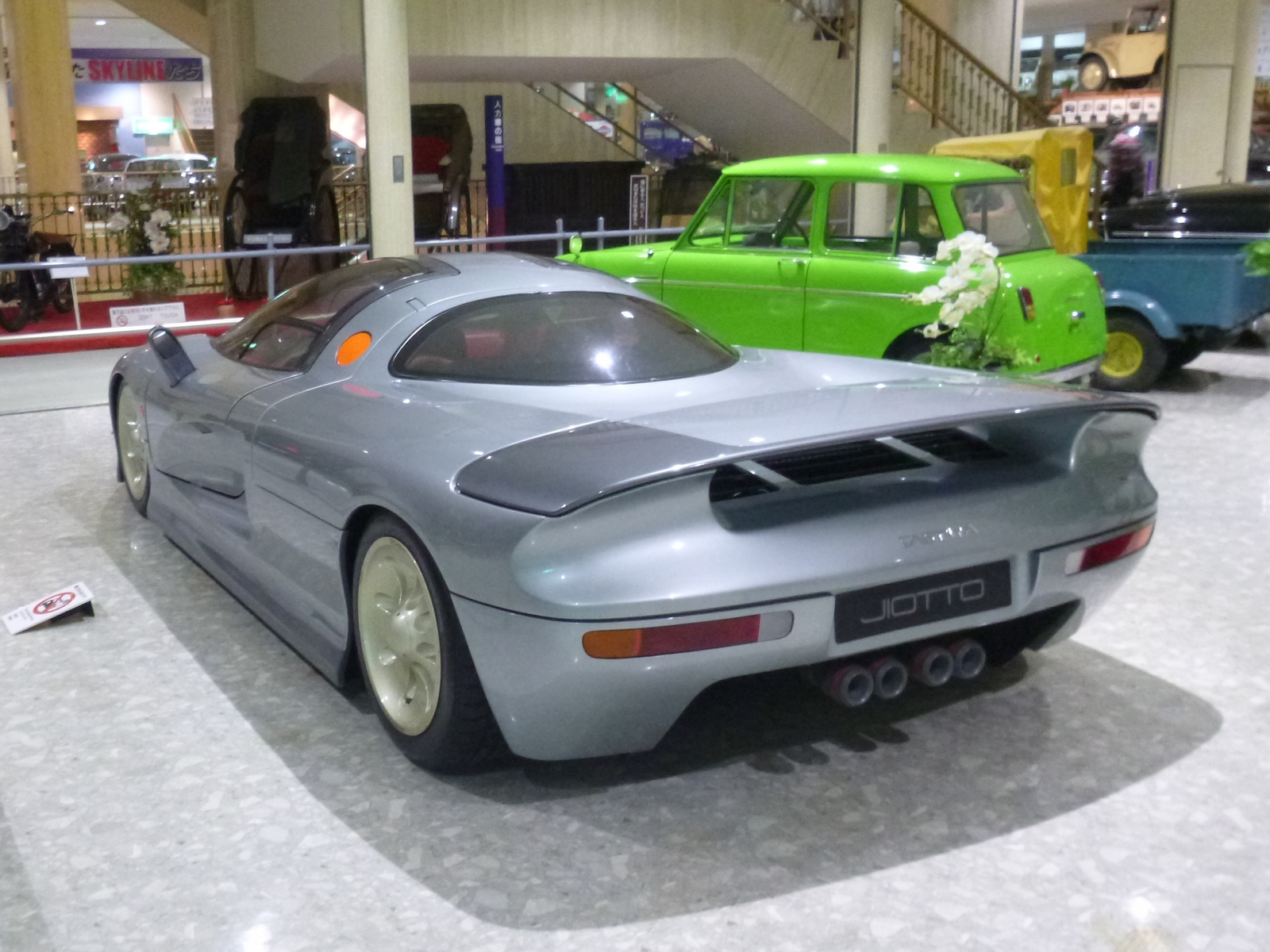
1989 Jiotto Caspita (Mk. I) rear

== Specifications (1989 Mk. I Caspita) ==
=== Dimensions ===
Wheelbase	2,700 mm (106.3 in)
Front track	1,630 mm (64.2 in)
Rear track	1,600 mm (63.0 in)
Length	4,534 mm (178.5 in)
Width	1,996 mm (78.6 in)
Height	1,135 mm (44.7 in)
Kerb weight	1,100 kg (2,425 lb)
Weight distribution (F/R)	40/60
Fuel tank capacity	100 L (26 US gal; 22 imp gal)
Wheel sizes	9JJ x 17 (front), 13JJ x 17 (rear)
Tyre sizes	245/40 ZR17 (front), 335/35 ZR17 (rear)
Brake size	332 mm (13.1 in)

=== Powertrain ===
Manufacturer	Motori Moderni
Configuration	Flat-12
Valve type	DOHC 5-valve
Bore	84 mm (3.3 in)
Stroke	52.6 mm (2.1 in)
Total displacement	3,497 cc (213.4 cu in)
Specific displacement	291.4 cc (17.8 cu in)
Aspiration	Natural aspiration
Fuel system	Electronic fuel injection
Maximum power	456 PS (335.4 kW; 449.8 hp) @ 10,000 rpm
Maximum torque	362 N⋅m (267 lb⋅ft) @ 6,000 rpm
Specific power output	130 PS (95.6 kW; 128.2 hp) per litre
Specific torque output	103.5 N⋅m (76.3 lb⋅ft) per litre

=== Performance ===
0-100 km/h (62 mph)	4.7 seconds
Top speed	320 km/h (199 mph)
Power-to-weight ratio	415 PS (305.2 kW; 409.3 hp) per metric ton

=== Other ===
Suspension type	Independent coil-sprung double-wishbone with anti-roll bars (front and rear)
Brake type	Ventilated disc
Steering type	Rack and pinion
Transmission type	6-speed manual
Top gear ratio	1.00
Final drive ratio	3.75

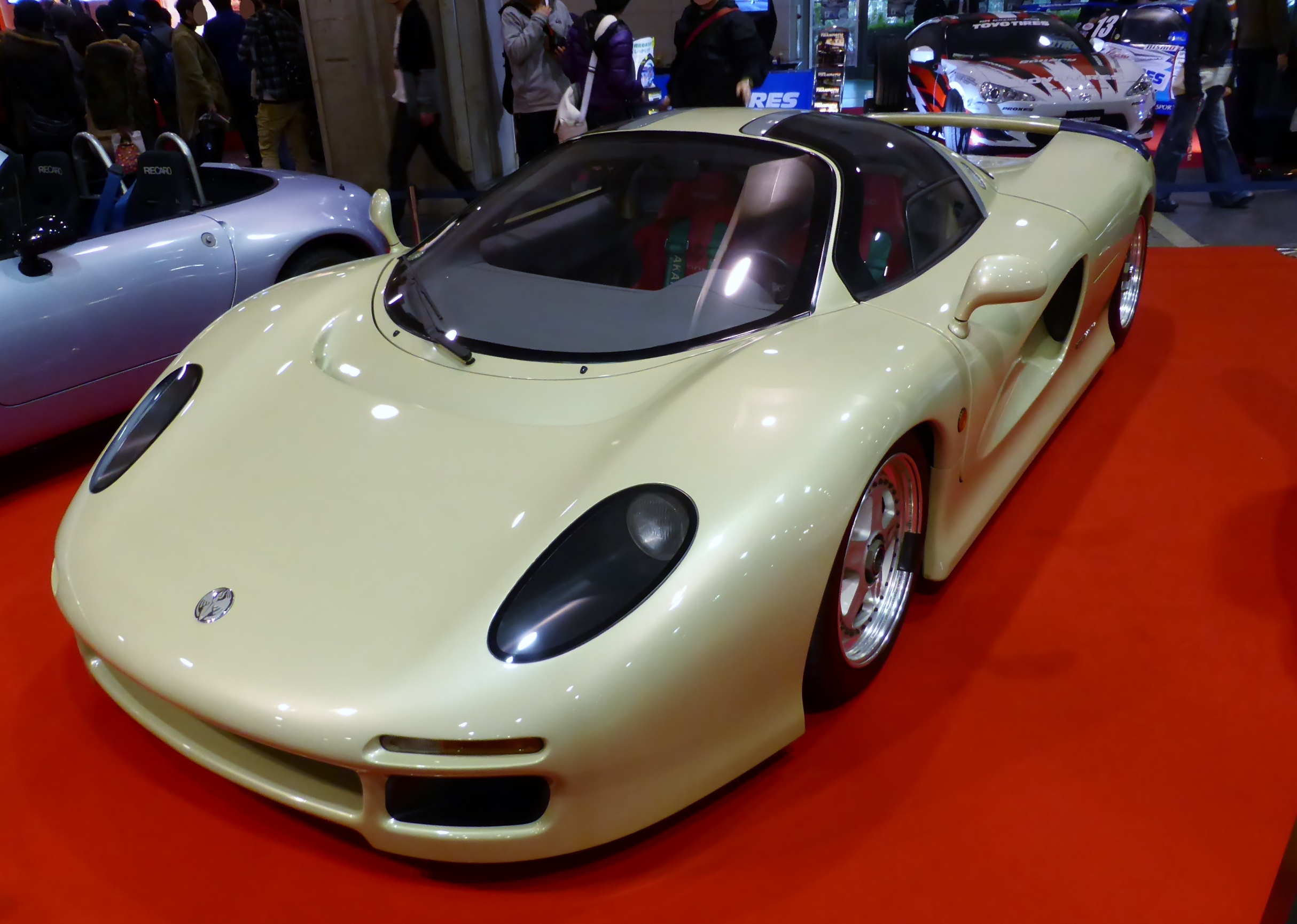
1990 Jiotto Caspita (Mk. II) front

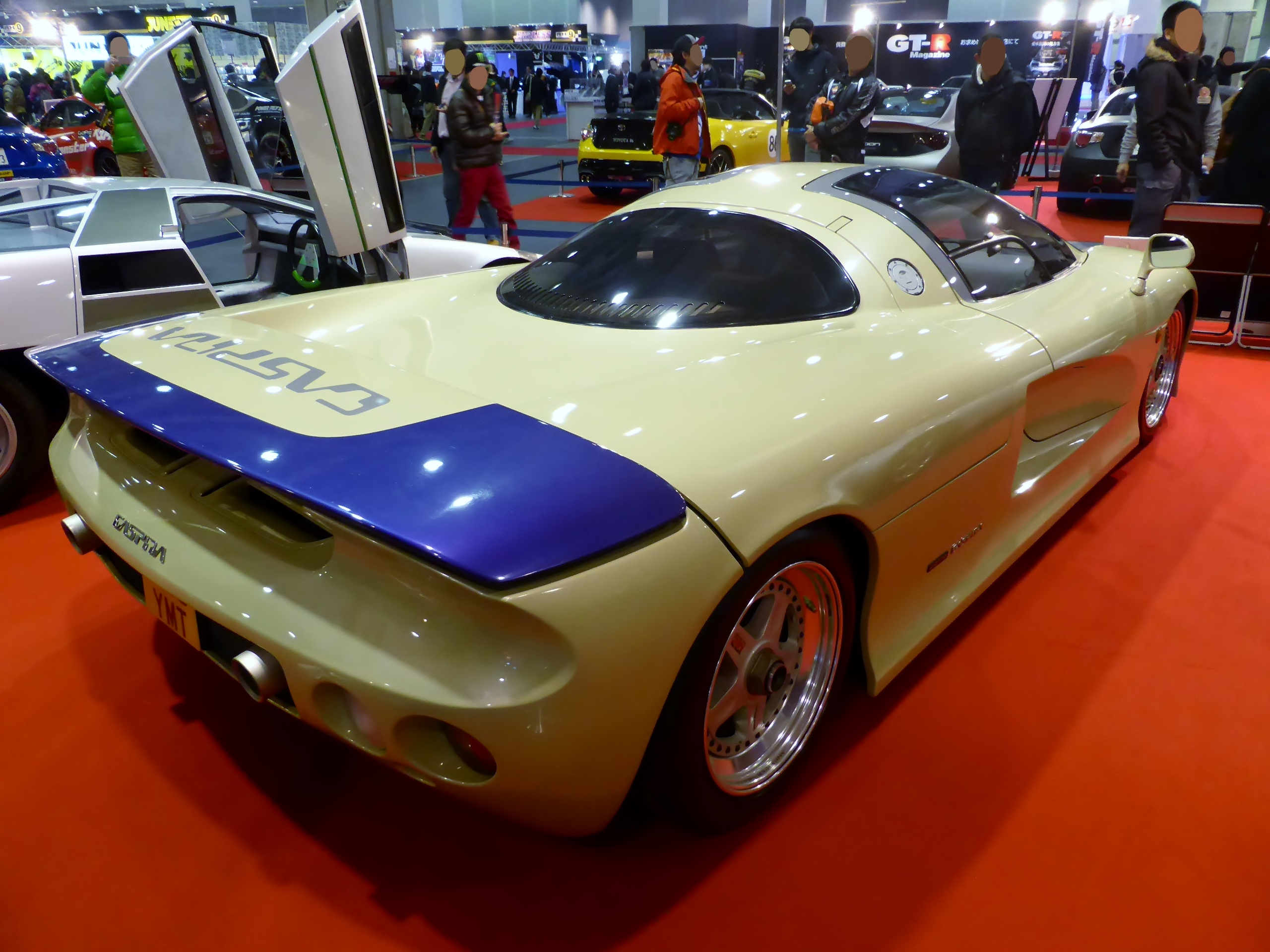
1990 Jiotto Caspita (Mk. II) rear

== Specifications (1990 Mk. II Caspita) ==
=== Dimensions ===
Wheelbase	2,700 mm (106.3 in)
Front track	1,630 mm (64.2 in)
Rear track	1,600 mm (63.0 in)
Length	4,595 mm (180.9 in)
Width	1,996 mm (78.6 in)
Height	1,135 mm (44.7 in)
Kerb weight	unknown; between 1,240 kg (2,730 lb) and 1,260 kg (2,780 lb)
Weight distribution (F/R)	40/60
Fuel tank capacity	100 L (26 US gal; 22 imp gal)
Wheel sizes	9JJ x 17 (front), 13JJ x 17 (rear)
Tyre sizes	245/40 ZR17 (front), 335/35 ZR17 (rear)
Brake size	332 mm (13.1 in)

=== Engine ===
Manufacturer	Judd
Configuration	72-degree V10
Valve type	DOHC 4-valve
Bore	92 mm (3.6 in)
Stroke	52.6 mm (2.1 in)
Total displacement	3,497 cc (213.4 cu in)
Specific displacement	349.7 cc (21.3 cu in)
Aspiration	Natural aspiration
Fuel system	Electronic fuel injection
Maximum power	585 PS (430.3 kW; 577.0 hp) @ 10,750 rpm
Maximum torque	385 N⋅m (284 lb⋅ft) @ 10,500 rpm
Specific power output	167 PS (122.8 kW; 164.7 hp) per litre
Specific torque output	110.1 N⋅m (81.2 lb⋅ft) per litre

=== Performance ===
0-100 km/h (62 mph)	3.4 seconds (claimed)
Top speed	320 km/h (199 mph)
Power-to-weight ratio	415 PS (305.2 kW; 409.3 hp) per metric ton

=== Other ===
Suspension type	Independent coil-sprung double-wishbone with anti-roll bars (front and rear)
Brake type	Ventilated disc
Steering type	Rack and pinion
Transmission type	6-speed manual
Top gear ratio	1.00
Final drive ratio	3.75

== See also ==
- Dome Zero
- Yamaha OX99-11
- Aspark Owl
- McLaren F1
- Cizeta-Moroder V16T
- Bugatti EB 110
