= Dome Zero =

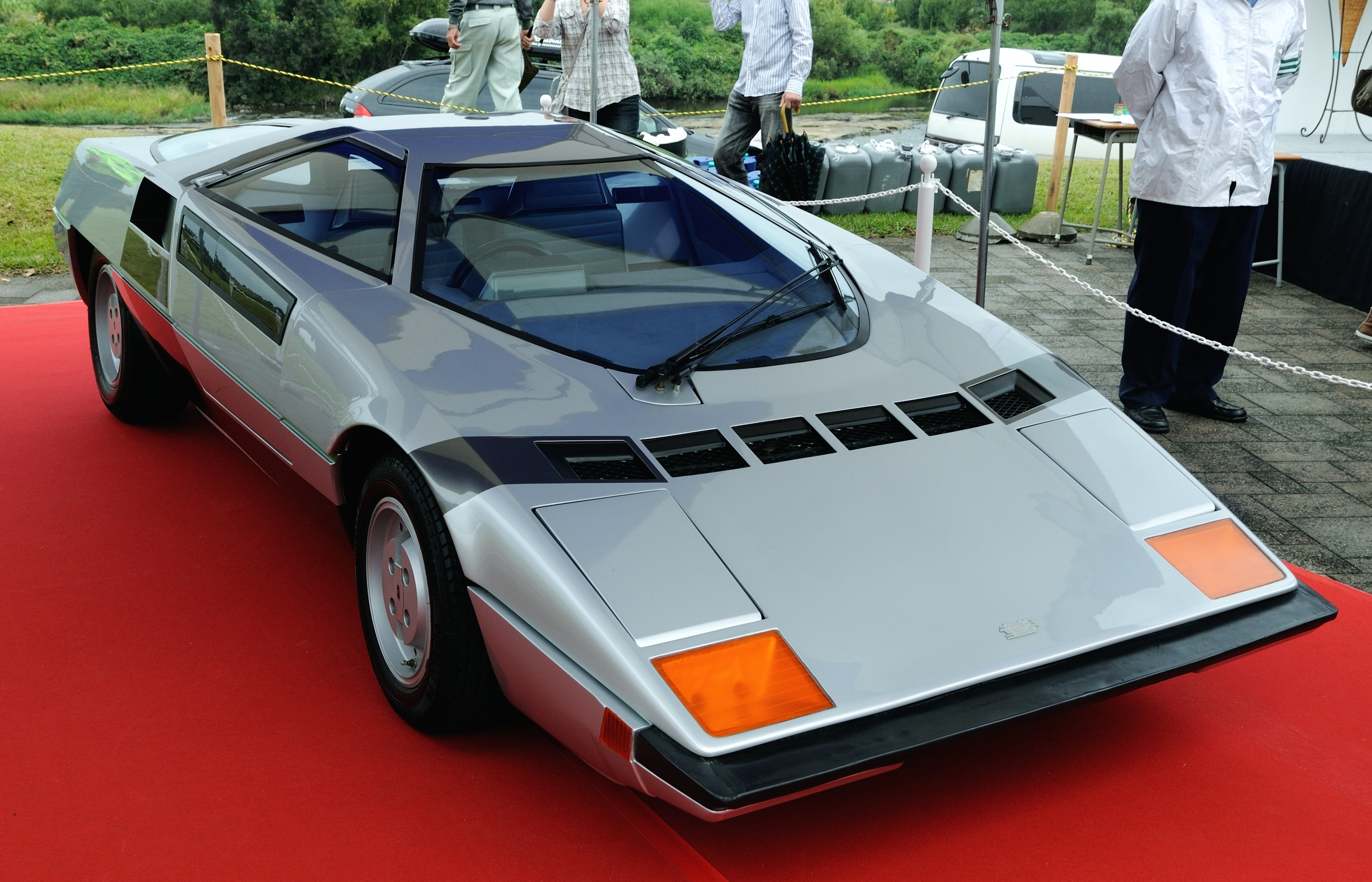

Overview
- Manufacturer: DOME Co. Ltd
- Production: 1978 (Zero); 1979 (Zero P2)
- Designer: Minoru Hayashi

Body and chassis
- Class: Concept car Sports car (S)
- Body style: 2-door coupé
- Doors: Scissor

Powertrain
- Engine: 2.8 L Nissan L28E I6
- Transmission: 5-speed manual

Dimensions
- Length: 3,980 mm (156.7 in)
- Width: 1,770 mm (69.7 in)
- Height: 980 mm (38.6 in)
- Curb weight: 920 kg (2,028 lb)

Chronology
- Successor: Jiotto Caspita

The Dome Zero (童夢-零, Dōmu Zero) was a prototype sports car from DOME Co. Ltd that was exhibited at the 48th Geneva Auto Show in 1978. The Dome project, pronounced "do-mu" or "child's dream" in Japanese, was started by Minoru Hayashi in 1975, with the goal of producing sports cars using knowledge gained from auto racing. The Zero was to be their first production road car and Dome planned to produce a limited number for sale in Japan. Despite multiple prototypes and homologation efforts, the Zero was never approved by regulatory bodies for sale in Japan or overseas. As a result, the project was not commercially viable and the Zero never entered series production.

== Road car prototypes ==
Design work on the Dome Zero began in 1976 and the prototype was completed in 1978. The creation of the car was motivated by Hayashi's desire to compete in the 24 Hours of Le Mans, a prospect that had full support from his employees, most of whom had professional backgrounds in auto racing. In addition to developing the Zero into a race car, Hayashi intended to fund entry into Le Mans competition by selling cars to the public.

The Dome Zero represented a technological leap forward for small-scale Japanese automakers. The unusual design of the Zero required an extensive engineering process, incorporating newly designed components and off-the-shelf items from other Japanese auto manufacturers. It had a wedge-shaped exterior reminiscent of the Lancia Stratos Zero, Lamborghini Countach and Ferrari Berlinetta Boxer. It was rear mid-engine, rear-wheel-drive layout with a chassis of square-section steel tube. The 2.8L Nissan L28E SOHC straight-six engine produced 143 hp (107 kW; 145 PS). This engine was also used in the Datsun 280Z and 280ZX. With this engine and a curb weight of 920 kg (2,028 lb), the Dome Zero offered a power-to-weight ratio that matched contemporary Porsche models. The prototype also incorporated a ZF 5-speed transmission, independent double-wishbone suspension and four-wheel disk brakes, mounted inboard at the rear. The front brake calipers were sourced from a Subaru Leone, the steering column sourced from a Honda Accord and the interior door pulls from a Toyota Celica.

The Dome Zero prototype was completed in time for the 48th Geneva Motor Show in 1978 where its design received attention from various investors and interested buyers. Despite this interest, the manufacturer was unable to achieve Japanese road certification for the prototype. This led to the creation of a second prototype road car for the international market, the Zero P2. It is not clear what the exact reasons were for Zero's failure to achieve Japanese homologation. However, homologation rules were very strict at that time in Japan, and Dome did not have the funds to sustain the long and costly homologation procedure that was routine for well-funded mainstream Japanese auto makers.

The Zero's appearance at the Geneva Motor Show resulted in Dome signing several deals with toy manufacturers to license the car's appearance. The funding from these deals enabled Dome to expand their headquarters and continue to develop road and racing cars.

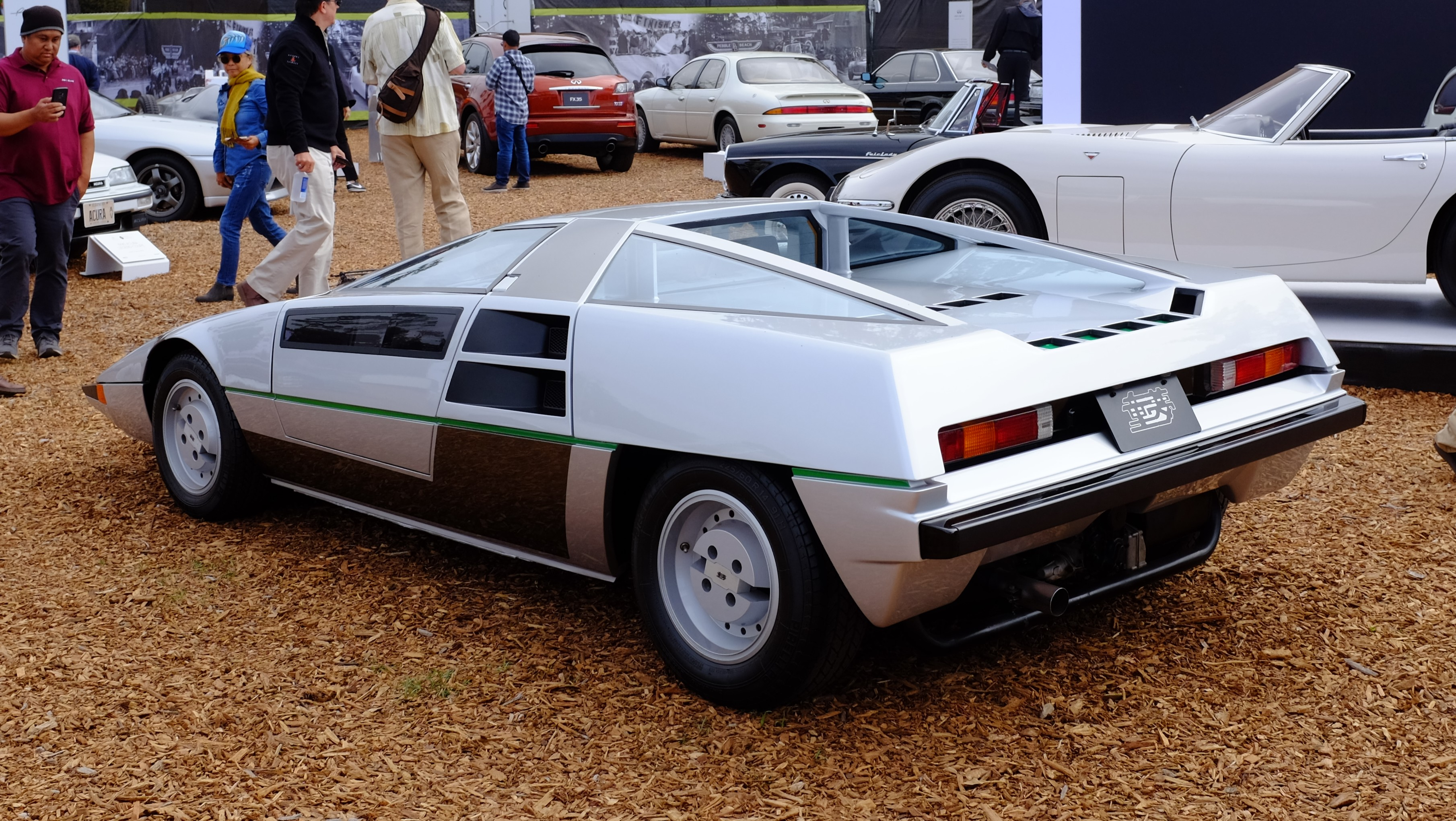
Rear view of the Dome Zero prototype

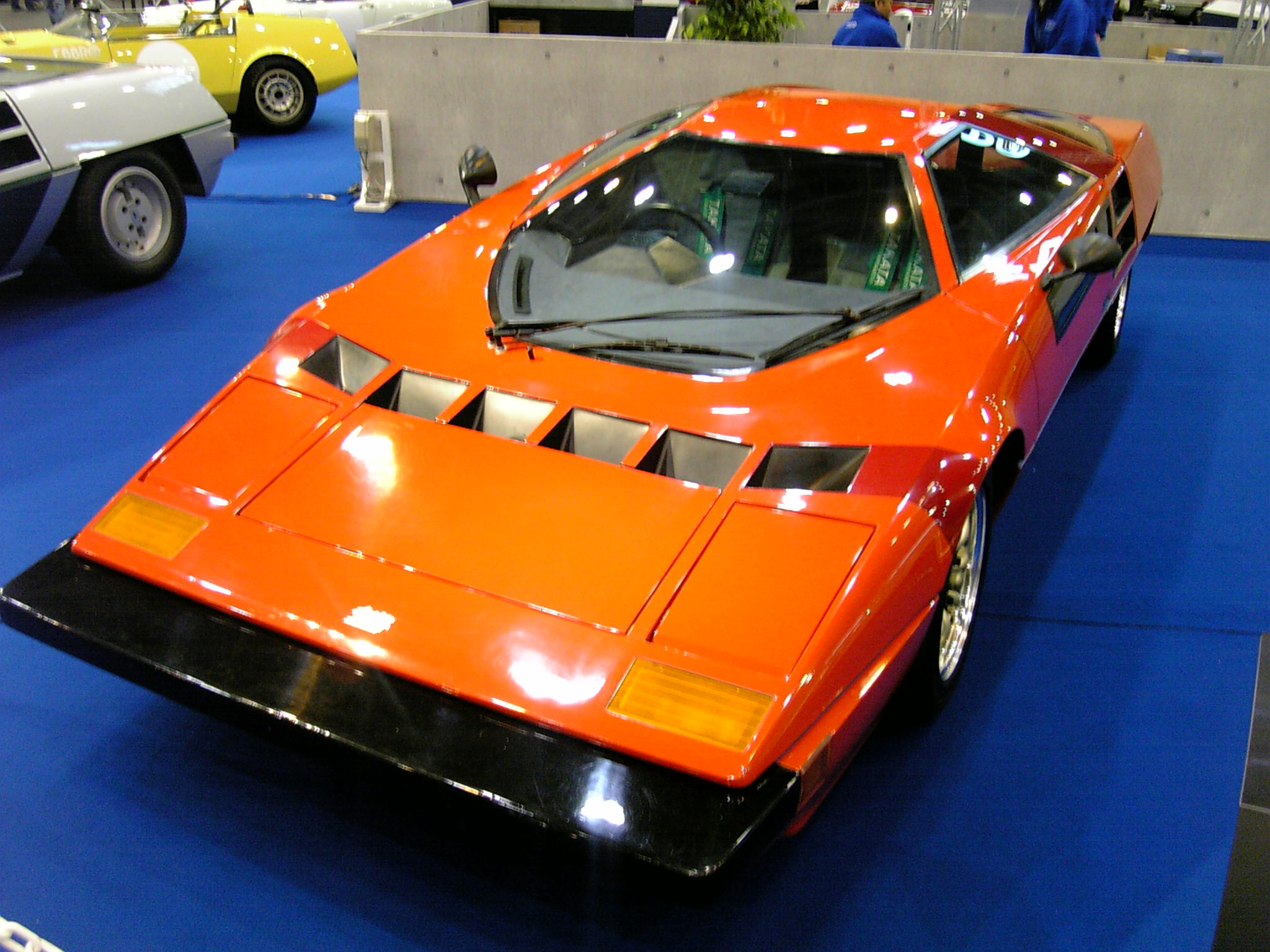
Dome Zero P2

=== Zero P2 ===
The original prototype's failure to achieve Japanese market homologation led to the development of the Dome Zero P2 prototype, a car made specifically for export and sale in countries such as the United States. Hayashi believed this would also allow sales to the Japanese market without regulatory approval. At the time, it was possible for Japanese buyers to obtain "export only" vehicles via grey market re-imports.

The P2 had large front and rear bumpers added (for the US market) and various other structural modifications which altered the appearance of the car. The P2 used the same Nissan L28E engine as the first prototype, but the press reported that turbocharged Nissan or Toyota straight-6 engines were being considered for production cars. The car was shown at the Chicago and Los Angeles motor shows in 1979 and was positively reviewed by Road & Track magazine.

When introduced, the Dome Zero P2 was estimated to have a retail price between US$30,000 to US$60,000. Efforts to homologate the P2 for sale in Japan and overseas failed, and it was never produced for commercial sale.

== Racing ==
Following difficulties with road homologation of the Zero, Hayashi decided to develop a race car, the Zero RL. This was intended to help publicize road cars and to realize Hayashi and his employees' ambitions of racing at the 24 Hours of Le Mans. The 1979 Zero RL was powered by a Cosworth DFV V8 engine with an aluminum twin-tube monocoque chassis. The dimensions of the car were unusual for a Le Mans prototype, with a very narrow track of 1,340 mm (52.7 in) and a long body, 16.4 ft (5.00 m). It is unclear the degree to which the Zero RL was derived from the road Zero, as chassis, body and engine all substantially differed from the road version.

The Zero RL first raced at the 1979 6 Hours of Silverstone, driven by Chris Craft and Gordon Spice. Although it was third-fastest in practice, the Zero RL finished 12th of 13. Two Zero RLs raced at the 1979 24 Hours of Le Mans motor race (#6, driven by Craft/Spice, #7 by Tony Trimmer/Bob Evans) but both failed to finish. Dome returned to Le Mans with new versions of the car in subsequent years. In the 1980 24 Hours of Le Mans the RL-80 was driven by Craft/Evans and did not finish. This was repeated at the 1981 24 Hours of Le Mans with Craft/Evans driving the RL-81 and again failing to finish. This ended Dome's racing efforts with the Zero RL, although the company would continue racing with other cars.

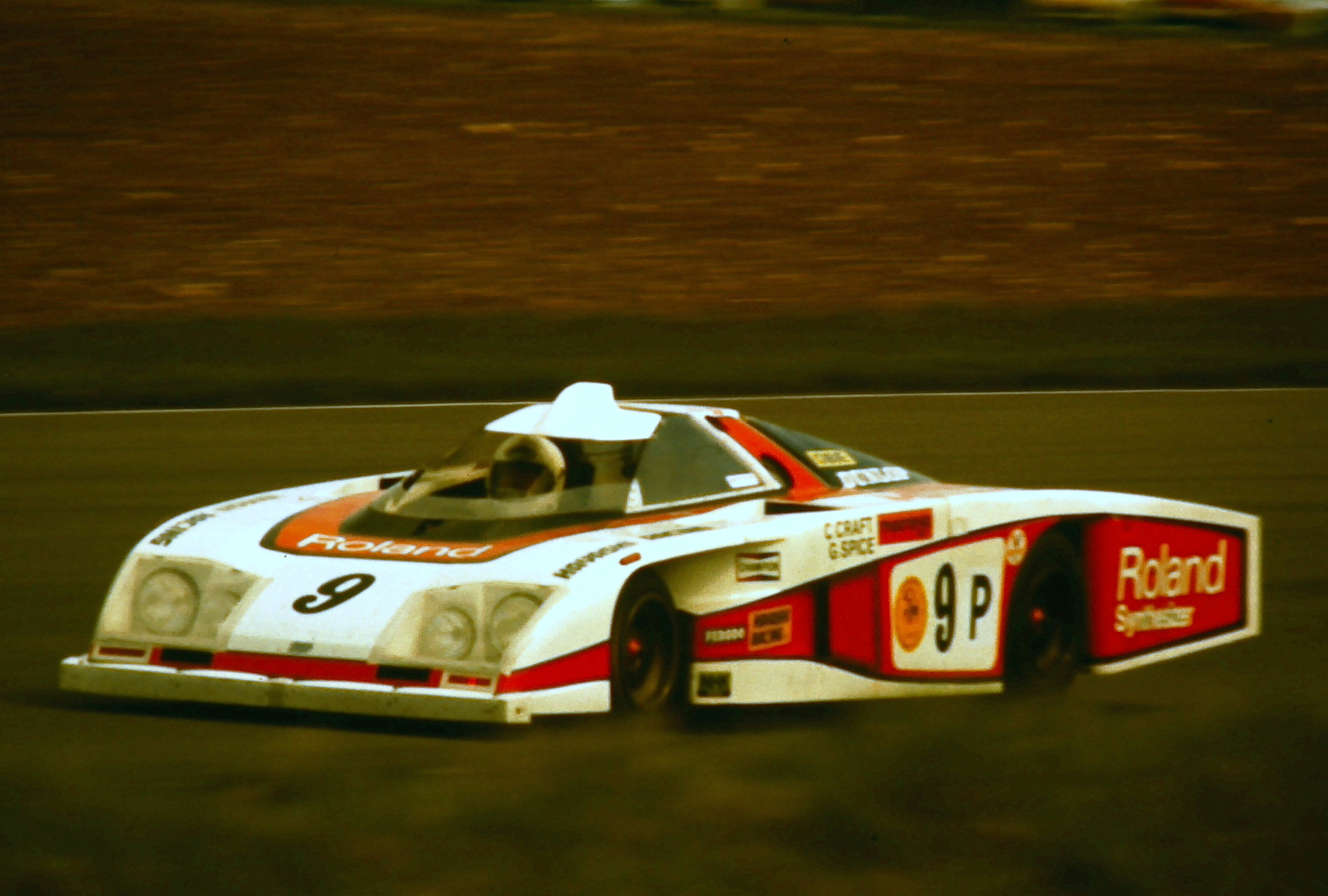
Dome Zero RL at the 1979 Silverstone 6 hours

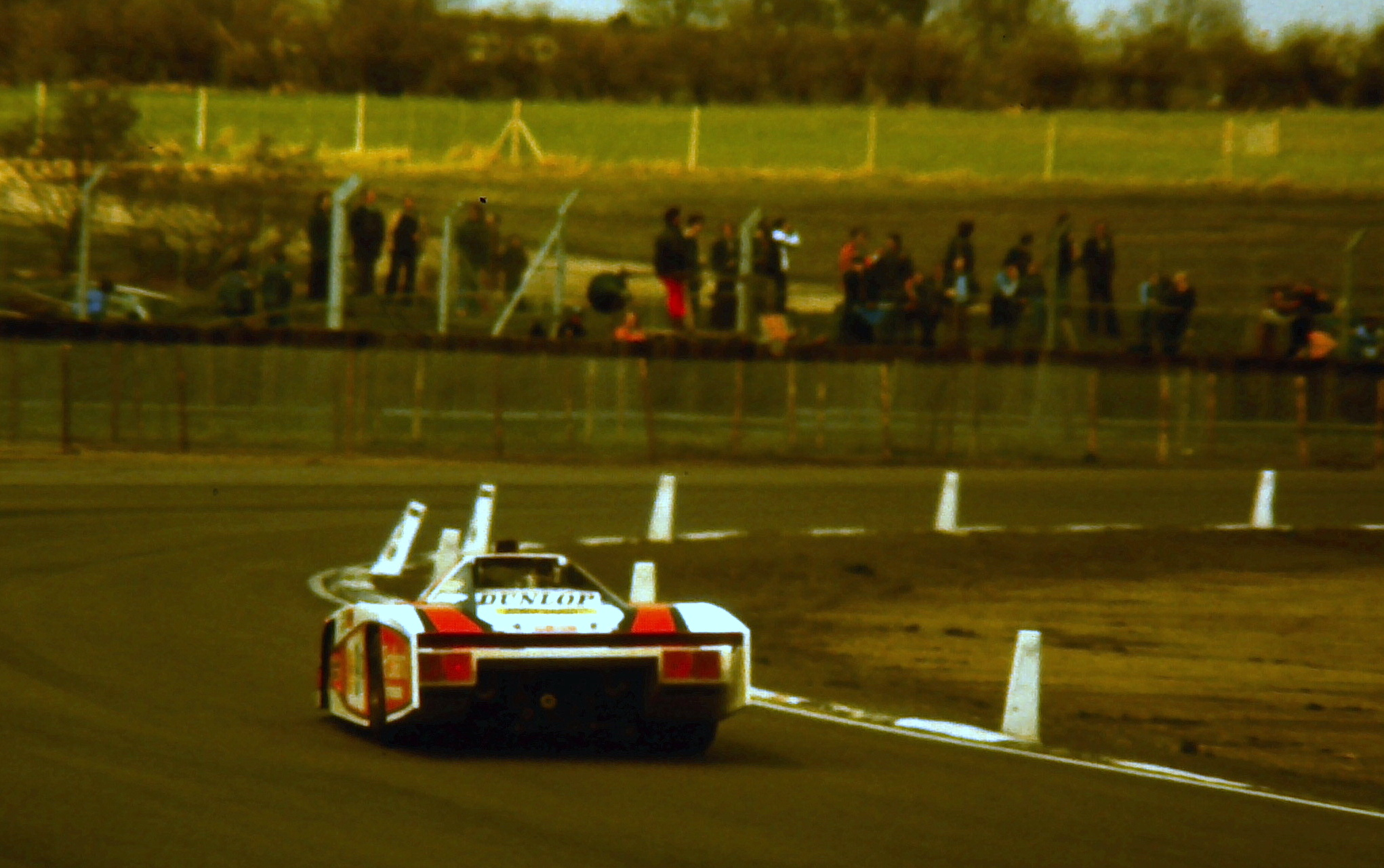
Rear view of the Dome Zero RL

== Specifications ==
- Chassis: MR (mid-engine, rear-wheel-drive)
- Engine: straight-6 Nissan L28
- Capacity: 2,753 cc (168.0 cu in)
- Power: 145 PS (107 kW; 143 hp)
- Torque: 23.0 kg⋅m (226 N⋅m; 166 lb⋅ft)
- Transmission: 5-speed manual
- Weight: 920 kg (2,028 lb)
- Brakes: Ventilated disks front/solid disks rear
- Suspension: Double wishbone front/coils rear
- Tyre: 185/60/VR13 Front, 255/55/VR14 Rear
