= 1994 Japanese Formula 3000 Championship =

The 1994 Japanese Formula 3000 Championship was contested over 10 rounds. 16 different teams, 30 different drivers, 3 different chassis and 3 different engines competed.

== Calendar ==
Race No	Track	Race name	Country	Date	Laps	Distance	Time	Speed	Winner	Pole position	Fastest race lap
1	Suzuka	Million Card Cup Race Round 1 Suzuka	Japan	20 March 1994	35	5.864=205.241 km	1'02:11.322	198.018 km/h	Ross Cheever	Andrew Gilbert Scott	Masahiko Kageyama
2	Fuji	Cosmo Oil International Formula Cup F3000	Japan	10 April 1994	45	4.470=201.15 km	0'58:27.680	206.444 km/h	Andrew Gilbert Scott	Andrew Gilbert Scott	Andrew Gilbert Scott
3	Mine	F3000 Mine All Star	Japan	8 May 1994	62	3.239=200.818 km	1'19:05.233	152.351 km/h	Marco Apicella	Mauro Martini	Marco Apicella
4	Suzuka	Million Card Cup Race Round 2 Suzuka	Japan	22 May 1994	34	5.864=199.376 km	1'00:54.809	196.386 km/h	Marco Apicella	Naoki Hattori	Marco Apicella
5	Sugo	Sugo Inter Formula	Japan	31 July 1994	54	3.704=200.016 km	1'05:00.092	184.626 km/h	Takuya Kurosawa	Ross Cheever	Andrew Gilbert Scott
6	Fuji	Fuji Inter F3000	Japan	3 September 1994	45	4.470=201.15 km	0'59:29.384	202.875 km/h	Andrew Gilbert Scott	Andrew Gilbert Scott	Marco Apicella
7	Suzuka	Million Card Cup Race Round 3 Suzuka	Japan	2 October 1994	35	5.864=205.241 km	1'02:53.557	195.801 km/h	Ross Cheever	Ross Cheever	Marco Apicella
8	Fuji	F3000 Fuji Champions	Japan	16 October 1994	44	4.470=196.68 km	0'57:34.578	204.959 km/h	Marco Apicella	Marco Apicella	Michael Krumm
9	Fuji	International F3000 Fuji Final	Japan	14 November 1994	45	4.470=201.15 km	0'58:35.902	205.961 km/h	Andrew Gilbert Scott	Marco Apicella	Marco Apicella
10	Suzuka	Million Card Cup Race Final Round Suzuka	Japan	27 November 1994	35	5.864=205.241 km	1'02:14.692	197.839 km/h	Naoki Hattori	Andrew Gilbert Scott	Takuya Kurosawa

== Final point standings ==
=== Driver ===
For every race points were awarded: 9 points to the winner, 6 for runner-up, 4 for third place, 3 for fourth place, 2 for fifth place and 1 for sixth place. No additional points were awarded. The best 7 results count. Two drivers had a point deduction, which are given in ().

Place	Name	Country	Team	Chassis	Engine	(Japan)	(Japan)	(Japan)	(Japan)	(Japan)	(Japan)	(Japan)	(Japan)	(Japan)	(Japan)	Total points
1	Marco Apicella	Italy	Dome	Dome	Mugen Honda	6	3	9	9	(1)	(3)	6	9	6	-	48
2	Andrew Gilbert Scott	United Kingdom	Stellar International	Lola	Mugen Honda	-	9	6	-	6	9	4	2	9	-	45
3	Ross Cheever	United States	Team LeMans	Reynard	Mugen Honda	9	4	2	6	3	-	9	-	-	-	33
4	Takuya Kurosawa	Japan	Team Cerumo	Lola	Mugen Honda	-	-	4	3	9	1	3	6	(1)	6	32
5	Naoki Hattori	Japan	Team LeMans	Reynard	Mugen Honda	3	-	1	4	4	4	-	-	2	9	27
	Mauro Martini	Italy	Team Nova	Lola	Mugen Honda	-	6	3	2	2	6	-	-	4	4	27
7	Mika Salo	Finland	Team 5Zigen	Lola	Cosworth	4	2	-	-	-	-	-	-	-	-	6
	Kazuyoshi Hoshino	Japan	Team Impul	Lola	Mugen Honda	-	-	-	-	-	2	-	-	3	1	6
9	Tom Kristensen	Denmark	Navi Connection Racing	Reynard	Mugen Honda	-	-	-	1	-	-	1	-	-	3	5
10	Kunimitsu Takahashi	Japan	Advan Sport Pal	Lola	Mugen Honda	-	-	-	-	-	-	-	4	-	-	4
11	Michael Krumm	Germany	Dome	Dome	Mugen Honda	-	-	-	-	-	-	-	3	-	-	3
	Katsutomo Kaneishi	Japan	Cabin Racing/Heroes	Lola	Cosworth	2	-	-	-	-	-	-	1	-	-	2
13	Masahiko Kageyama	Japan	Nakajima Racing	Reynard	Mugen Honda	-	-	-	-	-	-	2	-	-	-	2
	Thomas Danielsson	Sweden	Team 5Zigen	Lola	Judd	-	-	-	-	-	-	-	-	-	2	2
15	Jeff Krosnoff	United States	Giza Racing	Lola	Cosworth	1	-	-	-	-	-	-	-	-	-	1
	Toshio Suzuki	Japan	Mirai Corporation	Lola	Cosworth	-	1	-	-	-	-	-	-	-	-	1

== Complete Overview ==
first column of every race	10	= grid position

second column of every race	10	= race result

R=retired DIS=disqualified

Place	Name	Country	Team	Chassis	Engine	(Japan)		(Japan)		(Japan)		(Japan)		(Japan)		(Japan)		(Japan)		(Japan)		(Japan)		(Japan)
1	Marco Apicella	Italy	Dome	Dome	Mugen Honda	4	2	3	4	2	1	3	1	13	6	8	4	3	2	1	1	1	2	3	R
2	Andrew Gilbert Scott	United Kingdom	Stellar International	Lola	Mugen Honda	1	13	1	1	6	2	5	R	5	2	1	1	4	3	2	5	5	1	1	R
3	Ross Cheever	United States	Team LeMans	Reynard	Mugen Honda	3	1	2	3	3	5	2	2	1	4	5	7	1	1	8	R	4	R	6	7
4	Takuya Kurosawa	Japan	Team Cerumo	Lola	Mugen Honda	8	10	8	10	5	3	4	4	2	1	3	6	5	4	3	2	7	6	2	2
5	Naoki Hattori	Japan	Team LeMans	Reynard	Mugen Honda	2	4	13	12	9	6	1	3	4	3	2	3	2	R	6	R	6	5	4	1
	Mauro Martini	Italy	Team Nova	Lola	Mugen Honda	11	11	5	2	1	4	6	5	7	5	4	2	10	R	12	10	3	3	5	3
7	Mika Salo	Finland	Team 5Zigen	Lola	Cosworth	5	3	6	5	8	7	10	11
7	Mika Salo	Finland	Team 5Zigen	Lola	Judd									10	12	9	R	19	8	9	R	-	-	18	10
	Kazuyoshi Hoshino	Japan	Team Impul	Lola	Mugen Honda	6	R	12	7	7	R	13	R	3	R	6	5	6	15	16	R	10	4	10	6
9	Tom Kristensen	Denmark	Navi Connection Racing	Reynard	Mugen Honda	13	8	16	9	15	9	9	6	11	11	13	9	8	6	7	R	11	12	8	4
10	Kunimitsu Takahashi	Japan	Advan Sport Pal	Lola	Mugen Honda	16	12	15	R	-	-	15	8	-	-	14	8	16	11	10	3	14	10	19	14
11	Michael Krumm	Germany	Dome	Dome	Mugen Honda	-	-	-	-	-	-	-	-	-	-	-	-	-	-	15	4	12	7	12	15
	Katsutomo Kaneishi	Japan	Cabin Racing/Heroes	Lola	Cosworth	10	5	14	8	4	12	7	R					7	13	11	6	9	8	11	R
	Katsutomo Kaneishi	Japan	Cabin Racing/Heroes	Lola	Judd									9	7	11	R
13	Masahiko Kageyama	Japan	Nakajima Racing	Reynard	Mugen Honda	7	16	7	R	12	11	14	R	8	9	7	R	9	5	5	R	8	11	9	8
	Thomas Danielsson	Sweden	Team 5Zigen	Lola	Judd	-	-	17	13	11	R	11	7			15	10	15	DIS	4	R	2	9	7	5
	Thomas Danielsson	Sweden	Team 5Zigen	Lola	Cosworth									15	R
15	Jeff Krosnoff	United States	Giza Racing	Lola	Cosworth	14	6	9	11	10	R	-	-	-	-	-	-
15	Jeff Krosnoff	United States	Speed Star Wheel Racing	Lola	Mugen Honda													18	12	14	7	15	16	17	R
	Toshio Suzuki	Japan	Mirai Corporation	Lola	Cosworth	9	7	4	6	-	-	-	-	-	-	-	-	-	-	-	-	-	-	-	-
-	Toranosuke Takagi	Japan	Nakajima Racing	Reynard	Mugen Honda	-	-	-	-	-	-	-	-	-	-	-	-	14	7	13	8	-	-	15	9
-	Yasutaka Hinoi	Japan	Nakajima Racing	Reynard	Mugen Honda	12	9	10	R	13	8	12	R	6	R	10	11	13	R	17	9	16	13	21	R
-	Hidetoshi Mitsusada	Japan	Dome	Dome	Mugen Honda	15	R	11	R	14	10	8	9	14	8	12	12	11	10	-	-	-	-	-	-
-	Naohiro Furuya	Japan	Team Cerumo	Lola	Mugen Honda	-	-	-	-	-	-	-	-	-	-	-	-	17	9	-	-	-	-	-	-
-	Akihiko Nakaya	Japan	Speed Star Wheel Racing	Lola	Mugen Honda	17	15	18	15	16	R	16	10	12	10	16	R	-	-	-	-	-	-	-	-
-	Masatomo Shimizu	Japan	Shimizu Racing	Reynard	Mugen Honda	-	-	19	14	-	-	-	-	-	-	17	R	-	-	18	11	21	R	-	-
-	Masami Kageyama	Japan	Team LeMans	Reynard	Mugen Honda	-	-	-	-	-	-	-	-	-	-	-	-	12	14	-	-	-	-	14	11
-	Hisashi Wada	Japan	Stellar International	Lola	Mugen Honda	-	-	-	-	-	-	-	-	-	-	-	-	-	-	-	-	13	R	16	12
-	Minoru Tanaka	Japan	Team 5Zigen	Lola	Judd	18	14	-	-	-	-	-	-	-	-	-	-	-	-	-	-	-	-
-	Minoru Tanaka	Japan	Team 5Zigen	Lola	Cosworth																			13	13
-	Richard Dean	United Kingdom	Team 5Zigen	Lola	Cosworth	-	-	-	-	-	-	-	-	-	-	-	-	-	-	-	-	17	14	-	-
-	Eiichi Tajima	Japan	Team Cerumo	Lola	Mugen Honda	-	-	-	-	-	-	-	-	-	-	-	-	-	-	-	-	18	15	22	R
-	Eiji Yamada	Japan	Team Cerumo	Lola	Mugen Honda	-	-	-	-	-	-	-	-	-	-	-	-	-	-	-	-	20	17	-	-
-	Shinji Nakano	Japan	Team Nova	Lola	Mugen Honda	-	-	-	-	-	-	-	-	-	-	-	-	20	R	-	-	-	-
-	Shinji Nakano	Japan	Nakajima Racing	Reynard	Mugen Honda																			20	R
-	Akira Iida	Japan	Team Nova	Lola	Mugen Honda	-	-	-	-	-	-	-	-	-	-	-	-	-	-	-	-	19	R	23	R
