= Katsumi Yamamoto (racing driver) =

Japanese racing driver

Katsumi Yamamoto (山本勝巳, Yamamoto Katsumi; born March 5, 1973) is a Japanese professional racing driver. A native of Fukuoka, he has notably raced in Formula 3, Formula 3000 and Formula Nippon, as well as Super GT.

== Career ==
Yamamoto began his single-seater career in 1993 by participating in the Japanese Formula 3 Championship. He participated in nine races without scoring a single point.

The following year, Yamamoto left for Germany to race in the national Formula 3 Championship with the WTS-TKF Racing team. He ranked twenty-sixth with two points. He also competed in the Formula 3 Masters at Circuit Zandvoort, finishing twenty-third on behalf of WTS Motorsport.

In 1995, Yamamoto returned to Japan to participate in the Formula 3000 Championship with X Japan Racing Team Le Mans. He came ninth with 9 points, having been on the podium once at Sportsland Sugo. Thanks to these results Yamamoto obtained a test for Pacific Grand Prix in Formula 1. He was set to participate in the Japanese and Pacific Grands Prix for the sum of 1.2 million dollars, but was not granted a Super Licence and his plan to race in Formula 1 fell through.

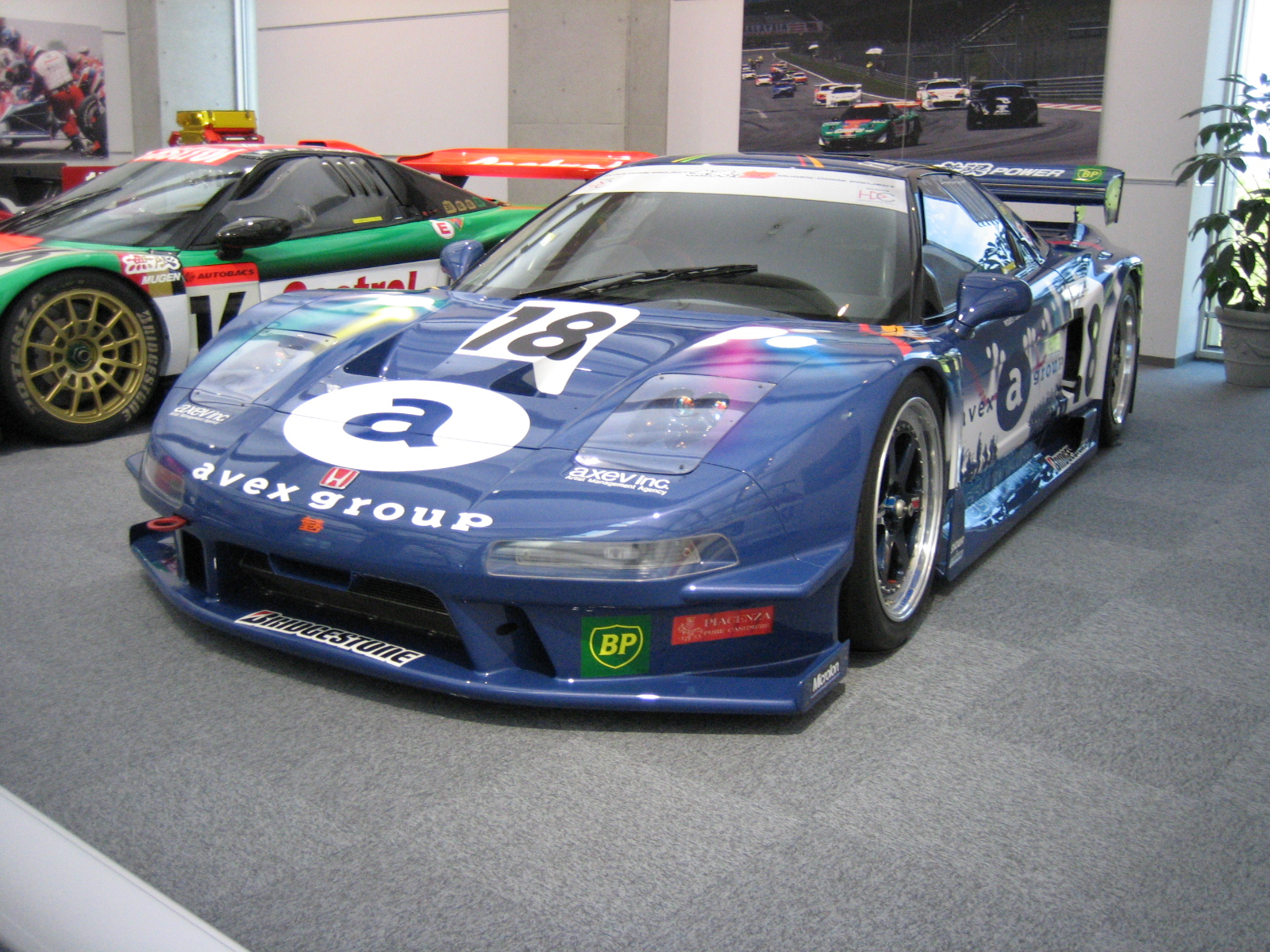
A Honda NSX of Mugen & Dome Project, like the one Yamamoto raced in 1997 and 1998.

Yamamoto then took refuge in the Formula Nippon championship and the Anabuki Dome Mugen team. He scored a point in 1996 and finished seventeenth in the standings.

In 1997, Yamamoto entered the All-Japan GT Championship in the GT500 class with Mugen & Dome Project's Honda NSX. He scored 11 points, achieved a pole position and finished sixteenth in the championship. At the same time, he returned to Formula Nippon, this time with the Navi Connection Racing Team. His only achievement would be a fastest lap at Mine Circuit, as he failed to score points in any of the ten races.

In 1998, Yamamoto participated in a JGTC race in the GT300 category with the Toyota Celica of Racing Project Bandoh and stepped on the podium on this occasion. This came at the final round of the season at Sportsland Sugo, after he had once again contested the first five in GT500 with Dome Racing and their Honda NSX. He ranked fifteenth in GT500 and nineteenth in GT300.

== Racing record ==
=== Japanese Top Formula Championship results ===
Year	Team	1	2	3	4	5	6	7	8	9	10	DC	Pts
1995	X Japan Racing Team Le Mans	SUZ; Ret	FSW; C	MIN; 4	SUZ; Ret	SUG; 2	FSW; Ret	TOK; Ret	FSW; 8	SUZ; Ret		9th	9
1996	Anabuki Dome Mugen	SUZ; 9	MIN; Ret	FSW; 10	TOK; Ret	SUZ; Ret	SUG; 6	FSW; Ret	MIN; 14	SUZ; Ret	FSW; Ret	17th	1
1997	Navi Connection Racing Team	SUZ; 10	MIN; Ret	FSW; Ret	SUZ; 9	SUG; Ret	FSW; 12	MIN; Ret	MOT; 14	FSW; 7	SUZ; Ret	NC	0

=== Complete JGTC results ===
Year	Team	Car	Class	1	2	3	4	5	6	7	DC	Pts
1997	Mugen & Dome Project	Honda NSX	GT500	SUZ	FSW; Ret	SEN; Ret	FSW; Ret	MIN; 8	SUG; 5		16th	11
1998	Mugen & Dome Project	Honda NSX	GT500	SUZ; Ret	FSW; C	SEN; Ret	FSW; 4	MOT; Ret			15th	10
1998	Racing Project Bandoh	Toyota Celica	GT300						MIN	SUG; 3	19th	12
