= Dome (constructor) =

Japanese racing car manufacturer

Dome Co. Ltd
- Industry: Motorsport
- Founded: 1975
- Founder: Minoru Hayashi
- Headquarters: Maibara, Shiga, Japan
- Key people: Hiroshi Fushida (President); Shigeo Takebayashi (Managing Director)
- Website: www.dome.co.jp

Dome Co. Ltd (株式会社童夢, Kabushiki Gaisha Dōmu), literally "child's dream", is a Japanese racing car constructor involved mainly in open-wheel and sports car racing.

== History ==
=== Early years ===
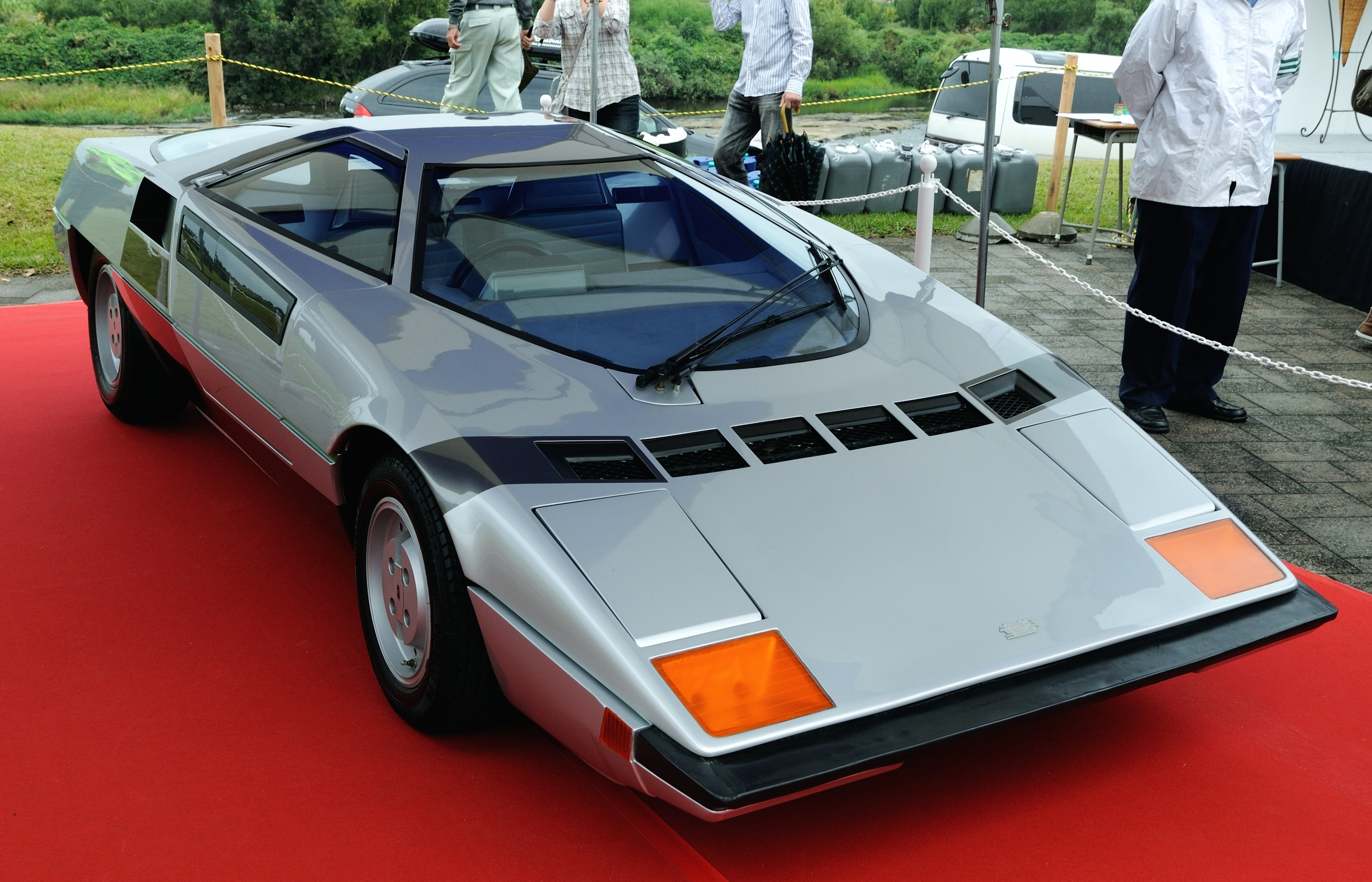
The Dome Zero prototype

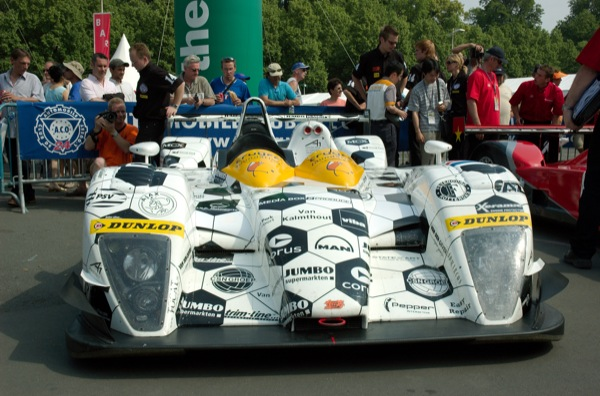
A Dome S101hb run by Racing for Holland at the 2006 24 Hours of Le Mans.

In 1965, Minoru Hayashi built his first racing car, a rebodied Honda S600 coupe. Belonging to Tojiro Ukiya, it was called the "Karasu" (crow in Japanese), due to its shape. Built on a small budget and in a short time, the Karasu emphasized weight reduction and aerodynamics using FRP materials. The car went on to win its debut race at the Suzuka Clubman Race, despite Hayashi having no experience in racecar construction. In 1966 he went on to build the "Macransa", a more extensively modified Honda S800, to compete at the Japanese Grand Prix. This was followed by the "Kusabi" three years later, which was a Formula Junior racing car, and the "Panic" in 1971.

In 1975 at Takaragaike, Kyoto, Hayashi formed Dome with the intention to manufacture cars with small production runs, using racing machines to develop the technology. Three years after the company's formation in 1978, the company produced its first concept car designed for road use, the Nissan L28-powered Dome Zero (童夢-零, Dōmu Zero), designed to be world’s lowest-riding sports car, with its height set at 980 mm (38.6 in). The Zero made its public debut at the Geneva Motor Show the same year. For the following year, Dome produced a production version of the Zero called the Zero P2, which was exhibited at the Chicago Auto Show and Los Angeles Auto Expo. The car was refused type approval by the Japanese government, however, and was unable to go into production.

=== Sportscar manufacturer ===
Dome entered the 1980s as a sportscar constructor designing and building the Group C spec Toyota TOM'S cars to compete in the All Japan Super Silhouette Championship, and later the All Japan Sports Prototype Championship, and World Sportscar Championship until the end of the 1980s. Dome's vehicles included the Celica C and prototypes from the 83C through to the 88C.

=== Formula Three ===
Minoru Hayashi would also assist his cousin Masakazu Hayashi (of the Hayashi aluminum wheel company) establish his own formula car manufacturing concern. After producing cars for Japan's Formula Junior 1600 category for 10 years, their first Formula 3 car was the Hayashi 803 Formula Three car, designed by the two cousins. It was followed by the Hayashi 320 in 1981 designed by Masao Ono, who had also designed the 1976 Kojima F1 car. Osamu Nakako won the All-Japan Formula Three Championship title driving a Hayashi 320. A 320 was also modified for the Formula Atlantic category and won the Macau Grand Prix driven by American Bob Earl. A further development, the 321, saw action briefly in Japan and England. Ono then switched to Dome to work on the sportscar designs, and Hayashi Racing switched to Ralt chassis to win the Japanese F3 title with Kengo Nakamoto.

In 1984, the follow-up Hayashi 322 was a success and helped Shuji Hyodo to win that year's Japanese F3 championship. In 1985, the Hayashi 330 won a single Japanese F3 race, but finishes were good enough to place driver Shuji Hyodo third in season-end standing. A development of the 322, the 331, appeared in a handful of Japanese F3 races in 1986 without success and disappeared quietly. A downturn in the aluminum wheel business is credited in causing Hayashi to abandon racing.

=== Post-Formula Three ===
In 1988, Dome would return to production car design, establishing a design studio called Jiotto Design to design cars with its own quarter-scale wind tunnel. The studio produced the Jiotto Caspita supercar, which never went into production due to the recession.

Dome continued to compete with Jan Lammers, Keiji Matsumoto, Ross Cheever and Thomas Danielsson, driving until 1992, when Marco Apicella was signed to drive the new Dome-Mugen F103, taking the title in 1994. The Formula 3000 program continued until 1998 with Shinji Nakano, Katsumi Yamamoto and Juichi Wakisaka but without much success.

=== Formula One ===
Late in 1995, Tadashi Sasaki, joined Dome and that autumn the company announced its plan to enter F1 with a car designed by Akiyoshi Uko called the Dome F105, using a Minardi transmission and hydraulic system. Marco Apicella was installed as test driver in 1996 and the test driving duties were later taken over by Shinji Nakano and Naoki Hattori. The planned 1997 World Championship effort came to nothing and the follow-up car, the Dome F106, never materialised due to lack of sponsorship and Mugen's refusal to supply engines. The Concorde Agreement also delayed the start for the team. By 1999, all development work would fold after Honda's involvement with British American Racing.

=== Recent projects ===
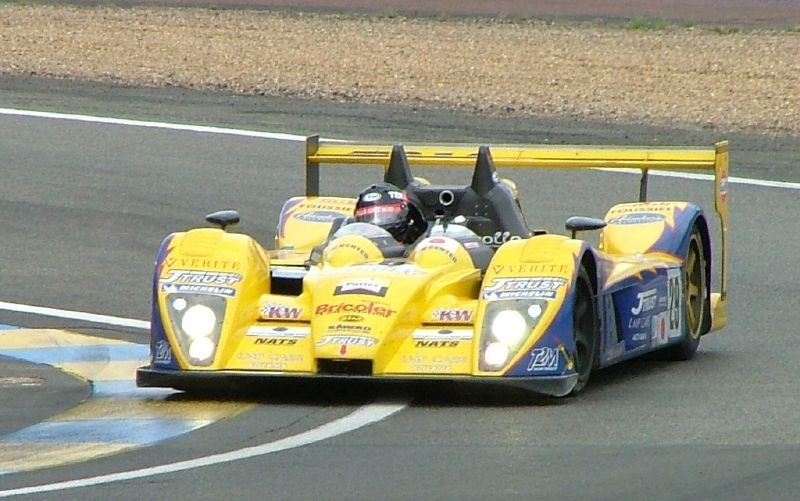
A Dome S101.5 run by T2M Motorsport in 2007.

In 1999 Dome established Dome Cars Ltd. in the United Kingdom and the Dome Tunnel in Maihara, Shiga Prefecture, which was originally intended for F1 construction. The company also focused its effort in the Japanese GT Championship, competing as a team as well as building the Honda NSX for other factory supported teams. They also worked on the aerodynamics on the JTCC Honda Accord, and were the only make of the Formula Dream series, held from 1999 to 2005.

In 2001, DOME Carbon Magic was formed in Mishima, Shizuoka Prefecture, specifically for carbon composite development and manufacture. It continued to build and race the Honda NSX in the recently renamed Super GT series, with Takata as the main sponsor.

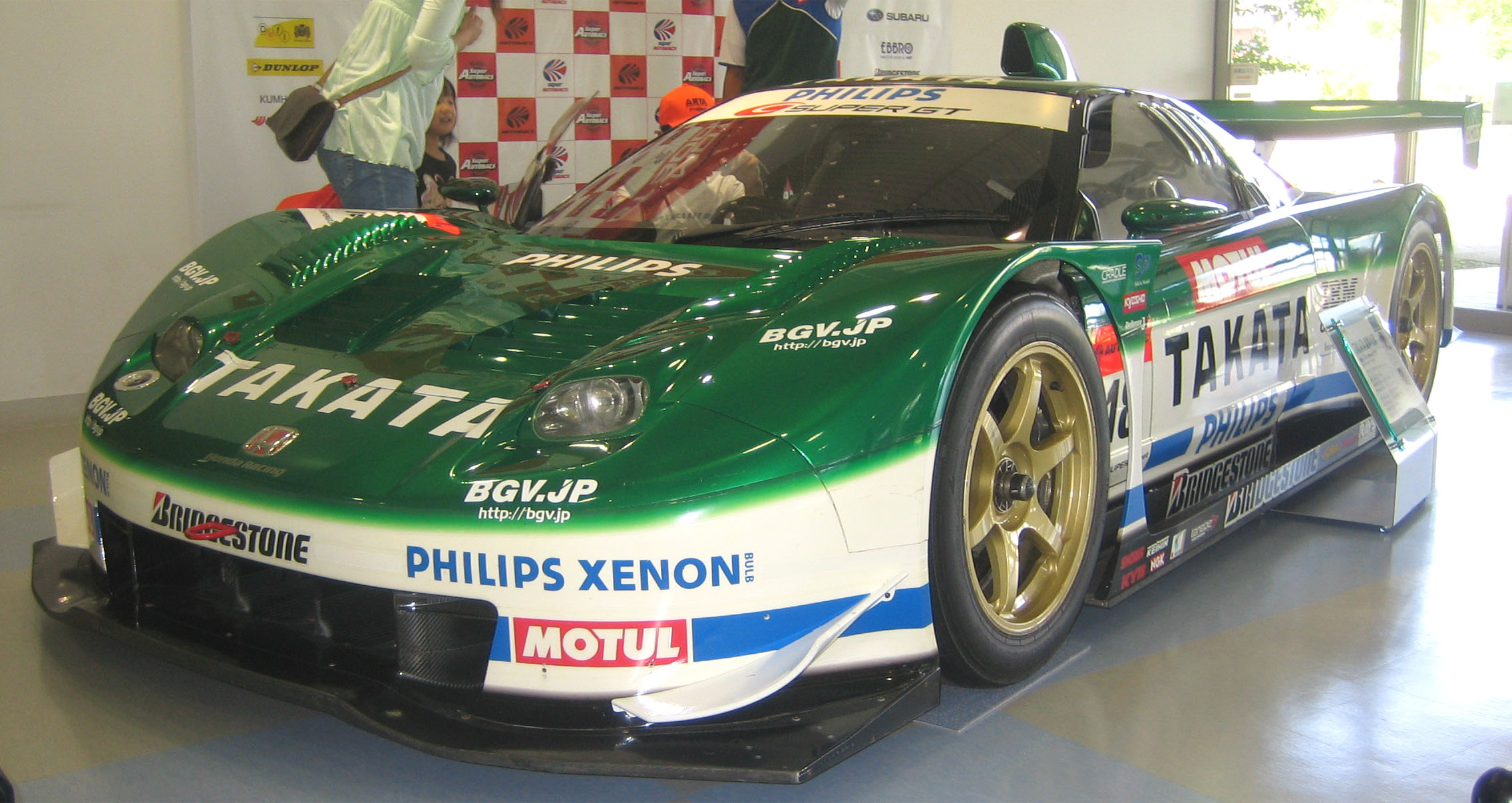
A Honda NSX-GT with the 2007 Takata Dome livery. Dome won three teams' titles (2000, 2002 and 2010) and one drivers' title (2010) in Super GT/JGTC as a team.

Dome also upgraded their Dome S101 Le Mans prototype chassis to meet new regulations for 2007. The new car has been dubbed the S101.5. These S101s were supplied to Racing for Holland. In 2008, Dome introduced a closed-cockpit prototype called the S102 for the Le Mans Prototype 1 (LMP1) class and entered in the 2008 24 Hours of Le Mans after an absence of 22 years.

In February 2012, Dome announced that it will enter an updated S102 in the 2012 24 Hours of Le Mans. The updated car, designated the S102.5, will be powered by a 3.4L Judd V8. In a departure for Dome, the team will self-fund race operations, rather than lease their car to a separately funded race team. Dome allied with Pescarolo for race operations until the latter dissolved, and have instructed its team to focus development on outright speed over one lap, rather than on reliability or endurance pace for a 24-hour race.

In 2014, Dome left Super GT as a team entrant to focus on the construction of the Mother Chassis platform for the GT300 class; the team was reported to return in 2017, but did not materialize in favor of entering a Honda Civic TCR in the Super Taikyu Series.

== Models ==
=== Racecars ===
Year	Car	Image	Category
1982	Dome RC82		Group C
1983	Dome RC83		Group C
1984	Dome 84C		Group C
1985	Dome 85C		Group C
1986	Dome 86C		Group C
1996	Dome F105		Formula One (unraced)
2001	Dome S101		LMP900; LMP1
2008	Dome S102		LMP1
2015	Dome F110		Formula 4
2015	Strakka-Dome S103		LMP2
2020	Dome F111/3		Formula Regional

=== Prototype road cars ===
Year Produced	Car	Image	Class
1978	Dome Zero		Concept car Sports car
1979	Dome Zero P2		Concept car Sports car
1989	Jiotto Caspita (Mk. I)		Concept car Sports car
1990	Jiotto Caspita (Mk. II)		Concept car Sports car

== Race results ==
=== Japanese Grand Touring Championship (JGTC) ===
(key) (Races in bold indicate pole position) (Races in italics indicate fastest lap)

Year	Car	Tyres	Class	No.	Drivers	1	2	3	4	5	6	7	8	9	Pos	Pts
1997	Honda NSX	B	GT500	18	(Japan) Takuya Kurosawa (Japan) Katsumi Yamamoto	SUZ	FUJ; Ret	SEN; Ret	FUJ; Ret	**MIN**; 8	SUG; 5	NC1; 8	NC2; 9		9th	11
1998	Honda NSX	B	GT500	16	(Japan) Ryō Michigami (Japan) Osamu Nakako	SUZ; Ret	FUJ; C	**SEN**; Ret	FUJ; 5	**MOT**; 1	MIN; 11	**SUG**; 1	NC1; 7		5th	48
1998	Honda NSX	B	GT500	18	(Japan) Katsutomo Kaneishi (Japan) Katsumi Yamamoto (Japan) Juichi Wakisaka	SUZ; Ret	FUJ; C	SEN; Ret	FUJ; 4	MOT; Ret	MIN; 15	SUG; DSQ	NC1; Ret		12th	10
1999	Honda NSX	B	GT500	16	(Japan) Ryō Michigami (Japan) Osamu Nakako	SUZ; 14	FUJ; 12	SUG; 3	MIN; 3	FUJ; 9	OKA; 16	MOT; 4	NC1; 5		3rd	81
1999	Honda NSX	B	GT500	18	(Japan) Katsutomo Kaneishi (Japan) Juichi Wakisaka	**SUZ**; 1	FUJ; Ret	SUG; Ret	MIN; 11	FUJ; 2	OKA; 3	MOT; Ret	NC1; Ret		3rd	81
2000	Honda NSX	B	GT500	16	(Japan) Ryō Michigami (Japan) Osamu Nakako (Japan) Hidetoshi Mitsusada	MOT; 2	FUJ; 8	SUG; 2	NC1; 10	FUJ; 10	OKA; 2	MIN; 4	SUZ; 2		1st	96
2000	Honda NSX	B	GT500	18	(Japan) Katsutomo Kaneishi (Japan) Juichi Wakisaka	**MOT**; Ret	**FUJ**; 1	**SUG**; 4	**NC1**; 2	FUJ; 17	OKA; 10	**MIN**; 2	SUZ; 15		1st	96
2001	Honda NSX	B	GT500	1	(Japan) Ryō Michigami (Japan) Hidetoshi Mitsusada	**OKA**; 1	FUJ; 8	SUG; 4	NC1; 5	FUJ; 5	MOT; 12	SUZ; 2	MIN; 12		2nd	68
2001	Honda NSX	B	GT500	18	(France) Sébastien Philippe (Japan) Hiroki Katoh (France) Benoît Tréluyer	OKA; 14	FUJ; 15	SUG; 6	NC1; 2	FUJ; 15	MOT; 14	SUZ; 12	MIN; 3		2nd	68
2002	Honda NSX	B	GT500	16	(Japan) Daisuke Ito (Germany) Dominik Schwager (Japan) Ryō Michigami	OKA; 5	FUJ; 3	SUG; 3	SEP; 10	FUJ; 11	MOT; 16	MIN; 1	SUZ; 10		1st	96
2002	Honda NSX	B	GT500	18	(United Kingdom) Richard Lyons (France) Sébastien Philippe	OKA; 2	FUJ; 15	SUG; 16	SEP; 13	FUJ; 6	MOT; 1	MIN; 12	SUZ; 14		1st	96
2003	Honda NSX	B	GT500	16	(Japan) Daisuke Ito (Netherlands) Tom Coronel	OKA; 4	FUJ; Ret	SUG; 9	FUJ; 12	FUJ; 8	MOT; 1	AUT; 10	SUZ; 11		3rd	77
2003	Honda NSX	B	GT500	18	(Japan) Ryō Michigami (France) Sébastien Philippe (Italy) Paolo Montin	OKA; 3	FUJ; Ret	SUG; 7	FUJ; 8	FUJ; 1	MOT; 14	AUT; Ret	SUZ; 2		3rd	77
2004	Honda NSX	B	GT500	18	(Japan) Ryō Michigami (France) Sébastien Philippe	OKA; 12	SUG; 12	SEP; 8	TOK; 8	MOT; 15	AUT; 14	SUZ; 12	NC1; Ret	NC2; 3	12th	6

=== Complete Super GT results ===
(key) (Races in bold indicate pole position) (Races in italics indicate fastest lap)

Year	Car	Tyres	Class	No.	Drivers	1	2	3	4	5	6	7	8	9	10	Pos	Points
2005	Honda NSX	B	GT500	18	(Japan) Takashi Kogure (Japan) Ryō Michigami	OKA; 7	FUJ; 13	SEP; 7	SUG; Ret	MOT; 2	FUJ; 11	AUT; 5	SUZ; 6			2nd*	82*
2006	Honda NSX	B	GT500	18	(Japan) Takashi Kogure (Japan) Ryō Michigami (Japan) Katsutomo Kaneishi	SUZ; 4	**OKA**; 1	FUJ; Ret	SEP; 6	SUG; Ret	SUZ; Ret	MOT; 5	**AUT**; 2	FUJ; 7		8th	58
2007	Honda NSX	B	GT500	18	(Japan) Takashi Kogure (Japan) Ryō Michigami	SUZ; 13	**OKA**; 7	**FUJ**; 11	**SEP**; Ret	**SUG**; 2	SUZ; 12	**MOT**; 1	AUT; 5	FUJ; 10		6th	63
2008	Honda NSX	B	GT500	18	(Japan) Takashi Kogure (Japan) Ryō Michigami	SUZ; 7	OKA; 12	**FUJ**; 3	SEP; 3	**SUG**; 1	SUZ; 12	MOT; 8	AUT; 7	FUJ; 14		5th	75
2009	Honda NSX	B	GT500	18	(Japan) Takashi Kogure (Japan) Ryō Michigami	OKA; 2	SUZ; 5	FUJ; 13	SEP; 12	SUG; 3	SUZ; 4	FUJ; 8	AUT; 5	MOT; 10		4th	75
2010	Honda HSV-010 GT	B	GT500	18	(Japan) Takashi Kogure (France) Loïc Duval	**SUZ**; Ret	**OKA**; 1	FUJ; 7	SEP; 3	SUG; 2	SUZ; 9	FUJ; C	**MOT**; 2	NC1; 7	NC2; 3	1st	84
2011	Honda HSV-010 GT	B	GT500	1	(Japan) Takashi Kogure (France) Loïc Duval	OKA; 7	FUJ; 13	**SEP**; 1	SUG; Ret	SUZ; 1	FUJ; 4	AUT; 11	MOT; 6	NC1; Ret	NC2; 5	3rd	75
2012	Honda HSV-010 GT	B	GT500	18	(Japan) Takashi Kogure (Netherlands) Carlo van Dam	OKA; 7	FUJ; 9	**SEP**; 1	SUG; 7	SUZ; 8	FUJ; Ret	AUT; 9	MOT; 7	NC1; 7	NC2; 7	7th	58
2013	Honda HSV-010 GT	M	GT500	18	(Japan) Naoki Yamamoto (France) Frédéric Makowiecki	OKA; 5	FUJ; 10	SEP; 4	SUG; 13	SUZ; 1	FUJ; 5	AUT; 5	MOT; 7	**NC1**; 4	NC2; 8	4th	77
2014	Honda NSX-GT	M	GT500	18	(Japan) Naoki Yamamoto (France) Jean-Karl Vernay (France) Frédéric Makowiecki (Japan) Takuya Izawa	OKA; 5	FUJ; 10	AUT; 7	SUG; 8	FUJ; 1	SUZ; 3	BUR; 5	MOT; 3			4th	83

^{‡} Half points awarded as less than 75% of race distance was completed. * Season still in progress.

Note: in 2005 ARTA and Dome entered the Team's Championship together under the Team Honda Racing banner.
