= 2017 Super GT Series =

Season of Japanese auto racing competition

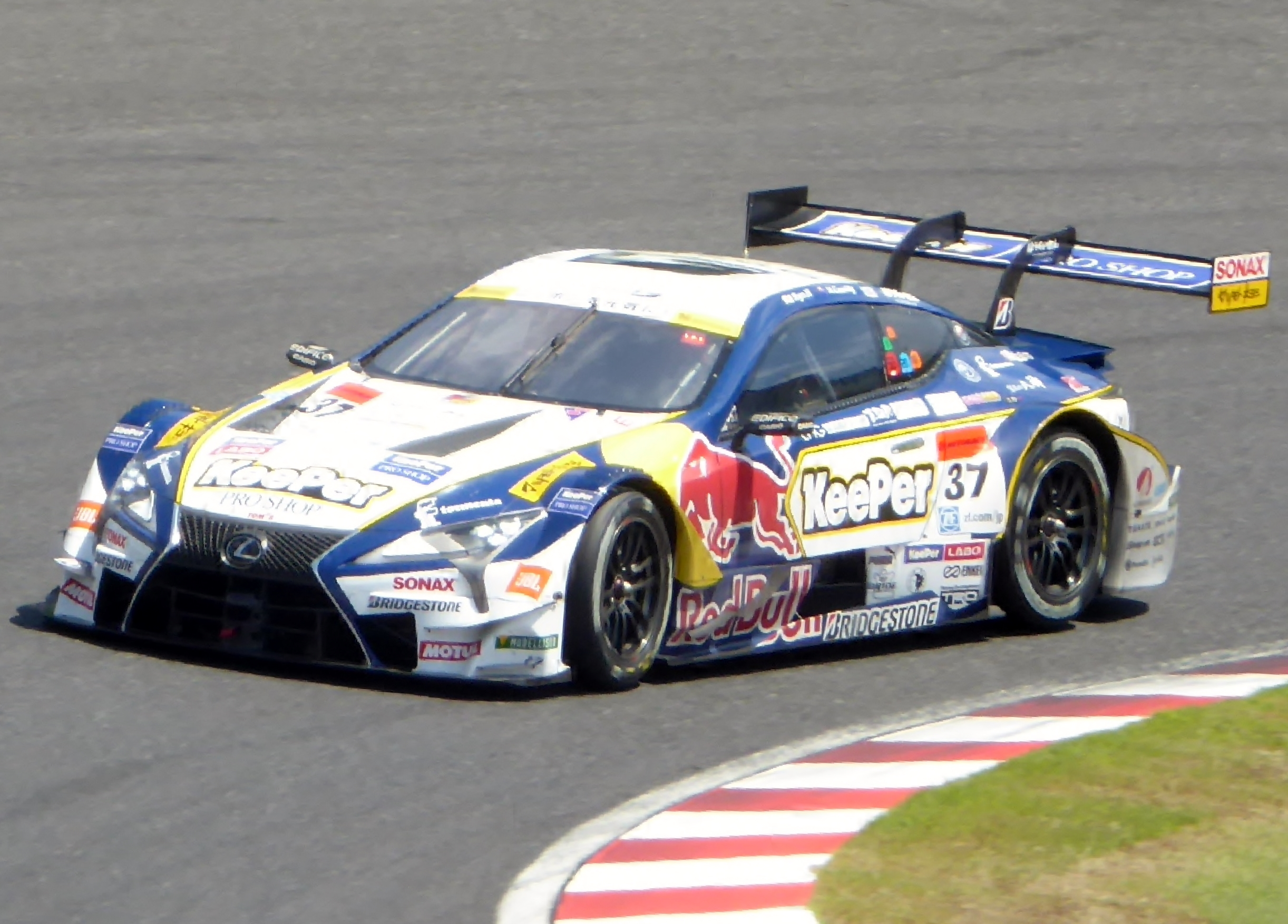
2017 GT500 champions, #37 Lexus Team KeePer TOM'S Lexus LC 500.

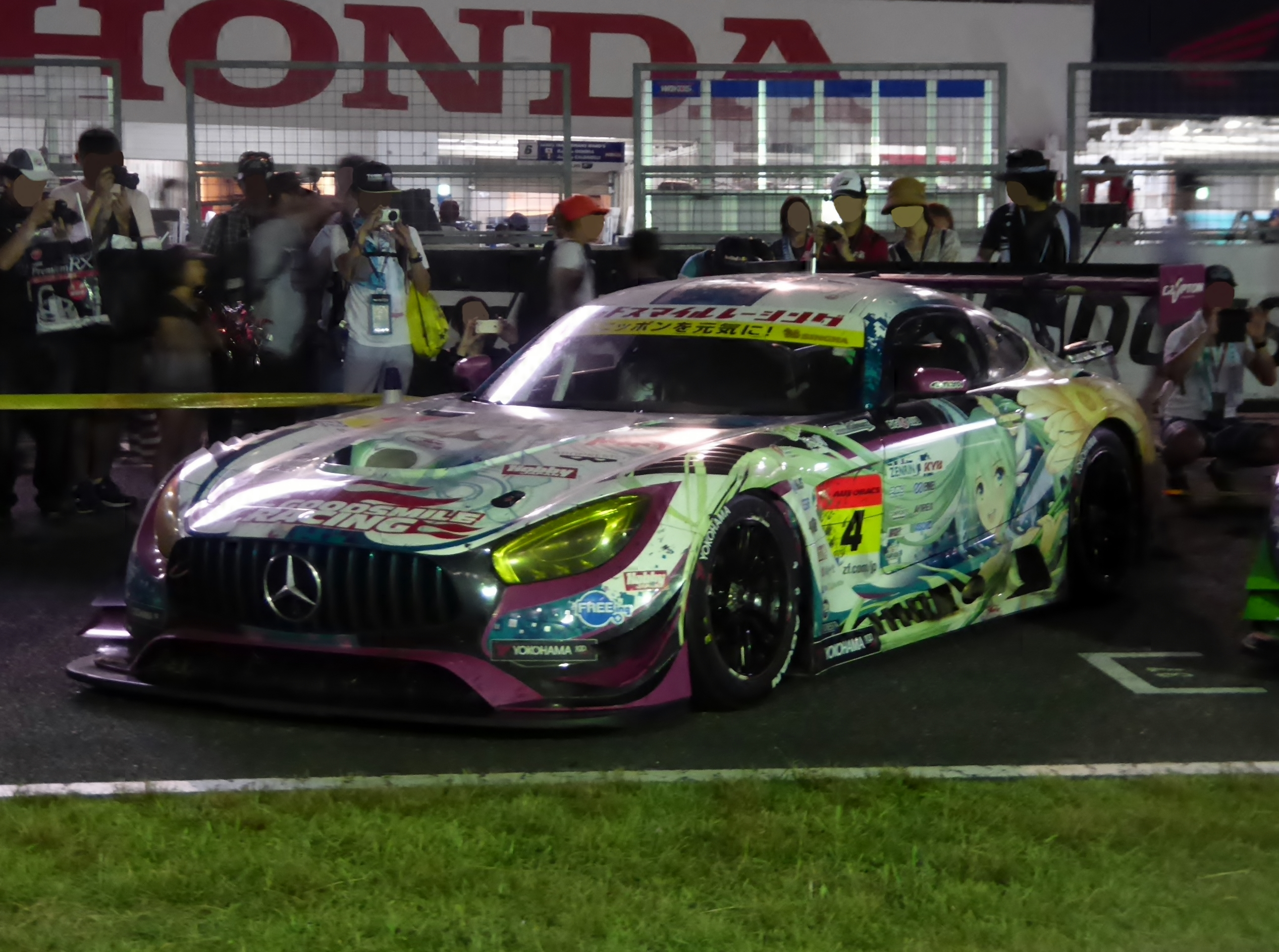
2017 GT300 champions, #4 Goodsmile Hatsune Miku AMG.

The 2017 Autobacs Super GT Series was the twenty-fifth season of the Japan Automobile Federation Super GT Championship including the All Japan Grand Touring Car Championship (JGTC) era, and the thirteenth season under the name Super GT. It was the thirty-fifth overall season of a national JAF sportscar championship dating back to the All Japan Sports Prototype Championship. The season began on April 9 and ended on November 12, after 8 races.

In the GT500 class, the No. 37 Lexus Team KeePer TOM'S duo of Ryō Hirakawa and Nick Cassidy won their first-ever championship, narrowly beating the Nismo duo of Tsugio Matsuda and Ronnie Quintarelli for the championship. It was the first championship title for TOM'S since Juichi Wakisaka and André Lotterer's 2009 title win. In the GT300 class, in Good Smile Company and Hatsune Miku's 10th season of involvement in Super GT, Goodsmile Racing won their third GT300 title in just seven years after a closely fought championship battle between the No. 4 Hatsune Miku AMG and the No. 65 LEON CVSTOS AMG of K2 R&D LEON Racing. It was Nobuteru Taniguchi and Tatsuya Kataoka's third title, as well as Mercedes' first championship title in Super GT.

== Schedule ==
Round	Race	Circuit	Date
1	Okayama GT; 300 km	(Japan) Okayama International Circuit	April 9
2	Fuji GT; 500 km	(Japan) Fuji Speedway	May 4
3	Autopolis GT; 300 km	(Japan) Autopolis	May 21
4	Sugo GT; 300 km	(Japan) Sportsland Sugo	July 23
5	Fuji GT; 300 km	(Japan) Fuji Speedway	August 6
6	46th International Suzuka 1000km 1000 km	(Japan) Suzuka Circuit	August 27
7	Buriram United Super GT Race; 300 km	(Thailand) Chang International Circuit	October 8
8	Motegi GT; 250 km	(Japan) Twin Ring Motegi	November 12

=== Calendar changes ===
- The series returned to Autopolis for the first time since 2015. The race scheduled to be held there in 2016 was cancelled due to damage caused to the circuit and local infrastructure by the 2016 Kumamoto earthquakes.
- This was the last season that the Suzuka 1000km is included as a round of Super GT, as the current 1000 km format would be dropped in favour of a 10-hour timed race for 2018. The new race will be aimed primarily at FIA GT3 and GT300 machinery.

2017 Japanese venues	2017 International venue

== Drivers and teams ==
=== GT500 ===
Team	Make	Car	Engine	No.	Drivers	Tyre	Rounds
(Japan) Lexus Team SARD	Lexus	Lexus LC500 GT500	Lexus RI4AG 2.0 L Turbo I4	1	(Japan) Kohei Hirate	B	All
(Japan) Lexus Team SARD	Lexus	Lexus LC500 GT500	Lexus RI4AG 2.0 L Turbo I4	1	(Finland) Heikki Kovalainen	B	All
(Japan) Lexus Team LeMans Wako's	Lexus	Lexus LC500 GT500	Lexus RI4AG 2.0 L Turbo I4	6	(Italy) Andrea Caldarelli	B	All
(Japan) Lexus Team LeMans Wako's	Lexus	Lexus LC500 GT500	Lexus RI4AG 2.0 L Turbo I4	6	(Japan) Kazuya Oshima	B	All
(Japan) Autobacs Racing Team Aguri	Honda	Honda NSX-GT	Honda HR-417E 2.0 L Turbo I4	8	(Japan) Tomoki Nojiri	B	All
(Japan) Autobacs Racing Team Aguri	Honda	Honda NSX-GT	Honda HR-417E 2.0 L Turbo I4	8	(Japan) Takashi Kobayashi	B	All
(Japan) Team Impul	Nissan	Nissan GT-R NISMO GT500	Nissan NR20A 2.0 L Turbo I4	12	(Japan) Hironobu Yasuda	B	All
(Japan) Team Impul	Nissan	Nissan GT-R NISMO GT500	Nissan NR20A 2.0 L Turbo I4	12	(United Kingdom) Jann Mardenborough	B	All
(Japan) Team Mugen	Honda	Honda NSX-GT	Honda HR-417E 2.0 L Turbo I4	16	(Japan) Hideki Mutoh	Y	All
(Japan) Team Mugen	Honda	Honda NSX-GT	Honda HR-417E 2.0 L Turbo I4	16	(Japan) Daisuke Nakajima	Y	All
(Japan) Team Mugen	Honda	Honda NSX-GT	Honda HR-417E 2.0 L Turbo I4	16	(United Kingdom) Jenson Button	Y	6
(Japan) REAL Racing	Honda	Honda NSX-GT	Honda HR-417E 2.0 L Turbo I4	17	(Japan) Koudai Tsukakoshi	B	All
(Japan) REAL Racing	Honda	Honda NSX-GT	Honda HR-417E 2.0 L Turbo I4	17	(Japan) Takashi Kogure	B	All
(Japan) Lexus Team WedsSport Bandoh	Lexus	Lexus LC500 GT500	Lexus RI4AG 2.0 L Turbo I4	19	(Japan) Yuhi Sekiguchi	Y	All
(Japan) Lexus Team WedsSport Bandoh	Lexus	Lexus LC500 GT500	Lexus RI4AG 2.0 L Turbo I4	19	(Japan) Yuji Kunimoto	Y	1, 3-8
(Japan) Lexus Team WedsSport Bandoh	Lexus	Lexus LC500 GT500	Lexus RI4AG 2.0 L Turbo I4	19	(Japan) Kenta Yamashita	Y	2
(Japan) Lexus Team WedsSport Bandoh	Lexus	Lexus LC500 GT500	Lexus RI4AG 2.0 L Turbo I4	19	(Japan) Kamui Kobayashi	Y	6
(Japan) NISMO	Nissan	Nissan GT-R NISMO GT500	Nissan NR20A 2.0 L Turbo I4	23	(Japan) Tsugio Matsuda	M	All
(Japan) NISMO	Nissan	Nissan GT-R NISMO GT500	Nissan NR20A 2.0 L Turbo I4	23	(Italy) Ronnie Quintarelli	M	All
(Japan) Kondo Racing	Nissan	Nissan GT-R NISMO GT500	Nissan NR20A 2.0 L Turbo I4	24	(Japan) Daiki Sasaki	Y	All
(Japan) Kondo Racing	Nissan	Nissan GT-R NISMO GT500	Nissan NR20A 2.0 L Turbo I4	24	(Brazil) João Paulo de Oliveira	Y	All
(Japan) Lexus Team au TOM'S	Lexus	Lexus LC500 GT500	Lexus RI4AG 2.0 L Turbo I4	36	(United Kingdom) James Rossiter	B	All
(Japan) Lexus Team au TOM'S	Lexus	Lexus LC500 GT500	Lexus RI4AG 2.0 L Turbo I4	36	(Japan) Kazuki Nakajima	B	1, 3-8
(Japan) Lexus Team au TOM'S	Lexus	Lexus LC500 GT500	Lexus RI4AG 2.0 L Turbo I4	36	(Japan) Daisuke Ito	B	2
(Japan) Lexus Team KeePer TOM'S	Lexus	Lexus LC500 GT500	Lexus RI4AG 2.0 L Turbo I4	37	(Japan) Ryo Hirakawa	B	All
(Japan) Lexus Team KeePer TOM'S	Lexus	Lexus LC500 GT500	Lexus RI4AG 2.0 L Turbo I4	37	(New Zealand) Nick Cassidy	B	All
(Japan) Lexus Team ZENT Cerumo	Lexus	Lexus LC500 GT500	Lexus RI4AG 2.0 L Turbo I4	38	(Japan) Hiroaki Ishiura	B	All
(Japan) Lexus Team ZENT Cerumo	Lexus	Lexus LC500 GT500	Lexus RI4AG 2.0 L Turbo I4	38	(Japan) Yuji Tachikawa	B	All
(Japan) MOLA	Nissan	Nissan GT-R NISMO GT500	Nissan NR20A 2.0 L Turbo I4	46	(Japan) Satoshi Motoyama	M	All
(Japan) MOLA	Nissan	Nissan GT-R NISMO GT500	Nissan NR20A 2.0 L Turbo I4	46	(Japan) Katsumasa Chiyo	M	All
(Japan) Nakajima Racing	Honda	Honda NSX-GT	Honda HR-417E 2.0 L Turbo I4	64	(Japan) Kosuke Matsuura	D	All
(Japan) Nakajima Racing	Honda	Honda NSX-GT	Honda HR-417E 2.0 L Turbo I4	64	(Belgium) Bertrand Baguette	D	All
(Japan) Team Kunimitsu	Honda	Honda NSX-GT	Honda HR-417E 2.0 L Turbo I4	100	(Japan) Naoki Yamamoto	B	All
(Japan) Team Kunimitsu	Honda	Honda NSX-GT	Honda HR-417E 2.0 L Turbo I4	100	(Japan) Takuya Izawa	B	All

=== GT300 ===
Team	Make	Car	Engine	No.	Drivers	Tyre	Rounds
(Japan) Cars Tokai Dream28	Lotus	Lotus Evora MC	GTA V8 4.5 L V8	2	(Japan) Kazuho Takahashi	Y	All
(Japan) Cars Tokai Dream28	Lotus	Lotus Evora MC	GTA V8 4.5 L V8	2	(Japan) Hiroki Katoh	Y	All
(Japan) Cars Tokai Dream28	Lotus	Lotus Evora MC	GTA V8 4.5 L V8	2	(Japan) Hiroshi Hamaguchi	Y	6
(Japan) NDDP Racing	Nissan	Nissan GT-R Nismo GT3 (2017)	Nissan VR38DETT 3.8 L Twin Turbo V6	3	(Japan) Kazuki Hoshino	Y	All
(Japan) NDDP Racing	Nissan	Nissan GT-R Nismo GT3 (2017)	Nissan VR38DETT 3.8 L Twin Turbo V6	3	(Japan) Mitsunori Takaboshi	Y	All
(Japan) Goodsmile Racing & TeamUKYO	Mercedes-AMG	Mercedes-AMG GT3	Mercedes-AMG M159 6.2 L V8	4	(Japan) Nobuteru Taniguchi	Y	All
(Japan) Goodsmile Racing & TeamUKYO	Mercedes-AMG	Mercedes-AMG GT3	Mercedes-AMG M159 6.2 L V8	4	(Japan) Tatsuya Kataoka	Y	All
(Japan) Team Mach	Toyota	Toyota 86 MC	GTA V8 4.5 L V8	5	(Japan) Natsu Sakaguchi	Y	All
(Japan) Team Mach	Toyota	Toyota 86 MC	GTA V8 4.5 L V8	5	(Japan) Kiyoto Fujinami	Y	All
(Japan) Team Mach	Toyota	Toyota 86 MC	GTA V8 4.5 L V8	5	(Japan) Junichirō Yamashita	Y	2
(Japan) Team Mach	Toyota	Toyota 86 MC	GTA V8 4.5 L V8	5	(Japan) Tetsuji Tamanaka	Y	6
(Japan) BMW Team Studie	BMW	BMW M6 GT3	BMW P63 4.4 L Twin Turbo V8	7	(Germany) Jörg Müller	Y	All
(Japan) BMW Team Studie	BMW	BMW M6 GT3	BMW P63 4.4 L Twin Turbo V8	7	(Japan) Seiji Ara	Y	All
(Japan) BMW Team Studie	BMW	BMW M6 GT3	BMW P63 4.4 L Twin Turbo V8	7	(Brazil) Augusto Farfus	Y	6
(Japan) Pacific with Gulf Racing	Porsche	Porsche 911 GT3-R	Porsche M97/80 4.0 L F6	9	(New Zealand) Jono Lester	Y	All
(Japan) Pacific with Gulf Racing	Porsche	Porsche 911 GT3-R	Porsche M97/80 4.0 L F6	9	(Japan) Kyosuke Mineo	Y	All
(Japan) GAINER	Nissan	Nissan GT-R Nismo GT3 (2017)	Nissan VR38DETT 3.8 L Twin Turbo V6	10	(Japan) Ryuichiro Tomita	D	All
(Japan) GAINER	Nissan	Nissan GT-R Nismo GT3 (2017)	Nissan VR38DETT 3.8 L Twin Turbo V6	10	(Japan) Hiroki Yoshida	D	All
(Japan) GAINER	Mercedes-AMG	Mercedes-AMG GT3	Mercedes-AMG M159 6.2 L V8	11	(Japan) Katsuyuki Hiranaka	D	All
(Japan) GAINER	Mercedes-AMG	Mercedes-AMG GT3	Mercedes-AMG M159 6.2 L V8	11	(Sweden) Björn Wirdheim	D	All
(Japan) Team Upgarage with Bandoh	Toyota	Toyota 86 MC	GTA V8 4.5 L V8	18	(Japan) Yuhki Nakayama	Y	All
(Japan) Team Upgarage with Bandoh	Toyota	Toyota 86 MC	GTA V8 4.5 L V8	18	(Japan) Shintarō Kawabata	Y	All
(Japan) Audi Sport Team Hitotsuyama	Audi	Audi R8 LMS	Audi DAR 5.2 L V10	21	(United Kingdom) Richard Lyons	D	All
(Japan) Audi Sport Team Hitotsuyama	Audi	Audi R8 LMS	Audi DAR 5.2 L V10	21	(Japan) Masataka Yanagida	D	All
(Japan) R'Qs Motor Sports	Mercedes-Benz	Mercedes-Benz SLS AMG GT3	Mercedes-Benz M159 6.2 L V8	22	(Japan) Masaki Jyonai	Y	1–3, 5–8
(Japan) R'Qs Motor Sports	Mercedes-Benz	Mercedes-Benz SLS AMG GT3	Mercedes-Benz M159 6.2 L V8	22	(Japan) Hisashi Wada	Y	1, 3, 5–8
(Japan) R'Qs Motor Sports	Mercedes-Benz	Mercedes-Benz SLS AMG GT3	Mercedes-Benz M159 6.2 L V8	22	(Japan) Hideto Yasuoka	Y	2
(Japan) VivaC Team Tsuchiya	Toyota	Toyota 86 MC	GTA V8 4.5 L V8	25	(Japan) Takamitsu Matsui	Y	All
(Japan) VivaC Team Tsuchiya	Toyota	Toyota 86 MC	GTA V8 4.5 L V8	25	(Japan) Kenta Yamashita	Y	1, 3–8
(Japan) VivaC Team Tsuchiya	Toyota	Toyota 86 MC	GTA V8 4.5 L V8	25	(Japan) Tsubasa Kondo	Y	2, 6
(Japan) Team Taisan SARD	Audi	Audi R8 LMS	Audi DAR 5.2 L V10	26	(Japan) Shinnosuke Yamada	Y	All
(Japan) Team Taisan SARD	Audi	Audi R8 LMS	Audi DAR 5.2 L V10	26	(Australia) Jake Parsons	Y	All
(Japan) Team Taisan SARD	Audi	Audi R8 LMS	Audi DAR 5.2 L V10	26	(Austria) Christian Klien	Y	6
(Japan) apr	Toyota	Toyota Prius apr GT	Toyota RV8KLM 3.4 L Hybrid V8	30	(Japan) Hiroaki Nagai	Y	All
(Japan) apr	Toyota	Toyota Prius apr GT	Toyota RV8KLM 3.4 L Hybrid V8	30	(Japan) Kota Sasaki	Y	All
(Japan) apr	Toyota	Toyota Prius apr GT	Toyota RV8KLM 3.4 L Hybrid V8	31	(Japan) Koki Saga	B	All
(Japan) apr	Toyota	Toyota Prius apr GT	Toyota RV8KLM 3.4 L Hybrid V8	31	(Japan) Rintarō Kubo	B	All
(Japan) D'station Racing	Porsche	Porsche 911 GT3-R	Porsche M97/80 4.0 L F6	33	(Japan) Tomonobu Fujii	Y	All
(Japan) D'station Racing	Porsche	Porsche 911 GT3-R	Porsche M97/80 4.0 L F6	33	(Germany) Sven Müller	Y	1–2, 6–8
(Japan) D'station Racing	Porsche	Porsche 911 GT3-R	Porsche M97/80 4.0 L F6	33	(Macau) André Couto	Y	3
(Japan) D'station Racing	Porsche	Porsche 911 GT3-R	Porsche M97/80 4.0 L F6	33	(Japan) Yuya Motojima	Y	4–5
Panther Team Thailand	Toyota	Toyota 86 MC	GTA V8 4.5 L V8	35	(Thailand) Nattavude Charoensukhawatana	Y	All
Panther Team Thailand	Toyota	Toyota 86 MC	GTA V8 4.5 L V8	35	(Thailand) Nattapong Horthongkum	Y	All
(Japan) Dijon Racing	Nissan	Nissan GT-R Nismo GT3 (2017)	Nissan VR38DETT 3.8 L Twin Turbo V6	48	(Japan) Masaki Tanaka	Y	All
(Japan) Dijon Racing	Nissan	Nissan GT-R Nismo GT3 (2017)	Nissan VR38DETT 3.8 L Twin Turbo V6	48	(Japan) Hiroshi Takamori	Y	1–4, 6–8
(Japan) Dijon Racing	Nissan	Nissan GT-R Nismo GT3 (2017)	Nissan VR38DETT 3.8 L Twin Turbo V6	48	(Japan) Taiyou Iida	Y	2, 5
(Japan) Dijon Racing	Nissan	Nissan GT-R Nismo GT3 (2017)	Nissan VR38DETT 3.8 L Twin Turbo V6	48	(Japan) Masami Kageyama	Y	6
(Japan) INGING & Arnage Racing	Ferrari	Ferrari 488 GT3	Ferrari F154CB 3.9 L Twin Turbo V8	50	(Japan) Akihiro Tsuzuki	Y	1, 3–8
(Japan) INGING & Arnage Racing	Ferrari	Ferrari 488 GT3	Ferrari F154CB 3.9 L Twin Turbo V8	50	(Japan) Morio Nitta	Y	1, 3–8
(Japan) LM corsa	Lexus	Lexus RC F GT3	Lexus 2UR-GSE 5.4 L V8	51	(Japan) Yuichi Nakayama	B	All
(Japan) LM corsa	Lexus	Lexus RC F GT3	Lexus 2UR-GSE 5.4 L V8	51	(Japan) Sho Tsuboi	B	All
(Japan) LM corsa	Lexus	Lexus RC F GT3	Lexus 2UR-GSE 5.4 L V8	60	(Japan) Akira Iida	Y	All
(Japan) LM corsa	Lexus	Lexus RC F GT3	Lexus 2UR-GSE 5.4 L V8	60	(Japan) Hiroki Yoshimoto	Y	All
(Japan) Saitama Toyopet Green Brave	Toyota	Toyota Mark X MC	GTA V8 4.5 L V8	52	(Japan) Taku Bamba	Y	All
(Japan) Saitama Toyopet Green Brave	Toyota	Toyota Mark X MC	GTA V8 4.5 L V8	52	(Japan) Shigekazu Wakisaka	Y	All
(Japan) Saitama Toyopet Green Brave	Toyota	Toyota Mark X MC	GTA V8 4.5 L V8	52	(Japan) Shogo Mitsuyama	Y	6
(Japan) Autobacs Racing Team Aguri	BMW	BMW M6 GT3	BMW P63 4.4 L Twin Turbo V8	55	(Japan) Shinichi Takagi	B	All
(Japan) Autobacs Racing Team Aguri	BMW	BMW M6 GT3	BMW P63 4.4 L Twin Turbo V8	55	(United Kingdom) Sean Walkinshaw	B	All
(Japan) R&D Sport	Subaru	Subaru BRZ R&D Sport	Subaru EJ20 2.0 L Turbo F4	61	(Japan) Takuto Iguchi	D	All
(Japan) R&D Sport	Subaru	Subaru BRZ R&D Sport	Subaru EJ20 2.0 L Turbo F4	61	(Japan) Hideki Yamauchi	D	All
(Japan) K2 R&D LEON Racing	Mercedes-AMG	Mercedes-AMG GT3	Mercedes-AMG M159 6.2 L V8	65	(Japan) Haruki Kurosawa	B	All
(Japan) K2 R&D LEON Racing	Mercedes-AMG	Mercedes-AMG GT3	Mercedes-AMG M159 6.2 L V8	65	(Japan) Naoya Gamou	B	All
(Japan) JLOC	Lamborghini	Lamborghini Huracán GT3	Lamborghini DFJ 5.2 L V10	87	(Japan) Shinya Hosokawa	Y	All
(Japan) JLOC	Lamborghini	Lamborghini Huracán GT3	Lamborghini DFJ 5.2 L V10	87	(Japan) Kimiya Sato	Y	All
(Japan) JLOC	Lamborghini	Lamborghini Huracán GT3	Lamborghini DFJ 5.2 L V10	87	(Japan) Yuya Motojima	Y	2, 6
(Japan) JLOC	Lamborghini	Lamborghini Huracán GT3	Lamborghini DFJ 5.2 L V10	88	(Japan) Manabu Orido	Y	All
(Japan) JLOC	Lamborghini	Lamborghini Huracán GT3	Lamborghini DFJ 5.2 L V10	88	(Japan) Kazuki Hiramine	Y	All
(Japan) JLOC	Lamborghini	Lamborghini Huracán GT3	Lamborghini DFJ 5.2 L V10	88	(Japan) Tsubasa Takahashi	Y	2
(Japan) JLOC	Lamborghini	Lamborghini Huracán GT3	Lamborghini DFJ 5.2 L V10	88	(Japan) Koji Yamanishi	Y	6
(Japan) Rn-sports	Mercedes-AMG	Mercedes-AMG GT3	Mercedes-AMG M159 6.2 L V8	111	(Japan) Keishi Ishikawa	Y	All
(Japan) Rn-sports	Mercedes-AMG	Mercedes-AMG GT3	Mercedes-AMG M159 6.2 L V8	111	(Japan) Ryōsei Yamashita	Y	All
(Japan) Rn-sports	Mercedes-AMG	Mercedes-AMG GT3	Mercedes-AMG M159 6.2 L V8	111	(Japan) Masayuki Ueda	Y	2, 6
(United Kingdom) EIcars Bentley TTO	Bentley	Bentley Continental GT3	Bentley CND 4.0 L Twin Turbo V8	117	(Japan) Yuji Ide	Y	1–3, 5–6, 8
(United Kingdom) EIcars Bentley TTO	Bentley	Bentley Continental GT3	Bentley CND 4.0 L Twin Turbo V8	117	(Japan) Ryohei Sakaguchi	Y	1–3, 5–6, 8
(Japan) Tomei Sports	Nissan	Nissan GT-R Nismo GT3 (2017)	Nissan VR38DETT 3.8 L Twin Turbo V6	360	(Japan) Yūsaku Shibata	Y	1–6, 8
(Japan) Tomei Sports	Nissan	Nissan GT-R Nismo GT3 (2017)	Nissan VR38DETT 3.8 L Twin Turbo V6	360	(Japan) Takayuki Aoki	Y	1–2, 4, 6, 8
(Japan) Tomei Sports	Nissan	Nissan GT-R Nismo GT3 (2017)	Nissan VR38DETT 3.8 L Twin Turbo V6	360	(Japan) Atsushi Tanaka	Y	2–3, 5–6

=== Vehicle changes ===
==== GT500 ====
- Lexus teams will race the new LC 500 machine, replacing the Lexus RC F which debuted in 2014. Nissan and Honda will continue to run the Nissan GT-R and Honda NSX-GT, modified to updated aerodynamic regulations. The updated NSX-GT will be based upon its newly launched production counterpart.

==== GT300 ====
- Saitama Toyopet GreenBrave announced that they will enter the Super GT Series for the first time in 2017, fielding a brand new Toyota Mark X based on the Mother Chassis platform.
- LM Corsa will field two 2017 specification Lexus RC F GT3s, replacing both their older model RC F GT3, and their Ferrari 488 GT3, used in 2016.
- Bentley and their Continental GT3 race car will make their Super GT debut with the new EIcars Bentley TTO (Teramoto Technical Office) team.

=== Entrant changes ===
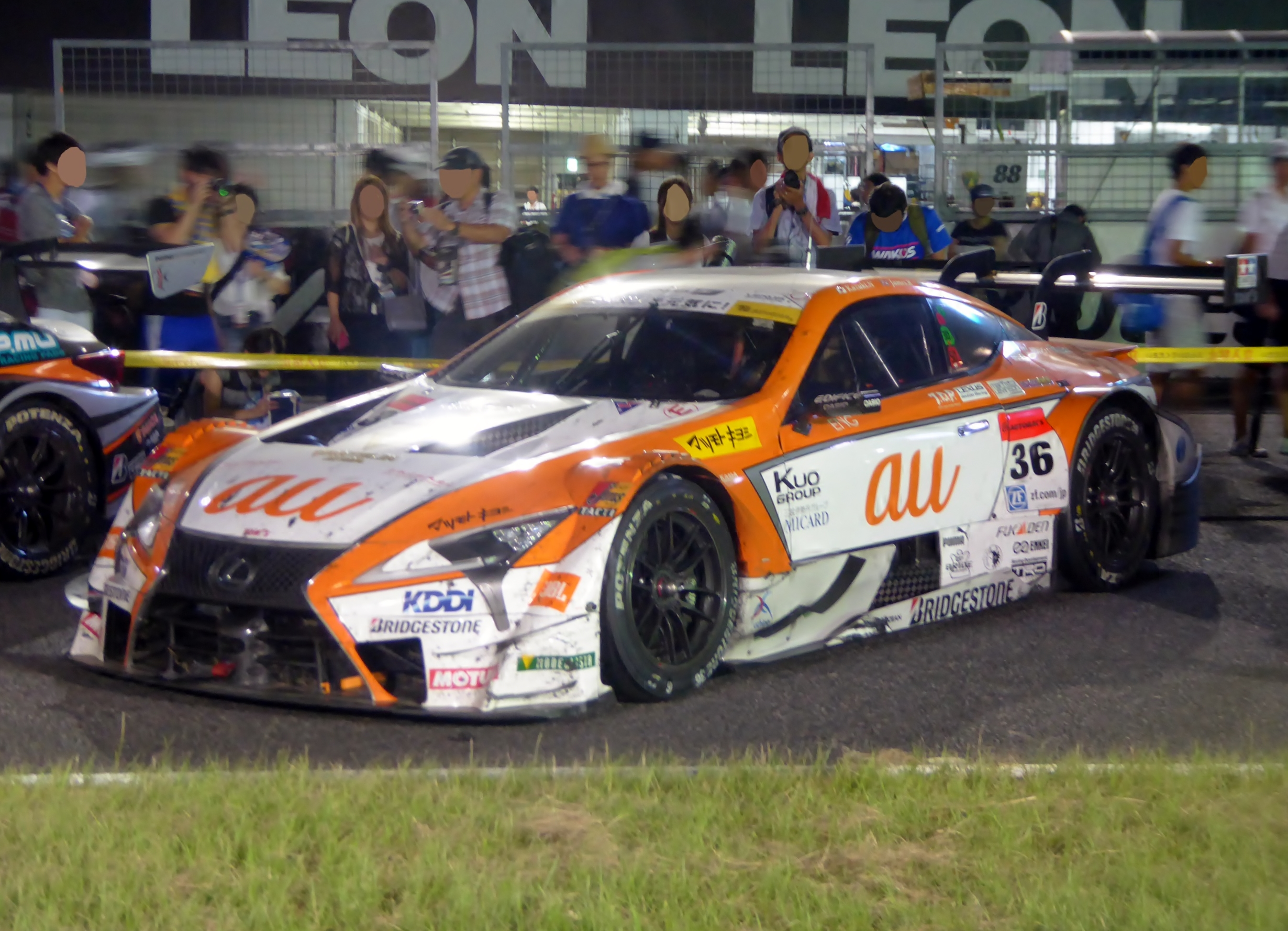
The Lexus LC500 made its debut in the GT500 class this season.

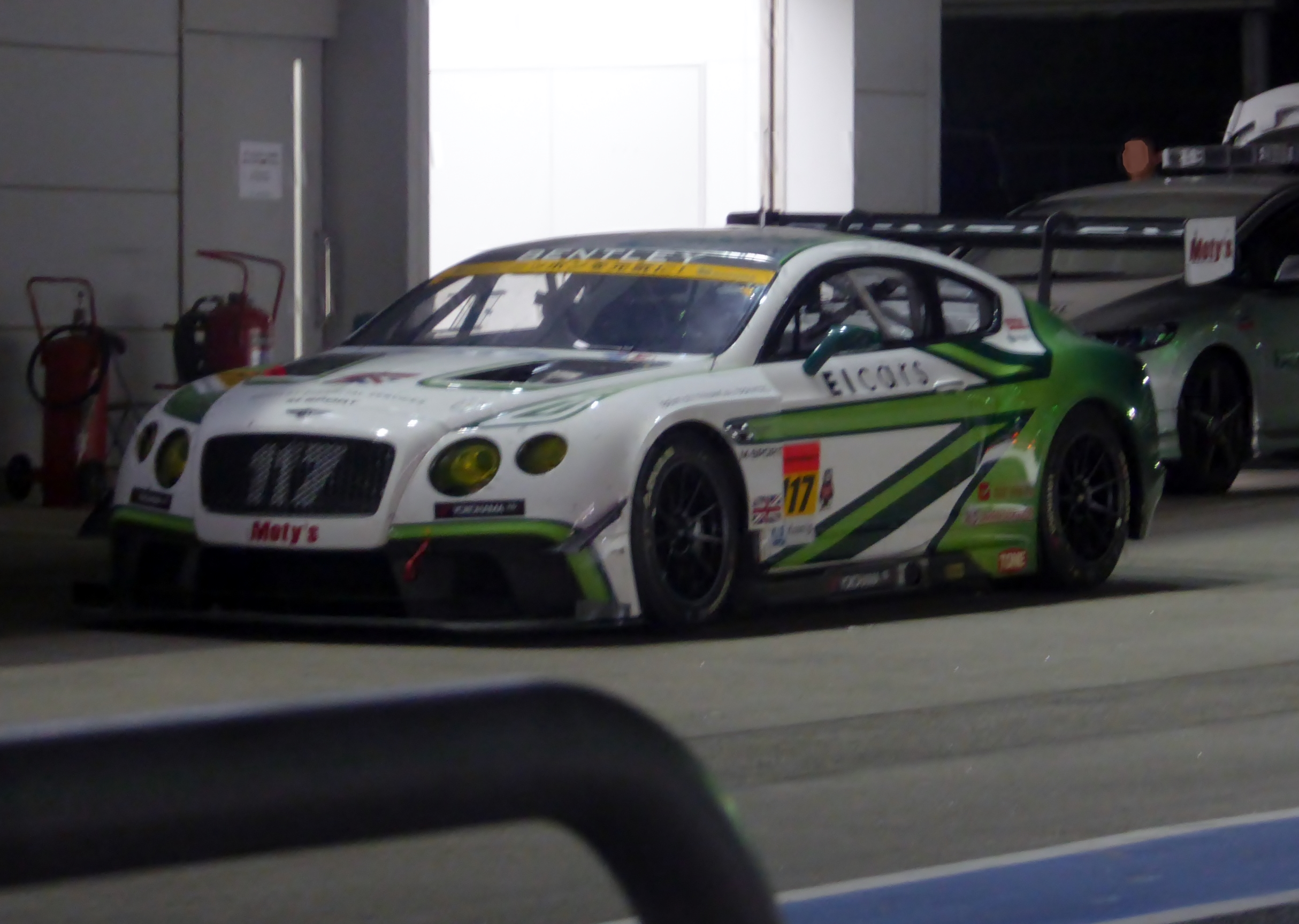
The Bentley Continental GT3 made their debuts in the GT300 class this season.

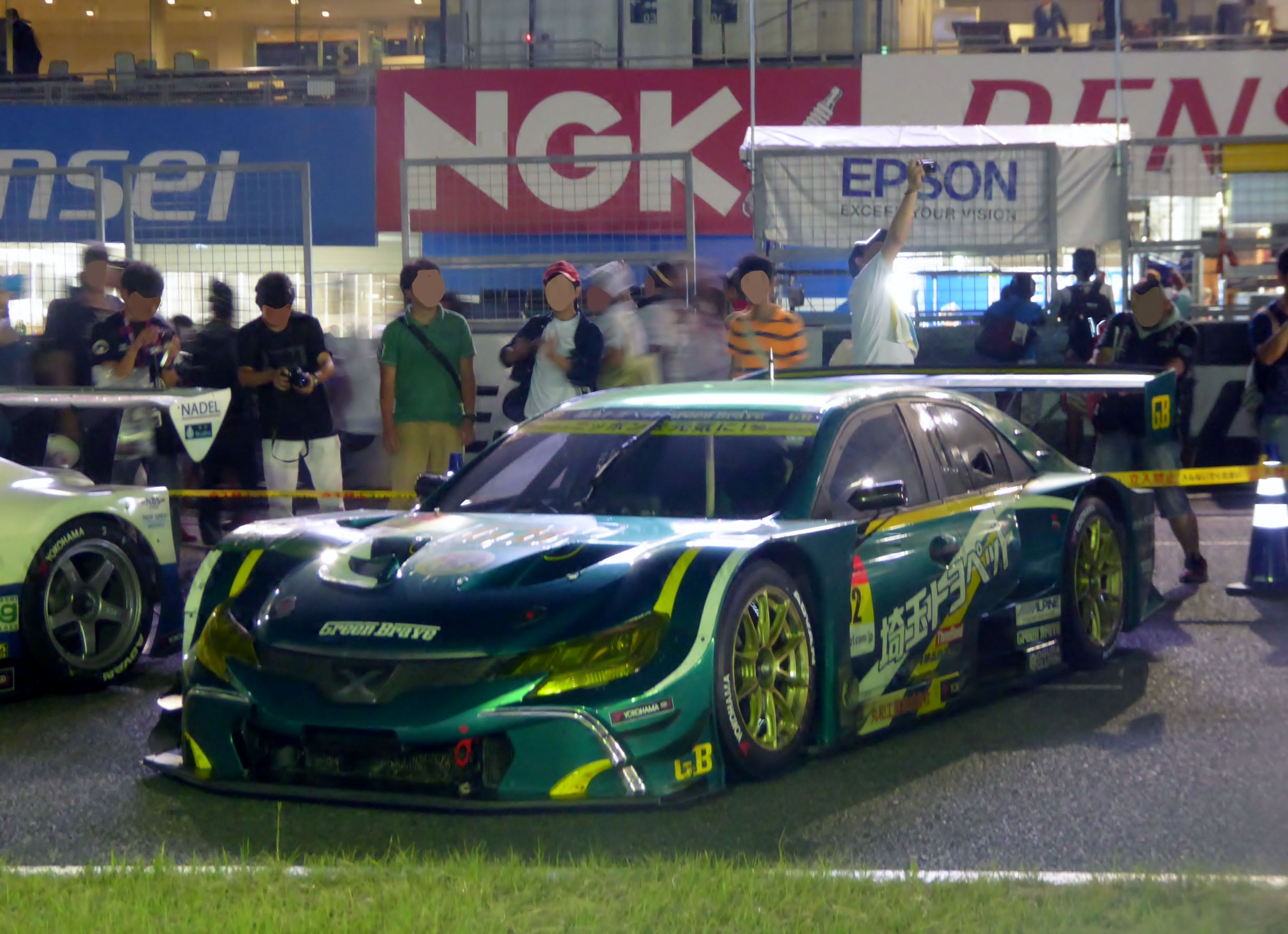
Toyota Mark X MC (right) made their debuts in the GT300 class this season.

==== GT500 ====
- Lexus:
  - Kazuki Nakajima returns to Super GT for the first time since 2014, driving for Lexus Team au TOM'S. He'll be joined by James Rossiter, who swaps seats at TOM'S with Nick Cassidy. Daisuke Ito will not drive full-time in Super GT this season, and will serve as the team director of Lexus Team au TOM's.
- Nissan:
  - Jann Mardenborough makes his GT500 debut with Team Impul, replacing João Paulo de Oliveira, who moves to Kondō Racing to replace Masataka Yanagida.
- Honda:
  - Team Mugen return to the GT500 category for the first time since 2003. The team run using Yokohama tyres.Hideki Mutoh and Daisuke Nakajima will drive for the revived Team Mugen in 2017.
  - Kosuke Matsuura moves to Nakajima Racing from ARTA, who promote Takashi Kobayashi from their GT300 team back to GT500 for the first time since 2012.
  - Drago Modulo Honda Racing announced their withdrawal from the series on 8 November 2016, after just two seasons. Oliver Turvey left Drago Modulo Honda Racing after five races in 2016, and will not return to Super GT in 2017. Tadasuke Makino who raced with Drago Corse for couple of rounds moves to the FIA European Formula 3 Championship with Hitech Grand Prix.

==== GT300 ====
- Masataka Yanagida moveS down to GT300 with Audi Team Hitotsuyama, replacing Tomonobu Fujii, who will drive for the newly christened D'Station Racing.
- Yuichi Nakayama moves from apr to LM Corsa and the new Lexus RC F GT3, and sophomore driver Rintaro Kubo will replace him in the #31 apr Toyota Prius.
- Hiroki Yoshida replaces former GT300 champion André Couto in the GAINER Nissan GT-R GT3.
- Shinnosuke Yamada will join Team Taisan SARD after spending one season at Team UpGarage with Bandoh.
- Both Akihiro Tsuzuki and three-time GT300 champion Morio Nitta leave LM Corsa to join the newly unified INGING and Arnage Racing team.
- Reigning All-Japan Formula Three champion Kenta Yamashita will return to Super GT full-time in 2017, replacing Takeshi Tsuchiya at VivaC Team Tsuchiya.
- Reigning Porsche Supercup and Porsche Carrera Cup Germany champion Sven Müller joined D'Station Racing as a Porsche factory driver. However, he would not drive between Rounds 3 and 5 due to his involvement in the ADAC GT Masters, during which André Couto would substitute for him.
- Former FIA F4 Japanese Champion Sho Tsuboi makes his Super GT debut with LM Corsa.
- Takayuki Hiranuma was set to make his Super GT debut with Saitama Toyopet GreenBrave, but withdrew before the season started.
- Shintaro Kawabata graduates from the FIA F4 Japanese Championship to Super GT with Team Upgarage with Bandoh.
- Sean Walkinshaw, son of legendary racing driver and team executive Tom Walkinshaw, will make his Super GT debut with Autobacs Racing Team Aguri in their BMW M6 GT3.
- Former Pro Mazda Championship driver Jake Parsons of Australia joins Team Taisan SARD for his first season in Super GT.
- Keishi Ishikawa and Ryosei Yamashita will each make their Super GT debuts with Rn-sports. Ishikawa graduates from All-Japan Formula Three, whilst Yamashita steps up from Super Taikyu and the Toyota 86/BRZ Race.
- Former Honda Formula Dream Project driver Natsu Sakaguchi, and former Nissan Driver Development Programme driver Kiyoto Fujinami will make their Super GT debuts for Team Mach.
- Nattavude Charoensukhawatana and Nattapong Horthongkum will run their first full seasons in Super GT in 2017 for Panther Team Thailand. Charoensukhawatana has run two races as a local wildcard driver, while Horthongkum is making his series debut.
- Mitsunori Takaboshi returns to Super GT full-time with NDDP Racing.
- After winning his first Super GT championship in 2016, Takeshi Tsuchiya retired from full-time driving. He will focus primarily on his role as chief engineer for VivaC Team Tsuchiya.
- Yuji Ide returns to Super GT for the first time since 2015 with EIcars Bentley TTO.
- 2011 GT300 champion Taku Bamba will return to Super GT for the first time since 2012, driving for Saitama Toyopet GreenBrave.

==== Mid-season changes ====
- At the Suzuka 1000 km, former Formula 1 driver Kamui Kobayashi makes his Super GT debut in a one-off for Lexus Team WedsSport Bandoh. 2009 Formula 1 champion Jenson Button also makes his Super GT debut in a one-off for Team Mugen.
- Daisuke Ito drives at the second round of the championship at Fuji Speedway, replacing Kazuki Nakajima, who would instead compete in the 6 Hours of Spa-Francorchamps.
- After André Couto was seriously injured during a round of the China GT Championship held at Zhuhai, D'Station Racing announced Yūya Motojima would replace Couto as substitute driver for Sven Muller, driving in Rounds 4 and 5.
- K2 R&D LEON Racing will switch from Yokohama to Bridgestone tyres in 2017.
- Excellence Porsche Team KTR changed their name to D'Station Racing following a change of ownership and title sponsors. Former baseball pitcher Kazuhiro Sasaki will serve as the team's general representative.
- INGING Motorsport and Arnage Racing will enter under a unified banner in 2017, with the ex-LM Corsa Ferrari 488 GT3 used last season.
- Lamborghini Team Direction have suspended activities in Super GT for the 2017 season, leaving JLOC as the sole representative for Lamborghini in Super GT.

== Results ==
Round	Circuit	Date	Class	Pole position	Race winner
1	(Japan) Okayama International Circuit; Report	9 April	GT500	No. 8 ARTA NSX	No. 37 KeePer TOM'S LC500
1	(Japan) Okayama International Circuit; Report	9 April	GT500	(Japan) Takashi Kobayashi (Japan) Tomoki Nojiri	(New Zealand) Nick Cassidy (Japan) Ryō Hirakawa
1	(Japan) Okayama International Circuit; Report	9 April	GT300	No. 65 LEON Racing AMG GT3	No. 4 Goodsmile Racing AMG GT3
1	(Japan) Okayama International Circuit; Report	9 April	GT300	(Japan) Naoya Gamou (Japan) Haruki Kurosawa	(Japan) Tatsuya Kataoka (Japan) Nobuteru Taniguchi
2	(Japan) Fuji Speedway; Report	4 May	GT500	No. 38 Lexus Team ZENT Cerumo LC500	No. 38 Lexus Team ZENT Cerumo LC500
2	(Japan) Fuji Speedway; Report	4 May	GT500	(Japan) Hiroaki Ishiura (Japan) Yuji Tachikawa	(Japan) Hiroaki Ishiura (Japan) Yuji Tachikawa
2	(Japan) Fuji Speedway; Report	4 May	GT300	No. 4 Goodsmile Racing AMG GT3	No. 51 LM corsa RC F GT3
2	(Japan) Fuji Speedway; Report	4 May	GT300	(Japan) Tatsuya Kataoka (Japan) Nobuteru Taniguchi	(Japan) Yuichi Nakayama (Japan) Sho Tsuboi
3	(Japan) Autopolis; Report	21 May	GT500	No. 100 Team Kunimitsu	No. 36 Lexus Team au TOM'S
3	(Japan) Autopolis; Report	21 May	GT500	(Japan) Takuya Izawa (Japan) Naoki Yamamoto	(Japan) Kazuki Nakajima (United Kingdom) James Rossiter
3	(Japan) Autopolis; Report	21 May	GT300	No. 25 VivaC Team Tsuchiya	No. 25 VivaC Team Tsuchiya
3	(Japan) Autopolis; Report	21 May	GT300	(Japan) Takamitsu Matsui (Japan) Kenta Yamashita	(Japan) Takamitsu Matsui (Japan) Kenta Yamashita
4	(Japan) Sportsland Sugo; Report	23 July	GT500	No. 8 ARTA NSX	No. 1 Lexus Team SARD
4	(Japan) Sportsland Sugo; Report	23 July	GT500	(Japan) Takashi Kobayashi (Japan) Tomoki Nojiri	(Japan) Kohei Hirate (Finland) Heikki Kovalainen
4	(Japan) Sportsland Sugo; Report	23 July	GT300	No. 25 VivaC Team Tsuchiya	No. 11 Gainer AMG GT3
4	(Japan) Sportsland Sugo; Report	23 July	GT300	(Japan) Takamitsu Matsui (Japan) Kenta Yamashita	(Japan) Katsuyuki Hiranaka (Sweden) Bjorn Wirdheim
5	(Japan) Fuji Speedway; Report	6 August	GT500	No. 8 ARTA NSX	No. 8 ARTA NSX
5	(Japan) Fuji Speedway; Report	6 August	GT500	(Japan) Takashi Kobayashi (Japan) Tomoki Nojiri	(Japan) Takashi Kobayashi (Japan) Tomoki Nojiri
5	(Japan) Fuji Speedway; Report	6 August	GT300	No. 55 ARTA BMW M6 GT3	No. 55 ARTA BMW M6 GT3
5	(Japan) Fuji Speedway; Report	6 August	GT300	(Japan) Shinichi Takagi (United Kingdom) Sean Walkinshaw	(Japan) Shinichi Takagi (United Kingdom) Sean Walkinshaw
6	(Japan) Suzuka Circuit; Report	27 August	GT500	No. 24 Kondo Racing	No. 64 Nakajima Racing
6	(Japan) Suzuka Circuit; Report	27 August	GT500	(Brazil) João Paulo de Oliveira (Japan) Daiki Sasaki	(Belgium) Bertrand Baguette (Japan) Kosuke Matsuura
6	(Japan) Suzuka Circuit; Report	27 August	GT300	No. 25 VivaC Team Tsuchiya	No. 65 LEON Racing AMG GT3
6	(Japan) Suzuka Circuit; Report	27 August	GT300	(Japan) Takamitsu Matsui (Japan) Kenta Yamashita (Japan) Tsubasa Kondo	(Japan) Naoya Gamou (Japan) Haruki Kurosawa
7	(Thailand) Chang International Circuit; Report	8 October	GT500	No. 37 KeePer TOM'S LC500	No. 37 KeePer TOM'S LC500
7	(Thailand) Chang International Circuit; Report	8 October	GT500	(New Zealand) Nick Cassidy (Japan) Ryō Hirakawa	(New Zealand) Nick Cassidy (Japan) Ryō Hirakawa
7	(Thailand) Chang International Circuit; Report	8 October	GT300	No. 21 Audi Team Hitotsuyama	No. 51 LM corsa RC F GT3
7	(Thailand) Chang International Circuit; Report	8 October	GT300	(United Kingdom) Richard Lyons (Japan) Masataka Yanagida	(Japan) Yuichi Nakayama (Japan) Sho Tsuboi
8	(Japan) Twin Ring Motegi; Report	13 November	GT500	No. 23 NISMO	No. 23 NISMO
8	(Japan) Twin Ring Motegi; Report	13 November	GT500	(Japan) Tsugio Matsuda (Italy) Ronnie Quintarelli	(Japan) Tsugio Matsuda (Italy) Ronnie Quintarelli
8	(Japan) Twin Ring Motegi; Report	13 November	GT300	No. 4 Goodsmile Racing AMG GT3	No. 65 LEON Racing AMG GT3
8	(Japan) Twin Ring Motegi; Report	13 November	GT300	(Japan) Tatsuya Kataoka (Japan) Nobuteru Taniguchi	(Japan) Naoya Gamou (Japan) Haruki Kurosawa

== Championship standings ==
=== Drivers' championships ===
Scoring system

Position	1st	2nd	3rd	4th	5th	6th	7th	8th	9th	10th	Pole
Points	20	15	11	8	6	5	4	3	2	1	1
Suzuka	25	18	13	10	8	6	5	4	3	2	1

==== GT500 ====
Driver Ranking GT500 2017 Series
Rank	Driver	OKA (Japan)	FUJ (Japan)	AUT (Japan)	SUG (Japan)	FUJ (Japan)	SUZ (Japan)	CHA (Thailand)	MOT (Japan)	Points
1	(Japan) Ryō Hirakawa (New Zealand) Nick Cassidy	1	3	6	10	6	6	1	2	84
2	(Japan) Tsugio Matsuda (Italy) Ronnie Quintarelli	7	4	5	4	2	2	9	1	82
3	(Japan) Kazuya Oshima (Italy) Andrea Caldarelli	2	2	13	3	9	7	2	13	63
4	(Japan) Yuji Tachikawa (Japan) Hiroaki Ishiura	4	1	10	13	3	10	4	3	62
5	(United Kingdom) James Rossiter	5	5	1	7	4	9	5	14	53
6	(Japan) Kazuki Nakajima	5		1	7	4	9	5	14	47
7	(Japan) Naoki Yamamoto (Japan) Takuya Izawa	Ret	6	3	9	8	3	7	5	45
8	(Japan) Kohei Hirate (Finland) Heikki Kovalainen	3	7	14	1	10	13	6	8	44
9	(Japan) Tomoki Nojiri (Japan) Takashi Kobayashi	DNS	9	Ret	5	1	8	11	9	37
10	(Japan) Koudai Tsukakoshi (Japan) Takashi Kogure	11	8	2	Ret	Ret	15	3	4	37
11	(Belgium) Bertrand Baguette (Japan) Kosuke Matsuura	12	13	12	8	12	1	8	10	32
12	(Japan) Satoshi Motoyama (Japan) Katsumasa Chiyo	Ret	11	4	2	11	14	10	6	29
13	(Japan) Yuhi Sekiguchi	6	10	8	12	7	4	12	15	23
14	(Japan) Yuji Kunimoto	6		8	12	7	4	12	15	22
15	(Japan) Hironobu Yasuda (United Kingdom) Jann Mardenborough	8	14	7	11	5	11	14	7	17
16	(Japan) Daiki Sasaki (Brazil) João Paulo de Oliveira	10	12	9	Ret	13	5	Ret	12	12
17	(Japan) Kamui Kobayashi						4			10
18	(Japan) Hideki Mutoh (Japan) Daisuke Nakajima	9	15	11	6	Ret	12	13	11	7
19	(Japan) Daisuke Ito		5							6
20	(Japan) Kenta Yamashita		10							1
–	(United Kingdom) Jenson Button						12			0
Rank	Driver	OKA (Japan)	FUJ (Japan)	AUT (Japan)	SUG (Japan)	FUJ (Japan)	SUZ (Japan)	CHA (Thailand)	MOT (Japan)	Points

Colour	Result
Gold	Winner
Silver	Second place
Bronze	Third place
Green	Points classification
Blue	Non-points classification
Blue	Non-classified finish (NC)
Purple	Retired, not classified (Ret)
Red	Did not qualify (DNQ)
Red	Did not pre-qualify (DNPQ)
Black	Disqualified (DSQ)
White	Did not start (DNS)
White	Withdrew (WD)
White	Race cancelled (C)
Blank	Did not practice (DNP)
Blank	Did not arrive (DNA)
Blank	Excluded (EX)

==== GT300 ====
Driver Ranking GT300 2017 Series
Rank	Driver	OKA (Japan)	FUJ (Japan)	AUT (Japan)	SUG (Japan)	FUJ (Japan)	SUZ (Japan)	CHA (Thailand)	MOT (Japan)	Points
1	(Japan) Nobuteru Taniguchi (Japan) Tatsuya Kataoka	1	11	5	4	2	19	2	3	77
2	(Japan) Naoya Gamou (Japan) Haruki Kurosawa	2	5	10	7	13	1	13	1	72
3	(Japan) Yuichi Nakayama (Japan) Sho Tsuboi	8	1	6	13	9	6	1	6	61
4	(Japan) Shinichi Takagi (United Kingdom) Sean Walkinshaw	5	17	3	Ret	1	Ret	4	2	61
5	(Japan) Takamitsu Matsui (Japan) Kenta Yamashita	4	15	1	3	29	18	15	5	48
6	(Japan) Katsuyuki Hiranaka (Sweden) Bjorn Wirdheim	18	2	22	1	17	9	8	7	45
7	(Japan) Tomonobu Fujii	9	3	7	15	8	10	3	9	35
8	(New Zealand) Jono Lester (Japan) Kyosuke Mineo	3	10	17	10	5	8	14	4	31
9	(Japan) Takuto Iguchi (Japan) Hideki Yamauchi	Ret	13	2	9	4	7	Ret	Ret	30
10	(Japan) Manabu Orido (Japan) Kazuki Hiramine	19	25	16	Ret	7	2	5	Ret	28
11	(Germany) Sven Müller	9	3				10	3	9	28
12	(Japan) Yuya Motojima		4		15	8	3			24
13	(Japan) Akira Iida (Japan) Hiroki Yoshimoto	22	8	12	5	27	4	6	18	24
14	(Japan) Shinya Hosokawa (Japan) Kimiya Sato	11	4	18	19	12	3	12	11	21
15	(Germany) Jörg Müller (Japan) Seiji Ara	13	7	4	16	6	11	10	13	18
16	(Japan) Koki Saga (Japan) Rintarō Kubo	10	12	Ret	10	3	Ret	11	12	17
17	(Japan) Kazuki Hoshino (Japan) Mitsunori Takaboshi	7	6	9	8	Ret	14	9	10	17
18	(Japan) Akihiro Tsuzuki (Japan) Morio Nitta	Ret		27	2	14	16	17	21	15
19	(Japan) Ryuichiro Tomita (Japan) Hiroki Yoshida	6	24	15	21	16	5		19	13
20	(Japan) Yuhki Nakayama (Japan) Shintarō Kawabata	12	9	Ret	17	11	15	7	16	6
21	(United Kingdom) Richard Lyons (Japan) Masataka Yanagida	14	14	13	20	10	Ret	23	8	5
22	(Macau) André Couto			7						4
23	(Japan) Natsu Sakaguchi (Japan) Kiyoto Fujinami	17	19	8	12	28	22		15	3
24	(Japan) Tsubasa Kondo						18			1
–	(Japan) Kōji Yamanishi						2 (Note: Kōji Yamanishi did not run during the race as a third driver and was ineligible for championship points.)			0
–	(Japan) Yūsaku Shibata	15		23	11	22	17		17	0
–	(Japan) Takayuki Aoki	15			11		17		17	0
–	(Japan) Hiroaki Nagai (Japan) Kōta Sasaki	Ret	26	11	23	20	24	16	Ret	0
–	(Brazil) Augusto Farfus						11			0
–	(Japan) Taku Bamba (Japan) Shigekazu Wakisaka	Ret	27	20	14	23	12	22	20	0
–	(Japan) Shōgo Mitsuyama						12			0
–	(Japan) Keishi Ishikawa (Japan) Ryōsei Yamashita	16	18	25	Ret	15	13		23	0
–	(Japan) Masayuki Ueda		18				13			0
–	(Japan) Shinnosuke Yamada (Australia) Jake Parsons	21	21	14	18	19	Ret	19	14	0
–	(Japan) Yūji Ide (Japan) Ryōhei Sakaguchi	20	16	19		18	Ret		22	0
–	(Japan) Atsushi Tanaka			23		22	17			0
–	(Japan) Junichirō Yamashita		19							0
–	(Japan) Masaki Tanaka	25	20	21	22	21	Ret		26	0
–	(Japan) Hiroshi Takamori	25	20	21	22		Ret		26	0
–	(Thailand) Nattavude Charoensukhawatana (Thailand) Nattapong Horthongkum	23	Ret	Ret	Ret	25	20	21	24	0
–	(Japan) Taiyou Iida		20			21				0
–	(Japan) Kazuho Takahashi (Japan) Hiroki Katoh	26	22	24	Ret	24	23	20	Ret	0
–	(Japan) Masaki Jyonai	24	23	26		26	21		25	0
–	(Japan) Hisashi Wada	24		26		26	21		25	0
–	(Japan) Tetsuji Tamanaka						22			0
–	(Japan) Hideto Yasuoka		23							0
–	(Japan) Hiroshi Hamaguchi						23			0
–	(Japan) Tsubasa Takahashi		25							0
–	(Japan) Masami Kageyama						Ret			0
–	(Austria) Christian Klien						Ret			0
Rank	Driver	OKA (Japan)	FUJ (Japan)	AUT (Japan)	SUG (Japan)	FUJ (Japan)	SUZ (Japan)	CHA (Thailand)	MOT (Japan)	Points

=== Teams' championships ===
Scoring system

Position	1st	2nd	3rd	4th	5th	6th	7th	8th	9th	10th
Points	20	15	11	8	6	5	4	3	2	1
Suzuka	25	18	13	10	8	6	5	4	3	2

Class	Finished on lead lap	1 lap behind	2 or more laps behind
GT500	3	2	1
GT300	3		1

==== GT500 ====
Team Ranking GT500 2017 Series
Rank	No.	Team	OKA (Japan)	FUJ (Japan)	AUT (Japan)	SUG (Japan)	FUJ (Japan)	SUZ (Japan)	CHA (Thailand)	MOT (Japan)	Points
1	37	Lexus Team KeePer TOM'S	1	3	6	10	6	6	1	2	105
2	23	Nismo	7	4	5	4	2	2	9	1	103
3	6	Lexus Team LeMans Wako's	2	2	13	3	9	7	2	13	82
4	38	Lexus Team ZENT Cerumo	4	1	10	13	3	10	4	3	81
5	36	Lexus Team au TOM'S	5	5	1	7	4	9	5	14	73
6	1	Lexus Team SARD	3	7	14	1	10	13	6	8	64
7	100	Team Kunimitsu	Ret	6	3	9	8	3	7	5	63
8	17	REAL Racing	11	8	2	Ret	Ret	15	3	4	51
9	8	Autobacs Racing Team Aguri	DNS	9	Ret	5	1	8	11	9	50
10	64	Nakajima Racing	12	13	12	8	12	1	8	10	50
11	46	MOLA	Ret	11	4	2	11	14	10	6	46
12	19	Lexus Team WedsSport Bandoh	6	10	8	12	7	4	12	15	41
13	12	Team Impul	8	14	7	11	5	11	14	7	33
14	24	Kondo Racing	10	12	9	Ret	13	5	Ret	12	24
15	16	Team Mugen	9	15	11	6	Ret	12	13	11	20
Rank	No.	Team	OKA (Japan)	FUJ (Japan)	AUT (Japan)	SUG (Japan)	FUJ (Japan)	SUZ (Japan)	CHA (Thailand)	MOT (Japan)	Points

Colour	Result
Gold	Winner
Silver	2nd place
Bronze	3rd place
Green	4th to 10th place
Blue	Finish below 10th place
Blue	Non-classified finish (NC)
Purple	Retired (Ret)
Red	Did not qualify (DNQ)
Red	Did not pre-qualify (DNPQ)
Black	Disqualified (DSQ)
White	Did not start (DNS)
White	Withdrew (WD)
White	Race cancelled (C)
Blank	Did not participate (DNP)
Blank	Excluded (EX)

==== GT300 ====
Team Ranking GT300 2017 Series
Rank	No.	Team	OKA (Japan)	FUJ (Japan)	AUT (Japan)	SUG (Japan)	FUJ (Japan)	SUZ (Japan)	CHA (Thailand)	MOT (Japan)	Points
1	4	Goodsmile Racing & TeamUKYO	1	11	5	4	2	19	2	3	97
2	65	K2 R&D LEON Racing	2	5	10	7	13	1	13	1	95
3	51	LM corsa	8	1	6	13	9	6	1	6	85
4	55	Autobacs Racing Team Aguri	5	17	3	Ret	1	Ret	4	2	76
5	11	GAINER	18	2	22	1	17	9	8	7	65
6	25	VivaC Team Tsuchiya	4	15	1	3	29	18	15	5	65
7	33	D'station Racing	9	3	7	15	8	10	3	9	59
8	9	Pacific with Gulf Racing	3	10	17	10	5	8	14	4	53
9	61	R&D Sport	Ret	13	2	9	4	7	Ret	Ret	45
10	88	JLOC	19	25	16	Ret	7	2	5	Ret	44
11	60	LM corsa	22	8	12	5	27	4	6	18	44
12	87	JLOC	11	4	18	19	12	3	12	11	41
13	7	BMW Team Studie	13	7	4	16	6	11	10	13	40
14	3	NDDP Racing	7	6	9	8	Ret	14	9	10	36
15	31	apr	10	12	Ret	10	3	Ret	12	12	35
16	50	INGING & Arnage Racing	Ret		27	2	14	16	17	21	29
17	10	Gainer	6	24	15	21	16	5	18	19	29
18	18	Team Upgarage with Bandoh	12	9	Ret	17	11	15	7	16	23
19	21	Audi Team Hitotsuyama	14	14	13	20	10	Ret	23	8	21
20	5	Team Mach	17	19	8	12	28	22		15	18
21	52	Saitama Toyopet Green Brave	Ret	27	20	14	23	12	22	20	13
22	360	Tomei Sports	15	WD	23	11	22	17		17	12
23	111	Rn-sports	16	18	25	Ret	15	13		23	12
24	26	Team Taisan SARD	21	21	14	18	19	Ret	19	14	11
25	30	apr	Ret	26	11	23	20	24	16	Ret	10
26	117	EIcars Bentley TTO	20	16	19		18	Ret		22	9
27	22	R'Qs Motor Sports	24	23	26		26	21		25	8
28	35	Panther Team Thailand	23	Ret	Ret	Ret	25	20	21	24	7
29	48	Dijon Racing	25	20	21	22	21	Ret		26	6
30	2	Cars Tokai Dream28	26	22	24	Ret	24	23	20	Ret	6
Rank	No.	Team	OKA (Japan)	FUJ (Japan)	AUT (Japan)	SUG (Japan)	FUJ (Japan)	SUZ (Japan)	CHA (Thailand)	MOT (Japan)	Points
