= 2017 Okayama GT 300km =

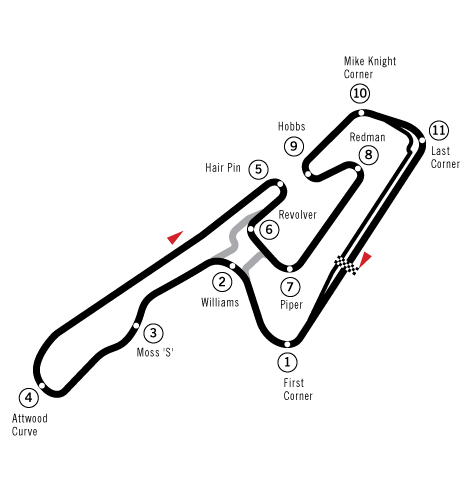
Layout of the Okayama International Circuit

The 2017 Okayama GT 300km was the first round of the 2017 Super GT Series. It was held at the Okayama International Circuit in Mimasaka, Okayama Prefecture, Japan. Ryō Hirakawa and Nick Cassidy won the GT500 category whilst Nobuteru Taniguchi and Tatsuya Kataoka won the GT300 category.

== Race Report ==
=== Qualifying ===
The #8 Autobacs Racing Team Aguri entry of Tomoki Nojiri and Takashi Kobayashi claimed pole position with the time of 1:20.604. The session itself was filled with attrition, with two red flags as well as varying weather conditions ultimately determining the final part of qualifying. Daisuke Nakajima's best time was erased due to causing a red flag, thereby dropping the #16 Team Mugen entry down to seventh. The other red flag was caused by Kazuki Nakajima, whose best time was also erased; dropping him to eighth.

In the GT300 category, the front-row was locked out by a pair of Mercedes-AMG GT3's, with the #65 K2 R&D LEON Racing entry of Naoya Gamou and Haruki Kurosawa claiming pole position and the #4 Goodsmile Racing & TeamUKYO taking out second.

==== GT500 ====
Pos	No	Team	Vehicle	Qualifying 1	Qualifying 2	Grid
1	8	Autobacs Racing Team Aguri	Honda NSX-GT	1:18.620	1:20.604	1
2	6	Lexus Team LeMans Wako's	Lexus LC 500	1:18.558	1:20.960	2
3	37	Lexus Team KeePer Tom's	Lexus LC 500	1:18.584	1:24.749	3
4	38	Lexus Team ZENT Cerumo	Lexus LC 500	1:18.521	1:25.098	4
5	17	Real Racing	Honda NSX-GT	1:18.648	1:26.930	5
6	19	Lexus Team WedsSport Bandoh	Lexus LC 500	1:18.648	1'28.347	6
7	16	Team Mugen	Honda NSX-GT	1:18.846	no time	7
8	36	Lexus Team au Tom's	Lexus LC 500	1:18.975	no time	8
9	1	Lexus Team SARD	Lexus LC 500	1:19.072		9
10	100	Team Kunimitsu	Honda NSX-GT	1:19.089		10
11	24	Kondō Racing	Nissan GT-R	1:19.234		11
12	64	Nakajima Racing	Honda NSX-GT	1:19.269		12
13	12	Team Impul	Nissan GT-R	1:19.315		13
14	23	NISMO	Nissan GT-R	1:19.386		14
15	46	MOLA	Nissan GT-R	1:19.616		15

==== GT300 ====
Pos	No	Team	Vehicle	Qualifying 1	Qualifying 2	Grid
1	65	K2 R&D LEON Racing	Mercedes-AMG GT3	1:26.254	1:25.044	1
2	4	Goodsmile Racing & TeamUKYO	Mercedes-AMG GT3	1:25.825	1:25.166	2
3	25	VivaC Team Tsuchiya	Toyota 86 MC	1:26.362	1:25.473	3
4	51	LM corsa	Lexus RC F GT3	1:26.374	1:25.801	4
5	88	JLOC	Lamborghini Huracán GT3	1:26.723	1:26.244	5
6	61	R&D Sport	Subaru BRZ R&D Sport	1:26.898	1:26.248	6
7	87	JLOC	Lamborghini Huracán GT3	1:26.552	1:26.484	7
8	11	Gainer	Mercedes-AMG GT3	1:26.594	1:26.512	8
9	31	apr	Toyota Prius apr GT	1:26.631	1:26.686	9
10	10	Gainer	Nissan GT-R GT3	1:26.941	1:26.912	10
11	50	INGING Motorsport & Arnage Racing	Ferrari 488 GT3	1:26.803	1:27.046	11
12	21	Audi Sport Team Hitotsuyama	Audi R8 LMS	1:26.838	1:27.896	12
13	2	Cars Tokai Dream28	Lotus Evora MC	1:26.170	1:28.010	13
14	30	apr	Toyota Prius apr GT	1:26.207	no time	14
15	9	Pacific with Gulf Racing	Porsche 911 GT3-R	1:26.955		15
16	3	NDDP Racing	Nissan GT-R GT3	1:27.002		16
17	5	Team Mach	Toyota 86 MC	1:27.006		17
18	55	Autobacs Racing Team Aguri	BMW M6 GT3	1:27.054		18
19	33	D'station Racing	Porsche 911 GT3-R	1:27.096		19
20	18	Team Upgarage with Bandoh	Toyota 86 MC	1:27.159		20
21	111	Rn-sports	Mercedes-AMG GT3	1:27.252		21
22	60	LM corsa	Lexus RC F GT3	1:27.461		22
23	117	EIcars Bentley TTO	Bentley Continental GT3	1:27.586		23
24	360	Tomei Sports	Nissan GT-R GT3	1:27.746		24
25	26	Team Taisan SARD	Audi R8 LMS	1:28.186		25
26	22	R'Qs Motor Sports	Mercedes-Benz SLS AMG GT3	1:28.485		26
27	48	Dijon Racing	Nissan GT-R GT3	1:28.585		27
28	35	Panther Team Thailand	Toyota 86 MC	1:29.157		28
	52	Saitama Toyopet Green Brave	Toyota Mark X MC	no time		29
	7	BMW Team Studie	BMW M6 GT3	no time		30

=== Race ===
In what was a dominant display by the Lexus brand, the opening round of the Super GT season was won by the Lexus Team KeePer Tom's duo of Ryō Hirakawa and Nick Cassidy. The start was delayed due to several vehicles stopping on the formation lap. One of these included the pole sitting car of Tomoki Nojiri and Takashi Kobayashi. The race was eventually started under safety car conditions. Wasting no time, Cassidy made a bold move down the inside of Kazuya Oshima, locking up both wheels in the process. Shortly thereafter, the #52 Saitama Toyopet Green Brave GT300 entry crashed, bringing out the safety car. After a round of pitstops, the #6 Lexus Team LeMans Wako's entry was catapulted into the lead. A long battle between Andrea Caldarelli and Ryō Hirakawa ensued, which ultimately saw the #37 Lexus Team KeePer Tom's entry emerge victorious.

In the GT300 category, Nobuteru Taniguchi and Tatsuya Kataoka took victory ahead of Haruki Kurosawa and Naoya Gamou, with both Mercedes maintaining the top two spots, albeit in reversed order.

GT500 entries

Pos	Class	No	Team	Driver	Vehicle	Laps	Time / Retired	Grid
1	GT500	37	Lexus Team KeePer Tom's	(Japan) Ryō Hirakawa (New Zealand) Nick Cassidy	Lexus LC 500	81	2hr 12min 39.626sec	3
2	GT500	6	Lexus Team LeMans Wako's	(Italy) Andrea Caldarelli (Japan) Kazuya Oshima	Lexus LC 500	81	+ 1.503 s	2
3	GT500	1	Lexus Team SARD	(Japan) Kohei Hirate (Finland) Heikki Kovalainen	Lexus LC 500	81	+ 2.761 s	9
4	GT500	38	Lexus Team ZENT Cerumo	(Japan) Hiroaki Ishiura (Japan) Yuji Tachikawa	Lexus LC 500	81	+ 2.939 s	4
5	GT500	36	Lexus Team au Tom's	(United Kingdom) James Rossiter (Japan) Kazuki Nakajima	Lexus LC 500	81	+ 7.607 s	8
6	GT500	19	Lexus Team WedsSport Bandoh	(Japan) Yuhi Sekiguchi (Japan) Yuji Kunimoto	Lexus LC 500	81	+ 9.219 s	6
7	GT500	23	NISMO	(Japan) Tsugio Matsuda (Italy) Ronnie Quintarelli	Nissan GT-R	81	+ 20.096 s	14
8	GT500	12	Team Impul	(Japan) Hironobu Yasuda (United Kingdom) Jann Mardenborough	Nissan GT-R	81	+ 32.360 s	13
9	GT500	16	Team Mugen	(Japan) Hideki Mutoh (Japan) Daisuke Nakajima	Honda NSX-GT	81	+ 40.195 s	7
10	GT500	24	Kondō Racing	(Japan) Daiki Sasaki (Brazil) João Paulo de Oliveira	Nissan GT-R	81	+ 51.691 s	11
11	GT300	4	Goodsmile Racing & TeamUKYO	(Japan) Nobuteru Taniguchi (Japan) Tatsuya Kataoka	Mercedes-AMG GT3	77	+ 4 laps	17
12	GT300	65	K2 R&D LEON Racing	(Japan) Haruki Kurosawa (Japan) Naoya Gamou	Mercedes-AMG GT3	77	+ 4 laps	16
13	GT300	9	Pacific with Gulf Racing	(New Zealand) Jono Lester (Japan) Kyosuke Mineo	Porsche 911 GT3-R	77	+ 4 laps	29
14	GT300	25	VivaC Team Tsuchiya	(Japan) Takamitsu Matsui (Japan) Kenta Yamashita	Toyota 86 MC	77	+ 4 laps	18
15	GT300	55	Autobacs Racing Team Aguri	(Japan) Shinichi Takagi (United Kingdom) Sean Walkinshaw	BMW M6 GT3	77	+ 4 laps	32
16	GT300	10	Gainer	(Japan) Ryuichiro Tomita (Japan) Hiroki Yoshida	Nissan GT-R GT3	77	+ 4 laps	24
17	GT300	3	NDDP Racing	(Japan) Kazuki Hoshino (racing driver) (Japan) Mitsunori Takaboshi	Nissan GT-R GT3	77	+ 4 laps	30
18	GT300	51	LM corsa	(Japan) Yuichi Nakayama (Japan) Sho Tsuboi	Lexus RC F GT3	77	+ 4 laps	19
19	GT300	33	D'station Racing	(Japan) Tomonobu Fujii (Germany) Sven Müller	Porsche 911 GT3-R	77	+ 4 laps	33
20	GT300	31	apr	(Japan) Koki Saga (Japan) Rintaro Kubo	Toyota Prius apr GT	77	+ 4 laps	11
21	GT300	87	JLOC	(Japan) Shinya Hosokawa (Japan) Kimiya Sato	Lamborghini Huracán GT3	77	+ 4 laps	22
22	GT300	18	Team Upgarage with Bandoh	(Japan) Yuhki Nakayama (Japan) Shintaro Kawabata	Toyota 86 MC	77	+ 4 laps	34
23	GT300	7	BMW Team Studie	(Germany) Jörg Müller (Japan) Seiji Ara	BMW M6 GT3	77	+ 4 laps	44
24	GT300	21	Audi Sport Team Hitotsuyama	(United Kingdom) Richard Lyons (Japan) Masataka Yanagida	Audi R8 LMS	76	+ 5 laps	26
25	GT300	360	Tomei Sports	(Japan) Yusaku Shibata (Japan) Takayuki Aoki	Nissan GT-R GT3	76	+ 5 laps	38
26	GT300	111	Rn-sports	(Japan) Keishi Ishikawa (Japan) Ryosei Yamashita	Mercedes-AMG GT3	76	+ 5 laps	35
27	GT300	5	Team Mach	(Japan) Natsu Sakaguchi (Japan) Kiyoto Fujinami	Toyota 86 MC	76	+ 5 laps	31
28	GT300	11	Gainer	(Japan) Katsuyuki Hiranaka (Sweden) Björn Wirdheim	Mercedes-AMG GT3	76	+ 5 laps	23
29	GT300	88	JLOC	(Japan) Manabu Orido (Japan) Kazuki Hiramine	Lamborghini Huracán GT3	76	+ 5 laps	20
30	GT300	117	EIcars Bentley TTO	(Japan) Yuji Ide (Japan) Ryohei Sakaguchi	Bentley Continental GT3	76	+ 5 laps	37
31	GT300	26	Team Taisan SARD	(Japan) Shinnosuke Yamada (Australia) Jake Parsons	Audi R8 LMS	75	+ 6 laps	39
32	GT300	60	LM corsa SARD	(Japan) Akira Iida (Japan) Hiroki Yoshimoto	Lexus RC F GT3	75	+ 6 laps	36
33	GT300	35	Panther Team Thailand	(Thailand) Nattavude Charoensukhawatana (Thailand) Nattapong Horthongkum	Toyota 86 MC	74	+ 7 laps	42
34	GT300	22	R'Qs Motor Sports	(Japan) Masaki Jyonai (Japan) Hisashi Wada	Mercedes-Benz SLS AMG GT3	74	+ 7 laps	40
35	GT300	48	Dijon Racing	(Japan) Masaki Tanaka (Japan) Hiroshi Takamori	Nissan GT-R GT3	74	+ 7 laps	41
36	GT500	17	Real Racing	(Japan) Koudai Tsukakoshi (Japan) Takashi Kogure	Honda NSX-GT	73	+ 8 laps	5
37	GT300	2	Cars Tokai Dream28	(Japan) Kazuho Takahashi (Japan) Hiroki Katoh	Lotus Evora MC	57	+ 24 laps	27
38	GT500	64	Nakajima Racing	(Japan) Kosuke Matsuura (Belgium) Bertrand Baguette	Honda NSX-GT	57	+ 24 laps	12
Ret	GT300	50	INGING Motorsport & Arnage Racing	(Japan) Akihiro Tsuzuki (Japan) Morio Nitta	Ferrari 488 GT3	49	Retired	25
Ret	GT300	30	apr	(Japan) Hiroaki Nagai (Japan) Kota Sasaki	Toyota Prius apr GT	42	Retired	28
Ret	GT300	61	R&D Sport	(Japan) Hideki Yamauchi (Japan) Takuto Iguchi	Subaru BRZ R&D Sport	36	Retired	21
Ret	GT500	100	Team Kunimitsu	(Japan) Naoki Yamamoto (Japan) Takuya Izawa	Honda NSX-GT	5	Retired	10
Ret	GT300	52	Saitama Toyopet Green Brave	(Japan) Taku Bamba (Japan) Shigekazu Wakisaka	Subaru BRZ R&D Sport	3	Retired	43
DNS	GT500	8	Autobacs Racing Team Aguri	(Japan) Tomoki Nojiri (Japan) Takashi Kobayashi	Honda NSX-GT		Did Not Start	

Preceded by 2016 Motegi GT 250km II	Super GT; 2017	Succeeded by 2017 Fuji GT 500km
