= Lexus LC =

Grand tourer produced by Lexus

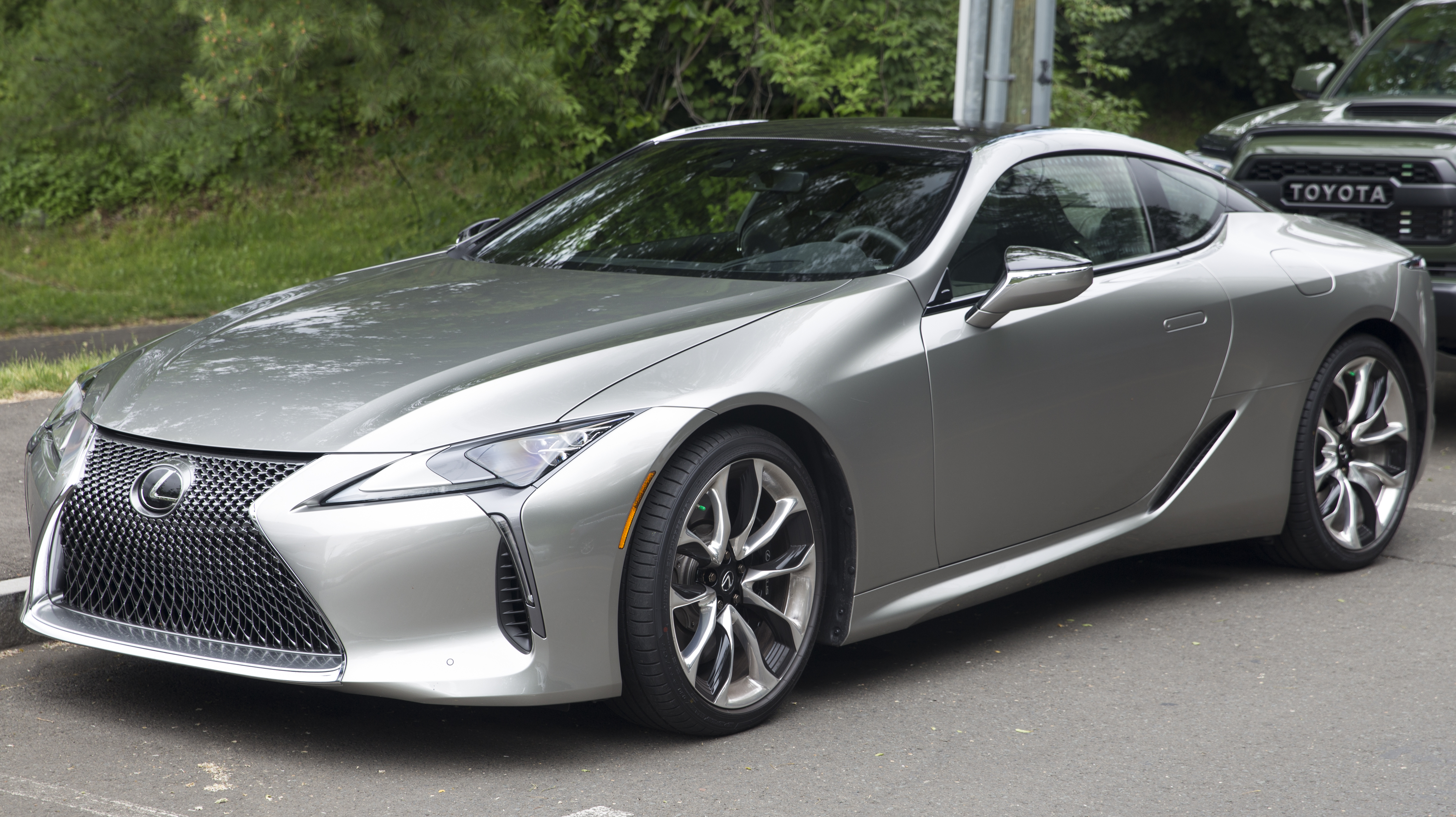
- Lexus LC 500 (URZ100)

Overview
- Manufacturer: Toyota
- Model code: Z100
- Production: March 2017 – August 2026
- Model years: 2018–2026
- Assembly: Japan: Toyota City (Motomachi plant)
- Designer: Edward Lee (LF-LC concept); Tadao Mori (chief designer); Pansoo Kwon (production exterior: 2013)

Body and chassis
- Class: Grand tourer (S)
- Body style: 2-door fastback coupé; 2-door convertible
- Layout: FMR layout
- Platform: TNGA: GA-L
- Related: Lexus LS (XF50)

Powertrain
- Engine: Petrol: 5.0 L 2UR-GSE V8 (LC 500; URZ100); Petrol hybrid: 3.5 L 8GR-FXS V6 (LC 500h; GWZ100)
- Electric motor: 132 kW (177 hp; 179 PS) 2NM AC synchronous (LC 500h)
- Power output: 351 kW (471 hp; 477 PS) (LC 500); 220 kW (295 hp; 299 PS) (LC 500h; petrol engine only); 264 kW (354 hp; 359 PS) (LC 500h; combined system output)
- Transmission: 10-speed Direct Shift Aisin AWR10L65 automatic (LC 500); 10-speed Multi Stage Hybrid System automatic (LC 500h)
- Hybrid drivetrain: Parallel hybrid (LC 500h)
- Battery: 310.8 V high-voltage Lithium-ion

Dimensions
- Wheelbase: 2,870 mm (113.0 in)
- Length: 4,760–4,770 mm (187.4–187.8 in)
- Width: 1,920 mm (75.6 in)
- Height: 1,345–1,350 mm (53.0–53.1 in)
- Curb weight: 1,931–2,055 kg (4,257–4,530 lb)

Chronology
- Predecessor: Lexus SC/Toyota Soarer

The Lexus LC (レクサス・LC, Rekusasu Eru Shī) is a grand tourer manufactured by Lexus, a luxury division of Toyota. Based on the 2012 LF-LC Concept, it was revealed at the 2016 North American International Auto Show in Detroit. It replaced the SC, which was produced from 1991 to 2010. The LC is the first Lexus model to utilize the GA-L platform, which, along with other components, is shared with the full-size XF50 series LS sedan. According to Lexus, the name "LC" stands for "Luxury Coupe".

== History ==
=== Development ===
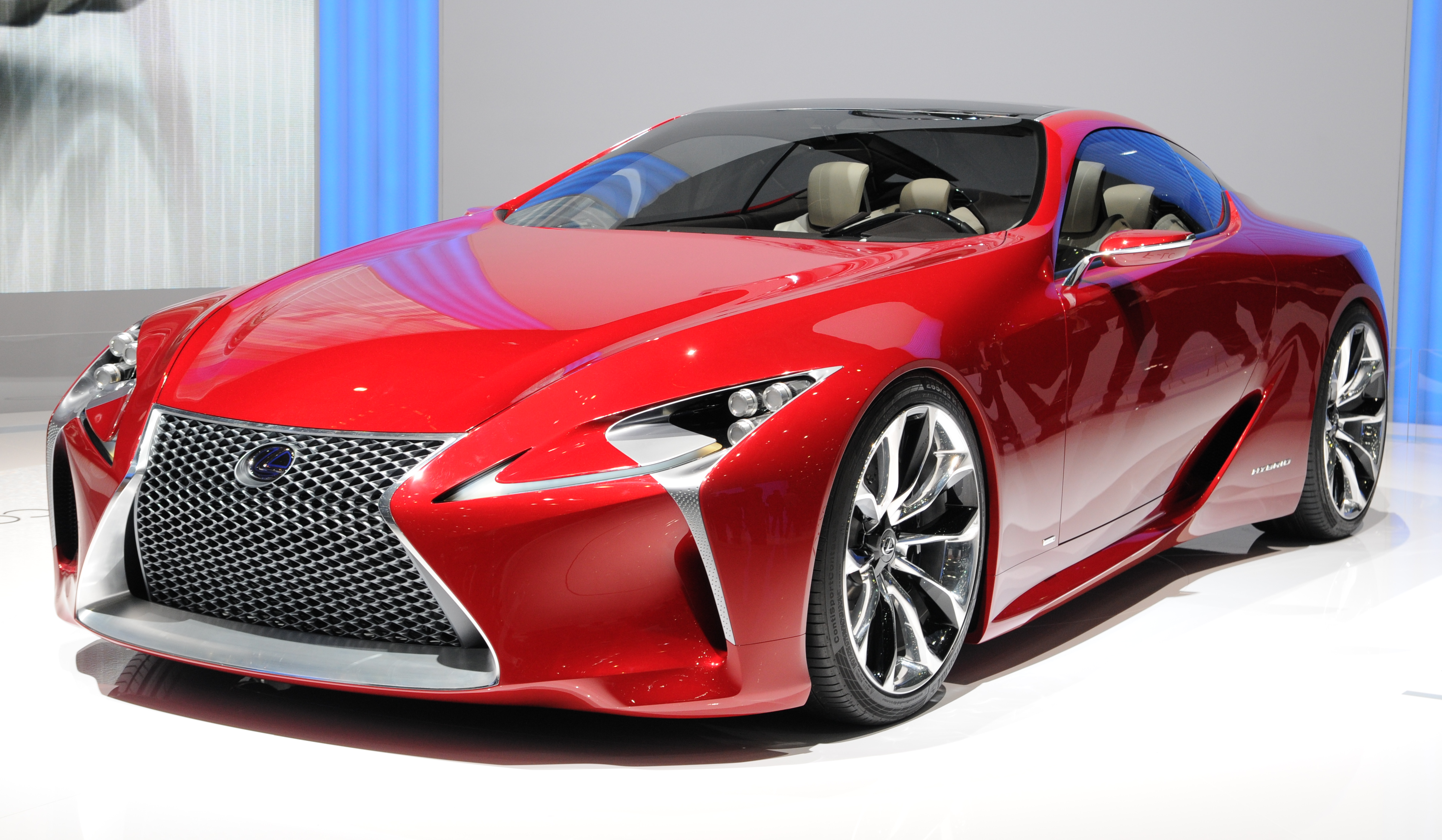
Lexus LF-LC concept

The LC was developed under the program codename "950A" from 2011 to 2016. It was previewed by the LF-LC Concept, which was designed at Calty Design Research in Newport Beach, California. The concept vehicle was revealed at the 2012 Detroit Auto Show. Design work was later transferred from Calty to Toyota Technical Centre in Aichi, Japan in January 2013, with a final production design freeze in the first half of 2014.

=== Introduction ===
Four years after the concept's debut, the production model, dubbed LC 500, was introduced in January 2016 at the same venue. It shares the same 5.0-litre 2UR-GSE V8 engine with the RC F and GS F with power slightly increased to 351 kW; 471 hp; 478 PS. It is paired with a 10-speed automatic transmission.

A hybrid-electric model, dubbed LC 500h, was revealed in Geneva in February 2016. It is powered by a 3.5-litre 8GR-FXS V6 engine, a hybrid transmission, and a lithium-ion battery pack with a combined 264 kW (354 hp; 359 PS) output at 6,600 rpm, and an estimated 500 N⋅m (370 lb⋅ft) of combined torque at 3000 rpm. The battery has 44 kW and 1.1 kWh and can power the car for 6 km (4 miles).

=== Discontinuation ===
Lexus announced that the production of the LC 500 coupe and convertible will end in August 2026, and 2026 will be the final model year for the North American market.

=== Manufacturing ===
The LC is built at Toyota's Motomachi facility, the same plant that produced the LFA. The factory was reconfigured for LC production, which included finishing the entire facility's interior in white. Many of the "Takumi" master craftsmen who built the LFA continue their work on different areas of the LC, including carbon fibre parts, leatherwork and paint. Series production commenced in March 2017, with the first example completed on April 23, 2017.

=== Concept cars ===
The LC Convertible Concept is based on the LC. It has 22-inch wheels and white leather trim with gold accent stitching. Tadao Mori was the Chief Designer. It weighed more than the LC coupé, therefore the top speed and acceleration times dropped slightly.

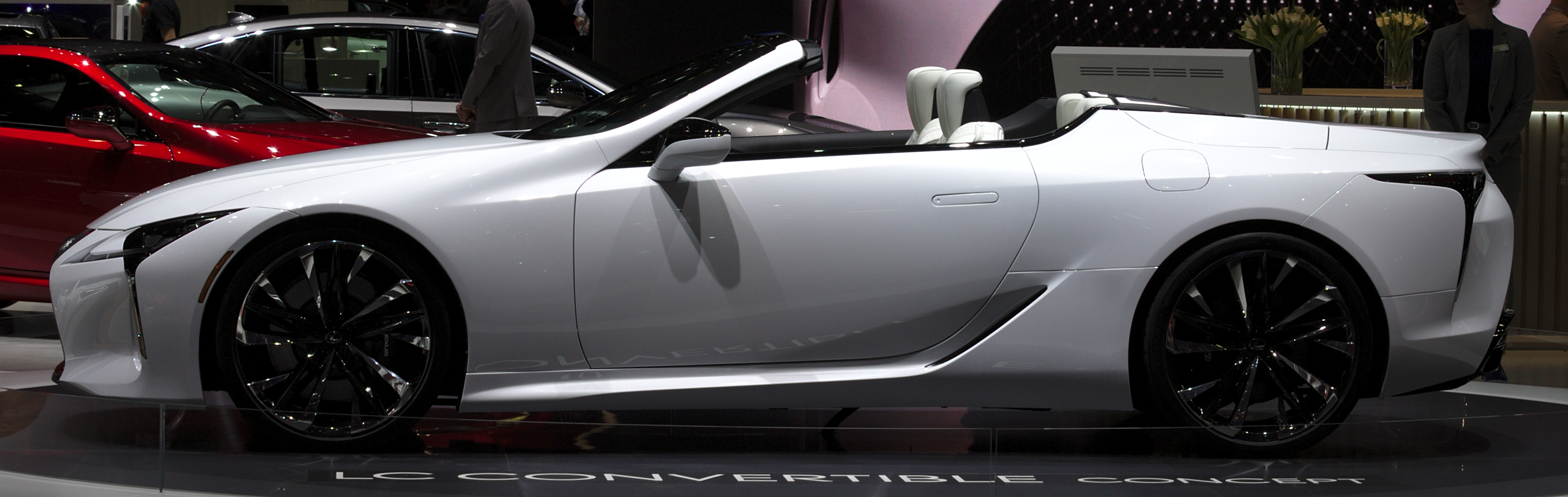
LC Convertible Concept at 2019 Geneva Motor Show

=== Convertible ===
The LC 500 Convertible, based on the concept car, was unveiled at the LA Auto Show on November 20, 2019. Its four-layer soft top roof can be operated at speeds of up to 50 km/h (30 mph). Its features include a transparent polycarbonate wind deflector, neck heaters, and Active Noise Control (ANC) technology.

== Design ==
The LC retained the overall design of the concept model. It has a variant of Lexus' corporate "spindle" grille with a gradient pattern; a tightly compressed mesh at the top transitions to a wider diamond at the bottom. However, unlike other vehicles in the lineup, the top of the spindle grille does not have a chrome surround. The compact LED triple-projector headlight is in the small overhang between the bumper and wheels.

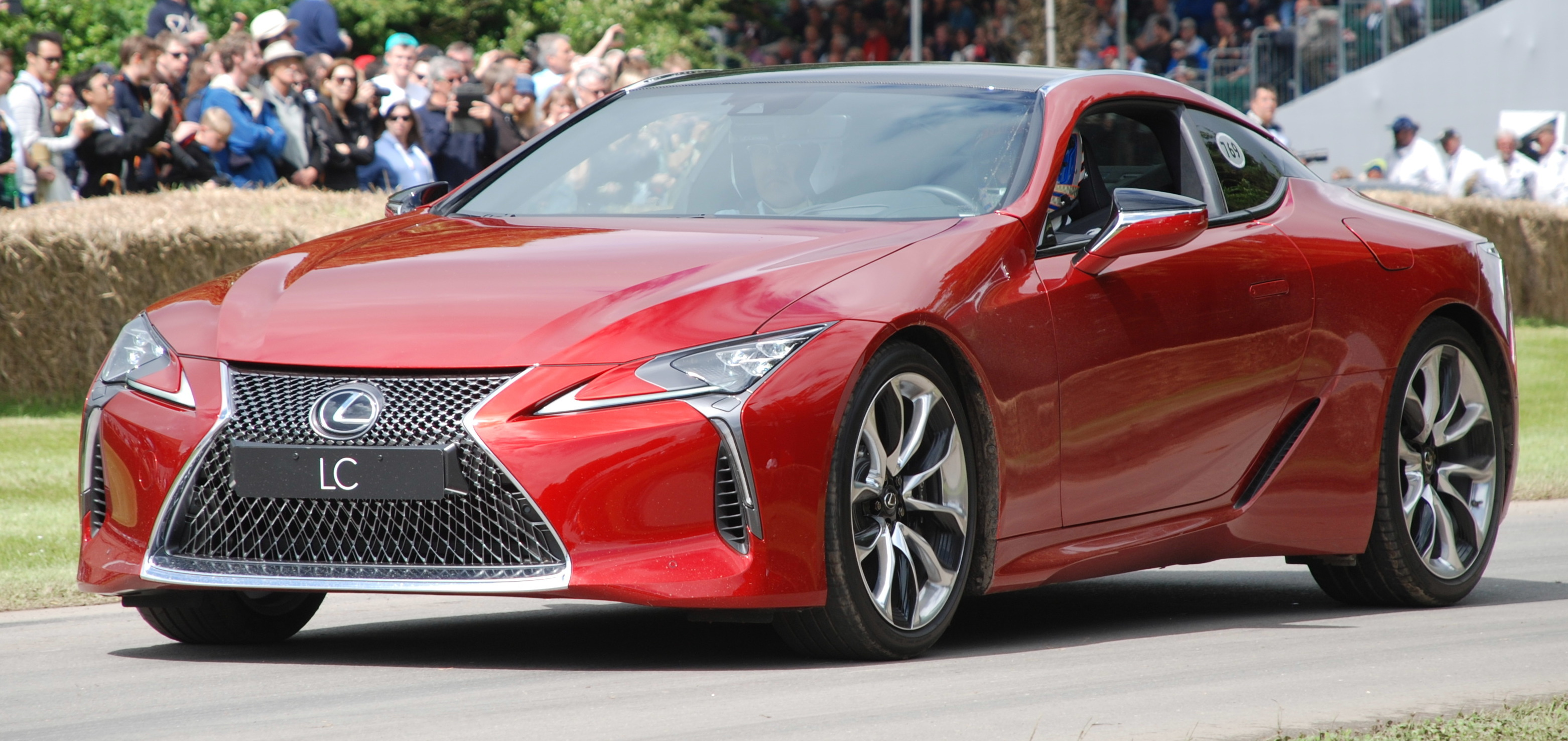
LC 500 (URZ100)

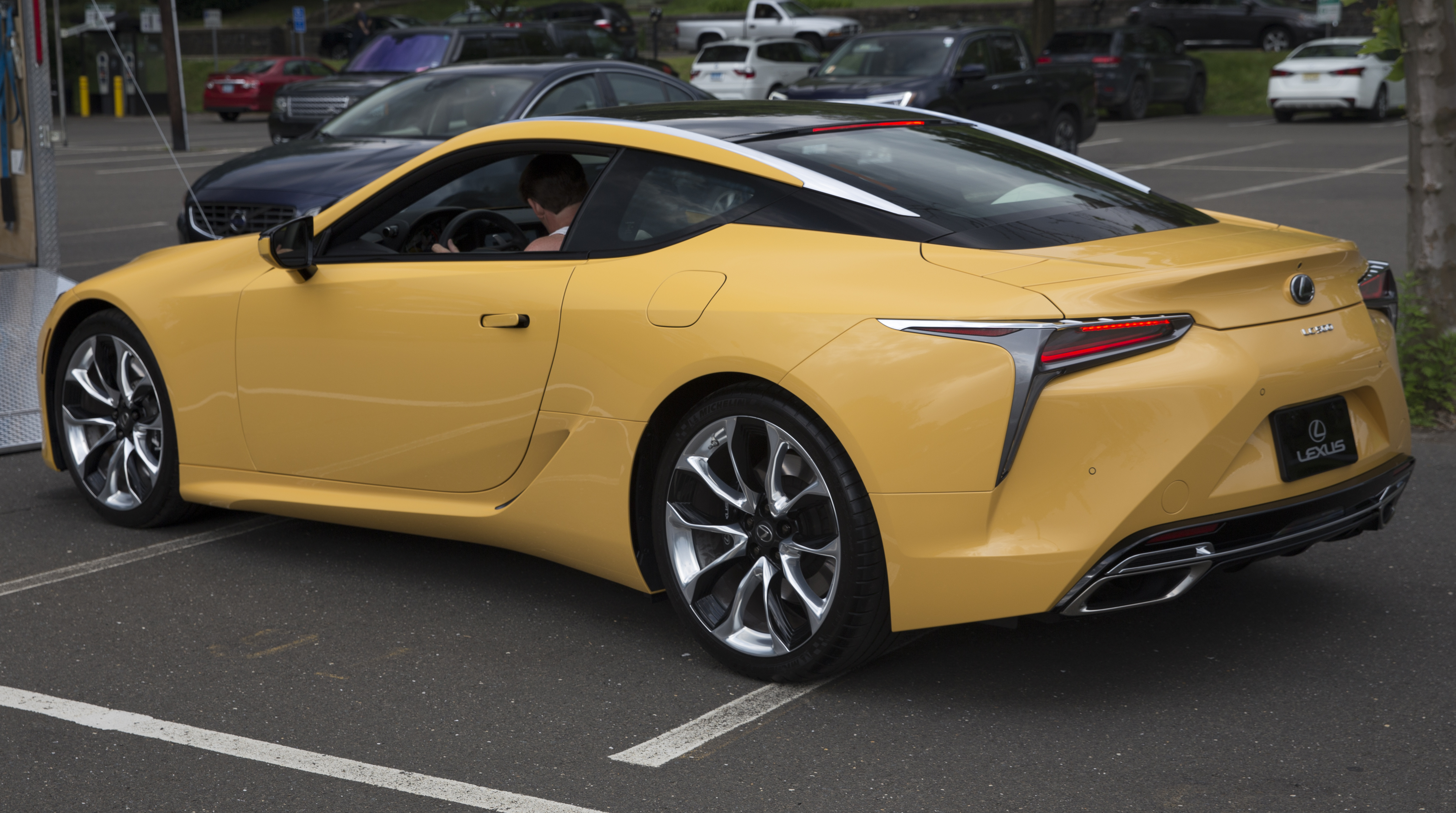
LC 500 (URZ100)

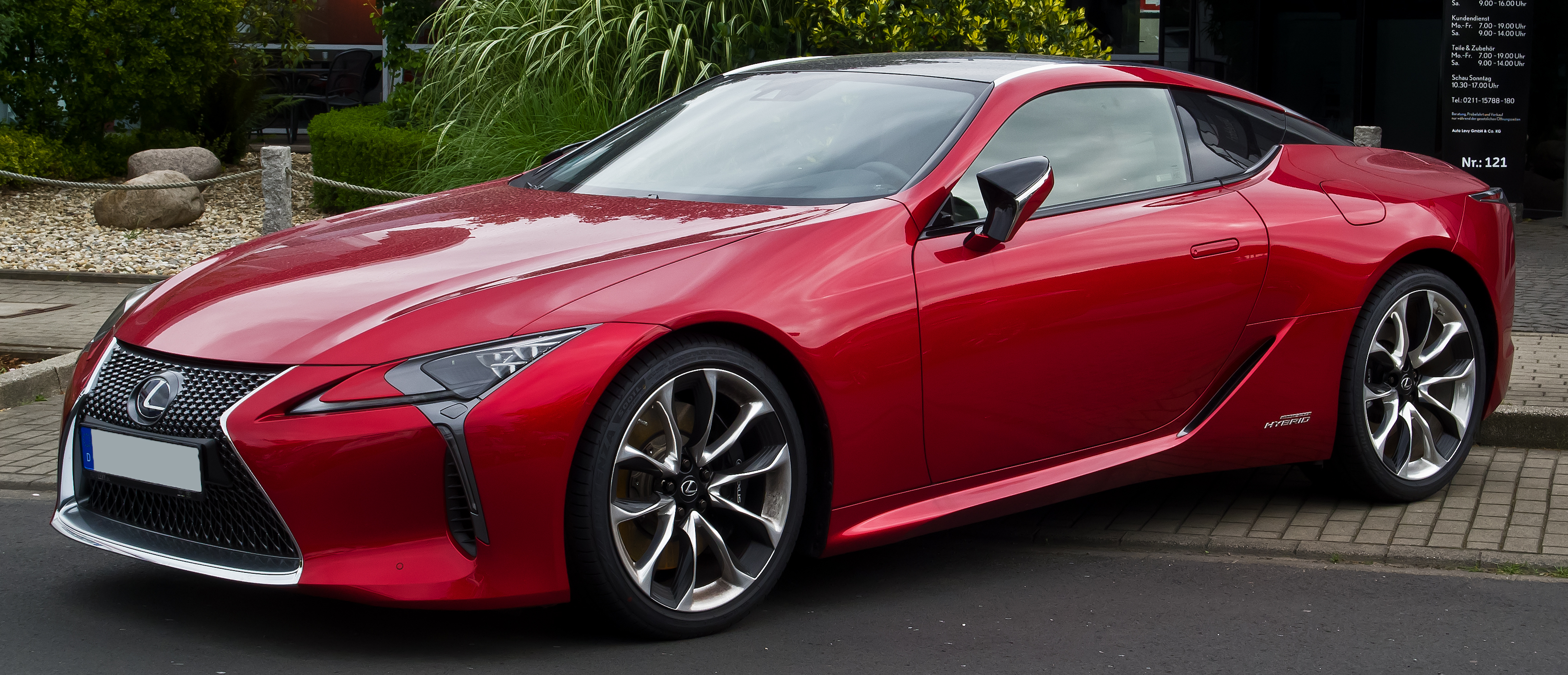
LC 500h (GWZ100)

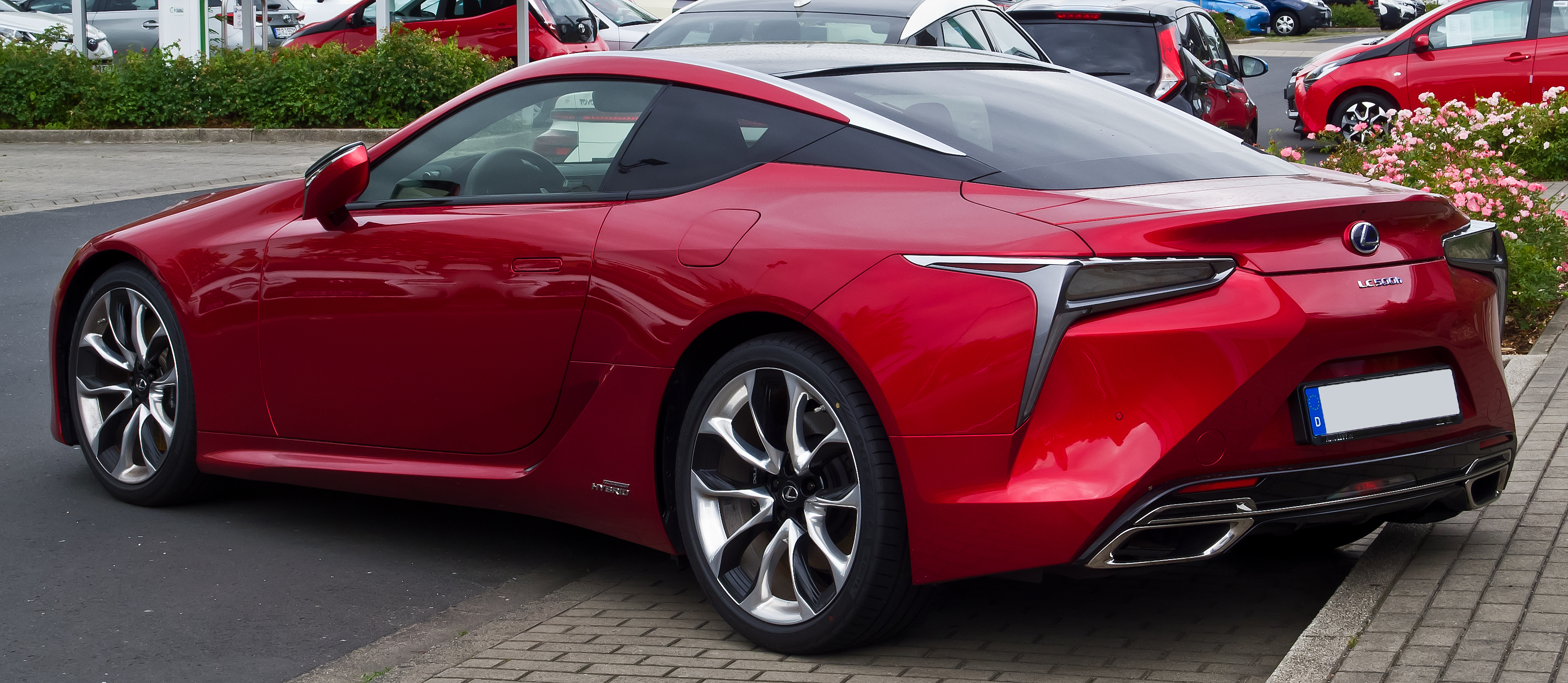
LC 500h (GWZ100)

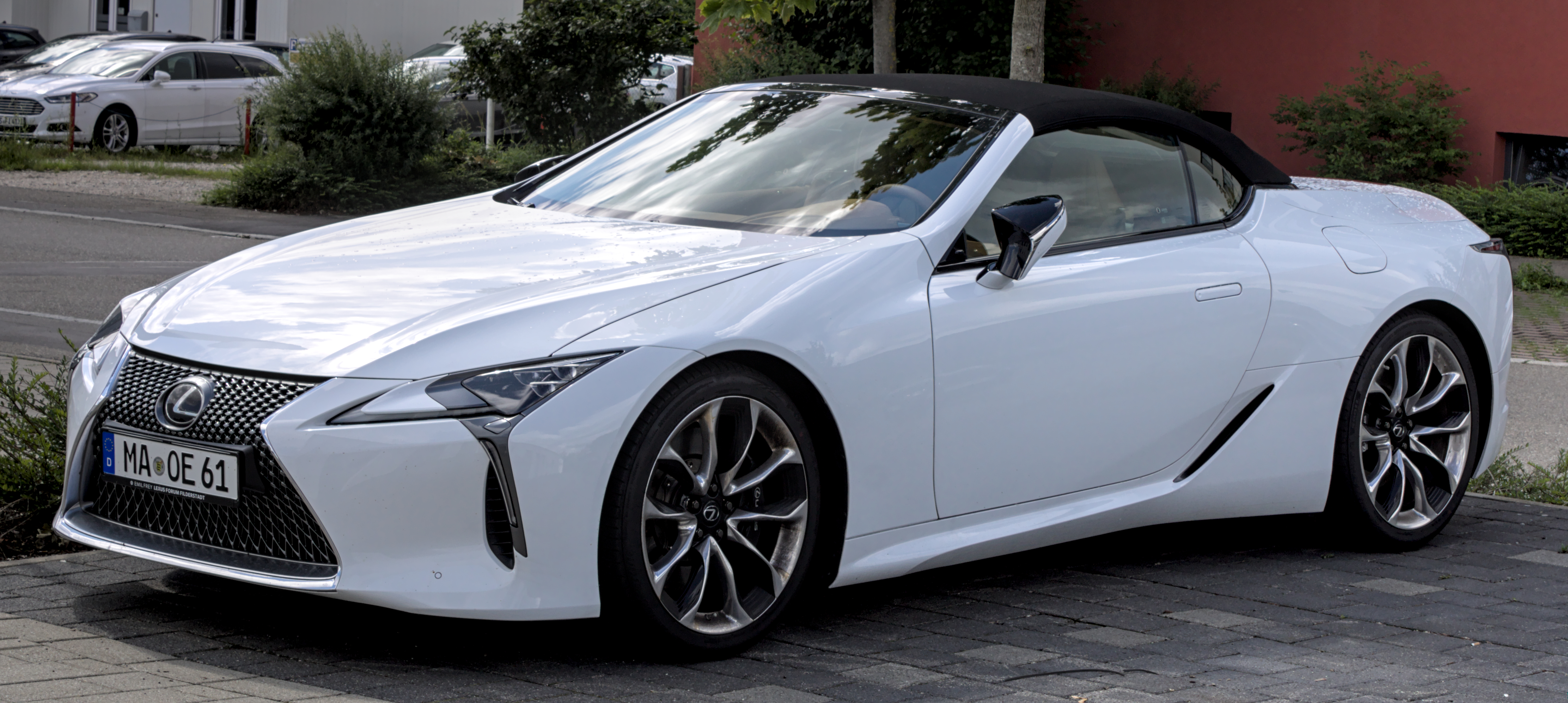
LC 500 Convertible (URZ100)

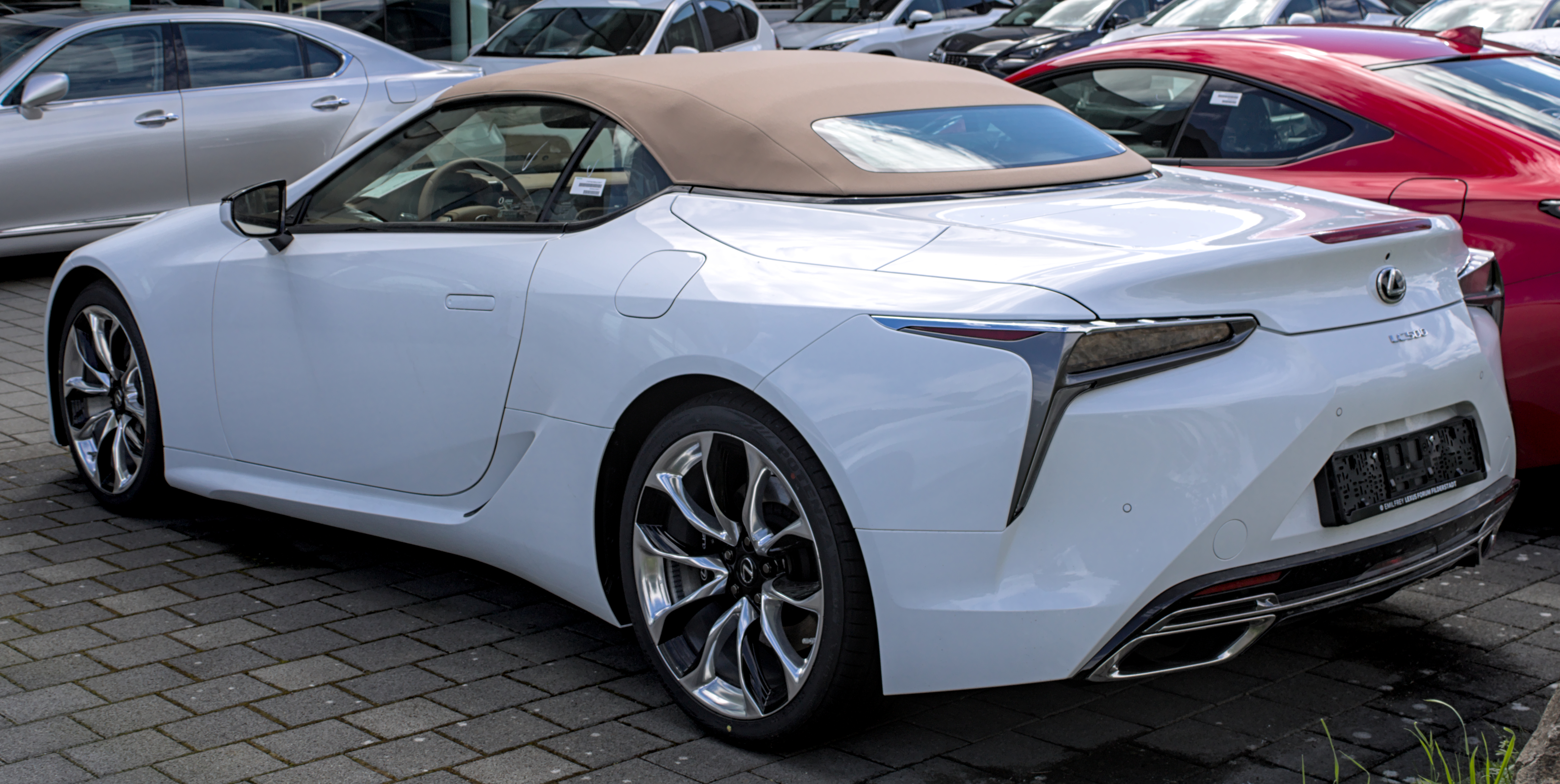
LC 500 Convertible (URZ100)

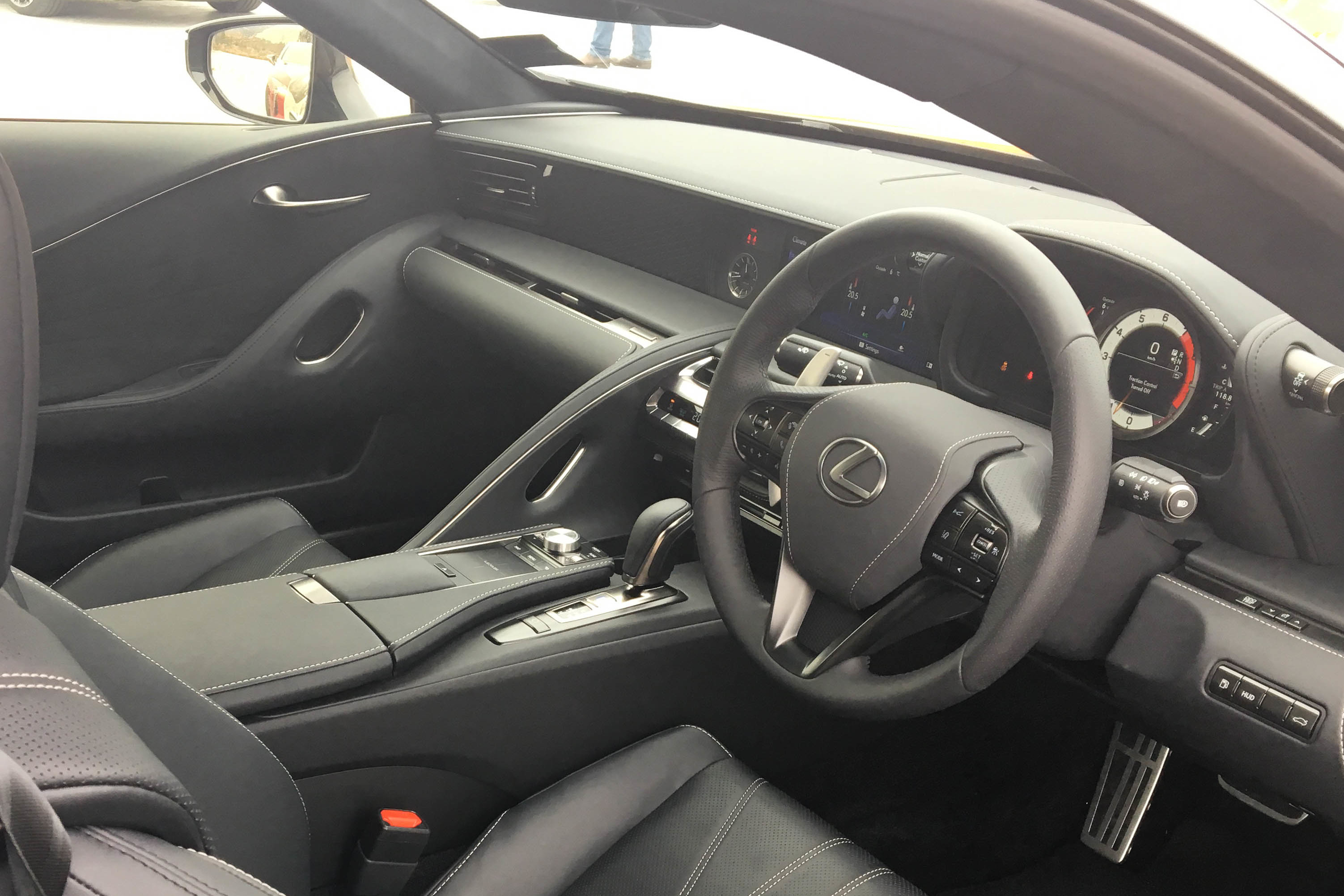
Interior

=== Chassis ===
The LC is the first vehicle to use Lexus' front-engine, rear-wheel drive platform, dubbed "Global Architecture – Luxury" (GA-L). It consists of various materials, including high-strength steel, aluminium, and carbon fibre. The GA-L platform would underpin future rear-wheel drive models, including the LS 500, which was introduced in January 2017. The platform is designed to provide lower overall mass, improved front/rear weight distribution, and a low center of gravity. Run-flat tires are also used to avoid the need for a spare, and the vehicle battery has been relocated to the trunk to improve weight distribution.

The suspension is a double-joint multi-link suspension with a forged aluminium upper arm is secured at two points, which ensures all movements are mirrored from the lower arm. The double-joint design reduces the necessary height of the suspension system, as placement is lower than a traditional single-joint setup.

=== Powertrain ===
==== LC 500 ====
The LC 500 is powered by a 2UR-GSE 5.0-litre V8 engine which is an updated version of the engine found in the RC F, GS F and other F cars alike. It uses D-4S direct and port fuel injection, Atkinson cycle operation and VVT-i. The engine produces 351 kW (471 hp; 477 PS) at 7,100 rpm and 540 N⋅m (398 lbf⋅ft) of torque at 4,800 rpm and is mated to a 10-speed Direct Shift automatic transmission.

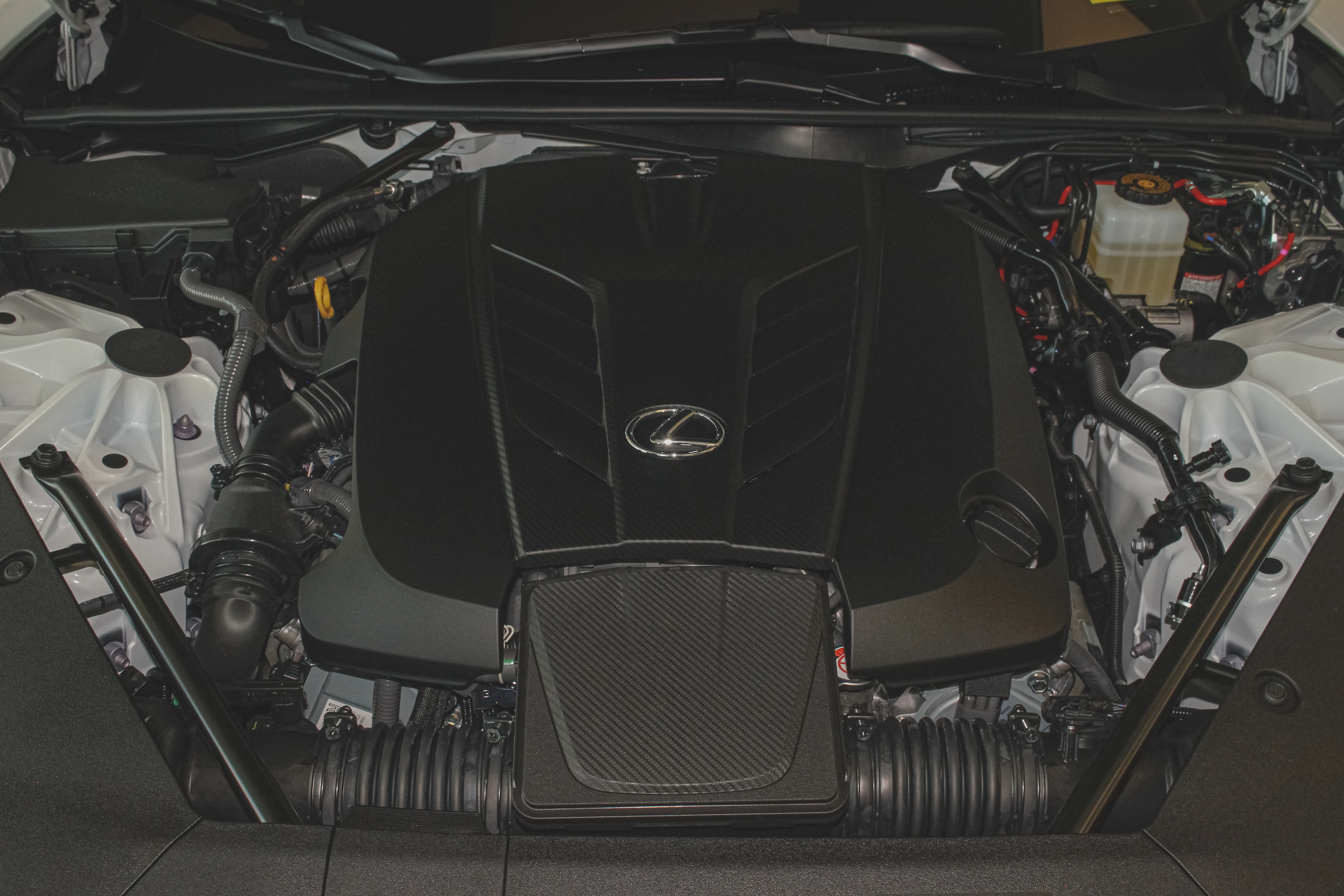
LC 500 Motor (2UR-GSE)

Lexus claimed that the LC 500 can hit 0–97 km/h (0–60 mph) in 4.4 seconds.

==== LC 500h ====
The LC 500h employs a hybrid powertrain, known as the Lexus Multi Stage Hybrid system. It consists of a 3.5-litre 8GR-FXS V6 engine which produces 220 kW (295 hp; 299 PS) at 6,600 rpm and 356 N⋅m (263 lb⋅ft) of torque at 5,100 rpm, in addition to two electric motors whose total output is 132 kW (177 hp; 179 PS) and 300 N⋅m (220 lb⋅ft) of torque. Combined power output over the entire system is 264 kW (354 hp; 359 PS) and 500 N⋅m (369 lbf⋅ft) of torque.

The engine and motors are coupled to a unique transmission, which consists of a four-speed automatic transmission embedded inside a continuously variable transmission. This “dual” transmission provides stepped access to the torque generated by the electric motor, and functions similarly to a 10-speed automatic transmission.

== Motorsport ==
=== Super GT ===
Lexus LC 500 GT500
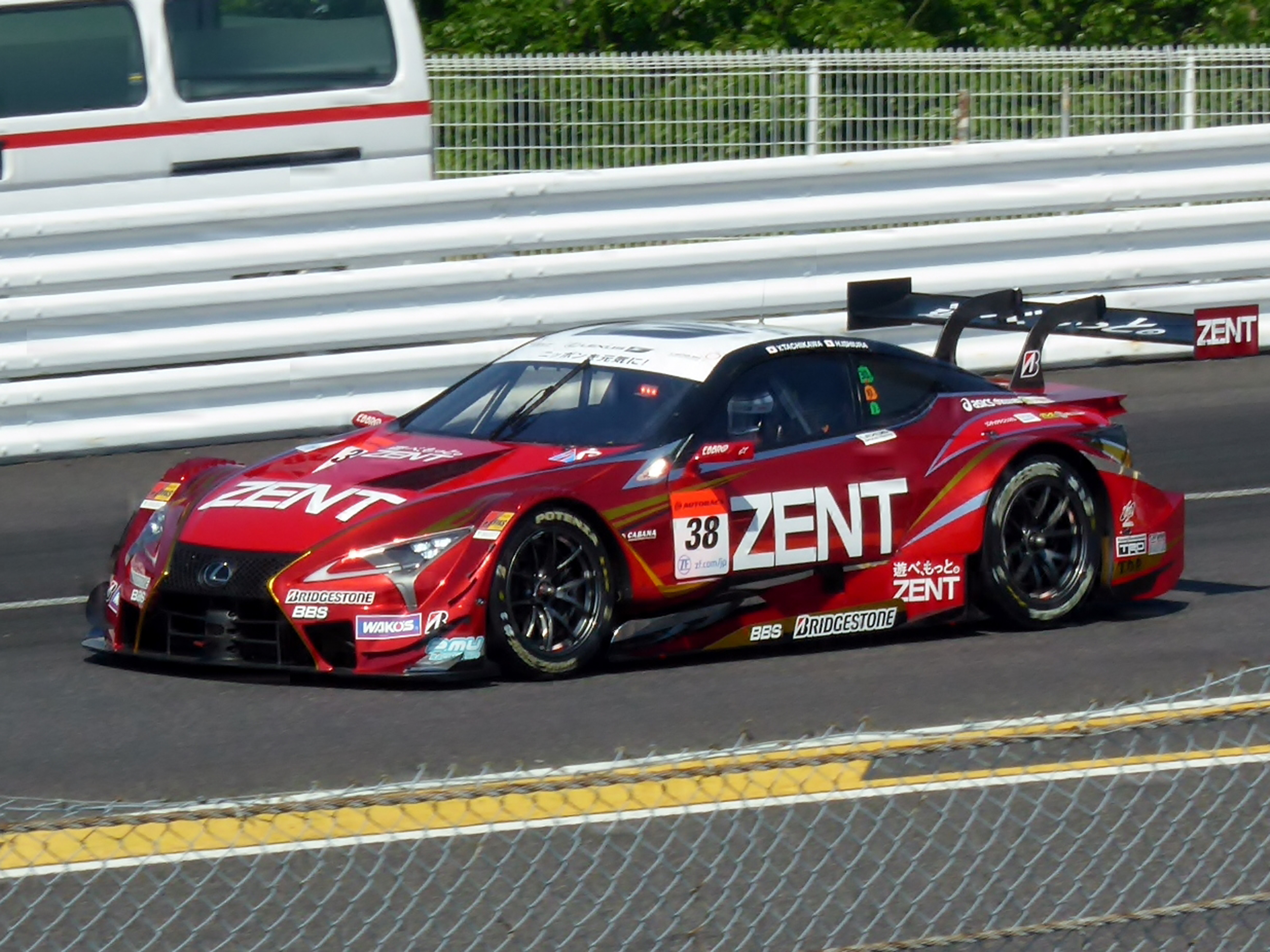
- Category: Super GT GT500
- Constructor: Lexus
- Predecessor: Lexus RC F GT500
- Successor: Toyota GR Supra GT500 (GT500 only)

Technical specifications
- Chassis: Carbon-fibre monocoque
- Suspension (front): Double wishbone, pushrod operated, twin dampers and torsion bars
- Suspension (rear): Double wishbone, pushrod operated, twin dampers and spring
- Length: 4,960 mm (195.3 in)
- Width: 1,950 mm (76.8 in)
- Height: 1,220 mm (48.0 in)
- Wheelbase: 2,750 mm (108.3 in)
- Engine: Lexus RI4AG 2,000 cc (122 cu in) inline-4 single-turbocharged, front-mid-mounted
- Transmission: 6-speed sequential semi-automatic gearbox
- Power: 483 kW (657 PS; 648 hp)
- Weight: 1,020 kg (2,249 lb)
- Fuel: Various
- Lubricants: Various
- Brakes: Hydraulic ventilated carbon disk. AP Racing calipers
- Tyres: Bridgestone Potenza and Yokohama Advan

Competition history
- Notable entrants: (Japan) Lexus Team SARD (Japan) Lexus Team LeMans Wako's (Japan) Lexus Team WedsSport Bandoh (Japan) Lexus Team TOM'S (Japan) Lexus Team ZENT-Cerumo
- Notable drivers: (Japan) Kohei Hirate (Finland) Heikki Kovalainen (Italy) Andrea Caldarelli (Japan) Kazuya Oshima (Japan) Yuhi Sekiguchi (Japan) Yuji Kunimoto (Japan) Kamui Kobayashi (Japan) Kazuki Nakajima (Japan) Daisuke Itō (United Kingdom) James Rossiter (Japan) Ryo Hirakawa (New Zealand) Nick Cassidy (Japan) Hiroaki Ishiura (Japan) Yuji Tachikawa
- Debut: 2017 Okayama GT 300km
- Last event: 2019 Motegi GT 250km
Races	Wins	Poles	F/Laps
24	14	7	6
- Constructors' Championships: 2
- Drivers' Championships: 2

==== GT500 ====
The LC500 GT500 is a GT500 GT race car derived from the road-going LC500 for use in the Super GT from 2017 onwards. The car is the direct replacement to the Lexus RC F GT500, which competed in the 2014 to 2016 Super GT seasons. The LC500 GT500 car made its début at the 2017 Okayama GT 300km, and claimed 14 race wins of the 24 overall entered races from 2017 until 2019 (26 with the Super GT/DTM crossover events). In 2020, with the introduction of the new Class One and the revival of the Supra nameplate, the Toyota GR Supra would take its place in the GT500 category.

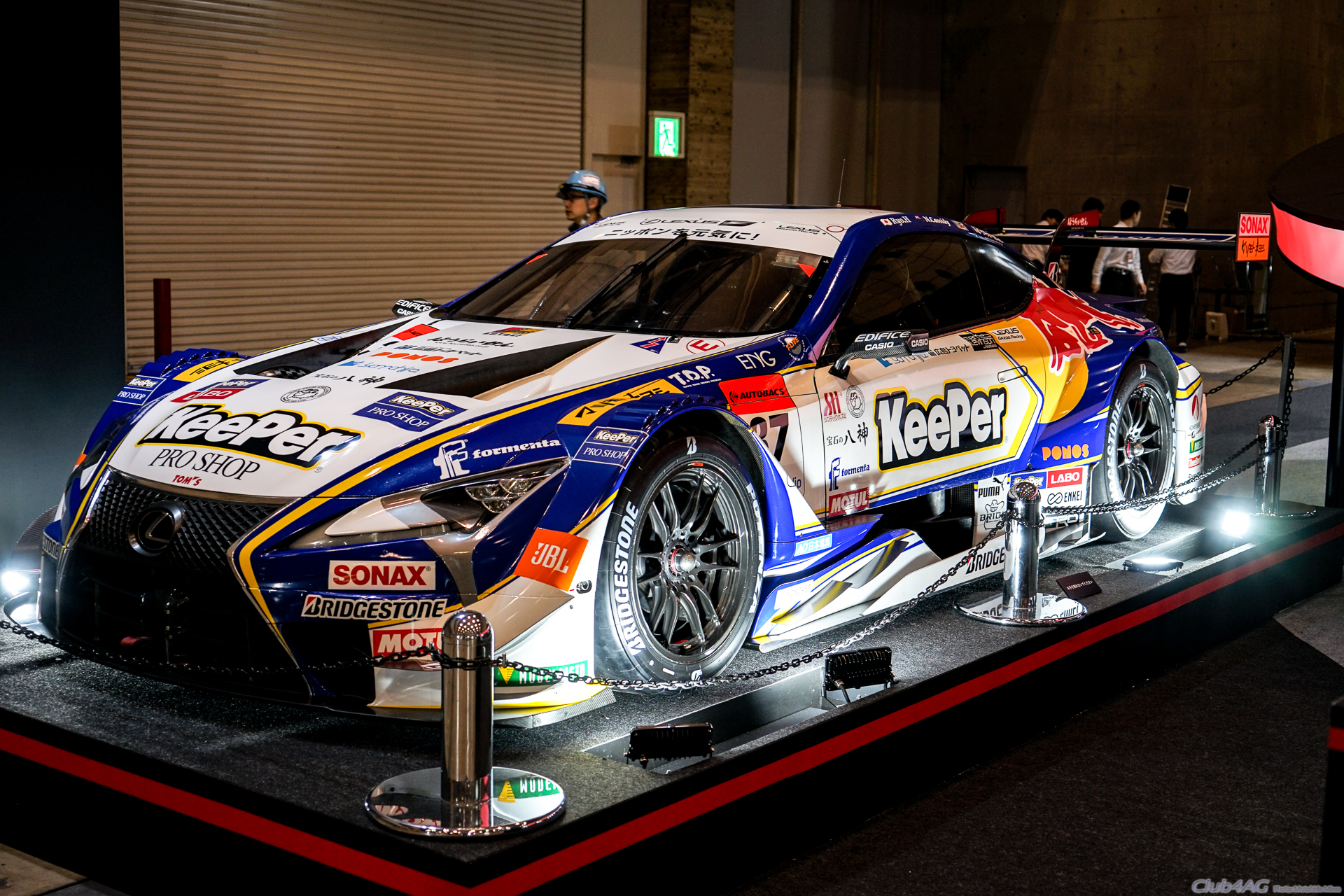
2017 winner of Keeper TOM'S LC500

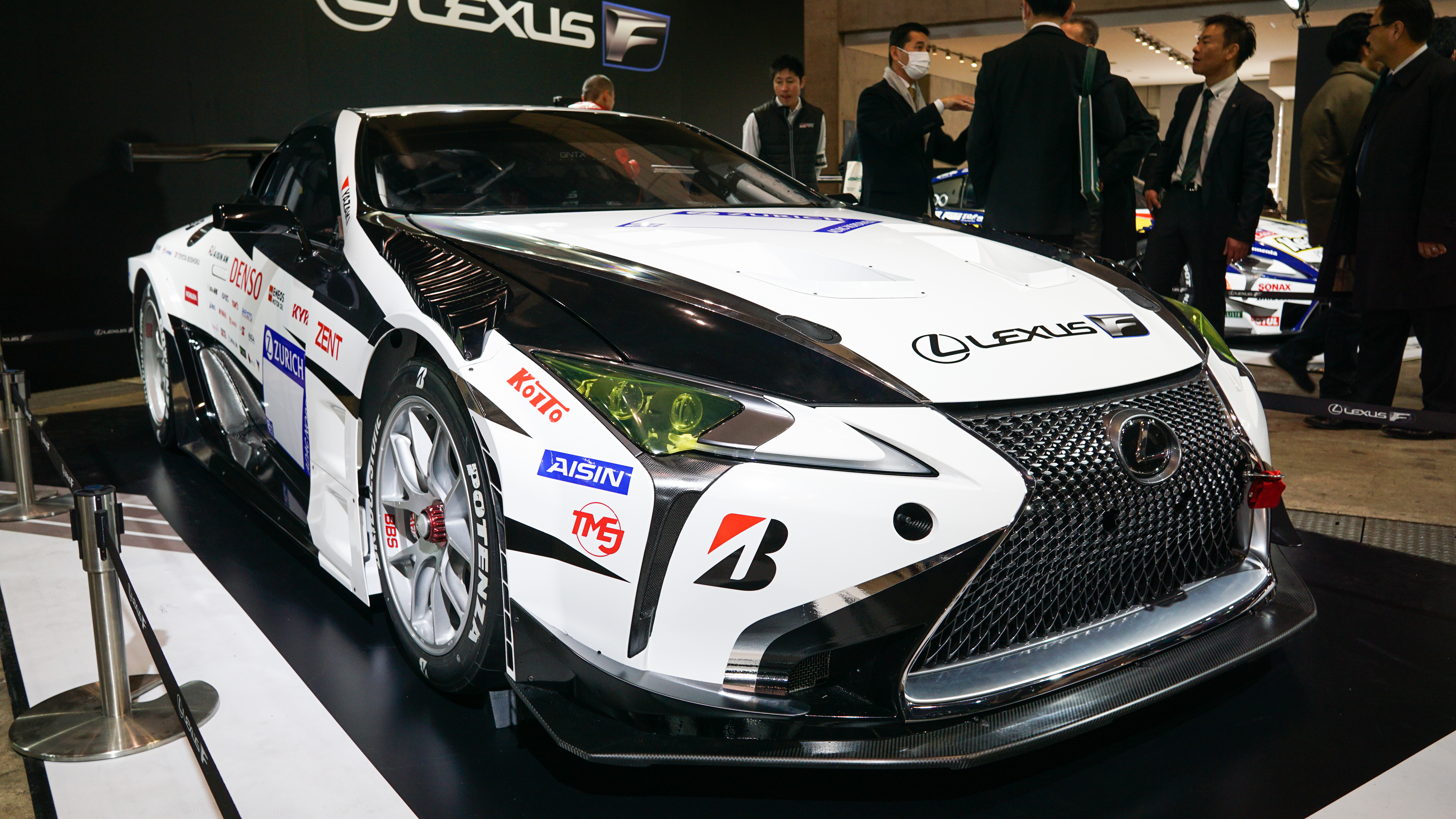
Lexus LC SP-PRO at the 2018 24 Hours of Nürburgring

==== GT300 ====
For 2023, a GT300 version of the LC500h, called the LC500h GT, was developed by APR as a replacement for their Toyota Prius GT300. The car features the same hybrid system as the Prius before it.

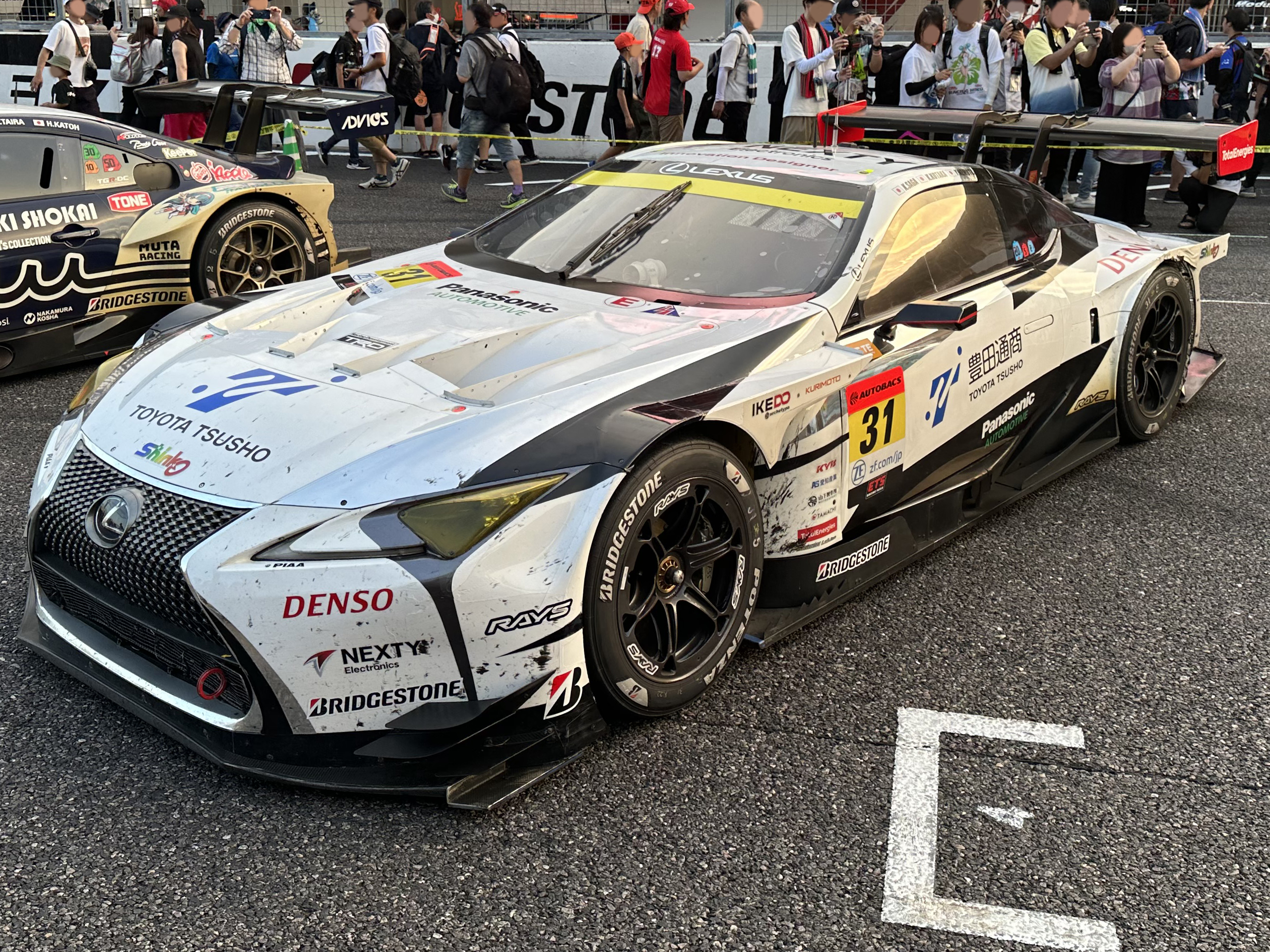
Lexus LC500h GT300 at the 2023 Suzuka GT 450 km

== Marketing ==
For Marvel Studios' Black Panther feature film, Lexus provided LC500s for filming in South Korea during the car chase sequence. Lexus also produced two specific LC models named Black Panther Editions that feature a large Black Panther mask decal on the hood, blue underbody lighting, 24-inch wheels and blue paint with subtle striping.

== Sales ==
Calendar year	Europe	US	China
2017	548	2,484	
2018	810	1,979	
2019	361	1,219	
2020	260	1,324	
2021	369	2,782	
2022	262	1,387	
2023		1,761	69
2024		1,464	24
2025		1,286	25

European statistics include sales from the following countries: Austria, Belgium, Bulgaria, Cyprus, Czech Republic, Denmark, Estonia, Finland, France, Germany, Great Britain, Greece, Hungary, Iceland, Ireland, Italy, Latvia, Lithuania, Luxembourg, Netherlands, Norway, Poland, Portugal, Romania, Slovakia, Slovenia, Spain, Sweden, and Switzerland.
