= 2003 All Japan Grand Touring Car Championship =

Motorsports season

The 2003 All Japan Grand Touring Car Championship was the eleventh season of Japan Automobile Federation GT premiere racing. It was marked as well as the twenty-first season of a JAF-sanctioned sports car racing championship dating back to the All Japan Sports Prototype Championship. The GT500 class champions of 2003 were the #23 Xanavi NISMO Nissan Skyline GT-R team driven by Satoshi Motoyama and Michael Krumm and the GT300 class champions were the #3 Hasemi Motorsports Nissan Fairlady Z driven by Masataka Yanagida and Mitsuhiro Kinoshita, neither of which had won a single race during the course of the season.

The 2003 season saw the introduction of a comprehensive overhaul of the series' vehicle regulations. Manufacturers could now cut away the production vehicle's mainframe and replace the front and rear structures with pipe frame structures, which had also allowed for further suspension development. The engine could now be mounted freely in any position or any orientation, and the transmission could now be mounted freely in any position, allowing for the introduction of transaxle units. The size of the rear diffuser was reduced, and the underbody of the car had to be fitted with a flat bottom floor.

Toyota had fitted their GT500 Supra with a 5.2 litre version of the naturally-aspirated 3UZ-FE V8 engine to replace the four-cylinder 3S-GTE. Honda retained the 3.5 litre C32B V6 engine, which was now mounted longitudinally behind the cockpit. Nissan changed from the RB26DETT inline-six cylinder engine to the VQ30DETT V6 engine in the middle of 2002, and retained the lighter aluminium-block engine into 2003.

== Drivers and teams ==
=== GT500 ===
Team	Make	Car	Engine	No.	Drivers	Tyre	Rounds
Esso Toyota Team LeMans	Toyota	Toyota Supra	Toyota 3UZ-FE 5.2 L V8	1	(Japan) Akira Iida	B	All
Esso Toyota Team LeMans	Toyota	Toyota Supra	Toyota 3UZ-FE 5.2 L V8	1	(Japan) Juichi Wakisaka	B	All
Autobacs Racing Team Aguri	Honda	Honda NSX	Honda C32B 3.5 L V6	8	(Japan) Keiichi Tsuchiya	B	All
Autobacs Racing Team Aguri	Honda	Honda NSX	Honda C32B 3.5 L V6	8	(Japan) Toshihiro Kaneishi	B	1–3, 5–8
Autobacs Racing Team Aguri	Honda	Honda NSX	Honda C32B 3.5 L V6	8	(Japan) Katsutomo Kaneishi	B	4
Calsonic Team Impul	Nissan	Nissan Skyline GT-R	Nissan VQ30DETT 3.0 L Twin Turbo V6	12	(Japan) Yuji Ide	B	All
Calsonic Team Impul	Nissan	Nissan Skyline GT-R	Nissan VQ30DETT 3.0 L Twin Turbo V6	12	(France) Benoît Tréluyer	B	All
G'Zox Mugen; G'Zox Dome Racing Team	Honda	Honda NSX	Honda C32B 3.5 L V6	16	(Netherlands) Tom Coronel	B	All
G'Zox Mugen; G'Zox Dome Racing Team	Honda	Honda NSX	Honda C32B 3.5 L V6	16	(Japan) Daisuke Ito	B	All
Takata Dome Racing Team	Honda	Honda NSX	Honda C32B 3.5 L V6	18	(Japan) Ryō Michigami	B	All
Takata Dome Racing Team	Honda	Honda NSX	Honda C32B 3.5 L V6	18	(France) Sébastien Philippe	B	1–6, 8
Takata Dome Racing Team	Honda	Honda NSX	Honda C32B 3.5 L V6	18	(Italy) Paolo Montin	B	7
Nismo	Nissan	Nissan Skyline GT-R	Nissan VQ30DETT 3.0 L Twin Turbo V6	22	(Japan) Masami Kageyama	B	All
Nismo	Nissan	Nissan Skyline GT-R	Nissan VQ30DETT 3.0 L Twin Turbo V6	22	(United Kingdom) Richard Lyons	B	All
Nismo	Nissan	Nissan Skyline GT-R	Nissan VQ30DETT 3.0 L Twin Turbo V6	23	(Germany) Michael Krumm	B	All
Nismo	Nissan	Nissan Skyline GT-R	Nissan VQ30DETT 3.0 L Twin Turbo V6	23	(Japan) Satoshi Motoyama	B	All
Team Advan Tsuchiya	Toyota	Toyota Supra	Toyota 3UZ-FE 5.2 L V8	25	(France) Jérémie Dufour	Y	All
Team Advan Tsuchiya	Toyota	Toyota Supra	Toyota 3UZ-FE 5.2 L V8	25	(Japan) Seiji Ara	Y	1, 3–8
Team Advan Tsuchiya	Toyota	Toyota Supra	Toyota 3UZ-FE 5.2 L V8	25	(Japan) Hideki Noda	Y	2
Project Mu Kraft	Toyota	Toyota Supra	Toyota 3UZ-FE 5.2 L V8	35	(Japan) Naoki Hattori	D	All
Project Mu Kraft	Toyota	Toyota Supra	Toyota 3UZ-FE 5.2 L V8	35	(Japan) Shigekazu Wakisaka	D	All
Toyota Team TOM'S	Toyota	Toyota Supra	Toyota 3UZ-FE 5.2 L V8	36	(France) Érik Comas	M	All
Toyota Team TOM'S	Toyota	Toyota Supra	Toyota 3UZ-FE 5.2 L V8	36	(Japan) Takeshi Tsuchiya	M	All
Toyota Team TOM'S	Toyota	Toyota Supra	Toyota 3UZ-FE 5.2 L V8	37	(Italy) Marco Apicella	M	All
Toyota Team TOM'S	Toyota	Toyota Supra	Toyota 3UZ-FE 5.2 L V8	37	(Japan) Takuya Kurosawa	M	All
au Toyota Team Cerumo	Toyota	Toyota Supra	Toyota 3UZ-FE 5.2 L V8	38	(Japan) Yuji Tachikawa	B	All
au Toyota Team Cerumo	Toyota	Toyota Supra	Toyota 3UZ-FE 5.2 L V8	38	(Japan) Hironori Takeuchi	B	All
Denso Toyota Team SARD	Toyota	Toyota Supra	Toyota 3UZ-FE 5.2 L V8	39	(Japan) Manabu Orido	Y	All
Denso Toyota Team SARD	Toyota	Toyota Supra	Toyota 3UZ-FE 5.2 L V8	39	(Germany) Dominik Schwager	Y	All
R&D Sport	Vemac	Vemac RD350R	Zytek ZV348 3.4 L V8	62	(Japan) Shogo Mitsuyama	D	2–6, 8
R&D Sport	Vemac	Vemac RD350R	Zytek ZV348 3.4 L V8	62	(Japan) Shinsuke Shibahara	D	2–6, 8
Mobil 1 Nakajima Racing	Honda	Honda NSX	Honda C32B 3.5 L V6	64	(Japan) Tsugio Matsuda	B	All
Mobil 1 Nakajima Racing	Honda	Honda NSX	Honda C32B 3.5 L V6	64	(Japan) Takashi Kogure	B	1–3
Mobil 1 Nakajima Racing	Honda	Honda NSX	Honda C32B 3.5 L V6	64	(Germany) André Lotterer	B	4–8
Hitotsuyama Racing	McLaren	McLaren F1 GTR	BMW S70/2 6.0 L V12	76	(Japan) Eiichi Tajima	D	All
Hitotsuyama Racing	McLaren	McLaren F1 GTR	BMW S70/2 6.0 L V12	76	(Japan) Yudai Igarashi	D	1–3
Hitotsuyama Racing	McLaren	McLaren F1 GTR	BMW S70/2 6.0 L V12	76	(Japan) Haruki Kurosawa	D	4–5
Hitotsuyama Racing	McLaren	McLaren F1 GTR	BMW S70/2 6.0 L V12	76	(Japan) Go Shimizu	D	6–8
JLOC	Lamborghini	Lamborghini Diablo JGT-1	Lamborghini L532 6.0 L V12	88	(Japan) Hisashi Wada	D	All
JLOC	Lamborghini	Lamborghini Diablo JGT-1	Lamborghini L532 6.0 L V12	88	(Japan) Naohiro Furuya	D	1–3
JLOC	Lamborghini	Lamborghini Diablo JGT-1	Lamborghini L532 6.0 L V12	88	(Japan) Koji Yamanishi	D	4–8
Raybrig Team Kunimitsu with Mooncraft	Honda	Honda NSX	Honda C32B 3.5 L V6	100	(Japan) Hiroki Katoh	B	All
Raybrig Team Kunimitsu with Mooncraft	Honda	Honda NSX	Honda C32B 3.5 L V6	100	(Japan) Hidetoshi Mitsusada	B	All

=== GT300 ===
Team	Make	Car	Engine	No.	Drivers	Tyre	Rounds
Verno Tokai Dream28	Honda	Honda NSX	Honda C32B 3.4 L V6	2	(Japan) Kazuho Takahashi	Y	All
Verno Tokai Dream28	Honda	Honda NSX	Honda C32B 3.4 L V6	2	(Japan) Akira Watanabe	Y	All
Hasemi Motorsport	Nissan	Nissan Fairlady Z	Nissan VQ35DE 3.5 L V6	3	(Japan) Mitsuhiro Kinoshita	Y	All
Hasemi Motorsport	Nissan	Nissan Fairlady Z	Nissan VQ35DE 3.5 L V6	3	(Japan) Masataka Yanagida	Y	All
Team B-1	Vemac	Vemac RD320R	Honda C32B 3.4 L V6	5	(Japan) Tetsuji Tamanaka	Y	All
Team B-1	Vemac	Vemac RD320R	Honda C32B 3.4 L V6	5	(Japan) "Gō Mifune"	Y	All
RE Amemiya Racing	Mazda	Mazda RX-7	Mazda RE20B 2.0 L 3-rotor	7	(Japan) Nobuteru Taniguchi	Y	All
RE Amemiya Racing	Mazda	Mazda RX-7	Mazda RE20B 2.0 L 3-rotor	7	(Japan) Takayuki Ohi	Y	All
A&S Racing	Mosler	Mosler MT900R	Chevrolet LS1 6.2 L V8	9	(Japan) Katsuhiko Tsutsui	Y	All
A&S Racing	Mosler	Mosler MT900R	Chevrolet LS1 6.2 L V8	9	(Japan) Ichijo Suga	Y	1–5, 7–8
A&S Racing	Mosler	Mosler MT900R	Chevrolet LS1 6.2 L V8	9	(Japan) Naohiro Furuya	Y	6
Team LeyJun	RGS	RGS Mirage GT1	Chevrolet LS1 5.7 L V8	10	(Japan) "OSAMU"	D	1–6
Team LeyJun	RGS	RGS Mirage GT1	Chevrolet LS1 5.7 L V8	10	(Japan) Shinichi Kurashima	D	1–3
Team LeyJun	RGS	RGS Mirage GT1	Chevrolet LS1 5.7 L V8	10	(Japan) Tatsuya Mizutani	D	4
Team LeyJun	RGS	RGS Mirage GT1	Chevrolet LS1 5.7 L V8	10	(Japan) Naohiro Furuya	D	5–6
Team LeyJun	Vemac	Vemac RD320R	Honda C32B 3.4 L V6	63	(Japan) "OSAMU"	D	8
Team LeyJun	Vemac	Vemac RD320R	Honda C32B 3.4 L V6	63	(Japan) Takamasa Nakagawa	D	8
Jim Gainer Racing	Ferrari	Ferrari 360	Ferrari F131B 3.6 L V8	11	(Japan) Hideshi Matsuda	Y	All
Jim Gainer Racing	Ferrari	Ferrari 360	Ferrari F131B 3.6 L V8	11	(Japan) Tetsuya Tanaka	Y	All
Amprex Motorsports	Mazda	Mazda RX-7	Mazda RE20B 2.0 L 3-rotor	14	(Malaysia) Tengku Djan Ley	BF	5
Amprex Motorsports	Mazda	Mazda RX-7	Mazda RE20B 2.0 L 3-rotor	14	(Japan) Tetsuya Yamano	BF	5
Amprex Motorsports	BMW	BMW M3 (E46)	BMW M52 3.2 L I6	15	(Japan) Genji Hashimoto	BF	All
Amprex Motorsports	BMW	BMW M3 (E46)	BMW M52 3.2 L I6	15	(Hong Kong) Charles Kwan	BF	1–6
Amprex Motorsports	BMW	BMW M3 (E46)	BMW M52 3.2 L I6	15	(Japan) Tetsuya Yamano	BF	7–8
TOM'S Spirit	Toyota	Toyota MR-S (Rd. 1–6); Toyota Celica (Rd. 8)	Toyota 3S-GTE 2.0 L Turbo I4	17	(Japan) Masahiro Matsunaga	Y	1–6, 8
TOM'S Spirit	Toyota	Toyota MR-S (Rd. 1–6); Toyota Celica (Rd. 8)	Toyota 3S-GTE 2.0 L Turbo I4	17	(Japan) Masaoki Nagashima	Y	1–6, 8
Racing Project Bandoh	Toyota	Toyota MR-S (Rd. 1–2); Toyota Celica (Rd. 3–8)	Toyota 3S-GTE 2.0 L Turbo I4	19	(Japan) Takayuki Aoki	Y	All
Racing Project Bandoh	Toyota	Toyota MR-S (Rd. 1–2); Toyota Celica (Rd. 3–8)	Toyota 3S-GTE 2.0 L Turbo I4	19	(Japan) Minoru Tanaka	Y	All
Hitotsuyama Racing	BMW	BMW M3 CSL	BMW S50B32 3.2 L I6	21	(Japan) Mikio Hitotsuyama	D	1
Hitotsuyama Racing	BMW	BMW M3 CSL	BMW S50B32 3.2 L I6	21	(Japan) Takeshi Namekawa	D	1–2
Hitotsuyama Racing	BMW	BMW M3 CSL	BMW S50B32 3.2 L I6	21	(Japan) Yasushi Hitotsuyama	D	2–5
Hitotsuyama Racing	BMW	BMW M3 CSL	BMW S50B32 3.2 L I6	21	(Japan) Haruhiko Matsumoto	D	3–5
Team Taisan	Porsche	Porsche 911 GT3-R	Porsche M96/77 3.6 L F6	24	(Japan) Akihiro Asai	Y	All
Team Taisan	Porsche	Porsche 911 GT3-R	Porsche M96/77 3.6 L F6	24	(Japan) Atsushi Yogo	Y	1, 3–8
Team Taisan	Porsche	Porsche 911 GT3-R	Porsche M96/77 3.6 L F6	24	(United Kingdom) Adam Wilcox	Y	2
Team Taisan	Porsche	Porsche 911 GT3-R	Porsche M96/77 3.6 L F6	26	(Japan) Shinichi Yamaji	Y	All
Team Taisan	Porsche	Porsche 911 GT3-R	Porsche M96/77 3.6 L F6	26	(Japan) Kazuyushi Nishizawa	Y	All
Team Taisan	Dodge	Dodge Viper Competition Coupe	Dodge EWC 8.0 L V10	55	(Japan) Eiji Yamada	Y	All
Team Taisan	Dodge	Dodge Viper Competition Coupe	Dodge EWC 8.0 L V10	55	(Japan) Takayuki Kinoshita	Y	All
Team Reckless	Toyota	Toyota MR-S	Toyota 3S-GTE 2.0 L Turbo I4	31	(Japan) Kota Sasaki	BF	All
Team Reckless	Toyota	Toyota MR-S	Toyota 3S-GTE 2.0 L Turbo I4	31	(Japan) Satoshi Goto	BF	All
Dentaire ProJet Racing with apr	Toyota	Toyota MR-S	Toyota 3S-GTE 2.0 L Turbo I4	34	(Japan) Seigo Nishizawa	BF	All
Dentaire ProJet Racing with apr	Toyota	Toyota MR-S	Toyota 3S-GTE 2.0 L Turbo I4	34	(Japan) Koji Matsuda	BF	All
Autobacs Racing Team Aguri	ASL	ASL ARTA Garaiya	Nissan SR20DET 2.0 L Turbo I4	43	(Japan) Morio Nitta	BF	All
Autobacs Racing Team Aguri	ASL	ASL ARTA Garaiya	Nissan SR20DET 2.0 L Turbo I4	43	(Japan) Shinichi Takagi	BF	All
Auto Staff Racing	Nissan	Nissan Silvia (S15)	Nissan SR20DET 2.0 L Turbo I4	51	(Japan) Naofumi Omoto	Y	1–6, 8
Auto Staff Racing	Nissan	Nissan Silvia (S15)	Nissan SR20DET 2.0 L Turbo I4	51	(Japan) Masanobu Kato	Y	2–8
Auto Staff Racing	Nissan	Nissan Silvia (S15)	Nissan SR20DET 2.0 L Turbo I4	51	(United Kingdom) Adam Wilcox	Y	1
Auto Staff Racing	Nissan	Nissan Silvia (S15)	Nissan SR20DET 2.0 L Turbo I4	51	(Japan) Tsuyoshi Shirai	Y	7
R&D Sport	Porsche	Porsche 911 GT3-R	Porsche M96/77 3.6 L F6	61	(Japan) Atsushi Katsumata	D	2–3, 5–6
R&D Sport	Porsche	Porsche 911 GT3-R	Porsche M96/77 3.6 L F6	61	(Japan) Takeyuki Kishi	D	2–3
R&D Sport	Porsche	Porsche 911 GT3-R	Porsche M96/77 3.6 L F6	61	(Japan) Keiko Ihara	D	5–6
Team Gaikokuya	Porsche	Porsche 996 GT3-RS	Porsche M96/77 3.6 L F6	69	(Japan) Yutaka Yamagishi	Y	All
Team Gaikokuya	Porsche	Porsche 996 GT3-RS	Porsche M96/77 3.6 L F6	69	(Japan) Kei Idaka	Y	All
Team Gaikokuya	Porsche	Porsche 996 GT3-RS	Porsche M96/77 3.6 L F6	70	(Japan) Yoshimi Ishibashi	D	All
Team Gaikokuya	Porsche	Porsche 996 GT3-RS	Porsche M96/77 3.6 L F6	70	(Japan) Go Shimizu	D	1–4
Team Gaikokuya	Porsche	Porsche 996 GT3-RS	Porsche M96/77 3.6 L F6	70	(Japan) Hiroshi Wada	D	5, 8
Team Gaikokuya	Porsche	Porsche 996 GT3-RS	Porsche M96/77 3.6 L F6	70	(Japan) Isao Isashi	D	6–7
SigmaTec Racing Team	Toyota	Toyota MR-S (Rd. 1–4); Toyota Celica (Rd. 5–8)	Toyota 3S-GTE 2.0 L Turbo I4	71	(Japan) Keita Sawa	D	All
SigmaTec Racing Team	Toyota	Toyota MR-S (Rd. 1–4); Toyota Celica (Rd. 5–8)	Toyota 3S-GTE 2.0 L Turbo I4	71	(Japan) Guts Jyonai	D	1–5
SigmaTec Racing Team	Toyota	Toyota MR-S (Rd. 1–4); Toyota Celica (Rd. 5–8)	Toyota 3S-GTE 2.0 L Turbo I4	71	(Japan) Tatsuya Kataoka	D	6–7
SigmaTec Racing Team	Toyota	Toyota MR-S (Rd. 1–4); Toyota Celica (Rd. 5–8)	Toyota 3S-GTE 2.0 L Turbo I4	71	(Japan) Haruki Kurosawa	D	8
Cusco Racing	Subaru	Subaru Impreza WRX STI	Subaru EJ20 2.0 L Turbo F4	77	(Japan) Katsuo Kobayashi	Y	All
Cusco Racing	Subaru	Subaru Impreza WRX STI	Subaru EJ20 2.0 L Turbo F4	77	(Japan) Tatsuya Tanigawa	Y	All
Team Daishin	Nissan	Nissan Silvia (S15)	Nissan SR20DET 2.0 L Turbo I4	81	(Japan) Kazuki Hoshino	Y	All
Team Daishin	Nissan	Nissan Silvia (S15)	Nissan SR20DET 2.0 L Turbo I4	81	(Japan) Tadao Uematsu	Y	All
Arktech Motorsports	Porsche	Porsche 996 GT3	Porsche M96/77 3.6 L F6	111	(Japan) Hiroya Iijima	D	2–6, 8
Arktech Motorsports	Porsche	Porsche 996 GT3	Porsche M96/77 3.6 L F6	111	(Japan) Shigemitsu Haga	D	2–6, 8
910 Racing	Porsche	Porsche 996 GT3 RS	Porsche M96/77 3.6 L F6	910	(Japan) Akira Hirakawa	Y	All
910 Racing	Porsche	Porsche 996 GT3 RS	Porsche M96/77 3.6 L F6	910	(Japan) Yasuo Miyagawa	Y	All
910 Racing	Porsche	Porsche 996 GT3 RS	Porsche M96/77 3.6 L F6	911	(Japan) Kazuyoshi Takamizawa	Y	2, 4–6, 8
910 Racing	Porsche	Porsche 996 GT3 RS	Porsche M96/77 3.6 L F6	911	(Japan) Jukuchou Sunako	Y	2, 4–6, 8

== Schedule ==
Round	Race	Circuit	Date
1	GT Championship in TI	(Japan) TI Circuit	March 30
2	All Japan GT Fuji 500	(Japan) Fuji Speedway	May 4
3	SUGO GT Championship	(Japan) Sportsland SUGO	May 25
4	Malaysian JGTC in Fuji Speedway	(Japan) Fuji Speedway	July 13
5	Japan Special GT Cup	(Japan) Fuji Speedway	August 3
6	Motegi GT Championship Race	(Japan) Twin Ring Motegi	September 14
7	Japan GT in Kyushu 300 km	(Japan) Autopolis	October 26
8	Suzuka GT 300 km	(Japan) Suzuka Circuit	November 16

- Due to the SARS outbreak, round 4 of the championship, which was planned to be held at the Sepang Circuit on June 20 and 21, was cancelled and later replaced by a round at Fuji Speedway. The replacement Fuji round featured a unique format of two heat races, each featuring a sprint race for one of the team's drivers. The combined results of both heats would determine the overall winner of the round.

== Season results ==
Round	Circuit	GT500 Winning Team	GT300 Winning Team
Round	Circuit	GT500 Winning Drivers	GT300 Winning Drivers
1	TI Circuit	#1 ESSO Team LeMans Toyota Supra	#24 Advan Team Taisan Porsche 996
1	TI Circuit	(Japan) Juichi Wakisaka (Japan) Akira Iida	(Japan) Atsushi Yogo (Japan) Akihiro Asai
2	Mt. Fuji	#22 Motul NISMO Nissan Skyline GT-R	#26 Advan Team Taisan Porsche 996
2	Mt. Fuji	(United Kingdom) Richard Lyons (Japan) Masami Kageyama	(Japan) Shinichi Yamaji (Japan) Kazuyuki Nishizawa
3	Sportsland SUGO	#1 ESSO Team LeMans Toyota Supra	#31 Team Reckless Toyota MR-S
3	Sportsland SUGO	(Japan) Juichi Wakisaka (Japan) Akira Iida	(Japan) Kota Sasaki (Japan) Satoshi Goto
4	Mt. Fuji	Heat 1: #12 Calsonic Impul Nissan Skyline GT-R	Heat 1: #3 Hasemi Motorsports Nissan Fairlady Z
4	Mt. Fuji	(Japan) Yuji Ide	(Japan) Masataka Yanagida
4	Mt. Fuji	Heat 2: #12 Calsonic Impul Nissan Skyline GT-R	Heat 2: #11 Team Gainer Ferrari F360
4	Mt. Fuji	(France) Benoît Tréluyer	(Japan) Tetsuya Tanaka
4	Mt. Fuji	Overall: #12 Calsonic Impul Nissan Skyline GT-R	Overall: #55 Eclipse Taisan Advan Dodge Viper
4	Mt. Fuji	(Japan) Yuji Ide (France) Benoît Tréluyer	(Japan) Eiji Yamada (Japan) Takayuki Kinoshita
5	Mt. Fuji	#18 Takata Dome Honda NSX	#19 WedsSport Toyota Celica
5	Mt. Fuji	(Japan) Ryō Michigami (France) Sebastien Philippe	(Japan) Takayuki Aoki (Japan) Minoru Tanaka
6	Twin Ring Motegi	#16 G-ZOX Dome Honda NSX	#71 Sigmatech Toyota Celica
6	Twin Ring Motegi	(Netherlands) Tom Coronel (Japan) Daisuke Ito	(Japan) Tatsuya Kataoka (Japan) Keita Sawa
7	Autopolis	#39 Denso Team SARD Toyota Supra	#71 Sigmatech Toyota Celica
7	Autopolis	(Japan) Manabu Orido (Germany) Dominik Schwager	(Japan) Tatsuya Kataoka (Japan) Keita Sawa
8	Suzuka Circuit	#12 Calsonic Impul Nissan Skyline GT-R	#19 WedsSport Toyota Celica
8	Suzuka Circuit	(Japan) Yuji Ide (France) Benoît Tréluyer	(Japan) Takayuki Aoki (Japan) Minoru Tanaka

== Standings ==
=== GT500 class ===
==== Drivers' standings ====
Scoring system

Position	1st	2nd	3rd	4th	5th	6th	7th	8th	9th	10th
Points	20	15	12	10	8	6	4	3	2	1
Qualifying	1	1	1							
Fastest lap	1	1	1							

Rank	No.	Driver	TAI (Japan)	FUJ (Japan)	SUG (Japan)	FUJ (Japan)	FUJ (Japan)	MOT (Japan)	AUT (Japan)	SUZ (Japan)	Pts.
1	23	(Japan) Satoshi Motoyama (Germany) Michael Krumm	2	4	3	5	2	11	5	3	86
2	1	(Japan) Akira Iida (Japan) Juichi Wakisaka	1	12	1	6	4	4	4	7	83
3	22	(Japan) Masami Kageyama (United Kingdom) Richard Lyons	8	1	5	2	11	13	6	4	65
4	12	(France) Benoît Tréluyer (Japan) Yuji Ide	12	2	Ret	1	16	6	11	1	64
5	36	(France) Érik Comas (Japan) Takeshi Tsuchiya	6	10	2	7	5	2	8	8	61
6	39	(Japan) Manabu Orido (Germany) Dominik Schwager	14	3	14	3	7	7	1	9	57
7	18	(Japan) Ryō Michigami	3	Ret	7	8	1	14	Ret	2	55
7	18	(France) Sébastien Philippe	3	Ret	7	8	1	14		2	55
9	38	(Japan) Hironori Takeuchi (Japan) Yuji Tachikawa	Ret	DSQ	10	4	3	9	3	13	46
10	16	(Netherlands) Tom Coronel (Japan) Daisuke Ito	4	Ret	9	12	8	1	10	11	38
11	64	(Japan) Tsugio Matsuda	5	6	8	13	9	Ret	2	12	36
12	100	(Japan) Hiroki Katoh (Japan) Hidetoshi Mitsusada	7	7	16	17	13	5	9	5	27
13	25	(France) Jérémie Dufour	10	Ret	4	14	17	3	12	Ret	35
13	25	(Japan) Seiji Ara	10		4	14	17	3	12	Ret	35
15	35	(Japan) Naoki Hattori (Japan) Shigekazu Wakisaka	9	5	6	10	10	12	7	10	24
16	64	(Germany) André Lotterer				13	9	Ret	2	12	19
17	64	(Japan) Takashi Kogure	5	6	8						17
18	37	(Italy) Marco Apicella (Japan) Takuya Kurosawa	Ret	8	13	15	6	10	13	14	15
19	8	(Japan) Keiichi Tsuchiya	11	Ret	11	11	12	8	Ret	6	9
19	8	(Japan) Toshihiro Kaneishi	11	Ret	11		12	8	Ret	6	9
20	76	(Japan) Eiichi Tajima	13	9	12	18	14	Ret	DNP	15	2
20	76	(Japan) Yudai Igarashi	13	9	12						2
20	62	(Japan) Shogo Mitsuyama (Japan) Shinsuke Shibahara		11	15	9	Ret	Ret		16	2
-	8	(Japan) Katsutomo Kaneishi				11					0
-	76	(Japan) Haruki Kurosawa				18	14				0
-	88	(Japan) Hisashi Wada	15	Ret	Ret	16	15	15	Ret	Ret	0
-	88	(Japan) Koji Yamanishi				16	15	15	Ret	Ret	0
-	88	(Japan) Naohiro Furuya	15	Ret	Ret						0
-	76	(Japan) Go Shimizu						Ret	DNP	15	0
-	25	(Japan) Hideki Noda		Ret							0
-	18	(Italy) Paolo Montin							Ret		0
Rank	No.	Driver	TAI (Japan)	FUJ (Japan)	SUG (Japan)	FUJ (Japan)	FUJ (Japan)	MOT (Japan)	AUT (Japan)	SUZ (Japan)	Pts.

Colour	Result
Gold	Winner
Silver	Second place
Bronze	Third place
Green	Points classification
Blue	Non-points classification
Blue	Non-classified finish (NC)
Purple	Retired, not classified (Ret)
Red	Did not qualify (DNQ)
Red	Did not pre-qualify (DNPQ)
Black	Disqualified (DSQ)
White	Did not start (DNS)
White	Withdrew (WD)
White	Race cancelled (C)
Blank	Did not practice (DNP)
Blank	Did not arrive (DNA)
Blank	Excluded (EX)

==== Teams' standings ====
For teams that entered multiple cars, only the best result from each round counted towards the teams' championship.

Rank	Team	No.	TAI (Japan)	FUJ (Japan)	SUG (Japan)	FUJ (Japan)	FUJ (Japan)	MOT (Japan)	AUT (Japan)	SUZ (Japan)	Pts.
1	Nismo	22	8	1	5	2	11	13	6	4	106
1	Nismo	23	2	4	3	5	2	11	5	3	106
2	Esso Toyota Team LeMans	1	1	12	1	6	4	4	4	7	83
3	Dome Racing Team	16					8	1	10	11	77
3	Dome Racing Team	18	3	Ret	7	8	1	14	Ret	2	77
4	Toyota Team TOM'S	36	6	10	2	7	5	2	8	8	66
4	Toyota Team TOM'S	37	Ret	8	13	15	6	10	13	14	66
5	Team Impul	12	12	2	Ret	1	16	6	11	1	64
6	Toyota Team SARD	39	14	3	14	3	7	7	1	9	57
7	Toyota Team Cerumo	38	DNS	DSQ	10	4	3	9	3	13	46
8	Mobil 1 Nakajima Racing	64	5	6	8	13	9	Ret	2	12	36
9	Team Kunimitsu with Mooncraft	100	7	7	16	17	13	5	9	5	27
10	Team Advan Tsuchiya	25	10	Ret	4	14	17	3	12	Ret	35
11	Kraft	35	9	5	6	10	10	12	7	10	24
12	Mugen	16	4	Ret	9	12					13
13	Autobacs Racing Team Aguri	8	11	Ret	11	11	12	8	Ret	6	9
14	Hitotsuyama Racing	76	13	9	12	18	14	Ret		15	2
14	R&D Sports	62		11	15	9	Ret	Ret		16	2
-	JLOC	88	15	Ret	Ret	16	15	15	Ret	Ret	0
Rank	Team	No.	TAI (Japan)	FUJ (Japan)	SUG (Japan)	FUJ (Japan)	FUJ (Japan)	MOT (Japan)	AUT (Japan)	SUZ (Japan)	Pts.

=== GT300 Drivers' championship ===
Rank	No.	Driver	TAI (Japan)	FUJ (Japan)	SUG (Japan)	FUJ (Japan)	FUJ (Japan)	MOT (Japan)	AUT (Japan)	SUZ (Japan)	Pts.
1	3	(Japan) Takayuki Kinoshita (Japan) Masataka Yanagida	6	2	17	3	21	3	4	2	77
2	71	(Japan) Keita Sawa	4	7	Ret	Ret	Ret	1	1	3	72
3	26	(Japan) Kazuyushi Nishizawa (Japan) Shinichi Takagi	2	1	8	6	4	Ret	3	9	72
4	19	(Japan) Takayuki Aoki (Japan) Minoru Tanaka	8	DNQ	20	5	1	8	16	1	63
5	31	(Japan) Kota Sasaki (Japan) Satoshi Goto	3	5	1	14	3	6	11	11	61
6	81	(Japan) Kazuki Hoshino (Japan) Tadao Uematsu	7	6	7	4	2	4	10	4	61
7	43	(Japan) Morio Nitta (Japan) Shinichi Takagi	19	3	4	10	6	2	5	21	55
8	11	(Japan) Hideshi Matsuda (Japan) Tetsuya Tanaka	13	4	Ret	2	20	Ret	2	12	46
9	71	(Japan) Tatsuya Kataoka						1	1		44
10	24	(Japan) Akihiro Asai	1	11	13	8	10	18	8	5	38
11	24	(Japan) Atsushi Yogo	1		13	8	10	18	8	5	38
12	55	(Japan) Eiji Yamada (Japan) Takayuki Kinoshita	16	16	Ret	1	5	Ret	7	Ret	34
13	5	(Japan) Tetsuji Tamanaka (Japan) "Gō Mifune"	9	9	2	19	7	Ret	6	7	34
14	2	(Japan) Kazuho Takahashi (Japan) Akira Watanabe	5	Ret	5	21	9	19	13	8	22
15	7	(Japan) Takayuki Ohi	21	10	3	Ret	Ret	14	20	6	19
16	71	(Japan) Guts Jyonai	4	7	Ret	Ret	Ret				16
17	7	(Japan) Nobuteru Taniguchi	21	10	3	Ret	Ret	14	20		13
18	71	(Japan) Haruki Kurosawa								3	12
18	51	(Japan) Naofumi Omoto	12	13	11	7	8	7		14	11
20	51	(Japan) Masanobu Kato		13	11	7	8	7	17	14	11
21	77	(Japan) Katsuo Kobayashi (Japan) Tatsuya Tanigawa	10	Ret	6	24	19	Ret	9	Ret	10
22	34	(Japan) Seigo Nishizawa (Japan) Koji Matsuda	Ret	14	18	11	Ret	5	19	17	8
23	21/7	(Japan) Haruhiko Matsumoto			14	DNQ	DNQ	DNA		6	6
24	910	(Japan) Akira Hirakawa (Japan) Yasuo Miyagawa	20	8	10	13	11	15	21	10	5
25	17	(Japan) Masahiro Matsunaga (Japan) Masaoki Nagashima	18	18	12	9	Ret	9		20	4
26	69	(Japan) Yutaka Yamagishi (Japan) Kei Idaka	11	15	9	20	13	10	12	18	3
27	9	(Japan) Katsuhiko Tsutsui	15	Ret	15	17	12	Ret	15	13	1
27	9	(Japan) Ichijo Suga	15	Ret	15	17	12		15	13	1
-	51/24	(United Kingdom) Adam Wilcox	12	11							0
-	911	(Japan) Kazuyoshi Takamizawa (Japan) Jukuchou Sunako		17	DNA	22	15	11		16	0
-	14	(Japan) Genji Hashimoto	14	12	Ret	15	Ret	13	14	Ret	0
-	14	(Hong Kong) Charles Kwan	14	12	Ret	15	Ret	13			0
-	70	(Japan) Yoshimi Ishibashi	17	18	16	12	18	17	18	15	0
-	70	(Japan) Go Shimizu	17	18	16	12					0
-	61	(Japan) Atsushi Katsumata		Ret	DNP		16	12			0
-	61	(Japan) Keiko Ihara					16	12			0
-	21	(Japan) Yasushi Hitotsuyama		Ret	14	DNQ	DNQ	DNA			0
-	10/63	(Japan) "OSAMU"	Ret	Ret	DNQ	Ret	14	DNQ		Ret	0
-	10	(Japan) Naohiro Furuya					14	DNQ			0
-	14/15	(Japan) Tetsuya Yamano					22		14	Ret	0
-	70	(Japan) Hiroshi Wada					18			15	0
-	111	(Japan) Hiroya Iijima (Japan) Shigemitsu Haga		19	19	16	17	16		19	0
-	70	(Japan) Isao Isashi						17	18		0
-	51	(Japan) Tsuyoshi Shirai							17		0
-	14	(Malaysia) Tengku Djan Ley					22				0
-	10	(Japan) Shinichi Kurashima	Ret	Ret	DNQ						0
-	21	(Japan) Takeshi Namekawa	Ret	Ret							0
-	21	(Japan) Mikio Hitotsuyama	Ret								0
-	61	(Japan) Takeyuki Kishi		Ret	DNP						0
-	10	(Japan) Tatsuya Mizutani				Ret	WD				0
-	9	(Japan) Akira Ishikawa						Ret			0
-	10	(Japan) Takamasa Nakagawa								Ret	0
Rank	No.	Driver	TAI (Japan)	FUJ (Japan)	SUG (Japan)	FUJ (Japan)	FUJ (Japan)	MOT (Japan)	AUT (Japan)	SUZ (Japan)	Pts.

==== GT300 Teams' standings ====
For teams that entered multiple cars, only the best result from each round counted towards the teams' championship.

Rank	Team	No.	TAI (Japan)	FUJ (Japan)	SUG (Japan)	FUJ (Japan)	FUJ (Japan)	MOT (Japan)	AUT (Japan)	SUZ (Japan)	Pts.
1	Team Taisan with Advan	26	2	1	8	6	4	Ret	3	9	88
1	Team Taisan with Advan	55	16	16	Ret	1	5	Ret	7	Ret	88
2	Hasemi Motorsport	3	6	2	17	3	21	3	4	2	77
3	Sigma Tech Racing Team	71	4	7	Ret	Ret	Ret	1	1	3	72
4	Racing Project Bandoh	19	8	DNQ	20	5	1	8	16	1	63
5	Team Reckless	31	3	5	1	14	3	6	11	11	61
5	Team Daishin	81	7	6	7	4	2	4	10	4	61
7	Autobacs Racing Team Aguri	43	19	3	4	10	6	2	5	21	55
8	Team Gainer	11	13	4	Ret	2	20	Ret	2	12	46
9	Team Taisan Advan jr.	24	1	11	13	8	10	18	8	5	38
10	Team B-1	5	9	9	2	19	7	Ret	6	7	34
11	Verno Tokai Dream28	2	5	Ret	5	21	9	19	13	8	22
12	RE Amemiya Racing	7	21	10	3	Ret	Ret	14	20	6	19
13	Auto Staff Racing	51	12	13	11	7	8	7	17	14	11
14	Cusco Racing	77	10	Ret	6	24	19	Ret	9	Ret	10
15	Dentaire ProJet Racing with apr	34	Ret	14	18	11	Ret	5	19	17	8
16	910 Racing	910	20	8	10	13	11	15	21	10	5
16	910 Racing	911		17	DNA	22	15	11		16	5
17	TOM'S Spirit	17	18	18	12	9	Ret	9		20	4
18	Team Gaikokuya	69	11	15	9	20	13	10	12	18	3
18	Team Gaikokuya	70	17	18	16	12	18	17	18	15	3
19	A&S Racing	9	15	Ret	15	17	12	Ret	15	13	1
-	Amprex Motorsports	14					22				0
-	Amprex Motorsports	15	14	12	Ret	15	Ret	13	14	Ret	0
-	R&D Sport	61		Ret	DNP		16	12		16	0
-	Hitotsuyama Racing	21	Ret	Ret	14	DNQ	DNQ	DNA			0
-	Team LeyJun	10	Ret	Ret	DNQ	Ret	14	DNQ			0
-	Team LeyJun	63								Ret	0
-	Arktech Motorsports	111		19	19	16	17	16		19	0
Rank	Team	No.	TAI (Japan)	FUJ (Japan)	SUG (Japan)	FUJ (Japan)	FUJ (Japan)	MOT (Japan)	AUT (Japan)	SUZ (Japan)	Pts.
