= Racing Project Bandoh =

Japanese racing team

(Japan) Racing Project Bandoh
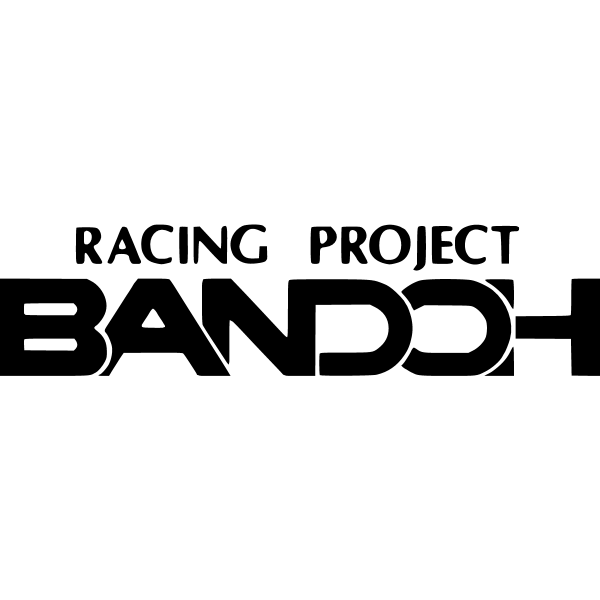
- Founded: December 7, 1990
- Base: Machida, Tokyo Onoji-cho, 1059
- Team principal(s): Masataka Bandoh
- Founder(s): Masaaki Bandoh
- Current series: Super GT
- Former series: JTCC, JGTC
- Current drivers: Yuji Kunimoto; Sena Sakaguchi
- Teams' Championships: 2 (JGTC, 1997/GT300, 2009)
- Drivers' Championships: 2 (JGTC, 1997/GT300, 2009)
- Website: www.bandohracing.com

Racing Project Bandoh Ltd. is a Japanese racing team competing in the Super GT series.

== Racing history ==
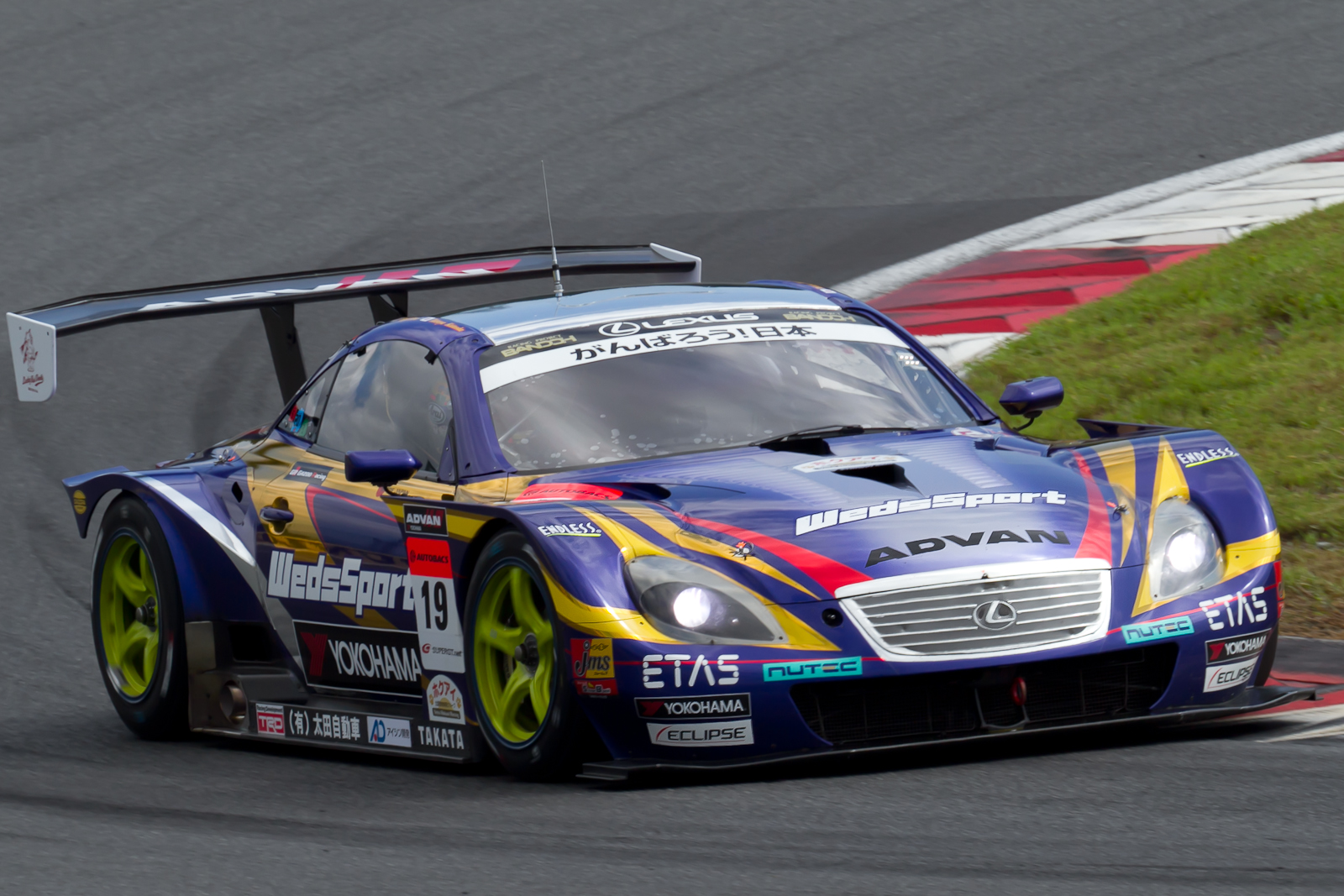
#19 WedsSport ADVAN Lexus SC430 at Fuji Speedway in 2011

Created in 1990 by Masaaki Bando, Racing Project Bandoh raced in the All Japan Touring Car Championship from 1987 (as an earlier organization created by Bando until 1990) to 1997 and entered the Japanese Grand Touring Championship in 1997, competing with a Nissan Silvia S14 in the GT300 class winning five consecutive podiums. In the team's first year of competition, drivers Hideo Fukuyama and Manabu Orido won the GT300 class championship. The next year Bandoh switched to a Toyota Celica, but could not recreate the success of the previous year, taking no podiums with driver Manabu Orido placing second in the drivers' championship. Racing Project Bandoh won the first race of the season at the Suzuka GT 300, and ended the season with drivers Takahiko Hara and Manabu Orido taking third in the drivers championship. Three points behind the winner, Morio Nitta. Bandoh would win one race in 2000 at Sportsland SUGO, and one race in 2001 at Twin Ring Motegi.

2003 brought more success for the team after changing to a new Toyota Celica mid-way through the season, taking wins at Mt. Fuji and Suzuka and drivers Takayuki Aoki and Minoru Tanaka finishing fourth in the championship. Bandoh won one race at Sportsland SUGO in 2004.

It was not until 2007 that Racing Project Bandoh would achieve victory again, winning the fifth round of the season at Sportsland SUGO. In 2008 the team won the seventh round of the season at Motegi. The same year Masaaki Bando's son Masataka Bando took over operations of the team after Masaaki Bando was appointed as the chairman of the Super GT series. The following year in 2009 drivers Manabu Orido and Tatsuya Kataoka in a Lexus IS350 took five podiums including one win. As a result, Racing Project Bandoh won both the team and drivers championship by 3 points over Nobuteru Taniguchi and Ryo Orime in the GT300 class.

In 2011 Racing Project Bandoh moved to the GT500 class competing in a Lexus SC430 under the name LEXUS TEAM WedsSport BANDOH.

In 2015 and 2016 the team fielded both a Lexus RC F in the GT500 class and a Toyota 86 in the GT300 class in conjunction with UP GARAGE.

Racing Project Bandoh has long been associated with the team's main sponsor WedsSport, a Japanese aftermarket wheel manufacturer.

== Results ==
=== Complete JGTC Results ===
(key) (Races in bold indicate pole position) (Races in italics indicate fastest lap)

Year	Car	Tyres	Class	No.	Drivers	1	2	3	4	5	6	7	8	Pos	Pts
1997	Nissan Silvia S14	Y	GT300	19	(Japan) Manabu Orido (Japan) Hideo Fukuyama	SUZ; 1	**FUJ**; 2	SEN; 2	FUJ; 3	MIN; 1	SUG; 5			1st	90
1998	Toyota Celica	Y	GT300	19	(Japan) Manabu Orido (Italy) Max Angelelli (Japan) Katsumi Yamamoto	SUZ	FUJ	SEN	FUJ; 7	MOT; 2	**MIN**; 2	SUG; 3		2nd	46
1999	Toyota Celica	Y	GT300	19	(Japan) Manabu Orido (Japan) Takahiko Hara	SUZ; 1	FUJ; 2	SUG; Ret	MIN; 3	FUJ; Ret	OKA; 5	MOT; 2		3rd	70
2000	Toyota Celica	Y	GT300	19	(Japan) Shigekazu Wakisaka (Japan) Takahiko Hara	MOT; 3	FUJ; Ret	SUG; 1	FUJ; Ret	OKA; 3	MIN; 15	SUZ; 17		5th	44
2001	Toyota MR-S	Y	GT300	19	(Japan) Minoru Tanaka (Japan) Satoshi Goto	OKA; DNA	FUJ; 16	SUG; 10	FUJ; 3	**MOT**; 1	SUZ; 17	MIN; 13		9th	33
2002	Toyota MR-S	Y	GT300	19	(Japan) Minoru Tanaka (Japan) Satoshi Goto	OKA; 18	FUJ; 5	SUG; Ret	SEP; 6	FUJ; 22	MOT; 6	MIN; 6	SUZ; 12	10th	31
2003	Toyota MR-S	Y	GT300	19	(Japan) Takayuki Aoki (Japan) Minoru Tanaka	OKA; 8	FUJ; DNQ							4th	63
2003	Toyota Celica	Y	GT300	19	(Japan) Takayuki Aoki (Japan) Minoru Tanaka			SUG; 20	FUJ; 5	FUJ; **1**	MOT; 8	AUT; 16	SUZ; 1	4th	63
2004	Toyota Celica	Y	GT300	19	(Japan) Takayuki Aoki (Japan) Nobuteru Taniguchi	OKA; 4	SUG; 1	SEP; NC	TOK; 7	MOT; 13	AUT; 5	SUZ; 5		6th	48

=== Complete Super GT Results ===
(key) (Races in bold indicate pole position) (Races in italics indicate fastest lap)

Year	Car	Tyres	Class	No.	Drivers	1	2	3	4	5	6	7	8	9	Pos	Points
2005	Toyota Celica	Y	GT300	19	(Japan) Hiroki Kato (Japan) Nobuteru Taniguchi	**OKA**; 7	FUJ; 6	SEP; 7	SUG; 7	MOT; 2	FUJ; 6	AUT; 3	SUZ; 9		7th	54
2006	Toyota Celica	Y	GT300	19	(Japan) Koji Matsuda (Japan) Shigekazu Wakisaka	SUZ; 4	OKA; 10	FUJ; 17	SEP; 3	SUG; 18	SUZ; 19	MOT; 16	AUT; 12	FUJ; 2	10th	35
2007	Toyota Celica	Y	GT300	19	(Japan) Akira Iida (Japan) Yuhi Sekiguchi	SUZ; 14	OKA; 19	FUJ; Ret	SEP; 9	SUG; 1	SUZ; 12	MOT; 18	AUT; 4	FUJ; 16	9th	46
2008	Toyota Celica	Y	GT300	19	(Japan) Manabu Orido (Japan) Tsubasa Abe	SUZ; 7	OKA; Ret								11th	48
2008	Lexus IS350	Y	GT300	19	(Japan) Manabu Orido (Japan) Tsubasa Abe (Japan) Yuhi Sekiguchi			FUJ; 9	SEP; Ret	**SUG**; 15	SUZ; 19	MOT; 1	AUT; 10	FUJ; 5	11th	48
2009	Lexus IS350	Y	GT300	19	(Japan) Manabu Orido (Japan) Tatsuya Kataoka	OKA; 1	SUZ; 8	FUJ; 5	SEP; 2	SUG; 5	SUZ; 6	FUJ; 4	AUT; 3	MOT; 3	1st	112
2010	Lexus IS350	Y	GT300	19	(Japan) Manabu Orido (Japan) Tatsuya Kataoka	SUZ; 3	OKA; 14	FUJ; 4	SEP; 9	SUG; Ret	SUZ; 4	FUJ; C	MOT; 7		8th	49
2011	Lexus SC430	Y	GT500	19	(Japan) Tatsuya Kataoka (Japan) Seiji Ara	OKA; 3	FUJ; 15	SEP; 11	SUG; 8	SUZ; 11	FUJ; 13	AUT; 7	MOT; 11		13th	37
2012	Lexus SC430	Y	GT500	19	(Japan) Seiji Ara (Portugal) André Couto	OKA; 12	FUJ; 13	SEP; 9	SUG; 12	SUZ; 6	FUJ; 3	**AUT**; 3	MOT; 5		9th	55
2013	Lexus SC430	Y	GT500	19	(Japan) Seiji Ara (Portugal) André Couto	OKA; 14	FUJ; 11	SEP; 15	SUG; 9	SUZ; 6	FUJ; Ret	AUT; 13	MOT; 10		14th	25
2014	Lexus RC F	Y	GT500	19	(Japan) Yuhi Sekiguchi (Japan) Juichi Wakisaka	OKA; 11	FUJ; 7	AUT; 8	SUG; 12	FUJ; 11	SUZ; Ret	BUR; 6	MOT; 6		13th	32
2015	Toyota 86	Y	GT300	18 20	(Japan) Yuhki Nakayama (Japan) Yuji Ide (Estonia) Marko Asmer (New Zealand) Nick Cassidy (Japan) Kota Sasaki	OKA; 19	FUJ; Ret	CHA; Ret	FUJ; Ret	SUZ; 21	SUG; 15	AUT; 9	MOT; Ret		28th	2
2015	Lexus RC F	Y	GT500	19	(Japan) Yuhi Sekiguchi (Japan) Juichi Wakisaka	OKA; 10	FUJ; 7	CHA; 9	FUJ; 10	SUZ; 4	SUG; 5	AUT; 9	MOT; 10		10th	47
2016	Toyota 86	Y	GT300	18	(Japan) Yuhki Nakayama (Japan) Shinnosuke Yamada	OKA; 15	FUJ; 4	SUG; 8	FUJ; 10	**SUZ**; 4	CHA; 22	MOT; 12	MOT; 9		12th	46
2016	Lexus RC F	Y	GT500	19	(Japan) Yuji Kunimoto (Japan) Yuhi Sekiguchi	OKA; 9	FUJ; 8	SUG; 5	FUJ; 10	SUZ; 5	**CHA**; 1	MOT; 5	MOT; 3		4th	79
2017	Toyota 86	Y	GT300	18	(Japan) Yuhki Nakayama (Japan) Shintaro Kawabata	OKA; 12	FUJ; 9	AUT; Ret	SUG; 17	FUJ; 11	SUZ; 15	CHA; 7	MOT; 16		18th	23
2017	Lexus LC500 GT500	Y	GT500	19	(Japan) Yuhi Sekiguchi (Japan) Yuji Kunimoto (Japan) Kenta Yamashita (Japan) Kamui Kobayashi	OKA; 6	FUJ; 10	AUT; 8	SUG; 12	FUJ; 7	SUZ; 4	CHA; 12	MOT; 15		12th	41
2018	Lexus LC500 GT500	Y	GT500	19	(Japan) Yuji Kunimoto (Japan) Kenta Yamashita	OKA; 9	FUJ; 12	SUZ; 13	CHA; 3	FUJ; 10	SUG; Ret	AUT; 3	MOT; 5		11th	50
2019	Lexus LC500 GT500	Y	GT500	19	(Japan) Yuji Kunimoto (Japan) Sho Tsuboi	OKA; 6	FUJ; 13	SUZ; 7	BUR; 3	FUJ; 9	AUT; 8	SUG; 13	MOT; 7		11th	46.5
2020	Toyota GR Supra GT500	Y	GT500	19	(Japan) Yuji Kunimoto (Japan) Ritomo Miyata	FUJ; 9	FUJ; 15	SUZ; 10	MOT; Ret	FUJ; 7	SUZ; 9	MOT; 11	FUJ; 10		14th	27
2021	Toyota GR Supra GT500	Y	GT500	19	(Japan) Yuji Kunimoto (Japan) Ritomo Miyata	OKA; 12	**FUJ**; 7	MOT; 2	SUZ; 13	SUG; Ret	AUT; 13	**MOT**; 2	FUJ; 13		11th	53
2022	Toyota GR Supra GT500	Y	GT500	19	(Japan) Yuji Kunimoto (Japan) Sena Sakaguchi	OKA; 13	**FUJ**; 6	**SUZ**; 5	**FUJ**; 9	SUZ; 7	**SUG**; 15	AUT; 5	MOT; 7		11th	44
2023	Toyota GR Supra GT500	Y	GT500	19	(Japan) Yuji Kunimoto (Japan) Sena Sakaguchi	OKA; 9	FUJ; 12	SUZ; 1	FUJ; 12	SUZ; 9	SUG; 8	AUT; 13	MOT; 8		11th	49
2024	Toyota GR Supra GT500	Y	GT500	19	(Japan) Yuji Kunimoto (Japan) Sena Sakaguchi	OKA; 13	FUJ; 10	SUZ; 12	FUJ; 9	SUG; 8	AUT; Ret	MOT; 12	SUZ; 14		15th	21
2025	Toyota GR Supra GT500	Y	GT500	19	(Japan) Yuji Kunimoto (Japan) Sena Sakaguchi (Japan) Kazuto Kotaka	OKA; 12†	FUJ; 14	**SEP**; 5	**FS1**; 4	FS2; 15	SUZ; 14	SUG; 10	AUT; 5	MOT; 11	14th	36.5

^{‡} Half points awarded as less than 75% of race distance was completed. * Season still in progress.
