= Minoru Tanaka (racing driver) =

Japanese racing driver

Minoru Tanaka (田中 実, Minoru Tanaka, born June 1, 1963, Kyoto Prefecture) is a Japanese retired racing driver.

== Career ==
Tanaka was active in automobile racing.

After playing an active part in the Japanese junior formula, Tanaka fully participated in the British Formula 3 Championship in 1990. Future F1 drivers such as Mika Häkkinen, Mika Salo and Hideki Noda also participated in this race. He returned to Japan the following year to compete in Japan's top formula. When the All Japan GT Championship was launched, Tanaka also participated in this race. He mainly participates in Toyota-affiliated teams and has also won the championship. He retired from racing in 2006 and is now the representative of an auto parts manufacturer.

== Japanese Formula 3000 Championship results ==
(key) (Races in bold indicate pole position) (Races in italics indicate fastest lap)

Year	Team	1	2	3	4	5	6	7	8	9	10	11	DC	Pts
1990	Leyton House Racing Team	SUZ	FSW	MIN	SUZ	SUG	FSW	FSW	SUZ	FSW	SUZ; Ret		NC	0
1991	Leyton House Racing Team	SUZ; Ret	AUT; Ret	FSW; DNQ	MIN; 4	SUZ; Ret	SUG; 12	FSW; 15	SUZ	FSW; C	SUZ; 15	FSW; DNQ	18th	3
1992	Team Take One	SUZ; 10	FSW; 10	MIN; Ret	SUZ; Ret	AUT; 9	SUG; Ret	FSW; 15	FSW; Ret	SUZ; 12	FSW; 19	FSW; 14	NC	0
1993	Ad Racing Team	SUZ	FSW	MIN	SUZ	AUT	SUG	FSW	FSW	SUZ	FSW; 17	SUZ; 12	NC	0
1994	Team 5Zigen with Ad Racing Team	SUZ; 14	FSW	MIN	SUZ	SUG	FSW	SUZ	FSW	FSW	SUZ; 13		NC	0

== JGTC/Super GT results ==
(key) (Races in bold indicate pole position) (Races in italics indicate fastest lap)

Year	Team	Car	Class	1	2	3	4	5	6	7	8	9	DC	Pts
1995	Runkup Tomei Sports	Porsche 911	GT1	SUZ	FUJ	SEN	FUJ; 12	SUG; 10	MIN				29th	1
1997	Kraft	Toyota Cavalier	GT300	SUZ	FUJ	SEN	FUJ; 16	MIN; 4	SUG; 16				17th	10
1998	Team Power Kraft	Toyota Supra	GT500	SUZ; 8	FUJ; C	SEN; 10	FUJ; 12	MOT	MIN; Ret	SUG; 7			17th	8
1999	Kraft	Toyota AE86	GT300	SUZ	FUJ	SUG; 11	MIN; 5	FUJ; 10	TAI; 7	MOT; Ret			19th	13
2000	Kraft	Toyota AE86	GT300	MOT	FUJ; 6	SUG; DNS	FUJ; 12	TAI; 9	MIN; 13	SUZ; Ret			21st	8
2001	Racing Project Bandoh	Toyota MR-S	GT300	TAI	FUJ; 16	SUG; 10	FUJ; 3	MOT; 1	SUZ; Ret	MIN; 13			9th	33
2002	Racing Project Bandoh	Toyota MR-S	GT300	TAI; 18	FUJ; 5	SUG; Ret	SEP; 6	FUJ; 22	MOT; 6	MIN; 6	SUZ; 12		12th	31
2003	Racing Project Bandoh	Toyota MR-S	GT300	TAI; 8	FUJ; DNQ								4th	63
2003	Racing Project Bandoh	Toyota Celica	GT300			SUG; 20	FUJ; 5	FUJ; 1	MOT; 8	AUT; 16	SUZ; 1		4th	63
2004	Apex with Apr	Toyota MR-S	GT300	TAI; 7	SUG; 10	SEP; 22	TOK; 5	MOT; Ret	AUT; 10	SUZ; 10			15th	14
2005	Kicchouhouzan with apr	Toyota MR-S	GT300	TAI; 4	FUJ; 5	SEP; 5	SUG; 1	MOT; Ret	FUJ; 7	AUT; Ret	**SUZ**; 7		8th	52
2006	Kicchouhouzan with apr	Toyota MR-S	GT300	SUZ; Ret	TAI; 15	FUJ; 9	SEP; 6	SUG; 6	SUZ; 14	MOT; 9	AUT; 5	**FUJ**; 4	15th	28
