= Manabu Orido =

Japanese racing driver (born 1968)

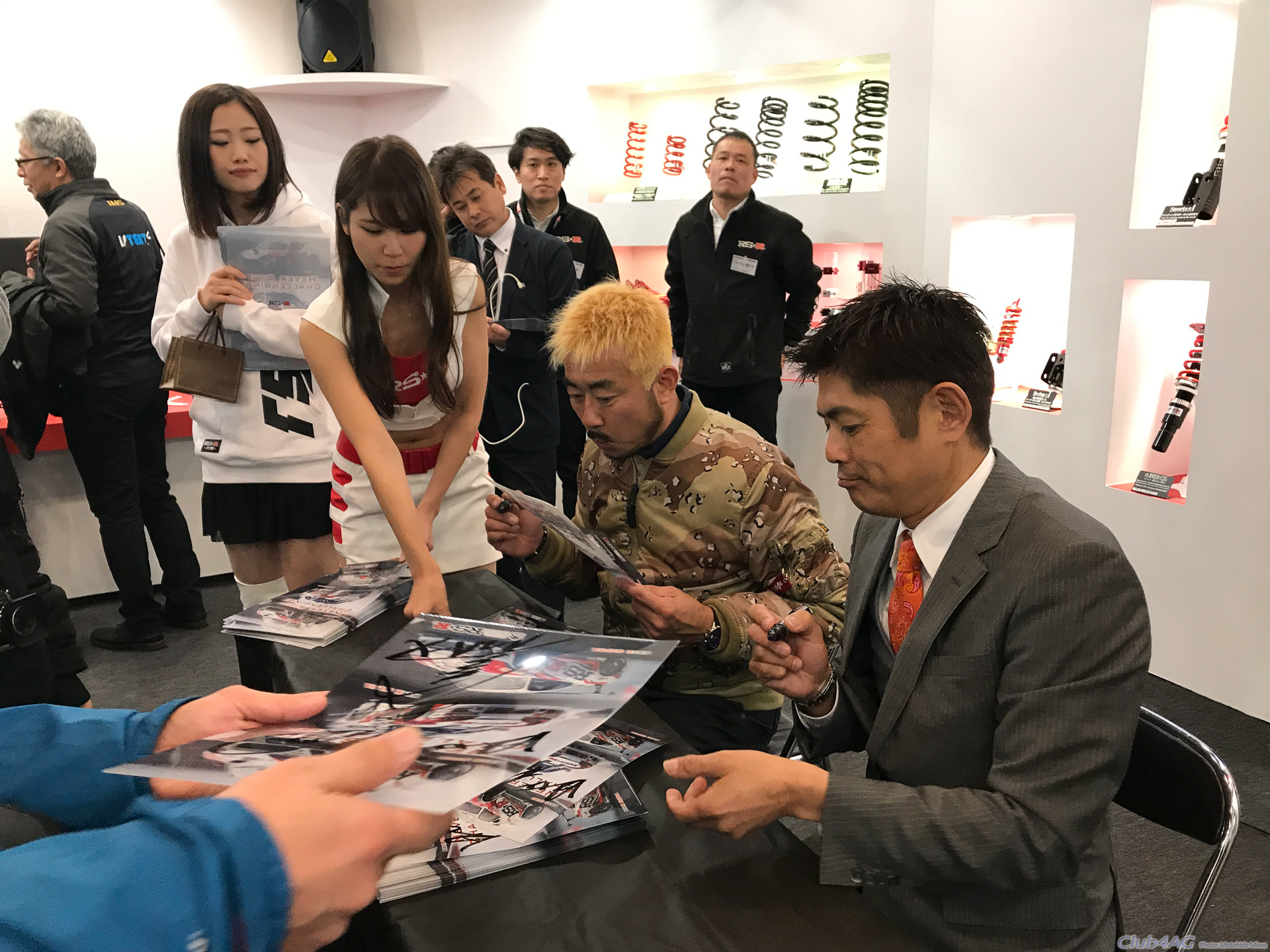
- Orido (right) at Tokyo Auto Salon 2019
- Nationality: (Japan) Japanese
- Born: 3 December 1968 (age 57) Funabashi, Chiba, Japan

Super GT career
- Debut season: 1996
- Current team: apr
- Categorisation: FIA Gold (until 2018); FIA Silver (2019–)
- Car number: 30
- Former teams: Team JLOC; Racing Project Bandoh; Tsuchiya Engineering; Team ADVAN; Team SARD; Team Taisan Jr.; Team JUN
- Championships: 2 (GT300) (1997, 2009)
- Wins: 5 (GT300); 2 (GT500)

24 Hours of Le Mans career
- Years: 2004
- Teams: ChoroQ Racing
- Best finish: 12th (2004)
- Class wins: 0

D1GP career
- Debut season: 2005
- Current team: MAX★ORIDO Racing
- Former teams: RS★R; Team BANDOH
- Championships: 0
- Wins: 3

Super Taikyu career
- Debut season: 2018
- Current team: D'station Racing
- Car number: 47
- Championships: 2 (ST-1) (2018, 2019)
- Wins: 11 (ST-1); 3 (ST-Z)

GT World Challenge Asia career
- Debut season: 2023
- Current team: YZ Racing with BMW Team Studie
- Car number: 50
- Championships: 1 (GT4) (2023)
- Wins: 6 (GT4)

Manabu "MAX" Orido (Shinjitai: 織戸 学, Orido Manabu; born 3 December 1968 in Funabashi, Chiba; alternative nickname Monkichi) is a Japanese professional racing driver. He currently competes in the Super GT series for apr driving a Toyota GR86 GT300, in the Super Taikyu series driving an Aston Martin Vantage GT8R, and in the GT World Challenge Asia series driving a BMW M4 GT4.

Orido is a two-time JGTC / Super GT GT300 class champion, winning the title in 1997 and 2009. He is also a two-time Super Taikyu ST-1 class champion, and GT World Challenge Asia GT4 class champion in 2023.

== Racing career ==
=== Early career ===
Orido began his racing career as a street racer and then progressed to touge racing. He made his professional racing debut in 1990, where, sponsored by the Bandoh Chain of Commerce, Orido entered a drift contest organized by the automobile magazine CARBOY. He emerged as the grand champion and promptly moved on to circuit racing.

In 1992, Orido made his debut in the Fuji Freshman race for Yokohama Rubber. During his time in the Freshman series, Orido earned a class victory in the NA-1600 class in the Fuji Freshman, and a three-time winner in the Suzuka Freshman's N2-1600 class.

=== JGTC ===
==== 1996–1999: JGTC Debut and GT300 Dominance ====
After years of one make series, he first appeared in the JGTC series in 1996, driving for Team JUN and Team Taisan Jr. as a part-time driver, before joining Team Bandoh as a full-time driver in 1997, winning the 1997 GT300 championship and continuing to perform well over the next two years, finishing second overall in 1998 and third overall in 1999.

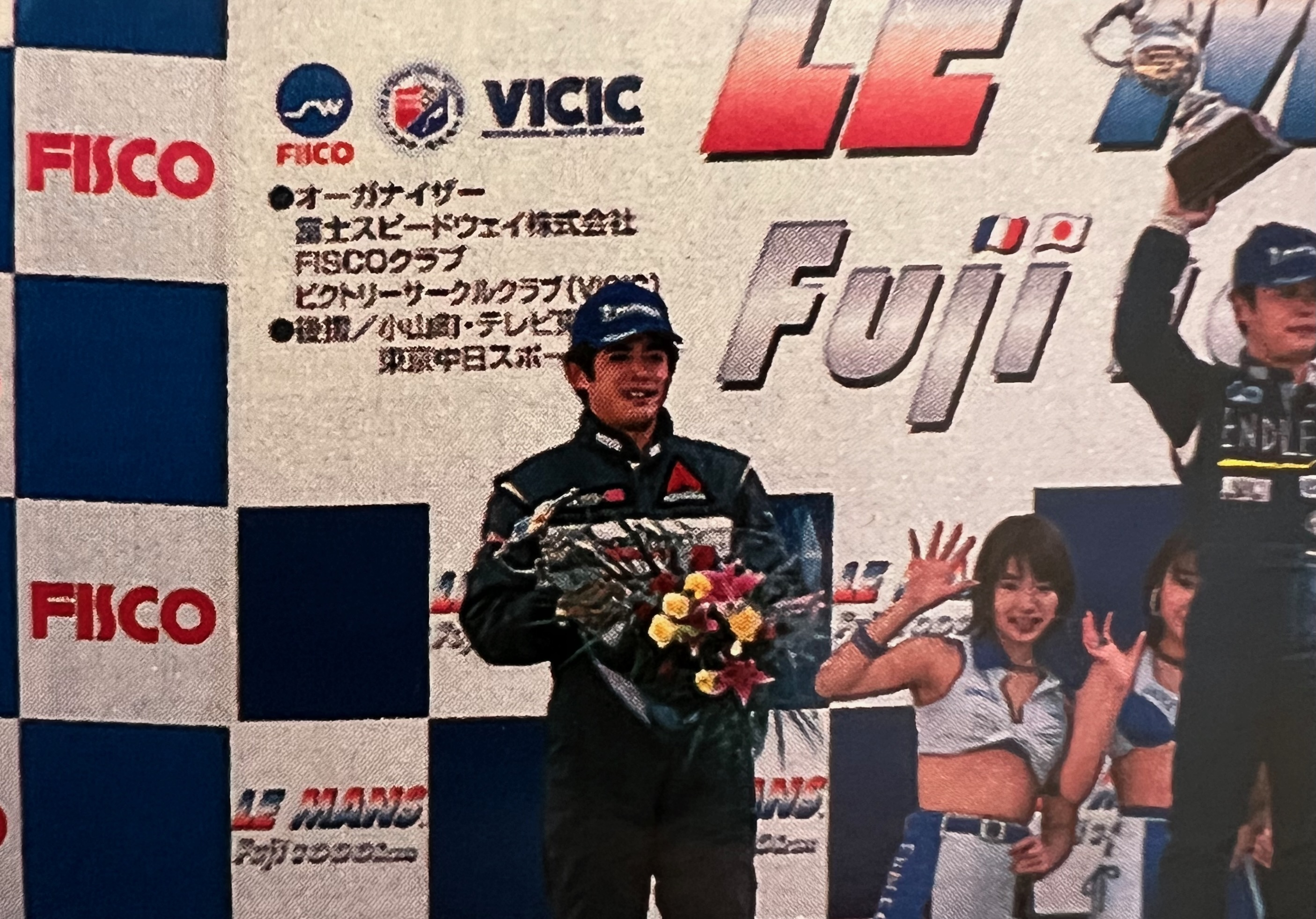
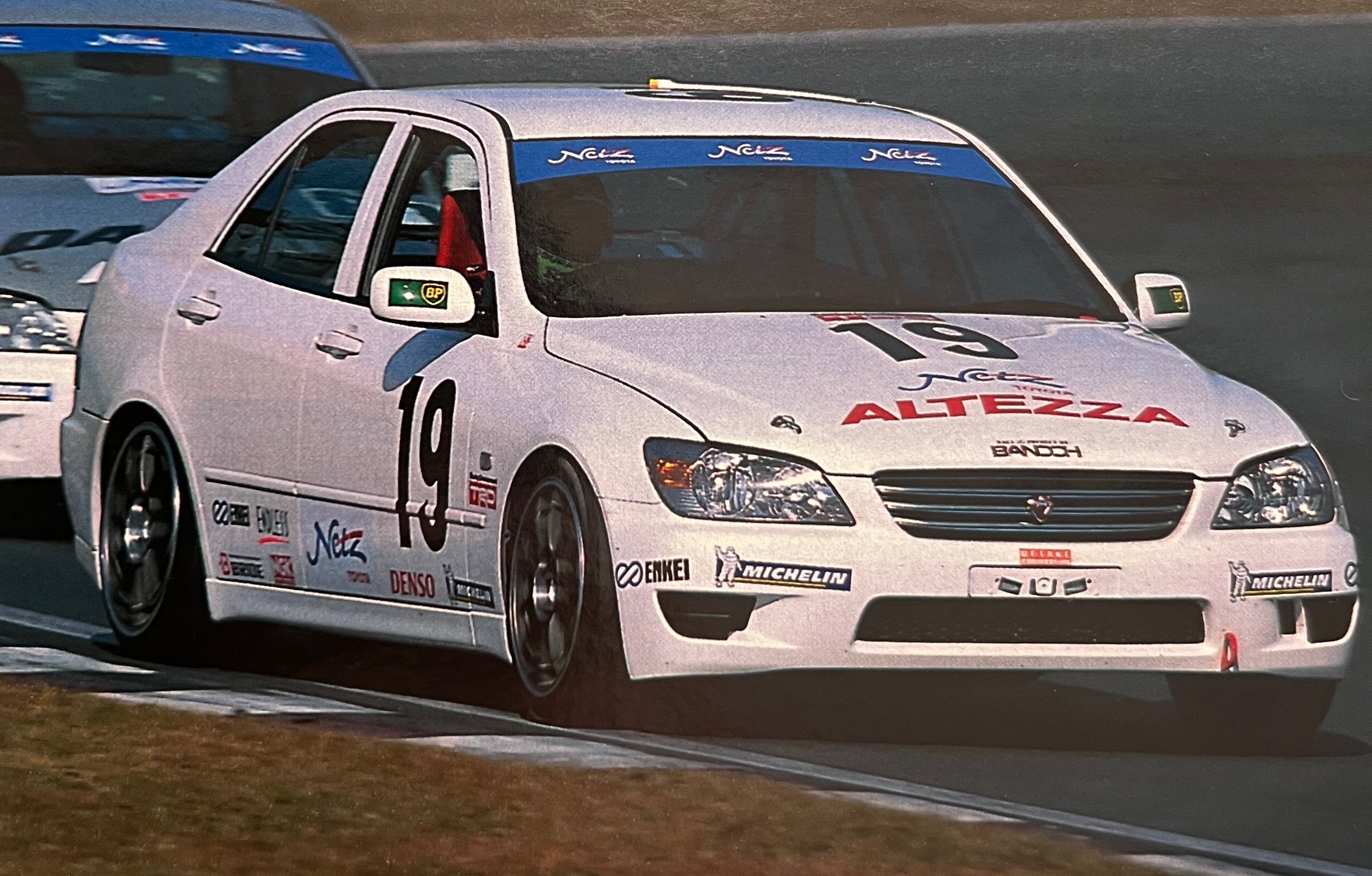
Orido wins 2nd place in the Altezza one-make series at Fuji Speedway in 2000

Orido continued to occasionally compete in One-make racing series, even amid discussions of banning drivers who had won points in the Japanese Touring Car Championship races from competing in the series. Despite this he participated in the commemorative Altezza (Lexus IS) one-make race at Fuji Speedway on May 3, 2000, driving a SXE10 RS200 Z Edition for team TOM'S and Uetake Racing and finishing 2nd overall.

==== 2000–2001: Moving up to GT500 ====
In 2000, Orido moved up to GT500, racing for Team Tsuchiya Engineering in the Toyota Supra alongside Mitsuhiro Kinoshita. Though he was consistently finishing in the points, his performance in the GT500 class was not as impressive as his early GT300 career, his highest finish a seventh place in the sixth round at Mine. The pair ended the season with only 11 points, placing them 18th overall.

2001 offered more of the same for Orido along with his new partner Seiji Ara, as the Team Tsuchiya's Toyota Supra was struggling for pace compared to the other Toyota teams. Their highest finish of the season was two seventh-place finishes at Twin Ring Motegi and Suzuka, while the team was unable to qualify for the race at Fuji. Team Tsuchiya ended the season with 11 points once more, but ranked 19th overall.

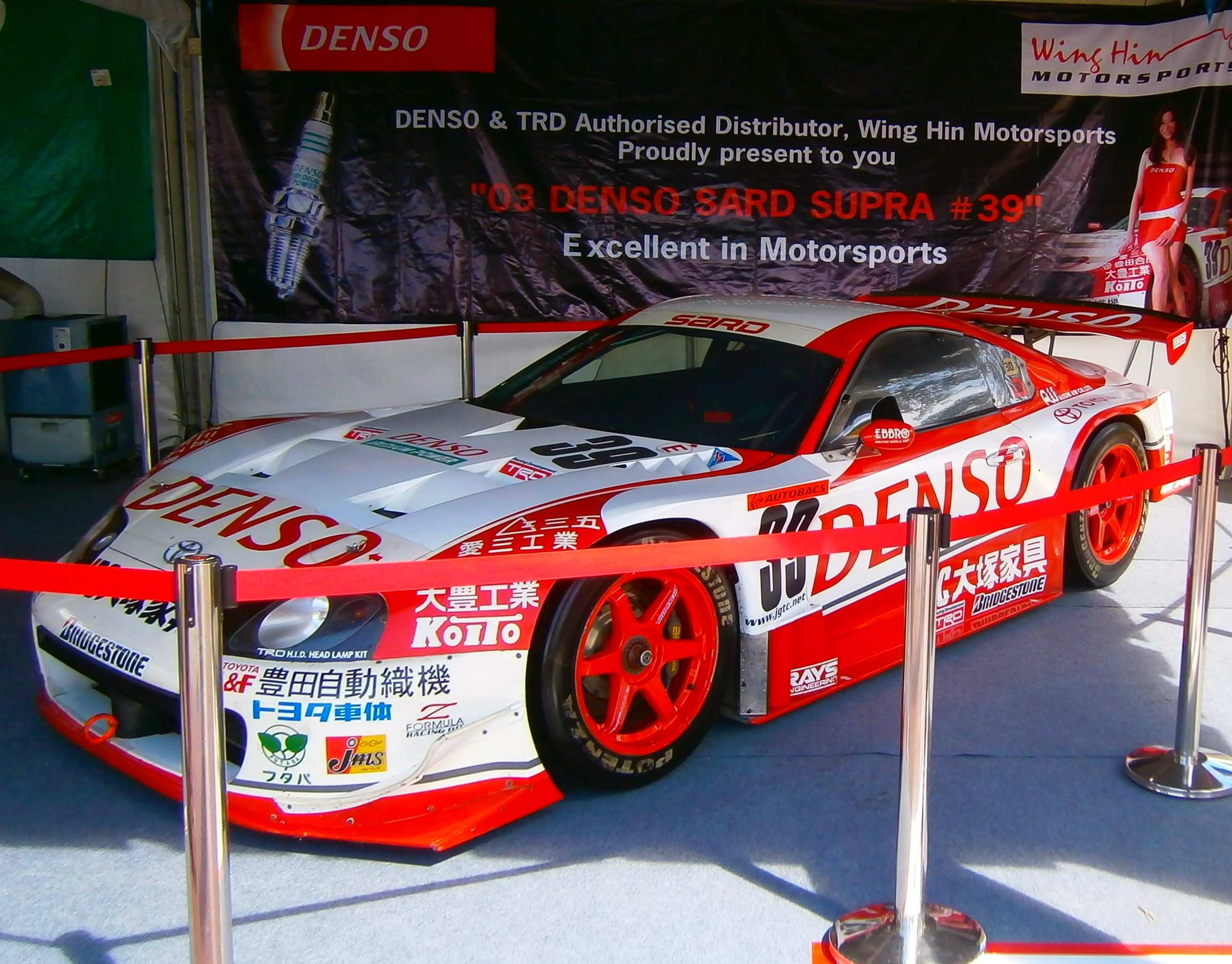
Orido's 2003 DENSO SARD Supra GT500

==== 2002–2003: Finding Success in GT500 ====
At the first round of the 2002 season at TI Circuit Aida, Orido finished third for Team SARD along with French driver Jérémie Dufour, this was Orido's first podium finish in GT500, and although they suffered retirements at the first Fuji race and Sepang and finishing outside the points in Sugo and the second Fuji race, Orido still finished in the points at the last three races to amass 33 points, ending the season 14th overall, Team SARD beating out Orido's former team, Team Tsuchiya and Team KRAFT in the standings.

Orido's best GT500 season came the following year with German driver Dominik Schwager as his new partner. Team SARD started off the season inconsistently, as they weren't able to score points at round 1 at TI Circuit and round 3 at Sugo, but managed to place second in rounds 2 and 4, both of which were held at the Fuji Speedway races, The team carried on their good form by finishing seventh in the next two rounds at Fuji and Motegi, and scoring their first GT500 victory at Autopolis, before ending the season with a 9th-place finish at Suzuka. Orido and Team SARD ended the season with 57 points, sixth overall and third among the Toyota teams.

==== 2004: Return to Team Tsuchiya ====
Orido returned to Team Tsuchiya in 2004, with Schwagger also making the move to partner Orido once more for the season, their ADVAN Toyota Supra being the only Toyota team using Yokohama tires. In a season dominated by the Nissan's new Fairlady Z GT500 car, Orido and Schwagger still managed to score podium finishes at Sugo and Autopolis, but the ADVAN Supra's pace was inconsistent, ending the season with only 31 points and 12th overall, the lowest out of all the Toyota teams.

=== Super GT ===
==== 2005–2007: Inconsistent Years ====
When the JGTC formally changed its name to Super GT In 2005, Orido and the ADVAN team started the season by winning the first race at Okayama, but like the previous season, the Yokohama team was struggling to be consistent in its pace, and while the other Toyota teams were scoring consistent points finishes, the ADVAN Supra only managed to finish in the points again at Sugo. Although the team finished with fewer points than the previous season at only 26 points and 13th overall, the team still finished ahead of the Denso SARD Supra in the standings.

The 2006 season saw Toyota introducing their new GT500 machine, the Lexus SC430 GT500, to the competition. With new codriver Takeshi Tsuchiya, Orido contested the season with the new Lexus, but the Team Tsuchiya's car paled in comparison to rival Toyota team TOM's, as Orido and Tsuchiya could only manage to get low scoring points finishes en route to 19th place overall, outperforming only the continually declining Team SARD amongst the Toyota teams in the standings.

In 2007, Orido and Tsuchiya managed to finish more races in the points compared to the previous year, but with the dominating performance put on by the Autobacs Racing Team Aguri NSX and consistently positive performances by other Toyota teams, Team Tsuchiya could only manage to get 20 points to end the season 17th overall, ranking fourth out of six Toyota teams, beating only Team SARD and Team KRAFT that showed lackluster form compared to the previous season.

==== 2008–2010: Return to Bandoh and Second GT300 Title ====
In 2008, Orido returned to the GT300 class, racing once again for Racing Project Bandoh, who debuted their new Lexus IS350 GT300 car mid-season. The team struggled with the performance of the new cars in its first few races, but Orido managed to score a race victory at Twin Ring Motegi, following up with two points finishes in the last two races, ending his return season 12th overall.

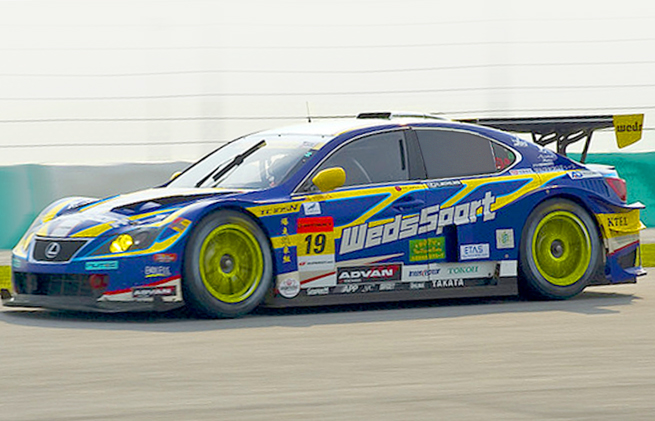
Orido's GT300 championship winning #19 Lexus IS 350 in 2009

The 2009 season saw Orido performing consistently as he did in his early years, scoring a race victory in the first round at Okayama, then following it up with consistent points finishes with podiums at Sepang and Autopolis, fighting against the JIMGAINER Ferrari F430 up until the final race at Motegi, where Orido and teammate Tatsuya Kataoka finished third to win the 2009 GT300 title, Orido's second GT300 championship title.

However, in 2010, Orido and the Bandoh Racing Project team endured a tough title defense season, as while they started the season strong, finishing on the podium at the first round in Suzuka, their three-year old Lexus IS350 struggled for pace as the season went on, unable to close the gap to the faster leaders, ultimately ending the season with only 33 points, eighth overall.

==== 2011–2017: Driving for JLOC ====
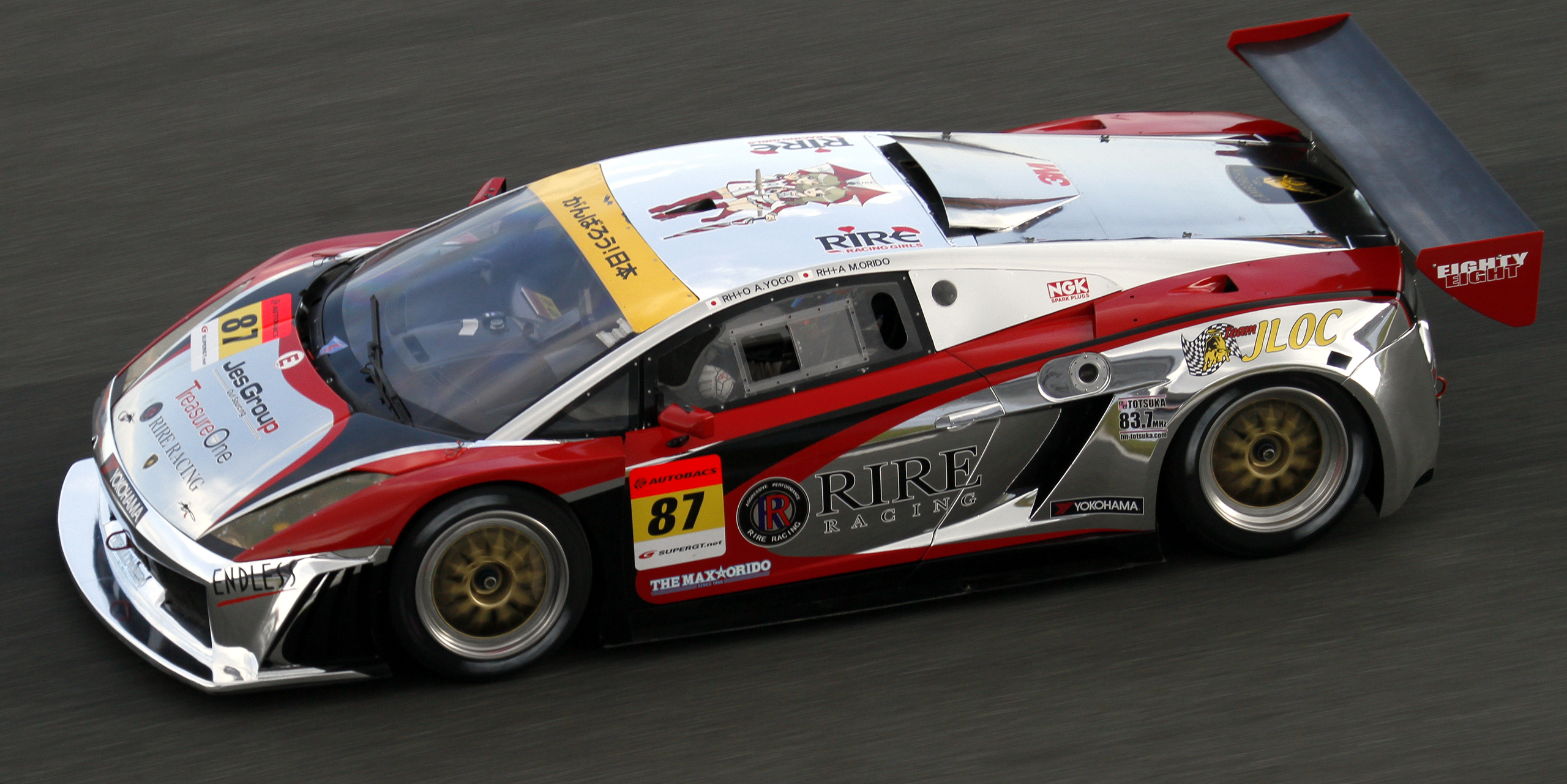
Orido driving the JLOC Gallardo RG-3 in 2011 at Fuji Speedway

When Bandoh Racing Project announced its intention to compete with a Lexus SC430 in the GT500 class the following year, Orido moved to Team JLOC, a team known for their Lamborghini race cars in Super GT, Orido was put in the #87 Gallardo RG-3 with Atsushi Yogo. In his first season with his new team, Orido finished on the podium twice, but finished outside the points in five races out of eight, ending the season with just 26 points and 11th overall.

In 2012, the team endured a rough start, with Orido's car finishing outside the points in the first race at Okayama, then retiring on the next two races at Fuji and Sepang, but bouncing back to finish 3rd in the next two races at Sugo and Suzuka, and ending the season with another third-place finish at Twin Ring Motegi, placing 8th overall despite the dreadful start to the season.

The 2013 season for Orido was a disappointing one, with two retirements at Okayama and Fuji, and only three points scoring finishes at Sepang, Suzuka and Motegi. Orido ended the season with 22 points and 14th overall.

2014 showed further disappointing performances, with the Lamborghini Gallardos lacking pace compared to most of the GT300 field, with one retirement at Fuji and finishes outside the points for six of eight races, the only positive performance came in the fifth round in Sugo, where a clever tire strategy by the JLOC team brought Orido's #88 MANEPA Lamborghini its first race victory. The 20 points brought by the Sugo race win were the only points Orido scored during the 2014 season, ranking him 16th overall by the end of the season.

In 2015, Orido suffered three retirements but finished in the points for all but one of the other races in that season. He finished in 14th place with 26 points.

For the 2016 season, JLOC transitioned to the Lamborghini Huracan GT3, and Orido performed better than recent seasons with one podium finish and five points finishes. Orido ended the season in 11th place with 30 points. Orido had a similar result for the 2017 season, with one podium finish and a season finish of tenth place with 28 points.

==== 2018–Present: Sabbatical and struggles at apr ====
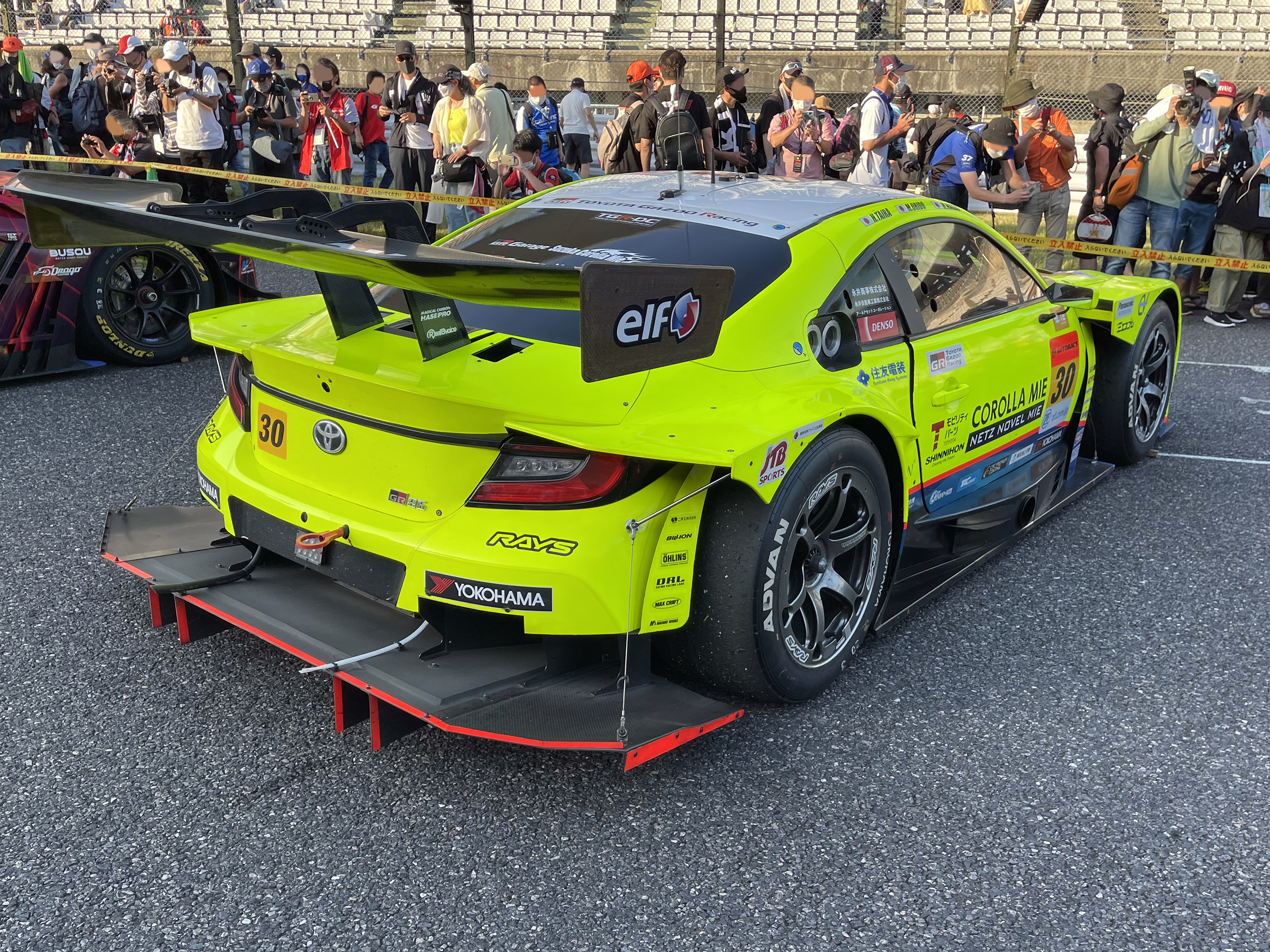
The #30 apr GR86 GT300 raced by Orido at the 2022 Suzuka 300km.

For the 2018 season, Orido announced he would be departing Team JLOC and taking a sabbatical from Super GT. He returned to Team WedsSport Bandoh as an executive advisor for the 2018 season. Orido replaced Kota Sasaki at Team apr Racing near the end of the 2018 season from Round 6 at Sugo onwards, but scored no points.

In 2019, Orido returned to race in Super GT for a full season with Team apr Racing driving the Toyota Prius PHV GR Sport GT300 alongside Hiroaki Nagai.

From 2019 to 2021, Orido had very little success in the GT300 field with apr Racing, with no points in 2019, one point and 29th place in 2020, and eight points and 21st place in 2021.

In 2022, apr Racing switched to the Toyota GR86 GT300, and Orido improved to winning one podium and one points finish. He scored 14 points overall and finished in 19th place for the season.

=== 24 Hours of Le Mans ===
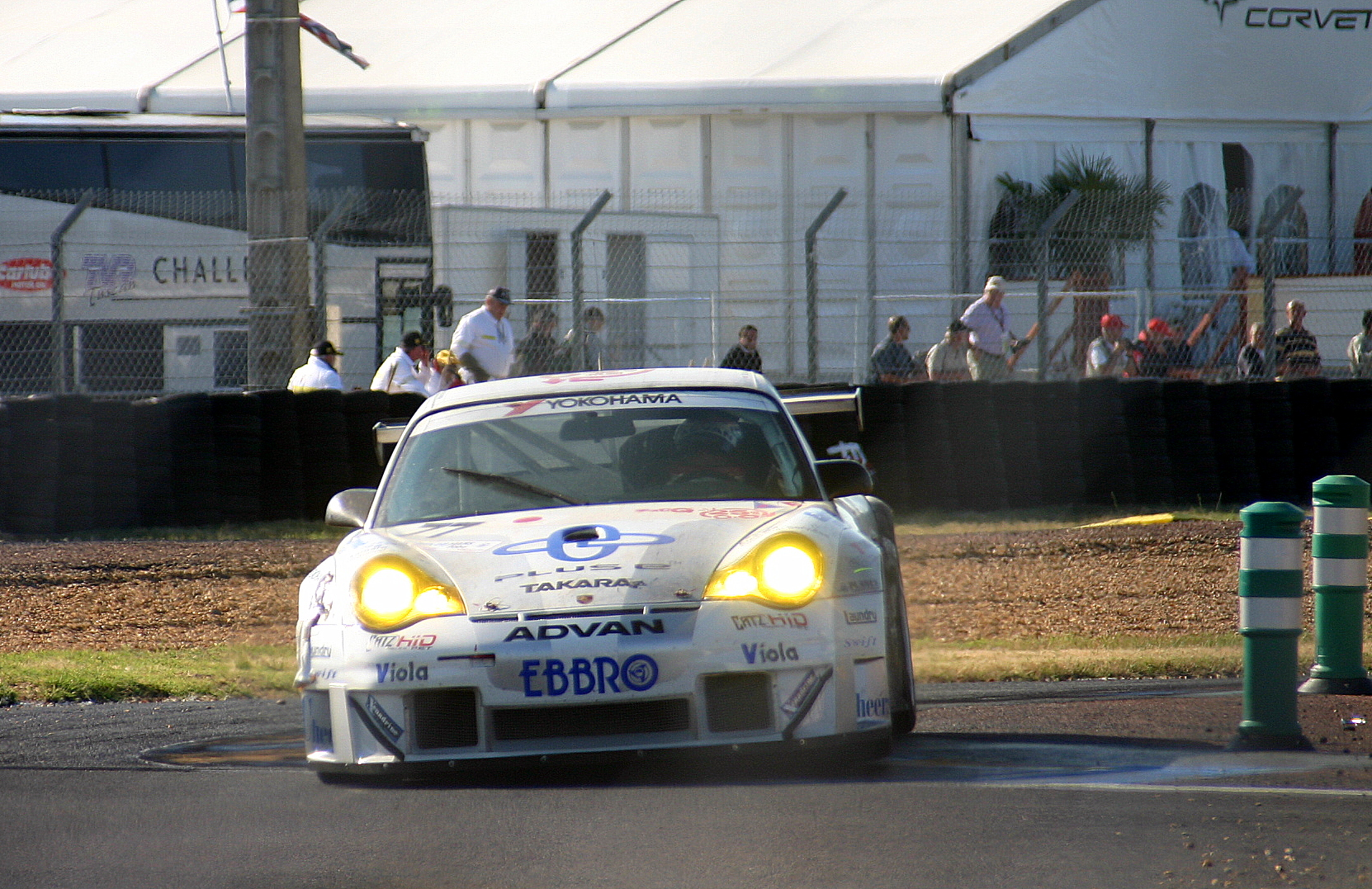
Orido's #77 Porsche 911 GT3 RSR racing in the 2004 24 Hours of Le Mans.

In 2004, Orido joined the Choro-Q Racing Team to race in the 24 Hours of Le Mans driving a Porsche 911 GT3 RSR (996). The team finished second place in the GT class and 12th place overall.

=== Le Mans Endurance Series ===
In the Le Mans Endurance Series for 2004 Orido raced for Choro-Q Racing, ultimately finishing in 5th place for the GT class.

=== Drifting ===
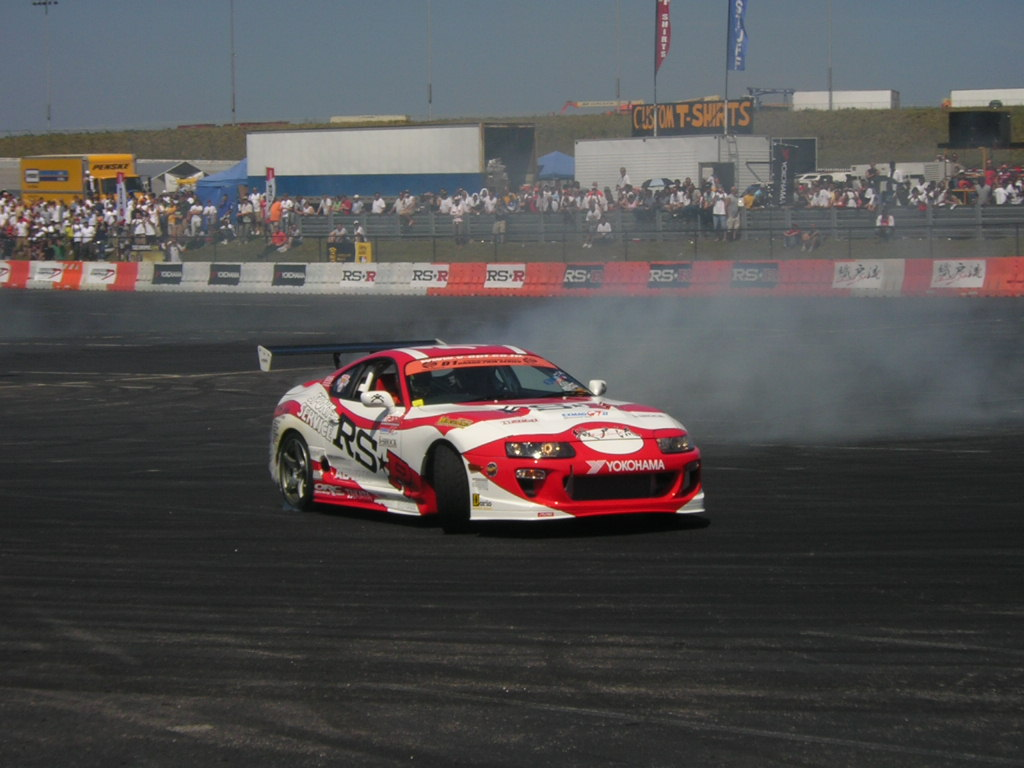
Orido drifting a Toyota Supra

==== D1 Grand Prix ====
As one of the first judges of the D1 Grand Prix since 2001, Orido entered the 2005 championship as a driver for Team RS-R, driving a Toyota Supra JZA80. He won the third round and finished the season in 12th place.

Orido competed again in 2009 driving a Toyota Aristo JZS161, and finished in 15th place overall. He had a podium finish at round 4 in 2010 and finished in 8th place overall, driving a Toyota Supra JZA80.

In 2011, Orido won the third round of the championship, and finished the season in 13th place.

Orido finished in 16th place in 2012 and 2013, with a podium finish at round 4 in 2013. He finished in 13th place in 2014.

Orido won the fourh round in 2015 at Ebisu, and finished the season in 23rd place after only competing in two rounds.

==== Formula Drift ====
Orido has competed in the Formula Drift series for individual rounds, and regularly in Formula Drift Asia.

Orido joined frequent collaborator Team RS-R in the Formula D Asia series from 2011 onwards.

=== World Touring Car Championship ===
Orido raced in the 2008 FIA World Touring Car Championship for Rounds 10-12, driving the Chevrolet Lancetti for Team Chevrolet RML, finishing with two points in 19th place overall.

=== Malaysia Merdeka Endurance Race ===
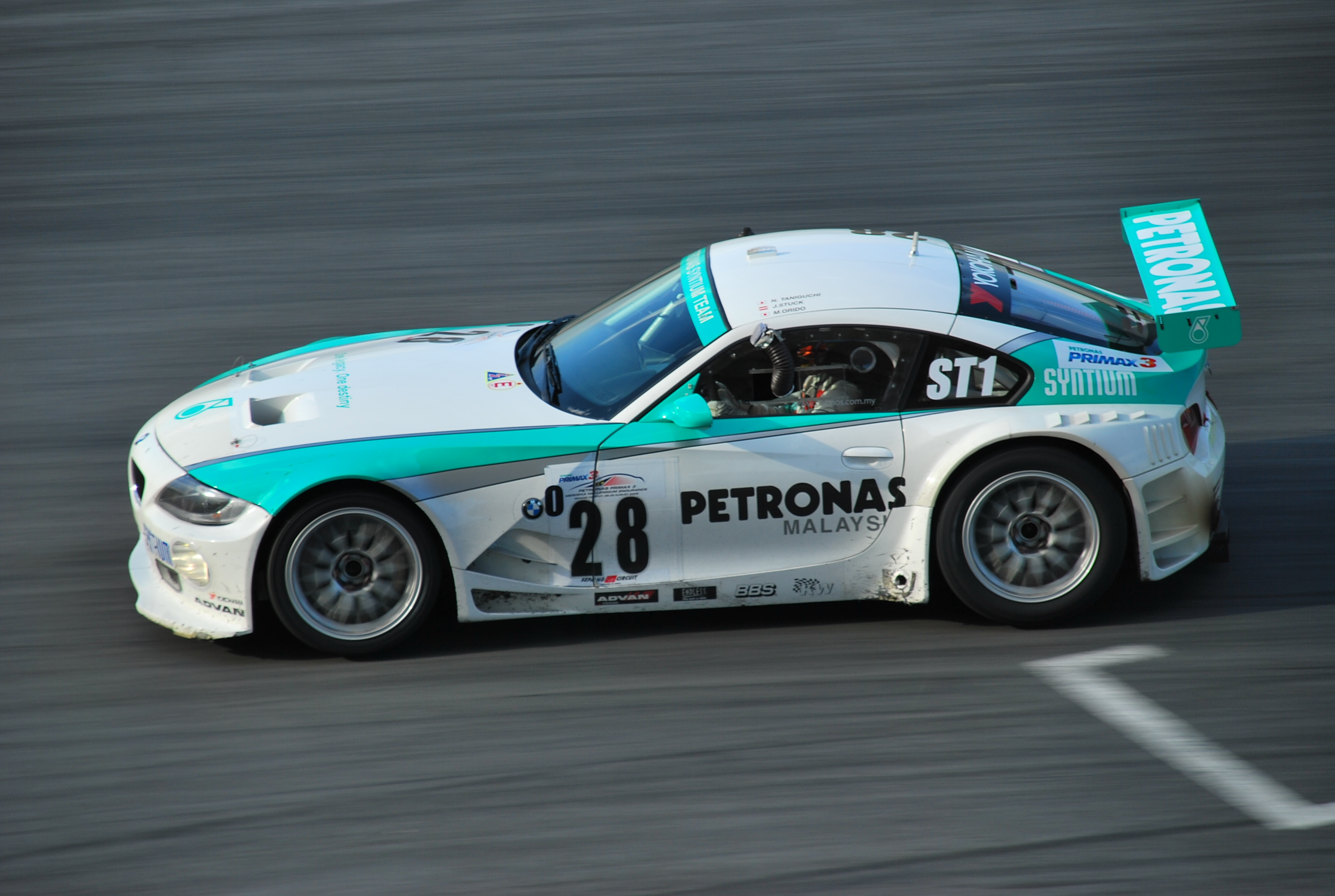
Z4 M Coupé raced by Orido at the 2008 Malaysia Merdeka Endurance Race

In the 2009 Malaysia Merdeka Endurance Race, Orido won the overall victory with the Petronas Syntium Team driving a BMW Z4 M Coupé, finishing in first place after 306 laps.

=== 24H Series ===
In 2010, Orido joined the Petronas Syntium team in the 24H Series, driving a BMW Z4 M Coupé in the A5 class. The team finished third in the A5 class at the 2010 Dubai 24 Hour.

Orido raced with Team JLOC in the 2012 and 2013 Dubai 24 Hour. In the A6 class, he finished in 25th in 2012, and fifth in 2013.

=== Super Taikyu ===
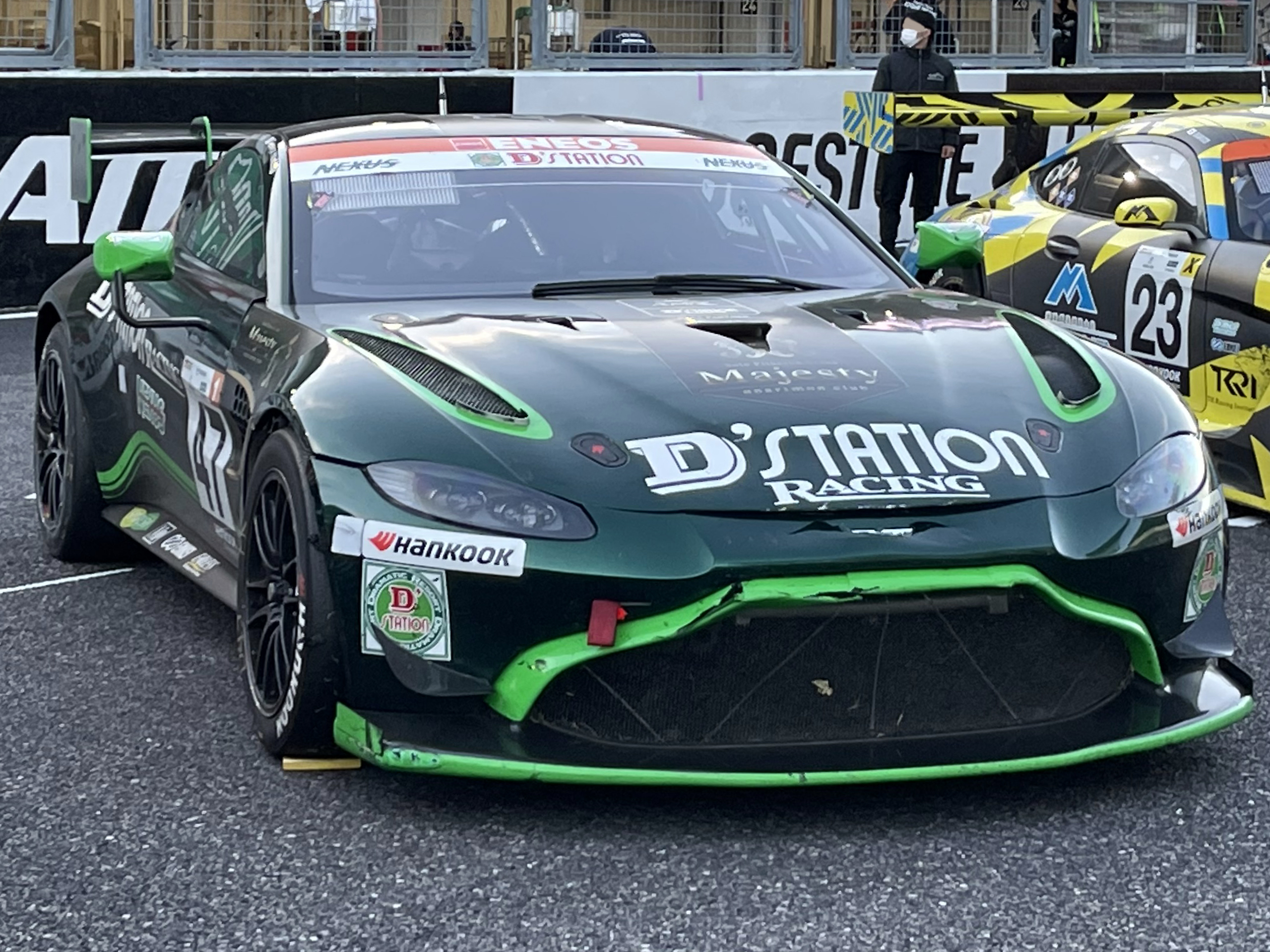
Orido's #47 Aston Martin Vantage GT8R at Suzuka in 2022

Since 2018, Orido has raced in the Super Taikyu Series for D'station Racing. With the team in 2018 and 2019, he won back-to-back ST-1 class championships driving a Porsche 911 GT3 Cup. The team finished first in their class for four races in 2018 and five races in 2019.

In 2020, he moved to the ST-Z class, driving the Aston Martin Vantage GT4. The team finished in second place for the class, with one win and three podiums. He finished with a class second place again in 2021, with two wins and four podiums.

In 2022, Orido moved back to the ST-1 class, driving the Aston Martin Vantage GT8R, where he finished in second place for the class, with two wins and six podiums. The team finished second in the class for the 2023 season as well, with two wins and four podium finishes.

=== GT World Challenge Asia ===
In 2023, Orido participated in the GT World Challenge Asia championship series, driving a BMW M4 GT4 for the YZ Racing with Studie Team alongside Masaki Kano. Orido and the team scored six race wins in the 2023 championship in the GT4 class. At Round 5 in Okayama, Orido made headlines after exiting his M4 GT4 and pushing it across the finish line, after running out of fuel on the final corner of the race which he had been leading until that point.

Orido and the YZ Racing with Studie team went on to win the 2023 GT4 class championship, as well as the Japan Cup title for the 2023 season.

== Outside racing ==
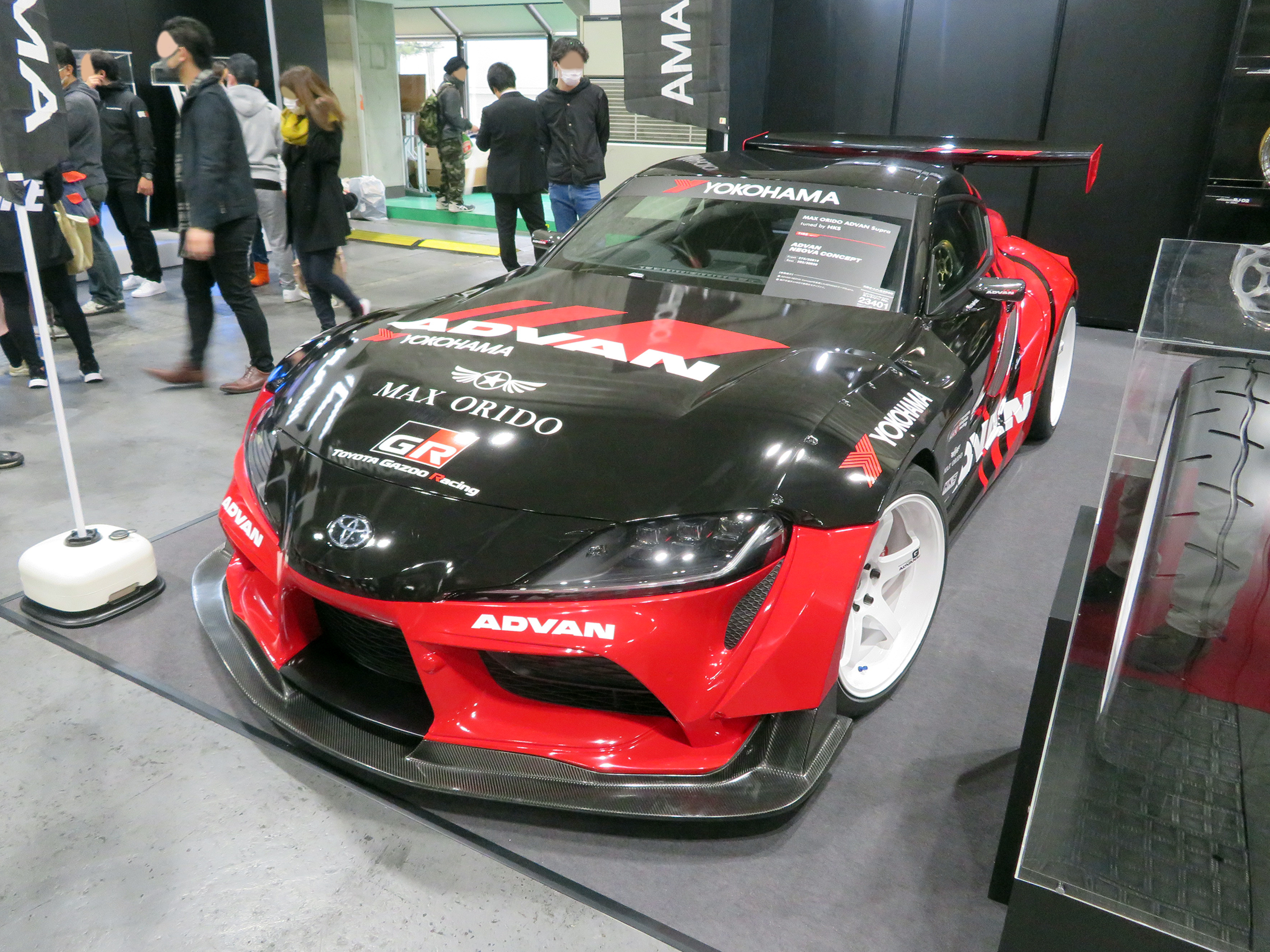
Fifth-generation Supra built by Orido and HKS

Outside his racing activities, Orido currently teaches safety driving at NATS (Nihon Automobile Technical High School).

Orido is also famous for being one of the three main hosts of the Hot Version segments of the long running Best Motoring DVD series, his co-hosts fellow racing drivers Nobuteru Taniguchi and Keiichi Tsuchiya.

In 2013, Orido opened the 130R Yokohama professional driving simulator facility, where he also acts as a coach for young drivers who want to improve their driving skills with the simulator. The 130R Yokohama facility is frequented by fellow racing driver Juichi Wakisaka and World Time Attack driver Tomohiko "Under" Suzuki and was also featured in one of the Video Option DVDs.

Orido owns the RIDOX brand that sells custom aero parts for the fourth-generation Toyota Supra, with the parts designed in partnership with Varis and promoted using his personal time attack Toyota Supra. Orido's RIDOX Supra is regarded as one of the best looking Supras in the tuning community and has been featured in several Hot Version segments, and video games, most notably as a rival car named Orimabu (a reference to Orido's name) in Genki's Tokyo Xtreme Racer series of video games.

In 2018, Orido launched the AKEa brand which specializes in body kits and other car exterior parts, as his own personal line of aero parts for modern cars. He has released "Max Orido x AKEa" kits for the first- and second-generation Toyota 86 and fifth-generation Toyota Supra. These kits emphasize a casual and timeless styling to complement the car's original design, and are offered unpainted, painted, or in carbon fiber.

== Racing record ==
=== Complete Super GT results ===
Year	Team	Car	Class	1	2	3	4	5	6	7	8	9	DC	Points
1996	Team JUN	Nissan Skyline GT-R	GT500	SUZ	FUJ	SEN	FUJ; 13						NC	0
1996	Team Taisan Jr.	Toyota MR2	GT300					SUG; 4	MIN				19th	10
1997	RS★R racing with BANDOH	Nissan Silvia	GT300	SUZ; 1	FUJ; 2	SEN; 2	FUJ; 3	MIN; 1	SUG; 5				1st	90
1998	RACING PROJECT BANDOH	Toyota Celica	GT300	SUZ	FUJ	SEN	FUJ; 7	MOT; 2	MIN; 2	SUG; 3			2nd	46
1999	RACING PROJECT BANDOH	Toyota Celica	GT300	SUZ; 1	FUJ; 2	SUG; Ret	MIN; 3	FUJ; Ret	TAI; 5	MOT; 2			3rd	70
2000	ENDLESS + Tsuchiya Engineering	Toyota Supra	GT500	MOT; 13	FUJ; 10	SUG; 14	FUJ; 8	TAI; 8	MIN; 7	SUZ; 13			18th	11
2001	Tsuchiya Engineering	Toyota Supra	GT500	TAI; 9	FUJ; 11	SUG; 11	FUJ; DNQ	MOT; 7	SUZ; 7	MIN; 10			19th	11
2002	Toyota TEAM SARD	Toyota Supra	GT500	TAI; 3	FUJ; Ret	SUG; 12	SEP; Ret	FUJ; 15	MOT; 5	MIN; 7	SUZ; 5		14th	33
2003	Toyota TEAM SARD	Toyota Supra	GT500	TAI; 14	FUJ; 2	SUG; 14	FUJ; 2	FUJ; 7	MOT; 7	AUT; 1	SUZ; 9		6th	57
2004	Team Advan - Tsuchiya	Toyota Supra	GT500	TAI; 14	SUG; 2	SEP; Ret	TOK; 13	MOT; 12	AUT; 3	SUZ; 10			12th	31
2005	Team Advan - Tsuchiya	Toyota Supra	GT500	OKA; 1	FUJ; 14	SEP; 15	SUG; 9	MOT; 15	FUJ; Ret	AUT; Ret	SUZ; 14		13th	26
2006	Toyota Team Tsuchiya	Lexus SC430	GT500	SUZ; 8	OKA; 9	FUJ; 6	SUG; 10	SUG; 12	SUZ; Ret	MOT; 12	AUT; 15	FUJ; 9	19th	18
2007	Toyota Team Tsuchiya	Lexus SC430	GT500	SUZ; 9	OKA; 6	FUJ; Ret	SEP; 5	SUG; 8	SUZ; Ret	MOT; 8	AUT; 10	FUJ; 12	17th	20
2008	RACING PROJECT BANDOH	Toyota Celica	GT300	SUZ; 7	OKA; Ret								12th	40
2008	RACING PROJECT BANDOH	Lexus IS350	GT300			FUJ; 9	SEP; Ret	SUG; 15	SUZ; 19	MOT; 1	AUT; 10	FUJ; 5	12th	40
2009	RACING PROJECT BANDOH	Lexus IS350	GT300	OKA; 1	SUZ; 8	FUJ; 5	SEP; 2	SUG; 5	SUZ; 6	FUJ; 4	AUT; 3	MOT; 3	1st	85
2010	RACING PROJECT BANDOH	Lexus IS350	GT300	SUZ; 3	OKA; 14	FUJ; 4	SEP; 9	SUG; Ret	SUZ; 4	FUJ; C	MOT; 7		8th	33
2011	JLOC	Lamborghini Gallardo RG-3	GT300	OKA; 3	FUJ; 14	SEP; 7	SUG; 16	SUZ; 3	FUJ; 19	AUT; 16	MOT; 16		11th	26
2012	JLOC	Lamborghini Gallardo GT3	GT300	OKA; 17	FUJ; Ret	SEP; Ret	SUG; 3	SUZ; 3	FUJ; Ret	AUT; 7	MOT; 3		8th	39
2013	JLOC	Lamborghini Gallardo GT3	GT300	OKA; Ret	FUJ; 12	SEP; 5	SUG; 18	SUZ; 4	FUJ; Ret	FSW	AUT; 12	MOT; 5	14th	22
2014	JLOC	Lamborghini Gallardo GT3	GT300	OKA; 11	FUJ; Ret	AUT; 11	SUG; 1	FUJ; 21	SUZ; 13	BUR; 18	MOT; 11		16th	20
2015	JLOC	Lamborghini Gallardo GT3	GT300	OKA; Ret	FUJ; Ret	BUR; 17	FUJ; 7	SUZ; 4	SUG; 4	AUT; Ret	MOT; 7		14th	26
2016	JLOC	Lamborghini Huracán GT3	GT300	OKA; 9	FUJ; 25	SUG; 6	FUJ; 4	SUZ; 9	BUR; 10	MOT; 3	MOT ret		11th	30
2017	JLOC	Lamborghini Huracán GT3	GT300	OKA; 19	FUJ; 25	AUT; 16	SUG; Ret	FUJ; 7	SUZ; 2	BUR; 5	MOT; Ret		10th	28
2018	apr	Toyota Prius apr GT	GT300	OKA	FUJ	SUZ	BUR	FUJ; Ret	SUG; 16	AUT; 26	MOT; 21		NC	0
2019	apr	Toyota GR Sport Prius PHV apr GT	GT300	OKA; Ret	FUJ; 21	SUZ; 21	BUR; 22	FUJ; 25	AUT; Ret	SUG; 25	MOT; 21		NC	0
2020	apr	Toyota GR Sport Prius PHV apr GT	GT300	FUJ; 21	FUJ; 17	SUZ; Ret	MOT; 24	FUJ; 20	AUT; 20	SUZ; 10	MOT; 13		29th	1
2021	apr	Toyota GR Sport Prius PHV apr GT	GT300	OKA; Ret	FUJ; 18	MOT; 8	SUZ; 6	SUG; 20	AUT; 23	MOT; 16	FUJ; 16		21st	8
2022	apr	Toyota GR86	GT300	OKA; 13	FUJ; 18	SUZ; 8	FUJ; 15	SUZ; 3	SUG; 20	AUT; 17	MOT; Ret		19th	14
2023	apr	Toyota GR86	GT300	OKA; 13	FUJ; 18	SUZ; 9	FUJ; 13	SUZ; 17	SUG; Ret	AUT; 16	MOT; 23		24th	2
2024	apr	Toyota GR86 GT300	GT300	OKA	FUJ; 22	SUZ; 19	FUJ; 18	SUG	AUT; 19	MOT; 19	SUZ; 20		NC	0
2025	apr	Toyota GR86 GT300	GT300	OKA; 20	FUJ; 16	SEP	FS1; 24	FS2; Ret	SUZ; Ret	SUG; 13	AUT; 22	MOT; 23	30th	3
2026	apr	Toyota GR86 GT300	GT300	OKA	FUJ; 21	FUJ	SUZ	SUG	AUT; 19	MOT; Ret	MOT; 25		NC	0

=== Complete 24 Hours of Le Mans Results ===
Year	Team	Co-Drivers	Car	Class	Laps	Position	Class Position
2004	(Japan) ChoroQ Racing Team	(Japan) Haruki Kurosawa (Japan) Kazuyuki Nishizawa	Porsche 911 GT3 RSR	GT	322	12th	2nd

=== D1 Grand Prix Results ===
(key)

Year	Entrant	Car	1	2	3	4	5	6	7	Position	Points
2005	RS*R	Toyota Supra JZA80	IRW; TAN	ODB; 8	SGO; TSU	APS	EBS; 2	FUJ; TSU	TKB	12th	25
2014	DRIVE M7 ADVAN MAX ORIDO RACING	Toyota Toyota ZN6	FUJ; 14	ODB; 5	APS; 23	EBS	EBS	ODB		13th	69

=== GT World Challenge Asia Results ===
Year	Team	Car	Class	1 BUR (Thailand)		2 FUJ (Japan)		3 SUZ (Japan)		4 MOT (Japan)		5 OKA (Japan)		6 SEP (Malaysia)		Position	Points
Year	Team	Car	Class	R1	R2	R1	R2	R1	R2	R1	R2	R1	R2	R1	R2	Position	Points
2023	(Japan) No. 50 YZ Racing with BMW Team Studie	BMW M4 GT4 Gen II	GT4			29	DSQ	30	30	26	28	6	1			1st	162
