= Satoshi Goto =

Japanese voice actor

Satoshi Goto (後藤 哲, Gotō Satoshi, born January 18, 1971) is a Japanese voice actor.

== Anime voice roles ==
- Fantastic Children (2004 TV), Seth
- D.C.S.S. ~Da Capo Second Season~ (2005 TV), Announcer, Dog (ep 3), Male Student
- .hack//Roots (2006 TV), PK (eps 20, 22)
- D.Gray-man (2006 TV), Klack
