= Atsushi Katsumata =

Japanese baseball player (born 2000)

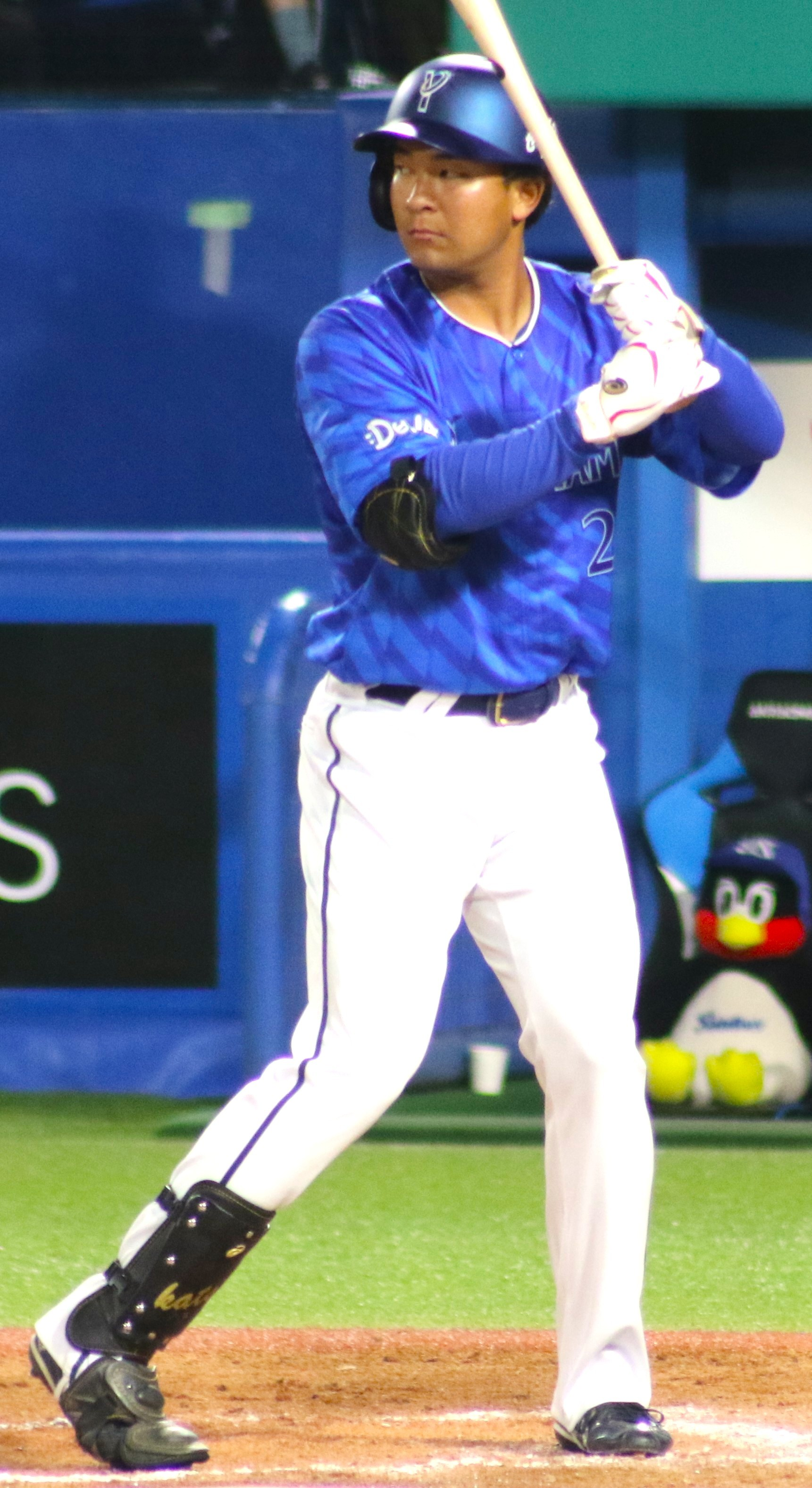
- Katsumata in 2025

Yokohama DeNA BayStars – No. 28
- Outfielder
- Born: May 22, 2000 (age 26); Komae, Tokyo, Japan
- Bats: Left Throws: Right

NPB debut
- May 1, 2025, for the Yokohama DeNA BayStars

Career statistics (through 2025 season)
- Batting average: .333
- Home runs: 0
- RBI: 0

Teams
- Yokohama DeNA BayStars (2019-present)

Atsushi Katsumata (勝又 温史, Katsumata Atsushi; born May 22, 2000 in Komae, Tokyo, Japan) is a professional Japanese baseball player. He is an outfielder for the Yokohama DeNA BayStars of Nippon Professional Baseball (NPB).
