= Studie =

Japanese tuning company specialized for the BMW cars

(Japan) PLUS with BMW M Team Studie
- Founded: 1995
- Folded: 2026
- Team principal(s): (Japan) Yasuaki "Bob" Suzuki
- Current series: GT World Challenge Asia; Intercontinental GT Challenge; Suzuka 1000km
- Former series: Super GT
- Current drivers: (Japan) Seiji Ara (Japan) Tomohide Yamaguchi (Japan) Kizuku Hirota
- Teams' Championships: 1 (SGT, 2011)
- Drivers' Championships: 2 (SGT Taku Bamba, Nobuteru Taniguchi)
- Website: teamstudie.jp

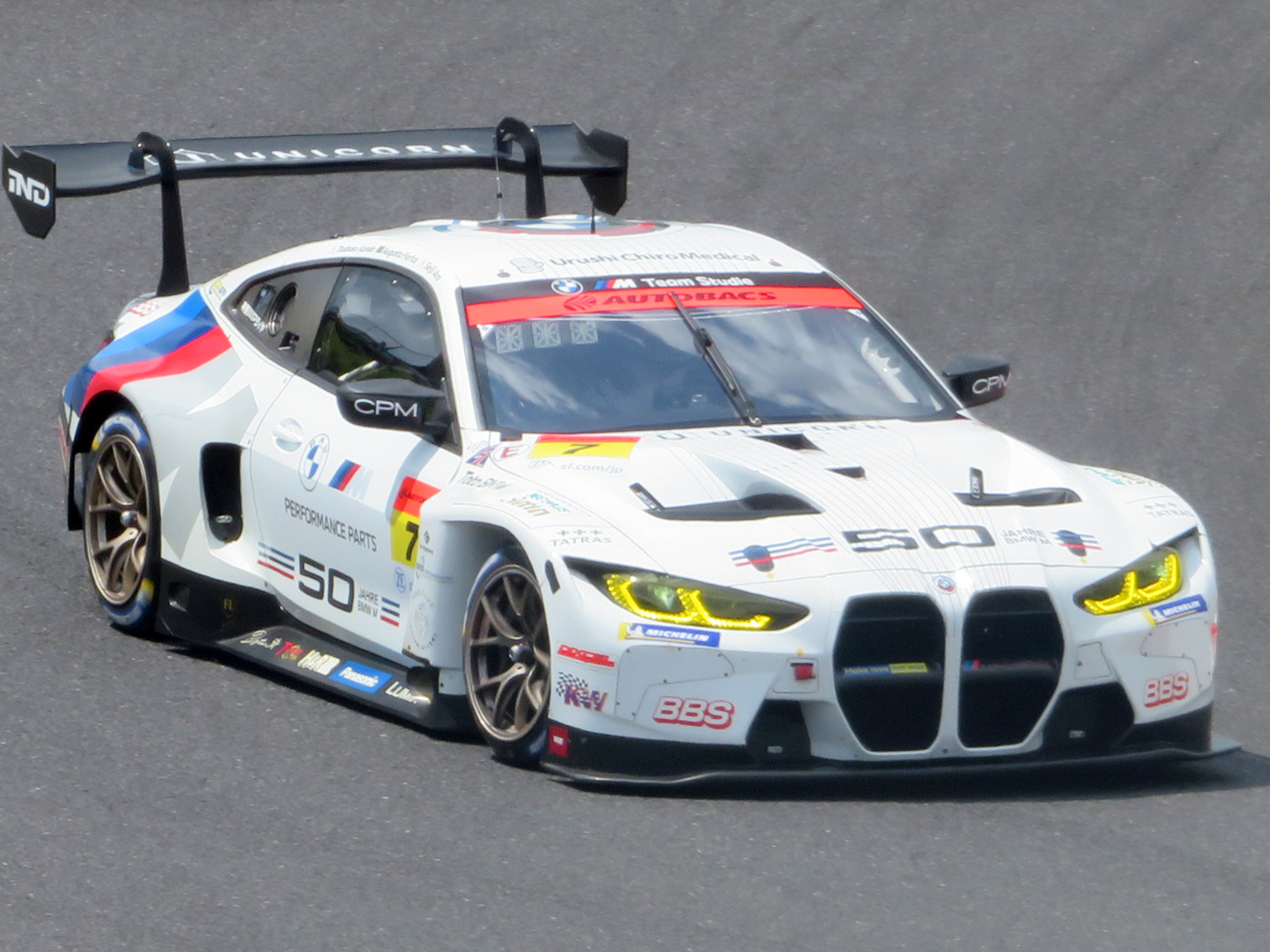
No.7 Studie BMW M4 at 2022 Takanoko no Hotel Suzuka GT 300km

Studie AG is a Japanese tuning company of BMW and a Super GT team which participates in GT300 class. Since 2018 the team also participates in the GT World Challenge Asia.

== History ==
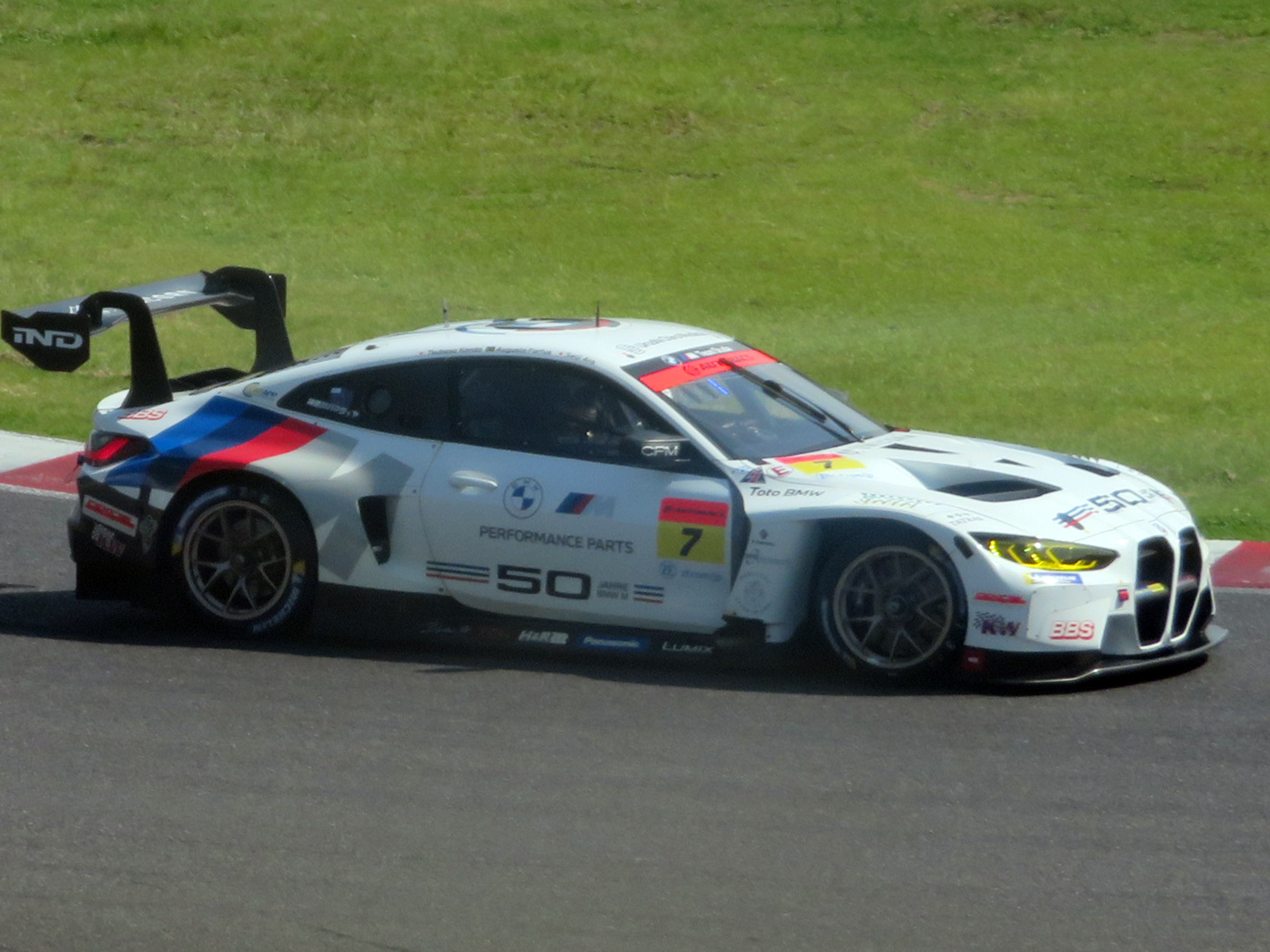
BMW M Team Studie × CRS BMW M4 GT3 at Suzuka

Studie was established in 1995 in Yokohama as a BMW parts dealer and developer. They currently have four branches in Japan. They also provide supports to teams and individuals using BMW cars in motorsports.

== Participation of Super GT Season ==
They started participated in GT300 class in Super GT since 2008 (where they have partnership with Advance Step) with a BMW Z4 (E85), the first BMW car in Super GT history. However, their media coverage mainly comes from their adoption of an Itasha (charactered theme mainly involved with animation or manga characters) theme on their car, which is occasionally seen in Japan's roads but not commonly seen in circuits, even Studie was not the first to do so.

The theme which they use on their car is Vocaloid, a singing synthesizing software developed by Yamaha.

=== 2008 season ===
Studie announced their participation of Super GT in April 2008, using the team name Studie GL@D and Asuda Racing, which they planned to participate the Suzuka, Motegi and Fuji race. to fit the horsepower regulation, they swapped the original engine to a detuned S62B45 used by a BMW M5. Although they received anticipations as being the first BMW car in Super GT (due to Z4 success in lesser Super Taikyu races), the team surprised everyone by their announcement of their "Itasha" adoption, which was unknown until two-weeks prior the race.

They debuted in the practice session in Suzuka 1000km but, force to withdraw from the race due to the violation of fuel part regulation. They also faced an engine problem in Twin Ring Motegi which forced them to be absent in the race. They would successfully start their first race at Fuji, finishing 18 out of 24 cars.

=== 2009 season ===
Studie participated the full 2009 season (other than Malayasia) using the team name Studie GL@D Racing. They mainly uses the same car other than minor modification image changes in the first three races. They skipped the Sepang race as to have time to have a major modification to their car, including swapping their Engine to S65E40 that used by E92 M3 in ALMS. As well as a sequential transmission used by most of the teams.

Their modification proved some success as they successfully get their first driver point in Autopolis race. Even though they showed some impressive results in practices and qualifiers, they also suffered 3 retires in race sessions (out of their 7 starts).

=== 2011 season ===
The team originally planned to participate as AS Studie Racing in 2010 season. But as one of their main partner Advance Step moved to the Super Taikyu series with Team Kyosho, they did not participate that season while their main sponsor Goodsmile Company moved to Porsche's works team COX Japan that season. However, after the end of 2010 season, they decided to return to the series as StudiexGSR, they would later partner with TeamUKYO, a team owned by former F1 driver Ukyo Katayama. They also invited Super GT veteran Nobuteru Taniguchi, which his previous team RE Amemiya withdrew from the series, to their team partnered with Taku Bamba.

They used the BMW Z4 GT3 previously used by Schubert Motorsport, which previously ranked 4th in the 2010 FIA GT3 European Championship season and won the 2011 Dubai 24 hours. They also kept the itasha-style livery, which is similar to the one used in 2009.

Their team ranked 5th and 4th in the season's opening two races, they go on to participate their first event outside Japan in Sepang Circuit, which is a memorial one as they finished from the pole to victory, both are their first time since the team's establishment. They would go on to win the Round 6 at Fuji, and Round 8 in Motegi to conclude the season with a class Champion, both the first overall JGTC/Super GT Champion for the team and as BMW cars.

=== 2016 season ===
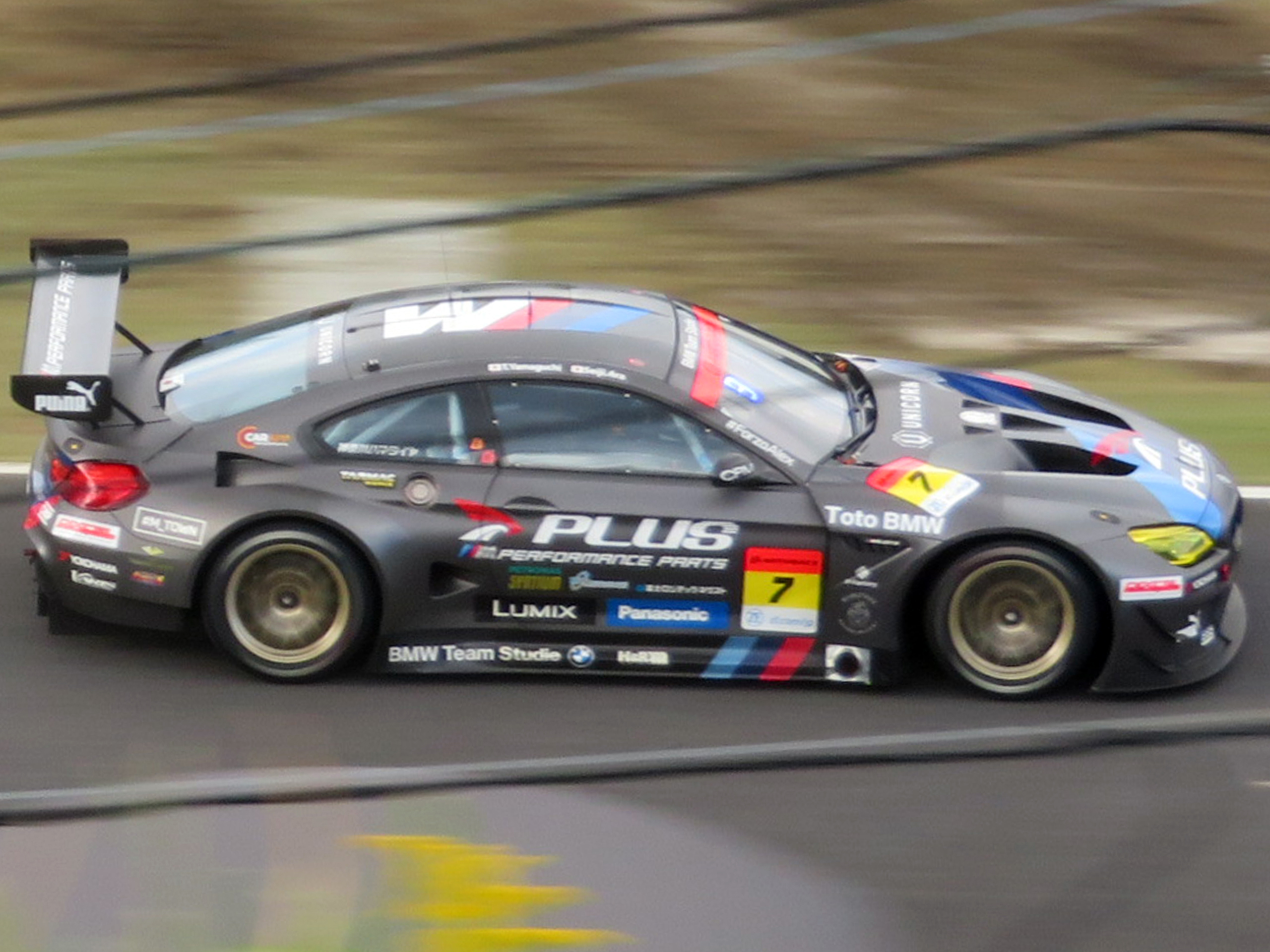
BMW Team Studie × CSL BMW M6 GT3 at Suzuka.

In the announcement of the activity of the Motorsport plan on 3 March 2016, BMW Sports Trophy Team Studie step up to official outsourcing team of BMW making their team name change to BMW Team Studie . The driver of the team there are Jörg Müller who served as the development of the M6 GT3 and Seiji Ara respectively.

In addition this season, sponsors and maintenance also was changed. The sponsor, also in addition to the Steiff that had supported the team as the main sponsor to this, as the "double main sponsor", brand dealing with the popular soap and bath salts to the woman, is Sabon took. The planning of the race queen of the team Sabon of becoming a Quirky unit until "MUSE (Muse)" now named.

They used BMW M6 GT3 to replace the aging Z4 GT3, and they received additional support from BMW in collaboration with BMW Japan this year. And the maintenance garage switch from RS Fine to Eifel Motorsorts.

== Complete Super GT Results ==
(key) (Races in bold indicate pole position) (Races in italics indicate fastest lap)

Year	Car	Tyres	Class	No.	Drivers	1	2	3	4	5	6	7	8	9	Pos	Points
2008	BMW Z4 M Coupe	Y	GT300	808	(Japan) Yasushi Kikuchi (Japan) Shozo Tagahara	SUZ	OKA	FUJ	SEP	SUG	SUZ; WD	MOT; WD	AUT	FUJ; 18	28th	1
2009	BMW Z4 M Coupe	Y	GT300	808	(Japan) Shozo Tagahara (Japan) Yasushi Kikuchi (Japan) Taku Bamba	OKA; 15	SUZ; DNS	FUJ; 17	SEP	SUG; 17	SUZ; Ret	FUJ; Ret	AUT; 10	MOT; Ret	20th	5
2011	BMW Z4 GT3	Y	GT300	4	(Japan) Nobuteru Taniguchi (Japan) Taku Bamba	OKA; 4	FUJ; 5	**SEP**; 1	SUG; 6	SUZ; 5	**FUJ**; 1	AUT; 9	**MOT**; 1		1st	111
2012	BMW Z4 GT3	Y	GT300	0	(Japan) Nobuteru Taniguchi (Japan) Tatsuya Kataoka	OKA; 3	FUJ; 1	SEP; 12	SUG; 7	SUZ; Ret	FUJ; 8	AUT; 5	MOT; 4		4th	73
2012	BMW Z4 GT3	Y	GT300	4	(Japan) Taku Bamba (Japan) Masahiro Sasaki	OKA; 15	FUJ; 11	SEP; 10	SUG; 11	SUZ; 7	FUJ; 11	AUT; 12	MOT; 17		15th	22
2013	BMW Z4 GT3	Y	GT300	4	(Japan) Nobuteru Taniguchi (Japan) Tatsuya Kataoka (Germany) Jörg Müller	OKA; 2	FUJ; 9	SEP; 6	SUG; 15	SUZ; DSQ	FUJ; 1	FUJ	AUT; 1	MOT; 4	3rd	87
2014	BMW Z4 GT3	Y	GT300	7	(Germany) Jörg Müller (Japan) Seiji Ara (Brazil) Augusto Farfus	OKA; 2	FUJ; 4	AUT; 15	SUG; 8	FUJ; 7	SUZ; 3	BUR; 2	MOT; 7		3rd	82
2015	BMW Z4 GT3	Y	GT300	7	(Germany) Jörg Müller (Japan) Seiji Ara	OKA; Ret	FUJ; 6	CHA; 3	FUJ; Ret	SUZ; 2	SUG; 19	AUT; 3	MOT; 9		6th	65
2016	BMW M6 GT3	Y	GT300	7	(Germany) Jörg Müller (Japan) Seiji Ara (Brazil) Augusto Farfus	OKA; 3	FUJ; 24	SUG; 10	FUJ; 20	SUZ; DNS	CHA; 6	MOT; 15	MOT; 12		14th	34
2017	BMW M6 GT3	Y	GT300	7	(Germany) Jörg Müller (Japan) Seiji Ara (Brazil) Augusto Farfus	OKA; 13	FUJ; 7	AUT; 4	SUG; 16	FUJ; 6	SUZ; 11	CHA; 10	MOT; 13		13th	40
2020	BMW M6 GT3	Y	GT300	7	(Japan) Seiji Ara (Japan) Tomohide Yamaguchi	FUJ; 15	FUJ; 22	SUZ; 21	MOT; Ret	FUJ; 9	SUZ; 8	MOT; 19	FUJ; 18		22nd	24
2021	BMW M6 GT3	Y	GT300	7	(Japan) Seiji Ara (Japan) Tomohide Yamaguchi	OKA; 17	FUJ; 20	MOT; 25	SUZ; 25	SUG; 11	AUT; 13	MOT; 15	FUJ; Ret		25th	18
2022	BMW M4 GT3	M	GT300	7	(Japan) Seiji Ara (Brazil) Augusto Farfus (Japan) Tsubasa Kondo	OKA; Ret	FUJ; Ret	**SUZ**; 1	FUJ; 21	SUZ; 12	SUG; 5	AUT; 12	MOT; 9		10th	45
2023	BMW M4 GT3	M	GT300	7	(Japan) Seiji Ara (Canada) Bruno Spengler (Japan) Masataka Yanagida	OKA; 6	FUJ; 13	SUZ; 1	FUJ; 2	SUZ; 16	SUG; 13	AUT; 8	MOT; 12		4th	64
2024	BMW M4 GT3	M	GT300	7	(Japan) Seiji Ara (Germany) Niklas Krütten (Canada) Bruno Spengler	OKA; 3	FUJ; 11	SUZ; 7	FUJ; 7	SUZ; 4	SUG; 4	AUT; 5	MOT; 13		5th	65

^{*} Season still in progress.

== See also ==
- Super GT
- Vocaloid
- Itasha
