= 2011 Super GT Series =

Touring car racing season in Japan

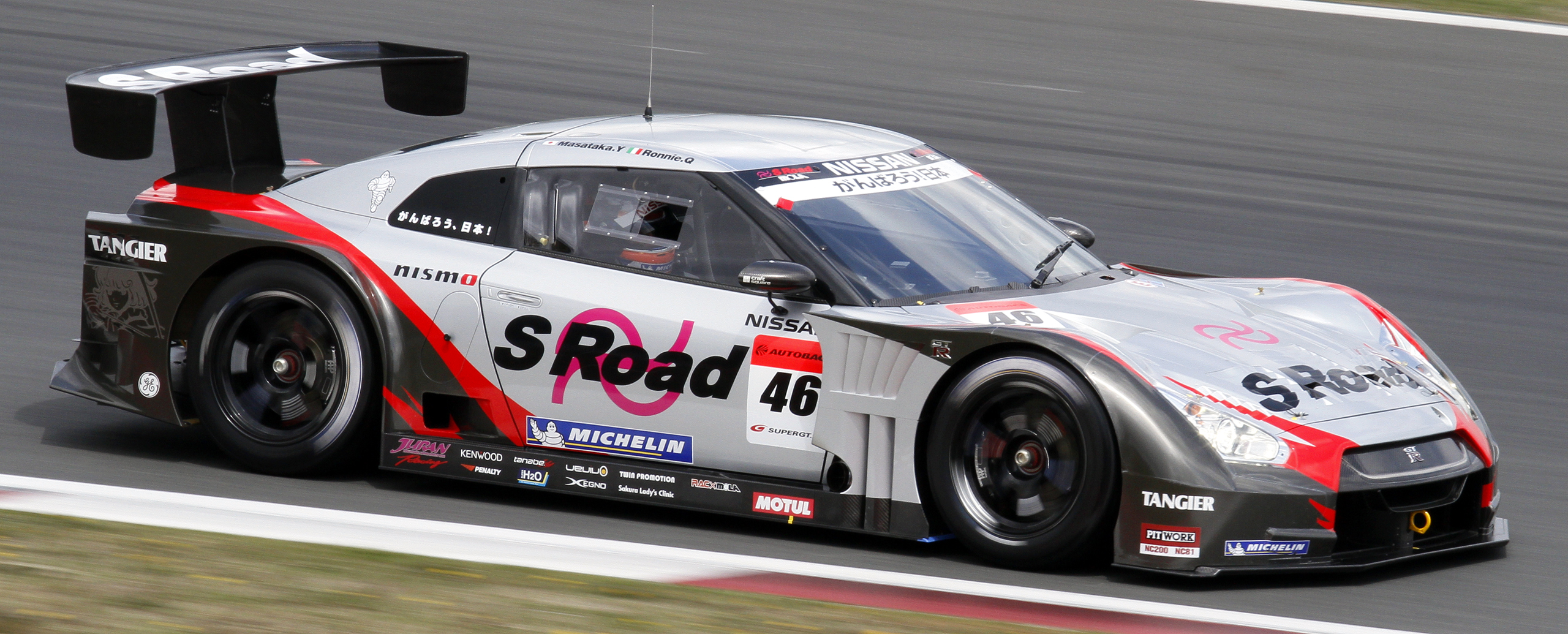
2011 GT500 champions, #46 S-Road MOLA Nissan GT-R.

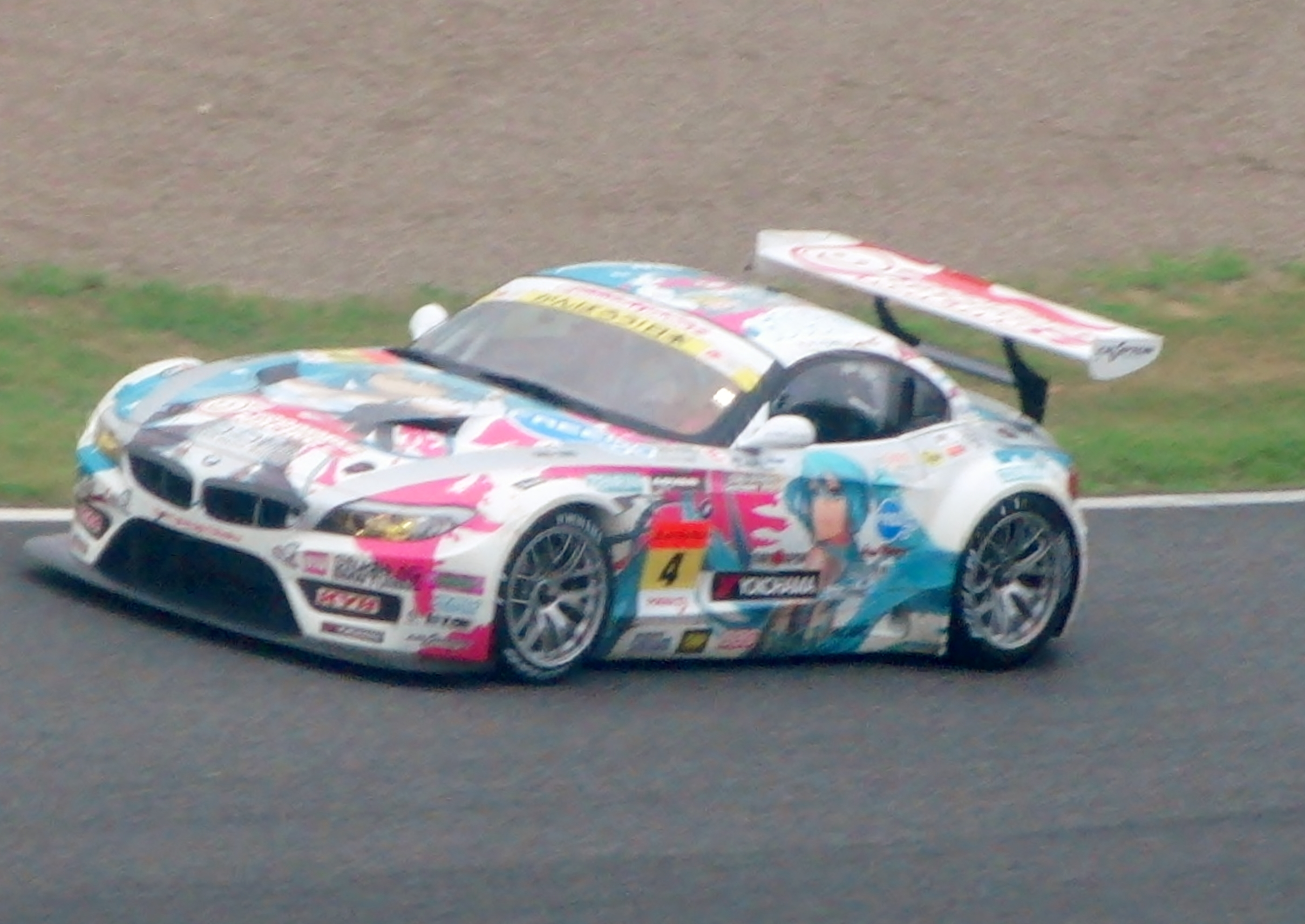
2011 GT300 champions, #4 Goodsmile Hatsune Miku BMW Z4 GT3.

The 2011 Autobacs Super GT Series was the nineteenth season of the Japan Automobile Federation Super GT Championship including the All Japan Grand Touring Car Championship (JGTC) era and the seventh season as the Super GT series. It also marked the twenty-ninth season of a JAF-sanctioned sports car racing championship dating back to the All Japan Sports Prototype Championship. It is a series for Grand Touring race cars divided into two categories: GT500 and GT300. The season began on May 1 and ended on November 13, 2011 after 8 races and 1 non-championship race. The season was due to start on April 2, but the 2011 Tōhoku earthquake and tsunami caused its postponement.

In the GT500 class, MOLA won the championship in their first ever season in the GT500 class. The MOLA drivers also scored some notable achievements with this title victory: Masataka Yanagida, who had won the GT300 title in 2003 and 2010, becomes the first (and so far only) driver to win both the GT500 and the GT300 class, while Ronnie Quintarelli would win his first out of four GT500 titles in this season. In the GT300 class, Goodsmile Racing & Studie shocked everyone by winning the championship with the Hatsune Miku itasha-liveried BMW Z4 GT3, giving series veteran Nobuteru Taniguchi and Taku Bamba their first title in this series. It also marked the first championship title for FIA GT3-specification cars in this series.

== Schedule ==
2011 Japanese venues

The provisional calendar was released on 8 August 2010. The Autopolis round which was absent the previous season was added to the calendar while the Suzuka race was reduced to a 700 km Endurance race only. Like the previous season, the non-Super GT pointed race JAF Grand Prix was to be raced as a conclusion to the season.

However, due to the 2011 Tōhoku earthquake and tsunami on March 11, a large part of the season was modified to cope with the situation.

The calendar was updated on 15 April 2011.

| Round | Race | Circuit | Date |
|---|---|---|---|
| 1 | Okayama GT 250km race | (Japan) Okayama International Circuit | May 22 |
| 2 | Fuji GT 400km race^{1} | (Japan) Fuji Speedway | May 1 |
| 3 | Super GT International Series Malaysia | (Malaysia) Sepang International Circuit | June 19 |
| 4 | Sugo GT 250km race | (Japan) Sportsland SUGO | July 30 |
| 5 | 40th Pokka GT Summer Special | (Japan) Suzuka Circuit | August 21 |
| 6 | Fuji GT 250km race | (Japan) Fuji Speedway | September 11 |
| 7 | Super GT in Kyushu 250km | (Japan) Autopolis | October 2 |
| 8 | Motegi GT 250km race | (Japan) Twin Ring Motegi | October 16 |
| NC | JAF Grand Prix - Fuji Sprint Cup | (Japan) Fuji Speedway | November 12 |
| NC | JAF Grand Prix - Fuji Sprint Cup | (Japan) Fuji Speedway | November 13 |

Notes:

- ^1 – Race distance was shortened to 300km, however the round retained the original name

== Impact of Tōhoku earthquake and tsunami ==
As a response of the 2011 Tōhoku earthquake and tsunami, the racing calendar and regulations were given a lot of modifications as a response to the national policy of energy conservation.

- The Okayama GT event, originally to be held on April 2 was postponed to 22 May despite damage to the Okayama International Circuit being minimal. The GT Association would still consider it as the 1st Round. The postponement of the Fuji Round was put under consideration as well.
- All race distances will be trimmed from 300 km to 250 km, other than the first Fuji race will change from 500 km to 300 km, and the Suzuka round from 700 km to 500 km. In addition, the Suzuka round will be only run in day sessions.
- Pitworks at nights are limited to a shorter period of time. Overnight works are not allowed between qualifying and the race.

== Drivers and teams ==
=== GT500 ===
| Team | Make | Car | Engine | # | Drivers | Tyre | Round |
|---|---|---|---|---|---|---|---|
| (Japan) Weider Honda Racing | Honda | Honda HSV-010 GT | Honda HR10EG 3.4 L V8 | 1 | (Japan) Takashi Kogure | B | All |
| (Japan) Weider Honda Racing | Honda | Honda HSV-010 GT | Honda HR10EG 3.4 L V8 | 1 | (France) Loïc Duval | B | All |
| (Japan) Lexus Team LeMans ENEOS | Lexus | Lexus SC430 GT500 | Lexus RV8KG 3.4 L V8 | 6 | (Japan) Daisuke Itō | B | All |
| (Japan) Lexus Team LeMans ENEOS | Lexus | Lexus SC430 GT500 | Lexus RV8KG 3.4 L V8 | 6 | (Japan) Kazuya Oshima | B | All |
| (Japan) Autobacs Racing Team Aguri | Honda | Honda HSV-010 GT | Honda HR10EG 3.4 L V8 | 8 | (Japan) Hideki Mutoh | B | All |
| (Japan) Autobacs Racing Team Aguri | Honda | Honda HSV-010 GT | Honda HR10EG 3.4 L V8 | 8 | (Japan) Takashi Kobayashi | B | All |
| (Japan) Team Impul | Nissan | Nissan GT-R GT500 | Nissan VRH34A 3.4 L V8 | 12 | (Japan) Tsugio Matsuda | B | All |
| (Japan) Team Impul | Nissan | Nissan GT-R GT500 | Nissan VRH34A 3.4 L V8 | 12 | (Brazil) João Paulo de Oliveira | B | All |
| (Japan) Keihin Real Racing | Honda | Honda HSV-010 GT | Honda HR10EG 3.4 L V8 | 17 | (Japan) Toshihiro Kaneishi | B | All |
| (Japan) Keihin Real Racing | Honda | Honda HSV-010 GT | Honda HR10EG 3.4 L V8 | 17 | (Japan) Koudai Tsukakoshi | B | All |
| (Japan) Lexus Team WedsSport BANDOH | Lexus | Lexus SC430 GT500 | Lexus RV8KG 3.4 L V8 | 19 | (Japan) Tatsuya Kataoka | Y | All |
| (Japan) Lexus Team WedsSport BANDOH | Lexus | Lexus SC430 GT500 | Lexus RV8KG 3.4 L V8 | 19 | (Japan) Seiji Ara | Y | All |
| (Japan) Nismo | Nissan | Nissan GT-R GT500 | Honda HR10EG 3.4 L V8 | 23 | (Japan) Satoshi Motoyama | B | All |
| (Japan) Nismo | Nissan | Nissan GT-R GT500 | Honda HR10EG 3.4 L V8 | 23 | (France) Benoît Tréluyer | B | All |
| (Japan) Kondō Racing | Nissan | Nissan GT-R GT500 | Nissan VRH34A 3.4 L V8 | 24 | (Japan) Hironobu Yasuda | Y | All |
| (Japan) Kondō Racing | Nissan | Nissan GT-R GT500 | Nissan VRH34A 3.4 L V8 | 24 | (Sweden) Björn Wirdheim | Y | All |
| (Japan) Nakajima Racing | Honda | Honda HSV-010 GT | Honda HR10EG 3.4 L V8 | 32 | (Japan) Ryō Michigami | D | All |
| (Japan) Nakajima Racing | Honda | Honda HSV-010 GT | Honda HR10EG 3.4 L V8 | 32 | (Japan) Yuhki Nakayama | D | All |
| (Japan) Lexus Team Kraft | Lexus | Lexus SC430 GT500 | Lexus RV8KG 3.4 L V8 | 35 | (Japan) Juichi Wakisaka | B | All |
| (Japan) Lexus Team Kraft | Lexus | Lexus SC430 GT500 | Lexus RV8KG 3.4 L V8 | 35 | (Portugal) André Couto | B | All |
| (Japan) Lexus Team Petronas TOM'S | Lexus | Lexus SC430 GT500 | Lexus RV8KG 3.4 L V8 | 36 | (Germany) André Lotterer | B | All |
| (Japan) Lexus Team Petronas TOM'S | Lexus | Lexus SC430 GT500 | Lexus RV8KG 3.4 L V8 | 36 | (Japan) Kazuki Nakajima | B | All |
| (Japan) Lexus Team ZENT Cerumo | Lexus | Lexus SC430 GT500 | Lexus RV8KG 3.4 L V8 | 38 | (Japan) Yuji Tachikawa | B | All |
| (Japan) Lexus Team ZENT Cerumo | Lexus | Lexus SC430 GT500 | Lexus RV8KG 3.4 L V8 | 38 | (Japan) Kohei Hirate | B | All |
| (Japan) Lexus Team SARD | Lexus | Lexus SC430 GT500 | Lexus RV8KG 3.4 L V8 | 39 | (Japan) Hiroaki Ishiura | M | All |
| (Japan) Lexus Team SARD | Lexus | Lexus SC430 GT500 | Lexus RV8KG 3.4 L V8 | 39 | (Japan) Takuto Iguchi | M | All |
| (Japan) MOLA | Nissan | Nissan GT-R GT500 | Nissan VRH34A 3.4 L V8 | 46 | (Japan) Masataka Yanagida | M | All |
| (Japan) MOLA | Nissan | Nissan GT-R GT500 | Nissan VRH34A 3.4 L V8 | 46 | (Italy) Ronnie Quintarelli | M | All |
| (Japan) Team Kunimitsu | Honda | Honda HSV-010 GT | Honda HR10EG 3.4 L V8 | 100 | (Japan) Takuya Izawa | B | All |
| (Japan) Team Kunimitsu | Honda | Honda HSV-010 GT | Honda HR10EG 3.4 L V8 | 100 | (Japan) Naoki Yamamoto | B | All |

=== GT300 ===
| Team | Make | Car | Engine | No. | Drivers | Tyre | Round |
|---|---|---|---|---|---|---|---|
| (Japan) Cars Tokai Dream28 | Mooncraft | Mooncraft Shiden | Toyota 1UZ-FE 4.4 L V8 | 2 | (Japan) Kazuho Takahashi | Y | All |
| (Japan) Cars Tokai Dream28 | Mooncraft | Mooncraft Shiden | Toyota 1UZ-FE 4.4 L V8 | 2 | (Japan) Hiroki Katoh | Y | All |
| (Japan) Goodsmile Racing & Studie with Team Ukyo | BMW | BMW Z4 GT3 | BMW P65B44 4.4 L V8 | 4 | (Japan) Nobuteru Taniguchi | Y | All |
| (Japan) Goodsmile Racing & Studie with Team Ukyo | BMW | BMW Z4 GT3 | BMW P65B44 4.4 L V8 | 4 | (Japan) Taku Bamba | Y | All |
| (Japan) Team Mach | Vemac | Vemac RD320R | Porsche M97/77 3.6 L F6 | 5 | (Japan) Haruki Kurosawa | Y | 2–8 |
| (Japan) Team Mach | Vemac | Vemac RD320R | Porsche M97/77 3.6 L F6 | 5 | (Japan) Tetsuji Tamanaka | Y | 2–3, 5–8 |
| (Japan) Team Mach | Vemac | Vemac RD320R | Porsche M97/77 3.6 L F6 | 5 | (Japan) Katsuhiko Tsutsui | Y | 4 |
| (Japan) Direction Racing | Porsche | Porsche 911 GT3 R | Porsche M97/79 4.0 L F6 | 7 | (Japan) Akira Mizutani | Y | 4–6 |
| (Japan) Direction Racing | Porsche | Porsche 911 GT3 R | Porsche M97/79 4.0 L F6 | 7 | (Netherlands) Carlo van Dam | Y | 4–6 |
| (Japan) Direction Racing | Porsche | Porsche 911 GT3 R | Porsche M97/79 4.0 L F6 | 7 | (Japan) You Yokomaku | Y | 5 |
| (Japan) Gainer | Ferrari | Ferrari F430 GT2 | Ferrari F136E 4.3 L V8 | 10 | (Japan) Masayuki Ueda | Y | 6–8 |
| (Japan) Gainer | Ferrari | Ferrari F430 GT2 | Ferrari F136E 4.3 L V8 | 10 | (Japan) Masataka Kawaguchi | Y | 6–8 |
| (Japan) Gainer | Ferrari | Ferrari 458 Italia GT2 | Ferrari F136F 4.5 L V8 | 11 | (Japan) Tetsuya Tanaka | D | All |
| (Japan) Gainer | Ferrari | Ferrari 458 Italia GT2 | Ferrari F136F 4.5 L V8 | 11 | (Japan) Katsuyuki Hiranaka | D | All |
| (Singapore) Team SG Changi | Lexus | Lexus IS350 | Lexus RV8J 3.4 L V8 | 14 | (Japan) Ryo Orime | Y | All |
| (Singapore) Team SG Changi | Lexus | Lexus IS350 | Lexus RV8J 3.4 L V8 | 14 | (Switzerland) Alexandre Imperatori | Y | 1–2, 4–8 |
| (Singapore) Team SG Changi | Lexus | Lexus IS350 | Lexus RV8J 3.4 L V8 | 14 | (Japan) Tsubasa Abe | Y | 3 |
| (Singapore) Team SG Changi | Lexus | Lexus IS350 | Lexus RV8J 3.4 L V8 | 14 | (Japan) Naoya Yamano | Y | NC |
| (Japan) Team Art Taste | Porsche | Porsche 911 GT3 R | Porsche M97/79 4.0 L F6 | 15 | (Germany) Tim Bergmeister | Y | 5–8, NC |
| (Japan) Team Art Taste | Porsche | Porsche 911 GT3 R | Porsche M97/79 4.0 L F6 | 15 | (Japan) Yasuhiro Shimizu | Y | 5–8, NC |
| (Japan) R'Qs Motorsports | Vemac | Vemac RD350R | Zytek ZV348 4.0 L V8 | 22 | (Japan) Hisashi Wada | Y | 1–5, 7, NC |
| (Japan) R'Qs Motorsports | Vemac | Vemac RD350R | Zytek ZV348 4.0 L V8 | 22 | (Japan) Masaki Jyonai | Y | 1–5, 7, NC |
| (Japan) Team Tsuchiya | Porsche | Porsche 997 GT3-RSR | Porsche M97/81 4.0 L F6 | 25 | (Japan) Takeshi Tsuchiya | Y | 1–8 |
| (Japan) Team Tsuchiya | Porsche | Porsche 997 GT3-RSR | Porsche M97/81 4.0 L F6 | 25 | (Japan) Akihiro Tsuzuki | Y | 1–8 |
| (Japan) Team Taisan | Porsche | Porsche 996 GT3 | Porsche M96/77 3.6 L F6 | 26 | (Japan) Kyosuke Mineo | Y | 1–7, NC |
| (Japan) Team Taisan | Porsche | Porsche 996 GT3 | Porsche M96/77 3.6 L F6 | 26 | (Japan) Hideshi Matsuda | Y | 1–3, 6, 8, NC |
| (Japan) Team Taisan | Porsche | Porsche 996 GT3 | Porsche M96/77 3.6 L F6 | 26 | (Japan) Junichiro Yamashita | Y | 4–5, 7–8 |
| (Japan) Team Taisan | Porsche | Porsche 996 GT3 | Porsche M96/77 3.6 L F6 | 26 | (Japan) Shogo Mitsuyama | Y | 5 |
| (Japan) Team Taisan | Ferrari | Ferrari F430 GT2 | Ferrari F136GT 4.3 L V8 | 41 | (Japan) Shinichi Yamaji | Y | 1–2, 4–6, 8, NC |
| (Japan) Team Taisan | Ferrari | Ferrari F430 GT2 | Ferrari F136GT 4.3 L V8 | 41 | (Japan) Hiroshi Koizumi | Y | 1–2, 4–6 |
| (Japan) Team Taisan | Ferrari | Ferrari F430 GT2 | Ferrari F136GT 4.3 L V8 | 41 | (Japan) Kyosuke Mineo | Y | 8 |
| (Japan) Team Taisan | Ferrari | Ferrari F430 GT2 | Ferrari F136GT 4.3 L V8 | 41 | (Japan) Junichiro Yamashita | Y | NC |
| (France) LMP Motorsport | Ferrari | Ferrari F430 GT2 | Ferrari F136GT 4.3 L V8 | 27 | (Japan) Yutaka Yamagishi | Y | All |
| (France) LMP Motorsport | Ferrari | Ferrari F430 GT2 | Ferrari F136GT 4.3 L V8 | 27 | (Japan) Hideki Yamauchi | Y | 1–6, NC |
| (France) LMP Motorsport | Ferrari | Ferrari F430 GT2 | Ferrari F136GT 4.3 L V8 | 27 | (Netherlands) Carlo van Dam | Y | 7–8 |
| (Japan) apr | Toyota | Toyota Corolla Axio apr GT | Toyota 2GR-FSE 3.5 L V6 | 31 | (Japan) Koki Saga | Y | All |
| (Japan) apr | Toyota | Toyota Corolla Axio apr GT | Toyota 2GR-FSE 3.5 L V6 | 31 | (Japan) Yuki Iwasaki | Y | All |
| (Japan) apr | Toyota | Toyota Corolla Axio apr GT | Toyota 2GR-FSE 3.5 L V6 | 74 | (Japan) Morio Nitta | Y | All |
| (Japan) apr | Toyota | Toyota Corolla Axio apr GT | Toyota 2GR-FSE 3.5 L V6 | 74 | (Japan) Yuji Kunimoto | Y | All |
| (Japan) Hankook KTR | Porsche | Porsche 911 GT3 R | Porsche M97/79 4.0 L F6 | 33 | (Japan) Masami Kageyama | H | All |
| (Japan) Hankook KTR | Porsche | Porsche 911 GT3 R | Porsche M97/79 4.0 L F6 | 33 | (Japan) Tomonobu Fujii | H | All |
| (Japan) Hankook KTR | Porsche | Porsche 997 GT3 RS | Porsche M97/81 4.0 L F6 | 34 | (Japan) Hiroshi Takamori | H | 1–2, 5–6 |
| (Japan) Hankook KTR | Porsche | Porsche 997 GT3 RS | Porsche M97/81 4.0 L F6 | 34 | (United States) Michael Kim | H | 1–2, 5–6 |
| (Japan) Hankook KTR | Porsche | Porsche 997 GT3 RS | Porsche M97/81 4.0 L F6 | 34 | (Japan) Naoya Gamou | H | 2, 5 |
| (Japan) Autobacs Racing Team Aguri | ASL | ASL ARTA Garaiya | Nissan VQ35DE 3.5 L V6 | 43 | (Japan) Shinichi Takagi | B | All |
| (Japan) Autobacs Racing Team Aguri | ASL | ASL ARTA Garaiya | Nissan VQ35DE 3.5 L V6 | 43 | (Japan) Kosuke Matsuura | B | All |
| (Japan) R&D Sport | Subaru | Subaru Legacy B4 | Subaru EJ20 2.0 L Turbo F4 | 62 | (Japan) Kota Sasaki | Y | All |
| (Japan) R&D Sport | Subaru | Subaru Legacy B4 | Subaru EJ20 2.0 L Turbo F4 | 62 | (Japan) Tetsuya Yamano | Y | All |
| (Japan) A speed | Aston Martin | Aston Martin V8 Vantage GT2 | Aston Martin AJ37 4.7 L V8 | 66 | (Japan) Hiroki Yoshimoto | Y | All |
| (Japan) A speed | Aston Martin | Aston Martin V8 Vantage GT2 | Aston Martin AJ37 4.7 L V8 | 66 | (Japan) Kazuki Hoshino | Y | All |
| (Singapore) ThunderAsia Racing | Mosler | Mosler MT900M | Judd XV675 3.5 L V8 | 69 | (Japan) Hiroki Yoshida | Y | 1–8 |
| (Singapore) ThunderAsia Racing | Mosler | Mosler MT900M | Judd XV675 3.5 L V8 | 69 | (Singapore) Melvin Choo | Y | 1–3, 5–8 |
| (Singapore) ThunderAsia Racing | Mosler | Mosler MT900M | Judd XV675 3.5 L V8 | 69 | (Japan) Naoki Yokomizo | Y | 4–5 |
| (Japan) JLOC | Lamborghini | Lamborghini Gallardo RG-3 | Lamborghini 07L1 5.2 L V10 | 86 | (Japan) Takayuki Aoki | Y | All |
| (Japan) JLOC | Lamborghini | Lamborghini Gallardo RG-3 | Lamborghini 07L1 5.2 L V10 | 86 | (Japan) Yuya Sakamoto | Y | All |
| (Japan) JLOC | Lamborghini | Lamborghini Gallardo RG-3 | Lamborghini 07L1 5.2 L V10 | 87 | (Japan) Manabu Orido | Y | All |
| (Japan) JLOC | Lamborghini | Lamborghini Gallardo RG-3 | Lamborghini 07L1 5.2 L V10 | 87 | (Japan) Atsushi Yogo | Y | All |
| (Japan) JLOC | Lamborghini | Lamborghini Gallardo RG-3 | Lamborghini 07L1 5.2 L V10 | 88 | (Japan) Hiroyuki Iiri | Y | All |
| (Japan) JLOC | Lamborghini | Lamborghini Gallardo RG-3 | Lamborghini 07L1 5.2 L V10 | 88 | (Japan) Yuhi Sekiguchi | Y | All |
| (Japan) Tomei Sports | Callaway | Callaway Corvette Z06.R GT3 | Callaway LS7.R 7.0 L V8 | 360 | (Japan) Atsushi Tanaka | Y | 1–2, 4, 7 |
| (Japan) Tomei Sports | Callaway | Callaway Corvette Z06.R GT3 | Callaway LS7.R 7.0 L V8 | 360 | (Japan) Kazuyoshi Okamura | Y | 1–2, 4 |
| (Japan) Tomei Sports | Callaway | Callaway Corvette Z06.R GT3 | Callaway LS7.R 7.0 L V8 | 360 | (Japan) Masahiro Matsunaga | Y | 7 |

== Team Movements ==
=== GT500 ===
- Honda
  - The original driver lineup from the ARTA, Ralph Firman and Yuji Ide, both left the team this season. They were replaced by Hideki Mutoh and Takashi Kobayashi respectively.
- Lexus
  - Racing Project Bandoh, GT300 Class Champion in 2009 season, will be participating in GT500 class this year.
  - Björn Wirdheim who drove in the ENEOS last season, moved to Nissan's Kondō Racing.
  - Lexus will using SC430 until season ends, as there are remaining SC430s in the factory. The SC430 will be replaced by the LFA in the next season.
- Nissan
  - MOLA, GT300 Class Champion in the 2008 season, will be participating in GT500 class this year. With Masataka Yanagida and Ronnie Quintarelli as their drivers, while João Paulo de Oliveira who was with Kondō Racing filled the void in the Impul team.

=== GT300 ===
- RE Amemiya, a regular GT300 entrant in the class since the 1995 JGTC season, has withdrawn from the series completely. While 2008 and 2009 GT300 Champion Team MOLA and Racing Project Bandoh both moved up to the GT500 class respectively. 2010 GT300 Champion Hasemi Motorsport also withdrawn the series in early April. Making both Nissan and Mazda car absent in the GT300 lineup this year, for the first time since 1995.
- Jim Gainer Team, which was using the Ferrari F430 in the 2010 season, switched 1 of their 2 cars to a Ferrari F458 GTC. Ferrari stated they are not likely to supply F458's to any of the Super GT teams. Team Mach also showed interest in using an F458 this season but due to the reason above, the plan was not implemented and they had to drive with a Vemac.
- Studie, which used a BMW Z4 (E86) in the 2008 and 2009 seasons, returned to the series with a BMW Z4 GT3, previously the #76 car used by Schubert Motorsport (Team Need for Speed) in the 2010 FIA GT3 European Championship season. They have hired former F1 driver Ukyo Katayama as their sporting director and former RE Amemiya driver Nobuteru Taniguchi as their driver.
- Team COX left the series after just one season in the series. Goodsmile Racing would later merge with Studie, bringing Taku Bamba to the team as well.
- Chevrolet cars, which previously appeared in Super GT in the 2007 season also returned to the series, with Tomei Sports replacing their 996 type Porsche 911 GT3 with a Corvette Z06-R.
- Porsche supplied two new 2010 specification Porsche 911 GT3Rs to Direction Racing and Team Art Taste, the latter team, which was a regular entrant of Super Taikyu series, also marked their debut season in Super GT. The 2010 specification Porsche 911 GT3R which was used by Team COX last season was given to the Hankook KTR team.
- Team SG Changi, which uses a Lexus IS350 with former RE Amemiya driver Ryo Orime and Alexandre Imperatori is participating in the series for the first time.
- Kazuki Hoshino, the driver's Champion of GT300 last year, moved from Hasemi Motorsport to A Speed (using an Aston Martin V8 Vantage GT2), replacing Hideshi Matsuda. Hasemi Motorsport was later to announce their withdrawal from the series.

== Calendar ==
| Round | Circuit | Date | Pole position | GT500 Winner | GT300 Winner |
|---|---|---|---|---|---|
| 2 | (Japan) Fuji Speedway^{1} | 1 May | No. 39 Lexus Team SARD | No. 23 Nismo | No. 33 Hankook KTR |
| 2 | (Japan) Fuji Speedway^{1} | 1 May | (Japan) Takuto Iguchi (Japan) Hiroaki Ishiura | (Japan) Satoshi Motoyama (France) Benoît Tréluyer | (Japan) Tomonobu Fujii (Japan) Masami Kageyama |
| 1^{2} | (Japan) Okayama International Circuit | 22 May | No. 17 Keihin Real Racing | No. 12 Team Impul | No. 66 A speed |
| 1^{2} | (Japan) Okayama International Circuit | 22 May | (Japan) Toshihiro Kaneishi (Japan) Koudai Tsukakoshi | (Japan) Tsugio Matsuda (Brazil) João Paulo de Oliveira | (Japan) Kazuki Hoshino (Japan) Hiroki Yoshimoto |
| 3 | (Malaysia) Sepang International Circuit | 19 June | No. 1 Weider Honda Racing | No. 1 Weider Honda Racing | No. 4 GSR&Studie with TeamUKYO |
| 3 | (Malaysia) Sepang International Circuit | 19 June | (France) Loïc Duval (Japan) Takashi Kogure | (France) Loïc Duval (Japan) Takashi Kogure | (Japan) Taku Bamba (Japan) Nobuteru Taniguchi |
| 4 | (Japan) Sportsland SUGO | 31 July | No. 46 MOLA | No. 46 MOLA | No. 14 Team SG CHANGI |
| 4 | (Japan) Sportsland SUGO | 31 July | (Italy) Ronnie Quintarelli (Japan) Masataka Yanagida | (Italy) Ronnie Quintarelli (Japan) Masataka Yanagida | (Switzerland) Alexandre Imperatori (Japan) Ryo Orime |
| 5^{3} | (Japan) Suzuka Circuit; Report | 21 August | No. 46 MOLA | No. 1 Weider Honda Racing | No. 62 R&D Sport |
| 5^{3} | (Japan) Suzuka Circuit; Report | 21 August | (Italy) Ronnie Quintarelli (Japan) Masataka Yanagida | (France) Loïc Duval (Japan) Takashi Kogure | (Japan) Tetsuya Yamano (Japan) Kota Sasaki |
| 6 | (Japan) Fuji Speedway | 11 September | No. 39 Lexus Team SARD | No. 38 Lexus Team ZENT Cerumo | No. 4 GSR&Studie with TeamUKYO |
| 6 | (Japan) Fuji Speedway | 11 September | (Japan) Hiroaki Ishiura (Japan) Takuto Iguchi | (Japan) Yuji Tachikawa (Japan) Kohei Hirate | (Japan) Taku Bamba (Japan) Nobuteru Taniguchi |
| 7 | (Japan) Autopolis | 2 October | No. 39 Lexus Team SARD | No. 23 Nismo | No. 62 R&D Sport |
| 7 | (Japan) Autopolis | 2 October | (Japan) Hiroaki Ishiura (Japan) Takuto Iguchi | (Japan) Satoshi Motoyama (France) Benoît Tréluyer | (Japan) Tetsuya Yamano (Japan) Kota Sasaki |
| 8 | (Japan) Twin Ring Motegi | 16 October | No. 46 MOLA | No. 23 Nismo | No. 4 GSR&Studie with TeamUKYO |
| 8 | (Japan) Twin Ring Motegi | 16 October | (Italy) Ronnie Quintarelli (Japan) Masataka Yanagida | (Japan) Satoshi Motoyama (France) Benoît Tréluyer | (Japan) Taku Bamba (Japan) Nobuteru Taniguchi |
| NC | (Japan) Fuji Speedway | 12 November | No. 46 MOLA | No. 46 MOLA | No. 4 GSR&Studie with TeamUKYO |
| NC | (Japan) Fuji Speedway | 12 November | (Italy) Ronnie Quintarelli | (Italy) Ronnie Quintarelli | (Japan) Nobuteru Taniguchi |
| NC | (Japan) Fuji Speedway | 13 November | No. 46 MOLA | No. 100 Team Kunimitsu | No. 4 GSR&Studie with TeamUKYO |
| NC | (Japan) Fuji Speedway | 13 November | (Japan) Masataka Yanagida | (Japan) Takuya Izawa | (Japan) Taku Bamba |

Notes:

- ^1 – Race stopped early due to bad weather, full points awarded.
- ^2 – The Okayama round was still considered Round 1.
- ^3 – Race stopped early due to energy curfew, full points awarded.

== Standings ==
=== GT500 Drivers ===
Scoring system

| Position | 1st | 2nd | 3rd | 4th | 5th | 6th | 7th | 8th | 9th | 10th |
| Points | 20 | 15 | 11 | 8 | 6 | 5 | 4 | 3 | 2 | 1 |

| Rank | Driver | No. | OKA (Japan) | FUJ (Japan) | SEP (Malaysia) | SUG (Japan) | SUZ (Japan) | FUJ (Japan) | AUT (Japan) | MOT (Japan) | Pts. |
|---|---|---|---|---|---|---|---|---|---|---|---|
| 1 | (Japan) Masataka Yanagida (Italy) Ronnie Quintarelli | 46 | 6 | 10 | 2 | 1 | 2 | 7 | 2 | 2 | 90 |
| 2 | (Japan) Satoshi Motoyama (France) Benoît Tréluyer | 23 | 5 | 1 | 14 | 12 | 4 | 6 | 1 | 1 | 79 |
| 3 | (Japan) Takashi Kogure (France) Loïc Duval | 1 | 7 | 13 | 1 | Ret | 1 | 4 | 11 | 6 | 57 |
| 4 | (Japan) Toshihiro Kaneishi (Japan) Koudai Tsukakoshi | 17 | 3 | 8 | 3 | 6 | 12 | 3 | 6 | 7 | 50 |
| 5 | (Japan) Tsugio Matsuda (Brazil) João Paulo de Oliveira | 12 | 1 | 14 | 15 | 13 | 3 | 2 | 10 | 9 | 49 |
| 6 | (Japan) Yuji Tachikawa (Japan) Kohei Hirate | 38 | 8 | 5 | 5 | 11 | 13 | 1 | 3 | 10 | 47 |
| 7 | (Japan) Hiroaki Ishiura (Japan) Takuto Iguchi | 39 | 13 | 6 | 13 | 2 | 5 | 8 | 15 | 3 | 40 |
| 8 | (Germany) André Lotterer (Japan) Kazuki Nakajima | 36 | 4 | 4 | 6 | 9 | 6 | 15 | 4 | 8 | 39 |
| 9 | (Japan) Takuya Izawa (Japan) Naoki Yamamoto | 100 | 2 | 12 | 7 | 7 | Ret | 5 | 14 | 4 | 37 |
| 10 | (Japan) Hironobu Yasuda (Sweden) Björn Wirdheim | 24 | 9 | 7 | 4 | 4 | 10 | 11 | 5 | 12 | 29 |
| 11 | (Japan) Daisuke Ito (Japan) Kazuya Oshima | 6 | 11 | 2 | 8 | 5 | 8 | 10 | 13 | 15 | 28 |
| 12 | (Japan) Ryō Michigami (Japan) Yuhki Nakayama | 32 | 10 | 15 | 12 | 3 | 13 | 12 | 8 | 5 | 21 |
| 13 | (Japan) Seiji Ara (Japan) Tatsuya Kataoka | 19 | 15 | 3 | 11 | 8 | 11 | 13 | 7 | 11 | 18 |
| 14 | (Japan) Juichi Wakisaka (Portugal) Andre Couto | 35 | 14 | 11 | 10 | Ret | 7 | 9 | 9 | 14 | 9 |
| 15 | (Japan) Hideki Mutoh (Japan) Takashi Kobayashi | 8 | 12 | 9 | 9 | 10 | 9 | 9 | 12 | 13 | 7 |
| Rank | Driver | No. | OKA (Japan) | FUJ (Japan) | SEP (Malaysia) | SUG (Japan) | SUZ (Japan) | FUJ (Japan) | AUT (Japan) | MOT (Japan) | Pts. |

| Colour | Result |
|---|---|
| Gold | Winner |
| Silver | Second place |
| Bronze | Third place |
| Green | Points classification |
| Blue | Non-points classification |
| Blue | Non-classified finish (NC) |
| Purple | Retired, not classified (Ret) |
| Red | Did not qualify (DNQ) |
| Red | Did not pre-qualify (DNPQ) |
| Black | Disqualified (DSQ) |
| White | Did not start (DNS) |
| White | Withdrew (WD) |
| White | Race cancelled (C) |
| Blank | Did not practice (DNP) |
| Blank | Did not arrive (DNA) |
| Blank | Excluded (EX) |

==== GT500 Teams' standings ====
| Rank | Team | No. | OKA (Japan) | FUJ (Japan) | SEP (Malaysia) | SUG (Japan) | SUZ (Japan) | FUJ (Japan) | AUT (Japan) | MOT (Japan) | FUJ (Japan) | FUJ (Japan) | Pts. |
|---|---|---|---|---|---|---|---|---|---|---|---|---|---|
| 1 | MOLA | 46 | 6 | 10 | 2 | 1 | 2 | 7 | 2 | 2 | 1 | 2 | 113 |
| 2 | Nismo | 23 | 5 | 1 | 14 | 12 | 4 | 6 | 1 | 1 | 12 | 11 | 102 |
| 3 | Weider Honda Racing | 1 | 7 | 13 | 1 | Ret | 1 | 4 | 11 | 6 | Ret | 5 | 75 |
| 4 | Keihin Real Racing | 17 | 3 | 8 | 3 | 6 | 12 | 3 | 6 | 7 | 11 | 3 | 71 |
| 5 | Team Impul | 12 | 1 | 14 | 15 | 13 | 3 | 2 | 10 | 9 | 2 | Ret | 68 |
| 6 | Lexus Team ZENT Cerumo | 38 | 8 | 5 | 5 | 11 | 13 | 1 | 3 | 10 | 5 | 12 | 68 |
| 7 | Lexus Team SARD | 39 | 13 | 6 | 13 | 2 | 5 | 8 | 15 | 3 | 9 | 8 | 61 |
| 8 | Lexus Team Petronas TOM'S | 36 | 4 | 4 | 6 | 9 | 6 | 15 | 4 | 8 | 4 | 7 | 60 |
| 9 | Team Kunimitsu | 100 | 2 | 12 | 7 | 7 | Ret | 5 | 14 | 4 | 8 | 1 | 56 |
| 10 | Lexus Team LeMans ENEOS | 6 | 11 | 2 | 8 | 5 | 8 | 10 | 13 | 15 | 7 | 4 | 50 |
| 11 | Kondo Racing | 24 | 9 | 7 | 4 | 4 | 10 | 11 | 5 | 12 | Ret | 9 | 50 |
| 12 | Lexus Team WedsSport Bandoh | 19 | 15 | 3 | 11 | 8 | 11 | 13 | 7 | 11 | 6 | 10 | 41 |
| 13 | Nakajima Racing | 32 | 10 | 15 | 12 | 3 | 13 | 12 | 8 | 5 | 13 | 13 | 37 |
| 14 | Lexus Team Kraft | 35 | 14 | 11 | 10 | Ret | 7 | 9 | 9 | 14 | 3 | 6 | 27 |
| 15 | Autobacs Racing Team Aguri | 8 | 12 | 9 | 9 | 10 | 9 | 9 | 12 | 13 | 10 | Ret | 26 |
| Rank | Team | No. | OKA (Japan) | FUJ (Japan) | SEP (Malaysia) | SUG (Japan) | SUZ (Japan) | FUJ (Japan) | AUT (Japan) | MOT (Japan) | FUJ (Japan) | FUJ (Japan) | Pts. |

=== GT300 Drivers ===
Scoring system

| Position | 1st | 2nd | 3rd | 4th | 5th | 6th | 7th | 8th | 9th | 10th |
| Points | 20 | 15 | 11 | 8 | 6 | 5 | 4 | 3 | 2 | 1 |

| Rank | Driver | No. | OKA (Japan) | FUJ (Japan) | SEP (Malaysia) | SUG (Japan) | SUZ (Japan) | FUJ (Japan) | AUT (Japan) | MOT (Japan) | Pts. |
|---|---|---|---|---|---|---|---|---|---|---|---|
| 1 | (Japan) Nobuteru Taniguchi (Japan) Taku Bamba | 4 | 4 | 5 | 1 | 6 | 5 | 1 | 9 | 1 | 87 |
| 2 | (Japan) Tetsuya Tanaka (Japan) Katsuyuki Hiranaka | 11 | 2 | 2 | 2 | 7 | 4 | 22 | 2 | 3 | 83 |
| 3 | (Japan) Masami Kageyama (Japan) Tomonobu Fujii | 33 | 14 | 1 | 9 | 5 | 2 | 11 | 17 | 2 | 58 |
| 4 | (Japan) Tetsuya Yamano (Japan) Kota Sasaki | 62 | 8 | 18 | 8 | Ret | 1 | 6 | 1 | 6 | 56 |
| 5 | (Japan) Ryo Orime | 14 | 15 | 16 | Ret | 1 | 8 | 2 | 3 | Ret | 49 |
| 6 | (Switzerland) Alexandre Imperatori | 14 | 15 | 16 | | 1 | 8 | 2 | 3 | Ret | 49 |
| 7 | (Japan) Yuji Kunimoto (Japan) Morio Nitta | 74 | 6 | 7 | 6 | 2 | 7 | 12 | 8 | 9 | 38 |
| 8 | (Japan) Kazuki Hoshino (Japan) Hiroki Yoshimoto | 66 | 1 | Ret | Ret | 8 | 12 | 9 | 11 | 4 | 33 |
| 9 | (Japan) Takeshi Tsuchiya (Japan) Akihiro Tsuzuki | 25 | Ret | 3 | Ret | 4 | 9 | 5 | 5 | 19 | 33 |
| 10 | (Japan) Kazuho Takahashi (Japan) Hiroki Katoh | 2 | 7 | Ret | 10 | 13 | 6 | 3 | 4 | 8 | 32 |
| 11 | (Japan) Manabu Orido (Japan) Atsushi Yogo | 87 | 3 | 14 | 7 | 16 | 3 | 19 | 16 | 16 | 26 |
| 12 | (Japan) Shinichi Takagi (Japan) Kosuke Matsuura | 43 | 20 | 6 | 5 | 3 | 20 | 12 | 13 | 7 | 26 |
| 13 | (Japan) Yuhi Sekiguchi (Japan) Hiroyuki Iiri | 88 | Ret | 8 | 4 | 15 | 10 | 4 | 12 | 5 | 26 |
| 14 | (Japan) Yutaka Yamagishi | 27 | 5 | 11 | 3 | Ret | 11 | 7 | 10 | 14 | 22 |
| 15 | (Japan) Hideki Yamauchi | 27 | 5 | 11 | 3 | Ret | 11 | 7 | | | 21 |
| 16 | (Japan) Koki Saga (Japan) Yuki Iwasaki | 31 | 12 | 4 | 11 | Ret | 13 | 13 | 7 | 11 | 12 |
| 17 | (Japan) Takayuki Aoki (Japan) Yuya Sakamoto | 86 | 10 | Ret | 14 | 15 | 10 | 8 | 6 | 12 | 10 |
| 18 | (Japan) Shinichi Yamaji | 41 | 9 | 9 | | 12 | 17 | 21 | | Ret | 4 |
| 19 | (Japan) Hiroshi Koizumi | 41 | 9 | 9 | | 12 | 17 | 21 | | | 4 |
| 20 | (Japan) Haruki Kurosawa | 5 | 19 | | 12 | 9 | Ret | 17 | 21 | 16 | 2 |
| 21 | (Japan) Katsuhiko Tsutsui | 5 | | | | 9 | | | | | 2 |
| 22 | (Japan) Hiroshi Takamori (United States) Michael Kim | 34 | 17 | 10 | | | Ret | Ret | | | 1 |
| 23 | (Japan) Yasuhiro Shimizu (Germany) Tim Bergmeister | 15 | | | | | 16 | 10 | 15 | 13 | 1 |
| 24 | (Netherlands) Carlo van Dam | 7/27 | | DNQ | | 14 | Ret | 16 | 10 | 14 | 1 |
| 25 | (Japan) Junichiro Yamashita | 26 | | 12 | | 11 | 14 | | 20 | 10 | 1 |
| 26 | (Japan) Hideshi Matsuda | 26 | 11 | 12 | 13 | | | 15 | | 10 | 1 |
| - | (Japan) Kyosuke Mineo | 26/41 | 11 | 12 | 13 | 11 | 14 | 15 | 20 | Ret | 0 |
| - | (Japan) Tetsuji Tamanaka | 5 | | 19 | 12 | | Ret | 17 | 21 | 15 | 0 |
| - | (Japan) Hisashi Wada (Japan) Masaki Jyonai | 22 | 13 | 13 | 16 | Ret | 19 | | 14 | | 0 |
| - | (Japan) Akira Mizutani | 7 | | DNQ | | 14 | Ret | 16 | | | 0 |
| - | (Japan) Shogo Mitsuyama | 26 | | | | | 14 | | | | 0 |
| - | (Japan) Hiroki Yoshida | 69 | 15 | 16 | 15 | Ret | 18 | 20 | 19 | 18 | 0 |
| - | (Singapore) Melvin Choo | 69 | 15 | 16 | 15 | | 18 | 20 | 19 | 18 | 0 |
| - | (Japan) Atsushi Tanaka | 360 | 17 | 18 | | DNS | | | DNS | | 0 |
| - | (Japan) Kazuyoshi Okamura | 360 | 17 | 18 | | DNS | | | | | 0 |
| - | (Japan) Masayuki Ueda (Japan) Masataka Kawaguchi | 10 | | | | | | 18 | 18 | 17 | 0 |
| - | (Japan) Naoki Yokomizo | 69 | | | | Ret | 18 | | | | 0 |
| - | (Japan) Naoya Gamou | 34 | NC | | | | Ret | | | | 0 |
| - | (Japan) Tsubasa Abe | 14 | | | Ret | | | | | | 0 |
| - | (Japan) Yu Yokomaku | 7 | | | | | Ret | | | | 0 |
| - | (Japan) Masahiro Matsunaga | 360 | | | | | | | DNS | | 0 |
| Rank | Driver | No. | OKA (Japan) | FUJ (Japan) | SEP (Malaysia) | SUG (Japan) | SUZ (Japan) | FUJ (Japan) | AUT (Japan) | MOT (Japan) | Pts. |

| Colour | Result |
|---|---|
| Gold | Winner |
| Silver | Second place |
| Bronze | Third place |
| Green | Points classification |
| Blue | Non-points classification |
| Blue | Non-classified finish (NC) |
| Purple | Retired, not classified (Ret) |
| Red | Did not qualify (DNQ) |
| Red | Did not pre-qualify (DNPQ) |
| Black | Disqualified (DSQ) |
| White | Did not start (DNS) |
| White | Withdrew (WD) |
| White | Race cancelled (C) |
| Blank | Did not practice (DNP) |
| Blank | Did not arrive (DNA) |
| Blank | Excluded (EX) |

==== GT300 Teams' standings ====
| Rank | Team | No. | OKA (Japan) | FUJ (Japan) | SEP (Malaysia) | SUG (Japan) | SUZ (Japan) | FUJ (Japan) | AUT (Japan) | MOT (Japan) | FUJ (Japan) | FUJ (Japan) | Pts. |
|---|---|---|---|---|---|---|---|---|---|---|---|---|---|
| 1 | Goodsmile Racing & Studie with Team Ukyo | 4 | 4 | 5 | 1 | 6 | 5 | 1 | 9 | 1 | 1 | 1 | 111 |
| 2 | Jim Gainer | 11 | 2 | 2 | 2 | 7 | 4 | 22 | 2 | 3 | 4 | 3 | 105 |
| 3 | Hankook KTR | 33 | 14 | 1 | 9 | 5 | 2 | 11 | 17 | 2 | 2 | 2 | 82 |
| 4 | R&D Sport | 62 | 8 | 18 | 8 | Ret | 1 | 6 | 1 | 6 | 14 | 5 | 75 |
| 5 | Team SG Changi | 14 | 15 | 16 | Ret | 1 | 8 | 2 | 3 | Ret | 8 | 11 | 65 |
| 6 | apr | 74 | 6 | 7 | 6 | 2 | 7 | 12 | 8 | 9 | 16 | 10 | 62 |
| 7 | Cars Tokai Dream28 | 2 | 7 | Ret | 10 | 13 | 6 | 3 | 4 | 8 | 13 | 7 | 51 |
| 8 | A speed | 66 | 1 | Ret | Ret | 8 | 12 | 9 | 11 | 4 | 10 | Ret | 49 |
| 9 | Samurai Team Tsuchiya | 25 | Ret | 3 | Ret | 4 | 9 | 5 | 5 | 19 | | | 49 |
| 10 | Autobacs Racing Team Aguri | 43 | 20 | 6 | 5 | 3 | 20 | 12 | 13 | 7 | 3 | 4 | 46 |
| 11 | JLOC | 88 | Ret | 8 | 4 | 15 | 10 | 4 | 12 | 5 | 7 | Ret | 45 |
| 12 | JLOC | 87 | 3 | 14 | 7 | 16 | 3 | 19 | 16 | 16 | 11 | 12 | 42 |
| 13 | LMP Motorsport | 27 | 5 | 11 | 3 | Ret | 11 | 7 | 10 | 14 | 6 | 6 | 41 |
| 14 | apr | 31 | 12 | 4 | 11 | Ret | 13 | 13 | 7 | 11 | Ret | 15 | 31 |
| 15 | JLOC | 86 | 10 | Ret | 14 | 15 | 10 | 8 | 6 | 12 | 9 | 8 | 27 |
| 16 | Team Taisan Cinecitta | 26 | 11 | 12 | 13 | 11 | 14 | 15 | 20 | 10 | Ret | 14 | 19 |
| 17 | Team Taisan Cinecitta | 41 | 9 | 9 | | 12 | 17 | 21 | | Ret | 15 | 13 | 15 |
| 18 | Team Mach | 5 | 19 | | 12 | 9 | Ret | 17 | 21 | 16 | | | 14 |
| 19 | Team Art Taste | 15 | | | | | 16 | 10 | 15 | 13 | 5 | 9 | 11 |
| 20 | R'QS Motorsports | 22 | 13 | 13 | 16 | Ret | 19 | | 14 | | 12 | Ret | 9 |
| 21 | Thunder Asia Racing | 69 | 15 | 16 | 15 | Ret | 18 | 20 | 19 | 18 | | | 9 |
| 22 | Hankook KTR | 34 | 17 | 10 | | | Ret | Ret | | | | | 5 |
| 23 | Direction Racing | 7 | | | | 14 | Ret | 16 | | | | | 4 |
| 24 | Jim Gainer | 10 | | | | | | 18 | 18 | 17 | | | 3 |
| 25 | Tomei Sports | 360 | 17 | 18 | | DNS | | | DNS | | | | 2 |
| Rank | Team | No. | OKA (Japan) | FUJ (Japan) | SEP (Malaysia) | SUG (Japan) | SUZ (Japan) | FUJ (Japan) | AUT (Japan) | MOT (Japan) | FUJ (Japan) | FUJ (Japan) | Pts. |
