= Nobuteru Taniguchi =

Japanese racing driver and drifter

Nobuteru Taniguchi 谷口信輝
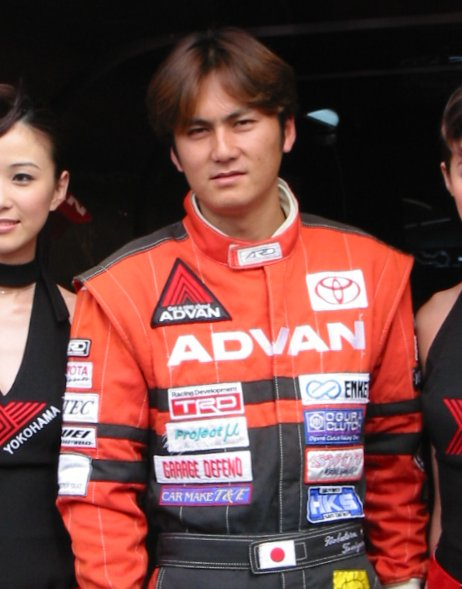
- Taniguchi in 2002
- Nationality: Japan
- Born: 18 May 1971 (age 55) Hiroshima

Super GT career
- Debut season: 2002 (GT300)
- Current team: Goodsmile Racing & Team Ukyo
- Categorisation: FIA Gold (until 2021); FIA Silver (2022–)
- Car number: 4
- Former teams: RE Amemiya, Racing Project Bandoh, Direxiv, R&D Sport, Team Taisan
- Championships: 2011, 2014, 2017
- Wins: 18

D1GP career
- Debut season: 2001
- Years active: 2001-2005, 2008, 2012-2014
- Teams: After Fire, HKS
- Championships: 1 (2001)
- Wins: 5

Super Taikyu career
- Debut season: 2001
- Years active: 2001-2002, 2004-2005 2008-2013, 2023
- Teams: Advan, Petronas Syntium, D'Station
- Championships: 8

Nobuteru 'NOB' Taniguchi (谷口 信輝, Taniguchi Nobuteru; born May 18, 1971, Hiroshima) is a Japanese racing driver and drifting driver who currently competes in the Super GT racing series. Taniguchi is commonly nicknamed "NOB" (first three letters from his name, meaning "No One Better") or "The Pimp" as a reference to his S15 Silvia which he is best known for.

Taniguchi is a three-time Super GT GT300 class champion, eight-time Super Taikyu class champion, and The first D1 Grand Prix and professional drifting champion.

== Career ==
Taniguchi began his motorsport career when he was racing minibikes and won a Honda sponsored All Japan Mini Bike race, which took place at its Suzuka Circuit. However Taniguchi stop competing after the shop that own the bike he raced sold the bike.

Taniguchi would progress into four wheels and became interested in drifting. With advice from his cousin, he acquired a Toyota AE86 while Taniguchi himself originally wanted Mazda RX-7. He moved to Tokyo in 1998 with the aim of becoming a motor journalist. He also worked at Takahiro Ueno's car bodykit company, Car Make T&E to supplement his racing career whilst competing in various one make series racing with the Toyota Celica and Vitz and participating in drift events. In 1999, he came into the attention of HKS when he won a Suzuka Clubman Race in a Honda Civic sponsored by Bride. HKS signed him up as a test driver and as a sponsor, as well as sponsoring his S15 Silvia for drift events.

=== Drifting ===
Taniguchi started out in street racing with his AE86 when he was with his team 'After-Fire' and competed in the various drift competitions like Video Option's Ikaten, Battle Magazine's BM-Cup, and CarBoy's DoriCon GP.

After competing in Ikaten, Taniguchi was recognised for his driving skill and was invited again to do demo run at subsequent Ikaten event as well as Video Option segment and eventually became a judge for Ikaten which he still did now when Option revived it.

==== D1 Grand Prix ====
In the inaugural season of D1 Grand Prix in 2001, Taniguchi won the championship with his team After-Fire sponsored by HKS, after winning two of the five rounds driving his personal Nissan Silvia S15. He famously used a semi-slick tires in the final round which gives him an advantage to other competitors which eventually win him the championship.

However starting in 2002, Taniguchi, now as HKS works driver didn't have much chances with the series champion title as he did in 2001 as the series had banned the use of S-tires/Semi-slicks that was occurring the year before. Before the season start, the S15 HKS built for him crashed by Keiichi Tsuchiya during testing which forced the team to borrow Taniguchi personal S15 for the opening round. But he still doing very well, staying as a seeded driver. He finished the 2002 season in second place as the runner-up with one round win when the HKS S15 finally debut and two podiums. In the 2003 season Taniguchi faced more setback with reliability including another mishap before the opening round when the HKS S15 blew and he had to use his personal car again and eventually crashing during qualifying. He managed to rescue his season as with a new and improved second HKS S15 as he finishes fourth place with one win and two podiums.

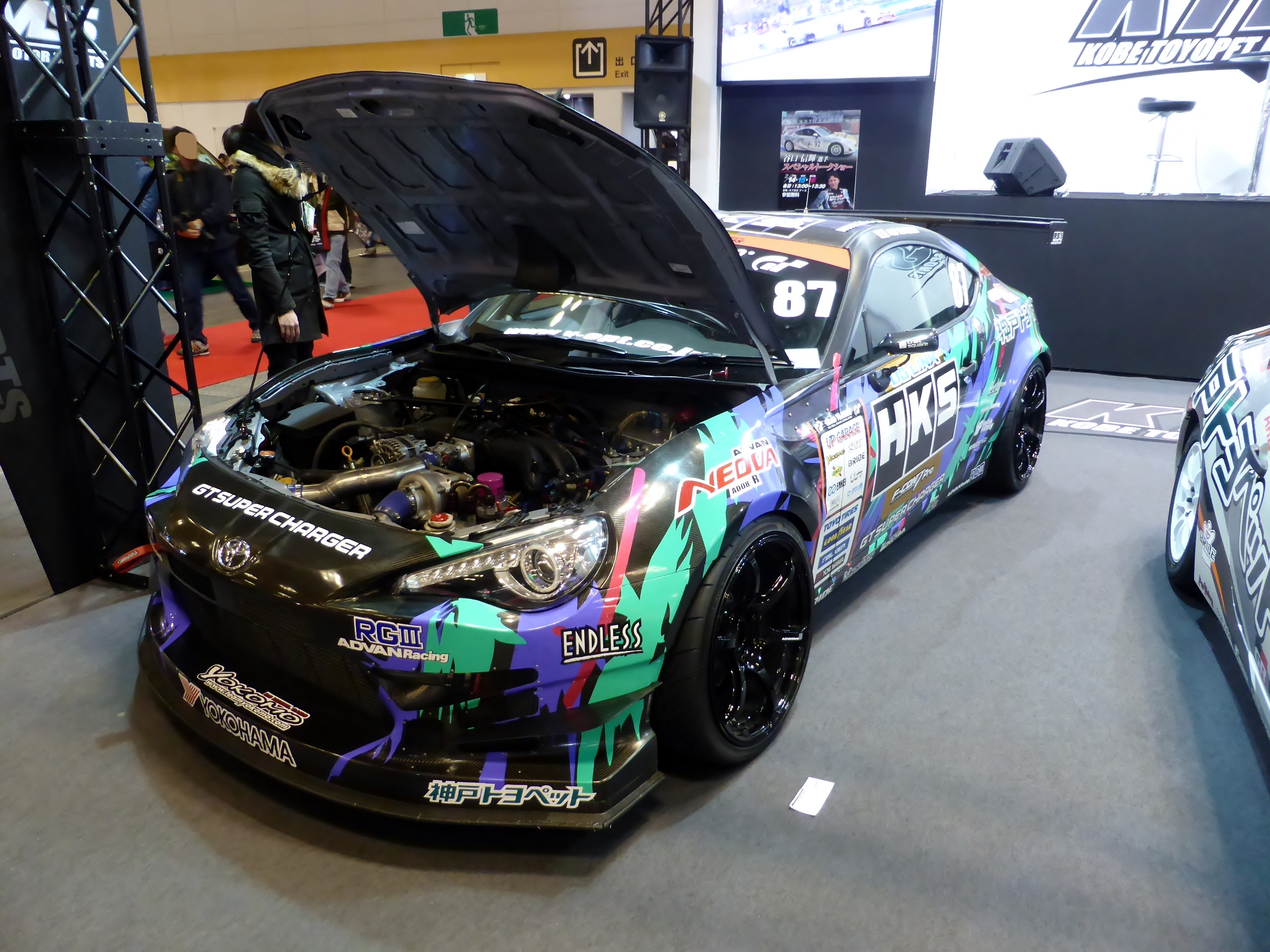
HKS' GT86 Taniguchi drove in 2014 D1GP season

Taniguchi started the 2004 season of D1GP better with him leading the championship after winning at Autopolis which turns out to be his last win in D1GP, HKS decided to switched car from the S15 to an Altezza which had not been properly set up and had shown some technical issues that many believe cost him the championship that year, as he finished in second place as the runner-up with one win and three podium finishes. Taniguchi did admit that he wanted to finish the 2004 season with the S15 RS-2 instead, as well as wanting to retire the car with the champion title under its name.

During the 2005 season, the switch to Altezza proved to be a mistake for HKS and NOB despite early success with a runner-up finish at Odaiba which led them to quit the series at the end of the season, with only one podium finish. Both Taniguchi and HKS did not return to the D1 series as they were unwilling to compete without each other until 2008 when they returned as spot participants at Fuji Speedway and exhibition at Odaiba with the Altezza. Taniguchi planned to return in 2009 but did not as HKS was unwilling to return despite Taniguchi already raising the budget and sponsor for the season.

Finally he and HKS fully returned to the series again in 2012 with a Toyota 86 and scored two podium finishes.

Despite a good start in 2012, HKS and Taniguchi failed to extract the car potential despite a switch to NOS-equipped twincharger set up for 2013 and 3.4 2JZ engine in 2014. In those two seasons Taniguchi did not do a full season due to a scheduling clash with his Super GT commitment.

Taniguchi went through five cars with HKS for D1, between 2001 and 2005, the RS1 Hyper Silvia S15 (Crashed by Keiichi Tsuchiya, eventually rebuilt for 2002 and later revised as a backup car with a similar build to the RS2 in 2003, initially brought to HKS Europe but it was later bought by Rockstar Energy to be used in Formula D), and RS2 Hyper Silvia S15 (brought to HKS Europe), the Genki Racing Project Altezza, which was designed with off-the-shelf HKS parts, for the purpose that a private drifter could copy the car, HKS also built a second Altezza nicknamed IS220Z which originally his car but he lent it to be built by HKS for the event.

Taniguchi had the most wins in D1 Grand Prix until his tally was overtaken by Youichi Imamura in 2005.

In 2016 Taniguchi and HKS return to D1GP at an exhibition event titled D1GP Champions in Odaiba competing in the same Toyota 86 he use previously but announced that it will be his final run and officially retired from professional drifting after the event.

==== Outside D1GP ====
Taniguchi also drives a Toyota Aristo (Lexus GS300 in US) for non-D1 events. In 2016, he purchased a Nissan 180SX as a drift practice car with suspension and arm parts produced and being set up by fellow D1GP champion Masato Kawabata. The car is also equipped with Kick Blue body kit also produced by Kawabata. He later sold the car and purchased Kawabata's D1GP China championship-winning 180SX as replacement.

HKS and Formula Drift made an exclusive partnership in 2007 that brought NOB to the United States to perform drifting exhibitions at Formula Drift events. Taniguchi made his first appearance at Formula Drift's second event Road Atlanta, May 11 and 12, 2007.

Taniguchi regularly appeared in Formula Drift Japan event as Japanese colour commentator alongside announcer Tom Saeba and sometimes as judge.

=== Racing ===
==== JGTC/Super GT ====
Taniguchi has been heavily involved in the JGTC / Super GT racing series since 2002, winning the championship three times in the GT300 class.

In 2002, Taniguchi began competing in JGTC with RE Amemiya in a Mazda RX-7 and winning his first race at Sepang in only his fourth race in the series. He joined Racing Project Bandoh in 2004 and continued to compete in the series with the team as it was renamed Super GT in 2005. After a GT500 did not materialised, he moved to Direxiv/ R&D Sports in 2006 where he come close to winning the championship. He moved team again this time to Team Taisan in 2007–2008.

He returned to Amemiya in 2009 this time appointed as the lead driver alongside Ryo Orime. While the team did not win any race that season, They performed consistently despite having scored podium in all but three round however a did not start at Fuji and the team nearly not starting the finale at Motegi costed the team as they misses out on championship by three points and ended up second in both team and driver championship. 2010 started better with a win at the opening round at Suzuka but after Orime crashed while leading in following round at Okayama and non-scoring at Fuji the team is in backfoot. Despite winning at Sepang, the team unable to finish in top five in any of the following races and ended up third in both standings.

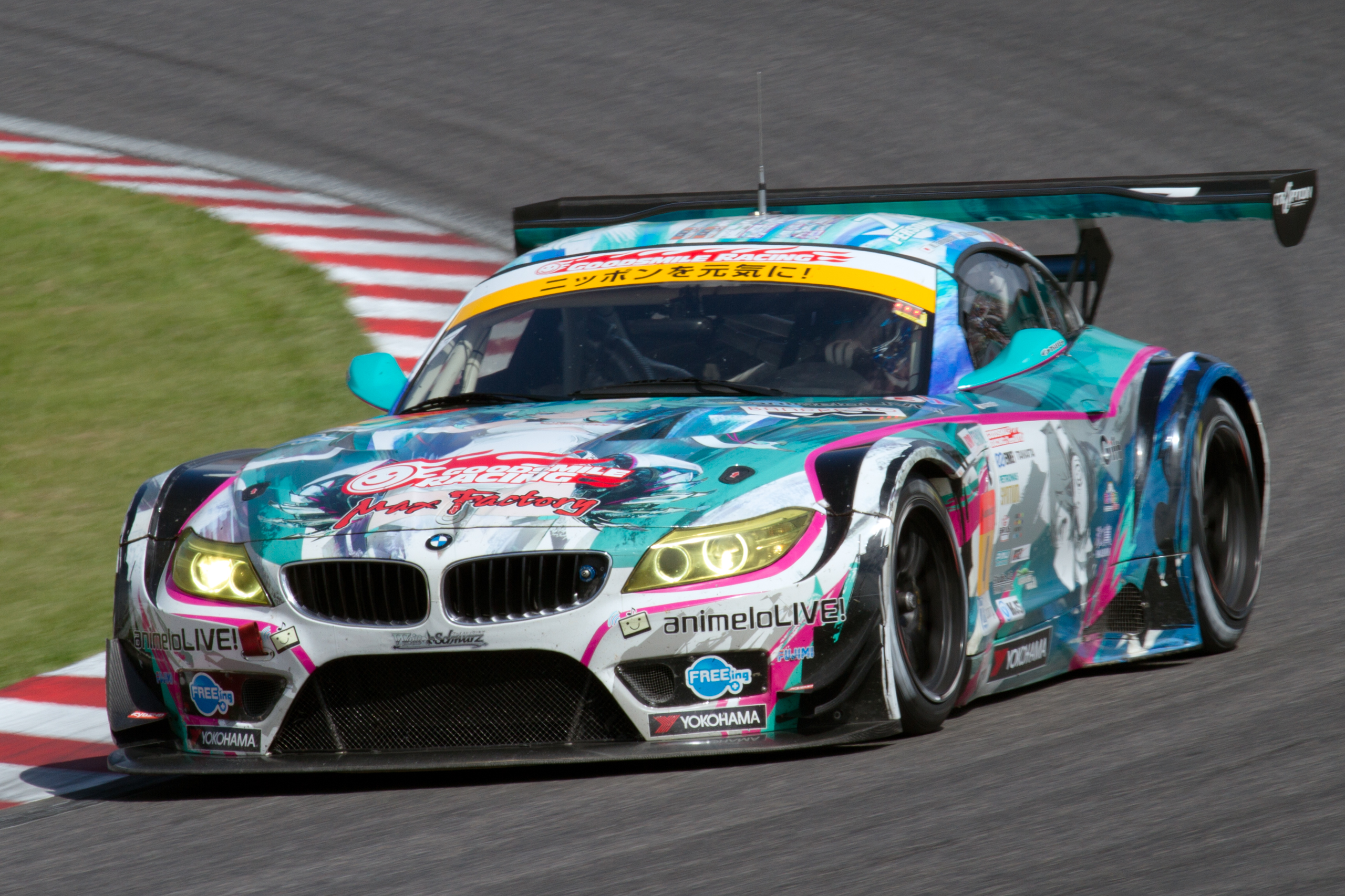
Taniguchi driving Goodsmile Racing BMW Z4 GT3 in 2014

After RE Amemiya's withdrawal at the end of 2010 season, he moved to Goodsmile Racing who change maintenance to RS Fine which previously handle RE Amemiya and work together with BMW tuner Studie and former F1 driver Ukyo Katayama and utilized a BMW Z4 GT3. He won the GT300 Championship title in the 2011 season alongside Taku Bamba scoring three wins which is the most win for GT300 team before the record is broken in 2024. In 2012 he is paired with 2009 champion Tatsuya Kataoka and the two would win the championship again with the BMW Z4 GT3. Taniguchi captured 3rd place in the 2014 season finale at Twin Ring Motegi, secured 78 points in total for his season, narrowly winning the GT300 Championship title again with no points difference but only 1 more race victory but the team misses out on the team championship. After splitting with Studie, Goodsmile switch to Mercedes SLS AMG GT3 in 2015 before changing to a new Mercedes-AMG GT3 the following year. and in the 2017 season, he won his third GT300 Championship title again alongside Kataoka and both became the drivers with the most titles in the GT300 class of Super GT. His partnership with Kataoka span for 15 years and 2 championship making them the longest and one of the most successful driver pairing in the aeseries history.

Taniguchi never raced in GT500 although he driven a GT500 car in a non championship Suzuka 1000km race for Team SARD alongside Manabu Orido and Jérémie Dufour in 2002 driving a Toyota Supra. He is supposed to join Team Tsuchiya for 2006 season alongside Manabu Orido with backing from the team title sponsor Yokohama and Eclipse. However a last minute change following TOM'S downscaling to one car, son of team owner Takeshi Tsuchiya is drafted instead while Taniguchi raced for Direxiv in GT300 class that season before the team is taken over by R&D Sports following Direxiv withdrawal from motorsports.

==== Super Taikyu ====
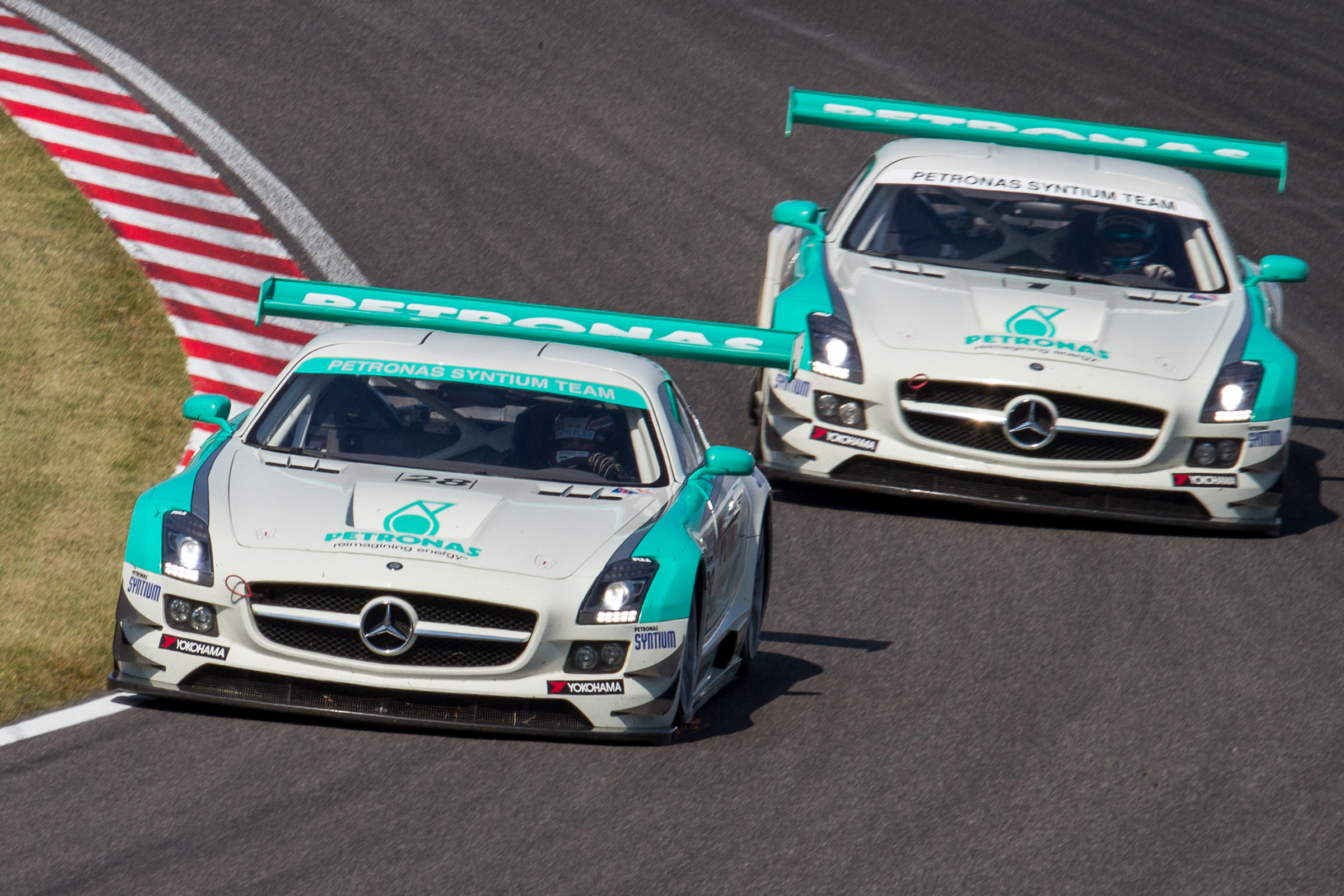
Taniguchi's class championship-winning #1 Mercedes-Benz SLS AMG GT3 (right) in 2012

Taniguchi began competing in the Super Taikyu series in 2001, winning a total of eight class championship titles since then. Early on in his Super Taikyu career, he won a class championship in 2002 and 2005.

In 2005 he and fellow D1GP driver and close friend Manabu Orido went on to dominate the series ST-1 class driving a Yokohama Advan sponsored Porsche 996 GT3 winning all but the opening round including that year 24 hours of Tokachi with the duo joined by Dominik Schwager for the race.

He later went on to win a record six back-to-back class championship titles racing for the Petronas Syntium team from 2008 to 2013, driving the BMW Z4 M Coupé and Mercedes-Benz SLS AMG GT3.

He return for one-off appearance with D'Station Racing for final round of 2023 season driving Aston Martin Vantage GT8R in ST-1 class. He is reunited with Manabu Orido for the first time since their championship winning year in 2005. The duo win their class after starting from pole position, the two first win together in 18 years.

==== Time attack ====
Taniguchi who still works driver for HKS till this day, drove the HKS Time Attack Mitsubishi Lancer Evolution 7 (named the TRB-002) and set a 54.37 second lap time at Tsukuba Circuit (famous for its complexity and focus on cornering skills) before crashing the car during another attempt. In 2007, he drove the all carbon fiber body Mitsubishi Evolution which is the same car as the one he drove in 2004 now renamed to the HKS CT230R set the Tsukuba Time Attack record of 53.589 seconds (video).

Taniguchi and HKS have not limited their racing campaign to Japan. In 2005, Taniguchi drove the HKS USA Mitsubishi Evolution in the Car and Driver Super Tuner Challenge against top US manufacturers and drivers. Taniguchi beat the nearest competitor by three seconds, and set the day's fastest ¼ mile, 0-60, and road course times. In 2006, Taniguchi drove the HKS Speed Source RX-8 in the Grand Am Cup race at Arizona's Phoenix International Raceway and set the fasted qualifying time for any Mazda RX-8.

He later broke the 50 second barrier with a Toyota 86 named the HKS TRB-003 however the lap is heavily disputed to be counted as record for tuning car due the car using a full racing slicks tires instead of the usual semi-slicks or radial tires.

==== Endurance racing ====
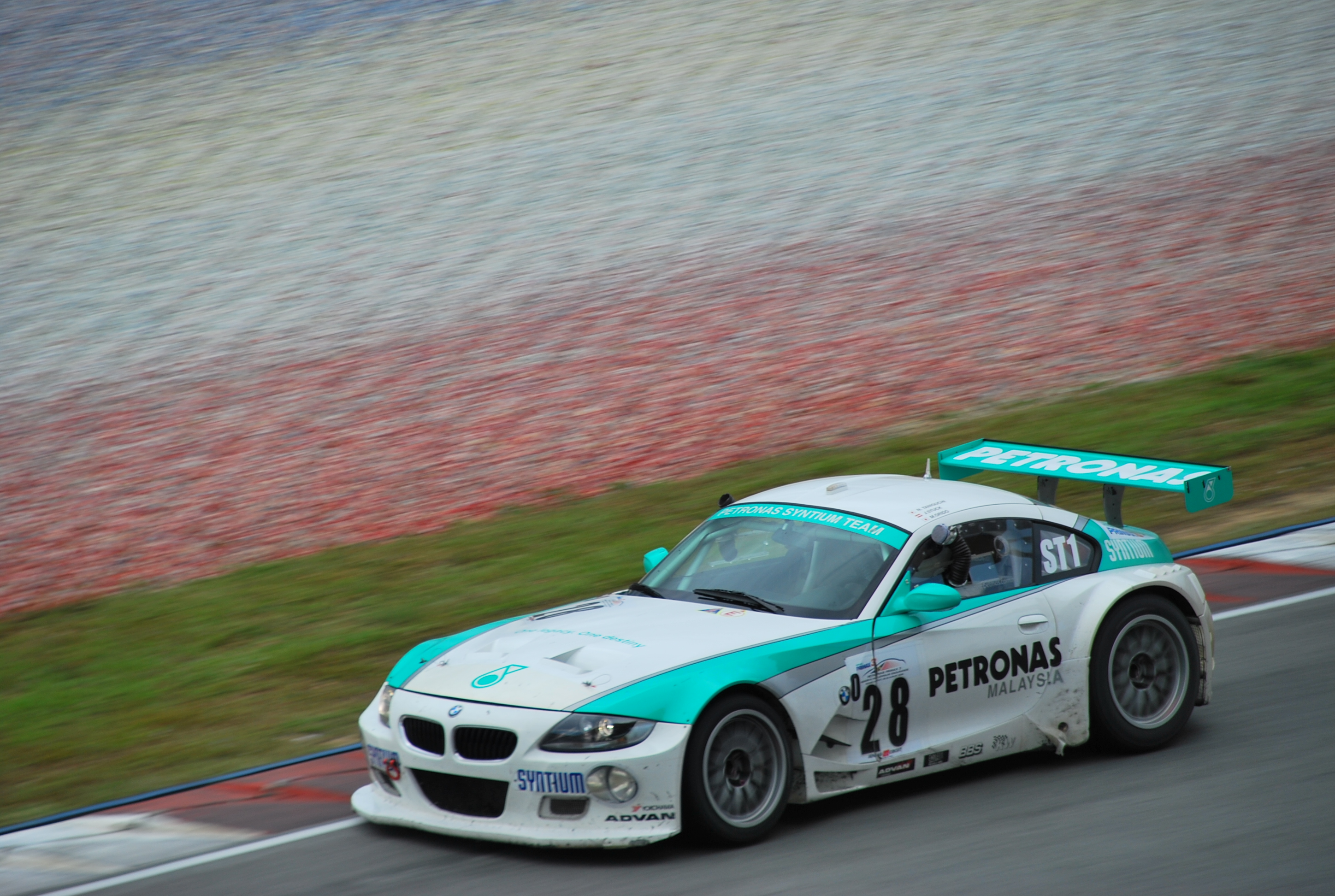
Taniguchi's #28 Petronas Syntium BMW Z4 M Coupé at the Sepang 12 Hours

Taniguchi has regularly been involved in different endurance racing competitions. He won the Tokachi 24 Hours in 2005 driving the Porsche 911 GT3 Cup.

Taniguchi also won the Sepang 12 Hours twice in 2011 and 2012 driving the BMW Z4 M Coupé, and the Fuji 500 km in 2012 and 2014 driving the BMW Z4 GT3.

Taniguchi won the A5 petrol class and second overall in 2010 Dubai 24 Hour with his teammates Fariqe Hairuman, Masataka Yanagida, and Johannes Stuck in the Petronas Syntium Team BMW Z4 M Coupé.

==== World Touring Car Championship ====
Taniguchi made his World Touring Car Championship debut with Proteam Motorsport at the 2009 FIA WTCC Race of Japan, at the Okayama International Circuit.

One Make Series

Taniguchi had competed in several One Make Racing series including Netz Cup Altezza and winning championship in both Civic Race and Gazoo Racing 86/BRZ Race.

== Outside racing ==
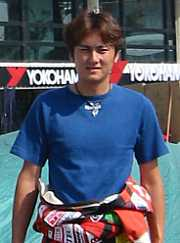
Taniguchi in Macau in 2002.

Taniguchi appears in many DVD series, such as Video Option, Drift Tengoku, Best Motoring, Rev Speed Video and Hot Version. He often presents alongside fellow racing drivers Manabu Orido and Keiichi Tsuchiya.

=== Personal Life ===
Taniguchi was born in Hiroshima, Taniguchi lived with his father as his parents split early in his childhood and he lived most of his childhood life without knowing his mother. It was not until his teenage year where he reunite with his mother and always in contact ever since. Taniguchi was married on 12 July 2011 and maintains his family's privacy. He lived in apartment complex in Yokohama with his wife and two dogs. His apartment is located behind Takahiro Ueno apartment but they're no longer neighbour as Ueno moved to Gotemba.

Taniguchi kept a large collection of cars. Around 2016 he build a two car garage he purposely make to kept his newly restored S15 Silvia. He regularly appointed a shop called N-Stage to took car of his cars particularly the modified ones. Taniguchi is an avid golfer, often playing it at golf course as well as training his swing at driving range. He often compete in friendly events with fellow racing driver.

=== Youtube ===
Nobuteru Taniguchi

YouTube information
- Channel: NOBチャンネル
- Years active: 2020-present
- Genre: Automotive
- Subscribers: 382 thousand

On 24 March 2020, Taniguchi created his own YouTube channel called NOBチャンネル (NOB Channel) and uploaded his first video on 3 April and has since regularly uploading every Friday, his content including a car review, his project cars and many motorsport related videos.

== Complete Drifting Results ==
Colour	Result
Gold	Winner
Silver	2nd place
Bronze	3rd place
Green	Last 4 [Semi-final]
Blue	Last 8 [Quarter-final]
Purple	Last 16 (16) [1st Tsuiou Round OR Tandem Battle] (Numbers are given to indicate Top 10 finish)
Black	Disqualified (DSQ) (Given to indicate that the driver has been stripped of their position through disqualification)
White	First Round (TAN) [Tansou OR Qualifying Single Runs]
Red	Did not qualify (DNQ)

- When driver's position are highlighted in blue, this indicates either the driver earned 100pt or 100pt tansou (solo run) bonus has been awarded, with the latter being in use for Pre-2005.

=== D1 Grand Prix ===
Year	Entrant	Car	1	2	3	4	5	6	7	Position	Points
2001	HKS	Nissan Silvia S15	EBS; 4	NIK; 1	BHH; TAN	EBS; 4	NIK; 1			1st	68
2002	HKS	Nissan Silvia S15	BHH; TAN	EBS; 1	SGO; 10	TKB; 16	EBS; 3	SEK; 3	NIK; 6	2nd	64
2003	HKS	Nissan Silvia S15	TKB; TAN	BHH; 16	SGO; DNQ	FUJ; 2	EBS; 6	SEK; 3	TKB; 1	4th	64
2004	HKS	Nissan Silvia S15	IRW; 2	SGO; 2	EBS; 3	APS; 1	ODB; 6			2nd	82
2004	HKS	Toyota Altezza SXE-10						EBS; TAN	TKB; 16	2nd	82
2005	HKS	Nissan Silvia S15	IRW; 10							10th	36
2005	HKS	Toyota Altezza SXE-10		ODB; 2	SGO; TAN	APS	EBS; 8	FUJ; 6	TKB	10th	36
2008	HKS	Toyota Altezza SXE-10	EBS	FUJ; 9	SUZ	OKY	APS	EBS	FUJ	23rd	8
2012	HKS	Toyota Altezza SXE-10	ODB; 10								
2012	HKS	Toyota 86		SUZ; 5	APS; 3	EBS	EBS	CNT	ODB		

== Racing record ==
=== Complete JGTC/Super GT results ===
(key) (Races in bold indicate pole position) (Races in italics indicate fastest lap)

Year	Team	Car	Class	1	2	3	4	5	6	7	8	9	DC	Pts
2002	RE Amemiya	Mazda RX-7	GT300	TAI; 6	FUJ; 12	SUG; Ret	SEP; 1	FUJ; 12	MOT; Ret	MIN; Ret	SUZ		13th	29
2003	RE Amemiya	Mazda RX-7	GT300	TAI; 21	FUJ; 10	SUG; 3	FUJ; 23	FUJ; Ret	MOT; 14	AUT; 20	SUZ		9th	4
2004	Racing Project Bandoh	Toyota Celica	GT300	TAI; 4	SUG; 1	SEP; Ret	TOK; 7	MOT; 13	AUT; 5	SUZ; 5			5th	48
2005	Racing Project Bandoh	Toyota Celica	GT300	**OKA**; 7	FUJ; 6	SEP; 7	SUG; 7	MOT; 2	FUJ; 6	AUT; 3	SUZ; 9		7th	54
2006	Direxiv	Vemac RD320R	GT300	SUZ; 7	OKA; 1	FUJ; 18	SEP; 2	SUG; 4	SUZ; 2				**3rd**	**75**
2006	R&D Sport	Vemac RD320R	GT300							MOT; 6	AUT; 20	FUJ; 13	**3rd**	**75**
2007	Team Taisan	Porsche 996 GT3-RS	GT300	SUZ; 11	OKA; 3	FUJ; 19	SEP; 13	SUG; Ret	SUZ; Ret	MOT; 1	AUT; 8	FUJ; 1	6th	58
2008	Team Taisan	Porsche 996 GT3-RS	GT300	SUZ; 3	OKA; 2	FUJ; Ret	SEP; 15	SUG; 7	SUZ; 5	**MOT**; 4	AUT; 15	FUJ; 1	**3rd**	**71**
2009	RE Amemiya	Mazda RX-7	GT300	OKA; 3	SUZ; 2	FUJ; 3	SEP; 3	SUG; 11	SUZ; 7	FUJ; DNS	AUT; 2	MOT; 2	**2nd**	**82**
2010	RE Amemiya	Mazda RX-7	GT300	**SUZ**; 1	OKA; 18	FUJ; 11	SEP; 1	SUG; 7	SUZ; 6	FUJ; C	MOT; 8		**3rd**	**52**
2011	GSR & Studie with Team Ukyo	BMW Z4 GT3	GT300	OKA; 4	FUJ; 5	**SEP**; 1	SUG; 6	SUZ; 5	**FUJ**; 1	AUT; 9	**MOT**; 1		**1st**	**87**
2012	GSR & Studie with Team Ukyo	BMW Z4 GT3	GT300	OKA; 3	FUJ; 1	SEP; 12	SUG; 7	SUZ; Ret	FUJ; 8	AUT; 5	MOT; 4		5th	52
2013	GSR & Studie with Team Ukyo	BMW Z4 GT3	GT300	OKA; 2	FUJ; 9	SEP; 6	SUG; 15	SUZ; DSQ	FUJ; 1	FUJ	AUT; 1	MOT; 4	**3rd**	**70**
2014	GSR & Team Ukyo	BMW Z4 GT3	GT300	OKA; 1	FUJ; 1	AUT; 16	SUG; 15	FUJ; 4	SUZ; 5	BUR; 3	MOT; 3		**1st**	**78**
2015	GSR & Team Ukyo	Mercedes-Benz SLS AMG GT3	GT300	OKA; 5	FUJ; 5	CHA; 13	FUJ; 18	SUZ; 8	SUG; 16	AUT; 7	MOT; 2		11th	35
2016	GSR & Team Ukyo	Mercedes-AMG GT3	GT300	OKA; 2	FUJ; 18	AUT; 7	SUG; 5	FUJ; 5	SUZ; 8	CHA; 18	MOT; 3		7th	47
2017	GSR & Team Ukyo	Mercedes-AMG GT3	GT300	OKA; 1	FUJ; 10	AUT; 5	SUG; 4	FUJ; 2	SUZ; 19	CHA; 2	MOT; 3		1st	77
2018	GSR & Team Ukyo	Mercedes-AMG GT3	GT300	OKA; 8	FUJ; 5	SUZ; 8	CHA; 7	SUG; 2	FUJ; 3	AUT; 19	MOT; 3		4th	56
2019	GSR & Team Ukyo	Mercedes-AMG GT3	GT300	OKA; 8‡	FUJ; 6	SUZ; 4	CHA; 12	FUJ; 8	AUT; 4	SUG; 2	MOT; 5		4th	47.5
2020	GSR & Team Ukyo	Mercedes-AMG GT3 Evo	GT300	FUJ (1); 9	FUJ (2); 27	SUZ (1); 8	MOT (1); 9	FUJ (3); 8	SUZ (2); 3	MOT (2); 2	FUJ (4); 15		8th	36
2021	GSR & Team Ukyo	Mercedes-AMG GT3 Evo	GT300	OKA; 14	FUJ (1); 8	SUZ; 5	MOT (1); 3	SUG; 23	AUT; 6	MOT; Ret	FUJ (2); 4		10th	33
2022	GSR & Team Ukyo	Mercedes-AMG GT3 Evo	GT300	OKA; 7	FSW; 16	SUZ; 11	FSW; 13	SUZ; 1	SUG; Ret	AUT; 6	TRM; 7		9th	33
2023	GSR & Team Ukyo	Mercedes-AMG GT3 Evo	GT300	OKA; 9	FSW; Ret	SUZ; 18	FSW; **12**	SUZ; 5	SUG; 5	AUT; 6	TRM; 11		14th	20
2024	GSR & Team Ukyo	Mercedes-AMG GT3 Evo	GT300	OKA; 9	FSW; 4	SUZ; 12	FSW; 2	SUG; 20	AUT; 16	TRM; 10	SUZ; 10		8th	30
2025	GSR & Team Ukyo	Mercedes-AMG GT3 Evo	GT300	**OKA**; 4	FSW; 9	SEP	FS1 (2)	FS2; 5	SUZ; 5	SUG; 4	AUT; 10	TRM; 8	5th	74.5
2026	GSR & Team Ukyo	Mercedes-AMG GT3 Evo	GT300	OKA; 4	FSW; 8	FSW; 13	SUZ; 22	SUG; 10	AUT; 17	TRM; 8	TRM; Ret		19th	38

^{‡} Half points awarded as less than 75% of race distance was completed. ^{*} Season still in progress.

Preceded by None	D1 Grand Prix Champion; 2001	Succeeded by Katsuhiro Ueo
