= Taku Bamba =

Japanese racing driver

Taku Bamba 番場琢
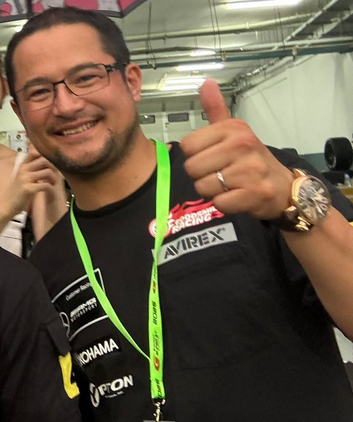
- Taku Bamba at Super GT Sepang 2025
- Nationality: Japan
- Born: 30 January 1982 (age 44) Tokyo, Japan

Super GT career
- Debut season: 2005
- Current team: Saitama Toyopet Green Brave
- Categorisation: FIA Silver
- Car number: 52
- Championships: 2011
- Wins: 4

Taku Bamba (番場琢 - Bamba Taku; born January 30, 1982) is a Japanese professional racing driver, who most recently competed in the Super GT series. He won the 2011 Super GT Championship in the GT300 class with Good Smile Racing with Team UKYO.

== Complete Super GT results ==
(key) (Races in bold indicate pole position) (Races in italics indicate fastest lap)

Year	Team	Car	Class	1	2	3	4	5	6	7	8	9	DC	Pts
2005	JIM GAINER	Ferrari 360 Modena	GT300	OKA	FSW; 17	SEP	SUG	TRM	FSW; Ret	AUT	SUZ		22nd	1
2006	MOLA	Nissan Z	GT300	**SUZ**; 12	**OKA**; 5	FSW; 6	SEP; 12	SUG; 1	SUZ; 8	TRM; 24	AUT; 16	FSW; 7	7th	56
2007	DHG Racing	Ford GT	GT300	SUZ; Ret	OKA; 15	FSW; 13	SEP	SUG; 11	SUZ; 9	TRM; 14	AUT; DNS	FSW; 17	27th	2
2009	Studie GLAD Racing	BMW Z4	GT300	OKA	SUZ	FSW	SEP	SUG	SUZ; Ret	FSW	AUT; 10	TRM; Ret	27th	1
2010	Good Smile Racing with COX	Porsche 911	GT300	SUZ; 12	OKA; 10	FSW; 14	SEP	SUG; 12	SUZ; 10	FSW; C	TRM; 9		19th	4
2011	GSR&Studie with TeamUKYO	BMW Z4 GT3	GT300	OKA; 4	FSW; 5	**SEP**; 1	SUG; 6	SUZ; 5	**FSW**; 1	AUT; 9	**TRM**; 1		**1st**	**87**
2012	GSR&Studie with TeamUKYO	BMW Z4 GT3	GT300	OKA; 15	FSW; 11	SEP; 10	SUG; 11	SUZ; 7	FSW; 11	AUT; 12	TRM; 17		22nd	6
2017	Saitama Toyopet Green Brave	Toyota Mark X MC	GT300	OKA; Ret	FSW; 27	AUT; 20	SUG; 14	FSW; 23	SUZ; 12	CHA; 22	TRM; 20		NC	0
2018	Saitama Toyopet Green Brave	Toyota Mark X MC	GT300	OKA; 11	FSW; 19	SUZ; 14	CHA; 17	FSW; Ret	SUG; 7	AUT; 17	TRM; 13		19th	4
2021	Saitama Toyopet Green Brave	Toyota Supra	GT300	OKA	FSW	SUZ; 18	TRM	SUG	AUT	TRM	FSW		NC	0
